= List of AFL debuts in 1997 =

The 1997 AFL season was the one hundred and first season of the Australian Football League/Victorian Football League. Ninety eight players made their senior debut in the 1997 season, while another 56 players debuted for a new club having previously played in the AFL.

== Debuts ==
Name	Club	Age at debut	Round debuted	Games	Goals	Notes
Simon Goodwin	Adelaide	20 years, 94 days	1	275	162	All-Australian 2000, 2001, 2005, 2006 and 2009. Adelaide captain 2008–2010.
Brett James	Adelaide	24 years, 105 days	1	76	26	Previously played for Collingwood. Brother of Roger James.
Trent Ormond-Allen	Adelaide	20 years, 298 days	2	42	2	Previously played for Melbourne.
Clay Sampson	Adelaide	21 years, 153 days	17	24	16	Previously played for Melbourne.
Chad Rintoul	Adelaide	22 years, 242 days	1	23	16	
Barry Standfield	Adelaide	27 years, 46 days	2	13	23	Previously played for Footscray.
Tim Cook	Adelaide	23 years, 45 days	2	8	5	
Brent Williams	Adelaide	19 years, 46 days	1	7	4	
Aaron Keating	Adelaide	22 years, 310 days	1	6	1	Brother of Clark Keating.
Tom Gilligan	Adelaide	18 years, 161 days	3	3	1	
Chris Johnson	Brisbane Lions	20 years, 304 days	1	205	105	Brisbane Lions captain 2007. All-Australian 2002 and 2004. Previously played for Fitzroy.
Jarrod Molloy	Brisbane Lions	20 years, 322 days	1	61	104	Son of Shane Molloy. Previously played for Fitzroy.
Brett Voss	Brisbane Lions	19 years, 65 days	8	35	11	Brother of Michael Voss.
Scott Bamford	Brisbane Lions	22 years, 287 days	2	24	17	Previously played for Fitzroy
Brad Boyd	Brisbane Lions	25 years, 288 days	9	15	8	Previously played for Fitzroy.
Nick Trask	Brisbane Lions	19 years, 116 days	10	12	3	
John Barker	Brisbane Lions	22 years, 74 days	6	8	1	Previously played for Fitzroy.
Nick Carter	Brisbane Lions	19 years, 14 days	7	5	1	Previously played for Fitzroy.
Shane Clayton	Brisbane Lions	18 years, 199 days	18	5	0	Previously played for Fitzroy.
Lance Whitnall	Carlton	17 years, 220 days	1	216	348	Carlton captain 2007, All-Australian 2000, Carlton Best and Fairest 2006 and AFL Rising Star nominee 1997 (Round 1).
Darren Hulme	Carlton	19 years, 324 days	10	110	56	AFL Rising Star nominee 1998 (Round 10).
Anthony Franchina	Carlton	19 years, 309 days	20	105	26	
Mark Porter	Carlton	20 years, 281 days	16	55	13	
Adam White	Carlton	21 years, 89 days	2	44	21	
Ben Nelson	Carlton	20 years, 81 days	3	40	6	
Jacob Anstey	Carlton	19 years, 104 days	7	16	5	
Mick McGuane	Carlton	29 years, 92 days	1	3	1	Previously played for Collingwood.
Andrew Balkwill	Carlton	25 years, 20 days	3	1	0	
Sam Smart	Carlton	22 years, 114 days	21	1	0	
Anthony Rocca	Collingwood	19 years, 226 days	1	220	404	Collingwood Leading Goalkicker 2000, 2002, 2006 and 2007. Brother of Saverio Rocca. Previously played for Sydney.
Mal Michael	Collingwood	19 years, 319 days	7	61	23	AFL Rising Star nominee 1997 (Round 18).
Luke Godden	Collingwood	18 years, 316 days	18	36	0	
Richard Osborne	Collingwood	32 years, 286 days	1	29	26	Previously played for Fitzroy, Sydney and Footscray.
Josh Mahoney	Collingwood	19 years, 226 days	12	19	8	
Brad Fuller	Collingwood	18 years, 324 days	13	19	12	
John Barnett	Collingwood	21 years, 226 days	1	8	4	Previously played for North Melbourne.
Jason Taylor	Collingwood	28 years, 193 days	2	4	0	Previously played for Fitzroy and Hawthorn.
Brad Cassidy	Collingwood	21 years, 31 days	21	2	0	Previously played for Fitzroy.
Jason Johnson	Essendon	19 years, 189 days	18	184	109	Best and Fairest 2001 and 2005. All-Australian 2001. AFL Rising Star nominee 1998.
Blake Caracella	Essendon	20 years, 30 days	3	126	151	AFL Rising Star nominee 1997 (Round 13).
Chris Heffernan	Essendon	18 years, 194 days	19	123	46	
Andrew Ukovic	Essendon	18 years, 204 days	12	19	8	
Andrew Bomford	Essendon	22 years, 268 days	3	13	5	
Daniel McAlister	Essendon	19 years, 1 days	21	6	0	
Matthew Banks	Essendon	20 years, 279 days	5	3	1	
Matthew Watson	Essendon	20 years, 264 days	21	1	0	
Heath Black	Fremantle	17 years, 326 days	4	138	61	AFL Rising Star nominee 1998 (Round 4).
Jess Sinclair	Fremantle	18 years, 280 days	10	50	26	AFL Rising Star nominee 1997 (Round 5).
Trent Carroll	Fremantle	19 years, 27 days	9	33	1	Brother of Nathan Carroll.
Matthew Clucas	Fremantle	19 years, 47 days	6	11	1	
Martin Whitelaw	Fremantle	21 years, 94 days	21	1	0	
Darren Milburn	Geelong	19 years, 349 days	1	292	94	All-Australian 2007. AFL Rising Star nominee 1998 (Round 22).
Adam Houlihan	Geelong	19 years, 14 days	4	61	75	AFL Rising Star nominee 1997 (Round 6). Brother of Damian and Ryan Houlihan.
Paul Corrigan	Geelong	19 years, 243 days	1	53	6	
Daniel Lowther	Geelong	20 years, 92 days	16	34	9	
Tim Hargreaves	Geelong	21 years, 310 days	2	20	12	Previously played for Hawthorn.
Cameron Roberts	Geelong	18 years, 266 days	10	11	2	
Ben Dixon	Hawthorn	19 years, 316 days	5	203	282	Son of Joe Dixon.
Jonathan Hay	Hawthorn	17 years, 347 days	17	149	12	All-Australian 2001. AFL Rising Star nominee 1998 (Round 5).
Aaron Lord	Hawthorn	21 years, 251 days	1	93	136	Hawthorn leading goalkicker 1999. Previously played for Geelong.
Jon Hassall	Hawthorn	23 years, 227 days	1	44	5	Previously played for Collingwood.
Justin Crawford	Hawthorn	20 years, 9 days	1	29	21	Brother of Shane Crawford. Previously played for Sydney.
Brad Scott	Hawthorn	20 years, 330 days	1	22	6	AFL Rising Star nominee 1997 (Round 17). Brother of Chris Scott.
Todd Ridley	Hawthorn	28 years, 82 days	6	2	0	Previously played for Essendon and Fremantle.
Dwayne Griffin	Hawthorn	20 years, 185 days	22	1	0	
James McDonald	Melbourne	20 years, 295 days	17	251	56	Melbourne captain 2008–2010. All-Australian 2006. Melbourne Best and Fairest 2006 and 2007. Brother of Anthony and Alex McDonald.
Russell Robertson	Melbourne	18 years, 264 days	20	228	428	Melbourne Best and Fairest 2003. Melbourne leading goalkicker 2001, 2005, 2007 and 2009. AFL Rising Star nominee 1998 (Round 14)
Shane Woewodin	Melbourne	20 years, 258 days	1	138	63	Brownlow Medallist 2000. Melbourne Best and Fairest 2000. AFL Rising Star nominee 1997 (Round 10)
Alistair Nicholson	Melbourne	19 years, 62 days	6	110	3	
Anthony McDonald	Melbourne	24 years, 309 days	4	104	41	Brother of Alex and James McDonald
Brent Grgic	Melbourne	17 years, 271 days	14	77	29	
Robert Pyman	Melbourne	25 years, 172 days	1	19	8	Previously played for North Melbourne and Collingwood.
Leigh Newton	Melbourne	21 years, 17 days	3	13	6	
Nick Pesch	Melbourne	22 years, 290 days	3	4	0	Previously played for Adelaide.
Byron Pickett	North Melbourne	19 years, 334 days	15	120	81	All-Australian 1999. AFL Rising Star 1998.
Martin Pike	North Melbourne	24 years, 133 days	15	81	19	Previously played for Melbourne and Fitzroy.
Brett Chandler	North Melbourne	21 years, 259 days	1	44	6	Previously played for Fitzroy.
Evan Hewitt	North Melbourne	18 years, 357 days	13	33	22	
Anthony Mellington	North Melbourne	22 years, 267 days	4	20	19	Previously played for Fitzroy.
Chris Groom	North Melbourne	23 years, 354 days	20	5	1	Previously played for Adelaide and Fremantle.
Julian Kirzner	North Melbourne	17 years, 314 days	24	3	5	
Paul Wynd	North Melbourne	21 years, 38 days	11	3	0	
Warren Tredrea	Port Adelaide	18 years, 103 days	2	255	549	Port Adelaide captain 2006-2008, All-Australian 2001, 2002, 2003 and 2004, Port Adelaide Best and Fairest 2001, 2004, 2005 and 2009. Port Adelaide leading goal kicker 1998, 1999, 2001, 2003, 2004, 2005 and 2009. AFL Rising Star nominee 1998 (Round 7).
Peter Burgoyne	Port Adelaide	19 years, 60 days	1	240	193	Brother of Shaun Burgoyne.
Brendon Lade	Port Adelaide	20 years, 262 days	1	234	182	All-Australian 2006, 2007. Port Adelaide Best and Fairest 2006. AFL Rising Star nominee 1997
Michael Wilson	Port Adelaide	20 years, 128 days	1	192	51	AFL Rising Star winner 1997.
Stuart Dew	Port Adelaide	17 years, 329 days	15	180	245	Port Adelaide leading goalkicker 2002. AFL Rising Star nominee 1998 (Round 13).
Gavin Wanganeen	Port Adelaide	23 years, 292 days	2	173	138	Port Adelaide captain 1997-2000. All-Australian 2001 and 2003. Port Adelaide Best and Fairest 2003. Previously played for Essendon.
Adam Kingsley	Port Adelaide	21 years, 221 days	1	170	47	Port Adelaide Best and Fairest 1998.
Josh Francou	Port Adelaide	22 years, 234 days	1	156	72	All-Australian 2002
Roger James	Port Adelaide	21 years, 188 days	5	147	87	Brother of Brett James.
Stephen Paxman	Port Adelaide	26 years, 115 days	1	138	20	Port Adelaide Best and Fairest 1999. Previously played for Fitzroy.
Matthew Primus	Port Adelaide	22 years, 77 days	1	137	76	Port Adelaide captain 2001 – 2005, Port Adelaide Best and Fairest 2002 and All-Australian 2001 and 2002. Grandson of Reg Hickey. Previously played for Fitzroy.
Darren Mead	Port Adelaide	26 years, 0 days	1	122	8	Port Adelaide Best and Fairest 1997.
Brayden Lyle	Port Adelaide	24 years, 23 days	1	90	12	Previously played for West Coast.
Fabian Francis	Port Adelaide	23 years, 156 days	1	86	44	Previously played for Melbourne and Brisbane Bears.
Stephen Daniels	Port Adelaide	20 years, 229 days	4	58	2	
Shane Bond	Port Adelaide	21 years, 263 days	1	57	11	Brother of Troy Bond. Previously played for West Coast.
Nathan Eagleton	Port Adelaide	18 years, 168 days	5	56	45	
Donald Dickie	Port Adelaide	24 years, 325 days	1	55	19	
Shayne Breuer	Port Adelaide	24 years, 200 days	1	54	29	Previously played for Geelong.
Bowen Lockwood	Port Adelaide	18 years, 279 days	2	50	45	AFL Rising Star nominee 1997 (Round 3).
Scott Cummings	Port Adelaide	23 years, 71 days	1	37	102	Port Adelaide leading goalkicker 1997. Previously played for Essendon.
Adam Heuskes	Port Adelaide	21 years, 9 days	1	37	1	Previously played for Sydney.
Darryl Poole	Port Adelaide	24 years, 362 days	1	24	11	
David Brown	Port Adelaide	27 years, 181 days	1	22	18	Previously played for Adelaide.
Nathan Steinberner	Port Adelaide	20 years, 167 days	21	20	3	
Nigel Fiegert	Port Adelaide	21 years, 69 days	2	19	6	
Brent Heaver	Port Adelaide	25 years, 287 days	1	16	13	Previously played for Melbourne and Carlton.
Stephen Carter	Port Adelaide	23 years, 53 days	1	10	0	
John Rombotis	Port Adelaide	20 years, 216 days	8	9	5	Previously played for Fitzroy.
Ian Downsborough	Port Adelaide	25 years, 70 days	1	7	2	Previously played for West Coast.
Damian Squire	Port Adelaide	23 years, 134 days	1	5	4	
Tom Carr	Port Adelaide	18 years, 308 days	4	5	0	
Jarrod Cotton	Port Adelaide	21 years, 57 days	1	4	4	
Mark Conway	Port Adelaide	24 years, 48 days	14	1	0	
Paul Geister	Port Adelaide	25 years, 215 days	22	1	0	Previously played for North Melbourne.
Mark Chaffey	Richmond	19 years, 348 days	4	166	34	
Brett Evans	Richmond	24 years, 364 days	9	28	26	
Matthew Manfield	Richmond	19 years, 350 days	1	6	2	Previously played for Fitzroy.
Ewan Thompson	Richmond	20 years, 100 days	14	4	1	
Jason Baldwin	Richmond	27 years, 211 days	11	2	0	Previously played for Fitzroy.
Daniel Donati	Richmond	19 years, 280 days	14	1	0	
Nick Jewell	Richmond	19 years, 347 days	19	1	0	Also represented Victoria in cricket. Son of Tony Jewell.
Max Hudghton	St Kilda	20 years, 208 days	1	234	14	
Andrew Thompson	St Kilda	24 years, 159 days	1	221	93	St Kilda Best and Fairest 2000.
Jason Heatley	St Kilda	25 years, 51 days	3	60	163	St Kilda leading goalkicker 1997 and 1998. Previously played for West Coast.
Brad Campbell	St Kilda	21 years, 134 days	6	22	2	
Brett Cook	St Kilda	23 years, 344 days	1	18	5	Previously played for Fitzroy.
Troy Gray	St Kilda	24 years, 32 days	1	9	2	Previously played for Sydney.
Ben Mathews	Sydney	18 years, 232 days	16	198	45	AFL Rising Star nominee 1999 (Round 20).
Rowan Warfe	Sydney	20 years, 315 days	6	84	4	Previously played for Fitzroy.
John Stevens	Sydney	25 years, 300 days	3	78	45	
Troy Cook	Sydney	20 years, 242 days	3	43	11	AFL Rising Star Award nominee 1997 (Round 11)
Mark Orchard	Sydney	20 years, 361 days	1	41	5	Previously played for Collingwood.
Paul Licuria	Sydney	19 years, 85 days	1	10	2	
Mark Kinnear	Sydney	17 years, 256 days	6	6	1	
Ben Wilson	Sydney	20 years, 33 days	1	4	0	Previously played for Collingwood.
Shannon Corcoran	Sydney	26 years, 36 days	1	2	0	Previously played for Footscray and the Brisbane Bears.
Michael Braun	West Coast	19 years, 77 days	11	228	66	AFL Rising Star Award nominee 1997 (Round 14) and 1998 (Round 1).
Michael Gardiner	West Coast	17 years, 288 days	4	129	87	All-Australian team 2003. AFL Rising Star nominee 1997 (Round 19).
Josh Wooden	West Coast	18 years, 135 days	1	96	18	
Nicholas Stone	West Coast	24 years, 212 days	4	33	4	
Ilija Grgic	West Coast	25 years, 24 days	1	23	15	Previously played for Footscray.
Neil Marshall	West Coast	20 years, 13 days	16	4	0	
Trent Cummings	West Coast	23 years, 48 days	9	2	1	Previously played for Fitzroy. Great-grandson of Joe Johnson, son of Percy Cummings and brother of Robert Cummings.
Nathan Brown	Western Bulldogs	19 years, 48 days	1	137	206	All-Australian team 2001 and 2002. Western Bulldogs leading goalkicker 2002 and 2003.
Paul Hudson	Western Bulldogs	26 years, 252 days	1	108	214	All-Australian team 1998. Western Bulldogs leading goalkicker 1998 and 1999. Previously played for Hawthorn. Son of Peter Hudson.
Brett Montgomery	Western Bulldogs	23 years, 308 days	2	78	68	
Matthew Dent	Western Bulldogs	25 years, 72 days	1	63	10	Previously played for Fitzroy.
Adam Contessa	Western Bulldogs	20 years, 181 days	13	45	8	
Stephen Powell	Western Bulldogs	20 years, 237 days	6	30	21	
Simon Minton-Connell	Western Bulldogs	27 years, 337 days	1	25	53	Western Bulldogs leading goalkicker 1997. Previously played for Carlton, Sydney and Hawthorn.
David Round	Western Bulldogs	18 years, 291 days	3	2	0	Son of Barry Round.
