= Port Adelaide Football Club drafting and trading history =

The Port Adelaide Football Club have drafted players through the Australian Football League's draft system, beginning with the 1996 AFL draft. They have participated in every National Draft since then, and also participated in some Pre-season Drafts and each Rookie Draft (first held in 1997).

== 1996 AFL draft ==
- #6 John Rombotis
- #7 Bowen Lockwood
- #9 Mark Harwood
- #37 Adam Kingsley

=== Trades ===
Player	Original club	Traded for
Shane Bond	West Coast	Draft Pick #57
Brayden Lyle	West Coast	Draft Pick #57
Scott Cummings	Essendon	Draft Picks #2 & #28
Shayne Breuer	Geelong	Hamish Simpson, Cameron Roberts & Draft Picks #8 & #43
David Brown	Adelaide	Nick Laidlaw
Paul Geister	North Melbourne	Kent Kingsley & Wade Kingsley
Brent Heaver	Carlton	Ben Nelson & Andrew Balkwill
Scott Hodges	Adelaide	Aaron Keating & Tim Cook

=== Uncontracted player selections ===
- Matthew Primus - Fitzroy
- Gavin Wanganeen - Essendon
- Adam Heuskes - Sydney
- Ian Downsborough - West Coast Eagles

=== Zone Selections ===
- Nathan Eagleton
- Tom Harley
- Peter Burgoyne
- Stuart Dew
- Fabian Francis
- Josh Francou
- Roger James
- Brendon Lade
- Darren Mead
- Nathan Steinberner
- Warren Tredrea
- Michael Wilson
- Stephen Daniels
- Donald Dickie
- Paul Evans
- Scott Bassett
- Rhett Biglands
- Tom Carr
- Stephen Carter
- Mark Conway
- Jarrod Cotton
- Nigel Fiegert
- Scott Freeborn
- Jake Lynch
- Scott Mathews
- Andrew Osborn
- Darryl Poole
- Damian Squire
- Jonathon Yerbury

== 1997 AFL draft ==
=== Pre-Season Draft ===
Player	Original club
Stephen Paxman	Fitzroy Football Club

=== Draft picks ===
1. 9 Chad Cornes
2. 25 Nick Stevens
3. 41 Danny Morton
4. 57 Darren Fraser
5. 72 Not Utilised

=== Trades ===
Player	Original club	Traded for
Brett Chalmers	Adelaide	Ian Downsborough
Chris Naish	Richmond	John Rombotis

== 1998 AFL draft ==
=== Pre-Season Draft ===
Player	Original club
Matthew Bode	Glenelg Football Club

=== Draft picks ===
1. 5 Michael Stevens
2. 7 Josh Carr
3. 37 Adam Morgan
4. 39 Toby Thurstans
5. 54 Derek Murray

=== Trades ===
Player	Original club	Traded for
Che Cockatoo-Collins	Essendon	Draft Pick #23
Jarrad Schofield	West Coast	Scott Cummings

=== Rookie Elevation ===
Barnaby French
