= 1996 AFL draft =

Draft for the Australian Football League

The 1996 AFL draft was held at the conclusion of the 1996 Australian Football League (AFL) season. The inaugural rookie draft was held with the 1997 pre-season draft.

The AFL draft is the annual draft of new unsigned players by Australian rules football teams that participate in the main competition of that sport, the Australian Football League.

Clubs receive picks based on the position in which they finish on the ladder during the season, although these picks can be swapped around by teams for trading players.

== Trades: club by club ==
=== Adelaide ===
- Brett James from Collingwood for Jonathon Ross
- Trent Ormond-Allen from Melbourne for draft pick #83
- Clay Sampson from Melbourne for Nick Pesch
- Tim Cook and Aaron Keating from Port Adelaide for Scott Hodges
- Nick Laidlaw from Port Adelaide for David Brown
- Barry Standfield from Western Bulldogs for draft picks #32 and #47

=== Carlton ===
- Ben Nelson and Andrew Balkwill from Port Adelaide for Brent Heaver
- Mick McGuane from Collingwood for draft picks #19 and #65

=== Collingwood ===
- Anthony Rocca from Sydney for Ben Wilson, Mark Orchard and draft picks #14 and #33
- John R. Barnett from North Melbourne for draft pick #70
- Richard Osborne from Western Bulldogs for draft pick #61
- Jonathon Ross from Adelaide for Brett James

=== Geelong ===
- Hamish Simpson and Cameron Roberts from Port Adelaide for draft pick #37
- Tim Hargreaves from Hawthorn for Aaron Lord

=== Hawthorn ===
- Aaron Lord from Geelong for Tim Hargreaves
- Justin Crawford from Sydney for David McEwan and draft pick #17

=== North Melbourne ===
- Kent Kingsley and Wade Kingsley from Port Adelaide for Paul Geister

=== Melbourne ===
- Nick Pesch from Adelaide for Clay Sampson

=== Port Adelaide ===
- Shane Bond and Brayden Lyle from West Coast for draft pick #57
- Shayne Breuer from Geelong for Hamish Simpson, Cameron Roberts and draft picks #8 and 43
- David Brown from Adelaide for Nick Laidlaw
- Paul Geister from North Melbourne for Kent Kingsley and Wade Kingsley
- Brent Heaver from Carlton for Ben Nelson and Andrew Balkwill
- Scott Hodges from Adelaide for Aaron Keating and Tim Cook
  - For zone and uncontracted player selections see below

=== Richmond ===
- Trent Nichols from North Melbourne for draft pick #50

=== St Kilda ===
- Troy Gray from Sydney for draft pick #34

=== Sydney ===
- Mark Orchard and Ben Wilson from Collingwood for Anthony Rocca
- David McEwan from Hawthorn for Justin Crawford

=== West Coast ===
- Ilija Grgic from Western Bulldogs for Luke Trew and draft pick #20

=== Western Bulldogs ===
- Simon Minton-Connell from Hawthorn for draft pick #29
- Luke Trew from West Coast for Ilija Grgic

== 1996 national draft ==
Pick	Player	Recruited from	Club
1	Michael Gardiner	Claremont (WAFL)	West Coast
2	Chris Heffernan	Geelong (U18)	Essendon
3	Rory Hilton	Murray (U18)	Brisbane Lions
4	Mark Kinnear	Calder (U18)	Sydney
5	Daniel McAlister	Tasmania (U18)	Essendon
6	John Rombotis	Fitzroy	Port Adelaide
7	Bowen Lockwood	Geelong (U18)	Port Adelaide
8	Leigh Brockman	Tasmania (U18)	Geelong
9	Mark Harwood	Tasmania (U18)	Port Adelaide
10	Nathan Brown	Bendigo (U18)	Western Bulldogs
11	Brent Grgic	Geelong (U18)	Melbourne
12	Heath Black	Oakleigh Chargers	Fremantle
13	Tom Gilligan	Southern (U18)	Adelaide
14	Brett O'Farrell	Prahran Dragons	Sydney
15	Max Hudghton	West Brisbane (AFLQ)	St Kilda
16	Pat Steinfort	Oakleigh Chargers	Richmond
17	Rowan Warfe	Fitzroy (U18)	Sydney
18	Gerrard Bennett	Tasmania (U18)	Geelong
19	Brent Tuckey	Ballarat (U18)	Collingwood
20	Matthew Dent	Fitzroy	Western Bulldogs
21	Tim Williams	East Perth (WAFL)	Essendon
22	Alistair Nicholson	Claremont	Melbourne
23	Evan Hewitt	Subiaco (WAFL)	North Melbourne
24	Josh Wooden	NSW-ACT (U18)	West Coast
25	Andrew Bomford	Sydney	Essendon
26	Tim Notting	Ballarat (U18)	Brisbane Lions
27	Troy Cook	Perth (WAFL)	Sydney
28	Jason Johnson	Calder (U18)	Essendon
29	Nathan Turvey	South Fremantle (WAFL)	Hawthorn
30	Hayden Lamaro	Murray (U18)	Melbourne
31	Jess Sinclair	Eastern (U18)	Fremantle
32	Jim Plunkett	Northern (U18)	Western Bulldogs
33	Will Sangster	Prahran Dragons	Sydney
34	Shannon Corcoran	Brisbane	Sydney
35	Mark Chaffey	Caulfield Grammar	Richmond
36	Jonathan Hay	East Fremantle (WAFL)	Hawthorn
37	Adam Kingsley	Essendon	Port Adelaide
38	Sam Smart	Norwood (SANFL)	Carlton
39	Nick Stone	Claremont (WAFL)	West Coast
40	Forfeited due to violation of salary cap regulations	-	Essendon
41	Matthew Manfield	Fitzroy	Richmond
42	Martin Pike	Fitzroy	North Melbourne
43	Paul Corrigan	Melbourne	Geelong
44	Jacob Rhodes	Geelong (U18)	Western Bulldogs
45	Clayton Gardiner	Claremont (WAFL)	Melbourne
46	Matthew Clucas	East Fremantle (WAFL)	Fremantle
47	Brett Montgomery	Footscray	Western Bulldogs
48	Marty Warry	Fitzroy	Collingwood
49	Jason Heatley	West Coast	St Kilda
50	Luke McCormick	NSW-ACT (U18)	North Melbourne
51	Robert McMahon	Fitzroy	Hawthorn
52	Damien Lock	Bendigo (U18)	Carlton
53	Michael Braun	Bendigo (U18)	West Coast
54	Mathew Watson	Essendon	Essendon
55	Steven McKee	Myrtelford (VCFL)	Richmond
56	Cameron Mooney	NSW-ACT (U18)	North Melbourne
57	Trent Cummings	Fitzroy	West Coast
58	Paul Dooley	Williamstown (VFL)	Western Bulldogs
59	Anthony McDonald	Melbourne	Melbourne
60	Andrew Eccles	Northern (U18)	Adelaide
61	Stephen Powell	Melbourne	Western Bulldogs
62	Andrew Thompson	St Kilda	St Kilda
63	Jason Baldwin	Fitzroy	Richmond
64	Darren Collins	Port Adelaide	Hawthorn
65	Brad Cassidy	Fitzroy	Collingwood
66	Paul Hills	Essendon	Essendon
67	Byron Pickett	Port Adelaide	North Melbourne
68	Russell Robertson	Tasmania (U18)	Melbourne
69	Chad Rintoul	East Fremantle	Adelaide
70	Adam Hay	East Perth	North Melbourne
71	Brett Knowles	Gippsland (U18)	St Kilda
72	Brent Frewen	Fitzroy	Richmond
73	Brett Howman	NSW-ACT (U18)	Hawthorn
74	Chris Jackson	NSW-ACT (U18)	Carlton
75	Mark Winterton	Southern (U18)	Melbourne
76	Greg Dempsey	West Adelaide	Adelaide
77	Marcus Barham	Calder (U18)	Collingwood
78	Lucas Fleming	Northern (U18)	St Kilda
79	Daniel Donati	Old Xavs (VAFA)	Richmond
80	Chris Holcombe	Southern (U18)	Hawthorn
81	Anthony Franchina	Carlton	Carlton
82	Duncan O'Toole	Devonport	Melbourne
83	Ashley Gehling	Melbourne	Melbourne
84	Josh Mahoney	Williamstown (VFL)	Collingwood
85	Brad Scott	Hawthorn	Hawthorn
86	Ben Parker	Murray (U18)	Adelaide
87	Brad Fuller	NSW-ACT (U18)	Collingwood
88	Phil Smith	West Perth	Hawthorn
89	Dwayne Griffin	Swan Districts	Collingwood
90	Leigh Singline	Sth Launceston	Collingwood

== 1997 pre-season draft ==
Pick	Player	Recruited from	Club
1	Stephen Paxman	Fitzroy	Port Adelaide
2	Paul Hudson	Hawthorn	Western Bulldogs
3	Leigh Newton	Albury	Melbourne
4	Jason Taylor	Hawthorn	Collingwood
5	Brett Cook	Fitzroy	St Kilda
6	Brett Evans	Springvale	Richmond
7	Jon Hassall	Collingwood	Hawthorn
8	Darren Hulme	Southern Stingrays	Carlton
9	Matthew Banks	Eastern Ranges	Essendon
10	John Stevens	Old Ivanhoe Grammarians	Sydney
11	Brett Chandler	Fitzroy	North Melbourne
12	Steven Pitt	Collingwood	Western Bulldogs
13	Robert Pyman	Collingwood	Melbourne
14	Robert Schaefer	Central District	Collingwood
15	Brad Campbell	Port Melbourne	St Kilda
16	Todd Ridley	Fremantle	Hawthorn
17	Anthony Mellington	Fitzroy	North Melbourne
18	Shane Woewodin	East Fremantle	Melbourne
19	Michael R. Gardiner	Subiaco	Collingwood
20	Nigel Credin	Fitzroy	Hawthorn

== 1997 rookie draft ==
The first AFL rookie draft was held on 25 February 1997. Only players aged between 18 and 23 were eligible to be drafted. Whilst each club could draft up to six players onto their Rookie Lists, only Collingwood, Melbourne and Essendon selected a full complement, whilst Brisbane Lions and St Kilda declined to take part.

Pick	Player	Recruited from	AFL club
1	Jason Dylan	Port Adelaide	Port Adelaide
2	Adam Contessa	North Melbourne reserves	Western Bulldogs
3	Nathan Bassett	Norwood	Melbourne
4	Cameron Venables	Subiaco	Fremantle
5	Ben Marsh	West Adelaide	Adelaide
6	Mal Michael	Collingwood reserves	Collingwood
7	Justin Plapp	Burnie	Richmond
8	Brad L. Campbell	Kyabram	Hawthorn
9	Michael Brown	Fitzroy reserves	Geelong
10	Mark Porter	Coburg	Carlton
11	Paul Blair	Subiaco	West Coast
12	Mark Johnson	Calder U18	Essendon
13	Pass		Brisbane
14	Nathan Tresize	Murray U18	Sydney
15	Julian Kirzner	Carlton reserves	North Melbourne
16	Luke Ottens	Glenelg	Port Adelaide
17	Jason Lappin	Western Bulldogs reserves	Western Bulldogs
18	Daniel Ward	Fitzroy reserves	Melbourne
19	Matthew Richter	Claremont	Fremantle
20	Steven Coghill	West Adelaide	Adelaide
21	Andrew Pugsley	Eastern U18	Collingwood
22	Jason Ramsey	Fitzroy	Richmond
23	Pass		Hawthorn
24	Shawn Lewfatt	Essendon	Geelong
25	Pass		Carlton
26	Ryan Webb	West Perth	West Coast
27	Gary Moorcroft	Essendon reserves	Essendon
28	Pass		Brisbane
29	Pass		Sydney
30	Bryan Beinke	Port Adelaide	North Melbourne
31	Pass		Port Adelaide
32	Pass		Western Bulldogs
33	Matthew Bishop	Box Hill	Melbourne
34	Rupert Betheras	East Perth	Fremantle
35	Pass		Adelaide
36	Michael Polley	Melbourne	Collingwood
37	Pass		Richmond
38	Pass		Hawthorn
39	Pass		Geelong
40	Pass		Carlton
41	Trent Simpson	Subiaco	West Coast
42	Andrew Ramsden	Old Trinity	Essendon
43	Pass		Brisbane
44	Pass		Sydney
45	Pass		North Melbourne
46	Pass		Port Adelaide
47	Pass		Western Bulldogs
48	Russell Robertson	Melbourne	Melbourne
49	Scott Gooch	Fremantle	Fremantle
50	Pass		Adelaide
51	Brett Warburton	Carlton reserves	Collingwood
52	Pass		Richmond
53	Pass		Hawthorn
54	Pass		Geelong
55	Pass		Carlton
56	Todd Nener	East Perth	West Coast
57	Luke Trew	Western Bulldogs	Essendon
58	Pass		Brisbane
59	Steven Mahar	Belconnen	Sydney
60	Pass		North Melbourne
61	Pass		Port Adelaide
62	Pass		Western Bulldogs
63	Duncan O'Toole	Melbourne	Melbourne
64	Gavin Milentis	Claremont	Fremantle
65	Pass		Adelaide
66	Peter O'Brien	Old Melburnians	Collingwood
67	Pass		Richmond
68	Pass		Hawthorn
69	Pass		Geelong
70	Pass		Carlton
71	Pass		West Coast
72	Andrew Henderson	University Blues	Essendon
73	Pass		Brisbane
74	Leigh Marshall	Sydney	Sydney
75	Pass		North Melbourne
76	Pass		Port Adelaide
77	Pass		Western Bulldogs
78	James McDonald	Old Xaverians	Melbourne
79	Pass		Fremantle
80	Pass		Adelaide
81	Mark Oxley	Castlemaine	Collingwood
82	Pass		Richmond
83	Pass		Hawthorn
84	Pass		Geelong
85	Pass		Carlton
86	Pass		West Coast
87	Damien Franken	Donvale	Essendon
88	Pass		Brisbane
89	Adam Ryder	Belconnen	Sydney
90	Pass		North Melbourne

== Port Adelaide zone selections ==
As part of Port Adelaide's entry to the AFL they were entitled to recruit some uncontracted players from other AFL clubs and players from the SANFL prior to the national draft. Clubs that lost players were entitled to compensation selections before both the first and second rounds of the 1996 national draft.

=== Uncontracted player selection ===
- Ian Downsborough (West Coast): compensation selections #1 (Michael Gardiner) and #24 (Josh Wooden)
- Gavin Wanganeen (Essendon): compensation selections #2 (Chris Heffernan) and #25 (Andrew Bomford)
- Matthew Primus (Fitzroy): compensation selections #3 (Rory Hilton) and #26 (Tim Notting) to Brisbane Lions
- Adam Heuskes (Sydney): compensation selections #4 (Mark Kinnear) and #27 (Troy Cook)
- Scott Cummings (Essendon): compensation selections #5 (Daniel McAlister) and #28 (Jason Johnson)

=== Zone selections ===
Player	Recruited from
Nathan Eagleton	West Adelaide
Tom Harley	Norwood
Peter Burgoyne	Port Adelaide
Stuart Dew	Central District
Fabian Francis	Port Adelaide
Josh Francou	North Adelaide
Roger James	Norwood
Brendon Lade	South Adelaide
Darren Mead	Port Adelaide
Nathan Steinberner	Central District
Warren Tredrea	Port Adelaide
Michael Wilson	Port Adelaide
Stephen Daniels	Norwood
Donald Dickie	Norwood
Paul Evans	Port Adelaide
Scott Bassett	Norwood
Rhett Biglands	Woodville-West Torrens
Tom Carr	Port Adelaide
Stephen Carter	Port Adelaide
Mark Conway	Central District
Jarrod Cotton	Central District
Nigel Fiegert	Port Adelaide
Scott Freeborn	Woodville-West Torrens
Jake Lynch	Woodville-West Torrens
Scott Mathews	Woodville-West Torrens
Andrew Osborn	South Adelaide
Darryl Poole	Port Adelaide
Damian Squire	North Adelaide
Jonathon Yerbury	Norwood

== Brisbane Lions pre-draft selections ==
As part of the conditions of the merger between Brisbane Bears and the Fitzroy Football Club, Brisbane was able to recruit up to eight players from Fitzroy into the newly created Brisbane Lions.

- Scott Bamford
- John Barker
- Brad Boyd
- Nick Carter
- Shane Clayton
- Simon Hawking
- Chris Johnson
- Jarrod Molloy
