= List of Port Adelaide Football Club players =

Since becoming a member of the Australian Football League (AFL) in 1997, 215 players have represented the Port Adelaide Football Club in a senior AFL match. (Note: A senior AFL match is an Australian rules football match between two clubs that are, or have been in the past, members of the AFL. A senior AFL match is played under the laws of Australian football, and includes regular season matches, as well as finals series matches. It does not include pre-season competition matches, interstate matches or international rules football matches.) The list below is arranged in the order in which each player made his debut for Port Adelaide in a senior AFL match. Where more than one player made his debut in the same match, those players are listed alphabetically by surname.

Port Adelaide's first AFL game was played against the Collingwood Football Club at the Melbourne Cricket Ground (MCG) in Melbourne, Victoria on 29 March 1997. Port Adelaide has contested two AFL Grand Finals, and have succeeded in winning one of these Grand Finals to claim the 2004 AFL Premiership. There have been 22 players who have played in an AFL premiership-winning side for Port Adelaide.

== Port Adelaide Football Club players in the AFL (1997–present) ==
Players are listed in order of debut, and statistics are for AFL regular season and finals series matches only. "Career span" years are from the season of the player's debut for Port Adelaide to the year in which they played their final game for Port Adelaide and have since been removed from the playing list. Currently listed players are shaded in green, marked with a # and their career span is listed as "(year of debut)–present". Statistics are correct to the end of 2025.

Legend

^ Currently listed players

- AFL premiership player

- AFL captain

=== 1990s ===
Cap	Name	Career span	Debut	Games	Goals
1	Shane Bond	1997–2000	round 1, 1997	57	11
2	Shayne Breuer	1997–1999	round 1, 1997	54	29
3	David Brown	1997–1998	round 1, 1997	22	18
4	Peter Burgoyne	1997–2009	round 1, 1997	240	193
5	Stephen Carter	1997	round 1, 1997	10	0
6	Scott Cummings	1997–1998	round 1, 1997	37	102
7	Donald Dickie	1997–2000	round 1, 1997	55	19
8	Ian Downsborough	1997	round 1, 1997	7	2
9	Fabian Francis	1997–2001	round 1, 1997	86	44
10	Josh Francou	1997–2005	round 1, 1997	156	72
11	Brent Heaver	1997–1998	round 1, 1997	16	13
12	Adam Heuskes	1997–1998	round 1, 1997	37	1
13	Adam Kingsley	1997–2006	round 1, 1997	170	47
14	Brendon Lade	1997–2009	round 1, 1997	234	182
15	Brayden Lyle	1997–2001	round 1, 1997	90	12
16	Darren Mead	1997–2002	round 1, 1997	122	8
17	Stephen Paxman	1997–2003	round 1, 1997	138	20
18	Darryl Poole	1997–1999	round 1, 1997	24	11
19	Matthew Primus	1997–2005	round 1, 1997	137	76
20	Damian Squire	1997	round 1, 1997	5	4
21	Michael Wilson	1997–2008	round 1, 1997	192	51
22	Nigel Fiegert	1997–1999	round 2, 1997	19	6
23	Bowen Lockwood	1997–2001	round 2, 1997	50	45
24	Warren Tredrea	1997–2010	round 2, 1997	255	549
25	Gavin Wanganeen	1997–2006	round 2, 1997	173	138
26	Tom Carr	1997–1999	round 4, 1997	5	0
27	Stephen Daniels	1997–2000	round 4, 1997	58	2
28	Nathan Eagleton	1997–1999	round 5, 1997	56	45
29	Roger James	1997–2005	round 5, 1997	147	87
30	John Rombotis	1997	round 8, 1997	9	5
31	Jarrod Cotton	1997	round 10, 1997	4	4
32	Mark Conway	1997	round 14, 1997	1	0
33	Stuart Dew	1997–2006	round 15, 1997	180	245
34	Nathan Steinberner	1997–2001	round 21, 1997	20	3
35	Paul Geister	1997	round 22, 1997	1	0
36	Matthew Bode	1998–2000	round 1, 1998	29	25
37	Danny Morton	1998–2000	round 1, 1998	20	17
38	Chris Naish	1998–1999	round 1, 1998	18	16
39	Paul Evans	1998	round 6, 1998	6	5
40	Nick Stevens	1998–2003	round 6, 1998	127	78
41	Brett Chalmers	1998–1999	round 8, 1998	25	12
42	Mark Harwood	1998–2001	round 10, 1998	30	19
43	Tom Harley	1998	round 14, 1998	1	1
44	Che Cockatoo-Collins	1999–2003	round 1, 1999	75	106
45	Barnaby French	1999–2002	round 1, 1999	62	20
46	Jared Poulton	1999–2005	round 1, 1999	88	20
47	Jarrad Schofield	1999–2004	round 1, 1999	131	91
48	Derek Murray	1999–2002	round 5, 1999	23	7
49	Chad Cornes	1999–2011	round 6, 1999	239	175
50	Scott Bassett	1999–2002	round 14, 1999	15	2
51	Michael Stevens	1999–2002	round 17, 1999	17	3

=== 2000s ===
Cap	Name	Career span	Debut	Games	Goals
52	Brett Montgomery	2000–2005	round 1, 2000	126	51
53	Steven Brosnan	2000	round 3, 2000	1	0
54	Matthew Bishop	2000–2006	round 4, 2000	132	4
55	Josh Carr	2000–2004, 2009–2010	round 8, 2000	124	65
56	Brent Guerra	2000–2003	round 12, 2000	65	39
57	Paul Koulouriotis	2000	round 18, 2000	3	0
58	Cain Ackland	2001	round 1, 2001	12	3
59	Darryl Wakelin	2001–2007	round 1, 2001	146	4
60	Dean Brogan	2001–2011	round 9, 2001	174	50
61	Kane Cornes	2001–2015	round 10, 2001	300	93
62	Damien Hardwick	2002–2004	round 2, 2002	54	1
63	Shaun Burgoyne	2002–2009	round 3, 2002	157	171
64	Domenic Cassisi	2002–2014	round 14, 2002	228	74
65	Adam Morgan	2002–2003	round 15, 2002	3	0
66	Jaxon Crabb	2002	round 18, 2002	4	0
67	Allan Murray	2002	round 19, 2002	1	0
68	Stuart Cochrane	2003–2005	round 1, 2003	54	6
69	Byron Pickett	2003–2005	round 1, 2003	55	80
70	Steven Salopek	2003–2012	round 1, 2003	121	53
71	Toby Thurstans	2003–2009	round 1, 2003	110	55
72	Chris Hall	2003	round 3, 2003	2	0
73	Michael Pettigrew	2004–2011	round 1, 2004	103	25
74	Jacob Surjan	2004–2012	round 1, 2004	121	17
75	Brett Ebert	2004–2013	round 2, 2004	166	240
76	Troy Chaplin	2004–2012	round 4, 2004	137	10
77	Josh Mahoney	2004–2007	round 4, 2004	67	77
78	Brad Symes	2004–2007	round 8, 2004	20	2
79	Damon White	2004–2008	round 8, 2004	55	47
80	Aaron Shattock	2005–2006	round 1, 2005	11	1
81	Peter Walsh	2005–2006	round 1, 2005	35	6
82	Ben Eckermann	2005	round 7, 2005	4	0
83	Adam Thomson	2005–2008	round 11, 2005	28	16
84	Stephen Gilham	2005	round 18, 2005	1	0
85	Danyle Pearce	2005–2012	round 18, 2005	147	74
86	Daniel Motlop	2006–2011	round 1, 2006	83	155
87	Nathan Lonie	2006–2008	round 2, 2006	40	16
88	Fabian Deluca	2006–2008	round 5, 2006	11	1
89	James Ezard	2006	round 8, 2006	4	1
90	Elijah Ware	2006	round 12, 2006	2	1
91	Matt Thomas	2006–2013	round 14, 2006	87	30
92	Tom Logan	2006–2014	round 15, 2006	114	27
93	Alipate Carlile	2006–2016	round 16, 2006	167	5
94	Greg Bentley	2006–2008	round 19, 2006	21	6
95	Nick Lower	2006–2009	round 19, 2006	20	0
96	Ryan Willits	2006	round 20, 2006	3	1
97	Adam Cockshell	2007	round 1, 2007	2	1
98	Nathan Krakouer	2007–2010, 2015–2017	round 1, 2007	69	16
99	David Rodan	2007–2012	round 1, 2007	111	86
100	Robbie Gray	2007–2022	round 10, 2007	271	367
101	Justin Westhoff	2007–2020	round 10, 2007	248	291
102	Travis Boak	2007–2025	round 12, 2007	387	215
103	Paul Stewart	2008–2016	round 1, 2008	101	33
104	Mitch Farmer	2008–2009	round 18, 2008	3	0
105	Nick Salter	2008–2011	round 18, 2008	21	12
106	Ryan Williams	2008	round 19, 2008	2	0
107	Matthew Westhoff	2008–2011	round 20, 2008	6	5
108	Marlon Motlop	2008–2009	round 21, 2008	5	2
109	Wade Thompson	2009	round 3, 2009	2	0
110	Hamish Hartlett	2009–2021	round 4, 2009	193	77
111	Jason Davenport	2009–2011	round 7, 2009	28	29
112	Danny Meyer	2009–2010	round 12, 2009	9	1
113	Matthew Broadbent	2009–2019	round 16, 2009	171	52

=== 2010s ===
Cap	Name	Career span	Debut	Games	Goals
114	Mitch Banner	2010–2011	round 1, 2010	19	16
115	Scott Harding	2010	round 1, 2010	2	0
116	Cameron Hitchcock	2010–2014	round 1, 2010	35	31
117	Andrew Moore	2010–2015	round 1, 2010	55	18
118	Jay Schulz	2010–2016	round 1, 2010	123	275
119	Jackson Trengove	2010–2017	round 1, 2010	153	30
120	Cameron Cloke	2010	round 3, 2010	1	0
121	Daniel Stewart	2010–2013	round 4, 2010	36	31
122	Matthew Lobbe	2010–2017	round 5, 2010	92	21
123	Jay Nash	2010	round 9, 2010	8	0
124	Jarrad Irons	2011	round 11, 2010	3	3
125	Cam O'Shea	2011–2016	round 1, 2011	81	7
126	Jasper Pittard	2011–2018	round 1, 2011	126	11
127	Simon Phillips	2011–2012	round 7, 2011	9	7
128	Ben Jacobs	2011–2012	round 8, 2011	26	5
129	John Butcher	2011–2016	round 21, 2011	31	41
130	Tom Jonas	2011–2023	round 21, 2011	215	2
131	Brad Ebert	2012–2020	round 1, 2012	184	107
132	John McCarthy	2012	round 1, 2012	21	5
133	Jarrad Redden	2012–2015	round 1, 2012	16	3
134	Chad Wingard	2012–2018	round 1, 2012	147	232
135	Darren Pfeiffer	2012–2013	round 4, 2012	16	2
136	Brent Renouf	2012–2014	round 4, 2012	16	4
137	Aaron Young	2012–2017	round 5, 2012	76	62
138	Nathan Blee	2012–2013	round 20, 2012	6	0
139	Campbell Heath	2013–2014	round 1, 2013	12	3
140	Kane Mitchell	2013–2016	round 1, 2013	35	19
141	Angus Monfries	2013–2017	round 1, 2013	61	83
142	Jake Neade	2013–2018	round 1, 2013	66	55
143	Lewis Stevenson	2013–2014	round 1, 2013	9	0
144	Ollie Wines^	2013–	round 1, 2013	292	106
145	Sam Colquhoun	2013–2016	round 7, 2013	16	3
146	Jack Hombsch	2013–2018	round 10, 2013	89	1
147	Tom Clurey	2014–2024	round 1, 2014	124	0
148	Jarman Impey	2014–2017	round 1, 2014	75	34
149	Jared Polec	2014–2018	round 1, 2014	90	46
150	Matthew White	2014–2017	round 1, 2014	48	44
151	Sam Gray	2014–2019	round 4, 2014	96	83
152	Ben Newton	2014	round 7, 2014	4	0
153	Paddy Ryder	2015–2019	round 1, 2015	73	54
154	Brendon Ah Chee	2015–2017	round 3, 2015	27	17
155	Karl Amon	2015–2022	round 7, 2015	124	55
156	Charlie Dixon	2015–2024	round 7, 2015	156	263
157	Dougal Howard	2016–2019	round 2, 2016	45	14
158	Jimmy Toumpas	2016–2018	round 2, 2016	10	1
159	Darcy Byrne-Jones^	2016–	round 3, 2016	243	76
160	Logan Austin	2016–2017	round 11, 2016	13	0
161	Jesse Palmer	2016–2017	round 21, 2016	3	0
162	Riley Bonner	2016–2023	round 23, 2016	93	11
163	Will Snelling	2016–2018	round 23, 2016	1	1
164	Brett Eddy	2017	round 1, 2017	3	3
165	Dan Houston	2017–2024	round 1, 2017	167	41
166	Sam Powell-Pepper^	2017–	round 1, 2017	158	124
167	Aidyn Johnson	2017–2019	round 5, 2017	11	8
168	Joe Atley	2017–2020	round 16, 2017	4	0
169	Todd Marshall^	2017–	round 22, 2017	131	167
170	Dom Barry	2018	round 1, 2018	5	0
171	Steven Motlop	2018–2022	round 1, 2018	82	54
172	Tom Rockliff	2018–2021	round 1, 2018	54	13
173	Jack Watts	2018–2020	round 1, 2018	21	18
174	Trent McKenzie	2018–2024	round 4, 2018	59	1
175	Lindsay Thomas	2018	round 5, 2018	7	4
176	Jack Trengove	2018–2019	round 15, 2018	3	0
177	Jarrod Lienert	2018–2021	round 18, 2018	23	1
178	Kane Farrell^	2018–	round 19, 2018	127	51
179	Billy Frampton	2018–2019	round 23, 2018	3	4
180	Ryan Burton	2019–2025	round 1, 2019	115	20
181	Zak Butters	2019–2026	round 1, 2019	156	73
182	Willem Drew^	2019–	round 1, 2019	152	23
183	Xavier Duursma	2019–2023	round 1, 2019	73	33
184	Scott Lycett	2019–2023	round 1, 2019	71	16
185	Connor Rozee^	2019–	round 1, 2019	152	124
186	Joel Garner	2019–2021	round 9, 2019	4	0
187	Peter Ladhams	2019–2021	round 10, 2019	59	59
188	Cameron Sutcliffe	2019–2020	round 17, 2019	9	5

=== 2020s ===
Cap	Name	Career span	Debut	Games	Goals
189	Mitch Georgiades^	2020–	round 1, 2020	113	218
190	Sam Mayes	2022	round 7, 2020	17	6
191	Boyd Woodcock	2020	round 10, 2020	12	7
192	Aliir Aliir^	2021–	round 1, 2021	136	2
193	Miles Bergman^	2020–	round 1, 2021	118	30
194	Orazio Fantasia	2021–2023	round 1, 2021	19	30
195	Lachie Jones^	2021–	round 4, 2021	94	9
196	Martin Frederick	2021–2022	round 6, 2021	14	2
197	Dylan Williams	2021–2025	round 15, 2021	29	0
198	Jed McEntee	2021–2025	round 18, 2021	52	31
199	Jeremy Finlayson	2022–2025	round 1, 2022	62	76
200	Jackson Mead	2022–2026	round 1, 2022	74	13
201	Josh Sinn^	2022–	round 2, 2022	30	1
202	Sam Skinner	2022	round 2, 2022	2	0
203	Trent Dumont	2022–2023	round 4, 2022	8	2
204	Sam Hayes	2022–2023	round 5, 2022	11	0
205	Brynn Teakle	2022–2023	round 14, 2022	6	1
206	Jase Burgoyne^	2022–	round 16, 2022	79	20
207	Francis Evans	2023–2024	round 1, 2023	27	19
208	Jason Horne-Francis^	2023–	round 1, 2023	84	84
209	Willie Rioli	2023–2025	round 1, 2023	58	91
210	Ollie Lord^	2023–	round 6, 2023	35	33
211	Quinton Narkle	2023–2024	round 14, 2023	16	8
212	Dante Visentini^	2023–	round 16, 2023	29	8
213	Esava Ratugolea^	2024–	round 1, 2024	44	4
214	Ivan Soldo	2024–2026	round 1, 2024	9	5
215	Brandon Zerk-Thatcher^	2024–	round 1, 2024	43	0
216	Jordon Sweet^	2024–	round 7, 2024	58	19
217	Logan Evans^	2024–	round 15, 2024	42	5
218	Will Lorenz	2024–2026	round 16, 2024	11	2
219	Joe Berry^	2025–	round 1, 2025	35	17
220	Jack Lukosius^	2025–	round 1, 2025	15	14
221	Joe Richards^	2025–	round 1, 2025	42	24
222	Christian Moraes^	2025–	round 2, 2025	26	5
223	Tom Cochrane^	2025–	round 3, 2025	6	4
224	Rory Atkins	2025	round 6, 2025	3	0
225	Hugh Jackson	2025	round 11, 2025	9	1
226	Mani Liddy	2025–2026	round 14, 2025	9	1
227	Jack Whitlock^	2025–	round 21, 2025	27	28
228	Ewan Mackinlay^	2025–	round 24, 2025	15	7
229	Harrison Ramm^	2025–	round 24, 2025	7	0
230	Corey Durdin^	2026–	round 1, 2026	23	32
231	Jack Watkins^	2026–	round 1, 2026	11	3
232	Jacob Wehr^	2026–	round 1, 2026	17	1
233	Will Brodie^	2026–	round 3, 2026	2	0
234	Josh Lai^	2026–	round 3, 2026	19	0
235	Mitch Zadow^	2026–	round 4, 2026	9	8
236	Tom Anastasopoulos^	2026–	round 10, 2026	5	2
237	Xavier Bamert^	2026–	round 14, 2026	10	6
238	Balyn O'Brien^	2026–	round 19, 2026	6	0
239	Alex Van Wyk^	2026–	round 22, 2026	3	0

== Listed players yet to make their debut for Port Adelaide ==
Player	Date of birth	Acquired	Recruited from	Listed	
Player	Date of birth	Acquired	Recruited from	Rookie	Senior
Nil

== Port Adelaide Football Club AFLW players ==
Key
Order	Players are listed in order of jumper number
Seasons	Includes Port Adelaide only careers and spans from when a player was first listed with the club to their final year on the list
Debut	Debuts are for AFLW regular season and finals series matches only
Games	Statistics are for AFLW regular season and finals games only and are correct to the end of 2025.
Goals	Statistics are for AFLW regular season and finals games only and are correct to the end of 2025.

=== 2020s ===
Cap	Player	Games	Goals	Playing Career
1	Erin Phillips	20	3	2022 ^{(S7)}–2023
2	Ebony O'Dea^	46	2	2022 ^{(S7)}–
3	Angela Foley	33	4	2022 ^{(S7)}–2024
4	Jade Halfpenny	6	1	2022 ^{(S7)}–2023
5	Abbey Dowrick^	44	9	2022 ^{(S7)}–
6	Jacqui Yorston	12	0	2022 ^{(S7)}–2023
7	Yasmin Duursma	11	0	2022 ^{(S7)}–2023
8	Tessa Doumanis	2	0	2022 ^{(S7)}
9	Maria Moloney^	43	5	2022 ^{(S7)}–
10	Indy Tahau^	26	30	2022 ^{(S7)}–
11	Jade De Melo	8	4	2022 ^{(S7)}–2023
12	Hannah Ewings	18	8	2022 ^{(S7)}–2024
13	Sarah Goodwin	5	0	2022 ^{(S7)}
14	Justine Mules-Robinson^	45	12	2022 ^{(S7)}–
15	Julia Teakle^	24	19	2022 ^{(S7)}–
16	Maggie MacLachlan	7	0	2022 ^{(S7)}–2023
17	Ella Boag^	37	7	2022 ^{(S7)}–
18	Olivia Levicki	25	6	2022 ^{(S7)}–2024
19	Alex Ballard	16	0	2022 ^{(S7)}–2024
20	Sachi Syme^	41	2	2022 ^{(S7)}–
21	Amelie Borg	45	0	2022 ^{(S7)}–
22	Lily Johnson	5	2	2022 ^{(S7)}–2023
23	Hannah Dunn	20	0	2022 ^{(S7)}–2024
24	Kate Surman	10	2	2022 ^{(S7)}
25	Gemma Houghton^	40	60	2022 ^{(S7)}–
26	Cheyenne Hammond^	39	1	2022 ^{(S7)}–
27	Liz McGrath	3	0	2022 ^{(S7)}
28	Litonya Cockatoo-Motlap	5	0	2022 ^{(S7)}–2023
29	Laquoiya Cockatoo-Motlap	1	0	2022 ^{(S7)}–2023
30	Brittany Perry	6	4	2022 ^{(S7)}
31	Ashleigh Woodland^	35	27	2023–
32	Jasmin Stewart	20	2	2023–2025
33	Janelle Cuthbertson	8	0	2023–2025
34	Madeline Keryk	9	3	2023–2024
35	Matilda Scholz^	35	11	2023–
36	Jasmine Simmons	3	0	2023–2024
37	Katelyn Pope^	31	8	2023–
38	Molly Brooksby^	16	0	2024–
39	Teagan Germech^	26	0	2024–
40	Shineah Goody^	26	4	2024–
41	Caitlin Wendland^	14	9	2024–
42	Piper Window^	17	2	2024–
43	Kirsty Lamb^	18	6	2024–
44	Alissa Brook	10	0	2024–2025
45	Jo Miller	2	2	2024
46	Ella Heads^	12	2	2025–
47	Jasmine Sowden^	11	2	2025–
48	Lily Paterson	6	0	2025
49	Chloe Gaunt^	7	2	2025–
50	Jasmine Evans^	5	0	2025–
51	Lauren Young^	4	2	2025–
52	Olivia Crane^	1	0	2026–
53	Sophie Eaton^	1	0	2026–
54	Emily Elkington^	1	0	2026–

=== Listed players yet to play a senior game for Port Adelaide ===
Player	Draft	Recruited From			
Player	Draft	Recruited From	Jemma Charity	2024 draft, pick 53	West Adelaide
Lucy Boyd	2025 trade period	West Coast Eagles			
Ellie Hampson	2025 trade period	Brisbane Lions			
Grace Parsons	Replacement player	Sydney Swans Academy			

=== Listed players who didn't play a senior game for Port Adelaide ===
Player	Acquired	Time listed			
Player	Acquired	Time listed	Georgie Jaques	2023 supplementary draft, pick 16	2023–2024
Coby Morgan	Injury replacement player	2025			
