= Ivanhoe Grammar School =

Location
- Ivanhoe & Mernda, Victoria; Australia
- Coordinates: 37°46′30″S 145°2′39″E

Information
- Type: private school, co-educational, day school
- Motto: Latin: Fidelis Usque Ad Mortem (Faithful even unto death)
- Denomination: Anglican
- Established: 1915
- Chairman: D Proietto
- Principal: Gerard Foley
- Chaplain: Andrew Fox, Pieter Keuneman
- Years offered: ELC–12
- Gender: Co-educational
- Enrolment: 2,600 (ELC–12)
- Colours: Brown & white
- Slogan: Courageous and Kind
- Affiliation: Associated Grammar Schools of Victoria
- Alumni: Old Ivanhoe Grammarians
- Website: www.ivanhoe.com.au

Ivanhoe Grammar School is a private, co-educational, Anglican, day school, with campuses located in Ivanhoe (Buckley House and The Ridgeway Campus), and Doreen (Plenty Campus), both located in the north-eastern suburbs of Melbourne, Victoria, Australia.

Founded in 1915 as St James' Grammar School for boys, Ivanhoe Grammar is a school of the Anglican Church of Australia, and caters for approximately 2,600 students from the Early Learning Centre to Year 12, across four campuses, with the fourth being a university-integrated campus at La Trobe University, named the University Campus.

The school is affiliated with the Headmasters' and Headmistresses' Conference, the Association of Heads of Independent Schools of Australia, the Junior School Heads Association of Australia, and is a founding member of the Associated Grammar Schools of Victoria. The school is a former member of the G20 Schools Group. Ivanhoe Grammar School is also one of only four Round Square schools in the state of Victoria, and has been an International Baccalaureate World School since December 1994.

== History ==
In 1915, St James' Grammar School was established in Parish Hall at St James' Church. The school moved to its current site, Ivanhoe House at The Ridgeway, and changed its name to Ivanhoe Grammar School in 1920. Locksley House opened in 1924; it is located on the far south of Ridgeway Campus and today it is utilised for teaching English to ESL students, music and performing and fine art. The headmaster's residence, now the School House Administration Building, was built in 1928.

The first international students arrived at Ivanhoe Grammar School in 1941. In 1942, the school as occupied by the armed forces and the school relocated to Yea and St James' Parish Church. The Memorial Junior School, now Buckley House, opened in 1955. The first cadet unit formed in 1961. In 1964, the entire senior school moved from Locksley House to Ivanhoe House site, with Locksley becoming the boarding school. In 1967, the re-built Buckley Hall opened.

In 1977, after 62 years, Ivanhoe cancelled its boarding program and Locksley House became the middle school for year 7 and 8 students and Sherwood, whose membership was formerly exclusive to boarders, becomes the fourth day house.

In 1978, the Country Centre opened.

In 1985, land was purchased in the Plenty Valley (Mernda).

Ivanhoe Grammar School's Mernda Campus (later renamed the Plenty Campus) opened in 1990. In 1992, the Mernda Campus became co-educational.

The International Baccalaureate was made available at The Ridgeway Secondary Campus in 1996. In 1998, a new school uniform was introduced and the Memorial Junior School was renamed to Buckley House.

In 1999, Buckley House and The Ridgeway Campus went co-educational.

In 2001, the re-developed V.R.C Brown Centre and F.O. Watts Building open at the Ridgeway Secondary Campus, with a new school library.

2003 was the first year in which girls were admitted to the year 7 student intake to Ivanhoe/Ridgeway campus.

The Creative Arts Centre at Plenty Campus opened in 2005.

In 2007, the new T.R Lee Science Building was opened by the governor of Victoria.

Also in 2007, Ivanhoe Grammar School established an equestrian training centre at Mernda Campus.

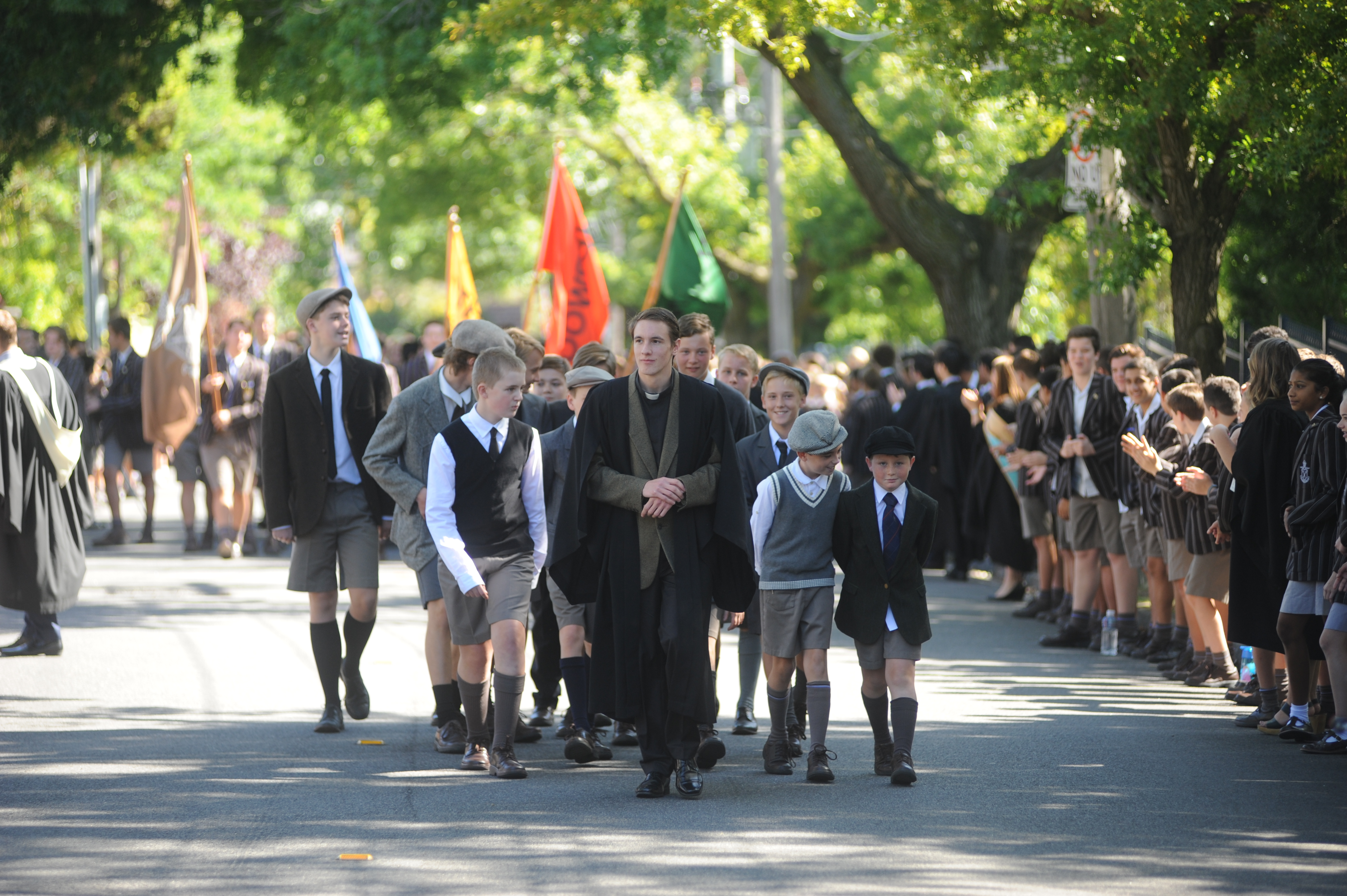
The Centenary Procession

In June 2015, Ivanhoe Grammar teacher Graeme Harder pleaded guilty to multiple sex offences against a male between the ages of 10 and 16. Harder had been with the school for at least 30 years. The offences occurred between 1 April 1991 and 22 April 1992, with Harder suspended from the school on 4 March, the day he was charged with the offences. His suspension was not communicated to students and parents until a week later, on 11 March.

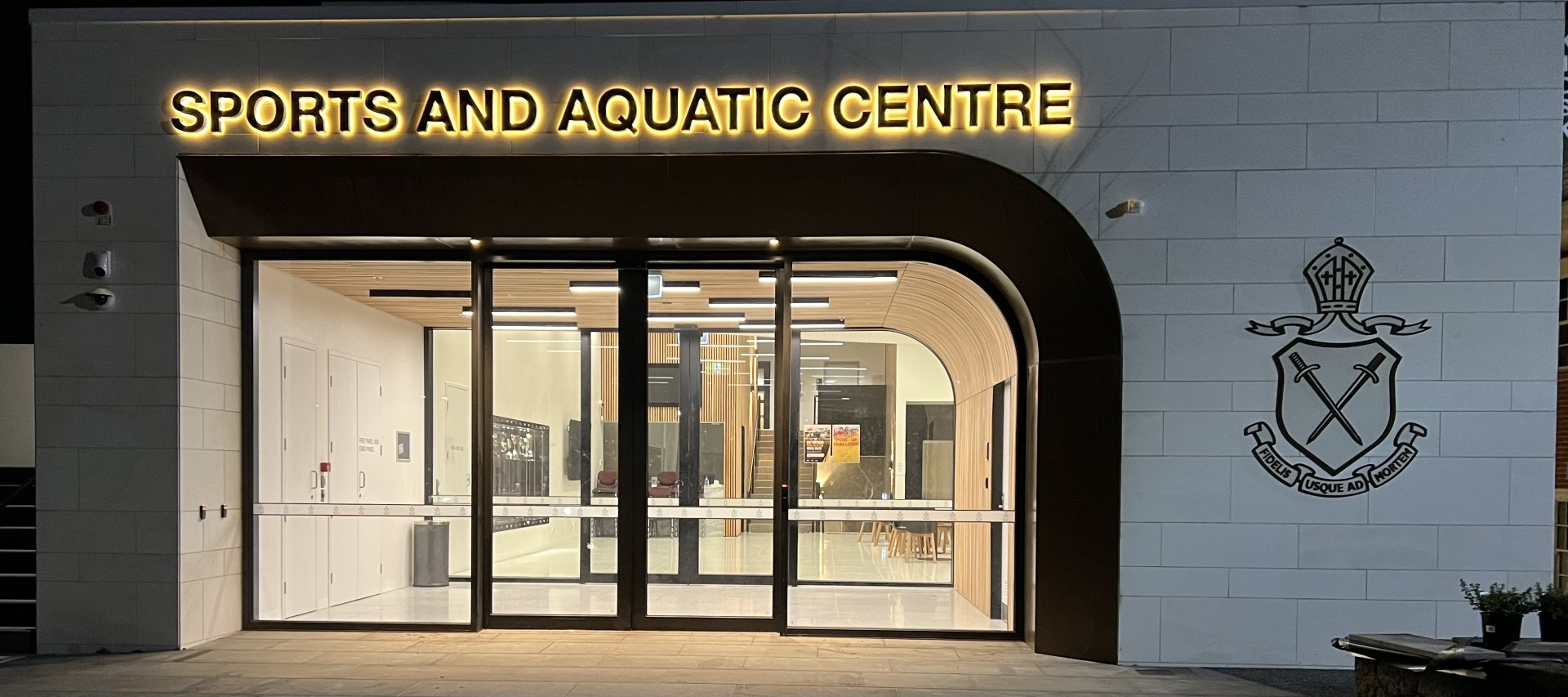
Sports and Aquatic Centre

In 2017, construction of a new car park located under the school oval began; it was completed in mid–2018. Following the completion of this project, work began on a new multi-level Sports and Aquatic Centre at the Ridgeway Campus, located in the Locksley area of the Ridgeway Campus. This complex, comprising four basketball / multi purpose courts, a 52 metre pool, weights room, aerobics studio and roof-top tennis courts, was opened in June 2022.

In May 2020, Ivanhoe narrowly avoided an appearance before the Fair Work Commission following staff layoffs in response to funding difficulties during the COVID-19 pandemic. The Independent Education Union was to argue that a "downturn in work does not justify Victorian school Ivanhoe Grammar's stand-downs of non-teaching staff under the Fair Work Act."

Campuses

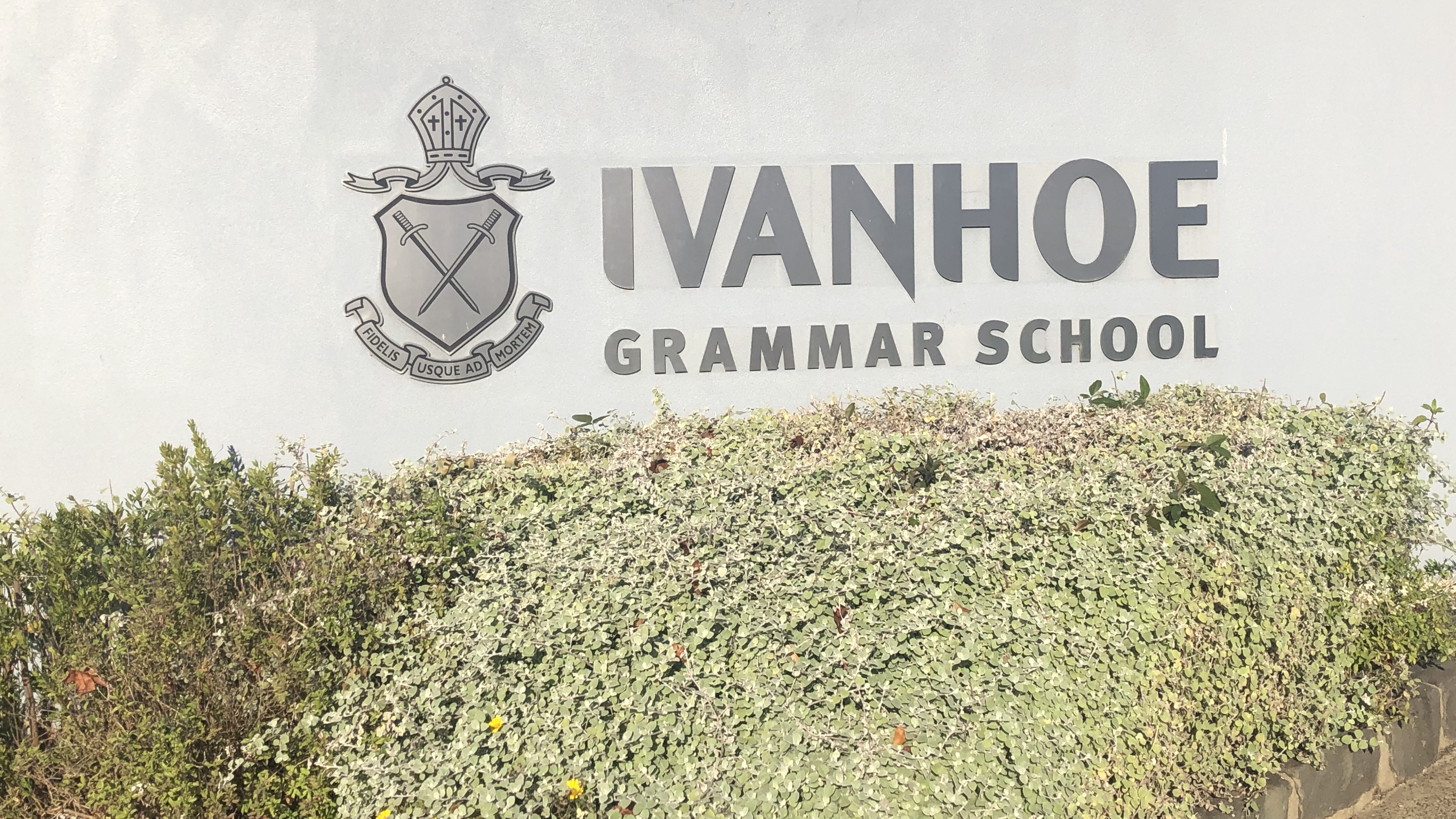

Ivanhoe Grammar School is currently located over four campuses

- Buckley House (formerly The Memorial Junior School), Ivanhoe. Years: Early Learning Centre (Age 3+) to Grade 6.
- The Ridgeway Campus, Ivanhoe. Years: 7–12.
- Plenty Campus (formerly the Mernda Campus), Doreen. Years: Prep–12.
- La Trobe University Campus, Year 9 Students Only

The school also has three former campuses: Parish Hall at St James' Church (1915–1920), Yea, Victoria – The school was relocated to Yea during WWII, and "Charnwood" (later renamed "Strathbogie"), Lima East, Victoria – The school's country centre was opened in 1978.

=== The Ridgeway Campus ===
The Ridgeway Campus encompasses Year 7 to 12 and is located in Ivanhoe, a suburb located approximately 12 kilometres north-east of the Melbourne central business district. For students in Year 11 and 12, the Ridgeway Campus offers the state's traditional Victorian Certificate of Education qualification, or the internationally recognised International Baccalaureate Programme. The Ridgeway Campus is co-educational.

=== Plenty Campus ===
The Plenty Campus (formerly the Mernda Campus) was founded in 1990, and is co-educational from Prep to Year 12. It is located in Bridge Inn Rd, Doreen, an outer suburb north of Melbourne. The Plenty Campus offers only the Victorian Certificate of Education to Years 11 and 12, however students at the Plenty Campus can choose to transfer to the Ridgeway Campus to study the International Baccalaureate for their final two years of schooling.

=== Buckley House ===
Also located in Ivanhoe, the Memorial Junior School was opened in 1955, and was built using the donations from the families of old boys who died in the Second World War. It was renamed "Buckley House" in 1998. In memory of the old boys who died, there now stands a small stone memorial.

Buckley House is Ivanhoe's primary school, accepting students from ELC 3 to Year 6, and is located on the north side of the Ridgeway Campus.

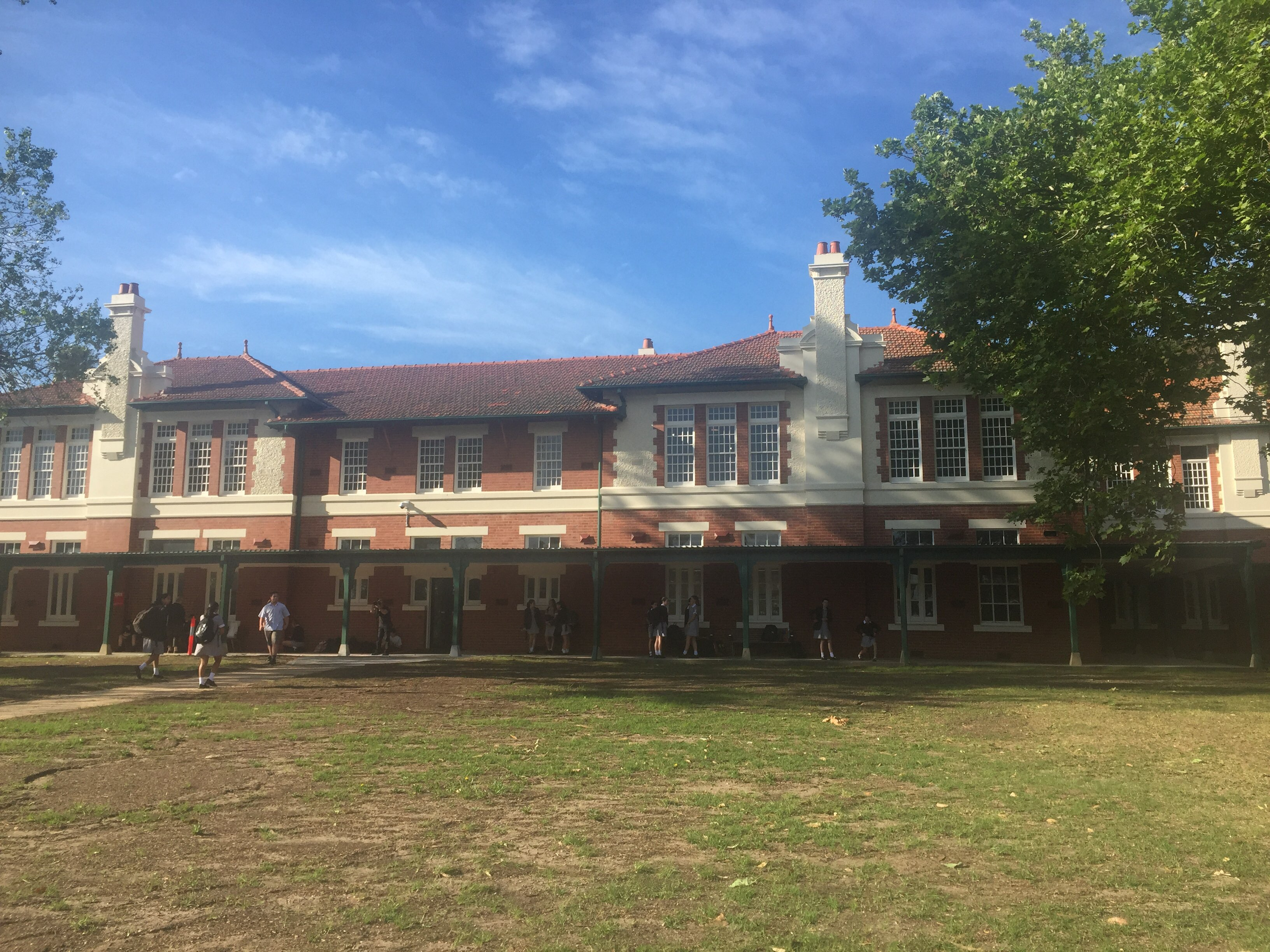
The university campus opened in late 2018.

=== La Trobe University Campus ===
In 2018, Ivanhoe Grammar announced a partnership with La Trobe University in which Year 9 classes would be held on the university property. The campus opened for the 2019 school year and provided a year-long course with use of university facilities and input from university personnel.

== Sport ==
Ivanhoe Grammar School is a member of the Associated Grammar Schools of Victoria (AGSV).

=== AGSV and AGSV/APS premierships ===
Ivanhoe Grammar School has won the following AGSV and AGSV/APS premierships.

Boys:

- Athletics (20) – 1922, 1923, 1925, 1927, 1933, 1948, 1988, 1989, 1990, 1991, 1992, 1993, 1994, 1997, 1998, 1999, 2000, 2001, 2002, 2003
- Badminton (3) – 1997, 2001, 2013
- Basketball (7) – 1993, 1994, 1995, 2002, 2003, 2005, 2018
- Cricket (10) – 1937, 1950, 1959, 1962, 1997, 1998, 1999, 2001, 2002, 2021
- Cross Country (8) – 1991. 1992, 1993, 1994, 1995, 1996, 1997, 1999
- Football (9) – 1934, 1935, 1936, 1941, 1944, 1957, 1958, 1963, 2023
- Golf – 2002
- Hockey (2) – 1992, 1993
- Soccer (5) – 1997, 2003, 2004, 2012, 2014
- Squash (7) – 1995, 1996, 1997, 1998, 1999, 2005, 2006
- Swimming (20) – 1940, 1980, 1981, 1988, 1989, 1990, 1991, 1992, 1993, 1994, 1997, 1998, 1999, 2000, 2001, 2002, 2007, 2008, 2009, 2013
- Table Tennis – 2003
- Tennis (8) – 1927, 1929, 1950, 1951, 1962, 1969, 1970, 1985
- Volleyball (2) – 2021, 2022

Girls:

- Athletics (4) – 2014, 2016, 2017, 2018
- Basketball (2) – 2022, 2023
- Netball (3) – 2014, 2015, 2016
- Softball – 2013
- Swimming (7) – 2010, 2011, 2012, 2013, 2019, 2021, 2023
- Volleyball (4) – 2018, 2019, 2022, 2023

== Notable alumni ==
=== Entertainment, media and the arts ===
- Clifton Pugh – AO, was an Australian Figurative artist and three-time winner of Australia's Archibald Prize
- Wilbur Wilde – saxophonist
- Tarik Frimpong – actor

=== Politics, armed services, public service and the law ===
- John Ingles Richardson – former Member of the Legislative Assembly, (Liberal) for Forest Hill; former chairman of the Parliamentary Road Safety Committee; former chairman of the Planning Committee; former Shadow Minister for Community Services, Housing and Aboriginal Affairs (also attended Kerang High School)
- Harry Jenkins Sr. – former Speaker of the House of Representatives
- Harry Jenkins – former Speaker of the House of Representatives
- John Brumby – twice Premier of Victoria (1993–1999 & 2007–10), current chancellor of LaTrobe University
- Rowan Downing – President of the United Nations Dispute Tribunal, UN-appointed judge, Khmer Rouge War Crimes Tribunal, Cambodia & Justice, 2006–2014 Court of Appeal, Vanuatu

=== Business ===
- James Hogan – AO, former president and CEO of Etihad Airways, former CEO of Gulf Air

=== Sport ===
- Ben McKinley – AFL footballer
- Kyle Langford – AFL footballer
- Sam Grimley – AFL footballer
- Dylan Buckley – AFL footballer
- Lachlan Murphy – AFL footballer
- Ben Lennon – AFL footballer
- John Stevens – AFL footballer
- Aaron Lord – AFL footballer
- David O'Halloran – AFL footballer
- Mark Richardson – AFL footballer
- Mark Fraser – AFL footballer/umpire
- Sam Bramham – Paralympic gold medallist
- Alf Watson – 1928 and 1936 Olympian
- Brad Camp – 1988 Olympian (marathon)
- Alice Teague-Neeld – netballer
- Nikolas Cox – AFL player
- Patrick Naish – AFL and VFL player
- Tristan Carter – Paris 2024 Olympian (Canoe Slalom)

== See also ==
- List of schools in Victoria
- List of high schools in Victoria
