= Downsborough =

Downsborough is an English surname. Notable people with the surname include:

- Ian Downsborough (born 1972), Australian rules footballer
- Peter Downsborough (1943–2019), English footballer
