= Will Sangster =

Australian rules footballer

Personal information
- Full name: William Andrew Sangster
- Born: 11 October 1978 (age 48)
- Original team: Prahran Dragons
- Draft: 33rd, 1996 National Draft
- Height: 198 cm (6 ft 6 in)
- Weight: 94 kg (207 lb)

Playing career^{1}
Years	Club	Games (Goals)
1999	Sydney Swans	2 (0)
- ^{1} Playing statistics correct to the end of 1999.

William Andrew "Will" Sangster (born 11 October 1978) is a former Australian rules footballer who played with the Sydney Swans in the Australian Football League (AFL).

Sangster played his junior football at East Malvern and made TAC Cup appearances for the Prahran Dragons.

He was selected by Sydney with pick 33 in the 1996 National Draft.

A ruckman, Sangster made his debut against Hawthorn in round seven of the 1999 AFL season. He played his only other game the following week, against Geelong, sharing the ruck duties with Adam Goodes.

He later played for the Noble Park Football Club.

Sangster moved into the business world, in various roles within sales, marketing and general management focusing on US multinational companies spanning automotive and marine.
