= Nathan Turvey =

Australian rules footballer and harness racing driver and trainer

Personal information
- Full name: Nathan Turvey
- Born: 17 October 1977 (age 49)
- Original team: South Fremantle

Playing career^{1}
Years	Club	Games (Goals)
1998–1999	Hawthorn	10 (0)
- ^{1} Playing statistics correct to the end of 1999.

Nathan Turvey (born 17 October 1977) is a former Australian rules footballer who played with Hawthorn in the Australian Football League (AFL).

Hawthorn selected Turvey in the 1996 AFL draft from South Fremantle in the West Australian Football League (WAFL) with the 29th overall selection. He only played three games for Hawthorn in his first season due to finger tendon injuries. After only seven more games in 1999, the long-kicking left footer was delisted by Hawthorn prior to the 2000 season.

After a year in South Australia playing for South Adelaide, Turvey then returned to Western Australian where he continued to play for South Fremantle until 2003. He is also a highly rated harness racing trainer and driver, based in Narrogin, Western Australia.
