= Leigh Brockman =

Australian rules footballer

Personal information
- Full name: Leigh Brockman
- Born: 23 July 1978 (age 48)
- Original team: Tassie Mariners
- Draft: 8th, 1996 National Draft
- Height: 193 cm (6 ft 4 in)
- Weight: 92 kg (203 lb)

Playing career^{1}
Years	Club	Games (Goals)
1997-1998	Geelong	2 (1)
2000-2002	Sydney	10 (0)
Total		12 (1)
- ^{1} Playing statistics correct to the end of 2002.

Leigh Brockman (born 23 July 1978) is a former Australian rules footballer who played with Geelong and Sydney Swans in the Australian Football League (AFL).

Brockman joined Geelong via the 1996 National Draft with pick eight, but played only two senior AFL games for the club as he struggled with injuries. He was rookie listed by Sydney in 2000, then elevated to the senior list in 2002 and made 10 appearances that year. He went to Glenelg after leaving the AFL.
