= Michael Gardiner (footballer, born 1978) =

Australian rules footballer

Personal information
- Full name: Michael R. Gardiner
- Born: 22 March 1978 (age 48)
- Original team: Subiaco
- Draft: 19th, 1997 Pre-Season Draft
- Height: 197 cm (6 ft 6 in)
- Weight: 92 kg (203 lb)

Playing career^{1}
Years	Club	Games (Goals)
1998–1999	Collingwood	7 (1)
- ^{1} Playing statistics correct to the end of 1999.

Michael R. Gardiner (born 22 March 1978) is a former Australian rules footballer who played with Collingwood in the Australian Football League (AFL).

Gardiner, a basketball player in his youth, was used as a tall forward and ruckman by Collingwood, who selected him in the 1997 Pre-Season Draft. He played in the final two rounds of the 1998 AFL season and appeared in five games the following year.
