= Troy Gray =

Australian rules footballer, television producer, and presenter

Personal information
- Full name: Troy Gray
- Born: 26 February 1973 (age 53)
- Original team: Queanbeyan
- Height: 188 cm (6 ft 2 in)

Playing career^{1}
Years	Club	Games (Goals)
1992–1996	Sydney Swans	51 (24)
1997	St Kilda	9 (2)
Total		60 (26)
- ^{1} Playing statistics correct to the end of 1997.

Troy Gray (born 26 February 1973) is an Australian television producer, presenter and former Australian Football League (AFL) player. He played with the Sydney Swans and the St Kilda Football Club.

Originally from Canberra, Gray played with the Swans for five league seasons. He kicked four goals against the Brisbane Bears at the SCG in just his third AFL game. His best season was in 1995 when he appeared in 19 of the 22 rounds, playing as a defender.

Gray was traded to St Kilda after the season ended, in exchange for the 34th pick of the national draft, which was used on Shannon Corcoran. In the opening round of the 1997 AFL season, against Hawthorn, Gray had 22 disposals and kicked two goals.

He has since been involved in television and radio, and presented the news on the Nine Network.
