= Michael Polley (footballer) =

Australian rules footballer (born 1976)

Personal information
- Full name: Michael Polley
- Born: 14 September 1976 (age 50)
- Original team: Hadfield / Northern Knights / Prahran
- Draft: 34th overall, 1994 National Draft (Melbourne); 54th overall, 1997 Rookie Draft (Collingwood)
- Height: 180 cm (5 ft 11 in)
- Weight: 78 kg (172 lb)
- Position: Midfielder

Playing career^{1}
Years	Club	Games (Goals)
1995–1996	Melbourne	5 (0)
1997	Collingwood	0 (0)
Total		5 (0)
- ^{1} Playing statistics correct to the end of 1996.

Michael Polley (born 14 September 1976) is a former Australian rules footballer who played for Melbourne Football Club in the Australian Football League (AFL).

== Early life ==
Originally from Hadfield Football Club in the Essendon District Football League, Polley was selected to play for TAC Cup side, Northern Knights. Along with playing for the Knights, in 1994 Polley also played six games for Prahran Football Club in the Victorian Football Association. In the lead-up to the 1994 National Draft, Melbourne coach Neil Balme stated the Demons were looking for "the best available but with a bit of an emphasis on speed and midfield players". Polley, a midfielder known for his speed, was subsequently draft by Melbourne with the 34th selection in the draft.

== AFL career ==
An 18-year-old at the time he was drafted, Polley spent his first season with Melbourne developing in the reserves. For the last match of the 1995 home and away season, Polley was named as an emergency in the squad, but was not required to play. After a season's development, Polley was one of several young players at Melbourne that were expected to "take the next step" in 1996. Due to the Demons need for pace, Polley was named to make his AFL debut in the second round of the season, but was ultimately not selected. After being suspended for one week and injuring his hand in May, Polley finally made his AFL debut against Essendon in round 9. Despite having 15 disposals, Polley was dropped back to the reserves the following week. He was recalled for Melbourne's round 12 clash with the Brisbane Bears and retained his place in the side for four consecutive matches, until a poor performance against Richmond. Polley failed to play another senior match for the rest of the year and, at season's end, he was delisted by Melbourne.

After being delisted, Polley trained with Essendon in the hope of being drafted by the Bombers. Instead, it was Collingwood that selected Polley with the 54th selection in the 1997 Rookie Draft. Polley was unable to break into Collingwood's senior team and was delisted by the Magpies after only one season at the club.
