= Sandy Nelson (footballer) =

Australian rules footballer

Personal information
- Full name: Philip M. Nelson

Playing career^{1}
| Years | Club | Games (Goals) |
| 1966–1977 | Sturt | 244 (3) |

Representative team honours
| Years | Team | Games (Goals) |
| | South Australia | 10 |
- ^{1} Playing statistics correct to the end of 19?.

Career highlights
- South Australian Football Hall of Fame inductee

Philip Nelson, commonly known as Sandy Nelson, is a former Australian rules footballer who played 244 games with Sturt in the SANFL from 1966 to 1977.

Nelson, who went by his nickname of Sandy, played in no less than seven premiership teams during his time at Sturt. He played mainly as a centre half back and represented South Australia in 10 interstate matches, including carnivals in 1969 and 1972.

His son Ben would later have a long career with Sturt, captaining the team from 2004 until 2010, playing more than 200 games and being a part of the 2002 premiership team; he also had a brief AFL career at the Carlton and Adelaide Football Clubs.

In 2004, Nelson was inducted into the South Australian Football Hall of Fame.
