= AFL pre-season draft =

Australian Football League procedure

The AFL pre-season draft is the drafting of uncontracted players to teams in the Australian Football League (AFL). The draft is conducted after the national draft and before the start of the next AFL season. It is conducted at the same time as the rookie draft. The pre-season draft is a place for any uncontracted players to nominate that missed the national draft or who were delisted after it was held.

The pre-season draft was first held in 1989, and more than 50 selections were made in each of its first five years. However, its importance has gradually diminished over the time, and pre-season drafts are now routinely cancelled due to every club opting against making a selection. It was considered that the pre-season draft only existed to protect the league from writs for restraint-of-trade, but due to the introduction of free agency in 2012, there have been calls to scrap the pre-season draft and extend the free agency period.

== Eligibility ==
Clubs receive selections in the draft based on where they finished on the AFL ladder during the year, generally in reverse order. Teams have the choice of whether to participate in the pre-season draft; many clubs fill their playing roster at the national draft, and hence do not participate in the pre-season draft. Also, unlike the national draft, picks in the pre-season drafts cannot be traded between clubs.

== Players ==
Historically, the pre-season draft has involved mostly recycled players. Until 2008, due to the standard players contract expiring at the end of November, players who did not wish to sign a new contract with their current club were forced to enter the pre-season draft if they were unable to be traded to another club during the trade week held prior to the national draft. There was no free agency in the AFL to allow uncontracted players to easily move clubs until after the 2012 season; delisted players had the option of nominating for either the national or pre-season drafts. In 2008, the rules were changed to also give uncontracted players the option of nominating for either draft. However, the number of players being selected after being delisted or coming out of contract is diminishing, as most teams are not prepared to pick them ahead of younger players.

The lack of free agency was a powerful bargaining tool during trade week, as the team with the first pick could refuse a trade for a current uncontracted player at another club, and then recruit the player that wants to join their team for free with the first pick in the pre-season draft without giving anything to the other club. Conversely, the threat of losing a player for nothing into the pre-season draft could force a team to trade him for less than the player's true value.

=== Number-one draft picks ===
A total of 27 players have been selected at pick number one in the pre-season draft. Not every pre-season draft contains a number-one pick, as clubs may choose to pass on their selection for various list management reasons. As the pre-season draft was originally held towards the end of the pre-season in January or February, the naming of the draft is based on the following season. This is different from the naming of the national draft (which occurs in November), which is named according to the season just completed.

The following is a list of number-one pre-season draft picks since the draft's inception in 1989:

Draft	Player	Selected by	Recruited from	League recruited from
1989	Brian Winton	Essendon	St Kilda	VFL
1990	David Cloke	Richmond	Collingwood	VFL
1991	Michael McLean	Brisbane	Footscray	AFL
1992	Ashley Green	Brisbane	Essendon	AFL
1993	Richard Osborne	Sydney	Fitzroy	AFL
1994	Dermott Brereton	Sydney	Hawthorn	AFL
1995	Paul Roos	Sydney	Fitzroy	AFL
1996	Brian McInnes	Fitzroy	Cairns	Cairns Australian Football League
1997	Stephen Paxman	Port Adelaide	Fitzroy	AFL
1998	Jamie Shanahan	Melbourne	St Kilda	AFL
1999	David Calthorpe	Brisbane Lions	Essendon	AFL
2000	Shane O'Bree	Collingwood	Brisbane Lions	AFL
2001	Brett Voss	St Kilda	Brisbane Lions	AFL
2002	No selection (Note: St Kilda had the number-one pick but chose to pass. The first player selected was at pick number two, where Geelong recruited Aaron Lord from Hawthorn in the AFL.)			
2003	Stephen Powell	St Kilda	Melbourne	AFL
2004	Jade Rawlings	Western Bulldogs	Hawthorn	AFL
2005	Trent Knobel	Richmond	St Kilda	AFL
2006	Dylan McLaren	Carlton	Brisbane Lions	AFL
2007	Cain Ackland	Carlton	St Kilda	AFL
2008	David Gourdis	Richmond	Subiaco	WAFL
2009	Liam Jurrah	Melbourne	Yuendumu	Central Australian Football League
2010	Joel Macdonald	Melbourne	Brisbane Lions	AFL
2011	Nathan Ablett	Gold Coast	Gold Coast	VFL
2012	No selection (Note: Greater Western Sydney had the number-one pick but chose to pass. The first player selected was at pick number seven, where Gold Coast recruited Aaron Hall from Hobart in the TSL.)			
2013	Bret Thornton	Greater Western Sydney	Carlton	AFL
2014	Jed Lamb	Greater Western Sydney	Sydney	AFL
2015	No selection (Note: Greater Western Sydney had the number-one pick but chose to pass. The first (and only) player selected was at pick number two, where Carlton recruited Jason Tutt from Western Bulldogs in the AFL.)			
2016	No selection (Note: No pre-season draft was held as all clubs declined to take part.)			
2017	No selection			
2018	Cam O'Shea	Carlton	Northern Blues	VFL
2019	No selection			
2020	Jack Martin	Carlton	Gold Coast	AFL
2021	Jackson Hately	Adelaide	Greater Western Sydney	AFL
2022	No selection (Note: North Melbourne had the number-one pick but chose to pass. The first player selected was at pick number three, where Gold Coast relisted Rory Thompson after they temporarily delisted him prior to the draft)			
2023	No selection			
2024	Chad Wingard	Hawthorn	Hawthorn	AFL
2025	Jack Gunston	Hawthorn	Hawthorn	AFL
2026	Callum Ah Chee	Adelaide	Brisbane Lions	AFL

== See also ==
- Australian Football League draft
