= Paul Corrigan (footballer) =

Australian rules footballer

Personal information
- Full name: Paul Corrigan
- Born: 30 July 1977 (age 49)
- Original team: Rythdale-Officer-Cardinia
- Draft: No. 43, 1996 National Draft
- Height: 185 cm (6 ft 1 in)
- Weight: 84 kg (185 lb)

Playing career^{1}
Years	Club	Games (Goals)
1997–2000	Geelong	53 (6)
- ^{1} Playing statistics correct to the end of 2001.

Paul Corrigan (born 30 July 1977) is a former Australian rules footballer who played with Geelong in the Australian Football League (AFL). Corrigan currently serves as the development coach at the Essendon Football Club.

== AFL career ==
Corrigan was selected by Geelong with pick 43 in the 1996 National Draft, from the Melbourne Football Club, where he had played in the reserves. He made 53 appearances for Geelong from 1997 to 2000, then didn't play a senior game in 2001, instead winning the reserves best and fairest award.

== Coaching ==
Corrigan returned to his original club, Rythdale-Officer-Cardinia, in 2002, as a playing coach, and was a member of their premiership team that year. He also played and coached at Old Haileybury. In 2013, Corrigan joined Essendon as a Development coach. Before coming to Essendon he had been a playing coach at South Barwon.
