= Andrew Bomford =

Australian rules footballer

Personal information
- Full name: Andrew Bomford
- Born: 19 July 1974 (age 52)
- Original team: North Shore
- Draft: 22nd, 1994 Pre-Season Draft
- Height: 184 cm (6 ft 0 in)
- Weight: 89 kg (196 lb)
- Position: Defender

Playing career^{1}
Years	Club	Games (Goals)
1994–1996	Sydney Swans	0 (0)
1997–1998	Essendon	13 (5)
1999–2000	Sydney Swans	15 (4)
Total		28 (9)
- ^{1} Playing statistics correct to the end of 2000.

Andrew Bomford (born 19 July 1974) is a former Australian rules footballer who played with Essendon and the Sydney Swans in the Australian Football League (AFL).

Bomford (Bomber) was initially drafted by the Sydney Swans and he played 79 games for them at reserves level. Essendon then acquired him in the 1996 AFL draft with pick 25, one of the compensation picks that they had received for losing Gavin Wanganeen. He made three appearances in 1997 and played 10 games in 1998 for Essendon.

He returned to Sydney for the 1999 season, traded for the draft pick used by Essendon on Danny Jacobs. On debut, in the opening round of the season against Port Adelaide, Bomford had a career best 25 disposals. He played only one more year with the Swans and finished his Australian career at North Shore, retiring after playing in their 2001 premiership team. He went on to play for the Wandsworth Demons in the British Australian Rules Football League, winning the club Best and Fairest in their 2003 Premiership year.
