= Matthew Clucas =

Australian rules footballer

Personal information
- Full name: Matthew Philip Clucas
- Born: 18 March 1978 (age 48)
- Height: 174 cm (5 ft 9 in)
- Weight: 78 kg (172 lb)

Playing career^{1}
| Years | Club | Games (Goals) |
| 1996–1998 & 2000 | East Fremantle | 44 (20) |
| 1997–1999 | Fremantle | 11 (1) |
| 1999 & 2001–2006 | South Fremantle | 118 (55) |
| Total | | 173 (76) |
- ^{1} Playing statistics correct to the end of 2006.

Career highlights
- 1998 WAFL Premiership with East Fremantle.; 2005 WAFL Premiership with South Fremantle.

Matthew Philip Clucas (born 18 March 1978) is an Australian rules footballer. He played as a midfielder and began his football career at East Fremantle Football Club.

== Fremantle career ==
Clucas was selected by Fremantle with the 32nd selection in the 1996 AFL draft. He played 11 Australian Football League (AFL) games between 1997 and 1999. He was delisted at the end of the 2000 season.

== WAFL career ==
Clucas played 26 games for East Fremantle, including their 1998 premiership side.

In 1999, all Fremantle listed players were allocated to play for South Fremantle in the WAFL, rather than their original WAFL team. Clucas played 19 games for South Fremantle, but returned to East Fremantle in 2000 when the single club allocation system was abolished.

After bring delisted by Fremantle at the end of the 2000 season, Clucas also left East Fremantle and rejoined South. He won their best and fairest award in 2001 and was a member of South Fremantle's 2005 premiership winning team.
