= Brad Fuller (footballer) =

Australian rules footballer, born 1978

Personal information
- Born: 8 August 1978 (age 48); Cudal, New South Wales
- Original team: Tuggeranong / Marist College Canberra / Eastlake / NSW/ACT Rams
- Debut: Round 13, 29 June 1997, Collingwood vs. Brisbane Lions, at Gabba

Playing career^{1}
Years	Club	Games (Goals)
1997–1999	Collingwood/Western Bulldogs	19 (12)
- ^{1} Playing statistics correct to the end of 1999.

Brad Fuller (born 8 August 1978) is a former Australian rules footballer, who played in the Australian Football League.

== Overview ==
Fuller made his debut in 1997 for Collingwood after being picked up late in the 1996 AFL draft, at number 87 overall.

His debut in 1997 was his only appearance for the year, but showed promise in 1998, kicking 3 goals on ANZAC Day against Essendon, yet he never returned to that form, and when Collingwood allowed younger players more of an opportunity go late in the season, Fuller was not seen as often as he would have liked, despite given a go early on in the season. He kicked 10 goals in his 12 games for the season. In his last season at Collingwood, he only played 6 games off the bench, before being delisted as Mick Malthouse took over the side. The Western Bulldogs selected Fuller with the 27th selection in the 2000 Rookie Draft, but he never managed to play a game for them after spending two seasons there.

In 2010, Brad Fuller signed with the Heywood football club in South West Victoria, along with Courtney Johns, Brad Smith and Mal Michael.
