= Jon Hassall =

Australian rules footballer

Personal information
- Full name: Jon Hassall
- Born: 14 August 1973 (age 53)
- Original team: Warrandyte
- Height: 174 cm (5 ft 9 in)
- Weight: 77 kg (170 lb)
- Position: Defender/Tagger

Playing career^{1}
Years	Club	Games (Goals)
1994–1996	Collingwood	50 (12)
1997–1999	Hawthorn	44 (5)
Total		94 (17)
- ^{1} Playing statistics correct to the end of 1999.

Career highlights
- 1994 AFL Rising Star nominee; Harry Collier Trophy 1994

Jon Hassall (born 14 August 1973) is a former Australian rules footballer who played with Collingwood and Hawthorn in the Australian Football League (AFL) during the 1990s.

A tagger, Hassall played at Collingwood mostly in the back pocket or midfield and received a 1994 AFL Rising Star nomination for his efforts against Geelong late in his debut season. He played 23 games that year, including a qualifying final and had 353 disposals. Hassall, who was originally from Warrandyte, added a further 19 games in 1995. With Collingwood having a poor season in 1996 and Hassall managing just eight games, he was let go by the club and picked up by Hawthorn in the pre-season draft.

He spent three seasons with Hawthorn and ended the 1998 AFL season well with three Brownlow Medal votes for his performance against Fremantle in the final round. Hassall was delisted a year later but kept playing football in the Essendon District Football League after a stint at the South Adelaide Football Club.

Hassall now trains thoroughbred racehorses with partner Kate Goodrich in Kilmore, Victoria.
