= Tim Hargreaves =

Australian rules footballer

Personal information
- Full name: Tim Hargreaves
- Born: 30 May 1975 (age 51)
- Original team: Berrigan
- Height: 184 cm (6 ft 0 in)
- Weight: 86 kg (190 lb)
- Position: Forward

Playing career^{1}
Years	Club	Games (Goals)
1994–1996	Hawthorn	42 (57)
1997–1998	Geelong	20 (12)
Total		62 (69)
- ^{1} Playing statistics correct to the end of 1998.

Tim Hargreaves (born 30 May 1975) is a former Australian rules footballer who played with Hawthorn and Geelong in the Australian Football League (AFL) during the 1990s.

A forward, Hargreaves came from the New South Wales town of Berrigan and kicked four goals on his AFL debut, against West Coast at Subiaco. He kicked a further six in his next three games, including another four goal haul against Brisbane, which were complemented by 21 disposals.

In 1995 he won the Mirrool silo kicking competition, made famous by Billy Brownless.

At the end of the 1996 AFL season he was traded to Geelong in a straight swap for Aaron Lord. He played a semi final at his new club in 1997 but from an individual point of view struggled to make an impact.

Hargreaves joined Yarrawonga in 1999 and was a good servant of the Ovens & Murray Football League club for the next decade. He returned to Melbourne briefly in 2000 to play reserves football for Carlton. Back at Yarrawonga, Hargreaves won the Morris Medal in 2002, as the league's "Best and Fairest" player and participated in his club's 2006 premiership.

He coached Mulwala to the Murray Football League grand final in 2010 but lost to Moama.
