= Dwayne Griffin =

Australian rules footballer

Personal information
- Full name: Dwayne Griffin
- Born: 28 February 1977 (age 49)
- Original team: Mazenod
- Draft: 89th, 1996 AFL draft
- Height: 182 cm (6 ft 0 in)
- Weight: 76 kg (168 lb)

Playing career^{1}
Years	Club	Games (Goals)
1995–2008	Swan Districts (WAFL)	106 (35)
1997	Collingwood (AFL)	1 (0)
Total		107 (35)
- ^{1} Playing statistics correct to the end of 2008.

Dwayne Griffin (born 28 February 1977) is a former Australian rules footballer who played with Collingwood in the Australian Football League (AFL). and Swan Districts in the Western Australian Football League (WAFL).

A defender, Griffin made his senior debut for Swan Districts aged eighteen in the 1995 WAFL season and was drafted at number 89 by Collingwood at the 1996 AFL draft.

Griffin played just one AFL game for Collingwood, in round 22 of the 1997 season, against North Melbourne at the Melbourne Cricket Ground (MCG), but didn't register a disposal. Delisted at the end of the season, Griffin returned to Western Australia with his original club Swan Districts and was their joint best and fairest winner in 2002.
