= Nick Stone (footballer, born 1972) =

Australian rules footballer

Personal information
- Full name: Nicholas G. Stone
- Born: 19 September 1972 (age 54)
- Original team: Claremont
- Draft: 39th, 1996 AFL draft
- Height: 187 cm (6 ft 2 in)
- Weight: 89 kg (196 lb)

Playing career^{1}
Years	Club	Games (Goals)
1997–2000	West Coast Eagles	33 (4)
- ^{1} Playing statistics correct to the end of 2000.

Nicholas G. Stone (born 19 September 1972) is a former Australian rules footballer who played with the West Coast Eagles in the Australian Football League (AFL). He was the first person to be charged under the AFL's anti-doping code with recreational drug.

Stone, who was a member of Claremont's 1996 premiership team, was already 24 when he made his AFL debut. Used primarily used as a half back by West Coast, he made 14 appearances in both of his first two seasons. He suffered from a groin injury in 1999 and played just two games, one of which was a qualifying final, making it the third year in a row he had appeared in a finals series.

After adding just three further games in 2000, Stone tested positive to amphetamine and methamphetamine towards the end of the season. Stone was de-listed by the Eagles three weeks prior to his date with the AFL Tribunal but still attended and maintained that his drink had been spiked. Despite the tribunal accepting his explanation he was still suspended for six weeks. Even if he hadn't been de-listed, he would not have missed any games because the suspension began immediately and would have been served during October and November after the season had ended. Stone would continue playing at Claremont until he retired in 2002.
