= Mark Kinnear =

Australian rules footballer

Personal information
- Full name: Mark Kinnear
- Born: 21 August 1979 (age 47)
- Original team: Calder Cannons
- Draft: 4th, 1996 National Draft
- Height: 188 cm (6 ft 2 in)
- Weight: 88 kg (194 lb)

Playing career^{1}
Years	Club	Games (Goals)
1997–1998	Sydney Swans	6 (1)
- ^{1} Playing statistics correct to the end of 1998.

Mark Kinnear (born 21 August 1979) is a former Australian rules footballer who played with the Sydney Swans in the Australian Football League (AFL).

Kinnear was selected by Sydney with the fourth pick of the 1996 National Draft, from the Calder Cannons. He played his junior football at Kilmore.

A centre half back, Kinnear was just 17 when he made his league debut. He made three appearances for the Swans in the 1997 AFL season and another three in 1998.

After the 1999 season, he was traded to Collingwood, along with a draft pick, in return for Andrew Schauble. He retired before the beginning of the 2000 AFL season.
