= Scott Freeborn =

Australian rules footballer

Personal information
- Full name: Scott Freeborn
- Born: 20 May 1978 (age 48)
- Original team: Port Adelaide (AFL)
- Height: 183 cm (6 ft 0 in)
- Weight: 90 kg (198 lb)

Playing career^{1}
Years	Club	Games (Goals)
2000–2002	Carlton	48 (17)
- ^{1} Playing statistics correct to the end of 2002.

Scott Freeborn (born 20 May 1978) is a former Australian rules footballer who played with Carlton in the Australian Football League (AFL).

Freeborn was initially listed by Port Adelaide in the 1996 AFL draft for their entry to the league in 1997, as a zone selection. A left footer, he played in the SANFL for Woodville-West Torrens but could not break into the AFL until getting a second chance when he was rookie listed by Carlton.

In 2000, Freeborn played 18 AFL games, three of them finals. He was again a regular member of the team in 2001, mostly as a defender, putting together 23 appearances and missing just one game all year. Freeborn, the brother of North Melbourne premiership player Glenn, suffered from an Achilles tendon injury and broken collar bone in 2002 which limited him to six games. He did not play at all in 2003 due to a foot injury and osteitis pubis, giving the club little option but to delist him at the end of the season.
