= Hamish Simpson =

Australian rules footballer

Personal information
- Full name: Hamish Crampton Simpson
- Born: 17 January 1976 (age 50)
- Original team: Woodville-West Torrens (SANFL)
- Height: 191 cm (6 ft 3 in)
- Weight: 90 kg (198 lb)

Playing career^{1}
Years	Club	Games (Goals)
1998–2000	Geelong	18 (0)
- ^{1} Playing statistics correct to the end of 2000.

Hamish Crampton Simpson (born 17 January 1976) is a former Australian rules footballer who played with Geelong in the Australian Football League (AFL).

Simpson, a defender, is from Queensland originally, playing his early football at Kedron Grange. The next part of his career was spent in South Australia, where he played for South Australian National Football League (SANFL) club Woodville-West Torrens.

Simpson came to Geelong via the 1996 AFL draft and made his first appearances in the 1998 AFL season. After eight games that year, Simpson played another nine in 1999, including each of the last eight rounds. In 2000 he played just one senior game and was delisted at the end of the year.
