= Brett Evans (Australian footballer) =

Australian rules footballer

Personal information
- Full name: Brett Evans
- Born: 26 May 1972 (age 54)
- Original team: Narre Warren
- Draft: No. 6, 1997 Pre-Season Draft
- Height: 186 cm (6 ft 1 in)
- Weight: 85 kg (187 lb)

Playing career^{1}
Years	Club	Games (Goals)
1997–2000	Richmond	28 (26)
- ^{1} Playing statistics correct to the end of 2000.

Brett "The Birdman" Evans (born 26 May 1972) is a former Australian rules footballer who played with Richmond in the Australian Football League (AFL).

Evans, a forward, played for Narre Warren and Springvale, before being picked up by Melbourne in the 1993 Mid-Season Draft. He was a member of Melbourne's 1993 reserves premiership team but didn't play a senior league game and ended up returning to Springvale.

Richmond offered him a second chance when they secured him at pick six in the 1997 Pre-Season Draft. He made 28 appearances for Richmond over four seasons, all but four of them in 1998 and 1999.

He finished his career back at Narre Warren, where he played in five Mornington Peninsula premierships.
