= Jason Baldwin (footballer) =

Australian rules footballer

Personal information
- Full name: Jason Baldwin
- Born: 7 November 1969 (age 56)
- Original team: Coldstream
- Height: 180 cm (5 ft 11 in)
- Weight: 78 kg (172 lb)

Playing career^{1}
Years	Club	Games (Goals)
1989–1996	Fitzroy	125 (36)
1997	Richmond	2 (0)
Total		127 (36)
- ^{1} Playing statistics correct to the end of 1997.

Jason Baldwin (born 7 November 1969) is a former Australian rules footballer who played with Fitzroy and Richmond in the Australian Football League (AFL).

Baldwin, a recruit from Coldstream, was a regular fixture in the Fitzroy team throughout the 1990s but managed just two games at Richmond, which secured him at pick 63 in the 1996 National Draft.

He now works for a scaffolding business in Dandenong.
