= Tom Gilligan (footballer, born 1978) =

Australian rules footballer

Personal information
- Full name: Tom Gilligan
- Born: 3 November 1978 (age 48)
- Original teams: Frankston Bombers / Dandenong Stingrays
- Draft: No. 13, 1996 National Draft (Adelaide)
- Height: 198 cm (6 ft 6 in)
- Weight: 96 kg (212 lb)
- Position: Ruckman

Playing career^{1}
Years	Club	Games (Goals)
1997	Adelaide	3 (0)
- ^{1} Playing statistics correct to the end of 1997.

Thomas Gilligan (born 3 November 1978) is an Australian rules footballer who played for Adelaide Football Club in the Australian Football League.

Gilligan played as a young ruckman in 1997 for the Crows, being treated to a baptism of fire in his three games. He would remain a backup to lead ruckman Shaun Rehn. Gilligan did not play any AFL games in 1998 for the Crows and was delisted.

Gilligan played for St Mary's Football Club in the Geelong Football League, winning premierships in 2004 and 2008. He was named at 33 in the top 50 Geelong Football League players of all time.
