= Daniel Donati =

Australian rules footballer

Personal information
- Full name: Daniel Donati
- Born: 29 September 1977 (age 49)
- Original team: Old Xaverians
- Draft: 79th, 1996 AFL draft
- Height: 187 cm (6 ft 2 in)
- Weight: 83 kg (183 lb)

Playing career^{1}
| Years | Club | Games (Goals) |
| 1997 | Richmond | 1 (0) |
- ^{1} Playing statistics correct to the end of 1997.

Daniel Donati (born 29 September 1977) is a former Australian rules footballer who played with Richmond in the Australian Football League (AFL).

Donati was recruited from Old Xaverians in the Victorian Amateur Football Association, with the 79th selection of the 1996 AFL draft, after playing in the Xavs' Under 19s and Senior premierships that year. He spent two years on the Richmond senior list, and was picked for the seniors by coach Robert Walls just once, he played in Richmond's loss to the Brisbane Lions at the Gabba and had three disposals. He played in Richmond's 1997 reserves premiership, and was delisted at the end of 1998.

He won a Norm Goss Memorial Medal in 1999 when he starred on the wing for Springvale in the Victorian Football League grand final.

In 2010, Donati spent a season with Geelong Football League club Lara and then announced his retirement at the end of the year. Before that he had played over 100 games for Noble Park in the Eastern Football League. He is now coach of Barwon Heads in the Bellarine Football League.
