= Kent Kingsley =

Australian rules footballer (born 1978)

Personal information
- Full name: Kent Kingsley
- Born: 26 September 1978 (age 48)
- Original team: Woodville-West Torrens (SANFL)
- Height: 193 cm (6 ft 4 in)
- Weight: 95 kg (209 lb)
- Position: Full-forward

Playing career^{1}
Years	Club	Games (Goals)
1999–2000	North Melbourne	12 (10)
2001–2006	Geelong	110 (227)
2007	Richmond	3 (2)
Total		125 (239)
- ^{1} Playing statistics correct to the end of 2007.

Career highlights
- Geelong Leading goalkicker 2002, 2003, 2004, 2005

Kent Kingsley (born 26 September 1978) is a former Australian rules footballer for the North Melbourne Football Club, the Geelong Football Club and the Richmond Football Club in the Australian Football League (AFL).

== Career ==
A full-forward, Kingsley was recruited from South Australian National Football League (SANFL) club Woodville-West Torrens along with his twin brother Wade by Port Adelaide, but the brothers were quickly traded to North Melbourne for Paul Geister in 1996. Elevated as a rookie in 1999 AFL season, he made his AFL debut in round 10 that season and kicked six goals against Port Adelaide.

Kingsley was traded to Geelong at the end of the 2000 AFL season. Kent's eight-year AFL career saw him play 125 games for three clubs.

During his time with Geelong, Kingsley became the side's leading goalkicker from 2002 to 2005 and was a key option up forward. However, he was often maligned by fans for his inconsistency and inaccuracy in front of goal - although he ultimately was a valuable player for Geelong during that time - leading the Coleman medal at various early stages in 2002 and finishing that season with a respectable 57 goals (just 17 behind eventual winner David Neitz).

During 2006, Kingsley was dropped from the side midway through the season despite the Cats' lack of other forward options. At the season's end, Kingsley joined the Richmond Football Club via the 2006 Draft.

He played only three senior games in 2007 for Richmond, and he announced his retirement from AFL football on 28 August 2007.

== Personal life ==
In 1998, Kingsley started his first company (IT web development and database integration) that was bought out by a public software company in 1999. The same year, Kingsley made his AFL debut playing for North Melbourne at the age of 21.

Off the field, Kingsley has worked as an internet entrepreneur and co-owned a Geelong-based restaurant with fellow Geelong footballers Steven King and Matthew Scarlett called the George and Dragon Hotel from 2004 to 2007, until it changed name and ownership due to financial difficulty.

Kent is currently playing for Glen Orden in the Western Region Football League.
