= Shannon Corcoran =

Australian rules footballer

Personal information
- Full name: Shannon Corcoran
- Born: 22 February 1971 (age 55)
- Original team: Glenelg (SANFL)
- Draft: No. 49, 1988 national draft
- Height: 182 cm (6 ft 0 in)
- Weight: 80 kg (176 lb)

Playing career^{1}
Years	Club	Games (Goals)
1990–1994	Footscray	23 (2)
1995–1996	Brisbane Bears	5 (0)
1997	Sydney	2 (0)
Total		30 (2)
- ^{1} Playing statistics correct to the end of 1997.

Shannon Corcoran (born 22 February 1971) is a former Australian rules footballer who played with Footscray, the Brisbane Bears and Sydney in the Australian Football League (AFL) during the 1990s.

He attended Westbourne Grammar School during his schooling years.

Picked with the 49th selection of the 1988 VFL draft, Corcoran spent six seasons at Footscray but could only manage 23 AFL games. He did however play all three of their finals in 1992, including the semi-final win over St Kilda when he had 16 disposals.

Corcoran was let go by Footscray after the 1994 season and secured by Brisbane in the pre-season draft. At his new club he again struggled to play regular senior football due to injuries and was delisted, only to be given another opportunity when Sydney selected him with the 34th pick of the 1996 AFL draft.
