= Tim Cook (footballer) =

Australian rules footballer, born 1974

Personal information
- Full name: Timothy Cook
- Born: 20 February 1974 (age 52)
- Original team: Central District
- Height: 176 cm (5 ft 9 in)
- Weight: 75 kg (165 lb)

Playing career^{1}
Years	Club	Games (Goals)
1997–1998	Adelaide	8 (5)
- ^{1} Playing statistics correct to the end of 1998.

Timothy Cook (born 20 February 1974) is a former Australian rules footballer who played for Adelaide in the Australian Football League (AFL).

== Early life ==
Tim Cook started playing football at North Clare in the North Eastern Football League he was part of five junior colts flags in a row. He then played a full A Grade season at 15 years of age in 1989. Cook then went to Rostrevor College for two years. He played in the South Australian Teal Cup, impressing to be selected for an Australian tour in Ireland. He was also in the South Australian Under 17 cricket team as a left arm orthodox spinner and middle-order batsman. Cook made his SANFL debut for Central District at 17.

== Career ==
In 1996 Cook played his first SANFL state game and was selected on the original Port Adelaide Football Club list. However Cook was traded alongside Aaron Keating for Scott Hodges. Cook made his debut for the Crows in round 2 of 1997 against Richmond, the game was most notable for coach Malcolm Blight claiming ruckman David Pittman as pathetic. Cook played a majority of 1997 for Centrals, only playing 4 games for the Crows. This would also be the case in 1998 and Cook was delisted.

Cook continued to play for Centrals until 2000 when he missed out on premiership success, he played 117 games and kicking 138 goals. At 26 he then went to North Adelaide and won their best and fairest. Cook finished for North Adelaide in 2005 playing 89 games and kicking 31 goals for the Roosters.
