= Daniel McAlister =

Australian rules footballer

Personal information
- Full name: Daniel McAlister
- Born: 22 August 1978 (age 48); New Zealand
- Original team: Tassie Mariners
- Height: 185 cm (6 ft 1 in)
- Weight: 88 kg (194 lb)

Playing career^{1}
Years	Club	Games (Goals)
1997, 2001–02	Essendon	6 (0)
- ^{1} Playing statistics correct to the end of 2002.

Daniel McAlister (born 22 August 1978 in New Zealand) is an Australian rules footballer who played six games in the Australian Football League for the Essendon Football Club.

McAlister was born in New Zealand, of Māori heritage. He is one of the few Maori Australians in the history of the VFL/AFL. McAlister grew up playing rugby union and rugby league as a junior in Taranaki. His family emigrated to Tasmania when Daniel was 12, and after starting as a boundary umpire he played junior Australian rules in Smithton before moving to Hobart where he was selected in the Under 18 state team.

McAlister, who is 185 centimetres (6 ft 1 in) tall and weighs 88 kilograms (194 lb), played six games in three seasons between 1997 and 2002. Originally drafted with pick 5 in the 1996 AFL Draft, McAlister was delisted after playing just two senior games. Surprisingly, he was re-drafted in the 2001 AFL draft, picked up again by Essendon at pick #64. He was delisted at the end of 2002, after which he was signed to play for the Wodonga Raiders in country Victoria.

In 2023, McAlister was hired to coach Thurgoona Football Club.
