= Josh Wooden =

Australian rules footballer

Personal information
- Full name: Joshua Mark Wooden
- Nickname: Pinocchio
- Born: 14 November 1978 (age 47)
- Original team: Lockhart / NSW-ACT U18
- Draft: 24th 1996 AFL draft
- Height: 183 cm (6 ft 0 in)
- Weight: 83 kg (183 lb)

Playing career^{1}
Years	Club	Games (Goals)
1997–2007	West Coast Eagles	96 (18)
1997–1998	Subiaco	12 (?)
1999	Claremont	13 (2)
2000–2001	East Perth	14 (6)
2002–2007	Subiaco	46 (18)
- ^{1} Playing statistics correct to the end of 2007.

Josh Wooden (born 14 November 1978) is a former Australian rules footballer in the Australian Football League.

He was recruited as the number 24 draft pick in the 1996 AFL draft from Lockhart. Wooden made his debut for the West Coast Eagles in Round 1, 1997 against the Sydney Swans.

While playing in the West Australian Football League he played in three premierships, in 2000 for East Perth and in 2004 and 2006 for Subiaco.

He retired from football in 2007 at the age of 28, due to a nagging hip problem.
