= Paul Evans (Australian footballer) =

Australian rules footballer

Personal information
- Full name: Paul T. Evans
- Born: 29 December 1978 (age 47)
- Original team: Port Adelaide (SANFL)
- Height: 187 cm (6 ft 2 in)
- Weight: 88 kg (194 lb)
- Position: Forward

Playing career^{1}
Years	Club	Games (Goals)
1998	Port Adelaide	6 (5)
- ^{1} Playing statistics correct to the end of 1998.

Paul Evans (born 29 December 1978) is a former Australian rules footballer who played with Port Adelaide in the Australian Football League (AFL) and South Australian National Football League (SANFL).

Evans played in Port Adelaide's SANFL junior teams and was a member of the South Australian team that won the Teal Cup in 1995, kicking eight goals in the final against Vic Metro.

Evans was selected by Port Adelaide's AFL team as a zonal selection in the 1996 AFL draft, forming their inaugural AFL squad for the 1997 season, but did not make any appearances that year.

Evans made his senior AFL debut in 1998, playing six matches. He kicked two goals and four behinds on his league debut, against Fremantle at Football Park.

The following year Evans didn't appear in any AFL games but was full-forward in Port Adelaide's 1999 SANFL premiership and topped the club's goal-kicking that year.

At the end of the 2000 AFL season, without adding any more games to his tally, Evans was delisted by Port Adelaide.

In 2001, Evans joined Robinvale in the Sunraysia Football League, as playing coach. He was the league's leading goal-kicker in the 2001 season, with 119 goals.

After another season with Robinvale in 2002, Evans returned to the SANFL and continued his career at Port Adelaide. He topped Port's goal-kicking in 2003 and 2004.

Paul now runs his family's oyster farm in Streaky Bay, South Australia.
