= Matthew Banks (footballer) =

Australian rules footballer

Personal information
- Full name: Matthew Banks
- Born: 20 July 1976 (age 50)
- Original team: Ringwood / Eastern Ranges
- Height: 199 cm (6 ft 6 in)
- Weight: 103 kg (227 lb)
- Position: Fullback

Playing career^{1}
| Years | Club | Games (Goals) |
| 1997–1998 | Essendon | 3 (1) |
- ^{1} Playing statistics correct to the end of 1998.

Matthew Banks (born 20 July 1976) is a former Australian rules footballer who played with Essendon in the Australian Football League (AFL).

Banks was initially drafted in 1995 but soon lost his place on the senior list, before returning to the list after a strong season in the reserves.

He has the distinction of playing in two Anzac Day clashes, despite playing only three senior games for Essendon. He made his league debut in the 1997 Anzac Day fixture and played on Collingwood full-forward Saverio Rocca. Two weeks later he was again the Essendon full-back, chosen to play on Adelaide star Tony Modra. His first and final league games was another Anzac Day match in 1998 when he injured his shoulder.
