= Sam Smart =

Australian rules footballer

Personal information
- Born: 1 May 1975 (age 51)
- Original team: Norwood (SANFL)
- Height: 200 cm (6 ft 7 in)
- Weight: 101 kg (223 lb)

Playing career^{1}
Years	Club	Games (Goals)
1997	Carlton	1 (0)
- ^{1} Playing statistics correct to the end of 1997.

Sam Smart (born 2 May 1975) is a former professional Australian rules footballer who played with Carlton in the Australian Football League (AFL).

Originally from South Australian National Football League (SANFL) club Norwood, Smart was drafted by Adelaide at the 1992 AFL draft but didn't play a game and was subsequently drafted by Carlton in 1994 AFL draft however remained in South Australia to complete his medical studies, moving to Victoria at the end of the 1995 AFL season.

Smart played one game for Carlton in 1997 and was delisted by Carlton at the end of the 1998 AFL season. Smart then played for North Ballarat in the Victorian Football League (VFL).
