= Trent Ormond-Allen =

Australian rules footballer

Personal information
- Full name: Trent Ormond-Allen
- Born: 11 June 1976 (age 50)
- Original team: Port Adelaide (SANFL)
- Draft: 10th, 1993 AFL draft
- Height: 180 cm (5 ft 11 in)
- Weight: 82 kg (181 lb)

Playing career^{1}
Years	Club	Games (Goals)
1994–1996	Melbourne	8 (1)
1997–1999	Adelaide	42 (2)
1997–2001	Port Adelaide (SANFL)	44 (27)
Total		94 (30)
- ^{1} Playing statistics correct to the end of 1999.

Trent Ormond-Allen (born 11 June 1976) is a former Australian rules footballer who played with Melbourne and Adelaide in the Australian Football League (AFL) during the 1990s.

Melbourne secured Ormond-Allen with the tenth pick of the 1993 AFL draft, from South Australian National Football League (SANFL) club Port Adelaide. A half-back, he broke into the seniors just once in 1995 and after playing just seven further games in 1996 was traded to Adelaide for pick 83 in the draft, Ashley Gehling.

Ormond-Allen played 18 AFL games in 1997, including a semifinal and preliminary final but missed the Grand Final due to glandular fever. Adelaide made another grand final in 1998 and Ormond-Allen, despite making 15 appearances in the home and away season, once again missed out on selection. He was de-listed at the end of 2000, after not playing a senior game all season.

Trent was aligned to the Port Adelaide Magpies in the SANFL when not playing AFL and won an SANFL premiership with Port Adelaide in 1998.
