= Mark Harwood =

Australian rules footballer

Personal information
- Full name: Mark Harwood
- Born: 8 April 1978 (age 48)
- Original team: Tassie Mariners
- Draft: 9th, 1996 National Draft
- Height: 188 cm (6 ft 2 in)
- Weight: 90 kg (198 lb)
- Position: Forward

Playing career^{1}
Years	Club	Games (Goals)
1998–2001	Port Adelaide	30 (19)
- ^{1} Playing statistics correct to the end of 2001.

Mark Harwood (born 8 April 1978) is a former Australian rules footballer who played with Port Adelaide in the Australian Football League (AFL).

Harwood was the third player selected by Port Adelaide in the 1996 National Draft and ninth overall. The Tasmanian recruit didn't feature at all in the 1997 AFL season, but played six games in 1998, 13 in 1999, nine in 2000 and two games in 2001 as injuries curtailed his career.

In the South Australian National Football League (SANFL), Harwood played for three clubs during his career; South Adelaide, Glenelg and the Port Adelaide Magpies.
