= Mark Chaffey =

Australian rules footballer

Personal information
- Born: 6 May 1977 (age 49)
- Original team: Caulfield Grammar
- Debut: Round 4, 19 April 1997, Richmond vs. Fremantle, at Princes Park
- Height: 178 cm (5 ft 10 in)
- Weight: 82 kg (181 lb)
- Position: Defender

Playing career^{1}
Years	Club	Games (Goals)
1997–2006	Richmond	166 (34)
- ^{1} Playing statistics correct to the end of 2006.

Mark Chaffey (born 6 May 1977) is a former Australian rules football player who played in the AFL between 1997 and 2006 for the Richmond Football Club.

== See also ==
- List of Caulfield Grammar School people
