= Andrew Balkwill =

Australian rules footballer

Personal information
- Full name: Andrew Balkwill
- Born: 24 March 1972 (age 54)
- Original team: Central District (SANFL)
- Height: 192 cm (6 ft 4 in)
- Weight: 89 kg (196 lb)
- Position: Half forward

Playing career^{1}
Years	Club	Games (Goals)
1997–1998	Carlton	1 (0)
- ^{1} Playing statistics correct to the end of 1998.

Andrew Balkwill (born 24 March 1972) is a former Australian rules footballer who played for the Carlton Football Club in the Australian Football League (AFL).

Originally with South Australian National Football League (SANFL) club Central District, Balkwill and Ben Nelson were traded to Carlton for Brent Heaver at the end of the 1996 season.

Balkwill played his sole game for Carlton in Round 3, 1997 – the game best remembered for Carlton wearing sky blue guernseys as part of a cross-promotion for the new blue-coloured M&M's. Balkwill never played a senior game in the club's traditional navy blue – which was a unique distinction until Carlton introduced clash guernseys.

He was formerly the Principal of Thomas More College Salisbury, but is now the Principal of Mercedes College Adelaide beginning in 2020.
