= Matthew Bishop (footballer) =

Australian rules footballer

Personal information
- Born: 11 July 1975 (age 51)
- Original team: Box Hill (VFL)
- Debut: Round 5, 26 April 1998, Melbourne vs. Port Adelaide, at the MCG

Playing career^{1}
Years	Club	Games (Goals)
1998–1999	Melbourne	18 (4)
2000–2006	Port Adelaide	132 (4)
Total		150 (8)
- ^{1} Playing statistics correct to the end of 2006.

Career highlights
- Port Adelaide premiership side 2004

Matthew Bishop (born 11 July 1975) is a former Australian rules footballer who played in the Australian Football League (AFL).

Bishop started out with the Melbourne Demons after being elevated from their rookie list in 1998. He spent two seasons with them before moving to Port Adelaide in 2000, where he made a name for himself as one of the most solid defenders at the club. He played in Port Adelaide's 2004 premiership team.

== Playing statistics ==
Legend
G	Goals	K	Kicks	D	Disposals	T	Tackles
B	Behinds	H	Handballs	M	Marks

Season	Team	No.	Games	Totals							Averages (per game)						
Season	Team	No.	Games	G	B	K	H	D	M	T	G	B	K	H	D	M	T
1998	Melbourne	48	10	3	2	54	30	84	24	4	0.3	0.2	5.4	3.0	8.4	2.4	0.4
1999	Melbourne	18	8	1	1	47	16	63	19	2	0.1	0.1	5.9	2.0	7.9	2.4	0.3
2000	Port Adelaide	4	14	0	2	83	44	127	31	8	0.0	0.1	5.9	3.1	9.1	2.2	0.6
2001	Port Adelaide	19	11	0	0	61	21	82	35	12	0.0	0.0	5.5	1.9	7.5	3.2	1.1
2002	Port Adelaide	19	25	2	3	212	72	284	118	19	0.1	0.1	8.5	2.9	11.4	4.7	0.8
2003	Port Adelaide	19	22	0	1	160	74	234	112	17	0.0	0.0	7.3	3.4	10.6	5.1	0.8
2004	Port Adelaide	19	24	0	0	172	105	277	109	27	0.0	0.0	7.2	4.4	11.5	4.5	1.1
2005	Port Adelaide	19	20	2	0	142	77	219	92	10	0.1	0.0	7.1	3.9	11.0	4.6	0.5
2006	Port Adelaide	19	16	0	0	101	59	160	59	11	0.0	0.0	6.3	3.7	10.0	3.7	0.7
Career			150	8	9	1032	498	1530	599	110	0.1	0.1	6.9	3.3	10.2	4.0	0.7
