= Nigel Fiegert =

Australian rules footballer

Personal information
- Full name: Nigel Fiegert
- Born: 28 January 1976 (age 50)
- Original team: Port Adelaide (SANFL)
- Draft: Zone Selection, 1996 AFL draft
- Height: 191 cm (6 ft 3 in)
- Weight: 95 kg (209 lb)

Playing career^{1}
Years	Club	Games (Goals)
1997–1999	Port Adelaide	19 (6)
- ^{1} Playing statistics correct to the end of 1999.

Career highlights
- SANFL premiership player: 1996, 1998, 1999

Nigel Fiegert (born 28 January 1976) is a former Australian rules footballer who played with Port Adelaide in the Australian Football League (AFL).

A defender, Fiegert was a foundation player for Port Adelaide, signed up as one of their zone selections in the 1996 AFL draft. He missed selection for Port Adelaide's round one fixture but made his debut the following week in their first ever game at Football Park, against Essendon. Not selected for the next nine weeks, Fiegert kicked three goals on his return, playing as a forward against the Western Bulldogs. He played just two more games that year and the following year only appeared in the first half of the season. After playing in the opening five rounds of the 1999 AFL season, Fiegert wasn't picked again and was delisted at the end of the year. Fiegert won 3 premiership for Port Adelaide in the SANFL in 1996, 1998 and 1999.

Fiegert won a Mail Medal in 2005, while playing for Lucindale in the Kowree-Naracoorte-Tatiara Football League.
