= Cameron Roberts =

Australian rules footballer (born 1978)

Personal information
- Full name: Cameron Roberts
- Born: 7 September 1978 (age 48)
- Original team: North Adelaide
- Height: 194 cm (6 ft 4 in)
- Weight: 92 kg (203 lb)

Playing career^{1}
Years	Club	Games (Goals)
1997–1998	Geelong	11 (2)
- ^{1} Playing statistics correct to the end of 1998.

Cameron Roberts (born 7 September 1978) is a former Australian rules footballer who played with Geelong in the Australian Football League (AFL).

A key position player, Roberts came to Geelong from North Adelaide. Roberts played three senior AFL games in 1997 and eight in the 1998 season. He returned to North Adelaide after leaving Geelong and in 2002 crossed to Sturt. He also spent some time in the Northern Territory, playing for Southern Districts.
