= John Stevens (footballer) =

Australian rules footballer

Personal information
- Full name: John Stevens
- Born: 15 June 1971 (age 55)
- Original team: Old Ivanhoe Grammarians
- Height: 187 cm (6 ft 2 in)
- Weight: 83 kg (183 lb)

Playing career^{1}
Years	Club	Games (Goals)
1997–2001	Sydney Swans	78 (45)
- ^{1} Playing statistics correct to the end of 2001.

John Stevens (born 15 June 1971) is a former Australian rules footballer who played with the Sydney Swans in the Australian Football League (AFL).

Stevens played some football for the Collingwood Under-19s but his initial AFL ambitions were thwarted by a knee injury and having to have heart surgery. He was later drafted by Sydney as a mature age recruit, from Old Ivanhoe Grammarians. When he made his league debut in the 1997 AFL season, Stevens was already 25.

A left footer, he was used mostly on the wing by Sydney and didn't miss a single game in 1998. Stevens, who played finals football in each of his first three seasons, put his name in the record books in 1999 when he took 20 marks against Melbourne at the MCG which was at the time the second most number of marks ever records in a VFL/AFL game.

In an interview on Melbourne sports radio station: 1116 SEN, Stevens went into details about his tachycardia; explaining that his condition was made known when a coach confronted him for laziness as result to his lack of second efforts. Throughout his career (some accounts suggest Steven had heart surgery before joining Sydney), after a burst of activity, Stevens would double over and breathe heavily in an attempt to consciously bring his heart rate down to regular levels from as high as 350 beats per minute. Ignoring medical advice to discontinue his career, he played senior AFL with his condition until 2001.
