= Bowen Lockwood =

Australian rules footballer

Personal information
- Born: 1 July 1978 (age 48)
- Original team: Geelong U18
- Debut: Round 2, 6 April 1997, Port Adelaide vs. Essendon, at Football Park
- Height: 194 cm (6 ft 4 in)
- Weight: 91 kg (201 lb)

Playing career^{1}
Years	Club	Games (Goals)
1997–2001	Port Adelaide	50 (45)
- ^{1} Playing statistics correct to the end of 2001.

Career highlights
- AFL Rising Star nominee: 1997

Bowen Lockwood (born 1 July 1978) is a former Australian rules footballer in the Australian Football League.

Originally from Mount Eliza, Lockwood attended Geelong College and was recruited from Geelong U18 in the 1996 AFL draft at pick number 7.

== AFL career ==
Touted as a possible key forward for Port Adelaide, Lockwood earned a Rising Star nomination in 1997, his debut year.

After a training incident in 1999 where Lockwood picked up a ball and was crashed into by a teammate, he had continual problems with a bulging disc injury. He played only six games in 1999 and ten in 2000.

He continued to struggle, playing four games in 2001. In 2002 he remained on Port's list but announced his retirement that season at only 24 due to chronic injury.
