= Ian Downsborough =

Australian rules footballer, born 1972

Personal information
- Full name: Ian James Downsborough
- Born: 19 January 1972 (age 54)
- Original team: West Perth (WAFL)
- Height: 192 cm (6 ft 4 in)
- Weight: 94 kg (207 lb)

Playing career^{1}
Years	Club	Games (Goals)
1995–1996	West Coast	20 (5)
1997	Port Adelaide	7 (2)
1998–1999	Adelaide	12 (6)
Total		39 (13)
- ^{1} Playing statistics correct to the end of 1999.

Ian James Downsborough (born 19 January 1972) is a former Australian rules footballer who played in the Australian Football League.

== Early life ==
Downsborough grew up in Burracoppin, Western Australia on a sheep and wheat farm. He went to primary school in Burracoppin and high school in nearby Merredin, graduating in 1989 Ian then worked on the family farm and played for Burracoppin Cats in the Eastern Districts Football League until 1993 when he went to play for West Perth Football Club.

== Career ==
After two seasons with West Perth he was drafted by West Coast at pick 54 in the 1994 AFL draft. He played one game for the Eagles in 1995 but won the WAFL Grand Final with West Perth.

=== West Coast ===
1996 was a successful season for Downsborough, he played as an undersized ruckman replacing Ryan Turnbull. He played 19 games including the Eagles qualifying final vs Carlton but he was dropped for the semi-final.

At the end of 1996 Downsborough was signed by the incoming Port Adelaide as a free agent. West Coast also traded Shane Bond and Brayden Lyle to the Power to ensure the Eagles could get the #1 pick in the 1996 AFL draft as compensation for losing Downsborough. West Coast received #1 (Michael Gardiner) and #24 (Josh Wooden).

=== Port Adelaide ===
Illness virtually wiped out his 1997 season, only playing 7 games for the Power, after this Port Adelaide traded him to the Adelaide Football Club for Brett Chalmers.

=== Adelaide ===
Downsborough remained a backup option for the Crows in 1998 missing out on playing in their Grand Final win. In 1999 he mostly played with Norwood once again and was delisted. He played 30 games and kicked 21 goals from 1997 to 1999 for Norwood.

Ian went back to Western Australia and played 2000 with West Perth only managing 6 games. He then returned to Burracoppin, playing and coaching for the Cats.
