= Stephen Daniels (Australian footballer) =

Australian rules footballer (born 1976)

Personal information
- Full name: Stephen M. Daniels
- Born: 3 September 1976 (age 50)
- Height: 193 cm (6 ft 4 in)
- Weight: 90 kg (198 lb)
- Position: Defender

Playing career^{1}
Years	Club	Games (Goals)
1994–2004	Norwood (SANFL)	131
1997–2000	Port Adelaide (AFL)	58 (2)
- ^{1} Playing statistics correct to the end of 2000.

Stephen Daniels (born 3 September 1976) is a former Australian rules footballer who played with Port Adelaide in the Australian Football League (AFL).

Daniels, a defender, was part of Port Adelaide's inaugural squad in 1997, after being picked up by the club as a zone selection, from Norwood. In 1999 he played 20 games, one of which was Port Adelaide's qualifying final loss to the Kangaroos.
