= Nathan Steinberner =

Australian rules footballer

Personal information
- Full name: Nathan Steinberner
- Born: 11 March 1977 (age 49)
- Original team: Tanunda
- Height: 176 cm (5 ft 9 in)
- Weight: 86 kg (190 lb)

Playing career^{1}
Years	Club	Games (Goals)
1997–2008	Central District	141
1997–2001	Port Adelaide	20 (3)
- ^{1} Playing statistics correct to the end of 2001.

Nathan Steinberner (born 11 March 1977) is a former Australian rules footballer who played with Port Adelaide in the Australian Football League (AFL).

Steinberner, originally from Tanunda, in the Barossa Valley, was picked up by Port Adelaide from the Central District Football Club, as a zone selection. An on-baller, he played just once in their inaugural league season and also played only one game in 1998. He made 11 appearances in 1999, most in the second half of the season. Over the next two years he added just seven more games to his tally.

He was a member of five premiership teams at Central District, in 2000, 2001, 2003, 2004, 2005. In the 2004 SANFL Grand Final, Steinberner won the Jack Oatey Medal, awarded to the best on ground. He was club captain in 2006, but missed most of the year with injury, including the grand final loss to Woodville-West Torrens.
