= Tom Carr (footballer) =

Australian rules footballer

Personal information
- Born: 16 June 1978 (age 48)
- Original team: Port Adelaide Magpies (SANFL)
- Height: 183 cm (6 ft 0 in)
- Weight: 77 kg (170 lb)

Playing career^{1}
Years	Club	Games (Goals)
1997–1999	Port Adelaide (AFL)	5 (0)
1997-2002 & 2005-2008	Port Adelaide Magpies (SANFL)	158 (19)
Total		163 (19)
- ^{1} Playing statistics correct to the end of 1999–2008.

Career highlights
- SANFL premiership player (1998, 1999); SANFL deputy vice-captain 2002

Tom Carr (born 16 June 1978) is a retired Australian rules footballer who played for Port Adelaide Football Club in the Australian Football League (AFL) and the Port Adelaide Magpies in the South Australian National Football League (SANFL).

Initially from Cummins Kapinnie Football Club on the Eyre Peninsula of South Australia, Carr played for Port Adelaide in the SANFL before his selection as a zone recruitment by Port Adelaide when they entered the AFL. Carr played five AFL games for Port Adelaide in an injury-interrupted career before being delisted at the end of the 1999 AFL season. He then continued to play for Port Adelaide in the SANFL, serving as deputy vice-captain in 2002, before spending two years travelling overseas. Carr returned to Port Adelaide in 2005 and played until 2008.
