= Paul Geister =

Australian rules footballer

Personal information
- Full name: Paul Geister
- Born: 29 January 1972 (age 54)
- Original team: Central District (SANFL)
- Draft: 24th, 1993 Pre-Season draft
- Height: 191 cm (6 ft 3 in)
- Weight: 93 kg (205 lb)

Playing career^{1}
Years	Club	Games (Goals)
1994–1996	North Melbourne	3 (0)
1997	Port Adelaide	1 (0)
Total		4 (0)
- ^{1} Playing statistics correct to the end of 1997.

Paul Geister (born 29 January 1972) is a former Australian rules footballer who played with North Melbourne and Port Adelaide in the Australian Football League (AFL).

Recruited from South Australian National Football League (SANFL) club Central District at the 1993 AFL pre-season draft, Geister spent his time at North Melbourne as an understudy to full-back Mick Martyn.

Geister made his senior AFL debut in the final round of the 1995 AFL season and then appeared in two finals, a qualifying final win over Richmond and a semi final against the West Coast Eagles.

After playing reserves for the entire 1996 AFL season as North Melbourne won the premiership, Geister was traded to Port Adelaide for the Kingsley brothers, Kent and Wade, but played just one senior game at his new club. Geister however had success at Central District and was the full-back in their 2000 and 2001 premierships.
