= Aaron Keating =

Australian rules footballer (born 1974)

Personal information
- Full name: Aaron Keating
- Born: 24 May 1974 (age 52)
- Original team: Norwood (SANFL)/Surfers Paradise(QLD)
- Height: 202 cm (6 ft 8 in)
- Weight: 106 kg (234 lb)
- Position: Ruckman

Playing career^{1}
Years	Club	Games (Goals)
1997–1998	Adelaide	6 (1)
- ^{1} Playing statistics correct to the end of 1999.

Career highlights
- AFL Premiership player (1997); SANFL Premiership player (1997)

Aaron Keating (born 24 May 1974) is a former Australian rules footballer who played in the Australian Football League (AFL) and the South Australian National Football League (SANFL). His six-game AFL career included the 1997 premiership.

Originally from Surfers Paradise Football Club, he moved to the SANFL, playing six senior games for South Adelaide during 1994-1995 and 46 games for Norwood during 1996–2000.

After a run of injury and the suspension of David Pittman prior to the 1997 AFL Preliminary Final, Adelaide Crows coach Malcolm Blight called Keating up from the Norwood SANFL side. Keating subsequently played in the Premiership for Adelaide in just his third AFL match. A week later, Keating played in a Premiership for his SANFL club Norwood.

Keating's brother Clark is a former AFL player who won three premierships with the Brisbane Lions.

== Statistics ==
Legend
G	Goals	K	Kicks	D	Disposals	T	Tackles
B	Behinds	H	Handballs	M	Marks	H/O	Hit-outs

Season	Team	No.	Games	Totals								Averages (per game)							
Season	Team	No.	Games	G	B	K	H	D	M	T	H/O	G	B	K	H	D	M	T	H/O
1997†	Adelaide	20	3	0	1	2	5	7	3	3	21	0.0	0.3	0.7	1.7	2.3	1.0	1.0	7.0
1998	Adelaide	20	3	1	1	8	11	19	7	3	26	0.3	0.3	2.7	3.7	6.3	2.3	1.0	8.7
Career			6	1	2	10	16	26	10	6	47	0.2	0.3	1.7	2.7	4.3	1.7	1.0	7.8
