= Aaron Lord =

Australian rules footballer

Personal information
- Full name: Aaron Lord
- Born: 21 July 1975 (age 51)
- Original team: Central U18
- Height: 186 cm (6 ft 1 in)
- Weight: 87 kg (192 lb)

Playing career^{1}
Years	Club	Games (Goals)
1994 – 1996	Geelong	32 (19)
1997 – 2001	Hawthorn	93 (136)
2002 – 2003	Geelong	25 (30)
Total		150 (185)
- ^{1} Playing statistics correct to the end of 2003.

Career highlights
- Hawthorn leading goalkicker: 1999; AFL Rising Star nominee: 1995; VFL premiership player: 2001

Aaron Lord (born 21 July 1975) is a former professional Australian rules footballer who played for Geelong and Hawthorn in the AFL.

A forward pocket specialist, Lord made his league debut in 1994 with Geelong. After three seasons with the Cats he moved to Hawthorn where he enjoyed his most prolific time up forward. He kicked a bag of 6 goals five times in his career and his best season tally came in 1999 when he topped Hawthorn's goalkicking with 42 goals. In 2002 he returned to Geelong at pick one in the pre-season draft before retiring at the end of the following season.

In 2004 Aaron was part of a reality TV show The Resort. The show had 15 young people renovating a holiday resort in Fiji. The show was a ratings disaster and Lord admitted to being "a little scarred from the whole reality TV experience."

He later found employment with the sports attache at the Australian Embassy in Paris and later as a senior adviser to the Victorian sports minister.
