= Brent Heaver =

Australian rules footballer (born 1971)

Personal information
- Born: 15 June 1971 (age 55)
- Original team: Epping
- Positions: Rover, forward pocket

Playing career^{1}
Years	Club	Games (Goals)
1990–1991	Melbourne	12 (12)
1992–1996	Carlton	64 (106)
1997–1998	Port Adelaide	16 (13)
Total		92 (131)
- ^{1} Playing statistics correct to the end of 1998.

Brent Heaver (born 15 June 1971) is a former Australian rules footballer who played for Melbourne Football Club, Carlton Football Club and the Port Adelaide Football Club in the Australian Football League (AFL) during the 1990s.

== AFL career ==
=== Melbourne career (1990–1991) ===
A rover and forward pocket, Heaver started his career at Melbourne and is often remembered for his debut game. Playing against Carlton at the MCG, he kicked five goals and had 20 disposals to set up a win.

=== Carlton career (1992–1996) ===
After two seasons he was delisted and Carlton picked him up in the 1992 Mid Season Draft. He had his best year at Carlton in 1993 when he kicked 48 goals to finish second in their goal kicking behind Stephen Kernahan. He played in the Grand Final against Essendon that season but finished in the losing team.

=== Port Adelaide career (1997–1998) ===
Heaver was traded to Port Adelaide for their inaugural year in the AFL and retired after the 1998 season. He is also noted for kicking Port Adelaide Power's second goal.

He commonly had injury issues in his time at Port Adelaide.

== Coaching ==
Heaver was senior coach of Greensborough in 2001 and 2002.

== Personal life ==
Heaver now lives in Canberra where he works for the Australian Federal Government.
