= List of AFL debuts in 1994 =

The 1994 Australian Football League (AFL) season was the 98th season of the VFL/AFL. The season saw 92 Australian rules footballers make their senior AFL debut and a further 50 players transfer to new clubs having previously played in the AFL.

== Summary ==
Summary of debuts in 1994
Club	VFL debuts	Change of club
Adelaide	8	1
Brisbane Bears	3	6
Carlton	5	4
Collingwood	7	6
Essendon	9	3
Fitzroy	8	5
Footscray	8	2
Geelong	7	0
Hawthorn	6	1
Melbourne	2	2
North Melbourne	5	2
Richmond	4	7
St Kilda	9	5
Sydney	8	6
West Coast	3	0
Total	92	50

== Debuts ==
Name	Club	Age at debut	Round debuted	Games	Goals	Notes
Brett Chalmers	Adelaide	20 years, 359 days	4	50	8	Father of Kyle Chalmers.
Sean Wellman	Adelaide	19 years, 222 days	6	34	9	
Nick Pesch	Adelaide	20 years, 22 days	17	31	15	
Martin McKinnon	Adelaide	19 years, 5 days	16	25	7	
Matthew Kluzek	Adelaide	19 years, 5 days	15	24	15	
Tony Hall	Adelaide	29 years, 192 days	1	17	30	Previously played for Hawthorn.
Shane Tongerie	Adelaide	23 years, 79 days	6	4	3	
Joshua Mail	Adelaide	19 years, 162 days	10	4	0	
Peter Turner	Adelaide	20 years, 112 days	8	3	1	
Nigel Lappin	Brisbane Bears	17 years, 292 days	3	279	174	Cousin of Matthew Lappin.
Chris Scott	Brisbane Bears	17 years, 328 days	1	215	79	AFL Premiership coach 2011 and 2022. Brother of Brad Scott.
Alastair Lynch	Brisbane Bears	25 years, 302 days	1	186	460	Previously played for Fitzroy.
Craig Lambert	Brisbane Bears	25 years, 173 days	1	96	27	Previously played for Richmond.
Andrew Bews	Brisbane Bears	29 years, 215 days	1	75	2	Father of Jed Bews. Previously played for Geelong.
Gilbert McAdam	Brisbane Bears	26 years, 362 days	1	58	44	Brother of Adrian and Greg McAdam. Previously played for St Kilda.
Craig Starcevich	Brisbane Bears	26 years, 322 days	1	20	16	Uncle of Brandon Starcevich. Previously played for Collingwood.
Troy Lehmann	Brisbane Bears	22 years, 37 days	10	8	1	Previously played for Collingwood.
Rudi Frigo	Brisbane Bears	20 years, 118 days	2	13	10	
Matthew Allan	Carlton	19 years, 126 days	15	140	72	
Dean Rice	Carlton	26 years, 57 days	8	118	42	Father of Bailey Rice and nephew of Colin Rice. Previously played for St Kilda.
Brad Pearce	Carlton	22 years, 292 days	11	77	151	Previously played for Brisbane.
Adrian Whitehead	Carlton	18 years, 228 days	3	63	22	
Barry Mitchell	Carlton	28 years, 110 days	1	38	25	Father of Tom Mitchell. Previously played for Sydney and Collingwood.
Troy Bond	Carlton	20 years, 256 days	1	36	26	Brother of Shane Bond.
Tony Lynn	Carlton	25 years, 346 days	3	27	14	Previously played for Brisbane.
James Cook	Carlton	20 years, 79 days	1	25	35	
Peter Green	Carlton	20 years, 25 days	10	1	0	
Nathan Buckley	Collingwood	21 years, 243 days	1	260	263	2003 Brownlow Medallist. Previously played for Brisbane.
Jon Hassall	Collingwood	20 years, 224 days	1	50	12	
Brett James	Collingwood	21 years, 101 days	1	42	26	Brother of Roger James.
Paul Sharkey	Collingwood	20 years, 11 days	13	26	4	
Aaron James	Collingwood	17 years, 209 days	10	23	6	
Trent Hotton	Collingwood	20 years, 234 days	18	17	14	
Damian Houlihan	Collingwood	18 years, 282 days	7	11	6	Brother of Adam and Ryan Houlihan.
Jon Ballantyne	Collingwood	24 years, 240 days	1	9	0	Previously played for Footscray.
Bradley Plain	Collingwood	24 years, 191 days	2	9	6	Previously played for Collingwood.
Stephen Ryan	Collingwood	24 years, 191 days	1	8	4	Brother of Des Ryan. Previously played for Richmond.
Brenton Sanderson	Collingwood	20 years, 55 days	5	4	1	Previously played for Adelaide.
Todd Curley	Collingwood	21 years, 86 days	3	3	1	
Justin Staritski	Collingwood	23 years, 322 days	10	1	0	Previously played for North Melbourne.
Damien Hardwick	Essendon	21 years, 248 days	5	153	13	AFL Premiership coach 2017, 2019 and 2020.
Che Cockatoo-Collins	Essendon	19 years, 21 days	1	85	109	Brother of David and Donald Cockatoo-Collins and uncle of Nakia Cockatoo.
Michael Prior	Essendon	20 years, 333 days	20	81	19	
Ben Doolan	Essendon	21 years, 75 days	1	76	7	Previously played for Sydney.
Barry Young	Essendon	23 years, 315 days	7	76	45	Previously played for Richmond.
Ryan O'Connor	Essendon	19 years, 314 days	7	63	47	
Scott Cummings	Essendon	20 years, 159 days	14	40	83	
Robert Stevenson	Essendon	17 years, 285 days	1	11	0	
Dale Kickett	Essendon	25 years, 326 days	1	8	7	Cousin of Derek Kickett and Lance Franklin. Previously played for West Coast, Fitzroy and St Kilda.
Russell Williams	Essendon	20 years, 093 days	5	3	1	
Lachlan Ross	Essendon	20 years, 318 days	14	2	1	
Julian Kirzner	Essendon	17 years, 314 days	24	1	1	
Chris Johnson	Fitzroy	17 years, 307 days	2	59	67	The last former Fitzroy player to retire.
Jarrod Molloy	Fitzroy	17 years, 325 days	2	59	54	Son of Shane Molloy and uncle of Chloe Molloy.
John Barker	Fitzroy	19 years, 42 days	2	47	12	
Matthew Dent	Fitzroy	22 years, 125 days	9	47	9	
Jeff Hogg	Fitzroy	26 years, 110 days	1	40	41	Previously played for Richmond.
Trent Cummings	Fitzroy	20 years, 88 days	1	27	18	Great-grandson of Joe Johnson, son of Percy Cummings and brother of Robert Cummings.
Rowan Warfe	Fitzroy	18 years, 31 days	18	26	1	
Steven Stretch	Fitzroy	30 years, 80 days	1	25	7	Father of Billy Stretch. Previously played for Melbourne.
Brett Cook	Fitzroy	21 years, 103 days	19	25	7	
David Bain	Fitzroy	27 years, 328 days	1	12	4	Previously played for Brisbane.
Kieran Sporn	Fitzroy	27 years, 210 days	1	12	6	Brother of Rachael Sporn. Previously played for Essendon.
Nick Mitchell	Fitzroy	21 years, 123 days	11	9	2	
Nigel Palfreyman	Fitzroy	20 years, 322 days	22	1	0	Previously played for Brisbane.
Brad Johnson	Footscray	18 years, 5 days	18	364	558	Club games record holder.
Luke Darcy	Footscray	19 years, 32 days	21	226	183	Son of David Darcy.
Craig Ellis	Footscray	18 years, 316 days	4	107	6	
Daniel Southern	Footscray	19 years, 84 days	1	103	28	
Jason Watts	Footscray	22 years, 240 days	1	57	51	
Richard Osborne	Footscray	29 years, 312 days	5	51	98	Brother of Graham Osborne. Previously played for Fitzroy and Sydney.
Kym Koster	Footscray	21 years, 62 days	2	38	13	
Daniel Hargraves	Footscray	18 years, 124 days	10	38	62	
Scott Allen	Footscray	19 years, 55 days	1	15	8	
Robbie West	Footscray	25 years, 34 days	3	7	1	Father of Connor West. Previously played for West Coast.
Shayne Breuer	Geelong	21 years, 198 days	1	71	77	
Grant Tanner	Geelong	23 years, 301 days	9	69	28	
Aaron Lord	Geelong	18 years, 276 days	5	57	49	
Cain Liddle	Geelong	18 years, 289 days	1	4	0	
Shane Crothers	Geelong	21 years, 35 days	20	4	0	
Cristian O'Brien	Geelong	20 years, 140 days	11	2	1	
Daniel Fletcher	Geelong	19 years, 292 days	11	1	0	Brother of Simon Fletcher.
Nick Holland	Hawthorn	20 years, 76 days	3	179	239	
Rayden Tallis	Hawthorn	18 years, 303 days	3	163	27	
Tim Hargreaves	Hawthorn	18 years, 329 days	5	42	57	
Shayne Stevenson	Hawthorn	24 years, 101 days	19	34	30	Previously played for Fitzroy.
Matthew Young	Hawthorn	21 years, 239 days	8	21	6	
Simon Crawshay	Hawthorn	19 years, 213 days	1	19	2	Brother of Matthew Young.
Paul Barnard	Hawthorn	21 years, 48 days	2	11	4	
Paul Prymke	Melbourne	23 years, 109 days	1	49	2	
Jeff Hilton	Melbourne	21 years, 304 days	1	43	23	Previously played for St Kilda.
Dean Irving	Melbourne	27 years, 352 days	22	23	4	Previously played for West Coast.
Brad Campbell	Melbourne	18 years, 229 days	19	1	0	Son of Des Campbell and brother of Blake Campbell.
David King	North Melbourne	22 years, 26 days	2	241	145	
Mathew Capuano	North Melbourne	18 years, 289 days	13	82	24	
Stuart Anderson	North Melbourne	19 years, 307 days	6	61	20	
Trent Nichols	North Melbourne	24 years, 360 days	2	33	39	Previously played for Richmond and West Coast.
Warren Campbell	North Melbourne	19 years, 200 days	7	19	17	
John Barnett	North Melbourne	18 years, 300 days	12	6	4	
Gareth John	North Melbourne	22 years, 103 days	6	1	0	Son of Graeme John. Previously played for Sydney.
Matthew Rogers	Richmond	20 years, 121 days	1	197	163	
Paul Broderick	Richmond	24 years, 82 days	1	169	90	Previously played for Fitzroy.
Michael Gale	Richmond	27 years, 95 days	1	91	20	Grandson of Jack Gale, son of Don Gale and brother of Brendon Gale. Previously played for Fitzroy.
Jamie Tape	Richmond	19 years, 355 days	1	75	4	
Mark Merenda	Richmond	18 years, 227 days	12	75	62	
Greg Dear	Richmond	30 years, 343 days	1	53	9	Brother of Paul Dear. Previously played for Hawthorn.
Mark Neeld	Richmond	24 years, 318 days	7	26	16	Previously played for Geelong.
Matthew Dundas	Richmond	22 years, 109 days	1	14	5	Previously played for Fitzroy.
Justin Murphy	Richmond	18 years, 41 days	11	12	9	
Jamie Elliott	Richmond	21 years, 48 days	1	9	1	Previously played for Fitzroy.
Haydn Robins	Richmond	21 years, 229 days	1	4	1	Previously played for Melbourne.
Shane Wakelin	St Kilda	19 years, 240 days	3	94	19	Brother of Darryl Wakelin.
David Sierakowski	St Kilda	19 years, 178 days	14	93	27	Son of Brian Sierakowski and cousin of Will Sierakowski.
Rod Keogh	St Kilda	23 years, 15 days	3	60	21	Previously played for Melbourne.
Matthew Lappin	St Kilda	18 years, 114 days	12	55	26	Cousin of Nigel Lappin.
Kristian Bardsley	St Kilda	21 years, 201 days	2	53	18	Previously played for North Melbourne.
Wayne Thornborrow	St Kilda	21 years, 132 days	7	13	10	
Doug Bailey	St Kilda	22 years, 110 days	1	11	2	
Michael Frost	St Kilda	23 years, 87 days	1	11	2	Previously played for Footscray.
David Strooper	St Kilda	26 years, 29 days	1	6	3	Previously played for Fitzroy and Sydney.
Clinton Shaw	St Kilda	18 years, 51 days	14	6	0	
Adrian Burns	St Kilda	22 years, 247 days	3	4	1	Previously played for Essendon.
Anthony Harvey	St Kilda	20 years, 354 days	08	4	1	Grandson of Merv Harvey, great-nephew of Neil Harvey and brother of Robert Harvey.
Alister Carr	St Kilda	21 years, 39 days	12	4	1	
Sam Jones	St Kilda	20 years, 25 days	10	3	3	
Brad Seymour	Sydney Swans	17 years, 328 days	1	133	12	
Daniel McPherson	Sydney Swans	18 years, 349 days	13	111	36	
Peter Filandia	Sydney Swans	23 years, 317 days	1	70	38	Previously played for Essendon.
Derek Kickett	Sydney Swans	31 years, 199 days	5	63	73	Previously played for North Melbourne and Essendon.
Wade Chapman	Sydney Swans	18 years, 102 days	4	51	19	
Adam Heuskes	Sydney Swans	18 years, 98 days	14	49	6	
Simon Garlick	Sydney Swans	19 years, 84 days	15	44	27	
Darren Gaspar	Sydney Swans	17 years, 325 days	3	21	1	Brother of Damien and Travis Gaspar.
Peter Caven	Sydney Swans	23 years, 315 days	7	18	4	Previously played for Fitzroy.
Mark Hepburn	Sydney Swans	25 years, 224 days	3	7	3	Previously played for North Melbourne and West Coast.
Dermott Brereton	Sydney Swans	29 years, 275 days	9	7	7	Previously played for Hawthorn.
Damian Lang	Sydney Swans	18 years, 24 days	1	5	4	
Shayne Smith	Sydney Swans	18 years, 337 days	1	4	1	
Matthew Ahmat	Sydney Swans	19 years, 287 days	1	2	0	Brother of Robert Ahmat. Previously played for Brisbane.
Paul Symmons	West Coast	20 years, 296 days	14	99	36	
Shane Bond	West Coast	18 years, 260 days	1	34	20	Brother of Troy Bond.
Brett Spinks	West Coast	20 years, 139 days	1	21	14	
