= 1993 AFL draft =

Draft for the Australian Football League

The 1993 AFL draft consisted of a mid-season draft, a national draft at the end of the season and a pre-season draft, held before the 1994 AFL season.

The AFL draft is the annual draft of new unsigned players by Australian rules football teams that participate in the main competition of that sport, the Australian Football League.

Clubs receive picks based on the position in which they finish on the ladder during the season, although these picks can be swapped around by teams for trading players.

This was the final season until 2019 during which a mid-season draft was conducted.

The 1993 National Draft was held on Friday, 29 October 1993, and was the first draft to be broadcast live on television.

== 1993 mid-season draft ==
| Pick | Player | Recruited from | Recruited by |
|---|---|---|---|
| 1 | Matthew Ahmat | Norwood | Sydney |
| 2 | James Thiessen | Richmond | Richmond |
| 3 | Anthony Harvey | Frankston | St Kilda |
| 4 | Damian Bourke | Geelong | Brisbane Bears |
| 5 | Brett Evans | Springvale | Melbourne |
| 6 | Tony Lynn | Central District | Carlton |
| 7 | Alan Thorpe | Oakleigh | Footscray |
| 8 | Tim Perkins | North Adelaide | Adelaide |
| 9 | John Cunningham | Port Melbourne | Geelong |
| 10 | Danny Dickfos | North Brisbane | Fitzroy |
| 11 | Dale Kickett | St Kilda | Essendon |
| 12 | Terry Keays | Frankston | Collingwood |
| 13 | Passed | - | West Coast |
| 14 | Simon Luhrs | Central District | Hawthorn |
| 15 | Andrew Krakouer | Sandringham | North Melbourne |
| 16 | Aldo Dipetta | Ainslie | Sydney |
| 17 | Brad Fox | Essendon | Richmond |
| 18 | Damian Ryan | Port Adelaide | Brisbane Bears |
| 19 | Haami Williams | South Barwon | Carlton |
| 20 | Russell Evans | Coburg | Footscray |
| 21 | Cristian O'Brien | Norwood | Geelong |
| 22 | Tom Kavanagh | Castlemaine | Fitzroy |
| 23 | Danny Morgan | Preston Knights | Essendon |
| 24 | Kane Batzloff | Chelsea | Collingwood |
| 25 | James Little | Sydney | Sydney |
| 26 | Brad Read | East Fremantle | Richmond |
| 27 | Stephan Cochrane | Richmond | Geelong |
| 28 | Anthony McGregor | Prahran | Fitzroy |
| 29 | Jamie Grant | Daylesford | Sydney |
| 30 | Dallas Normington | Werribee | Fitzroy |
| 31 | Phil Rowston | Sydney | Sydney |
| 32 | Brad Hardie | South Fremantle | Sydney |

== 1993 national draft ==
| Pick | Player | Recruited from | Recruited by |
|---|---|---|---|
| 1 | Darren Gaspar | South Fremantle | Sydney |
| 2 | Nigel Lappin | Chiltern | Brisbane Bears |
| 3 | Justin Murphy | Centrals Dragons | Richmond |
| 4 | Glenn Gorman | Geelong Falcons | Sydney |
| 5 | Adam Heuskes | Norwood | Sydney |
| 6 | Trent Cummings | Central District (SANFL) | Fitzroy |
| 7 | Chris Johnson | Northern Knights | Fitzroy |
| 8 | Michael Frost | Footscray | St Kilda |
| 9 | Rowan Warfe | Bendigo U18 | Fitzroy |
| 10 | Trent Ormond-Allen | Port Adelaide Magpies | Melbourne |
| 11 | Brad Johnson | Western U18s | Footscray |
| 12 | Chris Scott | Eastern Ranges | Brisbane Bears |
| 13 | David Ugrinic | Woodville West-Torrens Eagles | Geelong |
| 14 | Adam Simpson | Northern Knights | North Melbourne |
| 15 | Luke McCabe | Central District (SANFL) | Hawthorn |
| 16 | Fraser Gehrig | Murray Bushrangers | West Coast |
| 17 | Angelo Lekkas | Northern Knights | Hawthorn |
| 18 | Simon Beaumont | Centrals Dragons | Carlton |
| 19 | Robert Stevenson | Western U18 | Essendon |
| 20 | Wade Chapman | Geelong Falcons | Sydney |
| 21 | Shane Hodges | North Adelaide | Brisbane Bears |
| 22 | Dion Myles | Baulkham Hills | Sydney |
| 23 | Shannon Gibson | Northern Knights | Hawthorn |
| 24 | Cameron Bennett | North Adelaide | Brisbane Bears |
| 25 | Clinton Shaw | Southern U18 | St Kilda |
| 26 | Stephen Jurica | South Fremantle | Richmond |
| 27 | Brad Hall | Assumption | Melbourne |
| 28 | Daryl Griffin | Western (U18) | Sydney |
| 29 | Scott Mollard | Centrals Dragons | Essendon |
| 30 | Paul Lewis | Murray Bushrangers | Geelong |
| 31 | Mark Stevens | Gippsland Power | North Melbourne |
| 32 | Paul Barnard | East Perth | Hawthorn |
| 33 | Ben Robbins | Gippsland Power | West Coast |
| 34 | Stephen Patterson | Norwood | Collingwood |
| 35 | Aaron James | Western (U18) | Collingwood |
| 36 | Julian Kirzner | Centrals Dragons | Essendon |
| 37 | Ashley Thompson | Nyah-Nyah West Utd | Sydney |
| 38 | David Innella | Western U18 | Geelong |
| 39 | Jason Wild | Collingulie | Collingwood |
| 40 | Matthew Lappin | Chiltern | St Kilda |
| 41 | Kieran Sporn | Essendon | Fitzroy |
| 42 | Michael Prentice | Southern (U18) | Melbourne |
| 43 | Jason Heatley | Subiaco | West Coast |
| 44 | Eugene Warrior | Port Adelaide | Adelaide |
| 45 | Trent Bartlett | Deloraine (Tas) | Brisbane Bears |
| 46 | David King | Port Melbourne | North Melbourne |
| 47 | Chris Palmer | West Adelaide | Hawthorn |
| 48 | Matt Hopkins | West Adelaide | Carlton |
| 49 | Simon Garlick | Centrals Dragons | Sydney |
| 50 | Mark Merenda | West Perth | Richmond |
| 51 | Kristian Pascoe | Northern (U18) | St Kilda |
| 52 | Matthew Dent | Sturt Football Club | Fitzroy |
| 53 | Justin Mallon | Northern Knights | Collingwood |
| 54 | Sedat Sir | Centrals Dragons | Footscray |
| 55 | Grant Tanner | Norwood | Geelong |
| 56 | Rayden Tallis | Eastern Ranges | Hawthorn |
| 57 | Mark Hepburn | West Coast | Sydney |
| 58 | Jeff Bruce | Corowa-Rutherglen | Fitzroy |
| 59 | Craig Biddiscombe | Gippsland Power | Geelong |
| 60 | Troy Polak | Perth | North Melbourne |
| 61 | Shayne Smith | Southern (U18) | Sydney |
| 62 | Graeme Wood | Mildura | Fitzroy |
| 63 | Gareth John | Sydney | North Melbourne |
| 64 | Shane Hamilton | Brisbane | Brisbane Bears |
| 65 | Paul Mullarvey | Box Hill | Fitzroy |
| 66 | Andrew Schauble | Xavier(APS) | Collingwood |

== 1994 pre-season draft ==
| Pick | Player | Recruited from | Recruited by |
|---|---|---|---|
| 1 | Dermott Brereton | Hawthorn | Sydney Swans |
| 2 | Andrew Bews | Geelong | Brisbane Bears |
| 3 | Jamie Elliott | Fitzroy | Richmond |
| 4 | David Strooper | Sydney Swans | St Kilda |
| 5 | Steven Stretch | Melbourne | Fitzroy |
| 6 | Peter Filandia | Essendon | Sydney Swans |
| 7 | Haydn Robins | Melbourne | Richmond |
| 8 | Craig Lambert | Richmond | Brisbane Bears |
| 9 | Rod Keogh | Melbourne | St Kilda |
| 10 | Matthew Mansfield | Footscray | Fitzroy |
| 11 | Dean Irving | West Coast Eagles | Melbourne |
| 12 | Jason Watts | Werribee | Footscray |
| 13 | Jon Ballantyne | Footscray | Collingwood |
| 14 | Cain Liddle | Western U18 | Geelong |
| 15 | Trent Nichols | West Coast Eagles | North Melbourne |
| 16 | Simon Lethlean | Camberwell Grammar Football Club | Hawthorn |
| 17 | Scott Thompson | Subiaco Football Club | West Coast Eagles |
| 18 | Shane Tongerie | Central District Football Club | Adelaide Crows |
| 19 | Dean Rice | St Kilda | Carlton |
| 20 | Barry Young | Richmond | Essendon |
| 21 | Derek Kickett | Essendon | Sydney Swans |
| 22 | Andrew Bomford | North Shore Australian Football Club | Sydney Swans |
| 23 | Adam Slater | Richmond | Richmond |
| 24 | Adrian Burns | Essendon | St Kilda |
| 25 | Peter Doyle | Carlton | Fitzroy |
| 26 | John Carroll | St Bedes Football Club | Melbourne |
| 27 | Daniel Hargraves | Eastern U18 | Footscray |
| 28 | Trent Hotton | Preston Football Club | Collingwood |
| 29 | David Muir | Claremont Football Club | North Melbourne |
| 30 | Shayne Stevenson | Fitzroy | Hawthorn |
| 31 | Matthew Kluzek | Woodville-West Torrens | Adelaide Crows |
| 32 | Brad Pearce | Brisbane Bears | Carlton |
| 33 | Doug Bailey | Old Xaverians | St Kilda |
| 34 | Stephen Ryan | Richmond | Collingwood |
| 35 | Peter Green | Sydney Swans | Carlton |
| 36 | Kristian Bardsley | North Melbourne | St Kilda |
| 37 | Justin Staritski | North Melbourne | Collingwood |
| 38 | Daniel McCarthy | Frankston Football Club | St Kilda |
| 39 | Alister Carr | Essendon | St Kilda |
