= 2001 WAFL season =

Australian rules football season

- Teams: 9
- Premiers: East Perth; 16th premiership
- Minor premiers: Claremont; 12th minor premiership
- Sandover Medallist: Ryan Turnbull (East Perth)
- Bernie Naylor Medallist: Paul Medhurst (Claremont)
- Matches played: 85

The 2001 WAFL season was the 117th season of the various incarnations of the West Australian Football League. Following the off-season "Fong Report" by WAFC President Neale Fong which was written as a response to the problems then faced on-and off-field by AFL and domestic football in Western Australia, the league reverted to calling itself the "WAFL" because it was acknowledged "Westar Rules" was painfully contrived and did not reflect the history or traditions of the local game.

2001 also saw the abandonment of the "double-header" system of playing finals that began with the replay of the 1989 First semi-final, and also an unsuccessful experiment of giving each club four byes during the home-and-away season rather than three.

East Perth continued on from their dominance of the 2000 season to win a second successive premiership for the first time in forty-two seasons, thrashing a South Fremantle team that came from third position – after along with minor premiers Claremont completely dominating the season up to the end of May – to the Grand Final. Former West Coast Eagle regular Ryan Turnbull became the second player in four seasons to complete the Sandover/Simpson double. 2000 Grand Finalists East Fremantle, after having the best WAFL/Westar record during the 1990s, fell to second-last ahead of only financially crippled Swan Districts and were to play only one final during the rest of the decade. Peel Thunder, after advancing to four wins in 2000, advanced further despite the "Fong Report" recommending the withdrawal of their licence and at one time looked a chance for the finals, but the off-field pressure caused them to falter severely in the run home.

== Home-and-away season ==
=== Round 1 ===
	Round 1
Saturday, 31 March	Peel Thunder 10.16 (76)	def.	Swan Districts 7.15 (57)	Rushton Park (crowd: 1183)
Saturday, 31 March	East Perth 8.20 (68)	def. by	South Fremantle 22.13 (145)	Leederville Oval (crowd: 1467)
Saturday, 31 March	West Perth 9.6 (60)	def. by	Claremont 19.7 (121)	Arena Joondalup (crowd: 1932)
Saturday, 31 March	Perth 10.7 (67)	def.	Subiaco 6.6 (42)	Lathlain Park (crowd: 1707)
	Bye; East Fremantle
Peel, already fighting for its very existence, defeat Swans for the first time in a tough, scrappy match and consequently are in the top four for the first time in their short history.; South Fremantle, after a very disappointing 2000, stun the Royals to back up outstanding form in the pre-season "Governor's Challenge", where they won all four matches.; New captain Paul Maher sets the standard for a Perth team with ten new faces, leading them to an upset win over high-flyers Subiaco, whose tall forwards Smith, Ambrose and Donnelly do not kick a single goal between them.

=== Round 2 ===
	Round 2
Saturday, 7 April	Claremont 17.16 (118)	def.	Peel Thunder 16.10 (106)	Claremont Oval (crowd: 1191)
Saturday, 7 April	East Fremantle 13.12 (90)	def.	West Perth 13.10 (88)	East Fremantle Oval (crowd: 1770)
Saturday, 7 April	Swan Districts 8.5 (53)	def. by	Perth 14.12 (96)	Bassendean Oval (crowd: 1848)
	Bye; East Perth, South Fremantle, Subiaco
New skipper Marshall Stockden, replacing the retired Stephen Bilcich, gives the Sharks a splendid comeback win with a goal from a bouncing shot almost on the siren.

=== Round 3 (Easter weekend) ===
	Round 3
Saturday, 14 April	Subiaco 16.6 (102)	def. by	Claremont 17.13 (115)	Subiaco Oval (crowd: 1686)
Saturday, 14 April	Peel Thunder 11.9 (75)	def.	Perth 10.12 (72)	Rushton Park (crowd: 2040)
Monday, 16 April	South Fremantle 11.16 (82)	def.	East Fremantle 11.5 (71)	Fremantle Oval (crowd: 5080)
Monday, 16 April	West Perth 13.11 (89)	def. by	East Perth 16.14 (110)	Arena Joondalup (crowd: 4010)
	Bye; Swan Districts
Sixteen-year-old Aboriginal forward Daniel Wells kicks 4.1 and gives two other goals away to give Peel a thrilling win after Perth stormed back in the third quarter.; A chant of "Eagles" (Note: In reference to East Perth serving as the host club for West Coast and thus having numerous Eagles players in their team.) by West Perth supporters backfires as Ryan Turnbull drives East Perth to a comfortable rebound from their opening debacle after a very even three quarters.

=== Round 4 ===
	Round 4
Saturday, 21 April	Swan Districts 10.11 (71)	def.	South Fremantle 20.17 (137)	Bassendean Oval (crowd: 1738)
Saturday, 21 April	Peel Thunder 15.10 (100)	def. by	West Perth 20.9 (129)	Rushton Park (crowd: 1812)
Saturday, 21 April	Claremont 18.15 (123)	def.	East Perth 5.4 (34)	Albany (crowd: 2240)
Saturday, 21 April	Perth 10.7 (67)	def. by	East Fremantle 14.17 (101)	Lathlain Park (crowd: 1570)
	Bye; Subiaco
Haaron Bokhari and Paul Medhurst kick ten between them as a powerful Tiger half-back line holds East Perth to their lowest score against Claremont.

=== Round 5 ===
	Round 5
Saturday, 28 April	East Fremantle 9.9 (63)	def. by	Claremont 12.10 (82)	East Fremantle Oval (crowd: 1667)
Saturday, 28 April	Subiaco 15.17 (107)	def.	Peel Thunder 11.8 (74)	Subiaco Oval (crowd: 1029)
Saturday, 28 April	West Perth 18.11 (119)	def.	Swan Districts 11.5 (71)	Arena Joondalup (crowd: 1815)
Saturday, 28 April	South Fremantle 12.15 (87)	def.	Perth 3.12 (30)	Fremantle Oval (crowd: 1584)
	Bye; East Perth
Injury-plagued Travis Gaspar shows the skills of older brother Darren as South Fremantle decimate Perth in a nine-goal first quarter romp before Perth's "flooding" tactics in defence cause the game to deteriorate as Daniel Schell kicks 5.8 (38) – mostly from easy shots.; Eighteen-year-old Quentin Lynch, on his WAFL debut, keeps West Perth ahead of the winless Swans, who fade out in the last quarter of what was previously a high-quality match.

=== Round 6 ===
	Round 6
Saturday, 5 May	Swan Districts 4.11 (35)	def. by	Subiaco 15.16 (106)	Bassendean Oval (crowd: 1570)
Saturday, 5 May	East Perth 13.9 (87)	def.	East Fremantle 10.10 (70)	Leederville Oval (crowd: 1677)
Saturday, 5 May	Claremont 10.14 (74)	def.	South Fremantle 5.8 (38)	Claremont Oval (crowd: 1815)
Saturday, 5 May	Perth 9.17 (71)	def.	West Perth 6.9 (45)	Lathlain Park (crowd: 1610)
	Bye; Peel Thunder
Minus key 2000 forwards Troy Wilson and Ashley Hutchinson, East Perth achieve a confidence-building victory over a persistent East Fremantle via consistent experimentation up forward.; Dale Kickett, in his first match for Claremont since the 1993 Grand Final, (Note: Kickett had earned a nine-week suspension in the second 2000 Western Derby.) forms part of a rock-solid Tiger defence that easily wins the battle of the WAFL heavyweights.; Perth, against a Falcon side weakened by the loss of Brendon Fewster, move to third as their enthusiasm offsets lack of experience and "flooding" tactics make goals almost impossible to get.

=== Round 7 ===
	Round 7
Saturday, 12 May	East Fremantle 8.13 (61)	def. by	Swan Districts 10.8 (68)	East Fremantle Oval (crowd: 1158)
Saturday, 12 May	East Perth 12.11 (83)	def.	Perth 2.12 (24)	Leederville Oval (crowd: 1368)
Saturday, 12 May	West Perth 9.8 (62)	drew with	Subiaco 8.14 (62)	Arena Joondalup (crowd: 1057)
Saturday, 12 May	South Fremantle 22.15 (147)	def.	Peel Thunder 3.3 (21)	Fremantle Oval (crowd: 1532)
	Bye; Claremont
West Perth pile on six unanswered goals in ten minutes in very wet weather, but after umpire Mark Fussell does not allow a mark to Quinten Lynch on the siren the match becomes only the third draw since the 1989 First semi-final, and the first in 328 games since Round 16, 1997. As of 2026 this remains Subiaco's last drawn match.; East Perth, overwhelming a weakened Demon attack and having their own targets in Dean Buszan and Kane Marsh, end a disjointed start to 2001 and show premiership form for the first time.; With Andrew Embley showing his readiness for an AFL recall, Swan Districts come back for their first win after being behind all day.; Peel kick the lowest score against South Fremantle since Perth kicked 1.7 (13) in 1952.

=== Round 8 ===
	Round 8
Saturday, 19 May	Swan Districts 13.4 (82)	def. by	East Perth 14.11 (95)	Bassendean Oval (crowd: 2014)
Saturday, 19 May	Peel Thunder 17.16 (118)	def.	East Fremantle 14.9 (93)	Rushton Park (crowd: 1302)
Saturday, 19 May	Subiaco 8.2 (50)	def. by	South Fremantle 13.13 (91)	Subiaco Oval (crowd: 1578)
Saturday, 19 May	Perth 4.15 (39)	def. by	Claremont 9.6 (60)	Lathlain Park (crowd: 1383)
	Bye; West Perth
Peel Thunder gain a satisfying victory over East Fremantle – the club most opposed to the extension of their licence – due to the Sharks' lack of pace, and rise to fifth despite their preceding thrashing.; Perth are the first WANFL/WAFL/WASFL/Westar Rules team goalless at three-quarter time since East Fremantle, also at Lathlain Park, in Round 15, 1967, but after kicking three of the first four goals in the last quarter are within three points before Claremont kick four in quick succession to stay undefeated.

=== Round 9 ===
	Round 9
Saturday, 26 May	East Fremantle 8.12 (60)	def. by	Subiaco 18.13 (121)	East Fremantle Oval (crowd: 1298)
Saturday, 26 May	Claremont 19.16 (130)	def.	Swan Districts 8.7 (55)	Claremont Oval (crowd: 1406)
Saturday, 26 May	South Fremantle 14.15 (99)	def.	West Perth 12.6 (78)	Fremantle Oval (crowd: 1593)
Sunday, 27 May	East Perth 9.14 (68)	def. by	Peel Thunder 11.11 (77)	Collie (crowd: 1088)
	Bye; Perth
For the only time to date, the WAFL play a match in the coal-mining town of Collie, in East Perth's country zone. The game becomes Peel's first win over an eventual premier club, and continues East Perth's hoodoo in matches staged in country centres, as former Thunder star Buszan scores 2.7 (19).

=== Round 10 (Foundation Day) ===
	Round 10
Saturday, 2 June	Subiaco 12.6 (78)	def.	Claremont 10.12 (72)	Subiaco Oval (crowd: 1924)
Saturday, 2 June	Perth 15.9 (99)	def.	Peel Thunder 6.12 (48)	Lathlain Park (crowd: 1721)
Monday, 4 June	East Fremantle 8.7 (55)	def. by	South Fremantle 12.13 (85)	East Fremantle Oval (crowd: 7540)
Monday, 4 June	East Perth 20.13 (133)	def.	West Perth 8.10 (58)	Leederville Oval (crowd: 2890)
	Bye; Swan Districts
After the turmoil associated with the sacking of Fremantle coach Damian Drum, Daniel Bandy, relegated from the Dockers, controls the ruck and plays in a winning team for the first time in 2001 to push Perth back into the four.; Dean Buszan's nine goals gives East Perth a crushing win that shows them still firm premiership hopes, but relegates the Falcons to their worst start since 1992.

=== Round 11 ===
	Round 11
Saturday, 9 June	Peel Thunder 23.11 (149)	def.	Swan Districts 11.12 (78)	Rushton Park (crowd: 2012)
Saturday, 9 June	South Fremantle 7.10 (52)	def. by	East Perth 13.23 (101)	Fremantle Oval (crowd: 1457)
Sunday, 10 June	Subiaco 14.9 (93)	def.	Perth 7.11 (53)	Subiaco Oval (crowd: 1497)
	Bye; Claremont, East Fremantle, West Perth
The free-roaming play of David Swan on a wet and muddy Fremantle Oval ensures East Perth completely eclipse the league leaders after half-time.; The loss of out-of-form ruckman Daniel Bandy after a major collision with Lion Richard Ambrose turns an arm-wrestle into a thrashing as Andrew Wills decimates the Demons.; Peel Thunder, despite remaining under threats of being axed from the WAFL, record what remains as of 2014 their highest score and greatest winning margin.

=== Round 12 ===
	Round 12
Saturday, 16 June	Swan Districts 9.13 (67)	def. by	Perth 11.8 (74)	Bassendean Oval (crowd: 2403)
Saturday, 16 June	Claremont 17.9 (111)	def.	Peel Thunder 10.12 (72)	Claremont Oval (crowd: 1339)
Saturday, 16 June	West Perth 9.12 (66)	def. by	East Fremantle 14.7 (91)	Arena Joondalup (crowd: 1564)
	Bye; East Perth, South Fremantle, Subiaco
Six goals by Graham Polak on his seventeenth birthday gives 2000 runners-up East Fremantle a third win and leaves West Perth second last and seemingly out of finals contention.; Out-of-form ex-AFL star Scott Cummings, relegated from the poorly-performing Eagles, is unexpectedly thrashed by Anthony Buselik in his eighth WAFL/Westar Rules match, and Swans fail to reap an expected benefit.

=== Round 13 ===
	Round 13
Saturday, 23 June	East Perth 14.11 (95)	def.	Subiaco 14.9 (93)	Leederville Oval (crowd: 2348)
Saturday, 23 June	South Fremantle 8.11 (59)	def. by	Claremont 11.16 (82)	Fremantle Oval (crowd: 2051)
	Bye; East Fremantle, Peel Thunder, Perth, Swan Districts, West Perth
Led by Ryan Turnbull and Devan Perry, East Perth win a thrilling match with two goals direct from clearances in the final minute and remain in touch with top club Claremont.

=== Round 14 ===
	Round 14
Saturday, 30 June	East Fremantle 17.9 (111)	def. by	East Perth 18.9 (117)	East Fremantle Oval (crowd: 1935)
Saturday, 30 June	Subiaco 12.19 (91)	def.	Swan Districts 10.7 (67)	Subiaco Oval (crowd: 1446)
Saturday, 30 June	Perth 10.12 (72)	def. by	West Perth 18.13 (121)	Bruce Rock (crowd: 1178)
	Bye; Claremont, Peel Thunder, South Fremantle
Troy Wilson, despite playing with three pairs of socks in the boots of Dean Buszan, kicks seven goals to ward off a potential Shark upset.

=== Round 15 ===
	Round 15
Saturday, 7 July	Swan Districts 10.9 (69)	def. by	West Perth 11.14 (80)	Bassendean Oval (crowd: 1641)
Saturday, 7 July	Peel Thunder 13.14 (92)	def.	Subiaco 12.9 (81)	Rushton Park (crowd: 1902)
Saturday, 7 July	Claremont 17.11 (113)	def.	East Fremantle 10.10 (70)	Claremont Oval (crowd: 1574)
Saturday, 7 July	Perth 9.7 (61)	def. by	South Fremantle 10.8 (68)	Lathlain Park (crowd: 1529)
	Bye; East Perth
A spiteful incident where Subiaco centreman Brad Campbell breaks his jaw fails to rouse the Lions enough to prevent Peel's sixth win in seven home games, which places the Thunder only half a game behind the fourth-placed Lions.; A flu epidemic and two byes in three rounds fails to undermine second-placed South Fremantle, who manage to all but end Perth's finals hopes in the slippery conditions.

=== Round 16 ===
	Round 16
Saturday, 14 July	East Fremantle 18.11 (119)	def.	Perth 11.13 (79)	East Fremantle Oval (crowd: 1673)
Saturday, 14 July	East Perth 19.12 (126)	def.	Claremont 10.6 (66)	Leederville Oval (crowd: 2725)
Saturday, 14 July	West Perth 17.17 (119)	def.	Peel Thunder 12.8 (80)	Arena Joondalup (crowd: 1588)
Saturday, 14 July	South Fremantle 18.16 (124)	def.	Swan Districts 7.10 (52)	Fremantle Oval (crowd: 1632)
	Bye; Subiaco
West Perth maintain their perfect record against Peel thanks to the return of former big man Brett King, whose presence in the ruck allows Laurie Belotti and Simon Duckworth to solve forward woes created by the loss of Digby Morrell.

=== Round 17 ===
	Round 17
Saturday, 21 July	Swan Districts 14.7 (91)	def. by	East Fremantle 19.10 (124)	Bassendean Oval (crowd: 1892)
Saturday, 21 July	Peel Thunder 9.9 (63)	def. by	South Fremantle 22.13 (145)	Rushton Park (crowd: 2349)
Saturday, 21 July	Subiaco 8.9 (57)	def. by	West Perth 8.11 (59)	Subiaco Oval (crowd: 1962)
Saturday, 21 July	Perth 8.7 (55)	def. by	East Perth 11.11 (77)	Lathlain Park (crowd: 2798)
	Bye; Claremont
West Perth coach Andrew Lockyer has an unexpected success via leaving 1999 Simpson Medallist Christian Kelly on the bench, as his fresh legs give the Falcons a stirring win after having only four goals on the board with ten minutes remaining. Simon Duckworth helps Kelly by kicking three late goals from centre half-forward.

=== Round 18 ===
	Round 18
Saturday, 28 July	East Fremantle 15.3 (93)	def. by	Peel Thunder 16.9 (105)	East Fremantle Oval (crowd: 1244)
Saturday, 28 July	East Perth 16.13 (109)	def.	Swan Districts 9.6 (60)	Leederville Oval (crowd: 2057)
Saturday, 28 July	Claremont 14.10 (94)	def.	Perth 12.9 (81)	Claremont Oval (crowd: 1252)
Sunday, 29 July	South Fremantle 7.11 (53)	def. by	Subiaco 14.11 (95)	Fremantle Oval (crowd: 1432)
	Bye; West Perth
Subiaco, at full strength for the first time in 2001, jump second-placed South Fremantle to stay ahead of the Thunder and Falcons in fourth. The Bulldogs do not goal until nineteen minutes into the second quarter and are 4.6 (30) when heavy rain starts at three-quarter time.; East Perth, led by defender Andrew Waller who shuts out Bernard Carney after the latter kicked four goals in the first quarter, score 15.8 (98) to 2.2 (14) after quarter-time when a huge upset by the one-win Swans looked on the agenda.; Despite East Fremantle recording statistically its fourth most accurate score on record, Peel record as of 2014 their only win at East Fremantle Oval.

=== Round 19 ===
	Round 19
Saturday, 4 August	Swan Districts 12.11 (83)	def.	Claremont 10.2 (62)	Bassendean Oval (crowd: 2253)
Saturday, 4 August	East Perth 25.17 (167)	def.	Peel Thunder 8.8 (56)	Leederville Oval (crowd: 1559)
Saturday, 4 August	East Fremantle 10.13 (73)	def. by	Subiaco 20.20 (140)	Kalgoorlie (crowd: 4192)
Saturday, 4 August	West Perth 9.16 (70)	def. by	South Fremantle 13.6 (84)	Arena Joondalup (crowd: 1536)
	Bye; Perth
After being a goal behind at half-time, East Perth kick 20.7 (127) to 1.4 (10) in the second half. Their 13.3 (81) in the last quarter is the most in any quarter against Peel. Dean Buszan, who shifted from Peel to East Perth under the host club agreement, kicked nine goals.; West Perth effective seal the four with three rounds remaining by kicking only 0.6 (6) from nine shots with the wind in the last quarter.; Swan Districts, with only one win, lead all day to record a shock upset over Claremont in John Todd's seven hundredth match as coach, as rejuvenated forward Scott Cummings and Craig DeCorsey provide targets previously missing and kick eight of their twelve majors.

=== Round 20 ===
	Round 20
Saturday, 11 August	East Fremantle 10.6 (66)	def. by	West Perth 16.12 (108)	East Fremantle Oval (crowd: 1536)
Saturday, 11 August	Peel Thunder 7.7 (49)	def. by	Claremont 23.20 (158)	Rushton Park (crowd: 2028)
Saturday, 11 August	Subiaco 10.12 (72)	def. by	East Perth 15.10 (100)	Subiaco Oval (crowd: 2356)
Saturday, 11 August	Perth 12.14 (86)	def.	Swan Districts 12.4 (76)	Lathlain Park (crowd: 1701)
	Bye; South Fremantle
Ex-Lions Matt Balchin and Paul Ridley allow the Royals to overcome the late withdrawal of Dean Buszan and take second position, Subiaco completely dominate between the midpoints of the third and last quarter but score only one goal and East Perth rebound solidly.; Brad Wira's return to form highlights Claremont's thrashing of a Peel club facing an uncertain future in the WAFL and losing Derek Hall and Daniel Haines very early in the match.; Andrew Lockyer's policy of playing star players from the bench comes up another trump as West Perth see Regan Duckworth, Brendan Logan and Paul Stockden to cash in on a tired East Fremantle midfield and keep the Falcons' finals hopes alive. Stockden, with three last-quarter goals, wards off a Shark surge.

=== Round 21 ===
	Round 21
Saturday, 18 August	Claremont 14.11 (95)	def.	Subiaco 7.16 (58)	Claremont Oval (crowd: 1628)
Saturday, 18 August	West Perth 11.10 (76)	def.	East Perth 10.14 (74)	Arena Joondalup (crowd: 2593)
Saturday, 18 August	South Fremantle 26.10 (166)	def.	East Fremantle 13.6 (84)	Fremantle Oval (crowd: 2119)
	Bye; Peel Thunder, Perth, Swan Districts
West Perth rover Glenn Britten makes a remarkable steal from Dean Buszan to knock the ball away and create the winning goal, backed up by a six-goal third quarter and superb defence at the finish that restricts the Royals to two behinds.; This result ended East Perth's run of nine straight and left West Perth only percentage behind Subiaco, though with a much tougher final match.; Despite listing and not playing a completely unfit Travis Gaspar to make him eligible for the WAFL finals, South Fremantle have no trouble with the Sharks, leading 15.6 (96) to 4.4 (28) at half-time.

=== Round 22 ===
	Round 22
Saturday, 25 August	Swan Districts 22.16 (148)	def.	Peel Thunder 8.8 (56)	Bassendean Oval (crowd: 1640)
Saturday, 25 August	East Perth 10.15 (75)	def.	South Fremantle 9.8 (62)	Leederville Oval (crowd: 2574)
Saturday, 25 August	Claremont 18.8 (116)	def.	West Perth 11.10 (76)	Claremont Oval (crowd: 2300)
Saturday, 25 August	Perth 6.8 (44)	def. by	Subiaco 18.11 (119)	Lathlain Park (crowd: 2101)
	Bye; East Fremantle
East Perth's dominance of general play finally pays off in the last quarter and the Royals take the double chance, but face the report of veteran David Swan, who was taken to hospital after vomiting blood.; Despite losing Scott Cummings to a back injury at quarter-time, last-placed Swan Districts crush Peel with the unheralded Ben Piggott booting six goals and Adam Hunter five. The Swans scored 8.5 (53) to 0.0 (0) in the final quarter.

== Ladder ==
2001 WAFL ladder
Pos	Team	Pld	W	L	D	PF	PA	PP	Pts
1	Claremont	18	15	3	0	1792	1249	143.5	60
2	East Perth (P)	18	14	4	0	1719	1371	125.4	56
3	South Fremantle	18	13	5	0	1724	1201	143.5	52
4	Subiaco	18	9	8	1	1567	1307	119.9	38
5	West Perth	18	8	9	1	1503	1566	96.0	34
6	Peel Thunder	18	7	11	0	1417	1990	71.2	28
7	Perth	18	6	12	0	1170	1428	81.9	24
8	East Fremantle	18	5	13	0	1495	1783	83.8	20
9	Swan Districts	18	3	15	0	1283	1775	72.3	12

Rules for classification: 1) points; 2) percentage; 3) number of points for.
(P) Premiers

== Finals ==
=== First semi-final ===
	First semi-final
Sunday, 2 September	South Fremantle 15.11 (101)	def.	Subiaco 10.13 (73)	Subiaco Oval (crowd: 4,309)
With the Bulldogs severely short of tall players due to injury, coach Peter Sumich moves Rick Mott and veteran Marty Atkins into the ruck – where they are extremely successful and overpower the Lions.

=== Second semi-final ===
	Second semi-final
Saturday, 8 September	Claremont 9.7 (61)	def. by	East Perth 20.13 (133)	Subiaco Oval (crowd: 6,778)
With East Perth's superb win, Tony Micale becomes the fifth WAFL coach to appear in five consecutive Grand Finals, (Note: The others were Phil Matson with East Perth from 1919 to 1923, Clive Lewington with South Fremantle from 1950 to 1954, Jack Sheedy with East Perth from 1956 to 1961, and Gerard Neesham with Claremont from 1987 to 1991) and the only one to do so with multiple clubs. Claremont's troubles began with the loss of key rover Ben Cunningham in the second quarter, after which they were overwhelmed.

=== Preliminary final ===
	Preliminary final
Saturday, 15 September	South Fremantle 14.9 (93)	def.	Claremont 12.13 (85)	Subiaco Oval (crowd: 4,894)
Travis Gaspar does a remarkable job of overcoming severe hamstring problems to play a decisive role as a ruckman in the Bulldogs' victory.

=== Grand Final ===
2001 WAFL Grand Final
Saturday, 22 September	East Perth	def.	South Fremantle	Subiaco Oval (crowd: 23,842)
2.7 (19); 7.12 (54); 11.12 (78); 17.18 (120)	Q1; Q2; Q3; Final	3.1 (19); 5.4 (34); 5.7 (37); 5.8 (38)	Umpires: Craig Hendrie, Mark Fussell, David Corcoran; Simpson Medal: Ryan Turnbull (East Perth)
Perry 3, Buszan 3, Symmons 2, Munro 2, Wheatley, Barnard, Cowell, Waller, Humm, Haynes, Antonowicz	Goals	Gaspar 2, Chisholm, Sampi, Dodd
Wheatley, Perry, Cowell, Webster, Turnbull, Symmons	Best	Gaspar, Tinsley, Chisholm, Burridge, Gault, McGrath
Injuries	Mott (hamstring) replaced in selected side by Burridge; Atkins (thigh); Chisholm (shoulder); Thompson (ankle)
East Perth's powerful, tough rucks destroy a depleted South Fremantle team, with Turnbull leading the charge a day before his thirtieth birthday.
