= Nakia Cockatoo =

Australian rules footballer

Personal information
- Full name: Nakia Cockatoo
- Born: 23 October 1996 (age 30)
- Original team: NT Thunder (NEAFL)
- Draft: No. 10, 2014 national draft
- Height: 186 cm (6 ft 1 in)
- Weight: 90 kg (198 lb)
- Position: Midfielder / Forward

Club information
- Current club: Retired
- Number: 12

Playing career^{1}
Years	Club	Games (Goals)
2015–2020	Geelong	34 (25)
2021–2023	Brisbane Lions	15 (7)
Total		49 (32)
- ^{1} Playing statistics correct to the end of 2023.

Nakia Cockatoo (/nəˈkaɪə/ nə-KY-ə; born 23 October 1996) is a former professional Australian rules footballer who played for the Brisbane Lions and Geelong in the Australian Football League (AFL).

== Early life ==
Cockatoo was born in the Northern Territory into a family of Indigenous Australian descent (Jupangati and Marrithiyal) and was raised in the small town of Humpty Doo. He began playing football at Auskick level with the Humpty Doo Bombers. He played his junior football with Southern Districts in the NTFL and the Northern Territory Thunder in the NEAFL.

He has strong family connections to Queensland, with his surname deriving from his great-great-great grandfather, who was known as 'Old Man Cockatoo' in the Cape York Peninsula as well as three of his Queensland-based uncles Che, David and Donald playing professional football in the AFL. Several female cousins of his are also involved in the Gold Coast Suns' developmental football academy.

== AFL career ==
Cockatoo was drafted with pick 10 in the 2014 AFL draft, by Geelong Football Club. He made his debut in the first round of the 2015 AFL season against Hawthorn.

At the conclusion of the 2020 AFL season, Cockatoo was traded to the Brisbane Lions, where he would play 15 games before retiring at the conclusion of the 2023 season.

== Statistics ==
Legend
G	Goals	K	Kicks	D	Disposals	T	Tackles
B	Behinds	H	Handballs	M	Marks

Season	Team	No.	Games	Totals							Averages (per game)						
Season	Team	No.	Games	G	B	K	H	D	M	T	G	B	K	H	D	M	T
2015	Geelong	5	11	3	5	47	37	84	29	19	0.3	0.5	4.3	3.4	7.6	2.6	1.7
2016	Geelong	5	10	11	5	74	42	116	28	39	1.1	0.5	7.4	4.2	11.6	2.8	3.9
2017	Geelong	5	11	11	11	73	30	103	24	42	1.0	1.0	6.6	2.7	9.4	2.2	3.8
2018	Geelong	5	2	0	2	14	11	25	6	4	0.0	1.0	7.0	5.5	12.5	3.0	2.0
2019	Geelong	5	0	–	–	–	–	–	–	–	–	–	–	–	–	–	–
2020	Geelong	5	0	–	–	–	–	–	–	–	–	–	–	–	–	–	–
2021	Brisbane Lions	12	7	5	1	18	24	42	5	22	0.7	0.1	2.6	3.4	6.0	0.7	3.1
2022	Brisbane Lions	12	8	2	2	49	27	76	22	22	0.3	0.3	6.1	3.4	9.5	2.8	2.8
2023	Brisbane Lions	12	0	–	–	–	–	–	–	–	–	–	–	–	–	–	–
Career			49	32	26	275	171	446	114	148	0.7	0.5	5.6	3.5	9.1	2.3	3.0
