= Douglas Bailey =

Doug or Douglas(s) Bailey may refer to:

== Political figures ==
- Doug Bailey (1933–2013), American Republican political consultant and philanthropist
- Doug Bailey (born 1962), mayor of Cypress, California
- Douglas Bailey, English political activist, unsuccessful in Newham London Borough Council election, 2010

== Others ==
- Douglas Carr Bailey (1915–1977), Scottish architect and town planner; completed Bevin Court
- Doug Bailey (born 1948), American actor and writer, see (List of One Day at a Time episodes)
- Father Douglas Bailey (born 1949), American Salvatorian Roman Catholic priest, chaplain at Newman Centers
- Douglas A. Bailey (born 1958), American horticulturist and academic at University of Georgia College of Agricultural and Environmental Sciences
- Doug Bailey (born 1960), Iowa radio personality for classic rock station KGGO
- Douglass W. Bailey (born 1963), American anthropologist, archeologist and academic, on (Cucuteni-Trypillian culture)
- Doug Bailey (footballer) (born 1971), Australian rules footballer

== Fictional characters ==
- Doug Bailey (played by John Wesley Shipp), husband of Kim's sister in TV series Drop Dead Diva

== See also ==
- Bailey (surname)
