= Biddiscombe =

Biddiscombe is a surname. Notable people with the surname include:

- Carl Biddiscombe (1924–2000), American set decorator
- Craig Biddiscombe (born 1976), Australian rules footballer
