= Matthew Dundas =

Australian rules footballer

Personal information
- Full name: Matthew Dundas
- Born: 7 December 1971 (age 54)
- Original team: Assumption College
- Draft: No. 59, 1988 national draft
- Height: 178 cm (5 ft 10 in)
- Weight: 73 kg (161 lb)

Playing career^{1}
Years	Club	Games (Goals)
1990–1993	Fitzroy	73 (61)
1994–1995	Richmond	14 (5)
Total		87 (66)
- ^{1} Playing statistics correct to the end of 1995.

Matthew Dundas (born 7 December 1971) is a former Australian rules footballer who played with Fitzroy and Richmond in the Australian Football League (AFL).

Dundas, a rover, played 15 games in 1990, his first season. He was a regular fixture in the team in both 1991 and 1992, averaging 17 disposals a game in each of those years. Dundas polled nine Brownlow Medal votes in the 1992 AFL season. Only Paul Roos received more votes in the count from Fitzroy. His tally included two best on ground performances, a career high 30 disposal game against Essendon Football Club in the second game of the season and a 28 disposals, 3 goal effort, also against Essendon, later in the year. In the 1993 season he kicked a five-goal haul against Collingwood at Princes Park. It was the second time that he had kicked five goals, having also managed the feat in his debut season against the Sydney Swans. He finished his career at Richmond, where he was traded, along with Paul Broderick and Michael Gale, in exchange for pick six (Trent Cummings) of the 1993 AFL draft.
