= Ray Tallis =

Ray Tallis may refer to:

- Rayden Tallis (born 1975), Australian rules footballer
- Raymond Tallis (born 1946), British philosopher, doctor and writer
