= John Barnett (Australian rules footballer) =

Australian rules footballer

Personal information
- Full name: John Barnett
- Born: 15 August 1975 (age 51)
- Original teams: Endeavour Hills / Hawthorn
- Height: 175 cm (5 ft 9 in)
- Weight: 75 kg (165 lb)

Playing career^{1}
Years	Club	Games (Goals)
1994–1996	North Melbourne	6 (4)
1997	Collingwood	8 (4)
Total		14 (8)
- ^{1} Playing statistics correct to the end of 1997.

John Barnett (born 15 August 1975) is a former Australian rules footballer who played with North Melbourne and Collingwood in the Australian Football League (AFL).

Barnett played for Endeavour Hills and the Hawthorn Under 19s prior to joining North Melbourne. He had also appeared for Hawthorn in the 1992 Foster's Cup, the league's pre-season competition, when he was only 16. Hawthorn traded Barnett to North Melbourne during the 1993 AFL draft, in return for the 56th draft pick, which they used on Rayden Tallis.

A forward, he could only manage six appearances in his first two seasons and didn't play any games in 1996. He also failed to have an impact at Collingwood, who had acquired him in a trade.
