= Mark Graham (Australian footballer) =

Australian rules footballer

Personal information
- Full name: Mark Graham
- Born: 13 March 1973 (age 53)
- Original team: Berwick
- Height: 190 cm (6 ft 3 in)
- Weight: 84 kg (185 lb)

Playing career^{1}
Years	Club	Games (Goals)
1993 – 2004	Hawthorn	223 (61)
2005	Richmond	20 (2)
Total		243 (63)
- ^{1} Playing statistics correct to the end of 2005.

Career highlights
- AFL Rising Star nominee: 1994

Mark Graham (born 13 March 1973), is a former Australian rules football player who played with Hawthorn for over a decade before finishing his career at Richmond. He was a left-footed defender and possessed a strong overhead mark. In 2001, he finished second in the Hawks' best and fairest. Mark's last game against his former club, Hawthorn, was a memorable one, coming from behind in the last minutes of the game to defeat the Hawks.
