= Anthony McGregor =

Australian rules footballer

Personal information
- Full name: Anthony McGregor
- Born: 5 July 1972 (age 54)
- Original team: Prahran (VFA)
- Draft: No. 28, 1993 Mid-Season Draft
- Height: 185 cm (6 ft 1 in)
- Weight: 80 kg (176 lb)

Playing career^{1}
Years	Club	Games (Goals)
1993–1996	Fitzroy	41 (11)
- ^{1} Playing statistics correct to the end of 1996.

Anthony McGregor (born 5 July 1972) is a former Australian rules footballer who played with Fitzroy in the Australian Football League (AFL).

A utility from Victorian Football Association club Prahran, McGregor was selected by Fitzroy with pick 28 in the 1993 Mid-Season Draft. McGregor played 41 senior games from 1993 to 1996, Fitzroy's final season in the AFL. He received five Brownlow Medal votes in 1994, which was the equal third most by a Fitzroy player at the count.
