= Shane Hodges =

Australian rules footballer

Personal information
- Full name: Shane Hodges
- Born: 3 January 1975 (age 51)
- Original team: North Adelaide
- Draft: 21st, 1993 AFL draft
- Height: 180 cm (5 ft 11 in)
- Weight: 72 kg (159 lb)

Playing career^{1}
Years	Club	Games (Goals)
1995	Brisbane Bears	4 (0)
- ^{1} Playing statistics correct to the end of 1995.

Shane Hodges (born 3 January 1975) is a former Australian rules footballer who played with the Brisbane Bears in the Australian Football League (AFL).

Hodges was chosen by Brisbane with the 21st pick of the 1993 AFL draft, from SANFL club North Adelaide.

He didn't play AFL in 1994 and made his first league appearance in round 11 of the 1995 season, a win over Fitzroy at the Gabba. Hodges played just three further games for the Bears.
