= Peter Doyle (footballer, born 1973) =

Australian rules footballer

Personal information
- Full name: Peter Joseph Doyle
- Born: 24 August 1973 (age 53)
- Original team: Union
- Draft: 1. 21, 1989 National Draft #25, 1994 Pre-Season Draft
- Height: 179 cm (5 ft 10 in)
- Weight: 80 kg (176 lb)

Playing career^{1}
Years	Club	Games (Goals)
1990–1993	Carlton	0 (0)
1995–1996	Fitzroy	12 (2)
- ^{1} Playing statistics correct to the end of 1996.

Peter Joseph Doyle (born 24 August 1973) is a former Australian rules footballer who played with Fitzroy in the Australian Football League (AFL).

Doyle was initially drafted by Carlton, with their second pick and 21st overall in the 1989 National Draft. He served a long apprenticeship in the reserves but was delisted without making his senior debut. Instead he played senior football at Fitzroy, which selected him in the 1994 Pre-Season Draft. Doyle appeared in the final five rounds of the 1995 AFL season and his six appearances in 1996 included Fitzroy's final AFL match, against Fremantle. All of his 12 league appearances came in losses.
