= Sedat Sir =

Australian rules footballer

Personal information
- Full name: Sedat Sir
- Born: 6 March 1975 (age 51)
- Original team: Central Dragons
- Draft: 54th overall, 1993 National Draft
- Height: 188 cm (6 ft 2 in)
- Weight: 80 kg (176 lb)
- Position: Defender

Playing career^{1}
Years	Club	Games (Goals)
1994–98	Western Bulldogs	24 (0)
- ^{1} Playing statistics correct to the end of 1998.

Sedat Sir (born 6 March 1975) is a Turkish-Australian former Australian Rules footballer who played for the Western Bulldogs in the Australian Football League (AFL). Sedat, known as a solid defender, played 24 games at senior level between 1995 and 1998. He was also a member of the Western Bulldogs 1998 reserves premiership team. At the end of 1998, he was delisted by the Bulldogs and moved to the Victorian Football League team of Williamstown. He retired from regional football at EDFL club Greenvale, to make the move back to the Western Victoria Region team he once captained: Parkside.

Of Turkish heritage, Sedat Sir was the first Muslim footballer to play in the AFL at senior level.
