= John Cunningham (Australian footballer) =

Australian rules footballer

Personal information
- Full name: John Cunningham
- Born: 19 February 1974 (age 52)
- Original teams: Port Melbourne, (VFA)
- Draft: No. 9, 1993 Mid Year Draft

Playing career^{1}
Years	Club	Games (Goals)
1995	Geelong	2 (0)
- ^{1} Playing statistics correct to the end of 1995.

John Cunningham (born 19 February 1974) is a former Australian rules footballer who played for Geelong in the Australian Football League (AFL). He was recruited from the Port Melbourne Football Club in the Victorian Football Association (VFA) with the 9th selection in the 1993 Mid Year Draft, and played two matches for Geelong in 1995.

Cunningham later moved to South Australia and played in Norwood's 1997 South Australian National Football League (SANFL) Premiership side, winning the Jack Oatey Medal as the best player in the grand final.
