= Aaron Bruce =

Australian basketball player

Personal information
- Born: 19 December 1984 (age 41) Birchip, Victoria, Australia
- Listed height: 190 cm (6 ft 3 in)
- Listed weight: 86 kg (190 lb)

Career information
- High school: Horsham College (Horsham, Victoria)
- College: Baylor (2004–2008)
- NBA draft: 2008: undrafted
- Playing career: 2002–2013
- Position: Point guard / shooting guard

Career history
- 2002–2003: Australian Institute of Sport
- 2008–2009: Adelaide 36ers
- 2010–2011: Adelaide 36ers
- 2011: Eastern Mavericks
- 2011–2013: Sydney Kings

Career highlights
- NBL Rookie of the Year (2009); 3× All-Big 12 Honorable Mention (2005–2007); First-team Freshman All-American (2005)

Aaron Michael Bruce (born 19 December 1984) is an Australian former professional basketball player who played four seasons in the National Basketball League (NBL). He played college basketball for the Baylor Bears before playing in the NBL for the Adelaide 36ers and Sydney Kings.

== Early life and career ==
Born in Birchip, Victoria, Bruce attended Horsham College in nearby Horsham, where he graduated in 2002. He grew up playing for the Horsham Hornets.

In 2002 and 2003, Bruce attended the Australian Institute of Sport (AIS) in Canberra, where he played for the AIS men's team in the South East Australian Basketball League (SEABL).

Bruce signed a National Letter of Intent with Baylor University in November 2003.

== College career ==
As a freshman at Baylor in 2004–05, Bruce was the school's most productive freshman since Lawrence Roberts in 2001–02. He started all 28 games and led the team with 34.8 minutes per game, finishing as the nation's top-scoring freshman with 18.2 points per game (highest freshman average in Big 12 history). He was named freshman All-America by Basketball Times (first team), Rivals.com (second team) and CollegeInsider.com, while earning All-Big 12 honours by the Associated Press (third team), Kansas City Star (third team) and the Lawrence Journal-World (third team). He was also named the Big 12 Freshman of the Year by Kansas City Star, San Antonio Express-News and ESPN.com's Dick Vitale, and earned USBWA All-District 7 team honours.

As a sophomore in 2005–06, Bruce started all 17 games during school's abbreviated 2005–06 season – Baylor was barred from playing any non-conference games in 2005–06 due to a 2003 scandal. He was named All-Big 12 honourable mention by league coaches and Associated Press, earned Academic All-Big 12 second team honours, named to the Big 12 Commissioner's Honour Roll for fall 2005, and voted the Big 12's "Most Underrated Player" by opposing conference players in a poll taken by Sports Illustrated. He averaged 13.1 points, 3.5 rebounds and 3.2 assists per game on the season.

As a junior in 2006–07, Bruce played in 29 of 31 games (missed two games due to injury), starting all 29. He was named an honourable mention All-Big 12 selection for the third straight year and was named to the Spring 2007 Big 12 Commissioner's Honour Roll. On 21 February 2007, he became the 19th Baylor player to score 1,000 points with seven points in win over Nebraska. He averaged 11.3 points, 3.4 assists and 2.7 rebounds per game on the season.

As a senior in 2007–08, Bruce averaged 8.4 points, 1.7 rebounds and 1.9 assists per game and helped guide the Bears to the NCAA tournament for the first time in 20 years. He finished his college career as one of just four Bears ever to surpass 1,000 career points and 300 career assists. His 1,330 career points were at the time the seventh-most in school history.

=== College statistics ===
Year	Team	GP	GS	MPG	FG%	3P%	FT%	RPG	APG	SPG	BPG	PPG
2004–05	Baylor	28	28	34.8	.471	.399	.828	2.6	3.8	1.1	.2	18.2
2005–06	Baylor	17	17	31.1	.373	.407	.806	3.5	3.2	.4	.1	13.1
2006–07	Baylor	29	29	29.7	.415	.394	.803	2.7	3.4	.7	.1	11.3
2007–08	Baylor	32	23	21.6	.401	.358	.791	1.7	1.9	.9	.1	8.4
Career		106	98	28.8	.424	.390	.811	2.5	3.0	.8	.1	12.5

== Professional career ==
In April 2008, Bruce competed in the Portsmouth Invitational Tournament, where he averaged 6.3 points, 2.3 rebounds and 4.0 assists in three games. On 17 May 2008, he made a cameo appearance for the Horsham Hornets in the Big V Division Three, playing alongside his brothers Cameron and Shaun. In June 2008, he completed tryouts for a number of NBA teams, including the Dallas Mavericks, Washington Wizards, Los Angeles Clippers and Phoenix Suns. In July 2008, he played for the Seattle SuperSonics during the NBA Summer League, where he averaged 1.7 points, 1.3 rebounds and 3.0 assists in three games.

=== Adelaide 36ers ===
In August 2008, Bruce joined the Adelaide 36ers ahead of the 2008–09 NBL season. He scored 22 points in his first NBL game and averaged 10 points and five assists for the season. He was subsequently named NBL Rookie of the Year.

In 2009, Bruce took a career break in the United States, and in August 2010, he earned his undergraduate degree from Baylor University.

In December 2010, Bruce returned to Adelaide to work out with the 36ers. Following an injury to Rhys Carter, Bruce was brought into the side for the remainder of the 2010–11 season, making his comeback on 31 December. In 15 games, he averaged 6.0 points, 1.5 rebounds and 2.7 assists per game.

Following the conclusion of the 2010–11 NBL season, Bruce extended his stay in South Australia to play for the Eastern Mavericks in the Central ABL. In 15 games for the Mavericks, he averaged 17.7 points, 3.7 rebounds and 6.1 assists per game.

=== Sydney Kings ===
In May 2011, Bruce signed with the Sydney Kings. His 2011–12 season ended in January 2012 after suffering a vertical fracture to his tibia. In 17 games, he averaged 13.9 points, 2.6 rebounds and 4.4 assists per game. He returned to the Kings for the 2012–13 season and averaged 9.2 points, 2.7 rebounds and 3.1 assists in 29 games.

Following the 2012–13 season, Bruce retired from basketball after failing to negotiate a pay raise with the Kings. The club had asked him to take a pay cut; he instead chose to part ways with the team rather than accept a reduced contract.

== National team career ==
Bruce spent the summer of 2003 playing for the Australian junior national team that won gold at the 2003 FIBA Under-19 World Championship in Greece. He led Australia with 25 points in a 106–85 upset of Team USA, which featured Dee Brown and JJ Redick. He was also a member of the Australian Under-21 national team in 2004.

In the summer of 2005, Bruce served as captain of the Australian Under-21 national team. They played exhibition games in Europe and Canada before participating in the World Championship in Argentina. He went on to play for the Australian Boomers that tied for ninth place at 2006 FIBA World Championship in Japan. In six games, he averaged 4.2 points, 1.5 rebounds and 1.0 assists per game.

== Personal ==
Bruce is the son of Steve and Julie Bruce. His mother was a national-level swimmer while two of his uncles, Des and Stephen Ryan, played in the Australian Football League. He also has two younger brothers, Cameron and Shaun, both of whom are basketball players.
