= Shaun Bruce =

Australian basketball player (born 1991)

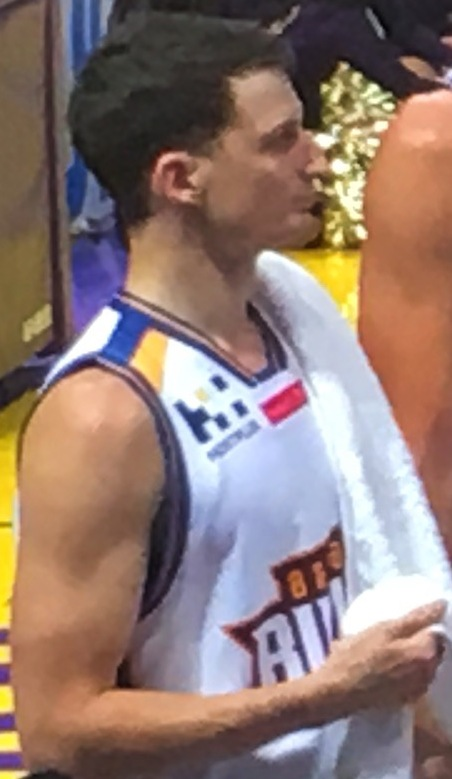
- Bruce with the Brisbane Bullets in 2016

No. 7 – Cairns Taipans
- Position: Guard
- League: NBL

Personal information
- Born: 13 January 1991 (age 35)
- Listed height: 192 cm (6 ft 4 in)
- Listed weight: 87 kg (192 lb)

Career information
- Playing career: 2010–present

Career history
- 2010–2013: Ballarat Miners
- 2012–2016: Cairns Taipans
- 2014–2015: Cairns Marlins
- 2016–2017: Mackay Meteors
- 2016–2018: Brisbane Bullets
- 2018: Wellington Saints
- 2018: Westports Malaysia Dragons
- 2019: Adelaide 36ers
- 2019: Rockhampton Rockets
- 2019–2026: Sydney Kings
- 2021; 2023–2024: Logan Thunder
- 2025: Wellington Saints
- 2026: Logan Thunder
- 2026–present: Cairns Taipans

Career highlights
- 3× NBL champion (2022, 2023, 2026); NZNBL champion (2025); NBL1 North First Team (2026); 2× All-NBL1 North Second Team (2023, 2024); QBL MVP (2017); 3× QBL All-League Team (2014, 2016, 2017); SEABL East Golden Hands Award (2011)

Shaun Andrew Bruce (born 13 January 1991) is an Australian professional basketball player for the Cairns Taipans of the National Basketball League (NBL). He began his NBL career in 2012 with the Taipans, going on to play for the Brisbane Bullets, Adelaide 36ers and Sydney Kings. He helped the Kings win back-to-back NBL championships in 2022 and 2023. He won his third NBL championship with the Kings in 2026. He returned to the Taipans in 2026.

== Early life ==
Bruce hails from Horsham, Victoria. He grew up playing for the Horsham Hornets.

== Basketball career ==
=== NBL ===
In January 2012, Bruce had a training stint with the Melbourne Tigers of the National Basketball League.

Bruce joined the Cairns Taipans as a development player for the 2012–13 NBL season. He subsequently won the inaugural Aron Baynes Award for Most Outstanding Athlete.

In August 2013, Bruce signed a full-time contract with the Taipans for the 2013–14 season. He re-signed with the club for the 2014–15 season in April 2014. On 31 December 2014, he recorded his first double-digit scoring game of his NBL career with 12 points against the Adelaide 36ers. He helped the Taipans reach the 2015 NBL grand final series.

On 19 June 2015, Bruce re-signed with the Taipans for the 2015–16 season. He received more playing time in December 2015 due to injuries to teammates Markel Starks and Stephen Weigh. He had 17 points against the Sydney Kings of 2 January 2016.

On 29 April 2016, Bruce signed a two-year deal with the Brisbane Bullets. On 27 January 2017, he scored a season-high 13 points in an 80–77 loss to Melbourne United. He missed the start of the 2017–18 NBL season with the ankle injury. On 28 October 2017, he scored a season-high 13 points in an 87–85 win over Melbourne United. In 27 games, he averaged 3.0 points, 1.2 rebounds and 1.3 assists per game.

In November 2018, Bruce played one game as a stand-in import for the Westports Malaysia Dragons of the ASEAN Basketball League. In January 2019, he joined the Adelaide 36ers as a replacement for injured import Ramone Moore. In seven games to finish the 2018–19 NBL season, he averaged 2.4 points per game.

On 26 April 2019, Bruce signed with the Sydney Kings for the 2019–20 NBL season. He played a key role off the bench and averaged career highs while stepping up in the absence of the injured Kevin Lisch. On 15 June 2020, Bruce re-signed with the Kings on a two-year deal. In February 2021, he played his 200th NBL game.

In the 2021–22 NBL season, Bruce played his 250th NBL game and helped the Kings win the NBL championship. On 23 May 2022, Bruce re-signed with the Kings on a two-year deal. He helped the Kings win back-to-back championships in 2022–23. In December 2023, Bruce played his 300th NBL game.

On 12 March 2024, Bruce re-signed with the Kings on a two-year deal. On 13 October 2024, he recorded 21 points and four assists while making all six three-point attempts in a 99–76 win over the Cairns Taipans.

In October 2025, Bruce played his 350th NBL game, becoming just the 78th player to do so. He moved to equal third on the Kings all-time games list (191) alongside Tim Morrissey and behind only Matthew Nielsen (244) and Damian Keogh (215). He won his third NBL championship in April 2026.

Bruce parted ways with the Kings following the 2025–26 season. He left ranking first all-time in wins (136), second all-time in games played (219), fourth all-time in assists (524), third all-time in plus-minus (+411), and ninth all-time in three-pointers made (199).

On 9 June 2026, Bruce signed a two-year deal with the Cairns Taipans, returning to the team for the first time since 2016.

=== Australian state leagues and NZNBL ===
In 2010, Bruce joined the Ballarat Miners of the South East Australian Basketball League (SEABL). In 2011, he won the SEABL East Golden Hands Award, which is calculated by adding a player's assists and steals and subtracting their turnovers. He played a third season with the Miners in 2012. With the Miners in 2013, he missed eight games during the season with a torn quadriceps.

Bruce played for the Cairns Marlins of the Queensland Basketball League (QBL) during the 2014 season, earning All-League Team honours. He re-joined the Marlins for the 2015 QBL season.

Bruce joined the Mackay Meteors for the 2016 QBL season. He was named QBL Player of the Week for round six. He averaged 20.1 points, 5.2 rebounds, 6.2 assists and 1.1 steals in 18 games. He was subsequently named to the QBL All-League Team. He re-joined the Meteors for the 2017 QBL season. He recorded two triple-doubles and two Player of the Week awards. He helped the Meteors reach the QBL grand final series, but he injured his ankle in game one and the team lost 2–1 to the Townsville Heat. He was subsequently named the QBL MVP. In 19 games, he averaged 22.6 points, 5.9 rebounds, 9.5 assists and 1.2 steals per game.

Bruce played for the Wellington Saints in the 2018 New Zealand NBL season. In 20 games, he averaged 10.9 points, 4.2 rebounds, 2.5 assists and 1.1 steals per game.

Bruce joined the Rockhampton Rockets for the 2019 QBL season. In 20 games, he averaged 22.0 points, 4.8 rebounds, 9.6 assists and 1.8 steals per game.

Bruce joined the Logan Thunder of the NBL1 North for the 2021 season. He re-joined the Thunder for the 2023 NBL1 North season and earned All-NBL1 North Second Team honours. He re-joined the Thunder for the 2024 NBL1 North season and earned NBL1 North Second Team for the second straight year.

Bruce joined the Wellington Saints on a short-term deal for the start of the 2025 New Zealand NBL season to cover for the absence of Shea Ili. He returned to Australia in mid April but re-joined the Saints in late June to once again cover for Ili following his departure from the team. Bruce went on to help the Saints win the NZNBL championship, scoring 13 points in the 88–83 grand final win over the Southland Sharks.

Bruce joined the Logan Thunder for the 2026 NBL1 North season. On 25 April, he recorded a triple-double with 22 points, 13 assists and 12 rebounds in a 93–83 win over the Brisbane Capitals. On 1 May, he set an NBL1 record with 24 assists in a 103–77 win over the Mackay Meteors. On 5 June, he had 17 points, 13 assists and 10 rebounds in a 117–92 win over the Rockhampton Rockets. On 5 July, he had 30 points, 13 assists and 10 rebounds in a 101–86 win over the Northside Wizards. He finished the regular season as the league's assists per game leader and earned NBL1 North All Star Five First Team honours. For the season, he averaged 19.9 points, 13.3 assists, 6.4 rebounds and 1.3 steals per game.

== Personal life ==
Bruce is the son of Steve and Julie Bruce. His mother was a national-level swimmer, while two of his uncles, Des and Stephen Ryan, played in the Australian Football League (AFL). He also has two older brothers, Aaron and Cameron. Aaron formerly played in the NBL, while Cameron has played many years in the lower level Victorian basketball divisions.

Bruce is close friends with AFL player Jake Lloyd.
