= 1994 AFL Rising Star =

Australian rules football award

1994 Norwich AFL Rising Star
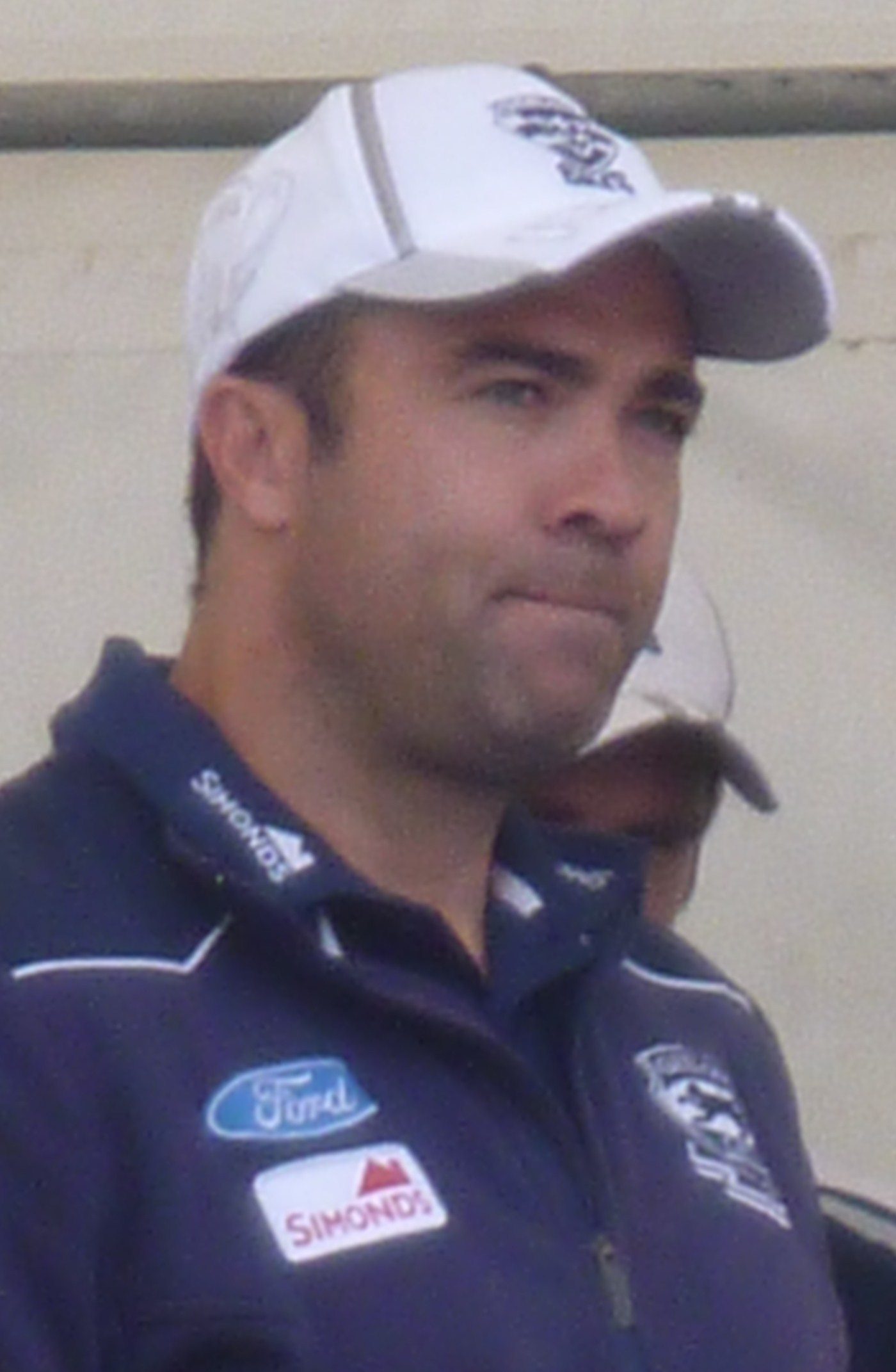
- Chris Scott, winner of the 1994 AFL Rising Star award, during 2011
- Sponsored by: Norwich
- Country: Australia
- Rising Star: Chris Scott (Brisbane Bears)

The Norwich AFL Rising Star award is given annually to a standout young player in the Australian Football League. The 1994 medal was won by Brisbane Bears player Chris Scott.

== Eligibility ==
Every round, an Australian Football League rising star nomination is given to a standout young player. To be eligible for the award, a player must be under 21 on January 1 of that year, have played 10 or fewer senior games and not been suspended during the season. At the end of the year, one of the 22 nominees is the winner of award.

== Nominations ==
Round	Player	Club
1	Che Cockatoo-Collins	Essendon
2	Corey McKernan	North Melbourne
3	John Barker	Fitzroy
4	Brett Spinks	West Coast
5	Jarrod Molloy	Fitzroy
6	James Cook	Carlton
7	Chris Scott	Brisbane Bears
8	Kent Butcher	Collingwood
9	Drew Banfield	West Coast
10	Mark Graham	Hawthorn
11	Matthew Rogers	Richmond
12	Shane Wakelin	St Kilda
13	Simon Hawking	Fitzroy
14	Matthew Clarke	Brisbane Bears
15	Jamie Tape	Richmond
16	Daniel Southern	Footscray
17	Matthew Kluzek	Adelaide
18	Troy Bond	Carlton
19	Scott Cummings	Essendon
20	Rayden Tallis	Hawthorn
21	Chris Johnson	Fitzroy
22	Jon Hassall	Collingwood
23	Sean Wellman	Adelaide
24	Duncan Kellaway	Richmond
Source: AFL Record Season Guide 2015
