= Glenn Gorman =

Australian rules footballer

Personal information
- Full name: Glenn Gorman
- Born: 26 January 1976 (age 50)
- Original teams: Maryborough, Geelong Falcons
- Draft: 4th, 1993 AFL draft 29th, 1995 Pre-season draft
- Height: 187 cm (6 ft 2 in)
- Weight: 82 kg (181 lb)

Playing career^{1}
Years	Club	Games (Goals)
1994	Sydney Swans	0 (0)
1995–1996	North Melbourne	2 (0)
- ^{1} Playing statistics correct to the end of 1996.

Glenn Gorman (born 26 January 1976) is a former Australian rules footballer who played with North Melbourne in the Australian Football League (AFL).

Gorman was selected with one of three top five picks that the Sydney Swans had at their disposal in the 1993 AFL draft, but wouldn't play a senior AFL game for the club.

The former Geelong Falcon then made his way to North Melbourne through the 1995 Pre-season Draft and was a member of their 1995 and 1996 reserves premiership teams.

He made only two appearances in the seniors, both in the 1996 AFL season, which ended with North Melbourne winning the flag. His first game came in North Melbourne's 113-point win over Melbourne on the MCG, remembered for Wayne Carey kicking a career best 11 goals. He appeared again three weeks later, in round 20, against Adelaide at Football Park.

He has since played and coached in Canberra, starting at Ainslie in 1997.

Gorman coached Tuggeranong Hawks Football Club in 2011 and 2012.

== Links ==
- 1997 AFL Canberra Premiers: Ainslie FC team photo
