= Matthew Dent (footballer) =

Australian rules footballer

Personal information
- Born: 17 January 1972 (age 54)
- Original team: Sturt (SANFL)
- Height: 185 cm (6 ft 1 in)
- Weight: 86 kg (190 lb)

Playing career^{1}
Years	Club	Games (Goals)
1994–1996	Fitzroy	47 (9)
1997–2000	Western Bulldogs	63 (10)
2001	Hawthorn	8 (0)
Total		118 (19)
- ^{1} Playing statistics correct to the end of 2001.

Career highlights
- VFL premiership player: 2001; SANFL premiership player: 2002

Matthew Dent (born 17 January 1972) is a former Australian rules footballer who played with Fitzroy, the Western Bulldogs and Hawthorn in the AFL.

Originally from South Australian National Football League (SANFL) club Sturt Dent was drafted by Fitzroy at the 1993 AFL draft and made his senior AFL debut for Fitzroy in 1994, remaining with the club until their last season in the AFL in 1996. Instead of joining the Brisbane Lions, Dent moved to Footscray and played four seasons with the Bulldogs before transferring to Hawthorn in 2001 to finish with a career tally of 118 games.

In 2002 Dent returned to Sturt and was a member of their 2002 premiership team.
