= Cain Liddle =

Australian rules footballer

Personal information
- Full name: Cain Liddle
- Born: 11 June 1975 (age 51)
- Original team: Western Jets (TAC Cup)
- Draft: No. 14, 1994 Pre-season Draft
- Height: 182 cm (6 ft 0 in)
- Weight: 83 kg (183 lb)

Playing career^{1}
Years	Club	Games (Goals)
1994	Geelong	4 (0)
- ^{1} Playing statistics correct to the end of 1994.

Cain Liddle (born 11 June 1975) is a former Australian rules footballer who played for Geelong in the Australian Football League (AFL) in 1994. He was recruited from the Western Jets in the TAC Cup with the 14th selection in the 1994 Pre-season Draft. Liddle is the former chief executive officer of the Carlton Football Club.

== Playing & Coaching career ==
Liddle played under-19s football for North Melbourne and TAC Cup for the Western Jets. He was drafted to the AFL with the 14th selection in the 1994 Pre-season Draft to play for Geelong Football Club. Liddle however only played four games for Geelong in 1994. Liddle was however delisted by Geelong after the 1994 season. After being delisted by Geelong, Liddle was an assistant coach for eight seasons with TAC Cup club the Calder Cannons and also Vic Metro in the national under-18 championships.

== Sports Administration career ==
Liddle completed a Master of Business Administration and also studied for a doctorate of business.

=== Richmond Football Club ===
From 2010 to 2017, Liddle was the chief customer officer for the Richmond Football Club. His duties in that role included "ticketing, retail, licensing and corporate revenues" as well as managing Aligned Leisure, a subsidiary health and recreation business.

=== Carlton Football Club ===
Liddle was appointed CEO of the Carlton Football Club in November 2017. Liddle was able to grow the Blues' financial arm considerably during his tenure and under Liddle's leadership as CEO, the Carlton Football Club cleared historical debt, significantly grew membership and commercial revenues, as well as the introduction of new non-traditional revenues. On 10 September 2021, Liddle parted ways with Carlton after he was sacked from his position as CEO. The club came to this decision, after an extensive review of the club's football operations due to the club's disappointing 2021 AFL season with poor on-field results, where it was determined by the club, that the gaps between on and off-field performance were too large for Liddle to maintain his position as CEO. Liddle was then replaced by Brian Cook as Carlton's CEO.

=== Incrementum Advisory Group ===
Liddle later joined the Incrementum Advisory Group as director, where he consults to some of the country's biggest sports, sporting clubs, universities and LGA's to drive growth for the clients.
