= Che Cockatoo-Collins =

Australian rules footballer (born 1975)

Personal information
- Born: 5 March 1975 (age 51); Brisbane, Queensland
- Original team: Cairns Cities (AFL Cairns)
- Height: 181 cm (5 ft 11 in)
- Weight: 85 kg (187 lb)
- Position: Forward

Playing career^{1}
Years	Club	Games (Goals)
1993, 1999–2003	Port Adelaide (SANFL)	45 (62)
1994–1998	Essendon	85 (109)
1999–2003	Port Adelaide (AFL)	75 (106)
Total		205 (277)

Representative team honours
Years	Team	Games (Goals)
1993	Queensland	1 (0)
1995–1998	Allies	3 (0)
- ^{1} Playing statistics correct to the end of 2003.

Career highlights
- 2× Essendon Football Club pre-season premiership side; AFL Rising Star nominee: 1994

Che Cockatoo-Collins (born 5 March 1975) is a former Australian rules footballer who played in the Australian Football League (AFL).

Cockatoo-Collins was born in Brisbane, Queensland, before moving to Cairns, Queensland, where he began playing junior football with the Cairns City Cobras Australian Football Club. Cockatoo-Collins moved to Adelaide with his family whilst still at school and signed up with the Port Adelaide Magpies in the South Australian National Football League (SANFL) where he became noticed for his skills and pace. Cockatoo-Collins played 25 SANFL games before being drafted by Essendon.

== Essendon career ==
Debuting with AFL club Essendon in 1994 as a 19-year-old, Cockatoo-Collins slowly started to improve his game. He played 16 games in 1994, averaging 16 disposals per game and kicking 24 goals. He did well in the next season, but the 1996 season was to be his break-through year. He played all 24 games that his club played apart from one, kicking 37 goals and picking up 15 disposals a game. His form then dropped off in the next two seasons, eventually being traded to Port Adelaide at the end of the 1998 season.

== Port Adelaide career ==
Cockatoo-Collins proved in his first season at the club (1999) that he was a useful pickup. He played 12 games, kicking 23 goals. The next season, however, was to be a disappointing one for him, only playing two games because of persistent injury troubles. In 2001, he played 22 out of 24 games, kicking 41 goals and averaging 15 disposals in his best season yet. In the next two seasons, he was to kick 40 goals in total, but he was only able to play 16 games in what was to be his last season. At the end of the 2003 season, he was delisted.

=== Retirement ===
Cockatoo-Collins kept on playing for the Port Adelaide Magpies, becoming a solid contributor to the team. He announced his retirement from the SANFL in February 2006. Cockatoo-Collins then played for United in the Adelaide Plains Football League in 2007 and 2008, missing the 2007 grand final.

Cockatoo-Collins had a small role in the 2005 Australian movie Look Both Ways, starring William McInnes and Justine Clarke. He is the man who walks into the editors office at the start and is told to go away. He is seen photocopying in a later scene as well.

== Personal life ==
Cockatoo-Collins's younger twin brothers David and Donald also played for Port Adelaide Football Club and in the AFL for Melbourne. The "Cockatoo" part of his surname derives from his maternal great-great-grandfather in Cape York being known as "Old Man Cockatoo". His nephew Nakia Cockatoo is a former professional footballer who played for the Brisbane Lions.
