= Adrian Burns =

Australian rules footballer

Personal information
- Full name: Adrian Burns
- Born: 5 August 1971 (age 55)
- Original team: Dromana
- Draft: No. 51, 1988 national draft
- Height: 178 cm (5 ft 10 in)
- Weight: 71 kg (157 lb)

Playing career^{1}
Years	Club	Games (Goals)
1990–1991	Essendon	11 (7)
1994	St Kilda	4 (1)
Total		15 (8)
- ^{1} Playing statistics correct to the end of 1994.

Adrian Burns (born 5 August 1971) is a former Australian rules footballer who played with Essendon and St Kilda in the Australian Football League (AFL).

Burns came to Essendon from Dromana, as the 51st selection of the 1988 VFL Draft. He was a member of the Essendon side which won the 1990 Foster's Cup, kicking two goals in the grand final. He made seven regular season appearances for Essendon that year and participated in their semi final loss to Collingwood. His collision with Collingwood's Alan Richardson in that game resulted in Richardson breaking his collarbone, which would cost him a spot in their premiership team.

Burns did not play seniors in the 1992 and 1993 AFL seasons, and made his way to St Kilda in the 1994 Pre-Season Draft, but would make only four appearances that year before his delistment by St Kilda.
