= Daniel Southern =

Australian rules footballer (born 1975)

Personal information
- Full name: Daniel Mark Southern
- Born: 1 January 1975 (age 51)
- Original team: West Coast Junior Football Club
- Debut: Round 1, 1994, Footscray vs. Richmond, at Western Oval
- Height: 188 cm (6 ft 2 in)
- Weight: 92 kg (203 lb)
- Position: Defender

Playing career^{1}
| Years | Club | Games (Goals) |
| 1993 | Claremont (WAFL) | 18 (2) |
| 1994–2000 | Footscray/Western Bulldogs | 103 (28) |
| Total | | 121 (30) |
- ^{1} Playing statistics correct to the end of 2000.

Career highlights
- AFL Rising Star nominee 1994; Larke Medal 1992; Claremont premiership side 1993

Daniel Mark "Danny" Southern (born 1 January 1975) is a former Australian rules footballer who played with the Western Bulldogs in the Australian Football League (AFL).

Southern was a defender and was recruited to the Bulldogs from Claremont in Western Australia. He played 24 games in his debut season in 1994 and polled 12 Brownlow Medal votes in six of those games. Southern brought up his 100th game for the club in 2000 before another in a succession of knee injuries forced him to retire.

Southern studied ecotourism before moving to Egypt in 2004 to work as a tour leader and then ground manager for Intrepid Travel. He converted to Islam in 2005 and married an Egyptian Muslim in 2009. Amidst the chaos of the Egyptian Revolution of 2011, Daniel's wife Reham gave birth to their son Zakaria Daniel Mark Southern.

The family returned to Australia in 2013, Southern taking up a position with the Clontarf Foundation, which helps young Aboriginal and Torres Strait Islander men.
