= Shane Tongerie =

Australian rules footballer

Personal information
- Full name: Shane Tongerie
- Born: 10 February 1971 (age 55)
- Original team: Central District (SANFL)
- Draft: 18th, 1994 Pre-Season Draft
- Height: 184 cm (6 ft 0 in)
- Weight: 83 kg (183 lb)

Playing career^{1}
| Years | Club | Games (Goals) |
| 1994 | Adelaide | 4 (3) |
- ^{1} Playing statistics correct to the end of 1994.

Shane Tongerie (born 10 February 1971) is a former Australian rules footballer who played with Adelaide in the Australian Football League (AFL).

Tongerie played for Central District in the South Australian National Football League (SANFL) before being selected by Adelaide with the 18th pick of the 1994 Pre-Season Draft. He kicked three goals on debut, against the Brisbane Bears at the Gabba, after coming off the bench. However, in his next three games Tongerie had a combined total of just 11 disposals and lost his place in the side.

An Indigenous Australian, Tongerie was a member of the Aboriginal All-Stars team which defeated Collingwood by 20 points at Marrara Oval in Darwin in 1994.
