= Craig Biddiscombe =

Australian rules footballer

Personal information
- Full name: Craig Biddiscombe
- Born: 21 September 1976 (age 50)
- Original team: Gippsland Power
- Draft: 59th, 1993 National Draft
- Height: 185 cm (6 ft 1 in)
- Weight: 84 kg (185 lb)

Playing career^{1}
Years	Club	Games (Goals)
1995–1998	Geelong	34 (6)
1999–2003	Richmond	44 (7)
Total		78 (13)
- ^{1} Playing statistics correct to the end of 2003.

Career highlights
- AFL Rising Star nominee: 1996

Craig Biddiscombe (born 21 September 1976), a former Australian-rules footballer, played with Geelong and Richmond in the Australian Football League (AFL).

Biddiscombe came to Geelong from Traralgon and was drafted from the Gippsland Power. He went at pick 59 in the 1993 National Draft; Geelong utilised him as a midfielder.

In 1995, his debut season, Biddiscombe made two appearances, in rounds 20 and 21, but didn't take part in Geelong's finals campaign. The following year he earned a Rising Star nomination for his performance against Fitzroy at Western Oval in his seventh league game. He was never able to cement his spot in the Geelong side and after the 1998 AFL season was traded to Richmond. In order to secure his services, Richmond gave Geelong pick eight in the 1998 National Draft, which was on-traded to the Sydney Swans, who used it to select Jude Bolton.

Biddiscombe's first season at Richmond was ruined by hamstring injuries: he managed just four senior appearances. In 2000 however, he played 19 of a possible 22 games, as a half-back, and won Richmond's "Best Clubman" award. He appeared in the first 10 rounds of the 2001 season but then injured his knee and didn't feature again for the rest of the year. The rest of his time with Richmond was spent mostly in the reserves; he was delisted at the end of 2003.

In 2004 and 2005, Biddiscombe played for North Ballarat. He then joined South Barwon in 2006 and was a member of their premiership team that year, and again in 2007.

Biddiscombe is also a cricketer: he has played for the Barwon Heads cricket club in the Bellarine Peninsula cricket association since 1996. During his time he has won 5 A grade premierships (2005/2006, 2007-2008, 2008–2009, 2010-2011 and 2013–2014). Biddiscombe's natural leadership and professionalism play a big part of the success behind the club in recent years. Biddiscombe also took on the club coach role in the 2013/14 season. He played a season with St Josephs cricket club in 2017/18 in the Geelong Cricket Association (GCA) and now calls North Geelong Cricket Club home—he became co-coach in 2020/21.

Craig's coaching record speaks for itself as he is now a 5 time premiership coach as his Magpies have won 7 Premierships in a row in the Victorian Cricket competition outside of Premier Cricket. The coach will be etched in North Geelong's history after he took over from successful coach Jack Hall. The clubs fitness improved incredibly after he came on board as he brought in a damaging loop course of St Helens Hill that he likes to call "Bidders Loop".

Biddiscombe now runs and owns Elite Team Dynamics.
