= Mark Hepburn =

Australian rules footballer

Personal information
- Full name: Mark Steven Hepburn
- Born: 29 August 1968 (age 58)
- Original team: Claremont (WAFL)
- Height: 195 cm (6 ft 5 in)
- Weight: 95 kg (209 lb)

Playing career^{1}
Years	Club	Games (Goals)
1987–1990	North Melbourne	56 (29)
1991–1992	West Coast	13 (0)
1994	Sydney	7 (3)
Total		76 (32)
- ^{1} Playing statistics correct to the end of 1994.

Mark Steven Hepburn (born 29 August 1968) is a former Australian rules footballer who played with North Melbourne, the West Coast Eagles and the Sydney Swans in the Victorian/Australian Football League (VFL/AFL).

North Melbourne recruited Hepburn from Claremont and he was used initially as a forward in the VFL. He kicked a goal with his first kick in league football, against St Kilda at Moorabbin Oval. Hepburn, who could also play as a key defender, was North Melbourne's leading ruckman in the 1989 and 1990 seasons, with the most hit-outs each year.

He requested a trade to West Coast in 1991 but spent just two seasons with his new club before being delisted when they had to trim their squad. After a year spent traveling overseas, Hepburn was picked up by Sydney with selection 57 in the 1993 AFL draft but would only make seven appearances.
