= Robert Stevenson (Australian footballer) =

Australian rules footballer

Personal information
- Full name: Robert Stevenson
- Born: 14 June 1976 (age 50)
- Original teams: Taylors Lakes (EDFL); Western Jets (TAC)
- Draft: 19th, 1993 AFL draft
- Height: 188 cm (6 ft 2 in)
- Weight: 82 kg (181 lb)
- Position: Defender

Playing career^{1}
Years	Club	Games (Goals)
1994–1997	Essendon	11 (0)
1998	Western Bulldogs	0 (0)
- ^{1} Playing statistics correct to the end of 1997.

Robert Stevenson (born 14 June 1976) is a former Australian rules footballer who played with Essendon in the Australian Football League (AFL).

A key defender, Stevenson was just 17 when he debuted in the opening round of the 1994 AFL season. The Western Jets recruit made a total of six appearances that year and was also a member of the Essendon team which won the 1994 Foster's Cup. He didn't feature in the 1995 and 1996 seasons and it was not until round 18 of the 1997 season that he got another chance in the seniors.

He nominated for the 1997 AFL draft and was picked up by the Western Bulldogs with the 47th selection. They were hoping he could play as a fullback but he didn't end up playing an AFL game for them.
