= Alister Carr =

Australian rules footballer

Personal information
- Full name: Alister Carr
- Born: 3 May 1973 (age 53)
- Original teams: South Bendigo, (BFL)
- Draft: 1. 26, 1989 VFL Draft, Essendon; #39, 1994 Preseason Draft, St Kilda

Playing career^{1}
Years	Club	Games (Goals)
1994	St Kilda	4 (1)
- ^{1} Playing statistics correct to the end of 1994.

Alister Carr (born 3 May 1973) is a former Australian rules footballer who played for St Kilda in the Australian Football League (AFL) in 1994. He was recruited from the South Bendigo Football Club in the Bendigo Football League (BFL) to Essendon with the 26th selection in the 1989 VFL Draft. He spent four years at Essendon without playing senior football, before being selected by St Kilda with the last selection in the 1994 Preseason Draft.

In 1994 Carr lived with James Hird and was the best man at his wedding.
