= Jason Watts =

Australian rules footballer

Personal information
- Full name: Jason Watts
- Born: 29 July 1971 (age 55)
- Original team: St Albans (FDFL) / Werribee
- Draft: 12th, 1994 Pre-Season Draft
- Height: 185 cm (6 ft 1 in)
- Weight: 80 kg (176 lb)

Playing career^{1}
Years	Club	Games (Goals)
1994–1998	Footscray/Western Bulldogs	57 (51)
- ^{1} Playing statistics correct to the end of 1998.

Jason Watts (born 29 July 1971) is a former Australian rules footballer who played with Footscray in the Victorian Football League (VFL).

Watts was recruited by Footscray on the back of his strong 1993 season at Werribee, when he won their best and fairest award in a premiership year. Picked up in the 1994 Pre-Season Draft, Watts appeared in 21 games for Footscray, including a qualifying final, in his first year at the club. He played as a small forward in 1996 and was the leading goal-kicker for the Bulldogs, with 44 goals from his 20 games. Over the next two years he added only five more games to his tally.
