= Cristian O'Brien =

Australian rules footballer

Personal information
- Full name: Cristian O'Brien
- Born: 15 January 1974 (age 52)
- Original team: Mordialloc-Braeside (CDJFL)
- Draft: No. 21, 1993 Mid-Season Draft
- Height: 184 cm (6 ft 0 in)
- Weight: 90 kg (198 lb)

Playing career^{1}
Years	Club	Games (Goals)
1993 & 1997–1999	Norwood	52 (91)
1994–1995	Geelong	2 (0)
Total		54 (91)
- ^{1} Playing statistics correct to the end of 1999.

Cristian O'Brien (born 15 January 1974) is a former Australian rules footballer who played with Geelong in the Australian Football League (AFL) and Norwood in the South Australian National Football League (SANFL).

O'Brien played his junior football for Mordialloc-Braeside in the Chelsea District JFL, from where he was drafted by Melbourne. A forward, he appeared for Melbourne at under-19s and reserves level, but didn't play a senior AFL game. He moved to SANFL club Norwood in 1993, where his good form led to Geelong selecting him in the Mid-Season Draft. Geelong made the grand final in each of his two senior seasons, 1994 and 1995. He appeared once each year, in round 11 of the 1994 AFL season against the Brisbane Bears and the opening round of the 1995 AFL season against Melbourne, both at Kardinia Park.
