= Adam Heuskes =

Australian rules footballer (born 1976)

Personal information
- Full name: Adam Heuskes
- Born: 20 March 1976 (age 50); Boronia, Victoria
- Original team: Norwood (SANFL)
- Draft: 5th overall, 1993 National Draft; Sydney; Zone Selection, 1996 Draft; Port Adelaide
- Height: 190 cm (6 ft 3 in)
- Weight: 93 kg (205 lb)

Playing career^{1}
Years	Club	Games (Goals)
1994–1996	Sydney	49 (6)
1997–1998	Port Adelaide	37 (1)
1999–2000	Brisbane Lions	39 (5)
Total		125 (12)
- ^{1} Playing statistics correct to the end of 2000.

Adam Heuskes (born 20 March 1976) is a former Australian rules footballer in the Australian Football League most remembered for his on field flamboyance and controversial off-field behaviour, which twice resulted in rape allegations.

Recruited from South Australian National Football League (SANFL) club Norwood, Heuskes made his AFL debut in 1994 with the Sydney Swans and immediately attracted attention in the media and the football world for his outrageous hairstylings.

He was traded to Port Adelaide Football Club in 1997, a decision which the Swans later regretted, as Heuskes earned All-Australian selection later that year. Heuskes' attacking flair as a defender set up numerous goals.

For the 1999 AFL season, Heuskes was traded to the Brisbane Lions, where he was a solid contributor during the Lions' 1999 finals campaign. He retired suddenly at age 24 towards the end of 2000, having lost the motivation to play at the full time professional level; then-coach Leigh Matthews commented that he simply walked out on the club after his final match without attending the next recovery session.

Heuskes later played 31 games for SANFL club North Adelaide before succumbing to an ankle injury in 2005 which forced his retirement from all forms of the game.

Heuskes has a daughter, Tayla, born in 1994, and is married to Nikki Kosmider.

== Off-field behaviour and controversy ==
Heuskes has gained notoriety for incidents involving alcohol, and an inability to maintain self-control. He has twice been accused of raping young women in front of, or with, teammates. Police have been involved in both of these cases, and one woman claims she was paid for her silence. Both women later spoke out in a Four Corners program about sexual assault in AFL

Also known for his flamboyant style, two notable haircuts included the image of the Sydney Opera House shaved into the back of his head, as well as his guernsey number (39). He was also a cross-dresser who appeared on televisions' The Footy Show and Live and Kicking regularly during 1998 and 1999. He once dressed up as Madonna and performed the song Holiday.

== Statistics ==
Legend
G	Goals	K	Kicks	D	Disposals	T	Tackles
B	Behinds	H	Handballs	M	Marks

Season	Team	No.	Games	Totals							Averages (per game)							Votes
Season	Team	No.	Games	G	B	K	H	D	M	T	G	B	K	H	D	M	T	Votes
1994	Sydney	39	10	1	1	76	61	137	22	19	0.1	0.1	7.6	6.1	13.7	2.2	1.9	0
1995	Sydney	39	17	2	2	133	112	245	51	20	0.1	0.1	7.8	6.6	14.4	3.0	1.2	0
1996	Sydney	39	22	3	0	242	123	365	88	23	0.1	0.0	11.0	5.6	16.6	4.0	1.0	1
1997	Port Adelaide	39	22	0	0	284	137	421	95	32	0.0	0.0	12.9	6.2	19.1	4.3	1.5	4
1998	Port Adelaide	39	15	1	2	150	90	240	66	14	0.1	0.1	10.0	6.0	16.0	4.4	0.9	2
1999	Brisbane Lions	31	25	1	1	299	143	442	151	24	0.0	0.0	12.0	5.7	17.7	6.0	1.0	5
2000	Brisbane Lions	31	14	4	1	155	71	226	81	10	0.3	0.1	11.1	5.1	15.1	5.8	0.7	0
Career			125	12	7	1339	737	2076	554	142	0.1	0.1	10.7	5.9	16.6	4.4	1.1	12
