= Graeme John =

Australian rules footballer (1943–2023)

Personal information
- Full name: Graeme Thomas John
- Born: 15 March 1943
- Died: 27 June 2023 (aged 80)
- Original team: East Perth
- Height: 188 cm (6 ft 2 in)
- Weight: 85 kg (187 lb)

Playing career^{1}
Years	Club	Games (Goals)
1959–63	East Perth	67 (47)
1964–69	South Melbourne	77 (97)

Coaching career
Years	Club	Games (W–L–D)
1973–75	South Melbourne	66 (15–50–1)
- ^{1} Playing statistics correct to the end of 1975.

Graeme Thomas John (15 March 1943 – 27 June 2023) was an Australian businessman and rules footballer who was the managing director of Australia Post from 1993 to 2009. From 1990 he was Australia Post's Chief Manager of National Operations. John was awarded the Officer of the Order of Australia (AO) in 2003, for service to business and to the community. He was also a recipient of the Centennial Medal and the Australian Sports Medal. He was a fellow of the Chartered Institute of Logistics and Transport and a member of the Australian Institute of Company Directors. He served as a board member of Aurizon, Racing Victoria and Seven West Media.

John was a chairman of the board of the Kahala Posts Group, board member of the International Post Corporation (Netherlands), and vice-chairman of Sai Cheng Logistics International (China), a joint venture with China Post.

John played for, and later coached, the South Melbourne Football Club in the Victorian Football League. He played at centre-half-forward for both the Western Australian and Victorian state teams and gained selection in the All-Australian team in 1966. He was nominated for the Swans "Team of The Century". Off the field John also served as president of the South Melbourne Football Club and served as an Australian Football League commissioner until 2011.

Graeme John had three children; Rebecca, Andrea, and Gareth, a ruckman who played for the Sydney Swans. He died on 27 June 2023, at the age of 80.
