= Gareth John =

Australian rules footballer

Personal information
- Full name: Gareth John
- Born: 17 January 1972 (age 54)
- Original team: Gisborne (BFL)
- Draft: No. 106 (F/S), 1988 national draft
- Height: 202 cm (6 ft 8 in)
- Weight: 105 kg (231 lb)
- Position: Ruck

Playing career^{1}
Years	Club	Games (Goals)
1990–1993	Sydney Swans	21 (3)
1994	North Melbourne	1 (0)
Total		22 (3)
- ^{1} Playing statistics correct to the end of 1994.

Gareth John (born 17 January 1972) is a former Australian rules footballer who played with the Sydney Swans and North Melbourne in the Australian Football League (AFL).

The son of champion South Melbourne player and coach Graeme John, John originally played for Gisborne Football Club in the Bendigo Football League and was the leading ruckman for the Victorian and Victorian Country premiership teams in the 1988 and 1989 Teal Cup Carnivals. As a result, John was drafted by Sydney in the 1988 VFL Draft under the father–son rule.

John started the 1990 AFL season in the Under 19s competition but due to an extensive injury list, made his senior debut in Round 10, against Essendon Football Club. Playing against the far more experienced ruck duo of Simon Madden and Paul Salmon, John broke his hand in the second quarter but played out the remainder of the match. The injury would sideline him for three weeks.

With the Swans unable to field any supporting ruckmen on his return, many opposition teams adopted the tactic of rotating two players against John in an attempt to shut him down. His first season finished prematurely, when in round 19, he broke his foot in the second quarter against Melbourne, but again played until the final siren.

John played seven games in his first year, finishing the season with the most hit-outs by a Sydney player and the equal most Brownlow votes.

John started 1991 as Sydney's number one ruckman but injury would again end his season early. Playing against Essendon at the Sydney Cricket Ground, John had his larynx crushed in a ruck duel with Simon Madden and almost died. Remarkably the young player walked off the field with blood pouring from his mouth, when the Swans medical team could not locate their stretcher. He was rushed by ambulance to St Vincent's Hospital and given an emergency tracheotomy in order to save his life. A degree of controversy over the incident would later surface with questions asked over the style of ruck play that was considered safe at centre bounces. The following season the AFL introduced new rules for ruck play at centre bounces.

It was thought the injury would end John's career. However, during an interview with Bruce McAvaney later in the year, John announced he would continue to play for Sydney. The interview also discussed his recent baptism and confirmation and his struggles to regain fitness after a series of operations to his throat.

In 1992 and although he was named in the best players a number of times, injuries would only allow him to play six games. He fractured his ankle in the third quarter of a tough fought match against Collingwood in round 18, but in an incredible display of courage he once again played until the final siren - adding serious credibility to the TV commentators who said he was "obviously playing hurt". After the game it was revealed all players on the Swans interchange bench had also sustained injuries earlier in the match and had been ruled out of play by the club physician. John opted to play on, in an effort to try to help his team win.

He made another four appearances in 1993 but this time it was a lower back injury that ended his year. He was then picked up by North Melbourne with selection 63 in the 1993 AFL draft and suffered a dislocated shoulder early in the season which ultimately resulted in his retirement from the game at only 22yrs of age. During his time in AFL, he played in one winning side, over a 22-game career.

John was featured on Channel 7's "Where Are They Now" TV show in 2009, where it was revealed his lobbying to make ruck play safer for younger players. Much of the interview also centered on his considerable dedication to charity work through organisations such as the Golden Stave, where he served as a committee member, and through his own fundraising initiatives for children's charities and various worthy causes.
