= Justin Staritski =

Australian rules footballer

Personal information
- Full name: Justin Staritski
- Born: 10 July 1970 (age 56)
- Original team: Norwood
- Draft: No. 88, 1988 national draft
- Height: 181 cm (5 ft 11 in)
- Weight: 78 kg (172 lb)

Playing career^{1}
Years	Club	Games (Goals)
1991–1993	North Melbourne	25 (4)
1994	Collingwood	1 (0)
Total		26 (4)
- ^{1} Playing statistics correct to the end of 1994.

Justin Staritski (born 10 July 1970) is a former Australian rules footballer who played with North Melbourne and Collingwood in the Australian Football League (AFL).

A midfielder, Staritski was recruited from Norwood in the South Australian National Football League. He was drafted before the 1989 VFL season but didn't play his first senior game until 1991. He averaged 16 disposals from his 16 games for North Melbourne that year. The following season he appeared nine times and then didn't play a league game in 1993. Collingwood selected him in the 1994 Pre-Season Draft, with pick 37, but he would only play once for his new club.

Staritski has been involved in amateur football after leaving the AFL. He played briefly with the University Blues and as of 2018 is the coach of South Australian Amateur Football League club the Glenunga Rams.
