= Kristian Bardsley =

Australian rules footballer and coach (born 1972)

Personal information
- Born: 13 September 1972 (age 54)
- Original team: Scoresby
- Height: 172 cm (5 ft 8 in)
- Weight: 77 kg (170 lb)

Playing career^{1}
Years	Club	Games (Goals)
1992–1993	North Melbourne	5 (4)
1994–1998	St Kilda	53 (18)
Total		58 (22)
- ^{1} Playing statistics correct to the end of 1998.

Kristian Bardsley (born 13 September 1972) is a former Australian rules football player.

== Name ==
Bardsley began his sporting career known as Kristian Anning, changing his name after transferring from North Melbourne to St Kilda.

== Playing career ==
Bardsley joined North Melbourne before the 1992 AFL season, making his debut against Richmond in Round 2. He played three matches for the Kangaroos for the season. He had to wait until Round 16 of the 1993 AFL season to play again, the first of two matches for the season. At the end of the season he was delisted by North Melbourne.

Bardsley was selection number 34 in the 1994 AFL Pre-season draft by St Kilda. He found success early with the Saints, playing 15 matches during the 1994 AFL season. He followed this up in 1995 with 16 games and 18 in 1996.

During a match in 1996 against Geelong Bardsley was struck by Gary Ablett on the jaw, leaving a wound that required 18 stitches. Despite the severity of the injury, Bardsley returned to action two weeks later.

Due to injury and form he was only able to play three matches in 1997 and one match in 1998 before being delisted at the end of the season.

In 1999 he played for Springvale in the Victorian Football League. He played in their premiership-winning team, however he was knocked unconscious early in the grand final.

He later played four seasons while coaching Scoresby before retiring in 2006.

== Coaching career ==
From 2003 to 2022, Bardsley coached Scoresby in the Eastern Football League, winning the Division Two premiership in 2006.
