= Simon Garlick =

Australian rules footballer and football administrator

Personal information
- Full name: Simon Garlick
- Born: 10 April 1975 (age 51)
- Original team: Glen Waverley Rovers / Central U/18
- Height: 177 cm (5 ft 10 in)
- Weight: 79 kg (174 lb)
- Position: Forward

Playing career^{1}
Years	Club	Games (Goals)
1994–1997	Sydney	44 (27)
1998–2004	Western Bulldogs	137 (114)
Total		181 (141)
- ^{1} Playing statistics correct to the end of 2004.

Simon Garlick (born 10 April 1975) is a former Australian rules footballer who played between 1994 and 2004, and current football administrator.

Drafted to Sydney Swans with the 49th selection in the 1993 AFL draft, he spent his first four years of league football with Sydney, before moving over to the Western Bulldogs. He played over 100 games for the Bulldogs before announcing his retirement during the 2004 season.

In December 2010, Garlick was appointed CEO of the Western Bulldogs and maintained that position for four years. He then was CEO of Bastion EBA (now Bastion Experience) until being appointed CEO of the Fremantle Football Club in October 2019.
