= Adam Slater =

Australian rules footballer

Personal information
- Full name: Adam Slater
- Born: 29 October 1973 (age 53); Burwood, Victoria
- Original team: East Burwood
- Height: 200 cm (6 ft 7 in)
- Weight: 101 kg (223 lb)
- Position: Ruckman/Full Back/Full Forward

Playing career^{1}
| Years | Club | Games (Goals) |
| 1993–1995 | Richmond | 3 (1) |
| 1992–1995 | Richmond (Reserves) | 73 (50) |
| 1990–1991 | Richmond (U19's) | 18 (14) |
| 1996–1999 | Box Hill | 65 (56) |
| 2000–2006 | East Burwood | 124 (?) |
| 2007–2009 | Knox | 36 (120) |
| 2010–2011 | Forest Hill | 27 (88) |
- ^{1} Playing statistics correct to the end of 2011.

Adam Slater (born 29 October 1973) is a former Australian rules footballer who played with Richmond in the Australian Football League (AFL).

Slater, a ruckman, went to Richmond in 1992 from East Burwood. He played in the opening round of the 1993 AFL season against Adelaide, then didn't appear again until 1995, when he played in rounds 21 and 22 against Collingwood and Adelaide respectively.

Slater, was delisted from Richmond at the end of 1995, moving to Box Hill Football Club in the Victorian Football Association for the beginning of the 1996 season. Slater played four seasons at Box Hill, winning the Best & Fairest in his final season in 1999.

In 2000, Slater moved back to his junior club East Burwood and was a member of their premiership team that year, when they defeated Vermont at Waverley Park in the grand final. He won the Best & Fairest at East Burwood four times (2000, 2001, 2002 & 2005) and was made a life member of the club in 2006. In 2005, Slater finished 3rd on the Trophy Town Goal Kickers list kicking 59 goals.

Slater was named at number 10 in the EFL top 10 players of the last 15 years (2000–2015). https://www.efnl.org.au/efl-s-top-10-players
