= Brett Spinks =

Australian rules footballer

Personal information
- Full name: Brett Spinks
- Born: 7 November 1973 (age 52)
- Original team: South Fremantle
- Draft: 79th, 1992 AFL draft
- Height: 194 cm (6 ft 4 in)
- Weight: 110 kg (243 lb)

Playing career^{1}
Years	Club	Games (Goals)
1994–1997	West Coast	21 (14)
1998	Geelong	19 (35)
Total		40 (49)
- ^{1} Playing statistics correct to the end of 1998.

Career highlights
- AFL Rising Star nominee: 1994; Geelong leading goalkicker: 1998

Brett Spinks (born 7 November 1973) is a former Australian rules footballer who played with the West Coast Eagles and Geelong in the Australian Football League (AFL) during the 1990s.

Spinks, who spent an entire season with South Fremantle after being drafted, made his AFL debut in 1994. He played 14 games in the home and away season as well as a qualifying final. For his performance against Fitzroy early in the season, which included 10 marks, he received a 1994 AFL Rising Star nomination. A heavily built key forward, he could only manage a further six games in his next three seasons but topped Perth's goal-kicking in 1997. At the end of the 1997 season he was traded to Geelong for Pick 13, which West Coast used to select Callum Chambers.

He started well at Geelong in 1998, kicking 17 goals in his first four games, including a bag of six goals against Hawthorn at Kardinia Park. His eventual season tally of 35 goals were enough to share the club's goal-kicking honours with Ronnie Burns. Injuries kept him out of the seniors in 1999 and he wasn't able to work his way back into the AFL.
