= Julian Kirzner =

Australian rules footballer

Personal information
- Full name: Julian Kirzner
- Born: 24 October 1976 (age 50); St Vincent's Private Hospital, Melbourne
- Draft: 36th overall, 1993 AFL draft (Essendon)
- Height: 188 cm (6 ft 2 in)
- Weight: 90 kg (198 lb)
- Position: Forward

Playing career^{1}
Years	Club	Games (Goals)
1994–1995	Essendon	1 (1)
1996	Carlton	0 (0)
1997–1998	North Melbourne	3 (5)
Total		4 (6)
- ^{1} Playing statistics correct to the end of 1997.

Julian Kirzner (born 24 October 1976) is a former Australian rules footballer for the Essendon Football Club and North Melbourne Football Club in the Australian Football League (AFL).

== Family ==
The son of Charles Kirzner, and Janine Kirzner (1950-2012), née Posiunas, Julian Kirzner was born at St Vincent's Private Hospital, Melbourne on 24 October 1976.

== Football ==
He played one match for the Essendon Football Club, and three matches for Kangaroos Football Club. He scored six goals in four AFL matches at full-forward.

He is one of the few Jewish players to have played Australian rules football at the highest level.

== See also ==
- List of select Jewish Australian Rules footballers
