= Clinton Shaw =

Australian rules footballer

Personal information
- Full name: Clinton Shaw
- Born: 5 May 1976 (age 50)
- Original team: Southern Stingrays (TAC Cup)
- Draft: No. 25, 1993 AFL draft

Playing career^{1}
Years	Club	Games (Goals)
1994	St Kilda	6 (0)
- ^{1} Playing statistics correct to the end of 1994.

Clinton Shaw (born 5 May 1976) is a former Australian rules footballer who played for St Kilda in the Australian Football League (AFL) in 1994. He was recruited from the Southern Stingrays in the TAC Cup with the 25th selection in the 1993 AFL draft.

After his delisting from St Kilda, Shaw joined South Australian National Football League (SANFL) Woodville-West Torrens.
