= Des Ryan =

Australian rules footballer

Personal information
- Full name: Des Ryan
- Born: 6 October 1967 (age 59)
- Original team: Birchip
- Height: 192 cm (6 ft 4 in)
- Weight: 90 kg (198 lb)
- Position: Fullback / Utility

Playing career^{1}
| Years | Club | Games (Goals) |
| 1986–92 | Richmond | 56 (29) |
- ^{1} Playing statistics correct to the end of 1992.

Des Ryan (born 6 October 1967) is a former Australian rules footballer who played with Richmond in the Victorian Football League (VFL). He is the brother of fellow former Richmond player Stephen Ryan and the uncle of NBL players Aaron and Shaun Bruce. In 2016 Des took over the senior coaching role at Cheltenham FNC in the SFNL. Coaching the senior team to the 2019 Grand Final.
