= Damien Gaspar =

Australian rules footballer

Personal information
- Full name: Damien Gaspar
- Born: 28 March 1975 (age 51)
- Original teams: South Fremantle, (WAFL)

Playing career^{1}
Years	Club	Games (Goals)
1993–1998	Melbourne	29 (0)
- ^{1} Playing statistics correct to the end of 1998.

Damien Gaspar (born 28 March 1975) is a former Australian rules footballer who played with Melbourne in the Australian Football League (AFL).

Melbourne selected Gaspar in the 1992 AFL draft from South Fremantle in the West Australian Football League (WAFL) with the 86th overall selection. He made his debut in 1995 and played in eight games for Melbourne in each of his first two seasons. He played the first twelve games of 1997, but then succumbed to a groin injury and only played one more AFL game in 1998 before he was delisted at the end of the 1998 season.

He returned to Western Australia, but switched WAFL clubs to play for East Fremantle, where he played 110 games over the next seven seasons. He remained at East Fremantle after retiring as a player, becoming their football manager.

His brother, Darren Gaspar, played in the AFL for Sydney and Richmond. It was suggested that Melbourne was considering recruiting Darren when he left Sydney in 1995, but they selected Craig Nettelbeck with the second selection in the 1996 Pre-season Draft, leaving Richmond to select Darren with the next selection. Another brother, Travis Gaspar, played for South Fremantle and West Coast.
