= Peter Green (footballer) =

Australian rules footballer

Personal information
- Full name: Peter Green
- Born: 3 May 1974 (age 52)
- Original team: Barellan (NRFL)
- Draft: 35th overall, 1994 Pre-Season Draft
- Height: 186 cm (6 ft 1 in)
- Weight: 86 kg (190 lb)
- Position: Defender

Playing career^{1}
Years	Club	Games (Goals)
1994	Carlton	1 (0)
- ^{1} Playing statistics correct to the end of 1994.

Peter Green (born 3 May 1974) is a former Australian rules footballer who played with Carlton in the Australian Football League (AFL).
