= Matthew Kluzek =

Australian rules footballer

Personal information
- Full name: Matthew Kluzek
- Born: 3 April 1973 (age 53)
- Original team: Woodville-West Torrens
- Draft: 31st, 1994 Pre-Season draft
- Height: 187 cm (6 ft 2 in)
- Weight: 88 kg (194 lb)

Playing career^{1}
Years	Club	Games (Goals)
1994–1996	Adelaide	24 (15)
- ^{1} Playing statistics correct to the end of 1996.

Career highlights
- AFL Rising Star nominee: 1994

Matthew Kluzek (born 3 April 1973) is a former professional Australian rules footballer who played with the Adelaide Football Club in the Australian Football League (AFL).

Kluzek came to the Adelaide Football Club from the 1994 Pre-Season draft, having previously been drafted by Melbourne. He was used a small forward and earned a nomination for the 1994 AFL Rising Star award after kicking five goals in Adelaide's round 17 win over the West Coast Eagles at Football Park. Kluzek played 13 games in the 1995 AFL season but appeared just four times in 1996.

A premiership player with Woodville-West Torrens, Kluzek made a total of 185 SANFL appearances.

Kluzek coached Scotch Old Collegians in the South Australian Amateur Football League from 2002 to 2004 and returned to the club as coach for the 2011 season.
