= Haydn Robins =

Australian rules footballer

Personal information
- Full name: Haydn Robins
- Born: 9 August 1972 (age 54)
- Original team: Ringwood
- Height: 184 cm (6 ft 0 in)
- Weight: 80 kg (176 lb)

Playing career^{1}
Years	Club	Games (Goals)
1992–1993	Melbourne	20 (1)
1994	Richmond	4 (1)
Total		24 (2)
- ^{1} Playing statistics correct to the end of 1994.

Haydn Robins (born 9 August 1972) is a former Australian rules footballer who played with Melbourne and Richmond in the Australian Football League (AFL).

After winning the Melbourne reserves best and fairest award in 1991, the Ringwood recruit broke into the Melbourne seniors for the first time in round nine of the 1992 AFL season. He made a total of 20 appearances for Melbourne over two seasons, then made his way to Richmond, via the 1994 Pre-Season Draft. (Robins had been slated to be traded in October 1993.) A defender, he played just four senior games for Richmond.

In 1995 Robins played for Woodville-West Torrens in the South Australian National Football League (SANFL) before returning to Victoria to play for Victorian Football League (VFL) club Sandringham, Ringwood and Somerville. He joined Beaconsfield Football Club in 2009, moving from the back pocket to full forward, kicking over 100 goals in his first year at the club, which led Beaconsfield to win their first premiership in 20 years. An exponent of the speccy, and with his greased back hair and gloves, Robins became the most watched player in the competition.

Robins played in three more premierships with the club and kick over 100 goals one more time. He coached Beaconsfield in 2006 and 2007, but he couldn't replicate his on-field success as a coach.

Robins coached Paynesville in the East Gippsland Football League (EGFL) in 2009 and 2010.

== Before the AFL tribunal ==
=== As the injured party ===
The match on June 28, 1992 - Robins' sixth week in the league - opened with him having been thrown to the ground before play could even begin by opposing player Richard Osborne. The report of Osborne's misconduct had been made by boundary umpire Justin Delaney, who testified at Osborne's trial that the 28-year-old grabbed Robins from behind in a headlock. The tribunal sustained the charge, resulting in Osborne receiving the first suspension for on-field wrestling after the AFL sent a memo to all league teams outlining the consequences of engaging in such activity.

=== As the offender ===
One month later, Robins received his first suspension after striking Stevan Jackson of Richmond with his fist during the match in retaliation for actions against one of his teammates. The blow resulted in Jackson being taken to the hospital for treatment of torn ligaments and possibly a broken arm, requiring the Richmond player to be sidelined for three weeks.

On April 14, 1993, Robins faced a charge in the league for "allegedly striking Brisbane rover David Bain". The charge was brought by league investigator Max Croxford. He pleaded guilty to striking Bain in the head with his forearm prior to the game the previous Sunday. He began a two-week suspension on April 17, 1993.

== After football ==
From 1998 through 2013, Robins was the general manager of the Victoria YMCA. In October 2013, he succeeded Peter Schwartz as the CEO of the YMCA of South Australia. During his time there, he began a fundraising initiative, "The Adventures of Tin-Tin", which was an effort to raise funds for local junior sports clubs to help them offset costs either for equipment of fees for joining the team. He also instituted "reciprocal rights" across the South Australian Y locations, allowing residents to use any of the YMCAs in the state rather than be limited to their local facility. The Fleurieu Aquatic Centre began offering free memberships to children under ten under his direction, an effort to combat childhood obesity.

He left the Y in November of 2019 and began working with Within Australia Incorporated, formerly SNAP Gippsland, a non-profit organization focusing on mental health and wellbeing. He worked there until December 2021.
