= Darren Gaspar =

Australian rules footballer, born 1976

Personal information
- Born: 20 May 1976 (age 50)
- Original team: South Fremantle (WAFL)
- Debut: 10 April 1994, Sydney vs. Adelaide, at the SCG
- Height: 193 cm (6 ft 4 in)
- Weight: 90 kg (198 lb)

Playing career^{1}
| Years | Club | Games (Goals) |
| 1994–1995 | Sydney | 21 (1) |
| 1996–2007 | Richmond | 207 (22) |
| Total | | 228 (23) |
- ^{1} Playing statistics correct to the end of 2007.

Career highlights
- Richmond Best & Fairest 2001; All Australian 2000, 2001

Darren Gaspar (/ɡəˈspɑːr/ gə-SPAR; born 20 May 1976) is a former Australian rules footballer in the Australian Football League (AFL).

== AFL career ==
=== Sydney Swans career (1994–1995) ===
Gaspar was drafted with the first pick in the 1993 National Draft by the Sydney Swans. He debuted against the Adelaide Crows in round three of the 1994 AFL season and injured his medial ligament in the third quarter, which resulted in him playing only five games for the year.

After only two seasons with the Swans, he turned down a one-year deal and moved to the Richmond Football Club via the 1996 Pre-season Draft.

=== Richmond career (1996–2007) ===
Robert Walls was influential in getting Gaspar to Richmond and he provided the emerging full-back with vital experience, playing him on Jason Dunstall and Tony Lockett in his first few games with the club.

His consistency saw him hold down the full-back position for over a decade with the Tigers. He finished runner-up in the Jack Dyer Medal behind Andrew Kellaway and earned All-Australian selection in 2000. Gaspar continued his good form in 2001, winning the Jack Dyer Medal and helping Richmond reach the finals for the first time since the 1995 AFL season. For the second consecutive year, he was named in the All-Australian team. He turned down a lucrative offer from the Fremantle Dockers at the end of the 2001 AFL season and remained at the Tigers.

In 2003, Gaspar was selected as the Australia international rules football team's goalkeeper for the 2001 International Rules Series in Australia. Australia lost the series 2–0, with a 130–105 aggregate score.

Injuries took a toll on him towards the end of his playing career, but he continued to give Richmond valuable service in the back half. At the age of 31 years, Gaspar announced his retirement after the fifth round of the 2007 AFL season, finishing on 228 games, after a disagreement with his coach, Terry Wallace, over his position in the team.

He currently commentates alongside Tim Gossage for SEN, covering West Coast Eagles games at Patersons Stadium.

== Statistics ==
Legend
| G | Goals | K | Kicks | D | Disposals | T | Tackles |
| B | Behinds | H | Handballs | M | Marks |

| Season | Team | No. | Games | Totals | | | | | | | Averages (per game) | | | | | | | Votes |
| Season | Team | No. | Games | G | B | K | H | D | M | T | G | B | K | H | D | M | T | Votes |
|---|---|---|---|---|---|---|---|---|---|---|---|---|---|---|---|---|---|---|
| 1994 | Sydney | 20 | 5 | 0 | 0 | 31 | 23 | 54 | 17 | 10 | 0.0 | 0.0 | 6.2 | 4.6 | 10.8 | 3.4 | 2.0 | 0 |
| 1995 | Sydney | 20 | 16 | 1 | 1 | 91 | 66 | 157 | 31 | 21 | 0.1 | 0.1 | 5.7 | 4.1 | 9.8 | 1.9 | 1.3 | 0 |
| 1996 | Richmond | 2 | 20 | 1 | 0 | 143 | 97 | 240 | 48 | 32 | 0.1 | 0.0 | 7.2 | 4.9 | 12.0 | 2.4 | 1.6 | 0 |
| 1997 | Richmond | 2 | 21 | 0 | 1 | 164 | 135 | 299 | 73 | 34 | 0.0 | 0.0 | 7.8 | 6.4 | 14.2 | 3.5 | 1.6 | 12 |
| 1998 | Richmond | 2 | 21 | 5 | 3 | 128 | 164 | 292 | 73 | 32 | 0.2 | 0.1 | 6.1 | 7.8 | 13.9 | 3.5 | 1.5 | 7 |
| 1999 | Richmond | 2 | 21 | 2 | 0 | 100 | 98 | 198 | 43 | 20 | 0.1 | 0.0 | 4.8 | 4.7 | 9.4 | 2.0 | 1.0 | 2 |
| 2000 | Richmond | 2 | 17 | 3 | 2 | 114 | 78 | 192 | 53 | 18 | 0.2 | 0.1 | 6.7 | 4.6 | 11.3 | 3.1 | 1.1 | 5 |
| 2001 | Richmond | 2 | 25 | 1 | 1 | 178 | 132 | 310 | 104 | 30 | 0.0 | 0.0 | 7.1 | 5.3 | 12.4 | 4.2 | 1.2 | 6 |
| 2002 | Richmond | 2 | 19 | 2 | 1 | 139 | 102 | 241 | 72 | 17 | 0.1 | 0.1 | 7.3 | 5.4 | 12.7 | 3.8 | 0.9 | 0 |
| 2003 | Richmond | 2 | 11 | 2 | 0 | 60 | 50 | 110 | 38 | 14 | 0.2 | 0.0 | 5.5 | 4.5 | 10.0 | 3.5 | 1.3 | 0 |
| 2004 | Richmond | 2 | 19 | 5 | 1 | 99 | 64 | 163 | 56 | 24 | 0.3 | 0.1 | 5.2 | 3.4 | 8.6 | 2.9 | 1.3 | 0 |
| 2005 | Richmond | 2 | 20 | 1 | 0 | 138 | 92 | 230 | 79 | 11 | 0.1 | 0.0 | 6.9 | 4.6 | 11.5 | 4.0 | 0.6 | 1 |
| 2006 | Richmond | 2 | 8 | 0 | 0 | 29 | 34 | 63 | 19 | 19 | 0.0 | 0.0 | 3.6 | 4.3 | 7.9 | 2.4 | 2.4 | 0 |
| 2007 | Richmond | 2 | 5 | 0 | 0 | 31 | 27 | 58 | 21 | 13 | 0.0 | 0.0 | 6.2 | 5.4 | 11.6 | 4.2 | 2.6 | 0 |
| Career | | | 228 | 23 | 10 | 1445 | 1162 | 2607 | 727 | 295 | 0.1 | 0.0 | 6.3 | 5.1 | 11.4 | 3.2 | 1.3 | 33 |

== Personal life ==
He is the brother of former AFL players, Damien Gaspar and Travis Gaspar.

Gaspar is also the part-owner of racehorse Roman Arch.

He is of Croatian ancestry.
