= Jon Ballantyne (footballer) =

Australian rules footballer (born 1969)

Personal information
- Born: 29 July 1969 (age 57)
- Original team: Bairnsdale

Playing career^{1}
Years	Club	Games (Goals)
1990–1993	Footscray	20 (46)
1994–1995	Collingwood	9 (0)
Total		29 (46)
- ^{1} Playing statistics correct to the end of 1995.

Jon Ballantyne (born 29 July 1969) is a former Australian rules footballer in the Australian Football League (AFL). He was recruited from Bairnsdale, Victoria and started his AFL career with Footscray.

== Footscray ==
Ballantyne debuted with the Bulldogs in 1990. He was used mostly as a spearhead, at a time when Danny Del-Re was considered the club's first choice full forward. Consequently, he managed only 20 games in four full seasons, although his return of 46 goals suggests that he was able to get amongst the goals when he was included in the team. As a Footscray player, Ballantyne headed the Reserves goal-kicking table in 1990 (64 goals) and 1992 (79 goals).

== Collingwood ==
Collingwood offered a life line to Ballantyne's football career in 1994. He was tried in defence, mainly at full back, with reasonable success. A serious knee injury ended his football career prematurely, after a further nine games with Collingwood in two seasons.

== NFL Europe ==
After his Australian rules football career ended, Ballantyne played American football for the Scottish Claymores in NFL Europe. A punter, Ballantyne was signed by National Football League (NFL) team, the Denver Broncos, but never played a match for them.

Ballantyne played amateur gridiron in Australia in the Victoria Gridiron Association.
