= Don Cockatoo-Collins =

Australian rules footballer (born 1978)

Personal information
- Full name: Donald Cockatoo-Collins
- Born: 1 April 1978 (age 48)
- Original team: Port Adelaide (SANFL)
- Height: 182 cm (6 ft 0 in)
- Weight: 79 kg (174 lb)

Playing career^{1}
Years	Club	Games (Goals)
1996–1998	Melbourne	9 (3)
- ^{1} Playing statistics correct to the end of 1998.

Donald Cockatoo-Collins (born 1 April 1978) is a former Australian rules footballer who played with Melbourne in the Australian Football League (AFL).

An Indigenous Australian, Cockatoo-Collins is a younger brother to Che Cockatoo-Collins and twin brother of David Cockatoo-Collins. Both are from Cairns, Queensland. Over three seasons, Donald made nine appearances for Melbourne .
