= Wade Chapman =

Australian rules footballer

Personal information
- Full name: Wade Chapman
- Born: 3 January 1976 (age 50)
- Original team: North Shore (GFL)
- Height: 178 cm (5 ft 10 in)
- Weight: 85 kg (187 lb)

Playing career^{1}
Years	Club	Games (Goals)
1994 – 1999	Sydney Swans	51 (19)
- ^{1} Playing statistics correct to the end of 1999.

Wade Chapman (born 3 January 1976) is a former Australian rules footballer who played for the Sydney Swans in the Australian Football League (AFL) during the 1990s.

Chapman is often remembered for being the player that passed the ball to Tony Lockett in the 1996 Preliminary Final against Essendon, resulting in the full-forward's after the siren heroics. He was on the wing in the Grand Final but could only manage seven disposals. In subsequent seasons Chapman was hampered by injuries, particularly with his groin, and he left the club in 1999. Although picked up by Port Adelaide in the draft that year, he did not play a senior game for them.

Chapman joined the Drysdale Football Club in 2007 as their playing coach, subsequently ending the club's 24 year premiership drought by winning the Bellarine Football League title in 2009. He led the Hawks to a second consecutive premiership in 2010, again defeating the Geelong Amateurs in the grand final. Late in 2010, Chapman took up a position as the senior assistant and midfield coach with the Werribee Tigers in the Victorian Football League (VFL). In 2014 he was appointed senior coach of Werribee Districts Football Club in the Western Region Football League.
