= Doug Bailey (footballer) =

Australian rules footballer

Brian Doug Bailey

Personal information
- Full name: Brian Doug Bailey
- Born: 6 December 1971 (age 54)
- Original team: Old Xaverians
- Draft: 33rd, 1994 Pre-Season Draft
- Height: 190 cm (6 ft 3 in)
- Weight: 95 kg (209 lb)

Playing career^{1}
Years	Club	Games (Goals)
1994–1995	St Kilda	11 (2)
- ^{1} Playing statistics correct to the end of 1995.

Doug Bailey (born 6 December 1971) is a former Australian rules footballer who played with St Kilda in the Australian Football League (AFL).

Originally pursuing a career in Rowing, Doug represented the Mercantile Rowing Club and was selected for Victoria in the Kings Cup in 1991. Representing Victoria in Football in the same year and unable to manage both sports at the elite level, AFL football was chosen. Bailey was selected by St Kilda with pick 33 in the 1994 Pre-Season Draft. The utility made 10 appearances in the 1994 AFL season, before succumbing to injury. Following surgery and a long period of absence, his only other appearance came the following year. Following his retirement from St Kilda, he played in the SANFL with club Woodville West Torrens (50 games).

After completing a Bachelor of Education (top 15% of graduates) and Masters of Education, Doug commenced a successful career in Education. Commencing at Christian Brothers College - Adelaide as Director of Rowing, then as Deputy Head of Campus - King Island Ballarat and Clarendon College. In 2008 Doug was appointed the Foundation Head of Campus - Berwick Grammar. In 2012 Doug was appointed to the position Principal St Margaret's School - Berwick Grammar School. Under his stewardship the schools thrived, reaching their highest ever enrolments and highest ever academic performance. In 2017 Doug accepted the position of Head of Middle School and Senior Deputy at Haileybury College - Australia's top rated school. In addition to this, Doug has taught at Monash University (2017) in the Education Department.

In a voluntary capacity Doug was an AFL commissioner representing the ASFLSE (South East) Chairing the South East Juniors (SEJ) and was a League Commissioner sitting on the AFLSE Advisory Committee.

Most recently Doug has completed a Masters of Business Administration (MBA) and a Masters In Conflict Management and Resolution, and currently holds the position of Senior Consultant, Berry Street Education Model (BSEM).
