= Rowan Warfe =

Australian rules footballer

Personal information
- Full name: Rowan Warfe
- Born: 23 June 1976 (age 50)
- Original team: Golden Square
- Height: 190 cm (6 ft 3 in)
- Weight: 89 kg (196 lb)

Playing career^{1}
Years	Club	Games (Goals)
1994–1996	Fitzroy	26 (1)
1997–2004	Sydney Swans	84 (4)
Total		110 (5)
- ^{1} Playing statistics correct to the end of 2004.

Rowan Warfe (born 23 June 1976) is a former Australian rules footballer who played for both the Sydney Swans and Fitzroy Football Club in the Australian Football League (AFL).

Warfe, a former Bendigo Under-18s player, made 26 appearances for Fitzroy before moving north to join the Sydney Swans. Plagued by injury, the defender appeared 84 times for the Swans over 8 seasons. He retired in 2004, playing his last game in a one-point win over Hawthorn.

Warfe now coaches for Golden Square in the Bendigo Football League.
