= Stephen Ryan (footballer) =

Australian rules footballer

Personal information
- Born: 6 July 1970 (age 56)
- Original team: Birchip / Melbourne High School
- Height: 191 cm (6 ft 3 in)
- Weight: 84 kg (185 lb)

Playing career^{1}
Years	Club	Games (Goals)
1990–1993	Richmond	43 (39)
1994	Collingwood	8 (4)
Total		51 (43)
- ^{1} Playing statistics correct to the end of 1994.

Career highlights
- Richmond Under 19s premiership player: 1989; Richmond leading goalkicker 1990

Stephen Ryan (born 6 July 1970) is a former Australian rules football player who played in the Australian Football League (AFL) between 1990 and 1993 for the Richmond Football Club and in 1994 for the Collingwood Football Club. He is the brother of fellow former Richmond player Des Ryan and the uncle of NBL players Aaron and Shaun Bruce.
