= Travis Gaspar =

Australian rules footballer

Personal information
- Born: 28 March 1981 (age 45)
- Original team: South Fremantle (WAFL)
- Debut: Round 8, 19 May 2001, West Coast vs. Hawthorn, at M.C.G.
- Height: 197 cm (6 ft 6 in)
- Weight: 91 kg (201 lb)

Playing career^{1}
Years	Club	Games (Goals)
2001–2005	West Coast Eagles	28 (15)
- ^{1} Playing statistics correct to the end of 2005.

Travis Gaspar (born 28 March 1981) is a former Australian rules footballer in the Australian Football League.

He was recruited as the number 14 draft pick in the 1999 AFL draft from South Fremantle. Gaspar made his debut for the West Coast Eagles in Round 8, 2001 against Hawthorn. During the 2005 preliminary final against Adelaide, Gaspar elbowed Ken McGregor just before the bounce-down. This resulted in a 50-metre penalty and Adelaide kicking the first goal. He was charged with striking, but found not guilty due to it being deemed an act of self-defence. Gaspar was cleared to play for the Eagles in the 2005 Grand Final against the Swans. After playing in the Grand Final, Gaspar never played AFL again after his contract was not renewed at the end of the 2006 season.

In 2011 Travis competed in the SunSmart Ironman Busselton in Western Australia. He finished the competition in 9 hours 48 seconds, ranked 10th in his division and 62nd overall.

Gaspar is now a Director of the Inspired Living Foundation, which provides life skills and wellbeing programs to schools and community groups.

Gaspar is the youngest brother of Damien and Darren, two players who also reached AFL level.
