= Paul Broderick =

Australian rules footballer

Personal information
- Born: 3 January 1970 (age 56)
- Original team: Camperdown (HFL)
- Debut: 18 June 1988, Fitzroy vs. Essendon, at Waverley Park
- Height: 178 cm (5 ft 10 in)
- Weight: 80 kg (176 lb)

Playing career^{1}
Years	Club	Games (Goals)
1988–1993	Fitzroy	93 (80)
1994–2001	Richmond	169 (90)
Total		262 (170)
- ^{1} Playing statistics correct to the end of 2001.

Career highlights
- Richmond Best and Fairest 1996

Paul Broderick (born 3 January 1970) is a former Australian rules footballer who played in the VFL/AFL between 1988 and 1993 for the Fitzroy Football Club and then from 1994 until 2001 for the Richmond Football Club. He won the Richmond Best and Fairest award in 1996.
