= David Cockatoo-Collins =

Australian rules footballer (born 1978)

Personal information
- Full name: David Cockatoo-Collins
- Born: 1 April 1978 (age 48)
- Original team: Port Adelaide (SANFL)
- Height: 180 cm (5 ft 11 in)
- Weight: 71 kg (157 lb)

Playing career^{1}
Years	Club	Games (Goals)
1995–1997	Melbourne	2 (0)
- ^{1} Playing statistics correct to the end of 1997.

David Cockatoo-Collins (born 1 April 1978) is a former Australian rules footballer who played with Melbourne in the Australian Football League (AFL).

An Indigenous Australian, he is a younger brother of Che Cockatoo-Collins and twin brother of Don Cockatoo-Collins, both from Cairns, Queensland. He made two appearances for Melbourne, over three seasons.

The twins made their league debuts together, in the opening round of the 1996 AFL season, against Geelong at the Melbourne Cricket Ground. His only other appearance came the following year, in round 17, against Collingwood. He played as a small forward.
