= Mark Merenda =

Australian rules footballer

Personal information
- Born: 29 October 1975 (age 51)
- Original team: Osborne Park / West Perth
- Debut: Round 12, 13 June 1994, Richmond vs. Collingwood, at the MCG
- Height: 180 cm (5 ft 11 in)
- Weight: 81 kg (179 lb)

Playing career^{1}
Years	Club	Games (Goals)
1994–2000	Richmond	75 (62)
2001–2002	West Coast	26 (26)
Total		101 (88)
- ^{1} Playing statistics correct to the end of 2002.

Career highlights
- Richmond reserves leading goalkicker 1994; Goal of the Year 2001

Mark Merenda (born 29 October 1975) is a former Australian rules footballer who played in the Australian Football League (AFL).

Merenda began his career with the West Perth Football Club in the West Australian Football League (WAFL).

Debuting in 1994 with the Richmond Football Club, he was noted as a midfielder or small forward. At the end of the 2000 season, after being out of action at Richmond from Round 2 onwards, he was moved to his home state to play with the West Coast Eagles after 75 games with the Tigers. In 2001 he kicked the Goal of the Year in Round 3 against St Kilda.

Back injuries plagued Merenda throughout his career and he was forced to retire at the end of the 2002 season. He is now involved with coaching at Claremont Football Club.

Mark Merenda is of Sicilian descent.
