= Grant Tanner =

Australian rules footballer

Personal information
- Born: 24 July 1970 (age 56)
- Original team: Norwood (SANFL)
- Debut: Round 9, 1994, Geelong vs. Richmond, at Kardinia Park
- Height: 184 cm (6 ft 0 in)
- Weight: 80 kg (176 lb)

Playing career^{1}
| Years | Club | Games (Goals) |
| 1994–1997 | Geelong | 69 (28) |
- ^{1} Playing statistics correct to the end of 1997.

Grant Tanner (born 24 July 1970) is a former Australian rules footballer who played with Geelong in the AFL during the mid-1990s.

Before Tanner came to Geelong he was on Adelaide's books but never made a senior appearance. In between he played in the SANFL with Norwood. He was part of Geelong's 1994 finals campaign but missed the Grand Final due to injury. The following year he was again injured late in the season but recovered in time for the 1995 AFL Grand Final, which his team lost heavily to Carlton.

A knee injury sustained in 1997 ended his career.
