= Michael Frost (footballer) =

Australian rules footballer

Personal information
- Full name: Michael Frost
- Born: 29 December 1970 (age 55)
- Original team: Swan Hill
- Height: 186 cm (6 ft 1 in)
- Weight: 92 kg (203 lb)

Playing career^{1}
Years	Club	Games (Goals)
1992–93	Footscray	13 (3)
1994	St Kilda	11 (2)
Total		24 (5)
- ^{1} Playing statistics correct to the end of 1994.

Michael Frost (born 29 December 1970) is a former Australian rules footballer who played for Footscray and St Kilda in the Australian Football League (AFL) during the early 1990s.

Frost spent just two seasons at Footscray but took part in the 1992 AFL finals series where he contributed two goals, one each in the Semi Final win and Preliminary Final loss. A Swan Hill recruit, he played with St Kilda in 1994 and despite making 11 appearances, experienced just one victory.

Frost played with Yarrawonga in the Ovens & Murray Football League in 1995.

Frost joined Yarraville Football Club for the 1996 and 1997 seasons helping the club win the FDFL First Division premiership in 1997.

He later joined Werribee Football Club. In a dominant 1998 season, Frost won the J. J. Liston Trophy with 32 votes, which as of 2021 remains the record number of votes under the current voting system (introduced in 1982); he also won the Werribee best and fairest. He was club captain from 1999 to 2001, and won another 'Best and Fairest' in 2000.
