= Rayden Tallis =

Australian rules footballer

Personal information
- Born: 9 June 1975 (age 51)
- Original team: Wantirna
- Debut: Round 3, 1994, Hawthorn vs. North Melbourne, at the MCG
- Height: 184 cm (6 ft 0 in)
- Weight: 85 kg (187 lb)

Playing career^{1}
Years	Club	Games (Goals)
1994–2004	Hawthorn	163 (27)
- ^{1} Playing statistics correct to the end of 2004.

Career highlights
- AFL Rising Star nominee: 1994

Rayden Tallis (born 9 June 1975) is a former Australian rules footballer who played with the Hawthorn Football Club in the Australian Football League (AFL).

Tallis was part of Eastern Ranges' inaugural squad in the 1992 TAC Cup season. He made his Hawthorn debut in 1994 and earned a Rising Star nomination late in the season. He usually played in the back pocket but was also used through the midfield. Former Hawthorn star Dermott Brereton earned a lengthy suspension for stomping on Tallis' head during a pre-season game in 1994.
