= List of AFL debuts in 1995 =

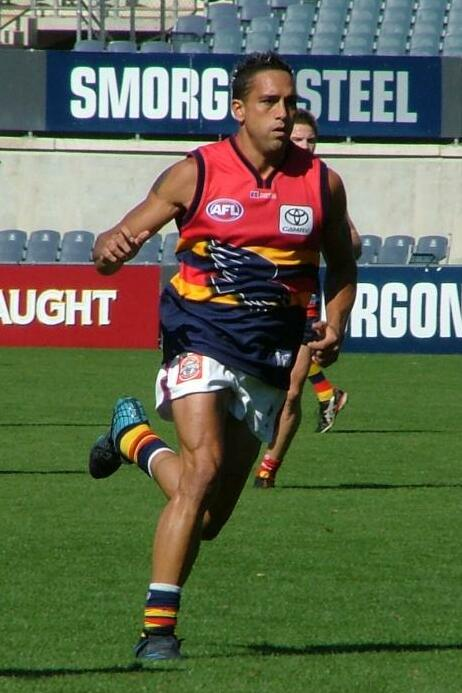
Andrew McLeod played the first of his 340 AFL games in 1995

During the 1995 Australian Football League (AFL) season 111 Australian rules footballers made their AFL debut with 55 others playing their first game for a new club.

This was the Fremantle Football Club's first season in the AFL, bringing the number of clubs participating to 16. 25 players made their AFL debut for Fremantle, more than double the number of debutantes in any other team during 1995.

== Summary ==
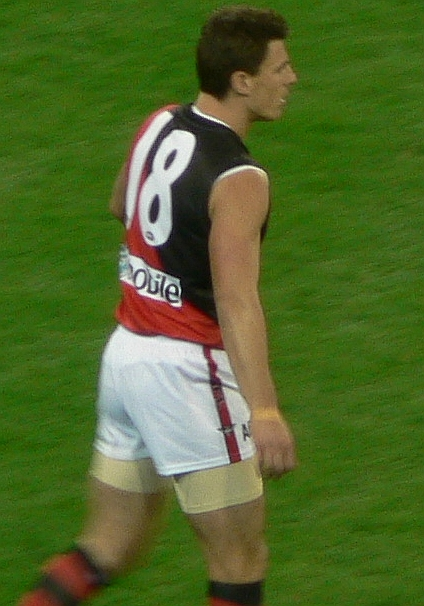
Matthew Lloyd kicked 7 goals in his debut year, and 926 goals in his career to be the 7th highest goal scorer of all time

Summary of debuts in 1995
Club	AFL debuts	Change of club
Adelaide	2	2
Brisbane Bears	6	3
Carlton	3	2
Collingwood	10	1
Essendon	4	2
Fitzroy	8	7
Footscray	8	2
Fremantle	25	16
Geelong	4	4
Hawthorn	4	3
Melbourne	6	3
North Melbourne	4	3
Richmond	3	3
St Kilda	11	1
Sydney	8	2
West Coast	5	1
Total	111	55

== AFL debuts ==
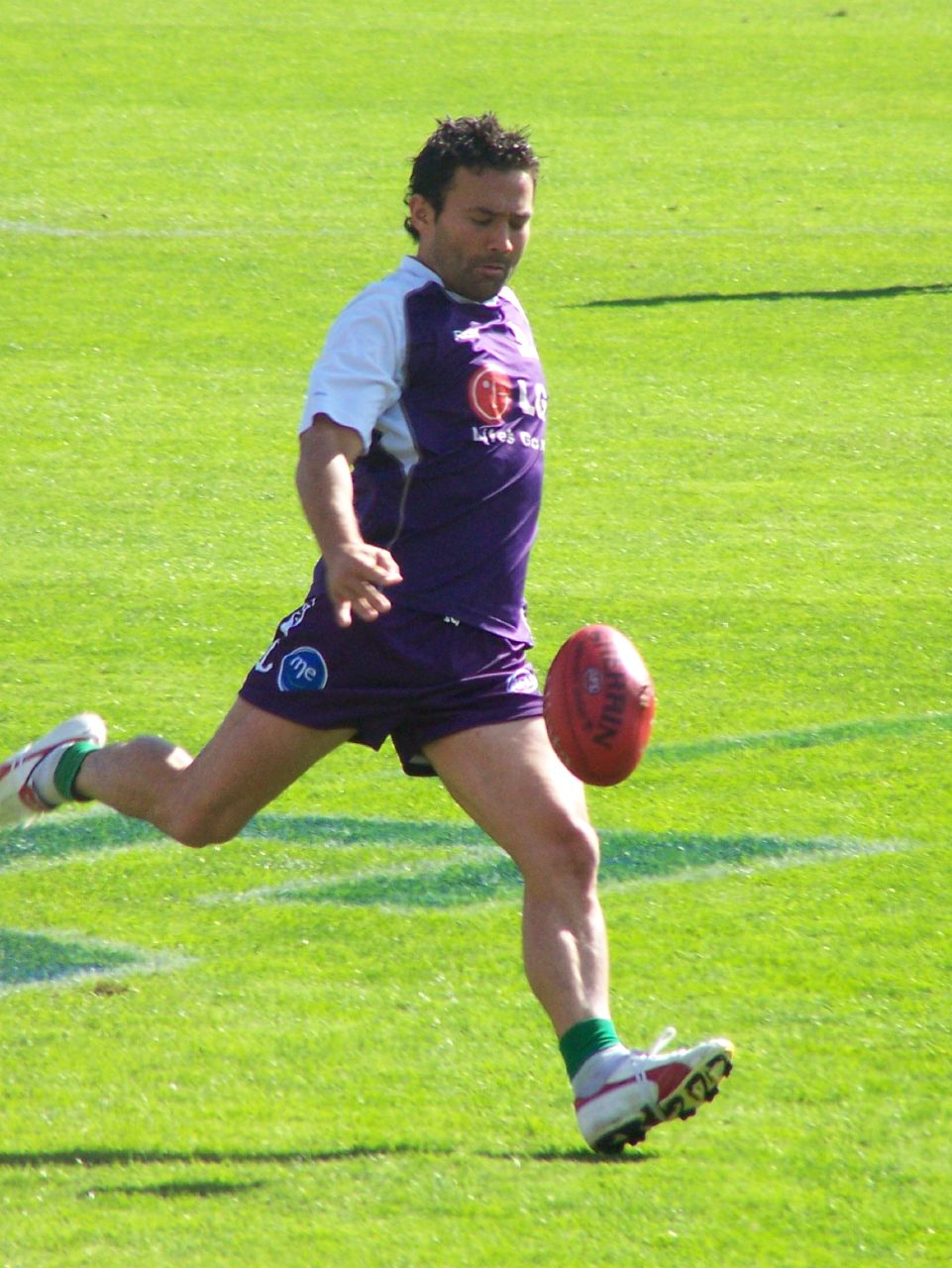
Peter Bell was one of 25 players from Fremantle to make their AFL debut in 1995

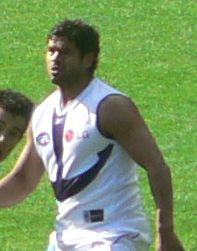
Jeff Farmer

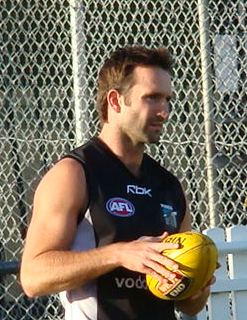
Darryl Wakelin

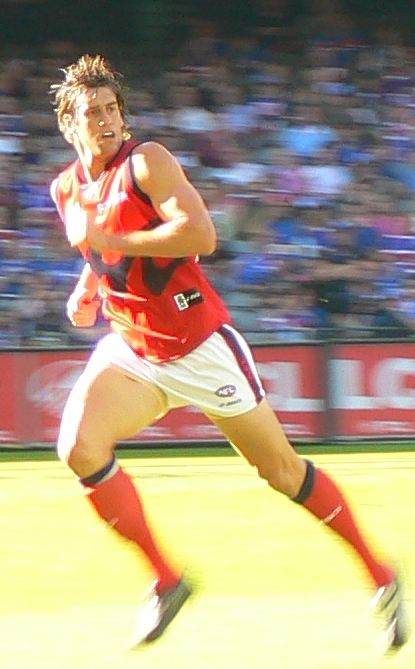
Jeff White

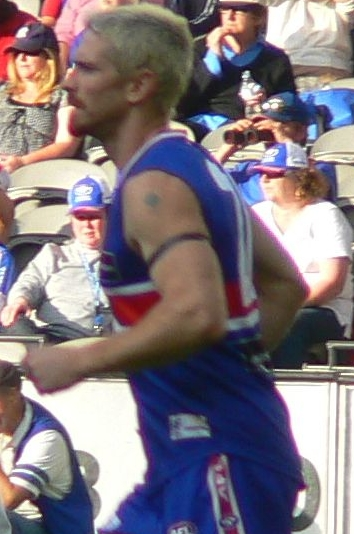
Jason Akermanis

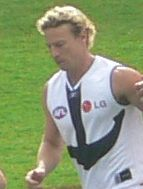
Shaun McManus

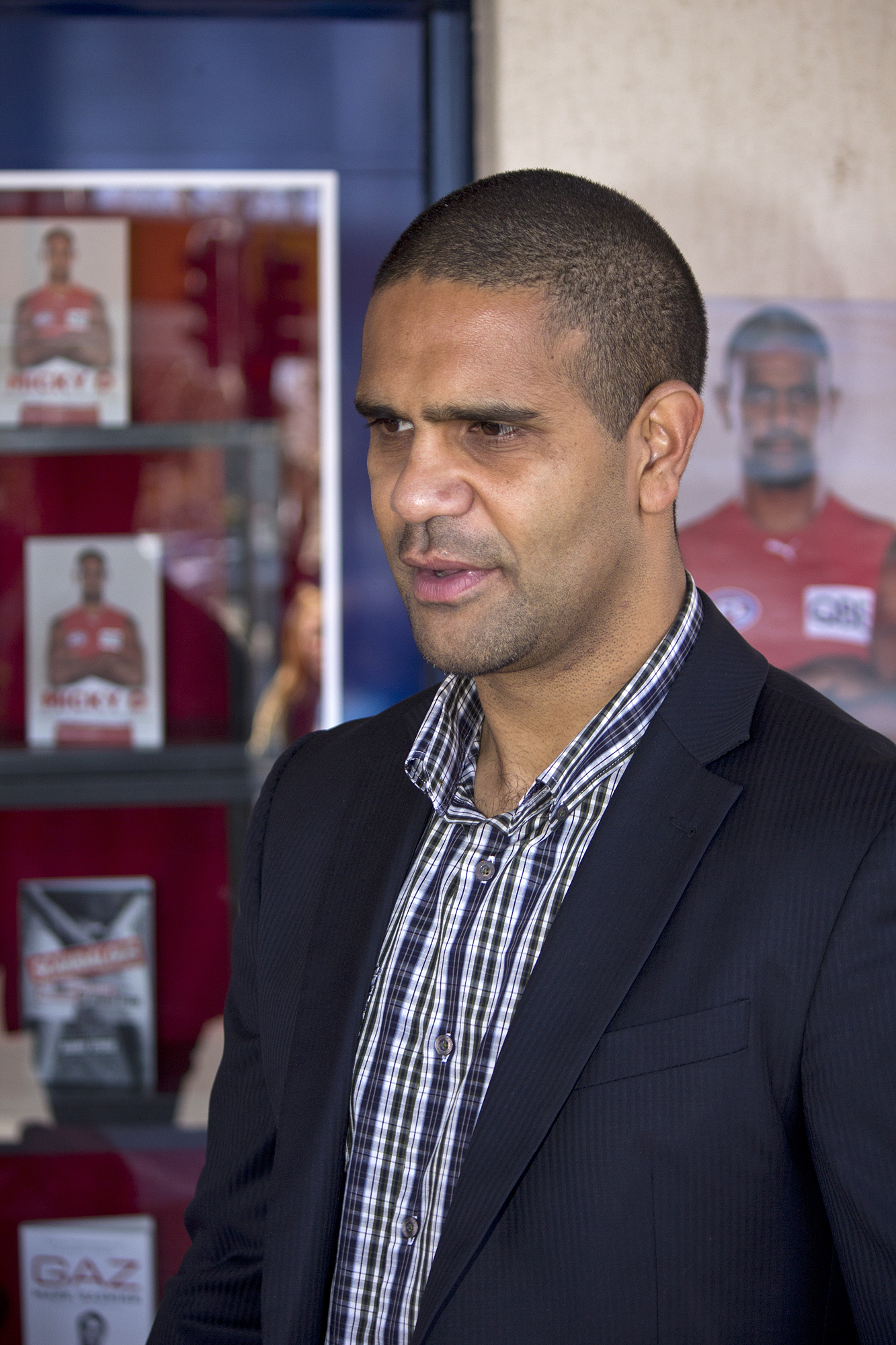
Michael O'Loughlin

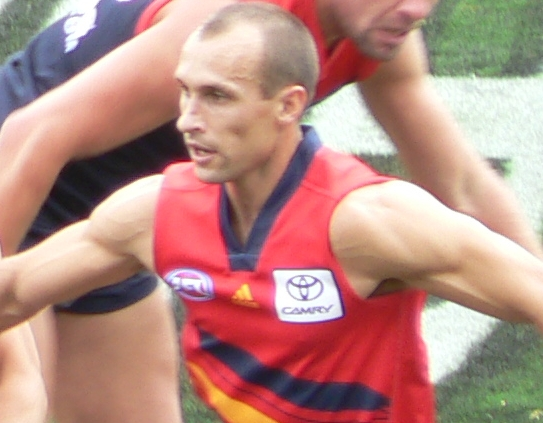
Tyson Edwards⋅

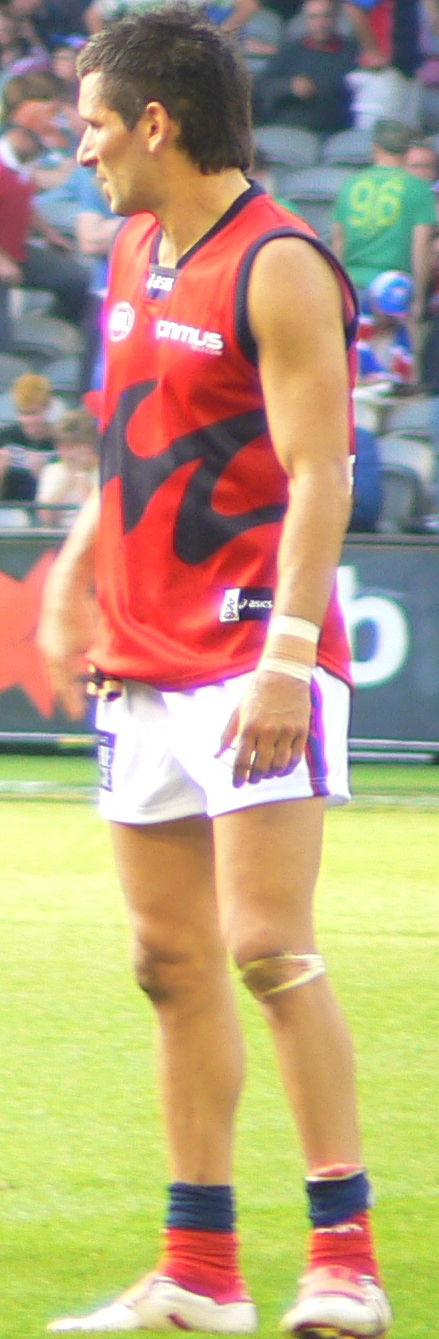
Adem Yze

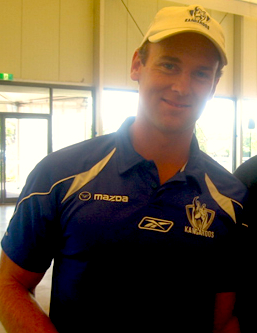
Adam Simpson was the first of the 1995 debutantes to become a senior AFL coach

Name	Club	Age at debut	Debut round	Games (in 1995)	Goals (in 1995)	Notes
Craig McRae	Brisbane Bears	21 years, 191 days	1	23	28	
Shawn Lewfatt	Essendon	18 years, 22 days	1	3	2	
Jonathon Robran	Hawthorn	22 years, 162 days	1	10		Son of Barrie Robran
Matthew Manfield	Fitzroy	17 years, 352 days	1	1		
Brett Chandler	Fitzroy	19 years, 264 days	1	12		
Quenton Leach	Fremantle	22 years, 224 days	1	19	8	
Scott Chisholm	Fremantle	21 years, 308 days	1	15	4	
Scott Edwards	Fremantle	26 years, 221 days	1	6	2	
Craig Burrows	Fremantle	21 years, 161 days	1	19	23	
Winston Abraham	Fremantle	20 years, 184 days	1	12	23	
Peter Bell	Fremantle	19 years, 31 days	1	2	2	Round 17 nomination, 1996 AFL Rising Star
Matthew Burton	Fremantle	24 years, 317 days	1	17	6	Brother of Jay Burton
Gary Dhurrkay	Fremantle	21 years, 29 days	1	14	21	
David Muir	Fremantle	23 years, 258 days	1	10	1	
Jamie Merillo	Fremantle	22 years, 125 days	1	11	2	
Robert Di Rosa	Geelong	17 years, 271 days	1	3		
Luke McCabe	Hawthorn	18 years, 234 days	1	7	2	
Luke Norman	Melbourne	23 years, 106 days	1	9	3	
Jeff Farmer	Melbourne	17 years, 281 days	1	7	4	Round 21 nomination, 1996 AFL Rising Star
Scott Camporeale	Carlton	19 years, 234 days	1	24	11	
Scott Burns	Collingwood	20 years, 100 days	1	21	2	
Nick Hider	Collingwood	23 years, 214 days	1	2	1	
Stephen Patterson	Collingwood	24 years, 89 days	1	19	21	
Chad Liddell	Collingwood	18 years, 72 days	1	7	3	
Lee Walker	Collingwood	22 years, 55 days	1	7	3	
Tyson Lane	Footscray	18 years, 220 days	1	9	7	Round 1 nomination, 1995 AFL Rising Star
Sedat Sir	Footscray	20 years, 28 days	1	6		
Shannon Grant	Sydney	17 years, 348 days	1	10	9	Round 6 nomination, 1996 AFL Rising Star
Darryl Wakelin	St Kilda	20 years, 234 days	1	21		Twin brother of Shane Wakelin
Steven Sziller	St Kilda	22 years, 108 days	1	22	6	
Austinn Jones	St Kilda	18 years, 186 days	1	19	10	Round 9 nomination, 1995 AFL Rising Star
Fraser Gehrig	West Coast	19 years, 30 days	1	16	21	Round 18 nomination, 1995 AFL Rising Star
Travis Edmonds	Fremantle	24 years, 58 days	2	1		
Leigh Wardell-Johnson	Fremantle	25 years, 22 days	2	11	10	
Anthony Jones	Fremantle	20 years, 109 days	2	11		
Peter Miller	Fremantle	26 years, 1 day	2	16	15	
David Bourke	Richmond	19 years, 91 days	2	15	1	Round 5 nomination, 1995 AFL Rising Star, son of Francis Bourke
Mark Orchard	Collingwood	19 years, 13 days	3	6	3	
Chris Curran	Collingwood	20 years, 255 days	3	10	2	
Shane Parker	Fremantle	22 years, 57 days	3	11		
Jeff White	Fremantle	18 years, 56 days	3	6	3	Number 1 draft selection in 1994 AFL draft
Steven Lawrence	Brisbane Bears	18 years, 332 days	3	13	1	Round 6 nomination, 1995 AFL Rising Star
Justin Crawford	Sydney	18 years, 28 days	3	10	7	Round 19 nomination, 1995 AFL Rising Star, brother of Shane Crawford
Joel Smith	St Kilda	17 years, 348 days	3	20	6	Round 14 nomination, 1995 AFL Rising Star
Dean Matthews	St Kilda	23 years, 269 days	3	1		
Glen Coghlan	St Kilda	20 years, 261 days	3	11	7	
Josh Kitchen	St Kilda	19 years, 336 days	3	3	1	
Mark Kennedy	St Kilda	22 years, 333 days	4	8		
Tim Scott	Sydney	23 years, 131 days	4	1		
Jason Akermanis	Brisbane Bears	18 years, 59 days	4	17	12	
Jason Wild	Collingwood	19 years, 75 days	4	12	3	
Peter Bird	Fitzroy	19 years, 90 days	5	12	5	
Anthony Mellington	Fitzroy	20 years, 276 days	5	6	2	
Shaun McManus	Fremantle	19 years, 80 days	5	18	13	Round 10 nomination, 1995 AFL Rising Star
Neil Mildenhall	Fremantle	26 years, 233 days	5	7	2	
John Cunningham	Geelong	21 years, 70 days	5	2		
Glenn Freeborn	North Melbourne	22 years, 84 days	5	9	4	
Gary Moorcroft	Essendon	19 years, 14 days	5	1		
Michael O'Loughlin	Sydney	18 years, 70 days	5	11	12	Round 8 nomination, 1995 AFL Rising Star
Andrew McLeod	Adelaide	18 years, 274 days	6	15	17	Round 20 nomination, 1995 AFL Rising Star
John Rombotis	Fitzroy	18 years, 205 days	6	4	1	
Brayden Lyle	West Coast	22 years, 62 days	6	15	4	
Tony Brown	St Kilda	17 years, 343 days	6	17	9	
Shannon Gibson	Hawthorn	19 years, 187 days	7	10	2	
Clinton Wolf	Fremantle	26 years, 147 days	7	4		
Anthony Rocca	Sydney	17 years, 277 days	8	12	8	
Michael Martin	Footscray	18 years, 85 days	8	3	1	
Sam Phillipou	Footscray	20 years, 244 days	8	3	3	
Craig Callaghan	Fremantle	19 years, 72 days	8	10	4	Round 16 nomination, 1995 AFL Rising Star, Round 22 nomination, 1996 AFL Rising Star
Damien Gaspar	Melbourne	20 years, 54 days	8	8		
James McLure	Geelong	20 years, 250 days	9	3		
Jeff Bruce	Fitzroy	21 years, 199 days	9	7	3	
Daryl Griffin	Footscray	19 years, 125 days	9	14		
Simon Cox	Footscray	18 years, 123 days	9	2	2	
Mark Stevens	North Melbourne	19 years, 220 days	10	8	12	
Simon Arnott	Sydney	19 years, 110 days	10	5	2	
Simon Beaumont	Carlton	19 years, 173 days	10	2	1	
Daniel Harford	Hawthorn	18 years, 78 days	10	13	5	
Jason Heatley	West Coast	23 years, 104 days	10	1	2	
Matthew Jackson	St Kilda	20 years, 298 days	11	4	2	
Stephen Jurica	Richmond	18 years, 349 days	11	13	21	Round 21 nomination, 1995 AFL Rising Star
Tyson Edwards	Adelaide	18 years, 308 days	11	12	2	
Shane Hodges	Brisbane Bears	20 years, 160 days	11	4		
Andrew Nichol	Footscray	20 years, 205 days	12	3		
Brad Wira	Fremantle	23 years, 100 days	12	1		
Kingsley Hunter	Fremantle	20 years, 29 days	12	3		Round 14 nomination, 1996 AFL Rising Star
Clay Sampson	Melbourne	19 years, 122 days	12	5		
Ian Downsborough	West Coast	23 years, 164 days	13	1		
Adem Yze	Melbourne	17 years, 283 days	13	9	3	Round 11 nomination, 1996 AFL Rising Star
Ashley Blurton	West Coast	20 years, 119 days	13	3		
Danny Morgan	Essendon	20 years, 316 days	13	8	2	
Trent Bartlett	Brisbane Bears	18 years, 224 days	14	8	1	
Matthew Lloyd	Essendon	17 years, 84 days	14	5	7	Round 19 nomination, 1996 AFL Rising Star
Mark Gale	Fremantle	19 years, 63 days	14	1		
Jason Torney	Richmond	18 years, 29 days	15	6	2	
Ben Harrison	Carlton	20 years, 180 days	15	2		
Robert Ahmat	Collingwood	17 years, 362 days	15	3	1	
Jay Burton	Fremantle	22 years, 271 days	16	2		Brother of Matthew Burton
Adam Simpson	North Melbourne	19 years, 171 days	18	2		Round 5 nomination, 1996 AFL Rising Star
Chris Hemley	St Kilda	17 years, 331 days	18	1		
Dion Myles	Sydney	19 years, 96 days	18	3		
Andrew Schauble	Collingwood	18 years, 262 days	18	3	1	Round 7 nomination, 1996 AFL Rising Star
Paul Dimattina	Footscray	20 years, 257 days	18	2		Son of Frank Dimattina
Peter Doyle	Fitzroy	21 years, 347 days	18	5	1	
Daniel Bandy	Fremantle	19 years, 267 days	19	3	6	Round 2 nomination, 1996 AFL Rising Star
Marty Warry	Fitzroy	18 years, 221 days	19	3		
Craig Biddiscombe	Geelong	18 years, 332 days	20	2		Round 13 nomination, 1996 AFL Rising Star
Brent Green	Brisbane Bears	19 years, 144 days	20	1		
Trent Ormond-Allen	Melbourne	19 years, 82 days	22	1		
Paul Geister	North Melbourne	23 years, 217 days	22	3		
Leo Barry	Sydney	18 years, 108 days	22	1	1	

== Change of AFL club ==
Name	Club	Age at debut	Debut round	Games (in 1995)	Goals (in 1995)	Notes
Jason McCartney	Adelaide	21 years, 17 days	1	20	16	Previously played for Collingwood
Matthew Connell	Adelaide	22 years, 240 days	1	21	6	Previously played for West Coast
Matthew Armstrong	North Melbourne	28 years, 30 days	1	25	13	Previously played for Fitzroy
Robert Scott	North Melbourne	26 years, 30 days	1	25	17	Previously played for Geelong
Keenan Reynolds	North Melbourne	26 years, 84 days	1	9	2	Previously played for Footscray
Ross Lyon	Brisbane Bears	28 years, 144 days	1	2		Previously played for Fitzroy
Stephen O'Reilly	Fremantle	22 years, 143 days	1	20	3	Previously played for Geelong
Tim Darcy	Essendon	31 years, 77 days	1	14	5	Previously played for Geelong
Martin Pike	Fitzroy	22 years, 138 days	1	14	10	Previously played for Melbourne
Simon Atkins	Fitzroy	26 years, 99 days	1	22	7	Previously played for Footscray
Doug Hawkins	Fitzroy	34 years, 331 days	1	21	11	Previously played for Footscray
Wayne Lamb	Fitzroy	22 years, 164 days	1	16	10	Previously played for Melbourne
Simon Minton-Connell	Hawthorn	25 years, 340 days	1	19	31	Previously played for Carlton and Sydney
Jason Norrish	Fremantle	23 years, 66 days	1	17	2	Previously played for Melbourne
Phil Gilbert	Fremantle	25 years, 137 days	1	11	2	Previously played for Melbourne
Dale Kickett	Fremantle	26 years, 332 days	1	20		Previously played for Fitzroy, West Coast, St Kilda and Essendon
Peter Mann	Fremantle	24 years, 206 days	1	22	33	Previously played for North Melbourne
Ben Allan	Fremantle	26 years, 168 days	1	22	15	Previously played for Hawthorn
Tony Delaney	Fremantle	19 years, 95 days	1	11	8	Previously played for Essendon
Chris Groom	Fremantle	21 years, 216 days	1	7	18	Previously played for Adelaide
Brendan Krummel	Fremantle	22 years, 281 days	1	1		Previously played for West Coast
Todd Ridley	Fremantle	26 years, 50 days	1	18	15	Previously played for Essendon
Scott Watters	Fremantle	26 years, 67 days	1	16	6	Previously played for West Coast and Sydney
Brad Sholl	Geelong	22 years, 142 days	1	25	1	Previously played for North Melbourne
Brenton Sanderson	Geelong	21 years, 34 days	1	13	2	Previously played for Adelaide and Collingwood
Shaun Smith	Melbourne	25 years, 283 days	1	22	51	Previously played for North Melbourne
Marcus Seecamp	Melbourne	22 years, 248 days	1	22	3	Previously played for Fitzroy
Stuart Wigney	Richmond	25 years, 347 days	1	12	1	Previously played for Footscray, Sydney and Adelaide
Andrew Gowers	Brisbane Bears	25 years, 355 days	1	18	1	Previously played for Hawthorn
Matt Clape	Carlton	25 years, 309 days	1	23	31	Previously played for West Coast
Jose Romero	Footscray	23 years, 244 days	1	17	10	Previously played for North Melbourne
Paul Roos	Sydney	31 years, 279 days	1	21	7	Previously played for Fitzroy
Tony Lockett	Sydney	29 years, 25 days	1	19	110	Previously played for St Kilda
Andrew Wills	Fremantle	23 years, 95 days	2	13	18	Previously played for Geelong
Andrew McGovern	Fremantle	27 years, 0 days	2	17	1	Previously played for Sydney
Greg Madigan	Fremantle	25 years, 74 days	2	18	1	Previously played for Hawthorn
Andrew Cavedon	Fitzroy	23 years, 154 days	2	5	7	Previously played for Carlton
Dermott Brereton	Collingwood	30 years, 239 days	3	15	30	Previously played for Hawthorn and Sydney
John Hutton	Fremantle	28 years, 324 days	3	13	27	Previously played for Brisbane Bears and Sydney
Michael Dunstan	West Coast	24 years, 35 days	3	5	1	Previously played for Fitzroy
Justin Charles	Richmond	24 years, 200 days	3	17	10	Previously played for Footscray
Glenn Nugent	St Kilda	23 years, 159 days	3	11	1	Previously played for Hawthorn
Mark Fraser	Essendon	24 years, 73 days	3	5		Previously played for Collingwood
Derek Hall	Geelong	24 years, 143 days	4	12	6	Previously played for West Coast
Darren Holmes	Fitzroy	24 years, 231 days	4	14	2	Previously played for Sydney
Michael Johnston	Footscray	24 years, 67 days	4	2		Previously played for Hawthorn
Martin Heppell	Melbourne	20 years, 160 days	4	2		Previously played for St Kilda
Adam McCarthy	Fitzroy	23 years, 75 days	5	13	9	Previously played for North Melbourne
Chris Sullivan	Richmond	22 years, 264 days	5	2	1	Previously played for Melbourne
Tony Woods	Hawthorn	25 years, 302 days	5	18	2	Previously played for Fitzroy and Collingwood
Shannon Corcoran	Brisbane Bears	24 years, 75 days	6	3		Previously played for Footscray
Brendon Retzlaff	Fremantle	26 years, 29 days	8	6	2	Previously played for Brisbane Bears and West Coast
Randall Bone	Hawthorn	21 years, 203 days	10	7	3	Previously played for Adelaide
Glenn Manton	Carlton	22 years, 23 days	12	12	2	Previously played for Essendon
Tim Allen	Geelong	24 years, 325 days	22	1		Previously played for St Kilda
