= 1994 AFL draft =

Draft for the Australian Football League

The 1994 AFL draft consisted of a pre-season draft, a national draft, a trade period and a rookie elevation. The AFL draft is the annual draft of talented players by Australian rules football teams that participate in the main competition of that sport, the Australian Football League.

In 1994 there were 97 picks to be drafted between 15 teams in the national draft. The Fremantle Dockers were given the first pick as they were to compete for the first time in the 1995 AFL season.

== 1994 pre-draft selections ==
Category	Player	Recruited by	Recruited from
Pre-draft selection	Nathan Mourish	Fremantle	Perth
Pre-draft selection	Brad Cassidy	Fremantle	Ballarat U18
Pre-draft selection	Daniel Bandy	Fremantle	Perth
Pre-draft selection	Jay Burton	Fremantle	Subiaco
Pre-draft selection	Craig Nettelbeck	Fremantle	Sydney
Pre-draft selection	Anthony Ljubic	Fremantle	Gippsland U18
Pre-draft selection	Neil Mildenhall	Fremantle	West Perth
Pre-draft selection	Peter Miller	Fremantle	East Perth
Pre-draft selection	David Muir	Fremantle	Nth Melbourne
Pre-draft selection	Shane Parker	Fremantle	Subiaco
Pre-draft selection	Luke Toia	Fremantle	Subiaco
Pre-draft supplementary selections	Trent Churchill	Footscray	Western Bulldogs Reserves
Pre-draft supplementary selections	Matthew Blagrove	Carlton	Carlton Reserves
Pre-draft supplementary selections	Chris Curran	Collingwood	Collingwood Reserves
Pre-draft supplementary selections	Brett Chandler	Fitzroy	Fitzroy Reserves
Pre-draft supplementary selections	Matthew Jackson	St Kilda	St Kilda
Pre-draft supplementary selections	Danny Morgan	Essendon	Essendon Reserves
Pre-draft supplementary selections	James McLure	Geelong	Geelong Reserves
Pre-draft supplementary selections	Adam Hilton	Hawthorn	Hawthorn Reserves
Zone Selection	Tim Scott	Sydney	Albury
Zone Selection	Justin Crawford	Sydney	Tocumwal
Zone Selection	Leo Barry	Sydney	Deniliquin
Zone Selection	Jason Akermanis	Brisbane	Mayne
Zone Selection	Travis Edmonds	Fremantle	Swan Districts
Zone Selection	John Hutton	Fremantle	Palm Beach-Currumbin
Zone Selection	Todd Menegola	Fremantle	Swan Districts
Zone Selection	Clinton Wolf	Fremantle	Claremont
Uncontracted Player Selection	Peter Caven	Sydney	Fitzroy
Uncontracted Player Selection	Ben Allan	Fremantle	Hawthorn
Father Son Selection	David Bourke	Richmond	Central

== 1994 national draft ==
Pick	Player	Recruited by	Recruited from
1	Jeff White	Fremantle	Southern U18
2	Anthony Rocca	Sydney	Northern U18
3	Shannon Grant	Sydney	Western U18
4	Scott Lucas	Essendon	Geelong U18
5	Joel Smith	St Kilda	Murray 18
6	Robert McMahon	Fitzroy	Gippsland U18
7	Tony Brown	St Kilda	Geelong U18
8	Daniel Harford	Hawthorn	Northern U18
9	Ben Wilson	Collingwood	Norwood
10	Blake Caracella	Essendon	Northern U18
11	Damien Ryan	Richmond	Eastern U18
12	Shane Sikora	West Coast	Murray U18
13	Chris Hemley	St Kilda	Geelong U18
14	Michael Martin	Footscray	Hobart
15	Scott Camporeale	Carlton	WWT Eagles
16	Adem Yze	Melbourne	Murray U18
17	Carl Steinfort	Geelong	Centrals Dragons
18	Robert Di Rosa	Geelong	Western U18
19	Ben Holland	Fitzroy	North Adelaide
20	Stuart Mangin	Sydney	Northern U18
21	Matthew Nicks	Sydney	West Adelaide
22	Winston Abraham	Fremantle	Perth
23	John Rombotis	Fitzroy	Centrals Dragons
24	Matthew Manfield	Fitzroy	WWT Eagles
25	Steven Sziller	St Kilda	WWT Eagles
26	Tim Elliott	St Kilda	Gippsland U18
27	Toby Kennett	Adelaide	Sturt
28	Shawn Lewfatt	Essendon	Western U18
29	Jason Torney	Richmond	South Adelaide
30	Chad Liddell	Collingwood	Southern U18
31	Allen Nash	Adelaide	Western U18
32	Simon Cox	Footscray	Glenelg
33	Mark Cullen	Carlton	Eastern U18
34	Michael Polley	Melbourne	Northern U18
35	Marty Warry	Fitzroy	Centrals Dragons
36	Matthew Robbins	Geelong	Centrals Dragons
37	Ashley Blurton	West Coast	West Perth
38	Matthew Collins	Adelaide	Northern U18
39	Stephen Carter	Essendon	Port Magpies
40	Michael O'Loughlin	Sydney	Central District
41	Adam White	Carlton	Eastern U18
42	Douglas Headland	Fremantle	Perth
43	Dean Matthews	St Kilda	Bulleen-Templestowe
44	Jeremy Dyer	West Coast	Geelong U18
45	Gary Moorcroft	Essendon	Northern U18
46	Justin Charles	Richmond	Western Bulldogs
47	Robert Ahmat	Collingwood	Darwin
48	Austinn Jones	St Kilda	Southern U18
49	Shaun Baxter	Footscray	Geelong U18
50	Brett Higgins	Adelaide	Port Magpies
51	Clay Sampson	Melbourne	South Adelaide
52	Danny Stevens	Nth Melbourne	Northern U18
53	Mark Orchard	Collingwood	Ballarat U18
54	Ian Downsborough	West Coast	West Perth
55	Mark Belleville	Nth Melbourne	Western U18
56	Ryan Smith	Fremantle	West Perth
57	Emil Parthenides	Sydney	Eastern U18
58	Peter Bird	Fitzroy	Geelong U18
59	Nathan Saunders	Hawthorn	Geelong U18
60	Brad Scott	Hawthorn	Eastern U18
61	Stephen Zavalas	Collingwood	Western U18
62	Justin Blumfield	Essendon	Tuggeranong
63	Ross Funcke	Richmond	Ballarat U18
64	Robert Powell	Collingwood	Northern U18
65	Lee Fraser	Hawthorn	Western U18
66	Scott Taylor	Footscray	Geelong U18
67	Tony Bourke	Carlton	Ballarat U18
68	Luke Norman	Melbourne	Wangaratta
69	Dean Helmers	Geelong	Western U18
70	Adam Benjamin	Geelong	Assumption College
71	Jason Spinks	West Coast	Sydney
72	Daniel Wilcox	Fremantle	Northern U18
73	Sam McFarlane	Fremantle	Subiaco
74	Troy Luff	Sydney	Sydney
75	Gerard Jess	Brisbane	Ballarat U18
76	Todd McHardy	Melbourne	Western U18
77	Ben Dixon	Hawthorn	Assumption College
78	Daryl Griffin	Footscray	Sydney
79	Aaron Hamill	Carlton	Tuggeranong
80	Ben Atkins	Nth Melbourne	Glenorchy
81	Tim Allen	Geelong	Hawthorn
82	Pass	Fremantle	1994 NAT
83	Pass	Fremantle	1994 NAT
84	Doug Hawkins	Fitzroy	Footscray
85	Michael Agnello	Brisbane	Southern U18
86	Shaun Gordon	Richmond	Murray U18
87	Simon Arnott	Sydney	Collegians
88	Nathon Irvin	Footscray	Norwood
89	David Nicholson	Carlton	Western U18
90	Matthew Joy	Nth Melbourne	Southern U18
91	Pass	Fremantle	
92	Pass	Fremantle	
93	Michael Murphy	Brisbane	Brisbane
94	Jade Rawlings	Hawthorn	Devonport
95	Kym Eyers	Nth Melbourne	Central District
96	Pass	Fremantle	
97	Pass	Fremantle	

== 1995 pre-season draft ==
Pick	Player	Recruited by	Recruited from
1	Paul Roos	Sydney	Fitzroy
2	Greg Madigan	Fremantle	Hawthorn
3	Pass	Sydney	-
4	Jason Ramsey	Fitzroy	Port Adelaide
5	Glen Coghlan	St Kilda	Kyabram
6	Ross Lyon	Brisbane Bears	Fitzroy
7	Peter Vardy	Adelaide	Central District
8	Mark Fraser	Essendon	Collingwood
9	Stuart Wigney	Richmond	Adelaide
10	Dermott Brereton	Collingwood	Sydney
11	Richard Taylor	Hawthorn	Hawthorn
12	Jose Romero	Footscray	North Melbourne
13	Matt Clape	Carlton	West Coast
14	Shaun Smith	Melbourne	Werribee
15	Keenan Reynolds	North Melbourne	Footscray
16	Derek Hall	Geelong	West Perth
17	Paul Peos	West Coast	Brisbane Bears
18	Anthony Mellington	Fitzroy	Shepparton
19	Mark Kennedy	St Kilda	Woodville-West Torrens
20	Shannon Corcoran	Brisbane Bears	Footscray
21	Tyson Edwards	Adelaide	West Adelaide
22	Tim Darcy	Essendon	Geelong
23	Mark McQueen	Richmond	Woodville-West Torrens
24	Nick Hider	Collingwood	Camperdown
25	Tony Woods	Hawthorn	Collingwood
26	Paul Dimattina	Footscray	Sandringham
27	Glenn Manton	Carlton	Essendon
28	Martin Heppell	Melbourne	St Kilda
29	Glenn Gorman	North Melbourne	Sydney
30	Dean Talbot	Geelong	East Perth
31	Jason Spinks	West Coast	West Coast
32	Simon Atkins	Fitzroy	Footscray
33	Matthew Banks	Essendon	Eastern (U18)
34	Ryan Aitken	Collingwood	Southern (U18)
35	Michael Johnston	Footscray	Hawthorn
36	Alan Thorpe	Carlton	Footscray
37	Andrew Nichol	Footscray	Box Hill

=== 1995 uncontracted and concession player selections ===
As part of Fremantle Football Club's impending entry to the AFL in the 1995 AFL season, clubs that lost uncontracted players to the new side were allocated a 16-year-old concession selection to compensate them for their loss. These players were otherwise not eligible to be drafted until the following draft. Fremantle and Essendon Football Club arranged a deal where they would not recruit any uncontracted players from clubs below Essendon on the ladder, to allow Essendon the chance to have the first selection in the concession selections, which they used to recruit their future captain and leading goalscorer, Matthew Lloyd.

Uncontracted Player	Recruited by	Recruited from	Concession selection	Recruited by	Recruited from
Todd Ridley	Fremantle	Essendon	Matthew Lloyd	Essendon	Western U18
Ben Allan	Fremantle	Hawthorn	David McEwan	Hawthorn	Northern U18
Jason Norrish	Fremantle	Melbourne	David Cockatoo-Collins	Melbourne	Port Adelaide
Peter Mann	Fremantle	North Melbourne	Stuart Cochrane	North Melbourne	Central District
Andrew Wills	Fremantle	Geelong	Adam Houlihan	Geelong	Murray U18
Brendan Krummel	Fremantle	West Coast	Chad Morrison	West Coast	Southern U18
Stephen O'Reilly	Fremantle	Geelong	Steven King	Geelong	Murray U18
