= Chris Sullivan (Australian rules footballer) =

Australian rules footballer

Personal information
- Full name: Chris J. Sullivan
- Born: 8 August 1972 (age 54)
- Original team: Mazenod Old Collegians
- Height: 180 cm (5 ft 11 in)
- Weight: 75 kg (165 lb)

Playing career^{1}
Years	Club	Games (Goals)
1992–1994	Melbourne	27 (22)
1995–1996	Richmond	8 (4)
Total		35 (26)
- ^{1} Playing statistics correct to the end of 1996.

Career highlights
- Harold Ball Memorial Trophy: 1992

Chris Sullivan (born 8 August 1972) is a former Australian rules footballer who played with Melbourne and Richmond in the Australian Football League (AFL).

Sullivan was a rover, recruited from Mazenod Old Collegians as a young teenager. He kicked three goals on debut and at the end of the season was awarded Melbourne's "Best First Year Player" award.

He was traded to Richmond and the end of the 1994 season, in exchange for pick 76 in the 1994 National Draft, used on Todd McHardy.

Sullivan, whose father Tony played 191 games for Melbourne, went to Frankston after his time in the AFL came to an end.
