= Timothy Scott =

Tim Scott (born 1965) is a United States Senator from the state of South Carolina.

Tim or Timothy Scott may also refer to:

== Sports ==
- Tim Scott (American football) (born 1993), American football safety
- Tim Scott (baseball) (born 1966), American pitcher
- Tim Scott (footballer) (born 1971), former Australian rules footballer
- Tim Scott (hurler) (1895–1972), Irish hurler

== Others ==
- Tim Scott (guitarist) (born 1971), British instrumental recording artist
- Tim Scott (artist) (born 1937), British sculptor
- Timothy Scott (actor, born 1955) (1955–1988), American actor and dancer, mainly Broadway
- Timothy Scott (actor, born 1937) (1937–1995), American actor
- Tim Scott McConnell (born 1958), American singer-songwriter, also known as Ledfoot
