= Blurton (surname) =

Blurton is a surname. Notable people with the surname include:

- Ashley Blurton (born 1975), Australian footballer
- Ian Blurton (born 1965), Canadian musician and record producer
- Richard Blurton (born 1952), British archaeologist

== See also ==
- Blurton, village in Staffordshire, England
