= Anthony Sullivan =

Anthony Sullivan may refer to:

- Anthony Sullivan (rugby) (born 1968), Welsh former professional rugby player
- Anthony Sullivan (pitchman) (born 1969), English producer and pitchman known as "The OxiClean Man"
- Tony Sullivan (born 1949), former Australian rules footballer

== See also ==
- Anthony O'Sullivan (1855–1920), American silent film actor and director
- Tony O'Sullivan (born 1966), Irish former hurler
