= Tim Elliott (disambiguation) =

Tim Elliott (born 1986) is an American mixed martial artist.

Tim Elliott may also refer to:

- Tim Elliott (geochemist), British geochemist and academic
- Tim Elliott (footballer) (born 1976), Australian rules footballer
- Tim Eliott (1935–2011), New Zealand actor

== See also ==
- Timothy Elliot-Murray-Kynynmound, 7th Earl of Minto (born 1953), British businessman and hereditary peer
