= Damien Ryan =

Damien Ryan may refer to:

- Damien Ryan (basketball)
- Damien Ryan (footballer)
- Damien Ryan (politician)
