= Cavedon =

Cavedon is a surname. Notable people with the surname include:

- Andrew Cavedon (born 1971), Australian rules footballer
- Giorgio Cavedon (1930–2001), Italian publisher, cartoonist, and screenwriter
