= 1993 WAFL season =

Australian rules football season

- Teams: 8
- Premiers: Claremont; 9th premiership
- Minor premiers: West Perth; 9th minor premiership
- Sandover Medallist: Neil Mildenhall (West Perth)
- Bernie Naylor Medallist: Jason Heatley (Subiaco)
- Matches played: 90

The 1993 WAFL season was the 109th of the various incarnations of the West Australian Football League. It saw an extraordinarily even competition amongst all the teams except Perth, with only three and a half games separating first and seventh and the smallest dispersion of winning percentages in the WAFL since 1921. West Perth's 13 wins and a percentage marginally under 100 is the fewest wins and lowest percentage to take top position in a major Australian Rules league: indeed no team had headed the ladder with a percentage nearly so low at any stage of a season except Hawthorn during May of 1969 and Perth during June and July 1963.

After early pacesetters Swan Districts and the inconsistent if at times brilliant South Fremantle collapsed in the second half of the season, the bottom two clubs of 1992 in West Perth (already decided on a move to Joondalup) and Claremont emerged as the favourites for the premiership as the home-and-away season and played off in the Grand Final, where the Falcons' lack of key forwards ensured their defeat. On an individual level, the season was highlighted by Subiaco's Diamond Valley recruit Jason Heatley, discarded by Fitzroy, kicking 111 goals in his first WAFL season and playing for the league after only five matches.

This season saw the WAFL adopt 20-minute quarters with extended time-on, a change to be introduced into the AFL for the following season.

== Home-and-away season ==
=== Round 1 ===
	Round 1
Saturday, 3 April (2:15 pm)	Subiaco 8.7 (55)	def. by	Claremont 14.14 (98)	Subiaco Oval (crowd: 2310)
Saturday, 3 April (2:15 pm)	West Perth 7.10 (52)	def. by	Swan Districts 13.6 (84)	Leederville Oval (crowd: 2727)
Saturday, 3 April (2:15 pm)	South Fremantle 13.11 (89)	def.	East Perth 5.6 (36)	Fremantle Oval (crowd: 2591)
Saturday, 3 April (2:15 pm)	Perth 10.10 (70)	def.	East Fremantle 10.6 (66)	Lathlain Park (crowd: 3005)
East Perth open the season with their lowest score since 1964, kicking only 1.5 to three-quarter time, the lowest in the WAFL since 1980.; The Lathlain Park match, at 86 minutes, is the shortest game in a major Australian Rules league.

=== Round 2 (Easter weekend) ===
	Round 2
Saturday, 10 April (2:15 pm)	Swan Districts 17.18 (120)	def.	South Fremantle 13.11 (89)	Bassendean Oval (crowd: 3567)
Saturday, 10 April (2:15 pm)	East Fremantle 21.8 (134)	def.	West Perth 12.13 (85)	East Fremantle Oval (crowd: 2960)
Monday, 12 April (2:15 pm)	East Perth 17.4 (106)	def.	Subiaco 13.12 (90)	Perth Oval (crowd: 2631)
Monday, 12 April (2:15 pm)	Claremont 13.10 (88)	def. by	Perth 14.6 (90)	Claremont Oval (crowd: 3026)

=== Round 3 ===
	Round 3
Saturday, 17 April (2:15 pm)	Swan Districts 16.16 (112)	def.	Subiaco 14.10 (94)	Bassendean Oval (crowd: 3061)
Saturday, 17 April (2:15 pm)	West Perth 13.10 (88)	def.	Perth 11.21 (87)	Leederville Oval (crowd: 2951)
Saturday, 17 April (2:15 pm)	South Fremantle 15.13 (103)	def.	East Fremantle 6.14 (50)	Fremantle Oval (crowd: 5283)
Saturday, 17 April (6:45 pm)	East Perth 10.12 (72)	drew with	Claremont 11.6 (72)	WACA (crowd: 3024)
Heatley, recruited from Diamond Valley, kicks seven goals on his Subiaco debut.; The draw at the WACA ended what was then (surpassed by East Fremantle during 2014) the longest sequence of matches by a WAFL club without a draw, being East Perth's first draw since Round 16 of 1969 or a gap of 518 matches.; It was the first WAFL (or AFL) draw at the WACA since Round 5, 1923 when Perth drew with East Fremantle.; Perth president Barry McGrath went into an outburst after the Demons' unexpected narrow defeat, saying their performances could not be tolerated and cancelling normal trophy presentations.

=== Round 4 (Anzac Day) ===
	Round 4
Saturday, 24 April (2:15 pm)	Perth 11.15 (81)	def. by	Swan Districts 13.8 (86)	Lathlain Park (crowd: 4873)
Sunday, 25 April (2:15 pm)	East Fremantle 13.14 (92)	def.	Claremont 13.10 (88)	East Fremantle Oval (crowd: 5300)
Monday, 26 April (2:15 pm)	South Fremantle 18.15 (123)	def.	Subiaco 15.15 (105)	Subiaco Oval (crowd: 3961)
Monday, 26 April (2:15 pm)	East Perth 6.9 (45)	def. by	West Perth 7.12 (54)	Perth Oval (crowd: 7000)
A watertight defence and impressive running football gives West Perth a surprise win in an extremely low-scoring dry-weather match despite scoring 3.9 (27) in the third quarter.

=== Round 5 ===
	Round 5
Saturday, 1 May (2:15 pm)	Claremont 9.12 (66)	def. by	Swan Districts 11.9 (75)	Claremont Oval (crowd: 2166)
Saturday, 1 May (2:15 pm)	Perth 13.13 (91)	def.	Subiaco 7.15 (57)	Lathlain Park (crowd: 2246)
Saturday, 1 May (2:15 pm)	East Perth 11.8 (74)	def. by	East Fremantle 18.9 (117)	Perth Oval (crowd: 2061)
Saturday, 1 May (6:45 pm)	West Perth 5.13 (43)	def. by	South Fremantle 9.11 (65)	WACA (crowd: 2287)
On a very wet and thundery Saturday, training lights are used at Perth Oval, where Andrew Lockyer gives a brilliant display at full-forward with eight goals.; A blackout prolonged the WACA match by seventeen minutes during which West Perth considered forfeiting as Marty Atkins was unstoppable in South's defence.

=== Round 6 ===
	Round 6
Saturday, 8 May (2:15 pm)	South Fremantle 17.10 (112)	def.	Perth 14.8 (92)	Fremantle Oval (crowd: 3377)
Saturday, 8 May (2:15 pm)	West Perth 18.7 (115)	def.	Claremont 15.11 (101)	Leederville Oval (crowd: 2759)
Saturday, 8 May (2:15 pm)	Swan Districts 13.21 (99)	def.	East Perth 5.9 (39)	Bassendean Oval (crowd: 3668)
Saturday, 8 May (2:15 pm)	Subiaco 20.14 (134)	def.	East Fremantle 11.12 (78)	Subiaco Oval (crowd: 2191)
East Perth's score was its lowest against Swan Districts until 1998, beating 6.10 (46) from 1974.

=== Round 7 ===
	Round 7
Saturday, 15 May (2:15 pm)	West Perth 10.12 (72)	def. by	Subiaco 19.20 (134)	WACA (crowd: 3237)
Saturday, 15 May (2:15 pm)	Claremont 12.10 (82)	def.	South Fremantle 7.10 (52)	Claremont Oval (crowd: 2798)
Saturday, 15 May (2:15 pm)	Perth 16.13 (109)	def.	East Perth 10.17 (77)	Lathlain Park (crowd: 3608)
Saturday, 15 May (2:15 pm)	East Fremantle 13.12 (90)	def. by	Swan Districts 15.9 (99)	East Fremantle Oval (crowd: 3126)
With Heatley kicking nine goals and making the WAFL team after his fifth match, Subiaco move off the bottom after a horror first five rounds.; Veteran Phil Narkle shows he has, despite being moved into defence, not lost his magic touch from the 1980s when after an accidental kick in the groin during the morning before the match, he drives Swans back from 34 points down to maintain their unbeaten record.

=== Round 8 ===
	Round 8
Saturday, 22 May (2:15 pm)	Swan Districts 14.10 (94)	def. by	West Perth 14.14 (98)	Bassendean Oval (crowd: 4390)
Saturday, 22 May (2:15 pm)	Claremont 13.12 (90)	def. by	Subiaco 16.12 (108)	Claremont Oval (crowd: 2529)
Saturday, 22 May (2:15 pm)	East Perth 12.11 (83)	def. by	South Fremantle 13.20 (98)	Perth Oval (crowd: 2516)
Saturday, 22 May (2:15 pm)	East Fremantle 24.12 (156)	def.	Perth 12.7 (79)	East Fremantle Oval (crowd: 3200)
A depleted Falcon side without Mildenhall, Turley, Zempilas, Peter Freeman, Paul Symmons and Dean Brunton is led by injury plagued centreman Darren O‘Brien to an upset over the previously unconquered Swans. O‘Brien kicked the winning goal after Swans stormed to the lead with seven final-quarter majors, but was also dubiously reported.; A brilliant ten-goal-to-one final quarter, with former Richmond rover Trent Nichols dominant, lifts East Fremantle to third at a critical time – they were behind for most of the first half and a loss would have seen them two games shy of the double chance.

=== Round 9 ===
	Round 9
Saturday, 29 May (6:45 pm)	Perth 14.12 (96)	def. by	Claremont 16.12 (108)	WACA (crowd: 3000)
Sunday, 30 May (2:15 pm)	South Fremantle 12.19 (91)	def. by	Swan Districts 16.5 (101)	Fremantle Oval (crowd: 4602)
Sunday, 30 May (2:15 pm)	Subiaco 27.9 (171)	def.	East Perth 7.19 (61)	Subiaco Oval (crowd: 2807)
Sunday, 30 May (2:15 pm)	West Perth 17.12 (114)	def.	East Fremantle 13.8 (86)	Leederville Oval (crowd: 3654)
Jason Heatley kicked twelve goals, a record for a Subiaco player against the Royals, and the first time a player had kicked twelve goals without a behind. It was also the first double-figure goal tally since John Hutton kicked thirteen for Claremont against South Fremantle in Round 19, 1991.; An explosive opening with four goals in as many minutes has Swans keeping an edge over their nearest rivals all game – despite the Bulldogs having ten more scoring shots, they never looked like winning.

=== Round 10 (Foundation Day) ===
	Round 10
Monday, 7 June (2:15 pm)	Perth 7.20 (62)	def. by	West Perth 20.15 (135)	Lathlain Park (crowd: 4213)
Monday, 7 June (2:15 pm)	Subiaco 26.13 (169)	def.	Swan Districts 19.16 (130)	Subiaco Oval (crowd: 5462)
Monday, 7 June (2:15 pm)	East Perth 12.9 (81)	def.	Claremont 9.13 (67)	Perth Oval (crowd: 2472)
Monday, 7 June (2:15 pm)	East Fremantle 14.9 (93)	def.	South Fremantle 15.10 (100)	East Fremantle Oval (crowd: 10386)
Five goals into a stiff northeasterly during the first quarter and the dominance of Rod Willet at centre half-forward gives Subiaco a fifth straight victory.

=== Round 11 ===
	Round 11
Saturday, 12 June (2:15 pm)	Swan Districts 16.24 (120)	def.	Perth 8.12 (60)	Bassendean Oval (crowd: 3227)
Saturday, 12 June (2:15 pm)	South Fremantle 29.23 (197)	def.	Subiaco 10.9 (69)	Fremantle Oval (crowd: 3646)
Saturday, 12 June (2:15 pm)	West Perth 7.15 (57)	def. by	East Perth 18.10 (118)	Leederville Oval (crowd: 4535)
Saturday, 12 June (2:15 pm)	Claremont 26.11 (167)	def.	East Fremantle 14.13 (97)	Claremont Oval (crowd: 2405)
Wally Matera, Brad Collard and Simon Taylor demoralise Subiaco with 31 scoring shots to five in the first half. It was the highest WA(S)FL score for three seasons.

=== Round 12 ===
	Round 12
Saturday, 19 June (2:15 pm)	West Perth 12.13 (85)	def.	South Fremantle 11.8 (74)	Leederville Oval (crowd: 3177)
Saturday, 19 June (2:15 pm)	Swan Districts 11.9 (75)	def. by	Claremont 21.13 (139)	Bassendean Oval (crowd: 3112)
Saturday, 19 June (2:15 pm)	Subiaco 16.23 (119)	def.	Perth 12.11 (83)	Subiaco Oval (crowd: 2296)
Saturday, 19 June (2:15 pm)	East Fremantle 15.14 (104)	def.	East Perth 12.13 (85)	East Fremantle Oval (crowd: 2530)
An emotional three-quarter time address allows West Perth, after being five goals behind midway through the third quarter, to overpower South Fremantle in the last forty minutes.

=== Round 13 ===
	Round 13
Saturday, 26 June (2:15 pm)	Claremont 8.6 (54)	def. by	West Perth 12.11 (83)	Claremont Oval (crowd: 1873)
Sunday, 27 June (2:15 pm)	Perth 10.13 (73)	def. by	South Fremantle 20.12 (132)	Lathlain Park (crowd: 1813)
Sunday, 27 June (2:15 pm)	East Perth 16.10 (106)	def. by	Swan Districts 9.9 (63)	Perth Oval (crowd: 2205)
Sunday, 27 June (2:15 pm)	East Fremantle 20.15 (135)	def.	Subiaco 12.11 (83)	East Fremantle Oval (crowd: 2216)
West Perth win at Claremont for the first time since 1986 as centre half-forward Derek Hall takes twelve marks in very difficult conditions, putting the three-time wooden spooners in line for a top three berth and off the top by percentage.

=== Round 14 ===
	Round 14
Saturday, 3 July (2:15 pm)	Subiaco 13.14 (92)	def. by	West Perth 14.13 (97)	Subiaco Oval (crowd: 3765)
Saturday, 3 July (2:15 pm)	South Fremantle 18.9 (117)	def. by	Claremont 24.7 (151)	Fremantle Oval (crowd: 3245)
Saturday, 3 July (2:15 pm)	East Perth 14.17 (101)	def.	Perth 8.13 (61)	Perth Oval (crowd: 2886)
Saturday, 3 July (2:15 pm)	Swan Districts 11.11 (77)	def. by	East Fremantle 15.9 (99)	Bassendean Oval (crowd: 2913)
West Perth achieve a second sensational comeback – from thirty-one points behind at the eighteen-minute mark of the final quarter – due to the individual skills of Darren Harris who consistently bullocked his way through at the centre bounces.; Despite a heavy dose of influenza, Tiger ruckman Clinton Wolf demolished the Bulldogs and is backed up by forwards Gerreyn and Morgan with six goals apiece.

=== Round 15 ===
	Round 15
Saturday, 10 July (2:15 pm)	West Perth 13.12 (90)	def. by	Swan Districts 16.10 (106)	Leederville Oval (crowd: 5024)
Saturday, 10 July (2:15 pm)	Subiaco 10.14 (74)	def. by	Claremont 12.13 (85)	Subiaco Oval (crowd: 2871)
Saturday, 10 July (2:15 pm)	South Fremantle 14.6 (90)	def. by	East Perth 17.9 (111)	Fremantle Oval (crowd: 3058)
Saturday, 10 July (2:15 pm)	Perth 8.13 (61)	def. by	East Fremantle 21.18 (144)	Lathlain Park (crowd: 1896)
Swan Districts reconsolidate top position with the first of two come-from-behind victories and South Fremantle's loss.; Eventual Simpson Medallist Dale Kickett shows against the potent Subiaco attack the form that was to make him a mainstay of Fremantle's defence, in the process making him feel he had been out of place in attack.

=== Round 16 ===
	Round 16
Saturday, 17 July (2:15 pm)	Swan Districts 11.15 (81)	def.	South Fremantle 11.14 (80)	Bassendean Oval (crowd: 4248)
Saturday, 17 July (2:15 pm)	Claremont 11.16 (82)	def. by	Perth 17.7 (109)	Claremont Oval (crowd: 1974)
Saturday, 17 July (2:15 pm)	East Perth 12.14 (86)	def. by	Subiaco 13.16 (94)	Perth Oval (crowd: 3113)
Saturday, 17 July (2:15 pm)	East Fremantle 6.12 (48)	def. by	West Perth 8.6 (54)	East Fremantle Oval (crowd: 3463)
A brilliant 40-possession display by 28-year-old defender Paul Mifka and several easy East Fremantle misses wins a low-scoring game for the Falcons, taking them to clear second.; A gamble by Perth coach Ken Armstrong to play out-of-form forward Mick Hastie at centre half-back, along with seven goals from Shane Cable, allows an accurate Perth to win for the first time since Round 7.

=== Round 17 ===
	Round 17
Saturday, 24 July (2:15 pm)	West Perth 19.16 (130)	def.	Perth 13.9 (87)	Leederville Oval (crowd: 3695)
Saturday, 24 July (2:15 pm)	Swan Districts 20.8 (128)	def.	Subiaco 20.6 (126)	Bassendean Oval (crowd: 3449)
Saturday, 24 July (2:15 pm)	Claremont 15.12 (102)	def.	East Perth 13.11 (89)	Claremont Oval (crowd: 2369)
Saturday, 24 July (2:15 pm)	South Fremantle 11.4 (70)	def. by	East Fremantle 19.14 (128)	Fremantle Oval (crowd: 6944)
Swan Districts' Jason Ball proves the difference in a thrilling spectacle with four goals in ten minutes after Subiaco coach Tony Solin reshuffles Georgiades and Langdon away from him.

=== Round 18 ===
	Round 18
Saturday, 31 July (2:15 pm)	East Fremantle 11.9 (75)	def. by	Claremont 15.13 (103)	East Fremantle Oval (crowd: 2283)
Sunday, 1 August (2:15 pm)	Subiaco 17.18 (120)	def.	South Fremantle 8.18 (66)	Subiaco Oval (crowd: 2696)
Sunday, 1 August (2:15 pm)	Perth 14.18 (102)	def.	Swan Districts 13.15 (93)	Lathlain Park (crowd: 2722)
Sunday, 1 August (2:15 pm)	East Perth 17.15 (117)	def.	West Perth 12.15 (87)	Perth Oval (crowd: 4915)
On a severely-criticised Subiaco surface, the Lions maintain their slim finals hopes as South Fremantle lose five on end, with four of their eight goals in a six-minute third quarter burst.; Perth record an unlikely win as they hold past tormentor Scott Cummings to one goal and namesake Steven dominates the last quarter with two critical goals.

=== Round 19 ===
	Round 19
Saturday, 7 August (2:15 pm)	South Fremantle 12.12 (84)	def.	West Perth 11.7 (73)	Fremantle Oval (crowd: 2707)
Saturday, 7 August (2:15 pm)	Claremont 18.16 (124)	def.	Swan Districts 8.8 (56)	Claremont Oval (crowd: 2475)
Saturday, 7 August (2:15 pm)	Perth 8.9 (57)	def. by	Subiaco 19.21 (135)	Lathlain Park (crowd: 1672)
Saturday, 7 August (2:15 pm)	East Perth 15.12 (102)	def.	East Fremantle 13.12 (90)	Perth Oval (crowd: 2249)
Chris Gerreyn, moved to the ruck when Clinton Wolf strains a hamstring, makes the most of his opportunity to have more freedom to move as Claremont's engine room allows Swans' weakened defence to be severely exploited.

=== Round 20 ===
	Round 20
Saturday, 14 August (2:15 pm)	South Fremantle 18.20 (128)	def.	Perth 9.6 (60)	Fremantle Oval (crowd: 2337)
Saturday, 14 August (2:15 pm)	West Perth 13.6 (84)	def.	Claremont 12.11 (83)	Leederville Oval (crowd: 3546)
Saturday, 14 August (2:15 pm)	Swan Districts 18.12 (120)	def.	East Perth 15.10 (100)	Bassendean Oval (crowd: 4000)
Saturday, 14 August (2:15 pm)	Subiaco 26.12 (168)	def.	East Fremantle 9.16 (70)	Subiaco Oval (crowd: 2640)
Andrew Donnelly's work as ruck-rover and later ruckman, along with eight goals from relegated Eagle Metropolis, virtually seals the five with a then-record Subiaco winning margin over the Sharks, beating 78 points from 1980.

=== Round 21 ===
	Round 21
Saturday, 21 August (2:15 pm)	Claremont 16.11 (107)	def.	South Fremantle 7.17 (59)	Claremont Oval (crowd: 2475)
Saturday, 21 August (2:15 pm)	Perth 7.11 (53)	def. by	East Perth 20.19 (139)	Lathlain Park (crowd: 1760)
Saturday, 21 August (2:15 pm)	East Fremantle 23.14 (152)	def.	Swan Districts 11.15 (81)	East Fremantle Oval (crowd: 2157)
Sunday, 22 August (2:15 pm)	West Perth 17.19 (121)	def.	Subiaco 10.16 (76)	Leederville Oval (crowd: 20112)
West Perth's farewell game to Leederville Oval (Note: Owing to redevelopment of Perth Oval for soccer club Perth Glory, East Perth moved to Leederville after the 1999 season.) provides a major dividend from the largest WAFL home-and-away attendance since Round 5, 1987.; Despite having lost eight matches, West Perth obtain the minor premiership via Swan Districts' thrashing, which led Shark coach Ken Judge to take a "shot" at his critics and John Todd to criticise his team's lack of endeavour.

== Ladder ==
1993 WAFL ladder
Pos	Team	Pld	W	L	D	PF	PA	PP	Pts
1	West Perth	21	13	8	0	1817	1831	99.2	52
2	Swan Districts	21	13	8	0	2000	2047	97.7	52
3	Claremont (P)	21	11	9	1	2057	1754	117.3	46
4	South Fremantle	21	11	10	0	2019	1863	108.4	44
5	Subiaco	21	10	11	0	2273	2086	109.0	40
6	East Fremantle	21	10	11	0	2104	1997	105.4	40
7	East Perth	21	9	11	1	1828	1887	96.9	38
8	Perth	21	6	15	0	1663	2296	72.4	24

Rules for classification: 1) points; 2) percentage; 3) number of points for.
(P) Premiers

== Finals ==
=== Elimination Final ===
	Elimination Final
Saturday, 28 August (2:15 pm)	South Fremantle 11.17 (83)	def. by	Subiaco 16.13 (109)	Subiaco Oval (crowd: 6,333)
An unexpected move of forward Andrew Macnish to roving shuts down a South Fremantle comeback when the Bulldogs take the lead for the first time in the match.

=== Qualifying Final ===
	Qualifying Final
Sunday, 29 August (2:15 pm)	Swan Districts 9.7 (61)	def. by	Claremont 12.12 (84)	WACA (crowd: 3,500)
It was the first WA(N)FL final at the WACA since the 1926 Grand Final, and the first not at Subiaco since the 1935 Grand Final.; Swan Districts' lack of rovers is severely exposed in wet conditions, so that Claremont was inevitably too strong.

=== Semi-finals ===
	First semi-final
Sunday, 5 September (11:45 am)	Swan Districts 18.8 (116)	def. by	Subiaco 20.15 (135)	Subiaco Oval (crowd: 13,187)
Subiaco, with Heatley kicking his hundredth goal, kick 16.4 (100) after an inaccurate first half, but need six of the last seven goals to give Swans their sixth consecutive finals defeat.

	Second semi-final
Sunday, 5 September (2:15 pm)	West Perth 14.7 (91)	def. by	Claremont 15.12 (102)	Subiaco Oval (crowd: 13,187)
Since the two semi-finals were played at the same venue on the same day, the attendance figure is the same.; Claremont kick four goals in seven minutes early in the last quarter to overcome their West Perth bogey from the home-and-away season against a team lacking 1992 Sandover winner Robbie West.

=== Preliminary final ===
	Preliminary final
Saturday, 11 September (2:15 pm)	West Perth 21.8 (134)	def.	Subiaco 15.12 (102)	Subiaco Oval (crowd: 11,325)
A best-on-ground performance by Robbie West (21 kicks, nine handballs, five goals) plus repeated time-on lapses by Subiaco, places West Perth despite Heatley's nine goals in its first Grand Final since 1975.

=== Grand Final ===
1993 WAFL Grand Final
Sunday, 19 September	Claremont	def.	West Perth	Subiaco Oval (crowd: 32,404)
5.4 (34); 10.7 (67); 10.10 (70); 13.14 (92)	Q1; Q2; Q3; Final	2.3 (15); 5.8 (38); 7.12 (54); 8.14 (62)	Umpires: Sam Kronja, Greg Scroop; Simpson Medal: Dale Kickett (Claremont)
Morgan 3, Klemm 3, Smith 2, Gerreyn 2, Mitchell, Kickett, Brendan Green	Goals	Mifka 2, O‘Brien, Curley, Jones, Hall, Burns, Trevor Green
Kickett (best on ground), Malone, Scott Edwards, Brendan Green, Gary Edwards, Hendry	Best	Harris, Nelson, Mifka, Jones, West, O‘Brien
Scott Edwards by field umpires Kronja and Scroop and emergency umpire Trevor Garrett for striking Darren Harris in second quarter Clinton Woolf by field umpire Scroop for striking Robbie West in second quarter	Reports	Andrew Nichols by goal umpire John Hauswirth for instigating a wrestle with Paul Morgan in the second quarter
Claremont's halfback and centrelines were too hard to penetrate for the Falcons, and Jeff Gieschen's inability to find key forwards ensures a win rated by Neesham as the most satisfying of his four as Tiger coach.
