= David Antonowicz =

Australian rules footballer

Personal information
- Full name: David Antonowicz
- Born: 1 June 1980 (age 46)
- Original team: Western Jets
- Height: 194 cm (6 ft 4 in)
- Weight: 93 kg (205 lb)

Playing career^{1}
Years	Club	Games (Goals)
2000	West Coast Eagles	3 (0)
- ^{1} Playing statistics correct to the end of 2000.

David Antonowicz (born 1 June 1980) is an Australian rules footballer who played three games for West Coast in the Australian Football League in 2000. Originally recruited from the Western Jets, Antonowicz struggled to gain a place in the Eagles side and spent most of his time playing in the West Australian Football League with Subiaco, Claremont and East Perth. He currently plays for Melton South in the Ballarat Football League
