= Glenn Nugent =

Australian rules footballer

Personal information
- Full name: Glenn Nugent
- Born: 8 November 1971 (age 54)
- Original team: Mentone Grammar
- Height: 180 cm (5 ft 11 in)
- Weight: 80 kg (176 lb)

Playing career^{1}
Years	Club	Games (Goals)
1990–1994	Hawthorn	24 (11)
1995	St Kilda	11 (1)
Total		35 (12)
- ^{1} Playing statistics correct to the end of 1995.

Glenn Nugent (born 8 November 1971) is a former Australian rules footballer who played with Hawthorn and St Kilda in the Australian Football League (AFL) during the 1990s.

Nicknamed Teddles, Nugent was a left footed wingman and kicked two goals from 21 disposals on his AFL debut in 1990. He played three further games that year and another six in 1991, when Hawthorn finished premiers. After just one appearance in 1992, the Mentone Grammar recruit put together nine games in 1993 and averaged 20 disposals for the year.

In the 1994 AFL draft he was traded to St Kilda in return for pick 59, used on Nathan Saunders, but played just one season at his new club.
