= Shane Sikora =

Australian rules footballer

Personal information
- Full name: Shane Sikora
- Born: 11 March 1977 (age 49)
- Original team: Murray Bushrangers
- Draft: 12th, 1994 AFL draft
- Height: 178 cm (5 ft 10 in)
- Weight: 78 kg (172 lb)

Playing career^{1}
Years	Club	Games (Goals)
1996, 1998	West Coast Eagles	3 (0)
- ^{1} Playing statistics correct to the end of 1998.

Shane Sikora (born 11 March 1977) is a former Australian rules footballer who played with the West Coast Eagles in the Australian Football League (AFL).

West Coast recruited the Murray Bushrangers player with the 12th selection of the 1994 AFL draft, which they had received from Collingwood for Lee Walker. A wingman, he did not make his AFL debut until late in the 1996 season, against Essendon at Subiaco, in which he kicked two behinds and had eight disposals. He played again the following week but had to wait almost two years to make his third appearance, instead spending most of his time with Perth in the WAFL.
