= Ben Wilson (Australian footballer) =

Australian rules footballer

Personal information
- Full name: Ben Wilson
- Born: 25 February 1977 (age 49)
- Original team: Norwood (SANFL)
- Draft: 9th, 1994 AFL draft
- Height: 191 cm (6 ft 3 in)
- Weight: 87 kg (192 lb)
- Position: half back/forward

Playing career^{1}
Years	Club	Games (Goals)
1996	Collingwood	2 (0)
1997	Sydney Swans	4 (0)
Total		6 (0)
- ^{1} Playing statistics correct to the end of 1997.

Ben Wilson (born 25 February 1977) is a former Australian rules footballer who played with Collingwood and the Sydney Swans in the Australian Football League (AFL).

Wilson was secured by Collingwood from South Australian National Football League (SANFL) club Norwood in the 1994 AFL draft with the ninth selection, the first not from a TAC Cup side. The South Australian did not feature in the 1995 AFL season and appeared twice for Collingwood in 1996.

He was traded to Sydney at the end of 1996, along with Mark Orchard and two draft picks, for which Collingwood received Anthony Rocca. He played in the opening three rounds of the 1997 AFL season but made only one further appearance.

Following his delisting by Sydney, Wilson returned to Norwood, making his senior SANFL debut in 1999.

== Politics ==
Wilson was announced as the Dignity Party candidate to represent the electorate of Dunstan in the eastern suburbs of Adelaide at the 2018 state election.
