= Lee Walker (footballer) =

Australian rules footballer

Personal information
- Full name: Lee Walker
- Born: 7 February 1973 (age 53)
- Original team: East Perth (WAFL)
- Draft: 19th, 1992 AFL draft
- Height: 197 cm (6 ft 6 in)
- Weight: 97 kg (214 lb)

Playing career^{1}
Years	Club	Games (Goals)
1993–1994	West Coast Eagles	0 (0)
1995–1999	Collingwood	16 (13)
- ^{1} Playing statistics correct to the end of 1999.

Lee Walker (born 7 February 1973) is a former Australian rules footballer who played with Collingwood in the Australian Football League (AFL).

Originally from Busselton, Walker represented Western Australia in the Teal Cup and was selected in the Under-18 All-Australian team. Due to a knee injury, however, he was unable to make any senior appearances for the West Coast Eagles. Collingwood gave up the 12th selection of the 1994 AFL draft to secure Walker, a pick which the Eagles used on Shane Sikora.

He continued to be hampered by injuries at Collingwood but was able to play 16 AFL games in three seasons from 1995 to 1997. A key position player, he had a total of three knee reconstructions during his career. After being delisted he nominated for the 1998 AFL draft and was re-signed by Collingwood, but he would only play reserves matches.

Since retiring, Walker has remained involved in football as both a Player Development Manager and as a player manager.
