= Dean Matthews =

Australian rules footballer

Personal information
- Full name: Dean Matthews
- Born: 21 July 1971 (age 55)
- Original teams: Bulleen-Templestowe, (VAFA)
- Draft: No. 43, 1994 AFL draft

Playing career^{1}
Years	Club	Games (Goals)
1995	St Kilda	1 (0)
- ^{1} Playing statistics correct to the end of 1995.

Dean Matthews (born 21 July 1971) is a former Australian rules footballer who played for St Kilda in the Australian Football League (AFL) in 1995. He was recruited from the Bulleen-Templestowe Football Club in the Victorian Amateur Football Association (VAFA) with the 43rd selection in the 1994 AFL draft.

After playing with St Kilda, Dean returned to Bulleen-Templestowe to play more than 300 senior games for his club. Matthews played in two senior premierships with the Bullants (2004 and 2008) and captained the club for seven years, including captain/coaching in 2001. Matthews holds the club record for senior games, being ahead of Dean Tulloch and Paul Robertson.

Matthews represented the VAFA 12 times, including four as captain.

Matthews' daughter Caitlin Matthews was recruited by St Kilda under the father/daughter rule prior to the 2022 AFLW season.
