= Robert Di Rosa =

Australian rules footballer

Personal information
- Full name: Robert Di Rosa
- Born: 4 July 1977 (age 49)
- Original team: Western Jets (TAC Cup)
- Draft: No. 18, 1994 AFL draft

Playing career^{1}
Years	Club	Games (Goals)
1995	Geelong	3 (0)
- ^{1} Playing statistics correct to the end of 1995.

Robert Di Rosa (born 4 July 1977) is a former Australian rules footballer who played for Geelong in the Australian Football League (AFL) in 1995. He was recruited from the Western Jets in the TAC Cup with the 18th selection in the 1994 AFL draft.
