= Daryl Griffin =

Australian rules footballer

Personal information
- Full name: Daryl Griffin
- Born: 23 January 1976 (age 50)
- Original team: Western Jets
- Draft: No. 28, 1993 National Draft
- Height: 180 cm (5 ft 11 in)
- Weight: 80 kg (176 lb)

Playing career^{1}
Years	Club	Games (Goals)
1995–1996	Footscray	18 (0)
- ^{1} Playing statistics correct to the end of 1996.

Daryl Griffin (born 23 January 1976) is a former Australian rules footballer who played with Footscray in the Australian Football League (AFL).

Griffin was initially drafted by the Sydney Swans. They selected him with pick 28 in the 1993 National Draft, from the Western Jets. A half back, Griffin crossed to Footscray at the end of 1994. He played 14 games in the 1995 AFL season, including Footscray's qualifying final loss to Geelong.
