= Tim Scott (hurler) =

Irish hurler

Timothy Scott (24 January 1895 – 1 May 1972) was an Irish hurler. He was a substitute on the Kilkenny senior hurling team that won the 1922 All-Ireland Championship.

== Honours ==
Kilkenny

- All-Ireland Senior Hurling Championship (1): 1922
- Leinster Senior Hurling Championship (2): 1922, 1923
