= Chad Liddell =

Australian rules footballer

Personal information
- Full name: Chad Liddell
- Born: 21 January 1977 (age 49)
- Original team: Southern Stingrays
- Draft: 30th overall, 1994
- Height: 185 cm (6 ft 1 in)
- Weight: 80 kg (176 lb)

Playing career^{1}
Years	Club	Games (Goals)
1995–98	Collingwood	29 (15)
- ^{1} Playing statistics correct to the end of 1998.

Chad Liddell (born 21 January 1977) is a former Australian rules footballer who played for Collingwood in the Australian Football League (AFL) during the 1990s.

Liddell played his early football at Mentone Grammar and with the Southern Stingrays. After being recruited with pick 30 in the 1994 AFL draft, Liddell was used initially by Collingwood as a forward but developed into a half back flanker. He kicked two goals and had 21 disposals in a win over St Kilda at the MCG in his first season but in four years at the club was in and out of the seniors.

He joined Sandringham after being delisted. He played ten seasons for Sandringham from 1999 until 2008, playing 168 games and kicking 95 goals, and serving as captain from 2004 until 2007. He won four premierships with Sandringham, including three as captain, in 2000, 2004, 2005 and 2006. He won the club best and fairest in 2002, was awarded life membership of Sandringham in 2009, and was inducted into the club's Hall of Fame in 2014.
