= David Bourke =

Australian rules footballer

Personal information
- Born: 9 January 1976 (age 50)
- Original team: Central/Xavier College
- Debut: Round 2, 1995, Richmond vs. St Kilda, at Waverley Park
- Height: 194 cm (6 ft 4 in)
- Weight: 80 kg (176 lb)

Playing career^{1}
| Years | Club | Games (Goals) |
| 1995–2001 | Richmond | 85 (18) |
| 2002–2003 | Kangaroos | 1 (1) |
| Total | | 86 (19) |
- ^{1} Playing statistics correct to the end of 2003.

Career highlights
- AFL Rising Star nominee: 1995

David Bourke (born 9 January 1976) is a former Australian rules footballer who played 85 games for the Richmond Football Club, kicking 18 goals and one game player, kicking 1 goal for the Kangaroos. He is the son of Richmond champion Francis Bourke and grandson of 1940s Richmond player Frank Bourke, the only three generation family at the club in VFL/AFL history. David was Selected by Richmond in the 1994 AFL draft via the father–son rule. His career suffered from an inability to bulk up to a heavier weight, and he was frustratingly inconsistent. David inherited his father's fanatical desire to win the ball; however, his body was not built to take the punishment that this approach entailed. After 85 games in seven seasons, David Bourke was traded to the Kangaroos for the 2002 season, but only managed one game in blue and white.

In 2008 the Tigers centenary year David was nominated for "Mark of the Century" in which he took a massive hanger, against Essendon at the MCG in the 1996 season.
