= Tony Brown (Australian rules footballer) =

Australian rules footballer, born 1977

Personal information
- Full name: Tony Brown
- Born: 28 May 1977 (age 49)
- Original team: Geelong Falcons
- Height: 175 cm (5 ft 9 in)
- Weight: 79 kg (174 lb)

Playing career^{1}
Years	Club	Games (Goals)
1995–2000	St Kilda	108 (62)
- ^{1} Playing statistics correct to the end of 2000.

Tony Brown (born 28 May 1977) is a former professional Australian rules footballer who has played in the Australian Football League (AFL) and the South Australian National Football League (SANFL).

He had to make the choice between cricket and football after representing Victoria in under age cricket. Originally from the Geelong Falcons, Brown was drafted by St Kilda Football Club at the 1994 AFL draft and made his senior AFL debut in 1995. Playing as a rover, Brown was a hard-running player, and was a committed and whole hearted individual who was greatly respected within the club.

Brown played in St Kilda’s 1996 AFL Ansett Australia Cup winning side.

Brown played in 21 of 22 matches in the 1997 AFL season home and away rounds in which St Kilda Football Club qualified in first position for the finals, winning the club’s second Minor Premiership and first McClelland Trophy.

At the end of the 2000 AFL season, Brown left St Kilda after 108 games and 62 goals, moving to SANFL club Port Adelaide Magpies, where he became captain, and in 2001 was the joint winner of the Magarey Medal for the SANFL best and fairest player. Brown quit Port Adelaide at the end of 2005 to return to Victoria for family reasons and signed to play with Leopold Football club where he won the GFL best and fairest award before he signed with Victorian Amateur Football Association (VAFA) club Old Haileybury where he again won the competition best and fairest.

In 2011, Brown signed on to become a runner for AFL club Collingwood. He then moved to St. Kilda Football Club later in the year as runner before becoming Player Development Manager.

He also taught at Sandringham East primary school, Haileybury College and Christian College Geelong.
