= Tim Elliott (footballer) =

Australian rules footballer

Personal information
- Full name: Tim Elliott
- Born: 12 September 1976 (age 50)
- Original team: Gippsland Power
- Draft: 26th, 1994 National Draft
- Height: 198 cm (6 ft 6 in)
- Weight: 93 kg (205 lb)

Playing career^{1}
Years	Club	Games (Goals)
1998–2001	St Kilda	47 (10)
- ^{1} Playing statistics correct to the end of 2001.

Tim Elliott (born 12 September 1976) is a former Australian rules footballer who played with St Kilda in the Australian Football League (AFL).

Elliott was a key defender and ruckman, originally from Lucknow Football Club in East Gippsland. Picked by St Kilda in the 1994 National Draft from the Gippsland Power, Elliott was restricted to the reserves in his first few years at the club. He had to wait until the 1998 AFL season to appear in the seniors. In 1999 he had his best year at the club, with 19 appearances. He earned the only Brownlow Medal vote of his career in round three that season, when he replaced a suspended Peter Everitt in the ruck.
