= Justin Charles =

Australian rules footballer

Personal information
- Born: 28 September 1970 (age 56); Richmond
- Original team: North Footscray Juniors
- Height: 198 cm (6 ft 6 in)
- Weight: 97 kg (214 lb)

Playing career^{1}
Years	Club	Games (Goals)
1989–1993	Footscray	36 (24)
1995–1998	Richmond	54 (38)
Total		90 (62)
- ^{1} Playing statistics correct to the end of 1998.

Justin Charles (born 28 September 1970) is a former Australian rules footballer who played for Footscray and Richmond in the VFL/AFL.

== Footscray career ==
Charles was recruited to the Footscray Football Club after winning an under-19s best and fairest with them, and his father John R. Charles, as well as his uncle Norm Charles had played for the club in the past. He made his debut in 1989, however in the five seasons he spent at the club until 1993, he never could consolidate a position with spots for big players of his type competitive. Terry Wheeler, then coach of the Bulldogs, was willing to put him up for trade, however Charles quit the club and took a year off from football. He had played only 36 games for 24 goals with the club.

== Richmond career ==
Charles took a year off football in 1994, in frustration, when he turned his hand to baseball, playing in the minor league with the Florida Marlins.

The former plumber was surprisingly picked up in the 1994 AFL draft by Richmond and immediately impressed the club with his work ethic. He became a prominent ruckman and in 1996's Brownlow Medal he polled 17 votes, with Michael Voss and James Hird, the winners, polling only four more.

== Drugs controversy ==
Late in the 1997 AFL season, Charles became the first player to test positive to an anabolic steroid, boldenone. The AFL tribunal suspended him for 16 matches, as there was not an anti-drug policy in place at the time. Charles made a return to AFL football late in 1998 but injury led to his retirement shortly after, finishing with 54 games and 38 goals for the Tigers.

== See also ==
- List of sportspeople sanctioned for doping offences
