= Peter Bird (footballer) =

Australian rules footballer (born 1976)

Personal information
- Full name: Peter Bird
- Born: 30 January 1976 (age 50)
- Original team: Geelong U18s
- Draft: 58th, 1994 National Draft
- Height: 176 cm (5 ft 9 in)
- Weight: 73 kg (161 lb)

Playing career^{1}
Years	Club	Games (Goals)
1995–1996	Fitzroy	15 (7)
- ^{1} Playing statistics correct to the end of 1996.

Peter Bird (born 30 January 1976) is a former Australian rules footballer who played with Fitzroy in the Australian Football League (AFL).

Bird was selected by Fitzroy with pick 58 of the 1994 National Draft, from the Geelong Falcons.

He made twelve appearances in the 1995 AFL season and a further three in 1996. From 1997 to 2002, Bird played for Subiaco, then moved to South Bunbury in the South West Football League.

In 2004, after he had been cleared from the Lions, Bird was involved in a unique controversy when South Bunbury cleared him to Peel Thunder for one game against East Perth in the second round, but the Thunder, desperate after winning only one game in 2003, played him in their opening game with Claremont. After a vote of WAFL clubs, Peel had the 10.10 (70) they scored in that opening game wiped from their total (and Claremont’s Points "Against") for the season on 14 April, thus having officially the lowest score in the WAFL since Subiaco failed to score a single point against South Fremantle in 1906.

Bird was to play two seasons with the Thunder before retiring at the end of 2005.
