= Shannon Grant =

Australian rules footballer, born 1977

Personal information
- Full name: Shannon Grant
- Born: 19 April 1977 (age 49)
- Original team: Flemington / Western U18
- Draft: No. 3, 1994 national draft
- Height: 178 cm (5 ft 10 in)
- Weight: 84 kg (185 lb)
- Positions: Small forward, midfielder

Playing career^{1}
Years	Club	Games (Goals)
1995–1997	Sydney	58 (38)
1998–2008	North Melbourne	243 (323)
Total		301 (361)
- ^{1} Playing statistics correct to the end of 2008.

Career highlights
- Kangaroos best and fairest 2001; Norm Smith Medal 1999; Kangaroos premiership side 1999; All-Australian 2005; AFL Rising Star nominee 1996; International Rules 2005

Shannon Grant (born 19 April 1977) is a former Australian rules footballer who was a midfielder in the AFL. He began his career at the Sydney Swans in 1995 before moving to the Kangaroos in 1998 and being a part of their 1999 premiership side, in which he also won the Norm Smith Medal for best on ground. In 1996, he played for Sydney against North Melbourne in the Grand Final.

In the 2005 season, Grant was involved in numerous comeback victories by the Kangaroos. The first was in Round 2 against the Sydney Swans, at Manuka Oval. Trailing by 17 points at 3 quarter time, Grant and his team mates lifted with Grant kicking three goals to help the Roos to a convincing win. The following week against St Kilda, the Roos again lifted from a 3rd quarter shocker, trailing against the highly fancied St Kilda which had not lost a game at Docklands Stadium since 2003. Grant once again kicked four goals in the last quarter to defeat the Saints by seven points (100 to 93). In Round 19, the Kangaroos trailed by three goals with four minutes to play against Collingwood at Telstra Dome.

Grant announced his retirement on 26 August 2008. The following Saturday, he played the 300th game of his career. His 301st and last game of AFL football was an elimination final against his former club, the Sydney Swans, at ANZ Stadium in Sydney, which the Kangaroos lost by 35 points. Grant was given a standing ovation by both Sydney and North Melbourne players as he left the ground for the final time.

Grant coached the Frankston Football Club for one season in the Victorian Football League (VFL) in 2009.

At season end of 2009, he was appointed coach of the struggling Bendigo Bombers for 2010, also in the VFL.

Grant joined the Western Bulldogs' coaching panel as an assistant coach for 2012 after two seasons at Essendon.

In 2015, Grant coached the senior team at Greenvale Football Club in the Essendon District Football League. The team played off in the grand final, losing to Aberfeldie Football Club.

In June 2018, Grant was sentenced to six months in prison for assaulting his former partner. The sentence was overturned on appeal, and he was ordered to complete 200 hour of community service.

== Playing statistics ==
Legend
G	Goals	K	Kicks	D	Disposals	T	Tackles
B	Behinds	H	Handballs	M	Marks
#	Played in that season's premiership team

Season	Team	No.	Games	Totals							Averages (per game)						
Season	Team	No.	Games	G	B	K	H	D	M	T	G	B	K	H	D	M	T
1995	Sydney	9	10	9	10	80	47	127	38	11	0.9	1.0	8.0	4.7	12.7	3.8	1.1
1996	Sydney	9	25	11	8	276	154	430	104	43	0.4	0.3	11.0	6.2	17.2	4.2	1.7
1997	Sydney	9	23	18	13	233	108	341	64	27	0.8	0.6	10.1	4.7	14.8	2.8	1.2
1998	North Melbourne	6	25	46	16	261	137	398	70	35	1.8	0.6	10.4	5.5	15.9	2.8	1.4
1999^{#}	Kangaroos	6	24	37	11	310	181	491	110	27	1.5	0.5	12.9	7.5	20.5	4.6	1.1
2000	Kangaroos	6	25	29	18	304	131	435	127	28	1.2	0.7	12.2	5.2	17.4	5.1	1.1
2001	Kangaroos	6	20	26	21	315	164	479	101	46	1.3	1.1	15.8	8.2	24.0	5.1	2.3
2002	Kangaroos	6	20	12	17	227	125	352	76	33	0.6	0.9	11.4	6.3	17.6	3.8	1.7
2003	Kangaroos	6	20	22	23	287	159	446	108	41	1.1	1.2	14.4	8.0	22.3	5.4	2.1
2004	Kangaroos	6	22	23	18	273	194	467	89	55	1.0	0.8	12.4	8.8	21.2	4.0	2.5
2005	Kangaroos	6	23	39	24	296	135	431	122	29	1.7	1.0	12.9	5.9	18.7	5.3	1.3
2006	Kangaroos	6	18	21	18	247	109	356	127	31	1.2	1.0	13.7	6.1	19.8	7.1	1.7
2007	Kangaroos	6	25	39	21	281	137	418	135	40	1.6	0.8	11.2	5.5	16.7	5.4	1.6
2008	North Melbourne	6	21	29	17	209	129	338	111	41	1.4	0.8	10.0	6.1	16.1	5.3	2.0
Career			301	361	235	3599	1910	5509	1382	487	1.2	0.8	12.0	6.3	18.3	4.6	1.6

== Honours and achievements ==
Team

- AFL premiership player (North Melbourne/Kangaroos): 1999
- McClelland Trophy (Sydney): 1996
- Syd Barker Trophy (North Melbourne): 2001

Individual

- Norm Smith Medal: 1999
- Syd Barker Medal: 2001
- All-Australian team: 2005
- Australian international rules football team: 2005
- AFL Rising Star nominee: 1996 (Round 6)
