= John Rombotis =

Australian rules footballer (born 1976)

Personal information
- Full name: John Rombotis
- Born: 13 October 1976 (age 50)
- Original team: Central U-18s
- Draft: 23rd overall, 1994 AFL draft
- Height: 181 cm (5 ft 11 in)
- Weight: 85 kg (187 lb)

Playing career^{1}
Years	Club	Games (Goals)
1995–1996	Fitzroy	26 (16)
1997	Port Adelaide	9 (5)
1998–2000	Richmond	13 (2)
Total		48 (23)
- ^{1} Playing statistics correct to the end of 2000.

John Rombotis (born 13 October 1976) is a former Australian rules footballer who played for Fitzroy, Port Adelaide and Richmond in the Australian Football League (AFL).

Rombotis, originally from Caulfield Grammar school, played at both the Sandringham Dragons and Central U-18s before being recruited to Fitzroy with pick 23 in the 1994 AFL draft.

== AFL career ==
=== Fitzroy career (1995–1996) ===
After four appearances in 1995, Rombotis managed to play every single game the following season, but it was a poor year for Fitzroy, and he experienced just one win. He gathered the only two Brownlow Medal votes of his career for a 29-disposal effort against Carlton.

=== Port Adelaide career (1997) ===
Instead of joining the Brisbane Lions in 1997, Rombotis made his way to the competition's other new club, Port Adelaide, which picked up Rombotis with the sixth pick of the 1996 AFL draft. He struggled to make an impact in his only year at the club and was traded to Richmond for Chris Naish.

=== Richmond career (1998–2000) ===
In three seasons, Rombotis was not able to get regular games and after an injury riddled season in 2000, was delisted.

=== Post AFL career ===
After leaving the AFL, Rombotis continued to play metropolitan football and had stints as coach of Belgrave and Roxburgh Park. He was also vice-captain of St Kevin's Old Boys in 2004 when they won the VAFA B Section premiership.

== See also ==
- List of Caulfield Grammar School people
