= Todd McHardy =

Australian rules footballer (born 1977)

Personal information
- Full name: Todd McHardy
- Born: 6 April 1977 (age 49)
- Original team: Keilor Park / Western Jets
- Draft: 76th overall, 1994 National Draft (Melbourne)
- Height: 183 cm (6 ft 0 in)
- Weight: 82 kg (181 lb)
- Position: Half-forward / Half-back

Playing career^{1}
Years	Club	Games (Goals)
1995–1997	Melbourne	5 (1)
- ^{1} Playing statistics correct to the end of 1997.

Todd McHardy (born 6 April 1977) is a former Australian rules footballer who played for Melbourne Football Club in the Australian Football League (AFL).

== Early life ==
Originally from Keilor Park in the Essendon District Football League, McHardy played for the Western Jets in the under-18 TAC Cup competition. In conjunction with playing for the Jets, McHardy also represented the Victorian Metro team at the 1994 AFL Under 18 Championships. Known throughout his junior career as quick half-forward who could take a good mark, McHardy was drafted by Melbourne with the 76th selection in the 1994 National Draft, with Melbourne coach Neil Balme stating that the club had placed "an emphasis on speed" when considering whom to select in the 1994 Draft.

== AFL career ==
McHardy injured his knee playing for Melbourne's reserves team in the 1995 pre-season, and after recovering from the injury, was unable to break into Melbourne's senior side for the rest of the season, instead playing every match in the reserves. After starting the 1996 season playing with the reserves, McHardy was called up for his first senior match in round 7, against Sydney. Playing as a forward pocket, McHardy had an average AFL debut, gathering nine possessions in a losing side. He retained his place in the team for the next two matches, even kicking a goal in round 8 against Hawthorn, but was dropped back to the reserves after a possessionless performance against Essendon in round 9. McHardy was unable to break back into the senior team and finished 1996 with three AFL matches.

In 1997, McHardy again began the season playing with the reserves. He injured his hand in April and missed a month of football as a result. After recovering, he was named in the squad for Melbourne's match against Adelaide, but was not required to play. Two weeks later, McHardy played his first match of the season in Melbourne's loss to the Brisbane Lions. He kept his place in the side for the Demons' next match against Hawthorn, but was omitted the following week. After managing only five games in three years at the club, Melbourne delisted McHardy at the conclusion of the 1997 season.

== Post-AFL career ==
After being delisted, McHardy nominated for the 1997 National Draft, but no team chose to select him. McHardy subsequently played for Williamstown Football Club in 1998.

== BlueFit ==
In 2007, McHardy founded BlueFit, a national leisure management company that now operates more than 70 sport and recreation facilities across Australia and employs over 3,000 staff. Under his leadership, BlueFit has become a recognised industry leader in the delivery of community-focused aquatic, health, and recreation services.

Todd has been a strong advocate for innovative leisure design, promoting accessible and engaging facilities that encourage greater participation in sport and physical activity within local communities. He has also been at the forefront of technology adoption in the sector, leading the implementation of Australia’s first commercial AI-powered pool supervision systems to enhance safety and operational efficiency in aquatic centres.

Through the BlueFit Swimming brand, the organisation teaches more than 60,000 children every week how to swim, helping to build vital water safety skills and confidence in the next generation. In addition, the BlueFit Foundation delivers programs and initiatives that support youth development and strengthen community wellbeing through accessible recreation and support services.
