= David Muir (Australian footballer) =

Australian rules footballer (born 1971)

Personal information
- Full name: David Eugene Muir
- Born: 17 July 1971 (age 55)
- Original team: Claremont (WAFL)
- Debut: Round 1, 1995, Fremantle vs. Richmond, at the MCG

Playing career^{1}
Years	Club	Games (Goals)
1991–1996	Claremont	49 (42)
1995–1996	Fremantle	20 (2)
Total		69 (44)
- ^{1} Playing statistics correct to the end of 1996.

David Eugene Muir (born 17 July 1971) is an Australian rules footballer who played for the Fremantle Dockers between 1995 and 1996.

He was originally drafted from Claremont in the WAFL to the West Coast Eagles for the 1993 season, before being delisted without playing a league game. He was then drafted by the North Melbourne Football Club, where again he didn't play a league game and was delisted. He was then selected as a predraft selection in the 1994 AFL draft by Fremantle and played 20 games over two seasons mainly as a defender.

After retiring from football, Muir became a big-wave surfer and stand up paddle surfing. He won an event at Sapinus in Tahiti, and competed in the Stand Up World tour, finishing each year between 2010 and 2012 in the top twenty, with eighth place in 2010 his best overall result.
