= Marty Warry =

Australian rules footballer, born 1977

Personal information
- Born: 5 January 1977 (age 49)
- Original team: Central U18
- Debut: Round 19, 13 August 1995, Fitzroy vs. Sydney Swans, at Western Oval

Playing career^{1}
Years	Club	Games (Goals)
1995–1996	Fitzroy	8 (11)
- ^{1} Playing statistics correct to the end of 1996.

Martin Warry (born 5 January 1977) is a former Australian rules footballer.

Recruited from Central U18s in the 1994 AFL draft, Warry made his debut with the Fitzroy Football Club in 1995. He went on to play only 8 games and kick 11 goals with the Roys and was known as a forward with an exceptional leap and a touch of flair. One of those goals he kicked was the last one ever scored for the Roys in the AFL, in their Round 22, 1996 game against Fremantle. He booted 4 for the game.

Warry was drafted by Collingwood signing a 2yr deal following the takeover of Fitzroy's AFL operations by the Brisbane Bears, but quit the club mid-season, due to a lack of opportunities from then coach Tony Shaw.
