= Anthony Rocca =

Australian rules footballer, born 1977

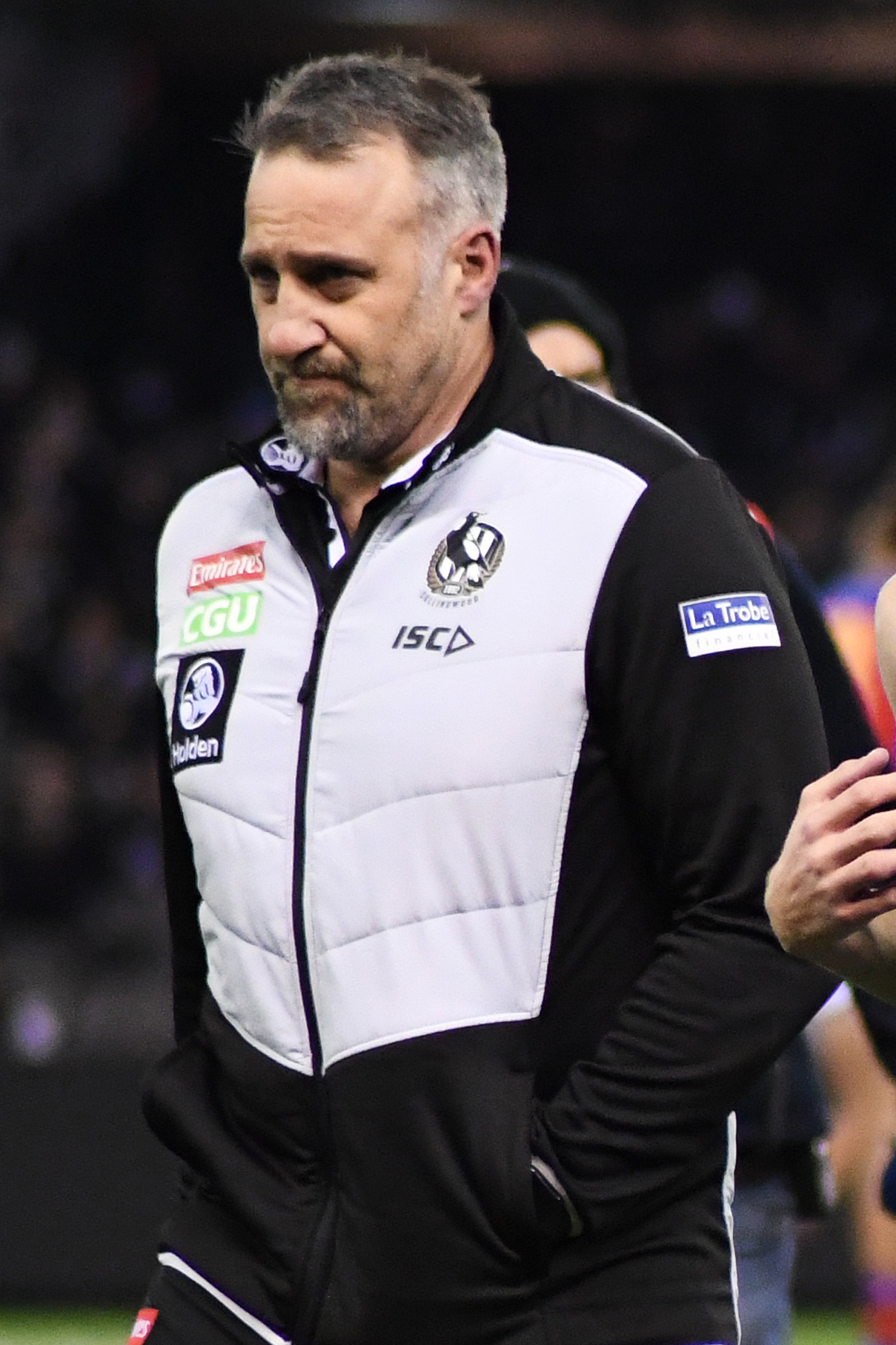
- Rocca in August 2018

Personal information
- Full name: Anthony Rocca
- Nickname: Pebbles
- Born: 15 August 1977 (age 49)
- Original team: Reservoir-Lakeside/Northern Knights
- Draft: 2nd overall, 1994 AFL draft (Sydney)
- Height: 195 cm (6 ft 5 in)
- Weight: 104 kg (229 lb)
- Position: Forward

Playing career^{1}
Years	Club	Games (Goals)
1995–1996	Sydney	22 (11)
1997–2009	Collingwood	220 (404)
Total		242 (415)
- ^{1} Playing statistics correct to the end of 2009.

Career highlights
- Gordon Coventry Trophy (2000, 2002, 2006, 2007); RT Rush Trophy (2nd Best and Fairest) 1999; Darren Millane Trophy (Best Clubman) 2002; Jason McCartney Medal 2003

Anthony Rocca (born 15 August 1977) is a former Australian rules footballer who has played with the Sydney Swans and Collingwood in the Australian Football League.

== Early life ==
Hailing from Reservoir, Victoria, Rocca grew up as a Collingwood Magpies supporter.

== Sydney ==
Rocca was rated very highly as a youngster and was selected with the second overall pick in the 1994 AFL draft by the Sydney Swans. He debuted in round 8, 1995, against Carlton, in a match which saw the Swans win by 72 points and Tony Lockett kick eight goals. He was reportedly homesick during his time at the Swans.

== Collingwood ==
After two seasons at the Swans, Rocca was traded to his preferred home, Collingwood. Rocca was traded for fellow 1994 draftee full forward Ben Wilson, Mark Orchard and Collingwood's first two draft selections. The trade was controversially allowed to be submitted almost three hours after the trading deadline, as Wilson and Orchard were holidaying in Mauritius and were unable to be contacted in time. He made a name for himself as a strong forward, with a booming 70+ metre kick, just like his brother. However, unlike his brother, Anthony was also used in the ruck. His importance to the Magpies' forward structure was crucial, and he led the team's goalkicking, albeit with 38 goals in the year his team made a Grand Final in 2002. In 2003, with the Magpies again facing Brisbane in the Grand Final, Rocca was suspended in the Preliminary Final against Port Adelaide, shattering his dream of playing in another Grand Final. Without Rocca, the Magpies' forward line structure was completely changed from the one that had been so successful throughout 2003, and by coincidence or not, Collingwood lost the match by 50 points.

In 2004 he missed 7 matches with injuries, and fared even worse in 2005, snapping an achilles tendon during the Round 4 clash with the Kangaroos, ruling him out for the rest of the season.

During the 2006 season Rocca returned to the side and proved important to the Magpies' structure up forward. In the Round 2 match against Hawthorn, he booted 8 goals against unheralded young defender Zac Dawson. The decision by Hawks coach Alastair Clarkson to play Dawson on the much stronger and athletic Rocca was heavily criticised in the media. Rocca spoke out on this and was quoted as saying "he has to learn". He kicked a career-best season return of 55 goals and was the club's leading goalkicker for the third time. His first half of the season was fantastic, while he struggled in the second half. He made the news in the Round 16 clash against the West Coast Eagles, where he had shown the ball to umpire Hayden Kennedy while walking off his mark, after Rocca turned over a free kick, after a mistake by Kennedy minutes before. In round 22, Anthony played against his brother, Saverio, for Sav's farewell game before heading to the United States to become a gridiron punter.

Rocca's 2008 season was highlighted by mixed form and inconsistency.

He spent much of the first half of 2009 in the reserves, having been dropped from the senior side due to poor form and injury. With the continued rise of Travis Cloke and Jack Anthony, there was media speculation as to whether Rocca was needed in the senior side, and some speculated that at his age he may never return. However, Rocca answered his critics with some impressive form in the reserves, earning a return in round 4 against the Brisbane Lions, in which he had a solid match-up forward.

== Retirement ==
Rocca announced his retirement on 21 September 2009. He finished his AFL career with 242 games and 415 goals.

At the end of 2010, Rocca was promoted to Collingwood's defensive development coach, working under Craig McRae. In early January 2011, Rocca took up the job of assistant coach of the Magpies' VFL team alongside its new coach Tarkyn Lockyer.

Rocca became North Melbourne's development coach on 20 January 2021.

== Personal life ==
Of Italian descent, Rocca is the younger brother of former Australian rules footballer and NFL punter Saverio Rocca.

Rocca is married to Enza Colosimo and has a daughter, Mia, and a son, Max.
