= Tim Scott (footballer) =

Australian rules footballer

Personal information
- Full name: Tim Scott
- Born: 12 December 1971 (age 54)
- Original team: Albury
- Height: 174 cm (5 ft 9 in)
- Weight: 75 kg (165 lb)

Playing career^{1}
Years	Club	Games (Goals)
1995	Sydney Swans	1 (0)
- ^{1} Playing statistics correct to the end of 1995.

Tim Scott (born 12 December 1971) is a former Australian rules footballer who played with the Sydney Swans in the Australian Football League (AFL).

Scott was a mature age recruit for Sydney, drafted after two standout seasons for Albury in the Ovens & Murray Football League, where he won back to back Morris Medals in 1993 and 1994. The second of those awards was shared, with John Kingston of Corowa-Rutherglen, but he became the first Albury player to win it twice.

He came to the Swans as one of three zone selections from the 1994 AFL draft, along with Leo Barry and Justin Crawford. A rover, he made his only senior appearance when he played in the Sydney's win over Fitzroy at the Sydney Cricket Ground, in round four of the 1995 AFL season.

When he returned to Albury he continued to give the club good service. He was voted "Best on Ground" in their 1997 premiership win and took home his third club "Best and Fairest" in 2001.
