= Shawn Lewfatt =

Australian rules footballer

Personal information
- Born: 11 March 1977 (age 49)
- Original team: Darwin / Western Jets
- Debut: 1 April 1995, Essendon vs. Fitzroy, at Western Oval
- Height: 174 cm (5 ft 9 in)
- Weight: 75 kg (165 lb)

Playing career^{1}
Years	Club	Games (Goals)
1995	Essendon	3 (2)
- ^{1} Playing statistics correct to the end of 1995.

Shawn Lewfatt (born 11 March 1977) is a former Australian rules footballer who played for Essendon in the Australian Football League (AFL).

He was drafted by the Essendon Football Club in the 1994 National draft at pick 28. He played three games with Essendon during the 1995 season.
