= Matthew Manfield =

Australian rules footballer (born 1977)

Personal information
- Full name: Matthew Manfield
- Born: 14 April 1977 (age 49)
- Original team: Woodville-West Torrens
- Draft: 24th, 1994 National Draft
- Height: 192 cm (6 ft 4 in)
- Weight: 88 kg (194 lb)

Playing career^{1}
Years	Club	Games (Goals)
1995–1996	Fitzroy	5 (0)
1997–1998	Richmond	6 (2)
1999	Collingwood	0 (0)
Total		11 (2)
- ^{1} Playing statistics correct to the end of 1999.

Matthew Manfield (born 14 April 1977) is a former Australian rules footballer who played with Fitzroy and Richmond in the Australian Football League (AFL).

Recruited to the AFL from the Woodville-West Torrens Football Club, Manfield was selected by Fitzroy with the 24th pick of the 1994 National Draft. He made his debut in the opening round of the 1995 AFL season, against Essendon at Western Oval, but did not feature again that year.

After playing four games in 1996, Manfield entered into the draft again and was signed up by Richmond. He played two games for Richmond in 1997 and another four in 1998.

In 1999 he joined Collingwood but would not play a senior AFL games for the club.

He later played at Glenelg and while with the club in 2003 was diagnosed with testicular cancer. He successfully went through surgery and radiotherapy and he is now the father of twins.
