= Richard Blurton =

British archaeologist

T. Richard Blurton (born 1952) is a specialist in South Asian art and archaeology, formerly Assistant Keeper at the British Museum.

== About ==
Blurton has an MPhil in archaeology from Cambridge, and worked on excavations and research projects in Afghanistan and southern India, before joining the British Museum in 1986. A curator in the Dept of Oriental Antiquities (subsequently, the Dept of Asia), he was responsible for the collections from south India, Southeast Asia, and Tibet. He retired in 2018.

== Awards and honours ==
2012 Awarded the Brayton Wilbur Jr. Memorial Fellowship in Asian Art

== Selected publications ==
- 1990 – Continuity and change in the tradition of Bengali pata-painting
- 1991 – The Cultural Heritage of the Indian Village (with Brian Durrans)
- 1992 – Hindu Art
- 1997 – The Enduring Image: Treasures from the British Museum (ed.)
- 2000 – Visions from the Golden Land: Burma and the Art of Lacquer (co-authored with Ralph Isaacs)
- 2002 – Burma: Art and Archaeology (co-edited with Alexandra Green)
- 2003 – "On the Borders of Tibet", British Museum Magazine, no. 45 (summer 2003)
- 2006 – Bengali Myths (Czech edn, 2007; Spanish edn, 2008)
- 2016 – Krishna in the garden of Assam the history and context of a much-travelled textile
