= Martin Heppell =

Australian rules footballer

Personal information
- Full name: Martin Heppell
- Nickname: RAC (pronounced "rack")
- Born: 14 November 1974 (age 51)
- Original team: Carey Grammar
- Height: 178 cm (5 ft 10 in)
- Weight: 75 kg (165 lb)

Playing career^{1}
Years	Club	Games (Goals)
1993–1994	St Kilda	5 (0)
1995	Melbourne	2 (0)
1996-1998	Norwood	10 (4)
Total		17 (4)
- ^{1} Playing statistics correct to the end of 1995.

Martin Heppell (born 14 November 1974) is a former Australian rules footballer who played with St Kilda and Melbourne in the Australian Football League (AFL).

Recruited from Carey Grammar, Heppell played five senior games for St Kilda over two seasons, then went to Melbourne, at pick 28 in the 1995 Pre-Season Draft. He was also unable to gain regular senior selection at Melbourne, playing only two AFL games.

Heppell was a member of Norwood's 1998 SANFL reserves premiership team, where he played with his brother Malcolm Heppell.

He later coached the Box Hill reserves and Mitcham in the Eastern Football League.

Martin is now a partner/facilitator for The Resilience Project.
