= Western Jets =

Names
- Full name: Western Jets Football Club
- Nickname(s): Jets, Jettas

2026 season
- After finals: 9th
- Home-and-away season: 2nd

Club details
- Founded: 1992; 34 years ago
- Colours: Blue Yellow
- Competition: Talent League
- Coach: Trent Dennis Lane
- Captain: Lucca greggo (2023)
- Premierships: Talent League (0)
- Ground: Burbank Oval, Williamstown

Other information
- Official website: WJFC

The Western Jets is an Australian rules football club which plays in the Victorian premier U19 competition, the Talent League, since its inception in 1992. The club have developmental squads in the U16, however much of the attention is towards its U18 team.

The club is geographically set in Melbourne's West as part of a decision by AFL Victoria (formerly Football Victoria) to have clubs in all regions of the state.

The club trains in Melbourne's inner west at Crofts Reserve in Altona North and plays NAB League matches at Burbank Oval in Williamstown.

== Sponsors ==
The club is sponsored by TAC, Victoria University, Australia, Meat2U, Werribee Mazda, Master Dry Cleaners, Divella, Burbank Homes and KFC.

== Statistics ==
- Premierships: Nil
- Runners Up (2): 1992, 1993
- Minor Premiers (1): 1993
- Wooden Spoons (4): 1997, 1998, 2002, 2025

Games Record Holder: Darcy Weeks(76 games been there for 5 years)

Goals Record Holder: Lachlan Fitzgerald (59 goals)

TAC CUP Coach Award Winners: Paul Carson (2000), Bradley Miller (2001)

=== Talent League Girls ===
- Premierships (1): 2022
- Runners-up (0): Nil

== Draftees ==
- 1992: Dustin Fletcher, Paul Satterley, Mark Ballan, Brad Copeland, Craig Ellis, Brendan Duncan
- 1993: Brad Johnson, Robert Stevenson, Darryl Griffin, Aaron James, David Innella, Cain Liddle
- 1994: Matthew Lloyd, Shannon Grant, Robert Di Rosa, Shawn Lewfatt, Allen Nash, Matthew Belleville, Stephen Zavalas, Lee Fraser, Dean Helmers, Todd McHardy, David Nicholson
- 1995: -
- 1996: -
- 1997: Lance Picioane, Chris Obst, David Antonowicz, Anthony Aloi,
- 1998: Heath Scotland, Matthew Pearce
- 1999: Daniel Giansiracusa, Ty Zantuck, Ben Haynes, James Podsiadly
- 2000: Paul Chambers
- 2001: Brad D. Miller
- 2002: Callum Urch, Dale Carson
- 2003: Michael Rischitelli, Murray Boyd
- 2004: Brent Prismall, Ben Davies
- 2005: Jake Edwards
- 2006: Bachar Houli
- 2007: Callan Ward, Will Sullivan
- 2008: Jayden Post, Mitch Banner, Bryce Carroll
- 2009: Jack Fitzpatrick, Majak Daw
- 2011: Will Hoskin-Elliott, Elliott Kavanagh
- 2012: Spencer White, Lachie Hunter
- 2013: James Sicily
- 2014: Liam Duggan, Corey Ellis, Jayden Laverde, Dillon Viojo-Rainbow, Connor Menadue, Brenton Payne
- 2015: Luke Goetz
- 2016: Daniel Venables, Oscar Junker
- 2017: Cameron Rayner, Lachie Fogarty, Tristan Xerri
- 2018: Zak Butters, Xavier O'Halloran
- 2019: Josh Honey, Emerson Jeka
- 2020: Eddie Ford
- 2021: Paul Curtis, Cody Raak
- 2022: Massimo D'Ambrosio
- 2023: Logan Morris
- 2024: Lucca Greggo, Keighton Matofai-Forbes
- 2025: Finnegan Davis

== Team of the Year ==
- 1992: Brad Copeland, Dustin Fletcher, Matthew Moylan
- 1993: Brad Johnson, David Weston, Mark Cheel
- 1994: Shannon Grant, Matthew Lloyd, Robert Di Rosa
- 1996: Dion Miles
- 1997: Lance Picioane
- 1998: Heath Scotland
- 1999: Ben Haynes
- 2000: Paul Chambers
- 2001: Brad D. Miller
- 2003: Cameron Gauci, Murray Boyd
- 2004: Brent Prismall
- 2006: Cameron Lockwood
- 2007: Callan Ward, Mitch Banner
- 2008: Mitch Banner
- 2009: Sean Tighe, Johnny Rayner
- 2010: Adam Kennedy
- 2011: Will Hoskin-Elliott, Adam Kennedy
- 2012: Lachie Hunter
  - Source:1992-2010 "TAC Cup Team of the Year players".

== Grand Finals ==
| Season | Premiers | GF Score | Runner-up | Best-on-ground |
|---|---|---|---|---|
| 1992 | Geelong Falcons | 18.16 (124) - 12.10 (82) | Western Jets | Daniel Fletcher |
| 1993 | Northern Knights | 32.10 (202) - 18.11 (119) | Western Jets | Shannon Gibson |
