= Norm Charles =

Australian rules footballer

Personal information
- Full name: Norm Charles
- Born: 1 August 1931
- Died: 25 November 2017 (aged 86)
- Original team: Yarraville Socials
- Height: 185 cm (6 ft 1 in)
- Weight: 83 kg (183 lb)

Playing career^{1}
| Years | Club | Games (Goals) |
| 1950–51 | Footscray | 5 (8) |
- ^{1} Playing statistics correct to the end of 1951.

Norm Charles (1 August 1931 – 25 November 2017) was a former Australian rules footballer who played with Footscray in the Victorian Football League (VFL).
