= Chris Hemley =

Australian rules footballer

Personal information
- Full name: Chris Hemley
- Born: 8 September 1977 (age 49)
- Original teams: Geelong Falcons, (TAC Cup)
- Draft: St Kilda: No. 13, 1994 AFL draft Geelong: No. 28, 1998 Rookie Draft

Playing career^{1}
Years	Club	Games (Goals)
1995	St Kilda	1 (0)
- ^{1} Playing statistics correct to the end of 1995.

Chris Hemley (born 8 September 1977) is a former Australian rules footballer who played for St Kilda in the Australian Football League (AFL) in 1995. He was recruited from the Geelong Falcons in the TAC Cup with the 13th selection in the 1994 AFL draft. This draft selection was part of the compensation received by St Kilda for trading Tony Lockett to Sydney. After playing just one game for St Kilda in 1995, he was delisted, but was later recruited by Geelong with the 28th selection in the 1998 Rookie Draft. However, he never played another senior AFL game.

Hemley was one of the four St Kilda players featured at the start of the 1995 music video Greg! The Stop Sign!! by Australian band TISM.

Hemley would play for the Glenorchy Football Club in the Tasmanian Football League in 1999.
