= Chris Curran (Australian footballer) =

Australian rules footballer (1974–2018)

Personal information
- Born: 3 August 1974
- Died: 8 October 2018 (aged 44)
- Original team: Boronia (EFL)/ Box Hill (VFL)
- Height: 178 cm (5 ft 10 in)
- Weight: 76 kg (168 lb)

Playing career^{1}
Years	Club	Games (Goals)
1995–1998	Collingwood	34 (14)
- ^{1} Playing statistics correct to the end of 1998.

Career highlights
- Joseph Wren Memorial Trophy 1994

Chris Curran (3 August 1974 – 8 October 2018) was an Australian rules footballer who played with Collingwood in the Australian Football League (AFL).

Curran, a midfielder who could also play as a tagger, played for Boronia Football Club in the Eastern Football League and Box Hill in the Victorian Football League before moving to AFL club Richmond. After failing to impress the Richmond coaching staff, Curran was recruited by Collingwood and won the Joseph Wren Memorial Trophy for the Best and Fairest player in the Collingwood reserves in 1994.

Elevated to Collingwood's senior list in the 1994 AFL draft as a pre-draft supplementary selection, Curran made his senior AFL debut in 1995, playing ten games for the season and a further nine in 1996. After 12 matches in 1997, the injury prone Curran retired after playing a further three games in 1998.

== Post-football ==
Curran worked for many years as physical education teacher at St Margaret's School, Melbourne. He died in 2018 at the age of 44.
