= Clinton Wolf =

Personal information
- Born: 18 December 1968 (age 57)
- Original team: Claremont (WAFL)
- Draft: Zone Selection, 1994 AFL draft
- Height: 195 cm (6 ft 5 in)
- Weight: 99 kg (218 lb)
- Position: Ruckman

Playing career^{1}
Years	Club	Games (Goals)
1988-1990	East Fremantle	20 (6)
1991, 1993–1995	Claremont	52 (11)
1995	Fremantle	4 (0)
Total		76 (17)
- ^{1} Playing statistics correct to the end of 1995.

Clinton Wolf (born 18 December 1968) is an Australian Aboriginal leader and former Australian rules footballer.

== Football career ==
Wolf began his career with East Fremantle in 1988 before moving to the Claremont Football Club in the West Australian Football League in 1991, playing in their premiership side. He missed the 1992 season due to work in Kalgoorlie, but despite a major knee reconstruction early in the season recovered to play in the 1993 Tiger premiership team. Continued solid form in 1994 saw Wolf make the inaugural squad of the Fremantle Football Club in the Australian Football League. Wolf only played four matches for Fremantle in the 1995 AFL season before retiring due to recurring knee injuries.

== Working life ==
As a lawyer, Wolf was the executive director of the Yamatji Land and Sea Council native title representative body from 1998 to 2001. He is currently Chief Executive Officer of the Western Desert Land Aboriginal Corporation.

He is, as of 2011, chairperson of the Western Australian Aboriginal Lands Trust.
