= Mark Kennedy (Australian footballer) =

Australian rules footballer

Personal information
- Full name: Mark Kennedy
- Born: 24 May 1972 (age 54)
- Original team: Woodville-West Torrens
- Draft: No. 19, 1995 Pre-Season Draft
- Height: 185 cm (6 ft 1 in)
- Weight: 87 kg (192 lb)

Playing career^{1}
Years	Club	Games (Goals)
1995	St Kilda	8 (0)
- ^{1} Playing statistics correct to the end of 1995.

Mark Kennedy (born 24 May 1972) is a former Australian rules footballer who played with St Kilda in the Australian Football League (AFL).

Kennedy was selected by St Kilda with pick 19 in the 1995 Pre-Season Draft, from Woodville-West Torrens. A defender, he played eight league games for St Kilda, all in the 1995 AFL season.
