= Andrew Nichol =

Australian rules footballer

Personal information
- Full name: Andrew Nichol
- Born: 1 December 1974 (age 51)
- Original teams: Box Hill, (VFL)
- Draft: No. 37, 1995 Pre-season Draft

Playing career^{1}
Years	Club	Games (Goals)
1995	Footscray	3 (0)
- ^{1} Playing statistics correct to the end of 1995.

Andrew Nichol (born 1 December 1974) is a former Australian rules footballer who played for Footscray in the Australian Football League (AFL) in 1995. He was recruited from the Box Hill Football Club in the Victorian Football League (VFL) with the 37th selection in the 1995 pre-season draft.

After retiring as a player, Nichol was a junior and assistant coach, joining the Melbourne coaching group in 2011.
