= Mark Orchard (footballer) =

Australian rules footballer

Personal information
- Full name: Mark Orchard
- Born: 2 April 1976 (age 50)
- Original team: Ballarat U-18s
- Draft: 53rd, 1994 AFL draft
- Height: 175 cm (5 ft 9 in)
- Weight: 75 kg (165 lb)

Playing career^{1}
Years	Club	Games (Goals)
1995–1996	Collingwood	12 (4)
1997–1998	Sydney	41 (5)
1999–2000	Collingwood	33 (6)
Total		86 (15)
- ^{1} Playing statistics correct to the end of 2000.

Mark Orchard (born 2 April 1976) is a former Australian rules footballer who played with Collingwood and the Sydney Swans in the Australian Football League (AFL). He is of Irish descent.

Orchard started his career playing for Ballarat local Catholic junior club YCWCYC and St. Patricks College in Ballarat, then East Ballarat and was playing for the town's Under-18s when Collingwood selected him in the 1994 AFL draft. He made six appearances in each of his first two seasons and was then given up by Collingwood in order to secure Sydney's Anthony Rocca. Orchard, Ben Wilson and two draft picks ended up at Sydney.

Despite his new club coming off a successful 1996 campaign where they were grand finalists, Orchard managed to find a place for himself in their midfielder and played in the first 19 rounds in the 1997 AFL season as well as a qualifying final against the Western Bulldogs. He participated in finals again at the end of the 1998 season, where he added another 21 games.

After two years with Sydney, Orchard requested to be traded back to Collingwood. He was part of a trade in the 1998 AFL draft which saw Sydney also lose Paul Licuria and a draft pick in exchange for the third pick of the draft, Nic Fosdike.

He averaged 15 disposals a game in 1999 and missed several games mid season with a torn hamstring. The following year he put together 18 appearances but was de-listed by Collingwood.

As a schoolboy Orchard was a champion runner. He held a number of Australian primary schools athletic records in the 100m, 200m and still holds a long jump record.

After his football career ended he returned to Ballarat and works with horses.
