= James McLure (footballer) =

Australian rules footballer

Personal information
- Full name: James McLure
- Born: 18 September 1974 (age 52)
- Original teams: Geelong Falcons (TAC Cup); Geelong Amateurs, (Bellarine FL)
- Draft: No. 11, 1992 Mid Year Draft
- Height: 175 cm (5 ft 9 in)
- Weight: 73 kg (161 lb)

Playing career^{1}
Years	Club	Games (Goals)
1995	Geelong	3 (0)
- ^{1} Playing statistics correct to the end of 1995.

James McLure (born 18 September 1974) is a former Australian rules footballer who played in three games for Geelong in the Australian Football League (AFL) in 1995.

He was initially drafted to Collingwood in the AFL in the 1992 Mid Year Draft. He was delisted by Collingwood at the end of the 1993 season without having played a senior game. He was then recruited to Geelong with a pre-draft supplementary selection in the 1994 AFL draft. He played in three games for Geelong in 1995, but was delisted at the end of the season. He then moved to South Australia where he played over 100 games for Woodville-West Torrens.

He has completed a PhD in clinical pharmacology. In 2010 he published a book, Eight Stones: My Journey Through Schizophrenia and Depression, outlining his life coping with schizophrenia and depression.

== Bibliography ==
- McLure, James (2010). Eight Stones: My Journey Through Schizophrenia and Depression. ISBN 9780646544588.
