= Brett Chandler =

Australian rules footballer

Personal information
- Full name: Brett Chandler
- Born: 11 July 1975 (age 51)
- Original team: Fitzroy Reserves
- Draft: Pre-Draft Selection, 1994 AFL draft
- Height: 173 cm (5 ft 8 in)
- Weight: 73 kg (161 lb)

Playing career^{1}
Years	Club	Games (Goals)
1995–1996	Fitzroy	28 (2)
1997–2000	North Melbourne	44 (6)
Total		72 (8)
- ^{1} Playing statistics correct to the end of 2000.

Brett Chandler (born 11 July 1975) is a former Australian rules footballer who played with Fitzroy and North Melbourne in the Australian Football League (AFL).

Chandler made his way into the Fitzroy team from the reserves, after originally coming to the club from the Eastern Ranges. He played his first AFL season in 1995 and in 1996 averaged 16 disposals.

When the Brisbane Lions were formed, Chandler wasn't amongst the Fitzroy players that headed to Queensland, instead joining reigning premiers North Melbourne. He made his way into the seniors immediately and played the first 14 games of the 1997 AFL season, missed round 15 then played every game for the rest of the year including three finals. Chandler was not able to participate in the Kangaroos 1999 premiership-winning season, as he spent all year on the sidelines with a broken leg. He returned in 2000 but could only manage four games, the last of which was a 125-point loss to Essendon in a qualifying final.

He is now the coaching director of the Beverly Hils Junior Football Club.
