= Anthony Mellington =

Australian rules footballer (born 1974)

Personal information
- Full name: Anthony Mellington
- Born: 27 July 1974 (age 52)
- Original team: Shepparton
- Draft: 18th, 1995 Pre-Season draft
- Height: 187 cm (6 ft 2 in)
- Weight: 84 kg (185 lb)
- Position: Forward

Playing career^{1}
Years	Club	Games (Goals)
1995–1996	Fitzroy	24 (24)
1997–1999	North Melbourne	20 (19)
Total		44 (43)
- ^{1} Playing statistics correct to the end of 1999.

Anthony Mellington (born 27 July 1974) is an Australian rules footballer who played with Fitzroy and North Melbourne in the Australian Football League (AFL).

After being picked up in the 1995 Pre-Season draft, Mellington made six AFL appearances in his first year at Fitzroy. He was a regular fixture up forward for Fitzroy in 1996, their last season in the AFL. His best performance came in round eight, when he kicked six goals in a win over Fremantle. Despite finishing the season with a modest 22 goals (and 26 behinds), it was not bettered by any other teammates, giving Mellington the honour of winning Fitzroy's final leading goal-kicker award in the AFL.

In search of a new club for the 1997 AFL season, reigning premiers North Melbourne selected him in the Pre-season Draft. He had 16 disposals and five goals against Richmond in just his second game for North Melbourne, and he backed up with three and four goal hauls in the following two rounds. By the time finals arrived, he had lost his place in the side and appeared just six more times for the club, five in 1998 and the other in their premiership winning 1999 season.

Mellington was then delisted and returned to his original team, Shepparton. He had a prolific year as a forward for Shepparton in 2000, with 119 goals in the home and away season, to finish top on the Goulburn Valley Football League's goal-kicking lists. After leaving Shepparton he spent some time at Montmorency in the Diamond Valley Football League. He then played for Murray Football League club Tocumwal and helped them win the 2009 premiership. The following year he joined Heathcote and was a member of their 2010 premiership side, playing as a defender.
