= Peter Miller (Australian footballer) =

Australian rules footballer (born 1969)

Personal information
- Born: 6 April 1969 (age 57)
- Original team: East Perth (WAFL)
- Debut: Round 2, 1995, Fremantle vs. Essendon, at the WACA

Playing career^{1}
Years	Club	Games (Goals)
1995	Fremantle	16 (15)
- ^{1} Playing statistics correct to the end of 1995.

Peter Miller (born 6 April 1969) is an Australian rules footballer who played for the Fremantle Dockers in 1995. He was a predraft selection from East Perth in the WAFL in the 1994 AFL draft and played mainly as a rover.

Along with Peter F. Bell, Miller was Fremantle's first signing in late 1994. A small rover, he managed 16 games in 1995 but surprisingly retired from the AFL at the end of the season. After a short break from football, he returned to East Perth and was later appointed captain. He played a total of 176 games for East Perth between 1988 and 1998, winning the FD Book Medal in 1992 and 1998, but retired having played in only one grand final, which was a narrow loss to Claremont in 1996.
