= Glen Coghlan =

Australian rules footballer

Personal information
- Full name: Glen Coghlan
- Born: 29 July 1974 (age 52)
- Original team: Waaia / Kyabram
- Draft: No. 5, 1995 Pre-Season Draft
- Height: 190 cm (6 ft 3 in)
- Weight: 94 kg (207 lb)

Playing career^{1}
Years	Club	Games (Goals)
1995–1997	St Kilda	29 (7)
- ^{1} Playing statistics correct to the end of 1997.

Glen Coghlan (born 29 July 1974) is a former Australian rules footballer who played with St Kilda in the Australian Football League (AFL).

Coghlan was on the supplementary list at Collingwood and played for both Waaia (Nathalia Football Club) and Kyabram, before arriving at St Kilda, via the 1995 Pre-Season Draft. He played initially as a centre half-forward, but was then used as a defender. Over the course of three seasons, Coghlan amassed 29 league games.
