= Damien Ryan (footballer) =

Australian rules footballer (born 1977)

Personal information
- Full name: Damien John Ryan
- Born: 3 August 1977 (age 49)
- Original team: Eastern Ranges
- Draft: 11th, 1994 National Draft
- Height: 188 cm (6 ft 2 in)
- Weight: 85 kg (187 lb)

Playing career^{1}
Years	Club	Games (Goals)
1996–1998	Richmond	30 (6)
1999–2001	St Kilda	30 (3)
Total		60 (9)
- ^{1} Playing statistics correct to the end of 2001.

Damien John Ryan (born 3 August 1977) is a former Australian rules footballer who played with Richmond and St Kilda in the Australian Football League (AFL).

Ryan was a defender, selected with Richmond's first pick and 11th overall in the 1994 National Draft. He spent three years playing senior football at Richmond before again nominating for the draft and being selected by St Kilda at pick 43. In his first season with St Kilda he made 20 appearances, double his previous season's best, but he added just five more games in each of his next two seasons.
