= Matthew Jackson (footballer) =

Australian rules footballer

Personal information
- Full name: Matthew Jackson
- Born: 15 August 1974 (age 52)
- Original team: Central Dragons
- Draft: No. 46, 1992 National Draft
- Height: 177 cm (5 ft 10 in)
- Weight: 74 kg (163 lb)

Playing career^{1}
Years	Club	Games (Goals)
1995	St Kilda	4 (2)
- ^{1} Playing statistics correct to the end of 1995.

Matthew Jackson (born 15 August 1974) is a former Australian rules footballer who played with St Kilda in the Australian Football League (AFL).

Jackson, a rover from the Central Dragons, was selected by St Kilda with pick 46 in the 1992 National Draft. He played four games for St Kilda, all in the 1995 AFL season.
