= Neil Mildenhall =

Australian rules footballer

Personal information
- Born: 8 September 1968 (age 58)
- Original team: West Perth (WAFL)
- Debut: Round 5, 1995, Fremantle vs. Western Bulldogs, at Western Oval

Playing career^{1}
| Years | Club | Games (Goals) |
| 1995 | Fremantle | 7 (2) |
- ^{1} Playing statistics correct to the end of 1995.

Neil Mildenhall (born 8 September 1968) is an Australian rules footballer who played for the Fremantle Dockers in 1995. He was drafted from West Perth in the WAFL as a predraft selection in the 1994 AFL draft and played mainly as a wingman.

Originally from Victoria, Mildenhall moved to WA in 1993 to play for West Perth and was an immediate success, winning the Sandover Medal in that year. A tall wingman, he had limited success in the AFL with Fremantle, but remained a regular player for West Perth, playing 100 games for the Falcons and being a member of their 1995 premiership side.

Since retiring from playing, Mildenhall has continued to be involved as a coach of the West Perth colts and was an assistant coach for the state under 18s squad in 2006.
