= Simon Arnott =

Australian rules footballer

Personal information
- Born: 14 February 1976 (age 50)
- Original team: Wesley College, Melbourne
- Debut: Round 10, 1995, Sydney vs. Melbourne, at the MCG
- Height: 186 cm (6 ft 1 in)
- Weight: 82 kg (181 lb)

Playing career^{1}
| Years | Club | Games (Goals) |
| 1995–1998 | Sydney Swans | 30 (15) |
| 1999–2000 | Geelong | 26 (20) |
| Total | | 56 (35) |
- ^{1} Playing statistics correct to the end of 2000.

Simon Arnott (born 14 February 1976) is a former Australian rules footballer who played with the Sydney Swans and Geelong in the Australian Football League (AFL).

Arnott was a midfielder who was drafted from Collegians FC in the VAFA and made his league debut in 1995 with Sydney. He struggled however to get game time in what became a strong Sydney side and after spending most of the 1998 season with the reserves, where he won the Gardiner Medal, Arnott decided to cross to Geelong. In 1999, his first season with Geelong, he managed to play every game of the home and away season but a drop in form in 2000 saw him delisted. He joined Central District in the SANFL where he became a premiership player.

He was educated at Wesley College, Melbourne, where he is currently employed as the College Sports Operations Manager.
