= Tony Sullivan =

Australian rules footballer

Personal information
- Born: 18 January 1949 (age 77)
- Original team: St Pat's (Ballarat)
- Height: 180 cm (5 ft 11 in)
- Weight: 82 kg (181 lb)

Playing career^{1}
Years	Club	Games (Goals)
1967–1979	Melbourne	191 (1)
- ^{1} Playing statistics correct to the end of 1979.

Anthony 'Tony' Sullivan (born 18 January 1949) is a former Australian rules footballer who played for Melbourne in the VFL during the 1970s.

Sullivan played as a defender and was an important member of the Melbourne team in what was an unsuccessful era for the club. He made his debut in 1967 but never really established himself in the side until the 1970s. The 1979 season was his last in the VFL.

== Statistics ==
Legend
G	Goals	K	Kicks	D	Disposals	T	Tackles
B	Behinds	H	Handballs	M	Marks

Season	Team	No.	Games	Totals							Averages (per game)						
Season	Team	No.	Games	G	B	K	H	D	M	T	G	B	K	H	D	M	T
1967	Melbourne	43	2	0	0	1	0	1	0	—N/a	0.0	0.0	1.0	0.0	1.0	0.0	—N/a
1968	Melbourne	4	6	0	0	64	4	68	8	—N/a	0.0	0.0	10.7	0.7	11.3	1.3	—N/a
1969	Melbourne	4	17	0	0	177	12	189	51	—N/a	0.0	0.0	10.4	0.7	11.1	3.0	—N/a
1970	Melbourne	4	22	1	1	317	17	334	86	—N/a	0.0	0.0	14.4	0.8	15.2	3.9	—N/a
1971	Melbourne	4	21	0	0	277	24	301	84	—N/a	0.0	0.0	13.2	1.1	14.3	4.0	—N/a
1972	Melbourne	4	18	0	0	230	22	252	61	—N/a	0.0	0.0	12.8	1.2	14.0	3.4	—N/a
1973	Melbourne	4	21	0	2	262	47	309	81	—N/a	0.0	0.1	12.5	2.2	14.7	3.9	—N/a
1974	Melbourne	4	18	0	0	266	74	340	57	—N/a	0.0	0.0	14.8	4.1	18.9	3.2	—N/a
1975	Melbourne	4	15	0	0	183	24	207	47	—N/a	0.0	0.0	12.2	1.6	13.8	3.1	—N/a
1976	Melbourne	4	15	0	0	202	20	222	48	—N/a	0.0	0.0	13.5	1.3	14.8	3.2	—N/a
1977	Melbourne	4	18	0	1	228	41	269	50	—N/a	0.0	0.1	12.7	2.3	14.9	2.8	—N/a
1978	Melbourne	4	11	0	0	103	39	142	25	—N/a	0.0	0.0	9.4	3.5	12.9	2.3	—N/a
1979	Melbourne	4	7	0	0	89	29	118	18	—N/a	0.0	0.0	12.7	4.1	16.9	2.6	—N/a
Career			191	1	4	2399	353	2752	616	—N/a	0.0	0.0	12.6	1.8	14.4	3.2	—N/a
