= Jay Burton =

Australian rules footballer, born 1972

Personal information
- Born: 25 October 1972 (age 54); Perth, Western Australia
- Original team: Subiaco (WAFL)
- Debut: Round 16, 12 July 1995, Fremantle. vs. Richmond., at Subiaco Oval

Playing career^{1}
Years	Club	Games (Goals)
1994–1997	Subiaco	27 (8)
1995–1996	Fremantle	2 (0)
- ^{1} Playing statistics correct to the end of 1996.

Jay Burton (born 25 October 1972) is an Australian rules footballer. He played as a ruckman and began his football career at Subiaco.

== Football career ==
Burton was drafted by Richmond with the 77th selection in the 1991 Australian Football League (AFL) draft. He didn't play a senior AFL game, playing instead for Richmond reserves and Oakleigh Football Club in the Victorian Football Association (VFA). He returned to Subiaco to play in the West Australian Football League (WAFL) in 1994. At the end of the year he was recruited to be an inaugural squad member of the Fremantle, along with his older brother, Matthew. He only played two games for Fremantle, both of which were when his brother was out of the team. He performed well for Subiaco, however, being selected to represent Western Australia in the interstate match against Queensland, and finishing equal ninth in the 1995 Sandover Medal.

After suffering repeated dislocated knee injuries, he was delisted by Fremantle at the end of the 1995 season. However, after surgery, he was re-drafted in the 1995 national draft. He wouldn't fully recover, and wouldn't play a senior game for neither Fremantle nor Subiaco in 1996. He was again delisted by Fremantle at the end of the 1996 season. Recovering for the 1997 season, he was named captain of Subiaco, but a broken jaw and further knee injuries would restrict him to playing only four games for Subiaco in 1997.

His father, Peter, also played for and captained Subiaco, including being a member of their 1973 WANFL Premiership winning team. He was the Subiaco coach in 1979 and part of 1980. A younger brother, Travis, also played for Subiaco and was drafted by West Coast in the 1992 AFL draft, but did not play an AFL game.
