= Justin Crawford (Australian footballer) =

Australian rules footballer (1977–2022)

Personal information
- Born: 20 March 1977; Finley, New South Wales, Australia
- Died: 21 July 2022 (aged 45)
- Original team: Tocumwal/Assumption College
- Draft: Zone selection, 1994 AFL draft
- Height: 181 cm (5 ft 11 in)
- Weight: 82 kg (181 lb)

Playing career^{1}
Years	Club	Games (Goals)
1995–1996	Sydney	17 (11)
1997–1998	Hawthorn	29 (21)
Total		46 (32)
- ^{1} Playing statistics correct to the end of 1998.

Career highlights
- AFL Rising Star nominee: 1995

Justin Crawford (20 March 1977 – 21 July 2022) was an Australian rules footballer who played with Sydney and Hawthorn in the Australian Football League (AFL) during the 1990s.

Crawford, the younger brother of Brownlow Medal winner Shane Crawford, was recruited from Tocumwal in the Murray Football League by Sydney as a zone selection. He was just 18 when he made his debut in 1995 and earned an AFL Rising Star nomination for a 26-disposal and two-goal game against Fitzroy. An on-baller, Crawford took part in Sydney's qualifying final win over Hawthorn in 1996 but had just seven disposals and was dropped for the preliminary final to make way for Tony Lockett's return.

He joined his brother at Hawthorn in 1997 after being traded for David McEwan and the 17th selection of the 1996 AFL draft, which was used on Rowan Warfe. Playing mostly as a forward, Crawford played 15 games in 1997 and was fined $1,000 over an incident at Crown Casino, in which he urinated under a gambling table. He retired from the AFL at the end of the 1998 season, aged just 21.

He resurfaced in the West Australian Football League (WAFL) to play with South Fremantle and was part of the club's premiership in 2005 but left the club at the end of that year.

== Death ==
Crawford died on 21 July 2022; no detail was initially provided on the cause of death, though it was later revealed to be death from suicide. He was 45.
