= Danny Morgan (Australian footballer) =

Australian rules footballer

Personal information
- Full name: Danny Morgan
- Born: 20 August 1974 (age 52)
- Original team: Boolarra / Preston Knights
- Draft: 87th, 1990 National Draft
- Height: 178 cm (5 ft 10 in)
- Weight: 84 kg (185 lb)

Playing career^{1}
Years	Club	Games (Goals)
1991–1992	Carlton	0 (0)
1993–1997	Essendon	16 (2)
- ^{1} Playing statistics correct to the end of 1997.

Danny Morgan (born 20 August 1974) is a former Australian rules footballer who played with Essendon in the Australian Football League (AFL).

Morgan came to Carlton in the 1990 National Draft but would only play for them at reserves level. While playing with the Preston Knights, he was picked up by Essendon with the 23rd selection of the 1993 Mid-Season Draft. An on-baller, he won the Essendon reserves best and fairest award in 1994, an award he would also win in 1996. In just his second senior game, against Adelaide in the 1995 AFL season, Morgan had 24 disposals and earned two Brownlow Medal votes.

In 1998 he moved to Port Adelaide in the SANFL and played in both their 1998 and 1999 Premiership team.

He is the great-grandson of Fitzroy premiership captain Gerald Brosnan.

Morgan has worked for ABC News since 2004. He spent three years as a reporter in the ABC's Parliament House Bureau (2008-2011) covering the 2010 federal election and the overthrow of Kevin Rudd.
