= Andrew Cavedon =

Australian rules footballer

Personal information
- Full name: Andrew Cavedon
- Born: 5 November 1971 (age 54)
- Original team: Lalor / Princes Hill
- Height: 196 cm (6 ft 5 in)
- Weight: 88 kg (194 lb)
- Position: Forward / ruck

Playing career^{1}
Years	Club	Games (Goals)
1991–1994	Carlton	23 (14)
1995	Fitzroy	5 (7)
Total		28 (21)
- ^{1} Playing statistics correct to the end of 1995.

Andrew Cavedon (born 5 November 1971) is a former Australian rules footballer who played for the Fitzroy Football Club and Carlton Football Club in the Australian Football League (AFL). He attended Princes Hill Secondary College in Carlton North.
