= Mark Fraser (footballer, born 1971) =

Australian rules footballer and umpire

Personal information
- Born: 4 February 1971 (age 55)

Playing career^{1}
Years	Club	Games (Goals)	
1992–1994	Collingwood	45 (23)	
1995–2000	Essendon	65 (26)	

Umpiring career
Years	League	Role	Games
2001–2006	VFL	Field umpire	47
2005–2006	AFL	Field umpire	3
- ^{1} Playing statistics correct to the end of 2000.

Career highlights
- Harry Collier Trophy 1992

Mark Fraser (born 4 February 1971) is a former Australian rules footballer and umpire in the Australian Football League.

== Playing career ==
Fraser, from Montmorency, Victoria, is the son of former Essendon Football Club champion Ken, who played 198 games over 11 seasons with them. Mark debuted with Collingwood in 1992 and played 14 games in his first season.

After 45 games with Collingwood, Fraser quit the club and was recruited by his father's former club, Essendon. He was played on the wing position but was only a depth player in his first 3 seasons at the club, and it wasn't until 1998 that he became a regular senior team member. In 1999 he continued his good form, which included a 27-disposal haul against Melbourne in Round 22.

2000 was Fraser's final year, and not being able to break into the premiership winning side saw him forced into retirement after 65 games with the Bombers, for a career total of 110.

== Umpiring career ==
Fraser pursued a career in umpiring following his retirement and by 2001 had umpired in the Victorian Football League. In 2004, Fraser was brought onto the AFL umpires' rookie list, and debuted in a Wizard Cup match in 2004.

Fraser became the first ex-VFL/AFL player since the 1950s to also officiate as a field umpire in the AFL when he was selected to umpire the match between the Brisbane Lions and the Western Bulldogs at the Gabba on 7 May 2005. He was praised by umpires coach Jeff Gieschen for his "decision-making" but was criticised for his poor bouncing, which led to talk from coaches in the AFL looking at removing the centre bounce from the game. Fraser umpired three matches during this stint and remained on the list for 2006, but he was injured before Round 1.

In May 2007, Fraser announced his retirement from umpiring after only 5 games due a hip injury. He became chairman of the AFL Match Review Panel in 2010.
