= Jose Romero (Australian footballer) =

Australian rules footballer (born 1971)

Personal information
- Full name: Jose Michael Romero
- Nickname: Hose
- Born: 1 August 1971 (age 55); Easter Island, Chile
- Original team: Jacana
- Height: 173 cm (5 ft 8 in)
- Weight: 74 kg (163 lb)

Playing career^{1}
Years	Club	Games (Goals)
1988–1994	North Melbourne	89 (98)
1995–2001	Western Bulldogs	122 (71)
Total		211 (169)
- ^{1} Playing statistics correct to the end of 2001.

Career highlights
- Charles Sutton Medal: 1996

Jose Michael Romero (born 1 August 1971 in Chile), is a former Australian rules footballer.

Romero, who was recruited from Jacana, played in the VFL/AFL for both the North Melbourne FC and Western Bulldogs.

Romero's family immigrated to Australia from Chile when he was aged 7. His father is a distant cousin of St Oscar Romero of El Salvador.. He has three children.

Debuting in 1987 with the Kangaroos, Romero played 109 games for the club before moving to the Western Bulldogs, debuting in 1995.

Romero, known during his career for his fitness and endurance, still holds the AFL beep test record of 17.1.

Injury meant that the 1996 Charles Sutton Medallist (the Best and Fairest Award for the Bulldogs) was forced to retire during the 2001 season. Romero served a stint as the club runner for the Bulldogs, as well as previously being part of the club's football department and serving as a member of the board.
