= Ashley Blurton =

Australian rules footballer

Personal information
- Full name: Ashley Wayne Blurton
- Born: 5 March 1975 (age 51)
- Original team: West Perth (WAFL)
- Debut: Round 13, 1 July 1995, West Coast vs. Geelong, at Kardinia Park
- Height: 177 cm (5 ft 10 in)
- Weight: 81 kg (179 lb)

Playing career^{1}
Years	Club	Games (Goals)
1995–1997	West Coast	10 (2)
1998–1999	Richmond	14 (7)
Total		24 (9)
- ^{1} Playing statistics correct to the end of 1999.

Ashley Wayne Blurton (born 5 March 1975) is an Indigenous former Australian rules football player who played in the AFL between 1995 and 1997 for the West Coast Eagles Football Club and in 1998 and 1999 for the Richmond Football Club.
