= 1997 AFL Grand Final =

Grand final of the 1997 Australian Football League season

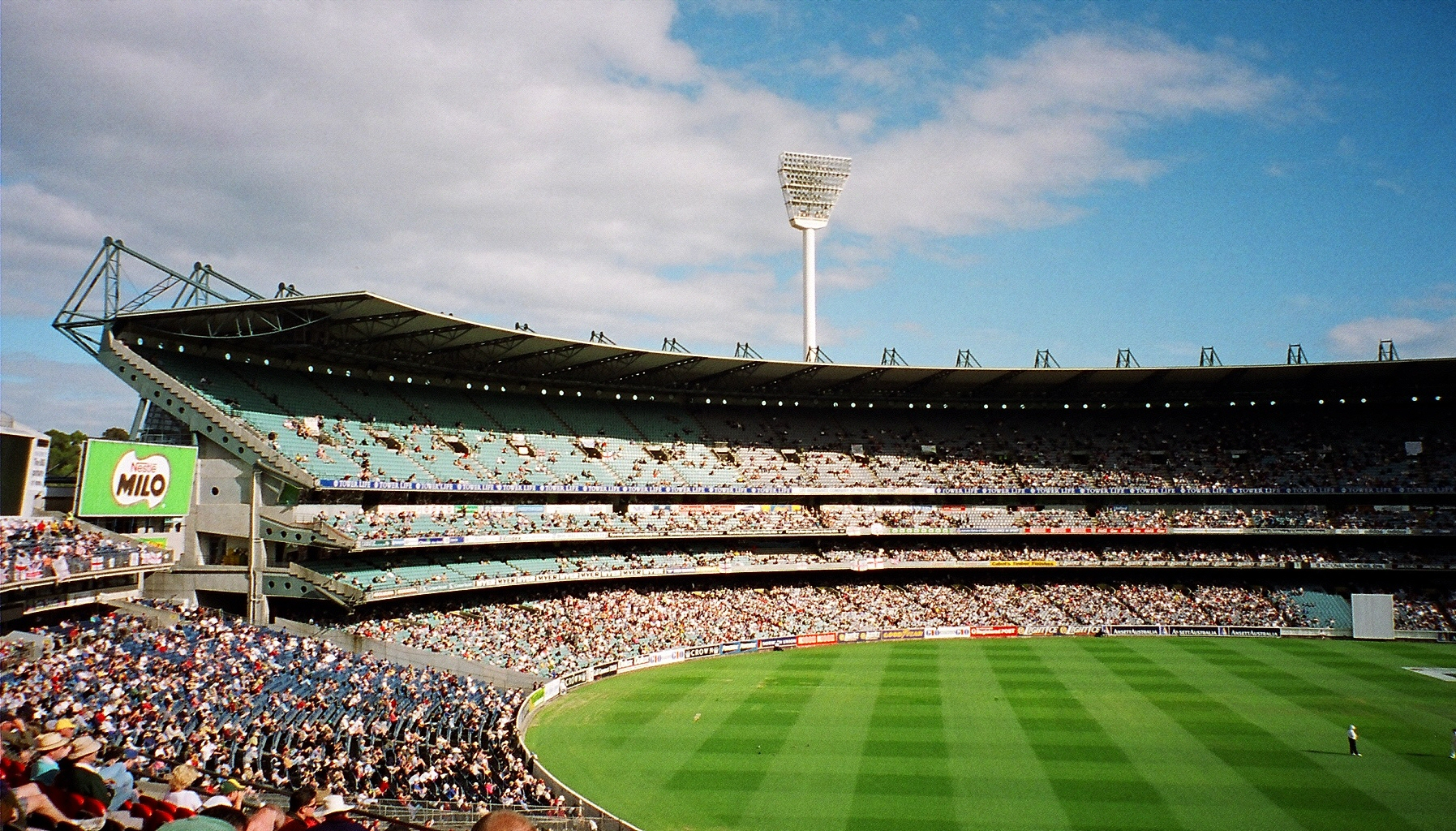
- The Melbourne Cricket Ground, where the 1997 AFL Grand Final took place.

Adelaide	St Kilda
19.11 (125)	13.16 (94)
	1	2	3	4
ADE	3.8 (26)	5.10 (40)	11.11 (77)	19.11 (125)
STK	3.6 (24)	7.11 (53)	9.13 (67)	13.16 (94)
- Date: 27 September 1997
- Stadium: Melbourne Cricket Ground
- Attendance: 99,645
- Favourite: St Kilda
- Umpires: Hayden Kennedy (7), Bryan Sheehan (9), Mark Nash (14)
- Coin toss won by: St Kilda
- Kicked toward: Punt Road End

Ceremonies
- Pre-match entertainment: Marina Prior
- National anthem: Marina Prior

Accolades
- Norm Smith Medallist: Andrew McLeod (Adelaide)
- Jock McHale Medallist: Malcolm Blight

Broadcast in Australia
- Network: Seven Network
- Commentators: Bruce McAvaney (host and commentator); Dennis Cometti (commentator); Sandy Roberts (commentator); Leigh Matthews (expert commentator); Peter McKenna ("sharp shooter"); Robert Dipierdomenico (boundary rider); Neil Kerley (boundary rider); Russell Morris (boundary rider)

The 1997 AFL Grand Final was an Australian rules football game contested between the Adelaide Football Club and the St Kilda Football Club, held at the Melbourne Cricket Ground in Melbourne on 27 September 1997. It was the 101st annual grand final of the Australian Football League (formerly the Victorian Football League), staged to determine the premiers for the 1997 AFL season. The match, attended by 99,645 spectators, was won by Adelaide by a margin of 31 points, marking that club's first premiership victory.

== Background ==
The Saints were playing in their first premiership decider since losing the 1971 VFL Grand Final, and looking to win just their second premiership after their famous one-point win against Collingwood in 1966, while the Crows were appearing in their first Grand final since entering the competition in 1991.

It had been a very even home-and-away season, with St Kilda finishing on top of the AFL ladder after 22 rounds, winning the McClelland Trophy with a record of 15 wins and 7 losses. No other team before or since has finished on top of the ladder with more than 6 losses, highlighting how even season 1997 was. The Saints had won their last seven matches to overtake Geelong and claim top spot by percentage. Adelaide, who had brought in Malcolm Blight as coach and future coach Neil Craig as fitness advisor, had finished fourth with 13 wins and 9 losses. They had made the finals for only the second time in their club history, after losing in a preliminary final in 1993 to eventual premiers Essendon. Tony Modra was the club's leading goalkicker for the fifth-straight season, with a total of 84.

The finals series was contested using the McIntyre final eight system. Adelaide won their qualifying final encounter against West Coast at Football Park by 33 points. They won their second final, also at Football Park, by 8 points against Geelong, in a game perhaps best remembered for a crucial mark not being paid to Geelong's Leigh Colbert during a critical period in the third quarter. The Crows then progressed to a preliminary final against the Western Bulldogs at the MCG, in which they trailed for most of the match. The Bulldogs' Tony Liberatore famously celebrated what he thought was a winning goal early in the last quarter, but it was a behind; Adelaide then scored the last four goals of the match to snatch victory by 2 points. However, in this game, Adelaide lost Modra in the first quarter to an ACL injury, meaning he would not be available for the grand final.

St Kilda won their qualifying final against the eighth-placed Brisbane Lions by 46 points at Waverley Park before a crowd of over 50,000, sending them to a home preliminary final against seventh-placed North Melbourne at the MCG, which they won by 31 points in front of crowd of 87,531. The Saints went into the grand final as heavy favourites.

St Kilda's Robert Harvey won the Brownlow Medal earlier in the week for having been deemed by the field umpires as being the best player in the AFL for the 1997 season, a feat he would repeat the following year. Western Bulldogs player Chris Grant polled the highest number of votes, but as he had been suspended for a one-match ban—in Round 7 against Hawthorn for striking—he was deemed ineligible for the award.

== Teams ==
Adelaide	St Kilda

Adelaide
B:	44 Peter Caven	35 Rod Jameson	34 Ben Hart
HB:	23 Andrew McLeod	15 David Pittman	36 Simon Goodwin
C:	14 Matthew Connell	3 Darren Jarman	5 Kym Koster
HF:	24 Clay Sampson	10 Matthew Robran	7 Nigel Smart
F:	42 Chad Rintoul	13 Shane Ellen	18 Troy Bond
Foll:	52 Shaun Rehn	28 Kane Johnson	26 Mark Bickley (Capt)
Int:	9 Tyson Edwards	11 Brett James	20 Aaron Keating
Coach:	Malcolm Blight		

St Kilda
B:	19 Steven Sziller	31 Jamie Shanahan	1 Justin Peckett
HB:	18 Jason Cripps	15 Darryl Wakelin	8 Max Hudghton
C:	34 Jayson Daniels	29 Andrew Thompson	5 Austinn Jones
HF:	22 Matthew Lappin	23 Stewart Loewe (Capt)	17 Rod Keogh
F:	25 Barry Hall	24 Jason Heatley	7 Nicky Winmar
Foll:	42 Brett Cook	35 Robert Harvey	3 Nathan Burke (Capt)
Int:	2 Tony Brown	13 David Sierakowski	16 Robert Neill
Coach:	Stan Alves		

== Match summary ==
With over 99,000 in attendance, the crowd was the largest for a VFL/AFL Grand Final since 1986. On a sombre note, it was revealed during the pre-match coverage that St Kilda star Nicky Winmar's father Neal had died from heart disease at the age of 50 the day before the grand final. The St Kilda players wore black armbands in his honour. In an odd coincidence, the two opposing coaches, Stan Alves and Malcolm Blight, had been premiership teammates for North Melbourne exactly 20 years earlier.

=== First quarter ===
It was an intense and exciting Grand Final, with Adelaide starting well and leading by 2 points at quarter time (with unlikely goalkicker Shane Ellen, who was playing at full-forward to replace the injured Tony Modra, kicking the Crows first goal—a move which was later regarded as a masterstroke by coach Malcolm Blight). St Kilda's Austinn Jones kicked what was universally considered the goal of the match, or what could have been the goal of the year had the award be eligible for goals kicked in finals. In an effort reminiscent of Phil Manassa in the 1977 VFL Grand final replay, Jones ran almost the full length of the ground and kicked the goal on his non-preferred left foot from just inside the 50-metre arc.

=== Second quarter ===
Inspired by Jones's heroics, the Saints began the second term strongly and took control for the only time in the game when Barry Hall broke away from Peter Caven to kick three goals in four minutes. For the rest of the match, Caven had the better of the duel.
The Crows maintained their composure. Simon Goodwin took a handball from Troy Bond and snapped truly. Ten minutes later, Bond himself added a goal from a tight angle after Chad Rintoul cleverly knocked the ball back into play. But just before the break, a snap by Harvey put St Kilda twelve points up and held the Crows at bay.

=== Third quarter ===
The third term belonged to Adelaide, inspired mainly by the brilliance of Andrew McLeod, who was now playing in the midfield. Bond, from a free kick paid 45 metres out, began the second half with a goal; and, although Loewe, well held by Pittman, answered for St Kilda, the Crows then scored what could be considered a fortuitous goal when Rintoul's 65-metre bomb took a shocking bounce over Max Hudghton's head and went through. On a roll, the Crows quickly scored again with the brilliant Ellen, now playing half-back, drifting downfield to mark unattended two metres out.

=== Fourth quarter ===
With the game still in the balance, Blight made another winning tactical move, swinging the mercurial Darren Jarman, who had played most of the game in the midfield, to full-forward. Jarman would live up to his reputation as one of the finest sharpshooters, kicking five straight goals for the quarter; it would be last time a player would score six or more goals in an AFL Grand Final until 2021 when Bayley Fritsch also scored six goals. The Saints continued to fight to stay in the game, but Jarman's final goal for the quarter, an elegant snap off a quarter-step around his body on a tight angle from 35 metres, split the middle to make certain that the premiership was headed to South Australia.

=== Aftermath ===
Adelaide became the first team to win four consecutive finals to claim the AFL premiership—a feat matched by the Western Bulldogs in 2016 and Brisbane Lions in 2024.
The Norm Smith Medal was presented by Fitzroy legend Kevin Murray to Andrew McLeod, who, at 21 years old, was the youngest player since Wayne Harmes to win the award. Named on a half-back flank against Matthew Lappin, McLeod was instrumental in foiling a number of St Kilda attacks in an even first quarter. However, in one of several successful positional moves he would make for the match, Malcolm Blight sensed McLeod would be even more damaging in a midfield role. Making full use of his pace, agility and ball-winning skills, McLeod kept his side in the game when the Saints looked to pull away, and then continued to pump the ball into attack as the Crows eventually took control in the second half. He finished the game with 18 kicks, 13 handpasses and 11 marks. Shane Ellen, typically a defensive player for the Crows, provided a cameo at full-forward in place of Modra and finished with five goals, while Darren Jarman booted a grand final record of five in the last quarter, taking him to six for the match and sealing the game. Other influential Crows players included Shaun Rehn, Kane Johnson, David Pittman, Troy Bond and Ben Hart.

St Kilda defender Justin Peckett, reflecting on the game over 20 years later, admitted to feeling an ominous sense of dread in the second half as the Crows finished the game strongly:

My memories going into the day was one of super excitement and then it became an absolute nightmare in that second half. When the siren blows it’s the worst experience that you’ve ever had, so you get all of that in the one day. As the game was unfolding in that second half in particular, you get the sense that this is it, we’re done, it’s devastating.

In 2020, AFL journalist Damian Barrett rated Jarman's five-goal last quarter as the most memorable finals moment he had witnessed, calling it "the greatest individual quarter ever played" and claiming that there was no chance the Crows would have won the premiership without him.

== Scorecard ==
1997 AFL Grand Final
Saturday, 27 September (2:30 pm)	St Kilda	def. by	Adelaide	MCG (crowd: 99,645)	Report
3.6 (24); 7.11 (53); 9.13 (67); 13.16 (94)	Q1; Q2; Q3; Final	3.8 (26); 5.10 (40); 11.11 (77); 19.11 (125)	Umpires: Kennedy, Sheehan, Nash; Norm Smith Medal: Andrew McLeod (Adelaide); Television broadcast: Seven Network; National anthem: Marina Prior
Heatley, Hall 3 Loewe 2 Jones, Burke, Winmar, Peckett, Harvey 1	Goals	6 Jarman; 5 Ellen; 4 Bond; 1 Smart, Goodwin, Rintoul, Caven
Harvey, Jones, Burke, Hall, Wakelin, Cook, Keogh	Best	McLeod, Jarman, Johnson, Ellen, Bond, Goodwin, Caven, Pittman, Rehn, Hart
Injuries	Jameson (hamstring)

== See also ==
- 1997 AFL season

== Bibliography ==
- Atkinson, Graeme; Atkinson, Brant (2009). The Complete Book of AFL Finals (4th ed.). Scoresby, Victoria: The Five Mile Press. ISBN 9781742112756.
- Main, Jim (2006). When it matters most : the Norm Smith Medallist and best on ground in every Grand Final. Melbourne, Victoria: Bas Publishing. ISBN 1920910689.
