= Justin Peckett =

Australian rules footballer (born 1972)

Personal information
- Nickname: Frankie
- Born: 5 October 1972 (age 54)
- Original team: Karingal, Victoria
- Debut: Round 4, 22 April 1992, St Kilda Football Club vs. Hawthorn, at Moorabbin Oval
- Height: 182 cm (6 ft 0 in)
- Weight: 83 kg (183 lb)

Playing career^{1}
Years	Club	Games (Goals)
1992–2006	St Kilda	252 (50)
- ^{1} Playing statistics correct to the end of 2006.

Career highlights
- St Kilda AFL Pre-season Cup Winning Side 1996, 2004; St Kilda Minor Premiership Side 1997; 2nd in Trevor Barker Award St Kilda Best and Fairest 1994; 3rd in Trevor Barker Award St Kilda Best and Fairest 1997

Justin Peckett (born 5 October 1972) is an Australian rules footballer in the Australian Football League (AFL).

Picked up by the St Kilda Saints as an impressive 16-year-old, Peckett won the St Kilda under-19s' best and fairest in 1990 and remained on the list for the 1991 season, before he was delisted at the end of the year.

He was picked up in the 1992 pre-season draft at pick #49 to resurrect his career, and debuted late that season (receiving limited game time in his only game for that year). He was selected as a utility player who could play a number of roles, particularly as a small midfielder or a small half back player. He finished second in the Trevor Barker Award, St Kilda's award for their best and fairest player, in 1994, and third in 1997.

Peckett played in St Kilda's 1996 AFL Ansett Australia Cup winning side.

Peckett played in all 22 matches in the 1997 AFL Premiership Season's home and away rounds in which St Kilda Football Club qualified in first position for the 1997 AFL Finals Series, winning the club's second Minor Premiership and first McClelland Trophy.

Peckett was a stalwart of the St Kilda Football Club, and was part of an experienced group of veterans at the Saints who have decided to continue on in 2006 for one last shot at a premiership. These players included Stephen Powell, Andrew Thompson and Robert Harvey; however, a premiership did not eventuate for the club in 2006, with Peckett announcing his retirement soon after the club's exit from the finals series.

Peckett is married to Teresa and has seven children.

Peckett was one of the four St Kilda players featured at the start of the 1995 music video for "Greg! The Stop Sign!!" by Australian band TISM.

Justin is now a facilitator at Leading Teams.
