= Shane Ellen =

Australian rules footballer, born 1973

Personal information
- Full name: Shane Ellen
- Born: 1 January 1973 (age 53)
- Original team: Melton / Coburg
- Height: 188 cm (6 ft 2 in)
- Weight: 82 kg (181 lb)

Playing career^{1}
Years	Club	Games (Goals)
1993–1995	Footscray	11 (1)
1996–2000	Adelaide	54 (15)
Total		65 (16)
- ^{1} Playing statistics correct to the end of 2000.

Career highlights
- 2× AFL Premiership player (1997, 1998)

Shane Ellen (born 1 January 1973) is a former Australian rules footballer who played in the Australian Football League (AFL).

== Bulldogs career ==
Ellen, a Footscray local, made his debut with the Bulldogs in 1993, and when he left in 1995 he had played just 11 games for 1 goal. He was then delisted, before being selected by the Adelaide Football Club in the 1996 Pre-season Draft.

== Adelaide career ==
He arrived at the Crows in 1996 and was a largely unheralded player. That was until the 1997 AFL Grand Final against St Kilda. This proved to be a defining moment in his career, until the journeyman's AFL career ended at the end of 2000, after 54 games and 15 goals with the club.

=== 1997 Grand Final ===
In the 1997 Grand Final, Ellen was considered the unlikely hero for the Crows. In the first half he booted two goals from full-forward, playing there in place of the injured Tony Modra. He was then switched to the half-back line by coach Malcolm Blight, which proved to be an inspired move – Ellen kicked three of his five goals for the match after half-time.

This amazing performance was accentuated by the fact he had kicked just three goals in his previous 38 AFL matches. After the 1997 Grand Final, he kicked eight more goals for the remainder of his career.

== Statistics ==
Legend
G	Goals	K	Kicks	D	Disposals	T	Tackles
B	Behinds	H	Handballs	M	Marks

Season	Team	No.	Games	Totals							Averages (per game)						
Season	Team	No.	Games	G	B	K	H	D	M	T	G	B	K	H	D	M	T
1993	Footscray	47	4	0	1	22	9	31	6	2	0.0	0.3	5.5	2.3	7.8	1.5	0.5
1994	Footscray	20	0	—	—	—	—	—	—	—	—	—	—	—	—	—	—
1995	Footscray	20	7	1	2	36	7	43	8	3	0.1	0.3	5.1	1.0	6.1	1.1	0.4
1996	Adelaide	13	17	2	1	128	78	206	55	17	0.1	0.1	7.5	4.6	12.1	3.2	1.0
1997	Adelaide	13	10	5	2	70	45	115	39	14	0.5	0.2	7.0	4.5	11.5	3.9	1.4
1998	Adelaide	13	17	7	9	122	46	168	45	21	0.4	0.5	7.2	2.7	9.9	2.6	1.2
1999	Adelaide	13	6	1	1	22	10	32	11	2	0.2	0.2	3.7	1.7	5.3	1.8	0.3
2000	Adelaide	13	4	0	3	28	5	33	13	1	0.0	0.8	7.0	1.3	8.3	3.3	0.3
Career			65	16	19	428	200	628	177	60	0.2	0.3	6.6	3.1	9.7	2.7	0.9
