= 1989 Panasonic Cup =

1989 Panasonic Cup is the name of two Australian sporting competitions:

- 1989 Panasonic Cup (Australian rules football)
- 1989 Panasonic Cup (rugby league)
