= Andrew Thompson (footballer) =

Australian rules footballer, born 1972

Personal information
- Full name: Andrew Charles Thompson
- Born: 21 October 1972 (age 54)
- Original team: Old Melburnians (VAFA)
- Debut: Round 1, 29 March 1997, St Kilda vs. Hawthorn, at Waverley Park

Playing career^{1}
Years	Club	Games (Goals)
1997–2007	St Kilda	221 (93)
- ^{1} Playing statistics correct to the end of 2007.

Career highlights
- St. Kilda Football Club Best and Fairest – Trevor Barker Award 2000; Pre-Season Cup Winning side 2004; 1999 Channel 7 Player of the Year; St. Kilda Football Club Life Member

Andrew Charles Thompson (born 21 October 1972) is a retired Australian rules footballer for the St Kilda Football Club in the Australian Football League.

Thompson was recruited in the 1996 AFL draft at pick no 62 and was picked up from the VAFA club Old Melburnians. At the time of his recruitment Thompson was 24 years of age, relatively old for an AFL footballer to begin his career. Thompson later said that being recruited at a late age allowed him to become more travelled and worldly than other footballers who begin their careers at 17 or 18 years of age.

Thompson quickly established himself in the St Kilda line-up in 1997, missing only two games (in Rounds 2 and 3) and playing every game from Round 4 onwards, including St Kilda's loss in the Grand Final.

Thompson played in 20 of 22 matches in the 1997 AFL Premiership Season home and away rounds in which St Kilda Football Club qualified in first position for the 1997 AFL Finals Series, winning the club's 2nd Minor Premiership and 1st McClelland Trophy.

Thompson was noted for his hard work ethic and consistency and this led to him winning the 1999 Channel 7 Player of the Year Award. His outstanding and consistent form also earned him a Trevor Barker Award for St Kilda's Best and Fairest player in 2000. Despite a dismal year for the Saints, when they finished last, Thompson continued toiling and was a shining light in an otherwise disappointing side.

Thompson played in St Kilda's 2004 Wizard Home Loans Cup winning side – St Kilda's second AFL Cup win.

Thompson signed a one-year contract with the Saints for the 2006 season and was part of a veteran group with Justin Peckett and Stephen Powell who signed on for one last shot at a premiership. He made a solid contribution for the season, and new coach Ross Lyon signed him up for one last time at the beginning of the 2007 year.

In his last season, Thompson battled injury and fitness issues, but managed 10 matches for the Saints. He farewelled the football world on 1 September, playing his final game on the MCG against Richmond. Fellow Saint Fraser Gehrig also announced his retirement, and both players were chaired off the ground.

Thompson has worked part-time in the finance and business world since 2004.
