= Peter Caven =

Australian rules footballer

Personal information
- Full name: Peter Caven
- Born: 16 May 1970 (age 56); New South Wales
- Original team: Montmorency (DVFL)
- Height: 190 cm (6 ft 3 in)
- Weight: 85 kg (187 lb)

Playing career^{1}
Years	Club	Games (Goals)
1991–1993	Fitzroy	39 (17)
1994–1995	Sydney	18 (4)
1996–2000	Adelaide	82 (34)
Total		139 (55)
- ^{1} Playing statistics correct to the end of 2000.

Career highlights
- 2× AFL Premiership player: 1997, 1998; Adelaide Team of the Decade - Half back

Peter Caven (born 16 May 1970) is a former Australian rules footballer who played in the Australian Football League. He played initially as a nagging, sometimes ungainly but effective defender and built on this base to become a sweeping counterattacking central defender. He began his career at Fitzroy before playing at the Sydney Swans and finally at Adelaide where he was a 2-time premiership player.

== Career ==
=== Fitzroy ===
Caven was zoned to Fitzroy and progressing from under 17s and 19s to reserves under coach Robert Shaw before making his AFL debut in 1991 as a forward however Caven would go on to play a majority of career in defence. After three AFL seasons with Fitzroy, Caven could not come to terms with the club and left as an uncontracted signing to Sydney.

=== Sydney ===
In a match against St Kilda in Round 7, 1994, a clash with Tony Lockett's elbow left Caven with a broken cheekbone. Lockett received a suspension of eight weeks for the incident while Caven missed 12 weeks and returned to play the last four games of the season. In an absurd twist, Caven appeared on comedy television show Denton during the following week and, at the urging of host Andrew Denton, bashed an effigy of Lockett with a baseball bat. Caven was forced to issue an apology to Lockett. The following season, Caven and Lockett were teammates at Sydney.

He would only play 9 games in 1995; and, after failing to return to form after his broken cheek, Caven was told he is not good enough to play AFL football by Sydney football manager Rob Snowden.

=== Adelaide ===
The Crows were interested in Caven due to his previous connection with coach Robert Shaw and he was traded for Paul Rouvray at the end of the 1995 season. After a double hernia operation in pre season, Cavens first game was against Sydney in Round 1, 1996, where he had a point to prove. Playing on a half-forward flank he kicked four goals in a comfortable win. Caven played a majority of 1996 as a forward kicking 17 goals in 20 games.

In 1997, Caven found himself out of favour with new coach Malcolm Blight and started the season playing for Sturt in the SANFL. He returned for the Crows in round 4 and played 22 games including the Grand Final win. Caven's form at centre half-back was so good that he was considered unfortunate to miss out on All-Australian selection.

The next year would prove to be another fine season for Caven, topped off with a magnificent performance in the 1998 Grand Final on Wayne Carey, where he kept him to one goal. Caven also collected 20 possessions and nine marks on the day.

== Statistics ==
Legend
G	Goals	K	Kicks	D	Disposals	T	Tackles
B	Behinds	H	Handballs	M	Marks

Season	Team	No.	Games	Totals							Averages (per game)						
Season	Team	No.	Games	G	B	K	H	D	M	T	G	B	K	H	D	M	T
1991	Fitzroy	50	8	8	4	43	27	70	13	5	1.0	0.5	5.4	3.4	8.8	1.6	0.6
1992	Fitzroy	22	22	6	10	179	65	244	74	35	0.3	0.5	8.1	3.0	11.1	3.4	1.6
1993	Fitzroy	22	9	3	2	43	47	90	23	12	0.3	0.2	4.8	5.2	10.0	2.6	1.3
1994	Sydney	26	9	3	2	41	31	72	19	11	0.3	0.2	4.6	3.4	8.0	2.1	1.2
1995	Sydney	26	9	1	1	45	20	65	24	3	0.1	0.1	5.0	2.2	7.2	2.7	0.3
1996	Adelaide	44	20	17	19	143	85	228	90	18	0.9	1.0	7.2	4.3	11.4	4.5	0.9
1997	Adelaide	44	22	6	9	264	94	358	116	30	0.3	0.4	12.0	4.3	16.3	5.3	1.4
1998	Adelaide	44	24	9	7	219	75	294	99	43	0.4	0.3	9.1	3.1	12.3	4.1	1.8
1999	Adelaide	44	8	0	3	48	26	74	20	10	0.0	0.4	6.0	3.3	9.3	2.5	1.3
2000	Adelaide	44	8	2	2	48	32	80	17	12	0.3	0.3	6.0	4.0	10.0	2.1	1.5
Career			139	55	59	1073	502	1575	495	179	0.4	0.4	7.7	3.6	11.3	3.6	1.3
