= Austinn Jones =

Australian rules footballer, born 1976

Personal information
- Full name: Austinn Gregg Jones
- Nickname: Aussie
- Born: 28 September 1976 (age 50)
- Original team: Beaconsfield/Southern Stingrays
- Draft: 48th overall, 1994 National Draft
- Height: 176 cm (5 ft 9 in)
- Weight: 82 kg (181 lb)
- Positions: Wing, half back flank

Playing career^{1}
Years	Club	Games (Goals)
1995–2005	St Kilda	226 (127)

International team honours^{2}
Years	Team	Games (Goals)
2004	Australia	? (?)
- ^{1} Playing statistics correct to the end of 2005.^{2} Representative statistics correct as of 2004.

Career highlights
- All-Australian team: 1997, 2004; Pre Season Premiership: 1996, 2004; AFL Rising Star nominee: 1995

Austinn Gregg "Aussie" Jones (born 28 September 1976) is a former Australian rules footballer who played with St Kilda in the Australian Football League (AFL).

The 1.76 m (5 ft 9 1/2 in) Jones played for the Collingwood reserves in the mid-1990s, but they were afraid to recruit him due to him weighing just 64 kilograms. "Aussie", as he is more commonly known, refused to give up on his dream to play AFL football, and was recruited to St Kilda in the 1994 AFL draft. He made his debut in 1995 still weighing in at the high 60s.

In 1996 and 1997, Jones established himself as one of the league's better wingers/half-back flankers, with his pace and hard running a big advantage for the Saints.

Jones played in St Kilda's victorious 1996 pre-season grand final side—the club's first pre-season premiership.

Jones played in 22 of 22 matches in the 1997 home-and-away rounds in which St Kilda qualified in first position for the 1997 AFL finals, winning the club's second minor premiership. St Kilda would make it to the 1997 AFL Grand Final but would lose to Adelaide by 31 points, their first of two successive premierships, although Jones kicked a goal and was among his side's best players.

Jones's stellar 1997 season was capped off by earning All-Australian selection.

In fact, Jones put the Saints in a very strong position, kicking a Goal of the Year contender with a magnificent long run and goal. At that stage during that game, the Saints had a comfortable lead, and the Jones goal looked like the team would run away with the game. It was not to be, however, with the Saints forfeiting a half-time lead to lose the match.

Jones played in St Kilda's victorious 2004 pre-season grand final side—St Kilda's second pre-season final win.

Jones career suffered from inconsistency in the following years; however, in 2004, the first year St Kilda had made the finals since 1998, Jones again won All-Australian selection and was back to his best. However, Jones, even then, doubted whether he would be able to cope with the mental pressures of AFL football, and was even considering retirement at just 27 years old.

In 2005, he suffered a major setback when he was dropped to the Victorian Football League midway through the year. Although he regained his form, Jones admitted that he was at his lowest ebb as a player at this stage. He fought his way back into the seniors and performed admirably during the Saints' late-season charge into the top four.

Despite hinting at his retirement previously, it was a huge shock when Jones called it quits from the game with one year to run on his contract, having just turned 29. He cited the mental pressures, more than the physical toll, as the reason for his retirement. In 2006, he was the contracted as the player-coach at country football club the Narre Warren Magpies. His venture as coach was a successful one; in his first year as coach, the team won the Casey Cardinia Football League grand final. Jones coached Narre Warren again in 2007.

Narre Warren, under the guidance of Aussie Jones in his last game as player-coach, secured the second of two back-to-back premierships on 22 September 2007. He coached Gippsland Power in the 2008 TAC Cup season.

In July 2012, Jones was appointed as head coach of the newly formed standalone VFL team Bendigo Gold, with his coaching stint to commence in Gold's inaugural year as a standalone VFL side in 2013.

== Statistics ==
Legend
G	Goals	K	Kicks	D	Disposals	T	Tackles
B	Behinds	H	Handballs	M	Marks

Season	Team	No.	Games	Totals							Averages (per game)							Votes
Season	Team	No.	Games	G	B	K	H	D	M	T	G	B	K	H	D	M	T	Votes
1995	St Kilda	29	19	10	7	134	82	216	33	20	0.5	0.4	7.1	4.3	11.4	1.7	1.1	0
1996	St Kilda	29	22	25	25	259	129	388	75	22	1.1	1.1	11.8	5.9	17.6	3.4	1.0	1
1997	St Kilda	5	25	22	9	323	167	490	77	32	0.9	0.4	12.9	6.7	19.6	3.1	1.3	5
1998	St Kilda	5	23	23	13	238	101	339	63	32	1.0	0.6	10.3	4.4	14.7	2.7	1.4	1
1999	St Kilda	5	19	12	18	180	82	262	72	18	0.6	0.9	9.5	4.3	13.8	3.8	0.9	2
2000	St Kilda	5	17	9	7	182	60	242	47	18	0.5	0.4	10.7	3.5	14.2	2.8	1.1	1
2001	St Kilda	5	16	4	3	206	80	286	46	20	0.3	0.2	12.9	5.0	17.9	2.9	1.3	5
2002	St Kilda	5	16	6	2	208	95	303	46	12	0.4	0.1	13.0	5.9	18.9	2.9	0.8	2
2003	St Kilda	5	22	7	3	317	108	425	85	30	0.3	0.1	14.4	4.9	19.3	3.9	1.4	3
2004	St Kilda	5	25	3	6	346	120	466	85	37	0.1	0.2	13.8	4.8	18.6	3.4	1.5	11
2005	St Kilda	5	22	6	3	252	93	345	73	31	0.3	0.1	11.5	4.2	15.7	3.3	1.4	1
Career			226	127	96	2645	1117	3762	702	272	0.6	0.4	11.7	4.9	16.6	3.1	1.2	32
