= Malcolm Blight =

Australian rules footballer (born 1950)

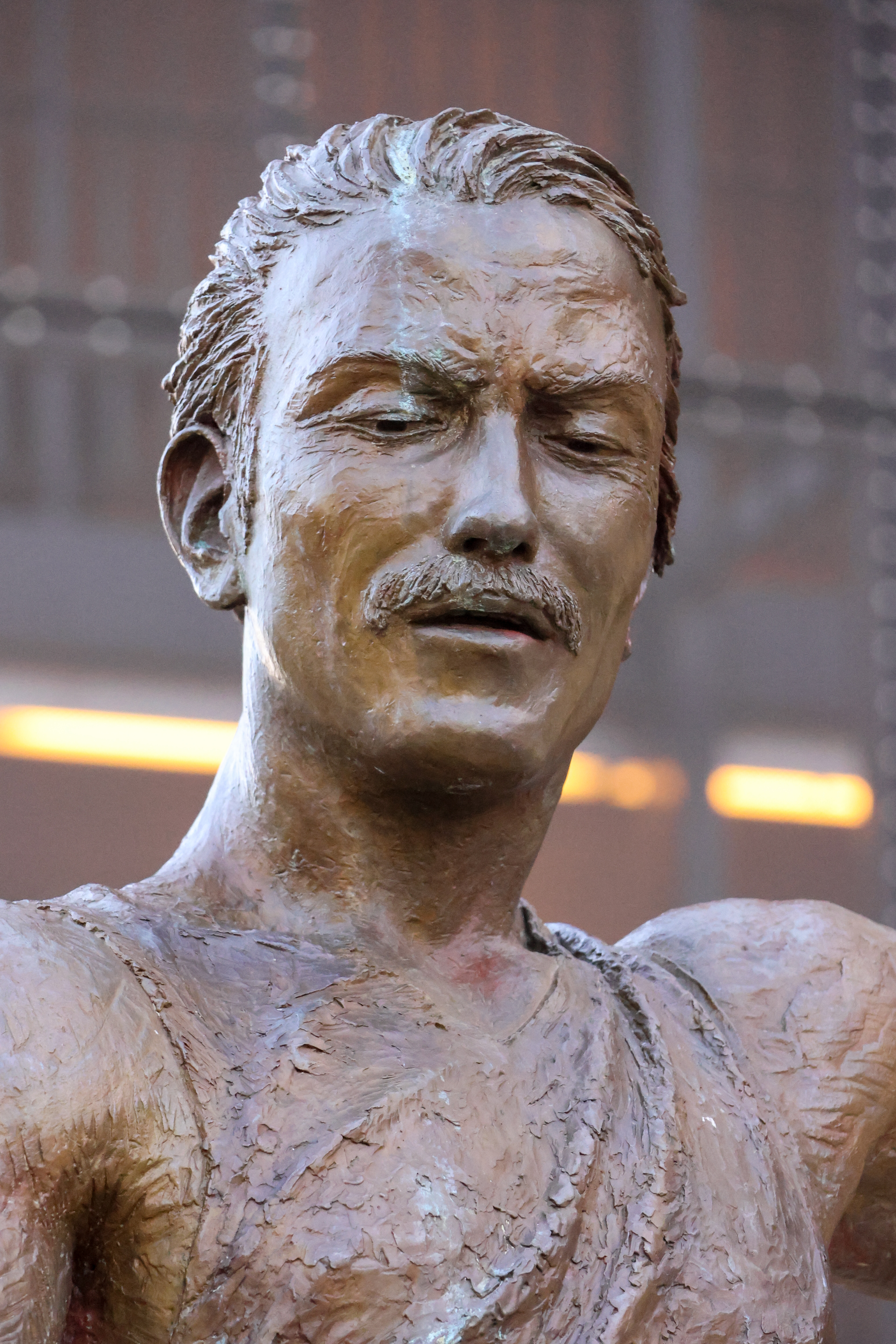
- Statue of Malcolm Blight at Adelaide Oval

Personal information
- Full name: Malcolm Jack Blight
- Nickname: Blighty
- Born: 16 February 1950 (age 76); Adelaide, South Australia
- Original team: Woodville (SANFL)
- Height: 182 cm (6 ft 0 in)
- Weight: 89 kg (196 lb)

Playing career^{1}
Years	Club	Games (Goals)
1968–73, 1983–85	Woodville	152 (342)
1974–1982	North Melbourne	178 (444)
Total		330 (786)

Representative team honours
Years	Team	Games (Goals)
	South Australia	7 (11)
	Victoria	7 (14)

Coaching career^{3}
Years	Club	Games (W–L–D)
1981	North Melbourne	16 (6–10–0)
1983–1987	Woodville	114 (41-73-0)
1989–1994	Geelong	145 (89–56–0)
1997–1999	Adelaide	74 (41–33–0)
2001	St Kilda	15 (3–12–0)
Total		364 (180–184–0)
- ^{1} Playing statistics correct to the end of 1985.^{3} Coaching statistics correct as of 2001.

Career highlights
- Club: 2× VFL Premiership player: (1975, 1977); Brownlow Medallist: (1978); Coleman Medallist: (1982); Syd Barker Medallist: (1978); 4× North Melbourne leading goalkicker: (1978, 1979, 1981, 1982); VFL Team of the Year: 1982; Magarey Medallist: (1972); Ken Farmer Medal: (1985); 2× Woodville Best & Fairest: (1972, 1985); Championship of Australia Championship: 1975; Woodville captain-coach 1983–85; Representative: National Football Carnival Championship: 1975; Captain of Victoria; Captain of South Australia; 2× All-Australian team 1972, 1985; Coaching: 2× AFL Premiership coach: (1997, 1998); Adelaide Team of the Decade; McClelland Trophy (1992); Honours: Australian Football Hall of Fame Inductee (1996); Australian Football Hall of Fame Legend (2017); SANFL Team of the Century (forward pocket); South Australian Football Hall of Fame (2002); Woodville Football Club Life Member; Woodville-West Torrens: Life Member; Woodville-West Torrens: Life Governor

Malcolm Jack Blight AM (born 16 February 1950) is a former Australian rules footballer who played for and coached the North Melbourne Football Club in the Victorian Football League (VFL) and Woodville Football Club in the South Australian National Football League (SANFL). He also coached the Geelong Football Club, Adelaide Football Club and St Kilda Football Club.

Blight is the only player to have kicked 100 goals in a season in both the VFL and the SANFL. He is also one of three players to have won the Brownlow Medal and the Magarey Medal. He was an inaugural inductee Australian Football Hall of Fame in 1996 and was elevated to Legend status in 2017. In addition, he has captained the state representative sides of both Victoria and South Australia.

In spite of his "failure" as a playing coach of North Melbourne, Blight cemented his reputation as one of the greatest coaches during his stints with Geelong and Adelaide, before finishing up in acrimonious circumstances at St Kilda. In 2012, Blight was appointed director of coaching at the Gold Coast Football Club.

The surname "Blight" is of Cornish origin.

== Football career ==
=== 1968–1973: First stint at Woodville ===
Blight grew up living just four streets from Woodville Oval. He supported Port Adelaide, with his favourite player at the time being forward Rex Johns. However, when Woodville began to play in the SANFL from 1964 Blight was in their recruiting zone, making his debut for the Woodpeckers in 1969. He had a break-out year in 1972, kicking 45 goals while playing mainly as a ruck-rover. He won Woodville's best and fairest award as well as the SANFL's highest individual honor, the Magarey Medal, bringing him to the attention of the VFL.

=== 1974–1982: Success in Victoria with North Melbourne ===
Blight was recruited by the North Melbourne Football Club and, although he was reluctant to join at first, he went on to play 178 games for the club between 1974 and 1982. He was a member of the Kangaroos' premiership sides in 1975 and 1977, and in 1978 won both the Brownlow Medal and the Syd Barker Medal for being the best and fairest player in the VFL and for North Melbourne respectively.

Blight was consistently one of the most brilliant players in the VFL during the 1970s. Besides taking spectacular marks, he was also a prolific goal kicker, renowned for his ability to use the torpedo punt. In 1982, Blight won the Coleman Medal as the leading the VFL goal scorer, and led the Kangaroos' goal kicking four times during his career.

==== Eighty-metre goal after the siren ====
It's not over yet – not over yet! What drama here at Princes Park! Malcolm Blight – it's a big kick, it's a mammoth kick...(ball passes between goal posts) whoa, I have seen it all!

— Mike Williamson's call of Blight's 70- to 80-metre after-the-siren goal against Carlton on HSV-7

In a moment that has since passed into Australian rules football folklore, Blight kicked a famous goal after the siren against Carlton in Round 10, 1976, (5 June). Carlton led by 14 points going into added time in the final quarter, but Blight kicked two goals, and then marked the ball an estimated 80 metres from goal, just seconds before the final siren. North Melbourne, trailing by one point, needed a behind to draw and a goal to win. Many assumed Blight's effort would be futile and spectators were already exiting the arena. However, Blight kicked one of the longest-ever torpedo punts, with the ball going through the goal at the height of the posts, achieving an improbable victory for the Kangaroos: 11.15 (81) to Carlton's 11.10 (76). (YouTube video)

This moment was the focus of a television commercial in the Toyota Legendary Moments series which featured Blight. (YouTube video)

==== Infamous moments ====
During the 1977 VFL season, which happened to be played during the wettest Melbourne winter in 40 years, North Melbourne hosted Hawthorn at Arden Street. The ground conditions were atrocious, and the match for the most part resembled something more akin to mud wrestling. Hawthorn led by one point when Blight was given a free kick and a set shot for goal. He scored a behind, which would have levelled the scores, but was given a second attempt after the umpire penalised Hawthorn for an infringement. Unfortunately for Blight and North Melbourne, the ball slewed off the side of his boot and went out of bounds on the full, giving the Hawks victory. In the drawn Grand Final, he was benched by Barassi after three quarters, but kept his place in the team for the replay and was one of the best players in their win.

Blight won the 1978 Brownlow Medal, but suffered a groin injury in the early minutes of the 1978 VFL Grand Final against Hawthorn.

In 1981, while still serving as playing coach, Blight made one of the most bizarre blunders ever seen in a football match. In North Melbourne's Round 14 clash against Richmond at the MCG, Blight was on the end of a chain of handpasses deep in the forward zone. He seemed certain to score a goal as he ran into the goal square, only to run past the goal posts and kick the ball through the behinds. As he said after the match when he realised his mistake: "I've never done that before. I'm probably going barmy." Richmond won the match by 43 points and, less than a month later, after six consecutive losses, Blight was sacked as playing coach. Freed of the coaching burden, he then kicked 11 goals against Footscray.

Blight was indirectly involved in another infamous football incident during the 1980 Escort Cup grand final against Collingwood, held at VFL Park, Waverley. Blight kicked the ball to Kerry Good as the siren sounded. However, the umpire did not hear the siren and awarded the mark to Good, who kicked the winning goal to win in controversial circumstances.

=== 1983–1985: Return to Woodville ===
After his stint in the VFL, Blight returned to Woodville, serving as captain-coach from 1983 to 1985 before continuing as non-playing coach in 1986 and 1987. He was club best and fairest in 1983 and in his last season of playing football (1985) topped the league goalkicking list with 126 goals.

=== Other matches ===
Blight also scored 66 goals in 30 pre-season/night series matches - 21 in 11 matches for Woodville and 45 in 19 matches for North Melbourne - as well as 25 goals in 14 interstate/State of Origin football matches - 11 in seven matches for South Australia and 14 in seven matches for Victoria. If these are considered, Blight played a total of 374 senior career games and kicked 877 senior career goals. The VFL/AFL lists Blight's total as 355 senior career games and 832 senior career goals, excluding his pre-season/night series matches for North Melbourne.

Blight also played 19 matches and kicked 37 goals in the SANFL reserves for Woodville: if these are considered, Blight played a total of 393 overall career games and kicked 914 overall career goals.

== Coaching and after coaching ==
Blight later became a successful coach famous for employing unorthodox, and at times controversial, coaching methods as attempts to motivate his players.

=== Player-coach at North Melbourne ===
Appointed player-coach in 1981 after Ron Barassi departed, Blight was sacked as coach after six consecutive losses. The following week he rebounded with a club-record 11 goal haul against Footscray, at the Western Oval. Once again, Blight's inaccurate kicking for goal may have prevented him from kicking a club record of a possible 16 to 17 goals. Blight's total as playing coach (Wayne Schimmelbusch was captain) was 16 games (6 wins, 10 losses) and the last of the playing coaches in the VFL.

=== Back at Woodville ===
Playing coach 1983 to 1985, continued as non-playing coach to 1987. His tenure as coach coincided with the club's most successful season (1986) in the entire history of the Woodville Football Club, when they reached the Preliminary Final. During the season the Warriors (who had changed from being known as the Woodpeckers to the Warriors in 1983) had defeated their hated "big brother" Port Adelaide once during the minor round at Woodville Oval (drawing the oval's ground record attendance of 11,026 to their Round 18 clash), and also in the First Semi-final at Football Park, before going down to eventual premiers Glenelg in the Preliminary Final.

=== Geelong Football Club senior coach (1989–1994): High-Voltage Football, September Disappointment ===
Blight was appointed successor to John Devine at Geelong as senior coach for the 1989 VFL season. In Blight's first year at Geelong, he guided them to the 1989 Grand Final but fell short to Hawthorn by six points. In the 1990 season, Geelong under Blight finished tenth on the ladder with eight wins and fourteen losses, missing out of the finals. In the 1991 season, Blight guided Geelong to finish third on the ladder, but were eliminated in the Preliminary Final by West Coast Eagles. Blight guided Geelong again to the Grand Final in 1992 but fell short again to West Coast Eagles by twenty-eight points. In the 1993 season, Blight guided Geelong to finish seventh on the ladder with twelve wins and eight losses, just missing out of the finals.

The Cats players warmed to his all-out attack philosophy, to such an extent that they broke the record for aggregate points in a home-and-away season (2916), which would again be broken in 1992 when they became the first (and so far only) team to score an aggregate of 3000 points in a home-and-away season. In the semi-final against Melbourne, aware that the Demons intended to put a hard tag on their classy midfielders Paul Couch and Mark Bairstow, Blight started them on the interchange bench, and Geelong ended up winning by 63 points.

In an interview with Gerard Whateley in 2019, Blight opened up about the day he knew his time as Geelong coach was finished. In Round 12 of the 1994 AFL season, Geelong were hosting St Kilda at Kardinia Park, and at last break the unfancied Saints held a 26-point lead after kicking seven goals to none in the third quarter. The frustrated home fans directed their displeasure at Blight, booing and heckling him as he made his way down to the huddle. Although he made light of this to his assistant coach and soon-to-be successor Gary Ayres by remarking "I told you, the Geelong people don't like you Hawthorn people", Blight was stung inwardly by the negative reception. Fortunately for the home side, star forward Gary Ablett kicked four of his seven goals as Geelong came from behind to win by three points. The Cats ended up making the Grand Final in 1994 for the third time under Blight, but after a difficult finals series, they were no match for West Coast, where Geelong fell short to West Coast by eighty points in the 1994 Grand Final and Blight confirmed his decision after the game to hand the coaching reins to assistant coach Gary Ayres, who replaced Blight as Geelong Football Club senior coach.

One of the strangest incidents as a coach of Geelong was his extroverted decision to stand on a metal box to watch the game against the West Coast Eagles in Perth. His excitement of "seeing the game at ground level", was an attempt to get back to basics and some nostalgia.

Blight coached Geelong Football Club from 1989 to 1994 to a total of 145 games with 89 wins and 56 losses with a winning percentage of 61 percent.

=== Adelaide Football Club senior coach (1997–1999) : Premiership success ===
Blight's then made his arrival at the Crows at the end of the 1996 season, when he replaced Robert Shaw as senior coach of Adelaide Football Club. This was marked with dramatic effect, with the delisting of four ageing club stalwarts Tony McGuinness, Chris McDermott, Andrew Jarman and Greg Anderson. This attracted great criticism at the time, but Blight was vindicated, when Adelaide Football Club under Blight won the AFL premiership in 1997, and again in 1998 for the second consecutive year. Blight resigned as Adelaide Football Club senior coach at the end of the 1999 season after an unsuccessful year finishing 13th. In 74 games under Blight, Adelaide won 41 games and 33 losses bringing a winning percentage to 55 percent. But he will always be remembered for his finals record with seven wins from eight games for two premierships To commemorate his legacy as Adelaide's first premiership coach, the club named their annual best and fairest award the Malcolm Blight Medal. Blight was once again replaced by Gary Ayres, this time as Adelaide Football Club senior coach.

=== St Kilda Football Club senior coach (2001): Promising start, disappointing end ===
After finishing at Adelaide, Blight decided to retire from football and moved to Queensland. St Kilda officials visited him there during 2000 and overcame his reluctance to coach St Kilda in 2001 with a $1 million offer. Blight then replaced Tim Watson as the St Kilda Football Club senior coach. Blight was however sacked after Round 15 during the 2001 season with three wins and twelve losses sitting at fourteenth (third-last) on the ladder. Blight was then replaced by Grant Thomas as caretaker senior coach for the rest of the 2001 season, who was eventually appointed as full-time senior coach. Blight's famous humiliation of the players by making them stay on Colonial Stadium after a Round 10 loss to Melbourne and again after a Round 15 loss to Adelaide in his final game as coach, highlighted the worsening relation between the coach, players and club supporters. Some years later the former president of St Kilda, Rod Butterss, questioned Blight's commitment to the club during his tenure. Blight responded memorably from his position as media commentator with Channel Ten, saying:

I couldn't give a rat's tossbag whether he thought I could coach or whether anyone thinks I can coach or can play. But when he talked about commitment for St Kilda, for the time I was there, it was absolute garbage made by a very naive person.

— Malcolm Blight, Out of left-field, Blight's passion burns furiously

However, as early as February 2003, Butterss had admitted that his appointment of Blight as coach was "an error." In August 2017, Butterss further admitted that he'd made crucial decisions (including the Blight saga) while under the influence of drugs and alcohol during his tenure at the club.

=== Involvement at Gold Coast Suns ===
In 2009, Blight joined the Board of directors at the 17th AFL team, Gold Coast Suns.

In July 2012, Gold Coast Suns announced that Blight had stepped down from the board to take up a part-time advisory role as director of coaching under Gold Coast Suns senior coach Guy McKenna, following a similar growing trend where former coaches (among them Mark Williams, Dean Laidley and Mark Harvey) have been employed as advisors to other senior coaches. Blight left the Gold Coast Suns at the end of the 2015 season, after he was relieved of his duties as director of coaching position at Gold Coast. Blight and the club came to a mutual agreement that the position had become redundant after the appointment of Rodney Eade as senior coach of the Gold Coast Suns at the start of the year and season.

=== Blight's Squad of Champions ===
Looking back over his coaching career, Blight revealed in June 2012 a team of the greatest 22 players that he had coached, plus four emergencies. This was how the team looked:

Malcolm Blight's Squad of Champions
B:	Ben Hart (Adelaide)	David Dench (North Melbourne)	Mark Bickley (Adelaide)
HB:	Andrew McLeod (Adelaide)	Ross Glendinning (North Melbourne)	Nigel Smart (Adelaide)
C:	Keith Greig (North Melbourne)	Paul Couch (Geelong)	Mark Bairstow (Geelong)
HF:	Wayne Schimmelbusch (North Melbourne)	Barry Stoneham (Geelong)	Ralph Sewer (Woodville)
F:	Darren Jarman (Adelaide)	Gary Ablett Sr. (Geelong)	Robert Harvey (St Kilda)
Foll:	Shaun Rehn (Adelaide)	Mark Ricciuto (Adelaide)	Garry Hocking (Geelong)
Int:	Ken Hinkley (Geelong)	David Pittman (Adelaide)	Simon Goodwin (Adelaide)
Int:	Tyson Edwards (Adelaide)		
Coach:	Malcolm Blight		

The four emergencies named were: Peter Caven (Adelaide), Kane Johnson (Adelaide), Peter Riccardi (Geelong) and Tony Modra (Adelaide).

== Media career ==
Blight continued his football involvement through the media. He commentated for the Seven Network during his hiatus from coaching in 1988, 1995–1996 and 2000, and also co-hosted Talking Footy with fellow commentator Bruce McAvaney and journalist Mike Sheahan. He was one of the commentators at Waverley Park during the famous "Lights Out Incident" during a night match between Essendon and St Kilda in 1996. After finishing up as a coach, Blight commentated for Network Ten's television coverage.

In 2006, Blight appeared in a Toyota Legendary Moment ad recreating his goal after the siren against Carlton.

He also wrote football-related articles for the Sunday Mail.

Blight is known for his dislike of the practice of players using grubber kicks when attempting to score a goal, due to the lack of control and unpredictability of the bounce. With David Wildy, he is currently the co-host of Sportsday SA on FIVEaa in Adelaide.

== Statistics ==
=== Playing statistics ===
Legend
G	Goals	K	Kicks	D	Disposals	T	Tackles
B	Behinds	H	Handballs	M	Marks

Led the league after season and finals

Season	Team	No.	Games	Totals							Averages (per game)						
Season	Team	No.	Games	G	B	K	H	D	M	T	G	B	K	H	D	M	T
1974	North Melbourne	15	15	17	18	200	60	260	91	—N/a	1.1	1.2	13.3	4.0	17.3	6.1	—N/a
1975†	North Melbourne	15	18	14	18	187	63	250	69	—N/a	0.8	1.1	11.0	3.7	14.7	4.1	—N/a
1976	North Melbourne	15	23	35	29	378	102	480	159	—N/a	1.5	1.3	16.4	4.4	20.9	6.9	—N/a
1977†	North Melbourne	15	24	24	33	415	115	530	127	—N/a	1.0	1.4	17.3	4.8	22.1	5.3	—N/a
1978	North Melbourne	15	24	77	51	361	69	430	136	—N/a	3.2	2.1	15.0	2.9	17.9	5.7	—N/a
1979	North Melbourne	15	19	60	27	275	67	342	102	—N/a	3.2	1.4	14.5	3.5	18.0	5.4	—N/a
1980	North Melbourne	15	20	44	29	282	90	372	87	—N/a	2.2	1.5	14.1	4.5	18.6	4.4	—N/a
1981	North Melbourne	15	15	70	45	206	31	237	79	—N/a	4.7	3.0	13.7	2.1	15.8	5.3	—N/a
1982	North Melbourne	15	20	103	66	233	43	276	112	—N/a	5.2	3.3	11.7	2.2	13.8	5.6	—N/a
Career			178	444	316	2537	640	3177	962	—N/a	2.5	1.8	14.3	3.6	17.8	5.4	—N/a

== Head coaching record ==
Team	Year	Home and Away Season					Finals			
Team	Year	Won	Lost	Drew	Win %	Position	Won	Lost	Win %	Result
NTH	1981	6	10	0	.375	8th out of 12	—	—	—	—
NTH Total		6	10	0	.375		0	0	.000	
GEE	1989	16	6	0	.727	3rd out of 14	2	2	.500	Lost to Hawthorn in Grand Final
GEE	1990	8	14	0	.364	10th out of 14	—	—	—	—
GEE	1991	16	6	0	.727	3rd out of 15	1	2	.333	Lost to West Coast in Preliminary Final
GEE	1992	16	6	0	.727	1st out of 15	2	2	.500	Lost to West Coast in Grand Final
GEE	1993	12	8	0	.600	7th out of 15	—	—	—	—
GEE	1994	13	9	0	.591	4th out of 15	3	1	.750	Lost to West Coast in Grand Final
GEE Total		81	49	0	.623		8	7	.533	
ADE	1997	13	9	0	.591	4th out of 16	4	0	1.000	Defeated St Kilda in Grand Final
ADE	1998	13	9	0	.591	5th out of 16	3	1	.750	Defeated North Melbourne in Grand Final
ADE	1999	8	14	0	.364	13th out of 16	—	—	—	—
ADE Total		34	32	0	.515		7	1	.875	
STK	2001	3	12	0	.200	(resigned after R15)	—	—	—	—
STK Total		3	12	0	.200		0	0	.000	
Total		124	103	0	.546		15	8	.652	

== See also ==
- After the siren kicks in Australian rules football
- Robert Walls
