= 1989 Geelong Football Club season =

Geelong Football Club
1989 season
- President: Ron Hovey
- Coach: Malcolm Blight (1st season)
- Captains: Damian Bourke (3rd season)
- Home ground: Kardinia Park
- Panasonic Cup: 2nd
- VFL season: 3rd
- 1989 VFL finals series: Runner-up
- Best and Fairest: Paul Couch
- Leading goalkicker: Gary Ablett (89)
- Club membership: TBA

The 1989 Geelong Football Club season was the club's 118th season of senior competition in the Victorian Football League (VFL). The club entered the 1989 season proper after falling 9 points short of Melbourne in the 1989 Panasonic Cup, the league's pre-season grand final. Under new coach Malcolm Blight, the Cats played attractive attacking football, scoring a combined total of 2916 points during the home-and-away season to break Sydney's record set in 1987 (2846 points). The Cats made it to their first Grand Final since 1967, but they ultimately fell six points short to Hawthorn in one of the all-time classic Grand Finals.

== Season summary ==
=== Regular season ===
Geelong's 1989 VFL season fixture
Round	Date and local time	Opponent	Home	Away	Result	Venue	Attendance	Ladder position
Round	Date and local time	Opponent	Scores^{[a]}			Venue	Attendance	Ladder position
1	Sunday, 2 April (2:10 pm)	North Melbourne	18.17 (125)	17.21 (123)	Lost by 2 points	MCG [A]	24,383	8th
2	Sunday, 9 April (2:10 pm)	West Coast	26.19 (175)	11.14 (80)	Won by 95 points	Kardinia Park [H]	19,939	3rd
3	Sunday, 16 April (2:10 pm)	Carlton	16.21 (117)	9.10 (64)	Won by 53 points	Kardinia Park [H]	27,633	1st
4	Sunday, 23 April (2:10 pm)	Footscray	12.15 (87)	14.15 (99)	Won by 12 points	Western Oval [A]	22,844	2nd
5	Saturday, 29 April (2:10 pm)	Fitzroy	16.17 (113)	16.16 (112)	Lost by 1 point	Princes Park [A]	13,102	5th
6	Saturday, 6 May (2:10 pm)	Hawthorn	26.15 (171)	25.13 (163)	Lost by 8 points	Princes Park [A]	17,430	8th
7	Saturday, 13 May (2:10 pm)	St Kilda	35.18 (228)	16.13 (109)	Won by 119 points	Kardinia Park [H]	21,421	6th
8	Saturday, 20 May (2:10 pm)	Brisbane Bears	26.23 (179)	6.14 (50)	Won by 129 points	Kardinia Park [H]	17,265	5th
9	Saturday, 27 May (2:10 pm)	Richmond	10.17 (77)	32.19 (211)	Won by 134 points	MCG [A]	24,321	4th
10	Thursday, 25 May (7:20 pm)	Collingwood	13.10 (88)	23.16 (154)	Won by 66 points	MCG [A]	65,185	4th
11	Monday, 12 June (2:10 pm)	Essendon	12.17 (89)	4.11 (35)	Won by 54 points	MCG [H]	87,653	3rd
12	Saturday, 17 June (2:10 pm)	Melbourne	2.8 (20)	13.11 (89)	Won by 69 points	MCG [A]	38,128	2nd
13	Sunday, 25 June (2:10 pm)	Sydney	14.19 (103)	16.15 (111)	Won by 13 points	SCG [A]	12,967	2nd
14	Saturday, 8 July (2:10 pm)	Fitzroy	11.16 (82)	8.10 (58)	Won by 24 points	Kardinia Park [H]	18,407	2nd
15	Saturday, 15 July (7:40 pm)	Brisbane Bears	11.11 (77)	22.19 (151)	Won by 74 points	Carrara Oval [A]	18,198	2nd
16	Saturday, 22 July (2:10 pm)	Melbourne	17.7 (109)	16.16 (112)	Lost by 3 points	Waverley Park [H]	38,865	3rd
17	Saturday, 29 July (2:10 pm)	Collingwood	14.20 (104)	19.11 (125)	Lost by 21 points	MCG [H]	35,217	4th
18	Saturday, 5 August (2:10 pm)	St Kilda	13.12 (90)	17.11 (113)	Won by 23 points	Moorabbin Oval [A]	14,243	3rd
19	Saturday, 12 August (2:10 pm)	Footscray	18.16 (124)	10.14 (74)	Won by 50 points	Kardinia Park [H]	17,046	3rd
20	Friday, 18 August (7:40 pm)	West Coast	18.18 (126)	12.10 (82)	Lost by 44 points	WACA Ground [A]	15,721	3rd
21	Saturday, 26 August (2:10 pm)	North Melbourne	20.19 (139)	17.15 (117)	Won by 22 points	Kardinia Park [H]	18,025	3rd
22	Saturday, 2 September (2:10 pm)	Richmond	23.24 (162)	12.14 (86)	Won by 76 points	Kardinia Park [H]	20,788	3rd

=== Ladder ===
(P)	Premiers
	Qualified for finals

#	Team	P	W	L	D	PF	PA	%	Pts
1	Hawthorn (P)	22	19	3	0	2678	1748	153.2	76
2	Essendon	22	17	5	0	2240	1705	131.4	68
3	Geelong	22	16	6	0	2916	1987	146.8	64
4	Melbourne	22	14	8	0	1876	1944	96.5	56
5	Collingwood	22	13	9	0	2216	1964	112.8	52
6	Fitzroy	22	12	10	0	2069	2125	97.4	48
7	Sydney	22	11	11	0	1959	1958	100.1	44
8	Carlton	22	9	12	1	1921	2079	92.4	38
9	North Melbourne	22	9	13	0	2061	2301	89.6	36
10	Brisbane Bears	22	8	14	0	1792	2274	78.8	32
11	West Coast	22	7	15	0	1948	2247	86.7	28
12	St Kilda	22	7	15	0	2108	2502	84.3	28
13	Footscray	22	6	15	1	1614	1855	87.0	26
14	Richmond	22	5	17	0	1725	2434	70.9	20

Rules for classification: 1. premiership points; 2. percentage; 3. points for
Average score: 94.6
Source: AFL Tables

== Honours ==
=== Milestones ===
- Round 6 – Gary Ablett, snr (100 VFL games)

=== Others ===
- Paul Couch won the Brownlow Medal

== Notes ==
Key

- H Home match.
- A Away match.

Notes

- **^{a}** Geelong's scores are indicated in **bold** font.
