= Chad Rintoul =

Australian rules footballer

Personal information
- Born: 31 July 1974 (age 52)
- Original team: East Fremantle (WAFL)
- Draft: No. 69, 1996 National Draft
- Debut: Round 1, 30 March 1997, Adelaide vs. Brisbane, at Football Park

Playing career^{1}
Years	Club	Games (Goals)
1997–1998	Adelaide	23 (16)
1999–2000	West Coast Eagles	39 (10)
2001–2002	Collingwood	14 (5)
Total		76 (31)
- ^{1} Playing statistics correct to the end of 2002.

Career highlights
- AFL Premiership player (1997)

Chad Rintoul (born 31 July 1974) is a former Australian rules footballer in the Australian Football League.

== Adelaide Crows ==
The midfielder was drafted by the Adelaide Crows in the 1996 AFL draft from East Fremantle (WAFL) as a mature age recruit. He played 23 games for the Crows, 11 in 1997 including the premiership game, playing as a small forward for most of the year. In 1998 he played 12 games and although he played in the preliminary final, he was dropped the following week so that the Crows could bring in another ruckman and missed out on a second premiership medal. At the end of 1998 he was traded back to Western Australia by the West Coast Eagles for pick 80 which Adelaide used on 26-year-old Brodie Atkinson.

== West Coast Eagles ==
During his first season with the Eagles he played all 24 games including a 36 possession game vs Adelaide. Rintoul couldn't find consistency in 2000 and coach Ken Judge sent Rinoul back to East Fremantle which resulted in him getting delisted.

== Collingwood ==
Rintoul went to Collingwood in the 2001 pre season draft where he was reunited with his former coach Mick Malthouse. Chad was plagued with migraines in 2002 after many concussions and was forced to retire.

== Statistics ==
Legend
G	Goals	K	Kicks	D	Disposals	T	Tackles
B	Behinds	H	Handballs	M	Marks

Season	Team	No.	Games	Totals							Averages (per game)						
Season	Team	No.	Games	G	B	K	H	D	M	T	G	B	K	H	D	M	T
1997†	Adelaide	42	11	8	11	89	27	116	39	9	0.7	1.0	8.1	2.5	10.5	3.5	0.8
1998	Adelaide	42	12	8	5	99	45	144	37	12	0.7	0.4	8.3	3.8	12.0	3.1	1.0
1999	West Coast	42	24	6	14	216	133	349	77	23	0.3	0.6	9.0	5.5	14.5	3.2	1.0
2000	West Coast	42	15	4	3	136	84	220	54	16	0.3	0.2	9.1	5.6	14.7	3.6	1.1
2001	Collingwood	38	11	4	2	94	46	140	46	11	0.4	0.2	8.5	4.2	12.7	4.2	1.0
2002	Collingwood	21	3	1	2	35	12	47	14	5	0.3	0.7	11.7	4.0	15.7	4.7	1.7
Career			76	31	37	669	347	1016	267	76	0.4	0.5	8.8	4.6	13.4	3.5	1.0
