= Paul Rouvray =

Australian rules footballer

Personal information
- Full name: Paul Justin Rouvray
- Born: 18 April 1972 (age 54)
- Original team: Glenelg
- Draft: 25th, 1989 VFL draft Melbourne
- Height: 189 cm (6 ft 2 in)
- Weight: 93 kg (205 lb)

Playing career^{1}
Years	Club	Games (Goals)
1992–1994	Adelaide	21 (2)
- ^{1} Playing statistics correct to the end of 1994.

Paul Rouvray (born 18 April 1972) is a former Australian rules footballer who played with Adelaide in the Australian Football League (AFL).

Although originally drafted by Melbourne, it was at Adelaide that Rouvray played his first AFL game. An original squad member from 1991, Rouvray didn't break into the team until round 19 of the 1992 season. He was the full-back in the 1992 SANFL Grand Final for Glenelg and finished on the losing side.

Rouvray, who was also used as a wingman, made nine AFL appearances in 1993 and another 11 in 1994. He was then traded to the Sydney Swans, in a swap with Peter Caven but never earned a call up to the seniors. He finished his career at Glenelg in 1999, having played 113 games.
