= 2004 Wizard Home Loans Cup =

Australian football league competition

- Season: 2004
- Teams: 16
- Winners: St Kilda (2nd title)
- Matches played: 15
- Attendance: 259,762 (average 17,317 per match)
- Michael Tuck Medallist: Robert Harvey (St Kilda)

The 2004 Wizard Home Loans Cup was the Australian Football League competition played in its entirety before the Australian Football League's 2004 Premiership Season began. The AFL National Cup is also sometimes referred to as the pre-season cup because it is played in its entirety before the Premiership Season begins.

== Games ==
=== Round 1 ===
Home team	Home team score	Away team	Away team score	Ground	Crowd	Date
Essendon	2.13.11 (107)	Fremantle	1.13.12 (99)	Marrara Oval	13,196	Friday, 20 February, 7:10 PM
Western Bulldogs	0.12.9 (81)	Richmond	2.13.9 (105)	Telstra Dome	22,537	Friday, 20 February, 7:40 PM
Kangaroos	2.10.13 (91)	Melbourne	4.11.11 (113)	Manuka Oval	3,227	Saturday, 21 February, 1:10 PM
West Coast	1.18.14 (131)	Collingwood	0.2.14 (26)	Subiaco Oval	24,101	Saturday, 21 February, 5:40 PM
Port Adelaide	1.8.5 (65)	Geelong	2.10.7 (85)	Bundaberg Rum Stadium	7,645	Saturday, 21 February, 7:10 PM
Hawthorn	0.4.16 (40)	Brisbane Lions	0.12.5 (77)	York Park	12,443	Sunday, 22 February, 1:10 PM
Sydney	2.4.6 (48)	Carlton	1.22.9 (150)	Telstra Stadium	6,190	Sunday, 22 February, 3:45 PM
Adelaide	1.11.5 (80)	St Kilda	1.12.12 (93)	AAMI Stadium	13,905	Sunday, 22 February, 4:40 PM

=== Quarter-finals ===
Home team	Home team score	Away team	Away team score	Ground	Crowd	Date
West Coast	0.11.9 (75)	Melbourne	1.11.12 (87)	Telstra Dome	8,753	Friday, 27 February, 7:40 PM
Carlton	1.9.3 (66)	Geelong	0.13.8 (86)	Optus Oval	11,862	Saturday, 28 February, 2:10 PM
Essendon	1.12.9 (90)	Brisbane Lions	2.8.13 (79)	Telstra Dome	19,120	Saturday, 28 February, 7:40 PM
St Kilda	2.15.11. (119)	Richmond	1.7.6 (57)	Telstra Dome	18,177	Sunday, 29 February, 5:10 PM

=== Semi-finals ===
Home team	Home team score	Away team	Away team score	Ground	Crowd	Date
Melbourne	2.8.10 (76)	Geelong	2.8.11 (77)	Telstra Dome	18,537	Friday, 5 March, 7:40 PM
Essendon	1.11.9 (84)	St Kilda	2.16.12 (126)	Telstra Dome	29,536	Saturday, 6 March, 7:40 PM

=== Grand Final ===
Home team	Home team score	Away team	Away team score	Ground	Crowd	Date
Geelong	1.10.7 (76)	St Kilda	1.14.5 (98)	Telstra Dome	50,533	Saturday, 13 March, 7:30 PM

== Scorecard ==
St Kilda vs Geelong
Team	Q1	Q2	Q3	Final
St Kilda	0.4.1 (25)	0.7.3 (45)	0.10.4 (64)	1.14.5 (98)
Geelong	0.2.1 (13)	1.7.5 (56)	1.10.6 (75)	1.10.7 (76)
Venue:		Telstra Dome, Melbourne		
Date:		13 March 2004 – 7:30PM AEDT		
Attendance:		50,533		
Umpires:		Michael Vozzo, Scott McLaren, Corin Rowe, Shane McInerney		
Goal scorers:	St Kilda	Goals: 4: Guerra; 2: Hamill, Gehrig, Riewoldt; 1: Jones, Hayes, Ball, Milne, Montagna		
Goal scorers:	Geelong	Goals: 5: Kingsley; 2: Graham, McCarthy; 1: Haynes, Ablett		
Best:	St Kilda	Harvey, Hayes, Guerra, Dal Santo, Voss, Ball		
Best:	Geelong	Enright, Kingsley, Milburn, Rahilly, Scarlett, Mooney		
Reports:		nil		
Injuries:		nil		
Coin toss winner:		St Kilda		
Michael Tuck Medal:		Robert Harvey		
Australian television broadcaster:		Network Ten		
National Anthem:		Jordan Doroschuk		

== Grand Final teams ==
=== St Kilda Football Club ===
Team
B:	Brett Voss	Luke Penny	Troy Schwarze
HB:	Steven Baker	Matt Maguire	Austinn Jones
C:	Heath Black	Lenny Hayes	Nick Dal Santo
HF:	Aaron Hamill	Nick Riewoldt	Xavier Clarke
F:	Stephen Milne	Fraser Gehrig	Brent Guerra
Foll:	Trent Knobel	Stephen Powell	Luke Ball
Int:	Andrew Thompson	Brendon Goddard	Justin Koschitzke
Int:	Jason Blake	Leigh Montagna	Robert Harvey
Coach:	Grant Thomas		

=== Geelong Football Club ===
Team
B:	James Rahilly	Matthew Scarlett	Darren Milburn
HB:	Tom Harley	Cameron Mooney	Brenton Sanderson
C:	Jimmy Bartel	Corey Enright	David Spriggs
HF:	Gary Ablett Jnr	Ben Graham	James Kelly
F:	Henry Playfair	Kent Kingsley	David Haynes
Foll:	Paul Chambers	Cameron Ling	Peter Riccardi
Int:	Kane Tenace	Joel Corey	Matthew McCarthy
Int:	Max Rooke	Paul Chapman	Josh Hunt
Coach:	Mark Thompson		

== Wizard Regional Challenge Series ==
	Practice Match
Saturday, 14 February (3:30pm)	Sydney 10.9 (69)	def. by	Essendon 12.8 (80)	North Sydney Oval (crowd: 6,204)
Match was played with 15 players per side.

	Week 1
Friday, 27 February (7:30pm)	Port Adelaide 15.14 (104)	def.	Western Bulldogs 13.8 (86)	AAMI Stadium (crowd: 6,851)
Saturday, 28 February (2:00pm)	Collingwood 6.11 (47)	def. by	Sydney 12.8 (80)	Victoria Park (crowd: 5,500 est.)
Saturday, 28 February (2:00pm)	Hawthorn 11.13 (79)	drew with	Kangaroos 11.13 (79)	Morwell Recreation Reserve, Morwell (crowd: 1,500 est.)
Saturday, 28 February (12:30pm)	Fremantle 12.4 (76)	def.	Adelaide 6.9 (45)	Subiaco Oval (crowd: 7,327)

	Week 2
Friday, 5 March (4:00pm)	Kangaroos 13.16 (94)	def.	Sydney 11.5 (71)	Optus Oval (crowd: 2,000 est.)
Friday, 5 March (7:30pm)	Adelaide 17.16 (118)	def.	West Coast 4.6 (30)	AAMI Stadium (crowd: 8,817)
Friday, 5 March (7:30pm)	Collingwood 14.7 (91)	def. by	Port Adelaide 15.15 (105)	Traeger Park (crowd: 10,000 est.)
Saturday, 6 March (2:00pm)	Carlton 17.15 (117)	def. by	Western Bulldogs 20.13 (133)	Deakin Reserve, Shepparton (crowd: 4,000 est.)
Saturday, 6 March (2:00pm)	Hawthorn 15.4 (94)	def. by	Fremantle 18.12 (120)	Optus Oval (crowd: 2,500 est.)
Saturday, 6 March (7:00pm)	Brisbane Lions 13.9 (87)	def.	Richmond 11.12 (78)	Giffin Park, Coorparoo (crowd: 5,000 est.)

	Week 3
Friday, 12 March (4:00pm)	Carlton 19.17 (121)	def.	Richmond 14.12 (96)	Optus Oval (crowd: 4,000 est.)
Friday, 12 March (4:00pm)	Collingwood 7.8 (50)	def. by	Melbourne 9.12 (66)	Victoria Park (crowd: 5,000 est.)
Friday, 12 March (3:00pm)	West Coast 14.15 (99)	def.	Hawthorn 9.10 (64)	Subiaco Oval (crowd: 3,345)
Saturday, 13 March (1:30pm)	Sydney 17.14 (116)	def.	Essendon 9.10 (64)	Newcastle Number 1 Sports Ground (crowd: 3,405)
Saturday, 13 March (2:00pm)	Western Bulldogs 15.13 (103)	def. by	Brisbane Lions 16.12 (108)	Optus Oval (crowd: 4,000 est.)
Saturday, 13 March (2:00pm)	Port Adelaide 10.5 (65)	def. by	Adelaide 9.18 (72)	Kadina Oval, Kadina, South Australia (crowd: 8,905)
Saturday, 13 March (3:30pm)	Fremantle 15.8 (98)	def. by	Kangaroos 18.12 (120)	Rushton Park, Mandurah (crowd: 7,527)

== See also ==
- List of Australian Football League night premiers
- 2004 AFL season
