= Brent Guerra =

Australian rules footballer, born 1982

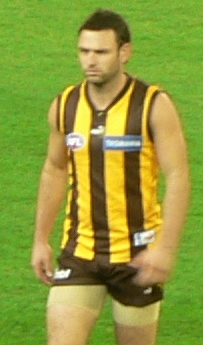
- Guerra playing for Hawthorn during the 2007 AFL season

Personal information
- Full name: Brent Guerra
- Born: 29 May 1982 (age 44); Koondrook, Victoria
- Original teams: Bendigo Pioneers (TAC Cup), Koondrook-Barham
- Draft: No. 28, 1999 national draft
- Debut: Round 16, 2000, Port Adelaide vs. Kangaroos, at Sydney Cricket Ground
- Height: 182 cm (6 ft 0 in)
- Weight: 90 kg (198 lb)
- Position: Forward and defender

Playing career^{1}
Years	Club	Games (Goals)
2000–2003	Port Adelaide	65 (39)
2004–2005	St Kilda	31 (44)
2006–2013	Hawthorn	159 (25)
Total		255 (108)
- ^{1} Playing statistics correct to the end of 2013.

Career highlights
- 2× AFL premiership player: 2008, 2013; Pre-season premiership player: 2004; 3x SANFL premiership player: 2000, 2001, 2003

Brent Guerra (born 29 May 1982) is a former Australian rules football player who played with the Port Adelaide Football Club, St Kilda Football Club, and Hawthorn Football Club in the Australian Football League.

== Career ==
=== Port Adelaide ===
Beginning his career at Port Adelaide in 2000, he was seen as a potentially dangerous winger or forward. Brent Guerra also won three SANFL Premierships with Central District. However, at the end of 2003 he was traded from the club due to Guerra wanting to return to Victoria and the Saints picked him up for pick 39, who was the unsuccessful Robert Forster-Knight.

=== St Kilda ===
Guerra was a key figure for a period during the Saints' early season run in 2004, when St Kilda won the 2004 Wizard Home Loans Cup and the first 10 games of the home and away season. He kicked 20 goals in six games, including seven in one game. From then, however, his form tapered and he finished with only nine more goals from the remaining 12 games. He was noted for a number of incidents when he shirtfronted players, including once before the opening bounce of a game (for which he was suspended).

In 2005, Guerra had another average year and, at the end of the season, the Saints delisted him.

=== Hawthorn ===
The Hawthorn Football Club selected Guerra with pick three in the 2005 AFL Pre-season draft. Guerra had a connection with Hawks' coach Alastair Clarkson from Clarkson's time as a premiership coach at Central Districts (2001) and assistant coach at Port Adelaide. Guerra was reinvented at Hawthorn as a strong-bodied half back flanker and added experience to a very young Hawks' lineup in 2006. His hard-nosed approach has at times attracted the attention of umpires. In 2007 and 2008 he averaged in excess of 20 possessions per game, displaying a consistency which was lacking earlier in his career up forward.

As a part of Hawthorn's 2008 premiership side, Guerra had 25 possessions in a reliable display.

In Round 23, 2012, a week before the finals with Hawthorn sitting on top of the ladder, Guerra sustained a hamstring injury. It occurred in the final quarter of Hawthorn's 25-point victory over West Coast. On 24 September, Guerra ruled himself out of the 2012 Grand Final against the Sydney Swans.

Guerra was part of 2013 AFL season Goal Of The Year winner in Round 3 against Collingwood at the M.C.G. by Lance Franklin after kicking a 70 metre long torpedo from a kick in. The ball was marked by Ben Stratton just before the centre circle, where Stratton turned to play on. As he was tackled he handballed to Franklin, who had to hurdle over the two falling players before launching a kick from 10 metres inside the centre square. The ball landed in the goal square and bounced straight through, taking a total of 12 seconds from start to finish to travel the 180 metre distance.

On 2 October 2013, the week following his second premiership with the Hawthorn Football Club, Guerra officially announced his retirement from AFL football to pursue a career in coaching.

Through Guerra's career he suffered from a recurring hamstring injury which kept him from playing in the 2012 Grand Final.

Guerra played for Deer Park in the Western Region Football League, from October 2013 till November 2013. He won a premiership with Deer Park in October 2014.

Guerra also made a guest stint in three games for Devonport in the Tasmanian Football League in 2014.

He returned to his junior club, Koondrook-Barham in southern NSW, in 2014 to play one game at the club.

== Coaching career ==
In his final year as a player, Guerra completed a Level 2 coaching accreditation course and a diploma of management. Shortly after retiring from playing, Guerra was appointed a part-time development coach at the Hawks in November 2013.

On 19 September 2014, Guerra joined Chelsea in the Mornington Peninsula Nepean Football League as player-coach. Prior to the 2016 season, he was appointed as a development coach with Fremantle. He departed from his role as development coach at the end of the 2019 season, after not being offered a new contract.

== Off field ==
Guerra experienced male pattern balding at a young age and made headlines in late 2005 when he underwent a hair transplant cosmetic surgery procedure. He has said that the operation gave him confidence both on and off the field.

Guerra has a brother, Luke, who currently plays with Deer Park in the Western Region Football League.

Since retirement Guerra has revealed that he struggled with a gambling addiction whilst he was a professional footballer, a habit which cost him $400,000.

== Statistics ==
Legend
G	Goals	K	Kicks	D	Disposals	T	Tackles
B	Behinds	H	Handballs	M	Marks

Season	Team	No.	Games	Totals							Averages (per game)							Votes
Season	Team	No.	Games	G	B	K	H	D	M	T	G	B	K	H	D	M	T	Votes
2000	Port Adelaide	34	10	4	4	57	17	74	17	10	0.4	0.4	5.7	1.7	7.4	1.7	1.0	0
2001	Port Adelaide	34	21	13	4	136	40	176	55	21	0.6	0.2	6.5	1.9	8.4	2.6	1.0	0
2002`	Port Adelaide	34	20	16	10	137	46	183	51	44	0.8	0.5	6.9	2.3	9.2	2.6	2.2	0
2003`	Port Adelaide	34	14	6	5	75	37	112	28	21	0.4	0.4	5.4	2.6	8.0	2.0	1.5	0
2004^	St Kilda	34	18	29	5	96	23	119	29	59	1.6	0.3	5.3	1.3	6.6	1.6	3.3	1
2005	St Kilda	34	13	15	10	72	31	103	33	41	1.2	0.8	5.5	2.4	7.9	2.5	3.2	2
2006	Hawthorn	18	15	3	2	184	91	275	84	27	0.2	0.1	12.3	6.1	18.3	5.6	1.8	0
2007	Hawthorn	18	24	3	4	307	174	481	130	51	0.1	0.2	12.8	7.3	20.0	5.4	2.1	0
2008^{#}	Hawthorn	18	21	0	4	276	158	434	142	35	0.0	0.2	13.1	7.5	20.7	6.8	1.7	0
2009	Hawthorn	18	16	5	2	172	137	309	68	40	0.3	0.1	10.8	8.6	19.3	4.3	2.5	1
2010	Hawthorn	18	23	1	6	271	160	431	93	63	0.0	0.3	11.8	7.0	18.7	4.0	2.7	1
2011	Hawthorn	18	22	8	4	260	129	389	132	70	0.4	0.2	11.8	5.9	17.7	6.0	3.2	0
2012`	Hawthorn	18	19	2	5	244	106	350	104	51	0.1	0.3	12.8	5.6	18.4	5.5	2.7	1
2013`^{#}	Hawthorn	18	19	3	3	228	126	354	93	43	0.2	0.2	12.0	6.6	18.6	4.9	2.3	0
Career			255	108	68	2515	1275	3790	1059	576	0.4	0.3	9.9	5.0	14.9	4.2	2.3	6

== Honours and achievements ==
Team

- 2× AFL premiership player (Hawthorn): 2008, 2013
- 2× Minor premiership (Port Adelaide): 2002, 2003
- 2× Minor premiership (Hawthorn): 2012, 2013
- Pre-season premiership player (St Kilda): 2004
- 3x SANFL premiership player (Central District Bulldogs): 2000, 2001, 2003

Individual

- AFL Rising Star nominee: 2001
- Hawthorn life member
