= Stephen Powell =

Australian rules footballer, born 1976

Personal information
- Born: 7 September 1976 (age 50)
- Original team: St Kevins / Central U18
- Debut: Round 6, 2 May 1997, Western Bulldogs vs. West Coast Eagles, at WACA

Playing career^{1}
Years	Club	Games (Goals)
1997–1999	Western Bulldogs	30 (21)
2000–2002	Melbourne	44 (43)
2003–2006	St Kilda	68 (30)
Total		142 (94)
- ^{1} Playing statistics correct to the end of 2006.

Career highlights
- St Kilda Wizard Cup winning side 2004

Stephen Powell (born 7 September 1976) is a former Australian rules footballer in the Australian Football League (AFL).

== Early Life ==
Powell was born in Melbourne, Australia. As a child, his family moved to Adelaide and Sydney, before returning to Melbourne when he was 12. Growing up, Powell was a fan of the Collingwood Football Club.

== Career as a Football Player ==
Powell made his debut with the Western Bulldogs as a 20-year-old in 1997. He quickly became known as a player whose hardness and aggression at the ball was invaluable, continuing this role as the Bulldogs reached preliminary finals in 1997 and 1998. Surprisingly, at the end of 1999 he was traded to the Melbourne Football Club, contributing to Melbourne's 2000 season, which culminated in losing the 2000 Grand Final against Essendon Football Club.

Powell polled strongly in their Best and Fairest at the end of the year. He missed all of 2001 with a near career ending groin injury. 2002 saw him return to play. At the end of the season, contract negotiations saw him opt to leave the club through the pre-season draft, this time to the St Kilda Football Club. He was a player in a midfield that included players such as Lenny Hayes, Robert Harvey and Nick Dal Santo. For the 2003 season, he received third place in voting for the Trevor Barker Award.

Powell played in St Kilda's 2004 Wizard Home Loans Cup winning side.

In 2005, however, Powell's career hit a hurdle. Returning from injury in Round 9 he never quite reached the level of consistency of 2003, and lack of pace became an issue, although he was a regular first team member. At the end of the year there were doubts about the future of the just-turned-29, Powell, but he later signed a one-year contract. A sharp downturn in speed and form limited Powell's chances.

2006 was Powell's last season of football, playing only 10 matches and announcing his retirement, in September, a week after St Kilda's exit from the 2006 AFL Finals Series.

== Personal Life ==
Powell has been married since at least 2004. While playing football, Powell worked one day a week and was in the process of obtaining a Master of Commerce degree. Following his retirement from football, he worked for a bank specializing in the bond market.
