= Max Hudghton =

Australian rules footballer, born 1976

Personal information
- Full name: Max Kenneth Hudghton
- Born: 2 September 1976 (age 50)
- Original team: Diamond Creek/Northern U18/West Brisbane
- Debut: Round 1, 1997, St Kilda vs. Hawthorn, at Waverley Park
- Height: 191 cm (6 ft 3 in)
- Weight: 93 kg (205 lb)

Playing career^{1}
Years	Club	Games (Goals)
1997–2009	St Kilda	234 (14)
- ^{1} Playing statistics correct to the end of 2009.

Career highlights
- St Kilda Minor Premiership Side 2009; St Kilda Minor Premiership Side 1997; International Rules Series 2004

Max Kenneth Hudghton (born 2 September 1976 in Victoria, Australia) is a former Australian rules footballer in the Australian Football League.

Selected at pick 15 in the 1996 AFL draft, Hudghton was a debutant who made his name in the St Kilda Football Club's 1997 season.

Hudghton played in 14 of 22 matches in the 1997 AFL Premiership Season home and away rounds in which St Kilda Football Club qualified in first position for the 1997 AFL Finals Series, winning the club's 2nd Minor Premiership and 1st McClelland Trophy.

Hudghton was a versatile and tall defender who played on forwards of nearly any size. His defensive skills were an important part of the St Kilda team over his career.

Of the regular fullbacks in 2006, Hudghton conceded fewest goals. While his disposals average of 10 was below average for a defender, Hudghton's disposal efficiency of 90% was elite. With only 32 marks from opposition kicks in the past two years, he prefers to spoil and in 2006 he effected the fourth highest number of spoils in the league.

In 2008, Hudghton shut down key players such as Matthew Lloyd, Warren Tredrea, Russell Robertson, Brendan Fevola, Barry Hall and Lance Franklin in the home and away season. Hudghton held Franklin and Fevola to nine goals through four games (2.25 goals per game); a remarkable achievement given their combined 201 goal haul at 4.57 goals per game. He was included in the 2008 All Australian squad of 40.

Hudghton played in 7 of 22 matches in the 2009 AFL Premiership Season home and away rounds in which St Kilda qualified in first position for the 2009 AFL Finals Series, winning the club's 3rd Minor Premiership.

On 27 September 2009, the day after St Kilda lost to Geelong in the grand final, Hudghton announced his retirement on the stage of Etihad Stadium in front of several thousand supporters at a family day. Hudghton played seven senior games in the 2009 season and was not selected for the grand final. He played 234 AFL games in 13 AFL seasons, all for St Kilda.

On 12 October 2009, Hudghton was announced as an assistant coach at the Collingwood Football Club as a part-time defensive coach for the 2010 season.

Hudghton returned to St Kilda as an assistant coach for the 2012 season.

== Trivia ==
In 2001, Hudghton appeared on a special sports edition of The Weakest Link. He was voted off in Round 2.
