= Robert Harvey (footballer) =

Australian rules footballer (born 1971)

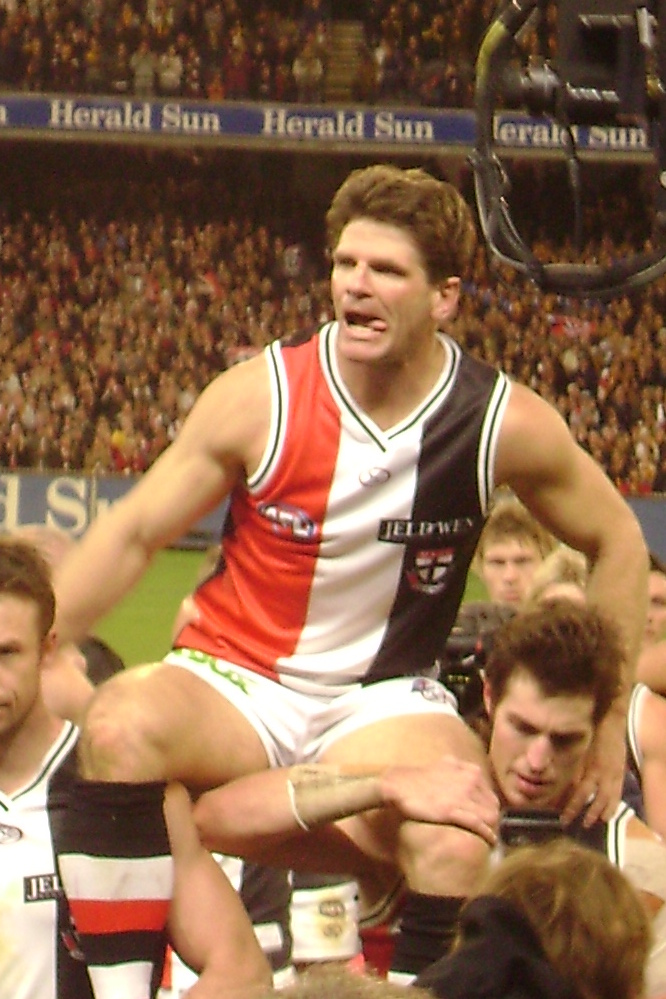
- Harvey in 2008

Personal information
- Full name: Robert Jeffrey Harvey
- Nickname: Banga
- Born: 21 August 1971 (age 55); Seaford, Victoria
- Original team: Seaford
- Height: 181 cm (5 ft 11 in)
- Weight: 84 kg (185 lb)
- Position: Midfielder

Playing career^{1}
Years	Club	Games (Goals)
1988–2008	St Kilda	383 (215)

Representative team honours
Years	Team	Games (Goals)
1991–1997	Victoria	8 (4)

Coaching career^{3}
Years	Club	Games (W–L–D)
2021	Collingwood	9 (2–7–0)
- ^{1} Playing statistics correct to the end of 2008.^{3} Coaching statistics correct as of the 2021 season.

Career highlights
- Playing: 2× Brownlow Medal: 1997, 1998; AFLPA MVP (Leigh Matthews Trophy): 1997; 8× All-Australian team: 1992, 1994–1999, 2003; 4× Trevor Barker Award: 1992, 1994, 1997, 1998; Herald Sun Player of the Year Award: 1997; Madden Medal: 2008; 3× Pre-Season premiership player: 1996, 2004, 2008; Michael Tuck Medal: 2004; St Kilda Team of the Century; 3× E. J. Whitten Medal; Lou Richards Medal: 2002; St Kilda Team of the Century; Coaching: AFLCA assistant coach of the year: 2013; Hall of Fame: Australian Football Hall of Fame inductee; St Kilda Hall of Fame inductee – Legend status

Robert Jeffrey Harvey (born 21 August 1971) is an Australian rules football coach and former player. He is currently an assistant coach for the St Kilda Football Club in the Australian Football League (AFL). As a player, he played his entire career with St Kilda in the AFL. Following retirement, Harvey embarked on a career in assistant coaching which has spanned across three decades, highlighted by a nine-game stint as caretaker head coach of the Collingwood Football Club in 2021.

Harvey was recognised as one of the top 50 players of all time in The Australian Game of Football, a book commissioned by the AFL in 2008 to celebrate the 150th anniversary of Australian rules football. The list was compiled by Herald Sun journalist Mike Sheahan. Harvey was known for his running ability and considered one of the best short passes of 15 to 30 metres in the history of the game. He holds St Kilda's record for most career games. At his retirement, at the end of the 2008 AFL season, Harvey had played the third-highest total career games in league history, with 383 games. Currently, he ranks seventh in games played; Harvey was also the final active player from the VFL era of the league (pre-1990) to retire.

Harvey won numerous individual awards and medals during his playing career. He won consecutive Brownlow Medals, the league's highest individual honour, in 1997 and 1998. He won St Kilda's best and fairest award—now called the Trevor Barker Award—in 1992, 1994, 1997 and 1998. He was selected in the All-Australian team eight times, with his first All-Australian award being in 1992 and his last in 2003. He won three E. J. Whitten Medals, awarded to the player judged best player on the ground for Victoria in State of Origin matches; the 1997 AFL Players Association Most Valuable Player Award (now known as the Leigh Matthews Trophy); and the Michael Tuck Medal for player judged best on ground in the 2004 pre-season cup final. In 2012, Harvey was inducted in the Australian Football Hall of Fame. On 24 September 2013, Harvey was named the AFL's Assistant Coach of the Year at the AFL Coaches Association awards presentation.

Harvey is the grandson of former Australian test cricketer Merv Harvey and grandnephew of Neil Harvey, who was Australia's leading run-scorer and century-maker behind Don Bradman. His younger brother, Anthony Harvey, played four games for St Kilda in 1994 before captaining Norwood to the 1997 SANFL premiership.

== Playing career ==
=== St Kilda ===
==== Early career: 1988–1993 ====
Harvey was recruited from St Kilda's then-VCFL zone Seaford and played his first senior game for St Kilda against Footscray at the Western Oval in round 19, 1988. Harvey played in the 1991 St Kilda team that qualified for the finals series for the first time since 1973. He was a vital player in St Kilda team that qualified for that year's final series and had the club's first finals' win since 1973. He won St Kilda's 1992 award for the best and fairest player (now called the Trevor Barker Award) and was selected in the All-Australian team for the first time.

==== Rising career: 1994–1996 ====
In 1994, he played his 100th premiership season match against North Melbourne in Round 2. He also won his second St Kilda best and fairest award and was selected in the All-Australian team for a second time. In 1995, he was again selected in the All-Australian team for a third selection. Harvey played in St Kilda's 1996 Ansett Australia Cup winning side, the club's first pre-season cup win. He was also selected for the fourth time in the All-Australian Team.

==== Brownlow Medals and captain: 1997–2003 ====
Harvey played in all 22 matches in the 1997 AFL regular season in which St Kilda qualified in first position for the finals series, winning the club's second minor premiership and first McClelland Trophy. St Kilda qualified for the 1997 AFL grand final after wins in the qualifying and preliminary finals. Harvey played in the grand final in which St Kilda was defeated by 31 points.

Harvey gained 756 disposals in 1997 which, at the time, was the highest single-season tally on record—an average of 30 possessions per game. He was recognised for his excellent season with numerous awards. He again won St Kilda's best and fairest award and was also selected again in the 1997 All-Australian team—his fifth All-Australian honour. He also won the 1997 AFL Players Association Most Valuable Player Award (now the Leigh Matthews Trophy) and the league's highest individual award, the Brownlow Medal. Chris Grant gained the most votes; however, Grant was ineligible to win the award due to a one-match suspension for striking Hawthorn's Nick Holland.

Harvey played in the St Kilda side that again qualified for the 1998 finals series. He played his 200th premiership season match that year against West Coast in round 21 at Waverley Park. St Kilda was eliminated from the finals after two consecutive losses. Harvey amassed 501 kicks in 1998 which, at the time, was the highest single-season tally on record. He again won the league's highest individual award, the Brownlow Medal, for a second consecutive season. As of 2020, Harvey is the last man to win two consecutive Brownlow Medals. He also won the Trevor Barker Award for St Kilda's best and fairest player for a second consecutive year—his fourth best-and-fairest award. Harvey was also again selected in the year's All-Australian team, his sixth All-Australian award.

Harvey was selected in the 1999 All-Australian Team—the sixth consecutive year he received an All-Australian selection and his seventh career All-Australian honour. Harvey was named captain of St Kilda for the 2001 and 2002 seasons. He was selected in the 2003 All-Australian team, his eighth All-Australian award. He was also named in St Kilda's Team of the Century (1900–1999) in 2003.

==== Later career and records: 2004–2007 ====
Harvey played in St Kilda's 2004 Wizard Home Loans Cup final winning side – the club's second pre-season cup win. He was judged best on ground in the final and awarded the Michael Tuck Medal. St Kilda won a then club record 10 consecutive matches in the first 10 rounds of the 2004 AFL season. The club went on to qualify for the finals inside the top four. After a qualifying final loss and a semi-final win, Harvey played his 300th game and became the fourth player to play 300 games for St Kilda, in a preliminary final against Port Adelaide. St Kilda were eliminated from the finals series after a six-point loss.

In round 7, 2006 against Geelong, in front of a near full house at Docklands Stadium, Harvey broke the all-time games record for St Kilda (until then held by Nathan Burke) when he played in his 324th premiership season match. To celebrate, the Saints wore special guernseys with Harvey's silhouetted image in the centre. Harvey reached his 350th game against West Coast at Subiaco Oval in round 12, 2007, when the Saints defeated the reigning premiers by 23 points.

==== 21st season and retirement: 2008 ====
To begin what would be his final season, Harvey played in St Kilda's 2008 NAB Cup final winning side, which was the club's third pre-season cup win. By the beginning of the regular season, Harvey became the first player to ever play in 21 consecutive VFL/AFL seasons (since overtaken by Dustin Fletcher's current record of 23 seasons). At 37 years of age, he played in 24 of St Kilda's 25 premiership season matches—including three finals—averaging 21 disposals per game. He had 31 disposals in another best-on-ground performance in St Kilda's Round 13 win against Fremantle.

St Kilda qualified for the 2008 finals series inside the top four for the third time in five years. After a qualifying final loss and a semi-final win, Harvey lined up for St Kilda in what turned out to be his final game in the AFL on 20 September 2008 in a preliminary final against Hawthorn at the Melbourne Cricket Ground, which St Kilda lost by 54 points. Harvey was chaired off the ground by teammates Lenny Hayes and Max Hudghton to a respectful ovation, while players and officials from both sides formed a guard of honour. After the game, a tribute to his long career was played on the big screen.

Harvey ended his career having played 383 games at the top level for over 21 seasons, from the age of 16 until he was 37, the second-longest senior career (in terms of seasons) in VFL/AFL history. The only players (at the time) to have played over 400 games in the VFL/AFL, Michael Tuck and Kevin Bartlett, both expressed their disappointment at what they both thought was a premature retirement, believing Harvey could have followed in their footsteps and reached the elusive 400-game milestone.

Harvey received 215 Brownlow Medal votes during his career, the seventh-highest tally of any player in league history. He was also the only player in league history to have received Brownlow Medal votes in more than 100 games. At the time of his retirement he held the record for most games played without winning a premiership, but he did participate in 17 finals series matches, including one grand final. He was the last remaining VFL/AFL player left who had played in the 1980s.

=== State of Origin ===
Harvey had a prolific State of Origin career. He first played for Victoria in 1991, against South Australia, kicking two goals. The following year, he was named in the best players against Western Australia and won the E. J. Whitten Medal against South Australia, kicking one goal in the match. In 1993, he participated in the State of Origin Carnival, performing on the big stage in the Grand Final, again winning the E. J. Whitten Medal. He was selected in 1995 against South Australia. In 1996, he won the E. J. Whitten Medal for a record third time, against The Allies, kicking one goal. Harvey last played for Victoria in 1997, against South Australia, and was named in the best players. Today, Harvey is still a big supporter of the Victorian State of Origin team.

== Statistics ==
=== Playing statistics ===
Legend
G	Goals	K	Kicks	D	Disposals	T	Tackles
B	Behinds	H	Handballs	M	Marks
†	Led the league for the season	±	Won that season's Brownlow Medal

Season	Team	No.	Games	Totals							Averages (per game)							Votes
Season	Team	No.	Games	G	B	K	H	D	M	T	G	B	K	H	D	M	T	Votes
1988	St Kilda	52	4	3	5	41	15	56	7	3	0.8	1.3	10.3	3.8	14.0	1.8	0.8	0
1989	St Kilda	35	12	13	9	136	121	257	42	11	1.1	0.8	11.3	10.1	21.4	3.5	0.9	4
1990	St Kilda	35	18	13	17	250	193	443	46	15	0.7	0.9	13.9	10.7	24.6	2.6	0.8	4
1991	St Kilda	35	23	16	16	311	294	605	66	24	0.7	0.7	13.5	12.8	26.3	2.9	1.0	9
1992	St Kilda	35	24	9	6	401	288	689	92	26	0.4	0.3	16.7	12.0	28.7	3.8	1.1	12
1993	St Kilda	35	17	8	10	265	169	434	58	29	0.5	0.6	15.6	9.9	25.5	3.4	1.7	12
1994	St Kilda	35	18	6	6	262	212	474	42	30	0.3	0.3	14.6	11.8	26.3	2.3	1.7	2
1995	St Kilda	35	17	10	8	234	217	451	47	22	0.6	0.5	13.8	12.8	26.5	2.8	1.3	16
1996	St Kilda	35	21	12	12	301	296^{†}	597^{†}	70	26	0.6	0.6	14.3	14.1	28.4^{†}	3.3	1.2	17
1997	St Kilda	35	25	18	19	453	303^{†}	756^{†}	90	28	0.7	0.8	18.1	12.1	30.2^{†}	3.6	1.1	26^{±}
1998	St Kilda	35	24	13	14	501^{†}	234	735^{†}	74	36	0.5	0.6	20.9	9.8	30.6^{†}	3.1	1.5	32^{±}
1999	St Kilda	35	17	10	11	299	187	486	59	16	0.6	0.6	17.6	11.0	28.6	3.5	0.9	11
2000	St Kilda	35	16	5	7	246	193	439	73	20	0.3	0.4	15.4	12.1	27.4	4.6	1.3	5
2001	St Kilda	35	9	9	11	135	85	220	36	20	1.0	1.2	15.0	9.4	24.4	4.0	2.2	7
2002	St Kilda	35	10	4	4	122	72	194	28	14	0.4	0.4	12.2	7.2	19.4	2.8	1.4	7
2003	St Kilda	35	22	12	11	361	219	580	114	59	0.5	0.5	16.4	10.0	26.4	5.2	2.7	18
2004	St Kilda	35	23	11	8	301	197	498	100	38	0.5	0.3	13.1	8.6	21.7	4.3	1.7	4
2005	St Kilda	35	17	14	6	208	159	367	90	39	0.8	0.4	12.2	9.4	21.6	5.3	2.3	7
2006	St Kilda	35	23	18	13	299	177	476	146	73	0.8	0.6	13.0	7.7	20.7	6.3	3.2	12
2007	St Kilda	35	19	4	3	231	161	392	105	36	0.2	0.2	12.2	8.5	20.6	5.5	1.9	7
2008	St Kilda	35	24	7	4	291	216	507	129	40	0.3	0.2	12.1	9.0	21.1	5.4	1.7	3
Career			383	215	200	5648	4008	9656	1514	605	0.6	0.5	14.7	10.5	25.2	4.0	1.6	215

=== Coaching statistics ===
Legend
W	Wins	L	Losses	D	Draws	W%	Winning percentage	LP	Ladder position	LT	League teams

Season	Team	Games	W	L	D	W %	LP	LT
2021	Collingwood (Note: Interim coach.)	9	2	7	0	22.2%	—N/a	18
Career totals		9	2	7	0	22.2%		

== Honours and achievements ==
=== Playing ===
Team

- Minor premiership (St Kilda): 1997
- 3× Pre-Season premiership player (St Kilda): 1996, 2004, 2008

Individual

- 2× Brownlow Medal: 1997, 1998
- Leigh Matthews Trophy (AFLPA MVP Award): 1997
- 8× All-Australian team: 1992, 1994, 1995, 1996, 1997, 1998, 1999, 2003
- 4× Trevor Barker Award: 1992, 1994, 1997, 1998
- Australian Football Media Association Player of the Year Award: 1997
- Herald Sun Player of the Year Award: 1997
- Michael Tuck Medal: 2004
- Madden Medal: 2008
- St Kilda Team of the Century

=== Coaching ===
Individual

- AFLCA assistant coach of the year: 2013

=== Halls of fame ===
- Australian Football Hall of Fame inductee
- St Kilda Hall of Fame inductee – Legend status

== Coaching career ==
=== Carlton Football Club assistant coach (2009–2010) ===
On 10 October 2008, it was announced that Harvey was appointed in an assistant coaching position as a development and fitness coach at the Carlton Football Club from 2009. On 2 November 2009, he was promoted from development coach to midfield coach at Carlton and served as a more direct assistant coach under senior coach Brett Ratten.

=== St Kilda Football Club assistant coach (2011) ===
It was formally announced by the Carlton and St Kilda football clubs, on 13 September 2010, that Harvey had accepted an offer to return to St Kilda as an assistant coach beginning with the 2011 pre-season, in the position of St Kilda midfield coach under senior coach Ross Lyon. Following Ross Lyon's departure from the Saints in mid-September 2011, Harvey assumed the role as caretaker senior coach while the search for a new senior coach commenced at St Kilda. On being overlooked for St Kilda's senior coaching role in favour of Scott Watters, Harvey was released from his assistant coaching obligations with St Kilda.

=== Collingwood Football Club assistant coach (2012–2021) ===
Harvey joined the Collingwood Football Club in October 2011 in an assistant coaching role as midfield coach under senior coach Nathan Buckley and was promoted to senior assistant coach during 2013. On 24 September 2013, Harvey was named the AFL's Assistant Coach of the Year at the AFL Coaches Association awards.

=== Collingwood Football Club caretaker senior coach (2021) ===
After Nathan Buckley resigned as Collingwood Football Club senior coach in June 2021, Harvey assumed the role as caretaker senior coach, effective from round 14 of the 2021 AFL season. Harvey coached Collingwood to a total of nine games with two wins and seven losses, and then Collingwood finished in seventeenth place (second-last) position on the ladder in the 2021 season. Harvey then left the club at the end of the 2021 season, after he came to a mutual agreement with the club that a change was needed for both parties in the decision that Harvey would not be retained as Collingwood Football Club senior coach. Harvey described the discussions as "pretty transparent" and that he left "on good terms". Harvey was replaced by Craig McRae as Collingwood Football Club senior coach.

=== Hawthorn Football Club assistant coach (2022) ===
On 22 September 2021, it was announced that Harvey would join Hawthorn as an assistant coach under senior coach Sam Mitchell.

=== St Kilda Football Club assistant coach (2023–present) ===
Following the appointment of Ross Lyon as senior coach of St Kilda, when Lyon returned in his second stint as Saints senior coach, it was announced in October 2022 that Harvey would be returning to St Kilda as an assistant coach under senior coach Ross Lyon.

== Personal life ==
Harvey is married to Danielle Harvey. Danielle appeared on Fox Footy's Living With Footballers before it was cancelled at the end of 2004. They have four children: son Connor and daughters Remi, Alyssa and Sienna.

== See also ==
- Harvey family
