= 1989 Panasonic Cup (Australian rules football) =

- AFL pre-season competition
- Season: 1989
- Teams: 14
- Winners: Melbourne (1st title)
- Matches played: 13
- Attendance: 195,090 (average 15,007 per match)

The 1989 VFL Panasonic Cup was the Victorian Football League Pre-season Cup competition played in its entirety before the Victorian Football League's 1989 Premiership Season began. It culminated the final in March 1989.

== Games ==
=== 1st Round ===
| Home team | Home team score | Away team | Away team score | Ground | Crowd | Date |
|---|---|---|---|---|---|---|
| St Kilda | 10.8 (68) | West Coast | 14.10 (94) | VFL Park | 10,085 | Wednesday 8 February |
| Melbourne | 8.15 (63) | Sydney | 6.11 (47) | VFL Park | 11,554 | Saturday 11 February |
| Fitzroy | 17.18 (120) | Richmond | 12.8 (80) | VFL Park | 8,670 | Sunday 12 February |
| Carlton | 12.7 (79) | North Melbourne | 10.14 (74) | VFL Park | 9,494 | Wednesday 15 February |
| Collingwood | 9.12 (66) | Footscray | 9.13 (67) | VFL Park | 21,158 | Saturday 18 February |
| Essendon | 15.14 (104) | Brisbane | 10.3 (63) | VFL Park | 8,496 | Wednesday 22 February |

=== Quarter-finals ===
| Home team | Home team score | Away team | Away team score | Ground | Crowd | Date |
|---|---|---|---|---|---|---|
| Hawthorn | 13.10 (88) | West Coast | 14.5 (89) (Note: The match was decided after extra time; scores were level at 13.10 (88) to 14.4 (88) after the conclusion of regular time.) | VFL Park | 9,605 | Saturday 25 February |
| Fitzroy | 9.16 (70) | Melbourne | 10.13 (73) | VFL Park | 6,695 | Sunday 26 February |
| Carlton | 14.11 (95) | Footscray | 8.14 (62) | VFL Park | 9,801 | Wednesday 1 March |
| Essendon | 6.8 (44) | Geelong | 16.14 (110) | VFL Park | 20,105 | Saturday 4 March |

=== Semi-finals ===
| Home team | Home team score | Away team | Away team score | Ground | Crowd | Date |
|---|---|---|---|---|---|---|
| Melbourne | 7.13 (55) | West Coast | 6.18 (54) | VFL Park | 7,185 | Wednesday 8 March |
| Carlton | 5.9 (39) | Geelong | 16.16 (112) | VFL Park | 23,522 | Saturday 11 March |

=== Final ===
| Home team | Home team score | Away team | Away team score | Ground | Crowd | Date |
|---|---|---|---|---|---|---|
| Geelong | 9.13 (67) | Melbourne | 10.16 (76) | VFL Park | 48,729 | Saturday 18 March |

== See also ==
- List of Australian Football League night premiers
- 1989 VFL season
