= 1997 AFL season =

101st season of the Australian Football League (AFL)

1997 AFL premiership season
- Teams: 16
- Premiers: Adelaide; 1st premiership
- Minor premiers: St Kilda; 2nd minor premiership
- Pre-season cup: Carlton; 1st pre-season cup win
- Brownlow Medallist: Robert Harvey (St Kilda); 26 votes
- Leading goalkicker: Tony Modra (Adelaide); 84 goals

Attendance
- Matches played: 185
- Total attendance: 6,403,814 (34,615 per match)
- Highest (H&A): 83,247 (round 5, Essendon vs. Collingwood)
- Highest (finals): 99,645 (Grand Final, Adelaide vs. St Kilda)

The 1997 AFL season was the 101st season of the Australian Football League (AFL), the highest level senior Australian rules football competition in Australia, which was known as the Victorian Football League until 1989. The season ran from 27 March until 27 September, and comprised a 22-game home-and-away season followed by a finals series featuring the top eight clubs.

Before the season, the Port Adelaide Football Club (SANFL) was admitted to the league, increasing the South Australian membership to two clubs. Foundation club Fitzroy, which had gone into administration in 1996, merged with the Brisbane Bears to form a new Queensland-based team known as the Brisbane Lions. The Footscray Football Club changed its name to the Western Bulldogs. With these changes, the league's size remained at sixteen clubs.

The premiership was won by the Adelaide Football Club for the first time, after it defeated St Kilda by 31 points in the 1997 AFL Grand Final.

== Home-and-away season ==
=== Round 1 ===
	Round 1
Thursday, 27 March (7:40 pm)	North Melbourne 7.13 (55)	def. by	Melbourne 10.10 (70)	MCG (crowd: 35,802)	Report
Saturday, 29 March (2:10 pm)	Collingwood 26.10 (166)	def.	Port Adelaide 13.9 (87)	MCG (crowd: 51,883)	Report
Saturday, 29 March (2:10 pm)	Western Bulldogs 11.10 (76)	def. by	Fremantle 10.20 (80)	Optus Oval (crowd: 8,664)	Report
Saturday, 29 March (7:40 pm)	St Kilda 10.11 (71)	def. by	Hawthorn 11.11 (77)	Waverley Park (crowd: 35,732)	Report
Saturday, 29 March (6:40 pm)	West Coast 12.6 (78)	def.	Sydney 5.7 (37)	Subiaco Oval (crowd: 29,965)	Report
Sunday, 30 March (1:40 pm)	Adelaide 20.12 (132)	def.	Brisbane Lions 14.12 (96)	Football Park (crowd: 36,602)	Report
Sunday, 30 March (2:10 pm)	Richmond 15.14 (104)	def.	Geelong 13.17 (95)	MCG (crowd: 48,358)	Report
Monday, 31 March (2:10 pm)	Essendon 16.10 (106)	def.	Carlton 15.9 (99)	MCG (crowd: 82,363)	Report
Port Adelaide endured a disappointing AFL debut at the MCG in front of over 50,000 spectators, with Collingwood jumping out to a 22-point lead at quarter time and extending the lead at each change to run out comfortable 79-point winners. Speedy midfielder Paul Williams was considered best-on-ground with 30 touches and 4 goals, while Nathan Buckley (who won a Magarey with Port in the SANFL) racked up 23 kicks and Saverio Rocca made the most of limited opportunities to kick six goals. For Port, Donald Dickie (26 touches), Fabian Francis (20 touches, 2 goals) and eventual Rising Star winner Michael Wilson were among Port's better players.; The Easter Monday clash between Essendon and Carlton is best remembered not for its close finish but for what happened after the game. The ongoing feud between Sean Denham and Greg Williams (which had stemmed from the 1993 Grand final) had reached a critical point, with both players engaged in a heated argument before umpire Andrew Coates tried to intervene, only to be pushed away by Williams. Despite the innocuous nature of the contact, the AFL Tribunal suspended Williams for nine matches. The incident was one of football's major talking points that year, leading to a Supreme Court battle between Carlton and the AFL, and eventually the establishment of the AFL Appeals Board.

=== Round 2 ===
Home team	Home team score	Away team	Away team score	Ground	Crowd	Date
Melbourne	7.14 (56)	Collingwood	24.19 (163)	MCG	61,138	Friday 4, April
Richmond	19.14 (128)	Adelaide	15.10 (100)	MCG	32,880	Saturday 5, April
Geelong	11.12 (78)	West Coast	11.6 (72)	Kardinia Park	17,988	Saturday 5, April
Western Bulldogs	13.12 (90)	Sydney	12.11 (83)	Princes Park	12,604	Saturday 5, April
Brisbane Lions	23.16 (154)	St Kilda	7.15 (57)	Gabba	17,123	Sunday 6, April
Port Adelaide	8.12 (60)	Essendon	14.9 (93)	Football Park	32,747	Sunday 6, April
Fremantle	13.9 (87)	Hawthorn	10.13 (73)	Subiaco Oval	19,057	Sunday 6, April
North Melbourne	12.14 (86)	Carlton	8.12 (60)	MCG	38,170	Monday 7, April

=== Round 3 ===
Home team	Home team score	Away team	Away team score	Ground	Crowd	Date
Sydney	15.9 (99)	Melbourne	14.7 (91)	SCG	23,598	Friday 11, April
Western Bulldogs	16.9 (105)	Richmond	12.14 (86)	MCG	35,438	Saturday 12, April
St Kilda	19.11 (125)	Collingwood	17.16 (118)	Waverley Park	54,699	Saturday 12, April
Port Adelaide	18.21 (129)	Geelong	14.6 (90)	Football Park	32,074	Saturday 12, April
Essendon	18.14 (122)	North Melbourne	12.8 (80)	MCG	57,978	Sunday 13, April
Carlton	15.18 (108)	Adelaide	12.8 (80)	Princes Park	25,966	Sunday 13, April
Hawthorn	12.15 (87)	Brisbane Lions	11.9 (75)	Waverley Park	27,947	Sunday 13, April
West Coast	16.15 (111)	Fremantle	9.17 (71)	Subiaco Oval	39,294	Sunday 13, April

=== Round 4 ===
Home team	Home team score	Away team	Away team score	Ground	Crowd	Date
Melbourne	13.9 (87)	Western Bulldogs	13.11 (89)	MCG	28,043	Friday 18, April
Collingwood	12.12 (84)	Carlton	15.11 (101)	MCG	78,704	Saturday 19, April
Richmond	10.12 (72)	Fremantle	10.7 (67)	Princes Park	15,461	Saturday 19, April
West Coast	17.10 (112)	Hawthorn	13.10 (88)	Subiaco Oval	38,222	Saturday 19, April
St Kilda	12.9 (81)	Sydney	18.19 (127)	Waverley Park	35,061	Saturday 19, April
Brisbane Lions	15.19 (109)	North Melbourne	12.11 (83)	Gabba	18,575	Sunday 20, April
Adelaide	11.6 (72)	Port Adelaide	11.17 (83)	Football Park	47,256	Sunday 20, April
Geelong	11.19 (85)	Essendon	11.12 (78)	MCG	54,922	Sunday 20, April

=== Round 5 ===
Home team	Home team score	Away team	Away team score	Ground	Crowd	Date
Essendon	10.10 (70)	Collingwood	14.15 (99)	MCG	83,271	Friday 25, April
Fremantle	16.11 (107)	St Kilda	15.11 (101)	Subiaco Oval	23,504	Friday 25, April
Melbourne	12.6 (78)	West Coast	19.12 (126)	MCG	19,655	Saturday 26, April
Western Bulldogs	9.17 (71)	Adelaide	19.7 (121)	Princes Park	12,694	Saturday 26, April
Hawthorn	15.9 (99)	Sydney	11.8 (74)	Waverley Park	37,576	Saturday 26, April
Port Adelaide	10.13 (73)	Brisbane Lions	10.11 (71)	Football Park	31,757	Sunday 27, April
North Melbourne	21.15 (141)	Richmond	7.4 (46)	MCG	44,449	Sunday 27, April
Carlton	12.14 (86)	Geelong	13.16 (94)	Princes Park	25,801	Sunday 27, April

=== Round 6 ===
Home team	Home team score	Away team	Away team score	Ground	Crowd	Date
West Coast	14.15 (99)	Western Bulldogs	17.11 (113)	WACA	29,838	Friday 2, May
Essendon	15.12 (102)	Brisbane Lions	9.17 (71)	MCG	37,642	Saturday 3, May
Collingwood	13.6 (84)	Adelaide	11.17 (83)	Victoria Park	24,663	Saturday 3, May
Geelong	14.13 (97)	Fremantle	6.7 (43)	Kardinia Park	16,467	Saturday 3, May
Hawthorn	14.9 (93)	North Melbourne	16.7 (103)	Waverley Park	38,953	Saturday 3, May
Sydney	21.16 (142)	Carlton	11.17 (83)	SCG	37,933	Sunday 4, May
St Kilda	17.19 (121)	Melbourne	4.11 (35)	Waverley Park	21,104	Sunday 4, May
Port Adelaide	19.8 (122)	Richmond	8.10 (58)	Football Park	36,090	Sunday 4, May

=== Round 7 ===
Home team	Home team score	Away team	Away team score	Ground	Crowd	Date
North Melbourne	9.14 (68)	Collingwood	17.9 (111)	MCG	54,901	Friday 9, May
Richmond	10.16 (76)	Carlton	14.14 (98)	MCG	48,833	Saturday 10, May
Western Bulldogs	19.19 (133)	Hawthorn	13.10 (88)	Princes Park	18,860	Saturday 10, May
Geelong	11.10 (76)	Sydney	6.8 (44)	Kardinia Park	22,151	Saturday 10, May
Fremantle	17.22 (124)	Melbourne	10.9 (69)	WACA	18,198	Saturday 10, May
St Kilda	20.6 (126)	Port Adelaide	8.13 (61)	Waverley Park	17,752	Saturday 10, May
Brisbane Lions	8.12 (60)	West Coast	21.13 (139)	Gabba	17,524	Sunday 11, May
Adelaide	18.18 (126)	Essendon	11.7 (73)	Football Park	39,275	Sunday 11, May

=== Round 8 ===
Home team	Home team score	Away team	Away team score	Ground	Crowd	Date
Collingwood	19.15 (129)	Western Bulldogs	11.17 (83)	MCG	61,014	Friday 16, May
Melbourne	7.7 (49)	Geelong	19.14 (128)	MCG	28,989	Saturday 17, May
North Melbourne	19.14 (128)	Port Adelaide	15.10 (100)	Princes Park	13,056	Saturday 17, May
Adelaide	22.12 (144)	Sydney	8.7 (55)	Football Park	40,147	Saturday 17, May
Essendon	14.16 (100)	St Kilda	18.16 (124)	MCG	51,928	Sunday 18, May
Carlton	15.16 (106)	Hawthorn	12.9 (81)	Princes Park	29,783	Sunday 18, May
Fremantle	14.14 (98)	Brisbane Lions	15.3 (93)	Subiaco Oval	14,721	Sunday 18, May
Richmond	18.11 (119)	West Coast	9.13 (67)	MCG	26,721	Monday 19, May

=== Round 9 ===
Home team	Home team score	Away team	Away team score	Ground	Crowd	Date
Port Adelaide	10.18 (78)	Melbourne	3.9 (27)	Football Park	32,958	Friday 23, May
Carlton	16.9 (105)	Fremantle	14.4 (88)	Princes Park	18,187	Saturday 24, May
Hawthorn	13.10 (88)	Adelaide	14.18 (102)	Waverley Park	23,463	Saturday 24, May
Sydney	16.15 (111)	Collingwood	11.8 (74)	SCG	39,780	Saturday 24, May
Brisbane Lions	19.12 (126)	Geelong	15.8 (98)	Gabba	19,828	Sunday 25, May
West Coast	16.14 (110)	Essendon	13.7 (85)	Subiaco Oval	38,984	Sunday 25, May
Western Bulldogs	16.7 (103)	North Melbourne	10.11 (71)	MCG	29,307	Sunday 25, May
St Kilda	22.9 (141)	Richmond	14.10 (94)	Waverley Park	52,257	Sunday 25, May

=== Round 10 ===
Home team	Home team score	Away team	Away team score	Ground	Crowd	Date
Port Adelaide	14.9 (93)	Carlton	7.13 (55)	Football Park	40,116	Friday 30, May
North Melbourne	15.13 (103)	West Coast	9.4 (58)	Princes Park	13,614	Saturday 31, May
Hawthorn	16.12 (108)	Collingwood	8.7 (55)	Waverley Park	51,494	Saturday 31, May
Geelong	16.11 (107)	St Kilda	11.13 (79)	Kardinia Park	22,731	Saturday 31, May
Richmond	9.13 (67)	Melbourne	14.8 (92)	MCG	28,879	Saturday 31, May
Essendon	17.12 (114)	Western Bulldogs	20.16 (136)	MCG	50,138	Sunday 1, June
Brisbane Lions	13.14 (92)	Sydney	13.11 (89)	Gabba	20,403	Sunday 1, June
Fremantle	10.12 (72)	Adelaide	16.9 (105)	Subiaco Oval	22,464	Monday 2, June

=== Round 11 ===
Home team	Home team score	Away team	Away team score	Ground	Crowd	Date
Collingwood	10.11 (71)	Richmond	11.11 (77)	MCG	70,350	Friday 6, June
Essendon	13.13 (91)	Hawthorn	17.22 (124)	MCG	60,594	Saturday 7, June
Western Bulldogs	14.12 (96)	Geelong	11.9 (75)	Princes Park	24,897	Saturday 7, June
Port Adelaide	4.17 (41)	Sydney	10.16 (76)	Football Park	35,669	Saturday 7, June
Melbourne	5.15 (45)	Adelaide	14.13 (97)	MCG	27,463	Sunday 8, June
West Coast	11.7 (73)	St Kilda	13.11 (89)	Subiaco Oval	29,390	Sunday 8, June
North Melbourne	15.15 (105)	Fremantle	12.7 (79)	MCG	20,585	Monday 9, June
Carlton	12.12 (84)	Brisbane Lions	9.9 (63)	Princes Park	27,904	Monday 9, June

=== Round 12 ===
Home team	Home team score	Away team	Away team score	Ground	Crowd	Date
Sydney	26.8 (164)	Richmond	16.14 (110)	SCG	35,033	Friday 13, June
Western Bulldogs	12.10 (82)	Port Adelaide	14.10 (94)	Princes Park	14,025	Saturday 14, June
Collingwood	7.13 (55)	West Coast	11.5 (71)	Victoria Park	25,323	Saturday 14, June
Geelong	12.10 (82)	Hawthorn	13.10 (88)	Kardinia Park	22,871	Saturday 14, June
St Kilda	16.20 (116)	Carlton	12.13 (85)	Waverley Park	44,883	Sunday 15, June
Adelaide	12.11 (83)	North Melbourne	16.9 (105)	Football Park	43,345	Sunday 15, June
Melbourne	7.8 (50)	Brisbane Lions	21.9 (135)	MCG	13,392	Sunday 15, June
Fremantle	24.13 (157)	Essendon	9.6 (60)	Subiaco Oval	21,956	Sunday 15, June

=== Round 13 ===
Home team	Home team score	Away team	Away team score	Ground	Crowd	Date
West Coast	11.13 (79)	Carlton	12.14 (86)	Subiaco Oval	37,854	Friday 27, June
Richmond	4.10 (34)	Essendon	19.13 (127)	MCG	58,812	Saturday 28, June
St Kilda	11.18 (84)	Western Bulldogs	15.11 (101)	Waverley Park	32,370	Saturday 28, June
Geelong	17.8 (110)	Adelaide	7.12 (54)	Kardinia Park	20,236	Saturday 28, June
Brisbane Lions	11.22 (88)	Collingwood	11.7 (73)	Gabba	19,560	Saturday 28, June
Port Adelaide	10.9 (69)	Fremantle	7.12 (54)	Football Park	30,827	Saturday 28, June
Hawthorn	17.16 (118)	Melbourne	7.13 (55)	Waverley Park	31,517	Sunday 29, June
Sydney	8.17 (65)	North Melbourne	7.13 (55)	SCG	30,160	Sunday 29, June

=== Round 14 ===
Home team	Home team score	Away team	Away team score	Ground	Crowd	Date
Adelaide	16.10 (106)	West Coast	4.7 (31)	Football Park	39,221	Friday 4, July
Geelong	9.26 (80)	Collingwood	10.12 (72)	MCG	65,228	Saturday 5, July
Carlton	11.8 (74)	Western Bulldogs	16.14 (110)	Princes Park	32,183	Saturday 5, July
St Kilda	20.13 (133)	North Melbourne	11.13 (79)	Waverley Park	32,635	Saturday 5, July
Fremantle	6.12 (48)	Sydney	3.15 (33)	WACA	19,290	Saturday 5, July
Essendon	18.12 (120)	Melbourne	8.9 (57)	MCG	44,803	Sunday 6, July
Hawthorn	18.16 (124)	Port Adelaide	13.14 (92)	Waverley Park	29,886	Sunday 6, July
Brisbane Lions	7.26 (68)	Richmond	7.8 (50)	Gabba	19,155	Sunday 6, July

=== Round 15 ===
Home team	Home team score	Away team	Away team score	Ground	Crowd	Date
North Melbourne	14.8 (92)	Geelong	15.12 (102)	MCG	45,120	Friday 11, July
Melbourne	18.11 (119)	Carlton	15.10 (100)	MCG	27,992	Saturday 12, July
Western Bulldogs	11.7 (73)	Brisbane Lions	21.11 (137)	Princes Park	16,430	Saturday 12, July
Collingwood	25.10 (160)	Fremantle	9.6 (60)	Victoria Park	23,433	Saturday 12, July
Adelaide	10.16 (76)	St Kilda	9.12 (66)	Football Park	39,921	Saturday 12, July
Sydney	11.13 (79)	Essendon	11.12 (78)	SCG	36,077	Sunday 13, July
West Coast	12.13 (85)	Port Adelaide	9.13 (67)	Subiaco Oval	29,723	Sunday 13, July
Richmond	22.13 (145)	Hawthorn	10.9 (69)	MCG	49,217	Sunday 13, July

=== Round 16 ===
Home team	Home team score	Away team	Away team score	Ground	Crowd	Date
Brisbane Lions	17.16 (118)	Adelaide	13.9 (87)	Gabba	21,348	Friday 18, July
Carlton	25.15 (165)	Essendon	13.9 (87)	MCG	58,512	Saturday 19, July
Hawthorn	9.8 (62)	St Kilda	20.21 (141)	Waverley Park	43,181	Saturday 19, July
Geelong	16.14 (110)	Richmond	12.6 (78)	Kardinia Park	24,099	Saturday 19, July
Sydney	15.22 (112)	West Coast	11.9 (75)	SCG	39,318	Saturday 19, July
Port Adelaide	17.9 (111)	Collingwood	8.10 (58)	Football Park	37,790	Saturday 19, July
Melbourne	7.16 (58)	North Melbourne	17.12 (114)	MCG	23,309	Sunday 20, July
Fremantle	15.7 (97)	Western Bulldogs	13.13 (91)	Subiaco Oval	18,392	Sunday 20, July

=== Round 17 ===
Home team	Home team score	Away team	Away team score	Ground	Crowd	Date
Essendon	10.12 (72)	Port Adelaide	18.14 (122)	MCG	33,076	Friday 25, July
Carlton	7.16 (58)	North Melbourne	14.12 (96)	Princes Park	27,689	Saturday 26, July
Hawthorn	9.8 (62)	Fremantle	10.11 (71)	Waverley Park	15,939	Saturday 26, July
Sydney	22.17 (149)	Western Bulldogs	7.10 (52)	SCG	32,534	Saturday 26, July
Adelaide	29.11 (185)	Richmond	7.6 (48)	Football Park	36,297	Saturday 26, July
St Kilda	12.20 (92)	Brisbane Lions	5.14 (44)	Waverley Park	34,859	Sunday 27, July
Collingwood	20.14 (134)	Melbourne	12.10 (82)	MCG	37,779	Sunday 27, July
West Coast	20.9 (129)	Geelong	12.10 (82)	Subiaco Oval	34,565	Sunday 27, July

=== Round 18 ===
Home team	Home team score	Away team	Away team score	Ground	Crowd	Date
North Melbourne	11.17 (83)	Essendon	8.16 (64)	MCG	38,614	Friday 1, August
Melbourne	7.11 (53)	Sydney	25.19 (169)	MCG	26,901	Saturday 2, August
Richmond	17.13 (115)	Western Bulldogs	15.10 (100)	Princes Park	18,373	Saturday 2, August
Geelong	25.9 (159)	Port Adelaide	11.8 (74)	Kardinia Park	21,867	Saturday 2, August
Brisbane Lions	21.15 (141)	Hawthorn	11.5 (71)	Gabba	19,635	Saturday 2, August
Adelaide	18.19 (127)	Carlton	13.8 (86)	Football Park	42,548	Sunday 3, August
Collingwood	12.17 (89)	St Kilda	15.21 (111)	MCG	68,036	Sunday 3, August
Fremantle	7.7 (49)	West Coast	13.4 (82)	Subiaco Oval	39,711	Sunday 3, August

=== Round 19 ===
Home team	Home team score	Away team	Away team score	Ground	Crowd	Date
North Melbourne	17.14 (116)	Brisbane Lions	9.5 (59)	MCG	27,021	Friday 8, August
Carlton	14.23 (107)	Collingwood	13.13 (91)	MCG	61,650	Saturday 9, August
Western Bulldogs	14.18 (102)	Melbourne	9.10 (64)	Princes Park	13,058	Saturday 9, August
Hawthorn	10.6 (66)	West Coast	13.9 (87)	Waverley Park	20,517	Saturday 9, August
Fremantle	12.13 (85)	Richmond	5.12 (42)	WACA	15,757	Saturday 9, August
Sydney	17.17 (119)	St Kilda	18.20 (128)	SCG	39,287	Sunday 10, August
Essendon	11.7 (73)	Geelong	9.14 (68)	MCG	53,901	Sunday 10, August
Port Adelaide	9.4 (58)	Adelaide	9.11 (65)	Football Park	45,498	Sunday 10, August

=== Round 20 ===
Home team	Home team score	Away team	Away team score	Ground	Crowd	Date
West Coast	15.7 (97)	Melbourne	7.17 (59)	WACA	21,164	Friday 15, August
Collingwood	13.13 (91)	Essendon	12.9 (81)	MCG	50,944	Saturday 16, August
St Kilda	12.5 (77)	Fremantle	9.10 (64)	Waverley Park	26,201	Saturday 16, August
Geelong	13.17 (95)	Carlton	9.13 (67)	Kardinia Park	23,007	Saturday 16, August
Brisbane Lions	13.15 (93)	Port Adelaide	13.15 (93)	Gabba	20,835	Saturday 16, August
Sydney	20.15 (135)	Hawthorn	11.11 (77)	SCG	34,111	Sunday 17, August
Richmond	14.13 (97)	North Melbourne	14.12 (96)	MCG	29,620	Sunday 17, August
Adelaide	7.18 (60)	Western Bulldogs	16.7 (103)	Football Park	39,632	Sunday 17, August

=== Round 21 ===
Home team	Home team score	Away team	Away team score	Ground	Crowd	Date
Melbourne	8.14 (62)	St Kilda	17.12 (114)	MCG	32,935	Friday 22, August
North Melbourne	10.21 (81)	Hawthorn	6.7 (43)	MCG	26,393	Saturday 23, August
Carlton	11.10 (76)	Sydney	5.11 (41)	Princes Park	27,375	Saturday 23, August
Western Bulldogs	12.14 (86)	West Coast	10.8 (68)	Whitten Oval	26,704	Saturday 23, August
Brisbane Lions	15.12 (102)	Essendon	16.10 (106)	Gabba	21,065	Saturday 23, August
Richmond	22.14 (146)	Port Adelaide	8.13 (61)	MCG	22,516	Sunday 24, August
Fremantle	9.14 (68)	Geelong	14.16 (100)	Subiaco Oval	28,751	Sunday 24, August
Adelaide	6.12 (48)	Collingwood	5.9 (39)	Football Park	37,661	Monday 25, August

=== Round 22 ===
Home team	Home team score	Away team	Away team score	Ground	Crowd	Date
West Coast	18.12 (120)	Brisbane Lions	11.15 (81)	WACA	29,402	Friday 29, August
Melbourne	18.11 (119)	Fremantle	11.13 (79)	MCG	15,036	Saturday 30, August
Carlton	13.11 (89)	Richmond	13.13 (91)	Princes Park	34,922	Saturday 30, August
Hawthorn	13.9 (87)	Western Bulldogs	15.15 (105)	Waverley Park	35,706	Saturday 30, August
Sydney	13.12 (90)	Geelong	15.10 (100)	SCG	46,168	Saturday 30, August
Collingwood	18.14 (122)	North Melbourne	15.21 (111)	MCG	43,660	Sunday 31, August
Essendon	16.6 (102)	Adelaide	14.14 (98)	Princes Park	25,636	Sunday 31, August
Port Adelaide	12.12 (84)	St Kilda	17.15 (117)	Football Park	38,589	Sunday 31, August

== Ladder ==
(P)	Premiers
	Qualified for finals

#	Team	P	W	L	D	PF	PA	%	Pts
1	St Kilda	22	15	7	0	2294	1918	119.6	60
2	Geelong	22	15	7	0	2111	1791	117.9	60
3	Western Bulldogs	22	14	8	0	2100	2062	101.8	56
4	Adelaide (P)	22	13	9	0	2151	1769	121.6	52
5	West Coast	22	13	9	0	1969	1770	111.2	52
6	Sydney	22	12	10	0	2093	1801	116.2	48
7	North Melbourne	22	12	10	0	2051	1835	111.8	48
8	Brisbane Lions	22	10	11	1	2076	1973	105.2	42
9	Port Adelaide	22	10	11	1	1852	2017	91.8	42
10	Collingwood	22	10	12	0	2138	1919	111.4	40
11	Carlton	22	10	12	0	1978	2045	96.7	40
12	Fremantle	22	10	12	0	1748	1902	91.9	40
13	Richmond	22	10	12	0	1883	2253	83.6	40
14	Essendon	22	9	13	0	2004	2170	92.4	36
15	Hawthorn	22	8	14	0	1873	2144	87.4	32
16	Melbourne	22	4	18	0	1477	2429	60.8	16

Rules for classification: 1. premiership points; 2. percentage; 3. points for
Average score: 90.3
Source: AFL Tables

== Progression by round ==
Numbers highlighted in green indicate that the team finished the round inside the top 8.
Numbers highlighted in blue indicates the team finished first on the ladder in that round.
Numbers highlighted in red indicates the team finished in last place on the ladder in that round.

Team ╲ Round	1	2	3	4	5	6	7	8	9	10	11	12	13	14	15	16	17	18	19	20	21	22
St Kilda	0	0	4	4	4	8	12	16	20	20	24	28	28	32	32	36	40	44	48	52	56	60
Geelong	0	4	4	8	12	16	20	24	24	28	28	28	32	36	40	44	44	48	48	52	56	60
Western Bulldogs	0	4	8	12	12	16	20	20	24	28	32	32	36	40	40	40	40	40	44	48	52	56
Adelaide	4	4	4	4	8	8	12	16	20	24	28	28	28	32	36	36	40	44	48	48	52	52
West Coast	4	4	8	12	16	16	20	20	24	24	24	28	28	28	32	32	36	40	44	48	48	52
Sydney	0	0	4	8	8	12	12	12	16	16	20	24	28	28	32	36	40	44	44	48	48	48
North Melbourne	0	4	4	4	8	12	12	16	16	20	24	28	28	28	28	32	36	40	44	44	48	48
Brisbane Lions	0	4	4	8	8	8	8	8	12	16	16	20	24	28	32	36	36	40	40	42	42	42
Port Adelaide	0	0	4	8	12	16	16	16	20	24	24	28	32	32	32	36	40	40	40	42	42	42
Collingwood	4	8	8	8	12	16	20	24	24	24	24	24	24	24	28	28	32	32	32	36	36	40
Carlton	0	0	4	8	8	8	12	16	20	20	24	24	28	28	28	32	32	32	36	36	40	40
Fremantle	4	8	8	8	12	12	16	20	20	20	20	24	24	28	28	32	36	36	40	40	40	40
Richmond	4	8	8	12	12	12	12	16	16	16	20	20	20	20	24	24	24	28	28	32	36	40
Essendon	4	8	12	12	12	16	16	16	16	16	16	16	20	24	24	24	24	24	28	28	32	36
Hawthorn	4	4	8	8	12	12	12	12	12	16	20	24	28	32	32	32	32	32	32	32	32	32
Melbourne	4	4	4	4	4	4	4	4	4	8	8	8	8	8	12	12	12	12	12	12	12	16

Source: AFL Tables

== Finals series ==
=== Week one ===
	Qualifying finals
QF2: Saturday, 6 September (2:30 pm)	Western Bulldogs 18.11 (119)	def.	Sydney 12.12 (84)	MCG (crowd: 62,432)	Report
QF1: Sunday, 7 September (2:30 pm)	Adelaide 14.15 (99)	def.	West Coast 9.12 (66)	Football Park (crowd: 43,761)	Report
QF4: Sunday, 7 September (2:30 pm)	St Kilda 20.15 (135)	def.	Brisbane Lions 13.11 (89)	Waverley Park (crowd: 50,035)	Report
QF3: Sunday, 7 September (7:00 pm)	Geelong 9.7 (61)	def. by	North Melbourne 11.13 (79)	MCG (crowd: 55,561)	Report
The St Kilda versus Brisbane Lions finals match was the last ever finals match to be played at Waverley Park.; The Adelaide versus West Coast match was originally scheduled as a night match on Saturday, but to avoid a television conflict with the funeral of Princess Diana, the game was rescheduled as a Sunday afternoon fixture.

=== Week two ===
	Semi-finals
SF1: Saturday, 13 September (2:30 pm)	North Melbourne 15.8 (98)	def.	West Coast 12.13 (85)	MCG (crowd: 55,781)	Report
SF2: Saturday, 13 September (7:45 pm)	Adelaide 11.10 (76)	def.	Geelong 9.14 (68)	Football Park (crowd: 46,319)	Report
The Adelaide versus Geelong semi final was notable due to an incident in the third quarter, when a forward 50 mark to Geelong's Leigh Colbert was not awarded by field umpire Grant Vernon, denying Geelong a crucial shot at goal. This incident was later confirmed as an error by the AFL umpiring association.

=== Week three ===
	Preliminary finals
PF2: Friday, 19 September (7:45 pm)	St Kilda 15.14 (104)	def.	North Melbourne 11.7 (73)	MCG (crowd: 77,531)	Report
PF1: Saturday, 20 September (2:30 pm)	Western Bulldogs 13.13 (91)	def. by	Adelaide 12.21 (93)	MCG (crowd: 70,088)	Report

=== Week four ===
	Grand final
Saturday, 27 September (2:45 pm)	St Kilda 13.16 (94)	def. by	Adelaide 19.11 (125)	MCG (crowd: 99,645)	Report
This was the first appearance in a grand final for Adelaide.

== Attendance ==
Team	Hosted	Average	Highest	Lowest	Total	Last season	±
Essendon	11	52,848	83,271	25,636	581,330	49,526	+ 3322
Collingwood	11	48,708	78,704	23,433	535,789	44,723	+ 3985
Adelaide	11	40,173	47,256	36,297	441,905	39,428	+ 745
Port Adelaide	11	35,829	45,498	31,757	394,115	11,017*	+ 24812*
Sydney	11	35,818	46,168	23,598	393,999	24,574	+ 11244
St Kilda	11	35,232	54,699	17,752	387,553	27,137	+ 8095
Richmond	11	34,515	58,812	15,461	379,670	38,624	4109
Carlton	11	33,634	61,650	18,187	369,972	35,891	2257
West Coast	11	32,582	39,294	21,164	358,401	32,448	+ 134
North Melbourne	11	32,520	54,901	13,056	357,725	34,627	2107
Hawthorn	11	32,380	51,494	15,939	356,179	23,624	+ 8756
Geelong	11	28,324	65,228	16,467	311,567	25,161	+ 3163
Melbourne	11	27,714	61,138	13,392	304,853	30,315	2601
Fremantle	11	21,982	39,711	14,721	241,801	22,473	491
Brisbane Lions	11	19,550	21,348	17,123	215,051	N/A	N/A
Western Bulldogs	11	19,335	35,438	8664	212,681	18,073	+ 1262
Totals	176	33,197	83,271	8664	5842,591	29,637	+ 3560

Venue	Hosted	Average	Highest	Lowest	Total	Last season	±
MCG	53	43,488	83,271	13,392	2,304,865	46,114	2626
Football Park	22	38,001	47,256	31,757	836,020	39,428	1427
SCG	11	35,818	46,168	23,598	393,999	24,574	+ 11,244
Waverley Park	22	33,806	54,699	15,939	743,732	25,545	+ 8261
Subiaco Oval	17	28,371	39,711	14,721	482,310	28,289	+ 82
Whitten Oval	1	26,704	26,704	26,704	26,704	10,482	+ 16,222
Victoria Park	3	24,473	25,323	23,433	73,419	23,581	+ 892
WACA	5	23,578	29,838	18,198	117,892	25,253	1675
Kardinia Park	9	21,269	24,099	16,467	191,417	22,670	1401
Optus Oval	22	20,781	34,922	8664	457,182	15,641	+ 5140
Gabba	11	19,550	21,348	17,123	215,051	18,088	+ 1462
Totals	176	33,197	83,271	8664	5842,591	29,637	+ 3560

== Notable events ==
- The last AFL regular season game at Whitten Oval was played in Round 21, with hosts the Western Bulldogs defeating West Coast by 18 points.
- St Kilda finished on top of the ladder (prior to the finals) to claim the minor premiership, despite losing 7 matches in the home and away season. No team before or since has finished on top with that many losses; however, Essendon topped the ladder in 1993 with a lower winning percentage (67.5% to St Kilda's 68.18%) in a 20-game season. St Kilda would also play in their first preliminary final since 1972 and reach their first grand final since 1971.
- The first qualifying final between Adelaide and West Coast was rescheduled from Saturday evening to Sunday afternoon to allow the Seven Network to screen the funeral of Princess Diana live across Australia. This meant that it was played at the same time as the fourth qualifying final between minor premiers St Kilda and the Brisbane Lions, who were competing in their first season as a merged entity. The game is also notable for being the first ever final between two non-Victorian teams.
- Gary Ablett Sr., arguably one of the games best and most well known players, officially announced his retirement during the Preliminary Final weekend. Ablett failed to play a game in 1997 due to a knee injury.

== Sources ==
- 1997 AFL season at AFL Tables
- 1997 AFL season at Australian Football
