= List of AFL debuts in 1998 =

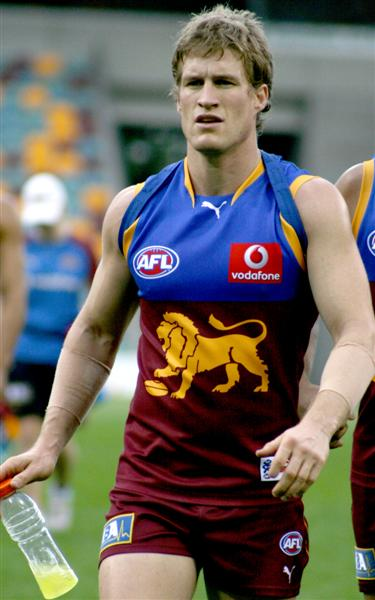
Luke Power debuted in round 2 and was nominated for the 1998 AFL Rising Star award.

A total of 82 players made their debut in the Australian Football League's 1998 season, while another 39 players debuted for a new club having previously played for another club.

== Debuts ==
Name	Club	Age at debut	Round debuted	Games	Goals	Notes
Nathan Bassett	Adelaide	21 years, 111 days	1	210	25	2006 All-Australian.
Ian Perrie	Adelaide	19 years, 73 days	13	116	129	2000 AFL Rising Star nominee (Round 12).
Mark Stevens	Adelaide	22 years, 154 days	1	101	103	Previously played for North Melbourne.
Ben Marsh	Adelaide	21 years, 354 days	14	48	17	
James Thiessen	Adelaide	24 years, 46 days	1	44	21	Son of Tony Thiessen. Previously played for Richmond.
Andrew Eccles	Adelaide	18 years, 308 days	2	41	22	1998 AFL Rising Star nominee (Round 19).
Ian Downsborough	Adelaide	26 years, 83 days	3	12	6	Previously played for West Coast and Port Adelaide.
Sudjai Cook	Adelaide	21 years, 330 days	9	7	2	
Lance Picioane	Adelaide	17 years, 294 days	1	4	2	
Linden Stevens	Adelaide	20 years, 78 days	22	2	0	
Simon Black	Brisbane Lions	18 years, 359 days	1	322	171	2002 Brownlow Medalist, 2003 Norm Smith Medallist, 2001, 2002, and 2006 Merrett–Murray Medallist, 2001, 2002 and 2004 All-Australian and Brisbane games record holder.
Luke Power	Brisbane Lions	18 years, 87 days	2	282	226	2004 All-Australian, 1998 AFL Rising Star (Round 2) and 1999 AFL Rising Star nominee (Round 19).
Tim Notting	Brisbane Lions	19 years, 206 days	8	208	138	1999 AFL Rising Star nominee (Round 21)
Brad Scott	Brisbane Lions	21 years, 329 days	1	146	39	Previously played for Hawthorn.
Beau McDonald	Brisbane Lions	18 years, 167 days	1	91	19	2000 AFL Rising Star nominee (Round 21)
Marcus Picken	Brisbane Lions	18 years, 186 days	3	25	9	Son of Billy Picken and brother of Liam Picken.
Shane O'Bree	Brisbane Lions	19 years, 21 days	2	19	3	1999 Rising Star nominee (Round 1)
Rory Hilton	Brisbane Lions	19 years, 17 days	6	9	3	
Derek Wirth	Brisbane Lions	19 years, 245 days	18	1	2	
Kris Massie	Carlton	17 years, 352 days	8	43	12	1998 Rising Star nominee (Round 20)
Damien Lock	Carlton	19 years, 178 days	1	18	0	
Tony Bourke	Carlton	22 years, 8 days	13	4	0	
John Hynes	Carlton	19 years, 161 days	18	4	2	
Damian Lang	Carlton	22 years, 67 days	7	3	1	Previously played for Sydney.
Sean Charles	Carlton	22 years, 314 days	1	1	0	Previously played for Melbourne.
Trent Hoppner	Carlton	19 years, 80 days	7	1	0	
Chris Tarrant	Collingwood	17 years, 205 days	3	196	307	2001, 2002, 2003, 2004 and 2005 Collingwood Leading Goalkicker, 2003 All-Australian, 2003 AFL Mark of the Year. Brother of Robbie Tarrant.
Ben Kinnear	Collingwood	19 years, 87 days	9	50	11	
James Wasley	Collingwood	18 years, 336 days	13	23	3	
Clinton King	Collingwood	20 years, 103 days	15	22	9	Previously played for Sydney.
Frank Raso	Collingwood	18 years, 179 days	1	19	1	
Brent Tuckey	Collingwood	18 years, 332 days	17	19	8	
Jamie Tape	Collingwood	23 years, 363 days	2	16	1	Previously played for Richmond.
Michael Gardiner	Collingwood	20 years, 155 days	21	7	1	
Andrew Pugsley	Collingwood	19 years, 262 days	4	5	2	
Shannon Gibson	Collingwood	22 years, 141 days	1	3	0	Previously played for Hawthorn.
Stuart Mangin	Collingwood	23 years, 150 days	13	3	2	
Dean Solomon	Essendon	18 years, 107 days	5	158	56	1999 Rising Star nominee (Round 11).
Mark Bolton	Essendon	18 years, 360 days	1	124	50	
Simon Eastaugh	Essendon	24 years, 305 days	3	17	1	
Judd Lalich	Essendon	22 years, 175 days	13	17	4	
James Walker	Fremantle	19 years, 206 days	19	151	16	
Adrian Fletcher	Fremantle	28 years, 170 days	1	79	24	1999 Fremantle Best and Fairest. Previously played for Geelong, St Kilda, Brisbane Bears and Brisbane Lions.
Brad Dodd	Fremantle	21 years, 6 days	1	50	24	
Clem Michael	Fremantle	21 years, 256 days	1	43	11	Son of Stephen Michael.
Chris Bond	Fremantle	29 years, 62 days	1	41	5	Previously played for Carlton and Richmond.
Brodie Holland	Fremantle	18 years, 134 days	8	36	21	
Stuart Anderson	Fremantle	23 years, 282 days	2	9	3	Previously played for North Melbourne.
Paul Maher	Fremantle	22 years, 24 days	15	5	5	
Daniel Hargraves	Fremantle	22 years, 285 days	4	3	0	Previously played for Western Bulldogs.
Brendon Feddema	Fremantle	23 years, 359 days	7	3	0	
Matthew Scarlett	Geelong	19 years, 86 days	22	284	17	2003 Best and Fairest, 2003, 2004, 2007, 2008, 2009 and 2011 All-Australian and 2000 Rising Star nominee (Round 18).
James Rahilly	Geelong	18 years, 321 days	6	90	11	1998 Rising Star nominee (Round 12).
Brett Spinks	Geelong	24 years, 141 days	1	19	35	1998 Geelong Leading Goalkicker. Previously played for West Coast.
Hamish Simpson	Geelong	22 years, 100 days	5	18	0	
Tim Finocchiaro	Geelong	18 years, 289 days	2	10	1	
Justin Wood	Geelong	18 years, 156 days	9	7	5	
Marc Woolnough	Geelong	18 years, 31 days	13	6	1	Son of Michael Woolnough.
Joel McKay	Geelong	19 years, 31 days	21	4	0	
Leigh Brockman	Geelong	19 years, 339 days	14	2	1	
Trent Croad	Hawthorn	18 years, 19 days	1	184	129	2005 All-Australian team, 1998 Rising Star nominee.
Richie Vandenberg	Hawthorn	21 years, 198 days	17	145	64	Hawthorn captain 2005-2007.
Nathan Thompson	Hawthorn	20 years, 50 days	2	119	92	2003 and 2004 Hawthorn Leading Goalkicker. 1999 Rising Star nominee (Round 14).
John Barker	Hawthorn	23 years, 37 days	1	113	114	2001 Hawthorn Leading Goalkicker. Previously played for Fitzroy and Brisbane.
Chris Obst	Hawthorn	18 years, 289 days	17	17	0	
Nathan Chapman	Hawthorn	22 years, 325 days	1	16	4	Previously played for Brisbane Bears and Brisbane Lions.
Brad Lloyd	Hawthorn	22 years, 200 days	2	11	3	Brother of Matthew Lloyd.
Haydon Kilmartin	Hawthorn	24 years, 263 days	3	10	1	
Nathan Turvey	Hawthorn	20 years, 190 days	5	10	0	
Matthew Dennis	Hawthorn	20 years, 145 days	15	5	0	
Jeff White	Melbourne	21 years, 38 days	1	236	95	All Australian 2004 and Melbourne Best and Fairest 2004. Previously played for Fremantle.
Travis Johnstone	Melbourne	17 years, 255 days	1	160	111	Grandson of Norm Johnstone.
Nathan Brown	Melbourne	21 years, 248 days	4	146	36	
Daniel Ward	Melbourne	20 years, 326 days	10	136	31	
Guy Rigoni	Melbourne	23 years, 245 days	1	107	35	
Jamie Shanahan	Melbourne	30 years, 113 days	1	37	0	Previously played for St Kilda.
Matthew Collins	Melbourne	21 years, 187 days	19	29	5	Previously played for Adelaide.
Matthew Bishop	Melbourne	22 years, 289 days	5	18	4	
Craig Smoker	Melbourne	19 years, 359 days	1	17	12	
Troy Longmuir	Melbourne	18 years, 363 days	9	17	3	1999 Rising Star nominee (Round 4). Brother of Justin Longmuir.
Mark Bradly	Melbourne	21 years, 128 days	10	4	3	
Hayden Lamaro	Melbourne	19 years, 177 days	1	2	0	
Shannon Grant	North Melbourne	20 years, 342 days	1	243	323	1999 Norm Smith Medallist, 2001 North Melbourne Best and Fairest and 2005 All Australian. Previously played for Sydney.
Shannon Watt	North Melbourne	17 years, 212 days	14	155	9	
Jason McCartney	North Melbourne	24 years, 13 days	1	107	15	Previously played for Adelaide and Collingwood.
Winston Abraham	North Melbourne	23 years, 179 days	1	72	104	1998 AFL Mark of the Year. Previously played for Fremantle.
Stuart Cochrane	North Melbourne	19 years, 287 days	6	50	11	
Brady Anderson	North Melbourne	22 years, 288 days	1	27	2	1997 Sandover Medallist.
Dion Miles	North Melbourne	19 years, 303 days	11	2	1	
Nick Stevens	Port Adelaide	18 years, 120 days	6	127	78	1998 Rising Star nominee (Round 9).
Mark Harwood	Port Adelaide	20 years, 53 days	10	30	19	Previously played for West Coast.
Matthew Bode	Port Adelaide	18 years, 273 days	1	29	25	1999 Rising Star nominee (Round 19).
Brett Chalmers	Port Adelaide	25 years, 23 days	8	25	12	Previously played for Adelaide.
Danny Morton	Port Adelaide	24 years, 271 days	1	20	17	Previously played for Fitzroy.
Chris Naish	Port Adelaide	26 years, 183 days	1	18	16	Previously played for Richmond.
Paul Evans	Port Adelaide	19 years, 124 days	6	6	5	
Tom Harley	Port Adelaide	19 years, 344 days	14	1	1	
Greg Tivendale	Richmond	19 years, 120 days	20	188	125	
Andrew Kellaway	Richmond	22 years, 168 days	7	172	30	2000 Jack Dyer Medallist and 2000 All-Australian.
Brad Ottens	Richmond	18 years, 64 days	1	129	152	2001 All-Australian.
Aaron James	Richmond	21 years, 162 days	3	30	19	Previously played for Collingwood.
Lionel Proctor	Richmond	18 years, 155 days	6	20	4	
Steven McKee	Richmond	19 years, 331 days	8	20	1	
Justin Plapp	Richmond	21 years, 5 days	14	18	22	1998 Rising Star nominee (Round 15).
Ashley Blurton	Richmond	23 years, 24 days	1	14	7	Previously played for West Coast.
John Rombotis	Richmond	21 years, 180 days	3	13	2	Previously played for Fitzroy and Port Adelaide.
Gavin Mitchell	St Kilda	25 years, 90 days	1	52	64	Previously played for Fremantle.
Tim Elliott	St Kilda	21 years, 252 days	9	47	10	
Brett Knowles	St Kilda	19 years, 334 days	3	43	8	
Ben Thompson	St Kilda	24 years, 241 days	6	11	2	
Sam Cranage	St Kilda	19 years, 104 days	19	8	1	
Jared Crouch	Sydney	20 years, 65 days	7	223	51	1998 Rising Star nominee (Round 17).
Jason Saddington	Sydney	18 years, 157 days	1	142	41	1998 Rising Star nominee (Round 11).
Wayne Schwass	Sydney	29 years, 128 days	2	98	57	1999 Sydney Best and Fairest and 1999 All-Australian. Previously played for North Melbourne.
Robert Ahmat	Sydney	20 years, 253 days	1	42	46	Previously played for Collingwood.
Brett O'Farrell	Sydney	20 years, 170 days	13	8	9	
Brent Green	Sydney	22 years, 14 days	3	7	8	Previously played for Brisbane Bears and Brisbane Lions.
Rowan Jones	West Coast	18 years, 263 days	19	158	70	1999 Rising Star nominee (Round 8).
Andrew Williams	West Coast	19 years, 126 days	15	84	42	1999 Rising star nominee (Round 11).
Phillip Read	West Coast	18 years, 158 days	1	74	124	
Jaxon Crabb	West Coast	18 years, 168 days	5	15	2	2005 Sandover Medallist.
Todd Holmes	West Coast	18 years, 284 days	5	7	0	
Simon Garlick	Western Bulldogs	22 years, 352 days	1	137	114	Previously played for Sydney.
Mark Alvey	Western Bulldogs	17 years, 353 days	10	45	28	
Paul Dooley	Western Bulldogs	22 years, 176 days	1	14	2	
