= 1997 AFL draft =

Draft for the Australian Football League

The 1997 AFL draft was held at the conclusion of the 1997 Australian Football League (AFL) season. A Pre-season Draft and the second Rookie Draft were held prior to the 1998 season.

It is considered to have been one of the most successful drafts ever, with the top 11 selections each playing over 100 games of AFL football. Other significant selections include Brownlow Medalists Simon Black at 31 and Adam Goodes at 43, as well as future Hawthorn captain Richie Vandenberg and Port Adelaide and Carlton star Nick Stevens. Black and Goodes played in seven Grand Finals between them from 2001 to 2012, Black winning three and Goodes winning two. Another notable player from this draft was Matthew Scarlett, who played a pivotal role in Geelong's 2007, 2009 and 2011 premierships.

The Melbourne Demons received the first two picks in the draft: one for finishing bottom of the ladder and a Priority Pick for winning just 4 games. Melbourne traded pick no.2 to Fremantle in exchange for Jeff White. Fremantle traded this pick to Richmond in exchange for Chris Bond.

In total, there were 86 picks to be drafted between the 16 competing teams.

== 1997 national draft ==
Pick	Player	Recruited from	Club
1	Travis Johnstone	Dandenong Stingrays	Melbourne
2	Brad Ottens	Glenelg	Richmond
3	Trent Croad	Dandenong Stingrays	Hawthorn
4	Mark Bolton	Eastern Ranges	Essendon
5	Luke Power	Oakleigh Chargers	Brisbane Lions
6	James Walker	North Ballarat Rebels	Fremantle
7	Kris Massie	Dandenong Stingrays	Carlton
8	Chris Tarrant	Bendigo Pioneers	Collingwood
9	Chad Cornes	Glenelg	Port Adelaide
10	Shane O'Bree	North Ballarat Rebels	Brisbane Lions
11	Jason Saddington	Eastern Ranges	Sydney Swans
12	Jaxon Crabb	Claremont	West Coast Eagles
13	Callum Chambers	Gippsland Power	West Coast Eagles
14	Shannon Watt	North Ballarat Rebels	North Melbourne
15	Joel McKay	Murray Bushrangers	Geelong
16	Ben Walton	Central District	St Kilda
17	Lance Picioane	Western Jets	Adelaide
18	Mark Alvey	Bendigo Pioneers	Western Bulldogs
19	Chris Obst	Western Jets	Hawthorn
20	Dean Solomon	Bendigo Pioneers	Essendon
21	Clem Michael	South Fremantle	Fremantle
22	Troy Longmuir	West Perth	Melbourne
23	Adam Chatfield	NSW/ACT Rams	Carlton
24	James Wasley	Norwood	Collingwood
25	Nick Stevens	Preston Knights	Port Adelaide
26	Brodie Holland	Tassie Mariners	Fremantle
27	Brad Stephens	Murray Bushrangers	North Melbourne
28	Rowan Jones	Claremont	West Coast Eagles
29	Marc Woolnough	Southport	Geelong
30	Paul McMahon	Bendigo Pioneers	North Melbourne
31	Simon Black	East Fremantle	Brisbane Lions
32	Troy Johnson	South Fremantle	Fremantle
33	James Thiessen	Norwood	Adelaide
34	Andrew Williams	Dandenong Stingrays	West Coast Eagles
35	Marcus Baldwin	Calder Cannons	Hawthorn
36	Judd Lalich	East Perth	Essendon
37	Todd Holmes	Subiaco	West Coast Eagles
38	James Rahilly	Geelong Falcons	Geelong
39	Matthew Blake	Bendigo Pioneers	Melbourne
40	Fred Campbell	Bendigo Pioneers	Sydney Swans
41	Danny Morton	North Adelaide	Port Adelaide
42	Matthew Dennis	Old Brighton	Hawthorn
43	Adam Goodes	North Ballarat Rebels	Sydney Swans
44	David Antonowicz	Western Jets	West Coast Eagles
45	Matthew Scarlett	Geelong Falcons	Geelong
46	Joshua Robertson	Murray Bushrangers	North Melbourne
47	Robert Stevenson	Essendon	Western Bulldogs
48	Ben Thompson	Glenelg	St Kilda
49	Ian Perrie	East Perth	Adelaide
50	Luke Ottens	Glenelg	Melbourne
51	Scott Ralph	Morningside	Brisbane Lions
52	Jordan Doering	Bendigo Pioneers	Essendon
53	Lionel Proctor	Preston Knights	Richmond
54	Justin Wood	Tassie Mariners	Geelong
55	Craig Black	Dandenong Stingrays	Carlton
56	Ben Kinnear	Central District	Collingwood
57	Darren Fraser	Essendon	Port Adelaide
58	Marcus Picken	North Ballarat Rebels	Brisbane Lions
59	Brett Rose	Eastern Ranges	Sydney Swans
60	Phillip Read	East Fremantle	West Coast Eagles
61	Tim Finocchiaro	Eastern Ranges	Geelong
62	Dion Miles	North Melbourne	North Melbourne
63	Anthony Aloi	Western Jets	Western Bulldogs
64	Sam Cranage	North Ballarat Rebels	St Kilda
65	Linden Stevens	Sturt	Adelaide
66	Nathan Brown	West Adelaide	Melbourne
67	Brad Lloyd	Hawthorn	Hawthorn
68	Simon Eastaugh	Norwood	Essendon
69	Paul Greenham	Port Melbourne	Richmond
70	Trent Hoppner	Preston Knights	Carlton
71	Andrew Kellaway	Richmond	Richmond
72	Pass		Port Adelaide
73	Beau McDonald	Swan Districts	Brisbane Lions
74	Paul Digiovine	Oakleigh Chargers	Western Bulldogs
75	Brent Cowell	Gippsland Power	St Kilda
76	Pass		Adelaide
77	Guy Rigoni	Myrtleford	Melbourne
78	Richie Vandenberg	University Blues	Hawthorn
79	Pass		Richmond
80	John Hynes	Prahran Dragons	Carlton
81	Troy Kirwen	Preston Knights	Collingwood
82	Nathan Thompson	Bendigo Pioneers	Hawthorn
83	Ben Thompson	Northern Eagles	Carlton
84	Frankie Raso	Preston Knights	Collingwood
85	Hayden Burgiel	Gippsland Power	Hawthorn
86	Scott Whiston	Central District	Collingwood

== 1998 pre-season draft ==
Pick	Player	Recruited from	Club
1	Jamie Shanahan	St Kilda	Melbourne
2	Joel Smith	St Kilda	Hawthorn
3	Matthew Bode	Glenelg Football Club	Port Adelaide
4	Adam Coughlan	Sandringham Zebras	Sydney Swans
5	Damian Houlihan	Tatura Football Club	North Melbourne
6	Scott Taylor	Western Bulldogs	Western Bulldogs
7	Matthew Carr	East Fremantle Football Club	St Kilda
8	Pass		Adelaide Crows
9	Jason Daniltchenko	North Melbourne	Hawthorn
10	Brady Anderson	East Perth Football Club	North Melbourne
11	Jamie Elliott	St Kilda	St Kilda
12	Haydon Kilmartin	East Fremantle Football Club	Hawthorn
13	Pass		St Kilda
14	Pass		Hawthorn

== 1998 rookie draft ==
Round	Pick	Player	Recruited from	Club
1	1	Luke Williams	Oakleigh Chargers	Melbourne
1	2	Stephen Jurica	Richmond	Hawthorn
1	3	Dean Rioli	South Fremantle	Essendon
1	4	Chris Bossong	St Kevins Old Boys	Richmond
1	5	Brad Dodd	East Fremantle	Fremantle
1	6	Simon Fletcher	Geelong	Carlton
1	7	George Bakoulas	Calder Cannons	Collingwood
1	8	Barnaby French	Sturt	Port Adelaide
1	9	Passed	N/A	Brisbane Lions
1	10	Mark Brown	Numurkah	Sydney
1	11	Conrad Chambers	East Fremantle	West Coast
1	12	Paul Lindsay	East Fremantle	Geelong
1	13	David Round	Western Bulldogs	North Melbourne
1	14	Lincoln Reynolds	Geelong Falcons	Western Bulldogs
1	15	Lachlan Brown	St Kilda (reserves)	St Kilda
1	16	Ben Marsh	West Adelaide	Adelaide
2	17	Jamie Cann	Calder Cannons	Melbourne
2	18	Glen Bowyer	Murray Bushrangers	Hawthorn
2	19	Winis Imbi	North Ballarat Rebels	Essendon
2	20	Greg Tivendale	Gippsland Power	Richmond
2	21	Paul Maher	Perth	Fremantle
2	22	Damian Lang	Port Adelaide	Carlton
2	23	Mark Matthews	Box Hill	Collingwood
2	24	Passed	N/A	Hawthorn
2	25	Anthony Sheehan	Port Adelaide	Port Adelaide
2	26	Jac Crow	Maribyrnong Sports Academy	Melbourne
2	27	Brad McMahon	Southport	Sydney
2	28	Chad Fletcher	Subiaco	West Coast
2	29	Chris Hemley	St Kilda	Geelong
2	30	Craig Folino	Eastern Ranges	North Melbourne
2	31	Shaun Tinsley	Port Melbourne	Western Bulldogs
2	32	Passed	N/A	St Kilda
2	33	Tim Davis	North Adelaide	Adelaide
3	34	Ben Beams	Glenorchy	Melbourne
3	35	Robert Di Rosa	Western Bulldogs	Essendon
3	36	Ben Hollands	North Albury	Richmond
3	37	Cameron Jackson	Central U18	Fremantle
3	38	Scott Freeborn	Port Adelaide	Carlton
3	39	Tarkyn Lockyer	East Fremantle	Collingwood
3	40	Passed	N/A	Port Adelaide
3	41	Passed	N/A	Brisbane Lions
3	42	Jason McPherson	Ganmain-Grong Grong-Matong	Sydney
3	43	Laurie Bellotti	Claremont	West Coast
3	44	Shaun Baxter	Western Bulldogs	Geelong
3	45	Julian Kirzner	North Melbourne	North Melbourne
3	45	Passed	N/A	Western Bulldogs
3	47	Passed	N/A	St Kilda
3	48	Sudjai Cook	Norwood	Adelaide
4	49	Peter Walsh	West Adelaide	Melbourne
4	50	Passed	N/A	Hawthorn
4	51	Lachlan Oakley	Sandringham	Essendon
4	52	Passed	N/A	Richmond
4	53	John Neesham	East Fremantle	Fremantle
4	54	Shane Flynn	Carlton (reserves)	Carlton
4	55	Adam Collings	East Fremantle	Collingwood
4	56	Passed	N/A	Port Adelaide
4	57	Passed	N/A	Brisbane Lions
4	58	Passed	N/A	Sydney
4	59	Heath Younie	Murray Bushrangers	West Coast
4	60	Passed	N/A	Geelong
4	61	Wade Kingsley	Kangaroos	Kangaroos
4	62	Passed	N/A	Western Bulldogs
4	63	Passed	N/A	St Kilda
4	64	Steven Hall	Woodville-West Torrens	Adelaide
4	65	Matthew Bishop	Melbourne (reserves)	Melbourne
5	66	Passed	N/A	Hawthorn
5	67	Mark Johnson	Essendon	Essendon
5	68	Passed	N/A	Richmond
5	69	Passed	N/A	Fremantle
5	70	Cameron Blight	Tassie Mariners	Sydney
5	71	Frankie Dimmatina	Oakleigh Chargers	Collingwood
5	72	Passed	N/A	Port Adelaide
5	73	Passed	N/A	Brisbane Lions
5	74	James Byrne	Sydney (reserves)	Sydney
5	75	Todd Nener	West Coast (reserves)	West Coast
5	76	Passed	N/A	Geelong
5	77	Passed	N/A	Kangaroos
5	78	Passed	N/A	Western Bulldogs
5	79	Passed	N/A	St Kilda
5	80	Passed	N/A	Adelaide
6	81	Daniel Ward	Melbourne (reserves)	Melbourne
6	82	Passed	N/A	Hawthorn
6	83	Passed	N/A	Essendon
6	84	Passed	N/A	Richmond
6	85	Passed	N/A	Fremantle
6	86	Clint Evans	Dandenong Stingrays	Carlton
6	87	Marcus Barham	Collingwood	Collingwood
6	88	Passed	N/A	Port Adelaide
6	89	Tate Day	Gold Coast	Brisbane Lions
6	90	Mark Livy	NSW/ACT Rams	Sydney
6	91	Trent Simpson	West Coast (reserves)	West Coast
6	92	Passed	N/A	Geelong
6	93	Passed	N/A	Kangaroos
6	94	Passed	N/A	Western Bulldogs
6	95	Passed	N/A	St Kilda
6	96	Passed	N/A	Adelaide
