= Matthew Dennis =

Matthew Dennis may refer to:

- Matthew Dennis (Australian footballer)
- Matthew Dennis (English footballer)
- Matt Dennis, American singer, pianist and composer
