= Luke Ottens =

Australian rules footballer (born 1976)

Personal information
- Full name: Luke Ottens
- Born: 22 May 1976 (age 50)
- Original team: Glenelg
- Draft: 50th overall, 1997 AFL draft
- Height: 194 cm (6 ft 4 in)
- Weight: 96 kg (212 lb)
- Position: Defender

Playing career^{1}
Years	Club	Games (Goals)
1998–2000	Melbourne	4 (0)
- ^{1} Playing statistics correct to the end of 2000.

Luke Ottens (born 22 May 1976) is a former Australian rules footballer who played with the Melbourne Football Club in the Australian Football League (AFL). He is the elder brother of All-Australian and premiership player, Brad Ottens, and the son of Dean Ottens.

== Early life ==
He is the son of Dean Ottens, who was a talented ruckman for Sturt in the South Australian National Football League (SANFL). Dean played 116 games, won two premierships and representing South Australia seven times. Born on 22 May 1976, Luke grew up in a footballing family. His brother, Brad, had a successful AFL career, winning three premierships with Geelong. Brad claims his earliest memory is "playing in the backyard with [Luke]".

Ottens began his career with Glenelg, playing in the SANFL. He was drafted in the inaugural rookie draft in 1997 by Port Adelaide, but he failed to play a game for Port, instead continuing to play for Glenelg.

== AFL career ==
Ottens was drafted to the Melbourne Football Club with the 50th selection in the 1997 AFL draft, the same draft in which his brother, Brad, was drafted by Richmond with the second selection. He injured his groin the December after he was drafted, requiring surgery. Ottens made his debut for Melbourne's reserves in April 1998. Ottens was hampered by groin problems for the remainder of 1998 and did not manage to break into the senior team, playing all his matches in the reserves.

Ottens made his AFL debut in the first round of the 1999 season, playing against his brother, Brad, who was playing in his 13th match. Although a key-position defender, Ottens also played as Melbourne's backup ruckman, occasionally rucking directly against his brother during the match. He was, however, "dominated" by his younger, but substantially taller, brother in these encounters. In his third game, Ottens, along with fellow youngster Troy Longmuir, were praised for their "enthusiasm" in a game the Demons narrowly lost. Ottens was dropped from the team for Melbourne's round 5 match and he never made his way back into the Melbourne senior team in a career that was crippled by injury, causing the round 4 game to be his last AFL match.

In May 1999, Ottens the medial ligament in his knee while playing in the reserves, sidelining him for six weeks. In round 13 of the 1999 season, Ottens injured his left knee, requiring a knee reconstruction, which ruled him out for the remainder of the 1999 season and half of the 2000 season. After successfully returning from injury in round 15 of 2000, Ottens then injured his right knee only four games later, again requiring a knee reconstruction. Due to his horrendous run with injuries, Ottens was delisted by the Demons at the end of the 2000 season.

After being delisted, Ottens went back to his original team, Glenelg, and played for the Tigers from 2001 to 2002.

Luke finished his career playing for the Encounter Bay Football Club in 2003–04.
