= Justin Wood =

Justin Wood may refer to:

- Justin Wood (footballer)
- Justin Wood (politician)
