= Danylchenko =

Danylchenko (Ukrainian: Данильченко), also transliterated as Danilchenko or Daniltchenko, is a Ukrainian surname. Notable people with the surname include:

- Galina Danilchenko (born 1964), Ukrainian accountant and politician
- Jason Daniltchenko (born 1975), Australian rules footballer
- Pavel Georgiyevich Daniltshenko (1903–1993), Russian ichthyologist and paleontologist
- Serhiy Danylchenko (born 1974), Ukrainian boxer
- Vitaliy Danylchenko (born 1978), Ukrainian figure skater
