= Ben Walton =

Australian rules footballer

Personal information
- Full name: Ben Walton
- Born: 12 November 1979 (age 46)
- Original team: Central District
- Draft: 16th, 1997 National Draft
- Height: 187 cm (6 ft 2 in)
- Weight: 88 kg (194 lb)

Playing career^{1}
Years	Club	Games (Goals)
1999–2001	St Kilda	23 (15)
- ^{1} Playing statistics correct to the end of 2001.

Ben Walton (born 12 November 1979) is a former Australian rules footballer who played with St Kilda in the Australian Football League (AFL).

Walton played his early football at Trinity College (Gawler) and Central District, prior to being selected by St Kilda with pick 16 of the 1997 National Draft. He didn't play senior football in 1998 but made 18 league appearances in the 1999 AFL season, as a utility player. Over the next two seasons he added just five more games to his tally and was delisted.

He returned to Central District after his AFL career ended and in 2004 he began playing for another SANFL club, North Adelaide.
