= Mark Johnson (footballer) =

Australian rules footballer, born 1978

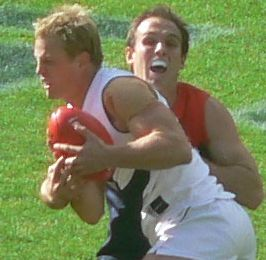
- Mark Johnson while playing in his final season with Fremantle

Personal information
- Full name: Mark Eugene Johnson
- Born: 23 May 1978 (age 48)
- Original team: Diggers Rest /Sunbury /Calder U18
- Height: 180 cm (5 ft 11 in)
- Weight: 80 kg (176 lb)

Playing career^{1}
Years	Club	Games (Goals)
1999–2007	Essendon	194 (92)
2008	Fremantle	14 (8)
Total		208 (100)
- ^{1} Playing statistics correct to the end of 2008.

Career highlights
- AFL premiership player: 2000; W.S. Crichton Medal: 2002; AFL Rising Star nominee: 1999

Mark 'MJ' Johnson (born 23 May 1978) is a former professional Australian rules footballer who played for the Essendon Football Club and Fremantle Football Club in the Australian Football League (AFL).

== Early life ==
Johnson is commonly known as "Mr. Sunbury", referring to the body building award he won as a teenager in his home town of Sunbury, Victoria.

Mark commenced his junior football with Diggers Rest Football Club, before moving to Sunbury Lions.

He was drafted to Essendon as a rookie after playing underage with the Calder Cannons in the TAC Cup competition.

== AFL career ==
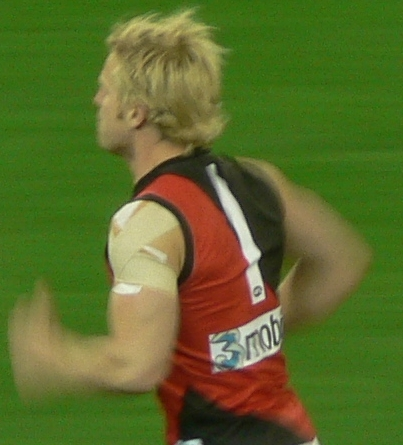
Playing for Essendon during the 2007 AFL Season

Johnson was elevated from the Essendon rookie list in 1998, playing his first game in 1999. He was part of the 2000 premiership side, and won the W.S. Crichton Medal in 2002.

Known for his toughness, Johnson was part of the midfield duo known as the "Johnson Boys" at Essendon, the other member being Jason Johnson. The two are not related; however, Mark did have a brother who played in the AFL for Geelong: David Johnson.

Sometimes his height and strength were underestimated by opposition players. He played every match in 2006 and was one of just three Essendon players to do so; the others were Brent Stanton and Scott Lucas.

On 15 October 2007, Essendon announced that 29-year-old Johnson was to be delisted by the club, giving him the option of nominating for the national draft. The decision to delist Johnson was unpopular to many Essendon fans who enjoyed Johnson's hard-at-it attitude to footy.

In November 2007, Mark was training with a rival club, the Kangaroos. In the 2007 AFL draft, however, he was drafted to a West Australian club, Fremantle, where he was reunited with former Essendon teammates Dean Solomon, who was traded by Essendon in 2006 alongside Kepler Bradley, also delisted by the club at the end of the 2007 season, and former player and assistant coach Mark Harvey, who had just been appointed Fremantle coach.

Johnson brought up his 200th AFL game in round 14, coincidentally against his former side, Essendon, at Domain Stadium. His old club triumphed by four points. He later sustained a career-ending shoulder injury and played his last game in round 22 against Collingwood, which Fremantle won by 24 points.

He later sought compensation from the Dockers for his injury.

== Playing statistics ==
Season	Team	No.	Games	Totals							Averages (per game)						
Season	Team	No.	Games	G	B	K	H	D	M	T	G	B	K	H	D	M	T
1999	Essendon	28	15	2	1	131	79	210	47	20	0.1	0.1	8.7	5.3	14.0	3.1	1.3
2000	Essendon	1	24	5	4	269	124	393	102	39	0.2	0.2	11.2	5.2	16.4	4.3	1.6
2001	Essendon	1	23	10	2	250	89	339	84	48	0.4	0.1	10.9	3.9	14.7	3.7	2.1
2002	Essendon	1	24	5	2	247	142	389	109	78	0.2	0.1	10.3	5.9	16.2	4.5	3.3
2003	Essendon	1	24	8	4	257	165	422	107	98	0.3	0.2	10.7	6.9	17.6	4.5	4.1
2004	Essendon	1	20	17	11	162	117	279	54	57	0.9	0.6	8.1	5.9	14.0	2.7	2.9
2005	Essendon	1	22	29	12	265	133	398	106	84	1.3	0.5	12.0	6.0	18.1	4.8	3.8
2006	Essendon	1	22	9	4	212	146	358	99	64	0.4	0.2	9.6	6.6	16.3	4.5	2.9
2007	Essendon	1	20	7	3	180	131	311	98	49	0.4	0.2	9.0	6.6	15.6	4.9	2.5
2008	Fremantle	17	14	8	3	88	60	148	35	31	0.6	0.2	6.3	4.3	10.6	2.5	2.2
Career			208	100	46	2061	1186	3247	841	568	0.5	0.2	9.9	5.7	15.6	4.0	2.7
