= Marc Dragicevic =

Australian rules footballer

Personal information
- Born: 30 March 1981 (age 45)
- Original team: Geelong Falcons
- Debut: Richmond
- Height: 180 cm (5 ft 11 in)
- Weight: 76 kg (168 lb)

Playing career^{1}
Years	Club	Games (Goals)
1999–2004	Richmond	48 (24)
- ^{1} Playing statistics correct to the end of 2004.

Career highlights
- AFL Rising Star nominee: 1999

Marc Dragicevic (born 30 March 1981) is an Australian rules footballer who played for Richmond Football Club in the Australian Football League (AFL).

Originally from North Geelong, Dragicevic played for Geelong Falcons before being drafted by Richmond.

A small midfielder, Dragicevic underwent a knee reconstruction in early 2001 which put him out of Richmond's advance to the finals, followed by a second reconstruction. He played five more games before being delisted at the end of the 2004 season.

Following his delisting, Dragicevic signed for St Albans Football Club in the Geelong Football League.
