= Scott Taylor (Australian footballer) =

Australian rules footballer

Personal information
- Full name: Scott Taylor
- Born: 22 October 1976 (age 50)
- Original teams: Geelong Falcons, (TAC Cup)
- Draft: No. 66, 1994 AFL draft

Playing career^{1}
Years	Club	Games (Goals)
1996	Footscray	1 (0)
- ^{1} Playing statistics correct to the end of 1996.

Scott Taylor (born 22 October 1976) is a former Australian rules footballer who played one game for Footscray in the Australian Football League (AFL) in 1996. He was recruited from the Geelong Falcons in the TAC Cup with the 66th selection in the 1994 AFL draft.

He broke his foot in his debut AFL game in 1996. He was delisted at the end of the 1997 season to allow for the rookie elevation of Adam Contessa, but was re-drafted in the 1998 Pre-season Draft. However he was again delisted at the end of the 1998 season, without playing any more games in the AFL.
