= Ben Thompson (Australian footballer, born 1973) =

Australian rules footballer

Personal information
- Full name: Ben W. Thompson
- Born: 4 September 1973 (age 53)
- Original team: Glenelg
- Draft: No. 48, 1997 National Draft
- Height: 190 cm (6 ft 3 in)
- Weight: 95 kg (209 lb)

Playing career^{1}
Years	Club	Games (Goals)
1998–1999	St Kilda	11 (2)
- ^{1} Playing statistics correct to the end of 1999.

Ben Thompson (born 4 September 1973) is a former Australian rules footballer who played with St Kilda in the Australian Football League (AFL).

Thompson had a late start to his career, not beginning at Glenelg until 1996. He won their best and fairest award that year and after another season was selected by St Kilda in the 1997 National Draft, with pick 48. A defender, he made 11 appearances for St. Kilda, over two seasons, then returned to Glenelg.
