= Robbie Tarrant =

Australian rules footballer

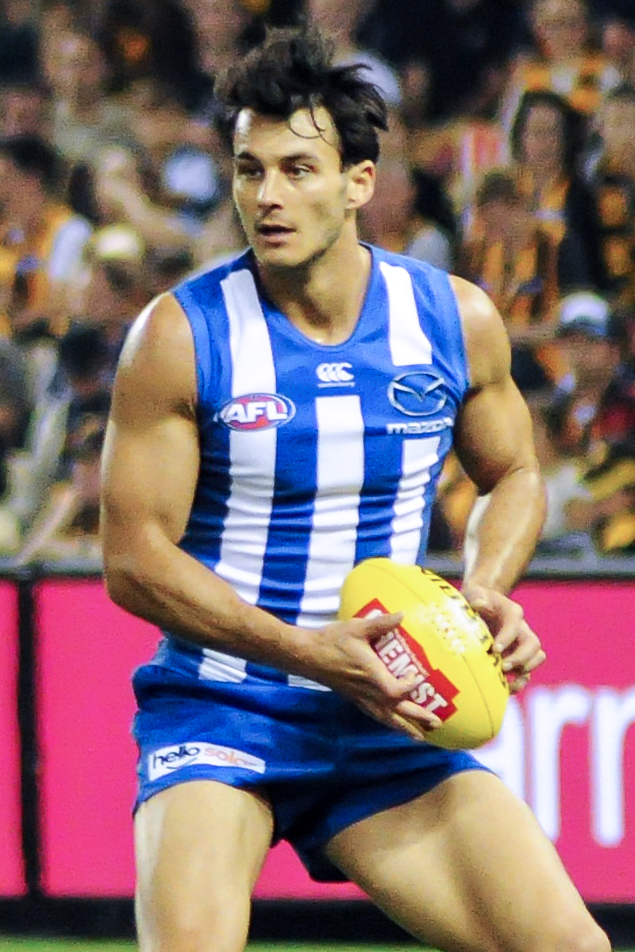
- Tarrant playing for North Melbourne in April 2018

Personal information
- Full name: Robbie Tarrant
- Born: 25 April 1989 (age 37); Mildura, Victoria
- Original team: South Mildura (Vic)/Bendigo Pioneers/Xavier College
- Draft: No. 15, 2007 national draft
- Height: 196 cm (6 ft 5 in)
- Weight: 96 kg (212 lb)
- Position: Key defender

Playing career^{1}
Years	Club	Games (Goals)
2008–2021	North Melbourne	174 (44)
2022–2023	Richmond	20 (0)
Total		194 (44)

International team honours^{2}
Years	Team	Games (Goals)
2017	Australia	2 (0)
- ^{1} Playing statistics correct to the end of 2023.^{2} Representative statistics correct as of 2020.

Career highlights
- Syd Barker Medal: 2016

Robbie Tarrant (born 25 April 1989) is a former professional Australian rules footballer playing for the Richmond Football Club in the Australian Football League (AFL), having previously played for the North Melbourne Football Club. He is the younger brother of former Collingwood and Fremantle player, Chris Tarrant. Tarrant announced his immediate retirement on 13 July 2023.

== Early career ==
Tarrant was born in Mildura, Victoria and is the younger brother of former Collingwood defender Chris Tarrant. Tarrant originally played for South Mildura in the Sunraysia Football League and moved to Melbourne in 2005. After graduating from Xavier College in 2006, in 2007 he worked as a teller at Bendigo Bank in Bendigo as well as playing for the Bendigo Pioneers.

== AFL career ==
Tarrant was drafted by North Melbourne with their first selection and fifteenth overall in the 2007 national draft. He did not play any senior football in his first two years and he ultimately made his AFL debut in the thirty point loss against Sydney at the Sydney Cricket Ground in round 15, 2010.

Tarrant's 2016 season was rewarded with the Syd Barker Medal as the club best and fairest.

In September 2021, Tarrant declared his intention to exercise his options as a free agent, with media sources reporting that he was set to sign a two-year deal with Richmond. He was ultimately traded on 8 October.

== Retirement ==
Robbie Tarrant announced retirement on Thursday 13 July 2023, after battling with injury.

He played a total of 194 games and kicked 44 goals for both North Melbourne and Richmond.

== Statistics ==
Updated to the end of 2023.

Legend
G	Goals	K	Kicks	D	Disposals	T	Tackles
B	Behinds	H	Handballs	M	Marks

Season	Team	No.	Games	Totals							Averages (per game)							Votes
Season	Team	No.	Games	G	B	K	H	D	M	T	G	B	K	H	D	M	T	Votes
2010	North Melbourne	25	2	0	0	8	7	15	4	3	0.0	0.0	4.0	3.5	7.5	2.0	1.5	0
2011	North Melbourne	25	7	1	1	52	24	76	21	19	0.1	0.1	7.4	3.4	10.9	3.0	2.7	0
2012	North Melbourne	25	16	23	16	112	55	167	57	24	1.4	1.0	7.0	3.4	10.4	3.6	1.5	0
2013	North Melbourne	25	13	16	15	78	54	132	58	15	1.2	1.2	6.0	4.2	10.2	4.5	1.2	0
2014	North Melbourne	25	1	0	0	1	2	3	1	1	0.0	0.0	1.0	2.0	3.0	1.0	1.0	0
2015	North Melbourne	25	22	1	0	192	126	318	113	35	0.0	0.0	8.7	5.7	14.5	5.1	1.6	0
2016	North Melbourne	25	23	0	1	246	128	374	145	43	0.0	0.0	10.7	5.6	16.3	6.3	1.9	1
2017	North Melbourne	25	21	1	1	229	144	373	131	55	0.0	0.0	10.9	6.9	17.8	6.2	2.6	0
2018	North Melbourne	25	21	1	1	225	115	340	130	35	0.0	0.0	10.7	5.5	16.2	6.2	1.7	2
2019	North Melbourne	25	22	1	0	231	116	347	137	37	0.0	0.0	10.5	5.3	15.8	6.2	1.7	2
2020	North Melbourne	25	16	0	0	178	72	250	68	21	0.0	0.0	11.1	4.5	15.6	4.3	1.3	0
2021	North Melbourne	25	10	0	0	104	41	145	67	10	0.0	0.0	10.4	4.1	14.5	6.7	1.0	0
2022	Richmond	6	20	0	0	115	82	197	89	21	0.0	0.0	5.8	4.1	9.9	4.5	1.1	0
2023	Richmond	6	0	—	—	—	—	—	—	—	—	—	—	—	—	—	—	0
Career			194	44	35	1771	966	2737	1021	319	0.2	0.2	9.1	5.0	14.1	5.3	1.6	5
