= Chris Tarrant (footballer) =

Australian rules footballer, born 1980

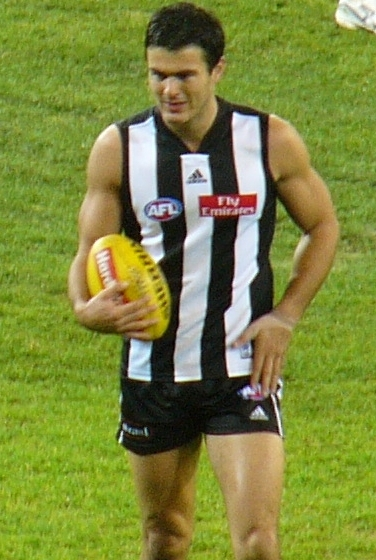
- Tarrant playing for Collingwood in 2006

Personal information
- Full name: Chris Tarrant
- Nicknames: Taz, Tazza
- Born: 18 September 1980 (age 46); Mildura, Victoria
- Original teams: South Mildura, Bendigo Pioneers (TAC Cup)
- Draft: No. 8, 1997 National Draft, Collingwood
- Height: 193 cm (6 ft 4 in)
- Weight: 94 kg (207 lb)
- Position: Defender / Forward

Playing career^{1}
Years	Club	Games (Goals)
1998–2006	Collingwood	161 (299)
2007–2010	Fremantle	72 (60)
2011–2012	Collingwood	35 (8)
Total		268 (367)
- ^{1} Playing statistics correct to the end of 2012.

Career highlights
- All-Australian Team: 2003; 5x Collingwood leading goalkicker: 2001–2005; AFL ANZAC Day Medal: 2001; AFL Mark of the Year: 2003

Chris Tarrant (born 18 September 1980) is a former Australian rules footballer who played for the Collingwood Football Club and the Fremantle Football Club in the Australian Football League (AFL). He announced at the end of the 2010 AFL season that he would return to Melbourne for personal reasons and would not extend his contract with Fremantle for the 2011 season. He returned to the Collingwood Football Club via a trade. He made his name as a key forward, but upon his move to Fremantle in 2007, Tarrant found a new position in the backline. Tarrant was noted for his spectacular high marking, athleticism and pace on a lead.

== Early life ==
Born in Derrimut, Victoria, Tarrant originally played for South Mildura in the Sunraysia Football League and moved to Bendigo in 1996 on an AFL scholarship.

In his younger days he was a top basketballer, making the Victorian State under-15 squad before concentrating on football.

His younger brother Robbie Tarrant played 194 games for North Melbourne and Richmond and retired in 2023.

== AFL career ==
=== Collingwood ===
Tarrant debuted in the AFL in 1998, playing 11 games for the year, half of the possible 22 games for Collingwood, who placed 14th out of 16th on the ladder for the year.

Despite an increase of just two more games for the 1999 season over the prior season, Tarrant more than tripled his disposal count (187) and kicked 5 times more goals (15) for the season.

By the 2000 season, Tarrant's ascendency was clearly evident, playing 19 games and notching up 254 disposals and 28 goals for the season.

In what Tarrant himself claimed as his breakout year, he kicked 53 goals for the year to claim his first Collingwood Leading Goalkicker Award. His contender for the 2001 Mark of the Year was all but assured until Essendon's Gary Moorcroft took what many consider to be the best mark of all time.

Tarrant's 2002 season was the first season he played where Collingwood had more wins than losses (12–8).

His 2003 season was objectively his best for Collingwood, as he was an All-Australian forward, playing all 22 games plus three finals. He kicked a career-best 54 goals and topped Collingwood's goalkicking for the third successive time and won the 2003 Mark of the Year for his high-flying mark against Geelong.

Despite being hampered by knee problems in 2005, Tarrant kicked 36 goals in 17 games to be Collingwood's lead goalkicker for a fifth straight season.

In November 2005, Collingwood coach Mick Malthouse stated that Tarrant had gained strength in his legs after a successful recovery from post-season knee surgery. A big 2006 season was predicted from the enigmatic Tarrant, however this did not eventuate.

Honours bestowed upon Tarrant during his AFL career include All-Australian selection in 2003, Second place in the Collingwood Best & Fairest award (Copeland Trophy) in 2003, Club Leading Goalkicker in 2001, 2002 (equal), 2003, 2004, 2005, and Mark Of The Year in 2003.

=== Fremantle ===
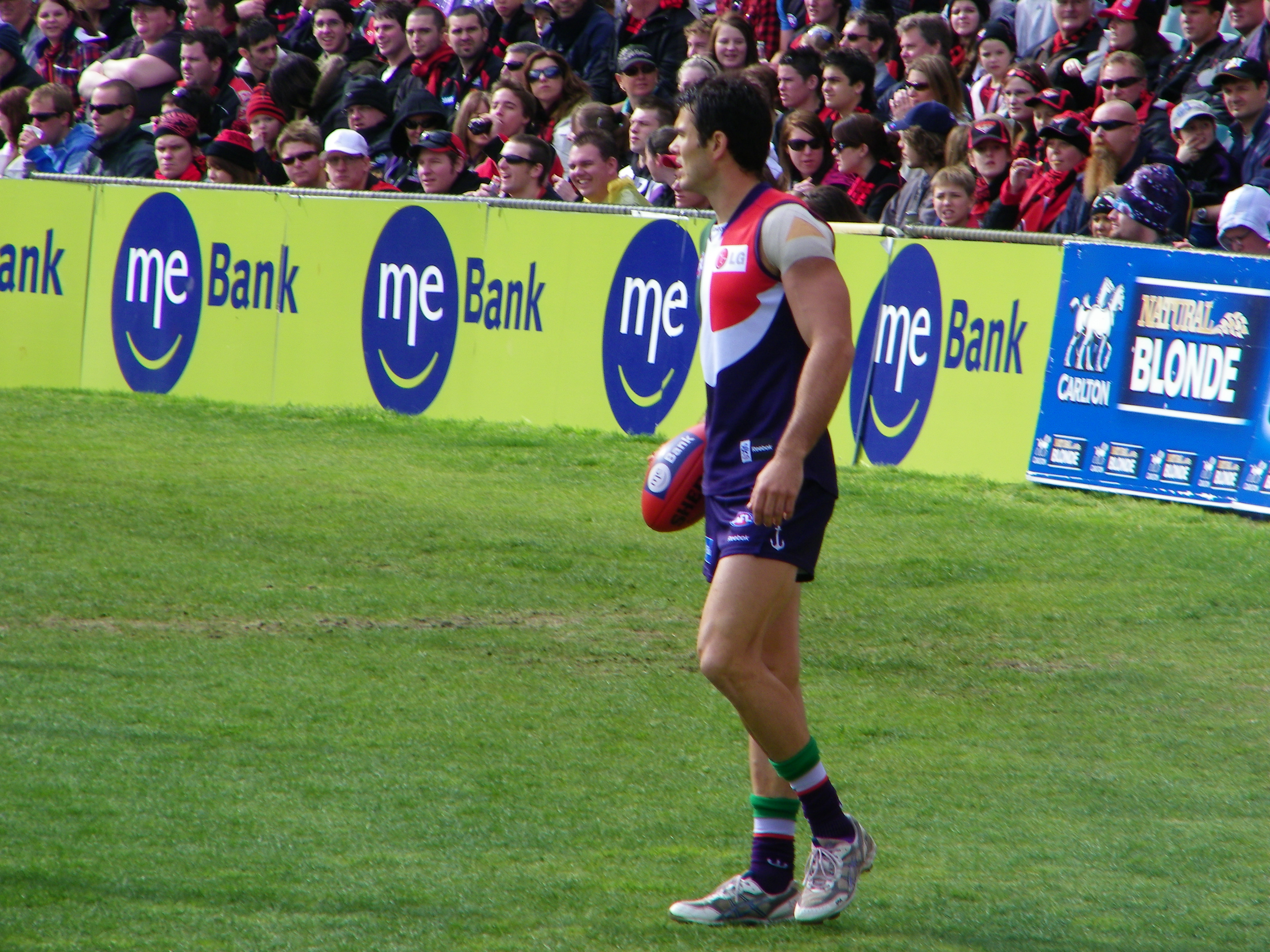
Chris Tarrant playing with Fremantle in 2009.

On 13 October 2006, the final day of trade week and after being linked with several clubs – primarily the two Western Australian clubs West Coast and Fremantle, Tarrant was traded to the Fremantle Football Club in a deal that saw Paul Medhurst and Draft Selection #8 head to Collingwood.

On being traded to the Dockers, Tarrant said that Subiaco Oval, both Fremantle and the West Coast Eagles' home ground, would suit his style of play. He also thought that playing alongside Matthew Pavlich, a similar styled player, would be difficult for opposition defences. He also looked forward to a chance to play in the same team as his former schoolmate Dean Solomon, who was also traded to Fremantle.

Tarrant was given the number 17 guernsey to wear. He was initially used to work up on the ground and had racked up multiple possessions playing in that role. He has also played as a second string forward in a forward line that depended much on Pavlich.

In 2009, coach Harvey moved Tarrant into defence following some poor form up forward. The move was successful, with Tarrant putting together a string of noteworthy defensive performances on opposition forwards as well as providing some penetrating rebound attack.

=== Return to Collingwood ===
On 11 October 2010, the final day of the trade period, Tarrant returned to Collingwood in a trade that saw him and pick 44 traded to Collingwood for picks 43 and 55. He was given the Number 2 guernsey and continued to play as a back and full-back as he had at Fremantle.

Tarrant announced his retirement on 21 August 2012, effective from the end of the 2012 season.

== Statistics ==
Legend
G	Goals	K	Kicks	D	Disposals	T	Tackles
B	Behinds	H	Handballs	M	Marks

Season	Team	No.	Games	Totals							Averages (per game)							Votes
Season	Team	No.	Games	G	B	K	H	D	M	T	G	B	K	H	D	M	T	Votes
1998	Collingwood	20	11	3	6	39	22	61	19	11	0.3	0.5	3.5	2.0	5.5	1.7	1.0	0
1999	Collingwood	20	13	15	8	107	80	187	60	16	1.2	0.6	8.2	6.2	14.4	4.6	1.2	0
2000	Collingwood	20	19	28	13	172	82	254	121	20	1.5	0.7	9.1	4.3	13.4	6.4	1.1	0
2001	Collingwood	20	22	53	29	214	44	258	139	24	2.4	1.3	9.7	2.0	11.7	6.3	1.1	6
2002	Collingwood	20	20	38	31	159	68	227	98	29	1.9	1.6	8.0	3.4	11.4	4.9	1.5	4
2003	Collingwood	20	25	54	44	301	74	375	219	38	2.2	1.8	12.0	3.0	15.0	8.8	1.5	12
2004	Collingwood	20	14	36	30	144	37	181	109	17	2.6	2.1	10.3	2.6	12.9	7.8	1.2	3
2005	Collingwood	20	17	36	27	133	49	182	93	28	2.1	1.6	7.8	2.9	10.7	5.5	1.6	1
2006	Collingwood	20	20	36	31	195	84	279	151	39	1.8	1.5	9.8	4.2	14.0	7.6	2.9	2
2007	Fremantle	17	21	33	27	203	88	291	134	34	1.6	1.3	9.7	4.2	13.9	6.4	1.6	0
2008	Fremantle	20	16	23	14	146	68	214	97	33	1.4	0.9	9.1	4.3	13.4	6.1	2.1	0
2009	Fremantle	20	22	3	2	142	137	279	87	44	0.1	0.1	6.5	6.2	12.7	4.0	2.0	0
2010	Fremantle	20	13	1	1	77	62	139	39	31	0.1	0.1	5.9	4.8	10.7	3.0	2.4	0
2011	Collingwood	2	23	2	1	103	120	223	71	26	0.1	0.0	4.5	5.2	9.7	3.1	1.1	1
2012	Collingwood	2	12	6	5	80	40	120	54	24	0.5	0.4	6.7	3.3	10.0	4.5	2.0	0
Career			268	367	269	2215	1055	3270	1491	414	1.4	1.0	8.3	3.9	12.2	5.6	1.5	29

== Post-AFL career ==
Since his retirement, Tarrant has become a "fly-in" footballer, signing to play games with clubs around Australia to boost popularity for the clubs. Tarrant signed on to play one game for the North Launceston Bombers in 2013, kicking seven goals against eventual premiers South Launceston.

Tarrant also made one appearance for the Glenorchy Football Club in 2013 in the TSL.

Tarrant returned to the Bombers in 2014, signing a minimum five game contract, with the option of continuing for finals. He appeared in the qualifying final, kicking five goals to help the Bombers advance to the second semi. During the second semi final, he was reported for striking a Clarence player, but received a reprimand due to his good record. With the Bombers causing an upset, Tarrant lined up in the Tasmanian State League Grand Final.

== Off-field incidents ==
In August 2006, Tarrant and Collingwood teammate Ben Johnson were involved in a fight at a Port Melbourne nightclub. Johnson was charged with recklessly causing injury and unlawful assault and accepted responsibility for the incident. Tarrant was not charged, but was fined $5,000 by Collingwood for breaking the players code of conduct.

In June 2007, Tarrant was accused of showing his backside to a female patron of a Darwin nightclub and punching the Federal ALP candidate for Division of Solomon, Damian Hale, after he confronted Tarrant about his behaviour. After the Fremantle Football Club took the unusual step of referring the matter to the AFL to investigate, they fined Tarrant $5,000 and suspended him for three matches, with two matches suspended until the end of 2008.

== Career highlights ==
- 2nd Collingwood best and fairest 2003
- Collingwood leading goalkicker 2001, 2002 (equal), 2003, 2004, 2005
- Anzac Day Medal 2001
- All-Australian 2003
- AFL Mark of the Year 2003
- Jason McCartney Medal 2006
