= Luke Williams (Australian rules footballer) =

Australian rules footballer (born 1979)

Personal information
- Born: 29 December 1979 (age 46)
- Original team: St Kevins/Oakleigh U18
- Debut: Round 17, 23 July 1999, Melbourne vs. St Kilda, at Melbourne Cricket Ground

Playing career^{1}
Years	Club	Games (Goals)
1999–2005	Melbourne	51 (10)
- ^{1} Playing statistics correct to the end of 2005.

Luke Williams (born 29 December 1979) is a former Australian rules footballer who played in the Australian Football League (AFL).

Picked up in the 1998 AFL draft, Williams was a utility who could play up forward or in the midfield. Debuting in 1999, he had very limited opportunities at the Melbourne Football Club, and after seven seasons on the list, Williams finally notched up his 50th AFL game in 2005. He spent most of his career with Melbourne playing in the Demons' reserve side, the Sandringham Zebras, in the Victorian Football League.

At the end of 2005, Melbourne decided to delist Williams.
