= Simon Eastaugh =

Australian rules footballer and coach

Personal information
- Born: 12 June 1973 (age 53)
- Original team: Norwood (SANFL)

Playing career^{1}
| Years | Club | Games (Goals) |
| 1998–1999 | Essendon | 17 (1) |
| 2001–2002 | Fremantle | 12 (1) |
| Total | | 29 (2) |

Coaching career
| Years | Club | Games (W–L–D) |
| 2006–2007 | Perth (WAFL) | 40 (10–30–0) |
- ^{1} Playing statistics correct to the end of 2002.

Simon Eastaugh (born 12 June 1973) is a former Australian rules footballer who played for the Essendon Football Club and the Fremantle Football Club in the Australian Football League (AFL). He also played for Norwood in the South Australian National Football League (SANFL) and both South Fremantle and East Fremantle in the West Australian Football League (WAFL). He mainly played as a ruckman and has coached the Perth Football Club in the WAFL. Eastaugh has also been an assistant coach at the West Coast Eagles and is now with the Fremantle Football Club and in the role of Head of Community Engagement

== Playing career ==
Originally from Shepparton, Victoria, Eastaugh was drafted by Richmond Football Club in 1989 at the age of 16 years. After four seasons at Richmond, he was delisted and joined Norwood in the SANFL for two seasons, winning the SANFL premiership in 1997. From Norwood, Eastaugh was drafted to Essendon as the 68th selection in the 1997 AFL draft. He only played 17 games for the Bombers in three years before he was delisted at the end of the 2000 season, having not played a game in Essendon's premiership season.

Fremantle then selected him with the 4th selection in the 2001 Preseason Draft. In 2001, despite Fremantle having a winless start to the season, Eastaugh did not play an AFL game until coach Damian Drum was replaced by Ben Allan in round 11. Despite playing 11 of the last 12 games of the 2001 season, he only played a single game in 2002 before he retired from AFL football at the end of the season.

In addition to coaching Perth in the WAFL, he has also been a ruck and rehabilitation coach at Fremantle and in 2007 was an assistant coach for the WAFL state team that played a representative VFL side.

Eastaugh was ruck and development coach for the West Coast Eagles from 2010 to 2013; he coached Dean Cox and Nic Naitanui with both players taking out All-Australian honours during that time. At the end of the 2013 season Eastaugh rejoined the Fremantle Football Club as ruck coach working with players such as Aaron Sandilands, Jon Griffin and Zac Clarke.
