= Jaxon Crabb =

Australian rules footballer

Personal information
- Full name: Jaxon Trent Crabb
- Born: 7 November 1979 (age 46); Bunbury, Western Australia
- Original team: South Bunbury (SWFL)
- Draft: No. 12, 1997 national draft No. 28, 2002 rookie draft
- Height: 180 cm (5 ft 11 in)
- Weight: 84 kg (185 lb)
- Position: Midfielder

Playing career^{1}
Years	Club	Games (Goals)
1997–2001; 2003–2009	Claremont (WAFL)	188 (109)
1998–2000	West Coast	15 (2)
2002	Port Adelaide	4 (0)
Total		207 (111)

Representative team honours
Years	Team	Games (Goals)
1998–2007	Western Australia	5 (1)
- ^{1} Playing statistics correct to the end of 2009.

Career highlights
- Western Australia captain 2005; Sandover Medal 2005

Jaxon Trent Crabb (born 7 November 1979) is a former Australian rules footballer who played as a midfielder for the West Coast Eagles and Port Adelaide Football Club.

He is the brother of former professional tennis player Jaymon Crabb.

== Football career ==
Crabb played 188 games for WAFL club Claremont between 1997 and his retirement in 2009. He is a member of the WA Football 200 Club and shared the 2005 Sandover Medal with Toby McGrath as the best player in the WAFL for that year.

=== West Coast career ===
Jaxon was drafted by the West Coast Eagles with the twelfth selection in the 1997 AFL draft and played his first game for the club against Richmond. He collected 10 disposals in his first match. Crabb spent 3 years on West Coast's list, playing only 15 AFL games in that time.

=== Port Adelaide career ===
Crabb then found himself on Port Adelaide's rookie list for the 2002 season. He played a total of 4 games during this season and was delisted upon its conclusion. Jaxon then returned to WAFL club Claremont.
