= Nathan Brown (Australian footballer, born 1976) =

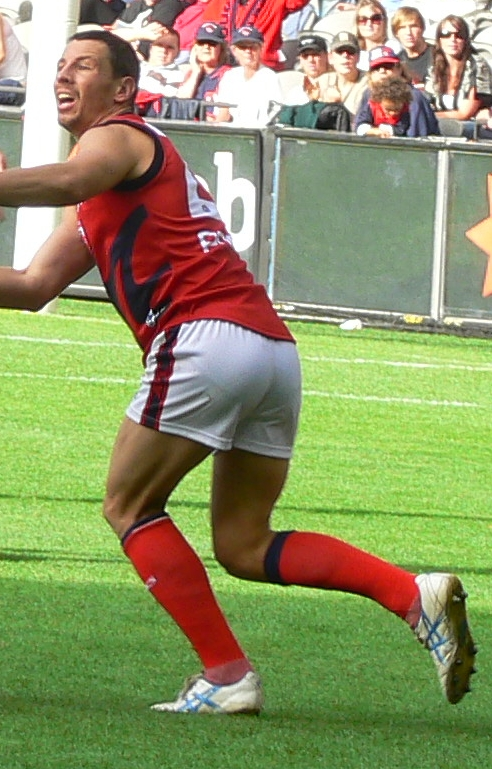

Personal information
- Born: 14 August 1976 (age 50)
- Original team: West Adelaide (SANFL)
- Debut: Round 4, 1998, Melbourne vs. Carlton, at Optus Oval
- Height: 180 cm (5 ft 11 in)
- Weight: 76 kg (168 lb)

Playing career^{1}
Years	Club	Games (Goals)
1998–2007	Melbourne	146 (36)
- ^{1} Playing statistics correct to the end of 2007.

Career highlights
- Fourth Best and Fairest 2002; Most Consistent Player 2002; Second Best and Fairest 2004; Most Consistent Player 2004; Best Clubman 2005

Nathan Daniel Brown (born 14 August 1976) is an Australian rules footballer who played for the Melbourne Demons in the Australian Football League.

He was drafted in the 1997 AFL draft at pick number 66 overall, From Pinnaroo, South Australia. He made his AFL debut in 1998 against Carlton at Princes Park. His performance in the last quarter with the game in the balance prompted the Channel 7 commentary team to opine that it was one of the best debut performances they had seen. A series of soft-tissue injuries plagued him over the following seasons, and he was not part of Melbourne's 2000 Grand Final side. He managed 22 games in the 2005 season, which also saw him share his milestone of 100 games with the recently retired Guy Rigoni in round four. Brown had a solid season after he took his game to another level in 2004, where he finished second in the club best and fairest. In that season, he averaged 18 disposals a game and was used in a variety of backline and midfield roles. Well known for his gut-running and attack on the ball.

He retired at the end of the 2007 AFL season.

In October 2007, he signed on to play for three years with West Adelaide Football Club in the SANFL.

He was appointed captain of West Adelaide for the 2008 season under a new coach, Hawthorn premiership player Andrew Collins.

Brown coached and played at Cheltenham Football Club in the Southern Football League for a number of years until being secured as the new coach of The Old Melburnian Football Club for the 2025 season in the Amateur B Grade competition and brought much-needed success, winning the 2025 premiership.
