= Todd Holmes =

Australian rules footballer

Personal information
- Full name: Todd Brian Holmes
- Born: 14 July 1979 (age 47)
- Original team: Kalgoorlie City
- Draft: 37th, 1997 AFL draft
- Height: 187 cm (6 ft 2 in)
- Weight: 88 kg (194 lb)

Playing career^{1}
Years	Club	Games (Goals)
1997–98, 2000–07	Subiaco	122 (16)
1998–2000	West Coast Eagles	7 (0)
1999	Claremont	9 (1)
- ^{1} Playing statistics correct to the end of 2007.

Todd Brian Holmes (born 14 July 1979) is a former Australian rules footballer who played with the West Coast Eagles in the Australian Football League (AFL).

A half back from Kalgoorlie, Holmes was only able to make seven appearances in the seniors and twice finished a game without a disposal.

Holmes never once played in a win while with the Eagles but had more success in the WAFL where he was a Subiaco premiership player in 2004 and 2006. Despite playing 20 games in 1997, he missed selection in the grand final but did play in the reserves premiership.

He played for the Western Australian interstate football team on two occasions, having previously represented his state in the Under-17s and Under-18s.
