= Linden Stevens =

Australian rules footballer

Personal information
- Full name: Linden Stevens
- Born: 13 June 1978 (age 48)
- Original team: Sturt
- Draft: 65th, 1997 AFL draft
- Height: 186 cm (6 ft 1 in)
- Weight: 80 kg (176 lb)

Playing career^{1}
Years	Club	Games (Goals)
1998	Adelaide	2 (0)
- ^{1} Playing statistics correct to the end of 1998.

Linden Stevens (born 13 June 1978) is a former Australian rules footballer who played with Adelaide in the Australian Football League (AFL).

Selected with the 65th pick of the 1997 AFL draft, Stevens was brought into the Adelaide team after some good performances in the SANFL with Sturt. A utility, he debuted in the final round of the 1998 home and away season against West Coast at Subiaco and came off the bench to have five disposals. The following week he played a qualifying final at the MCG against Melbourne but had just two touches and did not retain his spot in the side. Stevens, who played his early football at Scotch College, did not make any senior appearances in 1999 through injury and was demoted to the rookie list, then de-listed.
