= Rowan Jones =

Australian rules footballer

Personal information
- Born: 19 November 1979 (age 46)
- Original team: Claremont (WAFL)
- Debut: Round 19, 9 August 1998, West Coast vs. Sydney Swans, at S.C.G.
- Height: 187 cm (6 ft 2 in)
- Weight: 80 kg (176 lb)

Playing career^{1}
Years	Club	Games (Goals)
1998–2007	West Coast	158 (70)
- ^{1} Playing statistics correct to the end of 2007.

Career highlights
- AFL premiership player: 2006; AFL Rising Star nominee: 1999

Rowan "RoJo" Jones (born 19 November 1979) is a retired Australian rules footballer who played for the West Coast Eagles in the Australian Football League.

Recruited at pick 28 in the 1997 AFL draft by the Eagles from local WAFL club Claremont, Jones debuted in his first season at the Eagles, the round 19, 1998 match against the Sydney Swans at the SCG. From the 1999 season, Jones became a regular selection in the West Coast team, and indeed finished third in the Eagles' best and fairest in 2001.

Jones' form tailed off quite a bit in 2004, coinciding with an appointment as a vice-captain, and when the 2005 season came around, spots in the side were scarce, and Jones was relegated to playing in the WAFL for much of the season. A weight of impressive performances at WAFL level enabled Jones to force his way into the Eagles senior side for four matches, including the Preliminary Final, but he was injured at training and was unable to play in the Grand Final loss.

Jones's improved form late in 2005 carried through into the 2006 season, where he once again became a regular in the team, playing 23 of a possible 26 games, including being a member of the Eagles Grand Final team that won by a point over the Swans and thus a premiership player.

Rowan Jones announced his retirement on 19 September 2007, citing a desire to leave the game on his own terms and spend more time with his young family.

== Statistics ==
Legend
G	Goals	K	Kicks	D	Disposals	T	Tackles
B	Behinds	H	Handballs	M	Marks

Season	Team	No.	Games	Totals							Averages (per game)						
Season	Team	No.	Games	G	B	K	H	D	M	T	G	B	K	H	D	M	T
1998	West Coast	31	2	1	0	3	2	5	2	2	0.5	0.0	1.5	1.0	2.5	1.0	1.0
1999	West Coast	31	16	7	5	68	70	138	27	20	0.4	0.3	4.3	4.4	8.6	1.7	1.3
2000	West Coast	18	20	8	10	138	134	272	41	56	0.4	0.5	6.9	6.7	13.6	2.1	2.8
2001	West Coast	18	18	11	4	115	133	248	51	54	0.6	0.2	6.4	7.4	13.8	2.8	3.0
2002	West Coast	18	13	6	0	66	105	171	22	42	0.5	0.0	5.1	8.1	13.2	1.7	3.2
2003	West Coast	18	23	14	15	183	175	358	93	64	0.6	0.7	8.0	7.6	15.6	4.0	2.8
2004	West Coast	18	16	0	4	74	122	196	45	41	0.0	0.3	4.6	7.6	12.3	2.8	2.6
2005	West Coast	18	4	2	2	27	35	62	13	7	0.5	0.5	6.8	8.8	15.5	3.3	1.8
2006	West Coast	18	23	9	16	178	274	452	117	57	0.4	0.7	7.7	11.9	19.7	5.1	2.5
2007	West Coast	18	23	12	5	191	245	436	101	43	0.5	0.2	8.3	10.7	19.0	4.4	1.9
Career			158	70	61	1043	1295	2338	512	386	0.4	0.4	6.6	8.2	14.8	3.2	2.4
