= Greg Tivendale =

Australian rules footballer, born 1979

Personal information
- Full name: Greg Tivendale
- Born: 19 April 1979 (age 47)
- Original team: Rythdale-Officer-Cardinia / Gippsland Power
- Draft: No. 20, 1998 Rookie Draft, Richmond
- Height: 185 cm (6 ft 1 in)
- Weight: 86 kg (190 lb)
- Position: Midfielder

Playing career^{1}
Years	Club	Games (Goals)
1998–2008	Richmond	188 (125)
- ^{1} Playing statistics correct to the end of 2008.

Greg Tivendale (born 19 April 1979) is a former Australian rules footballer who played in the Australian Football League (AFL). Recruited from the Gippsland Power and Rythdale-Officer-Cardinia Football Club, Tivendale debuted in 1998 with the Richmond Football Club and was noted for talents including his long-kicking and long-range goals of his left boot.

In Round 20, 2006, as the Tigers defeated Carlton by 45 points, Tivendale was awarded the second Terry Wallace Medal for best afield in Richmond's tenth win for the season.

In 2008, Tivendale was informed he was not a required player for the 2009 season by the Richmond Football Club, and was given a farewell game in the last game of the 2008 season against Melbourne (Round 22). He told media at the time that he was considering electing for the 2008 AFL Pre-Season draft.

On 31 November 2008, it was announced that Tivendale had signed for his junior club, the Rythdale-Officer-Cardinia Football Club, as a player for the 2009 season in the Casey-Cardinia Football League, a division of the Mornington Peninsula Nepean Football League.

Tivendale ended his AFL career after 188 games and kicking 125 goals in an 11-year stint at Richmond.
