= Trent Hoppner =

Australian rules footballer (born 1979)

Personal information
- Born: 19 February 1979 (age 47)
- Original team: Preston Knights
- Draft: 70th overall, 1997 National Draft
- Height: 175 cm (5 ft 9 in)
- Weight: 71 kg (157 lb)

Playing career^{1}
Years	Club	Games (Goals)
1998	Carlton	1 (0)
- ^{1} Playing statistics correct to the end of 1998.

Trent Hoppner (born 19 February 1979) is a former Australian rules footballer who played with Carlton in the Australian Football League (AFL). Plagued by injuries including shoulder problems and a stress fracture of the shin, Hoppner only had the chance to play one game before leaving the club.
