= Lance Picioane =

Australian rules footballer

Personal information
- Full name: Lance Picioane
- Born: 7 June 1980 (age 46)
- Original team: Essendon Grammar
- Draft: 17th overall, 1997 AFL draft 4th overall, 2005 Pre-Season Draft
- Height: 183 cm (6 ft 0 in)
- Weight: 89 kg (196 lb)
- Position: Midfielder

Playing career^{1}
Years	Club	Games (Goals)
1998–1999	Adelaide	4 (2)
2000–2004	Hawthorn	58 (24)
2005	North Melbourne	15 (2)
Total		77 (28)
- ^{1} Playing statistics correct to the end of 2005.

Career highlights
- VFL premiership player: 2001

Lance Picioane (born 7 June 1980) is a former Australian rules footballer who played for Adelaide, Hawthorn and the Kangaroos during his time in the Australian Football League (AFL).

Picioane attended Essendon Grammar and was captain of the Vic Metro Under 16s and Under 17s which played in the victorious Vic Metro at the 1997 AFL Under 18 Championships.

Picioane started his career in 1998 with Adelaide but found it difficult to find a regular spot with a side that had won a premiership the previous season. He failed to play a senior game for Adelaide in 1999 and at the end of the season he was traded to Hawthorn for pick 79 in the upcoming draft.

Playing mostly in the midfield, Picioane managed 58 games in his five years at Hawthorn before being delisted at the end of the 2004 season. Early in the 2004 season, Piciaone was with Danny Jacobs when Jacobs was caught drink driving. After initially lying about Picioane's involvement, both players were fined $5000 and suspended from playing for a week. He then joined North Melbourne for the 2005 season.

Picioane suffered a range of mental health issues, including depression and anxiety, during his football playing days and this led him down a path of substance abuse. In 2012, he sought professional assistance, and, after going "cold turkey" from substances, he walked from Sydney to Melbourne (with his mother in a support vehicle) to raise awareness of mental illness. In 2013 he founded an organisation 'Love Me Love You' which aims to improve and empower the lives of young people with mental health and substance abuse issues.

His father, Joe Picioane, was a soccer player who represented the Australia national soccer team in 1978 and 1979. He is of Romanian descent.
