= Andrew Williams (Australian footballer) =

Australian rules footballer, born 1979

Personal information
- Born: 1 March 1979 (age 47); Victoria, Australia
- Original team: Doveton juniors / Dandenong U18
- Debut: Round 15, 1998, West Coast Eagles vs. Brisbane Lions, at The Gabba
- Height: 183 cm (6 ft 0 in)
- Weight: 83 kg (183 lb)

Playing career^{1}
Years	Club	Games (Goals)
1998–2002	West Coast	84 (42)
2003–2005	Collingwood	32 (22)
Total		116 (64)
- ^{1} Playing statistics correct to the end of 2005.

Career highlights
- 1999: AFL Rising Star nominee; 2003: VFL premiership player

Andrew Williams (born 1 March 1979) is a former professional Australian rules footballer who played for the West Coast Eagles and Collingwood Football Club in the Australian Football League (AFL). In total, Williams played 116 games in the AFL. As of 2025 he coaches.

== Playing career ==
=== West Coast Eagles ===
Williams was recruited to the West Coast Eagles in the 1997 AFL draft. He was rated in his younger days as a half-forward flanker and winger and initially selected as a long-term prospect. Williams played five games in his debut season followed by 22 games, including two finals, in his second season. Williams played a further 57 games for West Coast over the following three seasons, which included playing all 22 games in 2001. Williams played a total of 84 games for the Eagles between 1998 and 2002.

=== Collingwood ===
He eventually returned to Victoria in 2003 when he was traded to Collingwood in return for Damien Adkins. Williams had a solid first year for the Magpies, playing 22 games before suffering injury in the Qualifying Final against Brisbane. As a result, he missed selection to Collingwoods Grand Final side but was controversially allowed to play in Williamstown's VFL Grand Final victory, his first game for the Seagulls.

=== Williamstown ===
Despite a good first year for Collingwood, Williams remained playing for Williamstown, Collingwoods then VFL affiliate, over the next two seasons and managed just 10 more AFL games between 2004 and 2005. He was delisted by Collingwood at the end of the 2005 season, but after his delisting, Williams continued to play for the Seagulls until 2008.

In total, Williams played 116 games in the AFL.

== Coaching career ==
In 2018, Williams became the coach of Monbulk.

In 2024, he became the coach of Berwick.
