= Joel McKay =

Australian rules footballer

Personal information
- Full name: Joel McKay
- Born: 16 July 1979 (age 47)
- Original teams: Wodonga Raiders, Murray Bushrangers
- Draft: No. 15, 1997 National Draft
- Height: 184 cm (6 ft 0 in)
- Weight: 78 kg (172 lb)

Playing career^{1}
Years	Club	Games (Goals)
1998–2000	Geelong	4 (0)
- ^{1} Playing statistics correct to the end of 2001.

Joel McKay (born 16 July 1979) is a former Australian rules footballer who played with Geelong in the Australian Football League (AFL).

Geelong secured McKay with the 15th selection of the 1997 National Draft. He was drafted from the Murray Bushrangers, but came from Wodonga originally. During his time at Geelong he struggled with back injuries and played just four senior AFL games, two in 1998 and two in 2000.
