= Laurie Bellotti =

Australian rules footballer

Personal information
- Full name: Laurence Allen Bellotti
- Born: 28 February 1976 (age 50)
- Original team: Carnarvon
- Height: 195 cm (6 ft 5 in)
- Weight: 94 kg (207 lb)

Playing career^{1}
Years	Club	Games (Goals)
1996–2000	Claremont	38 (14)
1999–2000	West Coast Eagles	24 (2)
2001	West Perth	18 (6)
- ^{1} Playing statistics correct to the end of 2001.

Laurence Allen "Laurie" Bellotti (born 28 February 1976) is a former Australian rules footballer who played with the West Coast Eagles in the Australian Football League (AFL).

An Indigenous Australian, Bellotti was a utility player who had excelled at basketball back home in Carnarvon. He was a member of the Claremont Colts premiership side of 1996 and played a full season for the seniors in 1998.

Bellotti played 15 games for the Eagles in 1999, as a rookie, but was promoted from the rookie list after the season ended. He appeared in only nine more games in the AFL and finished his career at West Perth.
