= Tim Finocchiaro =

Australian rules footballer

Personal information
- Full name: Tim Finocchiaro
- Born: 19 June 1979 (age 47)
- Original team: Eastern Ranges
- Draft: 61st, 1997 National Draft
- Height: 177 cm (5 ft 10 in)
- Weight: 84 kg (185 lb)

Playing career^{1}
Years	Club	Games (Goals)
1998–1999	Geelong	10 (1)
- ^{1} Playing statistics correct to the end of 1999.

Tim Finocchiaro (born 19 June 1979) is a former Australian rules footballer who played with Geelong in the Australian Football League (AFL).

Finocchiaro won the Larke Medal in 1997, for his performances with Vic Metro. He played in the TAC Cup for Eastern Ranges, from where he was selected at pick 61 in the 1997 National Draft, but he was originally from Warrandyte. In 1998 he appeared in six of the opening eight rounds, but then fell ill with glandular fever. He played just four more games for Geelong, all in 1999.
