= Nathan Thompson (Australian footballer) =

Australian rules footballer, born 1978

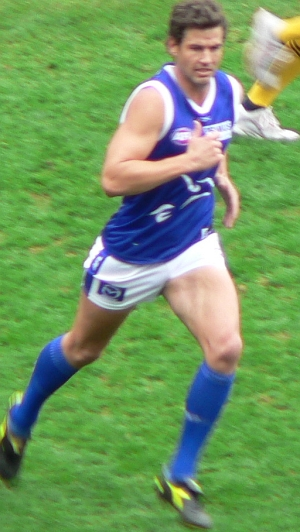
- Nathan Thompson playing for the Kangaroos during the 2006 AFL Season

Personal information
- Full name: Nathan Thompson
- Born: 14 February 1978 (age 48)
- Original team: Kyneton / Bendigo U18
- Height: 196 cm (6 ft 5 in)
- Weight: 100 kg (220 lb)
- Position: Forward

Playing career^{1}
Years	Club	Games (Goals)
1998–2004	Hawthorn	119 (192)
2005–2008	Kangaroos	60 (135)
Total		179 (327)
- ^{1} Playing statistics correct to the end of 2008.

Career highlights
- AFL pre-season premiership player: 1999; 2× Hawthorn leading goalkicker: 2003, 2004; 2× Kangaroos leading goalkicker: 2005, 2006; AFL Rising Star nominee: 1999

Nathan Thompson (born 14 February 1978) is a former Australian rules footballer, who previously played with the Hawthorn and North Melbourne clubs in the Australian Football League. He has been a panellist on the Sunday Footy Show.

== Early career ==
Thompson originated from the Kyneton and was invited to train with Hawthorn as an 18 year old. He spent 1997 playing with Hawthorns reserve grade team that accumulated with a reserve grand final appearance. He was one of Hawthorns best that day in a losing side. A tall marking forward, Thompson was an important young player for the club considering he was selected in the 1997 AFL draft at pick 82.

== Hawthorn career ==
It took time to establish himself, the club was dealing with the end of Jason Dunstalls long career as a spearhead. A strong overhead mark, Thompson seemed to have the kicking yips for pre-game nerves before settling into the rhythm of the game. Once settled he was accurate in front of goal. Thompson performed well in Hawthorn's 2001 campaign, in which they came within two goals of playing in the Grand Final, and Thompson finished 3rd in the Peter Crimmins Medal. Playing mostly at Full Forward with the occasional run in the ruck, Thompson was the club's leading goalkicker for seasons 2003 and 2004.

=== Depression ===
In 2004 Thompson admitted to the media that he had been suffering from clinical depression, a saga that raised awareness of the condition.

== North Melbourne career ==
At the end of 2004, possibly following the need for a fresh start following his revelation of depression, Thompson was a prized recruit for the North Melbourne Football Club and was seen as a big forward option alongside Saverio Rocca at the club. In 2005 he debuted for the Kangaroos and found himself working in rotation and occasionally in tandem with Rocca up forward, although this was not a permanent move due to Rocca's age and the top-heaviness of the Roos' forward line.

=== 2005 season ===
Thompson was the Kangaroos' leading goalkicker for 2005 with 52 goals and was considered a good choice for the Roos.

One of Thompson's most memorable games was the clash against Collingwood in Round 19. With the Roos trailing by almost 4 goals late in the 4th quarter, Thompson was part of a revival where the Kangaroos managed to take the lead in the dying moments. His contribution was 3 goals, including the matchwinner just before the siren. He gestured with a Hulk Hogan-style fist pump which remained one of the famous images of the 2005 AFL season.

=== 2006 season ===
In 2006 Thompson faced an eventful two weeks. In the Round 5 game against Melbourne, Thompson had helped the Kangaroos to get back in the game after they were trailing at half-time. Having booted 5 goals for the day and being in control of the Demons' defence, Thompson took a couple of important contested marks and was a dangerous presence up forward for North (in terms of scoring and marking power). He put the Kangaroos in front after they had trailed for much of the last three quarters and was on his way to perhaps putting in a match-winning performance. However following a desperate last-quarter chase of Melbourne's Nathan Carroll, Thompson in a shock move put himself on the bench, replacing himself with Drew Petrie. He was not sitting on the bench and was standing up, giving the impression that he wanted to come back onto the ground. Thompson later cited that he was "spent" and tired as the reasons for his early exit (Melbourne then went on to win the game with a last minute goal after the Kangaroos had several forward opportunities).

This controversy received a lot of media attention but for Sirengate, which occurred the day following the North Melbourne-Melbourne match and was so big that Thompson's voluntary send off (compared to Sally Robbins' rowing controversy by some in the media) was put on the back-burner.

In Round 6 Thompson said that he was willing to put the previous week's debacle aside and performed with an 8-goal haul, the best of his career, to give the Kangaroos a 22-point victory to lift them off the bottom of the ladder.

Glenn Archer wrote an article after Nathan Thompson's taking off incident, from "Thommo's" view, he made a point that Thommo had lactic acid in his legs and he decided it would be better for the team if he swapped with Drew.

=== 2007 season ===
Thompson had enjoyed a successful Pre-Season, with the new fast running attacking ball play ready to give him more of the footy. He kicked a Super Goal against Carlton in the Semi-Finals of the NAB Cup, then, a week later against St Kilda in a Practice Match, Thompson ruptured his ACL and missed the entire 2007 Season.

While in Darwin for the Darwin Cup, Thompson criticised former North Melbourne Football Club champion Wayne Carey about his criticisms of the club, which led Carey to respond with mockery of Thompson's depression on the Nine Network's Sunday morning Footy Show. In addition, on returning from a commercial break, Carey was clearly heard to make references to 'necking himself', to the apparent delight of other members of the Footy Show panel. Carey and the Nine Network were quick to issue an apology over the incident, although no mention was officially made of the 'necking himself' comment.

Thompson has recovered well from his knee injury and was considered a possibility of a return in 2007. His name was thrown around for the round 22 clash against the Western Bulldogs but he didn't end up playing. He also missed out on the finals with coach Laidley saying that she wouldn't risk changing the team's structure that had led to the success they had enjoyed over the season.

=== 2008 season ===
Thompson made his return to football in Round 1 of 2008 against the Essendon on Easter Monday. It was a good return, with Thompson booting 4 goals for the day as North lost by 55 points.

Thompson officially announced his retirement after being delisted by North Melbourne on 19 September 2008.

=== 2009 ===
On 24 December 2008, Thompson came out of retirement and signed with VFL club Werribee.

== Post AFL/VFL Career ==
Thompson played for the Doncaster Football Club in Division 3 of the Eastern Football League and kicked 9 goals in the 2013 Grand Final against Wantirna South. In 2016 he returned to his home town of Kyneton in central Victoria to play for the Kyneton Tigers.

== Statistics ==
Statistics are correct to the end of 2021.

Legend
G	Goals	K	Kicks	D	Disposals	T	Tackles
B	Behinds	H	Handballs	M	Marks	H/O	Hit-outs

Season	Team	No.	Games	Totals								Averages (per game)								Votes
Season	Team	No.	Games	G	B	K	H	D	M	T	H/O	G	B	K	H	D	M	T	H/O	Votes
1997	Hawthorn	49	0	—	—	—	—	—	—	—	—	—	—	—	—	—	—	—	—	0
1998	Hawthorn	49	2	—	—	3	1	4	—	—	—	0.0	0.0	1.5	0.5	2.0	0.0	—	—	0
1999	Hawthorn	16	18	23	21	114	57	171	75	9	131	1.3	1.1	6.3	3.2	9.5	4.2	0.5	7.3	4
2000	Hawthorn	16	22	39	19	155	64	219	106	9	92	1.8	0.9	7.1	2.9	10.0	4.8	0.4	4.2	1
2001	Hawthorn	23	25	30	27	235	114	349	155	30	185	1.2	1.1	9.4	4.6	14.0	6.2	3.2	23.2	5
2002	Hawthorn	23	18	26	17	132	61	193	85	22	120	1.4	0.9	7.3	3.4	10.7	4.7	2.6	21.4	5
2003	Hawthorn	23	15	38	15	118	46	164	91	18	103	2.5	1.0	7.9	3.1	11.0	6.1	0.8	3.26	2
2004	Hawthorn	23	19	36	20	135	54	189	89	16	62	1.9	1.1	8.2	1.7	9.9	6.0	1.8	21.7	3
2005	Kangaroos	23	23	52	29	189	39	228	138	14	40	2.3	1.3	8.2	1.7	9.9	6.0	0.6	1.7	8
2006	Kangaroos	23	22	54	40	192	43	235	152	24	5	2.5	1.8	8.7	1.9	10.6	6.9	1.1	0.2	13
2007	Kangaroos	23	0	—	—	—	—	—	—	—	—	—	—	—	—	—	—	—	—	0
2008	North Melbourne	23	15	29	13	92	36	128	67	21	12	1.9	0.9	6.1	2.4	8.5	4.5	1.4	0.8	2
Career			179	327	201	1365	515	1880	958	163	750	1.8	1.1	7.6	2.9	10.5	5.3	0.9	4.2	43
