= John Hynes (footballer) =

Australian rules footballer

Personal information
- Full name: John Hynes
- Born: 23 February 1979 (age 47); Cheltenham
- Original team: Cheltenham / Prahran Dragons
- Draft: 80th overall, 1997 National draft
- Height: 184 cm (6 ft 0 in)
- Weight: 87 kg (192 lb)
- Position: Key position

Club information
- Current club: St Peters JFC
- Number: 26

Playing career^{1}
Years	Club	Games (Goals)
1998–1999	Carlton	4 (2)
- ^{1} Playing statistics correct to the end of 1998.

John Hynes (born 23 February 1979) is a former Australian rules footballer who played with Carlton in the Australian Football League. Drafted in 1997, Hynes debuted the following year. Playing as a key position player at 184 cm, Hynes often had to play on much larger opponents. As a result, Hynes only managed four senior games in 1998, although he did win the reserves best and fairest award. After failing to play a senior match in 1999, Hynes was delisted by Carlton. He went on to play for Frankston in the Victorian Football League.

Hynes was named Frankston Reserve Team Coach for the 2004 season.

His son Cooper Hynes was drafted by Western Bulldogs in the 2024 AFL draft.

== Sources ==
- Holmesby, Russell & Main, Jim (2009). The Encyclopedia of AFL Footballers. 8th ed. Melbourne: Bas Publishing.
- John Hynes's playing statistics from AFL Tables
- John Hynes's profile at Blueseum
