= Paul Maher (footballer) =

Australian rules footballer

Personal information
- Born: 11 June 1976 (age 50)
- Original team: Perth (WAFL)
- Debut: Round 15, 1998, Fremantle vs. Sydney, at Subiaco

Playing career^{1}
Years	Club	Games (Goals)
1997–1998	Perth	29 (21)
1998–2000	Fremantle	5 (5)
1999	South Fremantle	12 (30)
2000–2002	Perth	43 (75)
2005–2006	Perth	24 (46)
Total		113 (177)
- ^{1} Playing statistics correct to the end of 2006.

Career highlights
- Perth club captain: 2001-2002; Perth leading goal scorer: 2000, 2001, 2006; Western Australian state team: 1998, 2001; WAFL grand finalist: 1999

Paul Maher (born 11 June 1976) is a former professional Australian rules footballer who played for Fremantle in the Australian Football League (AFL) and for Perth and South Fremantle in the West Australian Football League (WAFL).

After a promising debut WAFL season with Perth in 1997, Maher was the 21st selection in the 1998 AFL rookie draft.

Maher was elevated from the rookie list midway through the 1998 AFL season, but suffered a bad knee injury in just his third AFL game, Round 17, 1998 against Adelaide at Subiaco Oval. Maher would play two more AFL games late in 1999 but could not regain his form and was delisted after not playing an AFL game in 2000.

Maher continued his playing career in the WAFL with Perth, captaining the club in 2001 and 2002, before retiring at the end of the 2006 season.

In 2008 and 2009 Maher was the reserves coach at the Perth Football Club in the WAFL.
