= Luke Power =

Australian rules footballer, born 1980

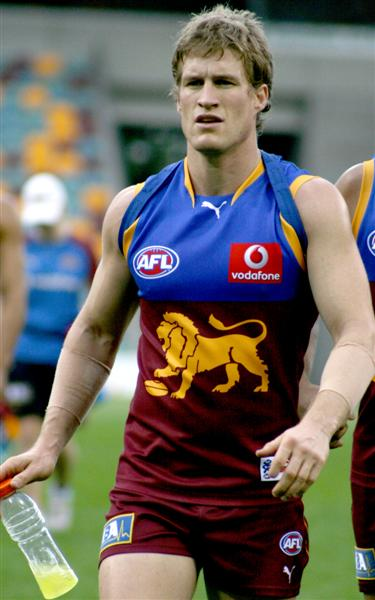
- Power training with the Brisbane Lions in 2008

Personal information
- Full name: Luke Power
- Nickname: Finger
- Born: 8 January 1980 (age 46); Melbourne, Victoria
- Original team: Oakleigh Chargers (TAC Cup)
- Draft: No. 5, 1997 national draft
- Height: 180 cm (5 ft 11 in)
- Weight: 79 kg (174 lb)
- Position: Utility

Playing career^{1}
Years	Club	Games (Goals)
1998–2011	Brisbane Lions	282 (226)
2012	Greater Western Sydney	20 (0)
Total		302 (226)

Representative team honours
Years	Team	Games (Goals)
2008	Victoria	1 (0)

International team honours
2000, 2003	Australia	4
- ^{1} Playing statistics correct to the end of 2012.

Career highlights
- 3× AFL premiership player: 2001, 2002, 2003; Brisbane Co-Captain: 2007–2008; Greater Western Sydney Co-Captain: 2012; All-Australian team: 2004; Madden Medal: 2012; AFL Rising Star nominee: 1998, 1999; AFL Assistant Coach of the Year: 2021

Luke Power (born 8 January 1980) is a former Australian rules footballer who played for the Brisbane Lions and Greater Western Sydney Giants in the Australian Football League (AFL). A member of the Brisbane Lions's 2001, 2002, and 2003 premiership winning teams, he played 282 games for the Lions before moving to Greater Western Sydney where he played his final season.

== Early life ==
Power grew up in Melbourne’s eastern suburbs and attended Trinity Grammar School. He played junior football for Balwyn in the YJFL.

== AFL career ==
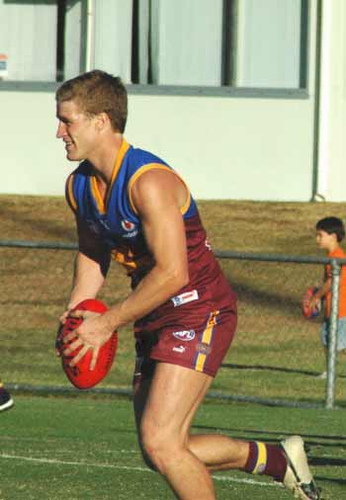
Power with the Lions in 2007

=== Brisbane Lions (1998–2011) ===
==== Premiership sides (1998–2003) ====
Power debuted for the Lions as an 18-year-old in 1998, and he has been noted ever since for his skills and desire to win the ball. He has played in all three of Brisbane's premierships.

==== Leadership (2004–2009) ====
Power was named as a vice-captain in 2004, where he won All-Australian selection in 2004. Midway through 2005 he was out of contract and was expected to arrive at the Collingwood FC, but decided he would stay with the Brisbane Lions. He retained the position in 2005. In 2006, he was an inaugural member of the Brisbane Lions Leadership group, under captain Michael Voss. When Voss retired at the end of 2006, Power was named as co-captain of the side in 2007, alongside Black, Lappin, Chris Johnson, and Jonathan Brown. After Johnson's retirement in 2007, Power was one of four co-captains. Lappin's retirement at the end of 2008 means there was only three of the original five co-captains remaining. At the start of 2009, the new coach, Michael Voss, changed the co-captain system. Jonathon Brown was made stand-alone captain, with four vice-captains - Simon Black, Jed Adcock, Daniel Merrett and Power. In 2009, he was another consistent year for Luke Power as he led the Disposal count for the Lions with 615. He finished 4th in the Best and Fairest voting behind Mitch Clark, Simon Black and eventual winner Jonathan Brown.

==== End of Brisbane Lions career (2010–2011) ====
In Round 10 of the 2010 season, in which the Lions took on Collingwood at the Gabba, Power played his 250th game, a match where the Lions upset the eventual premiers Collingwood by eight points, giving Power the perfect celebration for his milestone. In 2011, Power remained one of only three players (the others being Simon Black and Jonathan Brown) from the triple-premiership winning Brisbane Lions sides of 2001-2003. Luke Power retired after the Round 23 match against West Coast, having played 282 games for the Lions. His retirement was primarily due to being told that his position in the Lions side would not be guaranteed in 2012.

=== Greater Western Sydney (2012) ===
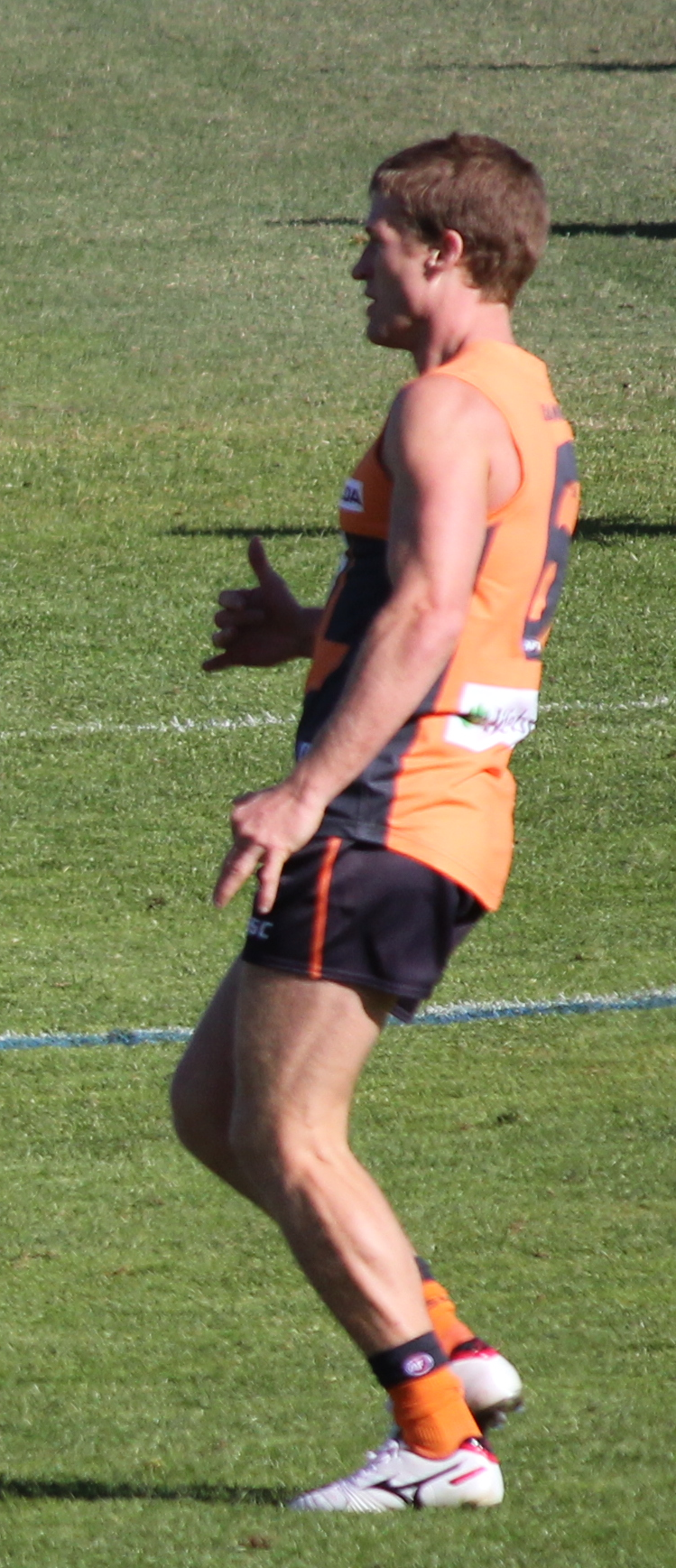
Power with the Giants in 2012

On 17 September 2011, it was announced, he would be joining Greater Western Sydney. He was made co-captain alongside Phil Davis and Callan Ward. In Round 21 of the 2012 season, Power became the 66th person to play 300 VFL/AFL games, (282 for the Brisbane Lions, 18 for GWS). Power then retired from his playing career at the end of the 2012 season.

== Statistics ==
Legend
G	Goals	K	Kicks	D	Disposals	T	Tackles
B	Behinds	H	Handballs	M	Marks

Season	Team	No.	Games	Totals							Averages (per game)						
Season	Team	No.	Games	G	B	K	H	D	M	T	G	B	K	H	D	M	T
1998	Brisbane Lions	6	9	3	3	83	44	127	27	12	0.3	0.3	9.2	4.9	14.1	3.0	1.3
1999	Brisbane Lions	6	16	17	15	157	76	233	42	22	1.1	0.9	9.8	4.8	14.6	2.6	1.4
2000	Brisbane Lions	6	22	52	19	260	136	396	70	47	2.4	0.9	11.8	6.2	18.0	3.2	2.1
2001	Brisbane Lions	6	15	16	17	131	64	195	41	27	1.1	1.1	8.7	4.3	13.0	2.7	1.8
2002	Brisbane Lions	6	22	19	10	253	129	382	78	60	0.9	0.5	11.5	5.9	17.4	3.5	2.7
2003	Brisbane Lions	6	26	27	12	349	190	539	120	72	1.0	0.5	13.4	7.3	20.7	4.6	2.8
2004	Brisbane Lions	6	24	15	14	364	169	533	90	78	0.6	0.6	15.2	7.0	22.2	3.8	3.3
2005	Brisbane Lions	6	20	12	9	314	131	445	88	65	0.6	0.5	15.7	6.6	22.3	4.4	3.3
2006	Brisbane Lions	6	22	15	7	376	185	561	106	81	0.7	0.3	17.1	8.4	25.5	4.8	3.7
2007	Brisbane Lions	6	19	9	8	246	206	452	65	96	0.5	0.4	12.9	10.8	23.8	3.4	5.1
2008	Brisbane Lions	6	22	7	8	286	256	542	73	100	0.3	0.4	13.0	11.6	24.6	3.3	4.5
2009	Brisbane Lions	6	24	6	6	307	308	615	94	121	0.3	0.3	12.8	12.8	25.6	3.9	5.0
2010	Brisbane Lions	6	21	9	4	269	212	481	84	79	0.4	0.2	12.8	10.1	22.9	4.0	3.8
2011	Brisbane Lions	6	20	19	9	191	192	383	61	80	1.0	0.5	9.6	9.6	19.2	3.1	4.0
2012	Greater Western Sydney	6	20	0	1	227	182	409	84	52	0.0	0.1	11.4	9.1	20.5	4.2	2.6
Career			302	226	142	3813	2480	6293	1123	992	0.7	0.5	12.6	8.2	20.8	3.7	3.3

== Honours and achievements ==
Team

- AFL Premiership (Brisbane Lions): 2001, 2002, 2003

Individual

- All-Australian: 2004
- Brisbane Lions A.F.C. Co-Captain: 2007–2008
- AFL Players’ Association Madden Medal: 2012

== Coaching career ==
=== Greater Western Sydney ===
Shortly after his retirement from his playing career, Power then became an assistant coach with Greater Western Sydney Giants in their second AFL season in the 2013 season. Power served in this capacity for five seasons under senior coaches Kevin Sheedy and Leon Cameron.

=== AFL Academy High Performance coach ===
In 2017, Power became the AFL Academy High Performance coach, leading the Underage national team to consecutive victories against New Zealand in 2017,2018 and 2019.

=== Carlton Football Club ===
In September 2019, Power then became an assistant coach at Carlton Football Club in the position of Head of Development, with the primary responsibility being to manage the players' performance and development under senior coach David Teague. However in the middle of the 2021 season, fellow Carlton assistant coach John Barker departed the club because of an external review the club had decided to undertake, to improve its on-field results. Power then replaced Barker to be promoted to a higher assistant coaching position within the Carlton Football Club as the stoppages coach.

In 2021, Power won the AFL’s Assistant Coach of the Year at the AFL Coaches Association awards.

At the end of the 2021 AFL season, Power in his position as assistant coach of Carlton reunited with his former teammate Michael Voss, when Voss was appointed as senior coach of Carlton, therefore, Power was Carlton assistant coach under senior coach Voss.

In 2022, Power was made Head Coach of Carlton's reserves team, which is competing in the VFL.

Power departed the Carlton Football Club at the end of the 2025 AFL season.

=== Western Bulldogs ===
On 25 September 2025, it was announced that Power had joined the Western Bulldogs as an assistant coach in the role of Head of Development under senior coach Luke Beveridge.
