= 1999 AFL Rising Star =

Australian rules football award

1999 Norwich AFL Rising Star
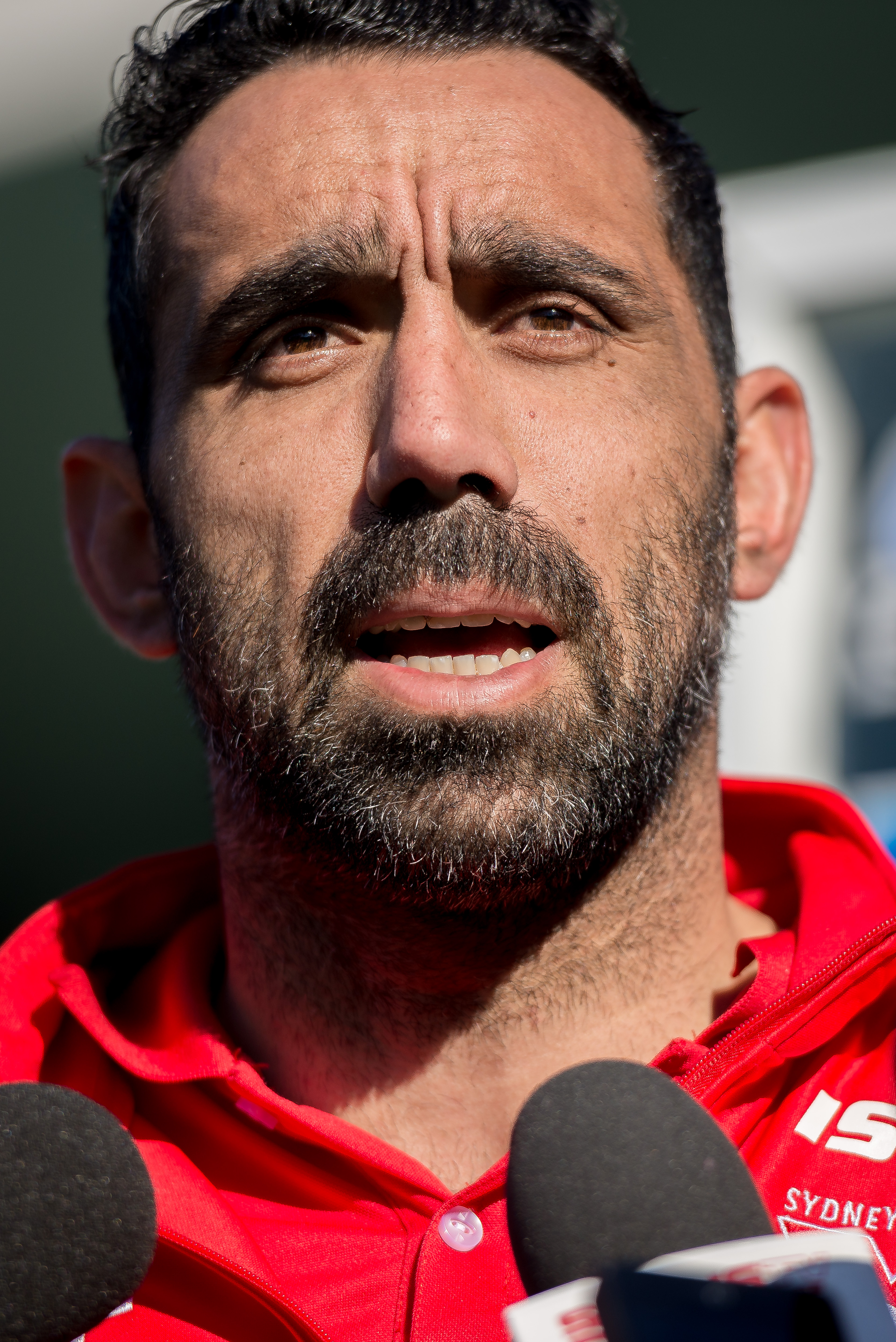
- Adam Goodes, winner of the 1999 AFL Rising Star award, during 2013
- Sponsored by: Norwich
- Country: Australia
- Rising Star: Adam Goodes (Sydney)

The Norwich AFL Rising Star award is given annually to a stand out young player in the Australian Football League. The 1999 medal was won by Sydney player Adam Goodes.

== Eligibility ==
Every round, an Australian Football League rising star nomination is given to a stand out young player. To be eligible for the award, a player must be under 21 on January 1 of that year, have played 10 or fewer senior games and not been suspended during the season. At the end of the year, one of the 22 nominees is the winner of award.

== Nominations ==
| Round | Player | Club |
|---|---|---|
| 1 | Shane O'Bree | Brisbane Lions |
| 2 | Adam Goodes | Sydney |
| 3 | Brett Backwell | Carlton |
| 4 | Troy Longmuir | Melbourne |
| 5 | Nick Davis | Collingwood |
| 6 | David Gallagher | Adelaide |
| 7 | Dean Rioli | Essendon |
| 8 | Rowan Jones | West Coast |
| 9 | Simon Black | Brisbane Lions |
| 10 | Brett Burton | Adelaide |
| 11 | Dean Solomon | Essendon |
| 12 | Andrew Williams | West Coast |
| 13 | Mark Johnson | Essendon |
| 14 | Nathan Thompson | Hawthorn |
| 15 | Andrew Shipp | Fremantle |
| 16 | Marc Dragicevic | Richmond |
| 17 | Luke Power | Brisbane Lions |
| 18 | Paul Licuria | Collingwood |
| 19 | Matthew Bode | Port Adelaide |
| 20 | Ben Mathews | Sydney |
| 21 | Tim Notting | Brisbane Lions |
| 22 | Lenny Hayes | St Kilda |
Source: AFL Record Season Guide 2015

== Final voting ==
| | Player | Club | Votes |
|---|---|---|---|
| 1 | Adam Goodes | Sydney | 33 |
| 2 | Brett Burton | Adelaide | 24 |
| 3 | Simon Black | Brisbane Lions | 22 |
| 4 | Dean Rioli | Essendon | 7 |
| 5 | Luke Power | Brisbane Lions | 5 |
Source: AFL Record Season Guide 2015
