= Jason Saddington =

Australian rules footballer (born 1979)

Personal information
- Full name: Jason Saddington
- Born: 23 October 1979 (age 47)
- Original team: Mitcham / Eastern U18
- Height: 194 cm (6 ft 4 in)
- Weight: 88 kg (194 lb)

Playing career^{1}
Years	Club	Games (Goals)
1998 – 2005	Sydney	142 (41)
2006 – 2008	Carlton	20 (6)
Total		162 (47)
- ^{1} Playing statistics correct to the end of 2008.

Career highlights
- AFL Rising Star nominee: 1998

Jason Saddington (born 23 October 1979) is a retired Australian rules footballer in the Australian Football League.

He was recruited as the number 11 draft pick in the 1997 AFL draft from Eastern Ranges.

== AFL Playing Career ==
=== Sydney Swans ===
Jason made his AFL debut for the Sydney Swans in Round 1, 1998 against Port Adelaide. He had a consistent debut season in 1998 and was nominated for the Norwich Rising Star award that year. He kicked 4 goals against the Kangaroos in Round 4 of 2004 in one of his best matches of his career, and was noted as a consistent rebounding backman with a strong mark. However, a serious knee injury in Round 10, 2004 against the Western Bulldogs interrupted his career and the very slow process of recovery resulted in Jason being traded to the Carlton Football Club at the end of the 2005 season.

Saddington played 142 games in eight seasons at the Sydney Swans from 1998 until 2005 and kicked a total of 41 goals.

=== Carlton ===
Saddington debuted for Carlton against his old club, the Sydney Swans, in Round 3, 2006. He played six consecutive games, scoring two goals, before his season was again ended by the recurring knee injury. It was at this late stage that Saddington was told for the first time that the medical staff at Sydney Swans were aware of complications that had resulted from his first knee injury and had withheld this information from him and also from his new club. He had a further operation, and missed the rest of the 2006 season.

Fully recovered, Saddington played very good football for Carlton's VFL-affiliate, the Northern Bullants, in the early rounds of season 2007 and played his first senior game of the 2007 AFL Season at the MCG against Magpies in Round 7 on Saturday 12 May 2007 taking a team high total of 12 marks. He played his 150th AFL game against the Kangaroos at Carrara Stadium on the Gold Coast the following week. With the replacement of coach Denis Pagan with Brett Ratten, Saddington spent more time as a part-time forward later in the season.

Saddington played only two games for Carlton in 2008, both late in the season. He won the Northern Bullants' best and fairest award, the Laurie Hill Trophy, for his strong season at VFL level during the season. Jason was offered a position in an AFL initiative to assist homeless people.

Saddington officially retired from the AFL as a player on 13 October 2008.

Saddington played for Carlton from 2006 until 2008 for a total of 20 games and kicked a total of 6 goals.

== Post-AFL career and coaching career ==
Saddington continued to play on with the Northern Bullants as a VFL-listed player in 2009, where he was a part of the club's losing grand final team. In 2012, Saddington played for the Balmain Dockers in the Sydney AFL competition alongside premiership players Nick Davis and Chad Fletcher. In 2014, Saddington coached the NSW/ACT Rams and was named Coach of the 2014 NAB AFL U18 All Australian Team. On 23 October 2014 Saddington was announced as new Greater Western Sydney Academy Coach by the AFL.

In January 2020, Saddington was appointed as the Greater Western Sydney reserves team coach for the 2020 NEAFL season. However, the season was cancelled due to the COVID-19 pandemic, meaning he did not coach any games.
