= James Wasley =

Australian rules footballer

Personal information
- Full name: James Wasley
- Born: 19 July 1979 (age 47)
- Original team: Norwood
- Draft: 24th, 1997 AFL draft
- Height: 180 cm (5 ft 11 in)
- Weight: 84 kg (185 lb)

Playing career^{1}
Years	Club	Games (Goals)
1998–2000	Collingwood	23 (3)
- ^{1} Playing statistics correct to the end of 2000.

James Wasley (born 19 July 1979) is a former Australian rules footballer who played with Collingwood in the Australian Football League (AFL).

Wasley played in a variety of positions for Collingwood, after arriving from Norwood in the 1997 AFL draft. He start out as a half forward flanker and wingman but was also used as a defender.

He had a terrible run with injuries during his time in the AFL, which started in 1998 when he suffered stress fractures in his foot. In 1999 he injured a knee and then had shoulder problems in 2000. An ankle injury kept him out of the team for the entire 2001 AFL season and he was delisted by Collingwood.
