= Frank Raso =

Australian rules footballer, born 1979

Personal information
- Born: 12 September 1979 (age 47)
- Original team: Preston RSL/Preston U18
- Debut: Round 1, 28 March 1998, Collingwood vs. Hawthorn, at Melbourne Cricket Ground

Playing career^{1}
| Years | Club | Games (Goals) |
| 1998–1999 | Collingwood | 19 (1) |
- ^{1} Playing statistics correct to the end of 1999.

Frank Raso (born 12 September 1979) is a former Australian rules football player for the Collingwood Football Club.

Raso was mainly used as a running defender coming off the Interchange. He played 19 games for Collingwood in his two years spent at the club between 1998 and 1999, before being delisted. He was drafted to the Magpies in the 1997 AFL draft at a high pick, no.84, recruited from Preston U18s.

After his AFL career, Raso returned to Preston to play Victorian Football League football for the Northern Bullants as an experienced midfielder. He captained the Bullants to their 2006 minor premiership.

In October 2012, Raso was named as coach of the Northern Football League team West Preston Lakeside Roosters for a period of two years.
