= Ben Kinnear =

Australian rules footballer

Personal information
- Born: 27 February 1979 (age 47)
- Original team: Central District (SANFL)
- Debut: Round 9, 24 May 1998, Collingwood vs. Port Adelaide, at Football Park
- Height: 193 cm (6 ft 4 in)
- Weight: 101 kg (223 lb)

Playing career^{1}
| Years | Club | Games (Goals) |
| 1998–2004 | Collingwood | 50 (11) |
- ^{1} Playing statistics correct to the end of 2004.

Ben Kinnear (born 27 February 1979) is a former Australian footballer who played with Collingwood Football Club in the Australian Football League (AFL) and Central District Football Club in the South Australian National Football League (SANFL).

Playing with Central Districts' junior teams, Kinnear was selected with pick 56 in the 1997 AFL draft by Collingwood and was touted as a key forward.

Kinnear made his senior AFL debut in 1998 and had a breakthrough period in 2000–2001 which saw him live up to potential as a key-position player. He could play as a mobile forward, with good hands and had height, and was retained on the list.

Kinnear however played just one game for Collingwood in 2002, where he kicked an infamous pass across the face of goal against Carlton. Playing most of his football with Collingwood's Victorian Football League (VFL) affiliate the Williamstown Seagulls, Kinnear made some senior appearances in 2003, but a serious ankle injury against Richmond saw him stretchered off the ground, and looked like the end of his career. However, Kinnear recovered and returned to the seniors for the 2003 finals and played in the 2003 AFL Grand Final, where Collingwood lost to Brisbane Football Club.

In 2004 he brought up his 50th game in his 7th season, but that was all he would play, prematurely retiring at the end of the season. He won the best and fairest with Lalor in 2005, and took up a playing-Assistant coach role at the grassroots club for 2006.
