= James Walker (Australian footballer) =

Australian rules footballer

Personal information
- Born: 15 January 1979 (age 47)
- Original team: North Ballarat Rebels
- Draft: 6th overall, 1997 National Draft
- Height: 178 cm (5 ft 10 in)
- Weight: 79 kg (174 lb)
- Positions: Midfielder, small defender

Playing career^{1}
Years	Club	Games (Goals)
1998–2007	Fremantle	151 (16)
- ^{1} Playing statistics correct to the end of 2007.

Career highlights
- Fremantle Life Member: 2007

James Walker (born 15 January 1979) is a former Australian rules footballer who played for the Fremantle Football Club in the Australian Football League (AFL). He mainly played as a midfielder or a small defender.

He entered the University of Melbourne in 1997, where he was a resident at Trinity College, and in 2015, he gave the Cordner Oration at Grand Final Breakfast held at Trinity College.

Walker was drafted from the North Ballarat Rebels with the sixth selection in the 1997 National Draft and made his AFL debut against Essendon at Subiaco Oval in round 19, 1998. He played over 150 games for Fremantle, the first Victorian born player to do so. When not selected for the Fremantle side, he played for the Peel Thunder in the West Australian Football League, after initially playing for East Perth.

He won the AFL Grand Final Sprint in 2003 and 2004 and was noted as one of the fastest players in the AFL. He is the great-grandson of Collingwood legend Gordon Coventry.

Walker was delisted by Fremantle at the end of the 2007 season and chose to participate in the 2007–08 Clipper Round the World Yacht Race on board the yacht westernaustralia2011.com for the race leg across the Southern Ocean between Durban and Fremantle.
