= Jason Daniltchenko =

Australian rules footballer (born 1975)

Personal information
- Born: 2 September 1975 (age 51)
- Original team: Bayswater
- Height: 191 cm (6 ft 3 in)
- Weight: 98 kg (216 lb)

Playing career^{1}
Years	Club	Games (Goals)
1993–1997	North Melbourne	29 (18)
1998–1999	Hawthorn	0 (0)
- ^{1} Playing statistics correct to the end of 1999.

Jason Daniltchenko (born 2 September 1975) is an Australian rules footballer who played for North Melbourne in the Australian Football League (AFL).

== Playing career ==
Daniltchenko was part of Eastern Ranges' inaugural squad in the 1992 TAC Cup season. He made his senior AFL debut for North Melbourne in 1993. Between 1993 and 1997 he played 29 matches, scoring 18 goals.

He was selected by Hawthorn in the 1998 AFL preseason draft but did not play a game for the Hawks. He suffered an ACL during a pre-season practice match and missed the entire season. In 1999 he played the entire season with the reserves but got delisted at the end of the season.
