= Kris Massie =

Australian rules footballer and coach

Personal information
- Full name: Kris Massie
- Born: 30 May 1980 (age 46); Sweden
- Original team: Dandenong Stingrays
- Draft: 7th overall, 1997
- Height: 188 cm (6 ft 2 in)
- Weight: 83 kg (183 lb)
- Position: Defender

Playing career^{1}
Years	Club	Games (Goals)
1998–2001	Carlton	43 (12)
2002–2008	Adelaide	88 (11)
Total		131 (23)

Coaching career
Years	Club	Games (W–L–D)
2011–2013	Glenelg (SANFL)	50 (17–33–0)
- ^{1} Playing statistics correct to the end of 2013.

Career highlights
- AFL Rising Star nominee: 1998

Kris Massie (born Kristiaan Martinger, 30 May 1980) is an Australian rules football coach and former player who played for the Carlton Football Club and Adelaide Football Club in the Australian Football League (AFL). He also coached the Glenelg Football Club in the South Australian National Football League (SANFL) from 2011 to 2013.

== AFL career ==
Massie was recruited to the Carlton in the 1997 AFL draft and won a Rising Star nomination in his first AFL season (1998) after debuting less than two weeks before his 18th birthday. As a utility player, Massie failed to live up to his top 10 draft pick status, however, and only managed 43 games in four seasons at Carlton before being traded.

At Adelaide, Massie held his spot in the side late in the 2002 season, and in 2003 again performed well enough to hold his spot for the finals series. 2004 saw him play the first 11 games, but he only managed one more match for the year, in Round 17.

In 2005, Massie had turned 25 and was now an experienced member of the team. Kept in as a depth player, Massie played much of his football with Norwood in the SANFL and only managed three games for the year, including the Qualifying Final. He returned to regular senior selection in 2006, playing 20 games. He missed the first half of 2007 due to injury before coming back for Round 12.

== Post-AFL career ==
Massie was delisted by Adelaide at the end of the 2008 season, and signed to play as a contracted player for Norwood in the SANFL in 2009.

In 2010, Massie moved into coaching, taking the role as the under-18s coach at Glenelg, taking the young Bays to the premiership, then becoming Glenelg's reserves coach in 2011. On 20 June 2011, Glenelg head coach Mark Mickan was sacked by the club following poor onfield performances, and Massie was installed as caretaker season coach for the remainder of the 2011 season, and was appointed as senior coach for the 2012 season. His contract was not renewed at the end of 2013, finishing with a career senior coaching record of 17–33 for Glenelg.

== Personal life ==
Massie was diagnosed with chronic fatigue in 2002. He combatted his diagnosis with the establishment of a small business known as Chi Train. Co-owned with his wife Trace, Massie's business develops healthy lifestyles for their clients. Massie and his wife have three children.
