= Dion Miles =

Australian rules footballer

Personal information
- Full name: Dion Miles
- Born: 9 August 1978 (age 48)
- Original team: Chanel College
- Draft: 62nd, 1997 AFL draft
- Height: 176 cm (5 ft 9 in)
- Weight: 76 kg (168 lb)

Playing career^{1}
Years	Club	Games (Goals)
1998	North Melbourne	2 (1)
- ^{1} Playing statistics correct to the end of 1998.

Dion Miles (born 9 August 1978) is a former Australian rules footballer who played with North Melbourne in the Australian Football League (AFL).

Miles played his early football at Chanel College in Geelong, competed for the Western Jets in the TAC Cup, Teds men’s A-Grade indoor football, and pairs lawn balls with brother Sheldon in Werribee.

A midfielder, he played reserves football with North Melbourne in 1997 and won their best and fairest award.

Miles made his debut for the North Melbourne senior side in round 11 of the 1998 AFL season, against Collingwood at the Melbourne Cricket Ground. He had seven disposals and kicked a goal. His only other appearance in the AFL came the following week, in North Melbourne's loss to Richmond at the same ground.

Later that season, Miles injured his knee and had to have a knee reconstruction. He never played another senior game for his club.

Miles coached Ballarat Football League club Bacchus Marsh from 2007 to 2009. He had earlier coached the East Point Football Club.
