= Shane O'Bree =

Australian rules footballer

Personal information
- Born: 15 March 1979 (age 47); Victoria
- Original teams: Beaufort Football Club; North Ballarat Rebels
- Debut: Round 2, 4 April 1998, Brisbane vs. Sydney Swans, at the SCG

Playing career^{1}
Years	Club	Games (Goals)
1998–1999	Brisbane Lions	19 (3)
2000–2010	Collingwood	227 (84)
Total		246 (87)
- ^{1} Playing statistics correct to the end of 2010.

Career highlights
- AFL Rising Star nominee: 1999

Shane O'Bree (born 15 March 1979) is a former professional Australian rules football player who played for the Brisbane Lions and Collingwood Football Club in the Australian Football League (AFL). He is currently serving as an assistant coach with Geelong.

== Early life ==
Originally from Beaufort in north-west Victoria, via North Ballarat Rebels under 18 side, O'Bree was drafted to the Brisbane in the 1997 National Draft as a first-round selection.

== Career ==
=== Brisbane ===
O'Bree spent two years with Brisbane, debuting in 1998 - but managed only 19 games in his 2 seasons. A ball winning midfielder, he won an AFL Rising Star nomination in the first week of 1999, having 27 touches.

Leigh Matthews, coach of the Brisbane Lions, travelled to O'Bree's hometown of Ballarat during the off season in an attempt to persuade him to remain at Brisbane at the end of the 1999 season. Collingwood coach, Michael Malthouse, was very interested in O'Bree due to his brilliant display in his second AFL season. O'Bree left Brisbane by choice and Collingwood selected O'Bree with their first pick in the 2000 Pre-Season Draft.

=== Collingwood ===
O'Bree had a great first season with the club, showing dominance as a clearance player. He had 498 disposals and then 467 in successive seasons at Collingwood. O'Bree suffered a slow start to 2002 thanks to osteitis pubis, but played in both the 2002 Grand Final and the 2003 Grand Final, once again being a valuable clearance player in the centre. Around this time he also played his 100th game. Steady seasons in both 2004 and 2005 kept him going, despite his lack of speed in a slow midfield outfit, he still found the ball and tackled hard. 2006 saw him play all 23 games and bring up his 150th career game in round 5 against Port Adelaide. He consistently found the ball, having another good season in which he averaged 21 touches per game.

=== Coaching ===
After retiring as a player, he joined the Gold Coast Suns as a midfield assistant coach for their inaugural season in the AFL in 2011.

At the end of the 2012 season, O'Bree moved back to Victoria and joined the Geelong Football Club as a midfield stoppage assistant coach.
