= 1998 AFL Rising Star =

Australian rules football award

1998 Norwich AFL Rising Star
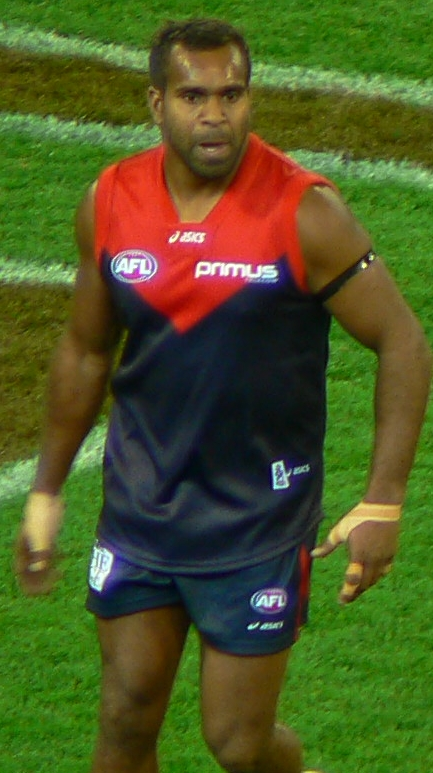
- Byron Pickett, winner of the 1998 AFL Rising Star award, playing for Melbourne during the 2007 AFL season
- Sponsored by: Norwich
- Country: Australia
- Rising Star: Byron Pickett (North Melbourne)

The Norwich AFL Rising Star award is given annually to a standout young player in the Australian Football League. The 1998 medal was won by Kangaroos player Byron Pickett.

== Eligibility ==
Every round, an Australian Football League rising star nomination is given to a standout young player. To be eligible for the award, a player must be under 21 on January 1 of that year, have played 10 or fewer senior games and not been suspended during the season. At the end of the year, one of the 22 nominees is the winner of award.

== Nominations ==
Round	Player	Club
1	Michael Braun	West Coast
2	Luke Power	Brisbane Lions
3	Byron Pickett	North Melbourne
4	Jess Sinclair	Fremantle
5	Jonathan Hay	Hawthorn
6	Evan Hewitt	North Melbourne
7	Warren Tredrea	Port Adelaide
8	Travis Johnstone	Melbourne
9	Nick Stevens	Port Adelaide
10	Darren Hulme	Carlton
11	Jason Saddington	Sydney
12	James Rahilly	Geelong
13	Stuart Dew	Port Adelaide
14	Russell Robertson	Melbourne
15	Justin Plapp	Richmond
16	Jade Rawlings	Hawthorn
17	Jared Crouch	Sydney
18	Trent Croad	Hawthorn
19	Andrew Eccles	Adelaide
20	Kris Massie	Carlton
21	Jason Johnson	Essendon
22	Darren Milburn	Geelong
Source: AFL Record Season Guide 2015

== Final voting ==
	Player	Club	Votes
1	Byron Pickett	North Melbourne	30
2	Nick Stevens	Port Adelaide	19
3	Warren Tredrea	Port Adelaide	13
Source: AFL Record Season Guide 2015
