= Shannon Watt =

Australian rules footballer

Personal information
- Full name: Shannon Watt
- Born: 26 November 1980 (age 45)
- Original team: North Ballarat Rebels
- Draft: 14th overall, 1997 National Draft
- Height: 193 cm (6 ft 4 in)
- Weight: 95 kg (209 lb)
- Position: Defender

Playing career^{1}
Years	Club	Games (Goals)
1998–2009	North Melbourne	155 (9)
- ^{1} Playing statistics correct to the end of 2009.

Shannon Watt (born 26 November 1980) is a former Australian rules footballer for the North Melbourne Football Club in the Australian Football League (AFL).

From Cavendish in rural Victoria, Watt, a key defender, was drafted at number 14 in the 1997 National AFL draft from the North Ballarat Rebels. Watt completed year 12 (final year of school) at University High School whilst in his first year at the club (1998). He played as a fullback until Jonathan Hay came to the club in 2006 who unsuccessfully filled the role of centre half-back.

Despite playing 155 AFL games, Watt never polled a single vote in the Brownlow Medal. Watt was one of the last individuals to have played every minute of every game for an entire season on the ground (no interchange time) in 2003, a feat practically unheard of in the modern era.

He announced his retirement from the game on 20 August 2009.
