= Chris Obst =

Australian rules footballer

Personal information
- Full name: Chris Obst
- Born: 9 October 1979 (age 47)
- Original team: Western Jets
- Draft: 19th, 1997 National Draft
- Height: 185 cm (6 ft 1 in)
- Weight: 80 kg (176 lb)

Playing career^{1}
Years	Club	Games (Goals)
1998–2001	Hawthorn	17 (0)
2002	Sydney Swans	0 (0)
- ^{1} Playing statistics correct to the end of 2001.

Career highlights
- VFL premiership player: 2001

Chris Obst (born 9 October 1979) is a former Australian rules footballer who played with Hawthorn in the Australian Football League (AFL).

Obst was drafted from the Western Jets in the TAC Cup but came from Melton originally. A half back, he was taken by Hawthorn at pick 19 in the 1997 National Draft. He struggled with injuries while at Hawthorn and never managed to play more than six games in a season. In 2001, he was a member of Box Hill's premiership. He was picked up by the Sydney Swans in the 2002 Rookie Draft but would not play a senior game for the club and was delisted at the end of the year. While with the Swans, he began playing for their VFL affiliate Port Melbourne, and he remained there after being delisted, playing over 100 games and captaining the club.
