= Mark Bolton =

Australian rules footballer

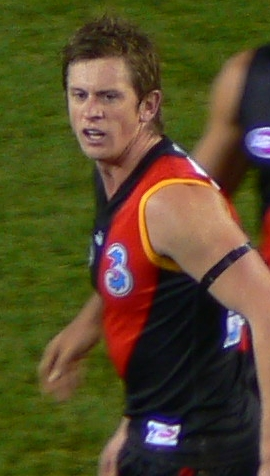

Personal information
- Born: 3 April 1979 (age 47)
- Original team: Ringwood / Eastern U18
- Debut: Round 1, 29 March 1998, Essendon vs. Richmond, at the MCG
- Height: 195 cm (6 ft 5 in)
- Weight: 88 kg (194 lb)

Playing career^{1}
Years	Club	Games (Goals)
1998–2007	Essendon	124 (50)
- ^{1} Playing statistics correct to the end of 2007.

Mark Bolton (born 3 April 1979) is a retired Australian rules footballer.

He was recruited to Essendon with pick 4 in the 1997 National Draft, via Ringwood, Victoria and Eastern U18. He made his debut in 1998 and went on to play 124 games.

He announced his retirement at the 2007 Crichton Medal Count.

Bolton completed his secondary education at Ringwood Secondary College and continued on to complete a Bachelor of Science (Biomedical Science) at Swinburne University of Technology.

Bolton joined University Blacks for season 2010.

Bolton worked as the executive director of Ladder, a non-governmental organisation that enables homeless youth to find housing, jobs and pursue meaningful lives. In 2024 he returned to Essendon as clubs Chief Strategy Officer.

Mark Bolton was ranked 99th in Don The Stat's Best Essendon players since 1980.
