= Sudjai Cook =

Australian rules footballer, born 1976

Personal information
- Full name: Sudjai Cook
- Born: 27 June 1976 (age 50); Bangkok Thailand
- Original team: Norwood
- Height: 176 cm (5 ft 9 in)
- Weight: 79 kg (174 lb)

Playing career^{1}
Years	Club	Games (Goals)
1998	Adelaide	7 (2)
- ^{1} Playing statistics correct to the end of 1998.

Sudjai Cook (born 27 June 1976) is an Australian rules footballer who has played in the Australian Football League for the Adelaide Crows. He also played in the South Australian National Football League.

== Early life ==
Cook was adopted at 10 weeks old from Thailand and moved to Australia.

== AFL career ==
Deciding to embark on a career in Australian rules football, he played 7 games for the Norwood Football Club before being rookie listed in 1998 with the Australian Football League club, Adelaide. Debuting that year after being promoted to the senior list, he had the distinction of being the first Thai-born player ever to play in the AFL. The rover was known for his speed and dubbed "the Chef" by Seven Network commentator Sandy Roberts. He went on to play 7 games for the club before being delisted at the end of the year.

== Post-AFL career ==
Cook played the majority of his SANFL career with the Glenelg Football Club in the SANFL, having transferred to that club from Norwood in 1999. His SANFL career ended in 2005, after 26 games for Norwood and 122 games for Glenelg.

He was an assistant coach for the Broadview Football Club who play in the SAAFL. He was also playing for Broadview at the same time.

He went on to play for Flinders Park in the SAAFL until 2018.
