= Dean Solomon =

Australian rules footballer, born 1980

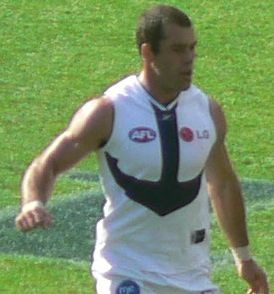

Personal information
- Full name: Dean Solomon
- Born: 9 January 1980 (age 46)
- Original team: Bendigo Pioneers (TAC Cup)
- Draft: No. 20, 1997 national draft
- Debut: Round 5, 1998, Essendon vs. Collingwood, at MCG
- Height: 189 cm (6 ft 2 in)
- Weight: 102 kg (225 lb)
- Position: Midfielder / forward

Playing career
| Years | Club | Games (Goals) |
| 1998–2006 | Essendon | 158 (56) |
| 2007–2009 | Fremantle | 51 (22) |
| Total | | 209 (78) |

Coaching career
| Years | Club | Games (W–L–D) |
| 2017 | Gold Coast | 3 (0–3–0) |
| 2026 | Essendon | 12 (1–11–0) |

Career highlights
- AFL Premiership player: 2000; AFL Rising Star nominee: 1999

Dean Solomon (born 9 January 1980) is a former professional Australian rules footballer who played for the Essendon Football Club and the Fremantle Football Club in the Australian Football League (AFL). Solomon served as the caretaker senior coach of Essendon following the sacking of Brad Scott in May 2026. He also served as caretaker senior coach with Gold Coast for the last three games of the 2017 season, following the departure of senior coach Rodney Eade on 7 August 2017.

== Early career ==
Solomon grew up in the outback mining town of Broken Hill excelling in basketball, cricket and football though it is the latter in which he held the most promise. Playing for the North Broken Hill Football Club, a team with which his family has a long history, he received several honours as a junior, along with several junior premierships, however as a 16-year-old he was awarded "best junior" when playing for the league or A-grade team against many large, hard men who would often attempt to physically intimidate him. Solomon played his last game for North Broken Hill in 1996, unfortunately injuring his fingers and missing a grand final.

Solomon then went on to play for the Bendigo Pioneers in the under 18 TAC Cup competition. He was selected in the 1997 AFL draft by Essendon with a 2nd round selection, number 20 overall.

== Playing career ==
=== Essendon ===
Solomon made his AFL debut in 1998 for Essendon and was part of their 2000 premiership team. Solomon played a total of 158 games and kicked a total of 56 goals for Essendon from 1998 until 2006.

=== Fremantle ===
On 13 October 2006, Solomon was traded to Fremantle, following a trade of draft picks No. 42 and No. 47, Fremantle also gained pick No. 52 from the Bombers. He links up with close friend, forward Chris Tarrant who was traded to the Dockers on the same day from Collingwood.

In 2008, Solomon was reported for elbowing Cameron Ling to the head which resulted in broken cheekbones and eye socket. Solomon received an 8-week suspension, the most severe AFL tribunal penalty in 11 years.

On 18 February 2010, Solomon announced his retirement from AFL football due to a painful degenerative knee injury. Solomon played a total of 51 games and kicked 22 goals for Fremantle from 2007 until 2009.

== Coaching career ==
=== Fremantle ===
Solomon was an assistant coach with Fremantle in the 2010 season under senior coach Mark Harvey. However after one season, Solomon departed the Fremantle Football Club at the end of the 2010 season on 4 August 2010.

=== Gold Coast Suns ===
He joined Gold Coast Suns as an assistant coach in the months before they entered the AFL for the 2011 season.

During the 2017 season, Solomon was appointed caretaker senior coach of Gold Coast Suns, with three matches left to go after Rodney Eade stepped down as Gold Coast Suns senior coach, during the 2017 season, when Eade was told he would not be receiving a contract extension with Gold Coast Suns. The Suns under Solomon went on to lose all three games for the rest of the 2017 season. Solomon was not retained as Gold Coast Suns senior coach at the conclusion of the 2017 season and was replaced by Stuart Dew as Gold Coast Suns senior coach. Solomon however remained at the club as assistant coach.

After nine years of service as an assistant coach, Solomon was sacked at the end of the 2020 season. Upon his departure from the club, and on the advice of Adam Simpson, Solomon decided to take a 12 month sabbatical from the AFL in a bid to further develop himself with an eye on returning to coaching in 2022; during this sabbatical he ran a gym in Kingscliff, New South Wales.

=== Greater Western Sydney ===
On 17 May 2022, it was announced that Solomon would be joining the coaching staff at Greater Western Sydney as part-time assistant coach for the rest of the 2022 season under GWS caretaker senior coach and his former teammate Mark McVeigh, who replaced Leon Cameron after Cameron resigned as GWS senior coach in the middle of the 2022 season after Round 9, 2022. Solomon left GWS Giants at the end of the 2022 season.

=== Tweed Coast Football Club ===
On 9 November 2022, Solomon was appointed senior coach of Tweed Coast Football Club, a club that competes in the Queensland Football Association Division 2 South.

=== Essendon ===
On 23 October 2025, it was announced that Solomon would return to Essendon as an assistant coach under senior coach Brad Scott for the 2026 season. In late May 2026, following round 11, Solomon was appointed as caretaker senior coach of Essendon following Scott's sacking for the remainder of the 2026 season. On 5 August 2026, Solomon announced he would not re-apply for the role of full-time senior coach of Essendon at the end of the 2026 AFL season. Solomon was then replaced by Mark McVeigh as senior coach of Essendon. Solomon departed the Essendon Football Club on 18 September 2026 at the conclusion of the 2026 AFL season.

Return to Gold Coast Suns

On 27 October 2026, Solomon returned to Gold Coast Suns as an assistant coach under senior coach Damien Hardwick.

== Playing statistics ==
Legend
| G | Goals | K | Kicks | D | Disposals | T | Tackles |
| B | Behinds | H | Handballs | M | Marks |

| Season | Team | No. | Games | Totals | | | | | | | Averages (per game) | | | | | | |
| Season | Team | No. | Games | G | B | K | H | D | M | T | G | B | K | H | D | M | T |
|---|---|---|---|---|---|---|---|---|---|---|---|---|---|---|---|---|---|
| 1998 | Essendon | 7 | 7 | 2 | 1 | 38 | 25 | 63 | 12 | 13 | 0.3 | 0.1 | 5.4 | 3.6 | 9.0 | 1.7 | 1.9 |
| 1999 | Essendon | 7 | 19 | 4 | 4 | 139 | 105 | 244 | 61 | 39 | 0.2 | 0.2 | 7.3 | 5.5 | 12.8 | 3.2 | 2.1 |
| 2000 | Essendon | 7 | 25 | 8 | 7 | 196 | 136 | 332 | 115 | 43 | 0.3 | 0.3 | 7.8 | 5.4 | 13.3 | 4.6 | 1.7 |
| 2001 | Essendon | 7 | 24 | 8 | 5 | 208 | 119 | 327 | 101 | 55 | 0.3 | 0.2 | 8.7 | 5.0 | 13.6 | 4.2 | 2.3 |
| 2002 | Essendon | 7 | 0 | — | — | — | — | — | — | — | — | — | — | — | — | — | — |
| 2003 | Essendon | 7 | 24 | 11 | 20 | 243 | 105 | 348 | 103 | 86 | 0.5 | 0.8 | 10.1 | 4.4 | 14.5 | 4.3 | 3.6 |
| 2004 | Essendon | 7 | 23 | 15 | 17 | 245 | 154 | 399 | 79 | 88 | 0.7 | 0.7 | 10.7 | 6.7 | 17.3 | 3.4 | 3.8 |
| 2005 | Essendon | 7 | 16 | 4 | 5 | 130 | 62 | 192 | 65 | 45 | 0.3 | 0.3 | 8.1 | 3.9 | 12.0 | 4.1 | 2.8 |
| 2006 | Essendon | 7 | 20 | 4 | 3 | 146 | 97 | 243 | 72 | 48 | 0.2 | 0.2 | 7.3 | 4.9 | 12.2 | 3.6 | 2.4 |
| 2007 | Fremantle | 6 | 20 | 11 | 10 | 196 | 120 | 316 | 77 | 108 | 0.6 | 0.5 | 9.8 | 6.0 | 15.8 | 3.9 | 5.4 |
| 2008 | Fremantle | 6 | 13 | 7 | 7 | 149 | 71 | 220 | 70 | 36 | 0.5 | 0.5 | 11.5 | 5.5 | 16.9 | 5.4 | 2.8 |
| 2009 | Fremantle | 6 | 18 | 4 | 6 | 144 | 125 | 269 | 60 | 87 | 0.2 | 0.3 | 8.0 | 6.9 | 14.9 | 3.3 | 4.8 |
| Career | | | 209 | 78 | 85 | 1834 | 1119 | 2953 | 815 | 648 | 0.4 | 0.4 | 8.8 | 5.4 | 14.1 | 3.9 | 3.1 |

== Tribunal history ==
| Season | Round | Charge category (level) | Victim | Result | Verdict | Ref(s) |
|---|---|---|---|---|---|---|
| 2004 | 11 | Melee involvement | — | Guilty (accepted fine) | $4,500 fine |
| 2005 | 18 | Melee involvement | — | Guilty (accepted fine) | $2,400 fine |
| 2006 | 8 | Charging (3) | Ben Cousins (West Coast) | Not guilty (won at tribunal) | — |
| 2007 | PS-QF | Striking (1) | Brent Harvey (Kangaroos) | Guilty (early plea) | Reprimand |
| 2007 | 6 | Misconduct (3) | Jason Roe (Brisbane Lions) | Guilty (lost at tribunal) | 1 match suspension |
| 2007 | 21 | Wrestling | Brad Miller (Melbourne) | Guilty (accepted fine) | $900 fine |
| 2008 | 1 | Rough conduct (1) | Shane Wakelin (Collingwood) | Guilty (lost at tribunal) | 2 matches suspension |
| 2008 | 8 | Wrestling | Tom Williams (Western Bulldogs) | Guilty (accepted fine) | $1,800 fine |
| 2008 | 15 | Striking (6) | Cameron Ling (Geelong) | Guilty (direct to tribunal) | 8 matches suspension |

Key:

- PS – Pre-season competition
- EF – Elimination final
- QF – Qualifying final
- SF – Semi-final
- PF – Preliminary final
- GF – Grand final
