= Troy Longmuir =

Australian rules footballer (born 1979)

Personal information
- Full name: Troy John Longmuir
- Born: 27 May 1979 (age 47)
- Original team: West Perth (WAFL)
- Debut: Round 9, 23 May 1998, Melbourne vs. Essendon, at the M.C.G.
- Height: 185 cm (6 ft 1 in)
- Weight: 81 kg (179 lb)

Playing career^{1}
Years	Club	Games (Goals)
1998–1999	Melbourne	17 (3)
2000–2004	Fremantle	55 (36)
2005–2006	Carlton	11 (10)
Total		83 (49)
- ^{1} Playing statistics correct to the end of 2006.

Career highlights
- WAFL premiership: 2003; AFL Rising Star nominee: 1999

Troy John Longmuir (born 27 May 1979) is a former Australian rules footballer in the Australian Football League (AFL). He is the older brother of former Fremantle player Justin Longmuir.

He was recruited as the number-22 draft pick in the 1997 AFL draft from West Perth. He made his AFL debut for the Melbourne Football Club in Round 9, 1998, against Essendon.

Longmuir played a total of 17 games for Melbourne in 1998 and 1999 before being traded to Fremantle at the end of the 1999 season in exchange for the club's second-round draft pick (#19 overall). There he made his debut for the club against Geelong in Round 1, 2000. He was a consistent player during the 2000–2002 seasons, however he dropped out of form in the following two years. Altogether, Longmuir played 55 games for Fremantle between 2000 and 2004. During this time, he was also a part of West Perth's 2003 WAFL premiership team, where he played when not selected for Fremantle.

Following the 2004 AFL season, Longmuir was traded by Fremantle to Carlton, in exchange for a fifth-round draft pick (#67 overall). He made his debut at Carlton in Round 4, 2005, against Port Adelaide. He divided his time between Carlton and its VFL-affiliate, the Northern Bullants, throughout 2005. In 2006, he started the season with the Bullants, and he broke back into the Carlton senior team in Round 10 against Port Adelaide; however, he was injured in the first quarter and did not play again until the VFL finals.

He was delisted by Carlton at the end of 2006 after 11 games. He returned to West Perth in 2007 as a WAFL-listed player. Longmuir retired at the end of 2009 after playing 100 games for the Falcons between 1997 and 2009.
