= Matthew Dennis (Australian footballer) =

Australian rules footballer

Personal information
- Full name: Matthew Dennis
- Born: 11 February 1978 (age 48)
- Original team: Old Brighton
- Draft: No. 42, 1997 National Draft
- Height: 189 cm (6 ft 2 in)
- Weight: 91 kg (201 lb)

Playing career^{1}
Years	Club	Games (Goals)
1998–1999	Hawthorn	5 (0)
- ^{1} Playing statistics correct to the end of 1999.

Matthew Dennis (born 11 February 1978) is a former Australian rules footballer who played with Hawthorn in the Australian Football League (AFL).

A defender, Dennis came to Hawthorn at pick 42 in the 1997 National Draft, from Old Brighton. He played two senior AFL games in 1998 and made three appearances in the 1999 season.

Dennis was a co-founder of the Melbourne-based company Made Group with category leading products NutrientWater, Cocobella coconut water and protein infused dairy brand, Rokeby. He successfully exited the company with a sale to the French dairy company Danone for a reported two billion dollars.
