= Phillip Read =

Australian rules footballer

Personal information
- Born: 20 October 1979 (age 47)
- Original team: East Fremantle (WAFL)
- Debut: Round 1, 27 March 1998, West Coast vs. North Melbourne, at the MCG
- Height: 178 cm (5 ft 10 in)
- Weight: 83 kg (183 lb)

Playing career^{1}
Years	Club	Games (Goals)
1998–2003	West Coast	74 (24)
2004–2006	Melbourne	34 (8)
Total		108 (32)
- ^{1} Playing statistics correct to the end of 2006.

Phil Read (born 20 October 1979) is a former Australian rules footballer for the AFL's West Coast Eagles and Melbourne Football Club.

Read was educated at Wesley College, Perth.

== West Coast Eagles ==
Drafted by the Eagles, Read kicked 12 goals in 21 games in his rookie season. During the "Demolition Derby" in Round 21, 2000, Read was struck numerous times during an attempted fight with Fremantle's Dale Kickett. This started a melee involving a number of players which led to Kickett being suspended for a total of 9 weeks and Read for two with a hefty fine for multiple wrestling offences.

Persistent injury problems forced him to miss the entire 2001 and 2002 seasons before returning in 2003 to play 11 games before being delisted at the end of the season.

== Melbourne career ==
Selected by the Demons in the 2004 Pre-Season draft Read played 21 games in his first season for his new club but hamstring injuries struck again over the next two years and he was restricted to 8 games in 2005.

Read reappeared in the Melbourne seniors midway through the 2006 season but remained a bit-part player for the rest of the year. Despite a string of best-on-ground honors playing for Melbourne's reserve club Sandringham (including a 46 possession game) he was unable to break back into the Melbourne squad for the finals. Read was voted best on ground in Sandringham's Victorian Football League 2006 Grand Final victory over Geelong.

Read was delisted by Melbourne at the end of the 2006 season. He signed with Geelong reserves for the 2007 season.

After signing with Geelong reserves, Phillip Read was then linked to the Subiaco Lions in the WAFL for the 2008 season. Phil Read was crucial in Subiaco's third consecutive Premiership.
