= Justin Wood (footballer) =

Australian rules footballer

Personal information
- Full name: Justin Wood
- Born: 18 December 1979 (age 46)
- Original team: Tassie Mariners (TAC Cup)/Glenorchy (TFL)
- Draft: No. 54, 1997 AFL draft

Playing career^{1}
Years	Club	Games (Goals)
1998	Geelong	7 (5)
- ^{1} Playing statistics correct to the end of 1998.

Justin Wood (born 18 December 1979) is a former Australian rules footballer who played for Geelong in the Australian Football League (AFL) in 1998. He was recruited from the Tassie Mariners in the TAC Cup with the 54th selection in the 1997 AFL draft. He also played for the Glenorchy in the Tasmanian Football League (TFL). He was later rookie listed by Western Bulldogs in the 2000 Rookie Draft, but never played in the AFL for the Bulldogs.
