= Judd Lalich =

Australian rules footballer

Personal information
- Full name: Judd Lalich
- Born: 26 December 1975 (age 50)
- Original team: East Perth
- Height: 193 cm (6 ft 4 in)
- Weight: 89 kg (196 lb)

Playing career^{1}
Years	Club	Games (Goals)
1998–2001	Essendon	17 (4)
- ^{1} Playing statistics correct to the end of 2001.

Judd Lalich (born 26 December 1975) is a former Australian rules footballer with the Essendon Football Club.

He was recruited from East Perth.
