= Essendon v Carlton (1999 AFL preliminary final) =

1999 AFL First Preliminary Final

Carlton	Essendon
16.8 (104)	14.19 (103)
- Date: 18 September 1999
- Stadium: Melbourne Cricket Ground; Melbourne
- Attendance: 80,519

Broadcast in Australia
- Network: Seven Network

The 1999 AFL First Preliminary Final was an Australian rules football match contested between the Essendon Football Club and the Carlton Football Club at the Melbourne Cricket Ground on 18 September 1999. It was staged as part of the 1999 AFL finals series to determine which of the two clubs would qualify for that season's Grand Final.

Essendon entered the match as heavy favourites, but Carlton recorded a narrow upset victory by one point. The match has become one of the most significant moments in the traditional rivalry between the Carlton and Essendon Football Clubs.

== Background ==
The 1999 AFL season was contested by sixteen clubs between March and September 1999. The top eight clubs qualified for the finals series, which was conducted under the McIntyre final eight system.

Essendon (the Bombers) had been the best team throughout the season. The club finished the home-and-away season as the minor premiers, with a win–loss record of 18–4. Essendon comfortably beat eighth seed Sydney by 69 points in the qualifying final, earning a bye in the second week of the finals to advance directly to the preliminary final. Entering the match, Essendon had won eight matches in a row.

Carlton (the Blues), during the home-and-away season, had struggled to reach the finals. After its Round 16 match, a 76-point loss against Essendon, Carlton sat tenth on the ladder, and coach David Parkin publicly called his side a "B-grade team". Eventually, Carlton finished sixth with a win–loss record of 12–10. In its qualifying final at the Gabba, Carlton was comprehensively beaten by third seed Brisbane Lions by 73 points; but Carlton was not eliminated because the seventh and eighth seeds had both lost their qualifying finals. In the semi-final the following week, Carlton defeated fifth seed West Coast by 54 points to progress to the preliminary final; West Coast was the home team, but due to a contract between the AFL and the Melbourne Cricket Club, the match was played at the M.C.G. in Melbourne, instead of Subiaco Oval in Perth.^{N 1}

The winner of the preliminary final would progress to the Grand Final on 25 September, against the Kangaroos, who had won the Second Preliminary Final^{N 2} the previous night.

Because of their respective form-lines, Essendon was an overwhelming favourite to win the preliminary final and progress to the grand final. On the morning of the match, bookmakers were offering odds of $1.18 for an Essendon victory and $4.25 for a Carlton victory.

=== Rivalry ===
In 1999, there was already an existing, strong rivalry between Carlton and Essendon. Together with Collingwood and Richmond, they made up the AFL's "Big Four" – the four most successful Melbourne-based clubs on-field and off-field through the league's history – and as a result there was a natural rivalry between the successful clubs; but, the Carlton–Essendon rivalry particularly intensified after the appointment of Kevin Sheedy as Essendon coach in 1981; it was intensified further by Essendon's upset victory against Carlton in the 1993 Grand Final, and by 1999 it was one of the most celebrated rivalries in the league.

Carlton stirred up the rivalry twice in the week leading up to the match. After the semi-final win against West Coast, Carlton defender Glenn Manton, who began his career with Essendon but had just played his 100th game for Carlton, told his team-mates "I hope we stick it up the Bombers next week" in a post-game speech in the dressing rooms, which happened to be televised. Then, during the week, Carlton president John Elliott attacked Essendon in media for having "cheated" its way to the 1993 premiership – a reference to the fact that Essendon had recently been found guilty of breaching the league's salary cap around that time.^{N 3,}

== Match summary ==
=== First half ===
Carlton kicked to the Punt Road end of the ground in the first quarter. Carlton started strongly, and kicked the first two goals of the match before Essendon kicked its first. Carlton continued to win strongly out of the midfield, and led by more than three goals towards the end of the quarter. A few late behinds to Essendon narrowed the margin to 16 points, the score 6.3 (39) to 3.5 (23).

The gameplay was more even in the second quarter, but only two goals were kicked, both by Carlton: one to Aaron Hamill early in the quarter from a turnover, and one to Lance Whitnall late in the quarter. Essendon had more scoring shots in the quarter, but scored only 0.5 to Carlton's 2.1, to trail by an inaccurate 3.10 (28) to 8.4 (52) at half time.

Carlton had the better of the midfield match-ups throughout the first half, particularly the match-up between Scott Camporeale and Darren Bewick; Camporeale provided much of Carlton's midfield drive, while Bewick did not have an influence. Carlton's Brett Ratten was also prominent, breaking the tag of Joe Misiti. Carlton also used the unexpected tactic of playing defender Glenn Manton as a defensive full-forward on Dustin Fletcher, which resulted in Fletcher's influence being reduced; but, it resulted in defender Stephen Silvagni matching up on Essendon full forward Matthew Lloyd, which worked in Essendon's favour.^{N 4,}

=== Third quarter ===
After two minutes, an error from Carlton's Craig Bradley on a kick-in led directly to a goal to Essendon's Michael Long. This was the start of a fifteen-minute period of play which was dominated by Essendon. Essendon hit the lead after only nine minutes, and over the fifteen minutes the Bombers went inside-50 eleven times and kicked six goals, while Carlton went inside-50 only once for no score. Essendon had more opportunities to extend the lead shortly afterwards, but Lloyd, Fletcher and Dean Rioli all missed set-shots from inside 50m. Carlton was able to break Essendon's run with late goals, but overall Essendon kicked 7.7 to Carlton's 2.2 in the third quarter, and led 10.17 (77) to 10.6 (66) at three-quarter time.

Essendon's resurgence and dominance in the third quarter came when the team began to win in the midfield, particularly through the efforts of Michael Long and Darren Bewick. After the match-up between Camporeale and Bewick had favoured Carlton in the first half, Essendon coach Kevin Sheedy moved Chris Heffernan onto Camporeale, which both limited Camporeale's influence and freed up Bewick. Dean Rioli kicked two goals during Essendon's revival.

=== Final Quarter ===
Essendon's Steven Alessio kicked the opening goal of the final quarter to extend the lead to 17 points, before Carlton kicked the next four goals – to Fraser Brown, Anthony Koutoufides, Matthew Lappin, and Koutoufides again – to take the lead by seven points. Koutoufides sparked the Carlton revival, moving into the midfield for the final quarter, and winning several clearances. Additionally, after Bewick had been influential in the midfield in the third quarter, retiring Carlton tagger Matthew Hogg (who had spent much of the match on the bench) was moved onto him, limiting him to only one disposal in the final quarter.

Lloyd kicked the next two goals, for a personal match tally of five, to regain the lead for Essendon by less than a goal. Carlton scored the next two goals after that – the first to Hamill, the second to Whitnall from outside 50m, and in both cases assisted by Hogg – to regain the lead by 8 points early in time-on. Essendon attacked hard, but its forward thrusts were repeatedly repelled by Carlton's defence, including Koutoufides, who had dropped back. With 2:18 remaining on the timekeepers' clock, Mark Johnson kicked a goal for Essendon, to narrow the margin to two points.

With 55 seconds remaining, Mark Mercuri gathered the ball from a broken marking contest 25m in front of the Essendon goals; his quick, bouncing snap shot for goal narrowly missed to the left, reducing the margin to one point. Bradley's kick-in was marked strongly on Essendon's right half-forward flank by Essendon's Barry Young, who kicked the ball back to the goal-face. It was cleared hurriedly by Carlton's Dean Rice, but Rice's kick went straight to Essendon's Dean Wallis, who was unmarked in the centre circle. With 38 seconds remaining, Wallis advanced and tried to baulk around Fraser Brown, but Brown tackled him to the ground and the ball spilled free. Carlton cleared the ball forward, ending with a mark to Justin Murphy, who was able to run out the clock preparing for a set shot. Murphy had the ball in his hands when the siren sounded, and Carlton won by one point.

== Notable moments ==
Two moments in the match are best remembered: Anthony Koutoufides' final quarter, and Fraser Brown's last-minute tackle on Dean Wallis.

Koutoufides was instrumental to Carlton's victory in the final quarter. He moved into the midfield at the start of the quarter, won clearances, and drifted forward to kick two goals. After his second goal, he started dropping into the backline after contesting the centre bounces, where he took three contested marks to repel Essendon's attacks. He had ten kicks, two handpasses, six marks and two goals for the quarter; in a special analysis done for the game, Koutoufides would have earned 127 Champion Data ranking points for the quarter.^{N 5,} After the match, club legend (and later, president) Stephen Kernahan described Koutoufides' performance as "the greatest quarter of football ever played". Years later, it is still regarded as one of the greatest ever individual performances in finals matches.

Fraser Brown's tackle on Dean Wallis is widely remembered as the decisive single moment of the match. Brown later said that he had anticipated that Wallis would try to baulk around him, and was fortunate enough to guess the direction correctly.

After Carlton had surrendered the lead in the third quarter, vice-captain Stephen Silvagni delivered an impromptu three-quarter time address to his team-mates. Silvagni took almost the entire three-quarter time break, and coach David Parkin had little time left to deliver his coach's address. Parkin later described it as "the most emotional and appropriately-timed inspirational talk" he'd ever heard a player deliver.

Essendon was left to lament its inaccuracy in front of goals. Essendon had 33 scoring shots to Carlton's 24, but lost the match. Mark Mercuri and Blake Caracella, normally very accurate goalkickers, scored 0.7 between them.

== Aftermath ==
Carlton progressed to the 1999 AFL Grand Final the following week against the Kangaroos. Essendon became the first minor premiers to miss the grand final since 1983. It was Essendon's second one-point loss in a preliminary final in just four years, after the Sydney Swans defeated them in 1996, courtesy of an after-the-siren behind to Tony Lockett.

In the lead-up to the grand final during the week, Aaron Hamill was cited on video evidence for kneeing Dean Wallis in the head while the latter was on the ground during the third quarter. Hamill was found guilty and the AFL Tribunal initially suspended him for two matches, which would have seen him miss the grand final. Carlton then successfully appealed the suspension, using the testimony of biomechanics experts to convince the appeals board that the contact was accidental; years later, Hamill admitted to kneeing Wallis deliberately, and described the biomechanics testimony as "a tactic to bore the hell out of the appeals board". Wallis was reported on the day for striking Michael Sexton in the first quarter, but was cleared by the tribunal.

In the grand final, Carlton was unable to keep up with the Kangaroos through the game, trailing by 20 points at half time, then 43 points at three-quarter time. The final score was Kangaroos 19.10 (124) d. Carlton 12.17 (89).

Essendon coach Kevin Sheedy forced the losing preliminary final team to attend the grand final as spectators as a motivational tactic, an experience described by midfielder Joe Misiti as the worst experience of his life. Essendon went on to dominate the 2000 AFL season, with an all-time record win–loss record of 24–1 for the season (including finals), winning the premiership, the minor premiership, the pre-season competition, and winning a preliminary final rematch against Carlton by 45 points.

== Legacy ==
The 1999 Preliminary Final caused a significant shift in the dynamic of the rivalry between Carlton and Essendon. Across the previous twenty years, the results of the rivalry – including the 1993 Grand Final, the close games and the controversies – had overwhelmingly favoured Essendon. However, the 1999 Preliminary Final result was seen as such a triumph for Carlton that it has become the defining event of the rivalry.

The fact that Carlton went on to lose the grand final to the Kangaroos is typically seen as irrelevant in the context of this game and the rivalry; by preventing the highly fancied Bombers from winning the premiership, the win is compared with and often treated like a premiership by Carlton fans. In 2007, Herald Sun columnist Trevor Grant humorously referred to the win as Carlton's "prelimiership". Coach David Parkin has commented that he is asked about this match at least as often as any of the grand finals he coached during his long career.

== Scorecard ==
First Preliminary Final
18 September 1999, 2:30 pm	Essendon	def. by	Carlton	MCG (crowd: 80,519)
3.5 (23); 3.10 (28); 10.17 (77); 14.19 (103)	Q1; Q2; Q3; Final	6.3 (39); 8.4 (52); 10.6 (66); 16.8 (104)	Umpires: Andrew Coates, Brett Allen, John Harvey; Television broadcast: Seven Network
Lloyd 5 Moorcroft, Rioli 2 Long, Heffernan, Alessio, Johnson, Young 1	Goals	3 Whitnall, Hamill; 2 Lappin, Brown, Koutoufides; 1 Massie, Camporeale, Manton, Allan
Long, Misiti, Fletcher, Lloyd, Heffernan	Best	Koutoufides, Ratten, Brown, Hamill, Whitnall
Wallis, reported by umpire Coates for striking Sexton in the first quarter	Reports	Hamill, reported on video evidence for kneeing Wallis in the third quarter

== Teams ==
Essendon
B:	28 Mark Johnson	31 Dustin Fletcher	6 Sean Wellman
HB:	11 Damien Hardwick	21 Dean Wallis	7 Dean Solomon
C:	26 Chris Heffernan	24 Joe Misiti	33 Blake Caracella
HF:	35 Barry Young	16 Paul Barnard	43 Dean Rioli
F:	2 Mark Mercuri	18 Matthew Lloyd	13 Michael Long
Foll:	19 Peter Somerville	32 Justin Blumfield	8 Darren Bewick
Int:	30 Mark Fraser	15 Michael Prior	27 Steven Alessio
Int:	29 Gary Moorcroft		
Coach:	Kevin Sheedy		

Carlton
B:	23 Dean Rice	1 Stephen Silvagni	15 Ben Nelson
HB:	5 Andrew McKay	43 Anthony Koutoufides	21 Craig Bradley (c)
C:	14 Michael Sexton	7 Brett Ratten	3 Kris Massie
HF:	36 Aaron Hamill	8 Lance Whitnall	18 Justin Murphy
F:	12 Matthew Lappin	22 Glenn Manton	29 Simon Beaumont
Foll:	24 Matthew Allan	20 Fraser Brown	16 Scott Camporeale
Int:	33 Matthew Hogg	39 Ang Christou	30 Adam White
Int:	31 Simon Fletcher		
Coach:	David Parkin		

== See also ==
- 1999 AFL season
- 1999 AFL Grand Final
- Carlton–Essendon AFL rivalry

== Footnotes ==
1. The contract then in place between the AFL and the MCC required that one finals match be played at the M.C.G. each week during the finals. Brisbane and West Coast had both earned the right to host a semi-final, so the semi-final of the lower-seeded team (West Coast) was moved to Melbourne.
2. The First and Second Preliminary Finals are named based on the teams competing in them, not based on the chronological order in which they take place. See McIntyre final eight system for more information.
3. At the time of this game, Carlton, under Elliott's guidance, had also been breaching the salary cap; but this scandal was not revealed until three years later, at the end of the 2002 season.
4. History shows that in 1999, Matthew Lloyd was Essendon's best forward, and Stephen Silvagni was Carlton's best defender. However, Silvagni had a weakness against Lloyd's strong leading style of play, so Glenn Manton was Carlton's usual preferred match-up for Lloyd.
5. Champion Data ranking is a statistical method developed during the 2000s and best known for its use in the Supercoach fantasy football competition. A score of 127 is considered to be an excellent score for an entire match, so for Koutoufides to have earned this score in just the final quarter highlights his dominance.
