= Carlton–Essendon rivalry =

Australian rules football rivalry

Carlton–Essendon Rivalry
- Carlton Essendon
- First meeting: Essendon 12.6.78 def Carlton 6.5.41 (24 May 1897)
- Latest meeting: Carlton 11.12.78 def Essendon 11.4.70 (8 June 2025)
- Next meeting: TBC

Statistics
- Total meetings: 253
- All-time series (AFL only): Carlton 129 wins Essendon 119 wins Draws 6
- Largest victory: Essendon – 109 points (4 May 1985)

The rivalry between the Carlton and Essendon football clubs is one of the most celebrated rivalries in the Australian Football League.

== The Birth of the Modern Rivalry ==
There are conflicting views on how far the rivalry between Essendon and Carlton stretches. However, the intensity of the rivalry today can be traced directly back to 1981. Carlton and one of its strongest traditional rivals, Richmond, had enjoyed considerable success through the 1970s, while Essendon had endured mediocrity. In 1981, former Richmond player Kevin Sheedy, took the role as coach at Essendon (a role he would ultimately fill for 27 years), and he brought his dislike of Carlton with him to his new club.

The significance of 1981 is highlighted by the memorable and controversial finish to the teams' second meeting that season, which was held at Princes Park. With twenty minutes elapsed in the final quarter, Carlton held a 26-point lead; but, Essendon kicked four goals in the remaining twelve minutes to win the match by one point. The controversy came when, with the margin still at 14 points, Carlton's Mike Fitzpatrick conceded a free kick in defence for the rarely applied infringement of wasting time; that free kick resulted in a behind, and therefore did not have a direct influence the result, but it is the incident from which this game is mostly remembered. That match was the second in a string of ten consecutive wins by Essendon against Carlton.

Since then, two matches (resulting in one upset victory to each team) most strongly define the rivalry between the clubs. The first was the 1993 Grand Final, when Carlton was a strong favourite to win, but was comprehensively beaten by 44 points by a notably young, inexperienced Essendon team known as the "Baby Bombers". The second was the 1999 Preliminary Final, when Essendon was an even stronger favourite to win, but was beaten by a single point by a Carlton team whose form throughout the season had been inconsistent.

Including the two key games, the three decades of the modern incarnation of the rivalry from 1981 until 2015 has seen several memorable, close games, including four drawn matches, five matches decided by a single point, and a total of 18 matches decided by one goal or less.

== Madden Cup ==
In 1998, the clubs established the Madden Cup as an annual prize for matches between the two clubs. The Madden Cup is named in honour of brothers Simon Madden – who played 378 games for Essendon, winning two premierships, four best and fairests, and a Norm Smith Medal – and Justin Madden – who played 45 games for Essendon and 287 games for Carlton, winning two premierships and two best and fairests. The establishment of the trophy coincided with Justin's retirement in 1997. The two clubs usually play each other twice during the home-and-away season, but the Madden Cup is contested only once per year: in the Carlton home game during odd-numbered years, and in Essendon home game during even-numbered years.

== Head to head ==
Since joining the VFL in 1897, Essendon and Carlton have faced off 253 times (as of the end of the 2025 AFL season).

Head To Head Results
| Clubs | Home and Away | Finals | Grand Finals | Total |
|---|---|---|---|---|
| Carlton | 121 | 7 | 3 | 131 |
| Essendon | 109 | 7 | 3 | 119 |
| Draws | 6 | 0 | 0 | 6 |
| Played | 236 | 14 | 6 | 256 |

=== Finals ===
In 112 years, the two clubs have played in 20 Finals against each other.

Their first meeting in a final was in the 1904 Semi Final, and this was the only time that Carlton and Essendon played against each other at Victoria Park, which was Collingwood's home ground. Carlton won by 3 points before going on to lose the 1904 Grand Final to Fitzroy.

The most recent final played between the clubs was the 2011 Elimination Final, which Carlton won by 62 points. Before this was the 2000 Preliminary Final, which Essendon won by 45 points. In 1999, Carlton won a one-point thriller in a famous preliminary final.

=== Grand Finals ===
Essendon and Carlton have contested six Grand Finals, most recently in 1993. Each team has won three of these encounters.

==== 1908 ====
| Team | 1 Qtr | 2 Qtr | 3 Qtr | Final |
|---|---|---|---|---|
| Carlton | 2.3 | 5.4 | 5.5 | 5.5 (35) |
| Essendon | 1.1 | 2.4 | 3.5 | 3.8 (26) |
Crowd: 50,261 at the MCG.

==== 1947 ====
| Team | 1 Qtr | 2 Qtr | 3 Qtr | Final |
|---|---|---|---|---|
| Carlton | 4.0 | 8.0 | 10.4 | 13.8 (86) |
| Essendon | 3.7 | 8.11 | 10.15 | 11.19 (85) |
Crowd: 85,815 at the MCG.

==== 1949 ====
| Team | 1 Qtr | 2 Qtr | 3 Qtr | Final |
|---|---|---|---|---|
| Carlton | 2.4 | 2.10 | 3.12 | 6.16 (52) |
| Essendon | 3.3 | 7.7 | 12.15 | 18.17 (125) |
Crowd: 90,453 at the MCG.

==== 1962 ====
| Team | 1 Qtr | 2 Qtr | 3 Qtr | Final |
|---|---|---|---|---|
| Carlton | 1.1 | 5.6 | 7.8 | 8.10 (58) |
| Essendon | 6.5 | 7.7 | 10.10 | 13.12 (90) |
Crowd: 98,385 at the MCG.

==== 1968 ====
| Team | 1 Qtr | 2 Qtr | 3 Qtr | Final |
|---|---|---|---|---|
| Carlton | 2.2 | 6.8 | 7.9 | 7.14 (56) |
| Essendon | 2.1 | 5.1 | 6.4 | 8.5 (53) |
Crowd: 116,828 at the MCG.

==== 1993 ====
| Team | 1 Qtr | 2 Qtr | 3 Qtr | Final |
|---|---|---|---|---|
| Carlton | 1.2 | 5.2 | 10.5 | 13.11 (89) |
| Essendon | 5.9 | 10.9 | 16.11 | 20.13 (133) |
Crowd: 96,862 at the MCG.

== Memorable moments ==
=== The 1981 Escort Cup ===
On 14 July 1981, 42,269 people witnessed Essendon win the 1981 Escort Cup over Carlton at Waverley Park. To date this is the only pre-season/night series Grand Final played between the two clubs.

Essendon 9.11 (65) defeated Carlton 6.5 (41)

=== The 1983 Elimination Final ===
This match would symbolise the upcoming of the Essendon Football Club in the 1980s. In front of more than 65,000 people at Waverley Park, Essendon would go on to knock out the reigning Premiers before making 3 consecutive Grand Finals.

Essendon 17.12 (114) defeated Carlton 12.9 (81)

=== Round 2, 1993 ===
The highest scoring draw in the history of the VFL/AFL, Carlton and Essendon were tied when the final siren sounded and with the ball in the hands of Stephen Kernahan. His kick after the siren, from 35-40m on a wide angle, famously went out on the full.

Carlton 19.18 (132) drew Essendon 20.12 (132)

=== The 1993 Qualifying Final ===
The qualifying final between the top two teams was the first Saturday night finals match in AFL history. More than 79,000 people were in attendance, and there was never more than a goal the difference at the end of any quarter.

Carlton 15.10 (100) defeated Essendon 14.14 (98)

=== The 1999 Preliminary Final ===
Minor premier Essendon was an overwhelming favourite to easily beat sixth-placed Carlton in the preliminary final to progress to the Grand Final against the Kangaroos. In a tight final quarter, Carlton's Anthony Koutoufides starred, while Fraser Brown made a match-saving tackle on Essendon's Dean Wallis in the final minute to seal an upset one-point victory.

Carlton 16.8 (104) defeated Essendon 14.19 (103)

=== Round 20, 2000 ===
Essendon was on a nineteen-game winning streak, having not been beaten since the previous year's preliminary final. Carlton was second on the ladder with a record of 15–4, having had a thirteen-game winning streak broken only the previous week. The result was a Friday night match with a crowd of 91,571, the highest-ever crowd for a night match or a Carlton match during the home-and-away season. The game itself was close right up until the final quarter, when Essendon kicked seven goals to three to win.

Essendon 16.13 (109) defeated Carlton 12.11 (83)

=== The 2000 Preliminary Final ===
The sides met on Preliminary Final weekend again, and Essendon got its revenge for the previous year's heartbreak. Essendon was on top from the beginning, and they put the game beyond doubt with six goals to one in the third quarter.

Essendon 18.17 (125) defeated Carlton 12.8 (80)

=== Round 2, 2005 ===
After Carlton were behind Essendon by seven goals in the game, a seven-goal onslaught in the last quarter by the Blues snatched the game from the Bombers. The Blues started strongly to lead in the opening quarter but the Bombers controlled the middle quarters to take a 28-point lead at three quarter time. Before Carlton made a comeback in the last quarter of the game to win by a final score of Carlton 16.14 110 to Essendon 17.4 106.

=== Round 16, 2006 ===
In the near-opposite circumstances of the highly anticipated match from Round 20, 2000, both teams were sitting at the bottom of the ladder. After both sides won their Round 1 games, the following fourteen rounds yielded no wins and a (then–)club record losing streak for Essendon, and only one win (against the Bombers in round seven) for Carlton. The match became known in the media as the "Bryce Gibbs Cup", under the expectation that the loser of the game would ultimately finish last, receiving the first draft pick, which was expected to be used on the young Glenelg midfielder Bryce Gibbs. Close all day, the game finished in a draw.

Essendon 16.9 (105) drew Carlton 15.15 (105)

=== Round 3, 2007 ===
Carlton staged one of its greatest comebacks to beat Essendon in this match. In time-on in the second quarter, Carlton trailed Essendon by 48 points. Three late goals in the second quarter dragged the margin back to 30 points. Then, seven goals to one in the third quarter saw Carlton ahead by 7 points at three-quarter time. A see-sawing final quarter ended with a three-point win to the Blues. The revival was sparked by Brendan Fevola, who kicked 8 goals.

Carlton 18.17 (125) defeated Essendon 17.20 (122)

=== Round 4, 2011 ===
After Carlton had led by one point in the final moments of the match, Kade Simpson in trying to clear the Essendon defence put the ball out on the full, resulting in a turnover in which Essendon, through David Zaharakis just missed a shot at goal on the run. Minutes earlier, Essendon's Dustin Fletcher tackled Carlton's Jeff Garlett as he played on in front of goal, saving a potential goal. Carlton 11.13 (79) drew Essendon 11.13 (79)

=== The 2011 Elimination Final ===
After Essendon had the early lead in the first quarter, Chris Judd inspired Carlton to a comfortable Carlton 21.23 (149) def Essendon 13.9 (87). Carlton's third consecutive elimination final appearance presented the opportunity for their first victory in a final since 2001. Pitted against the arch enemy Essendon in front of a near-capacity MCG crowd, big questions were being asked of the playing group.

=== Round 4, 2020 ===
The game was close all day and would not be decided until the dying seconds of the match. With the Bombers trailing by two points with less than a minute to spare in Saturday night's low-scoring encounter, Eddie Betts gave a 50-metre penalty away as Bomber Adam Saad went to kick in from a behind. Saad was taken to the middle of the ground, where he bombed forward to a pack of players, with teammate Jacob Townsend marking and kicking for goal – and the game – from 50 metres out with seconds to go. It was a good-looking kick; however, it fell just short and was rushed through for a point, with the match ending at Carlton 7.10 (52) def Essendon 8.3 (51)

=== The first AFLW match: Round 2, 2022 ===
The two sides faced each other in the AFL Women's competition for the first time in round two of AFL Women's season seven at North Port Oval on Sunday 4 September. Despite a goal and 21 disposals to Maddy Prespakis, an Essendon comeback from 21 points down in the final quarter fell just short as Carlton hung on for a one-point win.

Carlton 5.2 (32) defeated Essendon 4.7 (31).

== Players ==
=== Justin Murphy ===
Journeyman Justin Murphy spent time at four AFL clubs, but he spent the longest time at Carlton. It was Murphy who was holding the ball (before famously throwing it up in the air in celebration) as the final siren sounded in Carlton's 1999 Preliminary Final victory over Essendon. Murphy ultimately would spend the final two years of his AFL career at Essendon.

=== Scott Camporeale ===
After 233 games in the navy blue, one of Carlton's favourite sons, Scott Camporeale, walked out on the club. After the 2005 season, Carlton tried to make it difficult for Scott to leave by not releasing him to train with Essendon (his desired club). He nominated for the pre-season draft, where, Essendon picked up Camporeale as expected with pick 4 in the 2005 pre-season draft. Camporeale debuted with Essendon in Round 1, 2006. After 19 games over two seasons at Essendon, Camporeale retired and joined Essendon's coaching staff, where worked as an assistant coach until 2010.

=== Adam Saad ===
Originally having played for the Gold Coast Suns, Adam Saad joined Essendon ahead of the 2018 season on a three-year deal. Saad cited the close proximity of Essendon's headquarters, The Hangar in Tullamarine, to his family as his reason for seeking out Essendon to see if they'd be interested in recruiting him.

Following his impressive first two seasons, in which he placed fourth and third in the club's Best & Fairest award, Saad and Essendon opened contract talks on the eve of the 2020 season about a long-term extension, with a four-year deal expected to be agreed in the short term. However, after round 1 of the season, the league was forced to shut itself down indefinitely due to the COVID-19 pandemic, with the AFL placing an indefinite embargo on any new player contracts as it sought to come to terms with the financial ramifications of the situation. The AFL resumed its season in early June, but did not lift the contract embargo until mid-July. Essendon struggled for form during this period, and by the time the contract embargo had been lifted, Saad was less sure about re-signing with the Bombers than he had been in March.

At the end of the season, Saad shocked Essendon by requesting a trade to their fierce rivals, Carlton, only three years after seeking out Essendon to recruit him.

=== Maddy Prespakis ===
During the 2022 AFL Women's off season, former AFL Women's number three draft pick, and 2020 best-and-fairest winner, Maddy Prespakis left Carlton and joined expansion side Essendon as a new player signing in April 2022.
