= SuperCoach =

SuperCoach may refer to:

- AFL SuperCoach
- NRL SuperCoach
