= Freddy Lussick =

Australian rugby league player

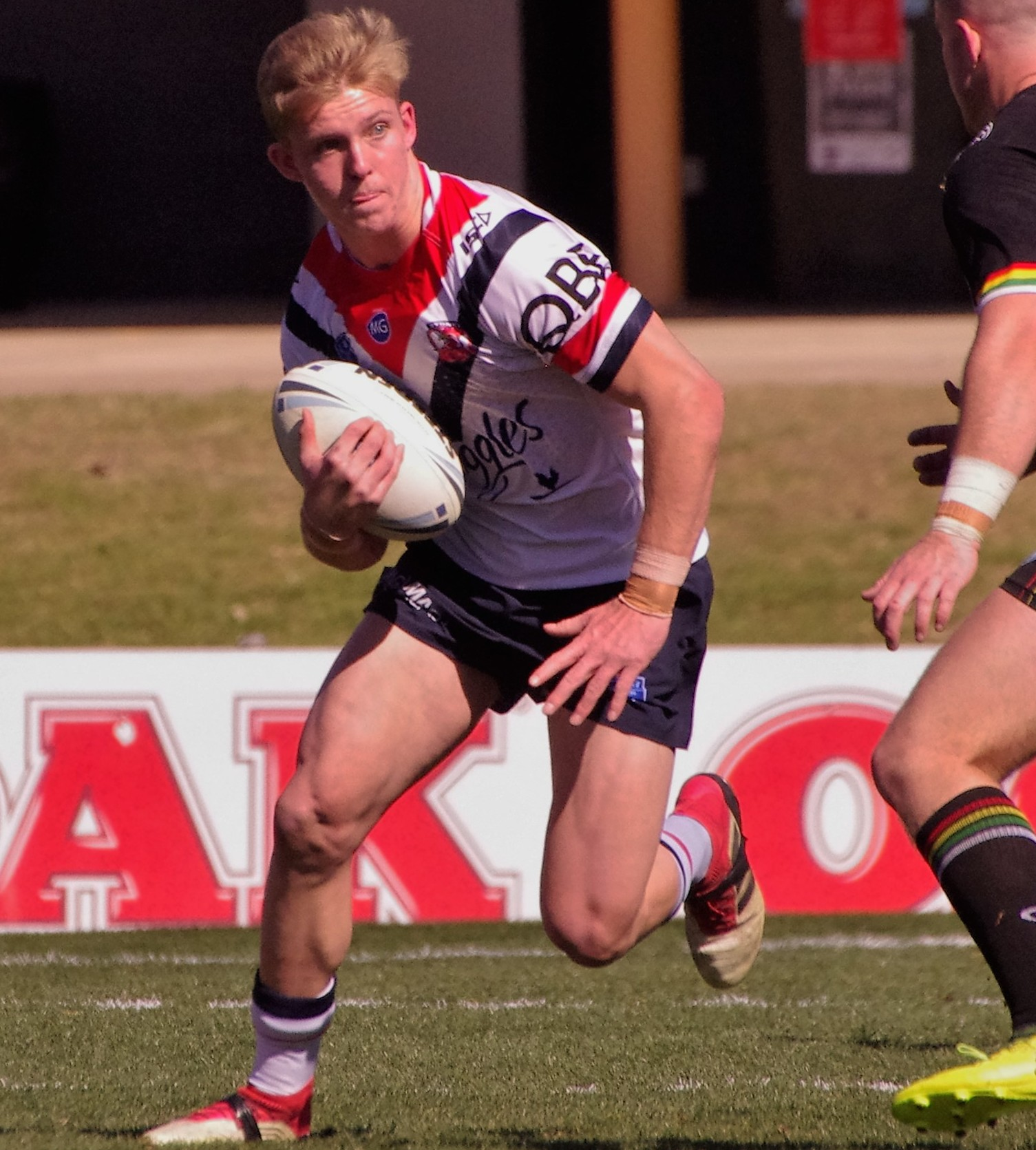

Personal information
- Full name: Frederick Lussick
- Born: 28 August 2000 (age 26) Beacon Hill, New South Wales, Australia
- Height: 180 cm (5 ft 11 in)
- Weight: 84 kg (13 st 3 lb)

Playing information
- Position: Hooker, Lock
Club
| Years | Team | Pld | T | G | FG | P |
|---|---|---|---|---|---|---|
| 2020–21 | Sydney Roosters | 9 | 1 | 0 | 0 | 4 |
| 2021 | St. George Illawarra | 2 | 0 | 0 | 0 | 0 |
| 2022–25 | New Zealand Warriors | 39 | 2 | 0 | 0 | 8 |
| 2026 | Penrith Panthers | 20 | 4 | 0 | 0 | 16 |
| | Total | 70 | 7 | 0 | 0 | 28 |
- Source: 28 August 2026
- Relatives: Darcy Lussick (brother); Joey Lussick (brother)

Freddy Lussick (born 28 August 2000) is an Australian professional rugby league footballer who plays as a hooker for the Canterbury-Bankstown Bulldogs in the National Rugby League (NRL).

He previously played for the Sydney Roosters and the St. George Illawarra Dragons in the NRL.

== Background ==
Freddy is the youngest brother of professional rugby league players, Darcy Lussick and Joey Lussick.

Before making his first grade debut for the Sydney Roosters, Lussick played in the NSW Cup for North Sydney.

== Career ==
=== 2020 ===
Lussick made his first grade debut in round 15 of the 2020 NRL season for the Sydney Roosters against the Wests Tigers.

=== 2021 ===
Lussick made his debut for St. George Illawarra Dragons in Round 24 for a loan deal replacing Andrew McCullough. He did 2 offloads and thirty one tackles for St. George Illawarra. He ran a total of 57 meters. Lussick only got 32 Fantasy Points in NRL Fantasy. Lussick lost both of his games in Round 24 and 25.

=== 2022 ===
Lussick made a total of 11 appearances for the New Zealand Warriors in the 2022 NRL season as they finished 15th on the table.

=== 2023 ===
Lussick played 14 games for the New Zealand Warriors in the 2023 NRL season as the club finished 4th on the table and qualified for the finals. Lussick played in the clubs qualifying final loss against Penrith.

=== 2024 ===
In round 5 of the 2024 NSW Cup season, Lussick was placed on report and immediately referred to the judiciary after he was placed on report for a nasty tackle on South Sydney's Lachlan Ilias which left the player with a fractured tibia. Lussick was later handed a four-game suspension over the incident. Lussick played 15 games for the New Zealand Warriors in the 2024 NRL season which saw the club finish 13th on the table.

=== 2025 ===
Lussick was limited to just two matches with New Zealand in the 2025 NRL season as the club finished 6th on the table and qualified for the finals. They were eliminated by Penrith in the first week of the finals. On 28 September, he played in New Zealand's 30-12 NSW Cup Grand Final victory over St. George Illawarra. On 25 November 2025, the Warriors announced that Lussick was released from the final year of his contract and had returned to Australia and signed with the Penrith Panthers.

=== 2026 ===
In Early October it was reported that Lussick had departed the Panthers and signed a two year deal with the Bulldogs. On 6 October, the Bulldogs announced that they had signed Lussick.

== Statistics ==
| Year | Team | Games | Tries | Pts |
|---|---|---|---|---|
| 2020 | Sydney Roosters | 5 | 1 | 4 |
| 2021 | Sydney Roosters | 4 | | |
| 2021 | St. George Illawarra Dragons (loan) | 2 | | |
| 2022 | New Zealand Warriors | 11 | | |
| 2023 | New Zealand Warriors | 12 | 1 | 4 |
| 2024 | New Zealand Warriors | 14 | 1 | 4 |
| 2025 | New Zealand Warriors | 2 | | |
| 2026 | Penrith Panthers | 20 | 4 | 16 |
| 2027 | Canterbury-Bankstown Bulldogs | | | |
| | Totals | 70 | 7 | 28 |
