= Fantasy football =

Fantasy football may refer to:

- Fantasy football (association), a game in which participants assemble an imaginary team of real-life football players and score points based on those players' actual statistical performance or their perceived contribution on the field of play
- Fantasy football (Australian rules), a type of fantasy sport in which players assemble and manage virtual teams of real Australian rules footballers
- Fantasy football (gridiron), a game in which the participants serve as owners and general managers of virtual gridiron football teams
- Fantasy Football (film), a 2022 American sports film
- Fantasy Football League (TV series), a British sports television series
- "Fantasy Football" (This Life), a 1996 television episode
- The Fantasy Footballers, an American sports podcast

== See also ==
- Fantasy sport, a game where participants assemble imaginary or virtual teams composed of proxies of real players of a professional sport
