= Hawthorn v Essendon (2004 AFL season) =

2004 AFL premiership season

Hawthorn	Essendon
12.8 (80)	24.10 (154)
	1	2	3	4
HAW	2.2 (14)	5.3 (33)	7.6 (48)	12.8 (80)
ESS	6.4 (40)	10.5 (65)	19.8 (122)	24.10 (154)
- Date: 5 June 2004
- Stadium: MCG
- Attendance: 42,682

Broadcast in Australia
- Network: Network Ten

In round 11, 2004, an Australian Football League (AFL) home-and-away match between Hawthorn and Essendon took place at the Melbourne Cricket Ground, which later became known by the unofficial title of the Line in the Sand match.

A number of incidents in the third quarter led to fights breaking out all over the ground, eventually turning into a five-minute melee involving almost all players on the ground. Following the brawl, Essendon kicked fourteen goals to Hawthorn's six to record a 74-point win.

Eighteen players faced charges at the AFL Tribunal from the match on 8 and 9 June 2004, with record suspensions and fines handed out.

== Background ==
Throughout the 1980s and early 1990s, Hawthorn experienced a golden era, making every grand final from 1983 to 1989 and again in 1991, and they were victorious on five occasions.

During this time, they came up against the Bombers on three occasions – 1983, 1984 and 1985. The Hawks comfortably won in 1983, and the Bombers followed up with back-to-back wins in 1984 and 1985. Throughout this decade, both clubs were known to play hard, attacking brands of football, resulting in many biffs, bumps and brawls.

Essendon continued to intimidate opposition clubs in the 1990s and into the early years of the 21st century, resulting in more premiership success in 1993 and 2000, including a dominant record over Hawthorn. Essendon entered the match having won nine of the previous ten meetings between the two clubs, by an average margin of 39 points. They were also heavy favourites to win this match, having a 7–3 win–loss record for the season and were considered a top-four contender, while Hawthorn was bottom of the ladder with only two wins.

== During the match ==
=== Lead-up to the brawl ===
Hawthorn players were allegedly directed at half-time—by club director Dermott Brereton, who played for the Hawks during the 1980s and early 1990s—to "draw a line in the sand" and take a physical stand against the Bombers to make it clear that they would not take the intimidation any longer. Brereton denied the allegation but admitted to advising senior players to "[not] stand for any physical stuff that [Essendon] will try to put over you" and to "fly the flag for yourself".

Within the first two minutes of the third quarter, Mark Williams kicked Hawthorn's sixth goal of the match to cut Essendon's lead to 26 points.

Following the centre bounce, several players were on the ground vigorously attempting to gain possession of the ball and clear it for their team. Mark Johnson of Essendon attempted to join in at a stoppage but was quickly removed by a number of Hawthorn players. This led to some wrestling and jumper punches amongst the players, with approximately 16 players in the centre square at the time. Channel Ten commentators said that the spirit was "bubbling over a little".

A free kick was awarded to Hawthorn, and the ball was quickly kicked forward. The Hawks were unable to take a mark inside their forward 50, and the ball fell into Mark Bolton's hands, who was able to clear for the Bombers. He kicked the ball along the southern side of the ground with the aim of reaching Jason Winderlich, who, while attempting to mark close to the ground, copped a very hard knock from Hawthorn's Chance Bateman, possibly a knee or hip connecting with his head. A free kick was awarded to Winderlich, who was forced from the ground under the blood rule.

=== The brawl ===
A number of brawls broke out on the Great Southern Stand side of the centre square, with many players getting involved. Players tackled each other to the ground, threw fist- and jumper-punches and wrestled with each other. Hawthorn's Richie Vandenberg and Lance Picioane were particularly active, and Essendon's Adam McPhee, Mark Johnson and Justin Murphy were keen to respond. As Winderlich continued off the ground in the arms of trainers, he was struck by Campbell Brown of Hawthorn, an act which was described by Essendon forward Matthew Lloyd after the match as "one of the most disgusting things I've seen on a football field". Channel Ten commentators described it as "the 1980s revisited", "unbelievable" and stated: "We haven't seen these sort of scenes for a long time in AFL football". Trainers, runners and some senior players were seen restraining and dragging their club's players away from opposition players, while McPhee had to be restrained and given marching orders from Bruce Connor, Essendon's head physiotherapist, to receive attention to a bloodied eye.

=== After the brawl ===
A few follow-up scuffles occurred, but Essendon regained composure and hit back hard on the scoreboard, kicking nine of the next ten goals to extend the three-quarter time lead to 74 points. A 10-goal final quarter, five to each team, left the margin as it was at three-quarter-time, with the Bombers recording a 74-point win.

== Tribunal ==
The fallout from the match was unprecedented, with a record 18 players reported on a record 26 charges. Some players were reported by umpires on the field, while the rest were cited on video evidence by video reports officer Ian Robinson and after an investigation conducted by the AFL's investigations officer Rick Lewis.

=== Charges ===
==== Hawthorn ====
Player	Charge
John Barker	Striking Adam McPhee, Essendon, in the third quarter.
John Barker	Engaging in a melee during the third quarter.
Simon Beaumont	Striking Justin Murphy during the third quarter (video evidence).
Simon Beaumont	Misconduct in that on two occasions he thrust his head towards the face of Justin Murphy, Essendon, during the third quarter.
Simon Beaumont	Engaging in a melee during the third quarter.
Campbell Brown	Wrestling with Dean Rioli, Essendon, during the third quarter.
Campbell Brown	Striking Jason Winderlich, Essendon, in the third quarter.
Campbell Brown	Engaging in a melee during the third quarter.
Richard Vandenberg	Striking Adam McPhee, Essendon, during the third quarter.
Richard Vandenberg	Misconduct in that he made unnecessary and unreasonable contact with his leg to Adam McPhee, Essendon, during the third quarter.
Richard Vandenberg	Engaging in a melee during the third quarter.
Lance Picioane	Striking Adam McPhee, Essendon, during the third quarter.
Lance Picioane	Engaging in a melee during the third quarter.
Chance Bateman	Engaging in a melee during the third quarter.
Peter Everitt	Engaging in a melee during the third quarter.
Nick Holland	Engaging in a melee during the third quarter.
Mark Williams	Engaging in a melee during the third quarter.

==== Essendon ====
Player	Charge
Justin Murphy	Alleged misconduct in that he headbutted Simon Beaumont during the third quarter (video evidence).
Justin Murphy	Engaging in a melee during the third quarter.
Jason Johnson	Engaging in a melee during the third quarter.
Mark Johnson	Engaging in a melee during the third quarter.
Adam McPhee	Engaging in a melee during the third quarter.
Mark McVeigh	Engaging in a melee during the third quarter.
Damien Peverill	Engaging in a melee during the third quarter.
Dean Rioli	Engaging in a melee during the third quarter.
Dean Solomon	Engaging in a melee during the third quarter.
Andrew Welsh	Engaging in a melee during the third quarter.

=== Outcomes ===
The tribunal decisions were severe, with five players suspended for a combined total of 16 matches and players involved in the melee fined a combined total of $70,700. The fines total distributed was the most from a single match in VFL/AFL history, and was described by tribunal chairman Brian Collis QC as bringing "football into disrepute".

==== Hawthorn ====
Richard Vandenberg, Lance Picioane, Campbell Brown and Simon Beaumont were suspended for a combined total of 15 matches, and melee fines totalled $36,700:

Player	Charge	Outcome
Richard Vandenberg	Striking Adam McPhee	Suspended for 3 matches
Richard Vandenberg	Kneeing Adam McPhee	Suspended for 3 matches
Richard Vandenberg	Melee	Fined $4,000
Lance Picioane	Striking Adam McPhee	Suspended for 4 matches
Lance Picioane	Melee	Fined $4,000
Campbell Brown	Striking Jason Winderlich	Suspended for 4 matches
Campbell Brown	Melee	Fined $4,000
Campbell Brown	Wrestling with Dean Rioli	Fined $1,200
John Barker	Striking Adam McPhee	Cleared
John Barker	Melee	Fined $4,500
Simon Beaumont	Striking Justin Murphy	Cleared
Simon Beaumont	Misconduct against Justin Murphy	Suspended for 1 match
Simon Beaumont	Melee	Withdrawn
Chance Bateman	Melee	Fined $5,000
Peter Everitt	Melee	Fined $5,000
Nick Holland	Melee	Fined $5,000
Mark Williams	Melee	Fined $4,000

==== Essendon ====
Justin Murphy was suspended for 1 match, and melee fines totalled $34,000:

Player	Charge	Outcome
Justin Murphy	Head-butting Simon Beaumont	Suspended for 1 match
Justin Murphy	Melee	Withdrawn
Mark Johnson	Melee	Fined $6,500
Adam McPhee	Melee	Fined $4,500
Dean Solomon	Melee	Fined $4,500
Mark McVeigh	Melee	Fined $4,000
Dean Rioli	Melee	Fined $4,000
Damien Peverill	Melee	Fined $3,500
Jason Johnson	Melee	Fined $3,500
Andrew Welsh	Melee	Fined $3,500

== Match result ==
Round 11, 2004
Saturday, 5 June 2:10 pm	Hawthorn	def. by	Essendon	MCG (crowd: 42,682)
2.2 (14); 5.3 (33); 7.6 (48); 12.8 (80)	Q1; Q2; Q3; Final	6.4 (40); 10.5 (65); 19.8 (122); 24.10 (154)	Umpires: Schmitt, Jeffery, Goldspink; Television broadcast: Network Ten
Bateman 2, Everitt 2, Thompson 2, Williams 2, Beaumont, Hodge, Smith, Vandenberg	Goals	Lloyd 7, Lucas 3, Murphy 2, M. Johnson 2, Rioli 2, Allan, Alvey, Bolton, Henneman, J. Johnson, Misiti, Peverill, Solomon
Smith, Hodge, Dixon	Best	Lucas, Lloyd, Solomon, Allan, J. Johnson, McPhee
See Tribunal	Reports	See Tribunal

Brownlow Medal votes
3 S. Lucas; 2 D. Rioli; 1 M. Lloyd

== Aftermath ==
Both teams struggled for the remainder of the season. Hawthorn did not win another match until round 19, and finished the season with four wins, narrowly avoiding the wooden spoon to Richmond on percentage. Essendon, meanwhile, won just four more matches for the regular season to qualify for the finals in eighth place. They defeated fifth-placed Melbourne by five points in the first elimination final, but then lost to Geelong by ten points the following week.

In the years following this match, the clubs' fortunes reversed sharply. Essendon dropped to 13th the following season, missing out on the finals for the first time since 1997, and would not make another finals series until 2009, doing so after they defeated Hawthorn by 17 points in the final round of the 2009 season. It still, however, managed a two-point win over the Hawks early in the 2005 season, courtesy of a controversial goal to Dean Solomon; it marked the Bombers' tenth consecutive victory over the Hawks dating back to 1998. Following that, Essendon would not beat Hawthorn again until round 7, 2009, but would beat the Hawks three consecutive times within twelve months, including a resounding 43-point victory in round 6, 2010, in which the Hawks copped criticism for a performance described as "embarrassing".

Hawthorn, meanwhile, gradually started to rise up the ladder under new coach Alastair Clarkson, reaching the semi-finals in 2007 and winning the premiership the following year; it subsequently won three more premierships in succession between 2013 and 2015.

The clubs have maintained a strong rivalry, but only one match has turned particularly violent since: in the final round of the 2009 season, with the two sides battling for eighth place on the ladder, a brawl was sparked by a head-high shirtfront from Essendon captain Matthew Lloyd on Hawthorn midfielder Brad Sewell at the start of the third quarter, which was to be the turning point in the match. Lloyd had been subject to a half-time spray from coach Matthew Knights after the Bombers and Lloyd individually had played poorly in the first half, and he had wanted to make a statement against the reigning premiers. Essendon won the match by 17 points after trailing by 22 points at the time of the Lloyd–Sewell incident. Naturally, Campbell Brown opined that Lloyd was one of the biggest snipers in the sport, to counter what Lloyd had said after the 2004 game.

== See also ==
- List of sporting scandals
- Battle of Brookvale
