= John Lloyd (Australian footballer) =

Australian rules footballer (1945–2022)

Personal information
- Born: 30 April 1945; Victoria, Australia
- Died: 1 June 2022 (aged 77); Australia
- Original team: Yarrawonga
- Height: 180 cm (5 ft 11 in)
- Weight: 83 kg (183 lb)

Playing career^{1}
| Years | Club | Games (Goals) |
| 1965–1967 | Carlton | 29 (0) |
- ^{1} Playing statistics correct to the end of 1967.

John Lloyd (30 April 1945 – 1 June 2022) was an Australian rules footballer who played with Carlton in the Victorian Football League (VFL).

== Career ==
Lloyd was recruited to Carlton from Yarrawonga in the Ovens & Murray Football League. He made his debut in round four of the 1965 VFL season but played just two more games that year, in rounds 17 and 18. In 1966 he played every game from round two to 11, before a broken arm ended his season. He made 16 appearances for Carlton in 1967, including their semi-final loss to Richmond.

He got a clearance to Eaglehawk in 1968 and spent two years in the Bendigo Football League club. In 1970 he began playing for Werribee and won their best and fairest award the following year. He spent the 1972 season with Port Melbourne, then joined Footscray District Football League club Braybrook as coach and steered them to three successive premierships (1973, 1974, 1975).

== Family ==
Lloyd was the father of former Essendon full-forward Matthew Lloyd, who kicked 926 league goals. His two other sons are also involved in football, with Brad Lloyd playing 11 games for Hawthorn and Simon Lloyd playing at lower levels for Carlton and Williamstown and is currently the general manager of football at Geelong, after previously working at Fremantle, Collingwood and Hawthorn.
