= Simon Beaumont =

Australian rules footballer

Personal information
- Born: 13 December 1975 (age 50)
- Original team: Melbourne Grammar / Central U18
- Debut: Round 10, 1995, Carlton vs. Hawthorn, at Princes Park
- Height: 189 cm (6 ft 2 in)
- Weight: 88 kg (194 lb)

Playing career^{1}
Years	Club	Games (Goals)
1995–2003	Carlton	152 (89)
2004–2005	Hawthorn	27 (12)
Total		179 (101)
- ^{1} Playing statistics correct to the end of 2005.

Simon Beaumont (born 13 December 1975) is a former Australian rules footballer who played for Carlton and Hawthorn in the Australian Football League (AFL).

Carlton secured the services of Beaumont with the 18th pick in the 1993 AFL draft. A left-footer, Beaumont was used mainly as a half-back flanker and later key defender but could also play forward, which was demonstrated in a game for Carlton against Collingwood at the Melbourne Cricket Ground in Round 17, 1999, when he kicked eight goals, all of them in the first half. He is also a member of an exclusive group of players who kicked a goal with their first kick in the AFL, which he managed against Hawthorn in 1995.

Beaumont played 133 consecutive games for the club between Round 9, 1998, and Round 22, 2003. He became the first Carlton player to play 100 games in the #29 guernsey, thereby becoming the first name on the #29 locker in the Carlton changerooms (he was later surpassed by Heath Scotland).

Beaumont was traded to Hawthorn at the end of the 2003 season. He increased his streak of consecutive games played to 144 before being suspended for striking former Carlton teammate Justin Murphy in the infamous "Line in the Sand Game". Beaumont spent two years at Hawthorn, playing 27 games in all, before retiring.
