= 2004 AFL season =

108th season of the Australian Football League (AFL)

2004 AFL premiership season

Overview
- Date: 26 March – 25 September 2004
- Teams: 16
- Premiers: Port Adelaide; 1st premiership
- Runners-up: Brisbane Lions; 1st runners-up result
- Minor premiers: Port Adelaide; 3rd minor premiership
- Wizard Home Loans Cup: St Kilda; 2nd pre-season cup win
- Brownlow Medallist: Chris Judd (West Coast); 30 votes
- Coleman Medallist: Fraser Gehrig; 90 goals

Attendance
- Matches played: 185
- Total attendance: 6,368,297 (34,423 per match)
- Highest (H&A): 60,898 (round 22, Collingwood v Carlton)
- Highest (finals): 77,671 (Grand Final, Port Adelaide v Brisbane Lions)

The 2004 AFL season was the 108th season of the Australian Football League (AFL), the highest-level senior Australian rules football competition in Australia, which was known as the Victorian Football League until 1989. The season featured sixteen clubs, ran from 26 March until 25 September, and comprised a 22-game home-and-away season followed by a finals series featuring the top eight clubs.

The premiership was won by the Port Adelaide Football Club for the first time, after it defeated the Brisbane Lions by 40 points in the 2004 AFL Grand Final.

== AFL Draft ==
See 2004 AFL draft.

== Wizard Home Loans Cup ==
The Wizard Home Loans Cup final saw St Kilda defeat Geelong 1.14.5 (98) to 1.10.7 (76) in front of a crowd of 50,533.

== Premiership season ==
=== Round 1 ===
	Round 1 (season launch)
Friday, 26 March (7:45 pm)	Richmond 14.13 (97)	def.	Collingwood 8.9 (57)	MCG (crowd: 55,622)
Saturday, 27 March (2:10 pm)	Hawthorn 17.17 (119)	def.	Melbourne 10.10 (70)	MCG (crowd: 38,351)
Saturday, 27 March (2:15 pm)	Fremantle 15.17 (107)	def.	Carlton 8.12 (60)	Subiaco Oval (crowd: 34,177)
Saturday, 27 March (7:10 pm)	St Kilda 19.8 (122)	def.	Geelong 9.7 (61)	Telstra Dome (crowd: 35,042)
Saturday, 27 March (7:10 pm)	Brisbane Lions 11.14 (80)	def.	Sydney 11.12 (78)	The Gabba (crowd: 34,028)
Sunday, 28 March (12:40 pm)	Port Adelaide 23.20 (158)	def.	Essendon 8.14 (62)	AAMI Stadium (crowd: 28,413)
Sunday, 28 March (2:10 pm)	Kangaroos 23.11 (149)	def.	Adelaide 10.14 (74)	MCG (crowd: 19,231)
Sunday, 28 March (2:10 pm)	Western Bulldogs 20.17 (137)	def. by	West Coast 22.12 (144)	Telstra Dome (crowd: 18,841)

=== Round 2 ===
	Round 2
Friday, 2 April (7:45 pm)	Melbourne 20.15 (135)	def.	Richmond 12.4 (76)	MCG (crowd: 33,406)
Saturday, 3 April (2:10 pm)	Collingwood 15.16 (106)	def.	Western Bulldogs 13.19 (97)	MCG (crowd: 40,044)
Saturday, 3 April (2:10 pm)	Adelaide 11.17 (83)	def. by	Brisbane Lions 15.14 (104)	AAMI Stadium (crowd: 41,095)
Saturday, 3 April (7:10 pm)	Essendon 8.12 (60)	def. by	St Kilda 13.16 (94)	Telstra Dome (crowd: 44,876)
Saturday, 3 April (5:40 pm)	West Coast 17.13 (115)	def. by	Port Adelaide 18.10 (118)	Subiaco Oval (crowd: 39,760)
Sunday, 4 April (1:10 pm)	Sydney 15.12 (102)	def.	Fremantle 10.11 (71)	SCG (crowd: 21,366)
Sunday, 4 April (2:10 pm)	Carlton 16.8 (104)	def.	Geelong 6.14 (50)	Optus Oval (crowd: 25,037)
Sunday, 4 April (2:10 pm)	Hawthorn 11.8 (74)	def. by	Kangaroos 15.13 (103)	MCG (crowd: 35,305)

=== Round 3 ===
	Round 3 (Easter)
Thursday, 8 April (7:40 pm)	Brisbane Lions 21.11 (137)	def.	Collingwood 12.5 (77)	The Gabba (crowd: 36,467)
Saturday, 10 April (2:10 pm)	Kangaroos 17.9 (111)	def.	Carlton 16.10 (106)	MCG (crowd: 36,273)
Saturday, 10 April (7:10 pm)	Essendon 22.5 (137)	def.	West Coast 20.11 (131)	Telstra Dome (crowd: 33,195)
Saturday, 10 April (7:10 pm)	Sydney 10.13 (73)	def.	Geelong 10.7 (67)	SCG (crowd: 25,451)
Sunday, 11 April (12:40 pm)	Port Adelaide 26.15 (171)	def.	Hawthorn 13.12 (90)	AAMI Stadium (crowd: 27,421)
Sunday, 11 April (2:10 pm)	Western Bulldogs 12.15 (87)	def. by	Melbourne 12.25 (97)	MCG (crowd: 27,767)
Sunday, 11 April (2:10 pm)	Fremantle 10.13 (73)	def.	Adelaide 8.16 (64)	Subiaco Oval (crowd: 32,575)
Monday, 12 April (2:10 pm)	St Kilda 16.18 (114)	def.	Richmond 10.9 (69)	Telstra Dome (crowd: 43,468)

=== Round 4 ===
	Round 4
Friday, 16 April (7:40 pm)	Carlton 12.8 (80)	def. by	Essendon 17.15 (117)	MCG (crowd: 60,864)
Saturday, 17 April (2:10 pm)	Melbourne 18.16 (124)	def.	Port Adelaide 10.11 (71)	MCG (crowd: 20,093)
Saturday, 17 April (2:10 pm)	West Coast 12.7 (79)	def.	Brisbane Lions 10.16 (76)	Subiaco Oval (crowd: 39,666)
Saturday, 17 April (7:10 pm)	Geelong 19.13 (127)	def.	Richmond 11.12 (78)	Telstra Dome (crowd: 31,575)
Saturday, 17 April (7:10 pm)	Adelaide 15.8 (98)	def. by	St Kilda 18.5 (113)	AAMI Stadium (crowd: 42,219)
Sunday, 18 April (1:10 pm)	Kangaroos 10.10 (70)	def. by	Sydney 18.13 (121)	Manuka Oval (crowd: 14,891)
Sunday, 18 April (2:10 pm)	Collingwood 7.12 (54)	def. by	Fremantle 12.16 (88)	Telstra Dome (crowd: 34,416)
Sunday, 18 April (2:10 pm)	Hawthorn 14.13 (97)	def. by	Western Bulldogs 16.13 (109)	MCG (crowd: 24,959)

=== Round 5 ===
	Round 5 (ANZAC Day)
Friday, 23 April (7:40 pm)	Richmond 9.5 (59)	def. by	Adelaide 21.8 (134)	Telstra Dome (crowd: 25,267)
Saturday, 24 April (2:10 pm)	Carlton 14.8 (92)	def.	West Coast 6.7 (43)	Optus Oval (crowd: 18,018)
Saturday, 24 April (2:10 pm)	St Kilda 20.10 (130)	def.	Kangaroos 8.17 (65)	Telstra Dome (crowd: 38,896)
Saturday, 24 April (7:10 pm)	Brisbane Lions 14.26 (110)	def.	Hawthorn 9.8 (62)	The Gabba (crowd: 34,526)
Saturday, 24 April (7:20 pm)	Sydney 15.9 (99)	def. by	Melbourne 17.9 (111)	Telstra Stadium (crowd: 33,127)
Sunday, 25 April (1:15 pm)	Collingwood 11.13 (79)	def. by	Essendon 17.10 (112)	MCG (crowd: 57,294)
Sunday, 25 April (2:45 pm)	Port Adelaide 17.17 (119)	def.	Western Bulldogs 7.22 (64)	AAMI Stadium (crowd: 26,839)
Sunday, 25 April (2:15 pm)	Fremantle 18.9 (117)	def.	Geelong 14.7 (91)	Subiaco Oval (crowd: 35,021)

=== Round 6 ===
	Round 6
Friday, 30 April (7:40 pm)	Richmond 12.12 (84)	def.	Hawthorn 13.5 (83)	Telstra Dome (crowd: 37,947)
Saturday, 1 May (2:10 pm)	Essendon 16.12 (108)	def.	Sydney 15.8 (98)	MCG (crowd: 38,946)
Saturday, 1 May (2:10 pm)	Kangaroos 18.11 (119)	def. by	Western Bulldogs 19.6 (120)	Manuka Oval (crowd: 7,222)
Saturday, 1 May (7:10 pm)	St Kilda 13.14 (92)	def.	Brisbane Lions 14.7 (91)	Telstra Dome (crowd: 53,539)
Saturday, 1 May (5:40 pm)	West Coast 11.7 (73)	def. by	Fremantle 12.11 (83)	Subiaco Oval (crowd: 42,135)
Sunday, 2 May (1:10 pm)	Geelong 15.11 (101)	def.	Adelaide 8.10 (58)	Skilled Stadium (crowd: 18,224)
Sunday, 2 May (2:10 pm)	Melbourne 25.10 (160)	def.	Carlton 8.7 (55)	MCG (crowd: 38,799)
Sunday, 2 May (2:40 pm)	Port Adelaide 14.17 (101)	def.	Collingwood 12.12 (84)	AAMI Stadium (crowd: 31,174)
Three games in this round were decided by one point.

=== Round 7 ===
	Round 7 (Mother's Day)
Friday, 7 May (7:40 pm)	Western Bulldogs 14.11 (95)	def. by	Essendon 18.13 (121)	Telstra Dome (crowd: 45,119)
Saturday, 8 May (2:10 pm)	Carlton 13.11 (89)	def.	Collingwood 11.14 (80)	MCG (crowd: 56,617)
Saturday, 8 May (2:10 pm)	Fremantle 11.6 (72)	def. by	St Kilda 14.11 (95)	Subiaco Oval (crowd: 39,931)
Saturday, 8 May (7:10 pm)	Kangaroos 11.10 (76)	def. by	Brisbane Lions 18.12 (120)	Telstra Dome (crowd: 27,511)
Saturday, 8 May (7:10 pm)	Port Adelaide 13.9 (87)	def. by	Adelaide 17.17 (119)	AAMI Stadium (crowd: 44,733)
Sunday, 9 May (1:10 pm)	Sydney 8.6 (54)	def. by	Richmond 10.7 (67)	SCG (crowd: 23,014)
Sunday, 9 May (2:10 pm)	Melbourne 18.14 (122)	def.	West Coast 11.7 (73)	MCG (crowd: 21,145)
Sunday, 9 May (5:10 pm)	Hawthorn 8.4 (52)	def. by	Geelong 15.18 (108)	Telstra Dome (crowd: 28,612)

=== Round 8 ===
	Round 8
Friday, 14 May (7:10 pm)	Adelaide 12.12 (84)	def. by	Essendon 20.15 (135)	AAMI Stadium (crowd: 46,309)
Saturday, 15 May (2:10 pm)	Richmond 15.15 (105)	def.	Western Bulldogs 10.22 (82)	MCG (crowd: 33,960)
Saturday, 15 May (2:10 pm)	West Coast 18.16 (124)	def.	Sydney 15.7 (97)	Subiaco Oval (crowd: 38,870)
Saturday, 15 May (7:10 pm)	St Kilda 21.12 (138)	def.	Collingwood 13.13 (91)	Telstra Dome (crowd: 47,898)
Saturday, 15 May (7:10 pm)	Brisbane Lions 21.14 (140)	def.	Carlton 16.6 (102)	The Gabba (crowd: 34,368)
Sunday, 16 May (1:10 pm)	Hawthorn 10.10 (70)	def.	Fremantle 8.13 (61)	Aurora Stadium (crowd: 14,554)
Sunday, 16 May (2:10 pm)	Geelong 15.11 (101)	def.	Melbourne 12.15 (87)	Skilled Stadium (crowd: 21,157)
Sunday, 16 May (2:10 pm)	Kangaroos 21.14 (140)	def.	Port Adelaide 7.6 (48)	Telstra Dome (crowd: 16,910)

=== Round 9 ===
	Round 9
Friday, 21 May (7:40 pm)	Collingwood 9.14 (68)	def.	Adelaide 9.11 (65)	Telstra Dome (crowd: 37,881)
Saturday, 22 May (2:10 pm)	Melbourne 13.18 (96)	def.	Kangaroos 11.12 (78)	MCG (crowd: 31,291)
Saturday, 22 May (2:10 pm)	Fremantle 20.17 (137)	def.	Brisbane Lions 11.12 (78)	Subiaco Oval (crowd: 32,575)
Saturday, 22 May (7:10 pm)	Geelong 18.12 (120)	def.	Essendon 14.13 (97)	Telstra Dome (crowd: 51,400)
Saturday, 22 May (7:10 pm)	Port Adelaide 19.14 (128)	def.	Richmond 7.8 (50)	AAMI Stadium (crowd: 25,761)
Sunday, 23 May (1:10 pm)	Sydney 11.14 (80)	def.	Hawthorn 12.7 (79)	SCG (crowd: 25,127)
Sunday, 23 May (2:10 pm)	Carlton 12.7 (79)	def. by	Western Bulldogs 16.8 (104)	Optus Oval (crowd: 26,041)
Sunday, 23 May (2:10 pm)	St Kilda 26.13 (169)	def.	West Coast 9.14 (68)	Telstra Dome (crowd: 30,478)
St Kilda's 101-point win against West Coast was their largest against the Eagles.

=== Round 10 ===
	Round 10
Friday, 28 May (7:40 pm)	Essendon 17.13 (115)	def.	Fremantle 12.13 (85)	Telstra Dome (crowd: 38,411)
Saturday, 29 May (2:10 pm)	Hawthorn 6.11 (47)	def. by	Adelaide 20.13 (133)	MCG (crowd: 22,942)
Saturday, 29 May (2:10 pm)	West Coast 14.16 (100)	def.	Richmond 9.9 (63)	Subiaco Oval (crowd: 38,517)
Saturday, 29 May (7:10 pm)	Kangaroos 9.11 (65)	def. by	Collingwood 13.14 (92)	Telstra Dome (crowd: 44,833)
Saturday, 29 May (7:10 pm)	Western Bulldogs 10.7 (67)	def. by	Sydney 12.21 (93)	SCG (crowd: 23,479)
Sunday, 30 May (1:10 pm)	Melbourne 12.11 (83)	def. by	Brisbane Lions 18.15 (123)	The Gabba (crowd: 32,902)
Sunday, 30 May (2:10 pm)	Carlton 13.10 (88)	def. by	St Kilda 31.10 (196)	Telstra Dome (crowd: 37,136)
Sunday, 30 May (2:10 pm)	Port Adelaide 18.8 (116)	def.	Geelong 17.10 (112)	AAMI Stadium (crowd: 29,177)

=== Round 11 ===
	Round 11
Friday, 4 June (7:40 pm)	Collingwood 14.9 (93)	def.	West Coast 11.9 (75)	Telstra Dome (crowd: 44,401)
Saturday, 5 June (2:10 pm)	Hawthorn 12.8 (80)	def. by	Essendon 24.10 (154)	MCG (crowd: 42,682)
Saturday, 5 June (2:10 pm)	Adelaide 12.15 (87)	def. by	Carlton 14.7 (91)	AAMI Stadium (crowd: 41,617)
Saturday, 5 June (7:10 pm)	Kangaroos 24.10 (154)	def.	Richmond 12.8 (80)	Telstra Dome (crowd: 31,700)
Saturday, 5 June (7:10 pm)	Brisbane Lions 18.15 (123)	def.	Port Adelaide 12.14 (86)	The Gabba (crowd: 34,241)
Sunday, 6 June (1:10 pm)	Sydney 17.10 (112)	def.	St Kilda 11.10 (76)	SCG (crowd: 36,039)
Sunday, 6 June (2:10 pm)	Western Bulldogs 10.7 (67)	def. by	Geelong 17.11 (113)	Telstra Dome (crowd: 31,811)
Sunday, 6 June (2:10 pm)	Fremantle 9.8 (62)	def. by	Melbourne 13.15 (93)	Subiaco Oval (crowd: 33,125)
A five-minute brawl broke out between rivals Hawthorn and Essendon in the round 11 match, after which one Bomber (Justin Murphy) and four Hawks players received suspensions totalling 16 matches, and a combined total of $70,700 of fines were handed out. 27 charges were brought before the AFL Tribunal, the most ever from a single game. The game is widely known as the "Line in the Sand" match as the brawls were sparked in the third quarter after Hawthorn players were urged at a half-time address by club legend Dermott Brereton to metaphorically draw such a line; Brereton thought the young Hawks were being physically intimidated by the more experienced Bombers.; Two games on the same day consisted of the 24.10 (154) to 12.8 (80) scoreline – the aforementioned Hawthorn vs. Essendon match as well as the Kangaroos vs. Richmond match that was played in the evening.; The Sydney Swans handed St Kilda their first defeat of the season, winning by 36 points in a match best known for Leo Barry's shut-down effort on Fraser Gehrig, who statistically played his worst match for the season registering only two disposals.

=== Round 12 ===
	Round 12 (Queen's Birthday)
Friday, 11 June (7:40 pm)	Carlton 15.10 (100)	def.	Hawthorn 14.4 (88)	Telstra Dome (crowd: 47,302)
Saturday, 12 June (2:10 pm)	Western Bulldogs 15.13 (103)	def.	St Kilda 11.14 (80)	MCG (crowd: 28,306)
Saturday, 12 June (7:10 pm)	Essendon 14.12 (96)	def. by	Brisbane Lions 25.12 (162)	Telstra Dome (crowd: 50,003)
Saturday, 12 June (5:40 pm)	West Coast 15.18 (108)	def.	Adelaide 11.10 (76)	Subiaco Oval (crowd: 37,580)
Sunday, 13 June (12:40 pm)	Port Adelaide 20.12 (132)	def.	Sydney 8.12 (60)	AAMI Stadium (crowd: 28,032)
Sunday, 13 June (2:10 pm)	Geelong 14.10 (94)	def.	Kangaroos 12.12 (84)	Skilled Stadium (crowd: 21,612)
Sunday, 13 June (2:10 pm)	Richmond 10.11 (71)	def. by	Fremantle 12.9 (81)	MCG (crowd: 18,666)
Monday, 14 June (2:10 pm)	Melbourne 12.10 (82)	def.	Collingwood 11.7 (73)	MCG (crowd: 56,988)

=== Round 13 ===
	Round 13 (Split Round)
Friday, 18 June (7:40 pm)	St Kilda 19.13 (127)	def.	Hawthorn 9.7 (61)	Telstra Dome (crowd: 36,925)
Saturday, 19 June (2:10 pm)	Geelong 13.14 (92)	def.	Brisbane Lions 9.11 (65)	Skilled Stadium (crowd: 17,648)
Saturday, 19 June (7:10 pm)	Richmond 14.9 (93)	def. by	Carlton 18.16 (124)	Telstra Dome (crowd: 46,618)
Saturday, 19 June (5:40 pm)	Fremantle 16.6 (102)	def. by	Port Adelaide 17.10 (112)	Subiaco Oval (crowd: 36,507)
Sunday, 20 June (1:10 pm)	Kangaroos 16.12 (108)	def.	West Coast 11.9 (75)	Manuka Oval (crowd: 8,542)
Sunday, 20 June (2:10 pm)	Essendon 10.9 (69)	def. by	Melbourne 13.17 (95)	MCG (crowd: 47,314)
Sunday, 20 June (2:10 pm)	Adelaide 20.13 (133)	def.	Western Bulldogs 15.11 (101)	AAMI Stadium (crowd: 36,774)
Saturday, 26 June (7:10 pm)	Sydney 13.7 (85)	def.	Collingwood 11.13 (79)	Telstra Stadium (crowd: 50,091)
Geelong's win over the Brisbane Lions was their first ever over the merger club and the first over a Brisbane side since round 14, 1995.; Adelaide coach Gary Ayres resigned as coach after the win over the Western Bulldogs, with Neil Craig taking over as caretaker for the remainder of the season. Craig would become the head coach from next year.

=== Round 14 ===
	Round 14
Friday, 2 July (7:40 pm)	Essendon 12.7 (79)	def. by	Kangaroos 14.16 (100)	Telstra Dome (crowd: 49,419)
Saturday, 3 July (2:10 pm)	Carlton 12.12 (84)	def. by	Sydney 15.5 (95)	Optus Oval (crowd: 26,172)
Saturday, 3 July (2:10 pm)	Collingwood 20.20 (140)	def.	Hawthorn 11.9 (75)	MCG (crowd: 44,329)
Saturday, 3 July (7:10 pm)	Brisbane Lions 17.12 (114)	def.	Richmond 14.12 (96)	The Gabba (crowd: 32,744)
Saturday, 3 July (5:40 pm)	West Coast 7.9 (51)	def.	Geelong 7.7 (49)	Subiaco Oval (crowd: 36,668)
Sunday, 4 July (1:10 pm)	St Kilda 7.5 (47)	def. by	Port Adelaide 14.9 (93)	Aurora Stadium (crowd: 19,223)
Sunday, 4 July (2:10 pm)	Western Bulldogs 10.16 (76)	def. by	Fremantle 18.9 (117)	Telstra Dome (crowd: 18,734)
Sunday, 4 July (2:10 pm)	Adelaide 22.13 (145)	def.	Melbourne 10.13 (73)	AAMI Stadium (crowd: 39,288)

=== Round 15 ===
	Round 15
Friday, 9 July (7:40 pm)	Collingwood 9.11 (65)	def. by	Geelong 12.22 (94)	Telstra Dome (crowd: 50,627)
Saturday, 10 July (1:10 pm)	Hawthorn 12.10 (82)	def. by	West Coast 12.14 (86)	Aurora Stadium (crowd: 15,581)
Saturday, 10 July (2:10 pm)	Richmond 11.11 (77)	def. by	Essendon 24.11 (155)	MCG (crowd: 48,286)
Saturday, 10 July (5:10 pm)	Fremantle 12.7 (79)	def. by	Kangaroos 14.12 (96)	Subiaco Oval (crowd: 37,077)
Saturday, 10 July (7:10 pm)	Sydney 8.10 (58)	def.	Adelaide 6.9 (45)	SCG (crowd: 28,493)
Sunday, 11 July (1:10 pm)	Brisbane Lions 20.16 (136)	def.	Western Bulldogs 10.8 (68)	The Gabba (crowd: 29,295)
Sunday, 11 July (2:10 pm)	Melbourne 23.8 (146)	def.	St Kilda 13.11 (89)	MCG (crowd: 54,409)
Sunday, 11 July (2:10 pm)	Port Adelaide 18.15 (123)	def.	Carlton 5.10 (40)	AAMI Stadium (crowd: 30,109)

=== Round 16 ===
	Round 16
Friday, 16 July (6:40 pm)	West Coast 18.9 (117)	def.	Essendon 10.13 (73)	Subiaco Oval (crowd: 40,674)
Saturday, 17 July (2:10 pm)	Carlton 9.16 (70)	def.	Kangaroos 9.8 (62)	Optus Oval (crowd: 20,732)
Saturday, 17 July (2:10 pm)	Richmond 9.7 (61)	def. by	St Kilda 16.9 (105)	Telstra Dome (crowd: 34,631)
Saturday, 17 July (7:10 pm)	Collingwood 11.7 (73)	def. by	Brisbane Lions 16.13 (109)	MCG (crowd: 34,236)
Saturday, 17 July (7:10 pm)	Adelaide 12.8 (80)	def. by	Fremantle 14.8 (92)	AAMI Stadium (crowd: 34,855)
Sunday, 18 July (1:10 pm)	Geelong 11.11 (77)	def.	Sydney 9.8 (62)	Skilled Stadium (crowd: 20,515)
Sunday, 18 July (2:10 pm)	Hawthorn 7.11 (53)	def. by	Port Adelaide 15.15 (105)	MCG (crowd: 11,682)
Sunday, 18 July (2:10 pm)	Melbourne 12.21 (93)	def.	Western Bulldogs 7.13 (55)	Telstra Dome (crowd: 25,107)

=== Round 17 ===
	Round 17
Friday, 23 July (7:40 pm)	St Kilda 20.7 (127)	def.	Essendon 14.8 (92)	Telstra Dome (crowd: 50,392)
Saturday, 24 July (2:10 pm)	Kangaroos 22.11 (143)	def.	Hawthorn 8.15 (63)	MCG (crowd: 20,018)
Saturday, 24 July (2:10 pm)	Fremantle 18.10 (118)	def.	Sydney 14.7 (91)	Subiaco Oval (crowd: 35,037)
Saturday, 24 July (7:10 pm)	Western Bulldogs 8.18 (66)	def. by	Collingwood 17.13 (115)	Telstra Dome (crowd: 32,675)
Saturday, 24 July (7:10 pm)	Brisbane Lions 29.15 (189)	def.	Adelaide 6.12 (48)	The Gabba (crowd: 33,443)
Sunday, 25 July (12:40 pm)	Port Adelaide 16.6 (102)	def.	West Coast 9.22 (76)	AAMI Stadium (crowd: 26,286)
Sunday, 25 July (2:10 pm)	Geelong 18.23 (131)	def.	Carlton 11.8 (74)	Telstra Dome (crowd: 43,210)
Sunday, 25 July (2:10 pm)	Richmond 10.10 (70)	def. by	Melbourne 19.12 (126)	MCG (crowd: 25,211)
The Brisbane Lions' 141-point win over Adelaide was their biggest ever win, and Adelaide's biggest ever defeat.; Hawthorn coach Peter Schwab announced his intention of leaving the role at the end of the season in the week leading up to their game verses Kangaroos. The Roos 80-point win over the Hawks fast-tracked Schwab’s departure to the days following with assistant Donald McDonald appointed as interim coach for the remainder of the year.

=== Round 18 ===
	Round 18 (Heritage Round)
Friday, 30 July (8:10 pm)	Adelaide 5.19 (49)	def.	Kangaroos 5.12 (42)	AAMI Stadium (crowd: 37,562)
Saturday, 31 July (2:10 pm)	Collingwood 15.13 (103)	def.	Richmond 14.14 (98)	MCG (crowd: 39,933)
Saturday, 31 July (2:10 pm)	Carlton 9.9 (63)	def. by	Fremantle 16.15 (111)	Optus Oval (crowd: 17,092)
Saturday, 31 July (7:10 pm)	Essendon 18.11 (119)	def.	Port Adelaide 11.13 (79)	Telstra Dome (crowd: 35,711)
Saturday, 31 July (7:10 pm)	Sydney 12.11 (83)	def.	Brisbane Lions 7.9 (51)	SCG (crowd: 34,926)
Sunday, 1 August (1:10 pm)	Geelong 15.11 (101)	def.	St Kilda 15.4 (94)	Skilled Stadium (crowd: 21,673)
Sunday, 1 August (2:10 pm)	Melbourne 15.17 (107)	def.	Hawthorn 9.9 (63)	MCG (crowd: 28,392)
Sunday, 1 August (2:10 pm)	West Coast 15.16 (106)	def.	Western Bulldogs 8.9 (57)	Subiaco Oval (crowd: 36,028)

=== Round 19 ===
	Round 19
Friday, 6 August (6:40 pm)	Fremantle 11.7 (73)	def. by	Collingwood 14.22 (106)	Subiaco Oval (crowd: 40,901)
Saturday, 7 August (1:10 pm)	St Kilda 14.7 (91)	def.	Adelaide 10.8 (68)	Aurora Stadium (crowd: 17,101)
Saturday, 7 August (2:10 pm)	Essendon 8.9 (57)	def. by	Carlton 10.14 (74)	MCG (crowd: 45,083)
Saturday, 7 August (7:10 pm)	Sydney 18.4 (112)	def. by	Kangaroos 17.16 (118)	SCG (crowd: 24,028)
Saturday, 7 August (7:10 pm)	Western Bulldogs 16.13 (109)	def. by	Hawthorn 18.12 (120)	Telstra Dome (crowd: 22,330)
Sunday, 8 August (1:10 pm)	Brisbane Lions 10.13 (73)	def. by	West Coast 12.15 (87)	The Gabba (crowd: 31,754)
Sunday, 8 August (2:10 pm)	Richmond 11.17 (83)	def. by	Geelong 16.18 (114)	MCG (crowd: 33,176)
Sunday, 8 August (2:10 pm)	Port Adelaide 18.17 (125)	def.	Melbourne 6.16 (52)	AAMI Stadium (crowd: 30,702)
The Kangaroos came from 40 points down at three-quarter time against Sydney to win by 6 points in Glenn Archer’s 250th game.

=== Round 20 ===
	Round 20
Friday, 13 August (7:40 pm)	Essendon 18.13 (121)	def.	Collingwood 13.9 (87)	MCG (crowd: 52,983)
Saturday, 14 August (2:10 pm)	Geelong 9.21 (75)	def.	Fremantle 3.7 (25)	Skilled Stadium (crowd: 15,209)
Saturday, 14 August (2:10 pm)	Hawthorn 6.7 (43)	def. by	Brisbane Lions 8.18 (66)	MCG (crowd: 17,159)
Saturday, 14 August (7:10 pm)	Melbourne 7.4 (46)	def. by	Sydney 10.7 (67)	Telstra Dome (crowd: 34,991)
Saturday, 14 August (7:10 pm)	Western Bulldogs 9.7 (61)	def. by	Port Adelaide 23.9 (147)	Marrara Oval (crowd: 13,271)
Sunday, 15 August (12:40 pm)	Adelaide 21.12 (138)	def.	Richmond 13.8 (86)	AAMI Stadium (crowd: 35,896)
Sunday, 15 August (2:10 pm)	Kangaroos 15.6 (96)	def. by	St Kilda 23.9 (147)	Telstra Dome (crowd: 41,664)
Sunday, 15 August (2:10 pm)	West Coast 15.21 (111)	def.	Carlton 6.13 (49)	Subiaco Oval (crowd: 39,631)

=== Round 21 ===
	Round 21
Friday, 20 August (7:40 pm)	Collingwood 9.16 (70)	def. by	Port Adelaide 16.11 (107)	MCG (crowd: 27,226)
Saturday, 21 August (2:10 pm)	Carlton 14.9 (93)	def.	Melbourne 8.14 (62)	Optus Oval (crowd: 22,254)
Saturday, 21 August (2:10 pm)	Adelaide 15.19 (109)	def.	Geelong 12.15 (87)	AAMI Stadium (crowd: 37,576)
Saturday, 21 August (7:10 pm)	Western Bulldogs 21.10 (136)	def.	Kangaroos 15.16 (106)	Telstra Dome (crowd: 24,741)
Saturday, 21 August (7:10 pm)	Sydney 17.8 (110)	def.	Essendon 12.18 (90)	Telstra Stadium (crowd: 46,440)
Sunday, 22 August (1:10 pm)	Brisbane Lions 20.10 (130)	def.	St Kilda 13.7 (85)	The Gabba (crowd: 35,823)
Sunday, 22 August (2:10 pm)	Hawthorn 16.13 (109)	def.	Richmond 13.8 (86)	MCG (crowd: 27,007)
Sunday, 22 August (2:10 pm)	Fremantle 6.9 (45)	def. by	West Coast 13.15 (93)	Subiaco Oval (crowd: 41,907)

=== Round 22 ===
	Round 22
Friday, 27 August (7:40 pm)	Collingwood 16.11 (107)	def. by	Carlton 17.6 (108)	MCG (crowd: 60,898)
Saturday, 28 August (2:10 pm)	Richmond 6.8 (44)	def. by	Sydney 16.12 (108)	MCG (crowd: 29,777)
Saturday, 28 August (2:10 pm)	West Coast 15.17 (107)	def.	Melbourne 10.7 (67)	Subiaco Oval (crowd: 39,882)
Saturday, 28 August (7:10 pm)	St Kilda 17.10 (112)	def.	Fremantle 12.11 (83)	Telstra Dome (crowd: 35,329)
Saturday, 28 August (7:10 pm)	Brisbane Lions 26.14 (170)	def.	Kangaroos 9.3 (57)	The Gabba (crowd: 33,122)
Sunday, 29 August (12:40 pm)	Adelaide 9.6 (60)	def. by	Port Adelaide 12.13 (85)	AAMI Stadium (crowd: 45,473)
Sunday, 29 August (2:10 pm)	Essendon 17.11 (113)	def.	Western Bulldogs 14.12 (96)	Telstra Dome (crowd: 39,894)
Sunday, 29 August (2:10 pm)	Geelong 17.21 (123)	def.	Hawthorn 9.4 (58)	Skilled Stadium (crowd: 21,192)
The Brisbane Lions' 113-point win was their biggest over the Kangaroos.; Port Adelaide finished the home and away season on top of the ladder for the third consecutive season.

== Ladder ==
2004 AFL ladder
Pos	Team	Pld	W	L	D	PF	PA	PP	Pts	
1	Port Adelaide (P)	22	17	5	0	2413	1823	132.4	68	Finals series
2	Brisbane Lions	22	16	6	0	2447	1783	137.2	64	Finals series
3	St Kilda	22	16	6	0	2443	1909	128.0	64	Finals series
4	Geelong	22	15	7	0	2088	1741	119.9	60	Finals series
5	Melbourne	22	14	8	0	2127	1900	111.9	56	Finals series
6	Sydney	22	13	9	0	1938	1804	107.4	52	Finals series
7	West Coast	22	13	9	0	2042	1968	103.8	52	Finals series
8	Essendon	22	12	10	0	2282	2228	102.4	48	Finals series
9	Fremantle	22	11	11	0	1882	1870	100.6	44	
10	Kangaroos	22	10	12	0	2142	2135	100.3	40	
11	Carlton	22	10	12	0	1825	2235	81.7	40	
12	Adelaide	22	8	14	0	1950	2039	95.6	32	
13	Collingwood	22	8	14	0	1899	2082	91.2	32	
14	Western Bulldogs	22	5	17	0	1957	2459	79.6	20	
15	Hawthorn	22	4	18	0	1668	2375	70.2	16	
16	Richmond	22	4	18	0	1693	2445	69.2	16	

Source: AFL ladder
Rules for classification: 1) points; 2) percentage; 3) number of points for.
(P) Premiers

=== Ladder progression ===
Numbers highlighted in green indicate that the team finished the round inside the top 8.
Numbers highlighted in blue indicates the team finished first on the ladder in that round.
Numbers highlighted in red indicates the team finished in last place on the ladder in that round.

Team ╲ Round	1	2	3	4	5	6	7	8	9	10	11	12	13	14	15	16	17	18	19	20	21	22
Port Adelaide	4	8	12	12	16	20	20	20	24	28	28	32	36	40	44	48	52	52	56	60	64	68
Brisbane Lions	4	8	12	12	16	16	20	24	24	28	32	36	36	40	44	48	52	52	52	56	60	64
St Kilda	4	8	12	16	20	24	28	32	36	40	40	40	44	44	44	48	52	52	56	60	60	64
Geelong	0	0	0	4	4	8	12	16	20	20	24	28	32	32	36	40	44	48	52	56	56	60
Melbourne	0	4	8	12	16	20	24	24	28	28	32	36	40	40	44	48	52	56	56	56	56	56
Sydney	0	4	8	12	12	12	12	12	16	20	24	24	28	32	36	36	36	40	40	44	48	52
West Coast	4	4	4	8	8	8	8	12	12	16	16	20	20	24	28	32	32	36	40	44	48	52
Essendon	0	0	4	8	12	16	20	24	24	28	32	32	32	32	36	36	36	40	40	44	44	48
Fremantle	4	4	8	12	16	20	20	20	24	24	24	28	28	32	32	36	40	44	44	44	44	44
Kangaroos	4	8	12	12	12	12	12	16	16	16	20	20	24	28	32	32	36	36	40	40	40	40
Carlton	0	4	4	4	8	8	12	12	12	12	16	20	24	24	24	28	28	28	32	32	36	40
Adelaide	0	0	0	0	4	4	8	8	8	12	12	12	16	20	20	20	20	24	24	28	32	32
Collingwood	0	4	4	4	4	4	4	4	8	12	16	16	16	20	20	20	24	28	32	32	32	32
Western Bulldogs	0	0	0	4	4	8	8	8	12	12	12	16	16	16	16	16	16	16	16	16	20	20
Hawthorn	4	4	4	4	4	4	4	8	8	8	8	8	8	8	8	8	8	8	12	12	16	16
Richmond	4	4	4	4	4	8	12	16	16	16	16	16	16	16	16	16	16	16	16	16	16	16

== Finals series ==
Qualifying and elimination finals
5 Sep, AAMI Stadium
1	Port Adelaide	18.9 (117)
4	Geelong	9.8 (62)
4 Sep, MCG
5	Melbourne	15.9 (99)
8	Essendon	15.14 (104)
4 Sep, Telstra Stadium
6	Sydney	11.9 (75)
7	West Coast	4.10 (34)
3 Sep, The Gabba
2	Brisbane Lions	23.11 (149)
3	St Kilda	10.9 (69)

Semi-finals
11 Sep, MCG
Geelong	10.14 (74)
Essendon	9.10 (64)
10 Sep, MCG
St Kilda	16.11 (107)
Sydney	8.8 (56)

Preliminary finals
17 Sep, AAMI Stadium
Port Adelaide	14.10 (94)
St Kilda	13.10 (88)
18 Sep, MCG
Brisbane Lions	12.12 (84)
Geelong	10.15 (75)

Grand final
25 Sep, MCG
Port Adelaide	17.11 (113)
Brisbane Lions	10.13 (73)

=== Week one ===
	Qualifying finals
QF1: Sunday, 5 September (2:00 pm)	Port Adelaide 18.9 (117)	def.	Geelong 9.8 (62)	AAMI Stadium (crowd: 39,250)
QF2: Friday, 3 September (7:30 pm)	Brisbane Lions 23.11 (149)	def.	St Kilda 10.9 (69)	The Gabba (crowd: 33,582)
St Kilda played in its first finals series since 1998.; Port Adelaide won in week one of the finals for the first time ever.

	Elimination finals
EF1: Saturday, 4 September (2:30 pm)	Melbourne 15.9 (99)	def. by	Essendon 15.14 (104)	MCG (crowd: 60,903)
EF2: Saturday, 4 September (7:30 pm)	Sydney 11.9 (75)	def.	West Coast 4.10 (34)	Telstra Stadium (crowd: 40,282)
West Coast were eliminated in the first week of the finals for the third consecutive year.; As of 2026, this is Essendon’s most recent finals victory.

=== Week two ===
	Semi-finals
SF2: Friday, 10 September (7:30 pm)	St Kilda 16.11 (107)	def.	Sydney 8.8 (56)	MCG (crowd: 50,671)
SF1: Saturday 11 September (7:30 pm)	Geelong 10.14 (74)	def.	Essendon 9.10 (64)	MCG (crowd: 53,356)
Essendon were eliminated in the second week of the finals for the third consecutive year.

=== Week three ===
	Preliminary finals
PF1: Friday, 17 September (7:30 pm)	Port Adelaide 14.10 (94)	def.	St Kilda 13.10 (88)	AAMI Stadium (crowd: 46,978)
PF2: Saturday, 18 September (7:30 pm)	Brisbane Lions 12.12 (84)	def.	Geelong 10.15 (75)	MCG (crowd: 55,768)
Port Adelaide qualified for its first ever AFL Grand Final.; Brisbane Lions played its "home" final at the MCG despite being ranked above Geelong due to the agreement then in place with the Melbourne Cricket Club that at least one game each week of the finals be played at the MCG.

=== Week four ===
	Grand final
Saturday, 25 September (2:30 pm)	Port Adelaide 17.11 (113)	def.	Brisbane Lions 10.13 (73)	MCG (crowd: 77,671)
This was the first grand final in the history of the AFL to be played by two non-Victorian teams; Port Adelaide's first; and the Brisbane Lions' fourth consecutive.

== Match attendance ==
Total match attendance for all games was 5,915,407. Attendance at the grand final was 77,671. The largest non-finals attendance was 60,898 people for the Collingwood v Carlton game in round 22.

Attendances during the season were affected by the ongoing reconstruction of the Ponsford, Olympic and Melbourne Cricket Club stands at the MCG to be ready for the 2006 Commonwealth Games.

== Awards ==
- The Brownlow Medal was awarded to Chris Judd of West Coast.
- The Leigh Matthews Trophy was awarded to Nick Riewoldt of St Kilda.
- The Coleman Medal was awarded to Fraser Gehrig of St Kilda.
- The Norm Smith Medal was awarded to Byron Pickett of Port Adelaide.
- The AFL Rising Star award was awarded to Jared Rivers of Melbourne.
- The Wooden Spoon was "awarded" to Richmond for coming last.

=== Coleman ===
	Player	1	2	3	4	5	6	7	8	9	10	11	12	13	14	15	16	17	18	19	20	21	22	Total
1	Fraser Gehrig	7	3	5	6	4	2	4	5	5	9	0	1	5	0	-	-	8	3	5	10	4	4	90
2	Matthew Lloyd	4	1	8	2	3	3	5	4	2	5	7	5	5	1	9	2	6	7	0	1	3	6	89
3	Warren Tredrea	6	5	4	2	2	4	7	0	3	1	2	4	2	2	6	3	6	3	6	0	3	4	75
4	Barry Hall	1	5	2	4	4	4	3	5	2	1	5	3	3	6	4	1	3	1	5	0	6	2	70
5	David Neitz	-	9	3	6	6	2	2	0	4	4	1	3	4	2	3	6	6	5	2	1	0	-	69
6	Brendan Fevola	3	5	4	2	6	2	6	0	3	1	7	6	8	-	-	1	3	1	0	1	4	3	66
7	Matthew Richardson	5	0	0	-	-	-	7	10	1	2	5	5	3	-	6	6	2	2	2	2	4	3	65
8	Phillip Matera	5	3	3	3	0	4	2	5	2	6	1	3	3	1	2	3	4	3	3	1	2	2	61
9	Nick Riewoldt	3	2	4	1	1	2	0	1	2	3	1	0	2	1	9	5	7	3	3	3	5	2	60
10	Saverio Rocca	-	-	-	-	-	-	-	3	2	1	8	2	3	5	6	1	2	2	5	4	3	2	49

== Notable events ==
- St Kilda won its first ten matches of the season, which was at that time the longest winning streak in its history. This record stood until 2009, when the Saints won 19 games in a row.
- A five-minute brawl broke out between rivals Hawthorn and Essendon in the round 11 match, after which one Bomber (Justin Murphy) and four Hawks players received suspensions totalling 16 matches, and a combined total of $70,700 of fines were handed out. 27 charges were brought before the AFL Tribunal, the most ever from a single game. The game is widely known as the "Line in the Sand" match, as the brawls were sparked in the third quarter after Hawthorn players were urged at a half-time address by club legend Dermott Brereton to metaphorically draw such a line; Brereton thought the young Hawks were being physically intimidated by the more experienced Bombers.
- In round 13, Geelong defeated the Brisbane Lions for the first time since the merged club was established in 1997. The win broke a 10-game winning streak for Brisbane against Geelong.
- After the round 13 win over the Western Bulldogs, Adelaide coach Gary Ayres was told by the board of directors that his contract would not be renewed for the next season, but would be allowed to coach the rest of 2004. Ayres subsequently resigned on the same day, without shaking hands or a word with the media. He was replaced by Neil Craig at first on a temporary basis, but then got the job permanently for 2005 and onwards.
- During the round 19 match between Sydney and the Kangaroos, Sydney head trainer Wally Jackson suffered a fatal heart attack during the last quarter. Most of the Sydney players were upset and distracted as Jackson was given CPR on the interchange bench; and despite Sydney having led the Kangaroos by 40 points at three-quarter time, they faded to lose by six points.
- With its round 22 win over Adelaide, Port Adelaide clinched its third consecutive minor premiership, a feat achieved by only two other clubs in the previous 50 seasons (Melbourne 1955–60; Essendon 1999–2001). This would later prove crucial in relation to home ground advantage at the preliminary final stage.
- Despite earning a home preliminary final by beating St Kilda two weeks earlier, the Brisbane Lions were forced to play Geelong in Melbourne at the MCG, due to an agreement between the AFL and the MCG to play at least one match per week at the ground in finals. This contractual stipulation was removed following renegotiation the following season.
- Essendon’s victory over Melbourne in the first week of the finals remains, as of the end of 2025, its most recent finals victory.
