= Steven Kretiuk =

Australian rules footballer

Personal information
- Born: 4 July 1972 (age 54)
- Original team: St Albans
- Debut: Round 12, 1992, Footscray vs. Fitzroy, at Princes Park
- Height: 183 cm (6 ft 0 in)
- Weight: 89 kg (196 lb)

Playing career^{1}
Years	Club	Games (Goals)
1992–2003	Western Bulldogs	170 (11)
- ^{1} Playing statistics correct to the end of 2003.

Steven Kretiuk (born 4 July 1972) is a former Australian rules footballer who played with the Western Bulldogs in the Australian Football League (AFL).

Kretiuk made his AFL debut against Fitzroy a month shy of 20 years old.

Kretiuk was a defender and spent over a decade at Footscray, with injuries preventing him from playing more games than the 170 he finished with. He finished second in the club's 1994 best and fairest awards.

In a Round 14 game from 2002, Kretiuk controversially targeted Essendon spearhead Matthew Lloyd's injured hand, causing outrage.

He played his final game in Round 22, 2003, against the Brisbane Lions.

Kretiuk is a personal trainer and football coach. He began his coaching career at Werribee Football Club in 2004, where he served as an assistant coach under Simon Atkins for four years. Kretiuk coached the Western Jets in the TAC Cup between 2008 and 2012. He held this position until 2012, during which time he completed his Level 2 and Level 3 high-performance coaching accreditation. In 2013, he served as a Melbourne-based opposition analyst for the Brisbane Lions. In 2014, he was appointed the senior coach of Hoppers Crossing Football Club, a position he held until 2022. He was succeeded by Adam Contessa in 2023, another former Bulldog.
