= Fraser Brown (Australian footballer) =

Australian rules footballer

Personal information
- Born: 18 August 1970 (age 56)
- Original team: Lilydale
- Debut: Round 1, 1989, Carlton vs. Footscray, at Princes Park
- Height: 181 cm (5 ft 11 in)
- Weight: 90 kg (198 lb)

Playing career^{1}
Years	Club	Games (Goals)
1989–2000	Carlton	177 (95)
- ^{1} Playing statistics correct to the end of 2000.

Career highlights
- Carlton best and fairest – 1998; Carlton premiership side – 1995

Fraser Brown (born 18 August 1970) is a former Australian rules footballer in the Australian Football League.

Originally from Lilydale, Victoria and known for his fierce style of play, Brown's highest achievements in football were playing in the 1995 premiership and winning the 1998 Carlton best and fairest.

Brown will long be remembered for his gripping tackle on Dean Wallis in the 1999 Preliminary Final against Essendon. With Carlton desperately hanging on a one-point lead, and with just seconds remaining, Brown laid a bear hug on Wallis as he tried to baulk him and run into an open goal from 50 metres out. Carlton won the match by a solitary point.

He retired from football at the end of the 2000 season.

== Family ==
Brown is the son of Joyce Brown, the former Australia netball international and national team head coach. His maternal grandfather, Doug Anderson, played for Fitzroy during the 1920s.

== Statistics ==
Legend
G	Goals	K	Kicks	D	Disposals	T	Tackles
B	Behinds	H	Handballs	M	Marks

Season	Team	No.	Games	Totals							Averages (per game)							Votes
Season	Team	No.	Games	G	B	K	H	D	M	T	G	B	K	H	D	M	T	Votes
1989	Carlton	20	7	1	5	69	25	94	19	18	0.1	0.7	9.9	3.6	13.4	2.7	2.6	0
1990	Carlton	20	7	2	2	49	31	80	11	5	0.3	0.3	7.0	4.4	11.4	1.6	0.7	0
1991	Carlton	20	7	1	1	66	56	122	14	9	0.1	0.1	9.4	8.0	17.4	2.0	1.3	0
1992	Carlton	20	22	10	5	314	176	490	71	31	0.5	0.2	14.3	8.0	22.3	3.2	1.4	8
1993	Carlton	20	23	21	12	294	178	472	62	46	0.9	0.5	12.8	7.7	20.5	2.7	2.0	0
1994	Carlton	20	23	19	16	269	213	482	57	39	0.8	0.7	11.7	9.3	21.0	2.5	1.7	2
1995†	Carlton	20	18	13	8	220	155	375	63	34	0.7	0.4	12.2	8.6	20.8	3.5	1.9	5
1996	Carlton	20	15	11	10	184	142	326	47	26	0.7	0.7	12.3	9.5	21.7	3.1	1.7	12
1997	Carlton	20	7	5	8	72	54	126	17	13	0.7	1.1	10.3	7.7	18.0	2.4	1.9	0
1998	Carlton	20	19	7	5	278	210	488	75	31	0.4	0.3	14.6	11.1	25.7	3.9	1.6	18
1999	Carlton	20	19	5	6	220	162	382	56	33	0.3	0.3	11.6	8.5	20.1	2.9	1.7	3
2000	Carlton	20	10	4	6	87	74	161	16	19	0.4	0.6	8.7	7.4	16.1	1.6	1.9	0
Career			177	99	84	2122	1476	3598	508	304	0.6	0.5	12.0	8.3	20.3	2.9	1.7	48
