= Damien Peverill =

Australian rules footballer, born 1979

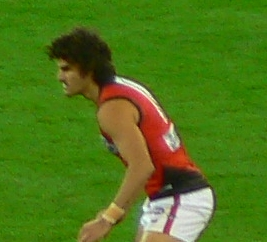
- Peverill playing for Essendon in 2007

Personal information
- Born: 12 July 1979 (age 47); Melbourne, Victoria
- Original team: Keilor Park Football Club
- Height: 186 cm (6 ft 1 in)
- Weight: 83 kg (183 lb)
- Positions: Midfielder, tagger

Playing career^{1}
Years	Club	Games (Goals)
2001–2008	Essendon	144 (32)
- ^{1} Playing statistics correct to the end of 2008.

Damien Peverill (born 12 July 1979) is a former Australian rules footballer who played for the Essendon Football Club in the Australian Football League (AFL). Peverill was known as a hard-working player whose no-nonsense approach to football, along with his consistency and ability to win plenty of the ball, were the hallmarks of his game.

== Early career ==
Peverill grew up in the Melbourne suburb of East Keilor and played his junior football at Keilor Park Football Club. He was passed over in four successive AFL drafts and three AFL pre-season drafts before being selected for Melbourne Football Club's rookie list. However, he was not able to break into the senior side there, and was delisted.

== Essendon rookie (2001) ==
A lifelong Essendon supporter, Peverill was placed on Essendon's rookie list in 2001 and was quickly elevated to the senior list due to the long-term injury of the prominent midfielder Joe Misiti prior to round 4. On debut, against Sydney at the SCG, he successfully tagged Swans playmaker Wayne Schwass and scored a late goal. As a rookie, he wore the number 45 jumper. After suffering an arm injury on ANZAC Day, Peverill returned the following week against West Coast Eagles. Over the following six weeks he became an important member of Essendon's midfield. Peverill was returned to the rookie list after round 12 clash due to the return of Misiti from injury. The team honoured Peverill's contribution as a rookie by allowing him to lead the players off the ground. The following week Peverill played in the Essendon reserve team and suffered another injury which kept him out for the remainder of the 2001 season.

== Essendon senior team (2002–2008) ==
Peverill was promoted to Essendon's senior list for the 2002 season and was given jumper number 11 following the departure of Damien Hardwick. He enjoyed what would be the best season of his career, playing 21 games and winning eight Brownlow votes despite wearing a cast on his arm for a good portion of the season.

Over his career, Peverill became a key player for Essendon, mainly as a tagger but also as a key midfielder. He was also known as one of the hardest-working players at training and considered a part of the club's leadership group. He played his 100th game in 2006.

Later form, however, was not up to the same standard of early senior years and his critics claimed a lack of pace and questionable disposal, particularly in relation to his kicking. Peverill did, however, lead Essendon in number of "disposals" and "hard ball gets" during 2007, despite limited action. He finished with 30 or more disposals in six games.

It was widely reported in May 2008 Essendon's then new senior coach, Matthew Knights had indicated to Peverill he would be given fewer playing opportunities for the remainder of the 2008 season, in order to develop the club's younger players for the future. Peverill did, however, make a successful return to the senior team midway through 2008 and enjoyed a prolific fortnight against Brisbane and Richmond, winning 24 disposals in the four-point loss to the Tigers in round 16.

Peverill was delisted by Essendon at the end of 2008 and played his last game for Essendon in round 22 alongside retirees Mal Michael, Jason Johnson and Adam Ramanauskas against St. Kilda. He indicated that he was keen to play on with another club in 2009, but was not successful in his attempt to be drafted.

== Post-AFL career ==
Peverill was the captain and playing assistant coach for the Collingwood Football Club reserves in the Victorian Football League (VFL) for the 2009 season. Peverill stated that he had not actively sought a coaching position, but had been approached by Collingwood who offered him the role. He left the club before the 2010 season.

In 2011 and 2012 Peverill played for the Aberfeldie Football Club in the Essendon District Football League and from 2013 has been an assistant senior coach for the club.
