= NRL SuperCoach =

Online football game

NRL SuperCoach is an online National Rugby League (NRL) fantasy football game in which participants take on the role of coach and select a team made of 25 Australian NRL rugby league players, working with a salary cap of $9.6 million and player trading limits.

Each week, participants can select a starting squad of 17 players from the team. The real-life performance of the 17 selected players determines the participant's points. Participants may also choose to play against other people by creating and joining a private league or by being placed in an international league competition.

NRL SuperCoach is one of Australia's biggest NRL fantasy football competitions, along with NRL Dream Team. According to dailytelegraph.com.au, in 2019 there are approximately 130,000 NRL SuperCoach participants.

NRL SuperCoach is run by dailytelegraph.com.au, The Daily Telegraph and The Sunday Telegraph newspapers in New South Wales, Australia. NRL SuperCoach is also available in Queensland at the Courier Mail, Gold Coast Bulletin and Townsville Bulletin.

In 2012, due to the popularity of NRL SuperCoach, AFL SuperCoach was run for the first time in New South Wales by dailytelegraph.com.au, The Daily Telegraph and The Sunday Telegraph.

== Point scoring ==
Points can be awarded or deducted based on the real life performances of the 17 players selected for each NRL round. Selected team captains are awarded double points for their performance. If any of the 17 selected players are unable to play in real life, an emergency player is automatically allocated. Meanwhile, the remaining substitutes on your reserves list do not score, but can increase in value.

As of 2019, Last Touch Assist was replaced with Try Contribution. Introduced in 2015, the Last Touch Assist (6 points) was created to more accurately award points to players who helped create try-scoring opportunities. The stat gave valuable points to the last person to touch the ball before a try was scored without awarding them a lucrative Try Assist (12 points) if they weren’t deserving of one. Worth four points, Try Contributions could be awarded to multiple players involved in a try-scoring play. In rare circumstances a player from the previous play could also pick up a Try Contribution if deemed worthy.

Points are awarded based on Fox Sports statistics and according to the following system:

Stat. description	Points awarded / deducted
Try	17 points
Try Assist	12 points
Try Contribution	4 points
Goal	4 points
Missed goal	-2 points
Field goal	5 points
Missed field goal	-1 point
2-point field goal	10 points
Tackle	1 point
Missed tackle	-1 point
Tackle break	2 points
Forced Drop Out/Forced Scrum	6 points
Effective Offload	4 points
Ineffective Offload	2 points
Line break	10 points
Line break assist	8 points
40/20 & 20/40	10 points
Kick and Regather Break	8 points
Hitup (all runs) (8 metres or more)	2 points
Hitup (all runs) (under 8 metres)	1 point
Holding attacking player up in goal	3 points
Intercept taken	5 points
Kick that goes dead	-3 points
Penalties conceded	-2 points
Error	-2 points
Sin Bin/Send Off	-8/-16 points

By using various statistics that cover all aspects and contributions of NRL players in various playing positions, the NRL SuperCoach scoring system presents an accurate way to determine how effective a player has been.

== Strategy ==
There are many strategies to employ, but the most consistent and basic theme is based around gathering young undervalued players early and selling them off once their value increases, replacing them with the stars of the NRL competition. The overall goal is to go into the finals with 19–20 of the top points gatherers in one's team, with the other 5–6 player spots typically being filled with cheap-priced players who don't score. This goal which can only be achieved through trading players as well as using the online resources provided such as player statistics, match information and expert opinion to get ahead.

== Picking a team ==
Each participant chooses a squad of 25 players according to salary cap and positional restrictions. Participants must select a 25-man squad according to the following positional requirements: 2 fullbacks, 7 wings/centres, 2 five-eighths, 2 halfbacks, 2 hookers, 4 front row forwards and 6 second row forwards.

Each week, participants choose 13 players in their starting line-up and 4 players from their remaining 12 'substitutes', whose contribution to a participant's NRL SuperCoach score is based on the player's real-life performance in that week's NRL round. Points are only scored by the 17 players selected for each game/round.

After selecting their 17 players, participants must select a team captain, who will score double points for the round. Participants may also pick a vice captain, who will score double points for the round if the selected captain scores 0 points for reasons such as not playing that round or being a late withdrawal.

Players traded during the season do not have their aggregate points added or subtracted to the participant's total. Participants can make up to 40 trades per season, with a maximum of 2 trades in any given round and 4 trades in the bye rounds. Trades must be made prior to the commencement of the next round and will be subject to the participant's salary cap.

In SuperCoach, NRL football players can be divided into three groups:

- Keepers (valued over $500,000) – the NRL's best players
- Sleepers ($220,000 – $500,000) – mid-range players who rise in value, allowing the player to upgrade them to Keepers
- Cheapies (below $220,000) – these are sold off for new cheapies once their prices rise, freeing up salary cap funds to upgrade Sleepers to Keepers.
- Traps (utilities of mid - to high value - Example - Luke Brooks) – these appear to be bargains after a big score, but may be moved around at the coach's will, depending on other injuries. This extends further to players in the NRL who can be considered to be elite but do not score high SuperCoach points. Such as Lewis Brown (Retired)

== Public and private leagues ==
In addition to the overall NRL SuperCoach competition, participants are able to be ranked and compete against others by joining one or more leagues. The "Psyche Out" chat feature enables SuperCoach players to communicate live with others in their league.

NRL SuperCoach Leagues can be public, private or social network based.

- A public league is where a SuperCoach participant is assigned to an open league of other NRL SuperCoach players.
- A private league allows participants to play NRL SuperCoach with others by creating their own league upon registering to play NRL SuperCoach or joining a specific private league.
- Facebook and Twitter private leagues can also be created by linking a participant's social network account to SuperCoach. This enables participants to play NRL SuperCoach against their Facebook or Twitter contacts. SuperCoach players will be ranked based on overall points against their participating Facebook contacts.

== SuperCoach Plus ==
SuperCoach Plus is an online subscription service to assist players of the SuperCoach NRL fantasy league game. It provides tips, recommendations, projections, player form, injury feeds and team selection news. SuperCoach Stats can also be accessed via the SuperCoach app.

In 2011, studies commissioned by thetelegraph.com.au indicated that 93% of SuperCoach Stats subscribers found it somewhat to very useful, and 72% said it improved their performance.

== SuperCoach app ==
SuperCoach is also accessible via an iOS or Android app. The app enables SuperCoach players to access their teams, SuperCoach Stats (if a subscriber), and continue gameplay on mobile devices.

== SuperCoach Finals ==
An extension of the main SuperCoach competition during the NRL finals series, SuperCoach Finals offers participants the chance to select a complete squad of seven players from any NRL club participating in the finals series. Squad selection must take into consideration a reduced salary cap, which teams are remaining in the finals race, and the requirement to fulfill each of the following playing positions:

QTY	Position
1x	Fullback
1x	Wing/Centre
1x	Five Eighth
1x	Halfback
1x	Front Row Forward
1x	Hooker
1x	Second Row Forward

Only teams with a full squad of seven players will earn points. When choosing a team for the upcoming week of finals, a team captain must also be nominated. The performance of the team captain will add double points towards the team score. Participants may also elect to play against other people by creating and joining a private league or by being placed in a public league.

=== Scoring system ===
Only the best six selected players will earn points. If any of them are unable to play, the seventh selected player will add points towards the team's total.

By using various statistics that cover all aspects and contributions of NRL players in various playing positions, SuperCoach Finals scoring system presents an accurate way to determine how effective a player has been.

Points are awarded based on the comprehensive scoring system, as highlighted below.

Stat Description	Points Awarded/Deducted
Tries	15 Points
Try Assists	10 Points
Goals	4 Points
Missed Goals	-2 Points
Field Goals	5 Points
Missed Field Goals	-1 Point
Tackles	1 Point
Missed Tackles	-1 Point
Offloads	4 Points
Line Breaks	8 Points
Line Break Assists	6 Points
40/20	10 Points
Hitups (all runs)	2 Points
Penalties Conceded	-2 Points
Errors	-2 Points
Sin Bin/Send offs	-8/-16 Points

== SuperCoach the Ultimate Guide ==
In 2011, 60,000 editions of SuperCoach the Ultimate Guide were printed and distributed in metropolitan Sydney. This document contained information including tips on selecting players; opinion articles from some of Australia's leading NRL journalists, Phil Rothfield and Tom Sangster; and NRL team player statistics.

For 2012, SuperCoach the Ultimate Guide was replaced by a special edition NRL magazine (also available as an app). This publication contains news, form guides, expert opinion and advice on tipping competitions such as SuperTipping. 2018 winner of SuperCoach NRL tipping was Grant Cameron of Sydney playing under the name of GCAM. It also includes an extensive subsection on NRL SuperCoach.

== Terms and definitions ==
- Auto-Emergency: the lowest scoring non-selected player who scores above zero. Used a replacement for any selected player who doesn't play.
- Gun: a player who is within the top 30 of the league
- Cash cow: a player purchased to make money
- Nuff: a player who can be purchased in SuperCoach, but is unlikely to play in any real-life NRL games.
- POD: Player/Point of Difference who sits at low percentage ownership, generally under 10%.
- Anti-POD: The act of not selecting a highly owned player in your team in order to differentiate (AKA Deathriding)
