= Barry Young (footballer) =

Australian rules footballer

Personal information
- Full name: Barry Young
- Born: 26 June 1970 (age 56)
- Original team: St Arnaud/Assumption College
- Height: 183 cm (6 ft 0 in)
- Weight: 93 kg (205 lb)

Playing career^{1}
Years	Club	Games (Goals)
1989 – 1993	Richmond	53 (23)
1994 – 1999	Essendon	76 (45)
2000	Hawthorn	13 (0)
Total		142 (68)
- ^{1} Playing statistics correct to the end of 2000.

Barry Young (born 26 June 1970) is a former Australian rules footballer who played with Richmond, Essendon and Hawthorn in the Victorian/Australian Football League (VFL/AFL).

Young, who could play both ends of the ground, began his league career at Richmond and made his debut in the 1989 VFL season. A St Arnaud and Assumption College recruit, he missed a total of eight games in 1990 through two separate suspensions, for kneeing in round one and striking later in the year. However, when he did play in 1990, he performed well enough to be selected in the Victorian team to play Tasmania. After his fifth season with Richmond, Young left the club and was selected with pick 20 by Kevin Sheedy's Essendon in the pre-season draft.

After a 19 disposal effort in Essendon's one point preliminary final loss to Sydney in 1996, Young suffered a series of injuries in 1997 and 1998 which limited his appearances. In 1999 he played 20 games for the first time, including another one point preliminary final loss. He averaged 16.55 disposals a game for the year and had seven Brownlow Medal votes, his best return. Young, who had eight visits to the AFL Tribunal during his career, left Essendon after failed contract negotiations and was picked up by Hawthorn for the 2000 season with the sixth selection of the pre-season draft. He spent just one season and his new club before announcing his retirement, with his last game being Hawthorn's semi final loss to the Kangaroos at the MCG.
