= Matthew Lloyd =

Australian rules footballer (born 1978)

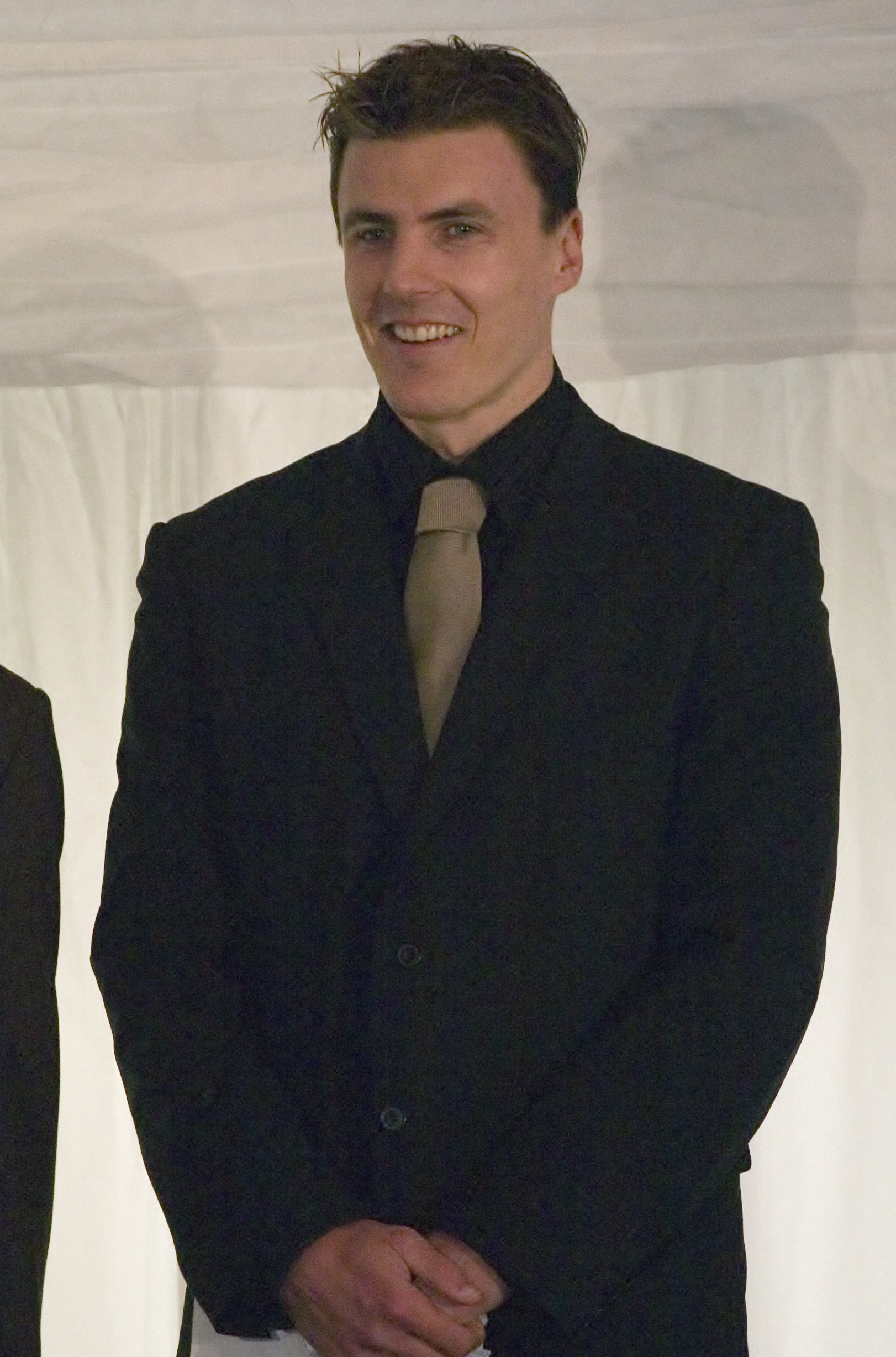
- Lloyd speaking at a function before the 2005 AFL Grand Final

Personal information
- Full name: Matthew James Lloyd
- Nicknames: Lloydy, Velvet Sledgehammer, Lordo
- Born: 16 April 1978 (age 48); Melbourne, Victoria
- Original team: Western Jets (TAC Cup)
- Draft: 1995 concession selection
- Debut: Round 14, 1995, Essendon vs. Adelaide, at the Melbourne Cricket Ground
- Height: 192 cm (6 ft 4 in)
- Weight: 93 kg (205 lb)
- Position: Full-forward

Playing career
Years	Club	Games (Goals)
1995–2009	Essendon	270 (926)

Representative team honours
Years	Team	Games (Goals)
1997–1999	Victoria	3 (8)

International team honours
2001	Australia	2 (4)

Career highlights
- AFL premiership player: 2000; Essendon captain: 2006–2009; 5× All-Australian team: 1998, 1999, 2000, 2001, 2003; 3× Coleman Medal: 2000, 2001, 2003; 12× Essendon leading goalkicker: 1997, 1998, 1999, 2000, 2001, 2002, 2003, 2004, 2005, 2007, 2008, 2009; Australian Football Hall of Fame (inducted 2013); Champions of Essendon: no. 22; Goal of the Year: 2007; Mark of the Year: 2008; Jim Stynes Medal: 2001; AFL Rising Star nominee: 1996

Matthew James Lloyd (born 16 April 1978) is a former professional Australian rules footballer who played for the Essendon Football Club in the Australian Football League (AFL).

A highly decorated full-forward, Lloyd's AFL's honours include being the eighth all-time leading goalkicker in the history of AFL/VFL, including three Coleman Medals as leading goalkicker in the league, AFL life membership, and winning both the Mark of the Year and Goal of the Year awards. Among his representative honours are five All-Australian selections, three times representing the Victoria State of Origin team, as well as twice representing Australia in International rules football.

Lloyd has kicked over 100 goals in a season twice. He also belongs to the relatively small group of players whose first kick in the AFL resulted in a goal. With 926 goals from 270 games, he holds the record for the most career goals at Essendon, including winning the leading goalkicker award 12 times—five more times than any other Bomber. Upon his retirement, the award was renamed the Matthew Lloyd Medal in his honour.

== Early life ==
Matthew Lloyd was born in Melbourne in 1978 to parents John (a former VFL footballer who played 29 games for the Carlton Football Club from 1965–1967) and Bev Lloyd. The Lloyds moved to Scotland for three years because of John's work, and it was there that Matthew picked up rugby and soccer playing for his Currie club.

Lloyd attended St Martin De Porres Parish Primary School in Avondale Heights before moving to St. Bernard's College in Essendon. He played junior football for Avondale Heights Football Club in the Essendon District Football League.

He supported the Fitzroy Football Club when he was young because in the first game he attended, Fitzroy player Bernie Quinlan kicked nine goals.

== Career ==
=== AFL ===
Lloyd was drafted into the AFL as a 16-year-old in the 1995 Pre-season Draft as a "compensatory selection" that was awarded to Essendon by the AFL in return for losing Todd Ridley to the newly formed Fremantle Football Club. The Bombers picked up what would be one of their all-time greats for a relative pittance in the draft. Lloyd was heralded as a future football star after his AFL debut in Round 14, 1995, where he scored a goal with his first kick in league football and three for the match.

The key features of Lloyd's game were his powerful marks on the lead (particularly overhead), his use of his body in a defensive capacity and accurate goal kicking, particularly from set shots on his left foot. He converted a large majority of set shots inside the 50-metre arc and kicked further than 50 metres on a regular basis.

Lloyd was known for his ritual when taking set shots at goal. Almost every time, he took time to go far back on the mark, pull both his socks up, and then grab some grass and throw it into the air to measure the wind and take a very long run-up before kicking; this was his method of following advice given to him by coaches to bring down his heart rate in order to focus better. In 2006, the AFL introduced a "shot clock" to limit the amount of time that players had to take set shots; although Lloyd's ritual was not the longest in the league, its quirks made it so well known that the rule became commonly known as the "Lloyd Rule". Lloyd adjusted his ritual to fit into the new rule, and he still retained the most famous aspect (throwing grass) until the end of his career.

Lloyd's goal-scoring ability enabled him to top the Essendon goal scoring every year from 1997 to 2009, except for 2006 when he only played three games due to a serious hamstring injury.

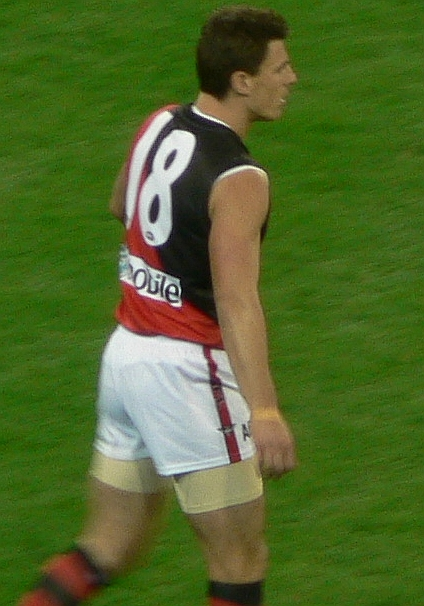
Lloyd in the 2007 AFL season

Lloyd was selected in the All-Australian team on five occasions (1998, 1999, 2000, 2001, 2003), won the Coleman Medal for kicking the most goals in the regular season three times (2000, 2001 and 2003) and twice kicked more than 100 goals in a completed season (109 in 2000 and 105 in 2001; on both occasions he reached the milestone during the finals).

Lloyd was a member of Essendon's 2000 premiership team and was captain of Essendon from 2006 to 2009. He was recognised for his achievements at Essendon in 2002 when he was ranked the 22nd-greatest player ever to play for the club in the "Champions of Essendon" list.

Lloyd was appointed Essendon captain ahead of the 2006 season after James Hird elected to stand down following the side's disappointing 2005 season. Lloyd's first match as Essendon captain resulted in a 27-point win over the defending premiers Sydney, where he kicked eight goals (six of them in the first quarter alone). It would be the only win that Essendon would enjoy under Lloyd's captaincy until they beat Brisbane in Round 17.

In addition to serving as captain and earning life membership at Essendon, Lloyd is also the team's all-time-highest goal scorer.

In 2013, Lloyd was inducted as a member of the Australian Football Hall of Fame and as a Legend in the Essendon Football Club Hall of Fame.

=== State of Origin ===
Lloyd had a successful State of Origin career, kicking 8 goals in 3 games. He first played for Victoria in 1997, against South Australia, kicking 3 goals, including a snap kick along the ground from near the boundary line, which went one way and then curved back another. In 1998, Lloyd kicked two goals against The Allies, in Brisbane. Lloyd last played for Victoria in 1999 against South Australia in the second-last-ever State of Origin game, kicking 3 goals and being named in the best players.

== Career highlights ==
In Round 20, 2007, Lloyd kicked a backheel goal whilst surrounded by opponents and was awarded the 2007 Goal of the Year.

In Round 18, 2008, against the Melbourne Demons, Lloyd took a spectacular mark above five players to win the 2008 Mark of the Year. Immediately after the mark, Lloyd recalled in a 2022 episode of The Sunday Footy Show that he roasted his opponent Matthew Warnock afterwards:

"You've always wanted to be on a footy card; now you'll probably be on one."

A haul of eight goals in that match gave Lloyd his best return since Round 1, 2006.

=== Performances against the Sydney Swans ===
In Round 3, 1999, Lloyd, aged just 21 at the time, kicked a record 13 goals against the Sydney Swans at the MCG, kicking the first goal of the game and breaking John Coleman's record for most goals kicked by an Essendon player against the Swans.

In his first game as Essendon captain, also playing against the Sydney Swans, Lloyd kicked eight goals (six in the first quarter against his opponent, Leo Barry) He kicked a total of 69 goals playing against the Swans throughout his career.

== Injuries ==
During Essendon's 1996 preliminary final against the Sydney Swans in Sydney, Lloyd ruptured his spleen in the second quarter. He suffered a large amount of blood loss and spent 10 days in intensive care in a Sydney hospital.

In Round 6, 2002, against Fremantle, Lloyd ruptured a tendon in his right ring finger when it was caught in his opponent's guernsey. It required surgery to be reattached, and he was out for eight weeks.

Lloyd returned in Round 14 against the Western Bulldogs when Steven Kretiuk controversially targeted his injured hand.

Midway through the third quarter of the Essendon vs. Western Bulldogs match on 16 April 2006 (which happened to be Lloyd's 28th birthday), opponent Brian Harris accidentally fell on Lloyd as he tried to mark the ball. Lloyd walked off the ground with the aid of trainers and did not return for the rest of the match. Following scans, a week later it was revealed that the hamstring tendon had been snapped off the bone. Surgery to repair the career-threatening injury took place, which ruled him out for the rest of the season. Lloyd's absence from the team was felt hard, as the Bombers, despite high expectations, finished 15th on the ladder at season's end with a final win-loss record of 3–1–18. As Lloyd was captain of Essendon and was unable to play for the remainder of the season (his first year of captaincy, in fact), David Hille was promoted to team captain in Lloyd's absence.

Lloyd made a successful comeback against Adelaide at AAMI Stadium in Round 1, 2007. He kicked two goals while working further up the ground, putting to rest any concerns about his injured hamstring. Essendon beat Adelaide by 31 points.

== Brad Sewell incident ==
In Round 22, 2009, Lloyd hit Hawthorn player Brad Sewell with a heavy bump that left him unconscious and with facial injuries, and it led to a brawl between the two teams. The Essendon–Hawthorn rivalry is fierce, first reaching a flashpoint in the 1980s and peaking in the infamous Line in the Sand Match in 2004. In the bitter aftermath of the 2009 match in which four players were suspended for a total of seven matches and $27,000 in fines were handed out, Hawthorn's Campbell Brown called Lloyd "one of the biggest snipers in the game" and said that "his time is coming". Hawthorn coach Alastair Clarkson threatened Lloyd and abused an interchange steward and had to be restrained by Hawthorn football manager Mark Evans as the teams left the field. AFL CEO Andrew Demetriou defended Lloyd's reputation; Clarkson was fined for his comments and later apologised for the outburst.

Essendon went on to win the match by 17 points after trailing by 22 points at the time of the incident, and in the week after the match, Lloyd was given a six-match suspension by the match review panel for the hit on Sewell. This was reduced to four matches after he decided not to appeal the sanction. Lloyd only served one match of his suspension, missing Essendon's 96-point elimination final loss to Adelaide at AAMI Stadium, before announcing his retirement on 23 September 2009.

== Statistics ==
Legend
G	Goals	K	Kicks	D	Disposals	T	Tackles
B	Behinds	H	Handballs	M	Marks

Led the league for the season only
Led the league after finals only
Led the league after season and finals

Season	Team	No.	Games	Totals							Averages (per game)						
Season	Team	No.	Games	G	B	K	H	D	M	T	G	B	K	H	D	M	T
1995	Essendon	18	5	7	6	31	17	48	22	1	1.4	1.2	6.2	3.4	9.6	4.4	0.2
1996	Essendon	18	11	18	7	78	34	112	46	11	1.6	0.6	7.1	3.1	10.2	4.2	1.0
1997	Essendon	18	20	63	33	212	125	272	125	17	3.2	1.7	10.6	3.0	13.6	6.3	0.9
1998	Essendon	18	23	70	38	249	77	326	156	24	3.0	1.7	10.8	3.3	14.2	6.8	1.0
1999	Essendon	18	22	87	40	239	54	293	142	22	4.0	1.8	10.9	2.5	13.3	6.5	1.0
2000	Essendon	18	25	109	60	323	68	391	186	21	4.4	2.4	12.9	2.7	15.6	7.4	0.8
2001	Essendon	18	21	105	36	244	49	293	158	23	5.0	1.7	11.6	2.3	14.0	7.5	1.1
2002	Essendon	18	16	47	29	143	40	183	96	11	2.9	1.8	8.9	2.5	11.4	6.0	0.7
2003	Essendon	18	22	93	30	204	66	270	140	21	4.2	1.4	9.3	3.0	12.3	6.4	1.0
2004	Essendon	18	24	96	39	228	49	277	134	35	4.0	1.6	9.5	2.0	11.5	5.6	1.5
2005	Essendon	18	20	59	29	181	51	232	104	23	3.0	1.5	9.1	2.6	11.6	5.2	1.2
2006	Essendon	18	3	13	3	34	17	51	23	1	4.3	1.0	11.2	5.7	17.0	7.7	0.3
2007	Essendon	18	19	62	31	214	59	273	124	33	3.3	1.6	11.3	3.1	14.4	6.5	1.7
2008	Essendon	18	21	62	16	199	83	282	144	35	3.0	0.8	9.5	4.0	13.4	6.9	1.7
2009	Essendon	18	18	35	27	131	88	219	104	26	1.9	1.5	7.3	4.9	12.2	5.8	1.4
Career			270	926	424	2710	812	3522	1704	304	3.4	1.6	10.0	3.0	13.0	6.3	1.1

== Honours and achievements ==
Brownlow Medal votes
Season	Votes
1995	0
1996	3
1997	7
1998	5
1999	9
2000	14
2001	15
2002	6
2003	14
2004	10
2005	3
2006	3
2007	0
2008	5
2009	3
Total	97

- Team
  - AFL Premiership (Essendon): 2000
  - McClelland Trophy (Essendon): 1999, 2000, 2001
  - Pre-Season Cup (Essendon): 2000
- Individual
  - Coleman Medal: 2000, 2001, 2003
  - All-Australian: 1998, 1999, 2000, 2001, 2003
  - Essendon F.C. Leading Goalkicker: 1997, 1998, 1999, 2000, 2001, 2002, 2003, 2004, 2005, 2007, 2008, 2009
  - Essendon F.C. Captain: 2006–2009
  - Australian Representative Honours in International Rules Football: 2001
  - Jim Stynes Medal: 2001
  - Goal of the Year: 2007
  - Alex Jesaulenko Medal – Mark of the Year: 2008
  - AFL Rising Star Nominee: 1996 (Round 19)
  - Champions of Essendon – No. 22
  - Australian Football Hall of Fame inductee

== Retirement ==
On 23 September 2009, Lloyd announced his retirement to a packed media conference at the Essendon Football Club Hall of Fame. Although he had been offered another contract, Lloyd said that "now is my time from a physical and mental point of view" and that he would "...prefer to go a year too early than a year too late."

To celebrate Lloyd's career, the Coventry End of Docklands Stadium is renamed the Lloyd End for Essendon home games.

In 2009, Lloyd was appointed assistant coach at the AIS-AFL Academy; however, he ruled out applying for an AFL coaching position.

== Media work ==
Lloyd co-hosted children's AFL show Auskick'n Around on Fox Footy Channel with Brad Johnson from the Western Bulldogs from 2003 until it was cancelled at the end of 2005.

In 2006, Lloyd had a weekly spot as a panellist on Fox Footy's White Line Fever, and, after being forced to spend extended time off the field because of injury, he became recognised for his informative views on all things football—his roles included being a special comments commentator on Triple M's football coverage as well as more regular appearances on The AFL Footy Show as a panellist.

In 2009, Lloyd appeared as a regular panellist on a new show, One Week at a Time, as well as doing special comments on Network Ten and writing a regular column for The Age newspaper. Following his retirement, Lloyd has been heavily involved in the media.

Lloyd signed with the Network Ten AFL team as an expert commentator for the 2010 and 2011 AFL seasons on Channel Ten and One HD (he had already provided special commentary during various matches of the 2009 AFL season for the network), until Ten Sport lost the rights at the end of the 2011 AFL season. He also worked for radio station SEN, was a co-host of The Game Plan on One HD during 2011, and continued working for The Age.

Lloyd's autobiography (co-authored with Andrew Clarke), Straight Shooter, was released in July 2011.

After Network Ten lost the AFL broadcasting rights, Lloyd joined the Nine Network for 2012 to be a panellist on The Footy Show and The Sunday Footy Show. He also left SEN to join 3AW's AFL special comments team.

In 2013, he joined Footy Classified as a panellist alongside Gary Lyon, Craig Hutchison and Caroline Wilson; as well as continuing his regular roles on The Sunday Footy Show and 3AW Football. Lloyd is also a recurring panellist on The Footy Show and on occasion appears on Nine News Melbourne to provide insights into the weekly round of matches.

In March 2022, Lloyd announced on Footy Classified that he had Bell's palsy, a form of facial paralysis.

== Coaching career ==
On 14 November 2014, it was announced that Lloyd would return to the Essendon Football Club as a part-time forwards coach, working closely with the club's forwards.

He currently coaches the school football side at Haileybury College in Melbourne.

== Personal life ==
Lloyd's parents are John and Bev Lloyd. John Lloyd played 29 games for Carlton from 1965–1967 and coached the Braybrook Football Club to three premierships. The family moved to Scotland for three years because of John Lloyd's work and it was there that Lloyd played rugby and soccer for his Currie club.

Lloyd has two older brothers, Simon, who is an assistant coach at the Geelong Football Club, and Brad, who is a former Hawthorn player (and former captain of the Williamstown Football Club) and now head of football at the Carlton Football Club, as well as one older sister, Kylie, who is the Finance Manager at Nine Network Australia.

On 9 November 2002, Lloyd married his childhood sweetheart, Lisa-Marie Caparello, usually known as "Lisa", at Xavier College Chapel. Their wedding was covered by New Idea magazine, and a documentary of the day, titled One Day in November, was also aired on Fox Footy Channel. Lisa Lloyd appeared on The Footy Show's singing competition, Screamers, in 2005 and was also a regular presenter on Fox Footy's Living With Footballers.

The Lloyds have three children: Jaeda Ruby (born December 2006), Kira Grace (born September 2009), and Jacob Matthew (born November 2012).
