= Justin Murphy (Australian rules footballer) =

Australian rules footballer (born 1976)

Personal information
- Full name: Justin Murphy
- Born: 24 April 1976 (age 50); Launceston, Tasmania
- Original team: Kew (Vic)/De La Salle College OC (Vic)/Sandringham Dragons (Vic)
- Draft: No. 3, 1993 national draft
- Debut: Round 11, 4 June 1994, Richmond vs. Essendon, at Optus Oval
- Height: 185 cm (6 ft 1 in)
- Weight: 85 kg (187 lb)

Playing career^{1}
Years	Club	Games (Goals)
1994–1995	Richmond	12 (9)
1996–2000	Carlton	79 (76)
2001	Geelong	18 (9)
2002–2003	Carlton	36 (29)
2004–2005	Essendon	40 (28)
Total		185 (151)
- ^{1} Playing statistics correct to the end of 2005.

Career highlights
- 1999 Grand Final team (v Kangaroos)

Justin Murphy (born 24 April 1976) is a former Australian rules footballer who played for the Richmond Football Club, the Carlton Football Club (twice), the Geelong Football Club and the Essendon Football Club of the Australian Football League (AFL).

== Early life ==
Murphy was raised in Victoria, and is of Indigenous Australian descent. He attended John Gardiner Secondary College and played junior Australian football with the Central Dragons (now Sandringham).

== AFL playing career ==
Murphy played 185 games in the AFL at four different clubs.

=== Richmond (1994–1995) ===
Murphy was recruited by Richmond at number 3 in the 1993 National Draft. He made a sensational start to his senior playing career when he kicked five goals for the Tigers in his debut in Round 11, 1994 against Essendon. After he clashed with Richmond senior coach John Northey, and doubts about his discipline began to emerge, Murphy was traded to Carlton at the end of the 1995 season.

Murphy played for Richmond from 1994 until 1995 for a total of 12 games and kicked 9 goals.

=== Carlton (1996–2000) ===
Murphy was traded to Carlton at the end of the 1995 season. At Carlton, Murphy was then allocated guernsey number 18, and made his debut for Carlton in the opening round of 1996 against Collingwood. Murphy notched up 19 possessions, 6 marks, 7 tackles and his first goal for his new club. Rounding off an impressive year, he played finals football for the first time, although the Blues didn't lift when they needed to, and were eliminated by successive losses.

He is remembered as the player who was holding the ball in his hands when the final siren sounded in Carlton's upset 1-point win against Essendon in the 1999 Preliminary Final.

At the end of the 2000 season, after Murphy didn't see eye to eye with Carlton senior coach Wayne Brittain, Murphy was traded to Geelong.

Murphy played for Carlton from 1996 until 2000 for a total of 79 games and kicked a total of 76 goals.

=== Geelong (2001) ===
After Murphy was traded to Geelong, he played a total of 18 games and kicked a total of 9 goals in his only season at the club in the 2001 season.

=== Return to Carlton (2002–2003) ===
Murphy was traded back to Carlton at the end of the 2001 season. After he was traded back to Carlton, Murphy and Carlton senior coach Wayne Brittain appeared to settle their differences this time around. but the 2002 season turned into an unmitigated disaster for the club. Decimated Carlton was in a rough time. Brittain was sacked as senior coach of Carlton at the end of the 2002 season, having overseen the Blues’ first-ever wooden spoon, while the entire playing list was subjected to intense scrutiny. Although Murphy's statistics for the year had been relatively good where played 20 games, 15 goals, average 19.5 disposals per game.

In 2003, Carlton's disarray continued after being found guilty of breaching AFL salary cap rules. Murphy found this period tough and averaged just 14 disposals in his 16 matches in the 2003 season. Murphy then had a falling-out with Carlton senior coach Denis Pagan and the match committee and then requested a trade to Essendon at the end of the 2003 season.

Murphy in his second tenure with Carlton from 2002 until 2003 played a total of 36 games and kicked a total of 29 goals.

=== Essendon (2004–2005) ===
Murphy was traded to Essendon at the end of the 2003 season.

He was involved in the infamous "Line in the Sand" match while playing for Essendon in 2004 and was the only Essendon player to be handed a match suspension after the game.

Murphy announced his retirement after he was delisted by Essendon after the conclusion of the 2005 AFL season.

Murphy played for Essendon from 2004 until 2005 for a total of 40 games and kicked a total of 28 goals.

== Post-AFL career ==
In 2006, Murphy joined the Heidelberg Football Club in Melbourne's Diamond Valley Football League (later known as the Northern Football League). He played six seasons with the Tigers, in which time he played more than 100 games and won four Premierships.

In 2012, he played for the Tatura Football Club in the Goulburn Valley Football League, winning a premiership there; he played for Numurkah in the Murray Football League in early 2013, and returned to Heidelberg in late 2013, then moved to Knox in the Eastern Football League in 2014. Murphy has also played summer seasons in the Northern Territory Football League with Waratah.

== Criminal convictions ==
In 2008, Murphy was convicted of stealing a woman's purse as it lay unattended on the counter of a Williamstown bank. It was also reported that he failed to pay an ordered $400 donation to a Black Saturday bushfire appeal that was part of his penalty for the theft.

In 2010, Murphy was arrested when police found two bags of crystal methamphetamine in his car. After initially telling police the drugs were his, in court his lawyer claimed he had been claiming to protect his wife. Murphy pleaded guilty to one charge of possession of a drug of dependence and was released without charge on a 12-month good behaviour bond. His lawyer also made an unsuccessful bid to suppress the details of the charge.

In 2017, Murphy was sentenced to 6 months in prison after pleading guilty to 28 charges, including unlawful assault, aggravated burglary and making threats to kill. The charges related to a series of attacks on his former partner, Jill Scott, one of which involved him holding her down and burning her finger with a blowtorch. As a result of her injuries, she had to have her finger amputated. Murphy blamed his actions on his addiction to the drugs meth and GHB. Murphy was jailed again for 59 days in early 2020 after being convicted of further acts of physical and financial abuse against Scott. His release from imprisonment was conditional on observing a community correction order for 12 months and entering into drug rehabilitation.
