= Fantasy football (Australian rules) =

Type of fantasy sport

A screenshot of a team in the Footytips competition.

In fantasy football, a type of fantasy sport, players assemble and manage virtual teams of real Australian rules footballers. Teams score points based on their footballers' performance in real-world matches. Players compete against all other participants in a fantasy football competition, but may also form smaller leagues, often with friends or co-workers. Most fantasy football competitions use players from the Australian Football League (AFL), although several competitions based on the AFL Women's (AFLW) have emerged.

Fantasy football competitions based on a salary cap are the most popular. Under this format, the competition's administrators price every footballer based on their estimated scoring potential. Players receive a limited amount of virtual currency to spend on footballers for their squad. During the season, footballers' prices rise, fall or stagnate, depending on their weekly performances. Every round, players may opt to trade a limited number of footballers to improve their teams, subject to the salary cap. In another common format, players instead select footballers for their teams through a virtual draft. Unlike under the salary-cap format, no two players in a league may own the same footballer. Daily fantasy football, an emerging type, sees players assemble teams for a single game or single week rather than an entire season. In this format, players generally pay a fee to participate.

For season-long formats, the two major fantasy football competitions are AFL SuperCoach, operated by News Corp Australia, and AFL Fantasy, operated by the AFL itself. Draftstars and Moneyball are notable competitions in daily fantasy football.
