= AFL SuperCoach =

Online fantasy football game

- Screenshot of a supercoach team
- Website type: Sports
- Available in: English
- Headquarters: Australia
- Owner: Herald Sun
- Website: https://supercoach.heraldsun.com.au/
- Launched: 2006
- Current status: Public

AFL SuperCoach is an online fantasy football game for the Australian Football League. It was designed by Vapormedia. Herald Sun own the website, and run the competition. They award a prize of $1,000 each week (increased to $2,000 for SuperCoach Plus subscribers) to the entrant with the highest score for that week, as well as a grand prize of $50,000 to the entrant with the highest cumulative point total at the end of the home-and-away season.

== Popularity ==
Year	Number of players
2009	349,124
2010	390,367
2011	401,840
2012	374,120
2013	313,564
2014	250,278
2015	224,129
2016	223,324
2017	206,997
2018	199,094
2019	207,341
2020	170,756
2021	170,847
2023	190,911*

- There are thousands of dummy accounts with many players creating a second account under another name with an aim solely to win the weekly prize in one of the Bye rounds where legitimate teams have players missing

== Point Scoring ==
Each AFL player scores points for their performance in their game in each round.

By using Champion Data's comprehensive rankings system of over 50 different stats, player rankings are the most accurate way to determine how effective a player has been. You can be sure that a high-scoring player is giving his team maximum value. Unlike other stats systems, Champion Data will not simply award a point for each kick, mark or handball. For example, while other games will award points for a kick no matter how far it goes or where it's directed, Champion Data will award zero points for a kick that travels less than 40 meters to a contest.

Point Scoring
Stat	Awarded/Deducted
Effective kick	4 Points
Ineffective kick	0 Points
Clanger kick	-4 Points
Effective handball	1.5 Points
Ineffective handball	0 Points
Handball clanger	-4 Points
Handball receive	1.5 Points
Hardball get	4.5 Points
Loose-ball get	4.5 Points
Goal	8 Points
Behind	1 Point
Mark uncontested (maintaining possession)	2 Points
Mark contested (maintaining possession)	6 Points
Mark uncontested (from opposition)	4 Points
Mark contested (from opposition)	8 Points
Tackles	4 Points
Free kick for	4 Points
Free kick against	-4 Points
Hitout to advantage	5 Points
Gather from hitout	2 Points

== Team structure and setup ==
Teams have a salary cap of $10,000,000, and are required to select 31 players.

There are 5 groups of positions:

Defenders - 6 on-field players and 2 on bench.

Midfielders - 8 on-field players and 3 on bench.

Rucks - 2 on-field players and 1 on bench.

Forwards - 6 on-field players and 2 on bench.

Flex - 1 on-field player of any position.

=== Captains and vice captains ===
For each round, entrants set a captain, for which their score is doubled. A vice captain is also selected, who gets their score doubled if the player selected as captain does not play.

=== Emergencies ===
Emergencies are used on up to four players on the bench. If a player on the field does not play, the emergency's score for that position (defender, midfielder, ruck or forward) comes on. If there are 2 emergencies in one position, the lowest scoring player comes on for that position (except for players that scored less than 1 point). The Flex player does not have an emergency.

=== Substitutions ===
You can substitute a player at anytime until their match starts. If the player is midfield, the player can only be substituted for a player on the bench from the midfield that is also yet to play. If you have a player listed as midfield and forward, they can be swapped with another player listed as midfield and forward.

=== Trades ===
Each entrant is allocated 40 trades and can perform a maximum of 2 per week (3 in multi-bye rounds), with 5 trade boosts that offer an extra trade per round. Trades can be reversed until the start of the first match for each round.

== Leagues and Groups ==
You can join or be part of 10 leagues. When you join, you will automatically be entered in a league. You will compete head-to-head each round with other people in the league. The league will have its own fixture with 4 points for a win, 2 points for a draw and 0 points for a loss. Public leagues are with random people, while private leagues have a join code. There is a Finals series played out over the last rounds of the AFL season.

Groups are based on the total number of points and can have an unlimited number of teams.

== Supercoach Plus ==
Costing $29.95 annually, it helps by having a team picker before you can register, optimiser to predict the best possible line up, breakevens, projected scores and players price increases, prediction if players will perform well or poor for the week, bye round indicators, access to Supercoach Plus articles and double prizes for the weekly cash winners.

== Records ==
In Round 7 2006, Jonathan Brown got the highest-ever SuperCoach score—262—against Hawthorn. He got 18 kicks, 7 handballs, 16 marks, 8 goals, 4 behinds, 1 tackle and 1 free kick for. As of March 31, 2025, it remains the record.
