= Dean Wallis =

Australian rules footballer

Personal information
- Full name: Dean Wallis
- Born: 27 August 1969 (age 57)
- Original team: Nhill
- Height: 190 cm (6 ft 3 in)
- Weight: 91 kg (201 lb)
- Position: Defender

Playing career^{1}
Years	Club	Games (Goals)
1987–2001	Essendon	127 (42)
- ^{1} Playing statistics correct to the end of 2001.

Career highlights
- Essendon premiership player: 1993, 2000

Dean Wallis (born 27 August 1969) is a former Australian rules footballer for the Essendon Football Club of the AFL.

Originally from Nhill, due to his physical style of play Wallis became known as one of the AFL's toughest players. He won premierships with the club in 1993 and 2000, and played 127 VFL/AFL games in his 14 seasons with the Bombers.

After retiring as a player, he became an assistant coach. In 2002 and 2003, Wallis was an assistant coach to Grant Thomas at St.Kilda before again returning to Windy Hill to take up an assistant coaching role. He left the club after Matthew Knights was appointed as senior coach in 2008, and he moved to the Fremantle Football Club as an assistant coach. At the conclusion of the 2010 AFL season, he returned to Essendon as a development coach, following Knights' replacement as senior coach by James Hird.

In 2011, Wallis was suspended from coaching for 14 games and fined $7500 by the AFL for betting on league games in violation of anti-gambling rules. In 2015, Dean took up the senior coaching role of Essendon Doutta Stars in the EDFL and was a premiership coach in his first year at the helm. In 2016, Wallis continued as senior coach at Essendon Doutta Stars.

His son, Tom, was drafted by Essendon in the 2016 rookie draft under the father–son rule.

== Playing statistics ==
Legend
G	Goals	K	Kicks	D	Disposals	T	Tackles
B	Behinds	H	Handballs	M	Marks

Season	Team	No.	Games	Totals							Averages (per game)						
Season	Team	No.	Games	G	B	K	H	D	M	T	G	B	K	H	D	M	T
1987	Essendon	21	11	2	0	76	38	114	21	31	0.2	0.0	6.9	3.5	10.4	1.9	2.8
1988	Essendon	21	13	9	3	81	30	111	29	23	0.7	0.2	6.2	2.3	8.5	2.2	1.8
1989	Essendon	21	9	2	6	67	38	105	27	14	0.2	0.7	7.4	4.2	11.7	3.0	1.6
1990	Essendon	21	0	—	—	—	—	—	—	—	—	—	—	—	—	—	—
1991	Essendon	21	7	1	1	42	33	75	14	15	0.1	0.1	6.0	4.7	10.7	2.0	2.1
1992	Essendon	21	12	6	11	78	34	112	48	20	0.5	0.9	6.5	2.8	9.3	4.0	1.7
1993†	Essendon	21	8	2	7	45	21	66	27	8	0.3	0.9	5.6	2.6	8.3	3.4	1.0
1994	Essendon	21	1	1	1	4	1	5	2	2	1.0	1.0	4.0	1.0	5.0	2.0	2.0
1995	Essendon	21	2	0	0	4	3	7	1	0	0.0	0.0	2.0	1.5	3.5	0.5	0.0
1996	Essendon	21	12	6	3	55	46	101	33	25	0.5	0.3	4.6	3.8	8.4	2.8	2.1
1997	Essendon	21	11	0	1	63	26	89	27	7	0.0	0.1	5.7	2.4	8.1	2.5	0.6
1998	Essendon	21	1	0	0	3	0	3	1	0	0.0	0.0	3.0	0.0	3.0	1.0	0.0
1999	Essendon	21	23	10	4	119	78	197	52	34	0.4	0.2	5.2	3.4	8.6	2.3	1.5
2000†	Essendon	21	16	3	1	79	57	136	54	18	0.2	0.1	4.9	3.6	8.5	3.4	1.1
2001	Essendon	21	1	0	0	0	0	0	0	1	0.0	0.0	0.0	0.0	0.0	0.0	1.0
Career			127	42	38	716	405	1121	336	198	0.3	0.3	5.6	3.2	8.8	2.6	1.6
