= 2000 AFL finals series =

Australian Football League playoffs

The 2000 AFL finals series took place between 11 August and 2 September in the 2000 AFL season. The eight clubs which participated were competing for the Australian Football League premiership. The Essendon Football Club would go through the series undefeated and claim their 16th premiership.

== Overview ==
Qualifying and elimination finals
1 | Essendon | 31.12 (198)
4 | Kangaroos | 11.7 (73)
5 | Geelong | 12.11 (83)
8 | Hawthorn | 14.8 (92)
6 | Brisbane Lions | 15.20 (110)
7 | Western Bulldogs | 10.16 (76)
2 | Carlton | 12.15 (87)
3 | Melbourne | 15.6 (96)

Semi-finals
Kangaroos | 16.14 (110)
Hawthorn | 15.10 (100)
Carlton | 23.13 (151)
Brisbane Lions | 10.9 (69)

Preliminary finals
Essendon | 18.17 (125)
Carlton | 12.8 (80)
Melbourne | 23.18 (156)
Kangaroos | 17.4 (106)

Grand final
Essendon | 19.21 (135)
Melbourne | 11.9 (75)

== Week One ==
=== Elimination finals ===
Friday, 11 August | Geelong | def. by | Hawthorn | Colonial Stadium (crowd: 44,709)
3.4; 6.5; 9.9; 12.11 (83) | Q1; Q2; Q3; Final | 4.2; 6.3; 11.5; 14.8 (92)
Bizzell, Mensch, Riccardi 2 Burns, Chapman, Hocking, Houlihan, Milburn, Spriggs 1 | Goals | Barker 4 Crawford, Dixon 2 Bowyer, Chick, Graham, Rock, Thompson, Woods 1

| Hawthorn Football Club | Geelong Football Club |
|---|---|
| John Barker | Clint Bizzell |
| Kris Barlow | Ronnie Burns |
| Glen Bowyer | Paul Chapman |
| Daniel Chick | David Clarke |
| Shane Crawford | Ben Graham |
| Trent Croad | Tom Harley |
| Ben Dixon | Garry Hocking |
| Mark Graham | Adam Houlihan |
| Daniel Harford | Glenn Kilpatrick |
| Jonathan Hay | Steven King |
| Nick Holland | Tim McGrath |
| Angelo Lekkas | David Mensch |
| Luke McCabe | Darren Milburn |
| Lance Picioane | Peter Riccardi |
| Jade Rawlings | Brenton Sanderson |
| Anthony Rock | Matthew Scarlett |
| Paul Salmon | Brad Sholl |
| Joel Smith | Jason Snell |
| Rayden Tallis | David Spriggs |
| Nathan Thompson | Carl Steinfort |
| Tony Woods | Barry Stoneham |
| Barry Young | David Wojcinski |

Saturday, 12 August | Brisbane Lions | def. | Western Bulldogs | Gabba (crowd: 25,925)
3.6.24; 7.10.52; 11.15.81; 15.20 (110) | Q1; Q2; Q3; Final | 3.3.21; 5.7.37; 7.13.55; 10.16 (76)
Lynch, Power 5 M. Voss 2 Akermanis, Molloy, B. Voss 1 | Goals | Grant 3 Cox 2 Bartlett, Hudson, Hunter, Mahoney, Smith 1

| Brisbane Lions | Western Bulldogs |
|---|---|
| Jason Akermanis | Trent Bartlett |
| Marcus Ashcroft | Nathan Brown |
| Simon Black | Adam Contessa |
| Craig Bolton | Simon Cox |
| Daniel Bradshaw | Matthew Croft |
| Jonathan Brown | Todd Curley |
| Shaun Hart | Luke Darcy |
| Des Headland | Nathan Eagleton |
| Chris Johnson | Simon Garlick |
| Trent Knobel | Chris Grant |
| Nigel Lappin | Paul Hudson |
| Steven Lawrence | Kingsley Hunter |
| Justin Leppitsch | Brad Johnson |
| Alastair Lynch | Steven Kolyniuk |
| Beau McDonald | Steven Kretiuk |
| Jarrod Molloy | Tony Liberatore |
| Luke Power | Josh Mahoney |
| Ben Robbins | Matthew Robbins |
| Chris Scott | Jose Romero |
| Brett Voss | Rohan Smith |
| Michael Voss | Scott West |
| Darryl White | Scott Wynd |

=== Qualifying finals ===
Saturday, 12 August | Essendon | def. | Kangaroos | MCG (crowd: 68,443)
9.1.55; 15.6.96; 25.9.159; 31.12 (198) | Q1; Q2; Q3; Final | 4.2.26; 6.3.39; 9.4.58; 11.7 (73)
Lloyd 7 Hird 5 Misiti 4 Moorcroft 3 Bewick, Caracella, Lucas 2 Alessio, Blumfield, Johnson, Long, Mercuri, Wellman 1 | Goals | King 7 Carey, Grant, Harvey, McKernan 1

| Essendon Football Club | Kangaroos |
|---|---|
| Steven Alessio | Winston Abraham |
| Paul Barnard | Glenn Archer |
| John Barnes | Peter Bell |
| Darren Bewick | John Blakey |
| Justin Blumfield | Matthew Burton |
| Blake Caracella | Matthew Capuano |
| Dustin Fletcher | Wayne Carey |
| Damien Hardwick | Brett Chandler |
| Chris Heffernan | Shane Clayton |
| James Hird | Stuart Cochrane |
| Jason Johnson | Leigh Colbert |
| Mark Johnson | Shannon Grant |
| Matthew Lloyd | Brent Harvey |
| Michael Long | David King |
| Scott Lucas | Troy Makepeace |
| Mark Mercuri | Mick Martyn |
| Joe Misiti | Jason McCartney |
| Gary Moorcroft | Corey McKernan |
| Adam Ramanauskas | Shannon Motlop |
| Dean Solomon | Byron Pickett |
| Dean Wallis | Adam Simpson |
| Sean Wellman | Anthony Stevens |

Sunday, 13 August | Carlton | def. by | Melbourne | MCG (crowd: 75,570)
4.4.28; 8.8.56; 10.14.74; 12.15 (87) | Q1; Q2; Q3; Final | 3.4.22; 6.4.40; 8.5.53; 15.6 (96)
Lappin, Whitnall 3 Brown, Hamill, Houlihan, Hulme, Porter, Ratten 1 | Goals | Green 4 Bruce, Powell, Schwarz 2 Leoncelli, McDonald, Neitz, Walsh, Yze 1

| Melbourne Football Club | Carlton Football Club |
|---|---|
| Cameron Bruce | Matthew Allan |
| Matthew Collins | Simon Beaumont |
| Jeff Farmer | Fraser Brown |
| Steven Febey | Scott Camporeale |
| Brad Green | Brendan Fevola |
| Brent Grgic | Simon Fletcher |
| Anthony Ingerson | Anthony Franchina |
| Travis Johnstone | Scott Freeborn |
| Andrew Leoncelli | Aaron Hamill |
| Anthony McDonald | Adrian Hickmott |
| David Neitz | Trent Hotton |
| Alistair Nicholson | Ryan Houlihan |
| Stephen Powell | Darren Hulme |
| Guy Rigoni | Matthew Lappin |
| Russell Robertson | Michael Mansfield |
| David Schwarz | Glenn Manton |
| Troy Simmonds | Andrew McKay |
| Peter Walsh | Mark Porter |
| Daniel Ward | Brett Ratten |
| Jeff White | Dean Rice |
| Shane Woewodin | Stephen Silvagni |
| Adem Yze | Lance Whitnall |

== Week Two ==
=== Semi-finals ===
Friday, 18 August | Kangaroos | def. | Hawthorn | MCG (crowd: 50,027)
6.1.37; 10.7.67; 12.11.83; 16.14 (110) | Q1; Q2; Q3; Final | 2.2.14; 5.3.33; 9.7.61; 15.10 (100)
Grant 4 Carey 3 Abraham 2 Bell, Burton, Capuano, Cochrane, McKernan, Pickett, Stevens 1 | Goals | Holland 3 Crawford, Croad, Thompson 2 Bowyer, Chick, Dixon, Hartford, Rawlings, Salmon 1

| Kangaroos | Hawthorn Football Club |
|---|---|
| Winston Abraham | John Barker |
| Glenn Archer | Glen Bowyer |
| Peter Bell | Daniel Chick |
| John Blakey | Shane Crawford |
| Matthew Burton | Trent Croad |
| Matthew Capuano | Ben Dixon |
| Wayne Carey | Mark Graham |
| Stuart Cochrane | Daniel Harford |
| Leigh Colbert | Jonathan Hay |
| Shannon Grant | Nick Holland |
| Brent Harvey | Brett Johnson |
| David King | Angelo Lekkas |
| Adam Lange | Luke McCabe |
| Troy Makepeace | Lance Picioane |
| Jason McCartney | Jade Rawlings |
| Corey McKernan | Anthony Rock |
| Shannon Motlop | Paul Salmon |
| Byron Pickett | Joel Smith |
| Martin Pike | Rayden Tallis |
| Craig Sholl | Nathan Thompson |
| Adam Simpson | Tony Woods |
| Anthony Stevens | Barry Young |

Saturday, 19 August | Carlton | def. | Brisbane Lions | MCG (crowd: 56,924)
3.3.21; 10.5.65; 18.9.117; 23.13 (151) | Q1; Q2; Q3; Final | 3.1.19; 4.4.28; 9.4.58; 10.9 (69)
Hamill 7 Fevola 4 Allan 3 Lappin, Whitnall 2 Bradley, Camporeale, Freeborn, Porter, Ratten 1 | Goals | Leppitsch 4 Akermanis, Lynch 2 Bolton, Lappin 1

| Carlton Football Club | Brisbane Lions |
|---|---|
| Matthew Allan | Jason Akermanis |
| Brett Backwell | Marcus Ashcroft |
| Simon Beaumont | Simon Black |
| Craig Bradley | Craig Bolton |
| Scott Camporeale | Jonathan Brown |
| Brendan Fevola | Damian Cupido |
| Simon Fletcher | Shaun Hart |
| Anthony Franchina | Des Headland |
| Scott Freeborn | Chris Johnson |
| Aaron Hamill | Trent Knobel |
| Adrian Hickmott | Nigel Lappin |
| Trent Hotton | Steven Lawrence |
| Ryan Houlihan | Justin Leppitsch |
| Darren Hulme | Alastair Lynch |
| Matthew Lappin | Beau McDonald |
| Michael Mansfield | Jarrod Molloy |
| Glenn Manton | Tim Notting |
| Andrew McKay | Marcus Picken |
| Mark Porter | Ben Robbins |
| Brett Ratten | Brett Voss |
| Stephen Silvagni | Michael Voss |
| Lance Whitnall | Darryl White |

== Week Three ==
=== Preliminary finals ===
Friday, 25 August | Kangaroos | def. by | Melbourne | MCG (crowd: 63,937)
5.1.31; 9.1.55; 10.4.64; 17.4 (106) | Q1; Q2; Q3; Final | 6.5.41; 14.10.94; 18.14.122; 23.18 (156)
Sholl 7 Carey 3 Archer, Bell 2 Abraham, King, McKernan 1 | Goals | Farmer 8 Powell 4 Robertson 3 Neitz 2 Green, Grgic, Schwarz, White, Woewodin, Yze 1

| Melbourne Football Club | Kangaroos |
|---|---|
| Cameron Bruce | Winston Abraham |
| Matthew Collins | Glenn Archer |
| Jeff Farmer | Peter Bell |
| Steven Febey | John Blakey |
| Brad Green | Matthew Burton |
| Brent Grgic | Matthew Capuano |
| Anthony Ingerson | Wayne Carey |
| Travis Johnstone | Shane Clayton |
| Andrew Leoncelli | Stuart Cochrane |
| Anthony McDonald | Leigh Colbert |
| David Neitz | Shannon Grant |
| Alistair Nicholson | Brent Harvey |
| Stephen Powell | David King |
| Guy Rigoni | Troy Makepeace |
| Russell Robertson | Mick Martyn |
| David Schwarz | Jason McCartney |
| Troy Simmonds | Corey McKernan |
| Peter Walsh | Byron Pickett |
| Daniel Ward | Martin Pike |
| Jeff White | Craig Sholl |
| Shane Woewodin | Adam Simpson |
| Adem Yze | Anthony Stevens |

Saturday, 26 August | Essendon | def. | Carlton | MCG (crowd: 84,778)
4.2.26; 8.7.55; 14.13.97; 18.17 (125) | Q1; Q2; Q3; Final | 2.3.15; 5.4.34; 6.7.43; 12.8 (80)
Lloyd 4 Mercuri 3 Blumfield, Caracella, Lucas 2 Alessio, Barnard, Hird, Long, Solomon 1 | Goals | Hickmott 3 Camporeale, Fevola 2 Allan, Bradley, Hamill, Hulme, Ratten 1

| Essendon Football Club | Carlton Football Club |
|---|---|
| Steven Alessio | Matthew Allan |
| Paul Barnard | Simon Beaumont |
| John Barnes | Craig Bradley |
| Darren Bewick | Fraser Brown |
| Justin Blumfield | Scott Camporeale |
| Blake Caracella | Brendan Fevola |
| Dustin Fletcher | Simon Fletcher |
| Damien Hardwick | Anthony Franchina |
| Chris Heffernan | Scott Freeborn |
| James Hird | Aaron Hamill |
| Jason Johnson | Adrian Hickmott |
| Mark Johnson | Trent Hotton |
| Matthew Lloyd | Ryan Houlihan |
| Michael Long | Darren Hulme |
| Scott Lucas | Matthew Lappin |
| Mark Mercuri | Michael Mansfield |
| Joe Misiti | Glenn Manton |
| Gary Moorcroft | Andrew McKay |
| Adam Ramanauskas | Mark Porter |
| Dean Solomon | Brett Ratten |
| Dean Wallis | Dean Rice |
| Sean Wellman | Lance Whitnall |

== Week Four ==
=== Grand final ===
| Home team | Score | Away team | Score | Venue | Attendance | Date |
|---|---|---|---|---|---|---|
| Essendon | 19.21 (135) | Melbourne | 11.9 (75) | MCG | 96,249 | Saturday, 2 September |
