= 2000 AFL Grand Final =

Grand final of the 2000 Australian Football League season

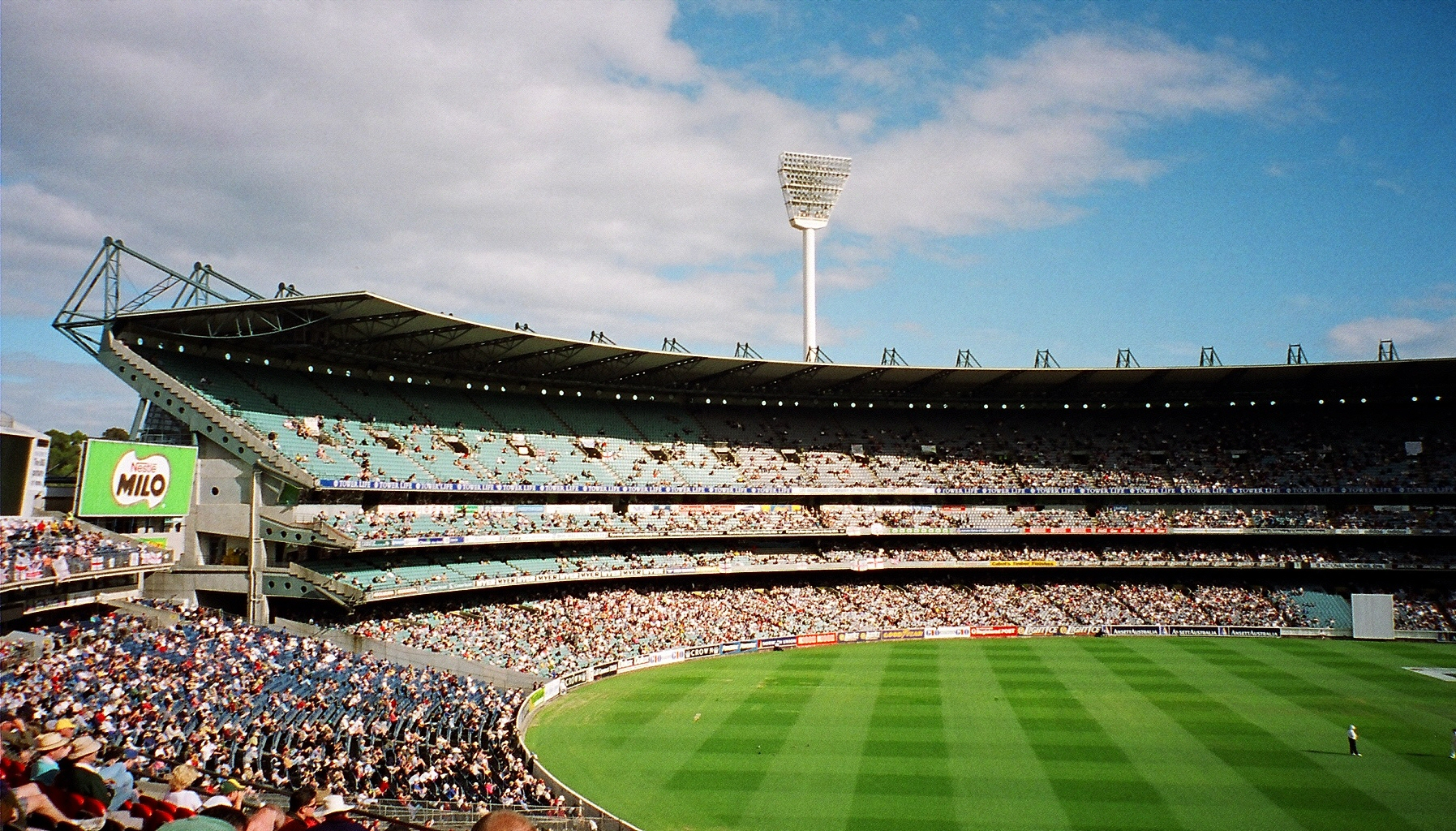
- The Melbourne Cricket Ground, where the 2000 AFL Grand Final took place

Essendon	Melbourne
19.21 (135)	11.9 (75)
	1	2	3	4
ESS	4.8 (32)	10.16 (76)	16.17 (113)	19.21 (135)
MEL	3.3 (21)	5.5 (35)	8.8 (56)	11.9 (75)
- Date: 2 September 2000
- Stadium: Melbourne Cricket Ground
- Attendance: 96,249
- Favourite: Essendon
- Umpires: Darren Goldspink (32), Brett Allen (10), Hayden Kennedy (7)
- Coin toss won by: David Neitz, Melbourne
- Kicked toward: City End

Ceremonies
- Pre-match entertainment: The Idea of North, Trish Delaney-Brown, Megan Corson, Andrew Piper and Nick Begie
- National anthem: Bachelor Girl
- Post-match entertainment: Mike Brady, Russell Morris and Rick Price

Accolades
- Norm Smith Medallist: James Hird (Essendon)
- Jock McHale Medallist: Kevin Sheedy (Essendon)

Broadcast in Australia
- Network: Seven Network
- Commentators: Bruce McAvaney (host and commentator); Sandy Roberts (commentator); Jason Dunstall (expert commentator); Gerard Healy (expert commentator); Malcolm Blight (expert commentator); Tony Lockett (boundary rider); Anthony Hudson (boundary rider); Robert DiPierdomenico (boundary rider)

The 2000 AFL Grand Final was an Australian rules football game contested between the Essendon Football Club and the Melbourne Football Club, held at the Melbourne Cricket Ground in Melbourne on 2 September 2000 rather than in its usual last Saturday of September date to avoid conflicting with the 2000 Summer Olympics in Sydney. It was the 104th annual grand final (counting replays) of the Australian Football League (formerly the Victorian Football League), staged to determine the premiers for the 2000 AFL season. The match, attended by 96,249 spectators, was won by Essendon by a margin of 60 points. It was Essendon's 16th premiership, drawing the club equal for the most VFL/AFL premierships. It remains as of 2026 Essendon's most recent victory in a grand final.

== Background ==
This was Essendon's first appearance in a grand final since winning the 1993 AFL Grand Final, whilst it was Melbourne's first since losing the 1988 VFL Grand Final by a then record margin of 96 points.

In the previous week's preliminary finals, Essendon defeated Carlton by 45 points, while Melbourne defeated North Melbourne by 50 points. The following Monday saw Melbourne's Shane Woewodin awarded the Brownlow Medal with 24 votes, ahead of Western Bulldogs midfielder Scott West and Adelaide midfielder Andrew McLeod.

Essendon won the most home-and-away games (21) and total games (24) in a single season in the history of the VFL/AFL, breaking the records set by Carlton in 1995 (20 and 23, respectively), and they broke Collingwood's 1929 record when it won its first twenty games; if the pre-season cup is included, Essendon won 30 games out of 31; all of these records still stand. In 2008, Geelong won 21 of 22 games in the home-and-away season to equal that record, but they lost the grand final. Essendon's grand final win was the last by a Victorian side until Geelong won in 2007.

== Match summary ==
Melbourne captain David Neitz won the toss and chose to kick towards the City/Members end of the MCG in the opening quarter. The first score of the game went to Melbourne. Neitz, from a very tight angle near the behind post on the Members side of the goals, kicked the ball into the far goal post resulting in one point.

It was only a short time after the first score of the game that James Hird kicked the first goal of the game for Essendon. Melbourne's first goal was kicked by Stephen Powell.

The Bombers never looked threatened from after quarter time and comfortably won its record-equaling 16th premiership by 60 points after arguably the most dominant season in VFL/AFL history.

One downside for the Bombers was an incident in which Melbourne's Troy Simmonds was hit high by Essendon's Michael Long, resulting in a 25-man brawl. Simmonds was taken from the field on a stretcher; nine players were reported on ten offences by the umpires. Whilst this incident may not have influenced the final result, it was indicative of the nature of football Kevin Sheedy had instilled in the team, as Brad Green also suffered a throat injury off the ball.

Hird was awarded the Norm Smith Medal for being judged the best player afield. Paul Barnard and Matthew Lloyd each kicked four goals for the Bombers.

Essendon's triumph would be the last by any Victorian team until the 2007 AFL Grand Final when Geelong won its first premiership in 44 years.

The National Anthem was sung by Tania Doko of Bachelor Girl.

== Teams ==
Essendon	Melbourne

Essendon
B:	1 Mark Johnson	31 Dustin Fletcher	6 Sean Wellman
HB:	11 Damien Hardwick	21 Dean Wallis	7 Dean Solomon
C:	26 Chris Heffernan	24 Joe Misiti	33 Blake Caracella
HF:	2 Mark Mercuri	25 Scott Lucas	5 James Hird (c)
F:	9 Adam Ramanauskas	18 Matthew Lloyd	13 Michael Long
Foll:	22 John Barnes	32 Justin Blumfield	14 Jason Johnson
Int:	8 Darren Bewick	16 Paul Barnard	27 Steven Alessio
Int:	29 Gary Moorcroft		
Coach:	Kevin Sheedy		

Melbourne
B:	26 Daniel Ward	27 Anthony Ingerson	44 Alistair Nicholson
HB:	42 Peter Walsh	28 Matthew Collins	21 Steven Febey
C:	13 Adem Yze	22 Shane Woewodin	35 Anthony McDonald
HF:	18 Brad Green	5 David Schwarz	7 Stephen Powell
F:	24 Russell Robertson	9 David Neitz (c)	33 Jeff Farmer
Foll:	34 Jeff White	43 Guy Rigoni	36 Andrew Leoncelli
Int:	4 Brent Grgic	16 Travis Johnstone	47 Ben Beams
Int:	46 Troy Simmonds		
Coach:	Neale Daniher		

== Scorecard ==
Essendon vs Melbourne
Team	Q1	Q2	Q3	Final
Essendon	4.8 (32)	10.16 (76)	16.17 (113)	19.21 (135)
Melbourne	3.3 (21)	5.5 (35)	8.8 (56)	11.9 (75)
Venue:		Melbourne Cricket Ground, Melbourne		
Date:		2 September 2000		
Attendance:		96,249		
Umpires:		Darren Goldspink (32), Brett Allen (10), Hayden Kennedy (7)		
Goal scorers:	Essendon	4: Paul Barnard, Matthew Lloyd. 3: Blake Caracella. 2: James Hird. 1: Gary Moorcroft, Mark Mercuri, Michael Long, Justin Blumfield, Darren Bewick, Steven Alessio		
Goal scorers:	Melbourne	3: Jeff Farmer, Stephen Powell. 2: David Neitz, Russell Robertson. 1: Brad Green		
Best:	Essendon	Hird, Barnes, Caracella, Misiti, Wallis		
Best:	Melbourne	White, Powell, Johnstone, Neitz, Walsh		
Reports:		Essendon: Wallis (striking), Long (rough play), Dustin Fletcher (striking) Melbourne: Brent Grgic (striking)		
Injuries:		Melbourne: Simmonds (concussion), Green (fractured larynx)		
Coin toss winner:		David Neitz, Melbourne		
Norm Smith Medal:		James Hird, Essendon		
Australian television broadcaster:		Seven Network		
National Anthem:		Bachelor Girl		

== See also ==
- 2000 AFL season
- 1948 VFL Grand Final
- 1957 VFL Grand Final

== Notes ==
- Main, Jim (2001). More than a century of AFL Grand Finals. Pennon Publishing. ISBN 1-877029-00-9.
