= 2005 VFL season =

124th season of the Victorian Football League

- Teams: 13
- Premiers: Sandringham; 9th premiership
- Minor premiers: Werribee; 4th minor premiership
- Leading goalkicker: James Podsiadly (Werribee)
- Matches played: 126

The 2005 Victorian Football League season was the 124th season of the Australian rules football competition. The premiership was won by the Sandringham Football Club, after it defeated Werribee in the Grand Final on 18 September by nine points; it was Sandringham's ninth top-division premiership, and the second of three premierships won consecutively by the club between 2004 and 2006.

== Ladder ==
2005 VFL season
Pos	Team	Pld	W	L	D	PF	PA	PP	Pts	
1	Werribee	18	15	3	0	2138	1590	134.5	60	Finals
2	Northern Bullants	18	13	4	1	1690	1343	125.8	54	Finals
3	Sandringham (P)	18	12	6	0	1793	1558	115.1	48	Finals
4	Bendigo	18	11	7	0	1816	1357	133.8	44	Finals
5	Port Melbourne	18	11	7	0	1747	1725	101.3	44	Finals
6	Tasmania	18	10	8	0	1724	1615	106.7	40	Finals
7	Frankston	18	8	9	1	1486	1440	103.2	34	Finals
8	Box Hill	18	7	11	0	1479	1632	90.6	28	Finals
9	Williamstown	18	7	11	0	1474	1713	86.0	28	
10	North Ballarat	18	7	11	0	1434	1756	81.7	28	
11	Springvale	18	6	12	0	1480	1565	94.6	24	
12	Coburg	18	5	13	0	1404	1774	79.1	20	
13	Geelong reserves	18	4	14	0	1478	2075	71.2	16	

Rules for classification: 1) points; 2) percentage; 3) number of points for.
(P) Premiers

== Finals Series ==
Qualifying and elimination finals
26 August, Queen Elizabeth Oval
1	Werribee	19.8 (122)
4	Bendigo	15.14 (104)
28 August, TEAC Oval
5	Port Melbourne	21.19 (145)
8	Box Hill	8.13 (61)
28 August, Bellerive Oval
6	Tasmania	17.19 (121)
7	Frankston	11.9 (75)
27 August, TEAC Oval
2	Northern Bullants	3.11 (29)
3	Sandringham	16.20 (116)

Semi-finals
3 September, TEAC Oval
Bendigo	20.6 (126)
Port Melbourne	13.10 (88)
4 September, Bellerive Oval
Northern Bullants	18.9 (117)
Tasmania	5.14 (44)

Preliminary finals
10 September, TEAC Oval
Werribee	15.15 (105)
Northern Bullants	11.10 (76)
11 September, TEAC Oval
Sandringham	17.19 (121)
Bendigo	12.10 (82)

Grand final
18 September, Optus Oval
Sandringham	11.17 (83)
Werribee	11.8 (74)

=== Grand Final ===
2005 VFL Grand Final
Sunday, 18 September (2:10pm)	Sandringham	def.	Werribee	Optus Oval (crowd: 9,000)
2.4 (16); 4.6 (30); 9.12 (66); 11.17 (83)	Q1; Q2; Q3; Final	3.1 (19); 4.6 (30); 5.7 (37); 11.8 (74)	Norm Goss Memorial Medal: Daniel Ward (Sandringham)
Armstrong 2, Motlop 2, Poyas 2, Gallagher, Heffernan, Johnson, Sautner, Williams	Goals	Podsiadly 3, Bandy 2, Birss 2, McCormack, O'Sullivan, Rawlings, Skipper

== Awards ==
- The Jim 'Frosty' Miller Medal was won by James Podsiadly (Werribee), who kicked 66 goals.
- The J. J. Liston Trophy was won jointly by Ian Callinan (Tasmania) and Paul Johnson (Sandringham), who each polled 16 votes. Callinan and Johnson finished ahead of Digby Morrell (Northern Bullants), who was third with 15 votes.
- The Fothergill–Round Medal was won by Jackson Barling (Williamstown).
- Williamstown won the reserves premiership. Williamstown 16.7 (103) defeated North Ballarat 12.9 (81) in the Grand Final, held as a curtain-raiser to the Seniors Grand Final on 18 September.

== See also ==
- List of VFA/VFL premiers
- Australian rules football
- Victorian Football League
- Australian Football League
- 2005 AFL season
