= Mark Porter (footballer) =

Australian rules footballer (born 1976)

Personal information
- Full name: Mark Porter
- Born: 11 October 1976 (age 50)
- Original teams: King Valley, Coburg
- Height: 199 cm (6 ft 6 in)
- Weight: 103 kg (227 lb)

Playing career^{1}
Years	Club	Games (Goals)
1997–2001	Carlton	55 (13)
2002–2004	Kangaroos	55 (7)
Total		110 (20)
- ^{1} Playing statistics correct to the end of 2004.

Career highlights
- Fothergill–Round–Mitchell Medal: 1995

Mark Porter (born 11 October 1976) is a former Australian rules footballer who played with Carlton and the Kangaroos in the Australian Football League (AFL).

Originally from North Eastern Victoria, Porter began his senior career as a teenager in the Ovens & King Football League, playing originally for King Valley Thirds, winning their best and fairest in 1992. In 1994, at the age of just seventeen, and while playing for King Valley seniors as a ruckman, Porter won his club best and fairest and also won the Baker Medal as the league's senior best and fairest. In 1995, Porter moved to Melbourne, and was recruited to the VFA by the Coburg Football Club. In his first season with the Lions, he won the Fothergill–Round Medal as the league's most promising young talent. Porter played two seasons for Coburg.

After the 1996 season, Porter was recruited to the AFL as a rookie by the Carlton Football Club, which was looking for another ruckman with the emerging retirement of Justin Madden. Porter was the first player Carlton had recruited under the newly established rookie list. He made his AFL debut late in the 1997 season after Madden's mid-year retirement, and got regular games in 1998 as the second ruckman to Matthew Allan.

Porter suffered a knee injury in a practice match prior to the 1999 AFL season, which saw him miss the entire season. He returned to the team in late 2000 and took part in their finals campaign. In 2001 he was a regular selection as Carlton's first choice ruckman, due to an injury to Allan, and he performed admirably, finishing seventh in the league for hit-outs with 381.

After 2001, Carlton sought to improve its forward-line, and Porter was traded to the Kangaroos along with first and second round draft picks (#14 and #30 overall), in exchange for key forward Corey McKernan and second and third round draft picks (#23 and #39 overall). Porter played all but two games in 2002, alternating with Matthew Burton in the ruck and added another 19 games in 2003. Porter was delisted by the Kangaroos at the end of the 2004 season.

In 2005, Porter played with North Ballarat in the VFL. In 2006 he moved back to northern Victoria, and played for Benalla in the Goulburn Valley Football Netball League., playing there until 2007, before retiring.
