= Anthony McDonald =

Anthony McDonald may refer to:

- Anthony McDonald (Australian footballer) (born 1972), Australian rules footballer (Melbourne FC)
- Anthony McDonald (Scottish footballer) (born 2001), Scottish footballer (Heart of Midlothian FC)
- Anthony McDonald-Tipungwuti (born 1993), Australian rules footballer (Essendon FC)
