= Ingerson =

Ingerson is a surname. Notable people with the surname include:

- Anthony Ingerson (born 1969), Australian rules footballer
- Graham Ingerson (born 1941), Australian politician and Deputy premier of South Australia from 1996 to 1998
