= Troy Simmonds =

Australian rules footballer

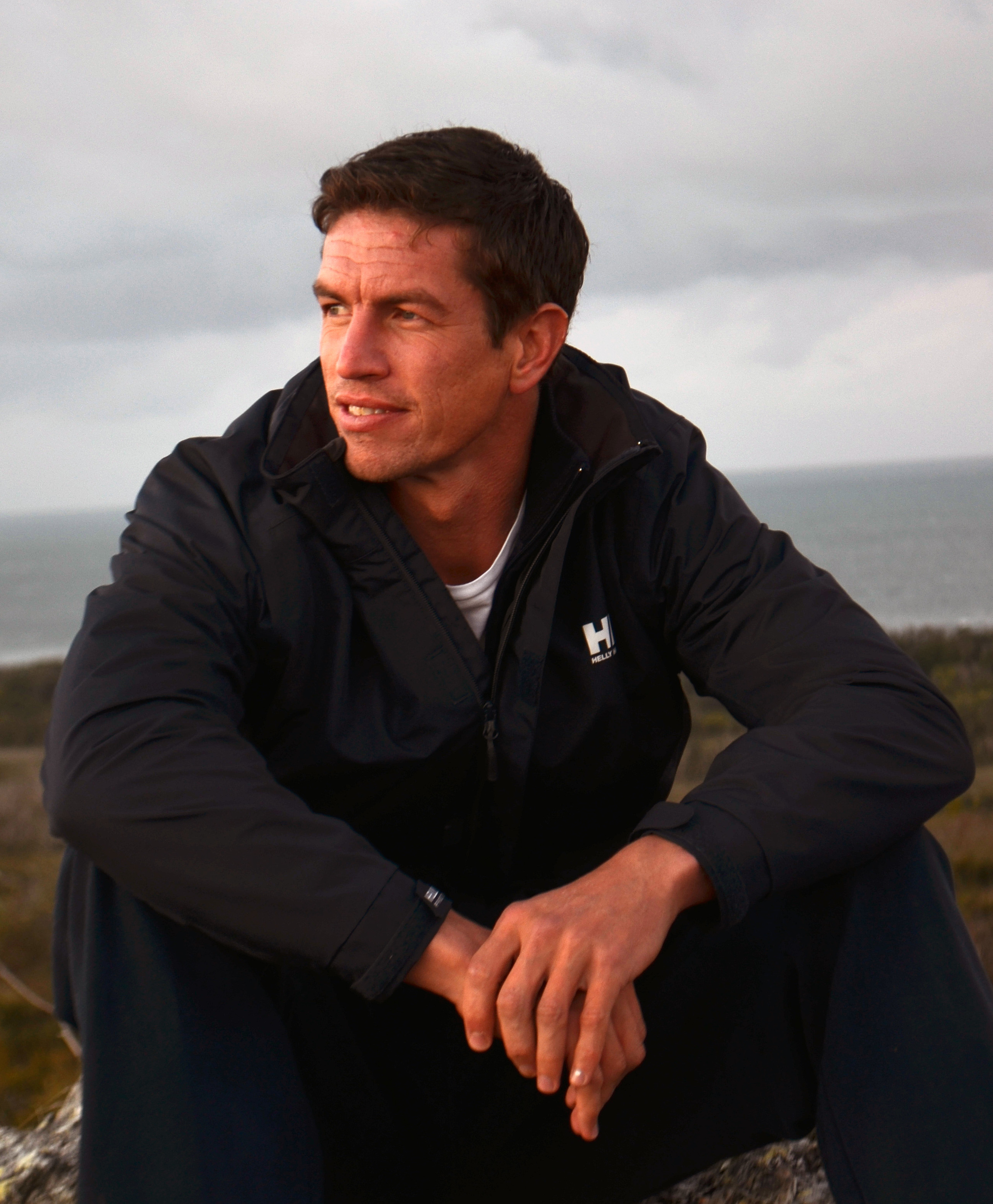
- Simmonds in May 2011

Personal information
- Full name: Troy Simmonds
- Born: 13 July 1978 (age 48); Melbourne, Australia
- Original team: Box Hill (VFL)
- Draft: No. 9, 1999 pre-season draft: Melbourne
- Height: 197 cm (6 ft 6 in)
- Weight: 99 kg (218 lb)
- Position: Ruck / forward

Playing career^{1}
Years	Club	Games (Goals)
1999 – 2001	Melbourne	40 (7)
2002 – 2004	Fremantle	64 (59)
2005 – 2010	Richmond	93 (66)
Total		197 (132)

Representative team honours
Years	Team	Games (Goals)
2008	(Victoria (state)) Victoria	1 (0)
- ^{1} Playing statistics correct to the end of 2010.

Career highlights
- AFL Grand Final appearance: 2000

Troy Simmonds (born 13 July 1978) is a former Australian rules footballer who played for Melbourne, Fremantle and Richmond in the Australian Football League.

== AFL career ==
=== Melbourne: 1999 – 2001 ===
Simmonds was first drafted by Melbourne in the 1999 pre-season draft. He played only five 5 games in 1999 but then played 22 in 2000, including the Grand Final, during which he was carried from the field on a stretcher following a head-on charge by Essendon's Michael Long.

=== Fremantle: 2002 – 2004 ===
In 2002 he was traded to Fremantle as part of a three way trade that included Daniel Bandy moving to the Western Bulldogs and Craig Ellis moving to Melbourne. This was seen as a chance for Simmonds to become Fremantle's main ruckman, as opposed to being Jeff White's understudy at Melbourne. In three seasons at Fremantle Simmonds played in 64 out of a possible 67 games, including Fremantle's first ever finals game in 2003.

=== Richmond: 2005 – 2010 ===
At the end of the 2004 season, Simmonds was traded back to Victoria, again in a three-way deal, with Heath Black returning to Fremantle, Aaron Fiora moving to St Kilda and Simmonds moving to Richmond. In a move surprising to many, Simmonds signed a five-year deal with the Tigers, as opposed to the usual two or three-year contracts. After a serviceable first year with Richmond, Simmonds played some of the best football of his career in 2006 - taking several big marks and scoring several goals up forward. At the end of 2009 Simmonds signed a one-year contract for the 2010 season. Prior to Round 10, 2010, Simmonds announced his retirement.
