= Darren Hulme =

Australian rules footballer

Personal information
- Born: 19 July 1977 (age 49)
- Original team: Dandenong Stingrays
- Height: 175 cm (5 ft 9 in)
- Weight: 77 kg (170 lb)

Playing career^{1}
Years	Club	Games (Goals)
1997–2004	Carlton	110 (56)
- ^{1} Playing statistics correct to the end of 2004.

Career highlights
- AFL Rising Star nominee: 1998

Darren Hulme (born 19 July 1977) is a former Australian rules footballer who played with Carlton.

Hulme played junior football for the Frankston Bombers, and the Dandenong Stingrays in the TAC Cup. He was recruited to the AFL with the 8th selection in the 1997 AFL Preseason Draft. Very small in stature, but tough and hard at the ball, Hulme played primarily as a midfielder and/or tagger with stints in the forward-line. His kicking was the biggest deficiency in his game, but this improved as his career progressed. When he arrived at the club, both his playing style and his hairstyle were similar to that of ten-year veteran Fraser Brown; Brown's nickname had been "Dog", and Hulme accordingly received the nickname "Pup", which stayed with him throughout his time at Carlton.

Hulme played eight games in his debut season. He went on to be a solid contributor for Carlton over a career spanning eight years, including a fifth-placing in the 2003 Best and Fairest, and tying with Craig Bradley and Adrian Hickmott for the Peter Sullivan Memorial Trophy (most votes in the Brownlow Medal by a Carlton player) in 2001. His career was plagued by injury: a quadriceps injury ruled him out of the 1999 finals series, a knee injury meant he could only play the first 3 games of 2002 and he missed the second half of the 2004 season with a groin injury. He was delisted at the end of 2004.

Since being delisted, Hulme has continued to play state and local football for a wide range of teams: Mansfield (GVFL) in 2005; Karingal (MPNFL Peninsula Division) in 2006 and 2007; Clayton (SFL) as playing coach in 2008; Bendigo (VFL), as playing assistant coach in 2009; a return to Karingal in 2010, and then back to his junior team, Frankston Bombers (MPNFL Nepean Division) in 2011 and 2012.

== Sources ==
- Holmesby, Russell & Main, Jim (2007). The Encyclopedia of AFL Footballers. 7th ed. Melbourne: Bas Publishing.
