= Simon Fletcher (Australian footballer) =

Australian rules footballer

Personal information
- Full name: Simon Fletcher
- Born: 17 August 1978 (age 48)
- Original team: Geelong Falcons
- Draft: Father/Son, 1995 AFL draft
- Height: 188 cm (6 ft 2 in)
- Weight: 86 kg (190 lb)

Playing career^{1}
Years	Club	Games (Goals)
1996–1997	Geelong	0 (0)
1999–2003	Carlton	84 (30)
2004	Richmond	6 (0)
Total		90 (30)
- ^{1} Playing statistics correct to the end of 2004.

Simon Fletcher (born 17 August 1978) is a former Australian rules footballer who played with Carlton and Richmond in the Australian Football League (AFL).

Fletcher was initially drafted to Geelong, from the Falcons, under the father–son rule. His father Gary did not play at VFL/AFL level but the rule was used because he was a manager at the club. A knee injury in 1997 kept him out of action and he was delisted at the end of the season.

Carlton rookie listed Fletcher in 1998 and he made his senior debut late in the 1999 AFL season. He impressed enough to keep his spot for the finals series and made three appearances, but after having just five disposals in the preliminary final was replaced by Adrian Hickmott for the grand final.

Fletcher, who played mostly on the wing and flanks, missed just one game in 2000 and played in another preliminary final. A former Grovedale player, he was again a regular member of the team in 2001 and put together a sequence of 28 consecutive games before it ended in 2002.

He was delisted after the 2003 season and nominated for the national draft, where he was selected by Richmond with the 79th selection. He was unable to have an impact from six games, and was delisted. He continued his playing career in the Geelong Football League with St Mary's, playing there from 2005 until 2009.

After the 2009 season, Fletcher took the role as player development manager for the newly formed Gold Coast Football Club; he remains in the role as of 2013. He also played football with Burleigh in the AFL Queensland State League for a couple of years.

Simon is now a facilitator at Leading Teams.
