= Alistair Nicholson =

Australian rules footballer, born 1978

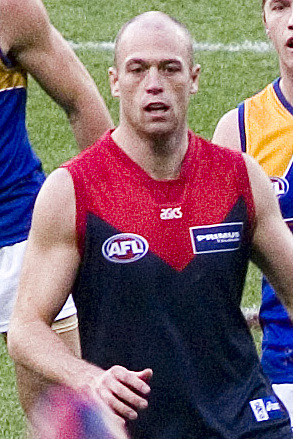
- Nicholson with Melbourne in 2005

Personal information
- Full name: Alistair Nicholson
- Nickname: Big Jack
- Born: 4 March 1978 (age 48)
- Original team: Claremont (WAFL)
- Draft: 22nd overall, 1996 National Draft
- Height: 197 cm (6 ft 6 in)
- Weight: 102 kg (225 lb)
- Position: Defender

Playing career^{1}
Years	Club	Games (Goals)
1997–2006	Melbourne	110 (3)
- ^{1} Playing statistics correct to the end of 2006.

Career highlights
- 2000 AFL Grand Final runner-up

Alistair "Big Jack" Nicholson (born 4 March 1978) is a former Australian rules footballer, who played with the Melbourne Football Club in the Australian Football League (AFL).

Nicholson was schooled at Scotch College, Perth, where he was school captain in his final year of 1995. He was also co-captain of the school's hockey team. Fellow AFL footballer Rowan Jones followed Nicholson as school captain in 1996.

Making his debut in 1997 in the number 44 guernsey, the large figure of the man known as "Big Jack" was a strong presence in defence for the Demons. Nicholson, a specialist key position defender, was most suited to full-back and was much maligned during his career, described by critics as "old, slow and useless" and "unfashionable". However, Nicholson was shown a lot of faith by coach Neale Daniher, and was signed on until the end of the 2007 season.

The next year, however, saw a sharp decline in Nicholson's career. Due to the emergence of much-improved fullback Nathan Carroll, Nicholson was relegated to the Sandringham Zebras, Melbourne's VFL affiliate, for the entirety of the 2006 season. At the end of the year, he was delisted and his contract was paid out (which still had a year to run), effectively ending his AFL career.

During his time with Melbourne he served on the AFL Players' Association executive committee and began working with Gemba, a sports consulting firm. After his retirement from the AFL he continued with Gemba, working up to the position of head of entertainment strategy. In September 2014 Nicholson was announced as the new chief executive officer of the Australian Cricketers' Association. In March 2021 he was announced as the new chief executive officer of the AFL's Coaches Association.

== Playing statistics ==
Legend
G	Goals	K	Kicks	D	Disposals	T	Tackles
B	Behinds	H	Handballs	M	Marks	H/O	Hit-outs

Season	Team	No.	Games	Totals								Averages (per game)							
Season	Team	No.	Games	G	B	K	H	D	M	T	H/O	G	B	K	H	D	M	T	H/O
1997	Melbourne	44	1	0	0	2	2	4	2	0	0	0.0	0.0	2.0	2.0	4.0	2.0	0.0	0.0
1998	Melbourne	44	0	—	—	—	—	—	—	—	—	—	—	—	—	—	—	—	—
1999	Melbourne	44	13	0	0	22	31	53	17	5	107	0.0	0.0	1.7	2.4	4.1	1.3	0.4	8.2
2000	Melbourne	44	16	0	0	52	81	133	45	21	34	0.0	0.0	3.3	5.1	8.3	2.8	1.3	2.1
2001	Melbourne	8	22	1	0	76	116	192	65	24	45	0.0	0.0	3.5	5.3	8.7	3.0	1.1	2.0
2002	Melbourne	8	11	2	1	41	38	79	40	13	7	0.2	0.1	3.7	3.5	7.2	3.6	1.2	0.6
2003	Melbourne	8	10	0	0	35	37	72	30	10	3	0.0	0.0	3.5	3.7	7.2	3.0	1.0	0.3
2004	Melbourne	8	23	0	0	81	98	179	60	25	4	0.0	0.0	3.5	4.3	7.8	2.6	1.1	0.2
2005	Melbourne	8	14	0	0	47	43	90	36	19	4	0.0	0.0	3.4	3.1	6.4	2.6	1.4	0.3
2006	Melbourne	8	0	—	—	—	—	—	—	—	—	—	—	—	—	—	—	—	—
Career			110	3	1	356	446	802	295	117	204	0.0	0.0	3.2	4.1	7.3	2.7	1.1	1.9
