= Peter Walsh (footballer) =

Australian rules footballer

Personal information
- Full name: Peter Walsh
- Born: 24 July 1976 (age 50)
- Original teams: Kyneton, West Adelaide
- Height: 180 cm (5 ft 11 in)
- Weight: 82 kg (181 lb)
- Position: Half back flank

Playing career^{1}
Years	Club	Games (Goals)
1999–2004	Melbourne	104 (31)
2005–2006	Port Adelaide	35 (6)
Total		139 (37)
- ^{1} Playing statistics correct to the end of 2006.

Career highlights
- Harold Ball Memorial Trophy: 1999

Peter Walsh (born 24 July 1976) is a former Australian rules footballer who played for Melbourne and Port Adelaide in the Australian Football League (AFL).

After two years at West Adelaide, Walsh made it on Melbourne's rookie list and was runner-up in the 1998 Gardiner Medal with good performances in the reserves. He made his league debut in 1999 and was a regular in the team throughout the year. The following season he missed just one game and had 20 disposals from a half back flank in the 2000 AFL Grand Final loss to Essendon. His best football was played in 2001 and he polled 11 votes at the Brownlow Medal to finish as the top placed Melbourne player, with three best on grounds.

Melbourne traded him to Port Adelaide in the 2004 AFL draft, gaining pick 43 as a result, which they used to recruit Michael Newton. In his first season, he played 23 games, including two finals. He struggled with injury in 2006 and at the end of the season was delisted by Port Adelaide who were pushing for youth. He continued playing in the SANFL with his former club, West Adelaide.
