= Scott Lucas (footballer) =

Australian rules footballer (born 1977)

Personal information
- Born: 30 December 1977 (age 48)
- Original team: Geelong Falcons
- Draft: No. 4, 1994 National Draft
- Debut: Round 5, 25 April 1996, Essendon vs. Collingwood, at Melbourne Cricket Ground
- Height: 192 cm (6 ft 4 in)
- Weight: 97 kg (214 lb)

Playing career^{1}
Years	Club	Games (Goals)
1996–2009	Essendon	270 (471)
- ^{1} Playing statistics correct to the end of 2009.

Career highlights
- Essendon premiership side 2000; Essendon Best and Fairest 2003, 2006; Essendon leading goalkicker 2006

Scott Lucas (born 30 December 1977) is a former Australian rules footballer for the Essendon Football Club in the Australian Football League, and he is noted as being the other major forward for the Bombers along with Matthew Lloyd during Essedon's turn-of-the-century domination. Together, Lloyd and Lucas were affectionately dubbed the "twin towers" due to their height in the Bomber forward line.

== Football career ==
Lucas is known for his strong marking and being a powerful, accurate left-foot kick, although his apparent inability to kick with his right foot is almost as notable. Lucas once joked on The Sunday Footy Show in 2006 that the last time he kicked with his right foot was to Gary Moorcroft when he took the famous 2001 Mark of the Year, considered by many to be the greatest AFL mark of all time.

Lucas mainly played across half-forward or centre half-forward, but he also played at centre half-back and full-forward. Lucas regularly had shots on goal from outside 60 metres with his booming left foot, and he rarely handballed, averaging 3.09 handballs a game (although it was actually slightly more than Lloyd's career average of 3.01). Nevertheless, Lucas's kick-to-handball ratio was 3.88, whereas Lloyd's was 3.34.

In Round 19, 2005, Lucas played his 200th AFL game and kicked his 300th AFL goal against Sydney at Telstra Dome, but the milestones would be remembered for all the wrong reasons, as the Bombers lost by 20 points despite leading at every change.

In 2006, Lucas had an outstanding year in an underachieving Essendon side, playing at full-forward and being their main target and goalkicker in the absence of captain Matthew Lloyd. Lucas finished the season with a career-best 67 goals and polled a joint team-high seven votes from just 36 votes received by Essendon players in the 2006 Brownlow Medal. Lucas was one of just three players who played every match for season 2006. He capped off this season with his second Crichton Medal, winning with 239 votes from Jobe Watson's 221. Lucas had previously won the club trophy in 2003, when the honours were shared with club legend James Hird.

Against West Coast in Round 11, 2007, Lucas booted his 400th career goal.

A vintage display also came against West Coast in Round 22 when, despite being close to 50 points down, Lucas rallied in the last quarter in a remarkable solo effort, booting 7 goals (and just missing for a record-equalling eighth), reducing the margin to just 2 points. In the end, though, a late goal to the Eagles saw a gallant Essendon fall 8 points short of one of the greatest-ever AFL comebacks. This was also the last game of James Hird and coach of 27 years, Kevin Sheedy.

During a match against the Western Bulldogs in the 2008 NAB Cup, Lucas managed to kick a record 3 Super Goals, which took his career tally to 7, making him the leading super-goal-kicker in the AFL.

Lucas suffered a knee injury (specifically, a torn cartilage) in the first round of the 2008 season against North Melbourne and was out of action for a number of weeks. Along with teammate Dustin Fletcher, Lucas signed a one-year contract in mid-2008. He bounced back to play in the second half of the season and kicked an amazing midair soccer goal against Richmond late in the season.

On 18 August 2009, Lucas announced his immediate retirement from football.

In 2013, Lucas was inducted into the Essendon Football Club Hall of Fame. He has also acted as a player manager for ex-teammate David Zaharakis.

== Playing statistics ==
Legend
G	Goals	K	Kicks	D	Disposals	T	Tackles
B	Behinds	H	Handballs	M	Marks

Season	Team	No.	Games	Totals							Averages (per game)						
Season	Team	No.	Games	G	B	K	H	D	M	T	G	B	K	H	D	M	T
1996	Essendon	25	14	11	11	84	49	133	44	19	0.8	0.8	6.0	3.5	9.5	3.1	1.4
1997	Essendon	25	22	23	11	241	85	326	123	24	1.0	0.5	11.0	3.9	14.8	5.6	1.1
1998	Essendon	25	23	49	31	287	51	338	123	30	2.1	1.3	12.5	2.2	14.7	5.3	1.3
1999	Essendon	25	10	8	9	106	27	133	45	12	0.8	0.9	10.6	2.7	13.3	4.5	1.2
2000	Essendon	25	23	57	42	265	84	349	132	38	2.5	1.8	11.5	3.7	15.2	5.7	1.7
2001	Essendon	25	25	35	34	297	76	373	135	42	1.4	1.4	11.9	3.0	14.9	5.4	1.7
2002	Essendon	25	19	25	15	235	60	295	108	33	1.3	0.8	12.4	3.2	15.5	5.7	1.7
2003	Essendon	25	24	19	16	334	83	417	130	61	0.8	0.7	13.9	3.5	17.4	5.4	2.5
2004	Essendon	25	21	25	21	275	69	344	108	53	1.2	1.0	13.1	3.3	16.4	5.1	2.5
2005	Essendon	25	22	51	24	289	48	337	134	49	2.3	1.1	13.1	2.2	15.3	6.1	2.2
2006	Essendon	25	22	67	44	310	58	368	183	33	3.0	2.0	14.1	2.6	16.7	8.3	1.5
2007	Essendon	25	22	61	28	292	66	358	159	31	2.8	1.3	13.3	3.0	16.3	7.2	1.4
2008	Essendon	25	9	18	9	53	17	70	36	12	2.0	1.0	5.9	1.9	7.8	4.0	1.3
2009	Essendon	25	14	22	14	133	62	195	90	33	1.6	1.0	9.5	4.4	13.9	6.4	2.4
Career			270	471	309	3201	835	4036	1550	470	1.7	1.1	11.9	3.1	14.9	5.7	1.7

== Personal life ==
On 4 January 2002, Lucas married Georgina Short. They have 3 daughters, Hannah, Mia & Meg. The youngest daughter Meg is on the women’s basketball team at the University at Buffalo in Buffalo, NY. He currently is the head coach of VSquad Junior Football Academy.
