= Justin Blumfield =

Australian rules footballer

Personal information
- Full name: Justin Blumfield
- Born: 24 November 1977 (age 48)
- Original team: Tuggeranong
- Draft: 62nd overall, 1994 AFL draft
- Height: 188 cm (6 ft 2 in)
- Weight: 86 kg (190 lb)
- Position: Midfielder

Playing career^{1}
Years	Club	Games (Goals)
1996–2002	Essendon	129 (86)
2003–2004	Richmond	19 (5)
Total		148 (91)

International team honours^{2}
Years	Team	Games (Goals)
2000	Australia	? (?)
- ^{1} Playing statistics correct to the end of 2004.^{2} Representative statistics correct as of 2000.

Career highlights
- Premiership player, 2000

Justin Blumfield (born 24 November 1977) is a former Australian rules football player of the Essendon and the Richmond Football Clubs in the Australian Football League (AFL).

His AFL career began in 1996 when he debuted for the Essendon Bombers. He was one of Essendon's consistent players in the years 1999, 2000, 2001 and 2002. Blumfield was a member of the Essendon 2000 premiership team, which defeated Melbourne in the 2000 AFL Grand Final and won a record 24 out of 25 games for the season.

At the end of 2002, he was traded to the Richmond Tigers to help Essendon meet the total player payments limit. He played 19 games over two seasons before he was delisted by them at the end of season 2004. Blumfield returned to be a playing assistant coach for Essendon's affiliated club in the Victorian Football League, the Bendigo Bombers. He was made a life member of Essendon on 15 December 2010.

After retiring from football he moved to Newcastle, New South Wales, to study for a Master of Business and Administration degree. In 2010, he joined the Cardiff Hawks in the Black Diamond Australian Football League. He is the nephew of former South Melbourne player Max Blumfield. Blumfield has since gone on to be the DFO general manager.

== Playing statistics ==
Legend
G	Goals	K	Kicks	D	Disposals	T	Tackles
B	Behinds	H	Handballs	M	Marks

Season	Team	No.	Games	Totals							Averages (per game)						
Season	Team	No.	Games	G	B	K	H	D	M	T	G	B	K	H	D	M	T
1996	Essendon	34	10	3	4	66	51	117	34	18	0.3	0.4	6.6	5.1	11.7	3.4	1.8
1997	Essendon	32	15	5	6	104	86	190	54	15	0.3	0.4	6.9	5.7	12.7	3.6	1.0
1998	Essendon	32	21	12	9	197	162	359	108	32	0.6	0.4	9.4	7.7	17.1	5.1	1.5
1999	Essendon	32	24	20	15	221	171	392	90	32	0.8	0.6	9.2	7.1	16.3	3.8	1.3
2000	Essendon	32	24	27	20	228	205	433	121	49	1.1	0.8	9.5	8.5	18.0	5.0	2.0
2001	Essendon	32	13	8	5	94	71	165	52	27	0.6	0.4	7.2	5.5	12.7	4.0	2.1
2002	Essendon	32	22	11	9	214	147	361	108	62	0.5	0.4	9.7	6.7	16.4	4.9	2.8
2003	Richmond	13	11	3	0	57	49	106	29	13	0.3	0.0	5.2	4.5	9.6	2.6	1.2
2004	Richmond	13	8	2	1	30	38	68	20	6	0.3	0.1	3.8	4.8	8.5	2.5	0.8
Career			148	91	69	1211	980	2191	616	254	0.6	0.5	8.2	6.6	14.8	4.2	1.7
