= Sean Wellman =

Australian rules footballer

Personal information
- Full name: Sean Wellman
- Born: 20 September 1974 (age 52); Adelaide, South Australia
- Original team: North Adelaide (SANFL)
- Height: 193 cm (6 ft 4 in)
- Weight: 90 kg (198 lb)
- Position: Defender

Playing career^{1}
Years	Club	Games (Goals)
1994–1995	Adelaide	34 (9)
1996–2004	Essendon	178 (25)
Total		212 (34)

Representative team honours^{2}
Years	Team	Games (Goals)
1995, 1997–1999	South Australia	4 (0)

International team honours^{2}
1998	Australia	2 (0)
- ^{1} Playing statistics correct to the end of 2004.^{2} Representative statistics correct as of 1998.

Career highlights
- AFL premiership player: 2000; 2× All-Australian team: 1998, 2001; AFL Rising Star nominee: 1994

Sean Wellman (born 20 September 1974) is a former Australian rules footballer who played for the Adelaide Football Club and Essendon Football Club in the Australian Football League (AFL).

Wellman was a key-position player who arrived at the AFL's Adelaide Football Club from North Adelaide. He played 34 games across his first two seasons in 1994 and 1995, before moving to Essendon in 1996. He became a key defender for the club and was often called "Not a well man" as a play on his surname by commentator Rex Hunt.

He played 212 games and kicked 34 goals, playing mainly as a center-half-back. He was a member of Essendon's premiership side in 2000, he played in every game of the season, and was a member of their losing grand final team in 2001. He received All-Australian selection in 1998 and 2001 and International rules representation in 1998. He retired from the AFL at the end of 2004. Since his retirement he has spent time at Melbourne and at the Western Bulldogs as an assistant coach. He returned to Essendon as an Assistant coach for the 2011 season.

== Statistics ==
Legend
G	Goals	K	Kicks	D	Disposals	T	Tackles
B	Behinds	H	Handballs	M	Marks

Season	Team	No.	Games	Totals							Averages (per game)						
Season	Team	No.	Games	G	B	K	H	D	M	T	G	B	K	H	D	M	T
1994	Adelaide	44	17	5	3	114	75	189	50	17	0.3	0.2	6.7	4.4	11.1	2.9	1.0
1995	Adelaide	44	17	4	3	122	54	176	45	10	0.2	0.2	7.2	3.2	10.4	2.6	0.6
1996	Essendon	6	9	0	0	59	37	96	28	4	0.0	0.0	6.6	4.1	10.7	3.1	0.4
1997	Essendon	6	22	2	2	208	81	289	100	17	0.1	0.1	9.5	3.7	13.1	4.5	0.8
1998	Essendon	6	23	2	3	248	111	359	122	15	0.1	0.1	10.8	4.8	15.6	5.3	0.7
1999	Essendon	6	22	1	0	259	90	349	94	15	0.0	0.0	11.8	4.1	15.9	4.3	0.7
2000	Essendon	6	25	5	1	231	127	358	100	25	0.2	0.0	9.2	5.1	14.3	4.0	1.0
2001	Essendon	6	23	10	4	266	122	388	125	33	0.4	0.2	11.6	5.3	16.9	5.4	1.4
2002	Essendon	6	22	3	4	243	99	342	128	29	0.1	0.2	11.0	4.5	15.5	5.8	1.3
2003	Essendon	6	20	2	3	201	106	307	89	31	0.1	0.2	10.1	5.3	15.4	4.5	1.6
2004	Essendon	6	12	0	0	100	46	146	63	17	0.0	0.0	8.3	3.8	12.2	5.3	1.4
Career			212	34	23	2051	948	2999	944	213	0.2	0.1	9.7	4.5	14.1	4.5	1.0
