= Darren Bewick =

Australian rules footballer

Personal information
- Full name: Darren Robert Bewick
- Nickname: Boris
- Born: 21 August 1967 (age 59); Perth, Western Australia
- Original team: West Perth (WAFL)
- Debut: 1988, Essendon vs. North Melbourne, at Windy Hill

Playing career^{1}
Years	Club	Games (Goals)
1985-1987	West Perth	52 (85)
1988–2000	Essendon	238 (332)
Total		290 (417)

Representative team honours
Years	Team	Games (Goals)
1986–1993	Western Australia	6 (7)
- ^{1} Playing statistics correct to the end of 2000.

Career highlights
- Essendon premiership team 1993, 2000

Darren Robert Bewick (born 21 August 1967) is a former Australian rules footballer who won two premierships with the Essendon Football Club in the Australian Football League (AFL). Bewick's game breaking pace & goal sense inside the attacking 50 was legendary amongst Bomber fans.

After debuting in 1988, Bewick played in all three of Essendon's finals in 1989. In 1990, Bewick played in Essendon's losing Grand Final team against Collingwood.

In the Preliminary Final of 1993, Bewick was instrumental in Essendon's comeback victory (trailing the Adelaide Crows by 42 points at half-time) to earn a place in the 1993 AFL Grand Final. Bewick kicked a game high 6 goals (equal with that of Adelaide full forward Tony Modra), kicking his 5th & 6th goals in the final term to level the scores, with Gary O'Donnell kicking truly to put Essendon in front. Essendon went on to defeat Adelaide by 11 points, with the sealer kicked by returning Essendon great, Tim Watson. The win secured Essendon a place in the 1993 AFL Grand Final against Carlton. Essendon dominated the premiership decider, winning by 44 points.

In the round 11 match against Geelong in 1995, Bewick ruptured his anterior cruciate ligament in an incident during the second quarter, ending his season. He played his comeback match (and 150th AFL game) against Geelong in the centenary re-enactment match at the MCG in round 7, 1996. In a best-on-ground display, Bewick kicked nine goals from 11 kicks - including a spectacular finish from the boundary for his eighth goal.

Bewick retired after the 2000 AFL Grand Final, in which Essendon defeated Melbourne by 60 points, claiming the club's record 16th AFL premiership.

Since retiring from playing Bewick has worked in junior coaching and development. He is the long-standing coach of Eastern Ranges in the NAB League, the premier underage competition in Victoria. He first gained the position in 2010 and coached them to a premiership in 2013.

== Playing statistics ==
Legend
G	Goals	K	Kicks	D	Disposals	T	Tackles
B	Behinds	H	Handballs	M	Marks

Season	Team	No.	Games	Totals							Averages (per game)						
Season	Team	No.	Games	G	B	K	H	D	M	T	G	B	K	H	D	M	T
1988	Essendon	8	18	19	19	253	74	327	58	25	1.1	1.1	14.1	4.1	18.2	3.2	1.4
1989	Essendon	8	13	30	14	163	60	223	43	26	2.3	1.1	12.5	4.6	17.2	3.3	2.0
1990	Essendon	8	25	37	33	338	112	450	68	30	1.5	1.3	13.5	4.5	18.0	2.7	1.2
1991	Essendon	8	18	25	19	279	113	392	59	7	1.4	1.1	15.5	6.3	21.8	3.3	0.4
1992	Essendon	8	20	32	28	271	94	365	66	21	1.6	1.4	13.6	4.7	18.3	3.3	1.1
1993†	Essendon	8	24	52	30	315	119	434	61	38	2.2	1.3	13.1	5.0	18.1	2.5	1.6
1994	Essendon	8	21	20	34	302	110	412	79	24	1.0	1.6	14.4	5.2	19.6	3.8	1.1
1995	Essendon	8	10	21	13	138	53	191	22	13	2.1	1.3	13.8	5.3	19.1	2.2	1.3
1996	Essendon	8	18	28	21	226	89	315	61	15	1.6	1.2	12.6	4.9	17.5	3.4	0.8
1997	Essendon	8	5	2	4	48	22	70	13	3	0.4	0.8	9.6	4.4	14.0	2.6	0.6
1998	Essendon	8	23	32	16	256	87	343	64	17	1.4	0.7	11.1	3.8	14.9	2.8	0.7
1999	Essendon	8	24	20	17	301	73	374	54	27	0.8	0.7	12.5	3.0	15.6	2.3	1.1
2000†	Essendon	8	19	14	12	195	64	259	48	26	0.7	0.6	10.3	3.4	13.6	2.5	1.4
Career			238	332	260	3085	1070	4155	696	272	1.4	1.1	13.0	4.5	17.5	2.9	1.1
