= Anthony Franchina =

Australian rules footballer

Personal information
- Born: 11 October 1977 (age 49)
- Original team: Calder Cannons (TAC Cup)
- Debut: Round 20, 16 August 1997, Carlton vs. Geelong, at Kardinia Park

Playing career^{1}
Years	Club	Games (Goals)
1997–2003	Carlton	105 (26)
- ^{1} Playing statistics correct to the end of 2003.

Anthony Franchina (born 11 October 1977) is a former Australian rules footballer in the Australian Football League.

Debuting in 1997, Franchina became a regular first-team midfielder at the Carlton Football Club. He was originally from Newlands-Coburg.

In 2003 he found himself dropped from the team on a few occasions, and in 2004 the final straw came for him, when he was delisted without playing a game for the year.

In 2005, he played in the Victorian Football League for the North Ballarat Roosters. In 2006, he returned to the Northern Bullants, Carlton's VFL-affiliate, as a VFL-listed player, where he regularly played in the seniors.

Since 2007, Franchina has played suburban football. From 2007 until the middle of 2011, he played for the Heidelberg Football Club in the Northern Football League, winning their best and fairest in 2008, and winning three premierships with the club. At the end of June 2011, he made a mid-season switch to the Balwyn Football Club in the Eastern Football League. Then he played for Pascoe Vale in the Essendon District Football League in 2012; and for Mornington in the Mornington Peninsula Nepean Football League in 2013.
