= Andrew Leoncelli =

Australian rules footballer

Personal information
- Full name: Andrew Leoncelli
- Born: 17 July 1974 (age 52)
- Original team: Xavier College
- Height: 186 cm (6 ft 1 in)
- Weight: 85 kg (187 lb)
- Position: Midfielder

Playing career^{1}
Years	Club	Games (Goals)
1996–2003	Melbourne	146 (66)
- ^{1} Playing statistics correct to the end of 2003.

Andrew Leoncelli (born 17 July 1974) is a former Italian-Australian rules footballer who played for Melbourne Football Club in the Australian Football League (AFL).

Leoncelli was recruited by Carlton in the 1993 Pre-Season Draft, . Leoncelli was delisted from the senior list of Carlton and was offered a place on their supplementary list but found the club environment at Carlton overly focused on senior older more established players with junior development low on the clubs priority at that time. He decided to move on from the club at the end of 1994 when he moved to Brisbane to pursue in his education, where he studied law and commerce at the University of Queensland in St Lucia. Leoncelli lifted weights and ran to keep fit also playing soccer and some games of rugby union, but it was when he saw the Brisbane Lions training at his university that he realised how much he missed the game. He wrote David Parkin a letter saying he refused to believe he was finished at 19 years of age and to watch out for his return. He moved back to Melbourne then played amateur football for the Old Xaverians in 1995 winning the club best and fairest, playing state football for Victoria and winning the Victorian Amateur Football Association premiership.

He finally made his league debut in 1996 with Melbourne. Playing in the midfield Leoncelli had a good 1997 season, finishing third in the Demons' best and fairest despite only playing 12 games because of a stress fracture. He built his game playing against the likes of Nicky Winmar, Peter Riccardi and Mark Ricciuto.

In 1999 he had the most kicks in the Melbourne team and made the Victorian State of Origin side. He was appointed deputy vice-captain for 2000 and played a vital role in Melbourne's finals series, but had an uncharacteristic disappointing game in the Grand Final. He had a flat 2001 season and at one stage was dropped, but followed up with a fine 2002 season. Leoncelli was forced into retirement late in 2003 at the age of 29, having played all of the 16 games up to that point. He made the shortlist for the VFL/AFL Italian Team of the Century.

== Post-football life ==
Since retiring from the AFL, he joined the Hamton Property Group as a development manager, and was a director of the Melbourne Football Club. He studied commerce at the University of Melbourne.

On the morning of 1 June 2017, Leoncelli was onboard Malaysia Airlines Flight 128 when it performed an emergency landing at Melbourne Airport due to a passenger claiming that they had a bomb on board and was going to blow up the plane. The plane landed safely and the passenger was arrested.
