= Steven Alessio =

Australian rules footballer, born 1971

Personal information
- Born: 8 November 1971 (age 54)
- Original teams: St Olivers & St. Joseph's CBC North Melbourne
- Debut: 23 May 1992, Essendon vs. Carlton, at Princes Park

Playing career^{1}
Years	Club	Games (Goals)
1992–2003	Essendon	184 (193)
- ^{1} Playing statistics correct to the end of 2003.

Career highlights
- AFL premiership player: 2000

Steven Alessio (born 8 November 1971), is a former Australian rules footballer with the Essendon Football Club. He played 184 games for Essendon between 1992 and 2003. Of Italian descent and named in the VFL/AFL Italian Team of the Century in 2007. Alessio was named as the starting ruckman for Essendon's 'Best of the AFL era' (post-1990) team, named in 2015.

He was reportedly recruited after walking into the clubhouse and asking for a trial, instead of being selected through the player draft. He was given the number 27 guernsey (which had been made famous by Essendon's champion ruckman Simon Madden and has been given to ruckmen ever since). He played in their 2000 premiership team. Alessio was noted for his ability to play forward, averaging more than a goal a game.

At the end of 2002, Alessio was delisted and then re-drafted by Essendon, and accepted only match fees during his final season in 2003. Alessio retired at the end of the 2003 season after 184 games.

After retiring from football he has worked for the Essendon Football Club in a variety of roles, including football operations manager, ruck coach and corporate relationships manager. In 2023, he coached St. Bernards Old Collegians to the VAFA Premier B Competition Premiership in an undefeated season.

Alessio is the uncle of both Matthew Watson, who played for Carlton, and his sister, Liz Watson, an international netball player for Australia.

== Playing statistics ==
Legend
G	Goals	K	Kicks	D	Disposals	T	Tackles
B	Behinds	H	Handballs	M	Marks	H/O	Hit-outs

Season	Team	No.	Games	Totals								Averages (per game)							
Season	Team	No.	Games	G	B	K	H	D	M	T	H/O	G	B	K	H	D	M	T	H/O
1992	Essendon	44	5	2	1	27	29	56	17	8	42	0.4	0.2	5.4	5.8	11.2	3.4	1.6	8.4
1993	Essendon	27	12	8	8	73	49	122	42	12	104	0.7	0.7	6.1	4.1	10.2	3.5	1.0	8.7
1994	Essendon	27	18	16	7	116	107	223	66	16	161	0.9	0.4	6.4	5.9	12.4	3.7	0.9	8.9
1995	Essendon	27	16	28	12	137	73	210	91	14	85	1.8	0.8	8.6	4.6	13.1	5.7	0.9	5.3
1996	Essendon	27	18	22	14	108	83	191	71	21	121	1.2	0.8	6.0	4.6	10.6	3.9	1.2	6.7
1997	Essendon	27	9	11	5	61	43	104	37	8	75	1.2	0.6	6.8	4.8	11.6	4.1	0.9	8.3
1998	Essendon	27	12	15	10	82	63	145	61	14	110	1.3	0.8	6.8	5.3	12.1	5.1	1.2	9.2
1999	Essendon	27	22	34	11	168	133	301	114	25	249	1.5	0.5	7.6	6.0	13.7	5.2	1.1	11.3
2000	Essendon	27	24	24	13	125	121	246	83	37	209	1.0	0.5	5.2	5.0	10.3	3.5	1.5	8.7
2001	Essendon	27	17	13	11	92	83	175	59	33	207	0.8	0.6	5.4	4.9	10.3	3.5	1.9	12.2
2002	Essendon	27	15	11	6	79	63	142	44	30	145	0.7	0.4	5.3	4.2	9.5	2.9	2.0	9.7
2003	Essendon	27	16	9	6	90	48	138	43	12	170	0.6	0.4	5.6	3.0	8.6	2.7	0.8	10.6
Career			184	193	104	1158	895	2053	728	230	1678	1.0	0.6	6.3	4.9	11.2	4.0	1.3	9.1
