= Mathew Capuano =

Australian rules footballer

Personal information
- Born: 2 September 1975 (age 51)
- Original team: Creswick / Geelong U18
- Debut: Round 13, 18 June 1994, North Melbourne vs. Richmond, at the MCG
- Height: 198 cm (6 ft 6 in)
- Weight: 99 kg (218 lb)

Playing career^{1}
Years	Club	Games (Goals)
1994–2000	North Melbourne	82 (24)
2001–2003	St Kilda	25 (13)
Total		107 (37)
- ^{1} Playing statistics correct to the end of 2003.

Career highlights
- AFL Rising Star nominee 1995; North Melbourne premiership side 1996, 1999

Mathew Capuano (born 2 September 1975) is a former Australian rules footballer who spent his AFL career with the North Melbourne Football Club and the St Kilda Football Club. Post playing career Capuano was a development coach at the Carlton Football Club.

He was famously sacked by St. Kilda during the 2003 season.

== Kangaroos career ==
Capuano made his AFL debut for North Melbourne in the 1994 season. He played a total of 82 games for the Kangaroos, and was a member of the club's 1996 and 1999 premiership side.

== St Kilda career ==
Capuano's career with the Saints was plagued by shoulder and knee injuries. He played 25 games in his three seasons for the Saints. Although making his 100th AFL appearance in Round 8, 2002, he underwent knee surgery after Round 9 and missed all remaining AFL games that season.

=== Mid-season sacking ===
After making six appearances in the first nine rounds of the 2003 season, Capuano was sacked by the Saints. The coach, Grant Thomas, explained that Capuano's poor form led to his sacking. While it is suggested that the young and rising Saints did not need Capuano's service anymore, the Saints were also criticised for axing Capuano at the wrong time as Trent Knobel and Barry Brooks, their other two ruckmen, were both injured at the time.

Although a number of VFL clubs sought Capuano's services after he was sacked, he did not accept any offers and spent the latter half of 2003 travelling in Europe. He also did not nominate for the 2003 AFL draft and spent 2004 playing for South Fremantle in the West Australian Football League.

== Coaching ==
Capuano signed with the Carlton Football Club in 2009 to coach their ruckmen on a part-time basis. The following season, the Blues made Capuano a full-time development coach and a direct ruck coach. He remained with Carlton in the development role until the end of the 2017 AFL season.

== Playing statistics ==
Legend
G	Goals	K	Kicks	D	Disposals	T	Tackles
B	Behinds	H	Handballs	M	Marks	H/O	Hit-outs

Season	Team	No.	Games	Totals								Averages (per game)							
Season	Team	No.	Games	G	B	K	H	D	M	T	H/O	G	B	K	H	D	M	T	H/O
1994	North Melbourne	40	3	1	0	3	4	7	6	3	3	0.3	0.0	1.0	1.3	2.3	2.0	1.0	1.0
1995	North Melbourne	16	15	5	4	68	63	131	46	6	88	0.3	0.3	4.5	4.2	8.7	3.1	0.4	5.9
1996	North Melbourne	16	18	6	0	81	62	143	41	1	81	0.3	0.0	4.5	3.4	7.9	2.3	0.1	4.5
1997	North Melbourne	16	0	—	—	—	—	—	—	—	—	—	—	—	—	—	—	—	—
1998	North Melbourne	16	13	3	3	59	26	85	25	7	121	0.2	0.2	4.5	2.0	6.5	1.9	0.5	9.3
1999	Kangaroos	16	19	4	4	127	65	192	63	11	263	0.2	0.2	6.7	3.4	10.1	3.3	0.6	13.8
2000	Kangaroos	16	14	5	2	69	19	88	36	13	129	0.4	0.1	4.9	1.4	6.3	2.6	0.9	9.2
2001	St Kilda	16	12	8	0	70	26	96	51	4	119	0.7	0.0	5.8	2.2	8.0	4.3	0.3	9.9
2002	St Kilda	16	7	4	0	44	37	81	37	3	37	0.6	0.0	6.3	5.3	11.6	5.3	0.4	5.3
2003	St Kilda	16	6	1	0	27	24	51	21	7	43	0.2	0.0	4.5	4.0	8.5	3.5	1.2	7.2
Career			107	37	13	548	326	874	326	55	884	0.3	0.1	5.1	3.0	8.2	3.0	0.5	8.3
