= Anthony Ingerson =

Australian rules footballer

Personal information
- Born: 13 October 1969 (age 57)
- Original team: Central District (SANFL)
- Height: 193 cm (6 ft 4 in)
- Weight: 97 kg (214 lb)

Playing career^{1}
Years	Club	Games (Goals)
1992–1995	Adelaide	37 (25)
1996–2001	Melbourne	121 (15)
Total		158 (40)
- ^{1} Playing statistics correct to the end of 2001.

Anthony Ingerson (born 13 October 1969) is a former Australian rules footballer who played with Adelaide and Melbourne in the Australian Football League (AFL).

Recruited from South Australian National Football League (SANFL) side Central District, Ingerson played mostly as a centre half forward while at Adelaide. He was traded to Melbourne in the 1996 pre-season and was used in defence at his new club by Melbourne coach Neale Daniher.

Ingerson was selected in the South Australian State of Origin squad in 1999 but did not play. In 2000 he played on Matthew Lloyd in the grand final and retired midway through the following season after suffering a knee injury.
