= Matthew Allan =

Australian rules footballer (born 1975)

Personal information
- Born: 26 February 1975 (age 51)
- Original team: North Ringwood
- Debut: Round 15, 2 July 1994, Carlton vs. Brisbane Bears, at Optus Oval
- Height: 200 cm (6 ft 7 in)
- Weight: 104 kg (229 lb)

Playing career^{1}
| Years | Club | Games (Goals) |
| 1994–2003 | Carlton | 140 (72) |
| 2004–2005 | Essendon | 21 (1) |
| Total | | 161 (73) |
- ^{1} Playing statistics correct to the end of 2005.

Career highlights
- Carlton Pre-Season Cup Win 1997; Equal 3rd Brownlow Medal 1999

Matthew Allan (born 26 February 1975) is a former Australian rules footballer in the Australian Football League.

He joined with the Carlton Football Club in 1992, and debuted in 1994 as the 1000th player to represent Carlton. He played as a ruckman, reaching his peak in 1999, when he won the John Nicholls Medal, won All-Australian selection and was selected for the International rules series.

He was traded to the Essendon Football Club following some foot injuries and made his debut with the club in 2004. He had a solid year, playing 20 games and helping Essendon to the finals (along with Justin Murphy, another recycled player). In 2005, he played one game before knee soreness resurfaced (which had kept him out of action for four games in 2004), and following this, at the end of the season Allan confirmed his retirement.

== Statistics ==
Legend
| G | Goals | K | Kicks | D | Disposals | T | Tackles |
| B | Behinds | H | Handballs | M | Marks | H/O | Hit-outs |

| Season | Team | No. | Games | Totals | | | | | | | | Averages (per game) | | | | | | | | Votes |
| Season | Team | No. | Games | G | B | K | H | D | M | T | H/O | G | B | K | H | D | M | T | H/O | Votes |
|---|---|---|---|---|---|---|---|---|---|---|---|---|---|---|---|---|---|---|---|---|
| 1994 | Carlton | 24 | 5 | 1 | 2 | 21 | 7 | 28 | 14 | 0 | 10 | 0.2 | 0.4 | 4.2 | 1.4 | 5.6 | 2.8 | 0.0 | 2.0 | 0 |
| 1995 | Carlton | 24 | 10 | 6 | 5 | 51 | 28 | 79 | 38 | 7 | 48 | 0.6 | 0.5 | 5.1 | 2.8 | 7.9 | 3.8 | 0.7 | 4.8 | 0 |
| 1996 | Carlton | 24 | 19 | 3 | 4 | 84 | 76 | 160 | 55 | 9 | 145 | 0.2 | 0.2 | 4.4 | 4.0 | 8.4 | 2.9 | 0.5 | 7.6 | 0 |
| 1997 | Carlton | 24 | 21 | 8 | 10 | 178 | 129 | 307 | 113 | 10 | 263 | 0.4 | 0.5 | 8.5 | 6.1 | 14.6 | 5.4 | 0.5 | 12.5 | 3 |
| 1998 | Carlton | 24 | 22 | 15 | 7 | 156 | 126 | 282 | 118 | 14 | 471 | 0.7 | 0.3 | 7.1 | 5.7 | 12.8 | 5.4 | 0.6 | 21.4 | 4 |
| 1999 | Carlton | 24 | 26 | 19 | 14 | 208 | 197 | 405 | 162 | 13 | 716 | 0.7 | 0.5 | 8.0 | 7.6 | 15.6 | 6.2 | 0.5 | 27.5 | 20 |
| 2000 | Carlton | 24 | 19 | 17 | 11 | 143 | 128 | 271 | 106 | 10 | 373 | 0.9 | 0.6 | 7.5 | 6.7 | 14.3 | 5.6 | 0.5 | 19.6 | 6 |
| 2001 | Carlton | 24 | 8 | 3 | 2 | 53 | 41 | 94 | 34 | 4 | 126 | 0.4 | 0.3 | 6.6 | 5.1 | 11.8 | 4.3 | 0.5 | 15.8 | 0 |
| 2002 | Carlton | 24 | 4 | 0 | 0 | 22 | 26 | 48 | 19 | 4 | 85 | 0.0 | 0.0 | 5.5 | 6.5 | 12.0 | 4.8 | 1.0 | 21.3 | 0 |
| 2003 | Carlton | 24 | 6 | 0 | 0 | 29 | 15 | 44 | 16 | 4 | 83 | 0.0 | 0.0 | 4.8 | 2.5 | 7.3 | 2.7 | 0.7 | 13.8 | 0 |
| 2004 | Essendon | 27 | 20 | 1 | 1 | 107 | 91 | 198 | 65 | 9 | 309 | 0.1 | 0.1 | 5.4 | 4.6 | 9.9 | 3.3 | 0.5 | 15.5 | 0 |
| 2005 | Essendon | 27 | 1 | 0 | 0 | 6 | 0 | 6 | 4 | 0 | 17 | 0.0 | 0.0 | 6.0 | 0.0 | 6.0 | 4.0 | 0.0 | 17.0 | 0 |
| Career | | | 161 | 73 | 56 | 1058 | 864 | 1922 | 744 | 84 | 2646 | 0.5 | 0.3 | 6.6 | 5.4 | 11.9 | 4.6 | 0.5 | 16.4 | 33 |
