= Gary Moorcroft =

Australian rules footballer, born 1976

- Moorcroft's 2001 Mark of the Year

Personal information
- Full name: Gary Moorcroft
- Born: 16 April 1976 (age 50)
- Original team: Northern Knights
- Debut: Round 5, 1995, Essendon vs. St Kilda, at Optus Oval, Melbourne
- Height: 173 cm (5 ft 8 in)
- Weight: 86 kg (190 lb)

Playing career^{1}
Years	Club	Games (Goals)
1995–2002	Essendon	95 (102)
2003	Melbourne	3 (2)
Total		98 (104)
- ^{1} Playing statistics correct to the end of 2003.

Career highlights
- Morrish Medal 1994; AFL Mark of the Year 2001; Premiership side 2000

Gary Moorcroft (born 16 April 1976) is a former Australian rules football player for Essendon and Melbourne in the Australian Football League (AFL).

Moorcroft caught the attention of talent scouts by winning the Morrish Medal in 1994 whilst playing for the Northern Knights.

Moorcroft participated in the 2000 premiership with Essendon and a runner-up Grand Final side against the Brisbane Lions in 2001. He was delisted by Essendon in 2002 after playing 95 games and struggling to retain his spot in a very talented side. It was the Demons, who Essendon beat in the 2000 grand final, who picked him up in the 2002 AFL draft.

Moorcroft played in three losing games with the Demons and suffered a severe season-ending knee injury after a lacklustre team debut. This effectively brought an end to his chances of working his way back into the side, and he was almost immediately delisted. The then-27-year-old's 98-game, nine-year AFL career ended there.

Moorcroft is best known for winning the 2001 Mark of the Year while playing with Essendon, taking a spectacular high-flying mark in Round 14, 2001, over Western Bulldogs' forward Brad Johnson; it is considered to be the greatest mark of all time by many, including in a 2021 AFL-run poll of more than 30,000 fans, where Moorcroft won with 25% of the vote, with the runner-up being Jack Riewoldt's 2021 mark against Adelaide with 15%.

The mark was particularly notable in that Moorcroft first jumped onto Johnson's back and then leapt even higher into the air by leveraging himself off Johnson; this is very rare, as players will usually jump onto their opponent's back and then merely hang at the same height while taking the mark (hence the colloquial term hanger for such a mark). For a similar reason, Johnson is often referred to as the springboard for this mark, while the term stepladder is used for the player underneath a hanger.

Moorcroft also managed to kick six goals before half-time in the same game, including five goals in the second quarter; for reference, Moorcroft had kicked just three goals from the past nine games. His dominance in the first half was so profound that at one stage he had two players playing on him at the same time, including opposition captain Chris Grant, just to negate his impact. In fact, he had five different opponents within the first half. Moorcroft found out eight months later that he had fractured his hip in the process of his famous mark, severely limiting his career prospects.

Moorcroft spent a season at Bendigo Bombers in the VFL before retiring from AFL/VFL and moving into the local leagues. In 2005, Moorcroft joined the Silvan F.C. in the Yarra Valley Mountain Football League. During his time at Silvan, Moorcroft won four club best-and-fairest awards and broke the 100-goal mark twice, including topping the goalkicking tables of all leagues, with 163 goals in 2008 alone. In fact, this season was so dominant for Moorcroft that he had registered his 100th goal during Round 11. Of his three grand finals at Silvan, two of these were back-to-back premierships in 2007/08.

In 2009/10, Moorcroft was playing for the Romsey Redbacks in the Riddell District Football League (RDFL).

In 2011, Moorcroft joined Bundoora in the Northern Football League (NFL) and has played in three premierships with the Bulls (2011, 2013 & 2017). As a 41-year-old, he kicked the winning goal in the 2017 Grand Final. At the completion of the 2019 season, while still playing at a high level at Bundoora, and at 43 years old, Moorcroft announced his retirement from senior footy, seemingly for good.

However, in December 2022, Moorcroft announced his intent to join South Morang FC for their 2023 season.

== Playing statistics ==
Season	Team	No.	Games	Totals							Averages (per game)						
Season	Team	No.	Games	G	B	K	H	D	M	T	G	B	K	H	D	M	T
1995	Essendon	46	1	0	1	3	2	5	1	2	0.0	1.0	3.0	2.0	5.0	1.0	2.0
1996	Essendon	46	0	—	—	—	—	—	—	—	—	—	—	—	—	—	—
1997	Essendon	46	11	7	5	102	53	155	36	27	0.6	0.5	9.3	4.8	14.1	3.3	2.5
1998	Essendon	29	17	14	9	114	53	167	53	28	0.8	0.5	6.7	3.1	9.8	3.1	1.6
1999	Essendon	29	17	30	19	157	68	225	55	32	1.8	1.1	9.2	4.0	13.2	3.2	1.9
2000	Essendon	29	18	23	9	144	54	198	54	20	1.3	0.5	8.0	3.0	11.0	3.0	1.1
2001	Essendon	29	16	15	9	117	50	167	59	15	0.9	0.6	7.3	3.1	10.4	3.7	0.9
2002	Essendon	29	15	13	10	113	47	160	54	13	0.9	0.7	7.5	3.1	10.7	3.6	0.9
2003	Melbourne	7	3	2	0	21	10	31	8	7	0.7	0.0	7.0	3.3	10.3	2.7	2.3
Career			98	104	62	771	337	1108	320	144	1.1	0.6	7.9	3.4	11.3	3.3	1.5
