= Daniel Ward (footballer) =

Australian rules footballer (born 1977)

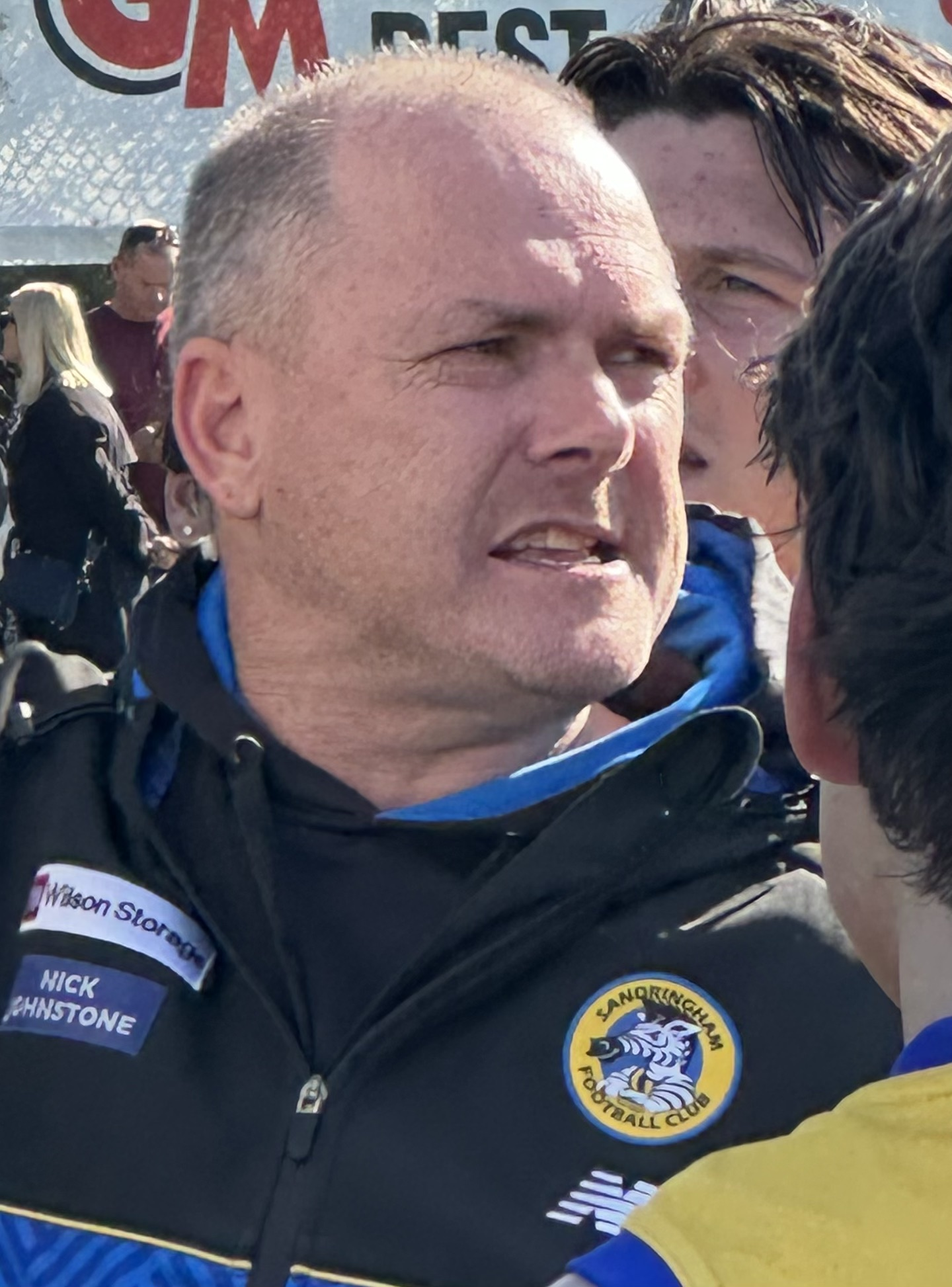
- Ward in July 2026

Personal information
- Full name: Daniel Ward
- Born: 9 July 1977 (age 49)
- Original team: Hoppers Crossing
- Height: 185 cm (6 ft 1 in)
- Weight: 84 kg (185 lb)

Playing career^{1}
Years	Club	Games (Goals)
1997–2007	Melbourne	136 (31)
- ^{1} Playing statistics correct to the end of 2007.

Daniel Ward (born 9 July 1977) is an Australian rules football coach and former player.

Ward was a defender and was named as Melbourne's 'Most Improved Player' after the 1999 season. Two years later he was fifth in Melbourne's best and fairest. He is a former Fitzroy Football Club reserves player.

Ward was a 'run and carry' type player, known for his dashing runs and rebounding attacks from defence. His style of play was not flashy, but very determined and team centred. Despite Melbourne losing the 2000 Grand Final to Essendon, Ward was amongst Melbourne's best performed players that day.
