= Shannon Motlop =

Australian rules footballer, born 1978

Personal information
- Born: 18 August 1978 (age 48); Tiwi Islands, Australia
- Original team: Wanderers (NTFL) / North Adelaide (SANFL)
- Debut: Round 10, 6 June 1999, Kangaroos vs. Port Adelaide, at the MCG
- Height: 182 cm (6 ft 0 in)
- Weight: 105 kg (231 lb)

Playing career^{1}
Years	Club	Games (Goals)
1999–2003	Kangaroos	54 (31)
2005–2006	Melbourne	10 (5)
Total		64 (36)
- ^{1} Playing statistics correct to the end of 2006.

Career highlights
- North Melbourne Premiership Side 1999

Shannon Motlop (born 18 August 1978) is an Indigenous Larrakia Australian rules footballer. Primarily playing as a midfielder or small forward, he represented both the Kangaroos and Melbourne in the Australian Football League. He currently plays for the Robinvale Football Club in Robinvale.

== Early career ==
Shannon started his playing career with the Northern Territory Football League's Wanderers, a club with which the Motlop family have many associations. As a teenager, he moved to the North Adelaide Roosters in the South Australian National Football League as a teenager, from where he was selected by North Melbourne as the 85th pick in the 1998 National Draft.

== Kangaroos ==
Motlop represented the Kangaroos in seven matches during his debut season, including the victorious 1999 Grand Final against Carlton. He then became a regular selection for the next two years, during which time he was joined at the club by his brother Daniel. But poor form saw him fall out of favour, making only 12 appearances from the start of 2002 until his eventual delisting at the end of the following season. Having not been picked up by another AFL club and facing the prospect of an end to his time playing at the highest level of the sport, Motlop rejoined the Roosters for 2004.

== Melbourne Football Club ==
He was given a second chance at the start of the following year, when Melbourne recruited him as a replacement for Troy Broadbridge, who had died during the Boxing Day tsunami. But despite being a stalwart for the club's aligned Victorian Football League side, Sandringham Zebras, during their successful 2005 and 2006 premiership campaigns, Motlop failed to break into the first team, playing just ten times before being delisted once more at the end of his second season and returning to North Adelaide for a third spell.

== Dunolly Football Club ==
It was revealed that for the 2009 season, Motlop would play for the Dunolly Football Club in country Victoria. He played a handful of games for Dunolly in 2009. He scored a goal with his first touch of the footy at Princess Park, playing against Avoca. He played alongside former A.F.L. player Robbie Ahmat.

In the 2009 Grand Final, Shannon was awarded the best afield medal, despite Dunolly losing the game to Newstead by 9 points. Shannon Motlop was a great addition both on and off the field for Dunolly in 2009.

== Playing statistics ==
Legend
G	Goals	K	Kicks	D	Disposals	T	Tackles
B	Behinds	H	Handballs	M	Marks

Season	Team	No.	Games	Totals							Averages (per game)						
Season	Team	No.	Games	G	B	K	H	D	M	T	G	B	K	H	D	M	T
1999	Kangaroos	44	7	5	1	30	14	44	8	6	0.7	0.1	4.3	2.0	6.3	1.1	0.9
2000	Kangaroos	44	19	13	7	103	66	169	25	30	0.7	0.4	5.4	3.5	8.9	1.3	1.6
2001	Kangaroos	44	16	6	5	107	55	162	32	27	0.4	0.3	6.7	3.4	10.1	2.0	1.7
2002	Kangaroos	44	9	5	2	61	33	94	17	9	0.6	0.2	6.8	3.7	10.4	1.9	1.0
2003	Kangaroos	44	3	2	2	28	14	42	12	4	0.7	0.7	9.3	4.7	14.0	4.0	1.3
2005	Melbourne	44	7	5	3	61	25	86	17	15	0.7	0.4	8.7	3.6	12.3	2.4	2.1
2006	Melbourne	44	3	0	1	25	11	36	5	6	0.0	0.3	8.3	3.7	12.0	1.7	2.0
Career			64	36	21	415	218	633	116	97	0.6	0.3	6.5	3.4	9.9	1.8	1.5

== Robinvale Football Club ==
At the start of the 2010 Sunraysia Football League season, Motlop began a new venture with the Robinvale Football Club. Motlop was drawn to Robinvale for many reasons, one in particular was the Indigenous round that Robinvale competes in during the SFL Season.

== St. Arnaud Football Club ==
Motlop has recently signed with St. Arnaud Football Club, and will play with the Saints in 2012 as they attempt to climb the ladder from a winless last position in 2011. He played in the 2012 Grand Final loss to Wedderburn.

He was awarded runner-up in the club's Best and Fairest.
