= Matthew Burton (Australian footballer) =

Australian rules footballer, born 1970

Personal information
- Full name: Matthew Thomas Burton
- Born: 19 May 1970 (age 56); Perth, Western Australia
- Original team: Subiaco (WAFL)
- Debut: Round 1, 1 April 1995, Fremantle. vs. Richmond., at the MCG
- Height: 210 cm (6 ft 11 in)

Playing career^{1}
Years	Club	Games (Goals)
1990–1993	West Coast	0 (0)
1995–1999	Fremantle	70 (32)
2000–2003	Kangaroos	77 (33)
Total		147 (65)
- ^{1} Playing statistics correct to the end of 2003.

Career highlights
- Former tallest player in the AFL

Matthew Thomas "Spider" Burton (born 19 May 1970) is a retired Australian rules footballer. He played as a ruckman and began his Football career at Subiaco. "Spider" Burton, as he's commonly known, because of his 210 cm (6 ft 11 in) frame, was formerly the AFL's tallest player. He has since been eclipsed by another Docker in Aaron Sandilands, Geelong Football Club and Western Bulldogs' Peter Street, Geelong Football Club and GWS Giants Dawson Simpson and Collingwood’s Mason Cox, all of whom stand at 211 cm tall.

== West Coast ==
Selected by West Coast with pick #36 in the 1990 National Draft, Burton spent four seasons on the Eagles' senior list before he was eventually delisted (without playing a game for the club) at the end of the 1994 season (under an AFL ruling that clubs cut list numbers back from 52 to 40).

== Fremantle Dockers ==
In 1994, Fremantle picked up Burton in the pre-season draft. He played in Fremantle's first match in the AFL. In 1999, he was made vice-captain of the club but played only seven games that year before being delisted.

== Kangaroos ==
In 1999, Burton was picked by the Kangaroos with selection 74 in the pre-season draft. He retired in 2003 having played a total of 147 games.
