= Jeff White (Australian footballer) =

Australian rules footballer, born 1977

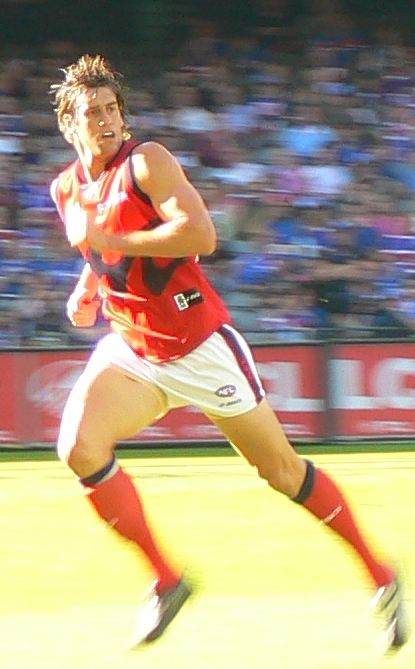
- White in Melbourne's away strip at the MCG in 2007

Personal information
- Full name: Jeffrey Newman White
- Born: 19 February 1977 (age 49)
- Original teams: Dandenong Stingrays; Frankston Rovers
- Draft: 1st overall, 1994 – Fremantle
- Height: 195 cm (6 ft 5 in)
- Weight: 95 kg (209 lb)
- Position: Ruck

Playing career^{1}
Years	Club	Games (Goals)
1995–1997	Fremantle	32 (18)
1998–2008	Melbourne	236 (95)
Total		268 (113)

Representative team honours^{2}
Years	Team	Games (Goals)
1998–1999, 2008	Victoria	1 (?)
- ^{1} Playing statistics correct to the end of Rnd 22, 2008.^{2} Representative statistics correct as of 2008.

Career highlights
- State of Origin Victoria 1998, 1999, 2008 (Squad); Keith 'Bluey' Truscott Medal 2004; All-Australian Team 2004

Jeffrey Newman "Jeff" White (born 19 February 1977) is an Australian rules footballer who had a distinguished career in the Australian Football League (AFL) spanning 14 years. He played most recently and notably for the Melbourne Football Club, following a move from the Fremantle Dockers at the end of 1997. He was Melbourne's first-choice ruckman for a decade, relying on his key attributes of athleticism and durability. He was an All-Australian in 2004, and was selected for Victoria several times. He was an important member of the Melbourne sides which made the 2000 AFL Grand Final and qualified for six finals series from 1998 to 2006.

White's career was punctuated by serious injuries to his shin and face, in 2003 and 2005 respectively. He cemented his reputation as one of the premier ruckmen in the AFL with consistent displays for Melbourne during his eleven years at the club. Former team-mate, fellow long-serving Melbourne ruckman, and Melbourne chairman Jim Stynes called White an "ornament to the game and particularly to the Melbourne Football Club." His contract with Melbourne was not renewed in 2008 and White signed to play in 2009 with the Redland Australian Football Club in the AFL Queensland State League.

== Personal life ==
White grew up in Victoria and was keen to return to Melbourne after he was drafted to the Fremantle Dockers in Western Australia. He was married to Stacy, and in Melbourne they lived at Sandringham. The pair met on the Gold Coast, and married there in October 2005. On 5 May 2007, Stacy gave birth to the couple's first child, son Kalani Jordan. White has stated his desire to move to the Gold Coast once his playing career in Melbourne is finished, and mooted that a role with the proposed Gold Coast AFL team is possible in either a development or coaching capacity. In September 2008, he launched a sports classified website, SponsorThem, which is a specialised networking site for athletes. White wanted to impart his knowledge of social media to other athletes, which grew into his own business, White Echo, launched in 2009. White is an avid golfer and is a member of the Huntingdale Golf Club, and also plays regularly at the Royal Melbourne Golf Club. He plays off of a handicap of 5. At his final press-conference with Melbourne, he jokingly stated that a card on the seniors' Champions Tour was a potential aim once his football career is finished.

In 2018, White suffered a stroke caused by a hole in his heart. White underwent successful heart surgery and was fitted with a monitor to alert of any future irregularities.

== Playing career ==
White played for the Dandenong Stingrays in the TAC Cup in 1993 and 1994. He was drafted with the number 1 pick in the 1994 AFL draft—the first Dandenong player to be drafted with the highest pick. Travis Johnstone—who was White's team-mate at Melbourne for 10 years—is the only other Dandenong player to be selected with the first pick in an AFL draft. White was one of six Dandenong players selected to play for Vic Metro at the Teal Cup—the national under 18 championships—in 1994. Following his performances for Vic Metro, he was named as an All-Australian at Under 18 level.

=== Fremantle ===
White was drafted by the Fremantle Dockers as the number 1 pick, which Fremantle were granted by the AFL because 1995 was the club's first season in the competition. White made his debut in Round 3 of Fremantle's inaugural season in a victory over Fitzroy. He played six matches in 1995, kicking three goals but averaging less than three hit-outs per game. The 1996 season saw him play 13 matches and kick 13 goals and greatly improve his average number of disposals. He was nominated for the AFL Rising Star award in Round 19 in a 24-point win against Collingwood. He had 22 disposals, 11 marks, kicked a goal and received three Brownlow Medal votes for his stand-out performance for the season. In his final season at Fremantle, White took on greater responsibility of the ruck-work, and averaged 10 hit-outs per game for the season. He played the first 12 matches of the season, but was then dropped for nine matches until the final match of the season—and of his Fremantle career. Fremantle's performances were largely consistent during White's three seasons with them, as they finished 13th in both 1995 and 1996, and 12th in 1997.

White was handed the number 34 guernsey at Fremantle and he wore the number for the rest of his career. He credits Percy Johnson with guiding his ruck style in his time with Fremantle. He played 32 games and kicked 18 goals with the Dockers between 1995 and 1997, before being traded back to his home state of Victoria to play for Melbourne. Salary-cap breaches involved in White's trade caused Melbourne to forfeit their highest selection (pick number 5) in the 1999 draft to Fremantle.

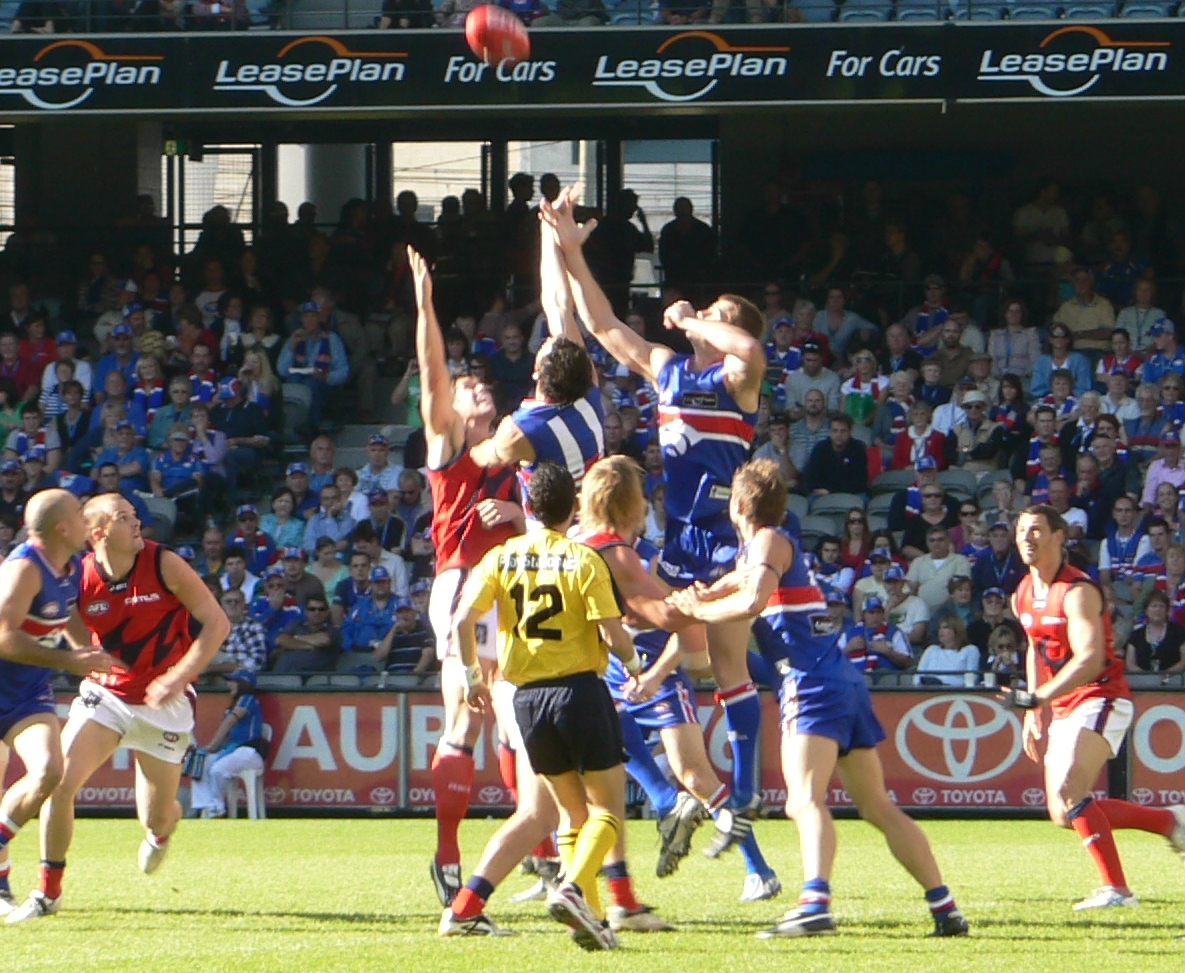
White (in red with arm raised) rucking for Melbourne against Peter Street and Luke Darcy of the Western Bulldogs

=== Melbourne ===
==== Early seasons ====
Melbourne traded their two highest selections in the 1997 draft (picks 2 and 18) to Fremantle in return for White. He was a key signing in Melbourne's attempt to rebuild its squad, and in his first season at Melbourne he shared the rucking duties with Jim Stynes, the latter mentoring White in their only season together. He played in all of Melbourne's 25 matches for the season as they reached the preliminary final, where they lost to North Melbourne. He received 11 votes in the Brownlow Medal for the season. After a promising start to his career in Melbourne, 1999 was less successful. White's disposals and scoring statistics dropped significantly, and he tellingly failed to record any votes in the Brownlow Medal. In 2000, he was a key member of the Melbourne side that reached the Grand Final, with many pundits seeing White as the best Melbourne player on the ground in the loss to Essendon, as he had 24 hit-outs and 14 disposals. He kicked 16 goals and averaged 21 hit-outs per game for the season, and as in 1998, he recorded 11 Brownlow Medal votes. He effected the most number of hit-outs in the league for the season, with 499.

White played all but one of Melbourne's matches in 2001, and after a commanding performance against his former club in Round 21 where had 33 possessions, kicked two goals, and received three Brownlow Medal votes, then-Fremantle coach Ben Allan responded to a suggestion that White may leave Melbourne at the end of the season by saying "we'll have him back". White recorded the most hit-outs in the league in 2002, with 561, playing in all of Melbourne's matches in a run that saw them narrowly lose to Adelaide by two goals in a semi-final. The 2003 season was disappointing for both Melbourne, and White personally. His average number of hit-outs dropped by more than six per game, he averaged fewer than eight kicks per match, and did not receive any Brownlow Medal votes.

==== Consistent form ====
The following season saw a vast improvement in White's personal performance, as he enjoyed the finest season of his career, winning Melbourne's best-and-fairest, receiving All-Australian selection, and ranking second in the league for total number of hit-outs. He reached the top ten in the 2004 Brownlow Medal with 15 votes, including four best-on-ground displays, with dominant performances against North Melbourne and Fremantle among them. His most productive period came between Rounds 9 and 16, where he recorded three best-on-ground displays, averaged 25 hit-outs and received 13 Brownlow Medal votes. His Round 6 performance against Carlton is also noted as one of his career-best performances, with Melbourne winning by more than 100 points, as White recorded 26 disposals, took eight marks, kicked one goal, and received the three Brownlow votes for his influential display. Coinciding with White's career-best form, Melbourne sat atop the AFL ladder after Round 18, but in the final month of the season, the team lost its last five matches, finishing fifth after Round 22, and losing to Essendon in the Elimination Final. The 2005 season was less successful for both White and Melbourne, with the club struggling to cement a place in the top eight during the year, although they managed to finish seventh after a strong finish to the minor round, and qualify for the club's second consecutive finals series—the first time it had competed in consecutive finals series since 1991. Melbourne again lost in the Elimination Final, this time to Geelong. It was during this match that White sustained his career-threatening facial injury.

Following the 2005 season, he signed a three-year deal with Melbourne—his last contract with the club—worth A$1.4m. He was an integral part of Melbourne's strong 2006 form, as the team won 11 out of 12 games after losing the first three matches of the season. He was named among the best Melbourne players in the side's come-from-behind victory against St Kilda in the Elimination Final. Melbourne lost to Fremantle the following week, ending their third consecutive finals series. During 2006, White effected fewer hit-outs than in 2005, although his total number of disposals, marks and goals were all significantly improved. He played all of Melbourne's matches that season, as he did for four seasons from 2004—a consistent run which saw him play more than 100 consecutive matches after he missed games in 2003 due to a serious shin injury and a knee injury, until Round 12, 2008. In both 2005 and 2006, he ranked third in the league in number of hit-outs.

==== Final years ====
"[White's] integrity and dignity is beyond reproach. He's been an outstanding person and an outstanding player for the Melbourne Football Club."
-Dean Bailey reflecting on White's career, August 2008.

Melbourne's poor form throughout the 2007 season, when they won just five matches, saw the side finish 14th. White brought up his milestone 250th AFL-game in Round 19 with a win over the Western Bulldogs. His last season with Melbourne was 2008, in which he was dropped for the first time in his Melbourne career, despite returning to some of his best form. His average number of disposals per match (18.5) was the highest of any season in his career. His long-time understudy Mark Jamar assumed White's position as the premier ruckman at Melbourne, allowing Paul Johnson to play the second-ruckman role. It was the first time in 20 years that anyone other than White or Jim Stynes had been the first-choice ruckman at Melbourne for an extended run of matches. Coach Dean Bailey said that 2008 was the most difficult season that White and team-mate Adem Yze had experienced at the club—the side finished bottom and won just three games. Bailey praised both White and Yze on their professionalism and attitude at the end of the season—the pair's last at Melbourne. White played 15 games in 2008—his lowest total in a season with Melbourne. He finished his career at Melbourne in Round 22 against Richmond, kicking two goals and having 17 possessions. He received 53 Brownlow votes throughout his career—47 with Melbourne and six with Fremantle. He reached double-figures in Brownlow votes on three occasions, with his highest being the 15 votes he received in 2004. He received his final Brownlow vote in Round 7, 2008, in Melbourne's win over Fremantle. He received Brownlow votes in nine of his 14 AFL seasons.

He was named as one of Melbourne's 150 Legends during the club's 150th anniversary celebrations, and finished his career with the seventh-highest number of appearances for Melbourne with 236. He was made a life member of the Melbourne Football Club during 2008. White was delisted from Melbourne following the 2008 season, but has stated that he hopes to play on for one or two more seasons at another AFL club: "From a personal point of view, I still feel like I've got some time left." His preference would have been to continue at Melbourne, saying, "I love the club and would love to play on" but that he "totally understands" his delisting. Dean Bailey spoke highly of White's leadership at Melbourne, saying that White will leave a lasting legacy at the club.

=== Season 2009 ===
Carlton coach Brett Ratten suggested that he would "have to go back and have a look" at the possibility of drafting White for the 2009 season. Ratten cited White's experience and leadership in helping to guide the younger ruckmen at Carlton as a potential draw-card. St Kilda was also suggested as a possible destination for White to continue his playing career, but the Sydney Swans later emerged as the most likely destination for White. Ultimately White signed to play in 2009 with the Redland Australian Football Club in the AFL Queensland State League. After one season with Redlands he retired from playing and joined Gold Coast Football Club as a coach

=== Victoria ===
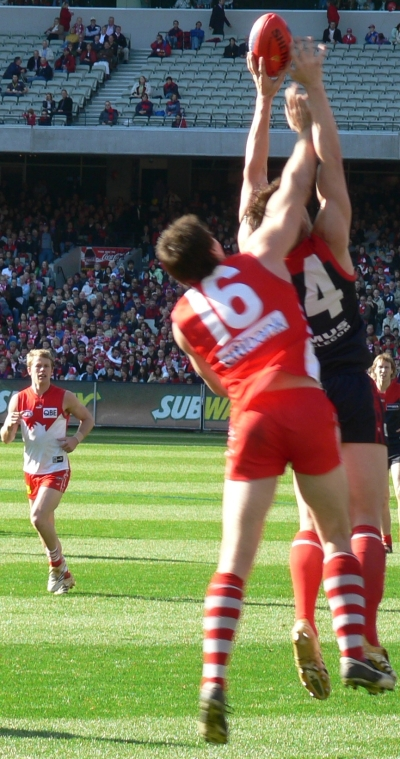
White (right) contesting an overhead mark against former understudy Darren Jolly

During 1998—his first year living back in Melbourne—he was selected to play for Victoria. He was selected in the squad of 25 for Victoria in 1999 but did not make the final 22 for the match against South Australia. This was the last State-of-Origin match, although a Victoria team was selected to play against a Dream Team in the AFL Hall of Fame Tribute Match in 2008—White was selected in the initial 40-man squad for Victoria, but once again did not make the final 22. He was Melbourne's only representative in the squad. Playing for Victoria in 1998 was his only representative appearance.

== Playing style ==
White's kicking accuracy was of particular note for a ruckman—his goal-kicking accuracy finished at slightly less than 60%. He was a consistent exponent of the spectacular mark, preferring to take chest marks high over packs. He was nominated on several occasions for the Mark of the Year, but he never won the award. His ball-skills and work around the ground remained one of his greatest strengths throughout his career. He effected 5000 hit-outs in his AFL career, the most by any one player since records began in 1987, with a career-high game total of 47 during a resounding round-22 win over West Coast Eagles in 2000. Testament to his durability and consistency, he was ranked in the top five in the AFL in total number of hit-outs for nine consecutive seasons from 1999. At 195 cm, White is relatively short for a ruckman, and operated more as a ruck-rover than as a traditional ruckman. He was noted for his athleticism and vertical-leap, which helped him overcome his lack of height in comparison to other ruckmen. His approach to ruck-work—with greater emphasis on possessing the ball and working around the ground—helped him adapt to the changed centre-circle rules, and compensated for his lack of height and diminished ability at stoppages. Following the departure of Jim Stynes from Melbourne, White later worked on his game with former ruckman Sam Newman. Percy Johnson, Stynes and finally Newman guided and influenced White's ruck-work during his career.

== Injuries ==
Throughout the latter stages of his career, he wore special thigh- and shin-pads to protect himself from injury in the ruck—his specially designed shin-pad was required to protect a problematic shin injury which had threatened his career. During a match in 2003, he was kicked in the shin, causing his shin-pad to crack and split the skin, leaving a laceration about the size of a tablespoon. Once the wound had healed, White's surgeon told him that if it split open again, he would have to stop playing. White has said that this "reality check" helped to strengthen his focus and helped him deal with injuries more effectively. He said that the specially designed shin-guard and those who designed it "saved his career". (The shin-guard can be seen on White's right-leg in the photos on this page.)

In 2005, he was involved in a horrific on-field incident with Geelong's Steven King. As King attempted to kick the ball out of mid-air, he missed and collected White's face at the height of his leg's swing, causing facial injuries that required extensive surgery, inserting five metal plates and 14 screws into White's jaw and face. It was viewed as an accident by the AFL tribunal and no action was taken against King. As the incident took place in Melbourne's final match of the season—Geelong winning the match and knocking Melbourne out of the finals—White was able to recover during the off-season and did not miss a match, despite the severity of the injury. White's wedding to his fiancée Stacy was postponed until later in the year due to the injury.

== Statistics ==
Legend
G	Goals	K	Kicks	D	Disposals	T	Tackles
B	Behinds	H	Handballs	M	Marks	H/O	Hit-outs

Season	Team	No.	Games	Totals								Averages (per game)							
Season	Team	No.	Games	G	B	K	H	D	M	T	H/O	G	B	K	H	D	M	T	H/O
1995	Fremantle	34	6	3	1	25	12	37	12	4	16	0.5	0.2	4.2	2.0	6.2	2.0	0.7	2.7
1996	Fremantle	34	13	13	5	80	39	119	54	8	70	1.0	0.4	6.2	3.0	9.2	4.2	0.6	5.4
1997	Fremantle	34	13	2	4	88	51	139	65	2	131	0.2	0.3	6.8	3.9	10.7	5.0	0.2	10.1
1998	Melbourne	34	25	17	16	184	129	313	140	15	409	0.7	0.6	7.4	5.2	12.5	5.6	0.6	16.4
1999	Melbourne	34	19	7	7	119	115	234	93	17	371	0.4	0.4	6.3	6.1	12.3	4.9	0.9	19.5
2000	Melbourne	34	24	16	8	218	175	393	148	37	499	0.7	0.3	9.1	7.3	16.4	6.2	1.5	20.8
2001	Melbourne	34	21	3	6	202	121	323	98	28	398	0.1	0.3	9.6	5.8	15.4	4.7	1.3	19.0
2002	Melbourne	34	24	3	5	236	123	359	133	50	561	0.1	0.2	9.8	5.1	15.0	5.5	2.1	23.4
2003	Melbourne	34	16	9	1	127	107	234	83	17	277	0.6	0.1	7.9	6.7	14.6	5.2	1.1	17.3
2004	Melbourne	34	23	8	5	222	177	399	127	38	523	0.3	0.2	9.7	7.7	17.3	5.5	1.7	22.7
2005	Melbourne	34	23	7	4	169	145	314	92	56	532	0.3	0.2	7.3	6.3	13.7	4.0	2.4	23.1
2006	Melbourne	34	24	11	4	214	187	401	135	54	481	0.5	0.2	8.9	7.8	16.7	5.6	2.3	20.0
2007	Melbourne	34	22	7	7	186	170	356	127	41	461	0.3	0.3	8.5	7.7	16.2	5.7	5.8	21.0
2008	Melbourne	34	15	7	4	135	143	278	93	21	271	0.5	0.3	9.0	9.5	18.5	6.2	1.4	18.1
Career			268	113	77	2205	1694	3899	1400	388	5000	0.4	0.3	8.2	6.3	14.5	5.2	1.4	18.7
