= Guy Rigoni =

Australian rules footballer, born 1974

Personal information
- Full name: Guy Damien Rigoni
- Born: 27 July 1974 (age 52)
- Original team: Myrtleford
- Debut: Round 1, 29 March 1998, Melbourne vs. Fremantle, at Subiaco
- Height: 181 cm (5 ft 11 in)
- Weight: 86 kg (190 lb)

Playing career^{1}
Years	Club	Games (Goals)
1998–2005	Melbourne	107 (35)
- ^{1} Playing statistics correct to the end of 2005.

Career highlights
- Harold Ball Memorial Trophy: 1998; Norm Goss Medal: 2004; VFL premiership play: 2004, 2005, 2006

Guy Damien Rigoni (born 27 July 1974) is a former Australian rules footballer who played for Melbourne in the Australian Football League (AFL).

Rigoni was initially drafted by Hawthorn in 1993 and spend 2 seasons in their reserve side, despite many best on ground performances Rigoni remained without a senior game. He then returned to his country club Myrtleford, after winning the 1997 best and fairest at Myrtleford he was invited to play for Melbourne's reserves in their final game of the season. Rigoni had 33 possessions and was given a second chance at AFL football when Melbourne selected him in the draft. He finally began his career in 1998, and played every game that season. In later years he started developing back problems that limited his appearances, and after not playing a game in the second half of the 2001 season and all of 2002, he was delisted at the end of the 2002 season. However, but after having an operation on his back he was redrafted by Melbourne in the 2003 pre-season draft. He finally reached his 100th game in 2005, which was to be his final season at AFL level. Struggling with form, in his last year, Rigoni made several appearances in the reserves Sandringham side. In October of that year he announced his retirement from the AFL at 31 years of age.

Rigoni went on to play with the Demons' Victorian Football League affiliate the Sandringham Zebras, becoming one of their best players and participating in the club's Premiership Three-Peat of 2004–2006.

Rigoni's daughter Jemma was drafted to Melbourne in 2023 AFL Women's draft under the father–daughter rule before switching to play with Collingwood for the 2026 AFL Women's season.
