= Paul Barnard =

Australian rules footballer

Personal information
- Full name: Paul Andrew Luke Barnard
- Born: 13 February 1973 (age 53)
- Original team: East Perth
- Height: 189 cm (6 ft 2 in)
- Weight: 93 kg (205 lb)

Playing career^{1}
Years	Club	Games (Goals)
1994 – 1995	Hawthorn	11 (4)
1996 – 2003	Essendon	140 (75)
Total		151 (79)
- ^{1} Playing statistics correct to the end of 2003.

Career highlights
- Essendon Premiership Player - 2000

Paul Andrew Luke Barnard (born 13 February 1973) is a former Australian rules footballer who played from 1994 until 2003.

Originally from East Perth, where he played 29 games from 1992 to 1993, Barnard's first two seasons of AFL were spent with Hawthorn. After managing only 11 games, he came to Essendon as part of a trade with Paul Salmon. He played as a utility and was a hard man. He kicked four goals in Essendon's grand final win over Melbourne in 2000.

At the end of the 2003 season, Barnard knew that his body had had enough of the physical battering from the rugged playing style that had earned him his reputation for toughness.

== Playing statistics ==
Legend
G	Goals	K	Kicks	D	Disposals	T	Tackles
B	Behinds	H	Handballs	M	Marks

Season	Team	No.	Games	Totals							Averages (per game)						
Season	Team	No.	Games	G	B	K	H	D	M	T	G	B	K	H	D	M	T
1994	Hawthorn	27	3	2	4	10	4	14	3	0	0.7	1.3	3.3	1.3	4.7	1.0	0.0
1995	Hawthorn	27	8	2	2	92	43	135	38	7	0.3	0.3	11.5	5.4	16.9	4.8	0.9
1996	Essendon	16	15	3	8	107	93	200	47	21	0.2	0.5	7.1	6.2	13.3	3.1	1.4
1997	Essendon	16	5	0	1	34	14	48	13	3	0.0	0.2	6.8	2.8	9.6	2.6	0.6
1998	Essendon	16	17	4	5	116	84	200	68	14	0.2	0.3	6.8	4.9	11.8	4.0	0.8
1999	Essendon	16	22	6	3	151	132	283	69	15	0.3	0.1	6.9	6.0	12.9	3.1	0.7
2000	Essendon	16	22	10	9	182	104	286	84	24	0.5	0.4	8.3	4.7	13.0	3.8	1.1
2001	Essendon	16	24	25	14	233	132	365	136	48	1.0	0.6	9.7	5.5	15.2	5.7	2.0
2002	Essendon	16	24	23	22	191	104	295	106	37	1.0	0.9	8.0	4.3	12.3	4.4	1.5
2003	Essendon	16	11	4	1	59	58	117	37	14	0.4	0.1	5.4	5.3	10.6	3.4	1.3
Career			151	79	69	1175	768	1943	601	183	0.5	0.5	7.8	5.1	12.9	4.0	1.2
