= Brent Grgic =

Australian rules footballer

Personal information
- Full name: Brent Grgic
- Born: 8 October 1979 (age 47)
- Original team: Geelong U-18s
- Height: 192 cm (6 ft 4 in)
- Weight: 93 kg (205 lb)

Playing career
Years	Club	Games (Goals)
1997 – 2001	Melbourne	77 (29)
2002 – 2003	Geelong	13 (3)
Total		90 (32)

Brent Grgic (born 8 October 1979) is a former Australian rules footballer who played five seasons for Melbourne, before playing two seasons for Geelong in the Australian Football League (AFL).
