= Anthony McDonald (Australian footballer) =

Australian rules footballer

Personal information
- Full name: Anthony McDonald
- Born: 13 June 1972 (age 54)
- Original team: Coburg
- Draft: 59th overall, 1996 AFL draft
- Height: 182 cm (6 ft 0 in)
- Weight: 82 kg (181 lb)

Playing career^{1}
Years	Club	Games (Goals)
1997–2002	Melbourne	104 (41)
- ^{1} Playing statistics correct to the end of 2002.

Career highlights
- Harold Ball Memorial Trophy: 1997

Anthony McDonald (born 13 June 1972) is a former Australian rules footballer who played for Melbourne in the Australian Football League (AFL).

McDonald played his early football in the Victorian Football League (VFL) with Coburg and had stints at both the Carlton and Hawthorn reserves teams without being able to make it into the AFL. By the time he made his league debut in 1997, McDonald was 24, but played 19 consecutive games from round four to round 22.

He appeared in six finals at Melbourne, including the 2000 AFL Grand Final where, playing as a wingman, he had 12 disposals and four tackles in a loss. Two years later, McDonald retired to become a mortgage broker at Port Finance Group.

For much of McDonald's career, he was one of three brothers playing in the AFL with his eldest brother Alex at Collingwood and youngest James a teammate at Melbourne.
