= David Schwarz (footballer) =

Australian rules footballer, born 1972

Personal information
- Full name: David Schwarz
- Nickname: The Ox
- Born: 24 July 1972 (age 54)
- Original team: Sunbury
- Height: 195 cm (6 ft 5 in)
- Weight: 105 kg (231 lb)
- Position: Forward

Playing career^{1}
Years	Club	Games (Goals)
1991–2002	Melbourne	173 (244)

Representative team honours^{2}
Years	Team	Games (Goals)
1999	Victoria	1 (0)
- ^{1} Playing statistics correct to the end of 2002.^{2} Representative statistics correct as of 1999 season.

Career highlights
- Keith 'Bluey' Truscott Medal: 1999

David Schwarz (born 24 July 1972) is a former Australian rules footballer, who retired in 2002 after playing for the Melbourne Football Club in the Australian Football League (AFL) for 12 seasons.

== Football career ==
Recruited from Sunbury, Schwarz made his AFL debut in 1991. As a player for the Melbourne Football Club, he was known as "the Ox" for his beast-like build. He played centre half-forward or full-forward, and in 1994 he kicked nine goals straight against Sydney. He also had some stand-out finals performances this year, including baulking an opponent in the right forward pocket and taking on a second defender to score a goal, and a memorable blind turn against Carlton. Schwarz was renowned for his strong marking, agility and athleticism, until he suffered numerous knee injuries, playing only two games in 1995 and missing the entire 1996 season.

Schwarz resumed playing in 1997 at a weight of 103 kilograms (227 lb), which was 3 kilograms (6.6 lb) above the weight he subsequently carried in 2000. He capped his effort by winning the club's best and fairest in 1999 and passing the 100-game mark—something that was unthinkable a few years earlier when knee injuries left his career in tatters. In typical style, he celebrated with 20 of his closest mates and his mother, who had brought him up single-handedly since the age of eight. His father had been murdered.

Late in his playing career, just after his 150th game, he appeared as a panellist on the AFL Footy Show in a memorable show where Sam Newman threw a pie in his face (a reference to being a gift from the Pies for Melbourne's disappointing performance the week before). A visibly angry Schwarz pushed Newman down to the ground, with the latter lucky not to suffer serious injury. However, Newman later claimed the whole bit was a setup.

He retired in the middle of 2002 having played 173 matches and kicking 244 goals.

== Playing statistics ==
Legend
G	Goals	K	Kicks	D	Disposals	T	Tackles
B	Behinds	H	Handballs	M	Marks

Led the league after season and finals

Season	Team	No.	Games	Totals							Averages (per game)						
Season	Team	No.	Games	G	B	K	H	D	M	T	G	B	K	H	D	M	T
1991	Melbourne	44	6	7	3	39	16	55	16	1	1.2	0.5	6.5	2.7	9.2	2.7	0.2
1992	Melbourne	5	22	20	7	239	115	354	112	40	0.9	0.3	10.9	5.2	16.1	5.1	1.8
1993	Melbourne	5	9	5	7	72	42	114	49	10	0.6	0.8	8.0	4.7	12.7	5.4	1.1
1994	Melbourne	5	25	60	23	280	126	406	173	34	2.4	0.9	11.2	5.0	16.2	6.9	1.4
1995	Melbourne	5	2	3	1	5	5	10	4	0	1.5	0.5	2.5	2.5	5.0	2.0	0.0
1996	Melbourne	5	0	—	—	—	—	—	—	—	—	—	—	—	—	—	—
1997	Melbourne	5	10	18	15	57	18	75	37	4	1.8	1.5	5.7	1.8	7.5	3.7	0.4
1998	Melbourne	5	18	29	21	123	63	186	56	22	1.6	1.2	6.8	3.5	10.3	3.1	1.2
1999	Melbourne	5	22	38	27	206	133	339	107	18	1.7	1.2	9.4	6.0	15.4	4.9	0.8
2000	Melbourne	5	25	31	35	246	138	384	117	43	1.2	1.4	9.8	5.5	15.4	4.7	1.7
2001	Melbourne	5	21	21	16	231	123	354	105	53	1.0	0.8	11.0	5.9	16.9	5.0	2.5
2002	Melbourne	5	13	11	7	91	43	134	31	23	0.8	0.5	7.0	3.3	10.3	2.4	1.8
Career			173	243	162	1589	822	2411	807	248	1.4	0.9	9.2	4.8	13.9	4.7	1.4

== Media career ==
Following his football career, Schwarz joined new sport radio station SEN 1116 in 2005 in Melbourne; at his time on SEN, he admitted that during his football career he had a gambling problem and whittled away most of his income. He hosted The Run Home on SEN from 3–7 pm weekdays with Mark Allen until 8 December 2017. From 2007 to 2010, Schwarz was a part of Channel Seven's AFL commentary team.

In 2018, Schwarz joined Macquarie sports radio alongside Mark Allen to host the drive slot after their dismissals from SEN. On 1 November 2019, the pair concluded their term at MSR as the station's entire line-up was axed.

Since 2020, Schwarz and Allen present The Twilight Zone on 3AW from 5–7pm on Saturdays and Sundays, mainly during the AFL off-season. He is also a commentator with 3AW and its Perth sister station 6PR.
