= Chris Heffernan =

Australian rules footballer, born 1979

Personal information
- Full name: Chris Joel Heffernan
- Nickname: The Heff
- Born: 29 January 1979 (age 47)
- Original team: [Terang Bloods]
- Draft: 2nd overall, 1996 AFL draft
- Height: 186 cm (6 ft 1 in)
- Weight: 83 kg (183 lb)
- Position: Midfielder

Playing career^{1}
| Years | Club | Games (Goals) |
| 1997–2002 | Essendon | 97 (38) |
| 2003–2005 | Melbourne | 47 (10) |
| 2006–2007 | Essendon | 26 (8) |
| Total | | 170 (56) |

International team honours^{2}
| Years | Team | Games (Goals) |
| 2000 | Australia | 2 (0) |
- ^{1} Playing statistics correct to the end of 2007.^{2} Representative statistics correct as of 2000.

Career highlights
- AFL Premiership 2000; International Rules Series 2000

Chris Joel Heffernan (born 29 January 1979) is a former Australian rules footballer who played in the Australian Football League (AFL).

== AFL career ==
Known affectionately as "Heff", Heffernan began his career in 1997 with the Essendon Football Club. Heffernan had a brilliant year in 2000 when he played solid consistent football in the midfield and was part of the Bombers side that lost only one game for the entire season, winning the AFL Grand Final and Ansett Cup Final in the process. Heffernan was also rewarded with an appearance in the International rules football series in 2000. Heffernan also played in another AFL Grand Final (albeit a losing one) in 2001.

However, when Essendon ran into salary cap issues at the end of the 2002 season, he was traded to the Melbourne Football Club for a swap of first round draft selections.

His trade to Melbourne only months after signing a three-year contract with Essendon, prompted the AFL Players Association to introduce the Heffernan Clause into the players standard collective bargaining agreement, to prevent players from being traded within 12 months of signing a contract.

Heffernan did not have the same spark at Melbourne. He finished the 2003 with a depressed fracture of his cheekbone and had a solid year in 2004 before getting suspended and missing the finals at the end of the season, but in 2005 his performances were average. At the end of 2005 Melbourne delisted Heffernan, but Essendon picked him up with the last pick in the 2006 AFL preseason draft.

Heffernan played out the rest of his career with the Bombers, before announcing his retirement from AFL football on 2 October 2007 after being told that he was unlikely to play often under new coach Matthew Knights.

In 2020, Heffernan released his Autobiography "Heffernan: More than meets the eye".

== Personal life ==
After retiring from football he worked in New York for Deutsche Bank for three years before returning to Melbourne to work for Ernst and Young. In 2011 he joined the Essendon Football Club board as a non-executive director.

== Playing statistics ==
Legend
| G | Goals | K | Kicks | D | Disposals | T | Tackles |
| B | Behinds | H | Handballs | M | Marks |

| Season | Team | No. | Games | Totals | | | | | | | Averages (per game) | | | | | | |
| Season | Team | No. | Games | G | B | K | H | D | M | T | G | B | K | H | D | M | T |
|---|---|---|---|---|---|---|---|---|---|---|---|---|---|---|---|---|---|
| 1997 | Essendon | 26 | 3 | 0 | 0 | 11 | 9 | 20 | 4 | 5 | 0.0 | 0.0 | 3.7 | 3.0 | 6.7 | 1.3 | 1.7 |
| 1998 | Essendon | 26 | 12 | 3 | 0 | 71 | 53 | 124 | 12 | 31 | 0.3 | 0.0 | 5.9 | 4.4 | 10.3 | 1.0 | 2.6 |
| 1999 | Essendon | 26 | 22 | 13 | 4 | 226 | 119 | 345 | 60 | 41 | 0.6 | 0.2 | 10.3 | 5.4 | 15.7 | 2.7 | 1.9 |
| 2000 | Essendon | 26 | 21 | 4 | 6 | 194 | 115 | 309 | 54 | 67 | 0.2 | 0.3 | 9.2 | 5.5 | 14.7 | 2.6 | 3.2 |
| 2001 | Essendon | 26 | 16 | 6 | 5 | 110 | 69 | 179 | 36 | 33 | 0.4 | 0.3 | 6.9 | 4.3 | 11.2 | 2.3 | 2.1 |
| 2002 | Essendon | 26 | 23 | 12 | 4 | 195 | 101 | 296 | 58 | 64 | 0.5 | 0.2 | 8.5 | 4.4 | 12.9 | 2.5 | 2.8 |
| 2003 | Melbourne | 1 | 20 | 7 | 4 | 188 | 115 | 303 | 60 | 61 | 0.4 | 0.2 | 9.4 | 5.8 | 15.2 | 3.0 | 3.1 |
| 2004 | Melbourne | 1 | 18 | 2 | 4 | 165 | 119 | 284 | 44 | 71 | 0.1 | 0.2 | 9.2 | 6.6 | 15.8 | 2.4 | 3.9 |
| 2005 | Melbourne | 1 | 9 | 1 | 3 | 45 | 35 | 80 | 20 | 28 | 0.1 | 0.3 | 5.0 | 3.9 | 8.9 | 2.2 | 3.1 |
| 2006 | Essendon | 26 | 19 | 6 | 4 | 154 | 147 | 301 | 66 | 72 | 0.3 | 0.2 | 8.1 | 7.7 | 15.8 | 3.5 | 3.8 |
| 2007 | Essendon | 26 | 7 | 2 | 0 | 42 | 42 | 84 | 16 | 26 | 0.3 | 0.0 | 6.0 | 6.0 | 12.0 | 2.3 | 3.7 |
| Career | | | 170 | 56 | 34 | 1401 | 924 | 2325 | 430 | 499 | 0.3 | 0.2 | 8.2 | 5.4 | 13.7 | 2.5 | 2.9 |
