= Adrian Hickmott =

Australian rules footballer

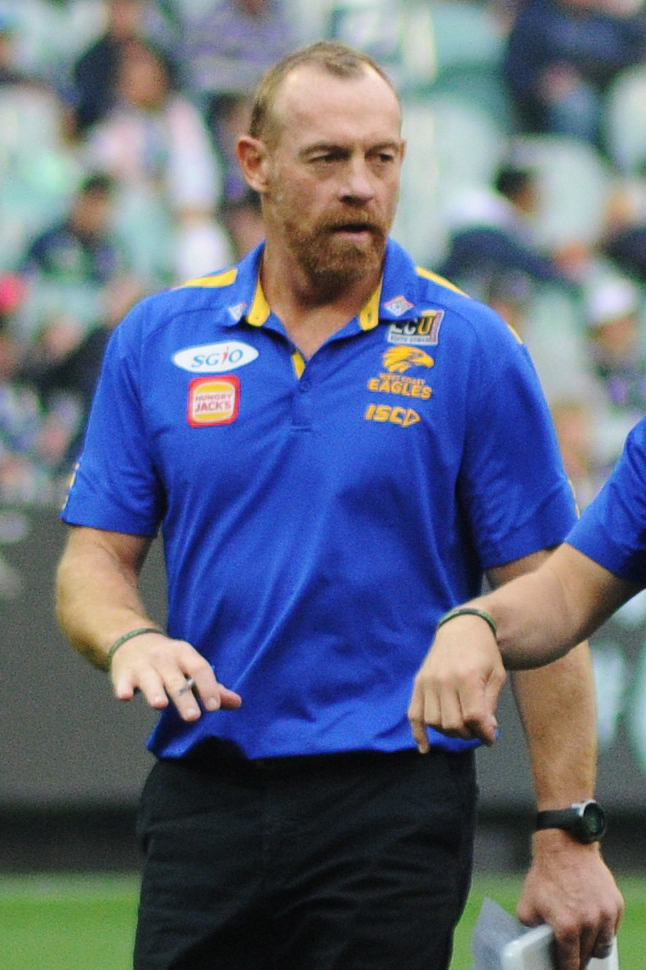
- Hickmott with West Coast in April 2018

Personal information
- Born: 30 March 1972 (age 54)
- Original team: Horsham
- Debut: Round 24, 1992, Geelong vs. Essendon, at Waverley Park
- Height: 182 cm (6 ft 0 in)
- Weight: 88 kg (194 lb)

Club information
- Current club: Hawthorn (assistant coach)

Playing career^{1}
Years	Club	Games (Goals)
1992–1995	Geelong	50 (24)
1996–2003	Carlton	134 (107)
Total		184 (131)
- ^{1} Playing statistics correct to the end of 2003.

Adrian Hickmott (born 30 March 1972) is an Australian rules football coach and former player. He is currently an assistant coach with the Hawthorn Football Club. As a player, he played with the Geelong Football Club and Carlton Football Club in the Australian Football League.

Hickmott was a utility player who had a tough style of play. He was usually used up forward but was also seen across half-back.

He started his career with Geelong in 1992 and played in the 1995 Grand Final loss to Carlton. It turned out to be his final game for the club, and he was traded to the side that won the Grand Final, Carlton.

With 22 games in his debut season at Carlton, he won their award for best first-year player, adding 17 more games the following year. Due to a knee injury, he missed all of the 1998 season, and in 1999 he played in another Grand Final, this time losing to North Melbourne.

In 2000 he kicked a career high of 27 goals for the year. The next season saw him gather 10 Brownlow Medal votes, the equal most by a Carlton player that season. For the next two years he was vice captain of the club and at the end of 2003 he was forced to retire after suffering a groin injury.

Hickmott was a development coach at the Essendon Football Club and until recently was serving as the backline coach at the West Coast Eagles. After serving as an assistant coach for West Coast over the past 10 years in a variety of different roles, including backline coach, contested ball coordinator and midfield coach, Hickmott joined the Hawthorn Football Club at the end of 2021.

== Statistics ==
Legend
G	Goals	K	Kicks	D	Disposals	T	Tackles
B	Behinds	H	Handballs	M	Marks

Season	Team	No.	Games	Totals							Averages (per game)							Votes
Season	Team	No.	Games	G	B	K	H	D	M	T	G	B	K	H	D	M	T	Votes
1992	Geelong	42	3	1	1	19	15	34	10	5	0.3	0.3	6.3	5.0	11.3	3.3	1.7	0
1993	Geelong	42	8	5	5	49	47	96	28	15	0.6	0.6	6.1	5.9	12.0	3.5	1.9	1
1994	Geelong	42	20	8	11	139	146	285	64	38	0.4	0.6	7.0	7.3	14.3	3.2	1.9	0
1995	Geelong	42	19	10	15	131	101	232	92	21	0.5	0.8	6.9	5.3	12.2	4.8	1.1	3
1996	Carlton	9	22	13	10	219	143	362	91	43	0.6	0.5	10.0	6.5	16.5	4.1	2.0	5
1997	Carlton	9	17	5	3	200	96	296	92	27	0.3	0.2	11.8	5.6	17.4	5.4	1.6	2
1998	Carlton	9	0	—	—	—	—	—	—	—	—	—	—	—	—	—	—	0
1999	Carlton	9	19	6	4	121	95	216	72	19	0.3	0.2	6.4	5.0	11.4	3.8	1.0	0
2000	Carlton	9	21	27	12	226	184	410	130	63	1.3	0.6	10.8	8.8	19.5	6.2	3.0	2
2001	Carlton	9	23	22	16	277	183	460	145	83	1.0	0.7	12.0	8.0	20.0	6.3	3.6	10
2002	Carlton	9	17	14	5	125	130	255	88	47	0.8	0.3	7.4	7.6	15.0	5.2	2.8	0
2003	Carlton	9	15	20	10	101	60	161	37	22	1.3	0.7	6.7	4.0	10.7	2.5	1.5	0
Career			184	131	92	1607	1200	2807	849	383	0.7	0.5	8.7	6.5	15.3	4.6	2.1	23

== Honours and achievements ==
Team

- Minor premiership (Geelong): 1992
