= Essendon v Western Bulldogs (2000 AFL season) =

2000 AFL Super-Flood Round 21, 2000 Essendon v Western Bulldogs
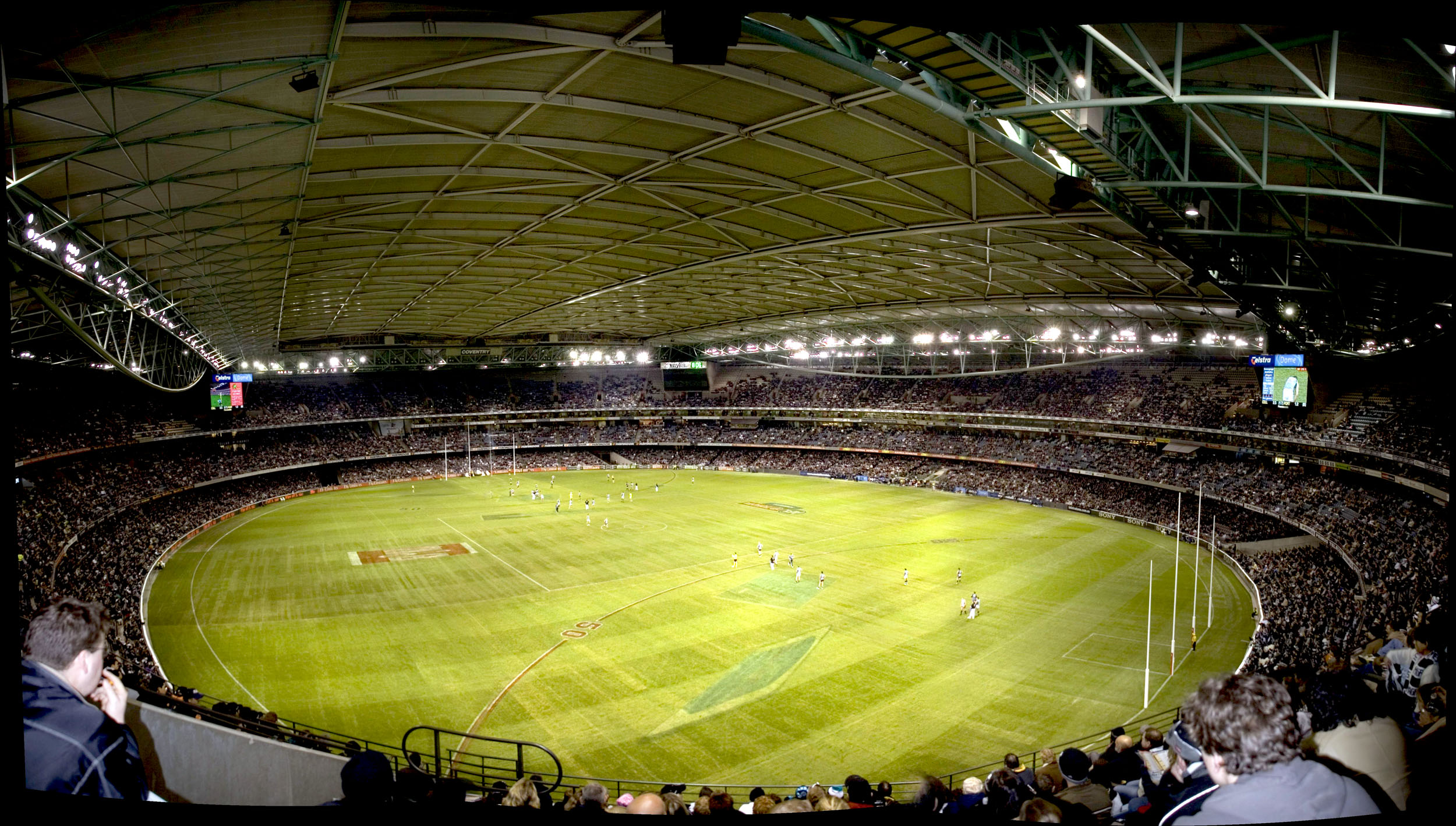

| Essendon | Western Bulldogs |
|---|---|
| 12.9 (81) | 14.8 (92) |
| | 1 | 2 | 3 | 4 |
|---|---|---|---|---|
| ESS | 3.2 (20) | 7.3 (45) | 11.7 (73) | 12.9 (81) |
| WB | 4.1 (25) | 7.3 (45) | 9.4 (58) | 14.8 (92) |
- Date: 28 July 2000
- Stadium: Colonial Stadium
- Attendance: 45,725

Broadcast in Australia
- Network: Seven Network
- Commentators: Bruce McAvaney, Jason Dunstall, Dermott Brereton

The Super-Flood is the unofficial title given to the round 21, 2000, match between Australian Football League (AFL) clubs Essendon and Western Bulldogs, which was played at Colonial Stadium on Friday, 28 July 2000.

Essendon went into the match having won its first twenty games of the home-and-away season, needing five more wins to complete the league's first perfect season. In a major upset, the Western Bulldogs employed a strong zone-flooding defence to win the match by eleven points and inflict Essendon's first and only defeat of the 2000 calendar year.

== Background ==
With twenty consecutive wins to start the twenty-two match 2000 AFL season, Essendon had already secured the season's minor premiership and top seeding by the time it faced the Western Bulldogs at Colonial Stadium. It now needed only two more wins to finish with a 22–0 record and become the first club since Collingwood in 1929 to complete an undefeated home-and-away season, and five more wins to complete a perfect season for the first time in VFL/AFL history. Its active twenty-game winning streak was the second-longest in VFL/AFL history, only three wins short of Geelong's all-time record of 23 wins, set in 1952–1953.

Essendon's opponent was the sixth-placed Western Bulldogs, entering the game with an 11–9 win–loss record and able to secure a finals berth with a win. Bulldogs coach Terry Wallace devised a plan, later to become known as the "super-flood", which involved most of his players flooding the Essendon forward 50 in an attempt to negate the Bombers attack. He had executed a similar game plan two weeks earlier against a second-placed Carlton team which entered the game on a thirteen-game winning streak: by deploying a loose man in defence to stifle scoring, the Bulldogs won a low-scoring game 11.9 (75) d. 11.6 (72), with what was the second-lowest winning score by any team for the 2000 season.

Wallace decided to implement a more extreme version of the same plan against the Essendon. At the time, Australian rules football was largely a positional game, so the sight of as many as 14 of the Bulldogs' 18 players occupying the defensive half of the ground was unusual. Wallace also did his best to mislead the opposition in the lead-up, publicly telling reporters about the need to kick goals because he didn't expect "a 12-goal game similar to the Carlton one", while secretly training for the super-flood gameplan at Chirnside Park in Werribee rather than in the open sessions at the Bulldogs' home ground Whitten Oval.

== Match summary ==
=== First quarter ===
The match was played under the roof at Colonial Stadium, so conditions were still. The Bulldogs attacked first, the very first centre clearance ending with a mark to Matthew Robbins 10m from goal on an angle, which was missed badly for a behind, but they continued to attack; and, after goals to Nathan Brown and Steven Kolyniuk, the early lead was 13 points. With the super-flood in effect, Essendon struggled to generate early chances in the forward line, and its first goal came when Stephen Alessio marked 80 metres from goal and Steven Kretiuk conceded a 50-metre penalty for knocking the ball away. The Bulldogs soon responded when Nathan Eagleton kicked a 50-metre set shot from a free kick, leading 3.1 (19) to 1.0 (6) halfway through the first quarter. Essendon's Damien Hardwick left the field with an ankle injury which kept him out for the rest of the game.

Michael Long set up Essendon's next goal, intercepting a handpass at full stretch in the middle of the field before and running forward, the goal finished by Matthew Lloyd. The Bulldogs again responded, with Tony Liberatore snapping a goal after roving a ball-up at full-forward, before Lloyd kicked his second goal from a broken contest in the goal square. Dustin Fletcher, normally at full-back but playing as a forward for much of the game, took a last shot from 60 metres which missed to the left. Dean Rioli also had two running shots which failed to score for Essendon in the first quarter, and at quarter time the Bulldogs led Essendon 4.1 (25) to 3.2 (20).

=== Second quarter ===
Essendon took its first lead of the game early in the second quarter when Fletcher converted a set shot from 40m. Soon after, a hurried shot by Blake Caracella from 50m out fell in the Essendon goalsquare, and it rolled through for a goal off Adam Ramanauskas's boot without Ramanauskas even appearing to notice. A more direct style of play led to another goal soon after, with Joe Misiti converting a 45m set shot, and Essendon led by 13 points, having kicked five of the last six goals – prompting the commentary team to question the defensive tactics. The Bulldogs scored next, Simon Garlick converting a 35m set shot after a mark. Essendon had a chance to respond after causing a turnover in its forward line, but Rioli's shot went out on the full. Fletcher then kicked his second goal of the quarter from a 60m set shot, restoring a 14-point advantage for Essendon.

The Bulldogs then had the best of the final part of the quarter. After a behind to Brad Johnson and another to Jose Romero, Brad Johnson kicked the last two goals of the quarter to even the score. For the first, Liberatore made a goal-saving tacking against Darren Bewick on the centre wing, won the ball, and rebounded to Johnson; and for the second, an attacking effort by Paul Hudson and Trent Bartlett ended in Johnson's hands. Johnson had yet another chance, but his 50m set shot fell short for no score. A few seconds before the half-time siren, Essendon's John Barnes knocked Johnson down off the ball with a hip-and-shoulder to the head, sparking an all-in brawl before the players left the field for half-time. With the scores tied at 7.3 (45) apiece, Wallace was pleased with the performance and with the frustration that it was evidently causing the Essendon players.

=== Third quarter ===
Essendon attacked from the first centre bounce, with Gary Moorcroft having two early chances but only managing one behind, while Jason Johnson kicked another behind. The teams traded behinds for a while, and Brad Johnson made a retaliatory strike to the back of John Barnes' head in a marking contest, although no further incident was sparked by it. The Bulldogs then kicked the first two goals of the quarter, with Garlick winning a free kick in the forward pocket and Bartlett kicking a goal on a running rebound play, to open a ten-point advantage after four consecutive goals.

Thereafter, Essendon controlled the quarter. Fletcher kicked his third goal from a 45m set shot – the equal-most goals he ever kicked in a game over his 400-game career – while Bewick kicked a goal from a 40m set shot after a phase of passing play in the forward line, Jason Johnson kicked his second goal after a mark in the goal square, and Justin Blumfield kicked a goal after a spectacular pack mark 40m from goal. At three-quarter time, Essendon 11.7 (73) led the Bulldogs 9.4 (58) by 15 points.

=== Final quarter ===
Essendon kicked the opening goal of the final quarter after Blumfield won a contested mark in the forward pocket and after another behind extended the margin to a game-high 22 points and had scored the last five goals of the game, but at this point the Bulldogs fought back. Wallace later commented that as the game had been played by Essendon winning the ball and attacking, the Bulldogs could stay back in zone defense; this played into a fatigue advantage to the Bulldogs. Additionally, three injuries to Essendon players (Hardwick went off with an ankle injury in the first quarter, Dean Rioli went off with a shoulder injury in the final quarter, and Jason Johnson had been hobbled for much of the game) also worked to the Bulldogs' favour. The Bulldogs then had the best of the final ten minutes of the game to fight back. Chris Grant kicked his first goal of the game straight out of a ruck contest, and then Steven Kolyniuk kicked two goals to narrow the margin to just five points – the first coming when he took a kick on Trent Bartlett's behalf after he went off the ground with the blood rule after a strong mark just outside the goal square, and the second from his own mark. Several subsequent chances were then missed, with Paul Hudson kicking three behinds from the forward pockets (he kicked 0.4 for the game) and Brad Johnson hitting the post from a 40m set shot, narrowing the margin from five points to one.

With two minutes remaining and the margin one point, Nathan Eagleton took a wide-angle set shot which went across the face of goal and fell in the right forward pocket; and, in the ground contest that followed, Essendon full-back Dustin Fletcher accidentally toe-poked the ball out of bounds on the full; from the free kick, Grant ran around on the angle and kicked the goal to put the Bulldogs five points ahead. Essendon made one final attack towards its full-forward, Matthew Lloyd, but Bulldogs defender Matthew Croft won the contest. The Bulldogs rebounded from the ensuing contests, and the siren sounded as Rohan Smith marked in the Bulldogs' forward line; his after-the-siren kick extended the final margin to 11 points. When the final siren sounded, Brad Johnson made a direct line to hurl abuse at John Barnes, before he and the other players shook hands in the usual way.

=== Details ===
Round 21, 2000
Friday, 28 July (7:40 pm) | Essendon | def. by | Western Bulldogs | Colonial Stadium (crowd: 45,725)
3.2 (20); 7.3 (45); 11.7 (73); 12.9 (81) | Q1; Q2; Q3; Final | 4.1 (25); 7.3 (45); 9.4 (58); 14.8 (92) | Umpires: Sheehan, McLaren, McInerney; Television broadcast: Seven Network
Fletcher 3, Lloyd 2, Blumfield 2, M. Johnson, Mercuri, Bewick, Ramanauskas, Alessio | Goals | Kolynuik 3, Grant 2, Garlick 2, B. Johnson 2, Smith, Eagleton, Brown, Bartlett, Liberatore
Fletcher, J. Johnson, Misiti, Long, M. Johnson, Blumfield | Best | Grant, Romero, Brown, Wynd, B. Johnson, Cox
Essendon's loss broke a twenty-game winning streak, the equal second-longest such streak in VFL/AFL history.; Essendon's score of 12.9 (81) was its lowest score since Round 15, 1999 – a streak of 29 games.

| Brownlow Medal votes |
3 S. West (Western Bulldogs); 2 M. Johnson (Essendon); 1 T. Liberatore (Western Bulldogs)

== Aftermath ==
Essendon rebounded from its defeat, defeating Collingwood its final match of the home-and-away season to finish on top of the ladder with a 21–1 record, and proceeded to win its three finals matches, including the grand final when it defeated Melbourne by 60 points, to win its record-tying 16th VFL/AFL premiership. The club's overall 24–1 record set and, as of 2025, holds the record as the best for a completed season in VFL/AFL history, breaking the previous record of 19–1 set by Carlton (1908), Collingwood (1929) and Essendon (1950).

The win secured the Western Bulldogs' place in the 2000 finals series. The Bulldogs lost the final match of the home-and-away season to finish seventh on the ladder, and subsequently lost its elimination final against the Brisbane Lions at the Gabba. The club struggled in the ensuing years, with Wallace resigning as coach with one round remaining in the 2002 season, followed by claiming the wooden spoon in 2003.

The win was one of two upset victories which established Terry Wallace's reputation as a master tactician across his coaching career. In the second, which came in round 8, 2006, when Wallace was coaching at Richmond, he orchestrated an upset victory against the top-of-the-ladder Adelaide Crows, using a low-risk, short-passing and tempo strategy designed to counteract the heavy defensive zones and Super-Flood style floods which Adelaide was then routinely employing. The two victories are often considered the defining moments of Wallace's coaching career. Defensive strategies in general became more common in the AFL in the years following the Super-Flood game, with spare defenders and strong defensive zones becoming regular strategies within a few years.

== See also ==
- 2000 AFL season
- Richmond v Adelaide (2006 AFL season)
