= Richmond v Adelaide (2006 AFL season) =

2006 AFL Round 8

Richmond	Adelaide
10.9 (69)	9.12 (66)
	1	2	3	4
RICH	3.0 (18)	6.3 (39)	7.7 (49)	10.9 (69)
ADEL	2.4 (16)	3.6 (24)	4.8 (32)	9.12 (66)
- Date: Saturday, 20 May (2:10pm)
- Stadium: Telstra Dome
- Attendance: 24,461

Broadcast in Australia
- Network: Network Ten

In round 8, 2006, an Australian Football League home-and-away match was played between Richmond and Adelaide at Telstra Dome in Melbourne on 20 May 2006. The match is famous for its tactical battle, in which the out-of-form Richmond implemented a strategy of extreme possession retention through short kicks and uncontested marks to record an upset victory against the top-of-the-ladder Adelaide by three points.

== Background ==
From 2005 to 2006, Adelaide (the Crows) under coach Neil Craig was one of the AFL's best teams, as minor premiers in 2005 and preliminary finalists both years. Richmond (the Tigers), under coach Terry Wallace, was middle-of-the-road over the same period, finishing 12th in 2005 and 9th in 2006. Entering their round 8, 2006 encounter, Adelaide was atop the ladder with a 6–1 record and the league's best percentage; Richmond was badly out of form, its flattering 3–4 record including three narrow wins against eventual bottom four teams, two losses by more than 100 points (including in the previous round against the reigning premiers Sydney), and the league's worst percentage. Adelaide's team was much more experienced than Richmond's, with an average age of 26.6 years against Richmond's 23.6 years, and only one player under 22 years old compared with Richmond's nine. Richmond hadn't beaten Adelaide since 1999, an eight-game losing-streak. Consequently, Adelaide was an overwhelming favourite, attracting odds of $1.11 for the win against Richmond's $5.75.

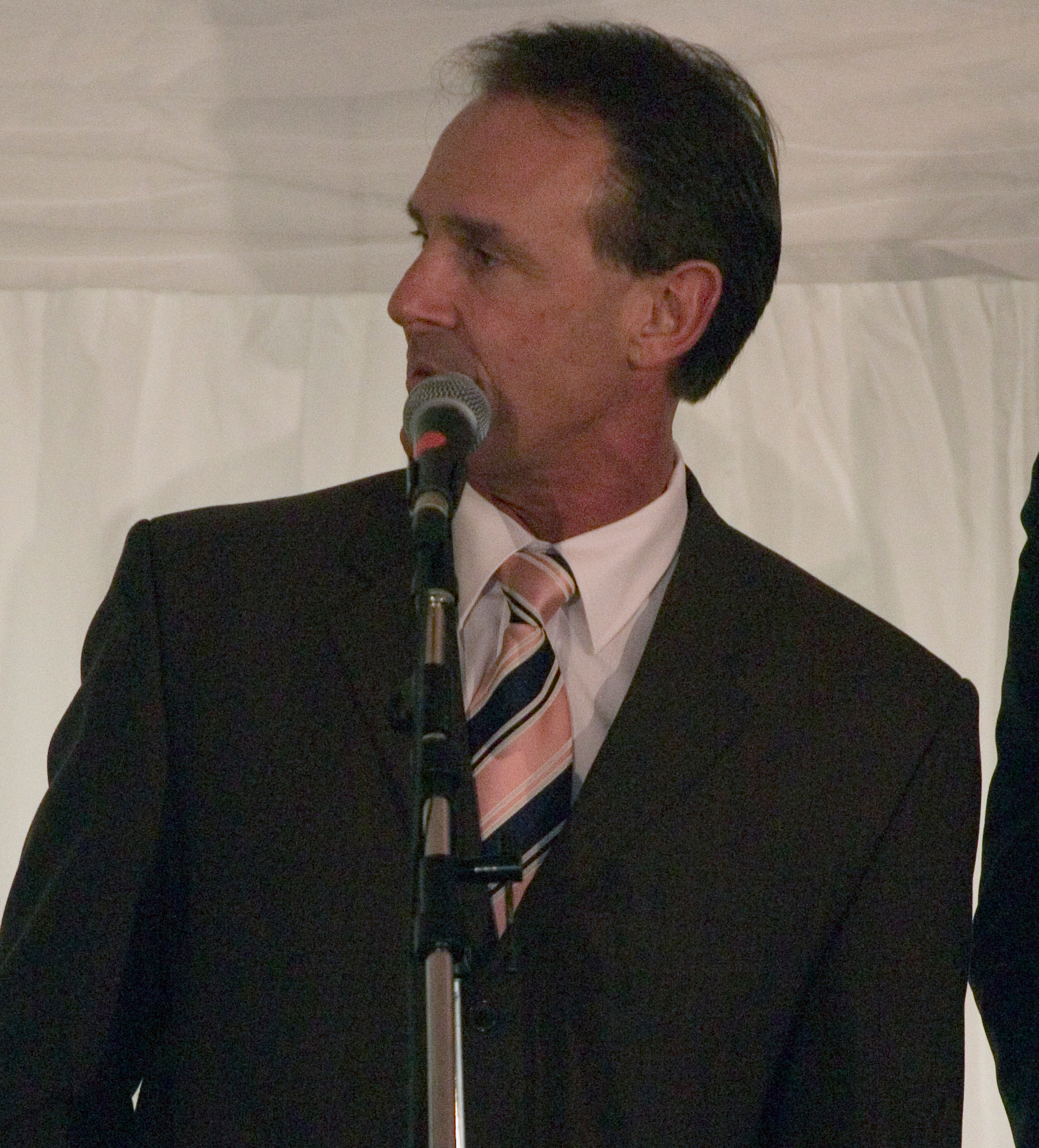
Richmond coach Terry Wallace implemented extreme tactics against Adelaide.

Adelaide's success was built on a defense-and-counterattack gameplan, which was novel at the time: it would drop its wingmen and half-forwards back into a strong zone through its defensive half and flood its backline, then focus on advancing and scoring quickly after winning defensive half turnovers. To counteract this, Wallace directed his team to adopt an extreme low-risk gameplan: to make short and uncontested kicks, as a means of advancing the ball but also backwards if necessary, to avoid making long kicks into Adelaide's zone. This was designed to minimise Adelaide's rebound opportunities, then encourage Adelaide to drop out of its defensive zone to play man-on-man, thereby opening up more long passing options – Wallace described it as "fishing", to lure the Adelaide players back to the ball. This was a drastic change for Richmond, which typically played free-flowing run-and-carry football. The plan also included elements of tempo football a tactic of retaining possession without intent to score as a means of slowing down the game to stifle a stronger opponent's momentum; Wallace had in particular planned to do this in the third quarter to set up a fourth quarter arm wrestle, noting that his less experienced team would be more likely to win over three quarters than four. The tactics weren't new ideas – indeed, Adelaide had famously pioneered them at times in its round 1, 2006 win against Collingwood – but Wallace planned a more extreme implementation than had previously been seen.

== Match summary ==
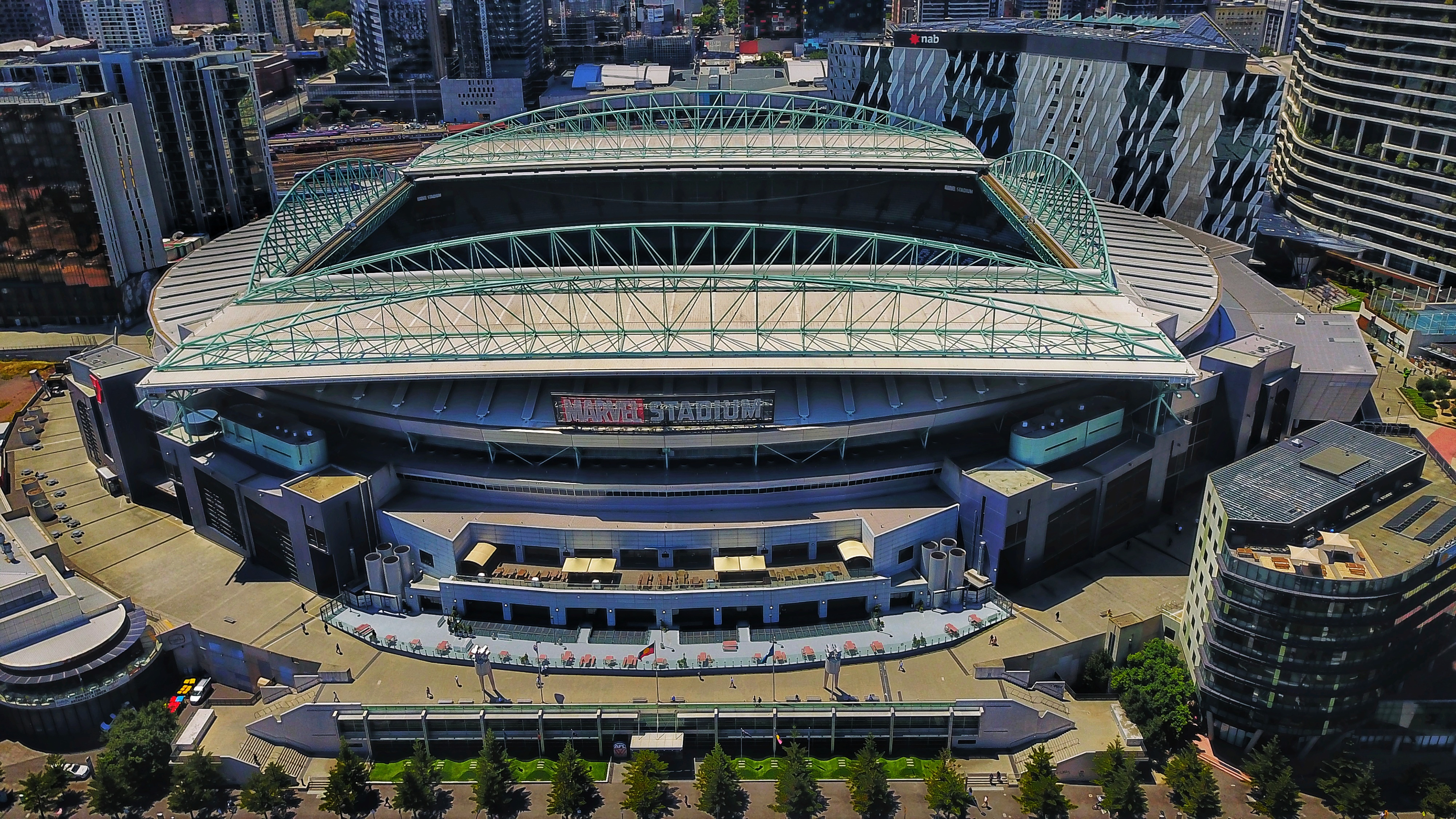
Match venue Telstra Dome.

The match was played at Telstra Dome with the retractable roof open. It was one of three Richmond home games at the venue for the season, its usual home ground being the Melbourne Cricket Ground. The attendance was 24,461, Richmond's lowest home attendance for the year. Richmond was captained by Matthew Richardson for the 15th and final time of his career, in the absence of appointed captain Kane Johnson. Adelaide wore its red clash guernsey.

=== First quarter ===
Richmond kicked the first goal from the opening centre clearance, Richard Tambling converting a 35m set shot from the left boundary line. Adelaide had the best of the chances over the next ten minutes, but managed only two behinds. In the 10th minute, an errant Adelaide rebound was intercepted by Richmond's Shane Tuck, who converted a 30m set shot goal. The ensuing centre clearance was won by Richmond to Troy Simmonds, who kicked a goal with a 60m bomb and gave Richmond a 16-point lead after 12 minutes. Richmond had already begun implementing its short passing gameplan, with 21 marks in the first ten minutes.

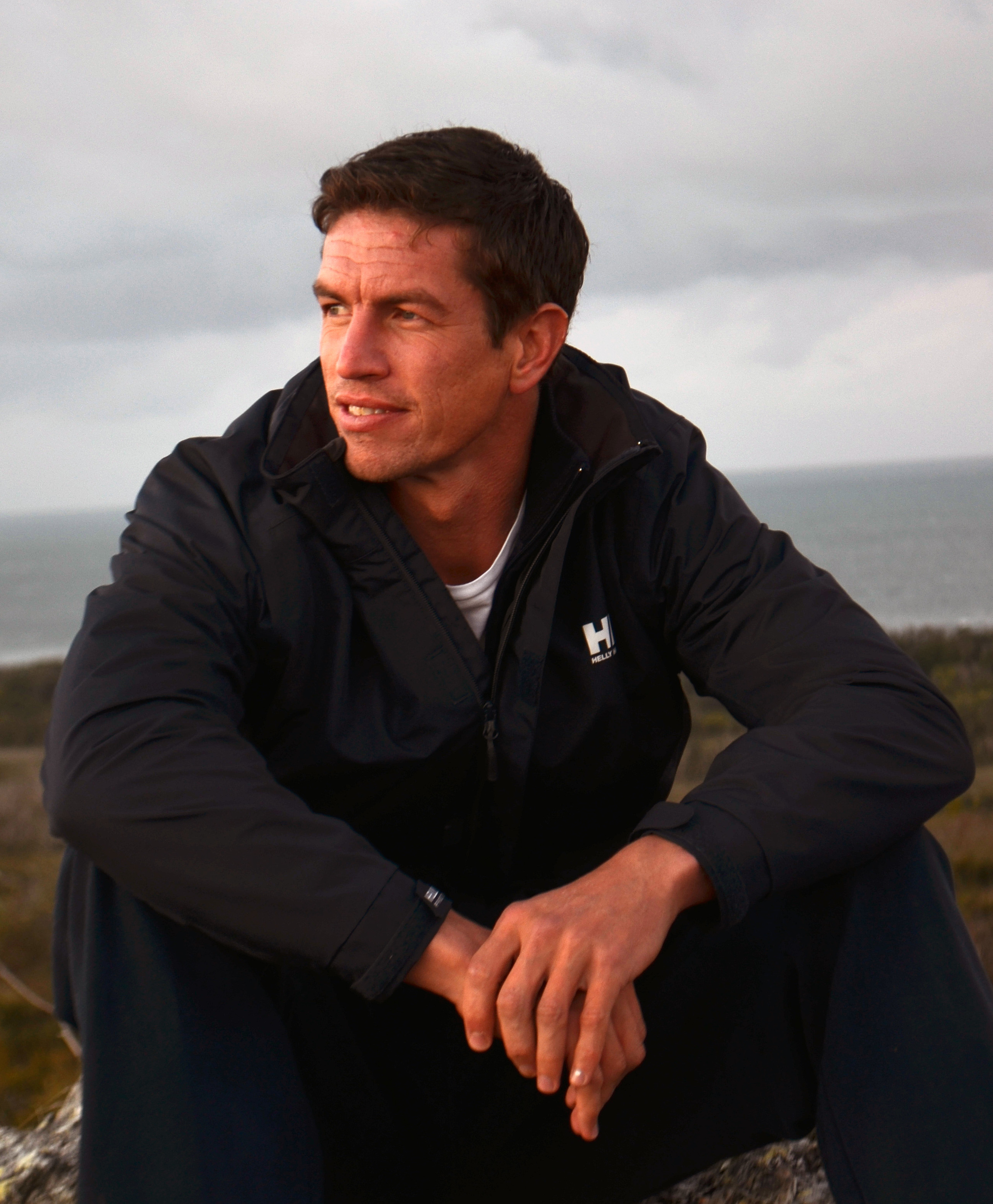
Ruckman Troy Simmonds was dominant with eleven first quarter disposals.

Adelaide began to find success with its typical zone-and-rebound gameplan in the second half of the quarter, managing behinds from fast rebounds in the 14th and 17th minutes. Adelaide's first goal came in the 18th minute, after Simmonds conceded a free kick when defending a kick-in; Martin Mattner kicked the goal from a 45m set shot. Three minutes later, Tyson Edwards kicked Adelaide's second goal on the run from 50m, to narrow the margin to two points. Adelaide had several more chances, but Richmond prevented further score, including: a snap by Graeme Johncock which was marked by Simmonds in the goal square; three dangerous turnovers on the wing which were all nullified by strong Richmond tackles and holding the ball free kicks; and a 30m set shot after the siren by Kris Massie which went out of bounds on the full. At quarter time, Richmond led 3.0 (18) to 2.4 (16) by two points.

Richmond ruckman Troy Simmonds was particularly influential in the first quarter with 11 disposals, but Adelaide's zone and swarming rebound was dangerous. Veteran Adelaide defender Ben Hart left the game with a fractured wrist in the 23rd minute. Communications between Richmond's coaches' box and bench had failed during the quarter, and were restored during the quarter time break.

=== Second quarter ===
Richmond kicked two behinds in the first three minutes – Troy Simmonds from the opening centre clearance, whose shot was touched on the line, and Matthew Richardson who hit the post from 45m – before Johncock kicked a goal on the run after two bounces in the 4th minute to give Adelaide its first lead. Adelaide had the best of play during the next ten minutes, earning several repeat inside-50 entries but scoring only one behind, while Richmond's Andrew Krakouer missed an easy 15m set shot against the run of play in the 8th minute. In the 14th minute, Greg Tivendale appeared to take a mark 35m from goal for Richmond, but a miscommunication between the umpires – one had paid the mark, and one had called touched play on – meant the result was a ball-up; Richmond won the clearance from that ball-up, and Chris Newman kicked the goal to put Richmond back in front.

In the 16th minute, Trent Hentschel scored a behind for Adelaide. From the ensuing kick-in, Richmond first put the tempo element of its tactics into effect, chipping the ball short around its back half for two full minutes to the boos of the crowd; Richmond eventually advanced the ball, turning it over with its inside-50 kick. Richmond advanced quickly from its next rebound, and Andrew Krakouer finished with a 35m set shot goal in the 21st minute. Richmond won two free kicks from ensuing centre clearance and Kayne Pettifer's 45m goal put Richmond ahead by 15 points. Adelaide had two more failed scoring chances for the quarter, Mattner tackled by Newman 50m from goal before he could take his shot, and Johncock failing to score from a wide angle shot after the siren.

With three goals to one in the quarter, Richmond 6.3 (39) held a 15-point lead against Adelaide 3.6 (24). Richmond led short kicks in the second quarter 44–18, and had been effective at starving Adelaide of the rebound opportunities it generally thrived upon.

=== Third quarter ===
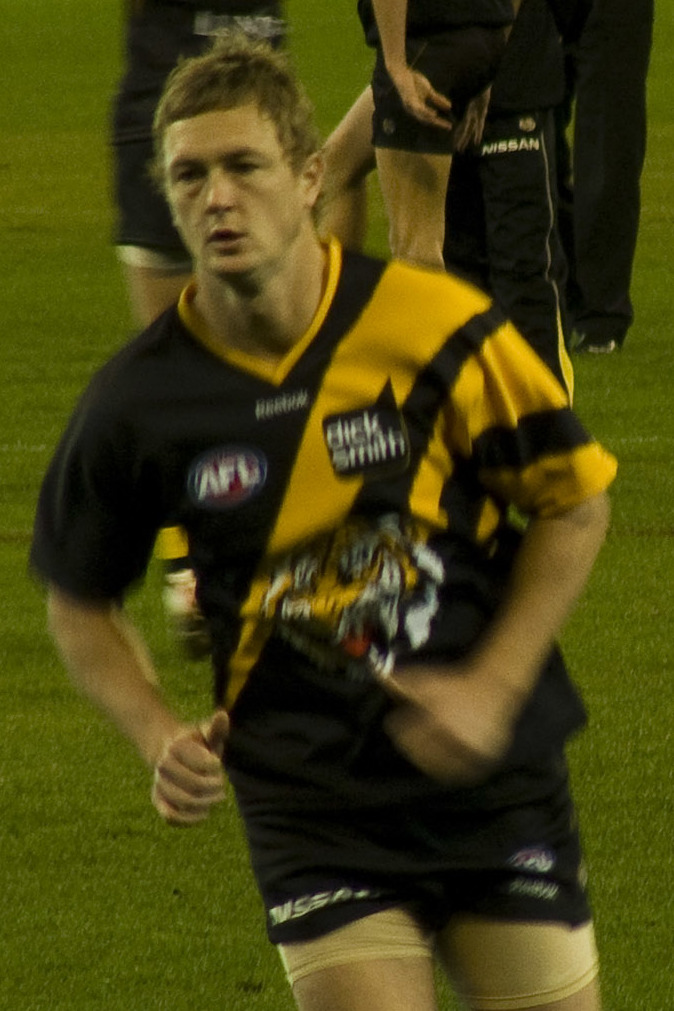
Kayne Pettifer's speckie was the highlight of a notoriously dour third quarter.

There were two goals in the first four minutes of the third quarter: Richmond won a turnover and, after seven short passes around half-forward, finished with a 40m set shot goal to Simmonds; from the ensuing centre clearance, Adelaide passed the ball to Hentschel who kicked a wide angle set shot goal from 20m.

Thereafter, the third quarter became the game's most notorious, as Richmond put its tempo gameplan into effect. After winning possession in the 7th minute, Richmond passed the ball around its backline for more than 2½ minutes before crossing the centre-line; when Richmond eventually went forward, its inside-50 kick was a turnover and Adelaide rebounded quickly, but its inside-50 ended in a spectacular intercept mark with the flight of the ball by Pettifer, which won Mark of the Round. Richmond then again short passed around the backline, before eventually picking a handball chain through the Adelaide zone to Tuck, who missed a 35m set shot. Chris Hyde missed another chance for Richmond in the 16th minute. Another two-minute period of patient possession by Richmond soon followed, ending with a wide set shot by Richardson which hit the post.

In the 23rd minute, Adelaide thought it had scored its fifth goal when Brett Burton snapped the ball through from a forward 50 stoppage, but it was touched off the boot by Pettifer for a behind. Richmond advanced from the kick-in to Trent Knobel, whose shot after the three-quarter time siren hit the post. After one goal apiece for the quarter, Richmond 7.7 (49) led Adelaide 4.8 (32).

The third quarter saw both teams remain disciplined to their own gameplans – Adelaide hanging back in its zone and waiting to create turnovers, and Richmond refusing to kick into that zone – resulting in a stalemate, one which Richmond was happy to allow given it was defending a three-goal lead. Richmond led the short kicks 57–20 for the quarter, and the quarter lasted only 23:54 due to the lack of scoring and stoppages. Joel Bowden, who was consistently left unmanned at full back as Adelaide settled into its zone defense, directed much of Richmond's play and was frequently used as a safe option by Richmond for easy retention of possession.

=== Final quarter ===
Entering the final quarter, Adelaide made defensive adjustments by manning up Richmond's loose defenders and making its tempo game more difficult to execute; but both teams continued to flood men behind the ball, and Richmond maintained a short-passing game with fewer backwards kicks as its primary means of ball movement.

The first centre clearance was won by Richmond, ending with Tivendale whose running shot after only 17 seconds hit the post. Adelaide attacked, and Mark Ricciuto missed a 15m wide angle set shot from a free kick in the 3rd minute. Richmond then again held possession and advanced the ball slowly for 2½ minutes, finishing with a set shot goal to Mark Coughlan which extended the margin to a game-high 23 points in the 7th minute.

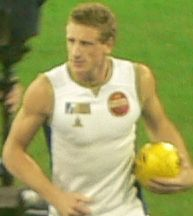
Brett Burton's final goal brought Adelaide within three points of Richmond.

Adelaide's defensive adjustments then began to deliver rewards. Richmond's next short rebound attempt was intercepted, ultimately resulting in a behind to Mattner from a 25m set shot. Following the subsequent kick-in, Richmond's Brett Deledio's attempted a backwards pass to a doubly-manned Patrick Bowden at full back, which was easily turned over and resulted in a walk-in goal to Andrew McLeod in the 10th minute, narrowing the margin to 15 points.

Thereafter followed a relatively rapid sequence of scores, mostly from centre clearances. Adelaide won the first centre clearance by a holding-the-ball free kick, and Hentschel kicked a 20m set shot goal. Richmond responded immediately from the next centre clearance, Adam Pattison kicking the goal from a 35m set shot. Richmond dropped Matthew Richardson into defense to further flood the backline; he soon committed a turnover trying to clear the defensive 50m arc, resulting in a goal to Burton in the 16th minute. From the following centre clearance, Deledio kicked a goal from a 60m bomb, restoring Richmond's 15 point lead in the 18th minute. The next centre clearance went to Adelaide and ended in a behind, and Richmond's attempt to go coast-to-coast from the kick-in ended when Andrew McLeod caught Richmond's Danny Meyer holding the ball 25m from Richmond's goal.

In the 23rd minute, a fast rebound by Adelaide ended with a mark to Mark Ricciuto 50m from goal, who wheeled around and kicked a goal to narrow the margin to eight points. Pattison managed to run down Burton for a holding the ball free kick to prevent Adelaide attacking from the subsequent centre clearance; this possession allowed Richmond to take another two minutes off the clock by passing around its forward half, ending with a behind from a set shot by Deledio in the 26th minute. One minute later, after rebounding from centre half-back, Burton kicked a goal on the run from 40m to narrow the margin to three points with about 1:20 remaining on the game clock. Richmond won the ensuing centre clearance and, after securing a mark in its forward-line, ran out the rest of the clock.

With five goals in final quarter after its change of tactics, Adelaide scored more goals in the last twenty minutes of the match than in the first eighty minutes. But Richmond's lead and critical goals from final quarter centre clearances were enough for it to hold on for the win. Richmond 10.9 (69) defeated Adelaide 9.12 (66).

=== Overall ===
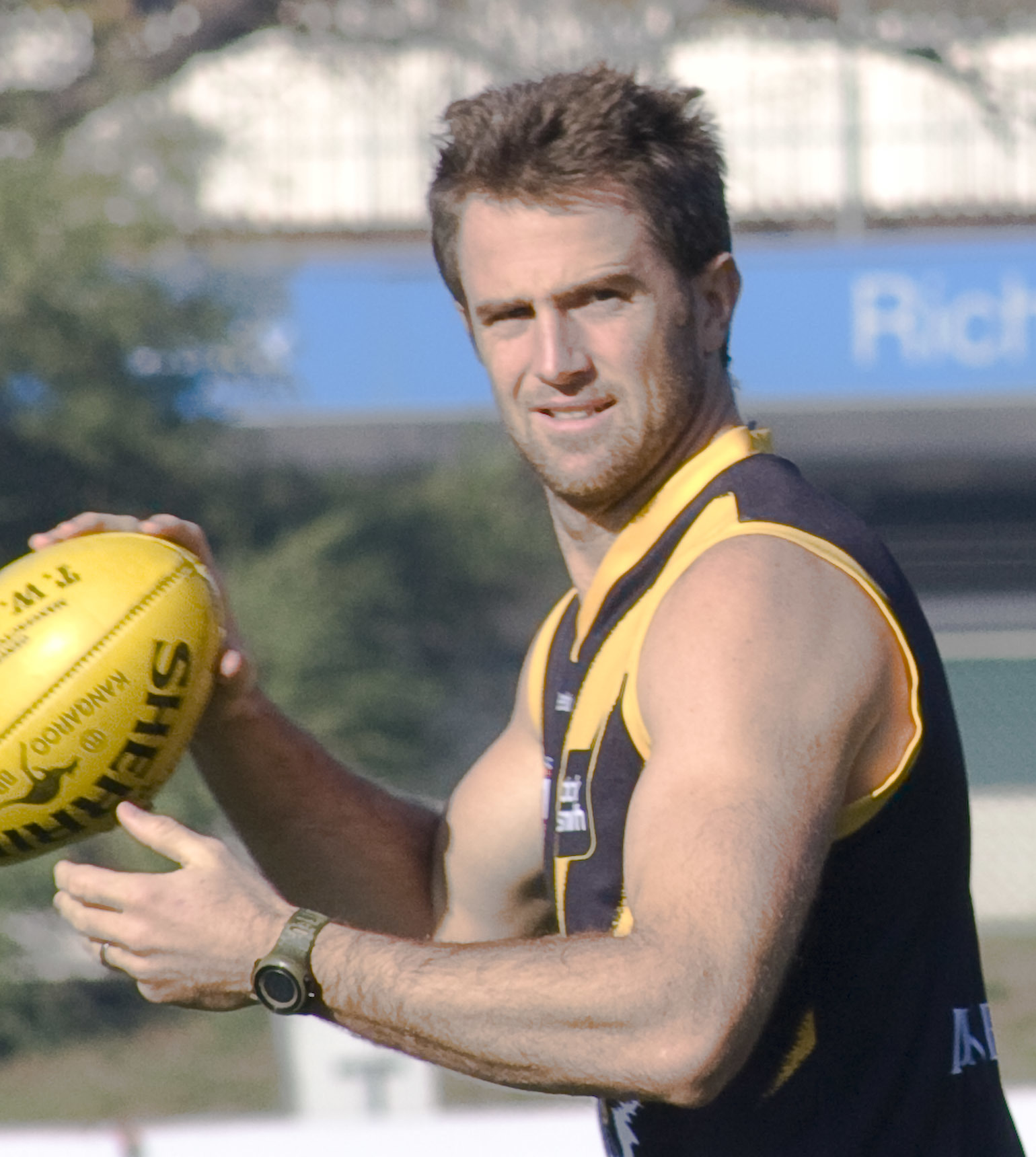
Joel Bowden was the leading possession getter executing Richmond's plans.

The effectiveness of Richmond's short passing and tempo tactics dominated post-match analysis. Richmond recorded a VFL/AFL record of 181 marks, surpassing the previous record of 170; the record still stands as of 2024. 13 of Richmond's marks were contested. Richmond finished with 159 short kicks compared with its average of 80, highlighting the drastic shift in tactics which Richmond had implemented in the upset win. Neil Craig commented he had never seen a team retain possession for such long periods.

Richmond's defenders, who executed the gameplan diligently despite the boos of the crowd and were effective at nullifying the Adelaide forwards, figured prominently among the best on ground. Full back Joel Bowden, who was playing his 200th game, had 34 disposals, 20 marks and led the organisation of the backline, and was considered best on ground by sportswriters in the Age and Herald Sun. Andrew Kellaway (23 disposals, 15 marks), was second-best in both newspapers and received the three Brownlow Medal votes. Andrew Raines, who had 20 disposals, 10 marks and kept Adelaide midfielder-forward Mark Ricciuto to only four disposals, was also among both newspapers' votes; and Patrick Bowden (28 disposals, 15 marks) and Dean Polo (effective on Brett Burton) also drew praise.

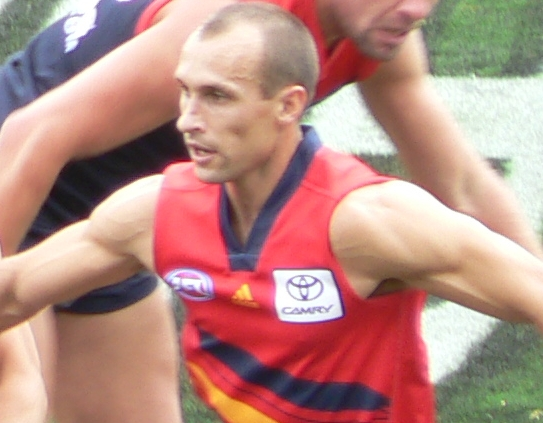
Tyson Edwards was Adelaide's best in the losing effort.

In a low stoppage game which saw only 40 total clearances compared with the league average of 63, Richmond unexpectedly dominated those clearances 26–14, which was both Richmond's best clearance differential and Adelaide's worst clearance differential for the season. Five of Richmond's ten goals came from centre clearances. This drew little attention at the time of the game, and Terry Wallace believed that his midfielders' performances had been underrated and that the uncontested strategy could not have worked without being supported by midfield success and strong tackling. Ruckman Troy Simmonds, with 9 hitouts, 24 disposals, two goals and often dropping back to aid the defence, received two Brownlow Medal votes and was the only Richmond midfielder rated among the best by sportswriters at the time; but later assessments gave strong credit to Richmond's young midfielders including Andrew Krakouer (24 disposals, 5 clearances), Nathan Foley (3 clearances), Chris Hyde (17 disposals) and Brett Deledio (20 disposals, 4 inside-50s) for their work against the more fancied opposition.

Adelaide's game was widely seen as poor by its standards. Craig lamenting its execution was below its usual standards and that it had lacked the patience to handle Richmond's unusual tactics. Midfielder Tyson Edwards (30 disposals) was Adelaide's best player, earning one Brownlow Medal vote and figuring among both newspapers' votes. Adelaide's forward opportunities were stifled and squandered: Mark Ricciuto had only four disposals, Ken McGregor scored 0.2 with most of his shots coming from long range and falling short, and Trent Hentschel was inaccurate with 2.3 from the best close-range shots of any forward.

=== Scoreboard ===
Round 8, 2006
Saturday, 20 May(2:10 pm)	Richmond	def.	Adelaide	Telstra Dome (crowd: 24,461)
3.0 (18); 6.3 (39); 7.7 (49); 10.9 (69)	Q1; Q2; Q3; Final	2.4 (16); 3.6 (24); 4.8 (32); 9.12 (66)	Umpires: Donlon, McInerney, Quigley; Television broadcast: Network Ten
Simmonds 2, Coughlan, Deledio, Krakouer, Newman, Pattison, Pettifer, Tambling, Tuck	Goals	Burton 2, Hentschel 2, Edwards, Johncock, Mattner, McLeod, Ricciuto
J. Bowden, P. Bowden, Kellaway, Simmonds, Raines, Polo, Deledio, Krakouer	Best	Edwards, McLeod, Massie, Goodwin
Injuries	Hart (wrist)

Brownlow Medal votes
3 A. Kellaway (Richmond); 2 T. Simmonds (Richmond); 1 T. Edwards (Adelaide)

== Reception ==
"I've never seen a game of football played like this... and I'm excited by it because it's different and it's proving very effective for the Tigers."

"I'm excited, Wallsy; I hope I never see another one played like this."

— Network Ten commentators Robert Walls and Anthony Hudson offered differing viewpoints during their third quarter coverage.

Richmond's tactics drew polarising reactions. Wallace received a lot of credit for developing a gameplan which worked, but there were many negative views on the spectacle. Journalist Rohan Connolly commented "the third term in particular was as close to unwatchable a spectacle as the modern game has ever come,". Essendon coach Kevin Sheedy described it as 'basketball crap' and questioned its value as a tactic for developing the team with the comment "if [Wallace] wants to play a game of billiards up the back, then good luck to him. You win four points but you will never go anywhere."

In broader context, the game was played during a time when defensive tactics, flooding and tempo football were first achieving prevalence and success, in particular through Adelaide and Sydney as the 2005 minor and major premiers. There was already a view that such tactics would negatively impact the attractiveness of the game and drive away fans; indeed, Richmond's play drew boos from the crowd, and Wallace commented that he knew "those concerned about the aesthetics of the game would be calling for blood". During the first half of its 2005 premiership winning season, Sydney copped plenty of criticism for its "unattractive" style of play, particularly in a defeat against St Kilda in round 10 which proved to be the turning point in the club's season. There was even a rule change already undergoing serious trials in the Victorian Football League premiership season, under which marks would not be paid for backwards kicks in a team's defensive half, something which would have made Richmond's gameplan impossible to implement (it was ultimately rejected for national implementation). However, the lasting view was that Richmond's extreme tactics were successful primarily due to their surprise factor and Adelaide's unpreparedness and inflexibility to counter them, rather than their inherent effectiveness, and few considered it likely that such tactics could succeed against a team which had prepared for them.

The win consolidated Terry Wallace's reputation as a master tactician. Wallace had already orchestrated one of the decade's most famous tactical upset victories as coach of the Western Bulldogs in 2000, when he employed a 14-man defensive "Super-Flood" to inflict Essendon's sole loss for the year; these tactics were not dissimilar to Adelaide's standard tactics in 2006, but were unheard of in 2000. The Richmond vs Adelaide match was quickly compared with the Super-Flood by journalists, and the two victories are often considered the defining moments of Wallace's coaching career. It has also been ranked one of Richmond's greatest modern home-and-away victories.

== Teams ==
Richmond
B:	4 Andrew Raines	19 Joel Bowden	1 Chris Newman
HB:	33 Brent Hartigan	39 Andrew Kellaway	32 Greg Tivendale
C:	31 Chris Hyde	41 Nathan Foley	3 Brett Deledio
HF:	22 Danny Meyer	12 Matthew Richardson (c)	15 Kayne Pettifer
F:	27 Andrew Krakouer	16 Patrick Bowden	30 Richard Tambling
Foll:	5 Troy Simmonds	24 Mark Coughlan	21 Shane Tuck
Int:	13 Trent Knobel	14 Dean Polo	23 Daniel Jackson
Int:	26 Adam Pattison		
Coach:	Terry Wallace		

Adelaide
B:	8 Nathan Bassett	25 Ben Rutten	34 Ben Hart
HB:	18 Graeme Johncock	27 Scott Stevens	11 Michael Doughty
C:	39 Martin Mattner	36 Simon Goodwin	33 Brent Reilly
HF:	5 Scott Thompson	16 Ken McGregor	23 Andrew McLeod
F:	24 Brett Burton	37 Trent Hentschel	9 Tyson Edwards
Foll:	35 Rhett Biglands	12 Robert Shirley	32 Mark Ricciuto (c)
Int:	3 Kris Massie	4 Matthew Clarke	7 Nathan van Berlo
Int:	10 Matthew Bode		
Coach:	Neil Craig		

== See also ==
- 2006 AFL season
- Essendon v Western Bulldogs (2000 AFL season)
- 2017 AFL Grand Final
