= Terry Wallace =

Australian rules footballer, born 1958

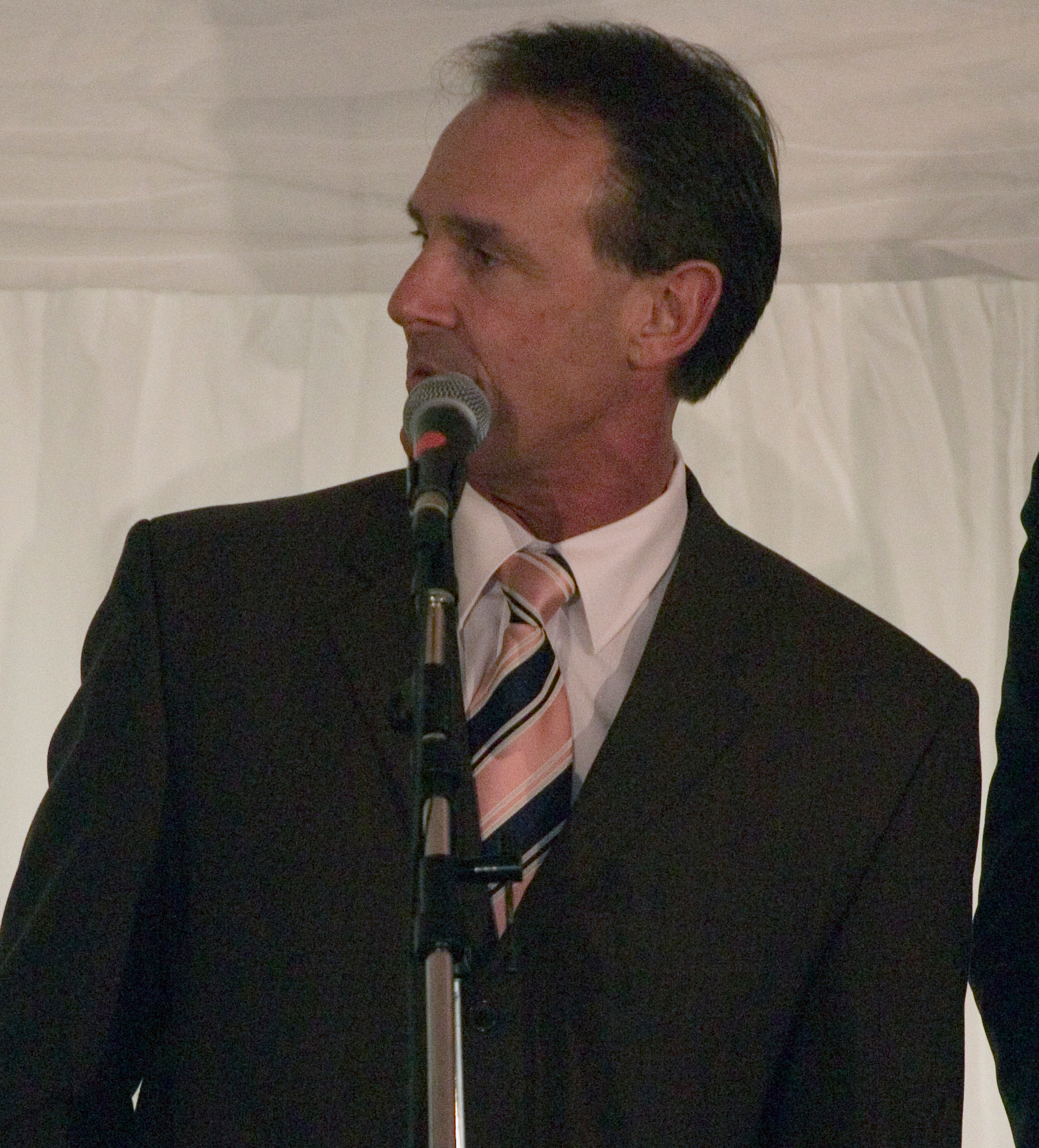

Personal information
- Full name: Terry Wallace
- Nickname: Plough
- Born: 13 December 1958 (age 67); Victoria
- Original team: Camberwell (VFA)
- Position: Midfielder

Playing career^{1}
Years	Club	Games (Goals)
1978–1986	Hawthorn	174 (96)
1987	Richmond	11 (7)
1988–1991	Footscray	69 (20)
Total		254 (123)

Coaching career
Years	Club	Games (W–L–D)
1996–2002	Western Bulldogs	148 (79–67–2)
2005–2009	Richmond	99 (37–60–2)
Total		247 (116–127–4)
- ^{1} Playing statistics correct to the end of 1991.

Career highlights
- 3× VFL premiership player: 1978, 1983, 1986; 2× Peter Crimmins Perpetual Memorial Trophy: 1981, 1983; 2× Charles Sutton Medal: 1988, 1989; All-Australian team (player): 1988; All-Australian team (coach): 1998; VFL Team of the Year: 1982, 1983; Australian Football Hall of Fame

Terry Wallace (born 13 December 1958) is a former professional Australian rules football player and coach.

As a player, his career spanned three VFL/AFL clubs; most notably Hawthorn where he played in three premierships. After one season with Richmond, he then played with Footscray Football Club where he earned two Best and Fairest awards. He also achieved one All-Australian selection when representing the VFA at the 1988 National Carnival.

As coach, he took the Western Bulldogs from 15th in 1996 to 3rd when he featured in the documentary Year of the Dogs a position in which the club held in 1997 and 1998 during which he was named coach of the All-Australian team. Wallace's coaching style is considered to be innovative and he is credited with having started the modern practice of sides warming up on the field before a match. However Wallace's coaching career at Richmond between 2005 and 2009 was not so successful, and he stepped down from coaching in June 2009.

His son, Brent Wallace, is currently a field umpire in the AFL.

== Playing career ==
=== Hawthorn ===
Wallace was a centreman for Hawthorn Football Club from 1978 until 1986, where he played a total number of 174 games for the club and kicked a total of 96 goals. Recruited from VFA club Camberwell, he was a member of Hawthorn's 1978 premiership side in what was his debut season. Nicknamed 'Plough' for his knack of crashing through packs, Wallace was Hawthorn's best and fairest winner in 1981 and 1983. In 1983, Wallace was member of the Hawthorn premiership side. He played in one further premiership side at Hawthorn in 1986. Often polling well in the Brownlow Medal counts, Wallace finished equal third in 1982 and equal sixth in 1983.

=== Richmond ===
After a contractual dispute with Hawthorn at the end of 1986, Wallace received a clearance to move to the Richmond Football Club but struggled in his only season with the club in 1987, where he played a total number of 11 games for the club and kicked a total of 7 goals. Wallace eventually ended the year prematurely with a back injury.

=== Footscray ===
He finished his playing career with four seasons at Footscray from 1988 until 1991 for a total of 69 games and kicked 20 goals, which yielded back to back Charles Sutton Medals in 1988 and 1989.

== Coaching career ==
=== Western Bulldogs ===
In the middle of the 1996 AFL season, he took over as the Western Bulldogs senior coach, following the sacking of incumbent senior coach Alan Joyce. At the end of the 1996 season, they finished 15th. In the 1997 season, Wallace quickly rebuilt the side, finishing third at the end of the season. In the first qualifying final they defeated Sydney but then lost in the preliminary final to Adelaide. In 1998, the Bulldogs under Wallace finished second at the end of the season. In the qualifying finals, they defeated the West Coast Eagles but lost in the preliminary final to Adelaide for the second year in a row.

In the 1999 AFL season, Wallace led the Bulldogs to fourth at the end of the season but in the qualifying finals they lost to West Coast then in the semi-finals they lost to the Brisbane Lions. In the 2000 AFL season the Bulldogs under Wallace finished seventh but in the elimination finals they were knocked out by the Brisbane Lions. During this season the Bulldogs were the only team to defeat Essendon in a match that became known as the "Super-Flood" as Wallace employed "flooding" tactics against the Essendon forwards. In the 2001 AFL season, the Bulldogs under Wallace struggled and finished tenth and then the Bulldogs under Wallace kept struggling in the 2002 season, sitting at thirteenth on the ladder with eight wins, one draw and twelve losses after Round 21, 2002. Wallace resigned as Bulldogs senior coach at the end of the 2002 season with one match left to go. Assistant coach Peter Rohde then replaced Wallace in a caretaker senior coaching role to coach the last game for the 2002 season in Round 22, 2002 against Collingwood, which the Bulldogs won and after this Rohde was eventually employed full-time senior coach.

Wallace was linked to the Sydney Swans job in mid-2002 when Rodney Eade was sacked following a narrow round 12 loss to Geelong. It was rumoured that there was a verbal agreement that the Swans would appoint him as their senior coach for the 2003 season. But Wallace was not given the Swans job and it went to then-caretaker senior coach Paul Roos, despite Wallace resigning as senior coach of the Bulldogs with one match remaining in the 2002 season.

=== Richmond ===
In August 2004, he was appointed the senior coach of Richmond for five seasons from 2005, replacing Danny Frawley.

His first year at Richmond was unsuccessful, as the club under Wallace finished twelfth at the end of the 2005 season despite spending most of the first half of the season in the top eight, mostly in the top four. In the 2006 season, Richmond under Wallace with three straight crushing defeats at the start of the season placed them at the bottom of the ladder, but they recovered to win five out of the next seven games, including a famous tactical win against the Adelaide Crows, who were on top of the AFL ladder at the time, using extreme possession retention and tempo tactics; but they did not make the finals, just missing out and finishing ninth at the end of the 2006 season.

The 2007 season proved to be Wallace's worst at any club. The Tigers lost the first five games of the season by less than 25 points and maintained leads in many of those games going into the final quarter. However, in Round 6, 2007, the Tigers were soundly defeated by the eventual premiers, Geelong, at the Telstra Dome by a record margin of 157 points. This subsequently led to the board and management formally apologizing to supporters at Wallace's "Tuesdays with Terry" press conference. Richmond under Wallace won only three games to finish sixteenth in last position on the ladder for the wooden spoon position at the end of the 2007 season.

The 2008 season was a vital year for Wallace in relation to his future at the club. Brett Deledio said that the club had to make the top eight at all costs in order to repay the faith shown by supporters. The season was a big improvement with Richmond starting off with a win over Carlton in Round 1. But the team did not make the finals with Richmond under Wallace finishing ninth at the end of the 2008 season with eleven wins, ten losses and one draw.

Mounting speculation and reports of a rift with Richmond president Gary March were reported at the conclusion of the home and away season, mainly due to conflicting assessments of the sides performance between coach and president. These issues were denied by the club and coach. The appointment of Kevin Sheedy to a marketing role at Richmond following Sheedy's departure as Essendon Football club senior coach also resulted in more pressure on Wallace to deliver the Tigers a much overdue finals appearance in 2009.

At the start of the 2009 season, Wallace was still under pressure after Richmond's 83-point loss against Carlton in Round 1 and further losses to Geelong, the Western Bulldogs and cellar-dwellers Melbourne. Despite controversial media reports describing Wallace as a 'dead man walking', he told a packed media conference after the Round 4, 2009 loss to Melbourne that he would not be resigning and would coach out the 2009 season at Richmond, the final year of his five-year contract. A subsequent Richmond Football Club board meeting gave Wallace a reprieve until mid-season before deciding his fate. However later in the 2009 season, Richmond under Wallace kept struggling and sat fifteenth (second-last) position on the ladder after Round 10, 2009 with two wins and eight losses. Wallace then announced his resignation as senior coach of Richmond Football Club on 1 June 2009, but would coach one more game. Public scrutiny aimed towards Wallace is a main factor contributing to his resignation.

Wallace's last game as senior coach of the Richmond Tigers in Round 11, 2009, resulted in a loss against the Western Bulldogs, with the final score Richmond 14.5 (89) and Western Bulldogs 24.13 (157). Assistant coach Jade Rawlings then replaced Wallace and served as caretaker senior coach for the remainder of the 2009 season.

== Media career ==
During the period from 2003 until 2004, when Wallace was not coaching, he became a prominent media personality with roles on Fox Footy channel, and as a columnist in Melbourne newspaper the Herald Sun, which he still maintains. After his coaching career ended, Wallace returned to his media career and Wallace has also worked for Fox Footy, Channel 9, Seven Network, Sky News Australia, 3AW and for the past period for SEN.

== Statistics ==
=== Playing statistics ===
Legend
G	Goals	K	Kicks	D	Disposals	T	Tackles
B	Behinds	H	Handballs	M	Marks

Season	Team	No.	Games	Totals							Averages (per game)						
Season	Team	No.	Games	G	B	K	H	D	M	T	G	B	K	H	D	M	T
1978	Hawthorn	16	25	7	8	323	128	451	52	—N/a	0.3	0.3	12.9	5.1	18.0	2.1	—N/a
1979	Hawthorn	16	21	7	7	299	113	412	41	—N/a	0.3	0.3	14.2	5.4	19.6	2.0	—N/a
1980	Hawthorn	16	3	3	3	45	24	69	6	—N/a	1.0	1.0	15.0	8.0	23.0	2.0	—N/a
1981	Hawthorn	16	22	10	17	425	135	560	54	—N/a	0.5	0.8	19.3	6.1	25.5	2.5	—N/a
1982	Hawthorn	16	22	23	22	488	147	635	89	—N/a	1.0	1.0	22.2	6.7	28.9	4.0	—N/a
1983	Hawthorn	16	25	19	19	599	166	765	81	—N/a	0.8	0.8	24.0	6.6	30.6	3.2	—N/a
1984	Hawthorn	16	12	4	11	185	83	268	23	—N/a	0.3	0.9	15.4	6.9	22.3	1.9	—N/a
1985	Hawthorn	16	23	16	15	483	186	669	71	—N/a	0.7	0.7	21.0	8.1	29.1	3.1	—N/a
1986	Hawthorn	16	21	7	10	374	239	613	67	—N/a	0.3	0.5	17.8	11.4	29.2	3.2	—N/a
1987	Richmond	16	11	7	8	171	99	270	30	19	0.6	0.7	15.5	9.0	24.5	2.7	1.7
1988	Footscray	16	21	8	5	329	185	514	52	22	0.4	0.2	15.7	8.8	24.5	2.5	1.0
1989	Footscray	16	22	3	5	379	235	614	84	28	0.1	0.2	17.2	10.7	27.9	3.8	1.3
1990	Footscray	16	22	8	11	326	289	615	89	20	0.4	0.5	14.8	13.1	28.0	4.0	0.9
1991	Footscray	16	4	1	0	40	45	85	18	9	0.3	0.0	10.0	11.3	21.3	4.5	2.3
Career			254	123	141	4466	2074	6540	757	98	0.5	0.6	17.6	8.2	25.7	3.0	1.2

=== Coaching statistics ===
Legend
W	Wins	L	Losses	D	Draws	W%	Winning percentage	LP	Ladder position	LT	League teams

Season	Team	Games	W	L	D	W %	LP	LT
1996	Footscray	10	3	7	0	30.0%	15	16
1997	Western Bulldogs	24	15	9	0	62.5%	3	16
1998	Western Bulldogs	24	16	8	0	66.7%	2	16
1999	Western Bulldogs	24	15	8	1	64.6%	4	16
2000	Western Bulldogs	23	12	11	0	52.2%	7	16
2001	Western Bulldogs	22	10	12	0	45.5%	10	16
2002	Western Bulldogs	21	8	12	1	40.5%	12	16
2005	Richmond	22	10	12	0	45.5%	12	16
2006	Richmond	22	11	11	0	50.0%	9	16
2007	Richmond	22	3	18	1	15.9%	16	16
2008	Richmond	22	11	10	1	52.3%	9	16
2009	Richmond	11	2	9	0	18.2%	15	16
Career totals		247	116	127	4	47.8%		
