= Paul Hudson (footballer) =

Australian rules footballer (born 1970)

Personal information
- Full name: Paul Hudson
- Born: 20 July 1970 (age 56)
- Original team: Hobart
- Height: 185 cm (6 ft 1 in)
- Weight: 88 kg (194 lb)

Playing career^{1}
Years	Club	Games (Goals)
1990–1996	Hawthorn	134 (264)
1997–2001	Western Bulldogs	108 (214)
2002	Richmond	3 (1)
Total		245 (479)
- ^{1} Playing statistics correct to the end of 2002.

Career highlights
- AFL Premiership player: 1991; All-Australian team: 1998; Western Bulldogs leading Goalkicker: 1998, 1999

Paul Hudson (born 20 July 1970) is a former Australian rules footballer who played for Hawthorn, the Western Bulldogs and Richmond in the Australian Football League (AFL). He currently serves as a development coach with St Kilda and as the senior coach of Victorian Football League club Sandringham. Paul Hudson is also currently the Yarra Valley Grammar head coach in the AGSV competition.

== Playing career ==
In 1990, Hudson followed in the footsteps of his father Peter Hudson and joined Hawthorn, where played until the end of the 1996 season. A half forward, he kicked 264 goals in his seven seasons at the club, averaging nearly 38 goals a year. In 1991, in just his second year of AFL football, he finished fifth in the Brownlow Medal and kicked two goals in Hawthorn's grand final victory. In the 1992 pre-season competition, he won the first-ever Michael Tuck Medal for his performance in the grand final. He was traded to the Western Bulldogs for the 1997 season and earned All-Australian selection in 1998. He was on-traded to Richmond at the end of 2001 and only managed three games before retiring in 2002.

== Statistics ==
Legend
G	Goals	K	Kicks	D	Disposals	T	Tackles
B	Behinds	H	Handballs	M	Marks

Season	Team	No.	Games	Totals							Averages (per game)							Votes
Season	Team	No.	Games	G	B	K	H	D	M	T	G	B	K	H	D	M	T	Votes
1990	Hawthorn	33	7	1	6	51	33	84	24	3	0.1	0.9	7.3	4.7	12.0	3.4	0.4	2
1991^{#}	Hawthorn	33	25	62	49	343	184	527	137	34	2.5	2.0	13.7	7.4	21.1	5.5	1.4	17
1992	Hawthorn	17	20	39	39	194	92	286	86	24	2.0	2.0	9.7	4.6	14.3	4.3	1.2	2
1993	Hawthorn	17	21	51	39	240	79	319	110	22	2.4	1.9	11.4	3.8	15.2	5.2	1.0	3
1994	Hawthorn	17	23	47	36	213	86	299	101	30	2.0	1.6	9.3	3.7	13.0	4.4	1.3	1
1995	Hawthorn	17	21	42	34	185	69	254	79	14	2.0	1.6	8.8	3.3	12.1	3.8	0.7	0
1996	Hawthorn	17	17	22	26	113	47	160	52	15	1.3	1.5	6.6	2.8	9.4	3.1	0.9	0
1997	Western Bulldogs	9	20	27	25	154	78	232	75	15	1.4	1.3	7.7	3.9	11.6	3.8	0.8	0
1998	Western Bulldogs	9	23	61	27	226	105	331	101	32	2.7	1.2	9.8	4.6	14.4	4.4	1.4	0
1999	Western Bulldogs	9	22	51	26	169	72	241	90	23	2.3	1.2	7.7	3.3	11.0	4.1	1.0	1
2000	Western Bulldogs	9	21	37	26	160	71	231	91	20	1.8	1.2	7.6	3.4	11.0	4.3	1.0	0
2001	Western Bulldogs	9	22	38	29	128	65	193	80	15	1.7	1.3	5.8	3.0	8.8	3.6	0.7	3
2002	Richmond	17	3	1	2	12	6	18	8	3	0.3	0.7	4.0	2.0	6.0	2.7	1.0	0
Career			245	479	364	2188	987	3175	1034	250	2.0	1.5	8.9	4.0	13.0	4.2	1.0	29

== Honours and achievements ==
Team

- AFL Premiership player: 1991

Individual

- All-Australian team: 1998
- Western Bulldogs leading Goalkicker: 1998, 1999

== Coaching career ==
Hudson worked as an assistant coach with both the Brisbane Lions and Collingwood. He was later a development manager for the St Kilda Football Club through the Saints' association with Sandringham as its VFL senior coach. His father was football manager at St Kilda under the Ken Sheldon coaching reign from 1990 until 1993.
