= Steven Kolyniuk =

Australian rules footballer

Personal information
- Born: 5 July 1970 (age 56)
- Original team: St Albans (FDFL)
- Height: 174 cm (5 ft 9 in)
- Weight: 84 kg (185 lb)

Playing career^{1}
| Years | Club | Games (Goals) |
| 1987–2000 | Western Bulldogs | 177 (198) |
- ^{1} Playing statistics correct to the end of 2000.

Steven Kolyniuk (born 5 July 1970) is a former Australian rules footballer who played with Footscray in the AFL.

Kolyniuk made his debut for Footscray in 1987 and played with the club for 14 seasons. He managed 177 games before announcing his retirement in 2000. Kolyniuk kicked 198 goals for Footscray with his best season tally coming in 1998 when he kicked 39 goals. His best tally in a game was six goals which he kicked against Carlton at the MCG in Round 7 of 1992. Kolyniuk also represented Victoria in a state of origin match in 1992.

Kolyniuk won the Larke Medal in 1987, as the best Division 1 player in the Teal Cup. He represented Victoria in the competition.

Kolyniuk has coached EDFL side East Keilor Football Club since 2010. This is the third club Kolyniuk has coached after previously coaching Doutta Stars and St Albans Football Clubs.

He is from a Ukrainian family background.
