= Adam Pattison =

Australian rules footballer

Personal information
- Full name: Adam Pattison
- Born: 5 March 1986 (age 40)
- Original team: Old Paradians/Northern Knights
- Draft: 16th overall, 2004 AFL draft 64th overall, 2009 AFL draft 69th overall, 2011 Rookie Draft; Hawthorn
- Height: 198 cm (6 ft 6 in)
- Weight: 97 kg (214 lb)
- Position: Ruckman

Playing career^{1}
Years	Club	Games (Goals)
2005–2009	Richmond	61 (15)
2010	St Kilda	5 (1)
2012	Hawthorn	0 (0)
Total		66 (16)
- ^{1} Playing statistics correct to the end of 2010.

Adam Pattison (born 5 March 1986) is a professional Australian rules footballer and Ruckman for Hawthorn Football Club in the Australian Football League (AFL).

He began his career with Richmond, before moving to St Kilda for the 2010 season.

== AFL career ==
Pattison played for Richmond from 2005 to 2009. He was delisted by the Tigers on 30 October 2009 and was then selected by the St Kilda Football Club in the national draft, with pick number 64, on 26 November 2009. He was delisted after spending one season and five games with St Kilda.

Pattison spent 2011 playing with the Box Hill Hawks. He showed enough for Hawthorn to pick him in the 2011 Rookie Draft.
