= 2000 AFL season =

104th season of the Australian Football League (AFL)

2000 AFL premiership season

Overview
- Date: 8 March – 2 September 2000
- Teams: 16
- Premiers: Essendon; 16th premiership
- Runners-up: Melbourne; 5th runners-up result
- Minor premiers: Essendon; 16th minor premiership
- Ansett Australia Cup: Essendon; 4th pre-season cup win
- Brownlow Medallist: Shane Woewodin (Melbourne); 24 votes
- Coleman Medallist: Matthew Lloyd (Essendon); 94 goals

Attendance
- Matches played: 185
- Total attendance: 6,307,373 (34,094 per match)
- Highest (H&A): 91,571 (round 20, Carlton v Essendon)
- Highest (finals): 96,249 (grand final, Essendon v Melbourne)

The 2000 AFL season was the 104th season of the Australian Football League (AFL), the highest-level senior Australian rules football competition in Australia. The season featured 16 clubs and ran from 8 March until 2 September, comprising a 22-match home-and-away season followed by a finals series featuring the top eight clubs. The season was scheduled earlier than usual to avoid a clash with the 2000 Summer Olympics in Sydney.

Essendon won the premiership, defeating Melbourne by 60 points in the 2000 AFL Grand Final; it was Essendon's 16th VFL/AFL premiership. Essendon also won the minor premiership by finishing atop the home-and-away ladder with a 21–1 win–loss record, with its home-and-away and overall (24–1) win–loss records standing as the best in the league's history. Melbourne's Shane Woewodin won the Brownlow Medal as the league's best and fairest player, and Essendon's Matthew Lloyd won the Coleman Medal as the league's leading goalkicker.

== Ansett Australia Cup ==
The 2000 pre-season began with the 2000 Ansett Australia Cup. Unlike most pre-season competitions which start in February, the 2000 series started on 31 December 1999 with a one-off "Match of the Millennium" between Carlton and Collingwood, which was notable for Brendan Fevola kicking twelve goals, a pre-season record. Essendon defeated the Kangaroos by 41 points in the grand final.

| | 2000 Ansett Australia Cup Grand Final |
| Saturday, 26 February (7:10 pm) | Kangaroos 11.10 (76) | def. by | Essendon 16.21 (117) | Melbourne Cricket Ground (crowd: 56,720) |

== Home-and-away season ==
All starting times are local time. Source: AFL Tables

=== Round 1 ===
| | Round 1 |
| Wednesday, 8 March (7:40 pm) | Richmond 14.10 (94) | def. | Melbourne 13.14 (92) | Melbourne Cricket Ground (crowd: 41,648) | Statistics |
| Thursday, 9 March (8:15 pm) | Essendon 24.12 (156) | def. | Port Adelaide 8.14 (62) | Colonial Stadium (crowd: 43,012) | Statistics |
| Friday, 10 March (7:40 pm) | Kangaroos 16.15 (111) | def. by | West Coast 24.10 (154) | Melbourne Cricket Ground (crowd: 20,580) | Statistics |
| Saturday, 11 March (2:50 pm) | Adelaide 15.18 (108) | def. by | Western Bulldogs 19.17 (131) | Football Park (crowd: 37,222) | Statistics |
| Saturday, 11 March (5:40 pm) | Fremantle 16.11 (107) | def. by | Geelong 19.15 (129) | Subiaco Oval (crowd: 19,777) | Statistics |
| Sunday, 12 March (7:40 pm) | St Kilda 15.10 (100) | def. by | Sydney 21.8 (134) | Colonial Stadium (crowd: 31,440) | Statistics |
| Monday, 13 March (2:10 pm) | Carlton 22.20 (152) | def. | Brisbane Lions 16.16 (112) | Optus Oval (crowd: 22,374) | Statistics |
| Monday, 13 March (2:10 pm) | Hawthorn 13.8 (86) | def. by | Collingwood 20.20 (140) | Melbourne Cricket Ground (crowd: 53,776) | Statistics |
The Essendon v Port Adelaide match was the first match played for premiership points at Colonial Stadium. Essendon recorded its biggest win over Port Adelaide, winning by 94 points.

=== Round 2 ===
| | Round 2 |
| Thursday, 16 March (7:40 pm) | Essendon 20.10 (130) | def. | Richmond 12.15 (87) | Melbourne Cricket Ground (crowd: 49,521) | Statistics |
| Friday, 17 March (7:40 pm) | Melbourne 23.7 (145) | def. | Kangaroos 17.18 (120) | Melbourne Cricket Ground (crowd: 23,348) | Statistics |
| Saturday, 18 March (2:10 pm) | Geelong 21.13 (139) | def. | St Kilda 15.9 (99) | Shell Stadium (crowd: 20,476) | Statistics |
| Saturday, 18 March (7:10 pm) | Port Adelaide 12.15 (87) | def. by | Fremantle 19.11 (125) | Football Park (crowd: 24,695) | Statistics |
| Sunday, 19 March (2:10 pm) | Collingwood 14.19 (103) | def. | Adelaide 13.14 (92) | Melbourne Cricket Ground (crowd: 33,076) | Statistics |
| Sunday, 19 March (2:10 pm) | Carlton 22.22 (154) | def. | Hawthorn 18.4 (112) | Optus Oval (crowd: 21,161) | Statistics |
| Sunday, 19 March (7:40 pm) | Western Bulldogs 17.8 (110) | def. by | Brisbane Lions 21.13 (139) | Colonial Stadium (crowd: 24,460) | Statistics |
| Sunday, 19 March (5:40 pm) | West Coast 10.10 (70) | def. by | Sydney 12.10 (82) | Subiaco Oval (crowd: 38,127) | Statistics |

=== Round 3 ===
| | Round 3 |
| Friday, 24 March (7:40 pm) | Richmond 20.14 (134) | def. by | Kangaroos 27.8 (170) | Melbourne Cricket Ground (crowd: 37,543) | Statistics |
| Saturday, 25 March (2:10 pm) | Hawthorn 16.14 (110) | def. | Brisbane Lions 15.13 (103) | Melbourne Cricket Ground (crowd: 20,374) | Statistics |
| Saturday, 25 March (7:10 pm) | Adelaide 14.16 (100) | def. by | Geelong 17.9 (111) | Football Park (crowd: 39,179) | Statistics |
| Saturday, 25 March (7:40 pm) | St Kilda 18.8 (116) | drew with | West Coast 17.14 (116) | Colonial Stadium (crowd: 21,215) | Statistics |
| Sunday, 26 March (2:10 pm) | Collingwood 24.16 (160) | def. | Carlton 11.21 (87) | Melbourne Cricket Ground (crowd: 82,669) | Statistics |
| Sunday, 26 March (2:10 pm) | Western Bulldogs 22.9 (141) | def. | Port Adelaide 14.10 (94) | Colonial Stadium (crowd: 18,134) | Statistics |
| Sunday, 26 March (2:10 pm) | Sydney 19.12 (126) | def. | Melbourne 17.12 (114) | Sydney Cricket Ground (crowd: 26,920) | Statistics |
| Sunday, 26 March (6:40 pm) | Fremantle 12.16 (88) | def. by | Essendon 19.10 (124) | Subiaco Oval (crowd: 27,230) | Statistics |

=== Round 4 ===
| | Round 4 |
| Friday, 31 March (7:40 pm) | Kangaroos 15.14 (104) | def. | Geelong 15.9 (99) | Colonial Stadium (crowd: 34,623) | Statistics |
| Saturday, 1 April (2:10 pm) | Western Bulldogs 14.14 (98) | def. | Carlton 8.11 (59) | Colonial Stadium (crowd: 30,576) | Statistics |
| Saturday, 1 April (2:10 pm) | Hawthorn 14.6 (90) | def. by | Essendon 20.17 (137) | Melbourne Cricket Ground (crowd: 46,889) | Statistics |
| Saturday, 1 April (7:40 pm) | Sydney 15.11 (101) | def. by | Collingwood 15.16 (106) | Sydney Cricket Ground (crowd: 34,687) | Statistics |
| Saturday, 1 April (8:10 pm) | West Coast 29.13 (187) | def. | Adelaide 10.13 (73) | WACA Ground (crowd: 26,008) | Statistics |
| Sunday, 2 April (1:40 pm) | Port Adelaide 23.11 (149) | def. | Brisbane Lions 15.16 (106) | Football Park (crowd: 24,458) | Statistics |
| Sunday, 2 April (2:10 pm) | Richmond 13.9 (87) | def. by | Fremantle 12.16 (88) | Colonial Stadium (crowd: 23,578) | Statistics |
| Sunday, 2 April (2:10 pm) | Melbourne 25.15 (165) | def. | St Kilda 11.9 (75) | Melbourne Cricket Ground (crowd: 31,642) | Statistics |

=== Round 5 ===
| | Round 5 |
| Friday, 7 April (7:40 pm) | Western Bulldogs 16.14 (110) | def. by | Collingwood 17.16 (118) | Colonial Stadium (crowd: 45,141) | Statistics |
| Saturday, 8 April (2:10 pm) | Essendon 18.15 (123) | def. | Carlton 15.9 (99) | Melbourne Cricket Ground (crowd: 64,658) | Statistics |
| Saturday, 8 April (7:40 pm) | Brisbane Lions 17.20 (122) | def. | Adelaide 13.14 (92) | The Gabba (crowd: 26,395) | Statistics |
| Saturday, 8 April (8:10 pm) | Fremantle 10.15 (75) | def. by | Melbourne 14.22 (106) | WACA Ground (crowd: 20,484) | Statistics |
| Sunday, 9 April (2:10 pm) | Geelong 24.18 (162) | def. | West Coast 11.15 (81) | Shell Stadium (crowd: 22,623) | Statistics |
| Sunday, 9 April (2:10 pm) | Kangaroos 19.14 (128) | def. | Sydney 18.12 (120) | Sydney Cricket Ground (crowd: 19,306) | Statistics |
| Sunday, 9 April (2:10 pm) | St Kilda 11.18 (84) | def. by | Richmond 17.8 (110) | Colonial Stadium (crowd: 26,374) | Statistics |
| Sunday, 9 April (8:10 pm) | Port Adelaide 10.14 (74) | def. by | Hawthorn 16.17 (113) | Football Park (crowd: 22,086) | Statistics |

=== Round 6 ===
| | Round 6 |
| Friday, 14 April (7:40 pm) | Western Bulldogs 12.9 (81) | def. by | Essendon 22.12 (144) | Colonial Stadium (crowd: 42,029) | Statistics |
| Saturday, 15 April (2:10 pm) | Carlton 26.13 (169) | def. | Port Adelaide 12.6 (78) | Optus Oval (crowd: 16,415) | Statistics |
| Saturday, 15 April (2:10 pm) | Collingwood 11.16 (82) | def. by | Kangaroos 17.12 (114) | Melbourne Cricket Ground (crowd: 55,802) | Statistics |
| Saturday, 15 April (7:40 pm) | St Kilda 9.12 (66) | def. by | Brisbane Lions 15.15 (105) | Colonial Stadium (crowd: 18,194) | Statistics |
| Saturday, 15 April (6:40 pm) | West Coast 28.10 (178) | def. | Fremantle 9.7 (61) | Subiaco Oval (crowd: 40,519) | Statistics |
| Sunday, 16 April (2:10 pm) | Geelong 15.19 (109) | def. | Melbourne 12.12 (84) | Shell Stadium (crowd: 26,761) | Statistics |
| Sunday, 16 April (2:40 pm) | Sydney 16.10 (106) | def. by | Richmond 17.10 (112) | Sydney Cricket Ground (crowd: 25,049) | Statistics |
| Sunday, 16 April (2:50 pm) | Adelaide 22.11 (143) | def. | Hawthorn 8.9 (57) | Football Park (crowd: 38,158) | Statistics |
West Coast's 117-point win over Fremantle is the biggest win by either team in a Western Derby. West Coast forward Scott Cummings kicked ten goals in the win.

=== Round 7 ===
| | Round 7 |
| Saturday, 22 April (2:10 pm) | Hawthorn 19.9 (123) | def. | Western Bulldogs 14.8 (92) | Melbourne Cricket Ground (crowd: 29,405) | Statistics |
| Saturday, 22 April (7:40 pm) | Sydney 15.9 (99) | def. by | Geelong 17.6 (108) | Sydney Cricket Ground (crowd: 27,040) | Statistics |
| Saturday, 22 April (7:40 pm) | St Kilda 18.9 (117) | def. by | Kangaroos 19.15 (129) | Colonial Stadium (crowd: 25,977) | Statistics |
| Sunday, 23 April (1:40 pm) | Port Adelaide 13.13 (91) | def. by | Adelaide 14.14 (98) | Football Park (crowd: 41,101) | Statistics |
| Sunday, 23 April (2:10 pm) | Melbourne 20.18 (138) | def. | West Coast 12.5 (77) | Colonial Stadium (crowd: 20,774) | Statistics |
| Monday, 24 April (2:10 pm) | Richmond 10.9 (69) | def. by | Carlton 18.12 (120) | Melbourne Cricket Ground (crowd: 63,149) | Statistics |
| Tuesday, 25 April (2:15 pm) | Collingwood 15.10 (100) | def. by | Essendon 21.14 (140) | Melbourne Cricket Ground (crowd: 88,390) | Statistics |
| Tuesday, 25 April (2:10 pm) | Fremantle 17.9 (111) | def. | Brisbane Lions 15.10 (100) | Subiaco Oval (crowd: 19,800) | Statistics |

=== Round 8 ===
| | Round 8 |
| Friday, 28 April (7:40 pm) | Kangaroos 9.13 (67) | def. by | Hawthorn 18.20 (128) | Melbourne Cricket Ground (crowd: 36,514) | Statistics |
| Saturday, 29 April (2:10 pm) | St Kilda 10.8 (68) | def. by | Adelaide 14.24 (108) | Colonial Stadium (crowd: 20,125) | Statistics |
| Saturday, 29 April (6:40 pm) | West Coast 15.18 (108) | def. | Western Bulldogs 15.12 (102) | WACA Ground (crowd: 26,554) | Statistics |
| Sunday, 30 April (1:40 pm) | Port Adelaide 12.14 (86) | def. by | Melbourne 17.9 (111) | Football Park (crowd: 22,490) | Statistics |
| Sunday, 30 April (2:10 pm) | Carlton 16.13 (109) | def. | Sydney 9.10 (64) | Optus Oval (crowd: 19,964) | Statistics |
| Sunday, 30 April (2:10 pm) | Geelong 11.11 (77) | def. by | Richmond 23.9 (147) | Colonial Stadium (crowd: 35,171) | Statistics |
| Monday, 1 May (7:00 pm) | Collingwood 12.13 (85) | def. by | Fremantle 15.17 (107) | Colonial Stadium (crowd: 33,947) | Statistics |
| Monday, 1 May (7:40 pm) | Brisbane Lions 9.9 (63) | def. by | Essendon 19.13 (127) | The Gabba (crowd: 31,887) | Statistics |

=== Round 9 ===
| | Round 9 |
| Friday, 5 May (7:40 pm) | Western Bulldogs 16.9 (105) | def. | St Kilda 16.8 (104) | Colonial Stadium (crowd: 35,505) | Statistics |
| Saturday, 6 May (2:10 pm) | Hawthorn 14.14 (98) | def. | Geelong 10.13 (73) | Melbourne Cricket Ground (crowd: 39,116) | Statistics |
| Saturday, 6 May (7:10 pm) | Adelaide 19.11 (125) | def. by | Kangaroos 19.14 (128) | Football Park (crowd: 40,402) | Statistics |
| Saturday, 6 May (7:40 pm) | Richmond 11.13 (79) | def. | West Coast 9.16 (70) | Colonial Stadium (crowd: 26,304) | Statistics |
| Sunday, 7 May (2:10 pm) | Melbourne 13.15 (93) | def. by | Essendon 15.16 (106) | Melbourne Cricket Ground (crowd: 62,606) | Statistics |
| Sunday, 7 May (2:10 pm) | Sydney 16.15 (111) | def. | Port Adelaide 11.19 (85) | Sydney Cricket Ground (crowd: 22,446) | Statistics |
| Sunday, 7 May (2:40 pm) | Brisbane Lions 22.14 (146) | def. | Collingwood 18.9 (117) | The Gabba (crowd: 29,046) | Statistics |
| Sunday, 7 May (1:20 pm) | Fremantle 13.4 (82) | def. by | Carlton 21.21 (147) | Subiaco Oval (crowd: 28,421) | Statistics |

=== Round 10 ===
| | Round 10 |
| Friday, 12 May (6:40 pm) | West Coast 17.16 (118) | def. | Hawthorn 13.10 (88) | Subiaco Oval (crowd: 37,549) | Statistics |
| Saturday, 13 May (2:10 pm) | Richmond 15.12 (102) | def. | Collingwood 7.12 (54) | Melbourne Cricket Ground (crowd: 64,769) | Statistics |
| Saturday, 13 May (7:10 pm) | Port Adelaide 10.18 (78) | drew with | Geelong 12.6 (78) | Football Park (crowd: 19,511) | Statistics |
| Saturday, 13 May (7:40 pm) | St Kilda 11.16 (82) | def. by | Carlton 15.19 (109) | Colonial Stadium (crowd: 38,151) | Statistics |
| Sunday, 14 May (2:10 pm) | Essendon 20.12 (132) | def. | Adelaide 12.12 (84) | Colonial Stadium (crowd: 34,626) | Statistics |
| Sunday, 14 May (2:10 pm) | Western Bulldogs 21.11 (137) | def. | Sydney 12.7 (79) | Sydney Cricket Ground (crowd: 18,817) | Statistics |
| Sunday, 14 May (2:10 pm) | Kangaroos 22.16 (148) | def. | Fremantle 8.12 (60) | Melbourne Cricket Ground (crowd: 12,400) | Statistics |
| Monday, 15 May (7:00 pm) | Melbourne 15.12 (102) | def. | Brisbane Lions 11.18 (84) | Colonial Stadium (crowd: 24,908) | Statistics |

=== Round 11 ===
| | Round 11 |
| Friday, 19 May (7:40 pm) | St Kilda 17.15 (117) | def. | Port Adelaide 8.7 (55) | Colonial Stadium (crowd: 17,509) | Statistics |
| Saturday, 20 May (2:10 pm) | Carlton 20.9 (129) | def. | Kangaroos 15.9 (99) | Optus Oval (crowd: 28,944) | Statistics |
| Saturday, 20 May (2:10 pm) | Hawthorn 11.11 (77) | def. by | Richmond 11.14 (80) | Melbourne Cricket Ground (crowd: 41,057) | Statistics |
| Saturday, 20 May (7:40 pm) | Geelong 13.9 (87) | def. by | Essendon 22.13 (145) | Colonial Stadium (crowd: 47,071) | Statistics |
| Saturday, 20 May (6:40 pm) | Fremantle 12.9 (81) | def. by | Western Bulldogs 27.12 (174) | Subiaco Oval (crowd: 20,821) | Statistics |
| Sunday, 21 May (2:10 pm) | Collingwood 13.14 (92) | def. by | West Coast 18.20 (128) | Colonial Stadium (crowd: 29,072) | Statistics |
| Sunday, 21 May (2:10 pm) | Adelaide 15.15 (105) | def. | Melbourne 8.22 (70) | Football Park (crowd: 37,871) | Statistics |
| Sunday, 21 May (3:20 pm) | Sydney 15.17 (107) | def. by | Brisbane Lions 16.14 (110) | Sydney Cricket Ground (crowd: 19,789) | Statistics |

=== Round 12 ===
| | Round 12 |
| Friday, 26 May (7:40 pm) | Essendon 25.19 (169) | def. | St Kilda 13.5 (83) | Colonial Stadium (crowd: 39,836) | Statistics |
| Saturday, 27 May (2:10 pm) | Collingwood 9.13 (67) | def. by | Geelong 10.11 (71) | Melbourne Cricket Ground (crowd: 34,367) | Statistics |
| Saturday, 27 May (7:10 pm) | Adelaide 14.14 (98) | def. | Sydney 7.6 (48) | Football Park (crowd: 30,350) | Statistics |
| Saturday, 27 May (7:40 pm) | Hawthorn 19.7 (121) | def. | Fremantle 8.14 (62) | Colonial Stadium (crowd: 16,004) | Statistics |
| Saturday, 27 May (7:40 pm) | Brisbane Lions 14.15 (99) | def. by | Richmond 17.9 (111) | The Gabba (crowd: 29,967) | Statistics |
| Sunday, 28 May (2:10 pm) | Western Bulldogs 16.12 (108) | def. | Melbourne 13.5 (83) | Colonial Stadium (crowd: 26,180) | Statistics |
| Sunday, 28 May (2:40 pm) | Kangaroos 10.16 (76) | def. | Port Adelaide 8.11 (59) | Sydney Cricket Ground (crowd: 7,334) | Statistics |
| Sunday, 28 May (1:20 pm) | West Coast 11.12 (78) | def. by | Carlton 20.8 (128) | Subiaco Oval (crowd: 39,968) | Statistics |

=== Round 13 ===
| | Round 13 |
| Friday, 2 June (7:40 pm) | Richmond 17.10 (112) | def. by | Adelaide 17.19 (121) | Colonial Stadium (crowd: 32,959) | Statistics |
| Saturday, 3 June (2:10 pm) | Melbourne 9.7 (61) | def. by | Carlton 25.9 (159) | Melbourne Cricket Ground (crowd: 41,889) | Statistics |
| Saturday, 3 June (7:10 pm) | Port Adelaide 12.17 (89) | def. | Collingwood 11.9 (75) | Football Park (crowd: 22,691) | Statistics |
| Saturday, 3 June (7:40 pm) | Brisbane Lions 27.11 (173) | def. | West Coast 13.11 (89) | The Gabba (crowd: 25,359) | Statistics |
| Sunday, 4 June (2:10 pm) | Essendon 17.17 (119) | def. | Kangaroos 11.4 (70) | Melbourne Cricket Ground (crowd: 67,172) | Statistics |
| Sunday, 4 June (2:10 pm) | Geelong 19.12 (126) | def. | Western Bulldogs 18.11 (119) | Colonial Stadium (crowd: 30,573) | Statistics |
| Sunday, 4 June (2:40 pm) | Sydney 16.13 (109) | def. | Hawthorn 11.12 (78) | Sydney Cricket Ground (crowd: 21,353) | Statistics |
| Sunday, 4 June (1:20 pm) | Fremantle 14.16 (100) | def. | St Kilda 8.8 (56) | Subiaco Oval (crowd: 21,278) | Statistics |

=== Round 14 ===
| | Round 14 |
| Friday, 9 June (7:40 pm) | Kangaroos 17.14 (116) | def. | Brisbane Lions 17.10 (112) | Colonial Stadium (crowd: 26,326) | Statistics |
| Saturday, 10 June (2:10 pm) | Melbourne 22.11 (143) | def. | Collingwood 12.6 (78) | Melbourne Cricket Ground (crowd: 39,710) | Statistics |
| Saturday, 10 June (6:40 pm) | West Coast 10.11 (71) | def. by | Port Adelaide 16.11 (107) | Subiaco Oval (crowd: 31,996) | Statistics |
| Sunday, 11 June (2:10 pm) | Carlton 15.17 (107) | def. | Geelong 15.7 (97) | Optus Oval (crowd: 31,988) | Statistics |
| Sunday, 11 June (2:10 pm) | Sydney 11.10 (76) | def. by | Essendon 12.17 (89) | Sydney Cricket Ground (crowd: 29,199) | Statistics |
| Sunday, 11 June (2:10 pm) | St Kilda 13.8 (86) | def. by | Hawthorn 27.9 (171) | Melbourne Cricket Ground (crowd: 21,744) | Statistics |
| Sunday, 11 June (8:10 pm) | Adelaide 22.13 (145) | def. | Fremantle 11.6 (72) | Football Park (crowd: 40,917) | Statistics |
| Monday, 12 June (2:10 pm) | Richmond 12.15 (87) | def. | Western Bulldogs 7.10 (52) | Melbourne Cricket Ground (crowd: 49,557) | Statistics |
The St Kilda v Hawthorn match was moved from Colonial Stadium to the Melbourne Cricket Ground after the former's playing surface was so poor it was deemed an unsafe workplace.

=== Round 15 ===
| | Round 15 |
| Friday, 16 June (7:40 pm) | Collingwood 17.13 (115) | def. | St Kilda 13.4 (82) | Melbourne Cricket Ground (crowd: 35,542) | Statistics |
| Saturday, 17 June (2:10 pm) | Carlton 19.6 (120) | def. | Adelaide 14.12 (96) | Optus Oval (crowd: 25,563) | Statistics |
| Saturday, 17 June (2:10 pm) | Geelong 7.17 (59) | def. by | Brisbane Lions 20.8 (128) | Shell Stadium (crowd: 21,003) | Statistics |
| Saturday, 17 June (2:10 pm) | Hawthorn 10.12 (72) | def. by | Melbourne 22.9 (141) | Melbourne Cricket Ground (crowd: 39,215) | Statistics |
| Saturday, 17 June (7:40 pm) | Essendon 15.18 (108) | def. | West Coast 11.10 (76) | Colonial Stadium (crowd: 39,694) | Statistics |
| Sunday, 18 June (2:10 pm) | Western Bulldogs 16.10 (106) | def. | Kangaroos 15.12 (102) | Colonial Stadium (crowd: 27,695) | Statistics |
| Sunday, 18 June (2:10 pm) | Port Adelaide 15.13 (103) | def. | Richmond 11.9 (75) | Football Park (crowd: 26,053) | Statistics |
| Sunday, 18 June (1:20 pm) | Fremantle 20.3 (123) | def. | Sydney 14.12 (96) | Subiaco Oval (crowd: 20,465) | Statistics |

=== Round 16 ===
| | Round 16 |
| Friday, 23 June (7:40 pm) | Collingwood 10.8 (68) | def. by | Hawthorn 19.11 (125) | Colonial Stadium (crowd: 38,745) | Statistics |
| Saturday, 24 June (2:10 pm) | Geelong 12.18 (90) | def. | Fremantle 12.12 (84) | Shell Stadium (crowd: 17,399) | Statistics |
| Saturday, 24 June (2:10 pm) | Melbourne 16.14 (110) | def. | Richmond 14.16 (100) | Melbourne Cricket Ground (crowd: 43,200) | Statistics |
| Saturday, 24 June (7:40 pm) | Sydney 14.9 (93) | def. | St Kilda 10.5 (65) | Sydney Cricket Ground (crowd: 22,154) | Statistics |
| Saturday, 24 June (8:10 pm) | Port Adelaide 7.16 (58) | def. by | Essendon 12.17 (89) | Football Park (crowd: 35,129) | Statistics |
| Sunday, 25 June (2:10 pm) | Western Bulldogs 21.9 (135) | def. | Adelaide 10.14 (74) | Colonial Stadium (crowd: 22,229) | Statistics |
| Sunday, 25 June (2:40 pm) | Brisbane Lions 17.10 (112) | def. by | Carlton 23.18 (156) | The Gabba (crowd: 34,743) | Statistics |
| Sunday, 25 June (1:20 pm) | West Coast 7.10 (52) | def. by | Kangaroos 16.17 (113) | Subiaco Oval (crowd: 36,461) | Statistics |

=== Round 17 ===
| | Round 17 |
| Friday, 30 June (7:40 pm) | St Kilda 16.13 (109) | def. | Geelong 13.7 (85) | Colonial Stadium (crowd: 23,870) | Statistics |
| Saturday, 1 July (2:10 pm) | Richmond 10.6 (66) | def. by | Essendon 24.23 (167) | Melbourne Cricket Ground (crowd: 73,465) | Statistics |
| Saturday, 1 July (7:40 pm) | Kangaroos 14.19 (103) | def. | Melbourne 14.18 (102) | Colonial Stadium (crowd: 30,423) | Statistics |
| Saturday, 1 July (6:40 pm) | Fremantle 12.10 (82) | def. | Port Adelaide 8.16 (64) | WACA Ground (crowd: 10,826) | Statistics |
| Sunday, 2 July (2:10 pm) | Hawthorn 9.9 (63) | def. by | Carlton 18.12 (120) | Melbourne Cricket Ground (crowd: 48,268) | Statistics |
| Sunday, 2 July (2:10 pm) | Sydney 22.19 (151) | def. | West Coast 12.8 (80) | Sydney Cricket Ground (crowd: 22,002) | Statistics |
| Sunday, 2 July (2:40 pm) | Brisbane Lions 20.18 (138) | def. | Western Bulldogs 11.15 (81) | The Gabba (crowd: 24,662) | Statistics |
| Sunday, 2 July (2:50 pm) | Adelaide 22.15 (147) | def. | Collingwood 16.13 (109) | Football Park (crowd: 40,171) | Statistics |
Essendon broke the record for its longest winning streak by winning its first 17 matches of the season. Essendon would win a further three consecutive matches to set the record at 20.; Essendon's 101-point win over Richmond was its biggest since 1960 and second-biggest of all time over Richmond.

=== Round 18 ===
| | Round 18 |
| Friday, 7 July (7:40 pm) | Essendon 24.15 (159) | def. | Fremantle 11.6 (72) | Colonial Stadium (crowd: 34,567) | Statistics |
| Saturday, 8 July (2:10 pm) | Geelong 17.7 (109) | def. | Adelaide 14.18 (102) | Shell Stadium (crowd: 20,480) | Statistics |
| Saturday, 8 July (2:10 pm) | Melbourne 19.11 (125) | def. | Sydney 15.9 (99) | Melbourne Cricket Ground (crowd: 33,923) | Statistics |
| Saturday, 8 July (7:40 pm) | Kangaroos 20.14 (134) | def. | Richmond 7.14 (56) | Sydney Cricket Ground (crowd: 9,198) | Statistics |
| Saturday, 8 July (7:10 pm) | West Coast 17.13 (115) | def. | St Kilda 4.5 (29) | WACA Ground (crowd: 22,232) | Statistics |
| Sunday, 9 July (2:10 pm) | Carlton 28.12 (180) | def. | Collingwood 10.9 (69) | Optus Oval (crowd: 30,096) | Statistics |
| Sunday, 9 July (2:10 pm) | Port Adelaide 23.11 (149) | def. | Western Bulldogs 16.10 (106) | Football Park (crowd: 21,783) | Statistics |
| Sunday, 9 July (3:20 pm) | Brisbane Lions 16.10 (106) | def. by | Hawthorn 18.16 (124) | The Gabba (crowd: 26,782) | Statistics |
Carlton played against Collingwood at Optus Oval for the first time since 1982 (and the last time to date). Carlton recorded its highest score (180) and biggest win (111 points) against Collingwood.

=== Round 19 ===
| | Round 19 |
| Friday, 14 July (7:40 pm) | Geelong 13.7 (85) | def. by | Kangaroos 18.16 (124) | Colonial Stadium (crowd: 37,446) | Statistics |
| Friday, 14 July (8:10 pm) | Adelaide 15.17 (107) | def. | West Coast 13.12 (90) | Football Park (crowd: 35,425) | Statistics |
| Saturday, 15 July (2:10 pm) | Carlton 11.6 (72) | def. by | Western Bulldogs 11.9 (75) | Optus Oval (crowd: 25,397) | Statistics |
| Saturday, 15 July (7:40 pm) | Essendon 25.15 (165) | def. | Hawthorn 13.4 (82) | Colonial Stadium (crowd: 46,946) | Statistics |
| Sunday, 16 July (12:40 pm) | Brisbane Lions 18.12 (120) | def. | Port Adelaide 7.11 (53) | The Gabba (crowd: 21,956) | Statistics |
| Sunday, 16 July (2:10 pm) | Collingwood 12.12 (84) | def. by | Sydney 15.14 (104) | Melbourne Cricket Ground (crowd: 33,182) | Statistics |
| Sunday, 16 July (2:10 pm) | St Kilda 14.14 (98) | def. by | Melbourne 17.14 (116) | Colonial Stadium (crowd: 24,039) | Statistics |
| Sunday, 16 July (1:20 pm) | Fremantle 12.7 (79) | def. by | Richmond 15.16 (106) | WACA Ground (crowd: 19,116) | Statistics |
The match between Fremantle and Richmond was the final VFL/AFL match held at the WACA Ground.

=== Round 20 ===
| | Round 20 |
| Friday, 21 July (7:40 pm) | Carlton 12.11 (83) | def. by | Essendon 16.13 (109) | Melbourne Cricket Ground (crowd: 91,571) | Statistics |
| Saturday, 22 July (2:10 pm) | Hawthorn 15.11 (101) | def. | Port Adelaide 12.8 (80) | Melbourne Cricket Ground (crowd: 18,976) | Statistics |
| Saturday, 22 July (7:40 pm) | Collingwood 13.13 (91) | def. by | Western Bulldogs 15.10 (100) | Colonial Stadium (crowd: 30,342) | Statistics |
| Saturday, 22 July (7:40 pm) | Sydney 21.19 (145) | def. | Kangaroos 14.7 (91) | Sydney Cricket Ground (crowd: 30,551) | Statistics |
| Saturday, 22 July (6:40 pm) | West Coast 12.6 (78) | def. by | Geelong 14.24 (108) | Subiaco Oval (crowd: 30,615) | Statistics |
| Sunday, 23 July (1:40 pm) | Adelaide 11.12 (78) | def. by | Brisbane Lions 17.13 (115) | Football Park (crowd: 40,817) | Statistics |
| Sunday, 23 July (2:10 pm) | Melbourne 25.10 (160) | def. | Fremantle 11.11 (77) | Colonial Stadium (crowd: 16,120) | Statistics |
| Sunday, 23 July (2:10 pm) | Richmond 18.11 (119) | def. | St Kilda 12.7 (79) | Melbourne Cricket Ground (crowd: 35,463) | Statistics |

=== Round 21 ===
| | Round 21 |
| Friday, 28 July (7:40 pm) | Essendon 12.9 (81) | def. by | Western Bulldogs 14.8 (92) | Colonial Stadium (crowd: 45,725) | Statistics |
| Saturday, 29 July (2:10 pm) | Hawthorn 15.8 (98) | def. | Adelaide 9.13 (67) | Melbourne Cricket Ground (crowd: 25,512) | Statistics |
| Saturday, 29 July (2:10 pm) | Richmond 12.11 (83) | def. by | Sydney 12.12 (84) | Colonial Stadium (crowd: 35,697) | Statistics |
| Saturday, 29 July (7:40 pm) | Brisbane Lions 23.15 (153) | def. | St Kilda 8.15 (63) | The Gabba (crowd: 25,603) | Statistics |
| Sunday, 30 July (1:40 pm) | Port Adelaide 12.16 (88) | def. | Carlton 12.11 (83) | Football Park (crowd: 30,152) | Statistics |
| Sunday, 30 July (2:10 pm) | Kangaroos 11.14 (80) | def. by | Collingwood 14.14 (98) | Colonial Stadium (crowd: 30,003) | Statistics |
| Sunday, 30 July (2:10 pm) | Melbourne 18.18 (126) | def. | Geelong 17.6 (108) | Melbourne Cricket Ground (crowd: 75,033) | Statistics |
| Sunday, 30 July (1:20 pm) | Fremantle 15.11 (101) | def. | West Coast 15.10 (100) | Subiaco Oval (crowd: 37,710) | Statistics |
Essendon's loss to the Western Bulldogs was its first for the season, ending a club record 20-match winning streak. The match was later referred to as the Super-Flood, following the extreme flooding tactics implemented by the Bulldogs to win the game.; Fremantle's win over West Coast, just its second in twelve Western Derbies, was later referred to as the Demolition Derby after several fights erupted during the match. Four players were suspended for a total of 15 matches (Fremantle's Dale Kickett received the most weeks with nine) and eleven players were fined.

=== Round 22 ===
| | Round 22 |
| Friday, 4 August (7:40 pm) | Western Bulldogs 9.12 (66) | def. by | Hawthorn 11.15 (81) | Colonial Stadium (crowd: 45,527) | Statistics |
| Saturday, 5 August (2:10 pm) | Essendon 13.19 (97) | def. | Collingwood 11.12 (78) | Melbourne Cricket Ground (crowd: 66,122) | Statistics |
| Saturday, 5 August (2:10 pm) | Geelong 18.16 (124) | def. | Sydney 18.12 (120) | Shell Stadium (crowd: 26,011) | Statistics |
| Saturday, 5 August (7:40 pm) | Brisbane Lions 23.18 (156) | def. | Fremantle 7.7 (49) | The Gabba (crowd: 25,070) | Statistics |
| Saturday, 5 August (7:40 pm) | Kangaroos 18.12 (120) | def. | St Kilda 10.17 (77) | Colonial Stadium (crowd: 16,310) | Statistics |
| Sunday, 6 August (2:10 pm) | Carlton 19.11 (125) | def. | Richmond 7.10 (52) | Melbourne Cricket Ground (crowd: 65,078) | Statistics |
| Sunday, 6 August (2:10 pm) | Adelaide 14.8 (92) | def. by | Port Adelaide 20.19 (139) | Football Park (crowd: 42,659) | Statistics |
| Sunday, 6 August (1:10 pm) | West Coast 15.10 (100) | def. by | Melbourne 26.14 (170) | Subiaco Oval (crowd: 34,471) | Statistics |

== Ladder ==
| (P) | Premiers |
| | Qualified for finals |

| # | Team | P | W | L | D | PF | PA | % | Pts |
|---|---|---|---|---|---|---|---|---|---|
| 1 | Essendon (P) | 22 | 21 | 1 | 0 | 2816 | 1770 | 159.1 | 84 |
| 2 | Carlton | 22 | 16 | 6 | 0 | 2667 | 1979 | 134.8 | 64 |
| 3 | Melbourne | 22 | 14 | 8 | 0 | 2557 | 2159 | 118.4 | 56 |
| 4 | Kangaroos | 22 | 14 | 8 | 0 | 2447 | 2304 | 106.2 | 56 |
| 5 | Geelong | 22 | 12 | 9 | 1 | 2234 | 2306 | 96.9 | 50 |
| 6 | Brisbane Lions | 22 | 12 | 10 | 0 | 2602 | 2222 | 117.1 | 48 |
| 7 | Western Bulldogs | 22 | 12 | 10 | 0 | 2321 | 2241 | 103.6 | 48 |
| 8 | Hawthorn | 22 | 12 | 10 | 0 | 2198 | 2251 | 97.6 | 48 |
| 9 | Richmond | 22 | 11 | 11 | 0 | 2068 | 2221 | 93.1 | 44 |
| 10 | Sydney | 22 | 10 | 12 | 0 | 2254 | 2219 | 101.6 | 40 |
| 11 | Adelaide | 22 | 9 | 13 | 0 | 2255 | 2347 | 96.1 | 36 |
| 12 | Fremantle | 22 | 8 | 14 | 0 | 1886 | 2618 | 72.0 | 32 |
| 13 | West Coast | 22 | 7 | 14 | 1 | 2216 | 2399 | 92.4 | 30 |
| 14 | Port Adelaide | 22 | 7 | 14 | 1 | 1928 | 2295 | 84.0 | 30 |
| 15 | Collingwood | 22 | 7 | 15 | 0 | 2089 | 2431 | 85.9 | 28 |
| 16 | St Kilda | 22 | 2 | 19 | 1 | 1855 | 2631 | 70.5 | 10 |

Rules for classification: 1. premiership points; 2. percentage; 3. points for
Average score: 103.4
Source: AFL Tables

== Progression by round ==
| 4 | Finished the round in first place | 0 | Finished the round in last place |
| 4 | Won the minor premiership | 0 | Finished the season in last place |
| 4 | Finished the round inside the top eight | | |
| 4_{1} | Subscript indicates the ladder position at the end of the round | | |

| Team | 1 | 2 | 3 | 4 | 5 | 6 | 7 | 8 | 9 | 10 | 11 | 12 | 13 | 14 | 15 | 16 | 17 | 18 | 19 | 20 | 21 | 22 |
|---|---|---|---|---|---|---|---|---|---|---|---|---|---|---|---|---|---|---|---|---|---|---|
| Essendon | 4_{1} | 8_{1} | 12_{1} | 16_{1} | 20_{1} | 24_{1} | 28_{1} | 32_{1} | 36_{1} | 40_{1} | 44_{1} | 48_{1} | 52_{1} | 56_{1} | 60_{1} | 64_{1} | 68_{1} | 72_{1} | 76_{1} | 80_{1} | 80_{1} | 84_{1} |
| Carlton | 4_{4} | 8_{2} | 8_{6} | 8_{10} | 8_{10} | 12_{8} | 16_{6} | 20_{4} | 24_{2} | 28_{2} | 32_{2} | 36_{2} | 40_{2} | 44_{2} | 48_{2} | 52_{2} | 56_{2} | 60_{2} | 60_{2} | 60_{2} | 60_{2} | 64_{2} |
| Melbourne | 0_{9} | 4_{7} | 4_{8} | 8_{7} | 12_{4} | 12_{6} | 16_{5} | 20_{3} | 20_{5} | 24_{5} | 24_{7} | 24_{8} | 24_{8} | 28_{6} | 32_{6} | 36_{5} | 36_{5} | 40_{5} | 44_{4} | 48_{4} | 52_{3} | 56_{3} |
| Kangaroos | 0_{14} | 0_{13} | 4_{11} | 8_{9} | 12_{7} | 16_{4} | 20_{4} | 20_{6} | 24_{4} | 28_{3} | 28_{4} | 32_{4} | 32_{5} | 36_{4} | 36_{4} | 40_{3} | 44_{3} | 48_{3} | 52_{3} | 52_{3} | 52_{4} | 56_{4} |
| Geelong | 4_{7} | 8_{4} | 12_{3} | 12_{4} | 16_{3} | 20_{2} | 24_{2} | 24_{2} | 24_{3} | 26_{4} | 26_{6} | 30_{5} | 34_{3} | 34_{5} | 34_{5} | 38_{4} | 38_{4} | 42_{4} | 42_{5} | 46_{5} | 46_{6} | 50_{5} |
| Brisbane Lions | 0_{13} | 4_{10} | 4_{9} | 4_{11} | 8_{9} | 12_{10} | 12_{9} | 12_{14} | 16_{12} | 16_{12} | 20_{9} | 20_{12} | 24_{9} | 24_{11} | 28_{8} | 28_{9} | 32_{8} | 32_{9} | 36_{8} | 40_{8} | 44_{7} | 48_{6} |
| Western Bulldogs | 4_{6} | 4_{9} | 8_{5} | 12_{3} | 12_{5} | 12_{9} | 12_{10} | 12_{12} | 16_{11} | 20_{8} | 24_{8} | 28_{6} | 28_{6} | 28_{7} | 32_{7} | 36_{6} | 36_{6} | 36_{6} | 40_{6} | 44_{6} | 48_{5} | 48_{7} |
| Hawthorn | 0_{15} | 0_{15} | 4_{13} | 4_{13} | 8_{13} | 8_{13} | 12_{12} | 16_{9} | 20_{8} | 20_{10} | 20_{11} | 24_{9} | 24_{11} | 28_{9} | 28_{10} | 32_{8} | 32_{10} | 36_{7} | 36_{10} | 40_{9} | 44_{8} | 48_{8} |
| Richmond | 4_{8} | 4_{11} | 4_{12} | 4_{12} | 8_{11} | 12_{11} | 12_{11} | 16_{8} | 20_{7} | 24_{6} | 28_{3} | 32_{3} | 32_{4} | 36_{3} | 36_{3} | 36_{7} | 36_{7} | 36_{8} | 40_{7} | 44_{7} | 44_{9} | 44_{9} |
| Sydney | 4_{5} | 8_{5} | 12_{4} | 12_{5} | 12_{6} | 12_{7} | 12_{8} | 12_{11} | 16_{10} | 16_{11} | 16_{12} | 16_{13} | 20_{12} | 20_{12} | 20_{14} | 24_{12} | 28_{11} | 28_{12} | 32_{11} | 36_{10} | 40_{10} | 40_{10} |
| Adelaide | 0_{11} | 0_{12} | 0_{15} | 0_{16} | 0_{16} | 4_{14} | 8_{14} | 12_{13} | 12_{14} | 12_{14} | 16_{13} | 20_{10} | 24_{10} | 28_{8} | 28_{9} | 28_{10} | 32_{9} | 32_{10} | 36_{9} | 36_{11} | 36_{11} | 36_{11} |
| Fremantle | 0_{10} | 4_{8} | 4_{10} | 8_{8} | 8_{12} | 8_{12} | 12_{13} | 16_{10} | 16_{13} | 16_{13} | 16_{14} | 16_{14} | 20_{14} | 20_{14} | 24_{13} | 24_{14} | 28_{12} | 28_{13} | 28_{13} | 28_{13} | 32_{12} | 32_{12} |
| West Coast | 4_{3} | 4_{6} | 6_{7} | 10_{6} | 10_{8} | 14_{5} | 14_{7} | 18_{7} | 18_{9} | 22_{7} | 26_{5} | 26_{7} | 26_{7} | 26_{10} | 26_{11} | 26_{11} | 26_{13} | 30_{11} | 30_{12} | 30_{12} | 30_{13} | 30_{13} |
| Port Adelaide | 0_{16} | 0_{16} | 0_{16} | 4_{14} | 4_{14} | 4_{15} | 4_{15} | 4_{15} | 4_{15} | 6_{15} | 6_{16} | 6_{16} | 10_{15} | 14_{15} | 18_{15} | 18_{15} | 18_{15} | 22_{15} | 22_{15} | 22_{15} | 26_{15} | 30_{14} |
| Collingwood | 4_{2} | 8_{3} | 12_{2} | 16_{2} | 20_{2} | 20_{3} | 20_{3} | 20_{5} | 20_{6} | 20_{9} | 20_{10} | 20_{11} | 20_{13} | 20_{13} | 24_{12} | 24_{13} | 24_{14} | 24_{14} | 24_{14} | 24_{14} | 28_{14} | 28_{15} |
| St Kilda | 0_{12} | 0_{14} | 2_{14} | 2_{15} | 2_{15} | 2_{16} | 2_{16} | 2_{16} | 2_{16} | 2_{16} | 6_{15} | 6_{15} | 6_{16} | 6_{16} | 6_{16} | 6_{16} | 10_{16} | 10_{16} | 10_{16} | 10_{16} | 10_{16} | 10_{16} |

Source: AFL Tables

== Home matches and membership ==
| Team | Home match attendance | | | | | | | Membership | | |
| Team | Hosted | Total | Highest | Lowest | Average | | | 1999 | 2000 | Change |
| Team | Hosted | Total | Highest | Lowest | 1999 | 2000 | Change | 1999 | 2000 | Change |
|---|---|---|---|---|---|---|---|---|---|---|
| Adelaide | 11 | 423,171 | 42,659 | 30,350 | 39,393 | 38,470 | ▼923 | 42,120 | 42,896 | ▲776 |
| Brisbane Lions | 11 | 301,470 | 34,743 | 21,956 | 21,890 | 27,406 | ▲5,516 | 16,931 | 20,295 | ▲3,364 |
| Carlton | 11 | 378,551 | 91,571 | 16,415 | 35,037 | 34,414 | ▼623 | 25,719 | 27,571 | ▲1,852 |
| Collingwood | 11 | 495,134 | 88,390 | 29,072 | 39,126 | 45,012 | ▲5,886 | 32,358 | 28,932 | ▼3,426 |
| Essendon | 11 | 531,879 | 67,172 | 34,567 | 57,309 | 48,353 | ▼8,956 | 29,858 | 34,278 | ▲4,420 |
| Fremantle | 11 | 245,928 | 37,710 | 10,826 | 23,972 | 22,357 | ▼1,615 | 24,896 | 24,925 | ▲29 |
| Geelong | 11 | 305,014 | 47,071 | 17,399 | 24,840 | 27,729 | ▲2,889 | 21,032 | 25,595 | ▲4,563 |
| Hawthorn | 11 | 378,592 | 53,776 | 16,004 | 34,864 | 34,417 | ▼447 | 32,120 | 26,879 | ▼5,241 |
| Kangaroos | 11 | 243,017 | 36,514 | 7,334 | 25,890 | 22,092 | ▼3,798 | 22,080 | 22,156 | ▲76 |
| Melbourne | 11 | 413,153 | 75,033 | 16,120 | 31,955 | 37,559 | ▲5,604 | 19,713 | 18,227 | ▼1,486 |
| Port Adelaide | 11 | 290,149 | 41,101 | 19,511 | 31,269 | 26,377 | ▼4,892 | 37,166 | 34,925 | ▼2,241 |
| Richmond | 11 | 484,132 | 73,465 | 23,578 | 40,533 | 44,012 | ▲3,479 | 29,047 | 26,869 | ▼2,178 |
| St Kilda | 11 | 268,638 | 38,151 | 17,509 | 33,182 | 24,422 | ▼8,760 | 20,793 | 17,855 | ▼2,938 |
| Sydney | 11 | 281,190 | 34,687 | 19,789 | 30,539 | 25,563 | ▼4,976 | 31,175 | 30,177 | ▼998 |
| West Coast | 11 | 364,500 | 40,519 | 22,232 | 30,868 | 33,136 | ▲2,268 | 36,212 | 38,868 | ▲2,656 |
| Western Bulldogs | 11 | 336,293 | 45,527 | 18,134 | 24,023 | 30,572 | ▲6,549 | 20,491 | 18,056 | ▼2,435 |
| Total | 176 | 5,740,811 | 91,571 | 7,334 | 32,793 | 32,618 | ▼175 | 441,711 | 438,504 | ▼3,207 |

Source: AFL Tables

== Finals series ==
Qualifying and elimination finals
12 August, Melbourne Cricket Ground
1 | Essendon | 31.12 (198)
4 | Kangaroos | 11.7 (73)
11 August, Colonial Stadium
5 | Geelong | 12.11 (83)
8 | Hawthorn | 14.8 (92)
12 August, The Gabba
6 | Brisbane Lions | 15.20 (110)
7 | Western Bulldogs | 10.16 (76)
13 August, Melbourne Cricket Ground
2 | Carlton | 12.15 (87)
3 | Melbourne | 15.6 (96)

Semi-finals
18 August, Melbourne Cricket Ground
Kangaroos | 16.14 (110)
Hawthorn | 15.10 (100)
19 August, Melbourne Cricket Ground
Carlton | 23.13 (151)
Brisbane Lions | 10.9 (69)

Preliminary finals
26 August, Melbourne Cricket Ground
Essendon | 18.17 (125)
Carlton | 12.8 (80)
25 August, Melbourne Cricket Ground
Melbourne | 23.18 (156)
Kangaroos | 17.4 (106)

Grand final
2 September, Melbourne Cricket Ground
Essendon | 19.21 (135)
Melbourne | 11.9 (75)

All starting times are local time. Source: AFL Tables

=== Finals week 1 ===
| | First elimination final |
| Friday, 11 August (7:45 pm) | Geelong 12.11 (83) | def. by | Hawthorn 14.8 (92) | Colonial Stadium (crowd: 44,709) | Statistics |

| | First qualifying final |
| Saturday, 12 August (2:30 pm) | Essendon 31.12 (198) | def. | Kangaroos 11.7 (73) | Melbourne Cricket Ground (crowd: 68,443) | Statistics |

| | Second elimination final |
| Saturday, 12 August (7:45 pm) | Brisbane Lions 15.20 (110) | def. | Western Bulldogs 10.16 (76) | The Gabba (crowd: 25,925) | Statistics |

| | Second qualifying final |
| Sunday, 13 August (2:30 pm) | Carlton 12.15 (87) | def. by | Melbourne 15.6 (96) | Melbourne Cricket Ground (crowd: 75,570) | Statistics |
Essendon recorded its highest score (198) and biggest win (125 points) against the Kangaroos.

=== Finals week 2 ===
| | First semi-final |
| Friday, 18 August (7:45 pm) | Kangaroos 16.14 (110) | def. | Hawthorn 15.10 (100) | Melbourne Cricket Ground (crowd: 50,027) | Statistics |

| | Second semi-final |
| Saturday, 19 August (2:30 pm) | Carlton 23.13 (151) | def. | Brisbane Lions 10.9 (69) | Melbourne Cricket Ground (crowd: 56,924) | Statistics |
Carlton broke the record set earlier in the season for its biggest win (82 points) against the Brisbane Lions.

=== Finals week 3 ===
| | Second preliminary final |
| Friday, 25 August (7:45 pm) | Melbourne 23.18 (156) | def. | Kangaroos 17.4 (106) | Melbourne Cricket Ground (crowd: 63,937) | Statistics |

| | First preliminary final |
| Saturday, 26 August (2:30 pm) | Essendon 18.17 (125) | def. | Carlton 12.8 (80) | Melbourne Cricket Ground (crowd: 84,778) | Statistics |

=== Grand final ===
| | Grand final |
| Saturday, 2 September (2:45 pm) | Essendon 19.21 (135) | def. | Melbourne 11.9 (75) | Melbourne Cricket Ground (crowd: 96,249) | Statistics |

== Win/loss table ==
The following table can be sorted from biggest winning margin to biggest losing margin for each round. If two or more matches in a round are decided by the same margin, these margins are sorted by percentage (i.e. the lowest-scoring winning team is ranked highest and the lowest-scoring losing team is ranked lowest). Opponents are listed above the margins and home matches are in bold.

| + | Win | Qualified for finals |
| − | Loss | Eliminated |

| Team | Home-and-away season | | | | | | | | | | | | | | | | | | | | | | Ladder | Finals series | | | |
| Team | 1 | 2 | 3 | 4 | 5 | 6 | 7 | 8 | 9 | 10 | 11 | 12 | 13 | 14 | 15 | 16 | 17 | 18 | 19 | 20 | 21 | 22 | Ladder | F1 | F2 | F3 | GF |
|---|---|---|---|---|---|---|---|---|---|---|---|---|---|---|---|---|---|---|---|---|---|---|---|---|---|---|---|
| Adelaide | **WB** **−23** | COL −11 | **GEE** **−11** | WC −114 | BL −30 | **HAW** **+86** | PA +7 | STK +40 | **KAN** **−3** | ESS −48 | **MEL** **+35** | **SYD** **+50** | RIC +9 | **FRE** **+73** | CAR −24 | WB −61 | **COL** **+38** | GEE −7 | **WC** **+17** | **BL** **−37** | HAW −31 | **PA** **−47** | 11 (9–13–0) | | | | |
| Brisbane Lions | CAR −40 | WB +29 | HAW −7 | PA −43 | **ADE** **+30** | STK +39 | FRE −11 | **ESS** **−64** | **COL** **+29** | MEL −18 | SYD +3 | **RIC** **−12** | **WC** **+84** | KAN −4 | GEE +69 | **CAR** **−44** | **WB** **+57** | **HAW** **−18** | **PA** **+67** | ADE +37 | **STK** **+90** | **FRE** **+107** | 6 (12–10–0) | **WB** **+34** | CAR −82 | | |
| Carlton | **BL** **+40** | **HAW** **+42** | COL −73 | WB −39 | ESS −24 | **PA** **+91** | RIC +51 | **SYD** **+45** | FRE +65 | STK +25 | **KAN** **+30** | WC +50 | MEL +98 | **GEE** **+10** | **ADE** **+24** | BL +44 | HAW +57 | **COL** **+111** | **WB** **−3** | **ESS** **−26** | PA −5 | **RIC** **+73** | 2 (16–6–0) | **MEL** **−9** | **BL** **+82** | ESS −45 | |
| Collingwood | HAW +54 | **ADE** **+11** | **CAR** **+73** | SYD +5 | WB +8 | **KAN** **−32** | **ESS** **−40** | **FRE** **−22** | BL −29 | RIC −48 | **WC** **−36** | **GEE** **−4** | PA −14 | MEL −65 | **STK** **+33** | **HAW** **−57** | ADE −38 | CAR −111 | **SYD** **−20** | **WB** **−9** | KAN +18 | ESS −19 | 15 (7–15–0) | | | | |
| Essendon | **PA** **+94** | **RIC** **+43** | FRE +36 | HAW +47 | **CAR** **+24** | WB +63 | COL +40 | BL +64 | MEL +13 | **ADE** **+48** | GEE +58 | **STK** **+86** | **KAN** **+49** | SYD +13 | **WC** **+32** | PA +31 | RIC +101 | **FRE** **+87** | **HAW** **+83** | CAR +26 | **WB** **−11** | **COL** **+19** | 1 (21–1–0) | **KAN** **+125** | X | **CAR** **+45** | **MEL** **+60** |
| Fremantle | **GEE** **−22** | PA +38 | **ESS** **−36** | RIC +1 | **MEL** **−31** | WC −117 | **BL** **+11** | COL +22 | **CAR** **−65** | KAN −88 | **WB** **−93** | HAW −59 | **STK** **+44** | ADE −73 | **SYD** **+27** | GEE −6 | **PA** **+18** | ESS −87 | **RIC** **−27** | MEL −83 | **WC** **+1** | BL −107 | 12 (8–14–0) | | | | |
| Geelong | FRE +22 | **STK** **+40** | ADE +11 | KAN −5 | **WC** **+81** | **MEL** **+25** | SYD +9 | **RIC** **−70** | HAW −25 | PA; 0 | **ESS** **−58** | COL +4 | **WB** **+7** | CAR −10 | **BL** **−69** | **FRE** **+6** | STK −24 | **ADE** **+7** | **KAN** **−39** | WC +30 | MEL −18 | **SYD** **+4** | 5 (12–9–1) | **HAW** **−9** | | | |
| Hawthorn | **COL** **−54** | CAR −42 | **BL** **+7** | **ESS** **−47** | PA +39 | ADE −86 | **WB** **+31** | KAN +61 | **GEE** **+25** | WC −30 | **RIC** **−3** | **FRE** **+59** | SYD −31 | STK +85 | **MEL** **−69** | COL +57 | **CAR** **−57** | BL +18 | ESS −83 | **PA** **+21** | **ADE** **+31** | WB +15 | 8 (12–10–0) | GEE +9 | KAN −10 | | |
| Kangaroos | **WC** **−43** | MEL −25 | RIC +36 | **GEE** **+5** | **SYD** **+8** | COL +32 | STK +12 | **HAW** **−61** | ADE +3 | **FRE** **+88** | CAR −30 | **PA** **+17** | ESS −49 | **BL** **+4** | WB −4 | WC +61 | **MEL** **+1** | **RIC** **+78** | GEE +39 | SYD −54 | **COL** **−18** | **STK** **+43** | 4 (14–8–0) | ESS −125 | **HAW** **+10** | MEL −50 | |
| Melbourne | RIC −2 | **KAN** **+25** | SYD −12 | **STK** **+90** | FRE +31 | GEE −25 | **WC** **+61** | PA +25 | **ESS** **−13** | **BL** **+18** | ADE −35 | WB −25 | **CAR** **−98** | **COL** **+65** | HAW +69 | **RIC** **+10** | KAN −1 | **SYD** **+26** | STK +18 | **FRE** **+83** | **GEE** **+18** | WC +70 | 3 (14–8–0) | CAR +9 | X | **KAN** **+50** | ESS −60 |
| Port Adelaide | ESS −94 | **FRE** **−38** | WB −47 | **BL** **+43** | **HAW** **−39** | CAR −91 | **ADE** **−7** | **MEL** **−25** | SYD −26 | **GEE**; **0** | STK −62 | KAN −17 | **COL** **+14** | WC +36 | **RIC** **+28** | **ESS** **−31** | FRE −18 | **WB** **+43** | BL −67 | HAW −21 | **CAR** **+5** | ADE +47 | 14 (7–14–1) | | | | |
| Richmond | **MEL** **+2** | ESS −43 | **KAN** **−36** | **FRE** **−1** | STK +26 | SYD +6 | **CAR** **−51** | GEE +70 | **WC** **+9** | **COL** **+48** | HAW +3 | BL +12 | **ADE** **−9** | **WB** **+35** | PA −28 | MEL −10 | **ESS** **−101** | KAN −78 | FRE +27 | **STK** **+40** | **SYD** **−1** | CAR −73 | 9 (11–11–0) | | | | |
| St Kilda | **SYD** **−34** | GEE −40 | **WC**; **0** | MEL −90 | **RIC** **−26** | **BL** **−39** | **KAN** **−12** | **ADE** **−40** | WB −1 | **CAR** **−27** | **PA** **+62** | ESS −86 | FRE −44 | **HAW** **−85** | COL −33 | SYD −28 | **GEE** **+24** | WC −86 | **MEL** **−18** | RIC −40 | BL −90 | KAN −43 | 16 (2–19–1) | | | | |
| Sydney | STK +34 | WC +12 | **MEL** **+12** | **COL** **−5** | KAN −8 | **RIC** **−6** | **GEE** **−9** | CAR −45 | **PA** **+26** | WB −58 | **BL** **−3** | ADE −50 | **HAW** **+31** | **ESS** **−13** | FRE −27 | **STK** **+28** | **WC** **+71** | MEL −26 | COL +20 | **KAN** **+54** | RIC +1 | GEE −4 | 10 (10–12–0) | | | | |
| West Coast | KAN +43 | **SYD** **−12** | STK; 0 | **ADE** **+114** | GEE −81 | **FRE** **+117** | MEL −61 | **WB** **+6** | RIC −9 | **HAW** **+30** | COL +36 | **CAR** **−50** | BL −84 | **PA** **−36** | ESS −32 | **KAN** **−61** | SYD −71 | **STK** **+86** | ADE −17 | **GEE** **−30** | FRE −1 | **MEL** **−70** | 13 (7–14–1) | | | | |
| Western Bulldogs | ADE +23 | **BL** **−29** | **PA** **+47** | **CAR** **+39** | **COL** **−8** | **ESS** **−63** | HAW −31 | WC −6 | **STK** **+1** | **SYD** **+58** | FRE +93 | **MEL** **+25** | GEE −7 | RIC −35 | **KAN** **+4** | **ADE** **+61** | BL −57 | PA −43 | CAR +3 | COL +9 | ESS +11 | **HAW** **−15** | 7 (12–10–0) | BL −34 | | | |

Source: AFL Tables

== Season notes ==
- Essendon became the first team in VFL/AFL history to win 21 matches in a home-and-away season.
- By winning the grand final, Essendon set a new record for the most wins in a season (24); the club also set a new record for the highest average winning margin in a season (51 points).
- Due to a major upgrade of the Gabba, the Brisbane Lions played their first four regular season games away from home. They were also the only non-Victorian club to qualify for the finals.
- This is the season when the current finals format was introduced.

== Awards ==
=== Major awards ===
- The Brownlow Medal was awarded to Shane Woewodin of Melbourne.
- The Coleman Medal was awarded to Matthew Lloyd of Essendon.
- The Norm Smith Medal was awarded to James Hird of Essendon.
- The AFL Rising Star was awarded to Paul Hasleby of Fremantle.
- The wooden spoon was "awarded" to St Kilda.

=== Leading goalkickers ===
| 1 | Led the goalkicking at the end of the round |
| 1 | Led the goalkicking at the end of the home-and-away season |
| 1_{1} | Subscript indicates the player's goal tally to that point of the season |
| – | Did not play during that round |
| X | Had a bye during that round |

| # | Player | Team | Home-and-away season (Coleman Medal) | | | | | | | | | | | | | | | | | | | | | | Finals series | | | | Total | Games | Average |
| # | Player | Team | 1 | 2 | 3 | 4 | 5 | 6 | 7 | 8 | 9 | 10 | 11 | 12 | 13 | 14 | 15 | 16 | 17 | 18 | 19 | 20 | 21 | 22 | F1 | F2 | F3 | GF | Total | Games | Average |
|---|---|---|---|---|---|---|---|---|---|---|---|---|---|---|---|---|---|---|---|---|---|---|---|---|---|---|---|---|---|---|---|
| 1 | Matthew Lloyd | Essendon | 7_{7} | 7_{14} | 4_{18} | 4_{22} | 3_{25} | 3_{28} | 5_{33} | 5_{38} | 6_{44} | 1_{45} | 7_{52} | 6_{58} | 1_{59} | 4_{63} | 3_{66} | 3_{69} | 4_{73} | 9_{82} | 5_{87} | 1_{88} | 2_{90} | 4_{94} | 7_{101} | X_{101} | 4_{105} | 4_{109} | 109 | 25 | 4.36 |
| 2 | Jeff Farmer | Melbourne | 2_{2} | 1_{3} | 3_{6} | 5_{11} | 1_{12} | 4_{16} | 7_{23} | –_{23} | –_{23} | 3_{26} | 2_{28} | 1_{29} | 0_{29} | 9_{38} | 7_{45} | 2_{47} | 1_{48} | 4_{52} | 2_{54} | 8_{62} | 0_{62} | 3_{65} | 0_{65} | X_{65} | 8_{73} | 3_{76} | 76 | 23 | 3.30 |
| 3 | Lance Whitnall | Carlton | 1_{1} | 5_{6} | 5_{11} | 1_{12} | 4_{16} | 4_{20} | 2_{22} | 0_{22} | 0_{22} | 3_{25} | 2_{27} | 3_{30} | 3_{33} | 6_{39} | 6_{45} | 9_{54} | 1_{55} | 5_{60} | 0_{60} | 3_{63} | 0_{63} | 2_{65} | 3_{68} | 2_{70} | 0_{70} | | 70 | 25 | 2.80 |
| 4 | Wayne Carey | Kangaroos | 2_{2} | –_{2} | 2_{4} | 0_{4} | 3_{7} | 4_{11} | 1_{12} | –_{12} | 6_{18} | 7_{25} | 1_{26} | 5_{31} | 1_{32} | 5_{37} | 3_{40} | 2_{42} | 5_{47} | 4_{51} | 3_{54} | 4_{58} | 1_{59} | 3_{62} | 1_{63} | 3_{66} | 3_{69} | | 69 | 23 | 3.00 |
| 5 | Alastair Lynch | Brisbane Lions | –_{0} | 0_{0} | 4_{4} | 3_{7} | 5_{12} | 2_{14} | 0_{14} | –_{14} | 4_{18} | 6_{24} | 5_{29} | 3_{32} | 4_{36} | 2_{38} | 3_{41} | 4_{45} | 2_{47} | 2_{49} | 3_{52} | 2_{54} | 3_{57} | 4_{61} | 5_{66} | 2_{68} | | | 68 | 22 | 3.09 |
| 6 | Scott Lucas | Essendon | –_{0} | –_{0} | 2_{2} | 5_{7} | 3_{10} | 6_{16} | 6_{22} | 1_{23} | 1_{24} | 3_{27} | 4_{31} | 0_{31} | 3_{34} | 2_{36} | 1_{37} | 3_{40} | 2_{42} | 5_{47} | 4_{51} | 0_{51} | 0_{51} | 2_{53} | 2_{55} | X_{55} | 2_{57} | 0_{57} | 57 | 23 | 2.48 |
| 7 | Daniel Bradshaw | Brisbane Lions | 4_{4} | 7_{11} | 2_{13} | 3_{16} | 0_{16} | 3_{19} | 0_{19} | 0_{19} | –_{19} | –_{19} | –_{19} | –_{19} | 7_{26} | 3_{29} | 4_{33} | 4_{37} | 5_{42} | 1_{43} | 5_{48} | 4_{52} | 2_{54} | 2_{56} | 0_{56} | –_{56} | | | 56 | 19 | 2.95 |
| 8 | Clive Waterhouse | Fremantle | 2_{2} | 3_{5} | 1_{6} | 2_{8} | 1_{9} | 2_{11} | 2_{13} | 4_{17} | 6_{23} | 1_{24} | 4_{28} | 1_{29} | –_{29} | 4_{33} | 5_{38} | 0_{38} | 2_{40} | 0_{40} | 2_{42} | 3_{45} | 7_{52} | 1_{53} | | | | | 53 | 21 | 2.52 |
| 8 | Michael O'Loughlin | Sydney | 5_{5} | 0_{5} | 3_{8} | 0_{8} | 2_{10} | 2_{12} | 0_{12} | 0_{12} | 1_{13} | 1_{14} | 3_{17} | 0_{17} | 5_{22} | 3_{25} | 1_{26} | 4_{30} | 2_{32} | 3_{35} | 6_{41} | 4_{45} | 3_{48} | 5_{53} | | | | | 53 | 22 | 2.41 |
| 10 | Luke Power | Brisbane Lions | 1_{1} | 1_{2} | 1_{3} | 0_{3} | –_{3} | 3_{6} | 1_{7} | 1_{8} | 6_{14} | 2_{16} | 3_{19} | 5_{24} | 2_{26} | 2_{28} | 3_{31} | 2_{33} | 1_{34} | 3_{37} | 1_{38} | 3_{41} | 3_{44} | 3_{47} | 5_{52} | –_{52} | | | 52 | 22 | 2.36 |
| | Peter Everitt | St Kilda | 4_{4} | 9_{13} | 7_{20} | 3_{23} | 5_{28} | 3_{31} | 0_{31} | 3_{34} | 2_{36} | 0_{36} | 3_{39} | 0_{39} | –_{39} | –_{39} | –_{39} | –_{39} | –_{39} | –_{39} | –_{39} | 0_{39} | 0_{39} | 1_{40} | | | | | 40 | 15 | 2.67 |

Source: AFL Tables

== Sources ==
- 2000 AFL season at AFL Tables
- 2000 AFL season at Australian Football
