= List of AFL debuts in 1999 =

This is a listing of Australian rules footballers who made their senior debut for an Australian Football League (AFL) club in 1999.

== Debuts ==
Name	Club	Age at debut	Round debuted	Games	Goals	Notes
Brett Burton	Adelaide	20 years, 327 days	1	177	264	
Ken McGregor	Adelaide	18 years, 156 days	14	152	114	
Tyson Stenglein	Adelaide	18 years, 304 days	8	106	26	
Bryan Beinke	Adelaide	23 years, 241 days	2	38	42	
David Gallagher	Adelaide	18 years, 234 days	1	26	2	
Lucas Herbert	Adelaide	21 years, 195 days	1	14	1	
Matthew Golding	Adelaide	18 years, 116 days	5	7	0	
Brodie Atkinson	Adelaide	26 years, 239 days	1	5	1	1997 Magarey Medallist. Previously played for St Kilda.
Darryl Wintle	Adelaide	22 years, 361 days	2	3	1	
Dean Howard	Adelaide	22 years, 310 days	10	2	0	
Des Headland	Brisbane Lions	18 years, 157 days	13	52	52	
Adam Heuskes	Brisbane Lions	23 years, 7 days	1	7	0	Previously played for Sydney and Port Adelaide.
David Calthorpe	Brisbane Lions	25 years, 236 days	3	9	2	Previously played for Essendon.
Martin McKinnon	Brisbane Lions	23 years, 300 days	6	7	5	Previously played for Adelaide and Geelong.
Matthew Lappin	Carlton	23 years, 36 days	1	196	221	Previously played for St Kilda.
Brendan Fevola	Carlton	18 years, 186 days	17	187	575	2006 and 2009 Coleman Medallist.
Simon Fletcher	Carlton	20 years, 335 days	16	84	30	
Brett Backwell	Carlton	18 years, 311 days	1	18	12	2006 Magarey Medallist.
Heath Culpitt	Carlton	21 years, 54 days	3	15	5	
Murray Vance	Carlton	19 years, 111 days	18	5	1	
Ben Thompson	Carlton	20 years, 172 days	1	1	0	
Tarkyn Lockyer	Collingwood	19 years, 197 days	8	227	149	
Paul Licuria	Collingwood	21 years, 83 days	1	182	70	Previously played for Sydney.
Rupert Betheras	Collingwood	23 years, 139 days	3	85	35	
Glenn Freeborn	Collingwood	26 years, 50 days	1	83	42	Previously played for North Melbourne.
Nick Davis	Collingwood	18 years, 363 days	13	71	85	Son of Craig Davis.
Heath Scotland	Collingwood	18 years, 264 days	3	53	12	
Tyson Lane	Collingwood	22 years, 215 days	1	42	30	Previously played for the Western Bulldogs.
Craig Jacotine	Collingwood	18 years, 308 days	5	16	6	
Rick Olarenshaw	Collingwood	26 years, 55 days	1	5	0	Previously played for Essendon.
Brad Oborne	Collingwood	18 years, 317 days	6	5	4	Son of Rod Oborne.
Cameron Venables	Collingwood	23 years, 150 days	1	3	0	
Mark McVeigh	Essendon	18 years, 58 days	1	232	107	Brother of Jarrad McVeigh.
Mark Johnson	Essendon	20 years, 306 days	1	194	92	Brother of David Johnson.
Adam Ramanauskas	Essendon	18 years, 176 days	8	134	63	
Dean Rioli	Essendon	20 years, 325 days	3	100	91	
Danny Jacobs	Essendon	19 years, 9 days	14	81	23	
Ilija Grgic	Essendon	27 years, 27 days	2	2	0	Previously played for Footscray and West Coast.
Antoni Grover	Fremantle	19 years, 163 days	21	202	27	
Justin Longmuir	Fremantle	18 years, 220 days	22	139	166	Brother of Troy Longmuir.
Tony Modra	Fremantle	30 years, 27 days	1	47	148	1997 Coleman Medallist. Previously played for Adelaide.
Ashley Prescott	Fremantle	30 years, 27 days	1	38	4	Son of David Prescott. Previously played for Richmond.
Andrew Shipp	Fremantle	19 years, 285 days	9	35	19	
Garth Taylor	Fremantle	18 years, 261 days	1	15	13	
Darren Bolton	Fremantle	22 years, 135 days	3	2	0	
Michael Clark	Fremantle	21 years, 74 days	11	1	0	Son of Wayne Clark. Played first-class cricket for Western Australia and Warwickshire.
Tom Harley	Geelong	20 years, 351 days	14	197	11	Premiership captain 2007 and 2009. Previously played for Port Adelaide.
David Wojcinski	Geelong	18 years, 212 days	4	203	66	
David Clarke	Geelong	19 years, 8 days	9	89	48	Son of David Clarke and brother of Tim Clarke.
Jason Mooney	Geelong	25 years, 294 days	1	32	50	Brother of Cameron Mooney. Previously played for Sydney.
Simon Arnott	Geelong	23 years, 40 days	1	26	20	Previously played for Sydney.
Tristan Lynch	Geelong	25 years, 216 days	1	17	7	Previously played for Brisbane.
Scott Bamford	Geelong	24 years, 276 days	1	13	10	Previously played for Fitzroy and Brisbane.
Paul Lindsay	Geelong	23 years, 110 days	12	2	0	
Joel Smith	Hawthorn	21 years, 335 days	2	163	39	Previously played for St Kilda.
Kris Barlow	Hawthorn	25 years, 256 days	1	102	74	
Adrian Cox	Hawthorn	18 years, 201 days	1	54	27	
Anthony Rock	Hawthorn	28 years, 214 days	6	44	17	Previously played for North Melbourne.
Glen Bowyer	Hawthorn	19 years, 224 days	22	35	14	
Michael Collica	Hawthorn	21 years, 262 days	22	30	4	
Brett O'Farrell	Hawthorn	21 years, 90 days	2	13	6	Previously played for Sydney.
Peter Walsh	Melbourne	22 years, 254 days	2	104	31	
Luke Williams	Melbourne	19 years, 206 days	17	51	10	
Troy Simmonds	Melbourne	20 years, 313 days	9	40	7	
Ben Beams	Melbourne	20 years, 250 days	5	23	17	
Scott Chisholm	Melbourne	25 years, 303 days	1	18	8	Previously played for Fremantle.
Luke Ottens	Melbourne	22 years, 309 days	1	4	0	Son of Dean Ottens and brother of Brad Ottens.
Nick Carter	Melbourne	21 years, 10 days	1	3	1	Previously played for Fitzroy and Brisbane.
Brady Rawlings	Kangaroos	17 years, 295 days	3	245	62	Brother of Jade Rawlings.
Shane Clayton	Kangaroos	20 years, 153 days	1	99	51	Previously played for Fitzroy and Brisbane. Brother of Jeremy Clayton.
Shannon Motlop	Kangaroos	20 years, 292 days	10	54	31	Brother of Daniel and Steven Motlop.
Adam Lange	Kangaroos	20 years, 79 days	2	28	22	
Gary Dhurrkay	Kangaroos	25 years, 22 days	1	21	20	Previously played for Fremantle.
Kent Kingsley	Kangaroos	20 years, 253 days	10	12	10	
Cameron Mooney	Kangaroos	19 years, 225 days	7	11	2	Brother of Jason Mooney.
Chad Cornes	Port Adelaide	19 years, 171 days	6	239	175	Son of Graham Cornes and brother of Kane Cornes.
Jarrad Schofield	Port Adelaide	24 years, 57 days	1	131	91	Previously played for West Coast.
Jared Poulton	Port Adelaide	21 years, 341 days	1	88	20	
Che Cockatoo-Collins	Port Adelaide	24 years, 23 days	1	75	106	Brother of David and Donald Cockatoo-Collins. Previously played for Essendon.
Barnaby French	Port Adelaide	23 years, 121 days	1	62	20	
Derek Murray	Port Adelaide	19 years, 30 days	5	23	7	Brother of Allan Murray.
Michael Stevens	Port Adelaide	18 years, 259 days	17	17	3	
Scott Bassett	Port Adelaide	20 years, 266 days	14	15	2	Brother of Nathan Bassett.
Ray Hall	Richmond	18 years, 304 days	22	99	28	
Rory Hilton	Richmond	19 years, 346 days	1	82	53	Previously played for Brisbane.
Marc Dragicevic	Richmond	18 years, 4 days	2	48	25	
Craig Biddiscombe	Richmond	22 years, 237 days	8	44	7	Previously played for Geelong.
Clay Sampson	Richmond	23 years, 58 days	5	27	18	Previously played for Melbourne and Adelaide.
Ben Hollands	Richmond	21 years, 109 days	6	8	5	
Lenny Hayes	St Kilda	19 years, 100 days	6	297	95	St Kilda captain 2004 and 2007.
Steven Baker	St Kilda	18 years, 317 days	2	203	35	
James Begley	St Kilda	19 years, 23 days	20	36	7	
Damien Ryan	St Kilda	21 years, 236 days	1	30	3	Previously played for Richmond.
Matthew Carr	St Kilda	20 years, 109 days	4	28	2	Brother of Josh Carr.
Ben Walton	St Kilda	19 years, 135 days	1	23	15	
Tony Francis	St Kilda	29 years, 360 days	1	19	5	Previously played for Collingwood.
James Gowans	St Kilda	22 years, 119 days	15	4	2	
Adam Goodes	Sydney	19 years, 79 days	1	351	439	2003 and 2006 Brownlow Medallists.
Jude Bolton	Sydney	19 years, 97 days	12	325	196	
Brett Kirk	Sydney	22 years, 286 days	19	241	96	
Nic Fosdike	Sydney	19 years, 58 days	5	164	66	
Gerrard Bennett	Sydney	20 years, 1 days	3	32	11	
Ryan O'Connor	Sydney	24 years, 274 days	1	24	2	2001 Magarey Medallist. Previously played for Essendon.
Heath James	Sydney	19 years, 153 days	19	18	1	Son of Max James.
Scott Russell	Sydney	28 years, 325 days	1	16	8	Previously played for Collingwood.
Andrew Bomford	Sydney	24 years, 252 days	1	15	4	Previously played for Essendon.
Simon Feast	Sydney	24 years, 145 days	5	14	3	
Fred Campbell	Sydney	19 years, 153 days	8	5	3	
Will Sangster	Sydney	20 years, 210 days	7	2	0	
Andrew Embley	West Coast	17 years, 274 days	1	250	216	2006 Norm Smith Medallist.
Chad Fletcher	West Coast	19 years, 313 days	15	179	74	
Scott Cummings	West Coast	25 years, 69 days	1	46	158	1999 Coleman Medallist. Previously played for Essendon and Port Adelaide.
Chad Rintoul	West Coast	24 years, 240 days	1	39	10	Previously played for Adelaide.
Laurie Bellotti	West Coast	23 years, 42 days	3	24	2	
Matthew Robbins	Footscray	22 years, 0 days	7	139	135	Previously played for Geelong.
Kingsley Hunter	Footscray	24 years, 23 days	12	57	28	Previously played for Fremantle.
Nicky Winmar	Footscray	33 years, 183 days	1	21	34	Previously played for St Kilda.
Josh Mahoney	Footscray	21 years, 147 days	1	11	2	Previously played for Collingwood.
Jim Plunkett	Footscray	20 years, 328 days	12	10	1	
Christin Macri	Footscray	24 years, 38 days	18	5	3	
