= List of Adelaide Football Club players =

This is a list of players to have played for the Adelaide Football Club in the Australian Football League (AFL) and the AFL Women's (AFLW), the two pre-eminent competitions of Australian rules football. Andrew McLeod has played the most games for the club, with 340 games from 1995 to 2010, while Taylor Walker has scored the most goals, with 715 between 2009 and 2026.

Players are listed by the date of their AFL/AFLW debut with the club. In cases of players debuting in the same game, they are listed alphabetically.

== Men's players ==
Key
Order	Players are listed according to the date of their debut for the club.
Seasons	The yearspan of the player's appearances for Adelaide.
Debut	Players' first AFL matches for Adelaide.
Games	The number of games played.
Goals	The number of goals scored.
^{^}	Player is currently on Adelaide's playing list.
+	Inducted into the Adelaide Football Club Hall of Fame.
†	Inducted into the Australian Football Hall of Fame.
‡	Inducted into the Adelaide Football Club Hall of Fame and the Australian Football Hall of Fame.
Statistics are correct to the end of the 2026 season.

=== 1990s ===
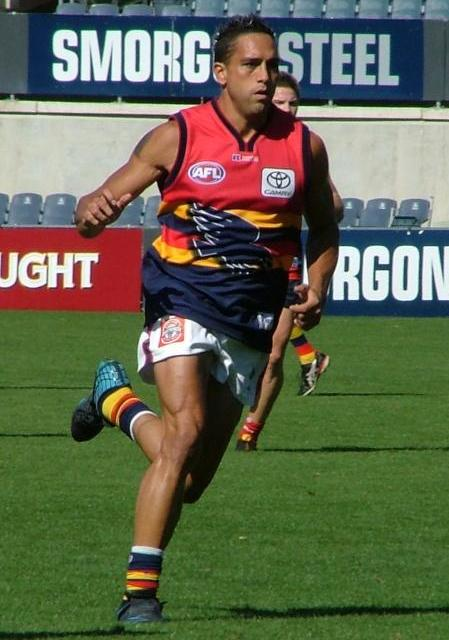
Andrew McLeod is a two-time Norm Smith Medallist and Adelaide's games record holder.

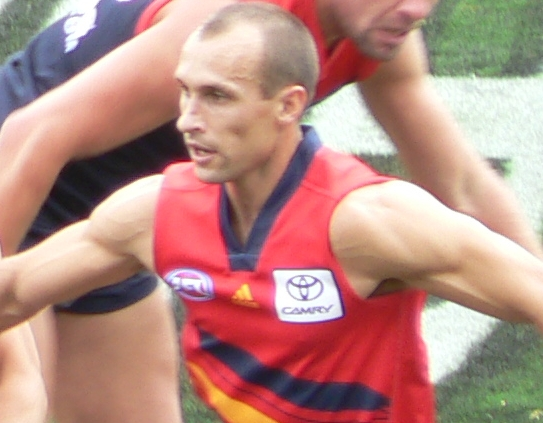
Tyson Edwards was a two-time premiership player across his 321 games.

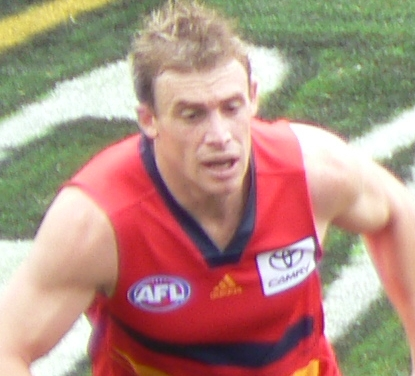
Simon Goodwin is a three-time Malcolm Blight Medallist and a former captain of the club.

Cap	Name	Seasons	Debut	Games	Goals
1	(South Australia) Grantley Fielke	1991–1992	round 1, 1991	24	6
2	(South Australia) Darel Hart	1991–1992	round 1, 1991	39	38
3	(South Australia) Eddie Hocking	1991	round 1, 1991	11	4
4	(South Australia) Rod Jameson	1991–1999	round 1, 1991	153	113
5	(South Australia) Andrew Jarman	1991–1996	round 1, 1991	110	92
6	(Tasmania) John Klug	1991–1992	round 1, 1991	26	34
7	(Victoria (state)) Scott Lee	1991–1995	round 1, 1991	86	18
8	(South Australia) Bruce Lindner	1991–1992	round 1, 1991	19	27
9	(South Australia) Bruce Lindsay	1991	round 1, 1991	6	0
10	(South Australia) David Marshall	1991–1992	round 1, 1991	26	14
11	(South Australia) Rodney Maynard	1991–1995	round 1, 1991	81	24
12	(South Australia) Chris McDermott ‡	1991–1996	round 1, 1991	117	25
13	(South Australia) Tony McGuinness	1991–1996	round 1, 1991	113	79
14	(New South Wales) Peter McIntyre	1991–1992	round 1, 1991	14	19
15	(South Australia) Romano Negri	1991–1992	round 1, 1991	6	0
16	(South Australia) Nigel Smart +	1991–2004	round 1, 1991	278	116
17	(South Australia) Darren Smith	1991–1992	round 1, 1991	9	10
18	(South Australia) Robbie Thompson	1991	round 1, 1991	5	0
19	(South Australia) Simon Tregenza	1991–1998	round 1, 1991	106	16
20	(South Australia) Tom Warhurst	1991	round 1, 1991	2	0
21	(South Australia) Allan Bartlett	1991	round 2, 1991	11	3
22	(South Australia) Scott Hodges	1991–1993; 1996	round 2, 1991	38	100
23	(South Australia) Michael Murphy	1991–1992	round 2, 1991	16	41
24	(Tasmania) Bruce Abernethy	1991–1992	round 3, 1991	11	2
25	(South Australia) Danny Hughes	1991	round 3, 1991	11	1
26	(Western Australia) Stephen Rowe	1991–1995	round 3, 1991	29	24
27	(South Australia) Mark Bickley ‡	1991–2003	round 4, 1991	272	77
28	(South Australia) Mark Mickan	1991–1993	round 4, 1991	37	12
29	(South Australia) Clayton Lamb	1991	round 5, 1991	1	1
30	(South Australia) Matthew Liptak	1991–1999	round 9, 1991	116	128
31	(South Australia) David Brown	1991–1996	round 12, 1991	69	55
32	(South Australia) Sean Tasker	1991–1996	round 15, 1991	48	17
33	(South Australia) Matthew Kelly	1991–1992	round 16, 1991	2	0
34	(South Australia) Wayne Weidemann	1991–1996	round 16, 1991	68	26
35	(South Australia) Shaun Rehn +	1991–2000	round 18, 1991	134	55
36	(South Australia) Andrew Payze	1991–1992	round 19, 1991	14	2
37	(South Australia) Paul Patterson	1991–1993	round 22, 1991	9	2
38	(South Australia) Ben Hart ‡	1992–2006	round 1, 1992	311	45
39	(South Australia) Anthony Ingerson	1992–1995	round 1, 1992	37	25
40	(South Australia) Randall Bone	1992–1993	round 3, 1992	12	13
41	(South Australia) Tony Modra +	1992–1998	round 4, 1992	118	440
42	(South Australia) Jonathon Ross	1992–1996	round 5, 1992	20	4
43	(South Australia) Stephen Schwerdt	1992–1994	round 5, 1992	25	4
44	(South Australia) Brenton Sanderson	1992–1993	round 6, 1992	6	4
45	(South Australia) Adam Saliba	1992	round 15, 1992	3	2
46	(South Australia) David Pittman	1992–1999	round 18, 1992	131	34
47	(South Australia) Paul Rouvray	1992–1994	round 19, 1992	21	2
48	(South Australia) Greg Anderson	1993–1996	round 1, 1993	59	19
49	(South Australia) Chris Groom	1993–1994	round 1, 1993	12	8
50	(South Australia) Matthew Robran	1993–2001	round 5, 1993	130	110
51	(South Australia) Mark Ricciuto ‡	1993–2007	round 6, 1993	312	292
52	(South Australia) Mark Viska	1993–1997	round 10, 1993	33	1
53	(South Australia) Matthew Powell	1993–1995	round 13, 1993	16	4
54	(Victoria (state)) Stuart Wigney	1993–1994	round 21, 1993	10	20
55	(South Australia) Tony Hall	1994–1995	round 1, 1994	17	30
56	(South Australia) Brett Chalmers	1994–1997	round 4, 1994	50	8
57	(South Australia) Shane Tongerie	1994	round 1, 1994	4	3
58	(South Australia) Sean Wellman	1994–1995	round 6, 1994	34	9
59	(South Australia) Peter Turner	1994	round 8, 1994	3	1
60	(South Australia) Josh Mail	1994	round 10, 1994	4	0
61	(South Australia) Matthew Kluzek	1994–1996	round 15, 1994	24	15
62	(South Australia) Martin McKinnon	1994–1995	round 16, 1994	25	7
63	(South Australia) Nick Pesch	1994–1996	round 17, 1994	31	15
64	(Western Australia) Matthew Connell	1995–2000	round 1, 1995	96	28
65	(Victoria (state)) Jason McCartney	1995–1997	round 1, 1995	37	20
66	(Northern Territory) Andrew McLeod ‡	1995–2010	round 6, 1995	340	275
67	(South Australia) Tyson Edwards +	1995–2010	round 11, 1995	321	192
68	(South Australia) Troy Bond	1996–1999	round 1, 1996	58	51
69	(New South Wales) Peter Caven	1996–2000	round 1, 1996	82	34
70	(Victoria (state)) Shane Ellen	1996–2000	round 1, 1996	54	15
71	(South Australia) Darren Jarman ‡	1996–2001	round 1, 1996	121	264
72	(South Australia) Kym Koster	1996–2000	round 1, 1996	95	31
73	(Victoria (state)) Matthew Collins	1996–1997	round 10, 1996	14	2
74	(Victoria (state)) Kane Johnson	1996–2002	round 14, 1996	104	44
75	(South Australia) Peter Vardy	1996–2001	round 14, 1996	96	150
76	(Victoria (state)) Ashley Fernee	1996	round 17, 1996	2	0
77	(South Australia) Simon Goodwin ‡	1997–2010	round 1, 1997	275	162
78	(South Australia) Brett James	1997–2000	round 1, 1997	76	26
79	(Queensland) Aaron Keating	1997–1998	round 1, 1997	6	1
80	(Western Australia) Chad Rintoul	1997–1998	round 1, 1997	23	16
81	(Victoria (state)) Barry Standfield	1997	round 1, 1997	13	23
82	(Victoria (state)) Brent Williams	1997	round 1, 1997	7	4
83	(South Australia) Tim Cook	1997–1998	round 2, 1997	8	5
84	(South Australia) Trent Ormond-Allen	1997–1999	round 2, 1997	42	2
85	(Victoria (state)) Tom Gilligan	1997	round 3, 1997	3	1
86	(South Australia) Clay Sampson	1997–1998	round 17, 1997	24	16
87	(South Australia) Nathan Bassett	1998–2008	round 1, 1998	210	25
88	(Victoria (state)) Lance Picioane	1998	round 1, 1998	4	2
89	(Victoria (state)) Mark Stevens	1998–2005	round 1, 1998	101	103
90	(Victoria (state)) James Thiessen	1998–2000	round 1, 1998	44	21
91	(Victoria (state)) Andrew Eccles	1998–2001	round 2, 1998	41	22
92	(Western Australia) Ian Downsborough	1998–1999	round 3, 1998	12	6
93	(Thailand) Sudjai Cook	1998	round 7, 1998	7	2
94	(Zimbabwe) Ian Perrie	1998–2007	round 13, 1998	116	129
95	(South Australia) Ben Marsh	1998–2003	round 14, 1998	48	17
96	(South Australia) Linden Stevens	1998	round 22, 1998	2	0
97	(South Australia) Brodie Atkinson	1999	round 1, 1999	5	1
98	(South Australia) Brett Burton	1999–2010	round 1, 1999	177	264
99	(Victoria (state)) David Gallagher	1999–2001	round 1, 1999	26	2
100	(South Australia) Lucas Herbert	1999	round 1, 1999	14	1
101	(South Australia) Bryan Beinke	1999–2002	round 2, 1999	38	42
102	(South Australia) Darryl Wintle	1999	round 2, 1999	3	0
103	(South Australia) Matthew Golding	1999	round 5, 1999	7	0
104	(Western Australia) Tyson Stenglein	1999–2004	round 8, 1999	106	26
105	(Queensland) Dean Howard	1999	round 10, 1999	2	0
106	(South Australia) Ken McGregor	1999–2008	round 14, 1999	152	114

=== 2000s ===
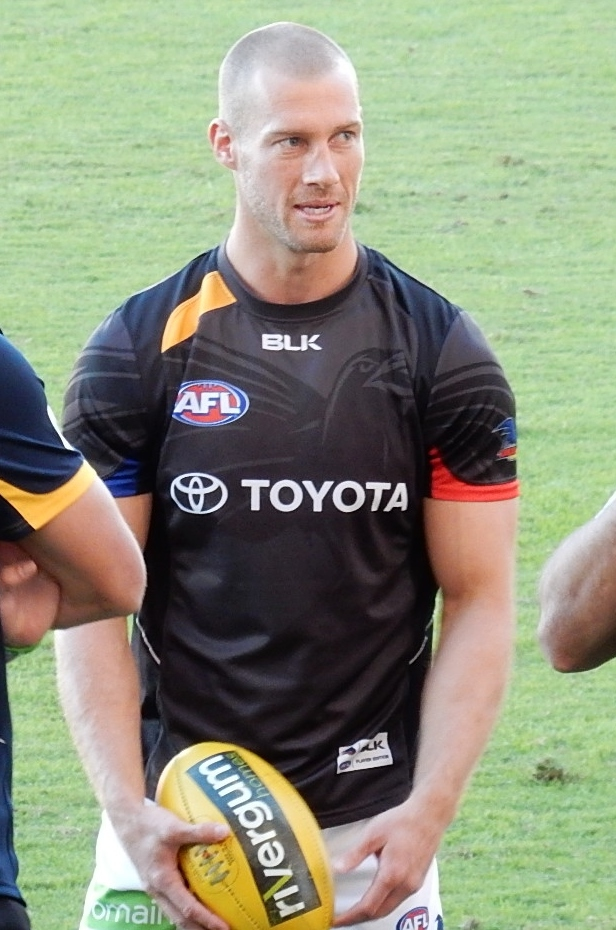
Scott Thompson is a two-time Malcolm Blight Medal winner.

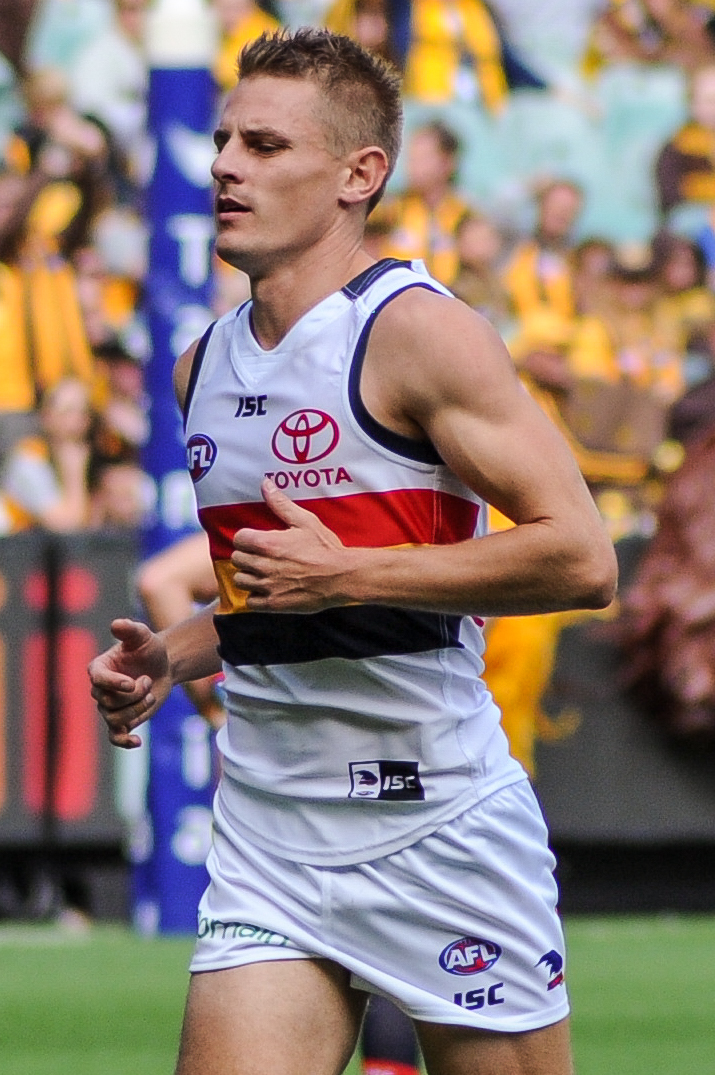
David Mackay played 248 games across three decades.

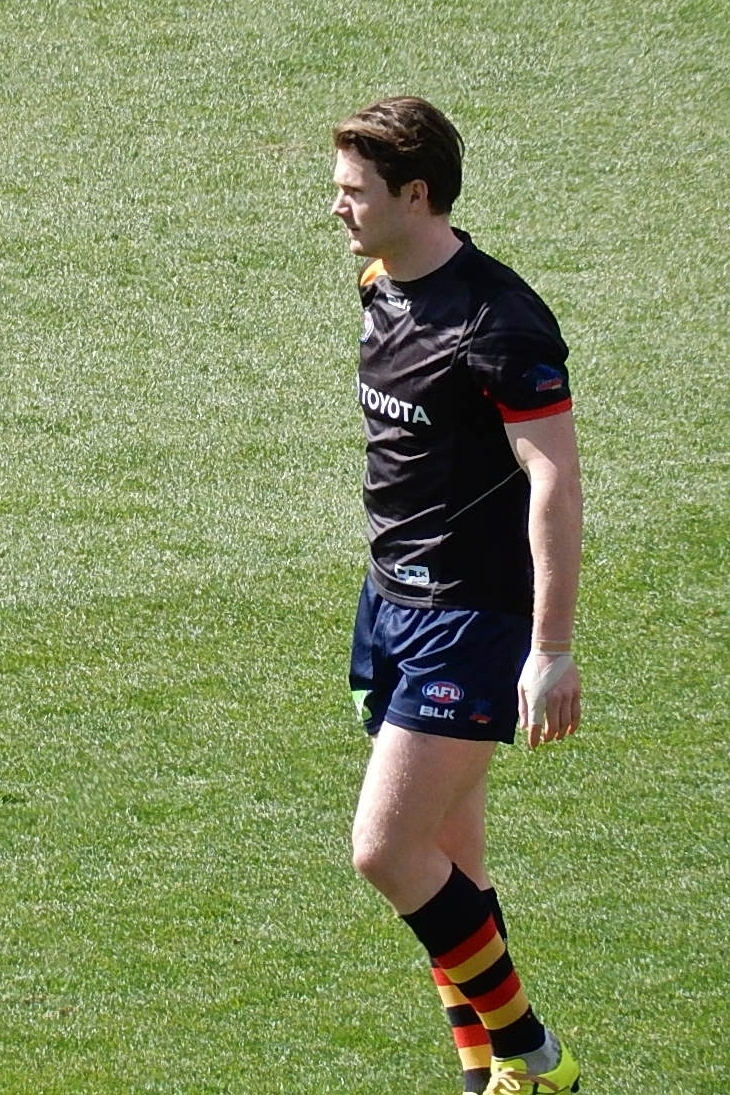
Patrick Dangerfield was a three-time All-Australian during his time at Adelaide.

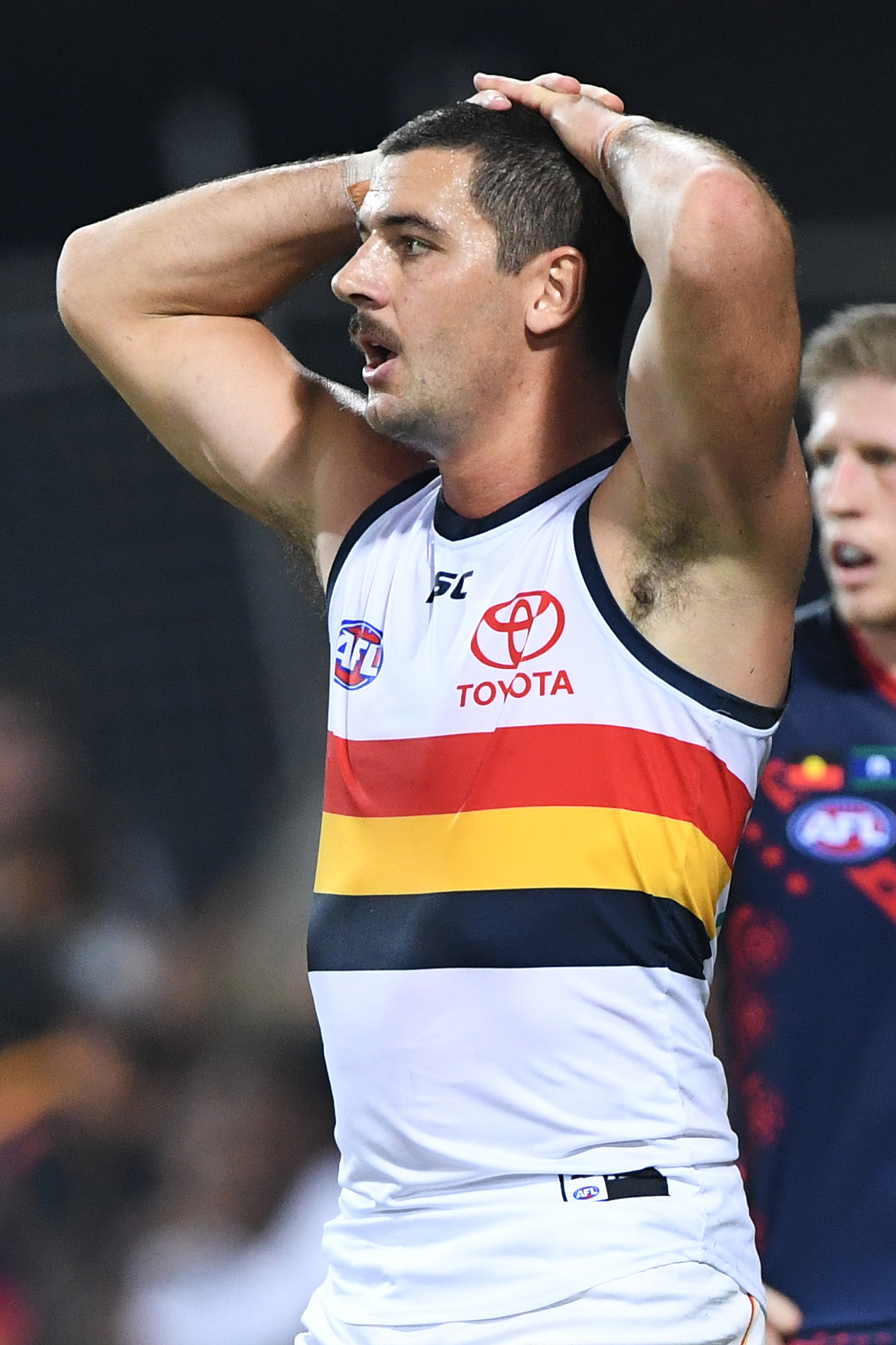
Taylor Walker is Adelaide's all-time leading goalscorer and a former captain.

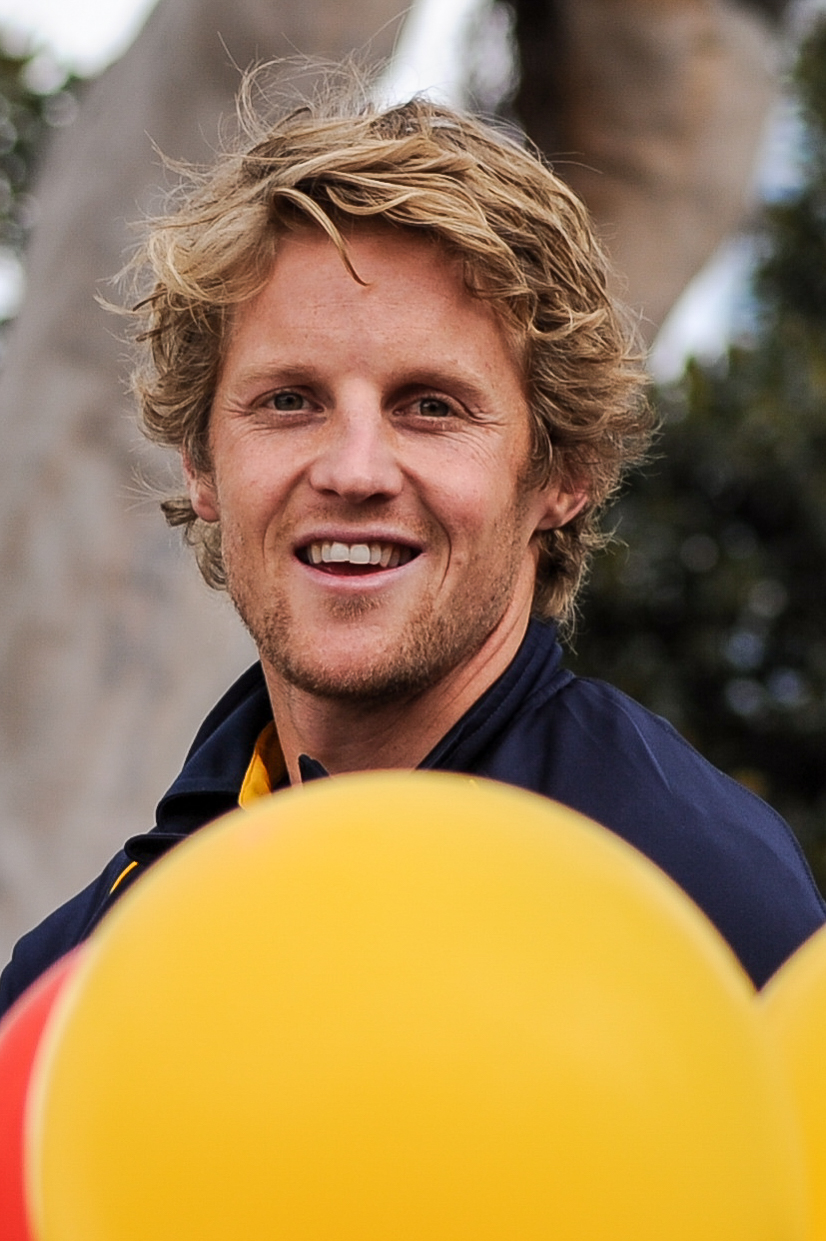
Rory Sloane is a two-time Malcolm Blight Medal winner and a former captain.

Cap	Name	Seasons	Debut	Games	Goals
107	(New South Wales) James Byrne	2000–2001	round 1, 2000	24	4
108	(New South Wales) Matthew Clarke	2000–2006	round 1, 2000	118	19
109	(South Australia) Andrew Crowell	2000–2003	round 1, 2000	44	15
110	(South Australia) Michael Doughty	2000–2012	round 1, 2000	231	46
111	(South Australia) Scott Welsh	2000–2007	round 1, 2000	129	270
112	(South Australia) Justin Cicolella	2000	round 3, 2000	5	1
113	(South Australia) Robert Shirley	2000–2009	round 3, 2000	151	28
114	(South Australia) Rhett Biglands	2000–2006	round 5, 2000	134	59
115	(South Australia) Ricky O'Loughlin	2000–2001	round 6, 2000	9	2
116	(Western Australia) Evan Hewitt	2001–2002	round 1, 2001	15	6
117	(South Australia) Chris Ladhams	2001–2004	round 1, 2001	54	37
118	(Victoria (state)) Matthew Shir	2001–2002	round 1, 2001	11	1
119	(South Australia) Hayden Skipworth	2001–2006	round 1, 2001	44	22
120	(South Australia) Matthew Bode	2001–2007	round 2, 2001	79	71
121	(New South Wales) Stuart Bown	2001	round 6, 2001	4	1
122	(Victoria (state)) Adam Richardson	2001	round 7, 2001	2	1
123	(South Australia) James Gallagher	2001–2004	round 12, 2001	38	11
124	(South Australia) Ryan Fitzgerald	2002	round 1, 2002	8	8
125	(South Australia) Graham Johncock	2002–2013	round 1, 2002	227	120
126	(South Australia) Ben Nelson	2002	round 1, 2002	12	1
127	(South Australia) Daniel Schell	2002–2003	round 1, 2002	11	9
128	(Sweden) Kris Massie	2002–2008	round 5, 2002	88	11
129	(South Australia) Martin Mattner	2002–2007	round 14, 2002	98	14
130	(Victoria (state)) Brent Reilly	2002–2015	round 15, 2002	203	52
131	(New South Wales) Wayne Carey †	2003–2004	round 1, 2003	28	56
132	(South Australia) Jason Torney	2003–2007	round 1, 2003	77	18
133	(South Australia) Trent Hentschel	2003–2010	round 3, 2003	71	94
134	(Northern Territory) Ronnie Burns	2003–2004	round 1, 2004	20	23
135	(South Australia) James Begley	2003–2005	round 8, 2003	25	3
136	(South Australia) Ben Rutten	2003–2014	round 16, 2003	229	9
137	(Victoria (state)) Jacob Schuback	2003–2004	round 20, 2003	7	4
138	(Western Australia) Scott Stevens	2004–2011	round 2, 2004	119	71
139	(Victoria (state)) Ben Hudson	2004–2007	round 3, 2004	55	6
140	(South Australia) Luke Jericho	2004–2008	round 4, 2004	33	31
141	(South Australia) Nathan Bock	2004–2010	round 5, 2004	113	57
142	(England) Fergus Watts	2004	round 13, 2004	5	2
143	(South Australia) Scott Thompson +	2005–2017	round 2, 2005	269	145
144	(Western Australia) Nathan van Berlo	2005–2016	round 3, 2005	205	68
145	(Victoria (state)) Chris Knights	2005–2012	round 15, 2005	96	68
146	(South Australia) Bernie Vince	2006–2013	round 1, 2006	129	80
147	(South Australia) Jason Porplyzia	2006–2014	round 5, 2006	130	181
148	(Victoria (state)) Ivan Maric	2006–2011	round 6, 2006	77	28
149	(Victoria (state)) Richard Douglas	2006–2019	round 21, 2006	246	164
150	(Western Australia) Jonathon Griffin	2007–2010	round 1, 2007	41	7
151	(South Australia) John Hinge	2007	round 6, 2007	1	0
152	(New South Wales) Bryce Campbell	2007–2008	round 17, 2007	8	1
153	(Victoria (state)) Nick Gill	2007–2009	round 17, 2007	17	21
154	(Victoria (state)) John Meesen	2007	round 20, 2007	2	0
155	(Victoria (state)) David Mackay	2008–2021	round 1, 2008	248	68
156	(South Australia) Brad Symes	2008–2012	round 1, 2008	60	6
157	(New South Wales) Kurt Tippett	2008–2012	round 1, 2008	104	188
158	(Western Australia) Jarrhan Jacky	2008	round 5, 2008	3	1
159	(South Australia) James Sellar	2008–2011	round 7, 2008	21	3
160	(Victoria (state)) Andy Otten	2008–2018	round 12, 2008	109	38
161	(Queensland) Brad Moran	2008–2011	round 16, 2008	18	8
162	(Victoria (state)) Patrick Dangerfield	2008–2015	round 20, 2008	154	163
163	(Victoria (state)) Myke Cook	2009–2011	round 1, 2009	14	2
164	(South Australia) Jared Petrenko	2009–2014	round 1, 2009	76	50
165	(New South Wales) Taylor Walker	2009–2026	round 1, 2009	319	715
166	(Victoria (state)) Shaun McKernan	2009–2014	round 14, 2009	34	21
167	(South Australia) Brodie Martin	2009–2015	round 16, 2009	38	14
168	(Victoria (state)) Rory Sloane	2009–2023	round 20, 2009	255	136

=== 2010s ===
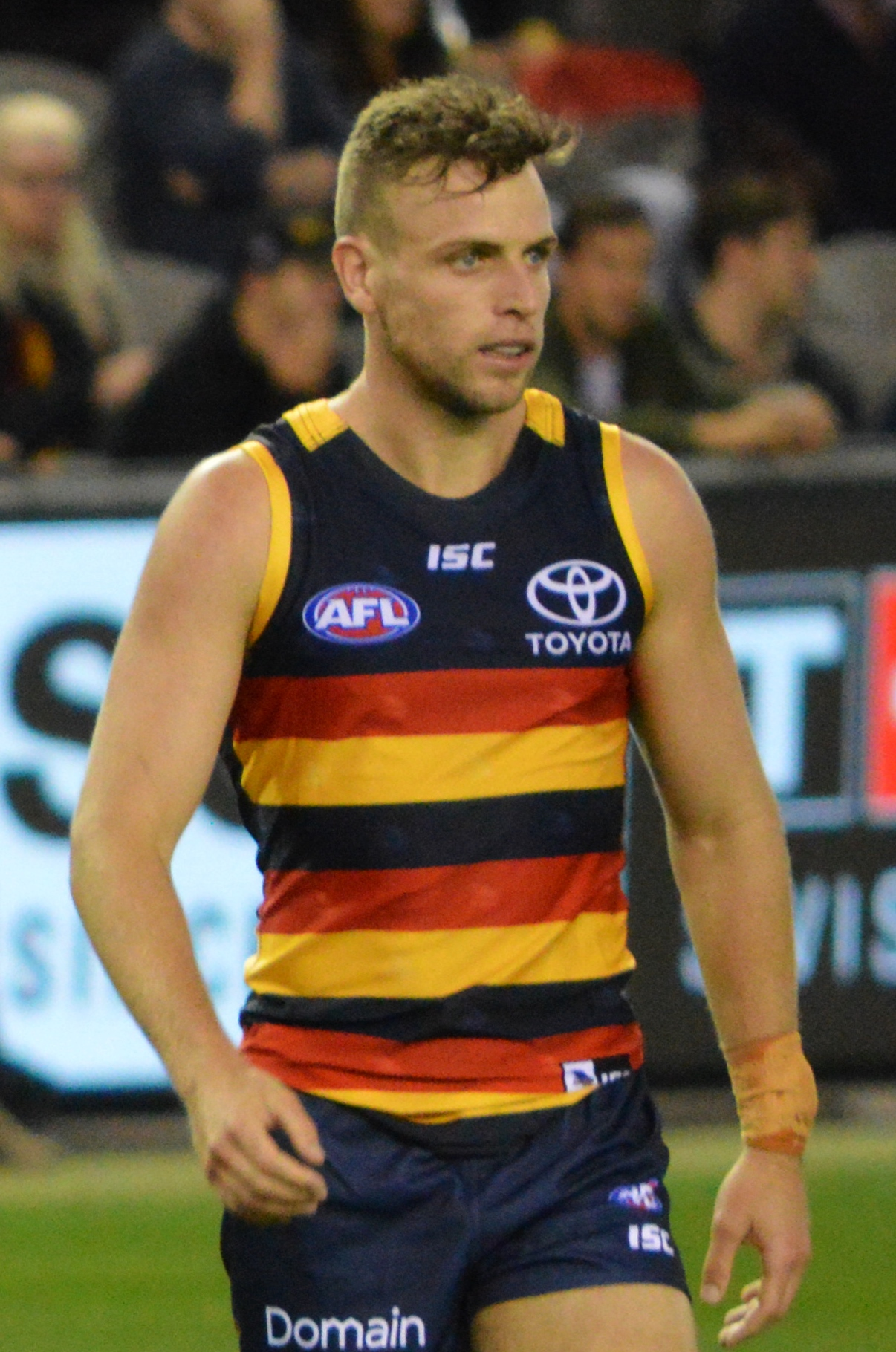
Brodie Smith played 273 games for Adelaide.

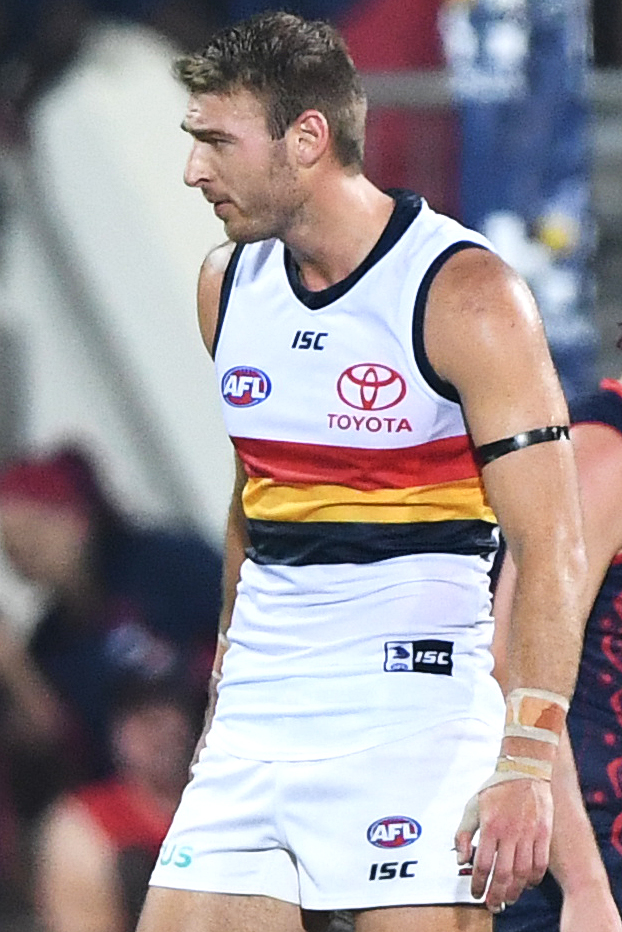
Daniel Talia was Adelaide's first recipient of the Rising Star award.

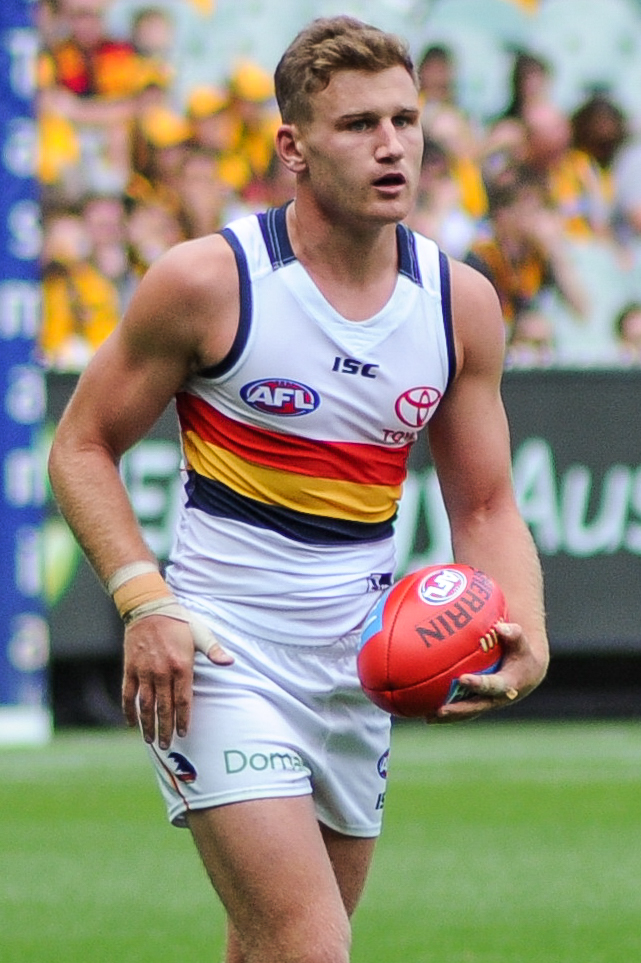
Rory Laird is a three-time Malcolm Blight Medal winner.

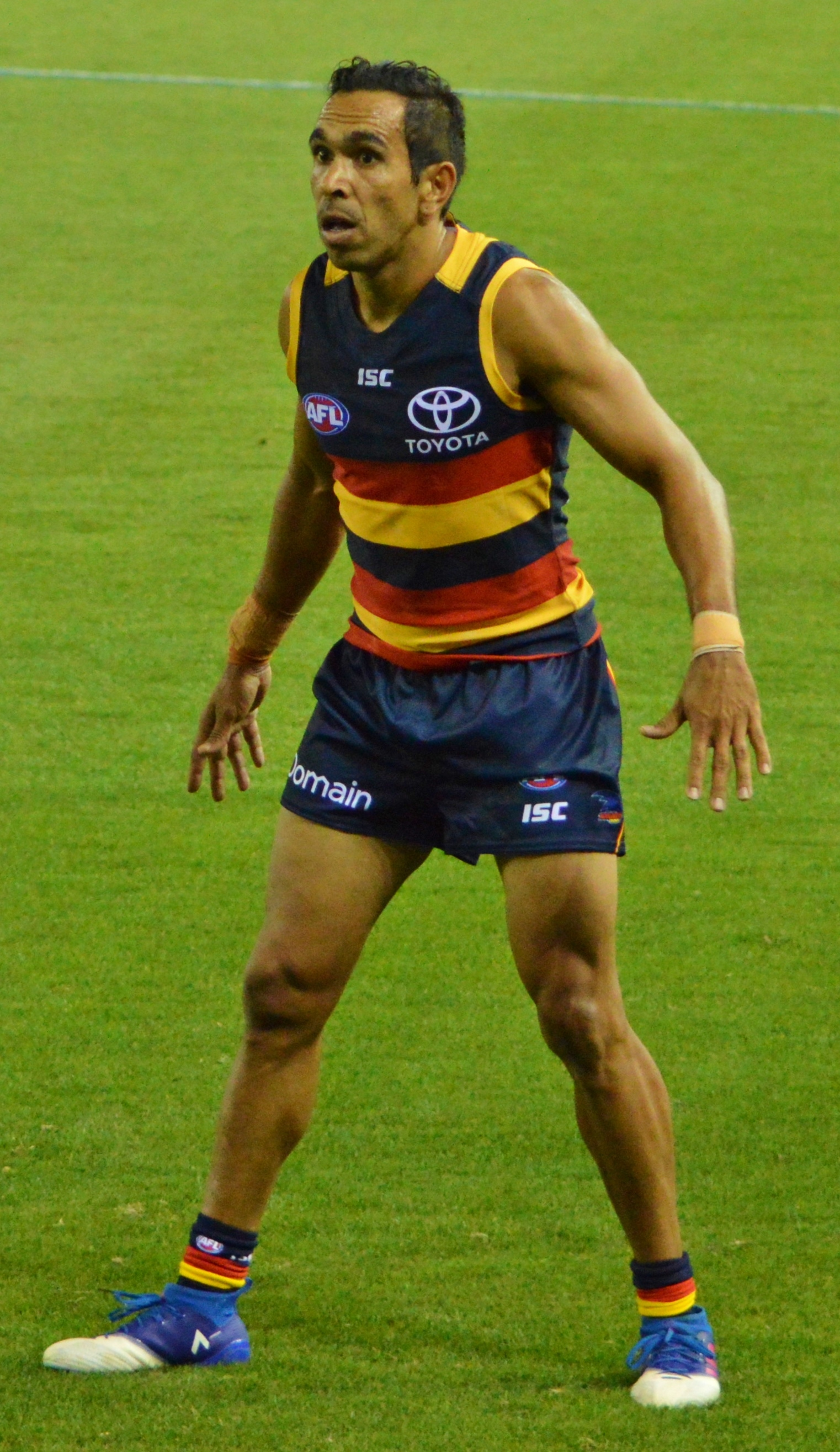
Eddie Betts was a three-time All-Australian and four-time leading goalkicker for the Crows.

Cap	Name	Seasons	Debut	Games	Goals
169	(New South Wales) Tony Armstrong	2010–2011	round 1, 2010	14	0
170	(Victoria (state)) Will Young	2010–2012	round 2, 2010	2	1
171	(South Australia) Chris Schmidt	2009–2011	round 3, 2010	18	2
172	(Australian Capital Territory) Phil Davis	2010–2011	round 4, 2010	18	1
173	(Victoria (state)) Ricky Henderson	2010–2016	round 5, 2010	90	43
174	(South Australia) Matthew Jaensch	2010–2015	round 6, 2010	74	25
175	(Victoria (state)) Jack Gunston	2010–2011	round 9, 2010	14	20
176	(South Australia) Brodie Smith	2011–2025	round 1, 2011	273	74
177	(Northern Territory) Richard Tambling	2011–2013	round 1, 2011	16	1
178	(Victoria (state)) Luke Thompson	2011–2014	round 4, 2011	20	2
179	(South Australia) Matthew Wright	2011–2015	round 4, 2011	94	63
180	(South Australia) Sam Jacobs	2011–2019	round 5, 2011	184	45
181	(Tasmania) Ian Callinan	2011–2013	round 14, 2011	32	49
182	(Victoria (state)) Daniel Talia	2011–2020	round 15, 2011	200	6
183	(New South Wales) Aidan Riley	2011–2013	round 19, 2011	12	5
184	(Victoria (state)) Tom Lynch	2012–2021	round 1, 2012	158	199
185	(Victoria (state)) Sam Kerridge	2012–2015	round 3, 2012	27	23
186	(Victoria (state)) Sam Shaw	2012–2016	round 4, 2012	24	0
187	(Victoria (state)) Jarryd Lyons	2010–2016	round 5, 2012	55	32
188	(Victoria (state)) Josh Jenkins	2012–2019	round 7, 2012	147	296
189	(South Australia) Tim McIntyre	2012–2013	round 15, 2012	1	2
190	(South Australia) Luke Brown	2012–2022	round 16, 2012	189	13
191	(South Australia) Lewis Johnston	2012–2014	round 20, 2012	8	15
192	(Victoria (state)) Brad Crouch	2013–2019	round 2, 2013	95	34
193	(South Australia) Rory Laird^	2013–	round 4, 2013	289	32
194	(South Australia) Mitch Grigg	2013–2016	round 17, 2013	20	15
195	(Victoria (state)) Kyle Hartigan	2013–2019	round 18, 2013	113	1
196	(South Australia) Eddie Betts	2014–2019	round 1, 2014	132	310
197	(Victoria (state)) James Podsiadly	2014–2015	round 1, 2014	21	26
198	(Victoria (state)) Matt Crouch	2014–2025	round 3, 2014	164	31
199	(Queensland) Charlie Cameron	2014–2017	round 9, 2014	73	87
200	(South Australia) Cam Ellis-Yolmen	2014–2019	round 12, 2014	39	15
201	(Victoria (state)) Kyle Cheney	2015–2018	round 1, 2015	44	0
202	(Victoria (state)) Jake Kelly	2015–2021	round 3, 2015	110	1
203	(Victoria (state)) Jake Lever	2015–2017	round 6, 2015	56	3
204	(South Australia) Riley Knight	2015–2020	round 15, 2015	55	37
205	(Victoria (state)) Rory Atkins	2015–2019	round 16, 2015	101	47
206	(Western Australia) Mitch McGovern	2016–2018	round 1, 2016	48	67
207	(South Australia) Wayne Milera^	2016–	round 1, 2016	143	34
208	(Victoria (state)) Paul Seedsman	2016–2021	round 1, 2016	83	49
209	(Victoria (state)) Reilly O'Brien^	2016–	round 20, 2016	148	17
210	(Northern Territory) Curtly Hampton	2017–2018	round 1, 2017	12	4
211	(South Australia) Troy Menzel	2017	round 1, 2017	4	4
212	(Victoria (state)) Jordan Gallucci	2017–2020	round 9, 2017	27	19
213	(Tasmania) Hugh Greenwood	2017–2019	round 9, 2017	51	36
214	(South Australia) Jonathon Beech	2017	round 12, 2017	3	1
215	(Victoria (state)) Alex Keath	2017–2019	round 18, 2017	30	1
216	(Victoria (state)) Tom Doedee	2018–2023	round 1, 2018	82	3
217	(South Australia) Darcy Fogarty^	2018–	round 1, 2018	142	233
218	(South Australia) Bryce Gibbs	2018–2020	round 1, 2018	37	15
219	(Victoria (state)) Lachlan Murphy	2018–2025	round 1, 2018	120	75
220	(Victoria (state)) Myles Poholke	2018–2020	round 5, 2018	16	5
221	(Victoria (state)) Sam Gibson	2018	round 9, 2018	5	2
222	(South Australia) Patrick Wilson	2018–2019	round 13, 2018	2	0
223	(New South Wales) Elliott Himmelberg	2018–2024	round 23, 2018	50	49
224	(Tasmania) Chayce Jones	2019–2026	round 1, 2019	100	23
225	(New South Wales) Ben Davis	2019–2022	round 15, 2019	11	1
226	(South Australia) Tyson Stengle	2019–2020	round 19, 2019	14	13

=== 2020s ===
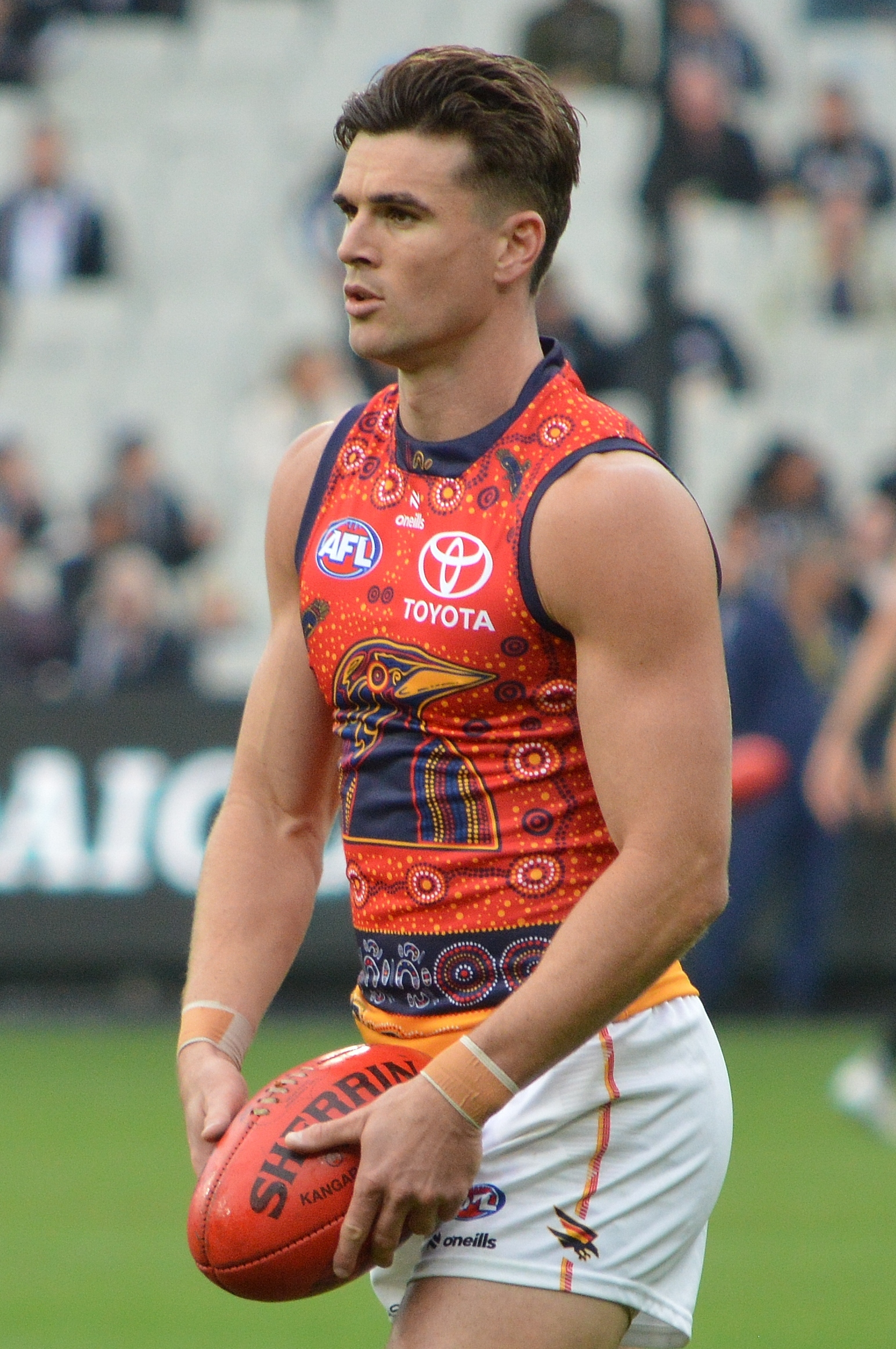
Ben Keays holds the record for the most consecutive club games played.

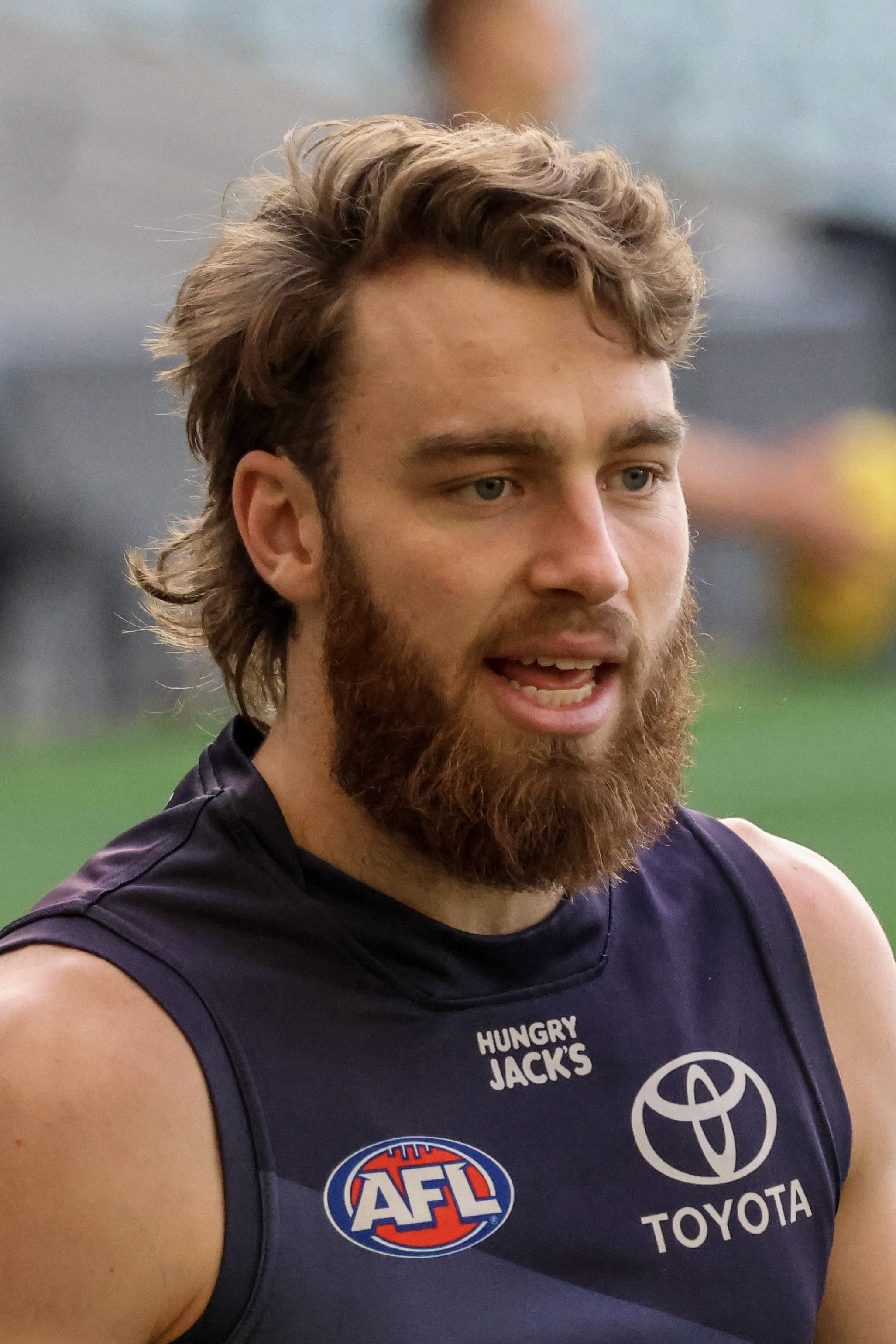
Riley Thilthorpe was Adelaide's highest-ever draft pick.

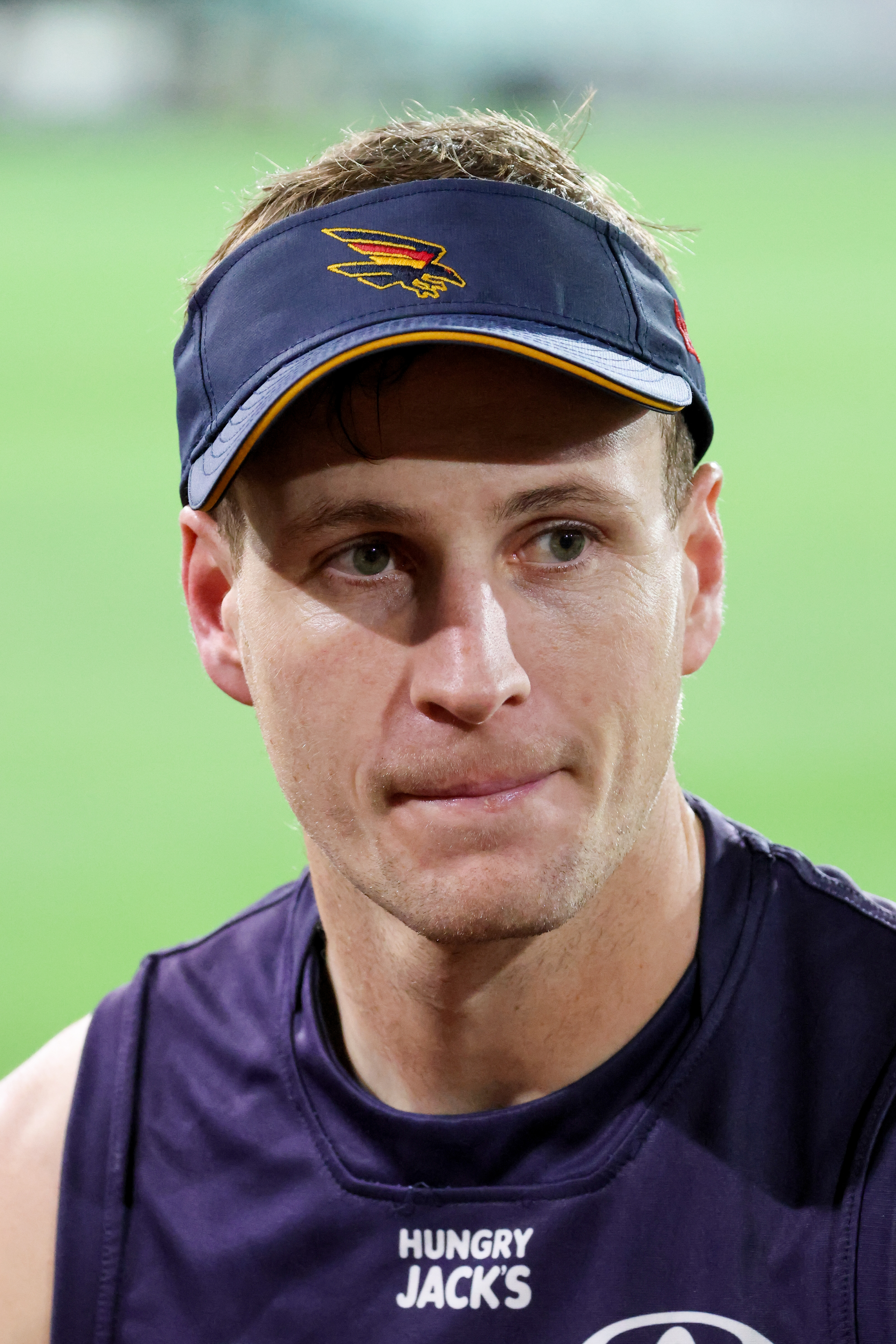
Jordan Dawson is the current club captain and a record four-time Malcolm Blight Medallist.

Cap	Name	Seasons	Debut	Games	Goals
227	(Western Australia) Billy Frampton	2020–2022	round 1, 2020	21	8
228	(Victoria (state)) Fischer McAsey	2020	round 1, 2020	10	0
229	(Victoria (state)) Ben Crocker	2020	round 2, 2020	7	4
230	(Victoria (state)) Ben Keays^	2020–	round 2, 2020	156	151
231	(Victoria (state)) Ned McHenry	2020–2024	round 2, 2020	70	32
232	(Victoria (state)) Will Hamill	2020–2024	round 3, 2020	45	1
233	(Western Australia) Shane McAdam	2020–2023	round 4, 2020	50	72
234	(South Australia) Andrew McPherson	2020–2022	round 6, 2020	28	0
235	(Victoria (state)) Kieran Strachan	2020–2025	round 9, 2020	7	1
236	(South Australia) Harry Schoenberg	2020–2025	round 10, 2020	62	22
237	(Victoria (state)) Lachlan Sholl	2020–2026	round 10, 2020	79	26
238	(Victoria (state)) Jordon Butts	2020–2026	round 13, 2020	94	1
239	(Victoria (state)) Sam Berry^	2021–	round 1, 2021	100	20
240	(South Australia) Mitch Hinge^	2021–	round 1, 2021	87	7
241	(South Australia) James Rowe	2021–2022	round 1, 2021	36	27
242	(New South Wales) Nick Murray^	2021–	round 2, 2021	78	3
243	(Australian Capital Territory) Jackson Hately	2021–2023	round 6, 2021	15	2
244	(South Australia) Riley Thilthorpe^	2021–	round 6, 2021	100	156
245	(Western Australia) Ronin O'Connor	2021	round 9, 2021	3	0
246	(England) Josh Worrell^	2021–	round 13, 2021	79	0
247	(South Australia) Luke Pedlar	2021–2026	round 16, 2021	49	48
248	(South Australia) Brayden Cook^	2021–	round 21, 2021	54	27
249	(Victoria (state)) Lachlan Gollant	2021–2024	round 23, 2021	16	13
250	(South Australia) Jordan Dawson^	2022–	round 1, 2022	114	66
251	(Victoria (state)) Josh Rachele^	2022–	round 1, 2022	95	139
252	(Victoria (state)) Jake Soligo^	2022–	round 1, 2022	107	45
253	(Victoria (state)) Patrick Parnell	2022–2024	round 12, 2022	17	0
254	(Victoria (state)) Tyler Brown	2023	round 1, 2023	1	0
255	(South Australia) Max Michalanney^	2023–	round 1, 2023	91	4
256	(South Australia) Izak Rankine^	2023–	round 1, 2023	79	121
257	(Victoria (state)) Luke Nankervis^	2023–	round 19, 2023	49	6
258	(Republic of Ireland) Mark Keane^	2023–	round 20, 2023	62	0
259	(Egypt) James Borlase^	2023–	round 21, 2023	35	1
260	(South Australia) Chris Burgess	2024–2025	round 1, 2024	8	7
261	(Western Australia) Daniel Curtin^	2024–	round 8, 2024	50	18
262	(South Australia) Billy Dowling^	2024–	round 13, 2024	13	9
263	(Victoria (state)) Zac Taylor^	2024–	round 16, 2024	48	21
264	(Victoria (state)) Hugh Bond^	2024–	round 18, 2024	19	0
265	(New South Wales) Isaac Cumming^	2025–	round 1, 2025	41	15
266	(South Australia) Sid Draper^	2025–	round 1, 2025	10	3
267	(South Australia) Alex Neal-Bullen^	2025–	round 1, 2025	48	30
268	(New South Wales) James Peatling^	2025–	round 1, 2025	44	16
269	(Western Australia) Callum Ah Chee^	2026–	round 1, 2026	9	9
270	(New South Wales) Lachlan McAndrew^	2026–	round 1, 2026	24	7
271	(New South Wales) Toby Murray^	2026–	round 1, 2026	13	9
272	(Victoria (state)) Finnbar Maley^	2026–	round 3, 2026	6	4
273	(Victoria (state)) Charlie Edwards^	2026–	round 6, 2026	2	0
274	(Victoria (state)) Hugo Hall-Kahan^	2026–	round 13, 2026	13	1
275	(Victoria (state)) Archie Ludowyke^	2026–	round 21, 2026	2	1
276	(Victoria (state)) Oscar Ryan^	2026–	round 21, 2026	2	1

== Women's players ==
Key
Order	Players are listed according to the date of their debut for the club.
Seasons	The yearspan of the player's appearances for Adelaide.
Debut	Players' first AFLW matches for Adelaide.
Games	The number of games played.
Goals	The number of goals scored.
^{^}	Player is currently on Adelaide's playing list.
‡	Inducted into the Adelaide Football Club Hall of Fame and the Australian Football Hall of Fame.
Statistics are correct to the end of the 2026 season.

=== 2010s ===
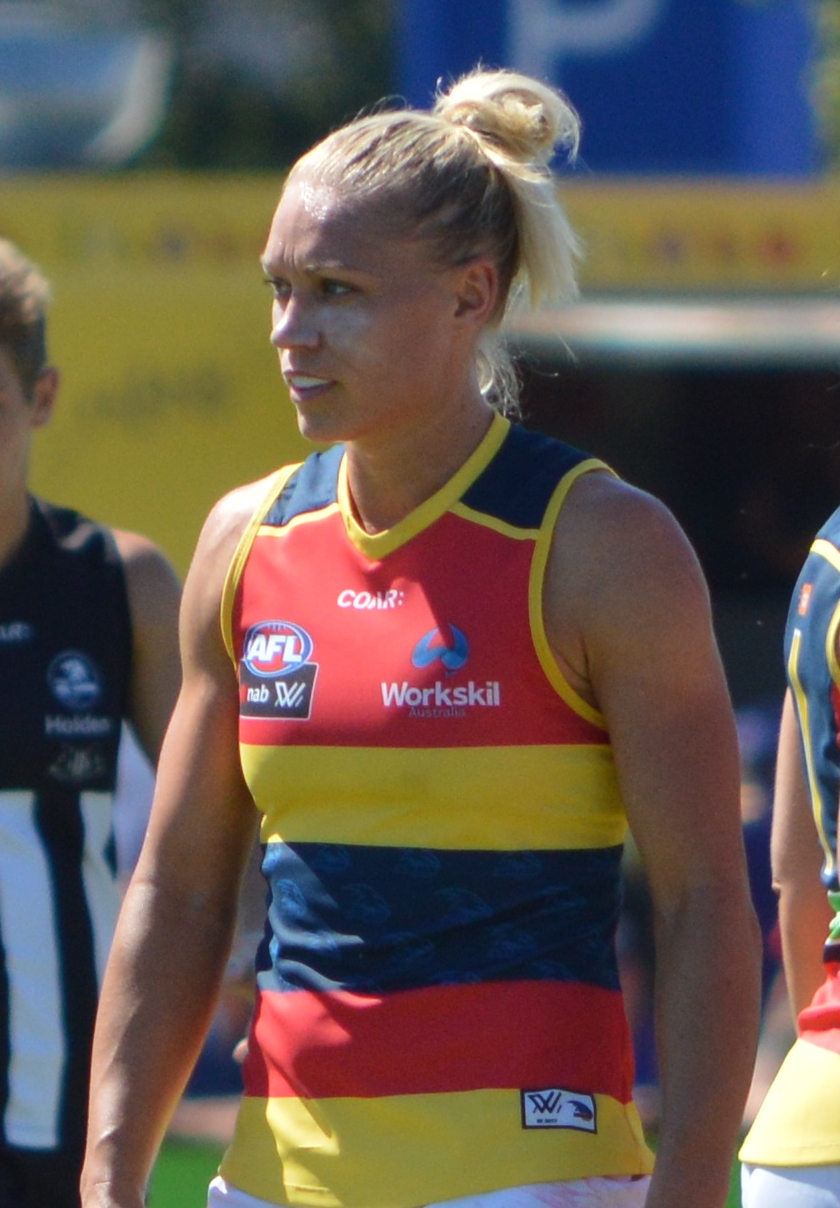
Erin Phillips is a three-time AFLW premiership player, twice as captain and twice as best on ground.

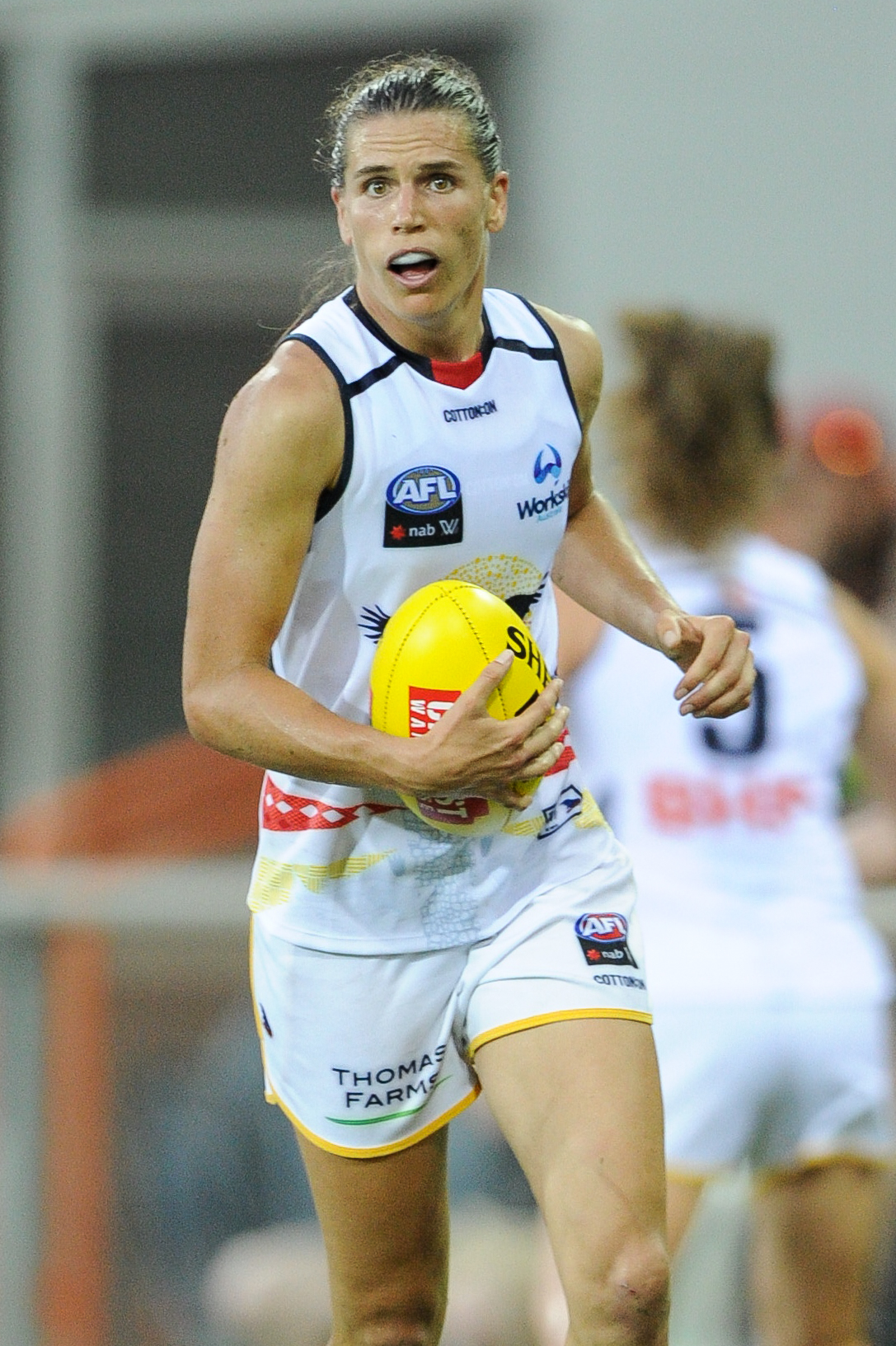
Chelsea Randall is Adelaide's longest-serving captain and three-time premiership captain.

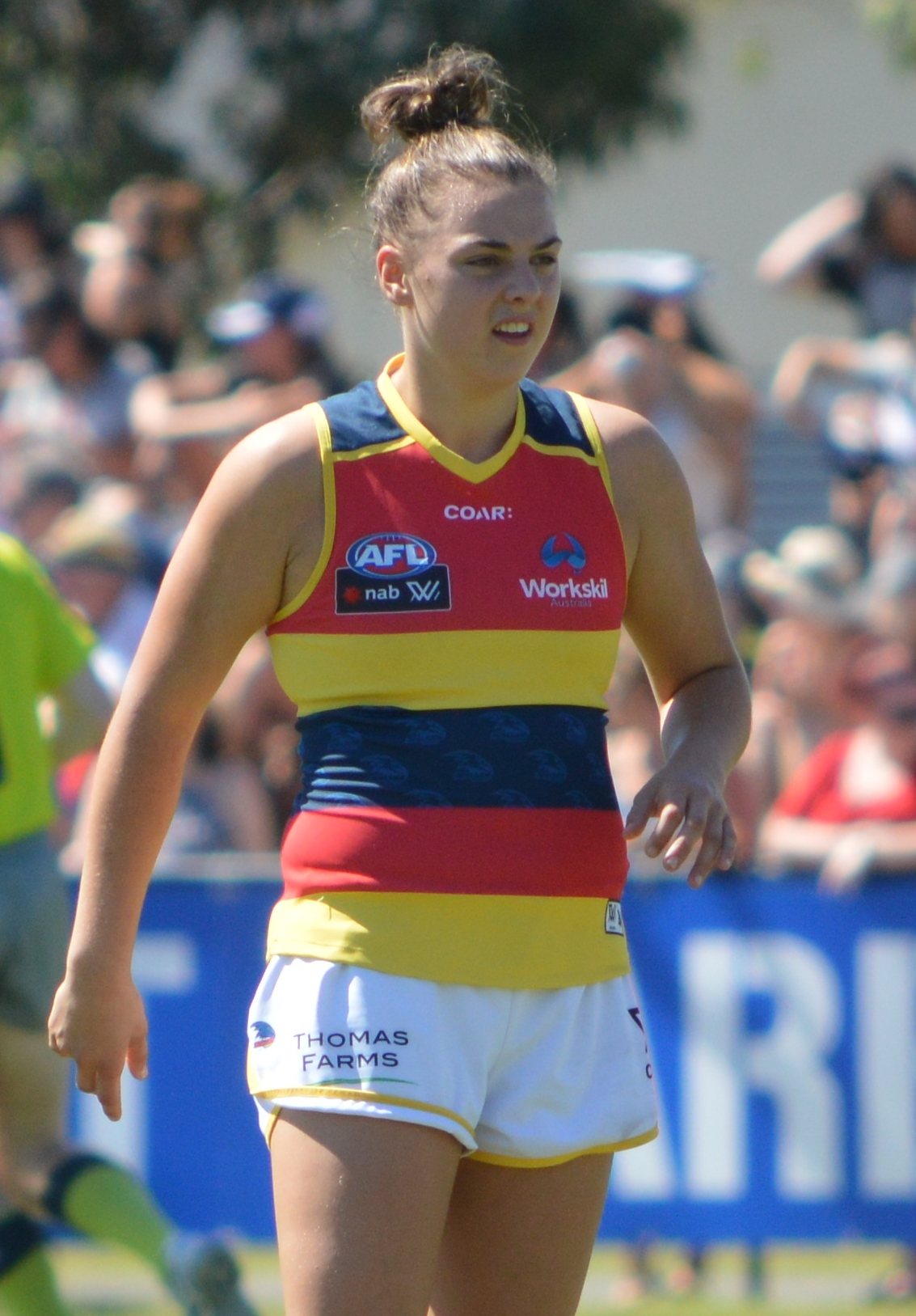
Ebony Marinoff has seven All-Australians, a league best and fairest, and she is Adelaide's games record holder.

Cap	Name	Seasons	Debut	Games	Goals
1	(South Australia) Sarah Allan^	2017–	round 1, 2017	107	0
2	(Australian Capital Territory) Heather Anderson	2017	round 1, 2017	8	0
3	(South Australia) Georgia Bevan	2017–2018	round 1, 2017	13	1
4	(South Australia) Dayna Cox	2017–2022^{(S7)}	round 1, 2017	32	0
5	(South Australia) Courtney Cramey	2017–2020	round 1, 2017	20	2
6	(Victoria (state)) Angela Foley	2017–2022^{(S6)}	round 1, 2017	40	2
7	(Western Australia) Kellie Gibson	2017	round 1, 2017	8	4
8	(South Australia) Anne Hatchard	2017–2025	round 1, 2017	102	40
9	(New South Wales) Monique Hollick	2017	round 1, 2017	3	0
10	(South Australia) Abbey Holmes	2017–2018	round 1, 2017	11	3
11	(South Australia) Ebony Marinoff^	2017–	round 1, 2017	119	20
12	(New South Wales) Rhiannon Metcalfe	2017–2021	round 1, 2017	26	1
13	(South Australia) Justine Mules	2017–2022^{(S6)}	round 1, 2017	49	4
14	(Victoria (state)) Sarah Perkins	2017–2019	round 1, 2017	17	13
15	(Victoria (state)) Erin Phillips ‡	2017–2022^{(S6)}	round 1, 2017	46	50
16	(South Australia) Talia Radan	2017–2018	round 1, 2017	10	0
17	(Western Australia) Chelsea Randall	2017–2025	round 1, 2017	80	38
18	(Northern Territory) Sally Riley	2017–2019	round 1, 2017	14	4
19	(South Australia) Jess Sedunary	2017–2019	round 1, 2017	15	5
20	(Queensland) Stevie-Lee Thompson	2017–2025	round 1, 2017	97	27
21	(Northern Territory) Tayla Thorn	2017	round 1, 2017	5	0
22	(South Australia) Deni Varnhagen	2017–2024	round 1, 2017	38	6
23	(Northern Territory) Sophie Armitstead	2017–2018	round 2, 2017	4	0
24	(South Australia) Rachael Killian	2017–2018	round 2, 2017	8	2
25	(South Australia) Jenna McCormick	2017–2019	round 2, 2017	20	9
26	(South Australia) Jessica Allan^	2018–2019; 2023–	round 1, 2018	56	5
27	(South Australia) Jasmyn Hewett	2018–2019; 2022^{(S6)}–2022^{(S7)}	round 1, 2018	10	3
28	(South Australia) Eloise Jones^	2018–	round 1, 2018	94	62
29	(South Australia) Ruth Wallace	2018	round 1, 2018	7	7
30	(South Australia) Marijana Rajčić	2018–2022^{(S7)}	round 3, 2018	50	2
31	(South Australia) Hannah Button	2019–2023	round 1, 2019	39	3
32	(Republic of Ireland) Ailish Considine	2019–2022^{(S7)}	round 1, 2019	26	9
33	(New South Wales) Jessica Foley	2019–2020	round 1, 2019	13	4
34	(Western Australia) Renee Forth	2019–2021	round 1, 2019	17	2
35	(South Australia) Sophie Li	2019–2020	round 1, 2019	14	1
36	(South Australia) Maisie Nankivell	2019	round 1, 2019	2	0
37	(South Australia) Chloe Scheer	2019–2021	round 1, 2019	17	13
38	(Northern Territory) Danielle Ponter^	2019–	round 2, 2019	86	91
39	(South Australia) Nikki Gore	2019–2022^{(S6)}	round 6, 2019	21	2

=== 2020s ===
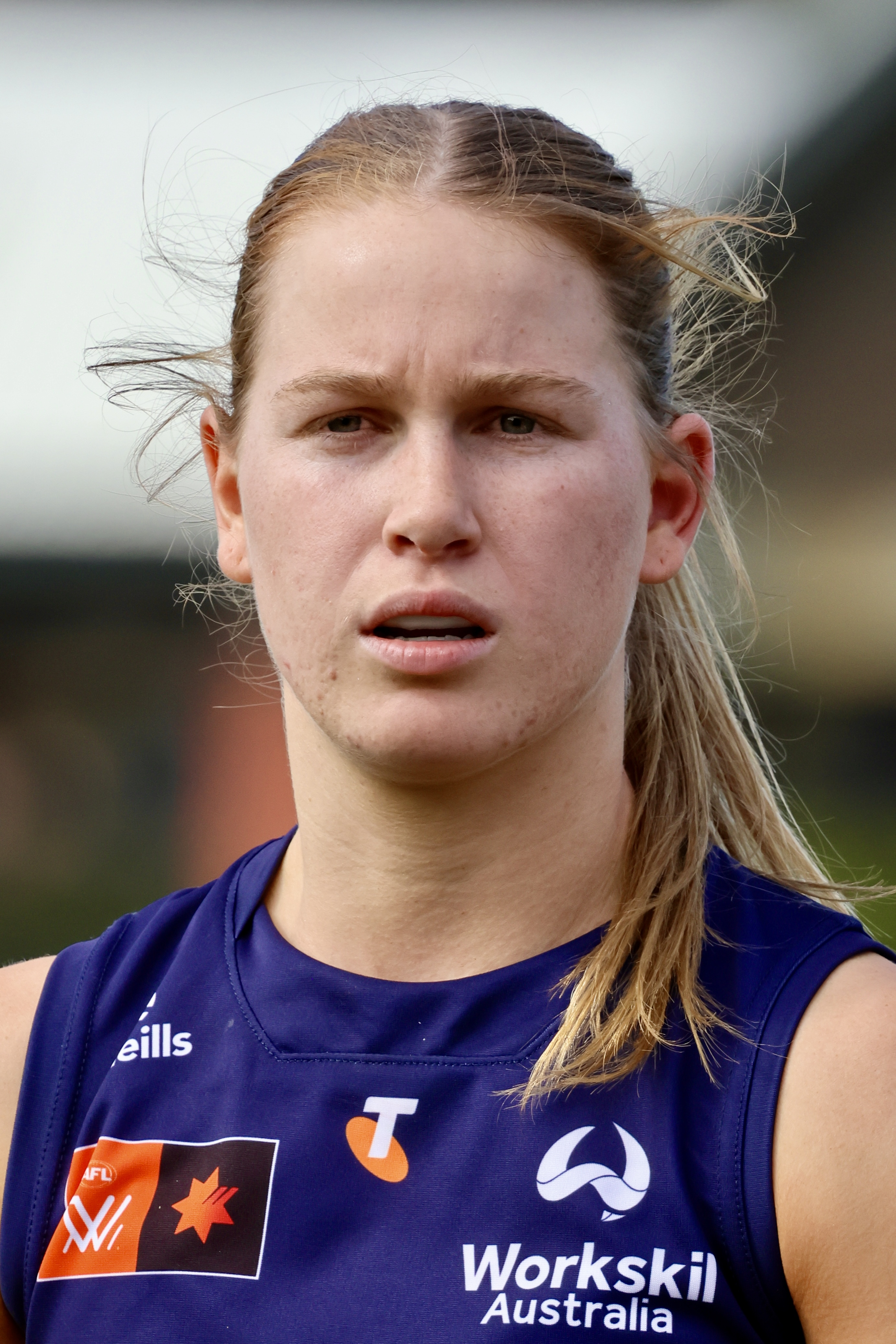
Teah Charlton is a premiership player.

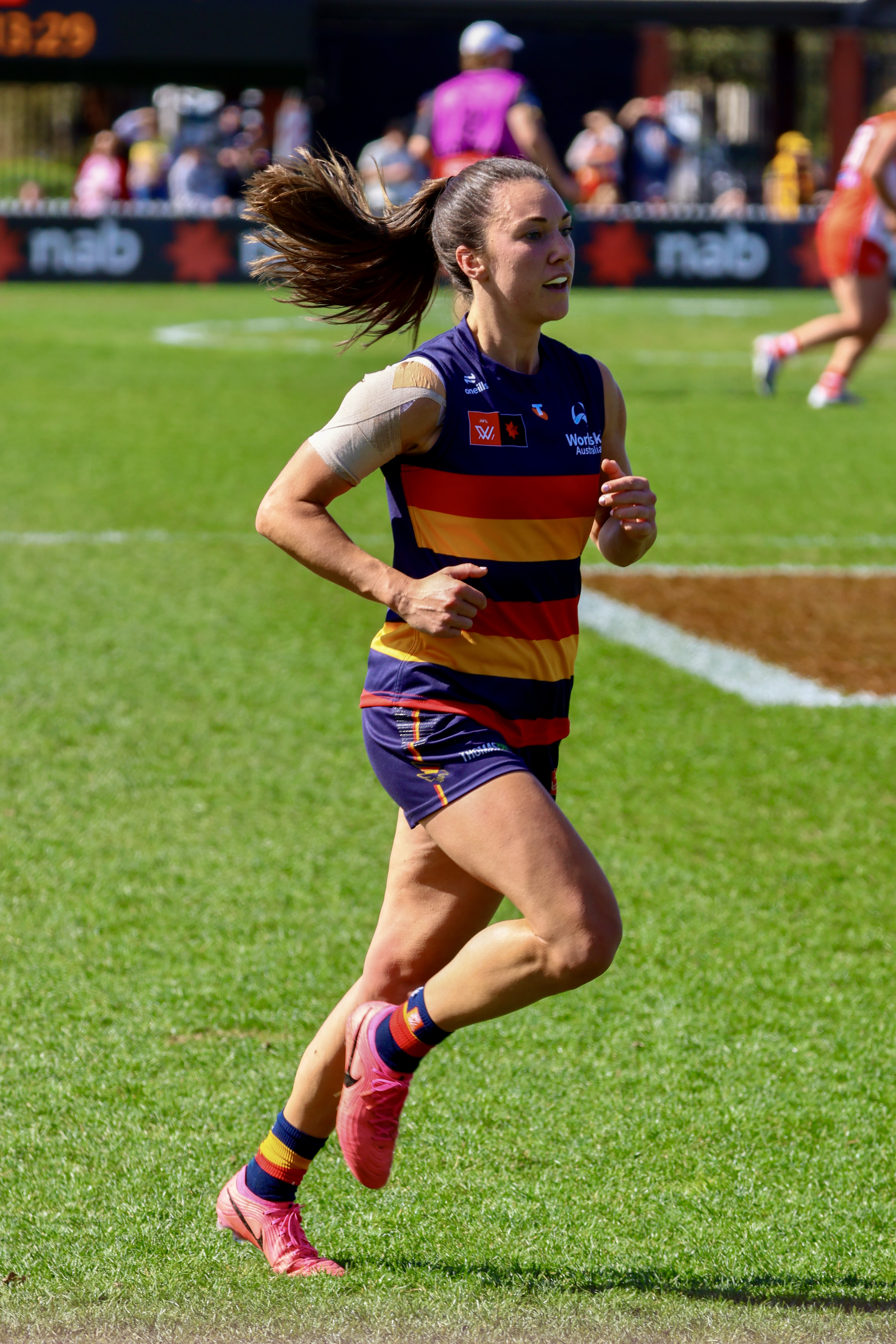
Niamh Kelly is an All-Australian.

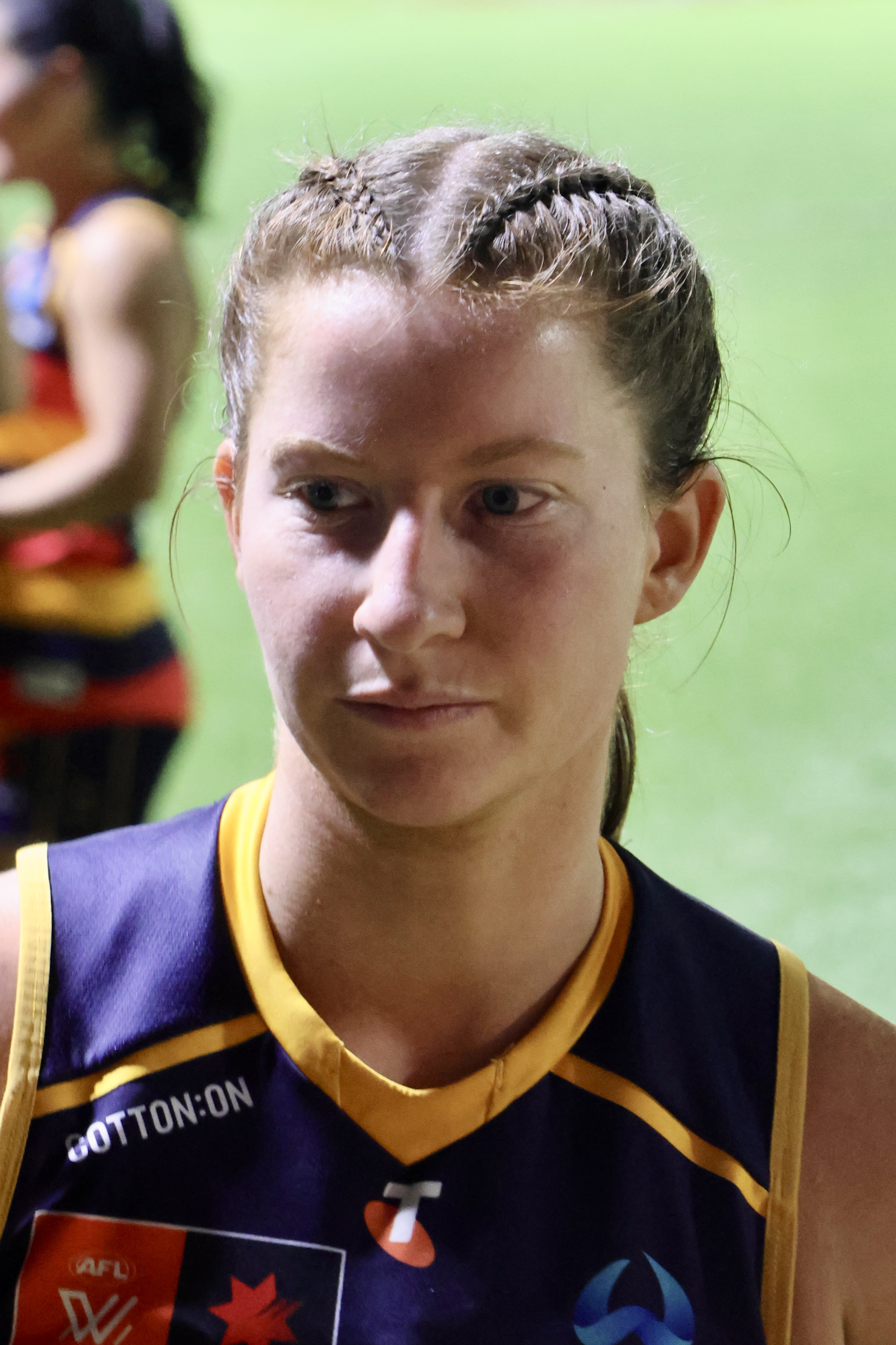
Sarah Goodwin is one of the competition's premier young midfielders.

Cap	Name	Seasons	Debut	Games	Goals
40	(Australian Capital Territory) Najwa Allen	2020–2024	round 1, 2020	45	0
41	(South Australia) Chelsea Biddell^	2020–	round 1, 2020	87	5
42	(South Australia) Nicole Campbell	2020	round 1, 2020	5	0
43	(South Australia) Courtney Gum	2020	round 1, 2020	6	3
44	(South Australia) Rachelle Martin	2020–2025	round 1, 2020	61	17
45	(South Australia) Madison Newman^	2020–	round 1, 2020	77	16
46	(South Australia) Jaimi Tabb	2020	round 1, 2020	3	0
47	(South Australia) Caitlin Gould^	2020–	round 2, 2020	82	74
48	(South Australia) Montana McKinnon	2020–2023	round 5, 2020	31	1
49	(South Australia) Teah Charlton^	2021–	round 1, 2021	83	20
50	(South Australia) Lisa Whiteley	2021–2023	round 1, 2021	21	6
51	(South Australia) Ashleigh Woodland	2021–2022^{(S7)}	round 1, 2021	36	44
52	(South Australia) Hannah Munyard^	2021–	round 4, 2021	55	9
53	(New South Wales) Jasmine Simmons	2022^{(S6)}–2022^{(S7)}	round 1, 2022^{(S6)}	8	0
54	(South Australia) Abbie Ballard	2022^{(S6)}–2025	round 3, 2022^{(S6)}	28	8
55	(South Australia) Brooke Tonon^	2022^{(S6)}–	round 7, 2022^{(S6)}	48	2
56	(Western Australia) McKenzie Dowrick	2022^{(S6)}–2023	round 10, 2022^{(S6)}	4	4
57	(South Australia) Zoe Prowse	2022^{(S6)}–2025	round 10, 2022^{(S6)}	47	4
58	(Republic of Ireland) Niamh Kelly^	2022^{(S7)}–	round 1, 2022^{(S7)}	58	19
59	(South Australia) Amber Ward	2022^{(S7)}–2023	round 2, 2022^{(S7)}	4	0
60	(South Australia) Jessica Waterhouse	2022^{(S7)}–2024	round 5, 2022^{(S7)}	15	5
61	(South Australia) Keeley Kustermann^	2022^{(S7)}–	round 7, 2022^{(S7)}	39	6
62	(South Australia) Kiera Mueller	2022^{(S7)}–2026	round 9, 2022^{(S7)}	37	0
63	(Republic of Ireland) Yvonne Bonner	2023	round 1, 2023	10	6
64	(South Australia) Sarah Goodwin^	2023–	round 1, 2023	53	3
65	(South Australia) Taylah Levy	2023–2024	round 8, 2023	16	5
66	(Victoria (state)) Brooke Smith	2023–2026	round 10, 2023	6	0
67	(South Australia) Brooke Boileau	2024–2025	round 1, 2024	18	3
68	(Republic of Ireland) Amy Boyle-Carr^	2024–	round 4, 2024	26	2
69	(Queensland) Lily Tarlinton^	2024–	round 7, 2024	11	2
70	(Republic of Ireland) Kayleigh Cronin^	2025–	round 1, 2025	16	0
71	(South Australia) Hannah Ewings	2025–2026	round 1, 2025	3	0
72	(Republic of Ireland) Grace Kelly^	2025–	round 1, 2025	23	15
73	(South Australia) India Rasheed^	2025–	round 1, 2025	24	9
74	(South Australia) Christina Leuzzi^	2025–	round 9, 2025	6	5
75	(Victoria (state)) Chloe Bown^	2026–	round 1, 2026	12	5
76	(Victoria (state)) Grace Egan^	2026–	round 1, 2026	12	6
77	(Victoria (state)) Olivia Gorman^	2026–	round 1, 2026	8	0
78	(Western Australia) Juliet Kelly^	2026–	round 1, 2026	5	0
79	(Victoria (state)) Jemmika Douglas^	2026–	round 2, 2026	11	1
80	(South Australia) Lucy Waye^	2026–	round 4, 2026	4	1
81	(South Australia) Alice Tentye^	2026–	round 8, 2026	5	0
82	(Western Australia) Ava Stewart^	2026–	round 9, 2026	4	0

== Other players ==
=== Listed players yet to play for Adelaide ===
AFL
Player	Date of birth	Acquired	Recruited from	Listed	
Player	Date of birth	Acquired	Recruited from	Rookie	Senior
(South Australia) Indy Cotton	8 May 2007	Category B rookie selection	BA Centre of Excellence (NBL1 East)	2026–	—N/a
(South Australia) Mitchell Marsh	15 February 2007	No. 22, 2025 national draft	West Adelaide	—N/a	2026–
(Victoria (state)) Toby Krasna	28 February 2008	No. 14, 2026 national draft	Northern Knights	—N/a	2027–
(Victoria (state)) Xavier Ladbrook	16 October 2008	No. 34, 2026 national draft	Gippsland Power	—N/a	2027–
(South Australia) Sam Tassone	12 February 2008	No. 44, 2026 national draft	North Adelaide	—N/a	2027–

AFL Women's
Player	Date of birth	Acquired	Recruited from	Listed	
Player	Date of birth	Acquired	Recruited from	Rookie	Senior
(Western Australia) Alicia Blizard	15 November 2007	No. 39, 2025 national draft	East Fremantle	—N/a	2026–

=== Formerly listed players who never played a senior game for Adelaide ===
Source · Sorted chronologically

AFL
Player	Date of birth	Acquired	Recruited from	Listed	
Player	Date of birth	Acquired	Recruited from	Rookie	Senior
(South Australia) Trevor Clisby	8 March 1961	Inaugural squad	North Adelaide	—N/a	1991
(South Australia) Darren Bartsch	28 April 1969	Inaugural squad	West Adelaide	—N/a	1991
(South Australia) Grant Tanner	24 July 1970	Inaugural squad	Norwood	—N/a	1991–1992
(South Australia) Damien McCarthy	14 June 1971	Inaugural squad	Woodville	—N/a	1991
(South Australia) Jarrod Hocking	7 March 1973	Inaugural squad	Glenelg	—N/a	1991–1993
(South Australia) Damien Mellow	13 September 1973	Inaugural squad	Norwood	—N/a	1991
(South Australia) Michael DiBiase	16 March 1972	1992 draft concession	Woodville-West Torrens	—N/a	1992
(South Australia) Seb Packer	18 March 1973	1992 draft concession	Sturt	—N/a	1992–1993
(South Australia) Jim West	12 April 1966	No. 6, 1992 mid-season draft	Sydney	—N/a	1992
(Victoria (state)) Andrew Geddes	2 November 1970	No. 21, 1992 mid-season draft	Strathmerton	—N/a	1992–1993
(South Australia) Alan Schwartz	2 November 1970	No. 32, 1992 mid-season draft	Essendon	—N/a	1992–1993
(South Australia) Brooke Fogden	26 February 1973	No. 41, 1992 national draft	West Adelaide	—N/a	1993
(South Australia) Sam Smart	12 February 1975	No. 86, 1992 national draft	Norwood	—N/a	1993–1994
(South Australia) Michael Godden	2 May 1975	No. 116, 1992 national draft	West Adelaide	—N/a	1993
(South Australia) Darryl Wakelin	11 August 1974	No. 11, 1993 pre-season draft	Port Adelaide (SANFL)	—N/a	1993–1994
(South Australia) Simon Pedler	7 May 1974	No. 55, 1993 pre-season draft	Port Adelaide (SANFL)	—N/a	1993–1995
(Queensland) Tim Perkins	2 August 1969	No. 8, 1993 mid-season draft	North Adelaide	—N/a	1993
(South Australia) Eugene Warrior	2 August 1976	No. 44, 1993 national draft	Port Adelaide (SANFL)	—N/a	1994
(South Australia) Toby Kennett	19 June 1977	No. 27, 1994 national draft	Sturt	—N/a	1995
(Victoria (state)) Allen Nash	1 January 1977	No. 31, 1994 national draft	Western Jets	—N/a	1995
(South Australia) Brett Higgins	3 September 1977	No. 50, 1994 national draft	Port Adelaide (SANFL)	—N/a	1995
(South Australia) Adam Ugrinic	18 June 1973	No. 53, 1995 national draft	Woodville-West Torrens	—N/a	1996–1997
(Western Australia) Brendan Logan	17 December 1975	No. 21, 1996 pre-season draft	West Perth	—N/a	1996
(South Australia) Nick Laidlaw	27 February 1978	Trade with Port Adelaide	Port Adelaide	—N/a	1997–1998
(South Australia) Greg Dempsey	19 February 1974	No. 76, 1996 national draft	West Adelaide	—N/a	1997–1998
(Victoria (state)) Ben Parker	5 June 1978	No. 86, 1996 national draft	Murray Bushrangers	—N/a	1997
(South Australia) Steven Coghill	1 February 1975	No. 21, 1997 rookie draft	West Adelaide	1997	—N/a
(South Australia) Tim Davis	31 August 1977	No. 33, 1998 rookie draft	North Adelaide	1998	—N/a
(Queensland) Steven Hall	3 July 1975	No. 64, 1998 rookie draft	Woodville-West Torrens	1998	—N/a
(Western Australia) Clint Kirey	11 July 1978	No. 63, 1998 national draft	East Fremantle	—N/a	1999
(New South Wales) Jarrod Twitt	2 July 1979	No. 53, 1999 rookie draft	Sturt	1999	—N/a
(South Australia) Scott Mathews	4 November 1978	No. 62, 1999 rookie draft	Port Adelaide	1999	—N/a
(South Australia) Balraj Singh	28 May 1981	No. 79, 1999 national draft	West Adelaide	—N/a	2000
(South Australia) Josh Coulter	23 April 1981	No. 20, 2000 rookie draft	Central District	2000	—N/a
(South Australia) Chris Robertson	9 January 1981	No. 36, 2000 rookie draft	North Adelaide	2000	—N/a
(South Australia) Jonathan Yerbury	6 January 1977	No. 50, 2000 rookie draft	Norwood	2000	—N/a
(Victoria (state)) Laurence Angwin	7 October 1992	No. 7, 2000 national draft	Dandenong Stingrays	—N/a	2001
(Victoria (state)) Michael Handby	27 April 1983	No. 38, 2000 national draft	Dandenong Stingrays	—N/a	2001–2002
(South Australia) Matthew Smith	29 March 1983	No. 48, 2000 national draft	Oakleigh Chargers	2004	2001–2003, 2005
(South Australia) Kane McLean	24 March 1982	No. 6, 2001 rookie draft	Norwood	2001	—N/a
(Victoria (state)) Ben Finnin	9 March 1984	No. 44, 2001 national draft	Northern Knights	—N/a	2002
(South Australia) Paul Thomas	6 May 1982	No. 9, 2002 rookie draft	Central District	2002	—N/a
(Western Australia) Aidan Parker	25 January 1983	No. 45, 2003 rookie draft	Subiaco	2003–2004	—N/a
(South Australia) Michael Bratton	15 March 1984	No. 58, 2003 rookie draft	Norwood	2003	—N/a
(South Australia) Joshua Krueger	27 October 1983	No. 31, 2003 national draft	Glenelg	—N/a	2004–2005
(Tasmania) Tim Hazell	13 July 1981	No. 12, 2004 rookie draft	Hawthorn	2004	—N/a
(Tasmania) Rowan Andrews	11 May 1985	No. 28, 2004 rookie draft	Tassie Mariners	2004–2005	—N/a
(South Australia) Brad Dabrowski	26 March 1981	No. 43, 2004 rookie draft	West Adelaide	2004	—N/a
(South Australia) Chad Gibson	12 January 1987	No. 28, 2004 national draft	Norwood	—N/a	2005–2006
(Western Australia) Ryan Nye	21 June 1986	No. 5, 2005 rookie draft	Peel Thunder	2005	—N/a
(South Australia) Darren Pfeiffer	28 September 1987	No. 17, 2005 national draft	Norwood	—N/a	2006–2007
(South Australia) Alan Obst	19 May 1987	No. 48, 2005 national draft	Central District	—N/a	2006
(South Australia) Brad Sugars	13 March 1987	No. 16, 2006 rookie draft	Glenelg	2006	—N/a
(South Australia) Tom Redden	16 August 1987	No. 29, 2006 rookie draft	Glenelg	2006	—N/a
(Victoria (state)) Adrian Bonaddio	26 May 1986	No. 42, 2006 rookie draft	Oakleigh Chargers	2006	—N/a
(South Australia) Sam Elliott	22 July 1987	No. 53, 2006 rookie draft	South Adelaide	2006	—N/a
(South Australia) Andrew McIntyre	10 March 1987	No. 14, 2007 rookie draft	North Adelaide	2007	—N/a
(South Australia) James Turner	8 September 1988	No. 29, 2007 rookie draft	South Adelaide	2007	—N/a
(Victoria (state)) Rhys Archard	15 April 1983	No. 43, 2007 rookie draft	South Adelaide	2007	—N/a
(South Australia) Greg Gallman	6 December 1988	No. 54, 2007 rookie draft	North Adelaide	2007	2008–2009
(Victoria (state)) Aaron Kite	13 January 1990	No. 71, 2007 national draft	Calder Cannons	—N/a	2008–2009
(South Australia) James Moss	19 November 1989	No. 9, 2008 rookie draft	Central District	2008–2009	—N/a
(South Australia) Ed Curnow	7 November 1989	No. 40, 2008 rookie draft	Geelong Falcons	2008	—N/a
(Western Australia) Tom Lee	2 January 1991	No. 60, 2008 national draft	Claremont	—N/a	2009
(Republic of Ireland) Brian Donnelly	21 July 1988	No. 55, 2009 rookie draft	Louth GAA	2009–2010	—N/a
(South Australia) James Craig	18 April 1991	No. 61, 2009 national draft	North Adelaide	2012	2010–2011
(South Australia) Tim Milera	3 September 1992	No. 15, 2011 rookie draft	Port Adelaide (SANFL)	2011	—N/a
(South Australia) Jake von Bertouch	4 May 1992	No. 32, 2011 rookie draft	Woodville-West Torrens	2011	—N/a
(South Australia) Lachlan Roach	25 April 1992	No. 49, 2011 rookie draft	North Adelaide	2011	—N/a
(New South Wales) Sam Martyn	7 April 1992	No. 84, 2011 rookie draft	NSW/ACT Rams	2011–2012	—N/a
(South Australia) Nick Joyce	28 September 1993	No. 46, 2011 national draft	Woodville-West Torrens	—N/a	2012–2013
(Victoria (state)) Dylan Orval	29 July 1993	No. 23, 2012 rookie draft	Oakleigh Chargers	2012–2013	—N/a
(New South Wales) Ben Dowdell	29 September 1988	No. 89, 2012 rookie draft	Santa Clara (US college basketball)	2012–2013	—N/a
(Tasmania) Angus Graham	16 April 1987	Trade with Richmond	Richmond	—N/a	2013–2014
(Tasmania) Sam Siggins	20 March 1994	No. 62, 2012 national draft	Lauderdale	—N/a	2013–2015
(Tasmania) Jack Osborn	29 April 1990	No. 36, 2013 rookie draft	Adams State (US college basketball)	2013–2015	—N/a
(South Australia) Tim Klaosen	22 November 1989	No. 42, 2013 rookie draft	Sturt Sabres (NBL1 Central)	2013	—N/a
(South Australia) James Battersby	7 November 1995	No. 24, 2014 rookie draft	Sturt	2014	—N/a
(South Australia) Alex Spina	27 June 1995	No. 52, 2014 rookie draft	North Adelaide	2014	—N/a
(Victoria (state)) Luke Lowden	22 February 1991	Trade with Hawthorn	Hawthorn	—N/a	2015–2016
(South Australia) Harrison Wigg	16 October 1996	No. 35, 2014 national draft	North Adelaide	—N/a	2015–2017
(Victoria (state)) Harry Dear	18 August 1996	No. 58, 2014 national draft	Sandringham Dragons	—N/a	2015–2018
(South Australia) Keenan Ramsey	23 August 1996	No. 27, 2015 rookie draft	Port Adelaide (SANFL)	2015–2016	—N/a
(South Australia) Anthony Wilson	2 August 1992	No. 44, 2015 rookie draft	Norwood	2015	—N/a
(South Australia) Dean Gore	26 June 1996	Trade with Geelong	Geelong	—N/a	2016–2017
(New South Wales) Paul Hunter	9 February 1993	No. 13, 2016 rookie draft	Redland	2016–2019	—N/a
(Victoria (state)) Matthew Signorello	30 October 1998	No. 62, 2016 national draft	Northern Knights	—N/a	2017–2018
(South Australia) Ben Jarman	5 May 1998	No. 45, 2017 rookie draft	North Adelaide	2017–2018	—N/a
(Victoria (state)) Jackson Edwards	11 October 1999	No. 41, 2018 rookie draft	Glenelg	2018	—N/a
(Victoria (state)) Ayce Taylor	26 September 2000	2020 pre-season SSP	North Melbourne (VFL)	2020	—N/a
(South Australia) Tariek Newchurch	21 July 2002	Category B rookie selection	North Adelaide	2021–2023	—N/a
(South Australia) Brett Turner	11 January 1997	No. 4, 2022 mid-season rookie draft	Glenelg	2022	—N/a
(Republic of Ireland) Karl Gallagher	21 February 2002	Category B rookie selection	Monaghan GAA	2024–2025	—N/a
(South Australia) Tyler Welsh	15 August 2006	No. 59 (F/S), 2024 national draft	Adelaide (SANFL), Woodville-West Torrens	2026	2025

AFL Women's
Player	Date of birth	Acquired	Recruited from	Listed	
Player	Date of birth	Acquired	Recruited from	Rookie	Senior
(Northern Territory) Jasmine Anderson	14 February 1991	2016 rookie signing	North Adelaide	2017	—N/a
(Northern Territory) Lauren O'Shea	7 July 1984	2016 free agency signing	Waratah	—N/a	2017
(Northern Territory) Calista Boyd	4 June 1999	No. 8, 2017 rookie draft	Wanderers	2018	—N/a
(South Australia) Brianna Walling	26 September 1999	No. 15, 2017 rookie draft	Morphettville Park	2018	—N/a
(South Australia) Becchara Palmer	18 June 1988	2017 rookie signing	Beach volleyball	2018	—N/a
(South Australia) Katelyn Rosenzweig	29 June 2000	No. 41, 2018 draft	North Adelaide	—N/a	2019
(South Australia) Czenya Cavouras	unknown	2020 train-on signing	South Adelaide	2020	—N/a
(Victoria (state)) Tamara Henry	5 July 2005	No. 28, 2023 national draft	Western Jets	—N/a	2024
(South Australia) Georgia McKee	24 April 2006	No. 44, 2024 national draft	Central District	—N/a	2025–2026

== See also ==
- List of Adelaide Football Club captains
- List of Adelaide Football Club coaches
