= 1998 AFL draft =

Draft for the Australian Football League

The 1998 AFL draft consisted of a pre-season draft, a national draft, a trade period and a rookie elevation. The AFL draft is the annual draft of talented players by Australian rules football teams that participate in the main competition of that sport, the Australian Football League.

In 1998 there were 91 picks to be drafted between 16 teams in the national draft. The Brisbane Lions received the first pick in the national draft after finishing on the bottom of the ladder during the 1998 AFL season.

== 1998 national draft ==
The national draft was held on 1 November 1998.

Round	Pick	Player	Recruited from	Club
1	1	Des Headland	Subiaco Football Club	Brisbane Lions
1	2	Justin Longmuir	West Perth Football Club	Fremantle
1	3	Nic Fosdike	Norwood Football Club	Sydney Swans
1	4	Ryan Fitzgerald	South Adelaide Football Club	Sydney Swans
1	5	Michael Stevens	Murray Bushrangers	Port Adelaide
1	6	Murray Vance	Murray Bushrangers	Carlton
1	7	Josh Carr	East Fremantle Football Club	Port Adelaide
1	8	Jude Bolton	Calder Cannons	Sydney Swans
1	9	Mark McVeigh	NSW/ACT Rams	Essendon
1	10	Brandon Hill	Peel Thunder Football Club	West Coast Eagles
1	11	Lenny Hayes	NSW/ACT Rams	St Kilda
1	12	Adam Ramanauskas	Dandenong Stingrays	Essendon
1	13	Chris Lamb	Murray Bushrangers	Melbourne
1	14	Luke Penny	Oakleigh Chargers	Western Bulldogs
1	15	Brady Rawlings	Tassie Mariners	North Melbourne
1	16	Brett Burton	Woodville-West Torrens Eagles	Adelaide
2	17	Peter Street	Tassie Mariners	Geelong
2	18	Daniel Schell	Central District Football Club	Fremantle
2	19	Nick Davis	NSW/ACT Rams	Collingwood
2	20	Michael Collica	East Fremantle Football Club	Hawthorn
2	21	David Clarke	Geelong Falcons	Geelong
2	22	James Begley	Sturt Football Club	St Kilda
2	23	Chris Ladhams	North Adelaide Football Club	Essendon
2	24	David Wojcinski	Gippsland Power	Geelong
2	25	Aaron Henneman	Murray Bushrangers	Essendon
2	26	Michael O'Brien	Bendigo Pioneers	West Coast Eagles
2	27	Steven Baker	Geelong Falcons	St Kilda
2	28	Heath James	Port Adelaide Magpies	Sydney Swans
2	29	Tyson Stenglein	Subiaco Football Club	Adelaide
2	30	Nicky Winmar	St Kilda	Western Bulldogs
2	31	Gary Dhurrkay	Fremantle	North Melbourne
2	32	David Gallagher	Prahran Dragons	Adelaide
3	33	Craig Bolton	NSW/ACT Rams	Brisbane Lions
3	34	Bryan Beinke	Port Adelaide Magpies	Adelaide
3	35	Brad Oborne	Preston Knights	Collingwood
3	36	Danny Jacobs	Prahran Dragons	Essendon
3	37	Adam Morgan	Oakleigh Chargers	Port Adelaide
3	38	Brendan Fevola	Dandenong Stingrays	Carlton
3	39	Toby Thurstans	Dandenong Stingrays	Port Adelaide
3	40	James White	Oakleigh Chargers	Richmond
3	41	Craig Jacotine	Dandenong Stingrays	Collingwood
3	42	Forfeit	-	West Coast Eagles
3	43	Damien Ryan	Richmond	St Kilda
3	44	Heath Scotland	Western Jets	Collingwood
3	45	Aaron Shattock	Woodville-West Torrens Eagles	Brisbane Lions
3	46	Jay Solomon	Geelong Falcons	Western Bulldogs
3	47	Nicolas Lowther	Preston Knights	North Melbourne
3	48	Lucas Herbert	North Adelaide Football Club	Adelaide
4	49	Garth Taylor	Swan Districts Football Club	Fremantle
4	50	Damien Adkins	Gippsland Power	Collingwood
4	51	David Loats	Geelong Falcons	Hawthorn
4	52	Ryan O'Connor	Essendon	Sydney Swans
4	53	Troy Schwarze	Prahran Dragons	St Kilda
4	54	Derek Murray	Murray Bushrangers	Port Adelaide
4	55	Marc Dragicevic	Geelong Falcons	Richmond
4	56	Ilija Grgic	West Coast Eagles	Essendon
4	57	Andrew Embley	Swan Districts	West Coast Eagles
4	58	Ian Prendergast	Oakleigh Chargers	Carlton
4	59	Dwayne Simpson	East Fremantle Football Club	Sydney Swans
4	60	Luke Speers	Tassie Mariners	Melbourne
4	61	Ricky Symes	Murray Bushrangers	Western Bulldogs
4	62	Tim van der Klooster	Geelong Falcons	North Melbourne
4	63	Clint Kirey	East Fremantle Football Club	Adelaide
5	64	Andrew Shipp	Springvale Scorpions	Fremantle
5	65	Lee Walker	Collingwood	Collingwood
5	66	Steven Rode	Dandenong Stingrays	Hawthorn
5	67	Brett Backwell	Northern Eagles, QAFL	Carlton
5	68	Matthew Greig	Richmond Supplementary List	Richmond
5	69	Scott Bennett	East Fremantle Football Club	West Coast Eagles
5	70	Kurt Heazlewood	Tassie Mariners	St Kilda
5	71	Simon Feast	Sturt Football Club	Sydney Swans
5	72	Luke Taylor	Port Adelaide Magpies	Melbourne
5	73	Christin Macri	Western Bulldogs Supplementary List	Western Bulldogs
5	74	Adam Lange	Sturt Football Club	North Melbourne
5	75	Ken McGregor	Woodville-West Torrens Eagles	Adelaide
6	76	Rupert Betheras	Collingwood Supplementary List	Collingwood
6	77	Adrian Cox	Gippsland Power	Hawthorn
6	78	Pass		Carlton
6	79	Ray Hall	NSW/ACT Rams	Richmond
6	80	Brodie Atkinson	Sturt Football Club	Adelaide
6	81	Jacob Anstey	Carlton	St Kilda
6	82	Pass		Sydney Swans
6	83	Pass		Melbourne
6	84	Pass		Western Bulldogs
6	85	Shannon Motlop	North Adelaide Football Club	North Melbourne
7	86	Kris Barlow	Hawthorn Supplementary List	Hawthorn
7	87	Pass		Carlton
7	88	Pass		Richmond
7	89	Joel Duckworth	East Fremantle Football Club	West Coast Eagles
7	90	Shane Clayton	Brisbane Lions	North Melbourne
8	91	Pass		Hawthorn

== Trades ==
Player	Original Club	New Club
Matthew Lappin	St Kilda	Carlton
Tyson Lane	Western Bulldogs	Collingwood
Paul Licuria	Sydney Swans	Collingwood
Kingsley Hunter	Fremantle	Western Bulldogs
Tony Modra	Adelaide Crows	Fremantle
Brad Wira	Western Bulldogs	Fremantle
Tom Harley	Port Adelaide	Geelong
Jason Mooney	Sydney Swans	Geelong
Brett O'Farrell	Sydney Swans	Hawthorn
Ricky Olarenshaw	Essendon	Collingwood
Che Cockatoo-Collins	Essendon	Port Adelaide
Jarrad Schofield	West Coast Eagles	Port Adelaide
Craig Biddiscombe	Geelong	Richmond
Rory Hilton	Brisbane Lions	Richmond
Scott Cummings	Port Adelaide	West Coast Eagles
Chad Rintoul	Adelaide Crows	West Coast Eagles
Simon Arnott	Sydney Swans	Geelong
Andrew Bomford	Essendon	Sydney Swans
Scott Chisholm	Fremantle	Melbourne
Adam Heuskes	Port Adelaide	Brisbane Lions
Tristan Lynch	Brisbane Lions	Geelong
Josh Mahoney	Collingwood	Western Bulldogs
Martin McKinnon	Geelong	Brisbane Lions
Mark Orchard	Sydney Swans	Collingwood
Scott Bamford	Brisbane Lions	Geelong
Nick Carter	Brisbane Lions	Melbourne

== 1999 pre-season draft ==
Pick	Player	Recruited from	Recruited to
1	David Calthorpe	Essendon	Brisbane Lions
2	Ashley Prescott	Richmond	Fremantle
3	Glenn Freeborn	Kangaroos	Collingwood
4	Anthony Rock	Kangaroos	Hawthorn
5	Jared Poulton	Port Adelaide Magpies	Port Adelaide
6	Clay Sampson	Adelaide Crows	Richmond
7	Tony Francis	Collingwood	St Kilda
8	Scott Russell	Collingwood	Sydney Swans
9	Troy Simmonds	Box Hill Hawks	Melbourne
10	Cameron McKenzie-McHarg	Oakleigh Chargers	Western Bulldogs
11	John Spaull	Rosebud	Kangaroos
12	Darryl Wintle	North Adelaide	Adelaide Crows
13	Cameron Venables	Claremont	Collingwood
14	Pass		Hawthorn
15	Pass		Richmond
16	Daniel Wulf	Dandenong U18	Western Bulldogs

== 1999 rookie draft ==
Round	Pick	Player	Recruited from	Club
1	1	Shannon Rusca	Southern Districts	Brisbane Lions
1	2	Darren Bolton	Peel Thunder	Fremantle
1	3	Jeremy Sharpen	North Shore	Collingwood
1	4	John Baird	Eastern Ranges	Hawthorn
1	5	Derek Wirth	Brisbane Lions	Geelong
1	6	Heath Culpitt	Castlemaine	Carlton
1	7	Scott Bassett	Port Adelaide	Port Adelaide
1	8	Robbie Taylor	Richmond (reserves)	Richmond
1	9	Simon Duckworth	West Perth	West Coast
1	10	James Gowans	Werribee	St Kilda
1	11	Gerrard Bennett	Sydney	Geelong
1	12	Troy Broadbridge	Port Adelaide	Melbourne
1	13	Chris Dunne	Assumption College	Western Bulldogs
1	14	Winis Imbi	Essendon (reserves)	Kangaroos
1	15	Stuart Bown	Norwood	Adelaide
2	16	Passed	N/A	Brisbane Lions
2	17	Ashley Clancy	Subiaco	Fremantle
2	18	Matthew Manfield	Richmond	Collingwood
2	19	Glen Bowyer	Hawthorn (reserves)	Hawthorn
2	20	Danny O'Brien	Gippsland Power	Geelong
2	21	Damian Lang	Carlton	Carlton
2	22	Tim Masierowski	Central District	Port Adelaide
2	23	Teghan Henderson	Calder Cannons	Richmond
2	24	Mark Pearson	West Perth	West Coast
2	25	Chris Gowans	Werribee	St Kilda
2	26	Paul Allison	North Hobart	Sydney
2	27	Cameron Ramsay	Oakleigh Chargers	Melbourne
2	28	Matthew Pearce	Western Jets	Brisbane Lions
2	29	Kent Kingsley	Kangaroos	Kangaroos
2	30	Dean Howard	West Adelaide	Adelaide
3	31	Passed	N/A	Brisbane Lions
3	32	Antoni Grover	Subiaco	Fremantle
3	33	Craig Anderson	Essendon (VFL)	Collingwood
3	34	Passed	N/A	Hawthorn
3	35	Kaine Marsh	North Shore	Port Adelaide
3	36	Don Webb	Gippsland Power	Port Adelaide
3	37	Passed	N/A	Richmond
3	38	Andrew Taylor	West Perth	West Coast
3	39	Garth Pickford	North Ballarat	St Kilda
3	40	Brett Kirk	North Albury	Sydney
3	41	Adam Contessa	Western Bulldogs	Western Bulldogs
3	42	Marcus Nalder	Bendigo Pioneers	Kangaroos
3	43	Matthew Golding	Glenelg	Adelaide
4	44	Jeff Cooper	Northern Eagles	Brisbane Lions
4	45	Andrew Smith	Subiaco	Fremantle
4	46	Troy Kirwen	Collingwood	Collingwood
4	47	Passed	N/A	Hawthorn
4	48	Passed	N/A	Port Adelaide
4	49	Chad Davis	Oakleigh Chargers	St Kilda
4	50	Jeremy Jacques	NSW/ACT Rams	Sydney
4	51	Passed	N/A	Western Bulldogs
4	52	Ryan Pagan	Kangaroos (reserves)	Kangaroos
4	53	Jarrod Twitt	Sturt	Adelaide
5	54	Trent Knobel	Broadbeach	Brisbane Lions
5	55	Passed	N/A	Hawthorn
5	56	Passed	N/A	Port Adelaide
5	57	Passed	N/A	St Kilda
5	58	Linden Stevens	Adelaide	Adelaide
6	59	Scott Ralph	Morningside	Brisbane Lions
6	60	Passed	N/A	Hawthorn
6	61	Passed	N/A	St Kilda
6	62	Scott Matthews	Port Adelaide	Adelaide

== Rookie elevation ==
This list details 1998-listed rookies who were elevated to the senior list; it does not list players taken as rookies in the rookie draft which occurred during the 1998/99 off-season.

Player	Recruited from	Recruited to
Ben Marsh	West Adelaide Football Club	Adelaide Crows
Scott Freeborn	Woodville-West Torrens Eagles	Carlton
Tarkyn Lockyer	East Fremantle Football Club	Collingwood
Mark Johnson	Calder Cannons	Essendon
Brad Dodd	East Fremantle Football Club	Fremantle
Peter Walsh	West Adelaide Football Club	Melbourne
Daniel Ward	Fitzroy Reserves	Melbourne
Barnaby French	Sturt Football Club	Port Adelaide
Greg Tivendale	Rythdale-Officer-Cardinia Football Club	Richmond
Chad Fletcher	Subiaco Football Club	West Coast Eagles
Laurie Bellotti	Claremont Football Club	West Coast Eagles
Paul Maher	Perth Football Club	Fremantle
Matthew Bishop	Box Hill Hawks	Melbourne
Sudjai Cook	Norwood Football Club	Adelaide Crows
Tate Day	Gold Coast Football Club	Brisbane Lions
Damian Lang	Leeton Football Club	Carlton
Jason MacPherson	Ganmain-Grong Grong-Matong Football Club	Sydney Swans

== See also ==
- Official AFL Draft page
