= Adam Morgan =

Adam Morgan may refer to:

- Adam Morgan (Australian footballer) (born 1981), Australian rules footballer
- Adam Morgan (baseball) (born 1990), baseball player
- Adam Morgan (English footballer) (born 1994), English footballer
- Adam Morgan (Hollyoaks), Hollyoaks character
- Adam Morgan (racing driver) (born 1988), English racing driver
- Adam Morgan (politician) (born 1989), American politician

== See also ==
- Adams Morgan, neighborhood in Northwest Washington, D.C.
