= Scott Bennett (footballer) =

Australian rules footballer

Personal information
- Full name: Scott Andrew Bennett
- Born: 8 January 1980 (age 46)
- Original team: Willetton Juniors
- Draft: 69th, 1998 AFL draft
- Height: 180 cm (5 ft 11 in)
- Weight: 71 kg (157 lb)

Playing career^{1}
Years	Club	Games (Goals)
1999	Claremont	19 (5)
2000	West Coast Eagles	1 (0)
2000–2001	East Fremantle	22 (8)
2006	Peel Thunder	19 (2)
- ^{1} Playing statistics correct to the end of 2006.

Scott Andrew Bennett (born 8 January 1980) is a former Australian rules footballer who played with the West Coast Eagles in the Australian Football League (AFL).

Bennett appeared in just one senior game for the Eagles, against Melbourne at Docklands. He had four kicks, four handballs, took one mark and laid three tackles.

Mostly used a wingman and half back, Bennett played with three WAFL clubs.

After being out for four seasons, he made a return to the league in 2006 when he turned out for Peel Thunder.
