= James White (Australian footballer) =

Australian rules footballer

Personal information
- Full name: James White
- Born: 21 January 1980 (age 46)
- Original team: Oakleigh Chargers (TAC Cup)
- Draft: No. 40, 1998 AFL draft

Playing career^{1}
Years	Club	Games (Goals)
2000	Richmond	4 (1)
- ^{1} Playing statistics correct to the end of 2012.

James White (born 21 January 1980) is a former Australian rules footballer who played with Richmond in the Australian Football League (AFL) in 2000.
