= David Clarke (Australian footballer, born 1980) =

Australian rules footballer, born 1952

David Clarke Jr.

Personal information
- Full name: David Andrew Clarke
- Born: 15 May 1980 (age 46)
- Original team: Geelong Falcons
- Draft: 21st, 1998 National draft
- Height: 183 cm (6 ft 0 in)
- Weight: 84 kg (185 lb)

Playing career^{1}
Years	Club	Games (Goals)
1999–2003	Geelong	89 (48)
2004–2005	Carlton	12 (2)
Total		101 (50)
- ^{1} Playing statistics correct to the end of 2005.

David Andrew Clarke (born 15 May 1980) is a former Australian rules footballer who played with Geelong and Carlton in the Australian Football League (AFL).

Originally from Torquay, Clarke was a father/son selection by Geelong, who used a second round pick on him. Coming from a strong sporting family, his father David Clarke Sr played over 200 games for Geelong and his brother Tim played with Hawthorn, while his sister is Olympic runner Georgie Clarke.

Clarke, a pacy wingman, graduated from the Geelong Falcons to make his AFL debut in 1999. He was a prolific ball winner but was often let down by kicking and put together 68 consecutive games from 2000 to 2003. Clarke had the second largest number of disposals for Geelong in 2001 and 2002, averaging 17 a game in both seasons.

He struggled with both his form and injuries in 2003 and was involved in a three-way trade in that year's draft, where Hawthorn received Simon Beaumont and Geelong got David Loats. Clarke ended up at Carlton and played ten games in the 2004 AFL season. With his first appearance in 2005 he brought up his 100th AFL game, against Adelaide at Football Park, but played just once more for Carlton. He was delisted at the end of 2005.

From 2006 until 2007, Clarke played with South Adelaide in the SANFL. In 2008, he switched to North Adelaide, and played there until 2009. In 2010, Clarke returned to the city of Geelong, and joined St Mary's in the Geelong Football League (GFL), where he played until 2012.

In July 2012, Clarke was suspended for 15 weeks for crouching behind and tripping a GFL umpire, who was running backwards after a ball-up. The incident brought Clarke's cumulative career suspensions to 20 matches, which resulted in his deregistration under the nationwide Player Deregistration Policy, bringing an end to Clarke's playing career.

Following on from his lifetime ban, a reborn Clarke continued his career in country Victoria, playing for the Mansfield Football Club in the Goulburn Valley Football Netball League, and Lockington-Bamawm United in the Heathcote District Football League.
