= Michael O'Brien (Australian rules footballer) =

Australian rules footballer, born 1980

Personal information
- Full name: Michael O'Brien
- Born: 25 July 1980 (age 46)
- Original team: Bendigo Pioneers
- Height: 180 cm (5 ft 11 in)
- Weight: 82 kg (181 lb)

Playing career^{1}
Years	Club	Games (Goals)
2000	West Coast Eagles	2 (0)
- ^{1} Playing statistics correct to the end of 2000.

Michael O'Brien (born 25 July 1980) is a former Australian rules footballer in the Australian Football League.

He was recruited to the West Coast Eagles in the 1998 AFL draft and struggled for consistency in his time at the club, playing just 2 games in the 2000 season.

During his time at the Eagles he played 16 games for WAFL club East Perth and was a member of their 2000 premiership team.
