= Steven Rode =

Australian rules footballer

Personal information
- Full name: Steven Rode
- Born: 6 April 1980 (age 46)
- Original team: Dandenong Stingrays (TAC Cup)
- Draft: No. 66, 1998 AFL draft

Playing career^{1}
Years	Club	Games (Goals)
2000	Hawthorn	1 (0)
- ^{1} Playing statistics correct to the end of 2012.

Steven Rode (born 6 April 1980) is a former Australian rules footballer who played with Hawthorn in the Australian Football League (AFL) in 2000.
