= John Spaull =

Australian rules footballer (born 1977)

Personal information
- Full name: John Spaull
- Born: 20 August 1977 (age 49)
- Original team: Rosebud
- Height: 184 cm (6 ft 0 in)
- Weight: 90 kg (198 lb)

Playing career^{1}
Years	Club	Games (Goals)
2000–2001	Kangaroos	8 (5)
- ^{1} Playing statistics correct to the end of 2001.

John Spaull (born 20 August 1977) is an Australian rules footballer who played for North Melbourne in 2000 and 2001.

He was drafted in the 1999 Pre-season Draft with the 11th selection from the Rosebud Football Club in the Mornington Peninsula Nepean Football League. He played eight games in two seasons at the Kangaroos before he was delisted at the end of the 2001 season.
