= Cameron Venables =

Australian rules footballer

Personal information
- Full name: Cameron Venables
- Born: 29 October 1975 (age 51)
- Original team: Claremont
- Draft: 13th, 1999 Pre-Season Draft
- Height: 193 cm (6 ft 4 in)
- Weight: 88 kg (194 lb)

Playing career^{1}
Years	Club	Games (Goals)
1999	Collingwood	3 (0)
- ^{1} Playing statistics correct to the end of 1999.

Cameron Venables (born 29 October 1975) is a former Australian rules footballer who played with Collingwood in the Australian Football League (AFL).

Venables, a defender, started his career at the Subiaco Football Club and was rookie listed by AFL club Fremantle. He crossed to Claremont for the 1998 season and at the end of the year was picked up by Collingwood in the 1999 Pre-Season Draft. After playing only three senior games in 1999 he was delisted by Collingwood and spent the next two seasons with Glenelg, before returning to Claremont.
