= Christin Macri =

Australian rules footballer

Personal information
- Full name: Christin Macri
- Born: 28 August 1974 (age 52)
- Original team: Leongatha / Central District
- Height: 189 cm (6 ft 2 in)
- Weight: 92 kg (203 lb)

Playing career^{1}
Years	Club	Games (Goals)
1999–2000	Western Bulldogs	5 (3)
- ^{1} Playing statistics correct to the end of 2000.

Christin Macri (born 28 August 1974) is a former Australian rules footballer who played with the Western Bulldogs in the Australian Football League (AFL) and Central District in the South Australian National Football League (SANFL).

Originally from Leongatha, Victoria, Macri played with Central District in the SANFL before being added to the Western Bulldog's supplementary list. He was promoted to the senior list in the 1998 AFL draft and was already 24 by the time he made his AFL debut, against Carlton in round 18 of the 1999 season. A midfielder, he appeared in the following two rounds as well but played just two further games for the club after that, both in 2000.

Delisted at the end of the 2000 season, Macri joined East Wagga in 2001, then played with the Wodonga Raiders from 2002 to 2004, as captain-coach for the final two years, before heading to Victorian Football League (VFL) club Williamstown in 2005. He was later a premiership coach at Ganmain-Grong Grong Matong.
