= Murray Vance =

Australian rules footballer

Personal information
- Full name: Murray Vance
- Born: 12 April 1980 (age 46)
- Original team: Shepparton United / Murray Bushrangers
- Draft: 6th overall, 1998 National draft
- Height: 189 cm (6 ft 2 in)
- Weight: 85 kg (187 lb)

Playing career^{1}
Years	Club	Games (Goals)
1999–2001	Carlton	5 (1)
- ^{1} Playing statistics correct to the end of 2001.

Murray Vance (born 12 April 1980) is a former Australian rules footballer who played with Carlton in the Australian Football League. Drafted with Carlton's first selection in 1998, Vance debuted the following year and played four senior games, but spent the majority of the season with the reserves, finishing second in their best and fairest. Plagued by injuries in 2000, he failed to play senior game that year. The following season Vance made just one senior appearance, before being dropped and again being beset by injuries. He was delisted by Carlton at the end of 2001 and went on to play for the Bendigo Bombers in the Victorian Football League.

== Sources ==
- Holmesby, Russell & Main, Jim (2009). The Encyclopedia of AFL Footballers. 8th ed. Melbourne: Bas Publishing.
- Murray Vance's playing statistics from AFL Tables
- Murray Vance's profile at Blueseum
