= Adam Morgan (Australian footballer) =

Australian rules footballer

Personal information
- Born: 28 October 1981 (age 45)
- Original team: Oakleigh Chargers (TAC Cup)
- Debut: Round 15, 2002, Port Adelaide vs. Sydney, at the SCG
- Height: 195 cm (6 ft 5 in)
- Weight: 96 kg (212 lb)

Playing career^{1}
Years	Club	Games (Goals)
2002–2003	Port Adelaide	3 (0)
2004–2006	Western Bulldogs	14 (6)
Total		17 (6)
- ^{1} Playing statistics correct to the end of 2006.

Adam Morgan (born 28 October 1981) is a former Australian rules footballer who played in the Australian Football League (AFL).

== AFL career ==
=== Port Adelaide career (2002–2003) ===
Overlooking the chance to recruit Brendan Fevola, Port Adelaide opted for Morgan in the 1998 National Draft. After only playing two seasons at Port, he was traded to the Western Bulldogs 2003 trade period. He had only managed to play three senior games at Port.

=== Western Bulldogs career (2004–2006) ===
He was recruited by the Western Bulldogs as a key position player that could play in the forward line or defence, but following two successive season ending injuries in 2005 and 2006, Morgan was delisted by the Bulldogs at the end of the 2006 season.
