= James Begley =

Australian rules footballer

Personal information
- Born: 22 July 1980 (age 46)
- Original team: Sturt Football Club (SANFL)
- Draft: No. 22, 1998 National Draft
- Height: 189 cm (6 ft 2 in)
- Weight: 84 kg (185 lb)

Playing career^{1}
Years	Club	Games (Goals)
1999–2002	St Kilda	36 (7)
2003–2005	Adelaide	25 (3)
Total		61 (10)
- ^{1} Playing statistics correct to the end of 2005.

Career highlights
- AFL Rising Star nominee 2001

James Begley (born 22 July 1980) is a former Australian rules footballer who played for St Kilda and Adelaide in the Australian Football League (AFL) and Sturt Football Club in the South Australian National Football League (SANFL).

Begley had a promising career ahead of him after being named an AFL Rising Star nominee in 2001. In 2002, he returned to his hometown of Adelaide to play with the Crows.

However, he was plagued by injuries and only played 25 games with Adelaide before retiring at the end of the 2005 AFL season. He was nominated for CLEO Bachelor of the Year.

Begley was probably best remembered for a highly publicised incident with Byron Pickett, who was subsequently suspended for 6 games for a hip and shoulder hit he put on Begley while he put his head down to pick up the ball.

Begley lives in Perth, and works for Tract Group and PickStar.
