= Gerrard Bennett =

Australian rules footballer

Personal information
- Full name: Gerrard Bennett
- Born: 9 April 1979 (age 47)
- Original team: Tassie Mariners
- Draft: 18th, 1996 National Draft
- Height: 187 cm (6 ft 2 in)
- Weight: 94 kg (207 lb)

Playing career^{1}
Years	Club	Games (Goals)
1997–1998	Geelong	0 (0)
1999–2002	Sydney Swans	32 (11)
- ^{1} Playing statistics correct to the end of 2002.

Gerrard Bennett (born 9 April 1979) is a former Australian rules footballer who played with the Sydney Swans in the Australian Football League (AFL).

Bennett played for the Tassie Mariners in the TAC Cup. His TFL Statewide League club was North Hobart.

Geelong secured the services of Bennett in the 1996 National Draft, with pick 18. He suffered a knee injury in 1997 and was delisted by the club without playing a senior AFL game.

A defender, Bennett was given a second chance when Sydney added him to their rookie list and he played 32 games for the Swans over four seasons. When not playing at Sydney during that time he made appearances for the Port Melbourne Football Club and won their best and fairest award in 2001.

After being delisted by the Swans, Bennett played in the SANFL with South Adelaide. He made 113 appearances for the club, before retiring in 2008.
