= David Loats =

Australian rules footballer

Personal information
- Full name: David Loats
- Born: 13 February 1981 (age 45)
- Original team: Geelong Falcons
- Height: 200 cm (6 ft 7 in)
- Weight: 98 kg (216 lb)

Playing career^{1}
Years	Club	Games (Goals)
2002 – 2003	Hawthorn	11 (3)
2004	Geelong	1 (0)
Total		12 (3)
- ^{1} Playing statistics correct to the end of 2006.

David Loats (born 13 February 1981) is a former Australian rules footballer. Loats played five seasons for Hawthorn in 1999–2003, before playing one season for Geelong in 2004, in the AFL.
