= Stuart Bown =

Australian rules footballer (born 1978)

Personal information
- Born: 24 August 1978 (age 48); Broken Hill, New South Wales
- Original team: West Broken Hill
- Draft: NA
- Height: 191 cm (6 ft 3 in)
- Weight: 91 kg (201 lb)
- Position: Key Position / Defence

Club information
- Current club: Norwood (SANFL)
- Number: 22

Playing career^{1}
Years	Club	Games (Goals)
1999–2008, 2010–	Norwood (SANFL)	200 (144)
2001	Adelaide (AFL)	4 (1)
Total		204 (145)
- ^{1} Playing statistics correct to the end of 2011.

Career highlights
- Norwood Redlegs Under 19's Best & Fairest 1997; Norwood Redlegs Under 19's Premiership Player 1997; Norwood Redlegs Reserves Best & Fairest 1998; Norwood Redlegs Reserves Premiership Player 1998; SANFL Debut: Round 3, 1999 Norwood vs Central District; AFL Debut: Round 4, 2001 Adelaide vs Hawthorn at York Park; SANFL 200 Club Member

Stuart Bown (born 24 August 1978) is a former Australian rules footballer who played in the Australian Football League (AFL) for the Adelaide Crows and for Norwood in the South Australian National Football League (SANFL).

Bown was recruited by Norwood from the West Broken Hill Robins and played a couple of seasons in the lower grades before making his league debut in 1999. He won the clubs Under 19's Best & Fairest award in 1997 as well as playing in the Redlegs SANFL U/19 Premiership the same year. He moved to the Reserves in 1998 and repeated his 1997 success by winning the Reserves Best & Fairest and playing in Norwood's SANFL Reserves Premiership. He made his league debut for the Redlegs against Central District in Round 3 of the 1999 season.

His form with Norwood (and obvious potential) was such that he was added to the Adelaide Crows Rookie List in 2000. He was elevated to the senior list in 2001 and made his AFL debut for the Crows against Hawthorn at York Park in Launceston, Tasmania. Bown would go on to make four appearances for the Crows during 2001 before he was de-listed at the end of the season.

Stuart Bown played in Norwood's losing 1999 SANFL Grand Final team that went down to Port Adelaide by just 8 points denying him the rare distinction of winning the U/19, Reserves and League Grand Finals in successive seasons with the same club. Bown continued to be a solid contributor for Norwood until he retired at the end of the 2008 season. After sitting out 2009 he returned to Norwood in 2010 and helped the club to its first league Grand Final since 1999. Unfortunately for Bown and the Redlegs they were again defeated, this time by Centrals by only 6 points in what was the closest Grand Final since 1999.

Bown continued into the 2011 SANFL season helping the 'Legs to 2nd on the SANFL ladder after the Minor Round. He played his 200th game for Norwood in the Preliminary Final loss to Woodville-West Torrens.

== Honours ==
- Norwood Under 19's Best & Fairest: 1997
- Norwood Under 19's Premiership Player: 1997
- Norwood Reserves Best & Fairest: 1998
- Norwood Reserves Premiership Player: 1998
- SANFL 200 Club Member
