= Lucas Herbert (footballer) =

Australian rules footballer

Personal information
- Full name: Lucas Herbert
- Born: 13 September 1977 (age 49); Mount Gambier, South Australia
- Original team: North Adelaide (SANFL)
- Draft: 48th, 1998 AFL draft
- Height: 198 cm (6 ft 6 in)
- Weight: 94 kg (207 lb)

Playing career^{1}
Years	Club	Games (Goals)
1999	Adelaide	14 (1)
- ^{1} Playing statistics correct to the end of 1999.

Lucas Herbert (born 13 September 1977) is a former Australian rules footballer who played with Adelaide in the Australian Football League (AFL).

Herbert was a primarily a ruckman, but could also play as a key forward. Originally from Mount Gambier, he started his South Australian National Football League (SANFL) career at Glenelg but was with North Adelaide when he was chosen by Adelaide in the 1998 AFL draft. Although Adelaide were premiers of the previous two years, Herbert was picked for the opening round of the 1999 AFL season against the Western Bulldogs and had 10 disposals, 14 hit outs and a goal. He made a further 13 appearances in 1999 and finished the year with the second most hit outs at Adelaide, behind David Pittman, but would be delisted.

Herbert continued playing for North Adelaide before returning to Glenelg in 2004.

Herbert joined the police force in 2002, while continuing to play in the SANFL. As a senior constable in 2012, Herbert was commended for rescuing a woman from a burning building in Plympton, South Australia.
