= Darryl Wintle =

Australian rules footballer (born 1976)

Personal information
- Full name: Darryl Wintle
- Born: 7 April 1976 (age 50)
- Original team: North Adelaide
- Draft: 12th, 1999 Pre-Season draft
- Height: 179 cm (5 ft 10 in)
- Weight: 80 kg (176 lb)

Playing career^{1}
Years	Club	Games (Goals)
1999	Adelaide	3 (0)
- ^{1} Playing statistics correct to the end of 1999.

Darryl Wintle (born 7 April 1976) is an Australian rules footballer who played with Adelaide in the Australian Football League (AFL).

Wintle trained at the Kangaroos but it was reigning premiers Adelaide who picked him up in the 1999 Pre-Season draft, with the third last selection. He made three appearances, early in the 1999 AFL season, but was delisted at the end of the year.

He returned to North Adelaide and in 2002 was appointed club captain. The club finished with the wooden spoon in his second year as captain but he would lead North Adelaide to a grand final in 2007, which they lost to Central District. Wintle is just the third North Adelaide player to captain 100 games, after Ian McKay and Don Lindner. He retired at the end of the 2008 season, after playing 186 SANFL games, but has continued playing in the South Australian Amateur Football League with Broadview, who he also coaches.
