= 2002 AFL draft =

Draft for the Australian Football League

General information
- Date: 24 November 2002
- Network: Fox Sports
- Sponsored by: National Australia Bank

Overview
- League: AFL
- First selection: Brendon Goddard (St Kilda)

The 2002 AFL draft consisted of a pre-season draft, a national draft, a trade period and the elevation of rookies. The AFL draft is the annual draft of talented players by Australian rules football teams that participate in the main competition of that sport, the Australian Football League.

In 2002 there were 88 picks to be drafted between 16 teams in the national draft.

Carlton forfeited its priority and first round draft picks due to gross salary cap breaches (it would have also forfeited its second round pick, but they had already traded it to Port Adelaide for Barnaby French). Carlton's punishment came on the back of a dismal 2002 season in which it won its first ever wooden spoon after 105 years of competition. The first pick therefore went to St Kilda, who finished second last during the 2002 AFL season.

This was the first draft since their introduction in 1993 that no team received a priority pick, as St Kilda had a record of 5–16–1 (giving them 22 premiership points, above the 20.5 premiership points needed to qualify for a priority pick under the rules at the time).

== Trades ==
Player	Original club	New club	Traded for
Damien Adkins	Collingwood	West Coast Eagles	Andrew Williams
Justin Blumfield	Essendon	Richmond	draft pick #28
Barry Brooks	Port Adelaide	St Kilda	draft pick #6 & #31
Leigh Brown	Fremantle	Kangaroos	draft pick #13
Ronnie Burns	Geelong	Adelaide Crows	Ben Finnin
Blake Caracella	Essendon	Brisbane Lions	Damian Cupido and draft pick #15
Wayne Carey	Kangaroos	Adelaide Crows	draft picks #2 and #18
Daniel Chick	Hawthorn	West Coast Eagles	draft pick #8
Stuart Cochrane	Kangaroos	Port Adelaide	Michael Stevens
Damien Cupido	Brisbane Lions	Essendon	Blake Caracella
Nick Davis	Collingwood	Sydney Swans	draft pick #21
Peter Everitt	St Kilda	Hawthorn	draft picks #6 and #22
Ben Finnin	Adelaide Crows	Geelong	Ronnie Burns
Barnaby French	Port Adelaide	Carlton	draft pick #16
Des Headland	Brisbane Lions	Fremantle	draft picks #3 and #19
Chris Heffernan and pick #15	Essendon	Melbourne	draft pick #10
Kingsley Hunter	Western Bulldogs	Hawthorn	draft pick #35
Kane Johnson	Adelaide Crows	Richmond	Jason Torney, draft picks #2, #18 and #32
Adam McPhee	Fremantle	Essendon	draft pick #55
Luke Penny	Western Bulldogs	St Kilda	draft pick #17
Byron Pickett	Kangaroos	Port Adelaide	draft pick #13 and #31
Michael Stevens	Port Adelaide	Kangaroos	Stuart Cochrane
Jason Torney	Richmond	Adelaide Crows	Kane Johnson and draft picks #12, #28 and #41
Andrew Williams	West Coast Eagles	Collingwood	Damien Adkins
Shane Woewodin	Melbourne	Collingwood	draft pick #14

== 2002 national draft ==
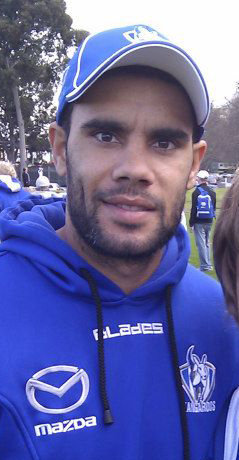
Daniel Wells, pick 2

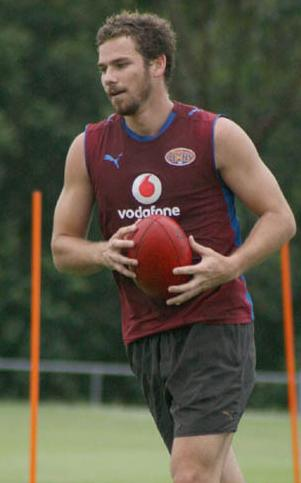
Jared Brennan, pick 3

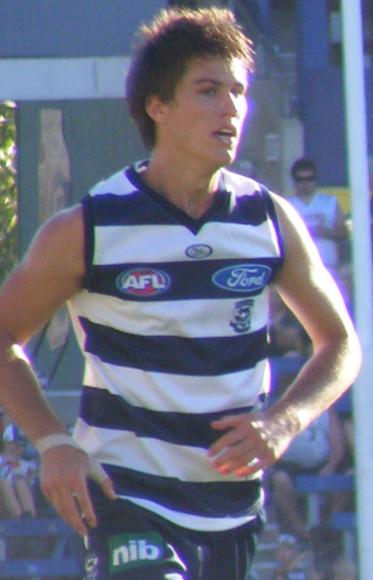
Andrew Mackie, pick 7

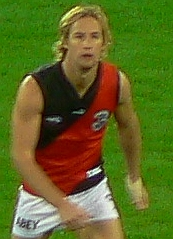
Jason Winderlich, pick 11

*	Denotes player who has been a premiership player and been selected for at least one All-Australian team
^{+}	Denotes player who has been a premiership player at least once
^{x}	Denotes player who has been selected for at least one All-Australian team
^{~}	Denotes player who has been selected as Rising Star

Round	Pick	Player	Recruited from	Club
1	1	Brendon Goddard	Gippsland Power	St Kilda
1	2	Daniel Wells	Peel Thunder	Kangaroos
1	3	Jared Brennan	Southern Districts	Brisbane Lions
1	4	Tim Walsh	Northern Knights	Western Bulldogs
1	5	Jarrad McVeigh	NSW/ACT Rams	Sydney Swans
1	6	Steven Salopek	Dandenong Stingrays	Port Adelaide
1	7	Andrew Mackie	Glenelg	Geelong
1	8	Luke Brennan	North Ballarat Rebels	Hawthorn
1	9	Hamish McIntosh	Murray Bushrangers	Kangaroos
1	10	Jason Laycock	Tassie Mariners	Essendon
1	11	Jason Winderlich	Gippsland Power	Essendon
1	12	Jay Schulz	Woodville-West Torrens	Richmond
1	13	Byron Schammer	West Adelaide	Fremantle
1	14	Daniel Bell	Glenelg	Melbourne
1	15	Nicholas Smith	Norwood	Melbourne
2	16	Stephen Gilham	Oakleigh Chargers	Port Adelaide
2	17	Cameron Faulkner	Central District	Western Bulldogs
2	18	Kris Shore	Eastern Ranges	Kangaroos
2	19	Troy Selwood	Bendigo Pioneers	Brisbane Lions
2	20	Will Minson	Norwood	Western Bulldogs
2	21	Bo Nixon	Calder Cannons	Collingwood
2	22	Matthew Ferguson	Gippsland Power	St Kilda
2	23	Tom Lonergan	Calder Cannons	Geelong
2	24	Paul Johnson	Dandenong Stingrays	West Coast Eagles
2	25	Callum Urch	Western Jets	Kangaroos
2	26	Jared Rivers	North Adelaide	Melbourne
2	27	Darren Walsh	Sandringham Dragons	Essendon
2	28	Tristan Cartledge	North Ballarat Rebels	Essendon
2	29	Luke Shackleton	Tassie Mariners	Collingwood
2	30	Daniel Merrett	Southport	Brisbane Lions
3	31	Joel Perry	Eastern Ranges	Kangaroos
3	32	Luke Jericho	West Adelaide	Adelaide Crows
3	33	Brad Murphy	Calder Cannons	Western Bulldogs
3 F/S	34	Sean Dempster	Gippsland Power	Sydney Swans
3	35	Scott Bassett	Port Adelaide	Western Bulldogs
3 F/S	36	Tim Callan	Geelong Falcons	Geelong
3	37	Brent Staker	NSW/ACT Rams	West Coast Eagles
3	38	Blake Grima	Eastern Ranges	Kangaroos
3	39	Gary Moorcroft	Essendon	Melbourne
3 F/S	40	Jobe Watson	Sandringham Dragons	Essendon
3	41	Tim Fleming	Carlton	Richmond
3 F/S	42	Brett Ebert	Port Adelaide Magpies	Port Adelaide
3 F/S	43	Cameron Cloke	Eastern Ranges	Collingwood
3	44	Anthony Corrie	Nightcliff	Brisbane Lions
4	45	Kade Simpson	Eastern Ranges	Carlton
4	46	Leigh Fisher	Sandringham Dragons	St Kilda
4	47	Bill Nicholls	Hawthorn	Richmond
4	48	Greg Edgcumbe	Eastern Ranges	Fremantle
4	49	Cameron Wight	Calder Cannons	Western Bulldogs
4	50	Josh Thewlis	Bendigo Pioneers	Sydney Swans
4	51	Tim Boyle	Geelong Falcons	Hawthorn
4	52	Pass		Geelong
4	53	Adam Selwood	Bendigo Pioneers	West Coast Eagles
4	54	Cameron Hunter	Calder Cannons	Melbourne
4	55	Ryan Crowley	Calder Cannons	Fremantle
4	56	Robert Shirley	Adelaide	Adelaide
4	57	Wade Champion	West Adelaide	Port Adelaide
4	58	David King	Glenelg	Collingwood
4	59	Pass		Brisbane Lions
5	60	Cameron Croad	Oakleigh Chargers	Carlton
5	61	Pass		St Kilda
5	62	Daniel Sipthorp	Calder Cannons	Richmond
5	63	Brett Doswell	NSW/ACT Rams	Fremantle
5	64	Nick Malceski	Eastern Ranges	Sydney Swans
5	65	Lochlan Veale	Geelong Falcons	Hawthorn
5	66	Ryan Ferguson	Frankston	Melbourne
5	67	Steven Alessio	Essendon	Essendon
5	68	James Begley	St Kilda	Adelaide Crows
5	69	Pass		Port Adelaide
5	70	Matthew Lokan	Port Adelaide Magpies	Collingwood
5	71	Pass		Brisbane Lions
6	72	Brad Fisher	Eastern Ranges	Carlton
6	73	Pass		St Kilda
6	74	Pass		Richmond
6	75	Pass		Fremantle
6	76	Pass		Sydney Swans
6	77	Pass		Adelaide Crows
6	78	Pass		Brisbane Lions
7	79	Karl Norman	Wangaratta Rovers	Carlton
7	80	Pass		St Kilda
7	81	Pass		Richmond
7	82	Pass		Fremantle
7	83	Pass		Sydney Swans
8	84	Mick Martyn	Kangaroos	Carlton
8	85	Pass		St Kilda
8	86	Pass		Richmond
8	87	Pass		Fremantle
9	88	Pass		St Kilda

== 2003 pre-season draft ==
Pick	Player	Recruited from	Club
1	Stephen Powell	Melbourne	St Kilda
2	Pass		Richmond
3	Craig Bolton	Brisbane Lions	Sydney Swans
4	Brent Moloney	Geelong Falcons	Geelong
5	Guy Rigoni	Melbourne	Melbourne
6	Pass		Adelaide Crows
7	Luke Mullins	Murray Bushrangers	Collingwood

== 2003 rookie draft ==
Round	Pick	Player	Recruited from	Club
1	1	Jonathon McCormick	Murray Kangaroos	Carlton
1	2	Allan Murray	Port Adelaide	St Kilda
1	3	Kelvin Moore	Yarra Valley Old Boys	Richmond
1	4	Ricky Mott	Sydney	Fremantle
1	5	Pass		Western Bulldogs
1	6	Heath James	Sydney	Sydney Swans
1	7	Brad Sewell	North Ballarat U/18	Hawthorn
1	8	Jeffrey Smith	East Perth	Geelong
1	9	Aaron Edwards	Dandenong U/18	West Coast Eagles
1	10	Michael Firrito	Box Hill	Kangaroos
1	11	Adam Fisher	North Ballarat U/18	Melbourne
1	12	Ben Haynes	Richmond	Essendon
1	13	Hayden Skipworth	Adelaide	Adelaide
1	14	Joel Patfull	Norwood	Port Adelaide
1	15	Nick Maxwell	North Ballarat	Collingwood
1	16	Daniel Pratt	North Melbourne	Brisbane Lions
2	17	Laurence Angwin	Box Hill	Carlton
2	18	Jordan Barham	Port Adelaide	St Kilda
2	19	Matthew Shir	Adelaide	Richmond
2	20	Ben Colreavy	Claremont (WA)	Fremantle
2	21	Pass		Western Bulldogs
2	22	Pass		Sydney Swans
2	23	Michael Osborne	Hawthorn	Hawthorn
2	24	Travis Jorgensen	Calder U/18	Geelong
2	25	Mark Nicoski	Subiaco	West Coast Eagles
2	26	Jeremy Clayton	North Ballarat	Kangaroos
2	27	Dale Carson	Western U/18	Melbourne
2	28	Courtney Johns	East Fremantle	Essendon
2	29	Jason Porplyzia	West Adelaide	Adelaide
2	30	Scott Borlace	Norwood	Port Adelaide
2	31	Jason Roe	City Cobras	Collingwood
2	32	Kevin Tandogac	Southport	Brisbane Lions
3	33	Mark McKenzie	Port Adelaide	Carlton
3	34	Pass		St Kilda
3	35	Adam Pickering	Carlton	Richmond
3	36	Daniel Gilmore	South Fremantle	Fremantle
3	37	Pass		Western Bulldogs
3	38	Pass		Sydney Swans
3	39	Tim Hazell	Hawthorn	Hawthorn
3	40	Shannon Byrnes	Murray U/18	Geelong
3	41	Zach Beeck	East Perth	West Coast Eagles
3	42	Clinton Alleway	Box Hill	Kangaroos
3	43	Ezra Poyas	Richmond	Melbourne
3	44	Adrian Wilson	Central District	Essendon
3	45	Aidan Parker	Subiaco	Adelaide
3	46	Pass		Port Adelaide
3	47	Tom Hooker	Oakleigh U/18	Collingwood
3	48	Pass		Brisbane Lions
4	49	Tom Hedge	Mitcham	Carlton
4	50	Pass		Richmond
4	51	Steven Dodd	East Fremantle	Fremantle
4	52	Pass		Western Bulldogs
4	53	Pass		Sydney Swans
4	54	George Davies	Sturt	Hawthorn
4	55	Nick Gill	Port Melbourne	Kangaroos
4	56	Nathan Carroll	Claremont (WA)	Melbourne
4	57	Toby McGrath	South Fremantle	Essendon
4	58	Michael Bratton	Norwood	Adelaide
4	59	Pass		Port Adelaide
4	60	Steven Eichner	Port Adelaide	Collingwood
4	61	Pass		Brisbane Lions
5	62	Michael Stinear	Dandenong U/18	Carlton
5	63	Pass		Richmond
5	64	Paul Bevan	NSW-ACT U/18	Sydney Swans
5	65	Michael Clark	Melbourne	Melbourne
5	66	Pass		Port Adelaide
5	67	Pass		Brisbane Lions
6	68	Sean O'Keeffe	Carlton	Carlton
6	69	Ryan Crawford	Calder U/18	Sydney Swans
6	70	Joel Macdonald	Mt Gravatt	Brisbane Lions
7	71	James Meiklejohn	NSW-ACT U/18	Sydney Swans
7	72	Paul Shelton	Morningside	Brisbane Lions
8	73	Declan O'Mahony	Ballyboden St Enda's GAA, Ireland	Sydney Swans
8	74	Luke Weller	Brisbane	Brisbane Lions

== Rookie elevation ==
This list details 2002-listed rookies who were elevated to the senior list; it does not list players taken as rookies in the rookie draft which occurred during the 2002/03 off-season.

Player	Recruited from	Club
John Baird	Box Hill	Kangaroos
Nathan Bock	Woodville-West Torrens	Adelaide Crows
Paul Chambers	Western Jets	Geelong
Roger Hayden	South Fremantle	Fremantle
Mark Jamar	North Adelaide	Melbourne
Quinten Lynch	West Perth	West Coast Eagles
Adam Matthews	Murray Bushrangers	Carlton
Martin Mattner	Sturt	Adelaide Crows
Digby Morrell	West Perth	Kangaroos
Jarad Rooke	Casterton	Geelong
Ben Rutten	West Adelaide	Adelaide Crows
Aaron Sandilands	East Fremantle	Fremantle
Andrew Siegert	Geelong Falcons	Fremantle
Bret Thornton	Oakleigh Chargers	Carlton

== See also ==
- Official AFL draft page
