= List of AFL debuts in 2003 =

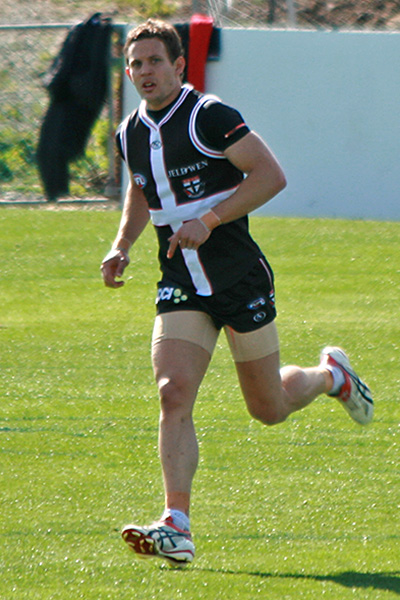
Luke Ball made his AFL debut in 2003.

This is a listing of Australian rules footballers who made their senior debut for an Australian Football League (AFL) club in 2003.

== Debuts ==
Name	Club	Age at debut	Round debuted	Games	Goals	Notes
Ben Rutten	Adelaide	20 years, 53 days	16	148	6	
Jason Torney	Adelaide	25 years, 287 days	1	77	18	Previously played for Richmond
Trent Hentschel	Adelaide	20 years, 109 days	3	71	94	
Wayne Carey	Adelaide	31 years, 307 days	1	28	56	Previously played for North Melbourne.
James Begley	Adelaide	22 years, 299 days	8	25	3	Previously played for St Kilda.
Ronnie Burns	Adelaide	30 years, 38 days	4	20	23	Previously played for Geelong.
Jacob Schuback	Adelaide	19 years, 260 days	20	7	4	
Jared Brennan	Brisbane Lions	18 years, 263 days	4	119	75	
Blake Caracella	Brisbane Lions	26 years, 14 days	1	34	33	Previously played for Essendon.
Luke Weller	Brisbane Lions	21 years, 153 days	12	4	1	
Jason Gram	Brisbane Lions	19 years, 62 days	13	2	0	
Jarrad Waite	Carlton	20 years, 53 days	1	132	153	
Kade Simpson	Carlton	19 years, 34 days	11	133	79	
Brad Fisher	Carlton	18 years, 360 days	2	99	127	
Barnaby French	Carlton	27 years, 124 days	1	71	20	Previously played for Port Adelaide.
Karl Norman	Carlton	19 years, 359 days	9	27	5	
Jonathon McCormick	Carlton	22 years, 3 days	1	26	5	
Mick Martyn	Carlton	34 years, 232 days	4	13	0	Previously played for North Melbourne. Son of Bryan Martyn.
Laurence Angwin	Carlton	20 years, 272 days	14	4	6	Grandson of Andy Angwin.
Dane Swan	Collingwood	19 years, 123 days	13	151	101	
Shane Woewodin	Collingwood	26 years, 259 days	1	62	31	Previously played for Melbourne. 2000 Brownlow Medallist.
Matthew Lokan	Collingwood	20 years, 128 days	1	46	20	
Andrew Williams	Collingwood	24 years, 27 days	1	46	20	Previously played for West Coast.
Tristen Walker	Collingwood	18 years, 351 days	1	28	8	
Adam McPhee	Essendon	20 years, 174 days	1	142	83	Previously played for Fremantle.
Jobe Watson	Essendon	18 years, 139 days	13	115	44	Son of Tim Watson. Captain of Essendon.
Jason Winderlich	Essendon	18 years, 212 days	7	94	40	
Damian Cupido	Essendon	21 years, 18 days	1	40	50	Previously played for Brisbane.
Ben Haynes	Essendon	22 years, 36 days	18	21	11	Previously played for Richmond.
Darren Walsh	Essendon	18 years, 113 days	4	2	0	
Aaron Sandilands	Fremantle	20 years, 114 days	1	156	60	
Byron Schammer	Fremantle	17 years, 282 days	1	127	38	
Des Headland	Fremantle	22 years, 68 days	1	114	125	Previously played for Brisbane.
Luke Webster	Fremantle	21 years, 41 days	14	33	11	
Henry Playfair	Geelong	20 years, 171 days	15	52	29	
Brent Moloney	Geelong	19 years, 159 days	14	23	6	
Matthew McCarthy	Geelong	21 years, 106 days	1	22	24	
Rick Ladson	Hawthorn	19 years, 74 days	1	102	38	
Peter Everitt	Hawthorn	28 years, 331 days	1	72	67	Previously played for St Kilda.
Ben Kane	Hawthorn	20 years, 28 days	4	23	1	
Kingsley Hunter	Hawthorn	28 years, 53 days	4	2	1	Previously played for Fremantle and the Western Bulldogs.
Jared Rivers	Melbourne	18 years, 294 days	19	108	4	Rising Star Award 2004.
Mark Jamar	Melbourne	19 years, 233 days	1	95	40	
Nathan Carroll	Melbourne	22 years, 181 days	4	71	1	Brother of Trent Carroll.
Ryan Ferguson	Melbourne	21 years, 182 days	1	47	6	
Chris Heffernan	Melbourne	24 years, 60 days	1	47	10	Previously played for Essendon.
Daniel Wells	Kangaroos	18 years, 54 days	1	149	85	
Michael Firrito	Kangaroos	19 years, 198 days	12	149	25	
David Hale	Kangaroos	18 years, 339 days	5	129	119	
Leigh Brown	Kangaroos	18 years, 17 days	5	118	64	Previously played for Fremantle.
Michael Stevens	Kangaroos	22 years, 234 days	13	44	16	Brother of Anthony Stevens. Previously played for Port Adelaide.
Jeremy Clayton	Kangaroos	22 years, 48 days	1	8	6	2005 Magarey Medallist. Brother of Shane Clayton.
Ashley Watson	Kangaroos	19 years, 52 days	8	7	1	
David Bourke	Kangaroos	27 years, 113 days	6	1	1	Son of Francis Bourke and grandson of Frank Bourke. Previously played for Richmond.
Toby Thurstans	Port Adelaide	22 years, 227 days	6	110	55	
Steven Salopek	Port Adelaide	17 years, 281 days	1	109	50	
Byron Pickett	Port Adelaide	25 years, 230 days	1	55	80	2004 Norm Smith Medallist. Previously played for North Melbourne.
Stuart Cochrane	Port Adelaide	24 years, 252 days	1	54	6	Previously played for North Melbourne.
Chris Hall	Port Adelaide	21 years, 40 days	3	2	0	
Kane Johnson	Richmond	25 years, 13 days	1	116	32	Previously played for Adelaide.
Jay Schulz	Richmond	18 years, 22 days	7	71	58	
Tim Fleming	Richmond	25 years, 8 days	3	34	10	
Justin Blumfield	Richmond	25 years, 124 days	1	19	5	Previously played for Essendon.
Bill Nicholls	Richmond	22 years, 128 days	7	10	2	Previously played for Hawthorn.
Marty McGrath	Richmond	19 years, 153 days	17	4	6	Cousin of Ashley, Toby and Cory McGrath
Brendon Goddard	St Kilda	17 years, 336 days	4	162	79	
Luke Ball	St Kilda	18 years, 308 days	4	142	58	Son of Ray Ball and brother of Matthew Ball.
Stephen Powell	St Kilda	26 years, 203 days	1	68	30	Previously played for Western Bulldogs and Melbourne.
Leigh Fisher	St Kilda	19 years, 106 days	18	55	5	
Luke Penny	St Kilda	22 years, 49 days	1	45	2	Previously played for the Western Bulldogs.
Allan Murray	St Kilda	21 years, 12 days	10	15	13	Previously played for Port Adelaide. Brother of Derek Murray.
Matthew Ferguson	St Kilda	18 years, 256 days	12	12	0	
Barry Brooks	St Kilda	19 years, 95 days	1	10	3	
Craig Bolton	Sydney	22 years, 302 days	1	170	15	Previously played for Brisbane.
Lewis Roberts-Thomson	Sydney	19 years, 252 days	8	133	14	
Adam Schneider	Sydney	18 years, 321 days	1	98	99	
Nick Davis	Sydney	22 years, 364 days	1	97	150	Son of Craig Davis. Previously played for Collingwood.
Mark Powell	Sydney	19 years, 49 days	6	8	0	
James Meiklejohn	Sydney	18 years, 301 days	5	6	0	
Adam Selwood	West Coast	19 years, 100 days	5	133	38	Brother of Troy, Joel and Scott Selwood.
Brent Staker	West Coast	19 years, 063 days	17	110	84	
Daniel Chick	West Coast	27 years, 061 days	3	103	51	Previously played for Hawthorn.
Damien Adkins	West Coast	22 years, 114 days	6	32	24	Previously played for Collingwood.
Paul Johnson	West Coast	18 years, 305 days	5	1	0	
Matthew Boyd	Footscray	20 years, 257 days	7	163	57	
Wayde Skipper	Footscray	20 years, 49 days	4	45	19	
Scott Bassett	Footscray	24 years, 172 days	1	15	1	Previously played for Port Adelaide.
Nicholas Bruton	Footscray	21 years, 281 days	9	2	0	
