= List of AFL debuts in 2004 =

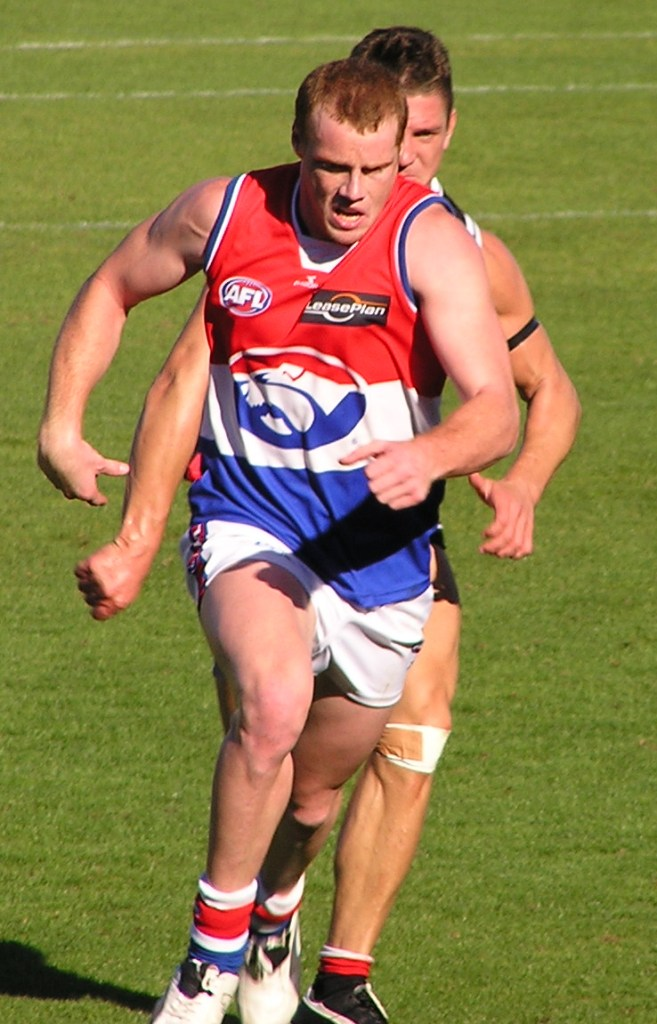
Adam Cooney made his AFL debut in 2004.

This is a listing of Australian rules footballers who made their senior debut for an Australian Football League (AFL) club during the 2004 AFL season.

== Debuts ==
Name	Club	Age at debut	Round debuted	Games (to end of 2014)	Goals (to end of 2014)	Notes
Nathan Bock	Adelaide	21 years, 34 days	5	113	57	
Ben Hudson	Adelaide	25 years, 47 days	3	55	6	
Luke Jericho	Adelaide	19 years, 182 days	4	33	31	
Scott Stevens	Adelaide	22 years, 79 days	2	119	71	Previously played for Sydney.
Fergus Watts	Adelaide	18 years, 273 days	13	5	2	
Jed Adcock	Brisbane Lions	18 years, 80 days	7	185	42	AFL Rising Star nomination (Rd 12, 2005)
Anthony Corrie	Brisbane Lions	19 years, 300 days	4	53	48	AFL Rising Star nomination (Rd 17, 2005)
Joel Macdonald	Brisbane Lions	19 years, 233 days	10	80	6	
Daniel Pratt	Brisbane Lions	21 years, 62 days	4	3	1	
Michael Rischitelli	Brisbane Lions	18 years, 198 days	17	111	47	
Jordan Bannister	Carlton	23 years, 148 days	1	53	17	Previously played for Essendon.
Adam Bentick	Carlton	19 years, 48 days	18	68	13	AFL Rising Star nomination (Rd 20, 2005)
Glen Bowyer	Carlton	24 years, 118 days	2	20	0	Previously played for Hawthorn.
Andrew Carrazzo	Carlton	20 years, 250 days	21	178	47	
David Clarke	Carlton	23 years, 317 days	1	12	2	Previously played for Geelong. Son of David Clarke and brother of Tim Clarke.
Adrian Deluca	Carlton	21 years, 317 days	1	46	22	Brother of Fabian Deluca.
Daniel Harford	Carlton	27 years, 8 days	1	9	2	Previously played for Hawthorn.
Brett Johnson	Carlton	22 years, 151 days	1	32	9	Previously played for Hawthorn.
Stephen Kenna	Carlton	22 years, 171 days	1	5	3	
Cory McGrath	Carlton	25 years, 122 days	11	50	4	Previously played for Essendon. Brother of Ashley and Toby McGrath.
Digby Morrell	Carlton	24 years, 169 days	1	32	12	Previously played for North Melbourne.
Ricky Mott	Carlton	23 years, 39 days	10	2	0	Previously played for Sydney.
Heath Scotland	Carlton	23 years, 250 days	1	215	69	Previously played for Collingwood.
Nick Stevens	Carlton	24 years, 98 days	3	104	61	Previously played for Port Adelaide.
David Teague	Carlton	22 years, 327 days	1	50	2	Previously played for North Melbourne.
Andrew Walker	Carlton	17 years, 342 days	5	179	118	AFL Rising Star nomination (Rd 5, 2004)
Cameron Cloke	Collingwood	19 years, 127 days	5	21	11	Son of David Cloke. Brother of Jason Cloke and Travis Cloke.
Justin Crow	Collingwood	21 years, 21 days	19	1	0	
Tom Davidson	Collingwood	21 years, 60 days	2	1	0	Son of Garry Davidson.
David King	Collingwood	19 years, 76 days	4	9	8	
Nick Maxwell	Collingwood	20 years, 353 days	9	208	29	
Luke Mullins	Collingwood	19 years, 116 days	4	3	0	
Bo Nixon	Collingwood	19 years, 253 days	2	3	0	
Guy Richards	Collingwood	21 years, 13 days	2	39	3	AFL Rising Star nomination (Rd 9, 2004)
Julian Rowe	Collingwood	19 years, 39 days	14	26	8	
Luke Shackleton	Collingwood	19 years, 257 days	18	1	0	
Mark Alvey	Essendon	23 years, 298 days	2	14	3	Previously played for the Western Bulldogs
Kepler Bradley	Essendon	18 years, 136 days	1	49	14	AFL Rising Star nomination (Rd 1, 2005)
Ricky Dyson	Essendon	18 years, 195 days	3	114	43	
Jason Laycock	Essendon	19 years, 277 days	19	58	36	AFL Rising Star nomination (Rd 5, 2005)
Nathan Lovett-Murray	Essendon	21 years, 131 days	1	145	73	
Justin Murphy	Essendon	27 years, 339 days	1	40	38	Previously played for Richmond, Geelong and Carlton.
Brent Stanton	Essendon	17 years, 332 days	1	226	147	AFL Rising Star nomination (Rd 20, 2004)
Steven Dodd	Fremantle	21 years, 55 days	20	101	7	
Ryley Dunn	Fremantle	18 years, 172 days	1	8	0	
Daniel Gilmore	Fremantle	21 years, 25 days	1	43	9	
Ryan Murphy	Fremantle	19 years, 54 days	16	48	50	
Dylan Smith	Fremantle	22 years, 13 days	18	10	3	Previously played for North Melbourne.
Shannon Byrnes	Geelong	20 years, 102 days	20	108	100	AFL Rising Star nomination (Rd 2, 2005)
David Haynes	Geelong	22 years, 291 days	1	19	15	Previously played for West Coast.
Paul Koulouriotis	Geelong	22 years, 155 days	17	18	4	Previously played for Port Adelaide.
David Loats	Geelong	23 years, 121 days	12	1	0	Previously played for Hawthorn.
Andrew Mackie	Geelong	19 years, 247 days	3	220	90	AFL Rising Star nomination (Rd 8, 2004)
Kane Tenace	Geelong	18 years, 275 days	2	59	12	AFL Rising Star nomination (Rd 6, 2004)
Matthew Ball	Hawthorn	22 years, 57 days	4	17	2	Son of Ray Ball and brother of Luke Ball.
Simon Beaumont	Hawthorn	28 years, 105 days	1	27	12	Previously played for Carlton.
Luke Brennan	Hawthorn	19 years, 100 days	12	19	11	
Danny Jacobs	Hawthorn	23 years, 276 days	1	45	6	Previously played for Essendon.
Daniel Bell	Melbourne	19 years, 89 days	15	66	1	
Aaron Davey	Melbourne	20 years, 291 days	1	178	174	AFL Rising Star nomination (Rd 1, 2004), Brother of Alwyn Davey.
Brock McLean	Melbourne	18 years, 87 days	11	94	39	AFL Rising Star nomination (Rd 3, 2005)
Phillip Read	Melbourne	24 years, 165 days	2	34	8	Previously played for West Coast.
Colin Sylvia	Melbourne	18 years, 196 days	9	157	129	AFL Rising Star nomination (Rd 9, 2005)
Blake Grima	Kangaroos	19 years, 315 days	4	15	3	
Chad Jones	Kangaroos	19 years, 321 days	6	6	1	Brother of Brett Jones.
Eddie Sansbury	Kangaroos	20 years, 123 days	1	40	21	
Callum Urch	Kangaroos	20 years, 17 days	19	8	1	
Troy Chaplin	Port Adelaide	18 years, 54 days	4	140	10	AFL Rising Star nomination (Rd 16, 2006)
Brett Ebert	Port Adelaide	20 years, 137 days	2	166	240	AFL Rising Star nomination (Rd 11, 2004), Son of Russell Ebert, cousin of Brad Ebert.
Josh Mahoney	Port Adelaide	26 years, 169 days	4	67	77	Previously played for Collingwood and the Western Bulldogs, member of Port's 2004 AFL Premiership winning team
Michael Pettigrew	Port Adelaide	19 years, 12 days	1	103	25	
Jacob Surjan	Port Adelaide	18 years, 226 days	1	121	17	AFL Rising Star nomination (Rd 11, 2006)
Brad Symes	Port Adelaide	19 years, 70 days	8	20	2	AFL Rising Star nomination (Rd 9, 2006)
Damon White	Port Adelaide	20 years, 274 days	8	55	47	
Simon Fletcher	Richmond	25 years, 257 days	6	6	0	Previously played for Carlton.
Brent Hartigan	Richmond	18 years, 354 days	1	35	3	AFL Rising Star nomination (Rd 22, 2004)
Ben Marsh	Richmond	27 years, 283 days	4	7	1	Previously played for Adelaide.
Kelvin Moore	Richmond	20 years, 72 days	11	87	12	
Shane Morrison	Richmond	23 years, 76 days	1	8	3	Previously played for Brisbane.
Andrew Raines	Richmond	18 years, 173 days	22	56	1	Son of Geoff Raines.
Tom Roach	Richmond	18 years, 228 days	4	11	1	Son of Michael Roach.
Shane Tuck	Richmond	22 years, 192 days	14	173	74	Son of Michael Tuck.
Luke Weller	Richmond	22 years, 101 days	5	7	3	Previously played for Brisbane.
Raphael Clarke	St Kilda	18 years, 303 days	17	85	9	AFL Rising Star nomination (Rd 22, 2005), Brother of Xavier Clarke.
Samuel Fisher	St Kilda	21 years, 303 days	7	198	22	
Jason Gram	St Kilda	20 years, 75 days	15	154	71	Previously played for Brisbane.
Brent Guerra	St Kilda	21 years, 324 days	4	31	44	Previously played for Port Adelaide.
Nick Stone	St Kilda	22 years, 311 days	19	3	0	Previously played for Hawthorn.
Paul Bevan	Sydney	23 years, 296 days	1	129	39	AFL Rising Star nomination (Rd 4, 2004)
Jarrad McVeigh	Sydney	18 years, 355 days	1	244	172	Brother of Mark McVeigh.
Aaron Rogers	Sydney	20 years, 117 days	6	2	0	
Josh Thewlis	Sydney	19 years, 342 days	13	2	0	
Zach Beeck	West Coast	22 years, 25 days	17	1	0	
Sam Butler	West Coast	18 years, 136 days	10	120	14	AFL Rising Star nomination (Rd 17, 2004)
Ashley Hansen	West Coast	21 years, 93 days	11	78	95	
Brett Jones	West Coast	21 years, 277 days	7	102	6	Brother of Chad Jones.
Mark Nicoski	West Coast	20 years, 152 days	5	112	61	
Mark Seaby	West Coast	19 years, 352 days	4	102	64	AFL Rising Star nomination (Rd 15, 2004)
Beau Waters	West Coast	18 years, 11 days	3	120	25	AFL Rising Star nomination (Rd 18, 2004)
Adam Cooney	Footscray	18 years, 180 days	1	219	186	AFL Rising Star nomination (Rd 21, 2004), #1 Draft pick (2003), Brownlow Medallist (2008).
Cameron Faulkner	Footscray	19 years, 345 days	6	18	9	
Steven Koops	Footscray	25 years, 248 days	1	11	0	Previously played for Fremantle.
Will Minson	Footscray	19 years, 42 days	9	179	77	AFL Rising Star nomination (Rd 7, 2005)
Adam Morgan	Footscray	22 years, 152 days	1	14	6	Previously played for Port Adelaide.
Brad Murphy	Footscray	19 years, 292 days	20	7	6	
Jade Rawlings	Footscray	26 years, 171 days	1	29	32	Previously played for Hawthorn. Brother of Brady Rawlings.
Farren Ray	Footscray	18 years, 45 days	7	75	32	
Peter Street	Footscray	23 years, 296 days	1	61	13	Previously played for Geelong.
