= Dylan McLaren =

Australian rules footballer

Personal information
- Born: 8 May 1982 (age 44)
- Original team: Sale / Gippsland Power
- Debut: Round 20, 19 August 2001, Brisbane Lions vs. Fremantle, at Subiaco
- Height: 194 cm (6 ft 4 in)
- Weight: 98 kg (216 lb)

Playing career^{1}
| Years | Club | Games (Goals) |
| 2001–2005 | Brisbane Lions | 46 (6) |
| 2006 | Carlton | 13 (4) |
| Total | | 59 (10) |
- ^{1} Playing statistics correct to the end of 2006.

Career highlights
- AFLQ premiership player: 2001

Dylan McLaren (born 8 May 1982) is a former Australian rules footballer in the Australian Football League.

He was recruited as the number 9 draft pick in the 2001 Preseason draft from Sale. He made his AFL debut for the Brisbane Lions in Round 20, 2001 against Fremantle. He played for Brisbane's reserves team in the winning 2001 AFLQ State League Grand Final.

Dylan struggled to have any major impact on his games until 2004, when he was a consistent player in the Lions' final 22. Dylan was delisted, and picked up by the Carlton Football Club with the first pick in the pre-season draft, at the end of the 2005 season, with the intention that he would fill the back-up ruck position behind Barnaby French. He made his debut for Carlton in the first round, and played thirteen of the fourteen rounds before being dropped in favour of Adrian Deluca and Chris Bryan. He played for Carlton's VFL-affiliate, the Northern Bullants, for the remainder of the season, rotating through the ruck and forward line to kick fifteen goals. He was expected to take the top ruck position at Carlton in 2007 but failed to play a senior game. McLaren was delisted from the Carlton playing list on Thursday, 6 September 2007.

Dylan McLaren signed with Port Melbourne in the VFL in 2008, and played there for three years, retiring from the VFL at the end of 2010. He finished his playing career with his junior club, Sale, in the Gippsland Football League, also continuing on there in a coaching capacity following his retirement.
