= Andrew Hill (footballer) =

Australian rules footballer

Personal information
- Full name: Andrew Hill
- Born: 11 June 1980 (age 46)
- Original teams: Tassie Mariners / Northern Bullants
- Height: 191 cm (6 ft 3 in)
- Weight: 92 kg (203 lb)

Playing career^{1}
Years	Club	Games (Goals)
2001	Collingwood	1 (0)
- ^{1} Playing statistics correct to the end of 2001.

Andrew Hill (born 11 June 1980) is a former Australian rules footballer who played with Collingwood in the Australian Football League (AFL).

Hill, a Tasmanian, played for the Mariners in the TAC Cup. He wasn't selected in the 1998 national draft and in 1999 played with the Burnie Dockers in the Tasmanian Football League during which he represented Tasmania versus the Western Australian Football League (WAFL) in Kalgoorlie, Western Australia. In the year 2000 he moved to the then stand alone Northern Bullants in the Victorian Football League (VFL) and impressed enough in his outings that he was signed by Collingwood for the 2001 and 2002 seasons before being delisted due to injury at the end of 2002. He played his first and only AFL game in Round 15 of 2001 at the Melbourne Cricket Ground against the Brisbane Lions and had seven disposals. During the 2003 season he played with the North Launceston Football Club in the Northern Tasmanian Football League. He then played at the Norwood Football Club in the South Australian National Football League (SANFL) from 2004 to 2007 before retiring due to injury.
