= Cameron Hunter =

Cameron Hunter may refer to:

- Cameron Hunter (footballer)
- Cameron Hunter (musician)
