= Justin Plapp =

Australian rules footballer (born 1977)

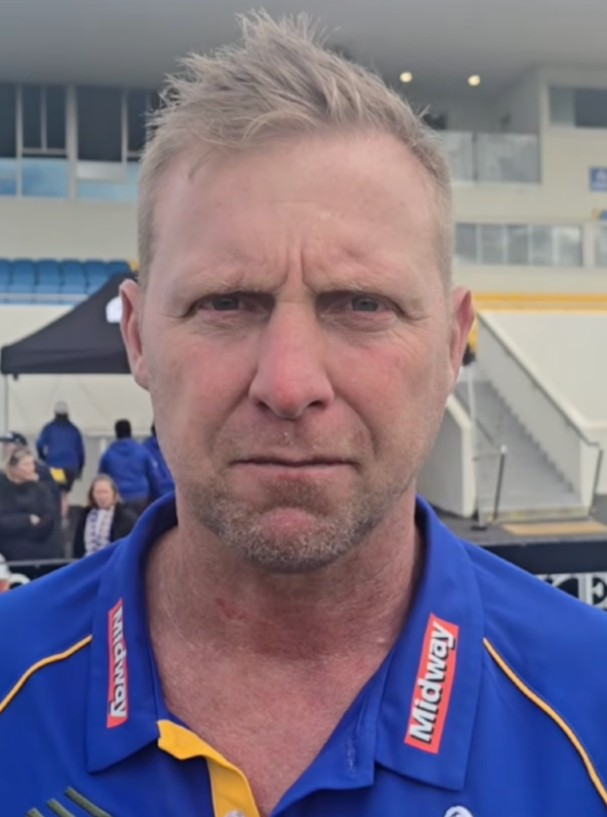
- Plapp with Williamstown in 2026

Personal information
- Full name: Justin Plapp
- Born: 22 June 1977 (age 49); Penguin, Tasmania
- Original team: Tassie Mariners
- Height: 189 cm (6 ft 2 in)
- Weight: 83 kg (183 lb)
- Position: Full-forward

Playing career^{1}
Years	Club	Games (Goals)
1998–1999	Richmond	18 (22)
2000–2002	St Kilda	26 (8)
Total		44 (30)
- ^{1} Playing statistics correct to the end of 2002.

Career highlights
- AFL Rising Star nominee: 1998

Justin Plapp (born 22 June 1977) is a former Australian rules footballer who played for the Richmond Football Club and St Kilda Football Club in the Australian Football League (AFL).

== Career ==
Plapp was born in Penguin, Tasmania and attended Penguin High School.

Plapp caught the attention of AFL clubs after kicking 98 goals with the Burnie Dockers in 1996, which was the most by a player in the TFL Statewide League that year. He was recruited by Richmond in the draft, and played in Richmond's reserves premiership in 1997. He started his senior AFL career in 1998 with two good performances at the Melbourne Cricket Ground, three goals on debut against Fremantle and five more in a win over Carlton the following weekend. His five-goal haul in the second game earned him an AFL Rising Star nomination.

In the 1999 AFL draft, Plapp was traded to St Kilda for pick 39, Scott Homewood. He was used at St Kilda as a half back flanker in his three seasons.

He was appointed captain-coach of the Burnie Dockers in 2008 and continued on into the first season of the revamped Tasmanian State League competition in 2009.

After leading his Burnie team to second position after the roster season, the Dockers were to crash out in straights sets in the finals.

Plapp's final match as a player saw missed set shot at goal after the final siren in the 2009 Preliminary Final which saw the Dockers lose to eventual premier Clarence by 4 points.

Plapp quit his post soon after due to a dispute with the Burnie board of directors and returned to Victoria. He took on assistant coaching roles in the Victorian Football League at Box Hill in 2010, and at Williamstown in 2011, before taking the senior coaching job at the Sandringham Dragons in the TAC Cup under 18s competition from 2012 until 2014. He became the senior coach of the Casey Scorpions in the VFL in 2015. Afterwards, Plapp returned home to Penguin and played for the Penguin Two Blues in the North West Football League.
