= Andrew Lee (Australian footballer) =

Australian rules footballer

Personal information
- Born: 1 July 1986 (age 40); Brighton, Tasmania
- Original team: Burnie Dockers/Tassie Mariners/Tasmanian Devils
- Debut: Round 13, 30 June 2006, Essendon vs. Kangaroos, at Telstra Dome

Playing career^{1}
Years	Club	Games (Goals)
2005–2008	Essendon	5 (2)
- ^{1} Playing statistics correct to the end of 2006.

Andrew Dwayne Lee (born 1 July 1986) is an Australian rules footballer who played with the Essendon Football Club in the Australian Football League (AFL). He was drafted from the Burnie Dockers, via the Tassie Mariners U18s and the Tasmanian Devils, with selection 30 in the 2004 Draft.

Lee was captain of the Tassie Mariners U18 side in 2003 and 2004, and was ranked in the top 5 for the agility test at draft camp, which was an impressive effort for a taller, more solidly-built player.

Lee's debut year at Essendon was marred by a serious case of osteitis pubis. He was the only senior-listed player at Essendon to fail to play a senior game in 2005. The faith the club invested in him was evident in the granting of the prized number 32 jumper, previously worn by club champions Barry Davis and Tim Watson. He made his debut in 2006 and played five games, but his 2008 season was affected by a shoulder injury he sustained playing in the Victorian Football League (VFL).

Lee was delisted by the club at the end of the 2008 season, after only playing 5 games for the club.
