= Jervis Stokes =

Australian rules footballer (1927–2016)

Personal information
- Full name: Jervis Arthur Stokes
- Born: 21 September 1927
- Died: 30 April 2016 (aged 88)
- Original team: Burnie
- Height: 180 cm (5 ft 11 in)
- Weight: 78 kg (172 lb)

Playing career^{1}
Years	Club	Games (Goals)
1948–50	Richmond	33 (32)
- ^{1} Playing statistics correct to the end of 1964.

Jervis Arthur Stokes (21 September 1927 – 30 April 2016) was an Australian rules footballer who played with Richmond in the Victorian Football League (VFL).

== Early career ==
Stokes, a centreman and half forward, played originally for Burnie. He represented Tasmania at the 1947 Hobart Carnival.

== Richmond ==
In 1948, Stokes joined the Richmond Football Club, where his brother Ray played. It was his injured brother's spot that Jervis took to make his league debut in round seven, against Hawthorn. He made a total of 11 appearances that year, then eight in the 1949 VFL season, followed by 14 in 1950.

== Post VFL career ==
Stokes went to Moorabbin as captain-coach in 1951, for the club's inaugural season in the Victorian Football Association (VFA). Moorabbin won only three of their 20 games in 1951, finishing only higher on the ladder than the other new club Box Hill.

From 1952 to 1954, Stokes was playing coach of Northern Tasmanian Football Association (NTFA) club Scottsdale.

In his first season, Stokes guided Scottsdale to the grand final, which they lost to City by 20 points. It was the first time Scottsdale had made an NTFA grand final.

He coached Moe to a premiership in the 1956 Latrobe Valley Football League season, just two years after the club had finished a season winless.

After four years with Moe, Stokes coached Trafalgar, but later returned to Tasmania and in 1964 was non playing coach of Devonport.

== Links ==
- Jervis Stokes Profile at Tigerland Archive
