= Josh Thewlis =

Josh Thewlis may refer to:

- Josh Thewlis (Australian footballer)
- Josh Thewlis (rugby league)
