= Marcus Picken =

Australian rules footballer

Personal information
- Full name: Marcus Picken
- Born: 9 October 1979 (age 47)
- Original teams: Macarthur, North Ballarat Rebels
- Draft: 58th, 1997 AFL draft
- Height: 186 cm (6 ft 1 in)
- Weight: 86 kg (190 lb)

Playing career^{1}
Years	Club	Games (Goals)
1998–2001	Brisbane Lions	25 (9)
2002–2003	Western Bulldogs	0 (0)
- ^{1} Playing statistics correct to the end of 2003.

Career highlights
- AFLQ premiership player: 2001

Marcus Picken (born 9 October 1979) is a former Australian rules footballer who played with the Brisbane Lions in the Australian Football League (AFL).

Picken is the son of former Collingwood star Billy Picken, older brother of former Western Bulldogs player Liam Picken, and cousin of former teammate and Brisbane Lions captain Jonathan Brown.

Recruited from the North Ballarat Rebels, he made his debut in 1998 after being selected by Brisbane in the 1997 AFL draft but was unable to make an impact in his limited opportunities. Picken played in eight of the first nine rounds of the 2001 AFL season before suffering a stress fracture in his foot which cost him a chance at an AFL premiership. However, he still played for Brisbane's reserves team in the winning 2001 AFLQ State League Grand Final.

Picken was traded in the 2001 draft, together with Shannon Rusca, to the Western Bulldogs in return for draft pick 49. He played some Wizard Cup games but despite being an emergency on one occasion was never able to make it into the seniors during the AFL season. However, his brother Liam would later play for the club.
