= Matthew Lokan =

Australian rules footballer, born 1982

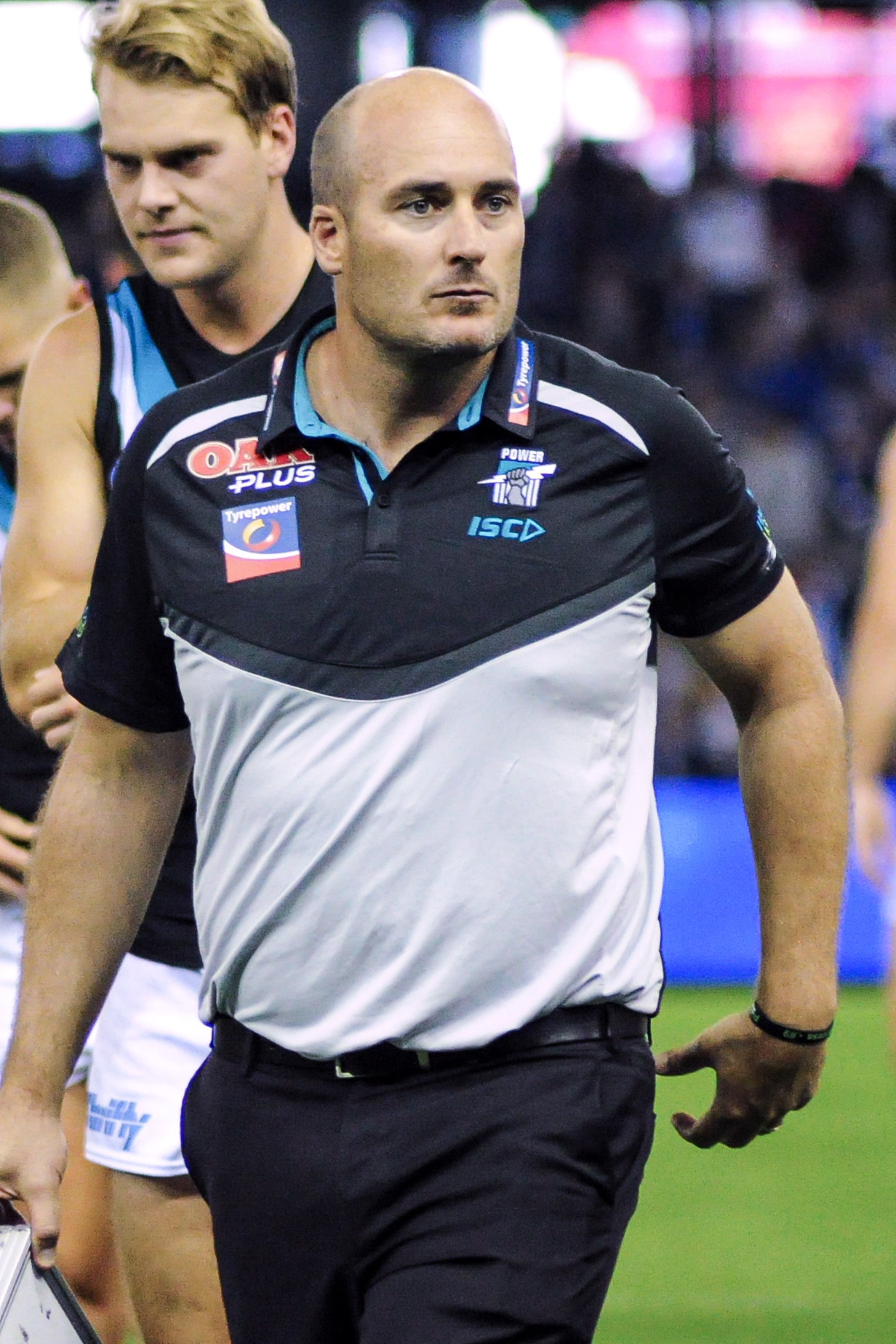
- Lokan in April 2018

Personal information
- Born: 20 November 1982 (age 43); South Australia
- Original team: Port Adelaide (SANFL)
- Positions: Forward pocket, half-back flank

Playing career^{1}
Years	Club	Games (Goals)
2003–2005	Collingwood	46 (20)
- ^{1} Playing statistics correct to the end of 2005.

Career highlights
- 2003 AFL Rising Star nominee; Harry Collier Trophy 2003

Matthew Lokan (born 20 November 1982) is a former professional Australian rules footballer who played for the Collingwood Football Club in the Australian Football League (AFL).

== Football career ==
Lokan started his career playing as a forward pocket for the Port Adelaide Magpies in the South Australian National Football League's (SANFL). He was the club's leading goalkicker for the 2002 season. He was drafted by Collingwood at the age of 20 in the 2002 AFL draft with pick 70.

Collingwood moved Lokan to a half-back flank and he made his senior AFL debut in round 1, 2003, playing all matches that season, including the Grand Final against Brisbane. In 2004 he played every game up until round 13 before being omitted. He came back for five more games that year before once again being omitted. In 2005 he played only three games before being delisted at the end of the year. In 2006 Lokan returned to play for the Port Adelaide Magpies in the SANFL senior competition, and later retired as a player. In total Lokan played 46 AFL matches over three seasons for Collingwood, and 114 SANFL matches with Port Adelaide.

== Coaching ==
In 2012, Lokan became the playing coach of the Belconnen Football Club in the North East Australian Football League (NEAFL). On 22 January 2015, Lokan was announced as the new coach of SANFL side Glenelg. On 13 November 2017, it was announced that Lokan would return to Port Adelaide as the head coach of the SANFL side. Lokan coached Port's SANFL side from 2018 to 2022, later moving into the club's assistant coaching panel, as well as working as a talent and development manager for St Michael's College in Adelaide and as recruiter in Collingwood's list management team in 2023.

Lokan was appointed senior coach of Collingwood's Victorian Football League (VFL) side ahead of the 2026 season.
