= Peter Morrison (Australian footballer) =

Australian rules footballer

Personal information
- Full name: Peter Morrison
- Born: 17 April 1956 (age 70)
- Original team: Sale (LVFL)
- Height: 180 cm (5 ft 11 in)
- Weight: 80 kg (176 lb)

Playing career^{1}
Years	Club	Games (Goals)
1974	Footscray	1 (0)
1976–1981	South Melbourne	90 (95)
Total		91 (95)
- ^{1} Playing statistics correct to the end of 1981.

Peter Morrison (born 17 April 1956) is a former Australian rules footballer who played with Footscray and South Melbourne in the Victorian Football League (VFL).

Morrison made just one appearance for Footscray, having been zoned to the club from Sale. At the end of the year he had a knee reconstruction and when he decided to sign with South Melbourne, Footscray received just a $500 as the transfer fee. He proved to be a bargain buy for South Melbourne and following a stop start year in 1976, became one of the club's leading players over the next four seasons.

He played 22 of a possible 23 games in 1976 and had a large part in South Melbourne's win over Geelong at Kardinia Park with 36 kicks and 11 marks. In 1978 he was the top disposal getter at South Melbourne and also kicked 27 goals. Morrison had another solid season in 1979 and the following year was the only South Melbourne player to average over 20 disposals a game. He also polled well in the 1980 Brownlow Medal count, with nine votes, to finish as the equal top vote getter at his club. A broken leg kept him out of action for most of 1981 and he played only the final round.

When South Melbourne relocated to Sydney in 1982, Morrison instead went to Queensland. He had resigned from South Melbourne over the bitter feud on relocation which had split the club during the pre-season. From 1982 to 1984 he captain-coached Queensland Australian Football League side Wilston Grange. Although he stepped away from his role of coach in 1985, he continued as a player and performed well enough to finish second in the Grogan Medal, to Zane Taylor. During the 1987 season he crossed to Mayne, firstly as a player and later as an assistant coach. While in Brisbane he was regularly selected for Queensland representative matches.

For much of the 1990s, Morrison coached in Cairns and he later returned to Gippsland, where he was appointed coach of Stratford for the 2010 and 2011 seasons.

His son, Shane Morrison, played for both the Brisbane Lions and Richmond.
