= Barry Brooks =

Australian rules footballer

Personal information
- Full name: Barry Brooks
- Nickname: The Cactus
- Born: 24 December 1983 (age 42); King Island, Tasmania
- Original team: Grassy/Tassie Mariners
- Draft: 15th overall, 2001 AFL draft
- Height: 198 cm (78 in)
- Weight: 95 kg (209 lb)
- Position: Ruck/Forward

Playing career^{1}
| Years | Club | Games (Goals) |
| 2002 | Port Adelaide | 0 (0) |
| 2003–2007 | St Kilda | 10 (3) |
- ^{1} Playing statistics correct to the end of 2007.

Barry Brooks (born 24 December 1983) is a former Australian rules footballer who played in the Australian Football League (AFL).

== Early career ==
Brooks was recruited as the number 15 draft pick in the 2001 AFL draft from Grassy. He failed to make his debut for Port Adelaide and was traded at the end of the 2002 season to St Kilda in exchange for picks 6 (Steven Salopek) and 31 (on-traded to North Melbourne as part of the deal to secure Byron Pickett; pick 31 was used by North to draft Joel Perry).

== St Kilda career ==
Brooks made his debut for the Saints in Round 1 of the 2003 season against North Melbourne and played five games for the year. After problems with injury he did not play a game in 2004 and only two in 2005. After another year with the Casey Scorpions and very little opportunities, Brooks was recalled to the St Kilda playing team in Round 22 against Brisbane at the Gabba after a 14-month absence from the senior team (in the last home and away game of the season). Brooks had the best game of his career until that point, kicking three goals and beating a strong presence up forward, also taking seven marks and finishing with 15 disposals.

Brooks was delisted by St Kilda at the end of the 2007 season, having played only two games for the season.
