= Ben Robbins =

Australian rules footballer (born 1976)

Personal information
- Full name: Benjamin Anthony Robbins
- Born: 27 December 1976 (age 49)
- Original team: Gippsland Power
- Draft: 33rd overall, 1993 AFL draft
- Height: 181 cm (5 ft 11 in)
- Weight: 77 kg (170 lb)

Playing career^{1}
Years	Club	Games (Goals)
1996	Brisbane Bears	5 (1)
1997–2001	Brisbane Lions	47 (13)
2002–2003	Kangaroos	40 (7)
Total		92 (21)
- ^{1} Playing statistics correct to the end of 2003.

Career highlights
- AFLQ premiership player: 2001; Joe Grant Medal: 2001

Benjamin Anthony Robbins (born 27 December 1976) is a former Australian rules footballer who played with the Brisbane Bears, the Brisbane Lions and North Melbourne in the Australian Football League (AFL).

Robbins, who was from Maffra, played in the TAC Cup for Gippsland Power before he was recruited by the West Coast Eagles with the 33rd pick of the 1993 AFL draft. The son of former Richmond player Graham Robbins, he chose to remain in Gippsland and it was not until 1995 that he made the move to Western Australia. Robbins was unable to break into the Eagles team and instead spent the season playing for Perth in the West Australian Football League (WAFL). As a result, he was traded at the end of the year to the Brisbane Bears, for pick 66 in the draft which was used on Neil Marshall.

After making his AFL debut in 1996, Robbins changed clubs again for the 1997 AFL season due to the merger between the Bears and Fitzroy. A midfielder, Robbins struggled to cement a spot in the Lions' team as they already had a strong combination in the middle. He made 11 appearances in 2001, Brisbane's premiership winning season, but did not participate in the finals. Robbins was then delisted and he nominated for the 2001 AFL draft, where he was picked up by the Kangaroos with the 54th selection. He played in all of the Victorian club's 23 games in 2002 and featured prominently again in 2003, however he spent the 2004 season in the Victorian Football League (VFL) with Port Melbourne.
