= 2000 AFL Rising Star =

Australian rules football award

2000 Ansett AFL Rising Star
- Sponsored by: Ansett
- Country: Australia
- Rising Star: Paul Hasleby (Fremantle)

The Ansett AFL Rising Star award is given annually to a stand out young player in the Australian Football League. The 2000 medal was won by Fremantle player Paul Hasleby.

== Eligibility ==
Every round, an Australian Football League rising star nomination is given to a stand out young player. To be eligible for the award, a player must be under 21 on January 1 of that year, have played 10 or fewer senior games and not been suspended during the season. At the end of the year, one of the 22 nominees is the winner of award.

== Nominations ==
Round	Player	Club
1	Paul Hasleby	Fremantle
2	David Spriggs	Geelong
3	Damien Adkins	Collingwood
4	Leigh Brown	Fremantle
5	Adam Ramanauskas	Essendon
6	Josh Fraser	Collingwood
7	Adam Lange	Kangaroos
8	Cameron Bruce	Melbourne
9	Jude Bolton	Sydney
10	Chad Cornes	Port Adelaide
11	Glen Bowyer	Hawthorn
12	Ian Perrie	Adelaide
13	Beau McDonald	Brisbane Lions
14	Andrew Embley	West Coast
15	Matthew Whelan	Melbourne
16	Brett Moyle	St Kilda
17	Matthew Pavlich	Fremantle
18	Matthew Scarlett	Geelong
19	Brad Green	Melbourne
20	Ryan Houlihan	Carlton
21	Chad Fletcher	West Coast
22	Josh Carr	Port Adelaide
Source: AFL Record Season Guide 2015

== Final voting ==
	Player	Club	Votes
1	Paul Hasleby	Fremantle	33
2	Adam Ramanauskas	Essendon	30
3	Beau McDonald	Brisbane Lions	13
4	Brad Green	Melbourne	12
5	Josh Fraser	Collingwood	7
6	Jude Bolton	Sydney	5
7	Matthew Pavlich	Fremantle	2
7	Matthew Whelan	Melbourne	2
9	Glen Bowyer	Hawthorn	1
Source: AFL Record Season Guide 2015
