= 2001 AFLQ State League season =

93rd season of the AFL Queensland State League

- Date: 24 April – 23 September 2001
- Premiers: Brisbane reserves 1st premiership
- Minor premiers: Southport
- Grogan Medallist: Paul O'Brien (Redland)

The 2001 AFLQ State League season was the 93rd season of the AFL Queensland State League (AFLQSL), the highest-level senior men's Australian rules football competition in Queensland. The season began on 24 April and concluded on 23 September.

Brisbane reserves won the premiership for the first time, defeating minor premiers Southport by 12 points in the 2001 AFLQ State League Grand Final. It was one of two premierships Brisbane won that year, with the club's senior side winning the 2001 AFL Grand Final the following week.

This would be the only time Brisbane would win an AFLQSL/QAFL premiership, and their only reserves-level premiership until the 2012 NEAFL Grand Final.

== Home-and-away season ==
Ten clubs – Brisbane, Broadbeach, Labrador, Mayne, Mount Gravatt, Morningside, Northern Eagles, Redland, Southport and Western Magpies – took part in the competition. Southport were the minor premiers.

== Finals series ==
=== Grand Final ===
2001 AFLQ State League Grand Final
Sunday, 23 September	Brisbane	def.	Southport	Giffin Park
2.1 (13); 5.4 (34); 11.14 (80); 13.20 (98)	Q1; Q2; Q3; Final	4.5 (29); 8.6 (54); 10.6 (66); 13.8 (86)	Joe Grant Medal: Ben Robbins (Brisbane)
3: Headland; 2: Mapleston, Kluver, Cupido, McLaren; 1: Van Rooyen, Picken	Goals	6: Pilcher; 2: Mackay; 1: Gehling, Watts, Devine, Coughlan, Bradley
Robbins, Headland, Shattock, McLaren, Bolton, Morrison, Hadley	Best	Pilcher, Lawton, Bradley, Crossley, Jenkins, Stephens
