= Ryan Houlihan =

Australian rules footballer, born 1982

Personal information
- Full name: Ryan Houlihan
- Nickname: (Houla) Hoops
- Born: 21 January 1982 (age 44); Wahgunyah, Victoria
- Original teams: Wahgunyah, Murray Bushrangers (TAC Cup)
- Draft: No. 73, 1999 National draft, Carlton
- Height: 187 cm (6 ft 2 in)
- Weight: 85 kg (187 lb)
- Position: Forward/ Defender/ Utility

Playing career^{1}
Years	Club	Games (Goals)
2000–2011	Carlton	201 (127)
- ^{1} Playing statistics correct to the end of 2011.

Career highlights
- 2000 AFL Rising Star nominee; 2× pre-season premiership player: 2005, 2007

Ryan Houlihan (born 21 January 1982) is a former Australian rules footballer who played 12 seasons and 201 games for the Carlton Football Club in the Australian Football League (AFL) from 2000 to 2011.

== Background ==
Ryan is the third of four brothers who were all drafted to AFL clubs: Damian Houlihan, Adam Houlihan and Josh Houlihan, from Wahgunyah on the Murray River, in northern Victoria. He has been by far the most successful of the four. An uncle, Paul O'Donoghue also played for North Melbourne in 1976. Prior to being recruited by Carlton, at pick No. 73 in the 1999 AFL draft, Houlihan played as a junior for Corowa-Rutherglen and for the Murray Bushrangers under 18 team. He was named All Australian Under 16 in 1998 and represented Australia in the 1999 youth series against Ireland. Houlihan was named in the Murray Bushrangers' best team of all time (1993–2012).

== 2000 ==
Houlihan made his debut for the Carlton around the middle of the 2000 season. The Carlton team of 2000 was a particularly strong one, with many great names such as Craig Bradley, Stephen Silvagni and Anthony Koutoufides and finished second at the end of the home and away season. Houlihan quickly had an impact for Carlton as a classy, skilful, running forward, with an uncanny ability to kick goals. For a skinny 18-year-old, pick No. 73, then weighing just 71 kg to break into that side and play every game from Round 17, including all three finals was an excellent accomplishment, exceeding expectations. Houlihan ended up played 13 games in his debut season and was nominated for the AFL Rising Star award after a 20 possession game in the Round 20 blockbuster against Essendon before over 90,000 people. Houlihan also received the Carlton Past Players Encouragement Award for his debut season.

== 2001 ==
Houlihan continued on from his impressive debut season with an even better year in 2001, continuing as a forward. He played 23 of 24 games (missing one with injury) and kicked 28 goals. He played an important part, kicking three goals, when an undermanned Carlton had a surprise victory over reigning premiers Essendon in Round 3 and again in the Round 20 win over St Kilda. He also had a number of two-goal games that year.

== 2002 ==
Houlihan is a highly skilled player and has been extremely versatile, able to play a variety of positions. Early in 2002, while continuing to play as a forward, an electrifying three goals in a quarter got Carlton back into the Round 8 match against Hawthorn. Toward the end of 2002, Houlihan began to play-off the half-back line, where his skill and run were used to set up forward thrusts. He played an important role off half back in the Round 21 victory against the Bulldogs, with 23 possessions and set up the winning goal.

== 2003 ==
A change of coach and an improved pre-season saw Houlihan bigger and stronger and he spoke of feeling more confident under Denis Pagan and wanting to win more contested ball. Houlihan played all 22 matches in 2003, the highlight being the Round 3 victory over Essendon, in which he would gather a then career best 28 possessions, kick two goals and receive the three Brownlow votes. His goal in the last quarter, in driving rain, from a tight angle in the forward pocket, which would seal the win and be celebrated by a 'Chainsaw' maneuver, would be a career highlight. He kicked three goals in the Round 5 victory over the Kangaroos. A versatile player, able to play a variety of positions, Houlihan was moved from the forward line to defence in mid-2003, where he was played as a running half back, who was able to set up forward thrusts with precise kicking. He would spend the next three seasons in that role. He finished 2003 off well with a team and new career high 31-possession effort and was one of the few players to stand up in the Round 22 thrashing by the Kangaroos. His improved consistency saw him finish in the top 10 in the Best and Fairest and in the top four for disposals and kicks for the first time. He remained in the top 10 for average disposals and kicks every year from 2003 to 2010. At the end of 2003 Houlihan received a lucrative offer to join Melbourne Football Club but stayed loyal to Carlton and continued to do so for the remainder of his AFL career.

== 2004 ==
Houlihan had another consistent year playing off halfback in 2004, managing 21 of 22 games (troubled by groin problems late in the season), again finishing in the top 10 in the Best and Fairest and in the top five for disposals, marks and kicks.

== 2005 ==
Houlihan played his 100th game in season 2005 and became the third youngest Carlton player ever to achieve that mark (after Robert Walls and Lance Whitnall). He continued to mostly play in defence but in the absence of regular midfielders Scott Camporeale and Heath Scotland, was brought into the midfield in the drawn game against Port Adelaide in Round 4. He shone in that game and was probably Carlton's best player, with 26 disposals and was able to set up a number of goals with precise kicking.

== 2006 ==
Houlihan worked very hard during the 2006 pre-season, becoming a lot bigger, stronger and fitter, so he could play in the midfield. He played all 22 games in 2006, improving to become second at the club for kicks and disposals, highlighted by a career best 35 disposals in Round 4. In the second half of the year Houlihan was given run with roles on some of the best players in the AFL, such as Jason Akermanis, who he kept to just 9 possessions, Darren Milburn to 2 kicks and Nathan Eagleton to 11 possessions. A vigorous bump which left West Coast Eagle Matt Rosa with concussion almost earned Houlihan his first and only suspension but it was deemed fair by the AFL tribunal. Overall, Houlihan increased his average possessions to 21 per game- statistically the best season of his career, ranking in the top few not only in uncontested possessions and handball-receives but also in hardball-gets and contested possessions, highlighting that he can win the ball as an inside or outside player.

== 2007 ==
In 2007 Houlihan played 21 of 22 games (missing one game with illness) and recorded his best ever finish in the club's Best and Fairest- fourth. He continued to perform run with roles in all parts of the ground on some of the AFL's best players, such as Gary Ablett Jr, James Hird, Alan Didak, who he kept to a season low 10 possessions, Andrew McLeod, who he kept to just 14 possessions, Aaron Davey to a season low 4 possessions, Tadhg Kennelly to 6 and Josh Drummond to 12. He also played some high possession, more offensive games, highlighted by a season best 33 possessions in Round 20 against Essendon and despite a number of defensive roles, still finished second at the club for kicks and third for possessions. Houlihan had not kicked a lot of goals since being moved to defence but kicked three skilful goals for the first time in a game since 2003 in Round 11 against Port Adelaide. During that year, at just 25 years of age, Houlihan already achieved his 150th game, becoming the third youngest Carlton player to reach that milestone, having been a regular member of Carlton teams since the age of 18 and to that point had rarely missed games due to injury.

== 2008 ==
Houlihan had however been battling a hip problem for four years, which worsened after playing the first three games of 2008 and required surgery. A long recovery and rehab kept him out until the final two matches, but he made a spectacular return, kicking three classy goals in his first game back.

== 2009 ==
Houlihan played 20 games in 2009, at both ends of the ground, as Carlton returned to the finals for the first time in eight years, although it only lasted one game. He kicked 13 goals for the year – his best since 2003 – equal sixth at the club. He averaged 20 disposals per game (around the same as his last full season, 2007) – eighth at the club. Houlihan showed a lot of improvement in the defensive side of his game. He improved his tackling numbers to a career-high 2.6 per game. He also improved his contested possessions and hardball-gets to career high levels, averaging 6 and 3 per game respectively and had as many as 14 contested possessions in the Round 16 game against Sydney. His best game of the year was probably the Elimination Final – in which he was judged second best player in Best and Fairest voting. He was one of just two players who had previously played in a final for Carlton the last time they made the finals in 2001 and took it upon himself to help prepare his younger teammates. He had 25 possessions (equal second highest), 10 of which were contested (equal highest), 5 clearances (second highest) and 3 tackles- one of which stopped a likely Brisbane goal. He scored an important early goal after smothering the ball, demonstrating the improved defensive side to his game to complement his well-known skill. Houlihan had a solid year in 2009, finishing 11th in the club's Best and Fairest, missing the top 10 by just one vote.

Houlihan was one of a number of Carlton players involved in off field incidents following Carlton players' 2009 Christmas party to be fined and suspended from pre-season training for a month. They were sent to a boxing gym and underwent a strenuous training program. This in fact had a positive effect and he applied himself so well that he achieved best ever levels of fitness and convinced the club he had the right attitude.

== 2010 ==
In 2010, following Brendan Fevola's departure, Houlihan became Carlton's longest serving player. He had a series of excellent performances playing as a defensive forward in 2010, in which he was given the task of negating the influence of the opposition's key running defender, while using his skills to kick and set up goals. These included Simon Goodwin, who he kept to a season low 4 kicks and 16 possessions, while kicking 3 goals; Corey Enright, who he kept to 16 possessions, while kicking 2 goals and Sam Fisher, who he restricted to just 6 possessions- a season low. He kicked a career high 4 goals in the Round 11 victory over Melbourne. Unfortunately hamstring and knee injuries restricted him to just 13 games and he did not play any matches after Round 15, eventually requiring season ending surgery to his knee, after an unsuccessful attempt to come back. He kicked 15 goals and just 4 behinds for the year- a little over a goal per game and No. 1 at the club for accuracy (of those who had kicked 10 goals or more), an indication of his elite finishing skills in front of goal (as described by Champion Data). As well as kicking goals directly, he was also second at the club for goal assists per game. He finished a creditable 12th in the Best and Fairest, despite having missed 10 games. He would have made the top 10 on average votes per game. His excellent early season form prior to the first of his injuries had seen him in third place after seven rounds and in the top 10 when his season ended prematurely. Since finishing fourth in the 2007 Best and Fairest he had two seasons significantly affected by injury and missed the top 10 by one vote in the other.

== 2011 ==
Houlihan continued to suffer significant injury problems. A severe calf injury during the pre-season, which recurred several times and took more than 3 months to recover from, kept him out until Round 13- an absence of over 11 months since his last game. He was only seen briefly at the end of the game as the substitute player (a new innovation introduced in 2011). The following week, in Round 14, he returned to his role as a defensive forward, limiting key West Coast Eagles playmaker Shannon Hurn to a near season low 10 possessions, while having 19 of his own and 2 goal assists. Houlihan played his 200th game in Round 19 against North Melbourne, the same side he had debuted against 11 years previously, becoming just the 31st player in the history of the Carlton Football Club to achieve that. President and club great Stephen Kernahan and Coach Brett Ratten said he had been a great player for the club and had anticipated that the emotion of his milestone would motivate the team to win the match for him, which it did.

== Retirement ==
After playing just one more senior game, Houlihan announced his retirement from AFL football at the end of the 2011 season- his 12th- to finish up with 201 games at 29 years of age. Injuries had caused him to miss 41 games. His time had come to step away, he stated. When asked "How would you like to be remembered?": "As a silky and skilful player who did his job for the team." He started his career when Carlton were enjoying success, became the longest serving player to play through its unsuccessful period of the 2000s and was still there as the club returned to success. Coach Brett Ratten praised him for his loyalty and commitment to the club for 11 years, throughout its dark period and said it had been an honour to coach him. He said he will be remembered for his poise under pressure and smooth skills. In a radio interview after announcing his retirement, Ryan was asked if he felt he had got the most from his talent. He said he believed he had. Houlihan was honoured by the AFL in the 2011 Grand Final pre-match with a lap of honour as a retiring 200 game player.

== Other facts ==
- A member of Carlton's Pre-Season Premiership teams in 2005 and 2007.
- The Carlton Football Club record holder for greatest number of games played in Guernsey No. 33, passing Peter McConville's previous record of 140 games in 2007, at just 25 years of age.
- Has played by far the most games of any AFL player to be picked at 73 in the draft.
- Was Top 10 at the club for average disposals and kicks every year from 2003– 2010.
- Houlihan has consistently been nominated by former teammate and Coleman medalist Brendan Fevola as the most skillful player he has ever played with and clearly the best deliverer of the ball in his ability to pinpoint a pass to a forward's advantage. Teammate, Brownlow medalist Chris Judd was willing to concede that.
- In 201 games and 12 seasons Houlihan was never suspended by the AFL Tribunal
- He was chosen in CARLTON’S GREATEST 150 PLAYERS, to celebrate the Blues' 150th anniversary in 2014

== Off the field ==
Houlihan regularly featured in calendars throughout his career, semi-naked, including the Men For All Seasons calendar in 2002, 2003 and 2004, as well as the Gods of Football calendar in 2009, voted one of the AFL's sexiest men, to help raise money for the McGrath Foundation, supporting breast cancer research and cancer awareness. He was also one of the featured footballers in Nova FM Radio Station's Naked footballers under the shower promotion in 2010.

== Post AFL ==
Houlihan was appointed coach of Greater Western Sydney Giants 'Academy' players for 2012 and also joined the Sydney Hills Eagles in their debut season in the North East Australian Football League Eastern Conference as a player and assistant coach. He also fulfilled a coaching role with the Under-16 and Under-18 NSW/ACT RAMS. Houlihan was named in the NEAFL Eastern Conference Team of the Year for 2012. Houlihan also played a once-off match for Waratah in the 2011/12 Northern Territory Football League season.

In 2013, Houlihan played for St Bernard's Old Collegians in the Victorian Amateur Football Association, and in 2014 he is playing for Deer Park in the Western Region Football League. Houlihan is now a part owner of Rustique Co. restaurant in Deer Park. He also participated in the EJ Whitten Legends Game in 2013 and 2014.

2015 Carlton Football Club Father-Son Academy

The academy will be coached by former Blue Ryan Houlihan who played 201 games for Carlton from 2000 to 2011. Houlihan has devised a structured program based on each child's age and in accordance with the AFL guidelines. The program will involve a combination of football clinics and one-on-one interaction.
