= Laurence Angwin =

Australian rules footballer, born 1982

Personal information
- Full name: Laurence Angwin
- Born: 7 October 1982 (age 44)
- Original team: Dandenong Stingrays
- Draft: 7th overall, 2000 AFL draft 17th overall, 2003 Rookie Draft
- Height: 200 cm (6 ft 7 in)
- Weight: 97 kg (214 lb)

Playing career^{1}
Years	Club	Games (Goals)
2001	Adelaide	0 (0)
2003–2004	Carlton	4 (6)
- ^{1} Playing statistics correct to the end of 2004.

Laurence Angwin (born 7 October 1982) is a former Australian rules footballer who played for the Carlton Football Club in the Australian Football League (AFL). He is infamous for being sacked by Carlton after turning up to training having used recreational drugs.

== AFL career ==
The grandson of former Hawthorn player Andy Angwin, Angwin was drafted by the Adelaide Football Club at pick 7 in the first round of the 2000 AFL draft. Angwin lasted only one season with Adelaide without playing a game at senior level. Battling injuries and emotional issues, he was delisted in 2001 and returned to Melbourne.

After playing for the Box Hill Hawks in 2002, Angwin was drafted by Carlton at pick 17 in the 2003 Rookie draft and he made his AFL debut in round 14, 2003. By the end of the 2003 season, Angwin was considered to be a future star at Carlton. However, continuing off-field problems, including charges being laid against him from stealing from teammate Karl Norman, meant he remained a controversial player.

Early in the 2004 season, after Carlton's round 2 win against Geelong, it was claimed that Angwin and Norman arrived at a Carlton training session under the influence of ecstasy. While Norman admitted to taking the drug, Angwin denied it but a subsequent drug test proved positive and Angwin was sacked by Carlton.

Angwin signed with the Wyndhamvale Football Club in the Western Region Football League's division two for the 2009 season. As of 2013, it was reported that Angwin was playing for Ouyen United, along with former AFL players Damian Cupido, Relton Roberts and Kane Munro, in the Mallee Football League.
