= Tom Cochrane (footballer) =

Australian rules footballer

Personal information
- Full name: Tom Cochrane
- Born: 27 January 2006 (age 20)
- Original team: Central District (SANFL)
- Draft: No. 13, 2025 Rookie draft
- Debut: Round 3, 2025, Port Adelaide vs. Essendon, at Adelaide Oval
- Height: 183 cm (6 ft 0 in)
- Position: Midfielder / Forward

Club information
- Current club: Port Adelaide
- Number: 26

Playing career^{1}
Years	Club	Games (Goals)
2025–	Port Adelaide	6 (4)
- ^{1} Playing statistics correct to the end of the 2026 season.

Tom Cochrane (born 27 January 2006) is an Australian rules footballer who plays for the Port Adelaide Football Club in the Australian Football League (AFL).

== Early life ==
Cochrane grew up with Tourette syndrome, having started having vocal tics at age of 9. He played junior football for Central District in the South Australian National Football League (SANFL). He performed strongly in the SANFL under-18s, and was selected by Port Adelaide with pick 13 in the 2025 AFL rookie draft. He joined the Power as a midfielder and forward.

== AFL career ==
He made his AFL debut in Round 3 of the 2025 season against Essendon at Adelaide Oval, becoming the first player with Tourette syndrome to play in the AFL.

== Personal life ==
He is the son of former AFL player Stuart Cochrane, who played for North Melbourne and Port Adelaide, and brother of his teammate Dougie, who was the first player selected in the 2026 AFL draft. However, Tom was not eligible for a father-son draft selection because his father did not meet the required number of games.

He is an Indigenous Australian descended from Ngunawal.

== Statistics ==
Updated to the end of round 22, 2026.

Legend
G	Goals	K	Kicks	D	Disposals	T	Tackles
B	Behinds	H	Handballs	M	Marks

Season	Team	No.	Games	Totals							Averages (per game)							Votes
Season	Team	No.	Games	G	B	K	H	D	M	T	G	B	K	H	D	M	T	Votes
2025	Port Adelaide	37	3	2	1	12	8	20	5	4	0.7	0.3	4.0	2.7	6.7	1.7	1.3	0
2026	Port Adelaide	26	3	2	3	17	5	22	6	7	0.7	1.0	5.7	1.7	7.3	2.0	2.3	0
Career			6	4	4	29	13	42	11	11	0.7	0.7	4.8	2.2	7.0	1.8	1.8	0
