= Ray Stokes =

Australian rules footballer

Personal information
- Born: 21 May 1924; Longford, Tasmania
- Died: 26 February 2017 (aged 92)
- Original team: Burnie
- Height: 180 cm (5 ft 11 in)
- Weight: 84 kg (185 lb)

Playing career^{1}
Years	Club	Games (Goals)
1946–1951	Richmond	93 (23)
- ^{1} Playing statistics correct to the end of 1951.

Raymond Gordon "Ray" Stokes (21 May 1924 – 26 February 2017) was an Australian rules footballer who played with Richmond in the Victorian Football League (VFL). He was born in Longford.

After making his debut for Richmond in the 1946 season, Stokes went on to play with the club for six years. He played in the midfield, as either a centreman or on the wing. Stokes had been recruited from Burnie in Tasmania and he returned there after leaving Richmond and became their coach. He represented the Tasmanian interstate side at the 1953 Adelaide and 1956 Perth carnivals.

Stokes was also a cricketer and played first-class cricket for Tasmania. A left-handed batsman, he played nine first-class matches in total, scoring 323 runs at 24.84 with a highest score of 83. He was the older brother of Richmond footballer Jervis Stokes.

== See also ==
- List of Tasmanian representative cricketers
