= Billy Picken =

Australian rules footballer (1956–2022)

Personal information
- Full name: William Robert Picken
- Born: 7 June 1956
- Died: 23 July 2022 (aged 66)
- Original team: Macarthur
- Height: 185 cm (6 ft 1 in)
- Weight: 81 kg (179 lb)

Playing career^{1}
Years	Club	Games (Goals)
1974–1983	Collingwood	207 (44)
1984–1985	Sydney	28 (0)
1986	Collingwood	5 (2)
Total		240 (46)
- ^{1} Playing statistics correct to the end of 1986.

Career highlights
- 2× Copeland Trophy: (1978, 1983); Collingwood Team of the Century (Half-Back flank); Third Brownlow Medal 1977

William Robert Picken (7 June 1956 – 23 July 2022) was an Australian rules footballer who played for the Collingwood Football Club and the Sydney Swans in the Victorian Football League (VFL). Picken was still at school when he arrived at Collingwood in 1974 from Macarthur as a forward and developed into a talented centre-half back.

Despite playing in four losing grand finals, Picken maintained his reputation as a finals performer and was recognised for his contributions when he was named in the Collingwood Team of the Century. A notable example of his exploits was a spectacular mark in the 1979 grand final.

Picken was a dashing defender, capable of taking a spectacular mark and dashing off with the ball turning defence into attack in an instant.

When Picken controversially moved to the Swans in 1984, he was hit by a succession of injuries for the first time in his career. He later returned to Victoria Park to captain-coach the reserves.

Picken is the father of former Western Bulldogs player Liam Picken and former Brisbane Lions player Marcus Picken, and the uncle of former Brisbane Lions captain Jonathan Brown.

He also played first-grade cricket for Collingwood Cricket Club and had the dubious distinction of being the first first-grade cricketer ever to be suspended by the Victorian Cricket Association for striking an opponent during a cricket match.
