= Adam Lange =

Australian rules footballer

Personal information
- Full name: Adam Lange
- Born: 12 January 1979 (age 47)
- Draft: 74th overall, 1998 National Draft
- Height: 186 cm (6 ft 1 in)
- Weight: 95 kg (209 lb)

Playing career^{1}
Years	Club	Games (Goals)
1996–1997	Subiaco	13 (13)
1998	Sturt	12
1999–2002	Kangaroos	28 (22)
2003–2009	Swan Districts	125 (135)
- ^{1} Playing statistics correct to the end of 2009.

Adam Lange (born 12 January 1979) is a former Australian rules footballer who played with the Kangaroos in the Australian Football League (AFL).

Lange, who captained his state at Teal Cup level, started his career at Subiaco in 1996 and spent two seasons playing for the WAFL club. He moved to South Australian club Sturt in 1998 and appeared in their grand final loss to Port Adelaide that year. At the end of the season, the Kangaroos picked him up with the 74th selection of the 1998 AFL draft.

A versatile player, he was used as both a forward and defender during his time in the AFL. In 2000 he won an AFL Rising Star nomination, missed just two regular season games and appeared in their semi final win, only to miss out on their next final.

After managing a return of just two games in 2001 and 2002, Lange returned to Western Australia in 2003 and signed with Swan Districts. He had a prolific season in 2006, with 484 disposals, 144 marks and 30 goals from his 19 games to win his second Swan Medal. The following year he was made club captain but missed the second half of the season with a broken leg. He also missed the 2008 WAFL Grand Final, due to a broken collarbone and in 2009 appeared in a preliminary final loss before announcing his retirement.
