= Tristan Cartledge =

Australian Rules Football player

Personal information
- Full name: Tristan Cartledge
- Born: 11 June 1985 (age 41); Victoria
- Original team: North Ballarat Rebels / North Ballarat Roosters
- Draft: 28th overall, 2002; Essendon Bombers
- Height: 199 cm (6 ft 6 in)
- Weight: 93 kg (205 lb)
- Position: Ruckman

Playing career^{1}
Years	Club	Games (Goals)
2002–2007	Essendon	7 (1)
2008	Richmond	2 (1)
Total		9 (2)
- ^{1} Playing statistics correct to the end of 2008.

Career highlights
- VFL: VFL team of the Year 2007

Tristan Cartledge (born 11 June 1985) is an Australian Rules Football player, who played for the Richmond Football Club and Essendon Football Club. He began his career at Essendon in 2002 after being drafted in the 2002 National Draft at selection 28.

Cartledge only managed 7 games for Essendon before being delisted at the end of the 2006 season by longtime coach Kevin Sheedy.

He was then given a lifeline by Richmond Coach Terry Wallace, when he was selected in round three of the 2007 Rookie Draft at selection 33. He was delisted at the end of the 2008 season after playing 2 games with the club. Currently plays for North Ballarat in the Ballarat Football League
