= Sam Butler (footballer, born 1986) =

Australian rules footballer

Personal information
- Full name: Samuel Butler
- Born: 14 January 1986 (age 40)
- Original team: Central District (SANFL)
- Draft: No. 20, 2003 national draft
- Height: 187 cm (6 ft 2 in)
- Weight: 82 kg (181 lb)
- Position: Defender

Playing career^{1}
Years	Club	Games (Goals)
2004–2017	West Coast	166 (16)
- ^{1} Playing statistics correct to the end of 2017.

Career highlights
- AFL Rising Star nominee 2004; West Coast premiership player: 2006; Chris Mainwaring Medal 2014

Samuel Butler (born January 14, 1986) is a former professional Australian rules footballer who played for the West Coast Eagles in the Australian Football League (AFL).

Raised in Gawler, South Australia, Butler took up Australian rules football as a teenager. In 2003, he played for Central District's reserves team in the South Australian National Football League (SANFL), which won that season's reserves premiership. Later that year, the West Coast Eagles selected him with the 20th pick in the AFL National Draft. Butler debuted for West Coast during the 2004 season and was nominated for the AFL Rising Star award.

A medium-sized defender and occasional midfielder, Butler played in West Coast's 2006 premiership team but was limited during the following season due to a groin injury. Butler struggled with groin injuries throughout his career, playing his 100th game in 2013, nine seasons after his debut. He retired in 2017.

== Career ==
Butler began playing Australian rules football as a teenager. He represented South Australia at under-16 level, starting with South Gawler Football Club before joining Central District Football Club's youth development team. As a member of the AIS/AFL Academy, he represented South Australia at the AFL Under-18 Championships in 2002 and 2003 and was part of Central District's reserves SANFL premiership team in 2003.

In 2004, Butler made his AFL debut for the West Coast Eagles in Round 10 against Richmond. He went on to play 12 games that season, including a loss in an elimination final against Sydney. In 2006, Butler was a member of the premiership-winning team.

In 2007, due to a persistent groin strain (osteitis pubis), Butler did not play in any AFL games, only playing WAFL reserve games for Perth. In 2014, Butler experienced the best performance of his career during the Round 20 match of the season against Collingwood.

Butler amassed 25 disposals in the 2015 AFL Grand Final and remained under contract with the Eagles until his retirement at the end of the 2017 season. After retirement, Butler accepted a position in West Coast's commercial partnerships team.

== Statistics ==
Across his 166-game career, Butler recorded a total of 16 goals and 22 behinds, amassing 2,701 disposals (1,603 kicks, 1,098 handballs), 746 marks, and 433 tackles. His per-game averages were 16.3 disposals, 9.7 kicks, 6.6 handballs, 4.5 marks, and 2.6 tackles.

Legend
G	Goals	K	Kicks	D	Disposals	T	Tackles
B	Behinds	H	Handballs	M	Marks

Season	Team	No.	Games	Totals							Averages (per game)						
Season	Team	No.	Games	G	B	K	H	D	M	T	G	B	K	H	D	M	T
2004	West Coast	26	12	1	2	87	77	164	33	16	0.1	0.2	7.3	6.4	13.7	2.8	1.3
2005	West Coast	26	14	3	2	103	62	165	51	18	0.2	0.1	7.4	4.4	11.8	3.6	1.3
2006	West Coast	26	14	6	5	156	123	279	58	59	0.4	0.4	11.1	8.8	19.9	4.1	4.2
2007	West Coast	26	0	—	—	—	—	—	—	—	—	—	—	—	—	—	—
2008	West Coast	26	5	0	3	49	30	79	21	11	0.0	0.6	9.8	6.0	15.8	4.2	2.2
2009	West Coast	26	16	1	1	132	124	256	60	38	0.1	0.1	8.3	7.8	16.0	3.8	2.4
2010	West Coast	26	5	0	0	45	47	92	26	17	0.0	0.0	9.0	9.4	18.4	5.2	3.4
2011	West Coast	26	13	0	0	160	68	228	80	51	0.0	0.0	12.3	5.2	17.5	6.2	3.9
2012	West Coast	26	14	1	3	177	68	245	74	33	0.1	0.2	12.6	4.9	17.5	5.3	2.4
2013	West Coast	26	15	1	2	167	101	268	78	58	0.1	0.1	11.1	6.7	17.9	5.2	3.9
2014	West Coast	26	12	1	1	108	84	192	47	34	0.1	0.1	9.0	7.0	16.0	3.9	2.8
2015	West Coast	26	17	2	3	181	123	304	96	32	0.1	0.2	10.6	7.2	17.9	5.6	1.9
2016	West Coast	26	20	0	0	162	136	298	86	54	0.0	0.0	8.1	6.8	14.9	4.3	2.7
2017	West Coast	26	9	0	0	76	55	131	36	12	0.0	0.0	8.4	6.1	14.6	4.0	1.3
Career			166	16	22	1603	1098	2701	746	433	0.1	0.1	9.7	6.6	16.3	4.5	2.6

== See also ==
- List of AFL debuts in 2004
- List of West Coast Eagles players
