= Aaron Shattock =

Australian rules footballer (born 1980)

Personal information
- Nickname: Aaron Shattock
- Born: 2 May 1980 (age 46)
- Original team: Woodville-West Torrens
- Draft: 45th overall, 1998 AFL draft
- Height: 187 cm (6 ft 2 in)
- Weight: 87 kg (192 lb)
- Position: Midfielder

Playing career^{1}
| Years | Club | Games (Goals) |
| 2000–2004 | Brisbane Lions | 57 (15) |
| 2005–2006 | Port Adelaide | 11 (1) |
| Total | | 68 (16) |
- ^{1} Playing statistics correct to the end of 2006.

Career highlights
- AFL premiership player: 2002; AFLQ premiership player: 2001

Aaron Shattock (born 2 May 1980) is an Australian rules footballer who played with the Brisbane Lions and Port Adelaide in the Australian Football League (AFL).

== AFL career ==
=== Brisbane Lions (2000–2004) ===
A midfielder, Shattock was recruited to Brisbane from Woodville-West Torrens and made his debut in 2000. He played for Brisbane's reserves team in the winning 2001 AFLQ State League Grand Final.

The highlight of his career was starting on the interchange bench in Brisbane's 2002 AFL Grand Final win over Collingwood. He remained with the club until the end of the 2004 season.

=== Port Adelaide (2005–2006) ===
In 2005 and 2006 he played with Port Adelaide. He was delisted at the end of 2006 season.

== QAFL career ==
After retiring from the AFL, Shattock served as the captain of Labrador in the Queensland Australian Football League (QAFL) for over a decade.

== Personal life ==
It was reported on 22 December 2024, that Shattock had been seriously injured in an accident on his property in Queensland.

== Statistics ==
Legend
| G | Goals | K | Kicks | D | Disposals | T | Tackles |
| B | Behinds | H | Handballs | M | Marks |

| Season | Team | No. | Games | Totals | | | | | | | Averages (per game) | | | | | | | Votes |
| Season | Team | No. | Games | G | B | K | H | D | M | T | G | B | K | H | D | M | T | Votes |
|---|---|---|---|---|---|---|---|---|---|---|---|---|---|---|---|---|---|---|
| 2000 | Brisbane Lions | 34 | 9 | 0 | 0 | 36 | 32 | 68 | 15 | 9 | 0.0 | 0.0 | 4.0 | 3.6 | 7.6 | 1.7 | 1.0 | 0 |
| 2001 | Brisbane Lions | 34 | 6 | 0 | 0 | 30 | 18 | 48 | 16 | 3 | 0.0 | 0.0 | 5.0 | 3.0 | 8.0 | 2.7 | 0.5 | 0 |
| 2002 | Brisbane Lions | 34 | 17 | 7 | 5 | 92 | 46 | 138 | 42 | 19 | 0.4 | 0.3 | 5.4 | 2.7 | 8.1 | 2.5 | 1.1 | 0 |
| 2003 | Brisbane Lions | 34 | 18 | 7 | 1 | 103 | 66 | 169 | 55 | 29 | 0.4 | 0.1 | 5.7 | 3.7 | 9.4 | 3.1 | 1.6 | 0 |
| 2004 | Brisbane Lions | 34 | 7 | 1 | 1 | 45 | 23 | 68 | 25 | 7 | 0.1 | 0.1 | 6.4 | 3.3 | 9.7 | 3.6 | 1.0 | 0 |
| 2005 | Port Adelaide | 12 | 10 | 1 | 0 | 67 | 64 | 131 | 38 | 12 | 0.1 | 0.0 | 6.7 | 6.4 | 13.1 | 3.8 | 1.2 | 0 |
| 2006 | Port Adelaide | 12 | 1 | 0 | 0 | 13 | 5 | 18 | 8 | 2 | 0.0 | 0.0 | 13.0 | 5.0 | 18.0 | 8.0 | 2.0 | 0 |
| Career | | | 68 | 16 | 7 | 386 | 254 | 640 | 199 | 81 | 0.2 | 0.1 | 5.7 | 3.7 | 9.4 | 2.9 | 1.2 | 0 |
