= Luke Shackleton =

Australian rules footballer

Personal information
- Full name: Luke Shackleton
- Born: 17 November 1984 (age 41)
- Original teams: Burnie Dockers / Tassie Mariners
- Draft: 29th, 2002 National draft
- Height: 179 cm (5 ft 10 in)
- Weight: 88 kg (194 lb)

Playing career^{1}
Years	Club	Games (Goals)
2004	Collingwood	1 (0)
- ^{1} Playing statistics correct to the end of 2004.

Luke Shackleton (born 17 November 1984) is an Australian rules footballer who played with Collingwood in the Australian Football League (AFL).

Shackleton was a second round draft selection by Collingwood, on the back of his Morrish Medal winning performances with the Tassie Mariners in the 2002 TAC Cup season.

He played at Williamstown in 2003, the feeder club for Collingwood which compete in the Victorian Football League. The following year he made his AFL debut, against Richmond on the Melbourne Cricket Ground. He played as a midfielder but spent much of the match on the bench.

Delisted without playing another game, Shackleton joined the Tasmanian Devils in 2005. He later returned to his original club, the Burnie Dockers, whom he would captain in the 2011 Tasmanian Football League season.
