= Liam Picken =

Australian rules footballer (born 1986)

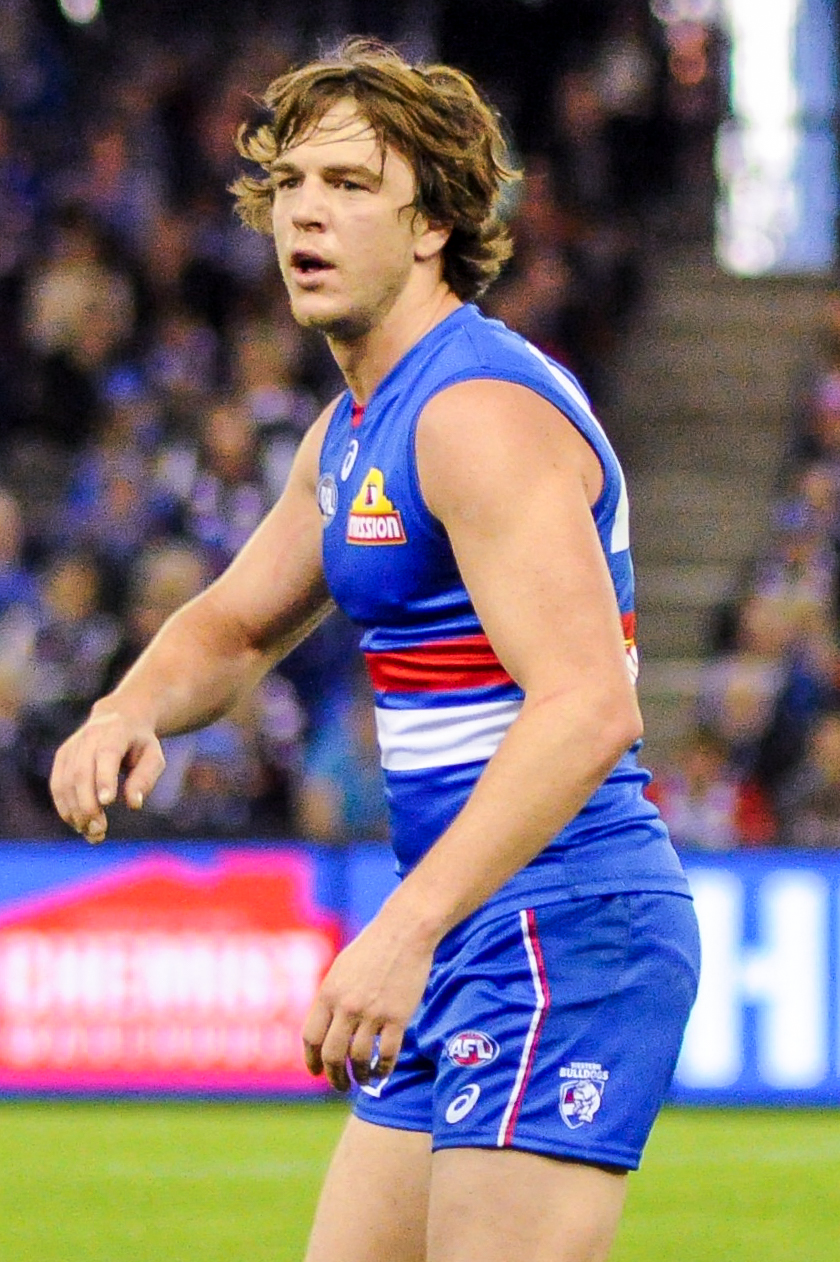
- Picken playing for the Western Bulldogs in June 2017

Personal information
- Full name: Liam Picken
- Born: 1 August 1986 (age 40); Hamilton, Victoria, Australia
- Original team: Williamstown (VFL)
- Draft: No. 30, 2009 rookie draft
- Height: 185 cm (6 ft 1 in)
- Weight: 83 kg (183 lb)
- Position: Midfielder

Playing career^{1}
Years	Club	Games (Goals)
2009–2019	Western Bulldogs	198 (87)

International team honours^{2}
Years	Team	Games (Goals)
2010	Australia	2 (0)
- ^{1} Playing statistics correct to the end of 2019.^{2} Representative statistics correct as of 2010.

Career highlights
- AFL premiership player (2016); Western Bulldogs leading goalkicker (2017); Pre-season premiership player (2010); Gerry Callahan Medal (2008)

Liam Picken (born 1 August 1986) is a former Australian rules footballer who played for the Western Bulldogs in the Australian Football League (AFL) from 2009 to 2019. He is from the western Victorian town of Hamilton.

== Early playing career ==
Before being drafted he completed a pre-season with Collingwood and two with the Bulldogs. He played 63 games and kicked 45 goals with Williamstown from 2005 to 2008 and in 2008 he was the Williamstown Seagulls best and fairest player in the Victorian Football League (VFL), winning the Gerry Callahan Medal and earning a position on the Bulldogs rookie list. He played in a Seconds premiership side at Williamstown in 2005 and finished in third place in the Seconds best and fairest the same year. He was awarded the most consistent player in the seniors in 2007.

== AFL career ==
Picken made his debut against North Melbourne on 5 April 2009, collecting 9 possessions in a traditional tagging role against Kangaroos stalwart Brent Harvey, in which he kept his opponent goalless and largely ineffective.

Following his debut, he played on other key players to great effect including Andrew McLeod, Leigh Montagna and Brett Deledio. He played on Deledio twice in 2009 and restricted the star player to just 16 and 13 disposals respectively, the only two times during the season that Deledio had fewer than 20 touches.

During a match against Fremantle in 2013, Picken accidentally collided with goal umpire Courtney Lai in the third quarter, when he was attempting to smother a point-blank shot at goal by Michael Walters; the result was that Lai, a qualified doctor, suffered what was a self-diagnosed an ACL tear. Picken recalled the clash as being "an accident".

Although branded as a tagger, Picken could also win possession of the ball and use it well. When Luke Beveridge took over as coach of the Bulldogs at the end of 2014, he gave Picken a more attacking role. During the Bulldogs' run to the 2016 AFL Premiership, Picken was a crucial figure, starring in all four finals and kicked three goals (including the sealer) in the Grand Final. He was awarded the Best Finals Player by the Western Bulldogs.

In 2017, the Australian food company Australian Almonds approached Picken, along with fellow footballers Scott Selwood, Max Gawn, Brianna Davey and Ellie Blackburn, to serve as an ambassador of their campaign to recognise hard-working but low-profile individuals through the Australian Hard Nut Awards. Also in 2017, the late cricket legend Shane Warne ranked Picken as his favourite player in the league.

While playing in a pre-season game against Hawthorn in Ballarat, Picken received an accidental knock to the head and suffered severe concussion and because of side effects missed the entire 2018 season.

On 1 April 2019, after numerous comeback attempts, Picken announced his retirement due to ongoing concussion symptoms.

== Personal life ==
Picken is the son of former Collingwood and Sydney footballer: Billy Picken, who's a member of the Collingwood Team of the Century and played across both clubs from 1973 to 1986. Picken's older brother, Marcus Picken, also played for the Brisbane Lions, as did their cousin, former captain and Coleman Medal winner Jonathan Brown.

He is married to Annie Nolan, a blogger and social commentator. They have three children: a son named Malachy (born in 2011) and twin daughters, Delphi and Cheska (born in 2013).

Liam Picken has pledged to donate his brain in hopes to aid further research in chronic traumatic encephopathy as a result of repetitive head injuries sustained during his time in the AFL.

Picken possesses undergraduate and masters degrees in international finance and business.

In March 2023, Picken lodged a claim in the Supreme Court of Victoria against the AFL, the Western Bulldogs and two Bulldogs club doctors regarding concussion-related injuries, with Picken alleging that he was left in the dark about “irregular” cognitive tests, that he was never sent for expert help and he was repeatedly sent back onto the field to play despite repeatedly raising concerns about his ongoing concussion symptoms. His initiation of a civil claim against the AFL occurred shortly after a similar claim was filed by former Collingwood player Emma Grant in the County Court of Victoria, and shortly before a similar claim was filed by former Geelong player Max Rooke in the Supreme Court of Victoria.

== Statistics ==
Statistics are correct to the end of the 2017 season

Legend
G	Goals	K	Kicks	D	Disposals	T	Tackles
B	Behinds	H	Handballs	M	Marks

Season	Team	No.	Games	Totals							Averages (per game)						
Season	Team	No.	Games	G	B	K	H	D	M	T	G	B	K	H	D	M	T
2009	Western Bulldogs	42	23	8	2	120	190	310	52	98	0.3	0.1	5.2	8.3	13.5	2.3	4.3
2010	Western Bulldogs	42	20	8	5	127	158	285	37	104	0.4	0.3	6.4	7.9	14.3	1.9	5.2
2011	Western Bulldogs	42	22	4	4	166	164	330	50	117	0.2	0.2	7.5	7.5	15.0	2.3	5.3
2012	Western Bulldogs	42	22	9	6	197	207	404	70	119	0.4	0.3	9.0	9.4	18.4	3.2	5.4
2013	Western Bulldogs	42	20	1	3	181	146	327	67	66	0.1	0.2	9.1	7.3	16.4	3.4	3.3
2014	Western Bulldogs	42	22	3	6	217	185	402	85	88	0.1	0.3	9.9	8.4	18.3	3.9	4.0
2015	Western Bulldogs	42	21	13	9	248	249	497	94	135	0.6	0.4	11.8	11.9	23.7	4.5	6.4
2016^{#}	Western Bulldogs	42	26	17	11	300	294	594	121	107	0.7	0.4	11.5	11.3	22.8	4.7	4.1
2017	Western Bulldogs	42	22	24	14	197	213	410	84	67	1.1	0.6	9.0	9.7	18.6	3.8	3.1
Career			198	87	60	1753	1806	3559	660	901	0.4	0.3	8.9	9.1	18.0	3.3	4.6

== Honours and achievements ==
AFL

- Team
  - AFL Premiership: 2016
  - Pre-season Premiership player: 2010
- Individual
  - Best Finals Player: 2016
  - Gerry Callahan Medal: 2008
