= Richard Hadley =

Australian rules footballer, born 1983

Personal information
- Full name: Richard Hadley
- Born: 29 March 1983 (age 43); Gnowangerup, Western Australia
- Original team: East Fremantle
- Draft: 22nd overall, 2000 AFL draft 52nd overall, 2007 AFL draft
- Height: 190 cm (6 ft 3 in)
- Weight: 90 kg (198 lb)
- Position: Midfielder

Playing career^{1}
Years	Club	Games (Goals)
2001 – 2007	Brisbane Lions	41 (10)
2008 – 2010	Carlton	25 (6)
Total		66 (16)
- ^{1} Playing statistics correct to the end of 2010.

Career highlights
- AFL premiership player: 2003; AFLQ premiership player: 2001

Richard Hadley (born 29 March 1983) is a former Australian rules footballer who played for the Brisbane Lions and Carlton in the Australian Football League (AFL).

Hadley was recruited from the East Fremantle Football Club junior system in the Western Australian Football League (WAFL) to the Brisbane Lions in the 2000 AFL draft. He made his AFL debut in 2001, and played for Brisbane's reserves team in the winning 2001 AFLQ State League Grand Final.

While suffering from osteitis pubis, he spent the 2001, 2002 and 2003 seasons as a prolific ball-winner player in the Lions' reserves team. After a long wait, he was finally recalled to the Lions lineup in the 2003 finals series, and in his fourth senior game of AFL football, he was part of Brisbane's premiership side.

In 2004, Hadley's fourth season on the Lions' list, he took the Rookie of the Year award (he was still eligible because he had only played four games previously and was 20 years of age at the start of the year, just below the under 21 threshold). During the 2005 season, he injured his anterior cruciate ligament (ACL) and missed the entire season.

While his schedule to a return was on track, he again injured his ACL during a NAB Challenge game against Collingwood at Carrara on 18 March 2006. He then missed the entire 2006 season.

Hadley was traded to Carlton at the end of the 2007 season for Carlton's fourth-round selection in the 2007 AFL draft (number 52 overall). He continued to be troubled by injuries, playing six games in 2008, eleven in 2009 and eight in 2010. He also played several games for Carlton's VFL-affiliate, the Northern Bullants.

Hadley announced his retirement from AFL football after the 2010 season, at the age of 27. After spending ten seasons on an AFL playing list, injuries had restricted him to 66 AFL games. He returned to East Fremantle, where he had played as a junior, and played 49 WAFL matches for the club between 2011 and 2013, including serving as vice-captain, before retiring at the end of the 2013 season. Currently runs Healthfreak Cafe Applecross, WA.

== Statistics ==
Legend
G	Goals	K	Kicks	D	Disposals	T	Tackles
B	Behinds	H	Handballs	M	Marks

Season	Team	No.	Games	Totals							Averages (per game)						
Season	Team	No.	Games	G	B	K	H	D	M	T	G	B	K	H	D	M	T
2001	Brisbane Lions	14	1	0	1	3	1	4	1	3	0.0	1.0	3.0	1.0	4.0	1.0	3.0
2002	Brisbane Lions	14	0	—	—	—	—	—	—	—	—	—	—	—	—	—	—
2003	Brisbane Lions	14	3	1	1	14	10	24	6	6	0.3	0.3	4.7	3.3	8.0	2.0	2.0
2004	Brisbane Lions	14	23	6	6	148	162	310	77	68	0.3	0.3	6.4	7.0	13.5	3.3	3.0
2005	Brisbane Lions	14	0	—	—	—	—	—	—	—	—	—	—	—	—	—	—
2006	Brisbane Lions	14	0	—	—	—	—	—	—	—	—	—	—	—	—	—	—
2007	Brisbane Lions	14	14	3	3	116	118	234	54	36	0.2	0.2	8.3	8.4	16.7	3.9	2.6
2008	Carlton	10	6	2	3	41	49	90	26	27	0.3	0.5	6.8	8.2	15.0	4.3	4.5
2009	Carlton	10	11	3	2	79	128	207	45	45	0.3	0.2	7.2	11.6	18.8	4.1	4.1
2010	Carlton	10	8	1	1	50	88	138	23	36	0.1	0.1	6.3	11.0	17.3	2.9	4.5
Career			66	16	17	451	556	1007	232	221	0.2	0.3	6.8	8.4	15.3	3.5	3.3
