= Burnie Dockers Football Club =

Australian football club

Burnie Dockers

Names
- Full name: Burnie Dockers Football Club
- Nickname: Dockers
- Club song: "We're a happy team at Burnie"

2020 (NWFL) season
- After finals: Premiers
- Leading goalkicker: Harry Walters (25)

Club details
- Founded: 1995; 31 years ago
- Colours
- Competition: NWFL
- President: Peter Vincent
- Coach: TBA
- Ground: West Park, Burnie (capacity: 12,000)

Uniforms
Home	Away

Other information
- Official website: burniedockers.com.au

Burnie Dockers Football Club is an Australian rules football club in Burnie Tasmania, Australia. The club currently competes in the North West Football League (NWFL).

== Club history ==
The Burnie Dockers were formed as a result of a merger between former TFL Statewide League club Burnie Hawks (formerly known as Cooee) and NTFL club the Burnie Tigers. After several years of bitter hatred in the city between the two rival clubs, both clubs were struggling both on-field and financially by the early 1990s.

In late 1993 the Burnie Hawks absorbed the Burnie Tigers and merged, however the club still played as the Burnie Hawks until, with the arrival of former North Melbourne champion Peter German, the club adopted a new emblem, colours and jumper designed to appease both sides of the divide.

From 1995 the Burnie Dockers were successful, making the 1996 and 1997 Grand Finals, but ultimately losing both to Southern powerhouse, Clarence. Shortly after, the Dockers found themselves (like many TFL clubs during the 1990s) in serious financial trouble and facing extinction until a late bailout by the Burnie City Council saved them. The Dockers participated in the Tasmanian Football League until 2000 when it announced it would be pulling out of the fledgling competition, the League therefore folding and the Dockers joined the Northern Tasmanian Football League in 2001.

The Burnie Dockers won five consecutive NTFL premierships from 2001 to 2005. The Burnie Dockers' next grand final was in 2008 against the Launceston Blues, losing by 13 points at Latrobe.

Burnie rejoined the newly re-established Tasmanian State League (TSL) competition in 2009, and has played there since. Since 2015, its reserves team has competed in the North West Football League seniors, and it has also fielded teams in the junior grades of that competition.

Burnie Dockers first fielded a women's team in 2013 in the Tasmanian Women's League. The Dockers competed in 3 consecutive grand finals taking out the TWL premierships in 2014 and 2016.

In 2017, Burnie withdrew from the NWFL seniors and reserves competitions due to lack of players. In 2018, they withdrew from the Tasmanian Football League and rejoined the NWFL seniors, citing lack of players and raising questions about AFL support of local footy.

== Club song ==
The club song is "We're a happy team at Burnie" which is based on "The Yankee Doodle Boy".

== Statistics and records ==
Affiliations – Burnie Tigers:

- 1885–1912 – North West Football
- 1913–1921 – Burnie Football League
- 1922–1931 – North West Football Union
- 1932–1933 – Burnie Football League
- 1934–1940 – North West Football Union
- 1945 – Burnie Football League
- 1946–1986 – North West Football Union
- 1987–1993 – Northern Tasmanian Football League

Affiliations – Cooee Bulldogs/Burnie Hawks:

- 1920–1922; 1930–1944 – Junior competitions
- 1945–1986 – North Western Football Union
- 1987–1994 – TFL Statewide League

Affiliations – Burnie Dockers:

- 1995–2000 – TFL Statewide League
- 2001–2008 – Northern Tasmanian Football League
- 2009–2017 – Tasmanian State League
- 2015–2016, 2018–present – North West Football League

Home ground:

- West Park Oval

Formed:

- Burnie Tigers: 1885 (as Emu Bay)
- Cooee Bulldogs: 1894 (became Burnie Hawks in 1987)
- Burnie Dockers: 1995

Colours:

- Purple, green, red and white (old)
- Purple and white (-present)

Emblem:

- Dockers

Premierships – Burnie Tigers:

- 1899, 1911, 1927, 1928, 1937, 1939, 1954, 1958, 1959, 1960, 1962, 1963, 1966, 1974, 1992

Tasmanian State Premierships:

- 1963

Premierships – Cooee Bulldogs:

- 1930, 1931, 1933, 1934, 1935, 1936, 1941, 1961, 1964, 1965, 1973, 1978, 1982

Tasmanian State Premierships:

- 1964, 1978

Premierships – Burnie Dockers:

- 2001, 2002, 2003, 2004, 2005

TSL Premierships:

- 2012

Cheel Medallists:

- 1928 – Charlie Hallam – {Burnie Tigers}

S.L Alford Medallists:

- 1937 – Clem Riggs – {Burnie Tigers}

Wander Medallists:

- 1949 – Len Hayes – {Cooee Bulldogs}
- 1950 – Lou Redman – {Cooee Bulldogs}
- 1954 – Ray Stokes – {Burnie Tigers}
- 1973 – Graeme Shephard – {Cooee Bulldogs}
- 1979 – Tom Lee – {Cooee Bulldogs}

Baldock Medallists:

- 2003 – Nick Probert – {Burnie Dockers}
- 2008 – Kade Munday – {Burnie Dockers}
- 2012 – Jason Laycock – {Burnie Dockers}

All-Australians:

- Nil

NWFU leading goalkickers:

- 1947 – G. Goninon {Burnie Tigers} – 67
- 1948 – B. Quirk {Burnie Tigers} – 52
- 1961 – M. Morse {Burnie Tigers} – 60
- 1971 – D. Hodgetts {Burnie Tigers} – 79
- 1972 – D. Hodgetts {Burnie Tigers} – 73
- 1979 – L. Barnes {Burnie Tigers} – 82
- 1952 – D. Anderson {Cooee Bulldogs} – 89
- 1957 – L. Hayes {Cooee Bulldogs} – 51
- 1972 – S. Beaumont {Cooee Bulldogs} – 73
- 1973 – A. Hodgetts {Cooee Bulldogs} – 73
- 1975 – D. Shepherd {Cooee Bulldogs} – 60
- 1976 – D. Shepherd {Cooee Bulldogs} – 102
- 1978 – S. Beaumont {Cooee Bulldogs} – 94
- 1984 – S. Beaumont {Cooee Bulldogs} – 143

NTFL leading goalkickers:

- 1991 – C. Reynolds {Burnie Tigers} – 76
- 1992 – C. Reynolds {Burnie Tigers} – 96
- 2001 – A. Hering {Burnie Dockers} – 102

TFL Statewide League leading goalkickers:

- 1996 – Justin Plapp {Burnie Dockers} – 98

Highest scores:

- Burnie Tigers 30.21 (201) v Penguin in 1963
- Cooee 31.22 (208) v North Launceston 6.13 (49) in 1982
- Burnie Dockers 49.35 (329) v Smithton 0.1 (1) in 2001

Most games:

- 265 – David Langmaid – {Burnie Tigers}
- 288 – Anthony 'Tom' Lee – {Cooee Bulldogs}

Record finals attendance:

- Burnie Tigers: 13,223 v Hobart – 1959 State Grand Final at North Hobart Oval
- Burnie Dockers: 12,352 v Clarence – 1996 TFL Grand Final at North Hobart Oval

== Notable players ==
There is a list of past and present Burnie Dockers players who have played at AFL:

- Cameron Cloke (Collingwood, Carlton and Port Adelaide)
- Brad Davis (Fitzroy)
- Robbie Fox (Sydney Swans)
- Peter German (North Melbourne)
- Brady Grey (Fremantle)
- Andrew Hill (Collingwood)
- Tom Hislop (Essendon and Richmond)
- Jason Laycock (Essendon)
- Andrew Lee (Essendon)
- Brad Pearce (Brisbane Bears and Carlton)
- Justin Plapp (Richmond and St. Kilda)
- Keenan Reynolds (Footscray and North Melbourne)
- Russell Robertson (Melbourne)
- Luke Russell (Gold Coast)
- Luke Shackleton (Collingwood)
- Eli Templeton (St. Kilda)
- Lachie Weller (Fremantle and Gold Coast)
- Maverick Weller (Gold Coast and St. Kilda)
- Grant Williams (Melbourne)
- Brody Mihocek (Collingwood and Melbourne)
