= Fabian Deluca =

Australian rules footballer

Personal information
- Full name: Fabian Deluca
- Born: 27 January 1987 (age 39)
- Original team: Eastern Ranges
- Height: 203 cm (6 ft 8 in)
- Weight: 100 kg (220 lb)

Playing career^{1}
| Years | Club | Games (Goals) |
| 2006–2008 | Port Adelaide | 11 (1) |
- ^{1} Playing statistics correct to the end of 2008.

Fabian Deluca (born 27 January 1987) is a former professional Australian rules footballer who played for the Port Adelaide Football Club in the Australian Football League (AFL). He was recruited from the Eastern Ranges in the TAC Cup.

He made his AFL debut in round 5, 2006 against Collingwood as a ruckman. Deluca was delisted from Port Adelaide at the conclusion of the 2008 season. His brother, Adrian, played with the Carlton Football Club from 2004 to 2006.
