= Michael Stevens (footballer) =

Australian rules footballer (born 1980)

Personal information
- Full name: Michael Stevens
- Born: 7 November 1980 (age 46)
- Original team: Murray Bushrangers
- Draft: 5th overall, 1998 AFL draft
- Height: 179 cm (5 ft 10 in)
- Weight: 80 kg (176 lb)
- Position: Wingman

Playing career^{1}
Years	Club	Games (Goals)
1999–2002	Port Adelaide	17 (3)
2003–2005	Kangaroos	44 (16)
Total		61 (19)
- ^{1} Playing statistics correct to the end of 2005.

Michael Stevens (born 7 November 1980) is a former Australian rules footballer who played for Port Adelaide and the Kangaroos in the Australian Football League (AFL).

Stevens was a member the Murray Bushrangers inaugural TAC Cup premiership in 1998 and was voted 'Best on Ground' in the Grand Final victory over the Geelong Falcons. On the back of his performances at Under-18 level, Stevens was the fifth player picked in the 1998 AFL draft. A wingman, he was unable to hold on to a spot in the Port Adelaide team although he did participate in their 2002 Wizard Cup triumph.

Stevens joined his elder brother Anthony Stevens at the Kangaroos in 2003, after being traded for Stuart Cochrane. Stevens was a regular in the side throughout 2004 and missed just two games, polling his first and only Brownlow Medal votes when he was awarded three for a performance against Carlton. The following season, he appeared in 19 of a possible 22 home and away matches; Stevens also took part in their Elimination Final loss to his old club, Port Adelaide. Stevens signed for Murray Football League team Mulwala in 2006.

In 2008, Stevens played for the Benalla Football Club in the Goulburn Valley Football League. Stevens then played for Yarrawonga, in the Ovens and Murray Football League, from 2009 to 2012, playing in four consecutive Ovens and Murray Football League grand finals, winning a premiership in 2012.

Stevens also won the 2009 Ovens and Murray Football League best and fairest award, the Morris Medal, then later retired in early 2013.
