= Andy Angwin =

Australian rules footballer (1918–2002)

Personal information
- Full name: Lawrence Andrew Angwin
- Born: 4 September 1918; Boulder, Western Australia
- Died: 14 July 2002 (aged 83)
- Original team: Port Melbourne (VFA)
- Height: 174 cm (5 ft 9 in)
- Weight: 72 kg (159 lb)

Playing career^{1}
Years	Club	Games (Goals)
1938–1944	Hawthorn	75 (10)
- ^{1} Playing statistics correct to the end of 1944.

Career highlights
- Hawthorn best and fairest: 1940

Lawrence Andrew Angwin (4 September 1918 – 14 July 2002) was an Australian rules footballer who played for Hawthorn in the Victorian Football League (VFL).

A wingman, Angwin played with Port Melbourne in the Victorian Football Association before joining Hawthorn; he was the first player to cross from the VFA to the VFL without a clearance after the competitions ended their reciprocal permit agreement in 1938, and as a result he was suspended from playing in the VFA. However, this did not affect his ability to play in the VFL, and he won Hawthorn's best and fairest award in 1940 and finished runner up in the following two seasons. Angwin also did well in the 1941 Brownlow Medal, polling 13 votes to finish equal sixth and earned Victorian selection, representing them against South Australia in an interstate match.

Angwin's grandson Laurence Angwin also played in the Australian Football League.

== Honours and achievements ==
Individual

- Hawthorn best and fairest: 1940
- Hawthorn life member
