= Shane Morrison =

Australian rules footballer (born 1981)

Personal information
- Full name: Shane Morrison
- Born: 10 January 1981 (age 45)
- Original team: Northern Eagles
- Draft: 44th, 1999 AFL draft father–son rule
- Height: 193 cm (6 ft 4 in)
- Weight: 90 kg (198 lb)

Playing career^{1}
Years	Club	Games (Goals)
2002–2003	Brisbane Lions	5 (0)
2004–2005	Richmond	8 (3)
Total		13 (3)
- ^{1} Playing statistics correct to the end of 2005.

Career highlights
- AFLQ premiership player: 2001

Shane Morrison (born 10 January 1981) is an Australian rules footballer who played with the Brisbane Lions and Richmond in the Australian Football League (AFL).

Morrison, who grew up in Cairns, is the son of former South Melbourne player Peter Morrison. As his father had played over 50 games for South Melbourne, Morrison was eligible to be drafted by Sydney under the father–son rule. He was however also able to go to Brisbane using the rule, due to Peter's post VFL career in Queensland. Already in Brisbane playing for the Northern Eagles, he chose to go to the Lions and was picked up with the 44th selection of the 1999 AFL draft.

A key position player, Morrison spent most of his career with the Brisbane Reserves, which competed in the Queensland State League (QSL) and he was a member of their 2001 premiership team. With the presence of key position players like Mal Michael, Jonathan Brown and Alastair Lynch in the side, his opportunities to play AFL were limited. The Lions would end up winning three successive grand finals while he was at the club and he made just five senior appearances.

He nominated for the 2003 AFL draft and was selected by Richmond with pick 64. In the first five weeks he played as many games at Richmond as he had in four years with Brisbane but was selected just once more that season as his club went on to claim the wooden spoon. He was delisted at the end of the 2005 season, having added just two more games.

Morrison played in the South Australian National Football League with Port Adelaide in 2006. He then returned to Queensland and was a member of Mt Gravatt's QSL premiership winning team in 2007.
