= Declan O'Mahony =

Irish Gaelic footballer

Personal information
- Native name: Déaglán Ó Mathúna (Irish)
- Born: Dublin, Ireland

Sport
- Sport: Gaelic football
- Position: Midfield
Club
- Years: Club
- Ballyboden St Enda's
Club titles
- Dublin titles: 2
Inter-county
- Years: County
- Dublin

Declan O'Mahony is a Gaelic footballer who plays for the Ballyboden St Enda's club and for the Dublin county team. He won the 2007 O'Byrne Cup for Dublin against Laois at O'Connor Park in Offaly. The game finished on a scoreline of 1-18 to 2-13 against Laois. He finished the tournament with a total of 1-03.
