= Glen Bowyer =

Australian rules footballer

Personal information
- Full name: Glen Bowyer
- Nickname: Chisel
- Born: 28 December 1979 (age 46)
- Original team: Murray Bushrangers
- Height: 181 cm (5 ft 11 in)
- Weight: 84 kg (185 lb)
- Position: Defender

Playing career^{1}
Years	Club	Games (Goals)
1999–2002	Hawthorn	35 (14)
2004–2005	Carlton	20 (0)
Total		55 (14)
- ^{1} Playing statistics correct to the end of 2005.

Glen Bowyer (born 28 December 1979) is a former Australian rules footballer who played with Hawthorn and Carlton in the Australian Football League (AFL).

Bowyer, who came from Wodonga, did not play competitive football until the age of 15. In Melbourne he played his initial football with the Murray Bushrangers and Hawthorn reserves.

He made his AFL debut in the final round of the 1999 AFL season, from the rookie list. Prior to the 2000 season he was elevated to the senior list and played 19 games for the year, including two finals. He won a Rising Star nomination, averaged 16 disposals a game over the course of the season as well as taking 120 marks, and was heralded as the club's most courageous player. Used on the ball and as a defender, Bowyer played his 30th consecutive game during the 2001 season and commanded a regular spot in the team until injury struck: in the game best remembered for Ben Dixon's after-the-siren game-winning goal, Bowyer broke his leg. He did not play a single senior game in 2002 due to osteitis pubis and leg problems.

As Bowyer recovered from his injuries during 2002, he struggled to cope personally with the isolation of no longer being heavily involved in the game or the club. He struggled badly with depression, and was a heavy user of alcohol and drugs during this time, engaged in self-harm, and contemplated suicide at times. Late in the year and at the height of his depression, Bowyer traveled to the Greek islands on his own, where he almost lost his life after his left arm was badly cut by glass; the exact nature of this incident has not been publicly discussed. He was airlifted to an Athens hospital and a nine-hour operation was required to save his arm.

Upon his return, Bowyer was able to work through his depression. He took more time off for travel in 2003, and Hawthorn co-operatively delisted him to assist him. In his time away, as he overcame his depression, Bowyer became involved in Beyond Blue, the national depression initiative.

He made a return to the AFL in 2004 when Carlton picked him up with the 63rd selection of the 2003 draft. Carlton used Bowyer in a defensive capacity and he put together 20 games in two seasons. His efforts for Carlton's VFL-affiliate, the Northern Bullants, in 2005 were good enough to win him the Laurie Hill Trophy as club best and fairest. However, late in the season he sustained a vertebra injury, and retired from playing at the end of the season.
