= David King (footballer, born 1985) =

Australian rules footballer

Personal information
- Born: 2 February 1985 (age 41)
- Original team: Glenelg (SANFL)
- Debut: Round 4, 18 April 2004, Collingwood vs. Fremantle, at Telstra Dome

Playing career^{1}
Years	Club	Games (Goals)
2004	Collingwood	9 (8)
- ^{1} Playing statistics correct to the end of 2004.

David D. King (born 2 February 1985) is an Australian rules footballer with the Box Hill Hawks of the Victorian Football League (VFL). He has also played for Collingwood Football Club in the Australian Football League (AFL) and Glenelg Football Club in the South Australian National Football League (SANFL). .

Originally from Sacred Heart College in Adelaide, King played junior football with Glenelg Football Club prior to being taken by Collingwood with draft pick number 58 in the 2002 AFL draft.

King made his senior AFL debut in 2004, although he had been speculated as a potential shock inclusion in Collingwood's team against the Brisbane Lions in the lead up to the 2003 AFL Grand Final. Arguably, King's crowning moment arose in the Round 18 game in 2004 against Richmond, when he scored the match-winning goal from close-range followed the following week when he kicked three goals in a promising effort in the boilover victory against Fremantle Football Club.

After three seasons with Collingwood, King was delisted at the end of the 2005 season. He has played for the Box Hill Hawks since then.
