= Luke Penny =

Australian rules footballer, born 1981

Personal information
- Born: 8 February 1981 (age 45)
- Original team: Oakleigh U18
- Debut: Round 13, 4 June 2000, Western Bulldogs vs. Geelong, at Telstra Dome
- Height: 193 cm (6 ft 4 in)
- Weight: 94 kg (207 lb)

Playing career^{1}
Years	Club	Games (Goals)
1999–2002	Western Bulldogs	35 (5)
2003–2005	St Kilda	45 (2)
Total		80 (7)
- ^{1} Playing statistics correct to the end of 2005.

Career highlights
- AFL Rising Star nominee 2001; St Kilda pre-season premiership 2004

Luke Penny (born 8 February 1981) is a former Australian rules footballer.

Recruited to the Western Bulldogs in the 1998 AFL draft as pick 14, Penny was seen as a project player who could lead the defence in years to come. He stood at 193 cm, and made his debut in 2000. With Matthew Croft at the club, he could not cement his spot at the Bulldogs, so was traded to St Kilda Football Club for pick 17 (which turned out to be Cameron Faulkner) in the 2002 AFL draft.

Making his debut with the Saints in 2003, Penny continued to improve in a key-defensive position, and became first-choice full-back at the club. However, in 2004 and particularly 2005, Penny started having trouble with his knees. In 2005 he played just 9 games and was a figure in the Saints' massive injury list throughout the year. At the end of the 2005 season, Penny's knee injuries had become a massive problem and it was widely known that he was considering retirement. At just 24 years of age, on 29 November, Penny made his retirement official, with 3 years remaining on his contract.
