= Cameron Hunter (footballer) =

Australian rules footballer (born 1984)

Personal information
- Full name: Cameron Hunter
- Born: 30 March 1984 (age 42)
- Original team: Xavier College/Aberfeldie/Calder Cannons
- Draft: 54th overall, 2002 AFL draft
- Height: 186 cm (6 ft 1 in)
- Weight: 72 kg (159 lb)
- Position: Utility

Playing career^{1}
Years	Club	Games (Goals)
2003–2004	Melbourne	2 (0)
- ^{1} Playing statistics correct to the end of 2004.

Cameron Hunter (born 30 March 1984) is a former Australian rules footballer, who briefly played for the Melbourne Football Club in the Australian Football League (AFL), and also played for Sandringham and Box Hill in the Victorian Football League (VFL). He is the son of former Carlton premiership player and All-Australian, Ken Hunter.

== Early life ==
The son of Carlton star, Ken Hunter, he was educated at Xavier College and played his junior football with the Aberfeldie Football Club and also with the Calder Cannons in the TAC Cup. Hunter represented Xavier in football and athletics, once coming second in the Associated Public Schools combined sports' high jump, with a personal best of two metres.

== AFL career ==
=== Draft ===
He was taken with 54th selection in the 2002 National Draft, by the Melbourne Football Club, despite his initial belief that he would not be selected, due to Carlton deciding not to select him with a father–son selection. He was known during his high school playing days for having the same fearlessness and aerial ability as his father, with Melbourne recruiting manager, Craig Cameron, describing him as "a really exciting talent. He can really jump up and mark it. He's got a big engine and is brave in the air". Despite disappointment at not going to his father's old club of Carlton, Hunter was still excited at being selected by Melbourne, saying "it gives me the chance to really do it my own way". Carlton decided against drafting Hunter, despite the fact that his father was Carlton's board at the time, claiming that Hunter was too skinny; ironically the same reason that his father was not selected by Richmond in the early 1980s.

=== Melbourne ===
Hunter began his career at a weight of 64 kg (10 st 1 lb), 5 kg (11 lb) lighter than any other AFL listed player. However, Hunter did begin to bulk up in his first few months and he showed enough form in the VFL, playing for Melbourne's VFL-affiliate Sandringham, to be selected in Melbourne's senior side towards the end of the season, due to Melbourne's poor form. He debuted against the Western Bulldogs in round 18 of the 2003 season and, although only having two possessions, he was selected in the side the next week against Geelong, when he had two handballs, one kick and three tackles. This, however, was to be Hunter's last match at AFL level. Hunter remained on Melbourne's list for the 2004 season and, although he bulked up in the pre-season, he was still one of the lightest players in the AFL, and he failed to play a match for the season. Melbourne then delisted him at the end of the 2004 season. He played with Sandringham for the season, but was dropped from the team on the eve of their Grand Final victory.

== Post-AFL career ==
After being delisted by Melbourne, his affiliation with Sandringham also came to an end and Hunter subsequently joined the Box Hill Hawks Football Club in the VFL for the 2005 season. Hunter spent three seasons at Box Hill and was awarded Box Hill's Most Courageous Player award for the 2006 season. Hunter spent the majority of 2008 overseas and finished off the season playing with the Balwyn Football Club in the Eastern Football League. In 2009, Hunter rejoined Sandringham, and played with them for the 2009 and 2010 seasons.
