= Joel Perry =

Australian rules footballer

Personal information
- Full name: Joel Perry
- Born: 18 June 1985 (age 41)
- Original team: Eastern Ranges
- Height: 196 cm (6 ft 5 in)
- Weight: 100 kg (220 lb)

Playing career^{1}
Years	Club	Games (Goals)
2006	Kangaroos	8 (0)
- ^{1} Playing statistics correct to the end of 2006.

Joel Perry (born 18 June 1985) is a former Australian rules footballer in the Australian Football League.

Perry was drafted from the Eastern Ranges TAC Cup side in the 2002 AFL draft to the Kangaroos. He did not get a look in into the senior lineup until 2005, when he played in the Wizard Cup pre-season competition. Named as an emergency in Round 9 of 2005, he finally made his debut after his fourth year on the Kangaroos' list in Round 2, 2006.

Joel was dropped from the Kangaroos lineup after a very serviceable performance in the Round 15 game against the Brisbane Lions at the Telstra Dome. Perry was unable to force his way back into the side for the remainder of the season.

Perry was officially delisted by the Kangaroos on 17 November 2006. He went on the play state-level football for the Port Adelaide Magpies in the South Australian National Football League, coming runner-up in the club's best and fairest awards twice (in 2007 and 2008) and winning the club's leading goalkicking in 2009.
