= Jason Laycock =

Australian rules footballer

Personal information
- Born: 4 November 1984 (age 41); Devonport, Tasmania
- Original team: East Devonport/Tassie Mariners
- Debut: Round 19, 7 August 2004, Essendon vs. Carlton, at Melbourne Cricket Ground
- Height: 201 cm (6 ft 7 in)
- Weight: 105 kg (231 lb)
- Position: Ruckman

Playing career^{1}
Years	Club	Games (Goals)
2004–2010 2011–2015 2016 2017	Essendon Burnie Dockers Cygnet New Norfolk	58 (36) 96 (113) 15 (42) 17 (32)
- ^{1} Playing statistics correct to the end of 2008.

Jason Laycock (born 4 November 1984) is an Australian rules football player. He played for the Essendon Football Club as a ruckman in the Australian Football League (AFL) from 2004 to 2010. He was drafted by Essendon from East Devonport Football Club with the tenth overall selection in the 2002 National AFL draft.

Laycock was nominated for the NAB AFL Rising Star Medal in round five, 2005 before straining a calf muscle missed the last seven games of that season. In 2006, he suffered knee and foot injuries, which restricted him to six games. Laycock played 19 games in 2007 and a further 16 games in 2008. In 2009, he suffered another foot injury and missed the entire season. He was delisted by Essendon in 2010.

Laycock was recruited by the Burnie Dockers Football Club in the Tasmanian Football League in 2011.

Laycock Played For The Cygnet Football Club in 2016 and the New Norfolk District Football Club In 2017 in the Southern Football League (Tasmania).
