= Adrian Deluca =

Australian rules footballer

Personal information
- Full name: Adrian "Smoke Bomb" De Luca
- Born: 15 May 1982 (age 44)
- Original team: Oakleigh Chargers / Port Melbourne
- Debut: Round 1, 2004, Carlton vs. Fremantle, at Subiaco Oval
- Height: 202 cm (6 ft 8 in)
- Weight: 99 kg (218 lb)

Playing career^{1}
| Years | Club | Games (Goals) |
| 2004–2006 | Carlton | 46 (22) |
- ^{1} Playing statistics correct to the end of 2006.

Career highlights
- Carlton pre-season premiership side 2005

Adrian Deluca (born 15 May 1982) is a former professional Australian rules footballer who played for the Carlton Football Club in the Australian Football League (AFL).

Deluca played TAC Cup football for the Oakleigh Chargers, and also played for Port Melbourne in the Victorian Football League. He was generally played as a marking forward and back-up ruckman. He was then recruited to the AFL as a 21-year-old by Carlton with its seventh round selection in the 2003 AFL National Draft (#72 overall). He made his debut for Carlton in round 1, 2004 against Fremantle. After three seasons and 46 games at AFL level, Deluca announced his retirement from AFL at the end of the 2006 season.

His younger brother, Fabian, played with Port Adelaide from 2006 to 2008, and played alongside Adrian at Port Melbourne for part of his career.
