= Cameron Faulkner =

Australian rules footballer, born 1984

Personal information
- Born: 22 May 1984 (age 42)
- Original team: Central District (SANFL)
- Debut: Round 6, 1 May 2004, Western Bulldogs vs. Kangaroos, at Manuka Oval
- Height: 179 cm (5 ft 10 in)
- Weight: 81 kg (179 lb)

Playing career^{1}
Years	Club	Games (Goals)
2004–2007	Western Bulldogs	18 (9)
- ^{1} Playing statistics correct to the end of 2007.

Cameron Faulkner (born 22 May 1984) is a former professional Australian rules footballer who played with the Western Bulldogs.

Faulkner was recruited to through the 2002 National AFL Draft at number 17 which had been traded by St Kilda for Luke Penny.

In season 2005 he played the first four games, but was dropped thereafter and did not return until round 12. He broke his collarbone in round 15 against Fremantle which put him out for the rest of the season. He played in only three games in the 2006 season, with a shoulder injury in a Round 10 VFL match further hampering his attempts to earn selection.

The 2006 Record describes Faulkner as an exciting and quick small forward/midfielder (he is only 170 cm tall). Faulkner plays in number 18. He was delisted at the end of the 2007 AFL season after playing only one game for the year.

After returning to his SANFL club, Central District, for a year, he is now playing for the East Roxby Roos in Roxby Downs SA.( as a coach/player )
