= Josh Thewlis (Australian footballer) =

Australian rules footballer

Personal information
- Full name: Josh Thewlis
- Born: 20 July 1984 (age 42)
- Original teams: Donald, Bendigo Pioneers (TAC Cup)
- Draft: No. 50, 2002 AFL draft

Playing career^{1}
Years	Club	Games (Goals)
2004	Sydney	2 (0)
- ^{1} Playing statistics correct to the end of 2012.

Josh Thewlis (born 20 July 1984) is a former Australian rules footballer who played with Sydney in the Australian Football League (AFL).

Originally from the Victorian country town of Donald, Thewlis played with the Bendigo Pioneers in the elite junior championship the TAC Cup before being drafted at number 50 by Sydney at the 2002 AFL draft. Thewlis made his senior debut against Collingwood in the 2004 AFL season.

He only played two games for Sydney, before he was delisted at the end of the 2004 season. However, he was recruited in the 2005 Rookie Draft by North Melbourne, but did not make his senior debut for them before he was delisted at the end of the 2005 season.

After leaving the AFL, he continued to play football for South Adelaide in the South Australian National Football League, where he was included in the SANFL Team of the Year in 2011.
