= Damien Adkins =

Australian rules footballer

Personal information
- Nicknames: Chipper, Spud
- Born: 9 March 1981 (age 45); Nathalia
- Original team: MDU / Leongatha / Gippsland U18
- Debut: Round 1, 13 March 2000, Collingwood vs. Hawthorn, at the MCG
- Height: 181 cm (5 ft 11 in)
- Weight: 73 kg (161 lb)
- Position: Midfield/Forward

Playing career^{1}
Years	Club	Games (Goals)
2000–2002	Collingwood	22 (8)
2003–2006	West Coast	32 (24)
Total		54 (32)
- ^{1} Playing statistics correct to the end of 2006.

Career highlights
- AFL Rising Star nominee 2000

Damien Adkins (born 9 March 1981) is an Australian rules footballer formerly with the Collingwood and West Coast Eagles Football Clubs in the AFL.

== Collingwood ==
Adkins was drafted by Collingwood with pick 50 in the 1998 AFL draft. He played his first game for Collingwood in round 1, 2000. Adkins won a Rising Star nomination after collecting 19 disposals and kicking 2 goals in his third game, a match against Carlton in round 3, 2000.

Adkins played 18 of a possible 22 games in his debut season. However, injury and form saw Adkins play only 4 games between 2001 and 2002.

== West Coast ==
After the 2002 season, Adkins was traded to the West Coast Eagles in return for Andrew Williams. Adkins played 32 games, including an elimination final, for the Eagles between 2003 and 2005. Adkins, for the second time in his career, missed selection for an AFL Grand Final when West Coast made the 2005 Grand Final.

== Frankston VFL ==
Once Adkins left the Eagles at the end of 2006, he returned to Victoria to play in the VFL for Frankston, unfortunately the injury that ended his AFL career and the subsequent surgery was unsuccessful and he required further surgery and never made the field for Frankston.

== Meeniyan Dumbalk United ==
After a couple of seasons in the VAFA with Collegians, Adkins return to his home football club MDU in 2010 where he played for a number of seasons with his mates.
