= Barnaby French =

Australian rules footballer

Personal information
- Born: 25 November 1975 (age 50)
- Original team: Ironbank
- Height: 200 cm (6 ft 7 in)
- Weight: 102 kg (225 lb)

Playing career^{1}
Years	Club	Games (Goals)
1999–2002	Port Adelaide	62 (20)
2003–2006	Carlton	71 (20)
Total		133 (40)
- ^{1} Playing statistics correct to the end of 2006.

Barnaby French (born 25 November 1975) is a former professional Australian rules footballer.

French attended Pembroke School in Adelaide. A champion junior rower, French was a member of the Australian under 23s rowing team. He gave up rowing when his studies interfered.

After rowing, French played local football for Ironbank in the Adelaide regional Hills Football League from 1996 to 1997. Despite having relatively little junior experience as a footballer, French won the club best and fairest both years, and was impressive enough to be drafted by Port Adelaide Football Club as a rookie at the 1997 AFL draft.

French spent the 1998 AFL season playing for South Australian National Football League (SANFL) club Sturt. He was also selected in the SANFL representative team that season.

Port Adelaide elevated French to its senior list for 1999 and he made his AFL debut as a 23-year-old, playing 62 games and kick 20 goals for the club. However, French was generally the club's number three or four ruckman behind Matthew Primus, Dean Brogan and Brendon Lade, at the time, and this limited his opportunities with Port. French continued to play SANFL football with Sturt when not selected for Port Adelaide, winning a SANFL premiership in 2002.

At the end of the 2002 AFL season, French was traded to the Carlton Football Club in exchange for a second-round draft selection (#16 overall). There, he took the position of number one ruckman, and proved weekly to be one of Carlton's most important players. French spent four seasons at Carlton, but as time went on he began to struggle to keep his place in the team. French announced his retirement at three quarter time of the Blues' Round 22, 2006 match against the Sydney Swans, which they lost by 92 points.
