= Stuart Cochrane =

Australian rules footballer

Personal information
- Full name: Stuart Cochrane
- Born: 20 July 1978 (age 48)
- Original team: Central District
- Height: 189 cm (6 ft 2 in)
- Weight: 88 kg (194 lb)

Playing career^{1}
Years	Club	Games (Goals)
1998–2002	Kangaroos	50 (11)
2003–2005	Port Adelaide	54 (6)
Total		104 (17)
- ^{1} Playing statistics correct to the end of 2005.

Stuart Cochrane (born 20 July 1978) is a former Australian Football League (AFL) and South Australian National Football League (SANFL) footballer who played for the North Melbourne, Port Adelaide and Central District Football Clubs.

After being delisted at the end of 2005, Cochrane played for Central District in the SANFL before retiring from football after playing in a losing 2006 Grand Final side. He is currently part of Port Adelaide's coaching staff, serving as the club's development coach at AFL level, and as the club's defence coach at SANFL level.

Cochrane's father Richard Cochrane also played for Central District, and his sons Tom and Dougie were both drafted by Port Adelaide.

He is an Indigenous Australian descended from the Ngunawal people.
