= Damian Cupido =

Australian rules footballer, born 1982

Personal information
- Born: 11 March 1982 (age 44); Witbank, South Africa
- Original team: Croydon/Eastern Ranges (TAC Cup)
- Debut: Round 11, 2000, Brisbane Lions vs. Sydney Swans, at Sydney Cricket Ground
- Height: 184 cm (6 ft 0 in)
- Weight: 95 kg (209 lb)

Playing career^{1}
| Years | Club | Games (Goals) |
| 2000–2002 | Brisbane Lions | 13 (16) |
| 2003–2005 | Essendon | 40 (50) |
| Total | | 53 (66) |
- ^{1} Playing statistics correct to the end of 2005.

Career highlights
- AFL Rising Star nominee 2001; AFLQ premiership player: 2001

Damian Cupido (born 11 March 1982) is a former professional Australian rules footballer who played for the Brisbane Lions and Essendon Football Club in the Australian Football League (AFL).

== AFL career ==
Cupido began his career at the Brisbane Lions in 2000, and after arriving in Australia from South Africa, made it to the elite level of Australian rules football (the AFL). Cupido received an AFL Rising Star nomination in 2001. He also played Brisbane's reserves team in the winning 2001 AFLQ State League Grand Final.

He did not play a game in 2002 due to a shoulder injury that required surgery and long rehabilitation. Cupido was traded by the Brisbane Lions to Essendon in exchange for Blake Caracella.

In 2003, Cupid had his best year, he booted 40 goals for the season in his small/medium forward role and was a very exciting and at times dominant player. The 2004 year had Cupido suffering for most of the year with a knee injury. It was hoped he could bounce back in 2005, but it turned out he could not. Cupido had noticeably gained weight suffered a public blast from coach Kevin Sheedy in the media, and Cupido was not only dropped to the Bendigo Bombers in the VFL, but one level further, to the Bendigo reserves team. Eventually he fought his way back into the Essendon side but never looked like recapturing his form. At the end of the 2005 season, Cupido was delisted from the Bombers.

== SANFL career ==
Cupido continued his football career in the SANFL with South Adelaide Football Club in the 2006 season, hoping to get a second chance in the AFL via the 2007 Pre-season draft. He did not get picked in the draft after his first season and left South Adelaide to play for West Adelaide, where he was the club's leading goal scorer in 2007. In 2009, Cupido was stood down from West Adelaide to deal with a gambling problem. He played a total of 72 games in the SANFL; 51 with West Adelaide and 21 with South Adelaide.

== Itinerant player ==
In 2010, Cupido was recruited to North Albury Football Club in the Ovens and Murray Football League. After spending a year travelling each week up to Albury to play, Cupido decided to return to his junior club Croydon in the Eastern Football Netball League. After a season and a half, he crossed to Mt Evelyn. It was at Croydon that he had a contact with a player from the Northern Territory and he went north for the wet season. In 2013 Cupido kicked a Northern Territory record of 140 goals for a season. He backed up his goalkicking by kicking a century for Ouyen United in the Sunraysia league a few months later. After his success at Ouyen he coached Murray Football League club Rumbalara to the 2014 premiership while kicking 86 goals. He added another 78 goals the following year. In 2016, he was appointed coach of Airport West but left after four games, he was cleared to Bacchus Marsh for the rest of the year and was part of their premiership team in the Ballarat football league. He had a permit to play a game for Henty in the Hume Football League. In 2017 he played half a season with Bairnsdale before ending the year with East Burwood. In 2018 he kicked 114 goals playing for Henty while also playing a permit game for Undera. In 2019 he again played for Henty while also playing a permit game for Moyhu.

At the age of 39, after a season off because of the COVID pandemic, he played for Brocklesby/Burrumbuttock in the Hume FL. He celebrated his 40th birthday by kicking 105 goals for Girgarre in the Kyabram DFL in 2022. In 2023, he played for Murrabit in the Golden Rivers Football League.
