= Tassie Mariners =

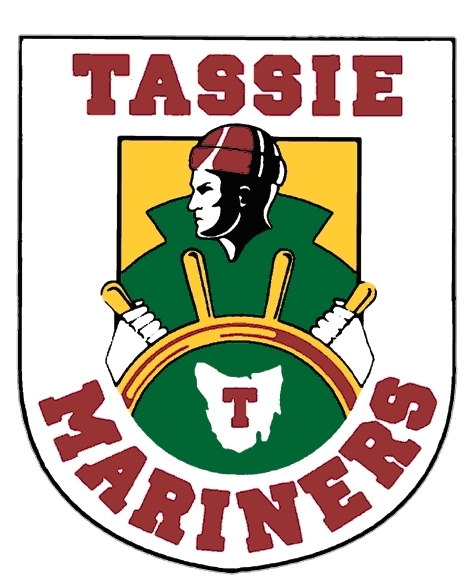

Names
- Full name: Tassie Mariners
- Nickname: Mariners

Club details
- Founded: 1995
- Dissolved: 2016
- Colours: Green; Yellow; Maroon
- Competition: TAC Cup
- Grounds: Bellerive Oval
- York Park
- Former ground: North Hobart Oval

Uniforms
Home

The Tassie Mariners is an under-18 Australian rules football club representing the state of Tasmania. They currently play in the AFL Under 18 Championships and also played in the Victorian statewide under-18s competition (then known as the TAC Cup) from 1995 until 2016.

In the late 2000’s the Tassie Mariners had returned to the boys competition as an "academy team" before graduating to full-time status as the Tasmania Devils Academy in the 2019 season. The girls team began competing as an "academy team" in 2019 before becoming a full-time team in the 2021 season.

== See also ==
- Tasmania Devils (AFL team)
- Tasmania Devils (under-18s team)
- Tasmanian Devils (2001–2008)
