= List of AFL debuts in 2005 =

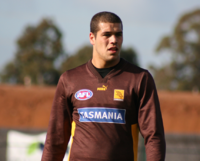
Lance Franklin made his AFL debut in 2005.

This is a listing of Australian rules footballers who made their senior debut for an Australian Football League (AFL) club in 2005.

The statistics refer only to a player's career with the club mentioned.

== Debuts ==
Name	Club	Age at debut	Round debuted	Games (to end of 2014)	Goals (to end of 2014)	Notes
Chris Knights	Adelaide	18 years, 288 days	15	75	55	
Scott Thompson	Adelaide	22 years, 20 days	2	225	133	Previously played for Melbourne.
Nathan van Berlo	Adelaide	18 years, 308 days	3	182	64	
Jayden Attard	Brisbane Lions	19 years, 48 days	4	5	1	
Travis Baird	Brisbane Lions	19 years, 13 days	19	2	1	
Josh Drummond	Brisbane Lions	22 years, 25 days	8	94	35	
Tom Logan	Brisbane Lions	19 years, 274 days	2	3	0	
Daniel Merrett	Brisbane Lions	20 years, 111 days	2	171	69	
Matthew Moody	Brisbane Lions	19 years, 219 days	6	34	14	
Leigh Ryswyk	Brisbane Lions	20 years, 139 days	11	1	0	
Troy Selwood	Brisbane Lions	20 years, 327 days	1	75	11	
Justin Sherman	Brisbane Lions	18 years, 80 days	4	114	85	
Llane Spaanderman	Brisbane Lions	19 years, 79 days	6	3	1	
Cameron Wood	Brisbane Lions	18 years, 51 days	5	16	0	
Eddie Betts	Carlton	18 years, 120 days	1	120	165	
Chris Bryan	Carlton	23 years, 90 days	11	16	9	
Callum Chambers	Carlton	25 years, 148 days	4	12	3	Previously played for West Coast.
Troy Longmuir	Carlton	25 years, 324 days	4	11	10	Previously played for Melbourne and Fremantle. Brother of Justin Longmuir.
Setanta Ó hAilpín	Carlton	22 years, 50 days	7	72	56	
Jordan Russell	Carlton	18 years, 246 days	15	93	15	
Blake Caracella	Collingwood	28 years, 13 days	1	27	34	Previously played for Essendon and Brisbane.
Travis Cloke	Collingwood	18 years, 51 days	5	216	390	Brother of Cameron and Jason Cloke. Son of David Cloke.
Ben Davies	Collingwood	19 years, 87 days	7	12	1	
Chris Egan	Collingwood	18 years, 201 days	8	27	22	
David Fanning	Collingwood	20 years, 251 days	1	14	4	
Brent Hall	Collingwood	19 years, 189 days	16	1	0	
Adam Iacobucci	Collingwood	19 years, 104 days	6	4	0	
Heritier Lumumba	Collingwood	18 years, 258 days	18	199	28	
Sean Rusling	Collingwood	18 years, 234 days	10	17	19	
Heath Shaw	Collingwood	19 years, 237 days	17	173	37	Brother of Rhyce Shaw. Son of Ray Shaw and nephew of Tony Shaw.
Tristan Cartledge	Essendon	19 years, 294 days	2	7	1	
Courtney Johns	Essendon	20 years, 237 days	15	21	18	
Andrew Lovett	Essendon	22 years, 150 days	3	88	83	
Angus Monfries	Essendon	18 years, 66 days	1	150	165	
Jay Nash	Essendon	19 years, 206 days	16	43	10	
Henry Slattery	Essendon	19 years, 153 days	13	96	12	
Paul Thomas	Essendon	22 years, 345 days	4	8	1	2004 Magarey Medalist.
Ryan Crowley	Fremantle	21 years, 84 days	10	188	116	
Michael Johnson	Fremantle	20 years, 179 days	4	190	62	
David Mundy	Fremantle	19 years, 284 days	6	210	82	
Brett Peake	Fremantle	21 years, 349 days	13	75	42	Son of Brian Peake
Nathan Ablett	Geelong	19 years, 243 days	20	32	46	Brother of Gary Ablett, Jr. and son of Gary Ablett Sr.
Mark Blake	Geelong	19 years, 303 days	1	99	12	
Matthew Egan	Geelong	21 years, 260 days	1	59	1	
Tom Lonergan	Geelong	21 years, 5 days	9	145	52	
Cameron Thurley	Geelong	23 years, 162 days	7	7	12	
Tim Boyle	Hawthorn	21 years, 140 days	13	31	39	
Zac Dawson	Hawthorn	19 years, 180 days	21	14	0	
Lance Franklin	Hawthorn	18 years, 56 days	1	182	580	
Jordan Lewis	Hawthorn	18 years, 351 days	3	217	124	
Harry Miller	Hawthorn	19 years, 289 days	1	18	13	
Thomas Murphy	Hawthorn	19 years, 161 days	22	49	3	
Jarryd Roughead	Hawthorn	18 years, 77 days	3	207	441	
Simon Taylor	Hawthorn	22 years, 235 days	3	85	16	
Josh Thurgood	Hawthorn	19 years, 295 days	1	13	1	
Clinton Young	Hawthorn	19 years, 151 days	16	116	60	
Chris Johnson	Melbourne	19 years, 109 days	8	31	2	
Paul Johnson	Melbourne	20 years, 314 days	7	68	20	Previously played for West Coast.
Brent Moloney	Melbourne	21 years, 57 days	1	122	31	Previously played for Geelong.
Shannon Motlop	Melbourne	26 years, 248 days	5	10	5	Previously played for North Melbourne. Brother of Daniel and Steven Motlop.
Shane Harvey	Kangaroos	21 years, 196 days	16	3	4	Brother of Brent Harvey. Previously played for Essendon.
Brent LeCras	Kangaroos	23 years, 222 days	9	6	1	Brother of Mark LeCras.
Hamish McIntosh	Kangaroos	20 years, 238 days	6	107	59	
Justin Perkins	Kangaroos	22 years, 135 days	9	4	0	
Lance Picioane	Kangaroos	24 years, 292 days	1	15	2	Previously played for Adelaide and Hawthorn.
Daniel Pratt	Kangaroos	22 years, 5 days	1	1116	9	Previously played for Brisbane.
Jesse W. Smith	Kangaroos	18 years, 227 days	8	27	3	Son of Ross W. Smith.
Nathan Thompson	Kangaroos	27 years, 40 days	1	60	135	Previously played for Hawthorn.
David Trotter	Kangaroos	19 years, 149 days	18	7	2	
Brett Deledio	Richmond	17 years, 343 days	1	214	146	
Nathan Foley	Richmond	19 years, 261 days	10	154	44	
Mark Graham	Richmond	32 years, 14 days	1	20	2	Previously played for Hawthorn.
Trent Knobel	Richmond	24 years, 308 days	1	21	4	Previously played for Brisbane and St Kilda.
Danny Meyer	Richmond	18 years, 271 days	6	17	7	
Adam Pattison	Richmond	19 years, 71 days	1	61	15	
Troy Simmonds	Richmond	26 years, 257 days	1	93	66	Previously played for Melbourne and Fremantle.
Richard Tambling	Richmond	18 years, 231 days	6	108	61	
Will Thursfield	Richmond	19 years, 74 days	14	53	0	
Ben Eckermann	Port Adelaide	18 years, 57 days	7	4	0	
Stephen Gilham	Port Adelaide	20 years, 332 days	18	1	0	
Danyle Pearce	Port Adelaide	19 years, 115 days	18	115	67	
Aaron Shattock	Port Adelaide	24 years, 382 days	1	11	1	Previously played for Brisbane.
Adam Thomson	Port Adelaide	18 years, 288 days	11	28	16	
Peter Walsh	Port Adelaide	28 years, 245 days	1	35	6	Previously played for Melbourne.
Cain Ackland	St Kilda	23 years, 8 days	1	41	18	Previously played for Port Adelaide.
Aaron Fiora	St Kilda	22 years, 339 days	1	62	33	Previously played for Richmond.
James Gwilt	St Kilda	19 years, 16 days	22	67	19	
Mark McGough	St Kilda	20 years, 275 days	1	12	2	Previously played for Collingwood.
Andrew McQualter	St Kilda	18 years, 339 days	8	84	37	
Sean Dempster	Sydney	21 years, 79 days	3	54	8	
Darren Jolly	Sydney	23 years, 141 days	1	118	59	Previously played for Melbourne.
Nick Malceski	Sydney	20 years, 293 days	11	92	42	
Jarred Moore	Sydney	19 years, 62 days	7	65	51	
David Spriggs	Sydney	24 years, 74 days	3	5	0	Previously played for Geelong.
Luke Vogels	Sydney	21 years, 334 days	7	17	11	
Aaron Edwards	West Coast	21 years, 94 days	11	4	2	
Jaymie Graham	West Coast	22 years, 62 days	3	37	13	
Mark LeCras	West Coast	18 years, 272 days	10	78	187	Brother of Brent LeCras.
Daniel McConnell	West Coast	18 years, 327 days	8	2	0	
Mitch Morton	West Coast	18 years, 190 days	19	12	11	
Matt Rosa	West Coast	18 years, 243 days	17	90	25	
Tyson Stenglein	West Coast	24 years, 254 days	1	102	25	Previously played for Adelaide.
Ryan Griffen	Footscray	18 years, 263 days	4	121	74	
Dale Morris	Footscray	22 years, 115 days	5	133	2	
Tim Walsh	Footscray	20 years, 0 days	8	1	1	
Cameron Wight	Footscray	20 years, 39 days	8	36	6	
