= 2006 Collingwood Football Club season =

Collingwood Football Club
2006 season
- President: Eddie McGuire
- Coach: Michael Malthouse
- Captain: Nathan Buckley
- Home ground: MCG
- Pre-season competition: Second round
- AFL season: 5th
- Finals series: Elimination final
- Best and Fairest: Alan Didak
- Leading goalkicker: Anthony Rocca (55)

This article covers the 2006 season of the Collingwood Football Club, a team in the Australian Football League (AFL).

== Season events ==
Pre-season

- Shane Woewodin is delisted by Collingwood. Woewodin was a former Brownlow Medallist in 2000 whilst playing for Melbourne. He was not picked up by a club in the Pre-Season draft.
- Collingwood attends a high-altitude training camp in Arizona, United States for two weeks.
- Dale Thomas is picked up by Collingwood at No. 2 in the 2005 NAB Draft.

February

- President Eddie McGuire has been appointed CEO of the Nine Network. He had to give up as host on several TV shows, but remained as president of the club, despite having to live in Sydney.
- Sean Rusling injures his shoulder on the Community Camp in Northern Sydney. He is expected to miss around 2 months of action.
- Collingwood wins first game of the NAB Cup against St Kilda in fine style, winning in extra time. Fraser Gehrig missed a shot on goal after the siren to draw the match, therefore, as a knockout competition winner was decided in extra time.

March

- Captain Nathan Buckley plays his first game of the year during a NAB Challenge match played at Princes Park.
- Rookie Harry O'Brien is promoted to the senior list for the injured Sean Rusling
- Six players were inducted into the club's Hall of Fame. They were Charlie Pannam, Darren Millane, Harold Rumney, Des Healy, Billy Picken and Mick McGuane.

April

- No. 2 draft pick Dale Thomas makes his debut against Adelaide at Telstra Dome. Collingwood lose by 34 points.
- Collingwood win their first game of the year in Round 2 against Hawthorn.
- Dale Thomas receives the Round 2 AFL Rising Star nomination.
- Collingwood defeat Essendon in the annual Anzac Day clash, in front of more than 92,000 fans in the return to the Melbourne Cricket Ground.
- Ben Johnson wins the Anzac Day Medal for best on ground.
- Chad Morrison was fined $20,000 by the club for drink driving, where the club's sponsorship with the TAC came under fire.

May

- Heath Shaw receives the Round 5 AFL Rising Star nomination.
- Collingwood sit first on the ladder after a Round 6 victory over Carlton.
- The club is fined a massive $200,000 by the TAC after the Morrison incident.
- Collingwood beat Geelong by 102 points in Round 8 at the MCG.
- Rhyce Shaw makes his comeback to the side after his season ending knee injury in 2005.

June

- Scott Pendlebury makes his debut against the Brisbane Lions at the MCG.
- Blake Caracella suffers a career-ending neck injury, sustained in a clash with Brisbane Lions player Tim Notting. Experts said he was lucky not to become a quadriplegic.
- Collingwood beat reigning premiers Sydney at Telstra Stadium. It would be the first of a current 10-match winning streak against them.

July

- Dual best and fairest Paul Licuria is 'rested' for the match against West Coast. Collingwood wins convincingly, avenging defeat in Round 7.
- Goal-sneak Leon Davis fractures his left ankle.
- Chris Tarrant and Ben Johnson involved in brawl outside a Port Melbourne hotel, leaving one man in injured.

August

- Chris Tarrant and Ben Johnson are fined $5000 by the club for breaking team rules.
- Blake Caracella announces his retirement, coming after his neck injury sustained in Round 10.
- Sam Iles makes his debut against Adelaide at AAMI Stadium.
- Collingwood loses against bottom-placed Essendon in Round 19 – thus giving them the ignominy of being the only Victorian team to lose to the Bombers during the 2006 season. This loss would cost Collingwood a top four position at the end of the season. Collingwood had already won the earlier ANZAC Day match.
- A bronze statue in the honour of Bob Rose is revealed outside the Lexus Centre.
- Forward Alan Didak receives excess media attention, after he was kicked out of a club for a dispute with his girlfriend.
- Alan Didak kicks the winning goal with seconds remaining against Port Adelaide at AAMI Stadium.
- Alan Didak makes a controversial bump on former teammate Heath Scotland. The tribunal throws the case out.
- Chad Morrison retires.

September

- Heath Shaw finishes third in the AFL Rising Star.
- Collingwood finish 7th, after being defeated by the Western Bulldogs in the first elimination final.
- Brodie Holland is suspended for 6 weeks after a hit on Brett Montgomery in the elimination final. Holland's appeal fails.
- Alan Didak wins his first All-Australian selection.

October

- Alan Didak wins the Copeland Trophy from James Clement and Ben Johnson, coming sooner than 24 hours after he was involved in an incident with a taxi driver.
- Collingwood trades Chris Tarrant to Fremantle in exchange for Paul Medhurst and a first-round draft pick.
- Collingwood delist Cameron Cloke, Jason Cloke, David Fanning, Brent Hall, Adam Iacobucci and Julian Rowe.

November

- The club re-visits Arizona for another pre-season high-altitude camp.
- Tristen Walker is delisted by the club, the seventh player chopped.

== Playing list changes ==
Nathan Buckley was captain; his seventh season as the skipper of the Pies. Collingwood had delisted several players last season, including Brownlow Medallist Shane Woewodin, and traded Richard Cole to Essendon. They had picked up several young players, including priority/first round draftees Dale Thomas and Scott Pendlebury in the 2005 NAB Draft. With the high number of senior players departed in 2005, both Ben Davies and David Fanning got elevated to the senior list.

== Squad ==
=== Senior list ===
| Name | No. | Height | Weight | Birth Date | Debut | Previous clubs | 2006 Games | Career Games | 2006 Goals | Career Goals |
|---|---|---|---|---|---|---|---|---|---|---|
| Jack Anthony | 31 | 191 | 85 | 19 January 1982 | **** | Diamond Creek, Northern U18 | 0 | 0 | 0 | 0 |
| Nathan Buckley | 5 | 186 | 91 | 26 July 1972 | 1993 | Southern Dists (NT)/Port Adel (SANFL)/Bris | 21 | 275 | 26 | 282 |
| Scott Burns | 17 | 181 | 85 | 23 December 1974 | 1995 | Norwood (SA) | 20 | 222 | 11 | 132 |
| Blake Caracella | 10 | 186 | 85 | 15 March 1977 | 1997 | St Marys (VMFL)/Northern U18/Ess/Bris | 6 | 187 | 0 | 218 |
| James Clement | 8 | 190 | 95 | 4 September 1976 | 1996 | South Fremantle (WA)/Fremantle | 23 | 217 | 2 | 49 |
| Cameron Cloke | 33 | 195 | 98 | 20 December 1984 | 2004 | Park Orchards/Eastern U18 | 2 | 21 | 0 | 11 |
| Jason Cloke | 34 | 189 | 90 | 6 June 1982 | 2002 | Park Orchards/Eastern U18 | 7 | 76 | 0 | 10 |
| Travis Cloke | 32 | 195 | 95 | 5 March 1987 | 2005 | Park Orchards/Eastern U18 | 15 | 30 | 6 | 15 |
| Ryan Cook | 29 | 186 | 78 | 16 February 1988 | **** | Rosebud/Dandenong U18 | 0 | 0 | 0 | 0 |
| Benjamin Davies | 19 | 187 | 81 | 10 February 1986 | 2005 | Williamstown/Western U18 | 5 | 12 | 1 | 1 |
| Leon Davis | 1 | 178 | 80 | 17 June 1981 | 2000 | Perth (WA) | 15 | 115 | 23 | 138 |
| Alan Didak | 4 | 182 | 84 | 15 February 1983 | 2001 | Port Adelaide (SANFL) | 23 | 102 | 41 | 146 |
| Chris Egan | 15 | 187 | 81 | 26 October 1986 | 2005 | Rumbalara/Murray U18 | 11 | 24 | 14 | 21 |
| David Fanning | 30 | 204 | 97 | 20 July 1984 | 2005 | Aberfeldie | 1 | 14 | 0 | 4 |
| Josh Fraser | 25 | 202 | 99 | 5 January 1982 | 2000 | Mansfield/Murray U18 | 23 | 136 | 16 | 120 |
| Brent Hall | 40 | 198 | 97 | 7 January 1986 | 2005 | South Fremantle (WAFL) | 0 | 1 | 0 | 0 |
| Brodie Holland | 6 | 180 | 80 | 3 January 1980 | 1998 | Glenorchy/Tas U18/Fremantle | 17 | 147 | 15 | 141 |
| Adam Iacobucci | 38 | 180 | 83 | 17 January 1986 | 2005 | St Bernards/Calder U18 | 1 | 4 | 0 | 0 |
| Sam Iles | 37 | 183 | 76 | 19 June 1987 | 2006 | Clarence/Tas U18/Tas VFL | 4 | 4 | 0 | 0 |
| Ben Johnson | 26 | 183 | 82 | 5 April 1981 | 2000 | St Marys (VMFL)/Preston U18 | 23 | 136 | 10 | 32 |
| Paul Licuria | 18 | 179 | 82 | 4 January 1978 | 1997 | Keon Park/Northern U18/Sydney | 21 | 181 | 14 | 69 |
| Tarkyn Lockyer | 24 | 178 | 79 | 30 October 1979 | 1999 | East Fremantle (WA) | 23 | 142 | 13 | 77 |
| Ryan Lonie | 3 | 190 | 87 | 4 March 1983 | 2001 | Frankston Bombers/Dandenong U18 | 22 | 118 | 12 | 61 |
| Nick Maxwell | 27 | 190 | 88 | 3 June 1983 | 2004 | St Josephs (VCFL)/Geel U18/Nth Ballarat | 17 | 47 | 2 | 8 |
| Chad Morrison | 7 | 184 | 83 | 29 March 1978 | 1996 | Dandenong/Southern U18/West Coast | 6 | 169 | 0 | 88 |
| Shane O'Bree | 11 | 180 | 83 | 15 March 1979 | 1998 | Beaufort/North Ballarat U18/Brisbane | 23 | 168 | 9 | 68 |
| Scott Pendlebury | 16 | 190 | 82 | 7 January 1988 | 2006 | Sale/Gippsland U18 | 9 | 9 | 4 | 4 |
| Simon Prestigiacomo | 35 | 193 | 94 | 31 January 1978 | 1996 | Research/Northern U18 | 19 | 179 | 0 | 3 |
| Guy Richards | 21 | 201 | 95 | 21 March 1983 | 2004 | Coldstream/Eastern U18 | 9 | 23 | 0 | 3 |
| Anthony Rocca | 23 | 195 | 106 | 15 August 1977 | 1995 | Reservoir-Lakeside/Northern U18/Sydney | 23 | 207 | 55 | 341 |
| Julian Rowe | 9 | 187 | 80 | 25 May 1985 | 2004 | Old Carey/Oakleigh U18 | 2 | 26 | 0 | 8 |
| Sean Rusling | 2 | 190 | 89 | 6 October 1986 | 2005 | West Adelaide (SA) | 5 | 11 | 6 | 9 |
| Heath Shaw | 39 | 181 | 80 | 27 November 1985 | 2005 | Diamond Creek/Northern U18 | 22 | 28 | 9 | 10 |
| Rhyce Shaw | 22 | 180 | 84 | 16 October 1981 | 2000 | Diamond Creek/Northern U18 | 9 | 60 | 3 | 12 |
| Danny Stanley | 28 | 186 | 90 | 18 February 1988 | **** | Ocean Grove/Geelong U18 | 0 | 0 | 0 | 0 |
| Dane Swan | 36 | 183 | 85 | 25 February 1984 | 2003 | Westmeadows/Calder U18 | 21 | 51 | 19 | 24 |
| Chris Tarrant | 20 | 193 | 92 | 18 September 1980 | 1998 | South Mildura/Bendigo U18 | 20 | 161 | 39 | 299 |
| Dale Thomas | 13 | 183 | 76 | 21 June 1987 | 2006 | Drouin/Gippsland U18 | 16 | 16 | 10 | 10 |
| Shane Wakelin | 14 | 191 | 92 | 12 August 1974 | 1994 | Port Adelaide (SANFL)/St Kilda | 13 | 215 | 0 | 19 |
| Tristen Walker | 12 | 195 | 100 | 11 April 1984 | 2003 | Claremont (WA) | 0 | 28 | 0 | 8 |

=== Rookie List ===
| Name | No. | Height | Weight | Birth Date | Debut | Previous clubs | 2006 Games | Career Games | 2006 Goals | Career Goals |
|---|---|---|---|---|---|---|---|---|---|---|
| Shannon Cox | 44 | 190 | 90 | 7 March 1986 | **** | South Fremantle (WA) | 0 | 0 | 0 | 0 |
| Daniel Nicholls | 45 | 176 | 67 | 2 March 1987 | **** | Rowville/Dandenong U18 | 0 | 0 | 0 | 0 |
| Harry O'Brien | 43 | 187 | 85 | 15 November 1986 | 2005 | Claremont (WA) | 9 | 13 | 0 | 1 |
| Alan Toovey | 41 | 189 | 79 | 23 March 1987 | **** | Claremont (WA) | 0 | 0 | 0 | 0 |
| Bryan Strauchan | 59 | 180 | 89 | 10 October 1983 | **** | Horsham | 0 | 0 | 0 | 0 |

=== Arrivals ===
- Rookie elevation
1. Ben Davies
2. David Fanning
- 2005 NAB Draft
1. Jack Anthony
2. Ryan Cook
3. Scott Pendlebury
4. Danny Stanley
5. Dale Thomas
- NAB AFL Pre-Season Draft
1. Sam Iles

=== Departures ===
- Traded
1. Richard Cole (to Essendon)
- Delisted
1. Tom Davidson
2. David King
3. Matthew Lokan
4. Billy Morrison
5. Brayden Shaw
6. Andrew Williams
7. Shane Woewodin

== Pre-season ==
=== NAB Cup ===
| Match | Date | Local Time | Collingwood's Score | Opponent | Their Score | Home/Away | Venue | Result | Margin |
|---|---|---|---|---|---|---|---|---|---|
| 7 | 26 February | 4:40 p.m. | 2.8.8 (74) | St Kilda | 1.9.10 (73) | Home | Telstra Dome | W | 1 |
| QF | 4 March | 5:10 p.m. | 2.10.6 (84) | Fremantle | 0.15.10 (100) | Away | Subiaco | L | 16 |

=== NAB Challenge ===
| Date | Local Time | Opponent | Home/Away | Venue | Result |
|---|---|---|---|---|---|
| 11 March | 11:30 a.m. | Kangaroos | Home | Princes Park | W |
| 18 March | TBA | Brisbane Lions | Away | Carrara | L |

== Home and away season ==
| Round | Date | Local Time | Collingwood's Score | Opponent | Their Score | Won/Lost | Margin | Home/Away | Venue |
|---|---|---|---|---|---|---|---|---|---|
| 1 | 3 April | 7:10 p.m. | 12.5 (77) | Adelaide | 17.9 (111) | Lost | 34 | Home | Telstra Dome |
| 2 | 9 April | 2:10 p.m. | 18.11 (119) | Hawthorn | 12.12 (84) | Won | 35 | Away | Telstra Dome |
| 3 | 17 April | 2:10 p.m. | 23.15 (153) | Kangaroos | 11.10 (76) | Won | 77 | Away | Telstra Dome |
| 4 | 25 April | 2:40 p.m. | 15.16 (106) | Essendon | 12.17 (89) | Won | 17 | Home | MCG |
| 5 | 30 April | 2:10 p.m. | 18.12 (120) | Port Adelaide | 11.13 (79) | Won | 41 | Home | Telstra Dome |
| 6 | 7 May | 2:10 p.m. | 21.12 (138) | Carlton | 9.12 (66) | Won | 72 | Away | MCG |
| 7 | 13 May | 5:40 p.m. | 15.8 (98) | West Coast Eagles | 16.16 (112) | Lost | 14 | Away | Subiaco |
| 8 | 20 May | 7:10 p.m. | 22.14 (146) | Geelong | 6.8 (44) | Won | 102 | Home | MCG |
| 9 | 26 May | 7:40 p.m. | 21.13 (139) | Western Bulldogs | 16.9 (105) | Won | 34 | Home | MCG |
| 10 | 3 June | 7:10 p.m. | 16.13 (109) | Brisbane Lions | 12.11 (83) | Won | 26 | Away | MCG |
| 11 | 12 June | 2:10 p.m. | 14.10 (94) | Melbourne | 22.9 (141) | Lost | 47 | Away | MCG |
| 12 | 24 June | 7:10 p.m. | 14.11 (95) | Sydney | 11.16 (82) | Won | 13 | Away | Telstra Stadium |
| 13 | 2 July | 2:10 p.m. | 6.9 (45) | Richmond | 13.14 (92) | Lost | 47 | Away | MCG |
| 14 | 9 July | 2:10 p.m. | 9.9 (63) | St Kilda | 19.8 (122) | Lost | 59 | Away | Telstra Dome |
| 15 | 16 July | 2:10 p.m. | 15.14 (104) | Fremantle | 18.11 (119) | Lost | 15 | Home | MCG |
| 16 | 22 July | 2:10 p.m. | 19.13 (127) | West Coast Eagles | 13.12 (90) | Won | 37 | Home | Telstra Dome |
| 17 | 28 July | 7:40 p.m. | 16.17 (113) | Hawthorn | 11.2 (68) | Won | 45 | Home | MCG |
| 18 | 5 August | 7:40 p.m. | 7.12 (54) | Adelaide | 7.16 (58) | Lost | 4 | Away | AAMI Stadium |
| 19 | 11 August | 7:40 p.m. | 9.7 (61) | Essendon | 10.14 (74) | Lost | 13 | Away | MCG |
| 20 | 18 August | 7:40 p.m. | 12.17 (89) | Port Adelaide | 12.25 (87) | Won | 2 | Away | AAMI Stadium |
| 21 | 27 August | 2:10 p.m. | 24.12 (156) | Carlton | 17.10 (112) | Won | 44 | Home | MCG |
| 22 | 3 September | 2:10 p.m. | 20.19 (139) | Kangaroos | 10.11 (71) | Won | 68 | Home | MCG |

== Finals ==
| Round | Date | Local Time | Collingwood's Score | Opponent | Their Score | Won/Lost | Margin | Home/Away | Venue |
|---|---|---|---|---|---|---|---|---|---|
| Elimination Final | 10 September | 2:30 p.m. | 11.14 (80) | Western Bulldogs | 18.13 (121) | Lost | 41 | Home | MCG |
