= 2003 AFL draft =

Draft for the Australian Football League

General information
- Date: 24 November 2003
- Network: Fox Sports
- Sponsored by: National Australia Bank

Overview
- League: AFL
- First selection: Adam Cooney (Western Bulldogs)

The 2003 AFL draft was the 2003 instance of the AFL draft, the annual draft of talented players by Australian rules football teams that participate in the main competition of that sport, the Australian Football League. The 2003 draft consisted of a trade period, the national, pre-season and rookie drafts and the elevation of previously drafted rookies to the senior list.

There were 83 draft selections between the 16 teams in the national draft. The Western Bulldogs received the first pick in the national draft after finishing on the bottom of the ladder during the 2003 AFL season. The Bulldogs and Melbourne both received a priority selection for having earned 20 premiership points of less during the preceding season. Carlton also received a priority selection, despite being banned from the first two rounds of this year's draft, owing to salary cap breaches discovered the previous year.

This draft is considered one of the weaker drafts, with almost half of the 16 club's first picks delisted within the following 4 years. It has produced one Brownlow Medallist, Adam Cooney, who is the first and, as of 2025, only number-one draft pick to win the award.

The main trades that occurred involved Nathan Brown switching from the Bulldogs to Richmond and Trent Croad returning to Hawthorn after spending two years with Fremantle. The trading period also contained "The Veale Deal", where unknown youngster Lochlan Veale was traded by Hawthorn to the Western Bulldogs in a lopsided three-way deal involving Essendon. In the deal, Hawthorn gained Danny Jacobs, Essendon gained Mark Alvey and the number-six selection in the draft and the Bulldogs officially only received Veale, and had an understanding Hawthorn that they would not trade Jade Rawlings to any other club, allowing the Bulldogs to select him with the first selection in the pre-season draft.

== Trades ==
Trade	Player	Original club	New club	Traded for
1	Trent Croad	Fremantle	Hawthorn	draft pick #10
2	Steven Koops	Fremantle	Western Bulldogs	draft pick #19
3	Peter Street	Geelong	Western Bulldogs	draft pick #20
4	David Haynes and draft pick #42	West Coast Eagles	Geelong	draft pick #20
5	Ben Holland	Richmond	Melbourne	draft pick #21
6	Jason Gram	Brisbane Lions	St Kilda	draft pick #23
7	Scott Stevens and draft pick #31	Sydney Swans	Adelaide Crows	draft picks #29 and #45
8	Adam Morgan	Port Adelaide	Western Bulldogs	draft pick #34
9	Heath Scotland	Collingwood	Carlton	draft pick #35
10	Brent Guerra	Port Adelaide	St Kilda	draft pick #39
11	Daniel Harford and Brett Johnson	Hawthorn	Carlton	draft pick #51
12	Matthew Allan	Carlton	Essendon	draft pick #57
13	Nathan Brown	Western Bulldogs	Richmond	draft picks #6 and #20
14	Corey McKernan	Carlton	Kangaroos	Digby Morrell and David Teague
15	Justin Murphy	Carlton	Essendon	Cory McGrath
16	Lochlan Veale	Hawthorn	Essendon	Danny Jacobs
16	Danny Jacobs	Essendon	Western Bulldogs	Mark Alvey draft pick #6
16	Mark Alvey draft pick #6	Western Bulldogs	Hawthorn	Lochlan Veale
17	Simon Beaumont	Carlton	Hawthorn	David Clarke
17	David Clarke	Geelong	Carlton	David Loats
17	David Loats	Hawthorn	Geelong	Simon Beaumont

== 2003 national draft ==
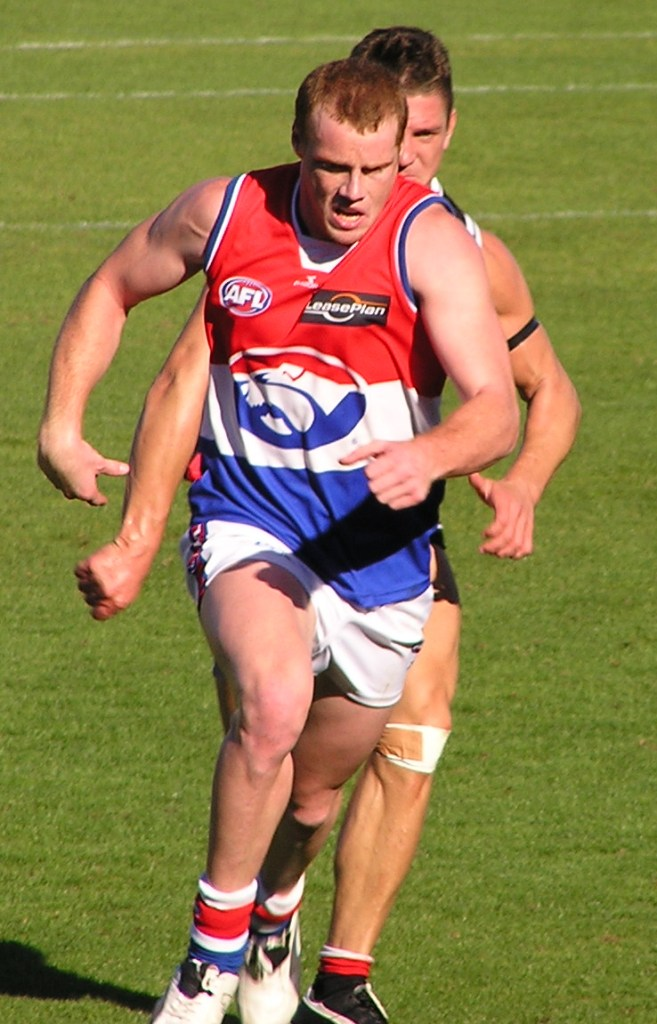
Adam Cooney, pick 1

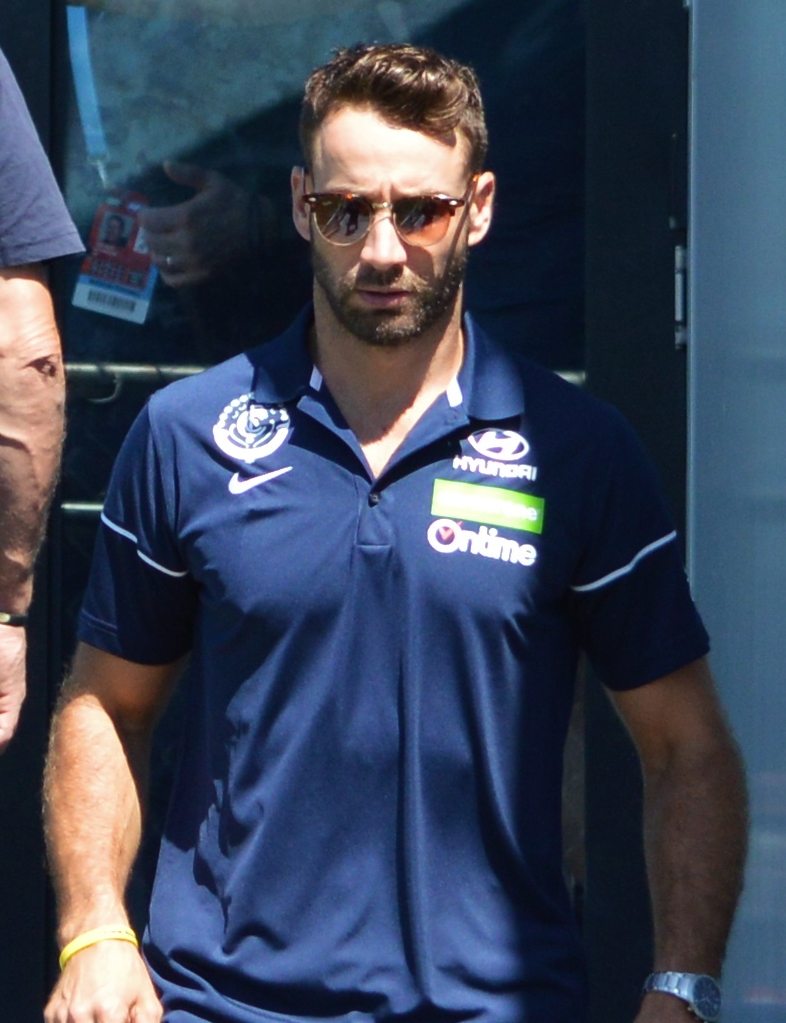
Andrew Walker, pick 2

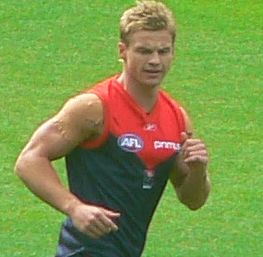
Colin Sylvia, pick 3

*	Denotes player who has been a premiership player and been selected for at least one All-Australian team
^{+}	Denotes player who has been a premiership player at least once
^{x}	Denotes player who has been selected for at least one All-Australian team
^{~}	Denotes player who has been selected as Rising Star

Round	Pick	Player	Recruited from	Club
Priority	1	Adam Cooney	West Adelaide Football Club	Western Bulldogs
Priority	2	Andrew Walker	Bendigo Pioneers	Carlton
Priority	3	Colin Sylvia	Bendigo Pioneers	Melbourne
1	4	Farren Ray	Peel Thunder Football Club	Western Bulldogs
1	5	Brock McLean	Calder Cannons	Melbourne
1	6	Kepler Bradley	West Perth Football Club	Essendon
1	7	Kane Tenace	Murray Bushrangers	Geelong
1	8	Raphael Clarke	St Mary's Football Club	St Kilda
1	9	David Trotter	Calder Cannons	Kangaroos
1	10	Ryley Dunn	Murray Bushrangers	Fremantle
1	11	Beau Waters	West Adelaide Football Club	West Coast Eagles
1	12	Ryan Murphy	Gippsland Power	Fremantle
1	13	Brent Stanton	Northern Knights	Essendon
1	14	Fergus Watts	Sandringham Dragons	Adelaide Crows
1	15	Troy Chaplin	North Ballarat Rebels	Port Adelaide
1	16	Josh Willoughby	Glenelg Football Club	Sydney Swans
1	17	Billy Morrison	Tassie Mariners	Collingwood
1	18	Llane Spaanderman	East Perth Football Club	Brisbane Lions
2	19	David Mundy	Murray Bushrangers	Fremantle
2	20	Sam Butler	Central District Bulldogs	West Coast Eagles
2	21	Alex Gilmour	Tassie Mariners	Richmond
2	22	Cameron Thurley	Tasmanian Devils Football Club	Geelong
2	23	Matthew Moody	South Fremantle Football Club	Brisbane Lions
2	24	Chad Jones	Claremont Football Club	Kangaroos
2	25	Harry Miller	Port Adelaide (SANFL)	Hawthorn
2	26	Daniel McConnell	Eastern Ranges	West Coast Eagles
2	27	Adam Campbell	North Ballarat Rebels	Fremantle
2	28	Jay Nash	Central District Bulldogs	Essendon
2	29	Tim Schmidt	West Adelaide Football Club	Sydney Swans
2	30	Brad Symes	Central District Bulldogs	Port Adelaide
2	31	Joshua Krueger	Glenelg Football Club	Adelaide Crows
2 (f/s)	32	Brayden Shaw	Northern Knights	Collingwood
2	33	Jed Adcock	North Ballarat Rebels	Brisbane Lions
3	34	Luke Peel	Sandringham Dragons	Port Adelaide
3	35	Brent Hall	South Fremantle Football Club	Collingwood
3 (f/s)	36	Chris Johnson	East Fremantle Football Club	Melbourne
3 (f/s)	37	Thomas Roach	Oakleigh Chargers	Richmond
3 (f/s)	38	Mark Blake	Geelong Falcons	Geelong
3	39	Robert Forster-Knight	Essendon	Port Adelaide
3	40	Eddie Sansbury	Central District Bulldogs	Kangaroos
3	41	Zac Dawson	Calder Cannons	Hawthorn
3	42	Matthew Spencer	Swan Districts Football Club	Geelong
3 (f/s)	43	Brett Peake	East Fremantle Football Club	Fremantle
3	44	Ricky Dyson	Northern Knights	Essendon
3	45	Amon Buchanan	Sydney Swans	Sydney Swans
3	46	Michael Pettigrew	West Perth Football Club	Port Adelaide
3	47	Andrew Eriksen	Sandringham Dragons	Sydney Swans
3 (f/s)	48	Heath Shaw	Northern Knights	Collingwood
3	49	Tom Logan	Waratah Football Club	Brisbane Lions
4	50	Izaac Thomson	Woodville-West Torrens Football Club	Western Bulldogs
4	51	Matthew Ball	Box Hill Hawks	Hawthorn
4	52	Pass		Melbourne
4	53	Daniel Jackson	Oakleigh Chargers	Richmond
4	54	Pass		Geelong
4	55	Sam Fisher	West Adelaide Football Club	St Kilda
4	56	Brent LeCras	West Perth Football Club	Kangaroos
4	57	Ricky Mott	Fremantle rookie list	Carlton
4	58	Ben Hudson	Werribee Football Club	Adelaide Crows
4	59	Matthew Davis	North Adelaide Football Club	Sydney Swans
4	60	Julian Rowe	Oakleigh Chargers	Collingwood
4	61	Michael Rischitelli	Western Jets	Brisbane Lions
5	62	Pass		Western Bulldogs
5	63	Glen Bowyer	Hawthorn	Carlton
5	64	Shane Morrison	Brisbane Lions	Richmond
5	65	Craig Callaghan	St Kilda	St Kilda
5	66	Pass		Kangaroos
5	67	Pass		Adelaide Crows
5	68	Clinton Thomas	Eastern Ranges	Brisbane Lions
6	69	Jordan Bannister	Essendon	Carlton
6	70	Brent Hartigan	Calder Cannons	Richmond
6	71	Pass		St Kilda
7	72	Adrian Deluca	Port Melbourne Football Club	Carlton
7	73	Shane Tuck	West Adelaide Football Club	Richmond
7	74	Pass		St Kilda
8	75	Stephen Kenna	Box Hill Hawks	Carlton
8	76	Andrew Raines	Southport Australian Football Club	Richmond
8	77	Pass		St Kilda
9	78	Pass		Carlton
9	79	Simon Fletcher	Carlton	Richmond
10	80	Pass		Carlton
10	81	Kyle Archibald	NSW/ACT Rams	Richmond
11	82	Pass		Richmond
12	83	Pass		Richmond

== 2004 pre-season draft ==
Pick	Player	Recruited from	Recruited to
1	Jade Rawlings	Hawthorn	Western Bulldogs
2	Nick Stevens	Port Adelaide	Carlton
3	Phillip Read	West Coast Eagles	Melbourne
4	Ben Marsh	Adelaide Crows	Richmond
5	Paul Koulouriotis	Port Adelaide	Geelong
6	Shane Harvey	Essendon	Kangaroos
7	Doug Scott	Box Hill Hawks	Hawthorn
8	Michael Johnson	Perth Football Club	Fremantle
9	Pass		Adelaide Crows
10	Jacob Surjan	South Fremantle Football Club	Port Adelaide
11	Luke Weller	Brisbane Lions	Richmond
12	Josh Mahoney	Williamstown Football Club	Port Adelaide

== 2004 rookie draft ==
Pick	Player	Recruited from	Recruited to
1	James Condos	Werribee	Western Bulldogs
2	Andrew Carrazzo	Geelong	Carlton
3	Aaron Davey	Port Melbourne	Melbourne
4	Nathan Foley	Geelong Falcons	Richmond
5	Luke Buckland	Geelong Falcons	Geelong
6	Dylan Pfitzner	Central District	St Kilda
7	Pass		North Melbourne
8	Ben Clifton	Calder Cannons	Hawthorn
9	Brett Jones	Claremont	West Coast
10	Paul Duffield	South Fremantle	Fremantle
11	Ben Cosgriff	Murray Bushrangers	Essendon
12	Tim Hazell	Hawthorn	Adelaide
13	Adam Grocke	North Adelaide	Port Adelaide
14	Aaron Rogers	Melbourne	Sydney
15	Zane Leonard	Dandenong Stingrays	Collingwood
16	Daniel Pratt	North Melbourne	Brisbane
17	Pass		Western Bulldogs
18	Murray Boyd	Western Jets	Carlton
19	Paul Newman	Kyabram	Melbourne
20	Marc Dragicevic	Richmond	Richmond
21	James Allan	Geelong Falcons	Geelong
22	Nick Stone	Hawthorn	St Kilda
23	Pass		North Melbourne
24	Michael Rix	Box Hill Hawks	Hawthorn
25	Michael Embley	Swan Districts	West Coast
26	Dylan Smith	North Melbourne	Fremantle
27	Nathan Lovett-Murray	Williamstown	Essendon
28	Rowan Andrews	Tassie Mariners	Adelaide
29	Salim Hassan	West Adelaide	Port Adelaide
30	Scott McGlone	Sydney Swans	Sydney
31	David Fanning	Aberfeldie	Collingwood
32	Matthew Pardew	Morningside	Brisbane
33	Pass		Western Bulldogs
34	Adam Bentick	Calder Cannons	Carlton
35	Luke Molan	Melbourne	Melbourne
36	Pass		Richmond
37	Pass		St Kilda
38	Pass		North Melbourne
39	Josh Thurgood	North Ballarat Rebels	Hawthorn
40	Jaymie Graham	South Fremantle	West Coast
41	Michael Warren	Claremont	Fremantle
42	Andrew Lovett	East Perth	Essendon
43	Brad Dabrowski	West Adelaide	Adelaide
44	Dale Ellis	Woodville-West Torrens	Port Adelaide
45	Daniel Hunt	Sydney Swans	Sydney
46	Dean Benson	Oakleigh Chargers	Collingwood
47	Josh Drummond	Northern Eagles	Brisbane
48	Pass		Western Bulldogs
49	Sam Pleming	Gippsland Power	Carlton
50	Joel Campbell	Pioneers	Melbourne
51	Pass		St Kilda
52	Pass		North Melbourne
53	Shaun Bergin	Bendigo Pioneers	Hawthorn
54	Clancy Rudeforth	Claremont	West Coast
55	Ben Colreavy	Claremont	Fremantle
56	Peter Summers	Northern Bullants	Essendon
57	Matthew Smith	Adelaide	Adelaide
58	Pass		Port Adelaide
59	Luke Taylor	Murray Bushrangers	Sydney
60	Justin Crow	Collingwood	Collingwood
61	Jacob Furfaro	Mt Gravatt	Brisbane
62	Setanta Ó hAilpín	Ireland	Carlton
63	Pass		North Melbourne
64	Paul Shelton	Morningside	Hawthorn
65	James Davies	Essendon	Essendon
66	Nick Potter	Pennant Hills	Sydney
67	Leigh Ryswyk	Southport	Brisbane
68	Adrian Wilson	Essendon	Essendon
69	Pass		Sydney
70	Jeremy Stiller	Northern Eagles	Brisbane
71	Pass		Sydney
72	Pass		Brisbane
73	Pass		Sydney
74	Pass		Brisbane
75	Pass		Brisbane

== Rookie elevation ==
In alphabetical order of professional clubs. This list details 2003-listed rookies who were elevated to the senior list; it does not list players taken as rookies in the rookie draft which occurred during the 2003/04 off-season.

Player	Recruited from	Club
Hayden Skipworth	Woodville-West Torrens	Adelaide Crows
Joel Macdonald	Mt Gravatt	Brisbane Lions
Jonathan McCormack	Murray Kangaroos	Carlton
Ben Haynes	Western Jets	Essendon
Courtney Johns	East Fremantle	Essendon
Luke Webster	East Perth	Fremantle
Daniel Gilmore	South Fremantle	Fremantle
Will Slade	Oakleigh Chargers	Geelong
Ben Kane	Eastern Ranges	Hawthorn
Brad Sewell	North Ballarat	Hawthorn
Jeremy Clayton	North Ballarat	Kangaroos
Michael Firrito	Eastern Ranges	Kangaroos
Nathan Carroll	Claremont	Melbourne
Allan Murray	Port Adelaide	St Kilda
Heath James	Port Adelaide Magpies	Sydney Swans
James Meiklejohn	NSW/ACT Rams	Sydney Swans
Zac Beeck	East Perth	West Coast Eagles
Mark Nicoski	Subiaco	West Coast Eagles
Matthew Boyd	Frankston	Western Bulldogs
