= 2004 AFL draft =

Draft for the Australian Football League

General information
- Date: 20 November 2004
- Location: Melbourne Park Function Centre
- Network: Fox Sports
- Sponsored by: National Australia Bank

Overview
- League: AFL
- First selection: Brett Deledio (Richmond)

The 2004 AFL draft, concerning player acquisitions in the 2004/05 Australian Football League off-season, consisted of a trade period, a national draft, a pre-season draft, and the elevation of rookies. The AFL draft is the annual draft of talented players by Australian rules football teams that participate in the main competition of that sport, the Australian Football League.

In 2004 there were 78 picks to be drafted between 16 teams in the national draft. Richmond received the first pick in the national draft after finishing on the bottom of the ladder during the 2004 AFL season. Three teams were allocated priority draft picks for winning 5 or fewer games in the previous season, Richmond, Hawthorn and Western Bulldogs. Carlton's two-year ban from the first and second rounds of the AFL draft expired in 2004 and they returned to the early part of the draft, with selections 9 and 25. As it had traded away its first and second-round draft picks in 2001, effectively the Blues' first and second-round draft picks were its first since 2000. They finished the 2004 season 11th with 10 wins and 12 losses, too high to be eligible for a priority draft pick.

== Key Dates ==
Table of key dates
| Event | Date(s) |
|---|---|
| Trade period | 4–8 October |
| National draft | 20 November |
| Pre-season draft | 14 December |
| Rookie draft | 14 December |

== Trades ==
In alphabetical order of new clubs

| Trade | Player | Original club | New club | Traded for |
|---|---|---|---|---|
| 1 | Nathan Thompson | Hawthorn | Kangaroos | draft picks #10 and #26 |
| 2 | Bo Nixon and pick #7 | Collingwood | Hawthorn | draft picks #10 and #37 |
| 3 | Josh Carr and draft pick #43 | Port Adelaide | Fremantle | draft picks #11, #27 and #45 |
| 4 | Scott Thompson | Melbourne | Adelaide | draft pick #12 |
| 5 | Brent Moloney | Geelong | Melbourne | draft pick #12 |
| 6 | Brad Ottens | Richmond | Geelong | draft picks #12 and #16 |
| 7 | Tyson Stenglein | Adelaide | West Coast | draft picks #12 and #28 |
| 8 | Darren Jolly | Melbourne | Sydney Swans | draft pick #15 |
| 9 | Aaron Shattock and pick #34 | Brisbane Lions | Port Adelaide | draft pick #27 and #45 |
| 10 | Paul Johnson | West Coast | Melbourne | draft pick #29 |
| 11 | Chad Morrison | West Coast | Collingwood | draft pick #37 |
| 12 | Peter Walsh and pick #45 | Melbourne | Port Adelaide | draft pick #43 |
| 13 | Callum Chambers | West Coast | Carlton | draft pick #57 |
| 14 | Troy Longmuir | Fremantle | Carlton | draft pick #67 |
| 15 | Aaron Fiora | Richmond | St Kilda | Troy Simmonds |
| 15 | Troy Simmonds | Fremantle | Richmond | Heath Black |
| 15 | Heath Black | St Kilda | Fremantle | Aaron Fiora |

== 2004 national draft ==
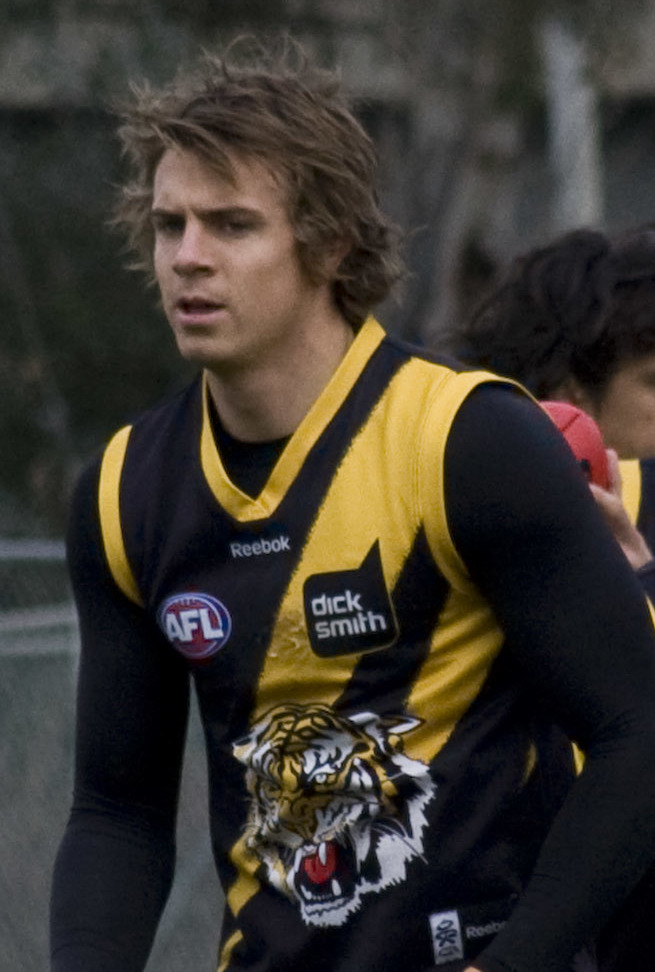
Brett Deledio, pick 1

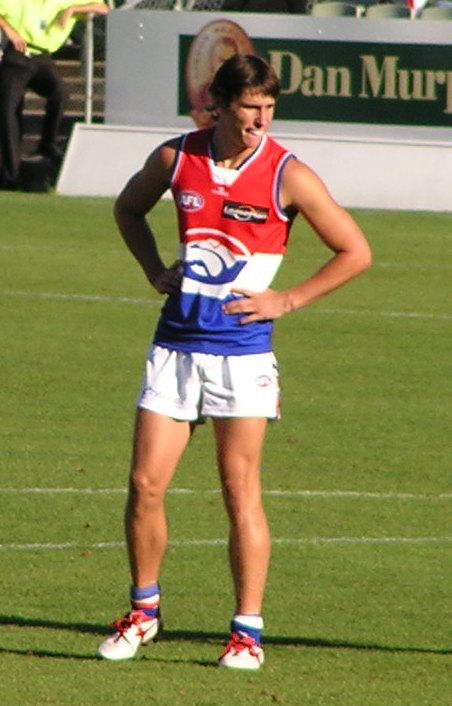
Ryan Griffen, pick 3

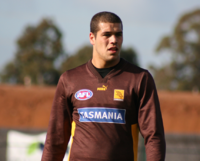
Lance Franklin, pick 5

| * | Denotes player who has been a premiership player and been selected for at least one All-Australian team |
| ^{+} | Denotes player who has been a premiership player at least once |
| ^{x} | Denotes player who has been selected for at least one All-Australian team |
| ^{~} | Denotes player who has been selected as Rising Star |

| Round | Pick | Player | Recruited from | Club |
|---|---|---|---|---|
| Priority | 1 | Brett Deledio | Murray Bushrangers | Richmond |
| Priority | 2 | Jarryd Roughead | Gippsland Power | Hawthorn |
| Priority | 3 | Ryan Griffen | South Adelaide Football Club | Western Bulldogs |
| 1 | 4 | Richard Tambling | Southern Districts Football Club | Richmond |
| 1 | 5 | Lance Franklin | Perth Football Club | Hawthorn |
| 1 | 6 | Tom Williams | Morningside Football Club | Western Bulldogs |
| 1 | 7 | Jordan Lewis | Geelong Falcons | Hawthorn |
| 1 | 8 | John Meesen | Geelong Falcons | Adelaide |
| 1 | 9 | Jordan Russell | West Adelaide Football Club | Carlton |
| 1 | 10 | Chris Egan | Murray Bushrangers | Collingwood |
| 1 | 11 | Adam Thomson | Sturt Football Club | Port Adelaide |
| 1 | 12 | Danny Meyer | Glenelg Football Club | Richmond |
| 1 | 13 | Matthew Bate | Eastern Ranges | Melbourne |
| 1 | 14 | Angus Monfries | Sturt Football Club | Essendon |
| 1 | 15 | Lynden Dunn | Calder Cannons | Melbourne |
| 1 | 16 | Adam Pattison | Northern Knights | Richmond |
| 1 | 17 | Andrew McQualter | Gippsland Power | St Kilda |
| 1 | 18 | Cameron Wood | West Adelaide Football Club | Brisbane Lions |
| 1 | 19 | Ryan Willits | Northern Knights | Port Adelaide |
| 2 | 20 | Dean Polo | Gippsland Power | Richmond |
| 2 | 21 | Thomas Murphy | Sandringham Dragons | Hawthorn |
| 2 | 22 | Jesse Wells | Tasmanian Devils Football Club | Western Bulldogs |
| 2 | 23 | Sean Rusling | West Adelaide Football Club | Collingwood |
| 2 | 24 | Nathan van Berlo | West Perth Football Club | Adelaide |
| 2 | 25 | Adam Hartlett | West Adelaide Football Club | Carlton |
| 2 | 26 | Matt Little | Calder Cannons | Hawthorn |
| 2 | 27 | Pat Garner | Western Magpies | Brisbane Lions |
| 2 | 28 | Chad Gibson | Norwood Football Club | Adelaide |
| 2 | 29 | Matt Rosa | North Ballarat Football Club | West Coast Eagles |
| 2 | 30 | Andrew Lee | Tasmanian Devils Football Club | Essendon |
| 2 | 31 | Jarred Moore | Dandenong Stingrays | Sydney Swans |
| 2 | 32 | Brent Prismall | Western Jets | Geelong |
| 2 | 33 | Cain Ackland | Port Adelaide Football Club | St Kilda |
| 2 | 34 | James Ezard | Calder Cannons | Port Adelaide |
| 2 | 35 | Fabian Deluca | Eastern Ranges | Port Adelaide |
| 3 | 36 | Luke McGuane | Broadbeach Football Club | Richmond |
| 3 | 37 | Mark LeCras | West Perth Football Club | West Coast Eagles |
| 3 | 38 | Damien McCormack | Dandenong Stingrays | Western Bulldogs |
| 3 | 39 (F/S) | Travis Cloke | Eastern Ranges | Collingwood |
| 3 | 40 | Ivan Maric | Calder Cannons | Adelaide |
| 3 | 41 (F/S) | Luke Blackwell | Swan Districts Football Club | Carlton |
| 3 | 42 (F/S) | Jesse W. Smith | Calder Cannons | Kangaroos |
| 3 | 43 | Michael Newton | Murray Bushrangers | Melbourne |
| 3 | 44 (F/S) | Mitch Morton | Claremont Football Club | West Coast Eagles |
| 3 | 45 | Justin Sherman | Clarence Football Club | Brisbane Lions |
| 3 | 46 | Henry Slattery | West Adelaide Football Club | Essendon |
| 3 | 47 | David Spriggs | Geelong | Sydney Swans |
| 3 | 48 (F/S) | Nathan Ablett | Modewarre | Geelong |
| 3 | 49 | Mark McGough | Collingwood | St Kilda |
| 3 | 50 | Jayden Attard | Dandenong Stingrays | Brisbane Lions |
| 3 | 51 | Ben Eckermann | Sturt Football Club | Port Adelaide |
| 4 | 52 | Dean Limbach | Calder Cannons | Richmond |
| 4 | 53 | Simon Taylor | Box Hill Hawks | Hawthorn |
| 4 | 54 | Stephen Tiller | West Adelaide Football Club | Western Bulldogs |
| 4 | 55 | Adam Iacobucci | Calder Cannons | Collingwood |
| 4 | 56 | Chris Knights | Eastern Ranges | Adelaide |
| 4 | 57 | Brad Smith | Subiaco Football Club | West Coast Eagles |
| 4 | 58 | Brad Moran | Southport Sharks | Kangaroos |
| 4 | 59 | Benet Copping | Sturt Football Club | Fremantle |
| 4 | 60 | Paul Thomas | Central District Bulldogs | Essendon |
| 4 | 61 | Heath James | Sydney Swans | Sydney Swans |
| 4 | 62 | Matthew Egan | Geelong VFL | Geelong |
| 4 | 63 | James Gwilt | Noble Park Football Club | St Kilda |
| 4 | 64 | Luke Forsyth | Dandenong Stingrays | Brisbane Lions |
| 5 | 65 | Mark Graham | Hawthorn | Richmond |
| 5 | 66 | Pass | | Collingwood |
| 5 | 67 | Toby Stribling | North Adelaide Football Club | Fremantle |
| 5 | 68 | Ben Schwarze | Port Melbourne Football Club | Kangaroos |
| 5 | 69 | Daniel Haines | Fremantle | Fremantle |
| 5 | 70 | Pass | | Essendon |
| 5 | 71 | Pass | | St Kilda |
| 6 | 72 | Pass | | Richmond |
| 6 | 73 | Chris Bryan | Frankston Dolphins | Carlton |
| 6 | 74 | Daniel Pratt | Brisbane Lions (rookie list) | Kangaroos |
| 6 | 75 | Pass | | Fremantle |
| 6 | 76 | Pass | | St Kilda |
| 6 | 77 | Anthony Raso | Dandenong Stingrays | Carlton |

== 2005 pre-season draft ==
| Pick | Player | Recruited from | Club |
|---|---|---|---|
| 1 | Trent Knobel | St Kilda | Richmond |
| 2 | Blake Caracella | Brisbane Lions | Collingwood |
| 3 | Eddie Betts | Calder Cannons | Carlton |
| 4 | Lance Picioane | Hawthorn | Kangaroos |
| 5 | Jarrad Schofield | Port Adelaide | Fremantle |
| 6 | Ty Zantuck | Richmond | Essendon |
| 7 | Elijah Ware | Central District Bulldogs | Port Adelaide |
| 8 | Pass | | Richmond |

== 2005 rookie draft ==
| Pick | Player | Recruited from | Club |
|---|---|---|---|
| 1 | Will Thursfield | Sandringham U18 | Richmond |
| 2 | Ruory Kirkby | Bendigo U18 | Hawthorn |
| 3 | Rowan Nayna | Dandenong U18 | Western Bulldogs |
| 4 | Ben Davies | Western U18 | Collingwood |
| 5 | Ryan Nye | Peel Thunder | Adelaide |
| 6 | Daniel Batson | North Ballarat U18 | Carlton |
| 7 | Josh Gibson | Port Melbourne | North Melbourne |
| 8 | Joseph Krieger | Sandringham U18 | Fremantle |
| 9 | Ben Sharp | Oakleigh U18 | West Coast |
| 10 | Brendan Van Schaik | Murray U18 | Melbourne |
| 11 | Ryan Bain | Oakleigh U18 | Essendon |
| 12 | Guy Campbell | Bendigo Bombers | Sydney |
| 13 | Jarrod Garth | Tasmania U18 | Geelong |
| 14 | Luke Mullins | Collingwood | St Kilda |
| 15 | Travis Baird | Bendigo U18 | Brisbane Lions |
| 16 | Danyle Pearce | Sturt | Port Adelaide |
| 17 | Pass | | Richmond |
| 18 | Clinton Young | North Ballarat U18 | Hawthorn |
| 19 | Dale Morris | Werribee | Western Bulldogs |
| 20 | Heritier Lumumba (Note: Heritier Lumumba was known as Harry O'Brien when drafted) | Claremont | Collingwood |
| 21 | Jonathon Griffin | East Fremantle | Adelaide |
| 22 | Jesse D. Smith | Calder U18 | Carlton |
| 23 | Josh Thewlis | Sydney | North Melbourne |
| 24 | Jack Juniper | Glenelg | Fremantle |
| 25 | Beau Maister | Claremont | West Coast |
| 26 | Matthew Warnock | Sandringham | Melbourne |
| 27 | Ben Jolley | Calder U18 | Essendon |
| 28 | Luke Vogels | Terang Mortlake | Sydney |
| 29 | Nick Batchelor | Norwood | Geelong |
| 30 | Ed McDonnell | Western Magpies | St Kilda |
| 31 | Pass | | Brisbane Lions |
| 32 | Robert Forster-Knight | Port Adelaide | Port Adelaide |
| 33 | Pass | | Richmond |
| 34 | Thomas Willday | Perth | Hawthorn |
| 35 | Pass | | Western Bulldogs |
| 36 | John Hinge | Glenelg | Adelaide |
| 37 | Nick Becker | Calder U18 | Carlton |
| 38 | Scott McMahon | Woodville-West Torrens | North Melbourne |
| 39 | Ryan Crowley | Fremantle | Fremantle |
| 40 | Ashley Thornton | Peel Thunder | West Coast |
| 41 | Pass | | Melbourne |
| 42 | Heath Grundy | Norwood | Sydney |
| 43 | Tim Sheringham | Geelong Falcons | Geelong |
| 44 | Pass | | St Kilda |
| 45 | Pass | | Brisbane Lions |
| 46 | Pass | | Port Adelaide |
| 47 | Pass | | Richmond |
| 48 | Kristan Height | Box Hill Hawks | Hawthorn |
| 49 | Pass | | Western Bulldogs |
| 50 | Aisake O'hAilpin | Cork (Ireland) | Carlton |
| 51 | Justin Perkins | Perth | North Melbourne |
| 52 | Aaron Edwards | West Coast | West Coast |
| 53 | Pass | | Melbourne |
| 54 | Stefan Garrubba | Dandenong U18 | Sydney |
| 55 | Pass | | St Kilda |
| 56 | Pass | | Brisbane Lions |
| 57 | Pass | | North Melbourne |
| 58 | Pass | | Melbourne |
| 59 | Earl Shaw | Campbelltown | Sydney |
| 60 | Josh Drummond | Northern Eagles | Brisbane Lions |
| 61 | Ed Clarke | North Shore | Sydney |
| 62 | Marcus Allan | Northern Eagles | Brisbane Lions |
| 63 | Andrew Hayes | Balmain | Sydney |
| 64 | Will Hamill | Mt Gravatt | Brisbane Lions |
| 65 | Marty Pask | Western Magpies | Brisbane Lions |
| 66 | Scott Harding | Morningside | Brisbane Lions |

== Rookie elevation ==
In alphabetical order of professional clubs. This list contains 2004-listed rookies who were elevated in the off-season; it does not detail the rookie draft which took place in the 2004/05 off-season.

| Player | Recruited from | Club |
|---|---|---|
| Matthew Smith | Oakleigh U18 | Adelaide |
| Leigh Ryswyk | Southport Sharks | Brisbane Lions |
| Adam Bentick | Calder Cannons | Carlton |
| Andrew Carrazzo | Geelong | Carlton |
| Nick Maxwell | North Ballarat Football Club | Collingwood |
| Steven Dodd | East Fremantle Football Club | Fremantle |
| Dylan Smith | Kangaroos | Fremantle |
| Shannon Byrnes | Murray Bushrangers | Geelong |
| Josh Thurgood | North Ballarat Roosters | Hawthorn |
| Aaron Davey | Port Melbourne Boroughs | Melbourne |
| Kelvin Moore | Yarra Valley Football Club | Richmond |
| Dylan Pfitzner | Central District Bulldogs | St Kilda |
| Nick Stone | Hawthorn | St Kilda |
| Paul Bevan | NSW-ACT U18 | Sydney Swans |
| Brett Jones | Claremont Football Club | West Coast Eagles |
