= David Fanning =

David Fanning may refer to:

- David Fanning (footballer) (born 1984), Australian rules footballer
- David Fanning (loyalist) (1755–1825), loyalist of the American Revolution in North Carolina
- David Fanning (musicologist) (born 1955), music professor and musicologist specializing on the music of Carl Nielsen and Dmitri Shostakovich
- David Fanning (singer), American country musician and record producer
- Dave Fanning (born 1956), Irish television and radio personality
- David Fanning (journalist) (born 1946), South African journalist; executive producer, Frontline, 1983–2015
