= Jesse D. Smith =

Australian rules footballer

Jesse Smith

Personal information
- Full name: Jesse D. Smith
- Born: 20 February 1986 (age 40)
- Original team: Rupertswood / Calder U18
- Debut: Round 20, 20 August 2006, Carlton vs. Richmond, at Telstra Dome

Playing career^{1}
Years	Club	Games (Goals)
2006	Carlton	2 (0)
- ^{1} Playing statistics correct to the end of 2006.

Jesse D. Smith (born 20 February 1986) is a former professional Australian rules footballer, playing for Carlton Football Club in the Australian Football League.

Originally from Rupertswood, Smith was drafted in the 2004 rookie draft and made his senior debut in Round 20, 2006 against Richmond Football Club. Smith played mainly in the midfield when with Carlton's VFL-affiliate, the Northern Bullants. He was delisted at the end of 2006 after only two games.

After his AFL career, Smith played for South Australian National Football League (SANFL) club West Adelaide in 2007, for Wangaratta in the Ovens & Murray Football League in 2008 and 2009, Sunbury in the Ballarat Football League in 2010, for Oak Park in the EDFL in 2011 and 2012, in 2013 for Koondrook/Barham in the Central Murray Football League, and in 2014 for Boort in the North Central Football League.

Smith is the cousin of Essendon player Andrew Welsh, who played with him at Koondrook/Barham.
