= St Francis de Sales Regional College =

St Francis De Sales Regional College

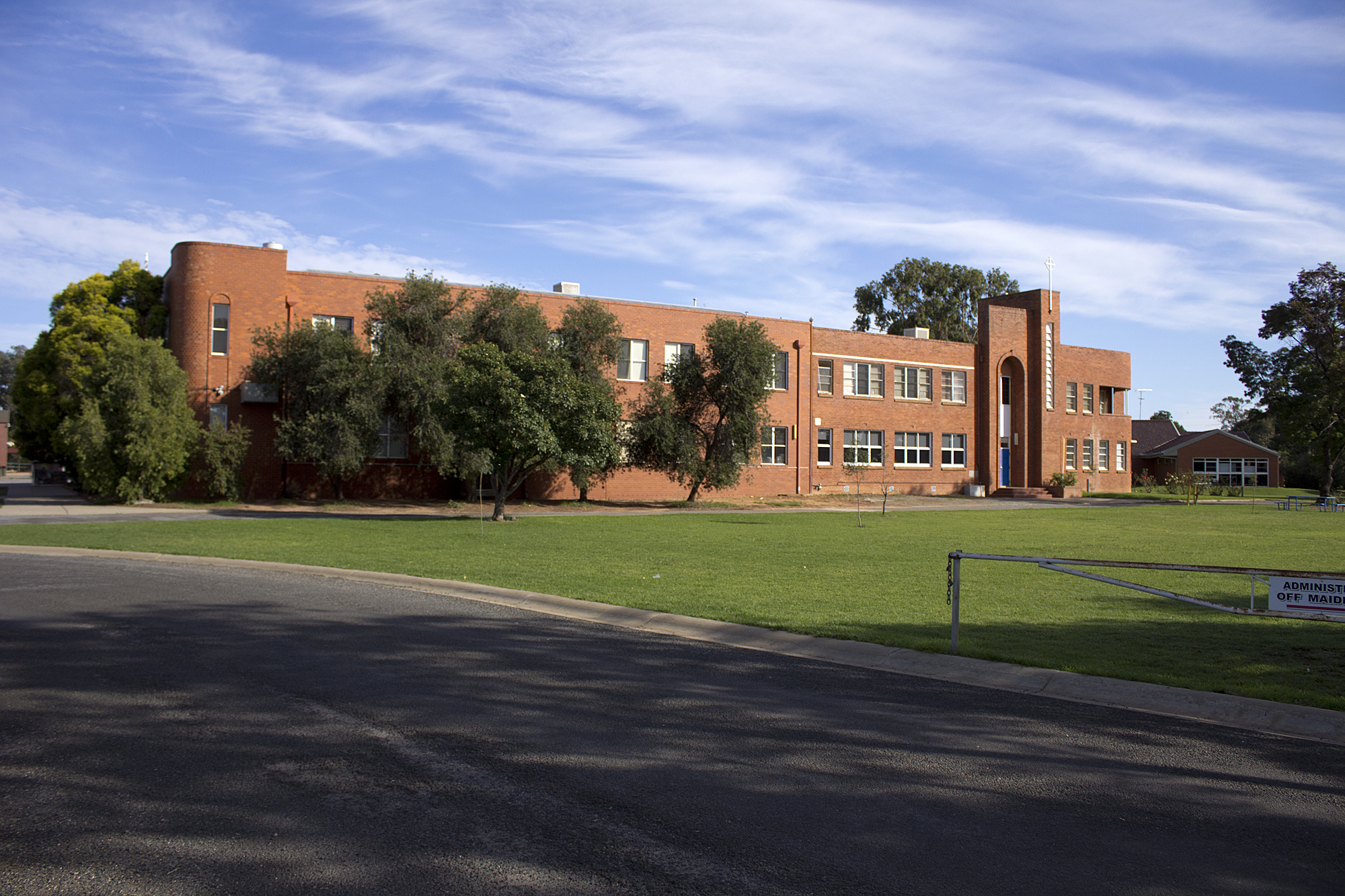
- St Francis de Sales Regional College

Location
- Yanco Avenue, Leeton, Riverina, New South Wales; Australia; 34°34′01″S 146°24′34″E

Information
- Type: Independent co-educational secondary day and boarding school
- Denomination: Roman Catholic
- Established: 1956; 70 years ago
- Founders: Marist Brothers
- Website: www.sfcww.catholic.edu.au

St Francis De Sales Regional College is an independent Roman Catholic co-educational secondary day and boarding school, located in the Riverina town of Leeton, New South Wales, Australia. Founded in 1956 by the Marist Brothers, the College is one of three secondary schools serving Leeton, most enrolments come from Leeton, with students also drawn from around the region as a result of the school's boarding program. These include Griffith, Narrandera, Deniliquin, Coleambally and Hay. The school is situated on Yanco Avenue on the southern approach to Leeton.

== Administration ==
Mrs. Brenda King was appointed as the first lay principal in 2004, and served until June 2015. Upon her departure, Mr. Sebastian Spina was appointed as acting principal until 2017 when he became principal, which he served until the end of 2022.

== Learning areas ==
The school's learning areas include:

- English
- Mathematics
- Science
- HSIE (Human Society and It's Environments)
- Creative Arts, including:
  - Drama
  - Music
  - Art
- PDHPE (Physical Development/Health/Physical Education)
- TAS (Technology and Applied Studies), including:
  - Food Technology
  - Textiles
  - Multimedia
  - Graphics Technology
- VET (Vocational Education and Training), including:
  - Hospitality
  - Construction
  - Industrial Metals
  - Industrial Timber
- Religion

== Notable former students ==
- Jacob Townsend – AFL Footballer
- Jacob Hopper – AFL Footballer
- David Trotter – AFL Footballer and player agent
- Matt Flynn – Footballer
- Charlie Hammer – Australian painter and TV personality

== See also ==
- List of Catholic schools in New South Wales
- List of boarding schools in Australia
- List of schools in the Riverina
- Catholic education in Australia
