= Alan Didak =

Australian rules footballer, born 1983

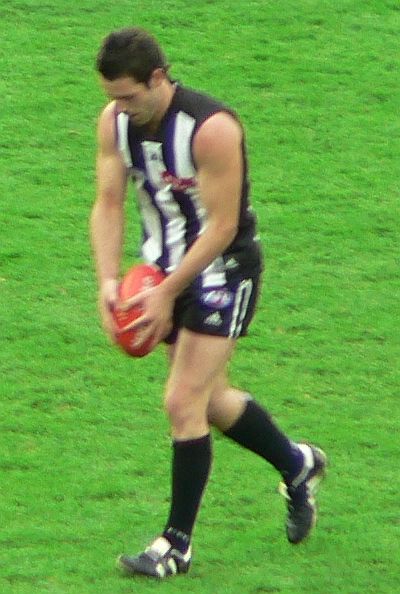
- Didak playing for Collingwood in 2006

Personal information
- Full name: Alan Didak
- Born: 15 February 1983 (age 43); Whyalla, South Australia
- Original team: Port Adelaide (SANFL)
- Draft: No. 3, 2000 National Draft, Collingwood
- Height: 184 cm (6 ft 0 in)
- Weight: 85 kg (187 lb)
- Position: Forward / Midfielder

Playing career^{1}
Years	Club	Games (Goals)
2001–2013	Collingwood	218 (274)

International team honours
Years	Team	Games (Goals)
2004	Australia	2
- ^{1} Playing statistics correct to the end of 2013.

Career highlights
- Collingwood premiership player 2010; Copeland Trophy 2006; 2x All-Australian Team 2006, 2010; Collingwood leading goalkicker 2010; International Rules Series 2004; Collingwood Football Club Hall of Fame; Collingwood Football Club Life Member; Jock McHale Medal 2010 (for 4th in Collingwood B&F)

Alan Didak (born 15 February 1983) is a former professional Australian rules footballer of Croatian descent who played for the Collingwood Football Club in the Australian Football League.

== Early life ==
Originally from Whyalla, South Australia, Didak played his junior football at Pooraka Football Club (Home of the mighty Bulls). Didak made his South Australian National Football League (SANFL) senior debut for Port Adelaide Football Club at the age of 17 years. He was the captain of the Under-18 Australian International rules football team in the junior International Rules Series against Ireland.

== AFL career ==
Didak was drafted by the Collingwood Football Club with the 3rd pick in the 2000 AFL draft, and in 2001 he made his AFL debut against the Kangaroos at the Telstra Dome in Round 7, gathering 10 possessions. He managed to kick a goal with both his first kick and first disposal. He played five games in total in 2001.

In 2002, Didak earned an AFL Rising Star nomination.

In 2003, Didak enjoyed his best season to date. In the Qualifying Final against Premiership favourites the Brisbane Lions, Didak came on in the last quarter and kicked two goals to win the match.

In 2005, Didak's season was disrupted by injuries and problems. He had knee surgery during the pre-season, setting him up for his first game on ANZAC Day against Essendon. His injury had an effect upon his performances. Having had minor issues since the mid-year break, he was suspended in Round 14 for two matches and after returning from that, he injured an ankle. When he returned in the next week, he lasted only 20 minutes, before suddenly fainting on the ground with an irregular heart beat.

In 2006 Didak was awarded the Copeland Trophy as the best and fairest Collingwood player for 2006. Didak was awarded All-Australian selection for the first time in his career.

In 2010, Didak enjoyed his career's best season, winning the club goalkicking with 41 goals and earning All-Australian selection. Didak placed 4th in the club's Best & Fairest, and was a hero of Collingwood's 15th premiership.

Didak started off 2011 strongly in a dominant Collingwood side; however, he began to succumb to injuries, which became a common theme until he was delisted at the end of the 2013 season after 13 seasons.

== Post-AFL career ==
Didak played one game for the Glenorchy Football Club in the TSL in 2014.

Didak finished his AFL Career with 218 games and 274 goals, placing him 8th on the all-time Collingwood goalkicking list. He played in 5 grand finals

Since his retirement, Didak has been awarded life membership for the club in 2015, and was inducted into the Collingwood Hall of Fame in 2017.

He currently is a logistics consultant and owns his own wine company, INDI Wines.

== Personal life ==
In late June 2007, it was revealed that Didak had met with Christopher Hudson, the self-confessed shooter in the 2007 Melbourne CBD shootings days before the shootings took place. According to police, Didak left the Spearmint Rhino with Hudson, where Hudson then allegedly fired random shots before travelling to the Hells Angels' East County Chapter headquarters in Campbellfield. Police believe that Didak was later dropped off near Southbank after the shooting incidents about 6.00am.

On 3 August 2008, Didak was a passenger in a car being driven by intoxicated teammate Heath Shaw which collided with another parked car. Both men initially denied that Didak was in any way involved. However, witness accounts to the incident identified him, and, on 4 August 2008, both men were fined and suspended for the remainder of the season over the deception.

On 6 September 2012, Alan became a first time dad to his daughter Indiana Willow Didak with his long-term partner Jacinta Jellett.

== Statistics ==
Legend
G	Goals	K	Kicks	D	Disposals	T	Tackles
B	Behinds	H	Handballs	M	Marks

Season	Team	No.	Games	Totals							Averages (per game)							Votes
Season	Team	No.	Games	G	B	K	H	D	M	T	G	B	K	H	D	M	T	Votes
2001	Collingwood	4	5	3	0	19	9	28	10	2	0.6	0.0	3.8	1.8	5.6	2.0	0.4	0
2002	Collingwood	4	19	24	10	147	46	193	51	24	1.3	0.5	7.7	2.4	10.2	2.7	1.3	0
2003	Collingwood	4	25	36	22	177	77	254	83	33	1.4	0.9	7.1	3.1	10.2	3.3	1.3	0
2004	Collingwood	4	18	21	26	186	42	228	76	22	1.2	1.4	10.3	2.3	12.7	4.2	1.2	2
2005	Collingwood	4	12	21	9	105	30	135	42	17	1.8	0.8	8.8	2.5	11.3	3.5	1.4	1
2006	Collingwood	4	23	41	23	280	116	396	136	46	1.8	1.0	12.2	5.0	17.2	5.9	2.0	4
2007	Collingwood	4	18	25	6	191	77	268	68	46	1.4	0.3	10.6	4.3	14.9	3.8	2.6	0
2008	Collingwood	4	18	24	15	325	77	402	102	38	1.3	0.8	18.1	4.3	22.3	5.7	2.1	3
2009	Collingwood	4	20	20	12	358	152	510	101	37	1.0	0.6	17.9	7.6	25.5	5.1	1.9	12
2010	Collingwood	4	24	41	21	350	240	590	101	65	1.7	0.9	14.6	10.0	24.6	4.2	2.7	11
2011	Collingwood	4	20	9	9	238	117	355	63	43	0.5	0.5	11.9	5.9	17.8	3.2	2.2	0
2012	Collingwood	4	11	6	7	130	51	181	39	11	0.5	0.6	11.8	4.6	16.5	3.5	1.0	0
2013	Collingwood	4	5	3	4	48	37	85	18	4	0.6	0.8	9.6	7.4	17.0	3.6	0.8	0
Career			218	274	164	2554	1071	3625	890	388	1.3	0.8	11.7	4.9	16.6	4.1	1.8	33
