= Julian Rowe =

Australian rules footballer, born 1985

Personal information
- Born: 25 May 1985 (age 41)
- Original team: Old Carey / Oakleigh U18 (TAC Cup)
- Debut: Round 14, 3 July 2004, Collingwood vs. Hawthorn, at Melbourne Cricket Ground

Playing career^{1}
Years	Club	Games (Goals)
2004–2006	Collingwood	26 (8)
- ^{1} Playing statistics correct to the end of 2006.

Julian Rowe (born 25 May 1985) is an Australian rules footballer with the Old Carey Football Club in the Victorian Amateur Football League, formerly with the AFL's Collingwood Football Club.

Originally from Old Carey, the youngster was considered a 'surprise pick' in the 2003 AFL draft by Collingwood coach Mick Malthouse because Rowe was still available at No. 60 overall. He made his senior debut mid-season and showed potential of becoming a long-term midfielder/half-forward, having a good debut season, playing 8 games. In 2005 he started with a string of games, becoming a regular, before being dropped despite lifting his form. He managed only 2 games in 2006 and was delisted at the end of the season.

Rowe joined Port Melbourne in 2007, along with the other Magpies Brayden Shaw and David Fanning. He has now gone back to his original club Old Carey which plays in the Premier section of the VAFA.
