= Brett Peake =

Australian rules footballer, born 1983

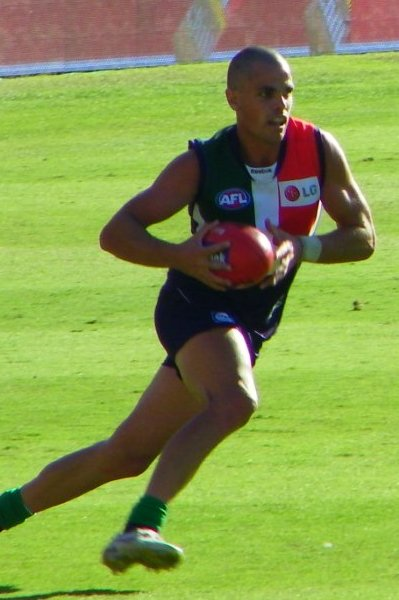
- Peake in April 2009

Personal information
- Full name: Brett Peake
- Born: 5 July 1983 (age 43)
- Original team: East Fremantle (WAFL)
- Draft: No. 43 (F/S), 2003 National draft, Fremantle
- Height: 186 cm (6 ft 1 in)
- Weight: 85 kg (187 lb)
- Position: Midfielder

Playing career^{1}
Years	Club	Games (Goals)
2005–2009	Fremantle	75 (42)
2010–2012	St Kilda	43 (20)
Total		118 (62)

International team honours
Years	Team	Games (Goals)
2006	Australia	2
- ^{1} Playing statistics correct to the end of 2012.

Brett Peake (born 5 July 1983) is a former Australian Rules Footballer who played for the Fremantle Football Club and the St Kilda Football Club. He was traded from Fremantle to St Kilda during the 2009 AFL trade week.

An outside midfielder, he began his senior football career at East Fremantle Football Club in the West Australian Football League (WAFL).

== Career with Fremantle ==
Peake was the first player to be drafted by Fremantle under the father–son rule, utilising selection 43 in the 2003 AFL draft. His father, Brian Peake, played over 400 senior games with East Fremantle, Geelong, Perth and Western Australia between 1972 and 1990.

Peake spent the entire 2004 season playing with East Fremantle. Good form in the WAFL and an extensive injury list at Fremantle saw him make his debut in Round 13 in 2005 against the Kangaroos. He ended the season having played nine of the last ten games. In 2006 Peake became a regular with the Dockers' side, playing 20 games and finishing the season with 10 Brownlow Medal votes. He missed six games in early 2007 with a broken collarbone.

In 2009, he was suspended in June for a discipline breach and was also dropped for the last two games of the season. With concerns over his disposal and lack of two-way play leaving him on the outer at Fremantle, Peake requested a trade at the end of the year.

As his father did in most of his 300 games for East Fremantle, Peake wore the Number 7 guernsey for Fremantle.

== Move to St Kilda ==
During the 2009 trade week Peake was recruited by St Kilda Football Club in exchange for the number 48 pick in the 2009 AFL Draft.

Peake made his debut for the Saints in Round 1, 2010, against Sydney at ANZ Stadium, and had 14 possessions (and a goal) in an eight-point victory.

Peake played 23 games in 2010, including four finals matches.

As of the end of the 2010 AFL season, Peake had played in seven finals matches including two grand finals.

Under the new coach, Scott Watters in 2012, Peake played the first game of the season before being dropped. He was not given another game and was delisted at the end of the season.
