= Llane Spaanderman =

Australian rules footballer (born 1986)

Personal information
- Full name: Llane Spaanderman
- Born: 10 February 1986 (age 40); Perth, Western Australia
- Original team: East Perth
- Draft: 18th overall, 2003 AFL draft 31st overall, 2007 Rookie Draft
- Height: 198 cm (6 ft 6 in)
- Weight: 99 kg (218 lb)
- Position: Ruck/forward

Playing career^{1}
Years	Club	Games (Goals)
2004–2005	Brisbane Lions	3 (1)
2007	West Coast	0 (0)
- ^{1} Playing statistics correct to the end of 2007.

Career highlights
- WAFL Premiership Player: 2010

Llane Spaanderman (born 10 February 1986) is an Australian rules footballer who plays for Mandurah Mustangs Football Club in the Peel Football League (PFL).

Standing at 198 cm and weighing 104 kg, Spaanderman is a well built player who can play both ruck and up forward. When first recruited, he was described as pacy, strong, a good mark and a clean pick up.

As a youngster, he played for Western Australia at the 2003 national titles.

== AFL career ==
He was initially recruited by the Brisbane Lions from East Perth, where he spent much of his time as a forward. Picked up at number 18 in the 2003 AFL draft, Spaanderman spent much of the 2004 AFL season playing in the AFLQ.

Round 6 of the 2005 AFL season marked his Australian Football League (AFL) debut where he made little impact against Essendon. During his time with the Brisbane Lions (2004 and 2005), Spaanderman played three senior games for one goal, 12 disposals, four hit outs and a solitary tackle. His best game, statistically, was in round 20, 2005 against Sydney, when he racked up six possessions and kicked his first goal.

The Brisbane Lions delisted him following the 2005 season, leaving him to play for East Perth during 2006.

== Comeback ==
Spaanderman had a very good season with East Perth, where he matched up well on opponents such as Michael Gardiner and Daniel Bandy. His successful season eventuated in success, as Spaanderman was given a second chance in AFL football – picked up at selection 31 in the 2007 Rookie Draft by the West Coast Eagles. During his time at the Eagles, Spaanderman was found guilty of aggravated burglary relating to an instance that took part prior to his recruitment by the Eagles.

At the end of 2007, Spaanderman was delisted by the West Coast Eagles.

Spaanderman was recruited by Swan Districts in 2008 to play in the ruck.
