= Sean Rusling =

Australian rules footballer, born 1986

Personal information
- Born: 6 October 1986 (age 40); South Australia
- Original team: West Adelaide / Westminster School
- Debut: Round 10, 28 May 2005, Collingwood vs. Hawthorn, at Melbourne Cricket Ground
- Height: 190 cm (6 ft 3 in)
- Weight: 93 kg (205 lb)

Playing career^{1}
Years	Club	Games (Goals)
2005–2008	Collingwood	17 (19)
- ^{1} Playing statistics correct to the end of 2008.

Sean Rusling (born 6 October 1986) is a former professional Australian rules football player who played for Collingwood in the Australian Football League.

His career was plagued by injuries and only managed a total of seventeen games for Collingwood over the course of six years at the club.

== Background ==
A mid-sized forward with an athletics background, Rusling was educated at Westminster School in Adelaide, South Australia. He was recruited from West Adelaide, and was drafted in the 2004 AFL draft by Collingwood in the second round, at No. 23 overall. He made his debut in 2005 against Hawthorn in an injury-riddled side, where he played six games before a shoulder injury ended his season, requiring surgery. He showed his explosive pace and impressive vertical leap to suggest he was a player of the future. With 2006 on the fringes, he re-injured the same shoulder in a pre-season match against Sydney, forcing him out for the first three-four months. A return mid-season in the VFL saw him return after the mid-season break.

== Career ==
He played the last four games, including a final in 2006, damaging Port Adelaide in a half with three goals and many marks on the lead to continue his expectations. Expecting big things in 2007, Rusling once again required a shoulder reconstruction (on the other shoulder) in the pre-season, with his season ruled out. He did however play two half games in the VFL, before an encouraging round 20 comeback game against Melbourne. He kicked a goal in his return, but a week later he dominated the Sydney defence with four goals and 9 marks. He missed the next week with a thigh injury, but returned for finals, kicking another three goals against the Sydney Swans at the Melbourne Cricket Ground (MCG). His ten goals in five games kept hope of a start to a great career.

After a somewhat injury-free pre-season, 2008 saw Rusling play round one against Fremantle at the MCG, but he suffered his fourth serious shoulder injury in as many seasons. Scans revealed the need for a reconstruction, and he missed the remainder of the 2008 season.

Rusling had been making steady progress on his rehabilitation during 2009, however during his VFL comeback match in May, Rusling fractured a cheekbone after a marking contest.

At the age of 23, Rusling announced his retirement from the AFL on 8 September 2010.

Following two years living in Canada, Rusling returned to Australia and signed with South Australian Amateur Football League club Adelaide University.

== See also ==
- Collingwood Football Club roster 2006
