= Peter Street (footballer) =

Australian rules footballer

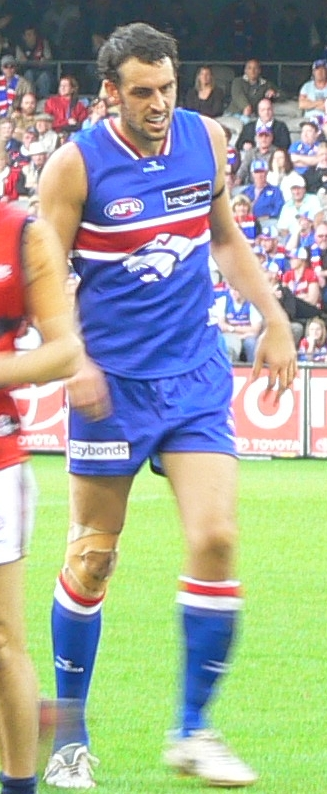

Personal information
- Full name: Peter Street
- Born: 6 June 1980 (age 46)
- Original team: Glenorchy / Tasmania U18
- Draft: 17th overall, 1998; Geelong
- Height: 211 cm (6 ft 11 in)
- Weight: 110 kg (243 lb)

Playing career^{1}
| Years | Club | Games (Goals) |
| 2001 – 2003 | Geelong | 17 (3) |
| 2004 – 2008 | Western Bulldogs | 61 (13) |
| Total | | 78 (16) |
- ^{1} Playing statistics correct to the end of 2008.

Peter Street (born 6 June 1980 in Tasmania) is a former professional Australian rules footballer in the Australian Football League.

At 211 cm (6 ft 11 in) he is the equal tallest player in the history of the VFL/AFL (along with Aaron Sandilands, Mason Cox and Ned Reeves).

Originally drafted by the Geelong Football Club in the 1998 AFL draft, Street was traded to the Western Bulldogs at the end of the 2003 season. The ruckman was considered a cult figure at the Bulldogs, and during the 2006 season, amidst many long-term injuries to the club's taller players, he became an important ruckman for the club.

He was, however, delisted by the Bulldogs in 2008. He was offered a two-year contract by the Brisbane Lions, but decided instead to join Victoria Police.

== Post AFL ==
After his AFL career Street worked as a police officer and is now a Sergeant at the public order response unit.

St Joseph's Football Club announced the signing former Geelong and Western Bulldogs ruckman Peter Street ahead of the 2009 season. Street agreed to a one-year deal and to take on an assistant-coaching role as well as the club's ruck duties. He would continue right until the 2012 season before heading to Lara in 2013. Street played for the Geelong Amateurs in the Bellarine Football League until retiring at the conclusion of the 2016 season.
