= David Trotter =

Australian rules footballer

Personal information
- Born: 4 March 1986 (age 40); Lockhart, New South Wales
- Original team: Calder Cannons/Lockhart
- Debut: Round 18, 2005, Kangaroos vs. Port Adelaide, at Manuka Oval
- Height: 186 cm (6 ft 1 in)
- Weight: 85 kg (187 lb)

Playing career^{1}
Years	Club	Games (Goals)
2005–2007	Kangaroos	7 (2)
- ^{1} Playing statistics correct to the end of 2007.

David Trotter (born 4 March 1986) is a former professional Australian rules footballer who played for the Kangaroos Football Club in the Australian Football League (AFL).

Trotter grew up in Lockhart, New South Wales, a country town west of Wagga Wagga. As a teenager, he attended St. Francis de Sales Regional College in Leeton. He then went on to attend Assumption College in Kilmore, where he played football for the Calder Cannons.

He was picked by the Kangaroos with their first pick, the ninth overall in the 2003 AFL draft.

Trotter made his debut against Port Adelaide in Round 18, 2005 at Manuka Oval. In this tight game, he almost kicked the winning goal. He played the following week against Collingwood.

Trotter was delisted by North Melbourne in October 2007, after playing just the seven games in four years on the Kangaroos' list. He played 46 games and kicked 18 goals in the SANFL with Norwood, making his debut on 21 April 2008, where he was named Norwood's best player on the night. His last game was against Central Districts in the 2010 losing Grand Final.

In August 2011, Trotter joined specialist financial recruitment firm Halliday Marx, based in London, as their International Candidate Manager. In 2013 he joined his former manager Alex McDonald as a player manager in his Hemisphere sports and talent management company.
