= Adam Thomson (Australian footballer) =

Australian rules footballer

Personal information
- Full name: Adam Thomson
- Born: 21 August 1986 (age 40)
- Original team: Sturt (SANFL)
- Draft: 11th overall, 2004 AFL draft
- Height: 184 cm (6 ft 0 in)
- Weight: 84 kg (185 lb)
- Position: Midfielder

Playing career^{1}
Years	Club	Games (Goals)
2005–2008	Port Adelaide	28 (16)
2009–2010	Richmond	4 (1)
Total		32 (17)
- ^{1} Playing statistics correct to the end of 2010.

Adam Thomson (born 21 August 1986) is an Australian rules footballer who played for Port Adelaide and Richmond in the Australian Football League (AFL).

== Career ==
A promising young midfielder, Thomson was taken by Port Adelaide with the 11th selection in the 2004 AFL National Draft. He played just two senior games in 2005, spending most of his time in his first two years at Port Adelaide playing for South Australian National Football League (SANFL) club, Sturt.

In 2006, Thomson played the first three games of the season, but was dropped after the team's listless performance against Fremantle in round 3, although he did manage his first AFL goal during this match. After stand-out performances for Sturt, injuries to senior midfielders and a need to get AFL experience into its young players, Port Adelaide finally selected Thomson in its team against then bottom-side Essendon in round 9. Thomson and many other Port Adelaide youngsters showed their potential in this game. His impressive form in the following rounds of 2006 were halted when he suffered a groin injury against North Melbourne in round 18, effectively ending his season.

In 2008, Thomson struggled to keep a place in Port's starting team.

At the end of the 2008 AFL season, Thomson requested to be traded to another club due to lack of opportunity.

During the 2008 Trade Week, Thomson was traded to Richmond in return for draft pick number 42.

Thomson was delisted by Richmond on 14 October 2010, after playing only four senior games in his two seasons at the club.

== Personal life ==
Thomson was legendary for his love of chicken rolls from a local chicken shop during his career at Port Adelaide, and would often travel to the local movies with teammates to watch a film. He also had a bizarre ritual of wearing a hoodie and tracksuit pants while undertaking high-intensity training sessions.
