= Jay Nash (footballer) =

Australian rules footballer

Personal information
- Born: 21 December 1985 (age 40); South Australia
- Original team: Central District (SANFL)
- Debut: Round 16, 15 July 2005, Essendon vs. Collingwood, at the MCG
- Height: 188 cm (6 ft 2 in)
- Weight: 88 kg (194 lb)

Playing career^{1}
Years	Club	Games (Goals)
2005–2009	Essendon	43 (10)
2010	Port Adelaide	8 (0)
Total		51 (10)
- ^{1} Playing statistics correct to the end of 2010.

Career highlights
- Central District Premiership 2010

Jay Nash (born 21 December 1985) is a former Australian rules footballer who played for the Essendon Football Club and Port Adelaide Football Club in the Australian Football League (AFL).

== Career ==
Nash began his career in South Australia, where he played for the Central District Football Club. As a young player, he played for the Nuriootpa Rover Football Club, in the Barossa Light & Gawler Football Association.

He was drafted by Essendon Football Club in the 2003 AFL draft at Pick 28.

In Essendon's round 16 win against Collingwood in 2005, defender Andrew Welsh was unable to take his place on the field. Nash was called in to replace him only hours before the match was scheduled to begin and he was lined up against Collingwood's captain Nathan Buckley.

Nash played 43 games and kicked ten goals during his career at Essendon. He played a career high 21 games in the 2008 season, but only 2 games in 2009, as he struggled with foot injuries.

On 8 October 2009, Nash was traded to Port Adelaide in a four-team deal, which included Shaun Burgoyne. Nash made his Port Adelaide debut against Melbourne Demons in round 9, 2010. He was delisted by the club at season's end.

For the 2014 season he returned to his junior club, the Nuriootpa Rover Football Club.
