= Ben Eckermann =

Australian rules football midfielder

Personal information
- Full name: Ben Eckermann
- Born: 12 March 1987 (age 39)
- Original team: Sturt (SANFL) / Port Adelaide
- Draft: 51st overall, 2004; Port Adelaide
- Height: 178 cm (5 ft 10 in)
- Weight: 79 kg (174 lb)

Playing career^{1}
Years	Club	Games (Goals)
2005 – 2006	Port Adelaide	4 (0)
- ^{1} Playing statistics correct to the end of 2011.

Ben Eckermann (born 12 March 1987) is an Australian rules football midfielder who played for Port Adelaide in the Australian Football League (AFL) and Sturt in the South Australian National Football League (SANFL).

Eckermann was selected with the 51st pick in the 2004 AFL draft and made his AFL debut in Round Seven of the 2005 AFL season. In his fourth game Eckermann was concussed when he was bumped front-on by West Coast Eagles player Tyson Stenglein. The incident was seen as a precursor to stronger penalties for front-on contact to the head. Eckermann suffered ongoing concussion issues thereafter and did not pay another senior AFL match, and he was delisted at the end of the 2006 season.
