= Brent Hall =

Australian rules footballer, born 1986

Personal information
- Born: 7 January 1986 (age 40); Western Australia
- Original team: South Fremantle (WAFL)
- Debut: Round 16, 15 July 2005, Collingwood vs. Essendon, at Melbourne Cricket Ground

Playing career^{1}
Years	Club	Games (Goals)
2005	Collingwood	1 (0)
- ^{1} Playing statistics correct to the end of 2005.

Brent Hall (born 7 January 1986) is an Australian rules footballer in the Australian Football League.

A big man, Hall was drafted by Collingwood in the 2003 National Draft. He was given time to develop at Williamstown during his first season at the club, but he did not show too much form. Used as a key position player at both ends of the ground in 2005 in the VFL, he was lucky to make his debut due to lack of height. Playing as a ruckman, he spent little time on the ground, having little impact.

He would be kept on the list in 2006 but did not manage to play any games for the club, and was delisted at the end of the year.
