= Ryan Cook (Australian rules footballer) =

Australian rules footballer

Personal information
- Born: 16 February 1988 (age 38)
- Original team: Rosebud/Dandenong U18
- Debut: Round 18, 4 August 2007, Collingwood vs. Carlton, at Melbourne Cricket Ground
- Height: 186 cm (6 ft 1 in)
- Weight: 82 kg (181 lb)

Playing career^{1}
Years	Club	Games (Goals)
2007–2009	Collingwood	14 (1)
- ^{1} Playing statistics correct to the end of 2009.

Career highlights
- Joseph Wren Memorial Trophy 2009

Ryan Cook (born 16 February 1988) is an Australian rules footballer who played for the Collingwood Football Club in the Australian Football League (AFL) between 2006 and 2010.

He is a lively midfielder/half-forward who kicked three goals and had 19 disposals to be one of the Dandenong Stingrays' best in their losing TAC Cup Grand Final against Gippsland Power. The Magpies' fourth pick at 23 in the 2005 AFL draft, Cook was touted as a fast player with great endurance, as evidenced by a 13.7 beep test result.

His step brother is Nick Malceski who plays for Sydney Swans.

He was delisted by Collingwood at the end of the 2010 season. He then moved to Western Australia to play for South Fremantle Football Club in the West Australian Football League. He won South Fremantle's best and fairest award, the W. J. Hughes Medal, for the 2011 season.
