= Ruck (Australian rules football) =

Playing position in Australian rules football

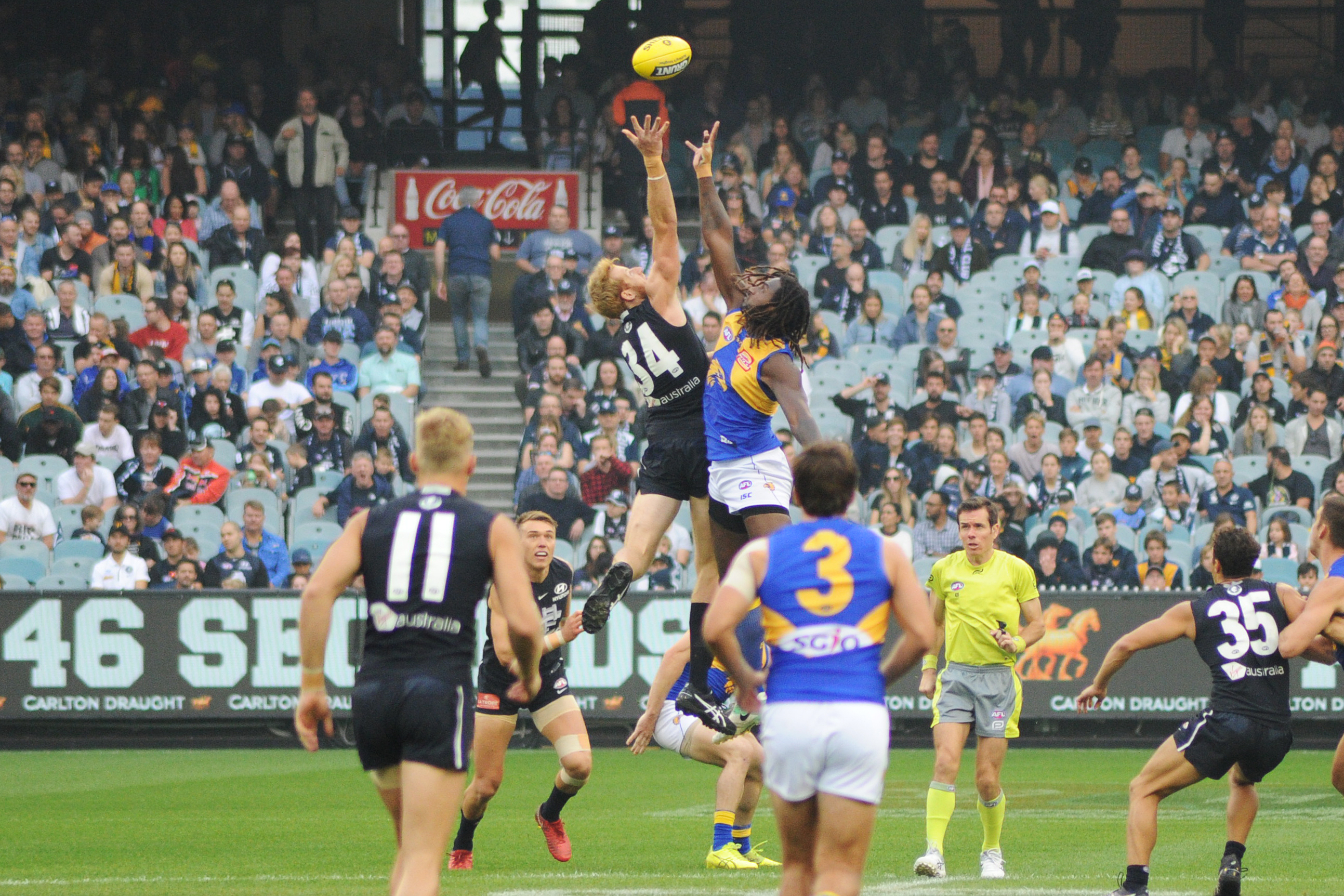
A ruck contest from an AFL match in 2018. Andrew Phillips (left) and Nic Naitanui (right) contest a ball up from the umpire (in green) while players below await the tap.

In Australian rules football, the ruck is the name given to both the contests for the ball initiated by a field umpire to commence play, and to the players' specialist position who nominate to contest them (sometimes gendered as a ruckman/ruckwoman). The ruck occurs at centre bounces and stoppages when the umpire sends the ball into the air during a ball-up or a boundary throw-in. According to the laws of Australian Football only a nominated ruck may contest the ruck. The rucks are among the most important players on the field as they are the first to set up play for their team. As reach is instrumental to winning ruck contests, height, arm span, vertical leap and endurance are huge physical advantages and so the rucks are usually the tallest on each team.

The role of the ruck in Australian rules is similar to a lock in rugby union contesting a line-out. The key differences are that with the exception of boundary throw-ins, the ball is almost always thrown straight up high into the air rather than horizontally, so in this respect, the ruck is similar to a basketball centre. The ruck needs to be able to control the ball by palm tap or fist with outstretched arms. Unlike rugby, the ruck must rely on vertical leap because lifting teammates is not allowed. Australian football rucking often involves vigorous mid-air collisions with the opposing ruck.

With no offside or knock on rules, the ruck can tap the ball in any direction. Before a bounce down or ball up, rucks confer with the onballers (rovers and ruck-rovers) to pre-determine the direction of the tap so that they can position themselves to best receive it to the team's advantage.

The ruck is typically the tallest player on either team. A typical professional Australian Football League ruck is over 200 cm or 6'7. While teams historically would play one primary ruck, the relaxation of interchange and substitution rules at the professional level has allowed teams to select players for multiple ruck roles and tactics.

When a ruck beats their opponent by contacting the ball, it is called a hit out and measured as a statistic and performance indicator of effective ruckwork. Although the ruck is the primary player to score hit-outs, sometimes tall key position players fill in for the ruck around the ground if the ruck cannot run to make the contest in time.

Rucking is one of the most physically demanding positions on the ground, both in terms of fitness and body contact. As a result of the high level of physical contact of clashing with opponents in the air, many rucks have large physiques or bulk up to prevent injury. As well, due to the use of knees when jumping, many rucks wear protective thigh and shin padding, whereas players in other positions rarely do. Coaches often field more than one ruck and rotate them due to the physical pressure of the position and the endurance of having to run to ruck contests around the ground.

== Ruck styles ==
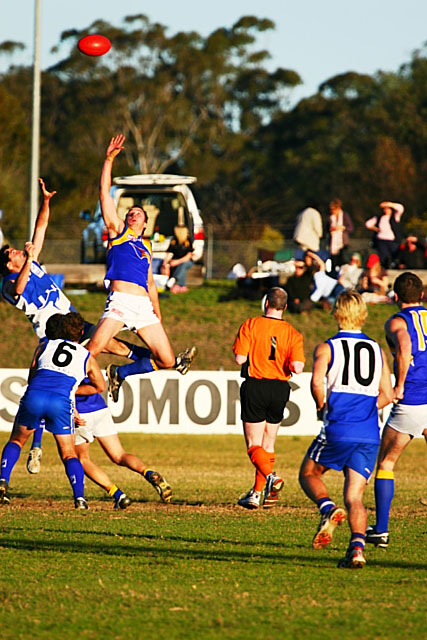
Two rucks contest the bounce in a suburban western Sydney AFL game between the East Coast Eagles AFC and Campbelltown Kangaroos AFC

Rucks are sometimes classified by their style of play, although many players alternate styles during a game based on strategy, the style of an opponent, their physical attributes and versatility.

A tap ruck (or palm ruck) requires the player to do a high leap. Players using this style will deftly palm the ball directly down to the advantage of a smaller teammate or rover, often making their hitouts the more effective. WAFL and VFL great Polly Farmer is considered to be one of the best all-time rucks of this style. The AFL's Aaron Sandilands is a good recent example.

A mobile ruck (or mobile bigman) often describes a ruck that covers a lot of ground. Sometime this type of ruck is not as tall, as big, or effective at hit outs, but may possess a high leap and greater athletic endurance. Against less mobile rucks, this type of player can compensate with an ability to take more marks around the ground playing effectively as a tall ruck rover and sometimes with the additional ability to kick goals while playing from the midfield or drop back into defence when required. During the 1980s and 1990s this style became dominant among professional teams and Jim Stynes was one of the first in this mould. Stynes and Scott Wynd won successive Brownlow medals playing this role, the last two rucks to be awarded the honour. Most contemporary professional rucks are considered mobile rucks and require the athletic endurance to cover the entire ground.

A heavy ruck (or thump ruck) practices a more physical style of rucking. Typically, the bulkier player uses brute force (and a style often referred to as "crash and bash") to take their opponent out of the contest and punch the ball forward, often going for distance and penetration into their attacking zone. These players are typically slower around the ground and less inclined to jump, as such are sometimes referred to as "dinosaurs" and sometimes criticised for a lack of skill around the ground. Heavy rucks became the dominant rucks in the VFL/AFL in the 1890s and also the 1960s and 1970s. The early 2000s saw a brief revival of the style as the addition of third and fourth interchange players by 1998 enabled sides to field multiple rucks. One of the last successful heavy rucks to feature prominently was Clark Keating, who, despite giving away significant height and leap to his opponents, used his bulky 197 cm and 103 kg frame to help the Brisbane Lions to three successive premierships starting from 2001. At the beginning of 2003, the AFL rules were changed so that rucks must stand at opposite sides and run towards each other. This neutralised the advantage of this type of ruckman who was no longer able to outbody their opponents, with players now required to maximise their jump and reach if they are to win the tap. While some such as Brendon Lade were able to successfully adapt, the rule changes helped end the careers of the likes of Keating and many others and saw a generation of taller and athletic mobile rucks dominate.

A backup ruck (or pinch hitting ruck) is a support ruck used in short bursts to test the endurance of their opponents. This is most often used during 'pinches'—periods of frequent defensive stoppages at critical points in the game. They are rested on the bench or the forward line for long periods or rotated into the ruck and function to both relieve the primary ruck and use short burts of power to overwhelm exhausted opponents. They often lack the height and endurance of a primary ruckman but can be used to effectively neutralise a dominant ruck over the course of a game. This style came into prominence since the 1990s as the AFL gradually increased the interchange from 2 players to 5 allowing an additional spot for one or more rucks. Initially heavy rucks were often designated pinch hitters until the centre bounce rules were changed in 2003. During the 2010s, substitute rucks and taller forwards would often combine as pinch hitters.

== Strategies using rucks ==
Rucks are often used by coaches strategically.

=== Attacking strategies ===
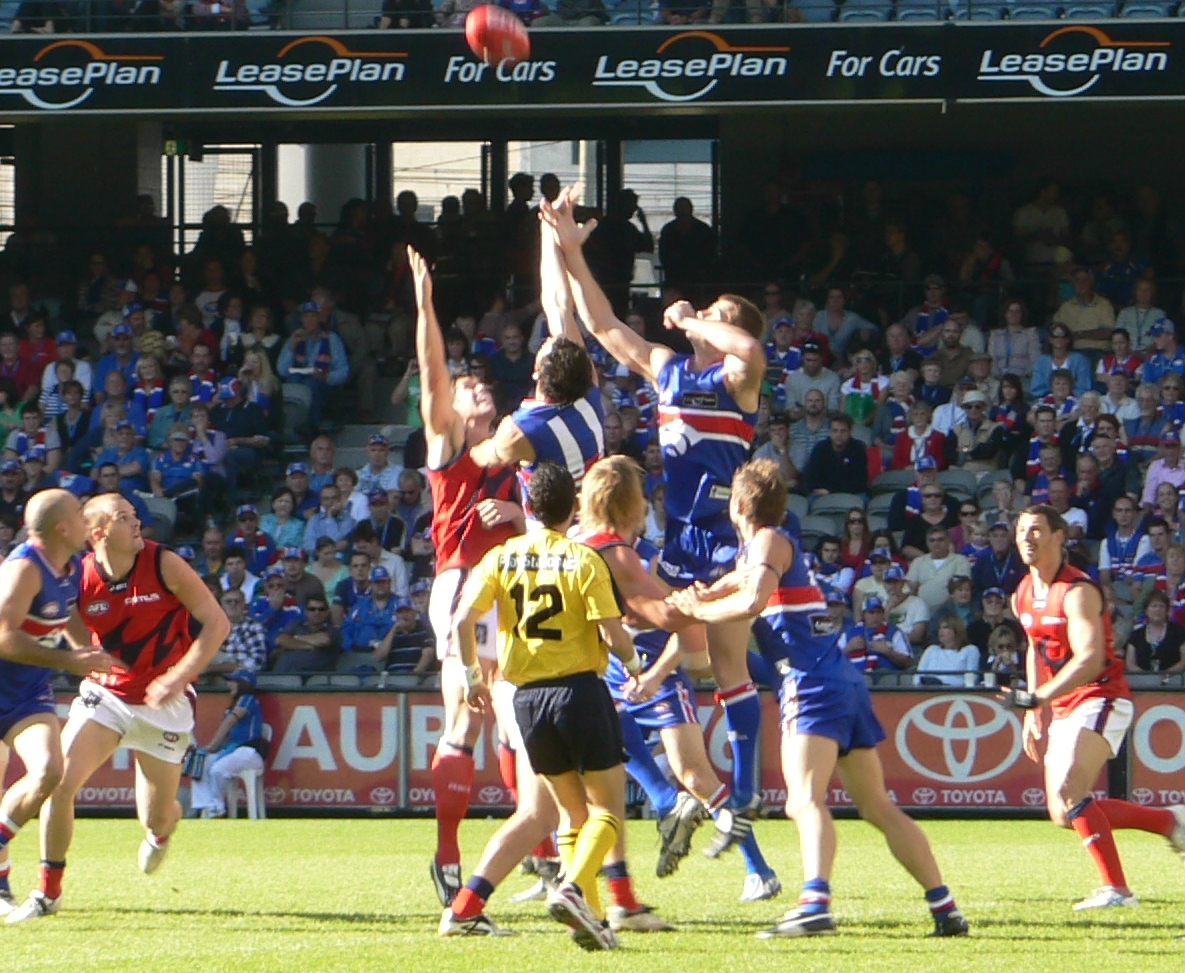
A Western Bulldogs player rises over the top of the two designated rucks to employ a tandem "third man up" ruckwork strategy in an AFL match in 2007 at the Telstra Dome in Melbourne. A decade later this would be made illegal by the AFL.

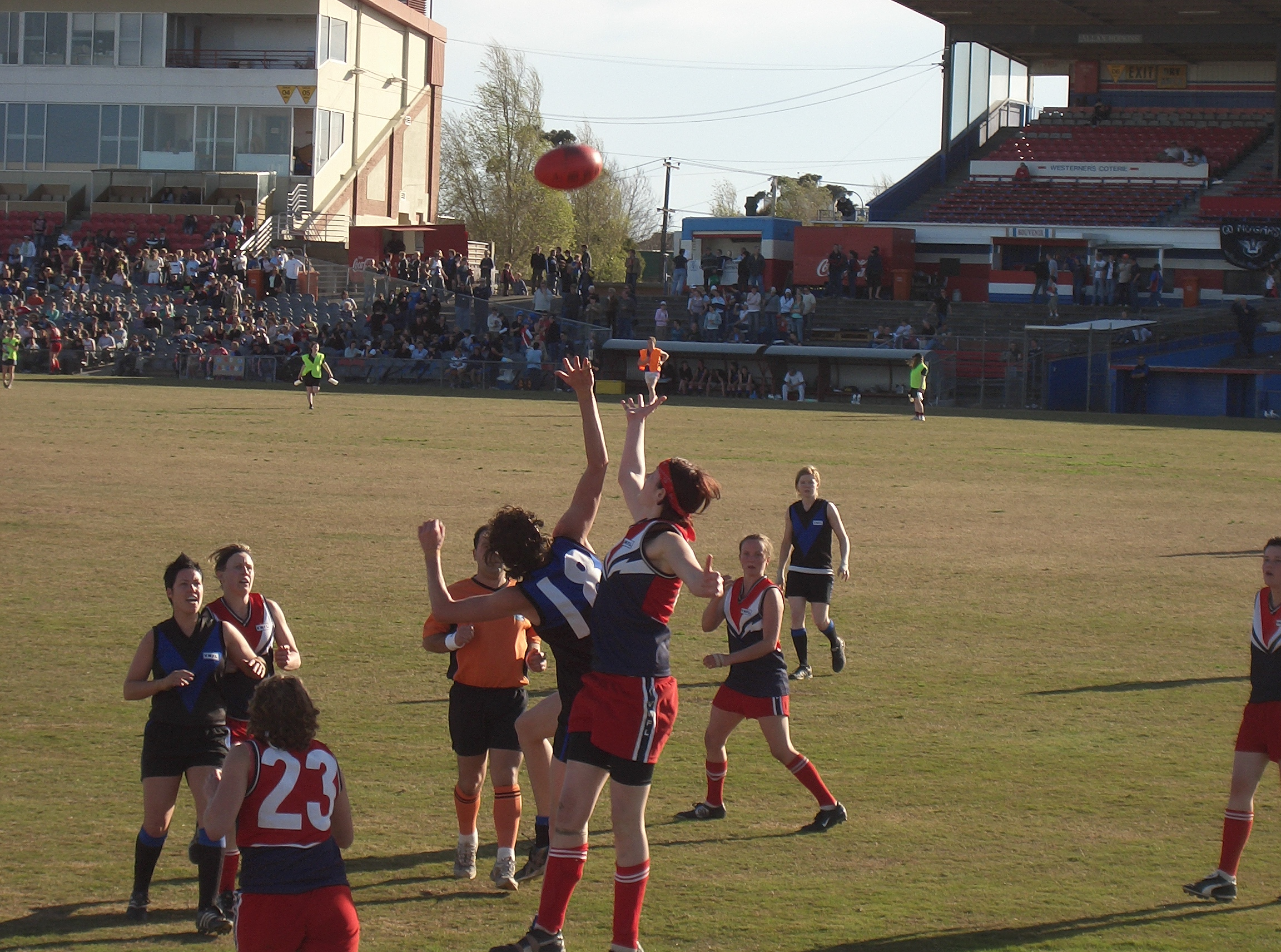
A ruck contest after an umpire ball-up during a women's game. Players surround the contest, waiting for the tap.

Using tandem rucks, often known as third man up, is a tactic often employed around the ground as a set play strategy (though was made illegal by the AFL from 2016). As only one ruck from each side can be used at centre bounces, this tactic is restricted to boundary throw-ins and bounces. It involves a second tall or high jumping player from one of the sides contesting the ruck, typically when the taller rucks are wrestling at ground level or consistently ineffective in getting a clear tap away. The tactic became especially popular during the 2015 season. It often results in a thump forward to keep the ball moving towards goal, as it is difficult for the shorter player contesting the ruck to aim a tap. This is because they are not able to be assisted by lifting and can often be put off balance in the air when jumping over the top of rucks. Additionally, by committing an extra player to the ruck contest, there is one less player from that team around the contest - though this can also have the effect of opening up space for more creative roving players. Some key position players are designated secondary rucks for boundary throw-ins and will sometimes be used in tandem ruckwork.

During kick-ins the ruck can sometimes be a designated target. With extra height it is difficult for opposition players to take marks against them and they are an easier target to spot in a cluster. However, the AFL's introduction of Gaelic Football's quick kick-in rule in 2006 tended to favour shorter passes to smaller players over set plays with high kicks involving the ruck.

In a contested situation, the ruck may be instructed to "bring the ball to ground", so that the smaller rovers or crumbers on their team know to attack the ball from front and square positions to gain possession. This strategy is particularly effective when playing in wet weather where the slippery ball and tighter contests make it more difficult for the ruck to take clean possession.

Rucks are sometimes dropped into the goal square during an attack on goals from outside scoring distance. This way they become a tall marking target if a player decides to "bomb" a kick into the goal square. The term resting ruck is used when a ruck is played in the forward line between stints in the ruck. As the ruck requires almost constant running, "resting" in the forward line gives the ruck much needed breaks and with their heights they do not need to run or lead as much into space to contest marks when the ball does reach the forward line.

=== Defensive strategies ===
Some coaches instruct rucks to drop back into the hole, which effectively is the open space in which a full-forward might lead. This way the tall player can cut off a low pass designed to hit a full-forward. Standing in the road of a large key forward leading out at full speed requires a lot of courage.

Rucks will sometimes be designated to stand the mark when an opposition takes a kick on goal. The extra height of the ruck means that the player has to kick higher, meaning more chance of missing, dropping short or even the possibility of actually kicking into the man on the mark (called a smother).

When an opposition player is having a set shot at goal, particularly from a long distance or on an acute angle, the ruck may be instructed to run all the way to the goal square to protect it, temporarily playing a similar role to a goalkeeper in soccer or gaelic football. Despite no height limit for the goal, the ball will always have a curved trajectory and many kicks tend to drop short. Being the tallest player, it gives the ruck the best opportunity of any player to touch the ball before it goes through the goal posts and create an obstacle in area of goal to kick through. This can result in a behind instead of a goal and save 5 points, or can remain in the field of play with no score.

== Ruck history and rules ==
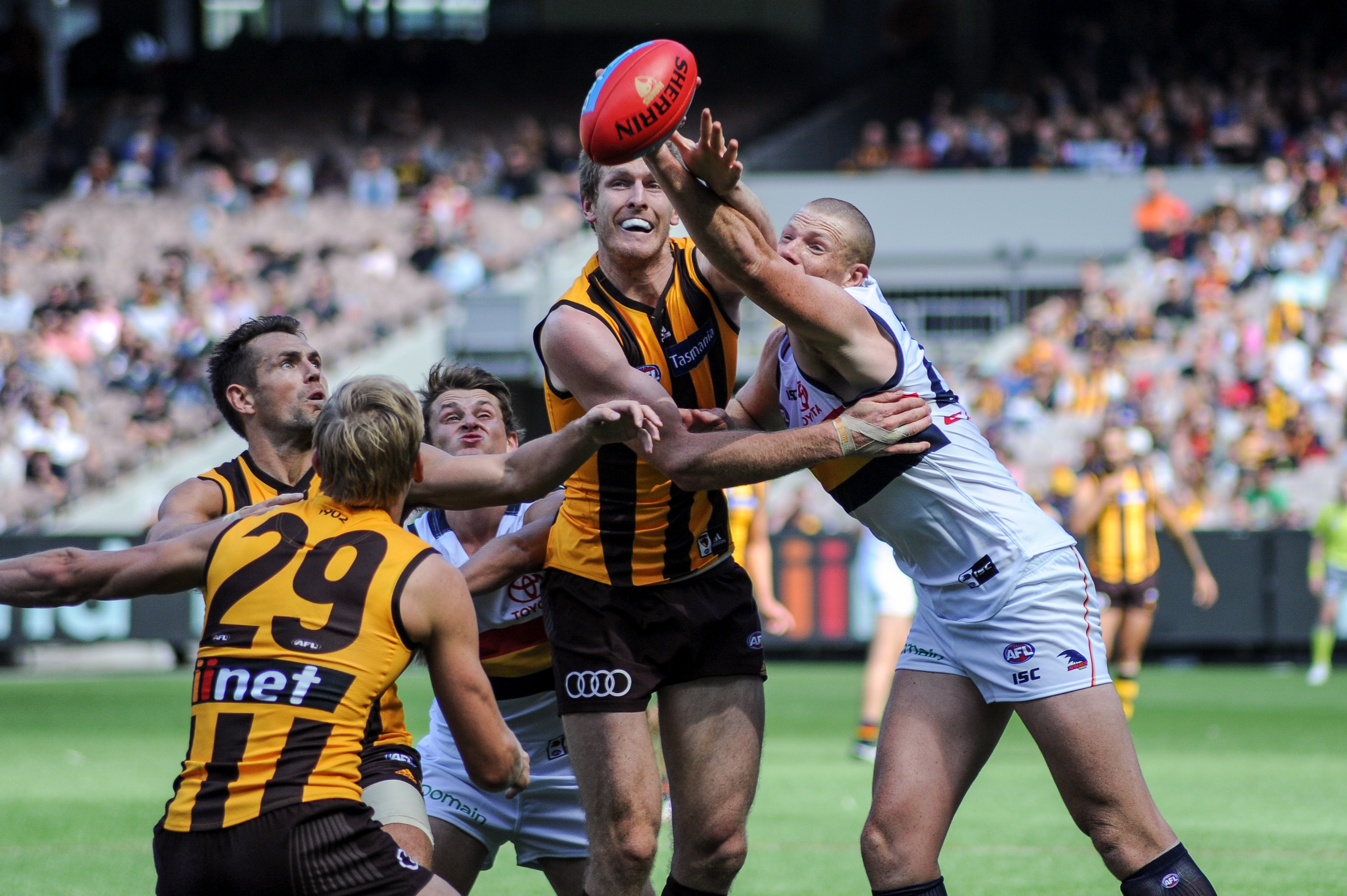
A ruck contest occurs in a 2017 AFL match between Hawthorn and Adelaide.

The ball-up has been a feature of the Laws of the Game since 1872, necessitating a "ruck" with the term entering the Australian rules vernacular around 1876. The term for the player was not initially gendered, "ruck-man" or "ruckman" did not enter general use until early in the 20th century (circa 1903). Bouncing the ball for the ruck became common from as early as 1880; the rules formally changed to a mandate a bounce in 1887.

In 2004, a new centre circle rule was introduced to reduce the ruck's run-up. The aim was to decrease the knee clashes and posterior cruciate ligament injuries experienced by many rucks. The new rules favour taller players and those with high vertical leaps, and many mobile rucks now find it difficult to contest.

During the 2008 AFL season, the AFL introduced an additional two boundary umpires which many labelled the "quick throw-in" rule. Designed to make the game faster and more attractive for television viewers, this new rule had the unintended effect of many professional rucks no longer being able to contest boundary throw-ins.

The practice of "third man up" was outlawed for the 2017 season and beyond, in order to protect rucks. A player from each team must be "nominated" at each ruck contest, and only the nominated players can contest the ruck. No other player may come into contact with the ball until it has been hit by either ruck or until the ball hits the ground, or they will have a "ruck infringement" free kick given against them. Due to initial practice phase during the JLT Community Series, many free kicks were given against players who accidentally came into contact with the ball, especially when they were not watching the contest. A notable example of this was when Adelaide Crows player Dean Gore was penalised after the ball hit him before it had been cleared. Gore was facing away from the contest. As a direct result of this and other similar incidents, the AFL clarified the rule, so that if the field umpire concluded that a player genuinely contacted the ball accidentally, a play on would be called.

== Modern rucks ==
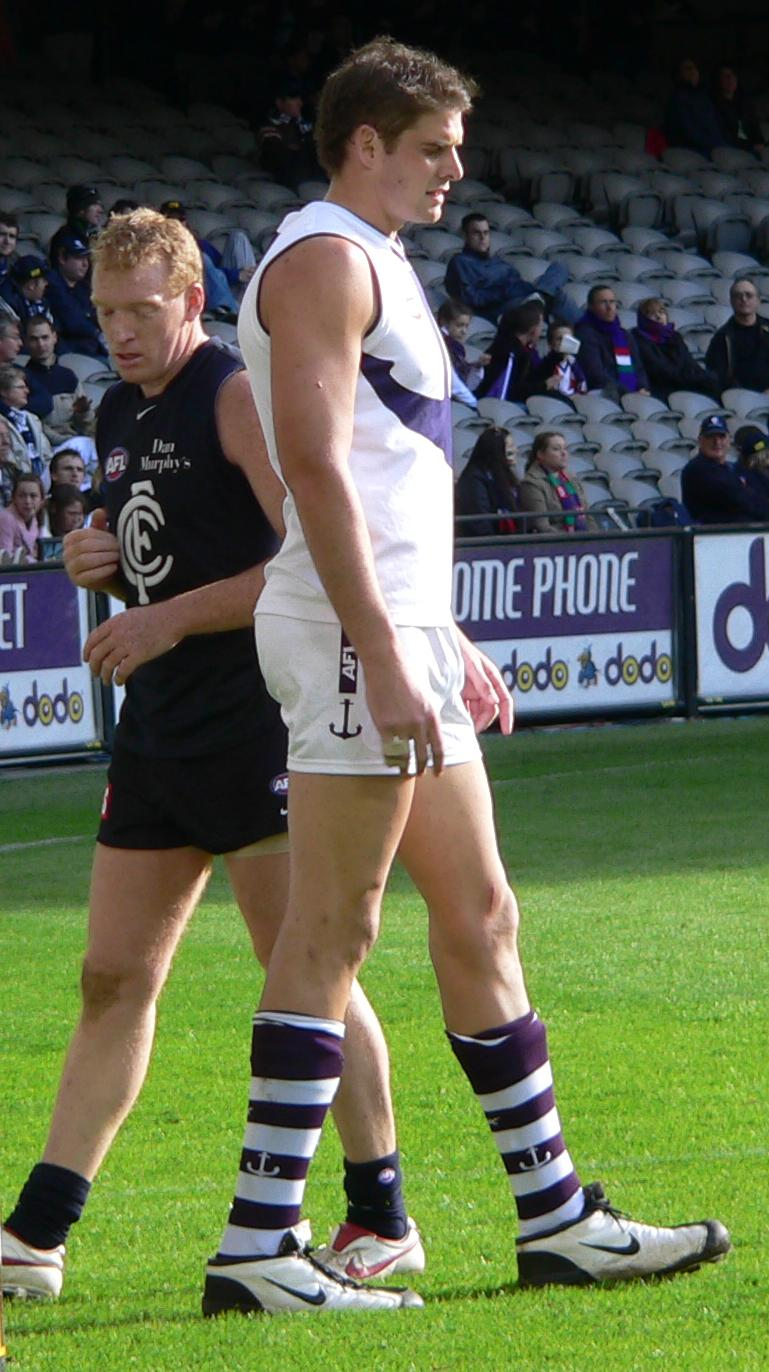
Standing at 211 cm (6 ft 11 in) tall, Aaron Sandilands (right) of the Fremantle Dockers makes for an effective ruck.

Examples of modern-day rucks in the Australian Football League include Max Gawn, Brodie Grundy, Nic Naitanui and Todd Goldstein.

Aaron Sandilands stood at 2.11 m (6 ft 11 in) which was the equal tallest (along with Peter Street, Mason Cox and Ned Reeves) ruck in AFL/VFL history and was considered to be one of the most dominant rucks in the game.

== Recruitment and converts from other sports ==
Due to the requirement for rucks to be very tall, in recent years clubs have often gone outside of the traditional junior football leagues to recruit rucks. Cameron Jackson was recruited by Fremantle in the 1998 Rookie Draft after previously playing in the National Basketball League, but never played an AFL game. Dean Brogan who was picked by Port Adelaide with the 26th selection in the 1999 AFL draft was much more successful, with Brogan playing for Port for 12 seasons and playing 174 games, including the being a member of the winning 2004 AFL Grand Final team. He had previously won an NBL championship with the Adelaide 36ers. Other basketballers such as David Fanning (Cairns Taipans and Collingwood), Daniel Bass (Metropolitan State University of Denver and Port Adelaide), Seamus McNamara (Marist College, TSV Dachau Spurs and Collingwood), Alex Starling (Bethune-Cookman University and Sydney) and Ben Dowell (Santa Clara University and Adelaide) have all been recruited, but have not been as successful as Brogan in adapting to Australian football at the AFL level. Another non-traditional recruit, Mike Pyke (Canada rugby union, US Montauban and Sydney), has enjoyed somewhat more AFL success than most of the aforementioned basketballers. Jason Holmes was also recruited from a college basketball background and became the first Americans to play in the AFL. The aforementioned Mason Cox (Oklahoma State University basketball and Collingwood) has also had a solid career to date.

== See also ==
- Follower (Australian rules football)
