= Leigh Ryswyk =

Australian rules footballer (born 1985)

Personal information
- Full name: Leigh Ryswyk
- Born: 16 January 1985 (age 41); Geelong, Victoria, Australia
- Original team: Southport
- Height: 179 cm (5 ft 10 in)
- Weight: 74 kg (163 lb)
- Position: half forward

Playing career^{1}
Years	Club	Games (Goals)
2004-2005	Brisbane Lions	1 (0)
- ^{1} Playing statistics correct to the end of 2005.

Leigh John Ryswyk (born 16 January 1985), nicknamed "Rizza" and "Leroy", is a former professional Australian rules footballer who played with the Brisbane Lions in the Australian Football League (AFL).

A half-forward / wingman, he was selected in the 2003 rookie draft. Despite not managing a senior debut in his first year, he impressed playing on the wing for reserves side Southport and was elevated from the rookie list prior to the 2005 AFL season, when he debuted in round 11. He played one game at this level, accruing four disposals, before being delisted at season's end owing to injury. He relocated to South Australia in 2006 to play for North Adelaide in the South Australian National Football League (SANFL), where he played 226 games for the club between 2006 and 2018, receiving both North Adelaide and SANFL life membership.

Ryswyk came out as gay in March 2026, becoming the first former AFL player to do so publicly.

== Early life ==
Leigh John Ryswyk was born in Geelong, Victoria, on 16 January 1985. of parents John and Debbie. He has three siblings, and his grandparents were Dutch. At the age of six he moved to the Gold Coast, Queensland. The family lived at Worongary.

As a child he played in the Under-8s team at Labrador FC, and moved to the Southport Sharks aged 11. He represented Queensland representative in Under-15, Under-16, Under-18, and Open level teams, and played two years of senior football at Southport. At 17 he was a senior QAFL player.

He represented his adopted state in the 2003 Under-18 Championship.

== Football career ==
In 2004 Ryswyk played with the Suncoast Lions (later renamed Brisbane Lions) in the QAFL, and represented Queensland against the ACT in Canberra, kicking three goals for the winning side.

After impressing on the wing for Southport, he was elevated from the rookie list prior to the 2005 AFL season and was one of only two Queenslanders invited to the AFL Draft Camp.

=== AFL ===
Ryswyk made his debut in round 11 in 2005, against Fremantle at Subiaco Oval. He had four disposals, three of which were score assists, in a convincing win for the Lions.

A quad strain led to his being sidelined for 8 weeks, and he was delisted at the end of the season.

=== South Australia ===
Ryswyk moved to South Australia in 2006 after being recruited by coach Andrew Jarman to North Adelaide in the South Australian National Football League, where he was nicknamed "Leroy" and "Rizza". He played in jumper no. 32. Between 2006 and 2018 he played 226 games for the club, kicking 223 goals. He represented the South Australia four times in matches against interstate second-tier leagues, kicking ten goals. In 2018 he made important contributions to the club's Reserves Premiership, despite having experienced rib fractures late in the home and away season.

Since 2019 Ryswyk has been playing in the Barossa Light & Gawler Football Association (BLGFA) playing for Barossa District Football Club,.

== Recognition ==
Ryswyk was 4th Best Player in 2011, and a member of The Advertiser Team of the Year in 2006.

He qualified for North Adelaide FC Life Membership in 2016, and for SANFL Life Membership in 2017.

In August 2023, he was inducted into the Queensland Football Hall of Fame, which is hosted by AFLQ.

Ryswyk has won two best and fairest awards, playing for Barossa Districts, in 2019 and 2020.

In 2019 he captained the Northern team’s win in the SA Country Championships, being named joint player of the carnival. He was selected in the SA Country state team to play against WA at Optus Stadium where he kicked three goals.

== Personal life ==
Early in his career with North Adelaide, Ryswyk was working at a drive-through bottleshop when he was held up by an armed robber, but was not physically harmed after handing over all the cash in the till.

In 2018 Ryswyk's occupation was listed as "home lender". He was living in Gawler and playing for Barossa District in 2023. He has two children.

In an interview with Melbourne community radio station JOY 94.9 on 25 March 2026, Ryswyk came out as gay, making him the first former AFL player to do so. (Note: Seven months earlier, former West Coast Eagles player Mitch Brown had came out as bisexual.) Most of his friends had already known that he was gay for around five years, and he had taken three years before coming out to his parents, who were supportive. Speaking on radio afterwards, he said that he had received overwhelming support since coming out. He said that the time was not right for him to come out during his AFL career, adding "while AFL clubs and the AFL community would largely be supportive of queer players, crowd behaviour could be a factor in why many did not feel comfortable being openly gay". Brisbane Lions and North Adelaide Football Club both released statements of support.
