= Guy Richards =

Australian rules footballer, born 1983

Personal information
- Born: 21 March 1983 (age 43)
- Original team: Coldstream/Eastern U18
- Debut: Round 2, 3 April 2004, Collingwood vs. Western Bulldogs, at Melbourne Cricket Ground

Playing career^{1}
Years	Club	Games (Goals)
2004–2007	Collingwood	39 (3)
- ^{1} Playing statistics correct to the end of 2007.

Career highlights
- AFL Rising Star nominee 2004; Harry Collier Trophy 2004

Guy Richards (born 21 March 1983) is an Australian rules footballer in the Australian Football League.

From Coldstream, Richards was drafted in the 2000 National Draft to Collingwood. While he developed into a good tap ruckman, Richards was injury plagued early in his career and did not make his senior debut until the 2004 AFL season.

Richards played 12 games in 2004 before a groin injury ended his season but still won the Harry Collier Trophy for the best first year player at Collingwood. A knee and then hip injury kept Richards out until the final two games of 2005 and in 2006 played only 9 games.

In 2007 saw Richards vie with Carlton import Chris Bryan for the role as Josh Fraser's deputy ruckman. With the arrival of Cameron Wood via the 2007 Trade period Richards was delisted by Collingwood
