= Adam Iacobucci =

Australian rules footballer (born 1986)

Personal information
- Born: 17 January 1986 (age 40)
- Original team: St Bernards / Calder U18 (TAC Cup)
- Debut: Round 6, 1 May 2005, Collingwood vs. St Kilda, at Melbourne Cricket Ground

Playing career^{1}
Years	Club	Games (Goals)
2005–2006	Collingwood	4 (0)
- ^{1} Playing statistics correct to the end of 2006.

Career highlights
- Northern Bullants captain, 2009-2011; 2007 Laurie Hill Trophy; 2006 Joseph Wren Memorial Trophy (Best VFL Player)

Adam Iacobucci (born 17 January 1986) is an Australian rules footballer, who formerly played for the Collingwood Football Club in the Australian Football League, and captained the Northern Bullants in the Victorian Football League

Drafted by Collingwood in the 2004 AFL draft, he is a small in and under midfielder, who impressed coach Mick Malthouse early in his debut season, getting a senior spot in Round 6. He played a few more games for the Magpies before the football club delisted him, its patience frayed by his inconsistent performances. Nevertheless, he was named as Collingwood's best VFL player in 2006 (playing with the Williamstown Seagulls, at the time the VFL-affiliate to Collingwood), winning the Joseph Wren Memorial Trophy for his efforts. He played a total of four games for Collingwood and thirty games for Williamstown over this time.

Following his departure from Collingwood, Iacobucci shifted to the Northern Bullants in the 2007 season. He quickly became one of the Bullants consistent players, winning the Laurie Hill Trophy as club best and fairest in 2007. He was a member of the VFL representative team in 2007, 2008 and 2010. In 2009, Iacobucci was made club captain, and served in the role for three seasons. As captain, Iacobucci led the Bullants to back-to-back grand finals in 2009–10, but the club lost against North Ballarat on both occasions. Iacobucci left the Bullants at the end of 2011.

Iacobucci moved to Strathmore in the Essendon District Football League in 2012, where he played until 2025 and became a life member for strathmore football club in early 2026.
