= Daniel McConnell (footballer) =

Australian rules footballer

Personal information
- Full name: Daniel McConnell
- Born: 21 June 1986 (age 40)
- Original team: Eastern Ranges
- Height: 191 cm (6 ft 3 in)
- Weight: 93.3 kg (206 lb)

Playing career^{1}
| Years | Club | Games (Goals) |
| 2005 | West Coast Eagles | 2 (0) |
| 2006 | Kangaroos | 4 (0) |
| Total | | 6 (0) |
- ^{1} Playing statistics correct to the end of 2006.

Daniel McConnell (born 21 June 1986) is a former member of the West Coast Eagles Australian Football League club. He was taken at pick 26 in the 2003 AFL draft by the West Coast Eagles, a second round selection.

He was traded to the Roos at the end of the 2005 season, in exchange for pick 13 (Shannon Hurn) and 29 (Ben McKinley).
