= Courtney Johns =

Australian rules footballer

Personal information
- Born: 14 November 1984 (age 41)
- Original team: East Fremantle
- Height: 194 cm (6 ft 4 in)
- Weight: 100 kg (220 lb)

Playing career^{1}
Years	Club	Games (Goals)
2005–2008	Essendon	21 (18)
- ^{1} Playing statistics correct to the end of 2008.

Courtney Johns (born 14 November 1984) is a former professional Australian rules football player who played for the Essendon Football Club in the Australian Football League (AFL).

== Early career ==
Johns was recruited by Essendon from East Fremantle. A career threatening fractured labrum in his draft year (2002 rookie draft) which kept him from the playing field for over two years. The injury left doubts that he would ever run again, let alone play football.

He had several surgeries to remove floating bone fragments from his distraught left hip, prolonged rehabilitation and a modified training regime to make an apparent full recovery. He was elevated to senior level at Essendon in 2005.

== AFL career ==
=== 2006 ===
He suffered a rib injury after the round 14 game against Fremantle, where he showed good signs in his best game for the club until that stage - booting 3 goals and taking 7 marks.

When he made his return in round 19, he continued to show good signs with another 3 goal haul against Collingwood, helping to result in Essendon's third win for the season.

Round 20 against Hawthorn saw him kick no goals and have little impact as in previous games that season. He made up for it to some extent by kicking a goal against Richmond in round 21. The Bombers last game for the season was against the Western Bulldogs, though they had nothing to play for except a win, Essendon fought hard and Johns kicked his last goal for the season.

=== 2007 ===
In round 4, Johns' first match for the season, he did not make much of an impact but in his second match on Anzac Day he booted two crucial goals, one from the boundary and on the edge of the fifty metre arc, the other straight in front beyond fifty.

=== 2008 ===
2008 was Johns' final season with Essendon, during which he played in just 2 games. During the season he injured his anterior cruciate ligament (ACL) in a Victorian Football League (VFL), ending his season. He played 21 games, and Essendon won just 3 of those games. At the end of the 2008 season he was delisted.

== Post-AFL career ==
Johns returned to the East Fremantle Football Club in a full-forward role in 2009, and later played in country Victoria.

At the end of the 2009 season, Johns was involved in a dispute with East Fremantle when he did not come back after an off-season trip. Subsequently, Johns was released to Heywood in the Western Border Football League (based on the Victorian/South Australian border) alongside other former AFL footballers, such as Mal Michael. In round 2, against Hamilton Imperials, he kicked 11 goals, helping to end the club's 44-game losing streak. He finished the season as the leagues leading goal scorer with 78 goals.

In 2011, Courtney Johns signed with the Aberfeldie Football Club in the Essendon District Football League (EDFL), along with other former Bombers Hayden Skipworth and Damien Peverill but had to bow out due to injury before the season even began. Johns played in multiple grand finals with the team, losing in 2013 and 2014 before winning in 2017 and 2018, retiring after the 2018 season.
