= Josh Thurgood =

Australian rules footballer

Personal information
- Born: 5 June 1985 (age 41)
- Original team: Hamilton Imperials/North Ballarat U18
- Debut: Round 1, 27 March 2005, Hawthorn vs. Sydney Swans, at Sydney Cricket Ground
- Height: 190 cm (6 ft 3 in)
- Weight: 70 kg (154 lb)

Playing career^{1}
Years	Club	Games (Goals)
2005—2007	Hawthorn	13 (1)
- ^{1} Playing statistics correct to the end of 2007.

Josh Thurgood (born 5 June 1985) is a former Australian rules footballer in the Australian Football League.

Drafted onto the Hawthorn Football Club's Rookie List for the 2004 season, Thurgood suffered a serious knee injury in Round 2 of the VFL season playing for the Box Hill Hawks. In 2005, he was elevated from the Rookie List by the Hawks for the 2005 season and made his AFL debut in Round 1 of that year. Noted for his exceptional courage and attack on the ball, Thurgood mainly played in defence for the Hawks. His weaknesses were considered to be his slight frame, weighing just 70 kilograms. Thurgood was also a cult figure for his appearance, which consisted of a thin build and red dreadlocks. His nicknames around the club included "Red Baron", "Scarecrow", "Otzi" and "Sideshow Bob", which are all borne of his appearance and added to his cult status.

In his third game in the AFL, Round 3 of 2005 against Essendon, Thurgood suffered injuries after Matthew Lloyd, in his return from a forearm injury, made flush contact with Thurgood's face. This led to controversy since Lloyd was wearing a forearm guard that may have increased the impact of the collision. Lloyd was later cleared by the AFL Match Review Panel of any wrongdoing as the forearm guard was approved by the AFL prior to Lloyd wearing it.

Thurgood returned to the side two weeks later after undergoing surgery for a depressed fracture of the cheekbone, missing only one match from the injury. His stint in the side was brief, and he was dropped after Round 7 before returning for a one-off game in Round 13. He suffered a hamstring injury before Hawthorn's Round 15 clash. He returned to Box Hill and returned to the Hawthorn line up in Round 21, stringing together the last two games of the season.

In 2006, Thurgood had shoulder surgery during the pre-season. He recovered to return to the side in Round 10, but played just two games for the season (the other one being in Round 11). He struggled for form and was delisted at the end of the year. However, he was redrafted by Hawthorn in the 2007 Pre-season draft. He played two more games in 2007, but was delisted again at the end of the year. He never played in a win for Hawthorn after finishing his career with 0 wins and 13 losses.

After being delisted by Hawthorn, Thurgood signed for the Port Adelaide Magpies in the South Australian National Football League (SANFL) for the 2008 season.

Thurgood's great-great uncle is former Essendon champion Albert Thurgood.
