= Ben Davies (Australian footballer) =

Australian rules footballer, born 1986

Personal information
- Born: 10 February 1986 (age 40)
- Original team: Western Jets (TAC Cup)
- Debut: Round 7, 8 May 2005, Collingwood vs. Fremantle, at Subiaco Oval

Playing career^{1}
Years	Club	Games (Goals)
2005–2007	Collingwood	12 (1)
2008	North Melbourne	2 (0)
Total		14 (1)
- ^{1} Playing statistics correct to the end of 2008.

Career highlights
- Joseph Wren Memorial Trophy 2007

Benjamin Davies (born 10 February 1986) is an Australian rules footballer.

From Williamstown, Davies played in the TAC Cup for the Western Jets. His courageous ability as an in-and-under player got his name on the list, and was drafted as a rookie by Collingwood in late 2004. His skills were ordinary, but Davies earned an unexpected promotion early on in the season for injured skipper Nathan Buckley who would be put on the long-term injury list. He made his Australian Football League (AFL) debut soon after in Round 7 against Fremantle at Subiaco Oval and showed he was a ball winner, having 14 touches in the first half.

His debut season was good enough for him to be elevated on the senior list from the rookie list for season 2006, where he played mostly in the Victorian Football League (VFL), managing only five senior appearances. During 2007 he won the Best and Fairest at the Williamstown Football Club but did not convince the Magpies he should be retained for the 2008 season. On 12 October 2007, Ben was traded to the Kangaroos in exchange for their round six selection (selection 96 overall). He made his debut for North Melbourne in Round 11 of the 2008 season, against Geelong.

Davies was delisted at the end of the 2008 season, and then played for Williamstown in the VFL. Davies played for Williamstown when on Collingwood's list from 2005-07 and then played again from 2009-11 before transferring to Wangaratta for two seasons. He returned to Williamstown for one final season in 2014. In total, Davies played 126 games for the VFL Seagulls and kicked 54 goals, including the 2011 grand final against Port Melbourne at Docklands Stadium. Apart from the Club best and fairest in 2007, Davies finished equal third in the count in 2010 and represented the VFL the same year. He also made the VFL Team-of-the-Year in 2010/11. Davies received life membership of the WFC in 2012.
