= David Fanning (footballer) =

Australian rules footballer, born 1984

Personal information
- Born: 20 July 1984 (age 42)
- Original team: Aberfeldie
- Debut: Round 1, 28 March 2005, Collingwood vs. Western Bulldogs, at Melbourne Cricket Ground
- Height: 204 cm (6 ft 8 in)
- Weight: 97 kg (214 lb)

Playing career^{1}
Years	Club	Games (Goals)
2005–2006	Collingwood	14 (4)
- ^{1} Playing statistics correct to the end of 2006.

David Fanning (born 20 July 1984) is an Australian rules footballer and former basketball player. He is currently with the Newtown eagles and teaches at Belmont High School.

Former NBL basketballer with the Cairns Taipans, Fanning was placed onto the Collingwood rookie list in 2004 as a project player. At 204 cm in height, he was a fast moving ruckman who spent most of the season on the sidelines, needing a knee reconstruction, but was retained on the rookie list for 2005, and with injuries to Guy Richards he was immediately promoted and played Round 1. He was omitted the next week but returned later on in the season and showed improvement each match he played kicking 12 goals in round 4. Among many highlights David had in the season of 2005, the one that stands out was when he accidentally kicked the ball backwards whilst attempting a forward kick and miraculously hitting the target. David progressed as if he had purposely kicked this ball in a backwards direction. He adapted to the game, ending up playing 13 games in his debut season and was then elevated to the senior list for 2006.

In 2006 he improved his ability skill wise, however he could not perform at the top level when required, playing only one senior game for the year. He was delisted at the end of the season with other talls.

After leaving the football club he became a teacher and worked at Coburg High for several years before moving on to Belmont High.
