= List of VFL/AFL players to have scored a goal with their first kick =

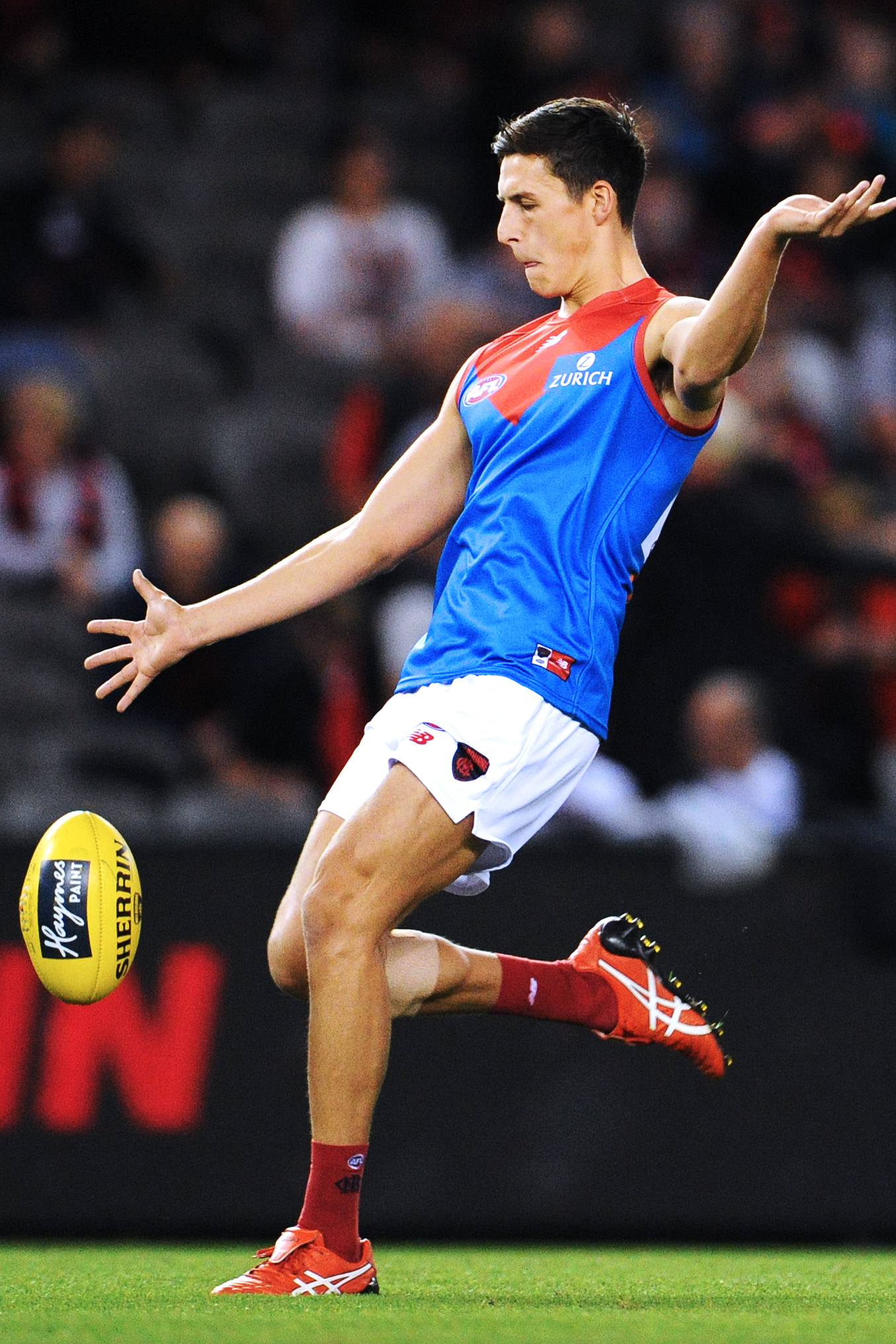
Sam Weideman is one of just 40 AFL players to score two goals with his first two kicks.

In Australian rules football, a player can score a goal by kicking the oval ball between the two central goal posts. 333 players are recognised to have scored a goal with their first kick in the sport's premier competition, the Australian Football League (AFL), known before 1990 as the Victorian Football League (VFL). These players are often said to have joined an "elite" and "exclusive" club.

Rarer still are players who have scored goals from their first two kicks – a mere 43 of these players have been recorded. Of these players, just 11 have also scored a goal with their third kick. Clen Denning (debuted 1935), Richard Lounder (1989) and Daniel Metropolis (1992) are the only VFL/AFL players documented to have scored four goals from as many kicks. Denning followed up with goals from his fifth and sixth kicks, an effort that remains unmatched.

On occasion, players have mistakenly been omitted from – and included in – the AFL's official records of the accomplishment. For example, Melbourne's Dave McGlashan scored a goal with his first kick during the 1981 VFL season. However, his achievement was not recognised until 2010, when he was prompted to come forward after the club's website published an article examining Melbourne players who accomplished the feat. In a contrasting event in 2002, Essendon's Shane Harvey was briefly recognised to have scored goals with his first two kicks, before an Essendon fan pointed out Harvey had in fact kicked a clearing ball just a few seconds into his debut, prior to his first goal.

These record-keeping errors also serve to explain why the list is so heavily weighted towards the modern era, with more than half (165) of the instances listed occurring since 1999, the same year Champion Data began keeping detailed statistics for the league. Basic statistics had been recorded since 1965, but instances that occurred throughout this period and prior were still generally only recorded in newspaper reports.

== Goal with first kick ==
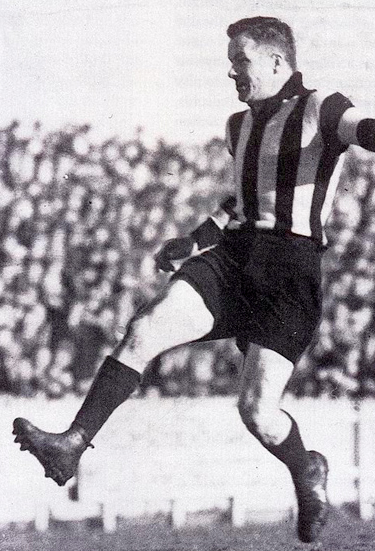
Collingwood's Gordon Coventry.

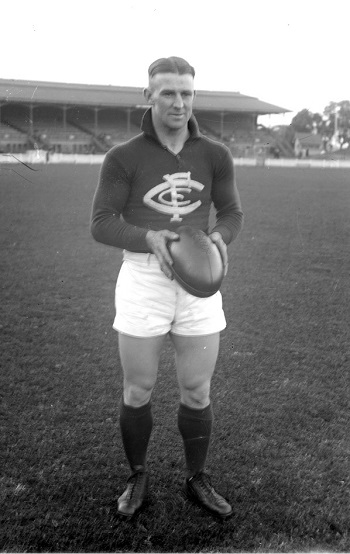
Carlton's Mickey Crisp.

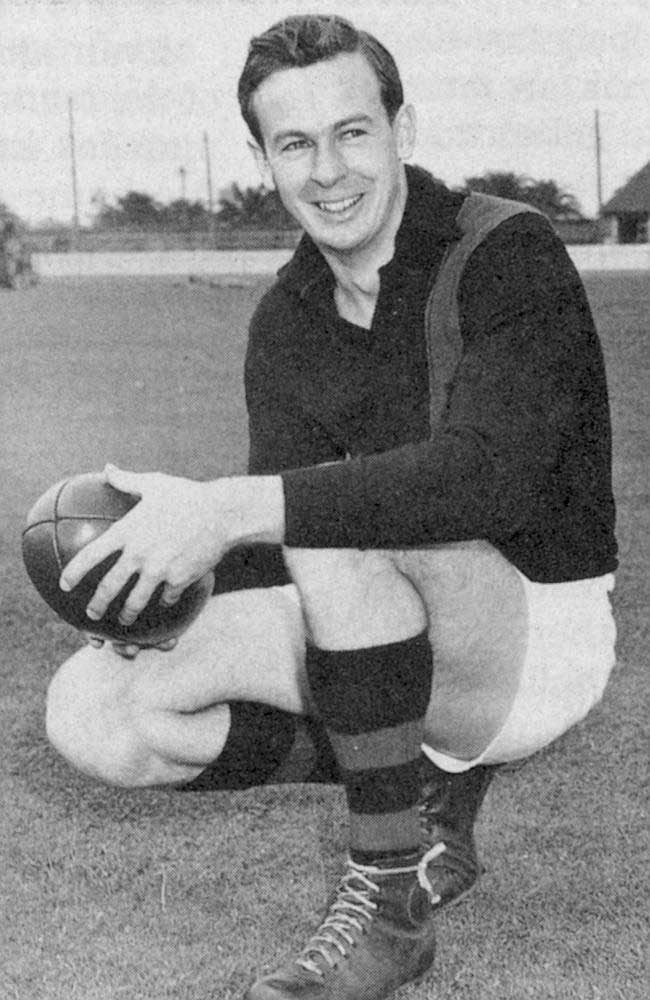
Essendon's John Coleman.

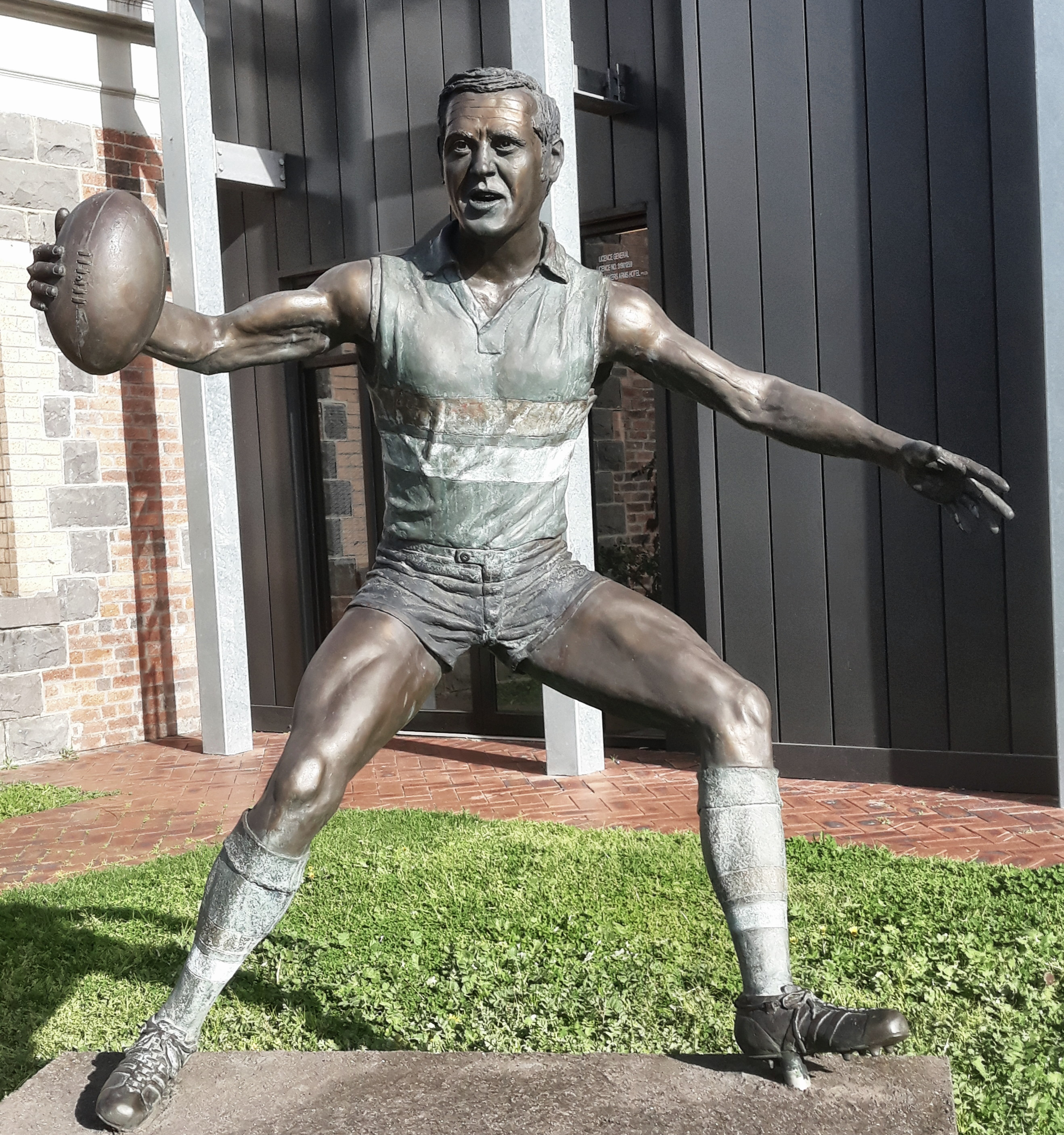
Footscray's Ted Whitten.

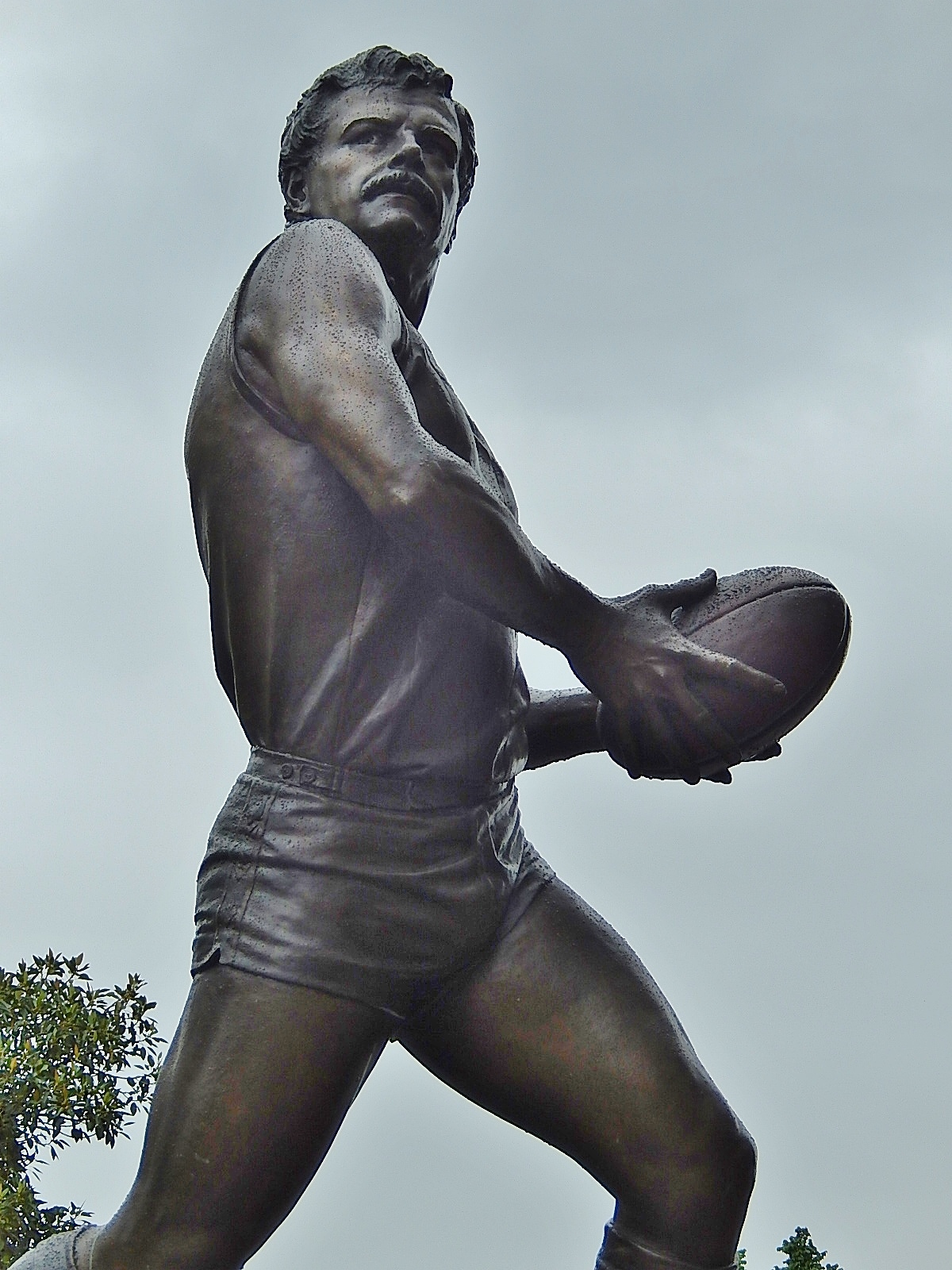
Hawthorn's Leigh Matthews.

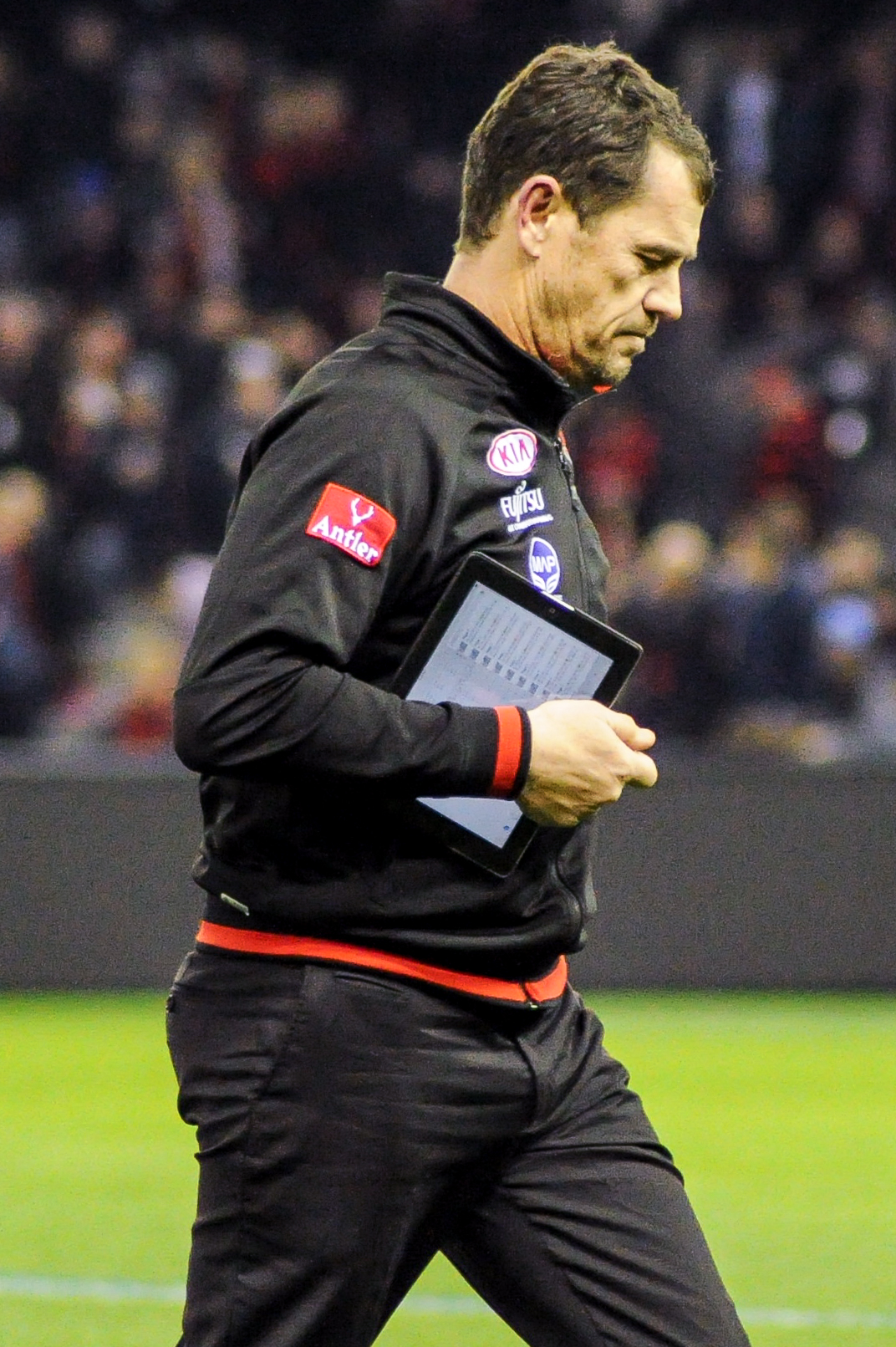
Essendon's Mark Harvey.

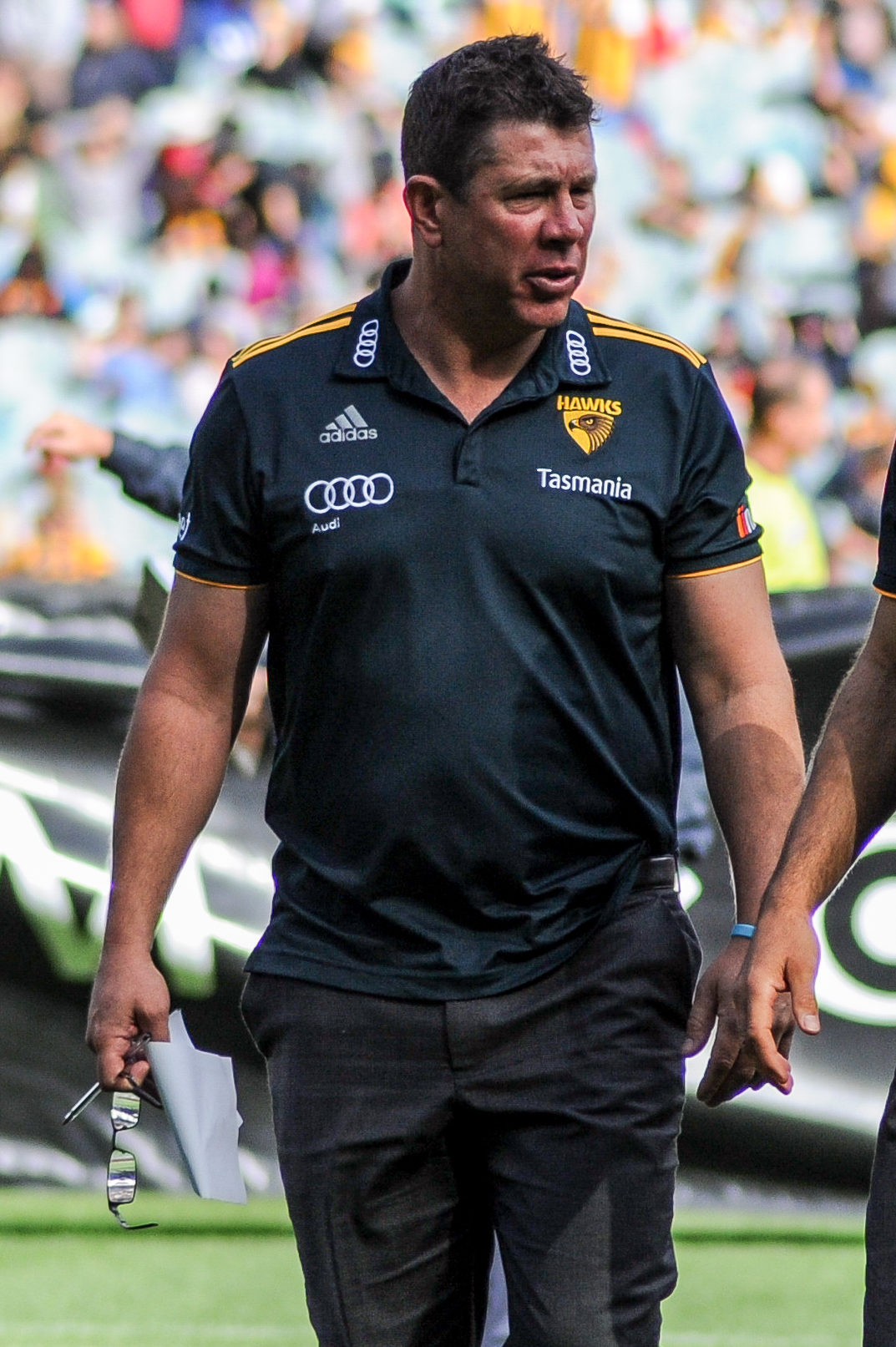
Brett Ratten (pictured with Hawthorn) of Carlton.

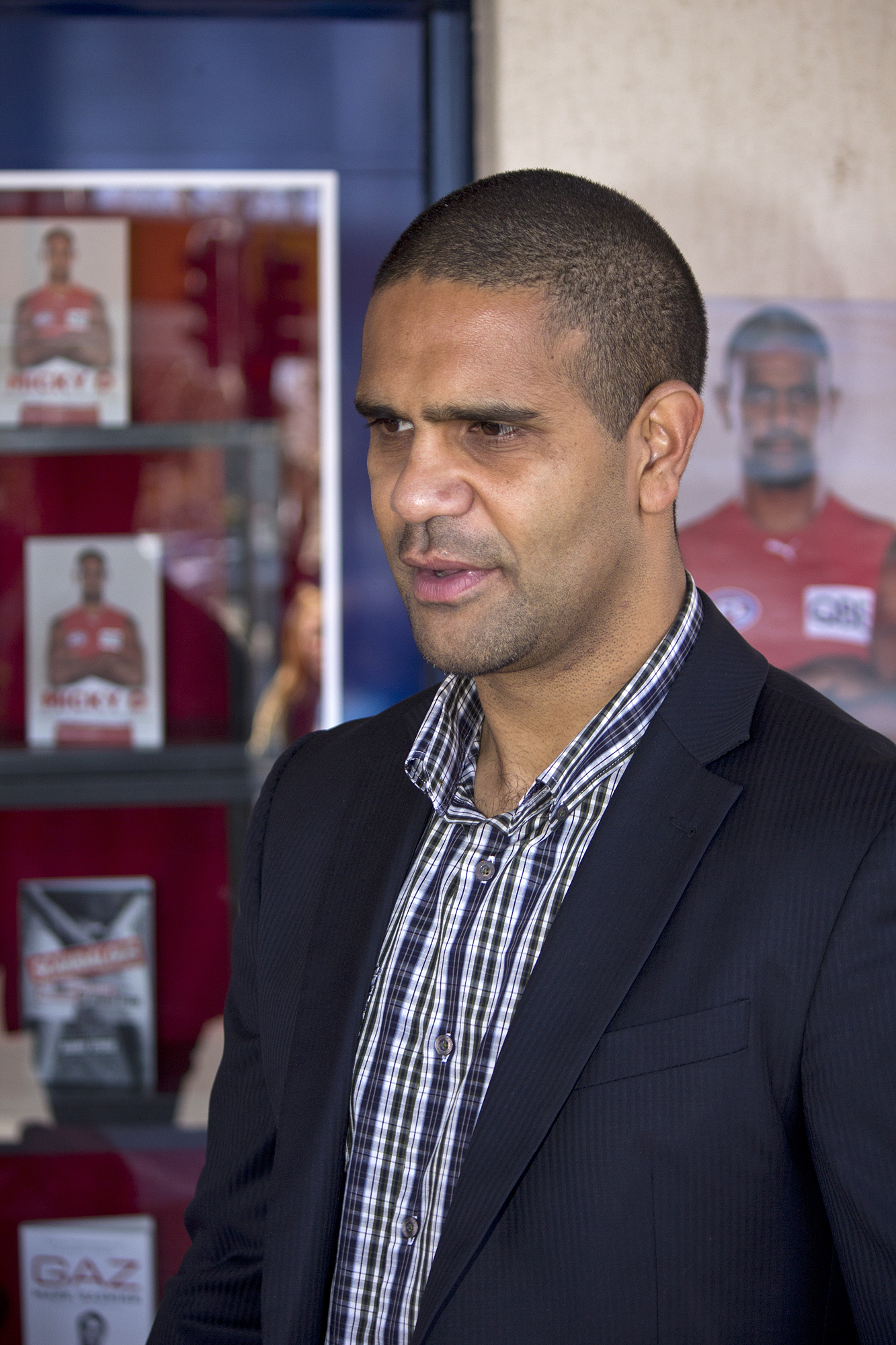
Sydney's Michael O'Loughlin.

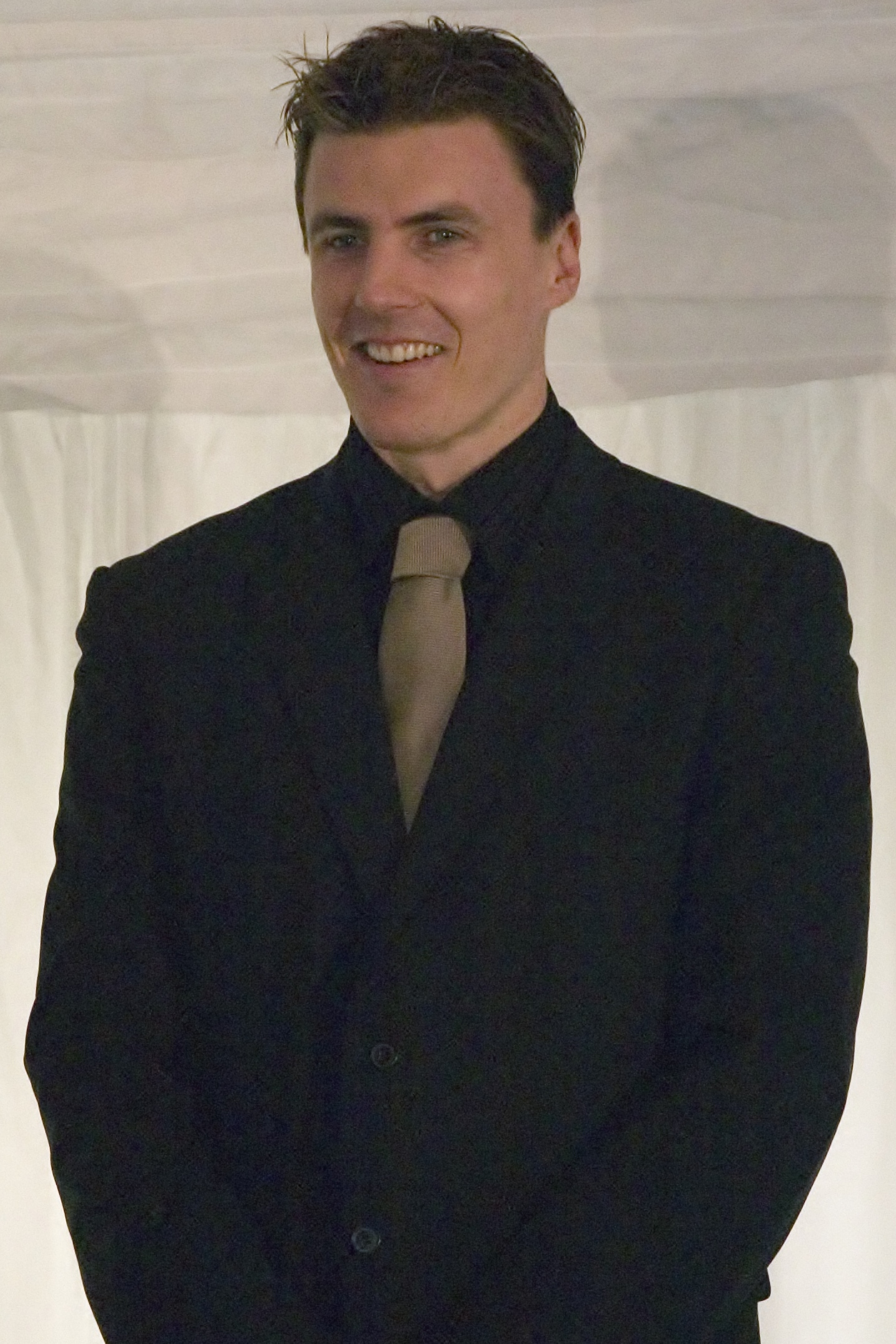
Essendon's Matthew Lloyd.

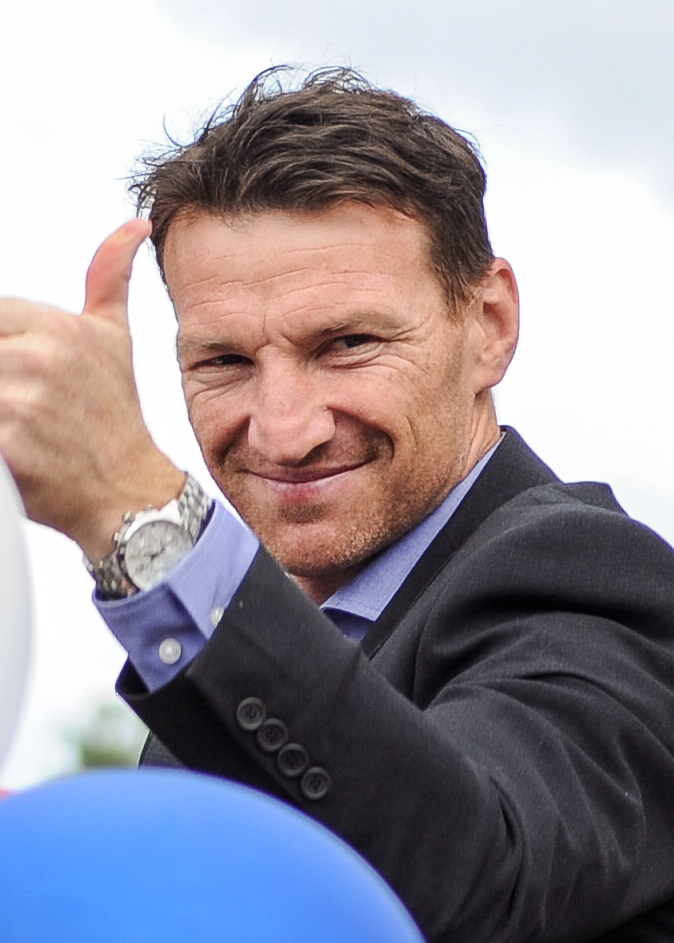
North Melbourne's Brent Harvey.

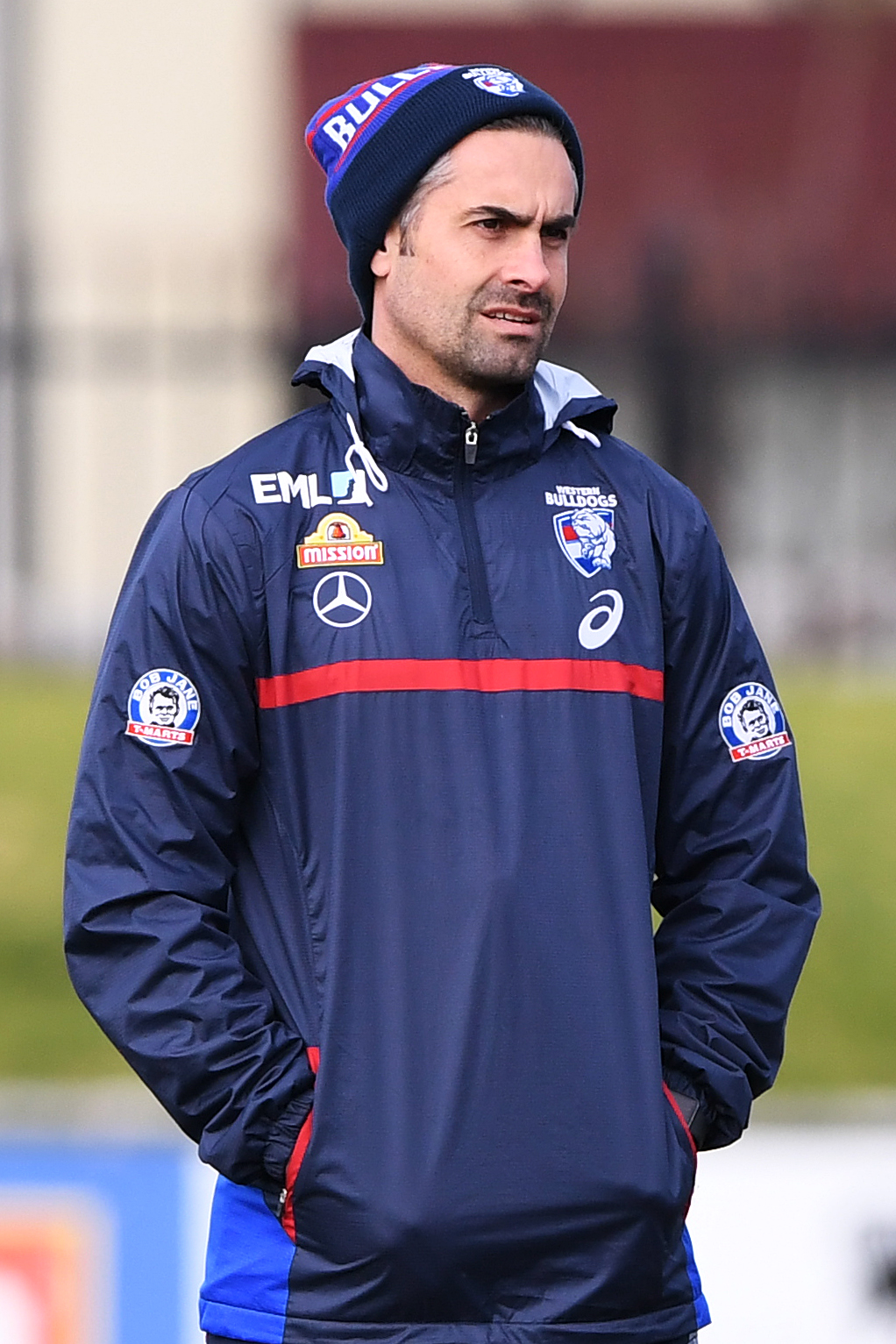
Daniel Giansiracusa of the Western Bulldogs.

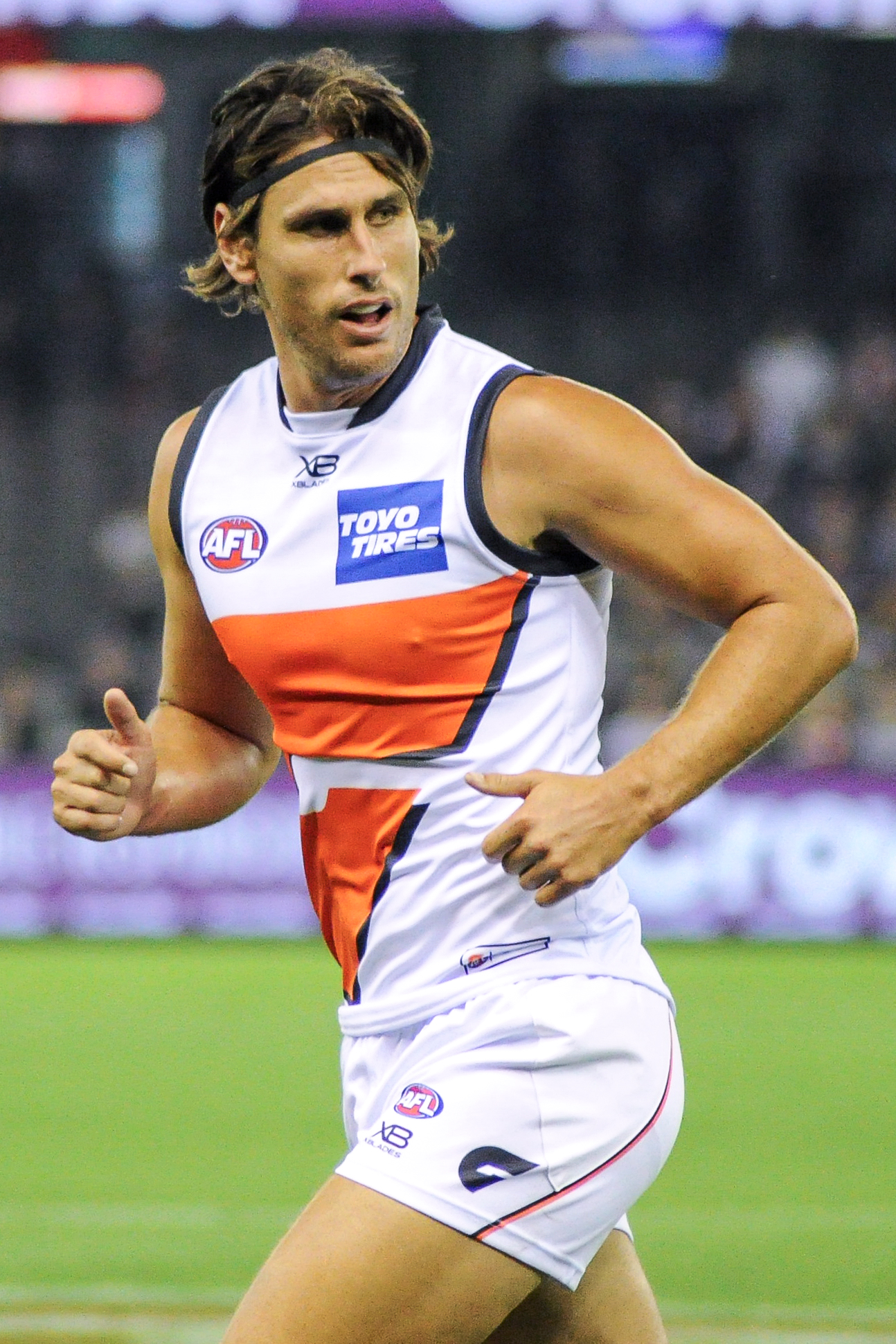
Ryan Griffen (pictured with GWS) of the Western Bulldogs.

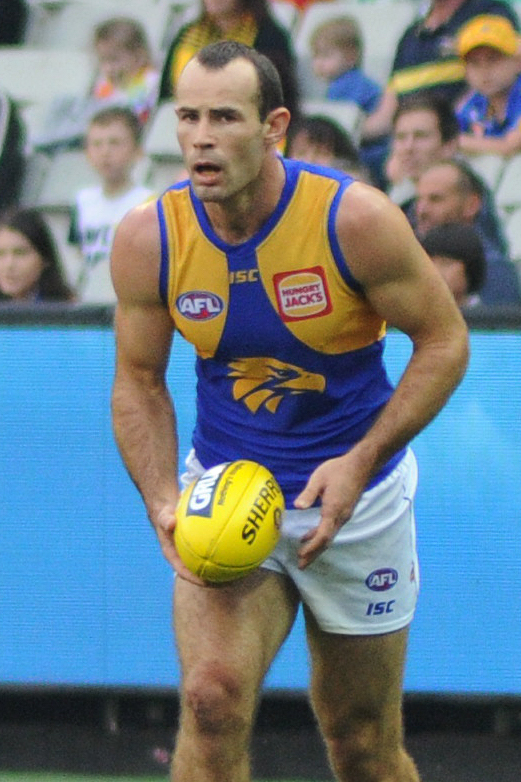
West Coast's Shannon Hurn.

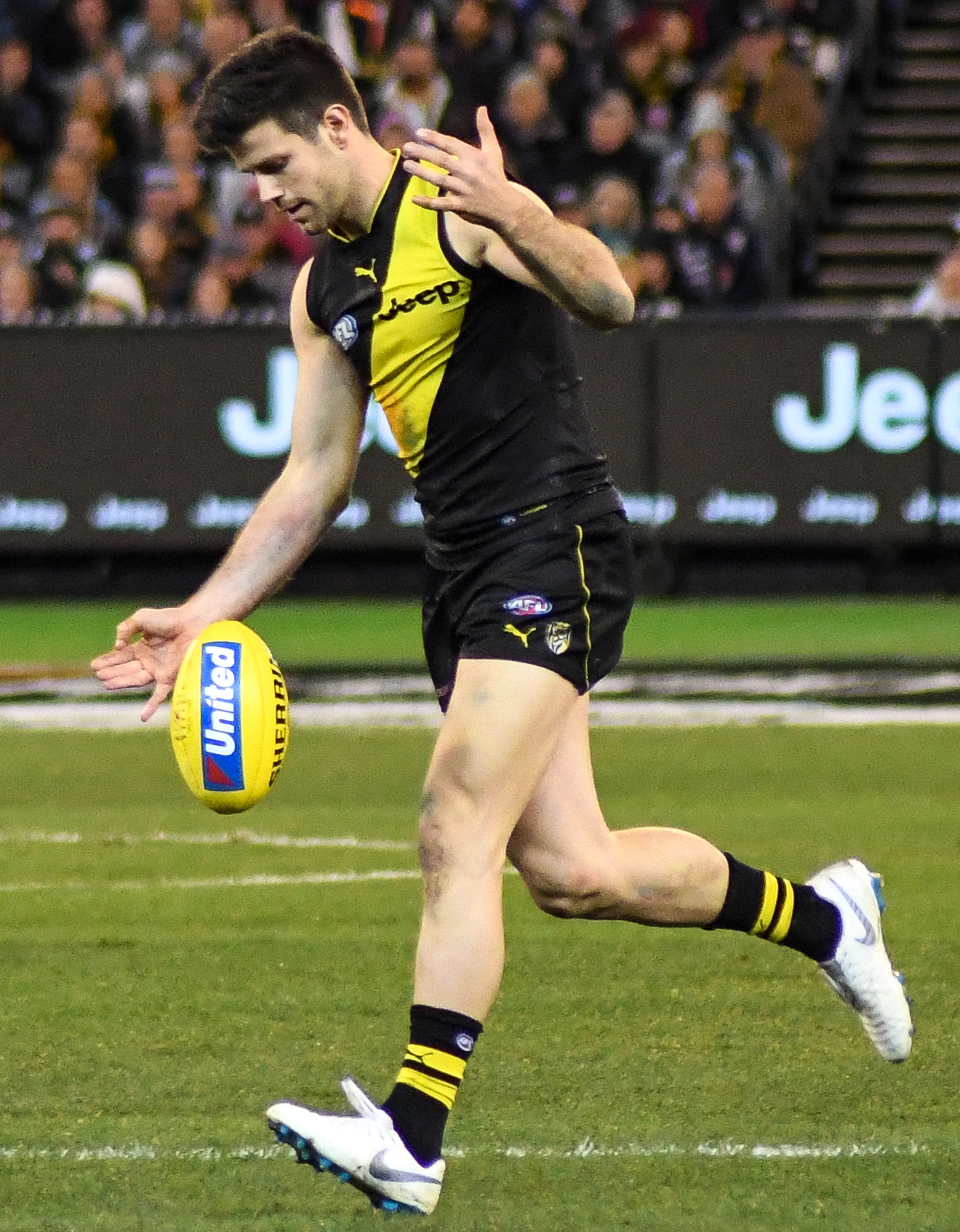
Richmond's Trent Cotchin.

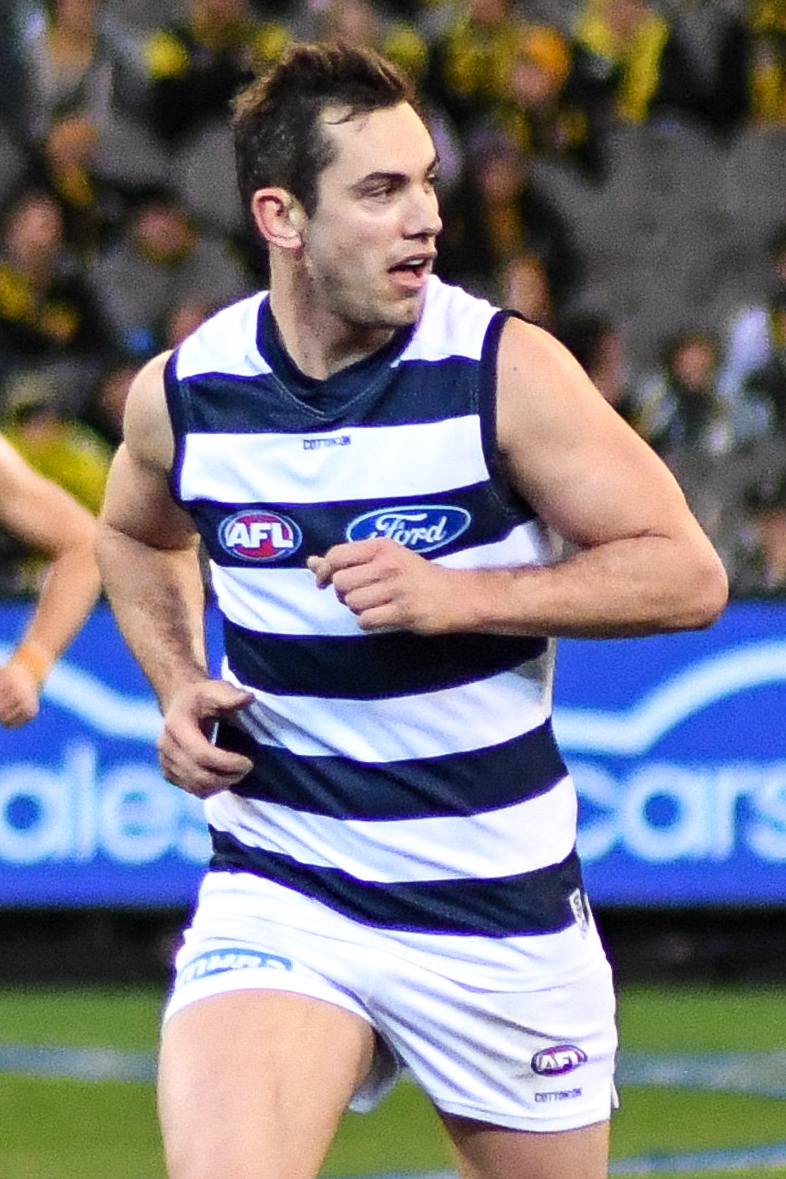
Geelong's Daniel Menzel.

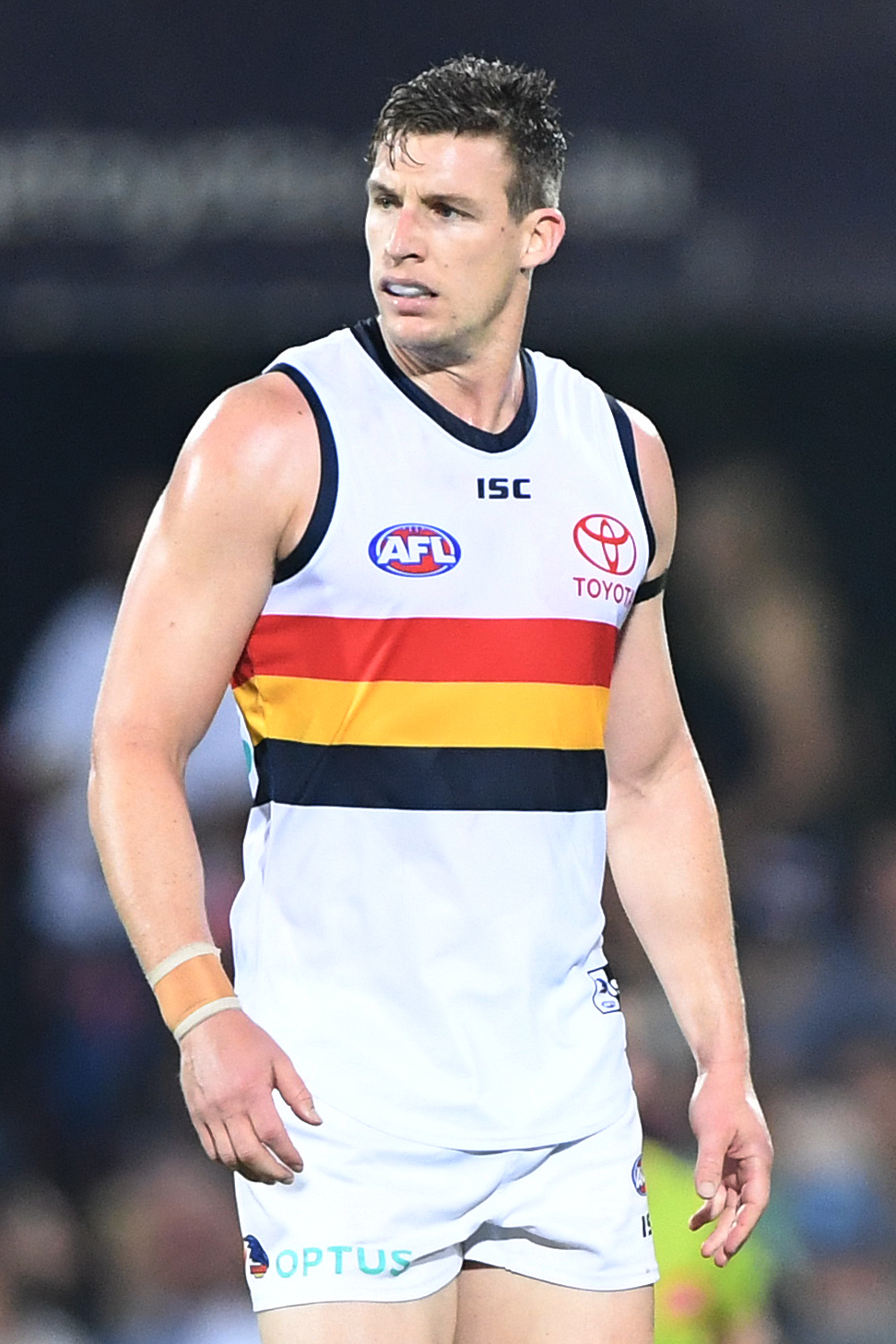
Adelaide's Josh Jenkins.

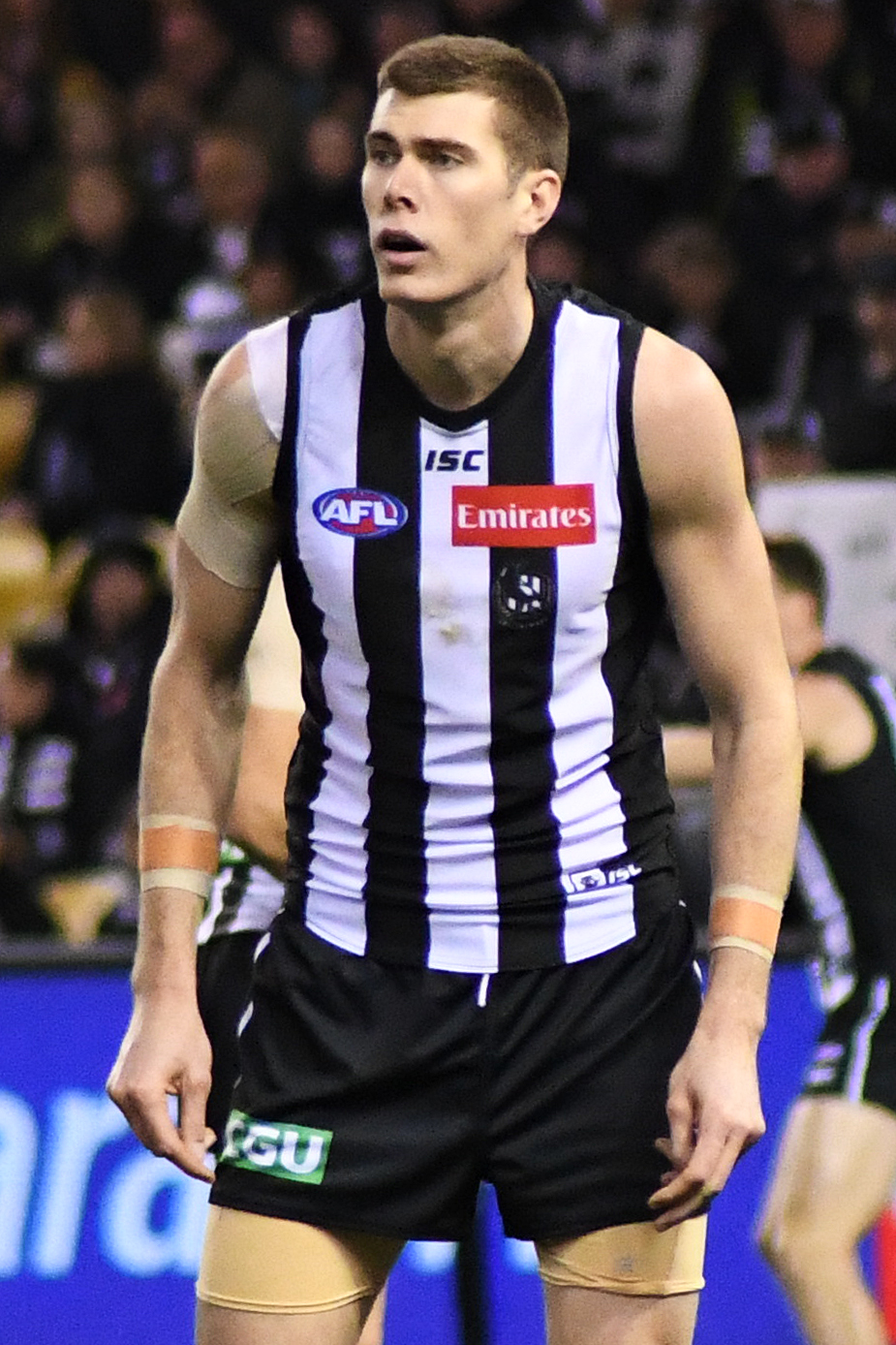
Collingwood's Mason Cox.

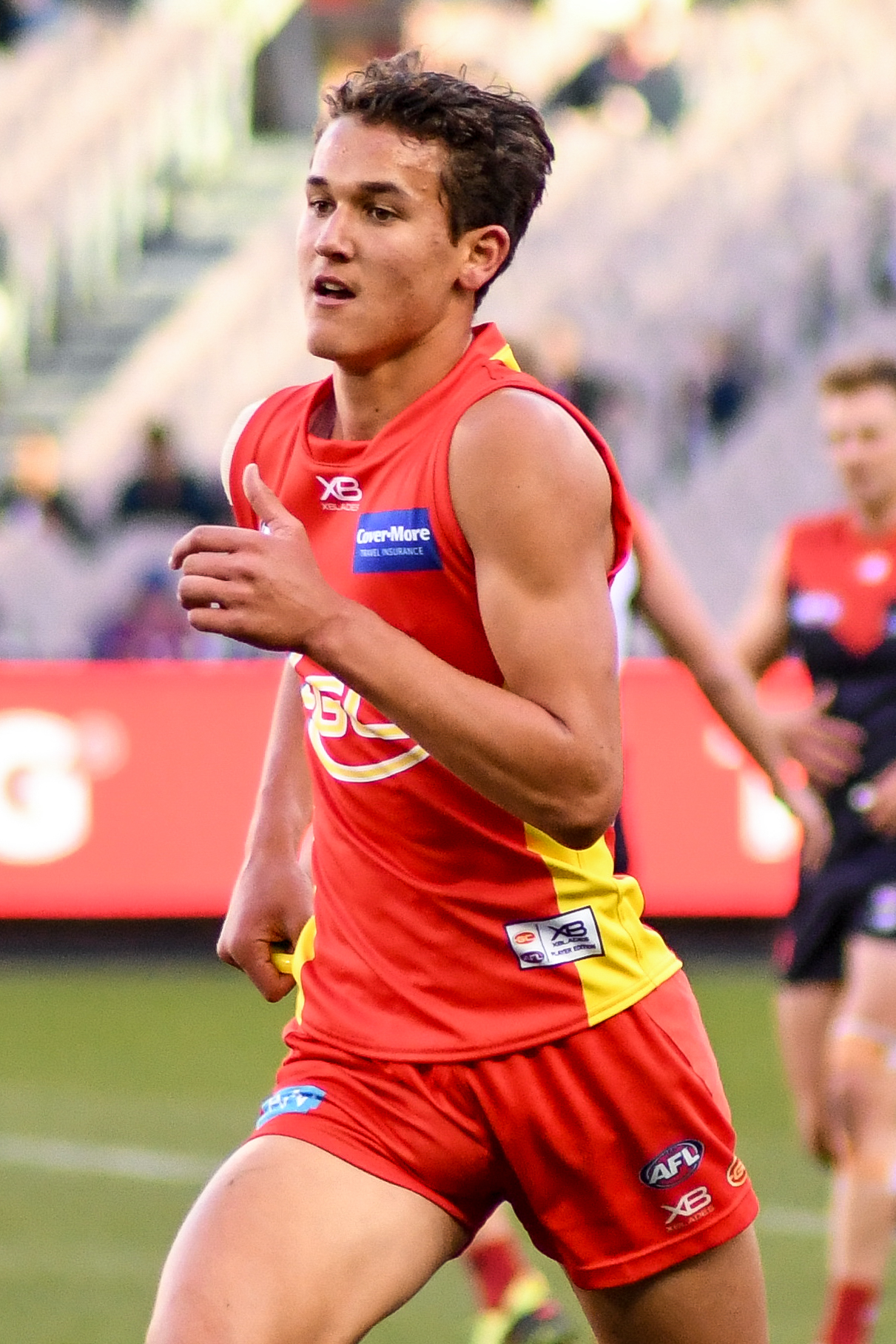
Gold Coast's Wil Powell.

Legend
Rd.	The round in which the player scored his first goal
(n)	Player scored goals with his first n kicks.
*	Player has not scored another goal in his career.
†	Player has not recorded another kick in his career.
#	Player did not record a kick in his first match.
##	Player did not record a kick in his first two matches.

Players to have scored a goal with their first kick (Note: All entries up to the end of 2023 are sourced to the AFL Record Season Guide 2024, except where noted. Players' Hall of Fame membership and Legend status are sourced to AFL.com.au.)
Player	Club	Rd.	Year
Jack Kirby	Essendon	11	1911
Gordon Coventry	Collingwood	15	1920
Ray Brew	Carlton	3	1923
Col Deane	Melbourne	4	1925
Mickey Crisp	Carlton	1	1931
Clen Denning (6)	Carlton	4	1935
Jack McMillan	Footscray	7	1936
Brendon O'Donnell	St Kilda	4	1939
Kevin O'Halloran	St Kilda	9	1939
Ian Chinn (2)	South Melbourne	6	1940
Alby Oatway *	St Kilda	11	1941
Alec Mathieson *	Geelong	5	1944
Jeff Brisbane	Geelong	12	1944
Clive Yewers	Footscray	11	1947
Bob Reid	Footscray	1	1948
Jack Marr	Hawthorn	7	1948
John Coleman	Essendon	1	1949
Arthur Pound	Melbourne	8	1950
Bob Trainer (2)	South Melbourne	13	1950
Len Kent	Footscray	1	1951
Bill Smeaton	Melbourne	1	1951
Ted Whitten	Footscray	1	1951
Fred Anderson	Fitzroy	10	1951
Harry Herbert	Geelong	13	1952
Tom Hafey	Richmond	6	1953
Keith Bromage	Collingwood	17	1953
Owen Abrahams	Fitzroy	7	1954
Glen Bow	Geelong	11	1954
Bob Crowe	Carlton	17	1954
Robert Fox	Essendon	1	1955
Stuart Lennie (2)	St Kilda	1	1955
Alan Anton	Fitzroy	2	1955
Bob Pratt Jr.	South Melbourne	4	1955
Ray Allsopp	Richmond	7	1955
Max Oaten	South Melbourne	9	1956
Bernie Jeffrey	South Melbourne	13	1956
Ken Timms	Essendon	1	1957
Keith Burns	Collingwood	9	1957
Ted Fordham	Essendon	1	1961
Doug Wade	Geelong	1	1961
Edo Benetti (2)	Richmond	8	1961
Bill Ryan	Geelong	9	1963
Frank Davis	Melbourne	13	1964
Ian Randle †	South Melbourne	16	1964
Vin Crowe	Richmond	17	1964
Gareth Andrews	Geelong	1	1965
Don Gross	Essendon	1	1965
Denis Hughson †	Fitzroy	7	1965
Vin Waite (2)	Carlton	5	1966
Graham Croft	St Kilda	14	1966
Gary Farrant	North Melbourne	1	1967
Robert Walls	Carlton	2	1967
Jeff McGee	South Melbourne	7	1967
Gerald O'Loughlin †	Geelong	16	1968
Barry Round	Footscray	1	1969
Peter Weightman *	Fitzroy	10	1969
Leigh Matthews	Hawthorn	16	1969
Ray Carr	Melbourne	1	1970
David Clarke	Geelong	1	1971
Michael Tuck (3)	Hawthorn	8	1972
Ian George	St Kilda	8	1973
Tony Dullard	Melbourne	19	1973
Billy Picken (2)	Collingwood	5	1974
David Armour (2)	Geelong	8	1974
Michael Cooke	Hawthorn	SF	1975
David Miller	Richmond	4	1977
Laurie Serafini	Fitzroy	15	1977
Dale Weightman	Richmond	1	1978
Malcolm Reed	Geelong	2	1978
Chris Stone	St Kilda	10	1978
Leigh Carlson	Collingwood	16	1978
Des O'Dwyer	Melbourne	17	1978
Rino Pretto †	Fitzroy	19	1978
John Mossop	Geelong	1	1979
Matthew Wall	Richmond	1	1980
Dave McGlashan	Melbourne	4	1981
Spiro Kourkoumelis	Carlton	17	1981
Wally Lovett	Collingwood	2	1982
Peter Tossol (2)	Melbourne	6	1982
Rod Owen	St Kilda	1	1983
Daryl Gilmore	Carlton	4	1983
Tony Lockett	St Kilda	4	1983
Ian Fairley (3)	North Melbourne	7	1983
Mark Harvey	Essendon	4	1984
Jason Dunstall	Hawthorn	2	1985
Scott Morphett *	Geelong	22	1985
Stephen Kernahan	Carlton	1	1986
David Cameron	Geelong	5	1986
Barry Stoneham	Geelong	6	1986
Stewart Loewe	St Kilda	9	1986
Dean Bailey	Essendon	13	1986
Brendan Littler *	St Kilda	20	1986
Simon Atkins (2)	Footscray	2	1987
Garry Hocking	Geelong	3	1987
John Barnes (2)	Essendon	6	1987
Gary Cameron	Geelong	11	1987
Mark Hepburn	North Melbourne	18	1987
Jamie Shaw	Fitzroy	18	1987
Sean Denham	Geelong	21	1987
John Brinkkotter *	Sydney	1	1988
Darren Davies	Footscray	2	1988
Andy Lovell	Melbourne	3	1988
Justin Stubbs (2)	Essendon	12	1988
Stephen Tingay	Melbourne	1	1989
Richard Lounder (4)	Richmond	5	1989
Chris O'Sullivan	Brisbane Bears	9	1989
David Welsby *	Geelong	2	1990
Tim Rieniets	Carlton	6	1990
Brent Heaver	Melbourne	11	1990
Dale Lewis	Sydney	15	1990
Brett Ratten	Carlton	22	1990
Nathan Bower	Richmond	24	1991
Andrew Lamprill	Melbourne	2	1992
Randall Bone (2)	Adelaide	3	1992
Daniel Metropolis (4)	West Coast	3	1992
Michael Dunstan (2)	Fitzroy	1	1993
Peter Everitt	St Kilda	1	1993
Ilija Grgic (2)	Footscray	2	1993
Ricky Olarenshaw	Essendon	3	1993
Paul Hopgood	Melbourne	4	1993
Tim Hargreaves (3)	Hawthorn	5	1994
Warren Campbell	North Melbourne	7	1994
Damian Houlihan (3)	Collingwood	7	1994
Daniel Hargraves	Footscray	10	1994
Scott Cummings (2)	Essendon	14	1994
Lachlan Ross *	Essendon	14	1994
Matthew Allan	Carlton	15	1994
Peter Bell (2)	Fremantle	1	1995
Shannon Grant	Sydney	1	1995
Chad Liddell	Collingwood	1	1995
Leigh Wardell-Johnson	Fremantle	2	1995
Jeff White	Fremantle	3	1995
Jason Heatley	West Coast	4	1995
Michael O'Loughlin	Sydney	5	1995
Jeff Farmer	Melbourne	6	1995
Jeff Bruce (2)	Fitzroy	9	1995
Simon Beaumont	Carlton	10	1995
Mark Stevens (2)	North Melbourne	10	1995
Matthew Lloyd	Essendon	14	1995
Ben Moore (2)	Richmond	11	1996
Peter Vardy	Adelaide	14	1996
Blake Caracella	Essendon	3	1997
Leigh Newton	Melbourne	3	1997
Brent Harvey	North Melbourne	5	1997
Jacob Anstey	Carlton	7	1997
Jarrod Cotton	Port Adelaide	10	1997
Paul Dooley	Western Bulldogs	1	1998
Andrew Pugsley (2)	Collingwood	4	1998
Brett O'Farrell	Sydney	13	1998
Leigh Brockman *	Geelong	14	1998
Tom Harley	Port Adelaide	14	1998
Michael Gardiner *	Collingwood	21	1998
Lucas Herbert *	Adelaide	1	1999
Des Headland	Brisbane Lions	13	1999
Damien Adkins	Collingwood	1	2000
Cameron Bruce	Melbourne	1	2000
Ryan Fitzgerald (2)	Sydney	1	2000
Luke McPharlin	Hawthorn	5	2000
Matthew Pavlich (2)	Fremantle	5	2000
Aaron Fiora	Richmond	7	2000
John Spaull	North Melbourne	13	2000
Daniel Schell	Fremantle	15	2000
Marcus Baldwin (3)	Geelong	21	2000
Alan Didak	Collingwood	7	2001
Troy Broadbridge	Melbourne	8	2001
Dean Brogan	Port Adelaide	9	2001
Daniel Giansiracusa	Western Bulldogs	11	2001
Tim Hazell	Hawthorn	14	2001
Leigh Harding	North Melbourne	17	2001
Michael Osborne	Hawthorn	21	2001
Paul Medhurst	Fremantle	1	2002
Mark Williams #	Hawthorn	3	2002
Quinten Lynch	West Coast	12	2002
Ashley Sampi	West Coast	14	2002
Sam Hunt *	Essendon	20	2002
Jonathon McCormick	Carlton	1	2003
Steven Salopek	Port Adelaide	1	2003
Allan Murray #	St Kilda	10	2003
Laurence Angwin	Carlton	14	2003
Ben Rutten (3)	Adelaide	16	2003
Brent Staker (2)	West Coast	17	2003
Kane Tenace	Geelong	2	2004
Nathan Bock (2)	Adelaide	5	2004
Cameron Faulkner	Western Bulldogs	6	2004
Brock McLean	Melbourne	11	2004
Colin Sylvia #	Melbourne	21	2004
Jaymie Graham (2)	West Coast	3	2005
Ryan Griffen	Western Bulldogs	4	2005
Setanta Ó hAilpín	Carlton	7	2005
Tim Walsh *	Western Bulldogs	8	2005
Nick Malceski	Sydney	11	2005
Henry Slattery	Essendon	13	2005
Nathan Ablett	Geelong	20	2005
Mitch Clark	Brisbane Lions	1	2006
Matthew Bate	Melbourne	5	2006
Shannon Hurn	West Coast	5	2006
Fabian Deluca ## *	Port Adelaide	8	2006
Joel Patfull	Brisbane Lions	8	2006
Scott Pendlebury	Collingwood	10	2006
Michael Rix	St Kilda	11	2006
Matt Thomas	Port Adelaide	14	2006
Greg Bentley	Port Adelaide	19	2006
Bryce Gibbs	Carlton	1	2007
Travis Varcoe	Geelong	2	2007
Bachar Houli	Essendon	7	2007
Justin Westhoff	Port Adelaide	10	2007
Jay Neagle	Essendon	22	2007
Jack Anthony (2)	Collingwood	3	2008
Matthew Kreuzer	Carlton	3	2008
Clayton Hinkley	Fremantle	5	2008
Trent Cotchin	Richmond	8	2008
Ryan Davis	West Coast	8	2008
Chris Dawes	Collingwood	19	2008
Patrick Dangerfield	Adelaide	20	2008
Jeff Garlett	Carlton	1	2009
Stephen Hill	Fremantle	1	2009
Taylor Walker	Adelaide	1	2009
Brent Macaffer	Collingwood	5	2009
Matt de Boer	Fremantle	6	2009
Brodie Martin	Adelaide	16	2009
Callum Wilson	West Coast	18	2009
Cameron Hitchcock	Port Adelaide	1	2010
Luke Shuey	West Coast	1	2010
Jordan Roughead	Western Bulldogs	5	2010
Andrew Strijk	West Coast	13	2010
Kyle Hardingham	Essendon	17	2010
Ben Speight	North Melbourne	17	2010
Jake Carlisle	Essendon	20	2010
Daniel Menzel	Geelong	20	2010
Marcus Marigliani	Essendon	21	2010
Claye Beams	Brisbane Lions	1	2011
Charlie Dixon (2)	Gold Coast	2	2011
Jamie Cripps (2)	St Kilda	6	2011
Joseph Daye *	Gold Coast	7	2011
Alex Fasolo	Collingwood	12	2011
Patrick Karnezis (2)	Brisbane Lions	13	2011
Mitch Brown	Geelong	14	2011
Scott Lycett	West Coast	19	2011
Jason Tutt (3)	Western Bulldogs	22	2011
Casey Sibosado *	Fremantle	24	2011
James Magner (2)	Melbourne	1	2012
George Horlin-Smith	Geelong	3	2012
Josh Bruce	Greater Western Sydney	5	2012
Ahmed Saad	St Kilda	6	2012
Josh Jenkins	Adelaide	7	2012
Tim McIntyre	Adelaide	15	2012
Rhys Cooyou *	Greater Western Sydney	22	2012
Nick O'Brien	Essendon	22	2012
Luke Mitchell *	Carlton	23	2012
Dylan Buckley	Carlton	3	2013
Majak Daw	North Melbourne	4	2013
Sam Grimley	Hawthorn	9	2013
Kristian Jaksch	Greater Western Sydney	22	2013
Tim O'Brien	Hawthorn	1	2014
Sam Lloyd	Richmond	4	2014
Ben Lennon	Richmond	9	2014
Rory Lobb	Greater Western Sydney	12	2014
Luke Lowden	Hawthorn	12	2014
Shane Kersten	Geelong	14	2014
Mitch Honeychurch	Western Bulldogs	15	2014
Max Duffy	Fremantle	20	2014
Cam McCarthy	Greater Western Sydney	23	2014
Josh Glenn *	Gold Coast	5	2015
Billy Stretch	Melbourne	6	2015
Bailey Dale	Western Bulldogs	7	2015
Liam Dawson	Brisbane Lions	8	2015
Keegan Brooksby	Gold Coast	9	2015
Conor McKenna	Essendon	22	2015
Jade Gresham	St Kilda	1	2016
Jayden Short	Richmond	2	2016
Mason Cox	Collingwood	5	2016
Lewis Pierce *	St Kilda	12	2016
Sam Weideman (2)	Melbourne	20	2016
Ryan Burton	Hawthorn	21	2016
Sam Powell-Pepper	Port Adelaide	1	2017
Aidyn Johnson	Port Adelaide	5	2017
Ryan Nyhuis	Fremantle	16	2017
Josh Williams *	North Melbourne	18	2017
Josh Begley	Essendon	22	2017
Tom Doedee	Adelaide	1	2018
Darcy Fogarty	Adelaide	1	2018
Lachie Fogarty	Geelong	1	2018
Esava Ratugolea	Geelong	1	2018
Jack Higgins	Richmond	3	2018
Jacob Heron	Gold Coast	9	2018
Jamaine Jones	Geelong	10	2018
Wil Powell	Gold Coast	15	2018
Ryan Abbott	Geelong	20	2018
Noah Balta	Richmond	1	2019
Tom Sparrow	Melbourne	1	2019
Chayce Jones	Adelaide	1	2019
Chris Burgess	Gold Coast	11	2019
Nick Hind	St Kilda	13	2019
Ben Cavarra	Western Bulldogs	1	2020
Max King	St Kilda	1	2020
Will Kelly *	Collingwood	6	2020
Izak Rankine	Gold Coast	6	2020
Cody Weightman	Western Bulldogs	7	2020
Brad Close	Geelong	8	2020
Irving Mosquito	Essendon	13	2020
Jy Farrar	Gold Coast	18	2020
Tom Powell	North Melbourne	1	2021
Francis Evans	Geelong	2	2021
Beau McCreery	Collingwood	4	2021
Isiah Winder	West Coast	4	2021
Cooper Sharman	St Kilda	20	2021
Callum Brown	Greater Western Sydney	21	2021
Josh Rachele	Adelaide	1	2022
Nathan O'Driscoll	Fremantle	2	2022
Jack Carroll	Carlton	7	2022
Jye Amiss	Fremantle	8	2022
Judson Clarke (2)	Richmond	13	2022
Hewago Oea	Gold Coast	16	2022
Elijah Hollands	Gold Coast	19	2022
Samson Ryan # (3)	Richmond	2	2023
Corey Warner	Sydney	5	2023
Ryan Maric	West Coast	13	2023
Patrick Voss	Fremantle	7	2024
Lachie Sullivan	Collingwood	8	2024
Caiden Cleary	Sydney	15	2024
Isaac Kako	Essendon	1	2025
Matthew Jefferson	Melbourne	1	2025
Jack Henderson	Melbourne	1	2025
Tom Edwards	Essendon	2	2025
Isaac Keeler	St Kilda	2	2025
Finnbar Maley	North Melbourne	8	2025
Archer Day-Wicks *	Essendon	9	2025
Luamon Lual	Essendon	13	2025
Charlie West	Collingwood	16	2025
Liam McMahon	Essendon	19	2025
Cooper Trembath	North Melbourne	22	2025
Milan Murdock	West Coast	1	2026
Noah Roberts-Thomson (2)	Richmond	10	2026
Zane Peucker	Richmond	18	2026
Jay Polkinghorne	Geelong	19	2026

== Multiple goals with first kicks ==
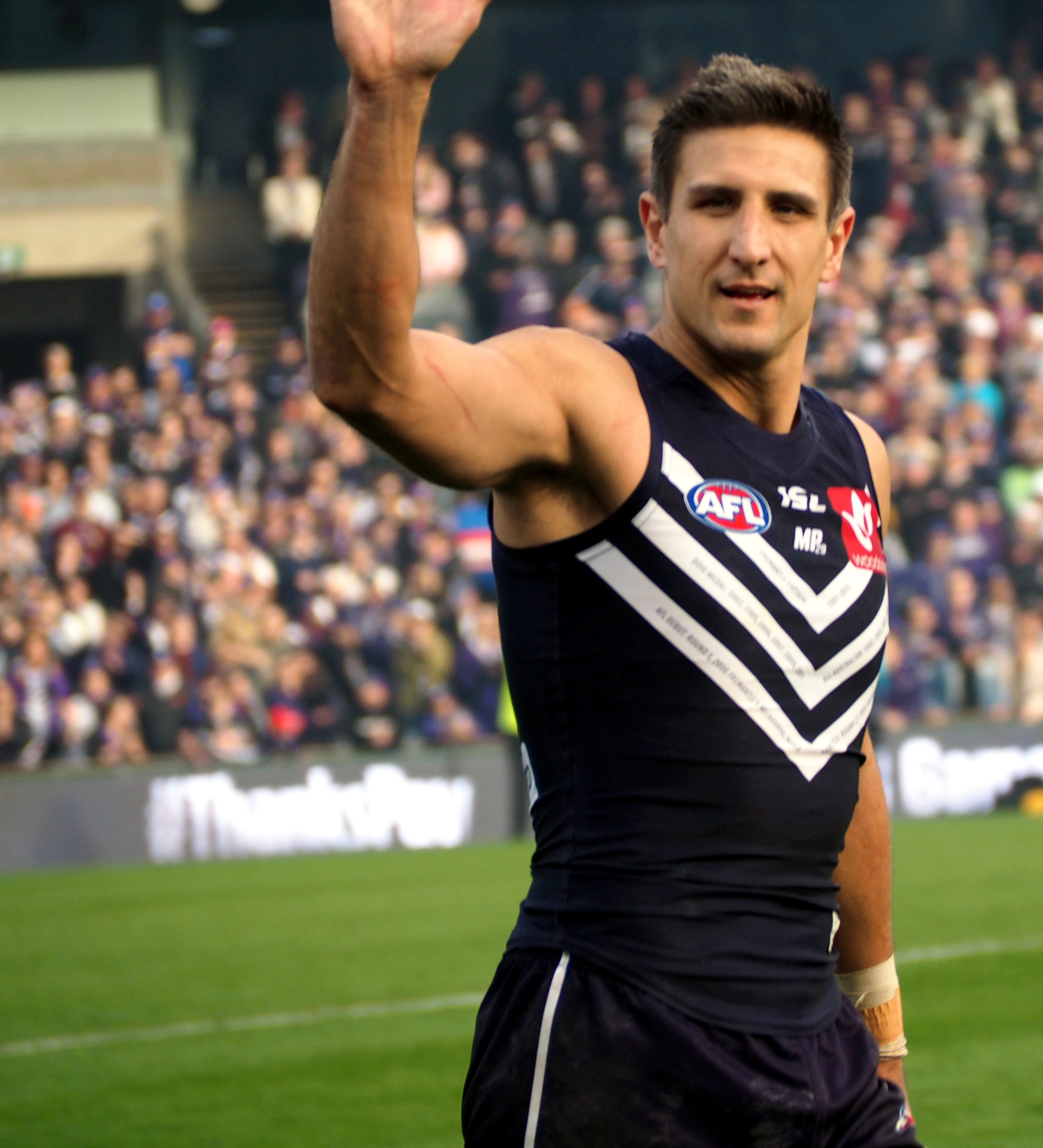
Fremantle's Matthew Pavlich

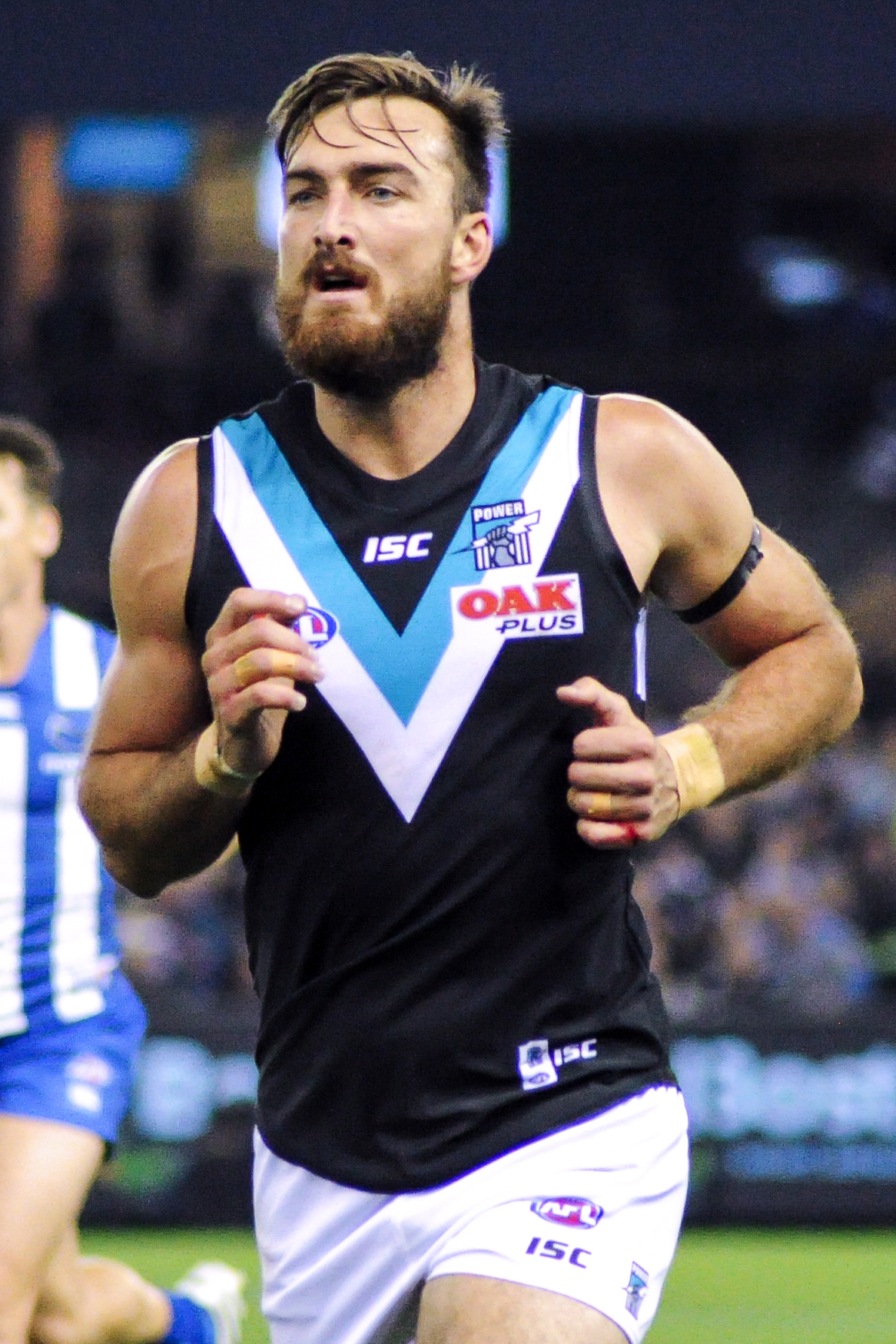
Gold Coast's Charlie Dixon (pictured with Port Adelaide)

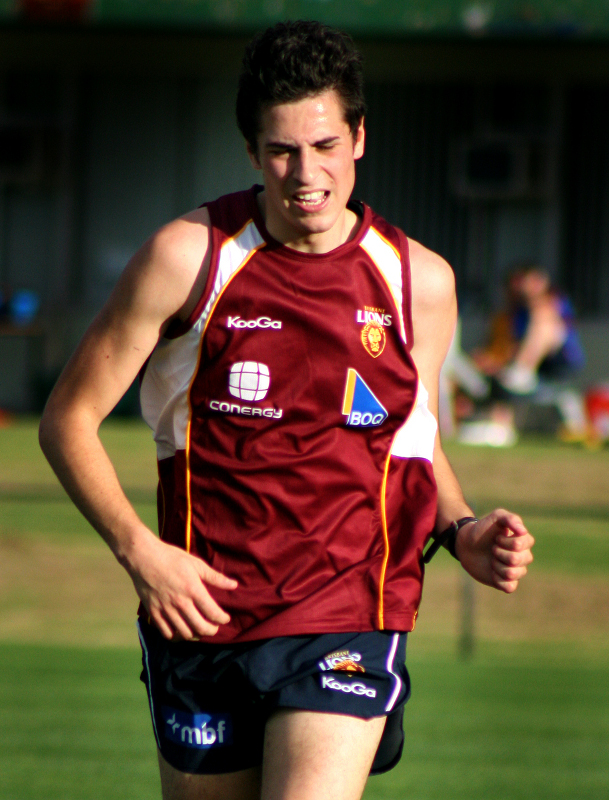
Patrick Karnezis of the Brisbane Lions.

Players to have scored multiple goals with their first kicks
Player	Goals	Club	Rd.	Year
Clen Denning	6	Carlton	4	1935
Richard Lounder	4	Richmond	5	1989
Daniel Metropolis	4	West Coast	3	1992
Michael Tuck	3	Hawthorn	8	1972
Ian Fairley	3	North Melbourne	7	1983
Tim Hargreaves	3	Hawthorn	5	1994
Damian Houlihan	3	Collingwood	7	1994
Marcus Baldwin	3	Geelong	21	2000
Ben Rutten	3	Adelaide	16	2003
Jason Tutt	3	Western Bulldogs	22	2011
Samson Ryan #	3	Richmond	2	2023
Ian Chinn	2	South Melbourne	6	1940
Bob Trainer	2	South Melbourne	13	1950
Stuart Lennie	2	St Kilda	1	1955
Edo Benetti	2	Richmond	8	1961
Vin Waite	2	Carlton	5	1966
Billy Picken	2	Collingwood	5	1974
David Armour	2	Geelong	8	1974
Peter Tossol	2	Melbourne	6	1982
Simon Atkins	2	Footscray	2	1987
John Barnes	2	Essendon	6	1987
Justin Stubbs	2	Essendon	12	1988
Randall Bone	2	Adelaide	3	1992
Michael Dunstan	2	Fitzroy	1	1993
Ilija Grgic	2	Western Bulldogs	2	1993
Scott Cummings	2	Essendon	14	1994
Peter Bell	2	Fremantle	1	1995
Jeff Bruce	2	Fitzroy	9	1995
Mark Stevens	2	North Melbourne	10	1995
Ben Moore	2	Richmond	11	1996
Andrew Pugsley	2	Collingwood	4	1998
Ryan Fitzgerald	2	Sydney	1	2000
Matthew Pavlich	2	Fremantle	5	2000
Brent Staker	2	West Coast	17	2003
Nathan Bock	2	Adelaide	5	2004
Jaymie Graham	2	West Coast	3	2005
Jack Anthony	2	Collingwood	3	2008
Charlie Dixon	2	Gold Coast	2	2011
Jamie Cripps	2	St Kilda	6	2011
Patrick Karnezis	2	Brisbane Lions	13	2011
James Magner	2	Melbourne	1	2012
Sam Weideman	2	Melbourne	20	2016
Judson Clarke	2	Richmond	13	2022
Noah Roberts-Thomson	2	Richmond	10	2026

== Sources ==
- Lovett, Michael, ed. (15 January 2024). AFL Record Season Guide 2024: The official statistical history of the AFL game. Melbourne, Australia: Sports Entertainment Network. pp. 808–809. ISBN 978-0645657333.
