= West Footscray Football Club =

Australian rules football club

West Footscray

Names
- Full name: West Footscray Football Club
- Former name: Tottenham Imperials
- Nickname: Roosters

Club details
- Founded: 1932; 94 years ago
- Colours: Red White
- Competition: Western Region Football League
- President: Darren Burnham
- Coach: Troy Beamond
- Captain: Matthew Grubb
- Premierships: Div 1 Seniors: 5 (1934, 1935, 1947, 1970, 1982) Div 2 Seniors: 2 (1941, 2007) Div 1 Reserves: 4 (1967, 1984, 1985, 1993) Div 2 Reserves: 2 (2007, 2015) Div 2 Women's: 1 (2021- Minor Premiers)
- Ground: Kevin Shorten Reserve

Uniforms
Home

The West Footscray Football Club is an Australian rules football club that is based at Kevin Shorten Reserve in West Footscray.

The club entered the Footscray District Football League in 1932 and won a premiership in 1934 and again in 1935. West Footscray have won five premierships; four in Division 1 and, most recently, the 2007 Division 2 premiership. The club has 2 senior Men's Teams, a Women's Team (Founded in 2018) and 9 junior teams, including under 15 and 12s girls teams, as well as Auskick junior development.

== Notable players ==
- Marty McDonnell, a defender who played 92 VFL games with Footscray, in a war-interrupted career.
- Dick Collinson, played 2 VFL games with Footscray, in 1947.
- Clive Yewers, played 11 VFL games and kicked 4 goals with Footscray, from 1947 to 1948.
- Bernie Laffey, played 4 VFL games with Footscray, in 1949.
- Jim Jewitt, played 2 VFL games and kicked 1 goal with St Kilda, in 1955.
- Laurie Sandilands, a former Footscray captain, who played a total of 164 games with both Footscray and Collingwood.
- Robert McGhie, played juniors at West Footscray in the 1960s before embarking on a 13-year, dual-premiership career in the VFL with Footscray, Richmond, and the South Melbourne Football Clubs. He played at Centre-Half Back in Richmond's 1973 and 1974 premiership teams. He was later a successful coach in the local league, taking his former junior club to premierships in 1982 and 2007. He also coached St Albans to premierships in 1988 and 1989. He also served as part of Footscray's coaching panel.
- Mark Cross, played juniors at West Footscray in the 1970s, he played 4 games and kicked 1 goal for Footscray (1974). He then transferred to the VFA club Williamstown, and he played there from 1975 to 1979, playing 74 games and kicking 125 goals. He was a member of Williamstown's 1976 premiership team and was captain of the VFA Seagulls in his final season. In 1980, Cross joined Red Cliffs, a club in the Sunraysia Football League, which he coached until 1984. He was the senior coach of Mildura Imperials from 1986 to 1989 and steered them to three successive premierships (1986, 1987, 1988). They were undefeated in the 1987 season. He then coached Melbourne's Under-19s and reserves teams. With Cross as coach, the Melbourne reserves were losing grand finalists in 1990 and 1991.
- Terry Wilkins, played juniors at West Footscray in the 1970s, he played 10 games and kicked 16 goals for Footscray (1982-1983). He then transferred to Geelong and played a further 2 games, kicking 3 goals in 1983. He then transferred to the VFA club Sandringham.
- Ross Christensen, played juniors at West Footscray, he played 20 games and kicked 1 goal for Footscray (1973-1974). He then transferred to Melbourne, playing a further 14 games and kicking 1 goal from 1975 to 1976. Christensen continued his career in the VFA. He won a club best and fairest award at Werribee in 1984 and another with Coburg in 1986
- Cameron Wright, played 2 VFL games with Footscray, in 1987.

== Honours ==
- Western Region Football League
  - Division One (5): 1934, 1935, 1947, 1970, 1982
  - Division Two (2): 1941, 2007
