= Leonard Kent =

Leonard Kent may refer to:

- Leonard Kent (cricketer) (1924–2014), New Zealand cricketer
- Bruce Kent (cyclist) (Leonard Bruce Kent, born 1928), New Zealand cyclist
- Len Kent (born 1930), Australian rules footballer
