= Oatway =

Oatway is a locational surname. It may refer to:

- Alby Oatway (1913–1971), Australian rules footballer
- Charlie Oatway (b. 1973), English footballer
- Derek Oatway (1931–2003), Bermudian swimmer
- James Oatway (b. 1978), South African photojournalist
- Kurt Oatway (b. 1984), Canadian sit-skier.
