= Gerald O'Loughlin =

Gerald O'Loughlin may refer to:

- Gerald O'Loughlin (actor) (1921–2015), American performer also credited as Gerald S. O'Loughlin
- Gerald O'Loughlin (footballer) (born 1945), Geelong player in Victorian Football League
