= Ross Christensen =

Australian rules footballer

Personal information
- Born: 6 February 1962 (age 64)
- Original team: West Footscray
- Height: 193 cm (6 ft 4 in)
- Weight: 89 kg (196 lb)

Playing career^{1}
Years	Club	Games (Goals)
1982–1983	Footscray	10 (16)
1983	Geelong	2 (3)
Total		12 (19)
- ^{1} Playing statistics correct to the end of 1983.

Ross Christensen (born 6 February 1962) is a former Australian rules footballer who played with Footscray and Geelong in the Victorian Football League (VFL).

Recruited locally from West Footscray, Christensen played 10 games for Footscray. His best performance came in just his second league game when he kicked five goals in a win over Hawthorn at Western Oval. During the 1983 season he crossed to Geelong, where he would make two senior appearances. Two other players sharing his surname also played for Geelong in the 1980s, Damien and Marty, but they were not related to Ross.

Christensen continued his career in the Victorian Football Association. He won a club best and fairest award at Werribee in 1984 and another with Coburg in 1986.
