= David Armour =

Australian rules footballer (born 1954)

Personal information
- Full name: David Roger Armour
- Born: 23 July 1954 (age 72)
- Original team: St Mary's (Geelong)
- Height: 188 cm (6 ft 2 in)
- Weight: 89 kg (196 lb)

Playing career^{1}
Years	Club	Games (Goals)
1974–1976	Geelong	19 (14)
1977	East Perth	18 (7)
1978–1980	Norwood	69 (42)
- ^{1} Playing statistics correct to the end of 1980.

David Roger Armour (born 23 July 1954) is a former Australian rules footballer who played with Geelong in the Victorian Football League (VFL), East Perth in the Western Australian Football League (WAFL) and Norwood in the South Australian National Football League (SANFL).

== Career ==
Armour, recruited locally from St Mary's, kicked goals with his first two kicks in league football, on debut against Collingwood at Victoria Park in 1974. He finished with four goals. The following week he played against South Melbourne, but had to come off in the third quarter with a thigh injury. He played 10 senior games in the 1975 VFL season and was a member of the Geelong's side which won the VFL reserves premiership that year, with a 31-point grand final win over Richmond. In 1976 he made seven league appearances, then left to join East Perth in the West Australian National Football League, where he played in 1977. He also represented East Perth in the 1977 Ardath Cup (a national competition) and was centre half-back in the team that lost the grand final to South Australian National Football League club Norwood. It was at Norwood that he spent the next three years, which included a premiership in 1978. He then joined Geelong West for the 1981 VFA season.
