= Justin Stubbs =

Australian rules footballer

Personal information
- Born: 25 September 1969 (age 57)
- Original team: Devonport
- Height: 177 cm (5 ft 10 in)
- Weight: 77 kg (170 lb)

Playing career^{1}
Years	Club	Games (Goals)
1988–1990	Essendon	3 (5)
- ^{1} Playing statistics correct to the end of 1990.

Justin Stubbs (born 25 September 1969) is a former Australian rules footballer who played with Essendon in the Victorian/Australian Football League (VFL/AFL).

Stubbs, a Tasmanian Schoolboys All-Australian, played his early football for Devonport. He went to St. Bernard's College after moving to Victoria and represented the state at Teal Cup level.

In the 12th round of the 1988 VFL season, Stubbs made his Essendon debut and kicked goals with his first two kicks in league football (against Fitzroy at Waverley Park). A wingman, Stubbs played again the following round, a loss to Footscray. In 1989 he took a break from league football but returned in 1990 for one final appearance, Essendon's win over Richmond in round 17.
