= Clen Denning =

Australian rules footballer

Personal information
- Full name: Clen Charles Denning
- Born: 28 February 1911; Collingwood, Victoria, Australia
- Died: 9 November 2009 (aged 98); Keysborough, Victoria, Australia
- Original team: Oakleigh (VFA)
- Position: Wing

Playing career^{1}
Years	Club	Games (Goals)
1935–1937	Carlton	18 (23)
1938–1947	Fitzroy	159 (59)
Total		177 (82)
- ^{1} Playing statistics correct to the end of 1947.

Career highlights
- Player in the 1944 Fitzroy Premiership

Clen Charles Denning (28 February 1911 – 9 November 2009) was an Australian rules footballer in the Victorian Football League (VFL).

== Family ==
The son of Thomas Clen Denning (1879–1917), and Agnes Caroline Denning (1880–1974), née Gunther, Clen Charles Denning was born at Collingwood, Victoria on 28 February 1911.

He married Winifred Adelaide Newman (1915–2002) in 1938.

== Football ==
Soon after he turned 16, Denning played for Victorian Football Association (VFA) club Oakleigh. He got his start in the VFL after a long wait when Oakleigh coach Frank Maher moved to coach the Carlton Football Club. Denning debuted with Carlton in 1935.

Early in his career, Denning made a name for himself as a promising goalkicker; he scored six goals from his first six kicks—all in his first match—a record that stands to this day.

He only stayed with Carlton until the end of 1937, having played 18 games for 23 goals.

In 1938, he crossed over to the Fitzroy Football Club, as he was said to be unhappy at Carlton. He scored 37 goals in 1939 to be their leading goalkicker. From then on he focused more on a defensive role, becoming a back pocket. He represented Victoria at interstate football in 1941, and in 1944 he was back pocket in Fitzroy's premiership side.

After leaving Fitzroy, Denning played for and coached Ararat. In 1958, he was the inaugural VFA coach of the Dandenong Football Club.

== Death ==
From the October 2009 death of Jimmy Bates until his own death, at Keysborough, Victoria on 9 November 2009, at 98 years old, he was the oldest living former VFL player, and last surviving member of the 1944 Fitzroy premiership team.
