= Bob Reid (Australian footballer) =

Australian rules footballer (1924–2005)

Personal information
- Full name: Robert Reid
- Born: 8 June 1924
- Died: 10 November 2005 (aged 81)
- Original team: Footscray District League
- Height: 188 cm (6 ft 2 in)
- Weight: 86 kg (190 lb)

Playing career^{1}
Years	Club	Games (Goals)
1948–49	Footscray	19 (27)
- ^{1} Playing statistics correct to the end of 1949.

Robert Reid (8 June 1924 – 10 November 2005) was an Australian rules footballer who played with Footscray in the Victorian Football League (VFL). Reid died on 10 November 2005, at the age of 81.
