= Edo Benetti =

Australian rules footballer (1941–2025)

Personal information
- Full name: Edo Benetti
- Born: 2 December 1941
- Died: 3 March 2025 (aged 83)
- Original team: Wonthaggi
- Height: 183 cm (6 ft 0 in)
- Weight: 80 kg (176 lb)
- Position: Forward

Playing career
Years	Club	Games (Goals)
1961–1962	Richmond	9 (7)

Edo Benetti (2 December 1941 – 3 March 2025) was an Australian rules football player who played for Richmond Football Club in the Victorian Football League (VFL).

Benetti was recruited from Wonthaggi in the South Gippsland Football League. He was the league's leading goalkicker in 1958 and 1959, played in Wonthaggi's premiership side in 1959 and won the league's best and fairest award in 1959 and 1960.

He played at full-forward and on the half-forward flank for the Tigers, kicking seven goals in his nine-game VFL career.

Benetti returned to Wonthaggi for a season in 1963 then, in 1964, played briefly for Yarraville in the Victorian Football Association before a back injury prematurely ended his playing career.
