= Clive Yewers =

Australian rules footballer

Personal information
- Full name: Clive Lawson Yewers
- Born: 16 October 1922; Footscray, Victoria
- Died: 24 August 1975 (aged 52); Hastings, Victoria
- Original team: West Footscray
- Height: 183 cm (6 ft 0 in)
- Weight: 74 kg (163 lb)

Playing career^{1}
Years	Club	Games (Goals)
1947–48	Footscray	11 (4)
- ^{1} Playing statistics correct to the end of 1948.

Clive Lawson Yewers (16 October 1922 – 24 August 1975) was an Australian rules footballer who played with Footscray in the Victorian Football League (VFL).

== Family ==
The son of Harley Le Strange Yewers (1891–1975), and Frances Ellen Yewers (1892–1954), née Carroll, Clive Lawson Yewers was born at Footscray, Victoria on 16 October 1922.

He married Eva Gwendoline Graham in 1947.

== Military service ==
He served in the Second AIF, having enlisted on 30 December 1942.

== Football ==
=== Footscray (VFL) ===
Yewers made his debut for the Footscray First XVIII in the match against South Melbourne, at the Lake Oval, on 28 June 1947. Selected as 20th man, he replaced the injured Arthur Olliver in the second half, and scored a goal with his first kick in VFL football.

=== Yarraville (VFA) ===
Cleared from Footscray in 1949, he played in six senior games in the 1949 season.

== Death ==
He died at Hastings Hospital on 24 August 1975.

== See also ==
- List of first kick/first goal kickers in the VFL/AFL
