= Brendan Littler =

Australian rules footballer

Personal information
- Full name: Brendan Littler
- Born: 21 December 1965 (age 60)
- Original team: Coburg (VFA)
- Height: 185 cm (6 ft 1 in)
- Weight: 80 kg (176 lb)

Playing career^{1}
Years	Club	Games (Goals)
1986	St Kilda	3 (1)
- ^{1} Playing statistics correct to the end of 1986.

Brendan Littler (born 21 December 1965) is a former Australian rules footballer who played with St Kilda in the Victorian Football League (VFL).

Originally from Victorian Football Association (VFA) club Coburg, Littler was recruited by St Kilda ahead of the 1986 VFL season. Making his senior VFL debut in Round 20, against Essendon at Moorabbin Oval, Littler played the last three matches of the Home and Away season before returning to Coburg in 1987.
