= Graham Croft =

Australian rules footballer

Personal information
- Full name: Graham Croft
- Born: 6 September 1947
- Original team: Warragul
- Height: 173 cm (5 ft 8 in)
- Weight: 70 kg (154 lb)
- Position: Rover

Playing career^{1}
Years	Club	Games (Goals)
1966	St Kilda	1 (2)
- ^{1} Playing statistics correct to the end of 1966.

Graham Croft (born 6 September 1947) is a former Australian rules footballer who played with St Kilda in the Victorian Football League (VFL).
