= Ian Chinn =

Australian rules footballer

Personal information
- Full name: Ian Chinn
- Born: 4 May 1917
- Died: 10 February 1956 (aged 38)
- Original team: Eaglehawk (BFL)
- Height: 168 cm (5 ft 6 in)
- Weight: 71 kg (157 lb)

Playing career^{1}
Years	Club	Games (Goals)
1940, 1942	South Melbourne	17 (28)
- ^{1} Playing statistics correct to the end of 1942.

Ian Chinn (4 May 1917 – 10 February 1956) was an Australian rules footballer who played with South Melbourne in the Victorian Football League (VFL).
