= Stuart Lennie =

Australian rules footballer

Personal information
- Full name: Stuart Jackson Lennie
- Born: 16 October 1936
- Died: 15 October 2017 (aged 80)
- Original team: Hampton Rovers
- Height: 183 cm (6 ft 0 in)
- Weight: 77 kg (170 lb)

Playing career^{1}
Years	Club	Games (Goals)
1955	St Kilda	10 (12)
- ^{1} Playing statistics correct to the end of 1955.

Stuart Lennie (16 October 1936 – 15 October 2017) was an Australian rules footballer who played for the St Kilda Football Club in the Victorian Football League (VFL).

He was recruited by St Kilda in 1955 from Hampton Rovers, where he had kicked over 100 goals the previous year.
