= Dave McGlashan =

Australian rules footballer

David McGlashan

Personal information
- Full name: David McGlashan
- Born: 2 January 1958 (age 68)
- Original team: St Kilda City
- Height: 194 cm (6 ft 4 in)
- Weight: 95 kg (209 lb)

Playing career^{1}
Years	Club	Games (Goals)
1981–82	Melbourne	6 (7)
- ^{1} Playing statistics correct to the end of 1982.

Career highlights
- In round ten of 1982 he kicked six goals against Collingwood in a commanding performance.

David McGlashan (born 2 January 1958) is a former Australian rules footballer who played with the Melbourne Football Club in the Victorian Football League (VFL).
