= Ian Randle (footballer) =

Australian rules footballer

Personal information
- Full name: Ian Randle
- Born: 12 July 1942 (age 84)
- Original team: Diamond Creek
- Height: 187 cm (6 ft 2 in)
- Weight: 86 kg (190 lb)

Playing career^{1}
| Years | Club | Games (Goals) |
| 1964 | South Melbourne | 1 (1) |
- ^{1} Playing statistics correct to the end of 1964.

Ian Randle (born 12 July 1942) is a former Australian rules footballer who played with South Melbourne in the Victorian Football League (VFL).
