= Andrew Pugsley =

Australian rules footballer (born 1978)

Personal information
- Born: 25 July 1978 (age 48)
- Original team: Scoresby/Eastern U18
- Debut: 17 April 1998, Collingwood vs. Richmond, at MCG

Playing career^{1}
Years	Club	Games (Goals)
1998	Collingwood	5 (2)
- ^{1} Playing statistics correct to the end of 1998.

Career highlights
- VFL premiership player: 2001

Andrew Pugsley (born 25 July 1978) is a former Australian rules footballer who played for Collingwood in the Australian Football League (AFL).

Pugsley came to Collingwood as a rookie late in 1996 from Scoreseby via Eastern Ranges. His versatility as a forward, where he could play tall and small were valued, and his form in the reserves in 1997 as a goalkicker saw him elevated to the senior list for 1998. He kicked two goals on debut, his first two kicks resulted in goals, a very rare achievement. He played only five games, before being delisted from the club at the end of 98. His final game was the Round 8 Queens Birthday loss to Melbourne where he performed admirably in a losing side taking a strong last quarter mark, however it was not enough to hold his place and he was delisted from the club at the end of 1998.

He sought a further opportunity at Richmond before finding his feet in the Victorian Football League (VFL) with Box Hill, where he won a premiership in 2001 and captained the side during its longest winning streak (2003).

Pugsley has had a distinguished amateurs career, playing a leading role at the Old Scotch Football Club.
