= Randall Bone =

Australian rules footballer, born 1973

Personal information
- Full name: Randall Bone
- Born: 13 November 1973 (age 52)
- Original team: South Adelaide
- Height: 194 cm (6 ft 4 in)
- Weight: 98 kg (216 lb)

Playing career^{1}
Years	Club	Games (Goals)
1992–1993	Adelaide	12 (13)
1995–1998	Hawthorn	16 (4)
Total		28 (17)
- ^{1} Playing statistics correct to the end of 1998.

Randall Bone (born 13 November 1973) is a former Australian rules footballer in the Australian Football League.

Recruited from South Australian National Football League club South Adelaide, Bone made his AFL debut for Adelaide in 1992, playing 12 games and kicking 13 goals. He then moved to Hawthorn in 1995, where he played 16 games and kicked 4 goals in four seasons.
