= Des O'Dwyer =

Australian rules footballer

Personal information
- Full name: Des O'Dwyer
- Born: 24 August 1961 (age 65)
- Original team: Shepparton United
- Height: 187 cm (6 ft 2 in)
- Weight: 83 kg (183 lb)

Playing career^{1}
Years	Club	Games (Goals)
1978, 1981–82	Melbourne (VFL)	8 (5)
1983-1985	Norwood (SANFL)	21 (50)
1986-1990	Woodville (SANFL)	105 (7)
1991	Woodville-West Torrens (SANFL)	17 (4)
Total		151 (66)
- ^{1} Playing statistics correct to the end of 1991.

Des O'Dwyer (born 24 August 1961) is a former Australian rules footballer who played with Melbourne in the Victorian Football League (VFL) and Norwood, Woodville and Woodville-West Torrens in the South Australian National Football League (SANFL).
