= Len Kent =

Australian rules footballer (1930–2024)

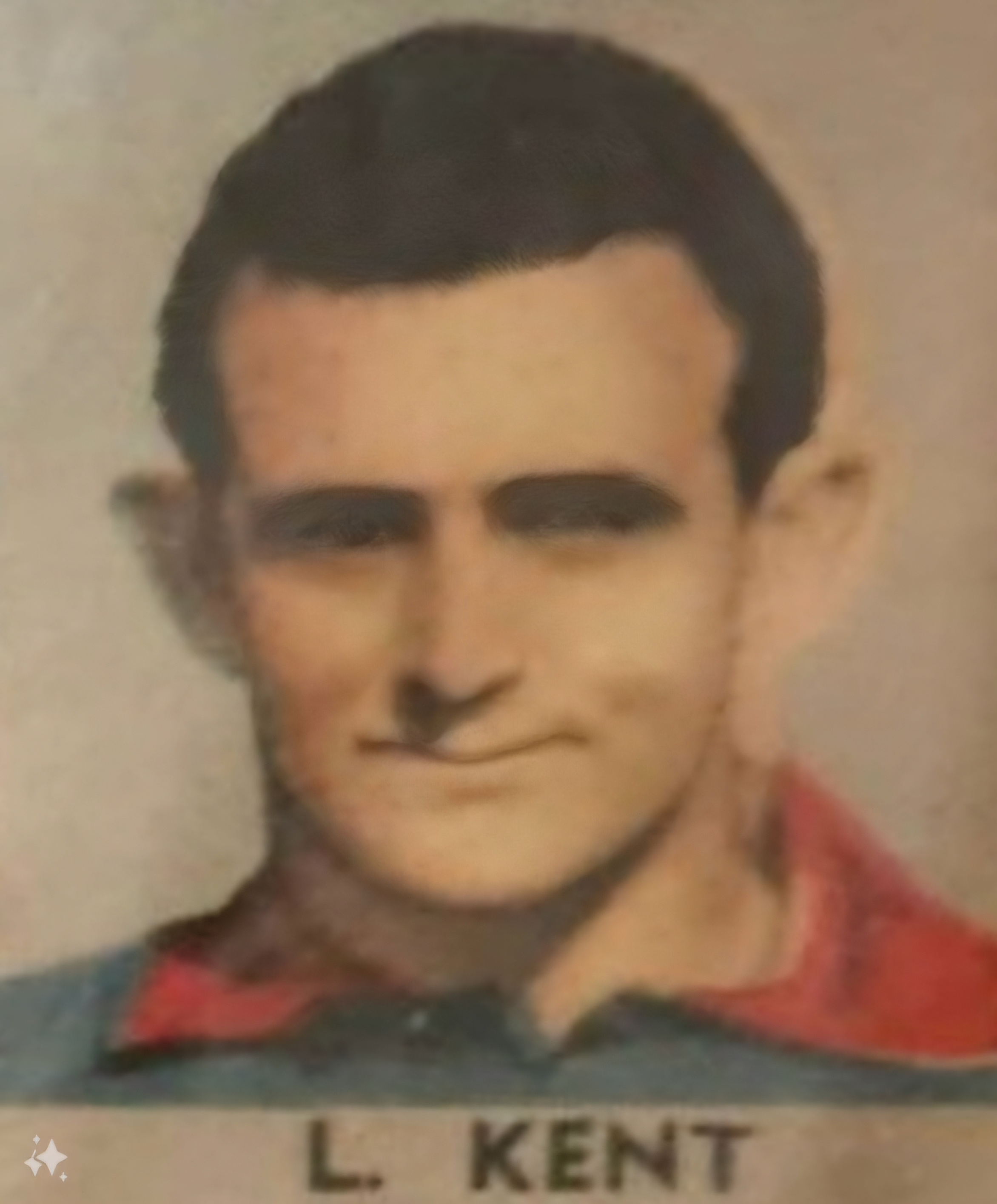

Personal information
- Full name: Len Kent
- Born: 16 June 1930; Ballarat, Victoria, Australia
- Died: 31 August 2024 (aged 94)
- Height: 185 cm (6 ft 1 in)
- Weight: 80 kg (176 lb)

Playing career^{1}
Years	Club	Games (Goals)
1951–53	Footscray	24 (19)
- ^{1} Playing statistics correct to the end of 1953.

Len Kent (16 June 1930 – 31 August 2024) was an Australian rules footballer who played with Footscray in the Victorian Football League (VFL). He also played for Williamstown Seagulls in the VFA from 1953 to 1959, and was honoured in the Williamstown Football Club Team of the Century. Kent died on 31 August 2024, at the age of 94.
