= Gerald O'Loughlin (footballer) =

Australian rules footballer

Gerald (Soapy) O'Loughlin

Personal information
- Full name: Gerald O'Loughlin
- Born: 20 November 1945 (age 80)
- Height: 175 cm (5 ft 9 in)
- Weight: 73 kg (161 lb)

Playing career^{1}
Years	Club	Games (Goals)
1968	Geelong	1 (1)
- ^{1} Playing statistics correct to the end of 1968.

Gerald O'Loughlin (born 20 November 1945) is a former Australian rules footballer who played with Geelong in the Victorian Football League (VFL).
