= Alby Oatway =

Australian rules footballer, born 1913

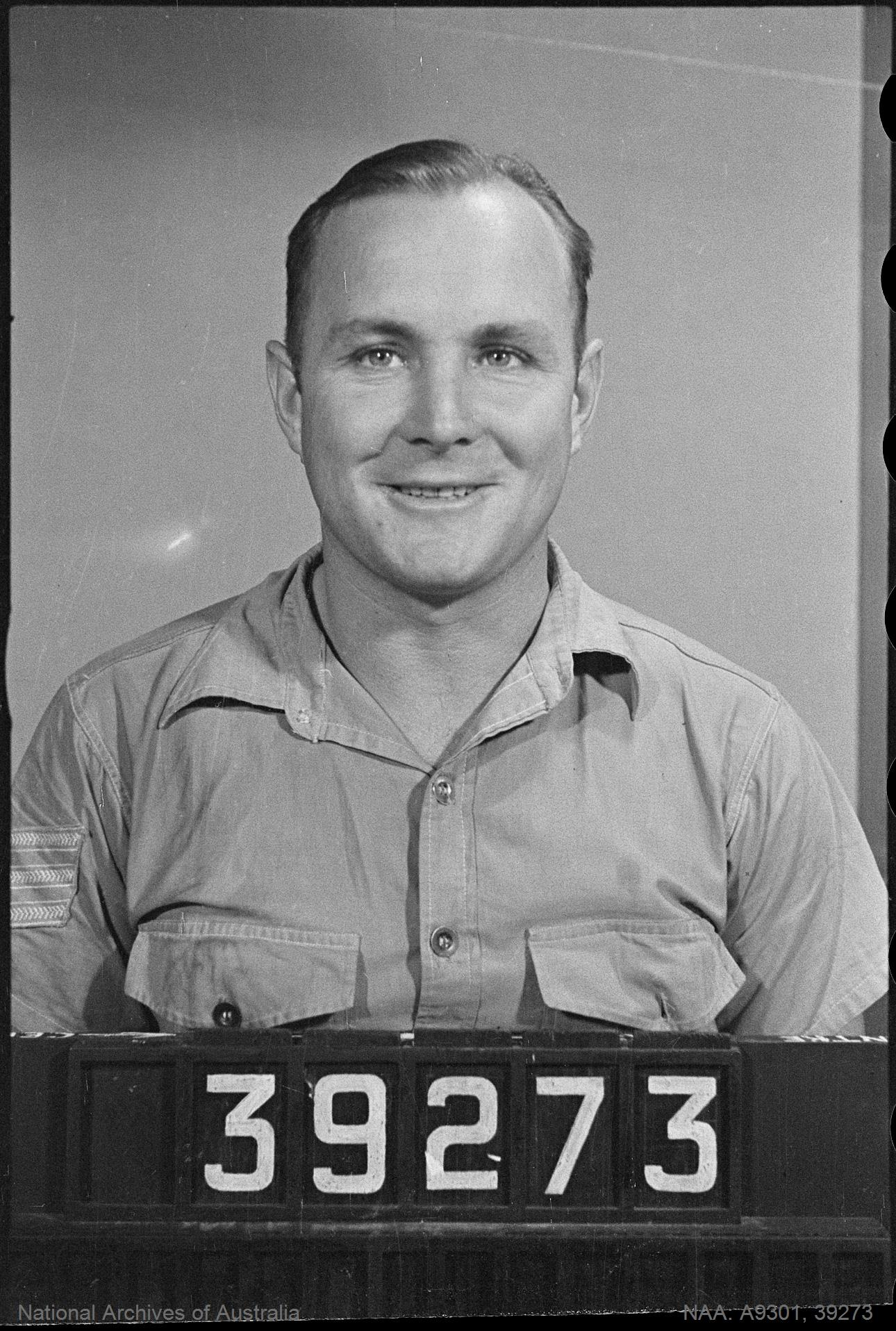
- Alby Oatway in 1941

Personal information
- Full name: Albert Edward Oatway
- Born: 29 September 1913; Hindmarsh, South Australia
- Died: 20 February 1971 (aged 57); Adelaide, South Australia
- Original team: North Adelaide (SANFL)
- Height: 184 cm (6 ft 0 in)
- Weight: 88 kg (194 lb)

Playing career^{1}
Years	Club	Games (Goals)
1941	St Kilda	1 (1)
- ^{1} Playing statistics correct to the end of 1941.

Albert Edward Oatway (29 September 1913 – 20 February 1971) was a leading Australian rules footballer and businessman who played for the St Kilda Football Club in the Victorian Football League (VFL) and North Adelaide, West Adelaide and West Adelaide-Glenelg in the South Australian National Football League (SANFL).

Nicknamed "Pompey", Oatway was born in Adelaide and attended Kilburn Primary School and Adelaide High School, and played for North Adelaide throughout the 1930s, winning the award for "Best Ruckman" in the North Adelaide reserves in 1934 and "Best attention to training with results" for the North seniors in 1936.

Work commitments with engineering company William Adams & Co led to his occasional unavailability for North and he missed most of the 1937 season when he lost control of his car, overturning it, and required hospitalisation for a broken kneecap.

Oatway was also no stranger to law enforcement; in 1931 he and two others were convicted of being unlawfully on a premises and each fined £1 with £1 costs and ordered to pay £1 6/8 to cover damages to the property, while in June 1938 he was convicted of continually blaring his car horn "to produce an offensive noise" near an Adelaide hospital in the early hours of the morning. Fined 10 shillings with a further 10 shillings cost, Oatway claimed that the horn had stuck and regretted the noise made.

== War years ==
In 1940, Oatway moved to Port Pirie, and while Port Pirie Football Association (PPFA) club St Mark's registered him early in the year and he trained with the club, Oatway continued to play for North Adelaide until mid-season. Oatway was not officially registered by PPFA officials until minutes before the start of his debut on 20 July 1940 for St Mark's, against Solomontown, which drew a protest by Solomontown officials. PPFA commissioners later ruled that Oatway was ineligible to play for St Mark's on 20 July but this did not preclude him from playing again that season.

Oatway returned to Adelaide in 1941, transferring to SANFL club West Adelaide before enlisting in the Royal Australian Air Force, and mustered as an equipment assistant with the Air Gunnery School, gaining the rank of Leading Aircraftman. Oatway was transferred to Melbourne on RAAF duty and was added to St Kilda's playing list after he successfully applied for a player permit. Oatway's VFL debut was delayed due to "severe leg bruises" but eventually played for St Kilda, against Hawthorn at Glenferrie Oval on 12 July 1941, kicking one goal in St Kilda's loss. Oatway continued to train with St Kilda but his unavailabilty due to his RAAF duties meant he did not play again. Instead, Oatway played for RAAF football teams, including for the Victorian RAAF team to play New South Wales in Sydney on 26 July 1941.

In 1942 Oatway was back in Adelaide and played for the combined West Adelaide-Glenelg side in the revamped SANFL competition.

== Post war ==
Following his discharge from the Air Force at the end of World War II, Oatway opened Servicemen's Stores in Commercial Road, Port Adelaide, which quickly grew "at a rate comparable only with a Hollywood film success story" and soon expanded to further sites in Adelaide and surrounding towns. He owned the Lion Hotel in Melbourne Street, North Adelaide for some years and opened Enfield Hardware which soon expanded to four locations; Oatway claimed that the secret of his business success was offering free beer during sales. In 1954, Oatway was fined £15 and £12/17/6 for not disclosing to the South Australian Potato Board where he sourced the potatoes he was selling at Servicemen's Stores during the potato famine of 1953.

After finishing his SANFL career, Oatway joined local RASL League club Prospect, where he made news in 1949 for betting £3 at 33/1 at the start of the season on Prospect winning the 1949 premiership, and then, during the last moments of the Grand Final against Edwardstown, with Prospect trailing by four points, he was awarded a free in the goalsquare. His kick went out of bounds on the full. Oatway also captained Prospect RSL's billiards and snooker team, taking home the Freddie Bickmore Shield for winning the 1962, 1963, 1964 and 1966 RSL billiards and snooker championships.

Oatway was appointed to North Adelaide's committee in 1947 and caused controversy in 1948 when he was charged with using abusive language against an umpire after a match at North's homeground Prospect Oval.

His high profile in the Port Adelaide community led to Oatway's involvement with the Port Adelaide Football Club, serving as Vice-President, and Patron of the Port Adelaide junior sides. Oatway also coached West Adelaide's reserve team, and wrote a weekly football column for Messenger newspaper. He was also a successful racehorse owner, with one of his horses, Laimell, winning major races, including the 1949 Arlington Handicap at Moonee Valley.

Married to Gloria and with three children, Oatway died 20 February 1971, aged 57.

== Sources ==
- Cullen, B. (2015) Harder than Football, Slattery Media Group: Melbourne. ISBN 9780992379148.
