= 1996 Fitzroy Football Club season =

113th season of the Fitzroy Football Club

Fitzroy Football Club
1996 season
- President: Dyson Hore-Lacy
- Coach: Mick Nunan (R1–R14); Alan McConnell (R15–R22)
- Captain: Brad Boyd
- Home ground: Whitten Oval; Optus Oval
- Home-and-away: 16th (last)
- Mitchell Medal: Martin Pike
- Leading goalkicker: Anthony Mellington (22)
- Highest home attendance: 13,497 (Round 6 vs Richmond)
- Lowest home attendance: 5,083 (Round 8 vs Fremantle)
- Average home attendance: ▼9,482
- Club membership: ▼7,628

The 1996 season was the 100th and final season of the Fitzroy Football Club in the Australian Football League (AFL) and its 113th season overall. The year saw significant turmoil for the club, which announced during the season that it would merge with the Brisbane Bears.

Fitzroy claimed the wooden spoon after finishing last on the ladder for the second season in a row and seventh season overall. The club won just one senior match, defeating Fremantle by 31 points at Whitten Oval in round 8. Its final-ever AFL match was also against Fremantle, when it was defeated by 86 points at Subiaco Oval in round 22. In the reserves competition, Fitzroy finished tenth out of twelve teams and won seven matches, including its last match of the season.

Following the conclusion of the season, Fitzroy's AFL operations were merged into those of the Brisbane Bears, who became the Brisbane Lions from 1997. Fitzroy did not resume playing operations until 2009, when it merged with the Fitzroy Reds and entered the Victorian Amateur Football Association (VAFA).

== Season summary ==
=== Financial troubles and merger ===
During the 1986 season, Fitzroy was more than one million dollars in debt. A merger with Melbourne was proposed but did not occur, while another merger with Footscray was announced in October 1989 but collapsed after Footscray supporters secured sufficient money and sponsors to prevent it from taking place. In 1995, Fitzroy general manager John Birt said the club was "strong enough to be here for many years to come".

On 28 June 1996, the Nauru Insurance Company (a creditor of the Fitzroy Football Club), appointed Michael Brennan to administer the affairs of the club to ensure a loan of A$1.25 million was to be repaid. During the season, there were fears that the club would collapse mid-season because of its lack of cash, but this was averted when the AFL guaranteed funds that allowed Fitzroy to continue in the competition for the remainder of the season.

Discussions were most advanced with North Melbourne. By the beginning of July 1996, Fitzroy had agreed to arrangements to become the North Fitzroy Kangaroos Football Club. Negotiations for elements including the new club's colours, guernsey and song were to be settled by the morning of 4 July 1996 by the Fitzroy board. However, later that afternoon, Brennan (who had been appointed to temporarily replace Fitzroy's board) agreed to merge the club's AFL operations with the Brisbane Bears, with the agreement of the AFL Commission and a majority vote of the AFL's constituent clubs. AFL chairman Ross Oakley described the Fitzroy–Brisbane merger as "the absolute best outcome for the competition".

=== Round 8: Final AFL win ===
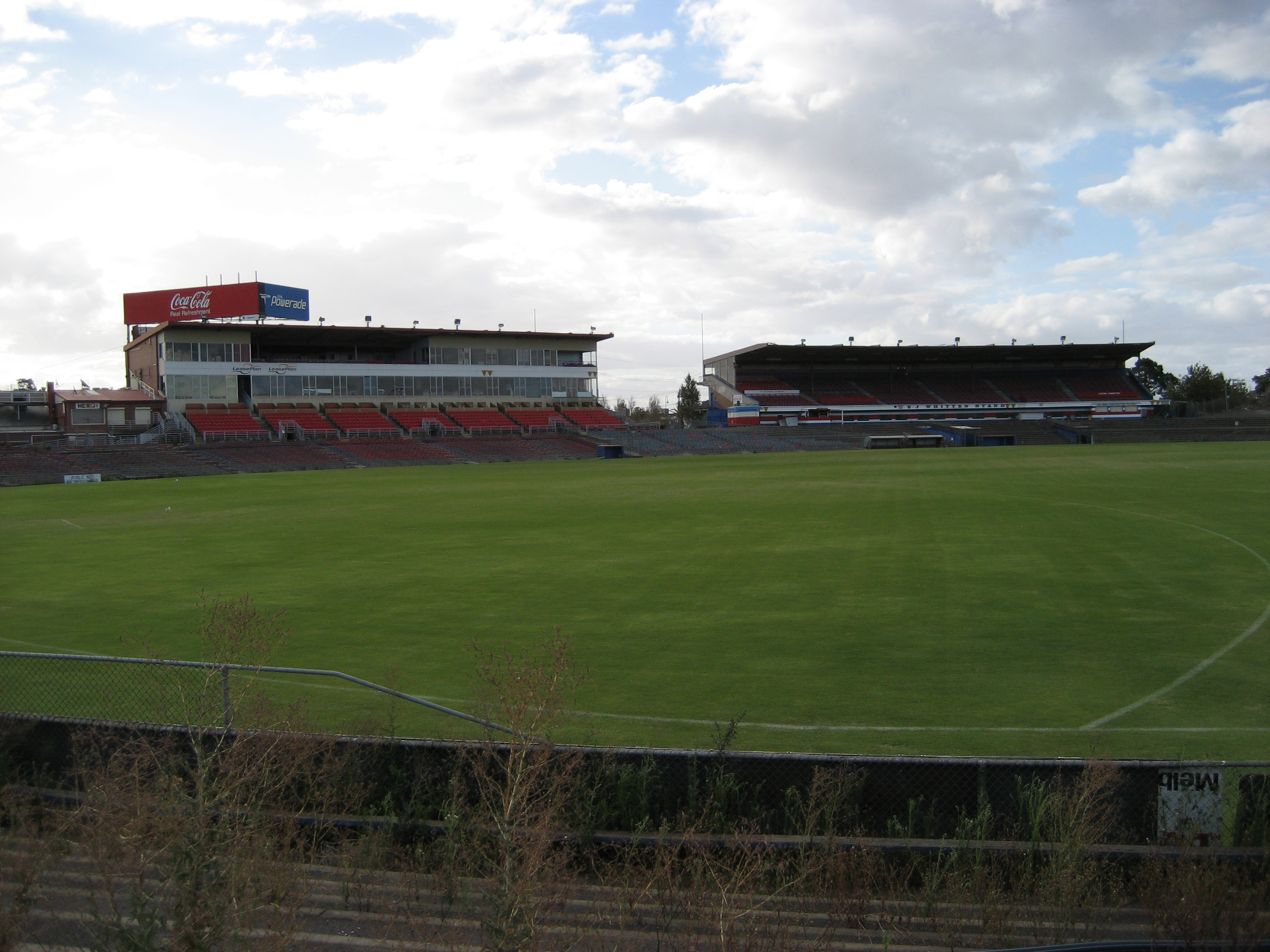
Whitten Oval pictured in 2007; this was Fitzroy's final VFL/AFL primary home ground and its fourth since leaving Brunswick Street Oval at the end of 1966

Fitzroy's final win in the AFL occurred on 18 May 1996 at Whitten Oval. The Lions were playing Fremantle, who had won three of their first seven matches of the season but were coming off a 96-point loss to Adelaide. Fitzroy had lost to Fremantle on two occasions during the 1995 season, including in round 3, which was Fremantle's first AFL victory.

The Lions led at every break and won the match by 31 points. Anthony Mellington kicked four goals, while Chris Johnson recorded 24 disposals and kicked three goals to earn three Brownlow Medal votes.

It was Fitzroy's first win since round 8 of the 1995 season (364 days prior), ending a 21-match losing streak; its next senior win was in the Victorian Amateur Football Association (VAFA) almost 13 years later, when they defeated Prahran on 18 April 2009. The crowd of 5,083 was the lowest for any AFL match in 1996, the lowest VFL/AFL crowd at Whitten/Western Oval since 1934, and the lowest-ever crowd for a Fitzroy match at the venue.

== Playing list ==
A total of 36 players played senior matches for Fitzroy during the 1996 season. Chris Johnson, who later played 205 matches with the Brisbane Lions, was the last remaining player to have been on Fitzroy's AFL list when he retired at the end of 2007.

No.	Player	Statistics (season)		Statistics (career)	
No.	Player	Games	Goals	Games	Goals
1	Brad Boyd	16	6	70	49
2	Chris Johnson	22	19	59	67
3	Anthony Mellington	18	22	24	24
4	Stephen Paxman	21	4	102	18
5	John Barker	21	9	47	12
6	Brian McInnes	0	0	0	0
7	Jarrod Molloy	19	13	59	54
8	Martin Pike	22	5	60	40
9	Jason Ramsey	2	0	2	0
10	Jeff Hogg	14	7	184	347
11	Anthony McGregor	6	3	41	11
12	Matthew Primus	20	5	20	5
13	Brent Frewen	2	0	2	0
14	Frank Bizzotto	4	0	38	4
15	Robert McMahon	2	1	2	1
16	Mark Zanotti	0	0	157	19
17	Simon Hawking	16	15	60	30
18	Nick Mitchell	0	0	9	2
19	Darren Holmes	7	1	63	9
20	Mick Dwyer	8	3	88	64
21	Andrew Cavedon	0	0	28	21
22	Scott Bamford	22	6	22	6
23	Simon Atkins	19	6	168	69
24	Trent Cummings	11	5	27	18
25	John McCarthy	18	11	163	178
26	Matthew Manfield	4	0	5	0
27	Brett Chandler	16	2	28	2
28	Peter Doyle	7	1	12	2
29	Brad Cassidy	14	10	14	10
30	Nick Carter	17	4	17	4
31	Matthew Dent	19	6	47	9
32	Jason Baldwin	11	1	125	36
33	Rowan Warfe	16	0	26	1
34	Danny Morton	16	9	30	17
35	Brett Cook	4	0	25	7
36	Wayne Lamb	3	3	21	13
37	John Rombotis	22	15	26	16
38	Adam McCarthy	2	0	30	12
39	Marty Warry	5	11	8	11
40	Shane Clayton	13	1	13	1
41	Peter Bird	3	2	15	7
42	Nigel Credlin	0	0	0	0

== AFL season ==
=== Lightning Premiership ===
Rd	Date and local time	Opponent	Scores (Fitzroy's scores indicated in bold)			Venue	Crowd	Ladder
Rd	Date and local time	Opponent	Home	Away	Result	Venue	Crowd	Ladder
1	Friday, 9 February (7:30 pm)	Collingwood	**2.5 (17)**	6.4 (40)	Lost by 23 points	Waverley Park	—	—

=== Ansett Australia Cup ===
Rd	Date and local time	Opponent	Scores (Fitzroy's scores indicated in bold)			Venue	Crowd	Ladder
Rd	Date and local time	Opponent	Home	Away	Result	Venue	Crowd	Ladder
1	Monday, 26 February (8:00 pm)	Footscray	**12.15 (87)**	16.15 (111)	Lost by 24 points	Waverley Park	4,818	—

=== Home-and-away season ===
Rd	Date and local time	Opponent	Scores (Fitzroy's scores indicated in bold)			Venue	Crowd	Ladder
Rd	Date and local time	Opponent	Home	Away	Result	Venue	Crowd	Ladder
1	Saturday, 30 March (2:10 pm)	Hawthorn	**11.5 (71)**	13.14 (92)	Lost by 21 points	Whitten Oval (H)	10,239	12th
2	Saturday, 6 April (2:10 pm)	Adelaide	**15.11 (101)**	21.7 (133)	Lost by 32 points	Whitten Oval (H)	8,685	13th
3	Saturday, 13 April (2:10 pm)	Footscray	17.19 (121)	**10.10 (70)**	Lost by 51 points	Whitten Oval (A)	14,345	16th
4	Saturday, 20 April (2:10 pm)	St Kilda	24.16 (160)	**11.9 (75)**	Lost by 85 points	Waverley Park (A)	17,625	16th
5	Sunday, 28 April (2:10 pm)	Brisbane Bears	24.14 (158)	**6.13 (49)**	Lost by 109 points	The Gabba (A)	14,495	16th
6	Saturday, 4 May (2:10 pm)	Richmond	**9.8 (62)**	23.16 (154)	Lost by 92 points	Whitten Oval (H)	13,497	16th
7	Saturday, 11 May (2:10 pm)	Carlton	18.17 (125)	**8.14 (62)**	Lost by 63 points	Optus Oval (A)	16,176	16th
8	Saturday, 18 May (2:10 pm)	Fremantle	**16.11 (107)**	10.16 (76)	Won by 31 points	Whitten Oval (H)	5,083	15th
9	Friday, 24 May (8:10 pm)	North Melbourne	25.20 (170)	**9.11 (65)**	Lost by 105 points	MCG (A)	19,964	15th
10	Saturday, 8 June (2:10 pm)	Sydney	**10.7 (67)**	21.11 (137)	Lost by 70 points	Whitten Oval (H)	9,701	16th
11	Sunday, 16 June (2:10 pm)	Melbourne	**8.8 (56)**	18.11 (119)	Lost by 63 points	Whitten Oval (H)	10,836	16th
12	Saturday, 22 June (2:10 pm)	Hawthorn	17.12 (114)	**12.11 (83)**	Lost by 31 points	Waverley Park (A)	16,217	16th
13	Saturday, 29 June (2:10 pm)	Geelong	**6.3 (39)**	25.16 (166)	Lost by 127 points	Whitten Oval (H)	10,504	16th
14	Saturday, 6 July (2:10 pm)	Essendon	**7.10 (52)**	17.16 (118)	Lost by 66 points	Optus Oval (H)	12,748	16th
15	Friday, 12 July (6:40 pm)	West Coast	20.11 (131)	**9.9 (63)**	Lost by 68 points	WACA (A)	22,044	16th
16	Sunday, 21 July (2:10 pm)	Collingwood	17.14 (116)	**10.16 (76)**	Lost by 40 points	Victoria Park (A)	23,567	16th
17	Sunday, 28 July (12:40 pm)	Adelaide	26.10 (166)	**9.13 (67)**	Lost by 99 points	Football Park (A)	31,880	16th
18	Sunday, 4 August (2:10 pm)	Footscray	**6.9 (45)**	8.12 (60)	Lost by 15 points	Whitten Oval (H)	8,757	16th
19	Saturday, 10 August (2:10 pm)	St Kilda	**5.5 (35)**	13.10 (88)	Lost by 53 points	Whitten Oval (H)	7,781	16th
20	Saturday, 17 August (2:10 pm)	Brisbane Bears	**14.16 (100)**	29.13 (187)	Lost by 87 points	Optus Oval (H)	6,469	16th
21	Sunday, 25 August (2:10 pm)	Richmond	28.19 (187)	**5.6 (36)**	Lost by 151 points	MCG (A)	48,884	16th
22	Sunday, 1 September (12:10 pm)	Fremantle	24.13 (157)	**10.11 (71)**	Lost by 86 points	Subiaco Oval (A)	22,574	16th

=== Ladder ===
Pos	Team	Pld	W	L	D	PF	PA	PP	Pts	Qualification
1	Sydney	22	16	5	1	2152	1737	123.9	66	Finals series
2	North Melbourne (P)	22	16	6	0	2526	1982	127.4	64	Finals series
3	Brisbane Bears	22	15	6	1	2174	1731	125.6	62	Finals series
4	West Coast	22	15	7	0	2201	1758	125.2	60	Finals series
5	Carlton	22	15	7	0	2116	1909	110.8	60	Finals series
6	Essendon	22	14	7	1	2209	2023	109.2	58	Finals series
7	Geelong	22	13	8	1	2353	2047	114.9	54	Finals series
8	Hawthorn	22	11	10	1	1893	1921	98.5	46	Finals series
9	Richmond	22	11	11	0	2282	1944	117.4	44	
10	St Kilda	22	10	12	0	2053	2033	101.0	40	
11	Collingwood	22	9	13	0	2203	2142	102.8	36	
12	Adelaide	22	8	14	0	2233	2327	96.0	32	
13	Fremantle	22	7	15	0	1830	1983	92.3	28	
14	Melbourne	22	7	15	0	1743	2463	70.8	28	
15	Footscray	22	5	16	1	1654	2139	77.3	22	
**16**	Fitzroy	**22**	**1**	**21**	**0**	**1452**	**2935**	**49.5**	4	

Source: AFL Tables
Rules for classification: 1) points; 2) percentage; 3) number of points for.
(P) Premiers

== Reserves season ==
=== Home-and-away season ===
Rd	Date and local time	Opponent	Scores (Fitzroy's scores indicated in bold)			Venue	Crowd	Ladder
Rd	Date and local time	Opponent	Home	Away	Result	Venue	Crowd	Ladder
1	Saturday, 30 March (11:15 am)	Hawthorn	**9.7 (61)**	9.13 (67)	Lost by 6 points	Whitten Oval (H)	—	7th
2	Sunday, 7 April (10:50 am)	Sydney	26.16 (172)	**13.14 (92)**	Lost by 80 points	SCG (A)	—	11th
3	Saturday, 13 April (11:15 am)	Footscray	9.3 (57)	**8.18 (66)**	Won by 9 points	Whitten Oval (A)	—	10th
4	Saturday, 20 April (11:15 am)	St Kilda	11.16 (82)	**24.13 (157)**	Won by 75 points	Waverley Park (A)	—	6th
5	Saturday, 27 April (11:15 am)	Carlton	26.12 (168)	**17.9 (111)**	Lost by 57 points	Optus Oval (A)	—	8th
6	Saturday, 4 May (11:15 am)	Richmond	**24.11 (155)**	9.11 (65)	Won by 90 points	Whitten Oval (H)	—	6th
7	Saturday, 11 May (11:00 am)	Carlton	10.10 (70)	**23.11 (149)**	Won by 79 points	Optus Oval (A)	—	5th
8	Saturday, 18 May (11:15 am)	Collingwood	**11.5 (71)**	16.14 (110)	Lost by 39 points	Whitten Oval (H)	—	8th
9	Friday, 24 May (5:15 pm)	North Melbourne	14.19 (103)	**12.14 (86)**	Lost by 17 points	MCG (A)	—	6th
10	Saturday, 8 June (11:15 am)	Sydney	**12.4 (76)**	13.14 (92)	Lost by 16 points	Whitten Oval (H)	—	8th
11	Sunday, 16 June (11:15 am)	Melbourne	**14.11 (95)**	14.16 (100)	Lost by 5 points	Whitten Oval (H)	—	9th
12	Saturday, 22 June (11:15 am)	Hawthorn	12.11 (83)	**21.8 (134)**	Won by 51 points	Waverley Park (A)	—	9th
13	Saturday, 29 June (11:15 am)	Geelong	**9.6 (60)**	15.18 (108)	Lost by 48 points	Whitten Oval (H)	—	9th
14	Saturday, 6 July (10:45 am)	Essendon	11.14 (80)	**10.10 (70)**	Lost by 10 points	Windy Hill (A)	—	10th
15	Sunday, 14 July (11:00 am)	Footscray	14.19 (103)	**14.11 (95)**	Lost by 8 points	Whitten Oval (A)	—	10th
16	Sunday, 21 July (11:15 am)	Collingwood	15.9 (99)	**11.9 (75)**	Lost by 24 points	Victoria Park (A)	—	10th
17	Saturday, 27 July (11:15 am)	Sydney	**11.10 (76)**	14.16 (100)	Lost by 24 points	Whitten Oval (H)	—	10th
18	Sunday, 4 August (12:00 pm)	Footscray	**7.6 (48)**	15.10 (100)	Lost by 52 points	Whitten Oval (H)	—	10th
19	Saturday, 10 August (10:00 am)	St Kilda	14.13 (97)	**12.10 (82)**	Lost by 15 points	Moorabbin Oval (A)	—	11th
20	Saturday, 17 August (11:15 am)	Carlton	11.11 (77)	**10.3 (63)**	Lost by 14 points	Optus Oval (H)	—	12th
21	Sunday, 25 August (11:05 am)	Richmond	11.9 (75)	**19.21 (135)**	Won by 60 points	MCG (A)	—	11th
22	Saturday, 31 August (11:15 am)	St Kilda	9.9 (63)	**16.12 (108)**	Won by 45 points	Waverley Park (A)	—	10th

== Awards and milestones ==
Robert McMahon was Fitzroy's 1157th VFL/AFL player and final AFL debutant.

=== Milestones ===
Rd	Player	Milestone	Opponent	Venue	Ref
1	Scott Bamford	AFL debut	Hawthorn	Whitten Oval	
1	Brad Cassidy	AFL debut	Hawthorn	Whitten Oval	
1	Matthew Primus	AFL debut	Hawthorn	Whitten Oval	
1	Mick Dwyer	Club debut	Hawthorn	Whitten Oval	
6	Nick Carter	AFL debut	Richmond	Whitten Oval	
6	Shane Clayton	AFL debut	Richmond	Whitten Oval	
6	Brent Frewen	AFL debut	Richmond	Whitten Oval	
13	Jason Ramsey	AFL debut	Geelong	Whitten Oval	
18	Robert McMahon	AFL debut	Footscray	Whitten Oval	
20	Stephen Paxman	100th AFL game	Brisbane Bears	Optus Oval	

== See also ==
- 1996 Brisbane Bears season
