= 1996 Brisbane Bears season =

10th season of the Brisbane Bears

Brisbane Bears
1996 season
- President: Noel Gordon
- Coach: John Northey
- Captain: Roger Merrett
- Home ground: The Gabba
- Home-and-away: 3rd
- Finals series: Preliminary final
- Club Champion: Michael Voss
- Leading goalkicker: Alastair Lynch (52)
- Highest home attendance: 21,644 (Round 8 vs Collingwood)
- Lowest home attendance: 14,222 (Round 1 vs Footscray)
- Average home attendance: ▲18,088
- Club membership: ▲10,267

The 1996 season was the tenth season of the Brisbane Bears in the Australian Football League (AFL). It was the final year of the Bears before it merged with the Fitzroy Football Club, competing in the AFL as the Brisbane Lions from 1997 onwards.

Brisbane had its most successful season to date in 1996, finishing third on the ladder at the end of the home-and-away season to reach the finals series for the second year in a row and the second time in club history. The Bears won two finals, both played at the Gabba, before losing to eventual premiers North Melbourne in the preliminary final.

Following the conclusion of the season, the Bears took over Fitzroy's AFL assets as part of a deal negotiated by the AFL, which resulted in the club changing its name to the Brisbane Bears-Fitzroy Football Club (trading as the Brisbane Lions).

== Season summary ==
Brisbane began the 1996 home-and-away season with an 87-point victory over Footscray at the Gabba in front of a crowd of 14,222 people, which would be the lowest home crowd for the Bears during the year. The club won seven of their first eight matches before losing to Sydney by 58 points in round 9, which was followed by a draw against Geelong and a loss to Carlton.

While Brisbane was able to recover at the mid-point of the season with a 77-point win over Melbourne, two losses away from home against St Kilda and Adelaide saw the Bears fall to seventh place on the ladder, just six weeks after sitting in first. It was around this time that Fitzroy administrator Michael Brennan agreed to merge the club's AFL operations with Brisbane, with the agreement of the AFL Commission and a majority vote of the AFL's constituent clubs.

After the loss to Adelaide, the Bears went on a seven-match winning streak, which included four victories in Melbourne. Among those victories was an 87-point defeat of Fitzroy at Optus Oval, in what was the final match played between the teams before their merger.

Entering the final round of the season, Brisbane were sitting first on the ladder with a chance to claim the minor premiership for the first (and only) time in the club's history, but were defeated by Collingwood at Victoria Park. Despite the loss, Brisbane's third-placed finish was its highest-ever, marking the only time the Bears finished in the top four and giving the club the chance to host finals matches at the Gabba.

In the qualifying final, Brisbane defeated Essendon by one point to record its first victory in a final. The following week in the semi-final, the Bears comfortably defeated Carlton by 97 points in front of a crowd of 21,767 people. Brisbane's final match was the preliminary final against North Melbourne at the Melbourne Cricket Ground, where the Bears lost by 38 points to fall one week short of making a maiden AFL Grand Final. The last goal for the Brisbane Bears was kicked by Darryl White in the final minutes of the preliminary final.

== AFL season ==
=== Lightning Premiership ===
Rd	Date and local time	Opponent	Scores (Brisbane's scores indicated in bold)			Venue	Crowd	Ladder
Rd	Date and local time	Opponent	Home	Away	Result	Venue	Crowd	Ladder
1	Friday, 9 February (9:30 pm)	Carlton	**6.4 (40)**	3.8 (26)	Won by 14 points	Waverley Park	—	—
QF	Saturday, 10 February (7:30 pm)	St Kilda	3.3 (21)	**6.7 (43)**	Won by 22 points	Waverley Park	—	—
SF	Sunday, 11 February (6:30 pm)	Collingwood	4.2 (26)	**7.13 (55)**	Won by 29 points	Waverley Park	—	—
GF	Sunday, 11 February (9:30 pm)	Essendon	**2.9 (21)**	6.2 (38)	Lost by 17 points	Waverley Park	—	—

=== Ansett Australia Cup ===
Rd	Date and local time	Opponent	Scores (Brisbane's scores indicated in bold)			Venue	Crowd	Ladder
Rd	Date and local time	Opponent	Home	Away	Result	Venue	Crowd	Ladder
1	Monday, 4 March (7:00 pm)	Geelong	**14.25 (109)**	9.9 (63)	Won by 46 points	The Gabba (H)	18,325	—
QF	Sunday, 10 March (7:00 pm)	North Melbourne	15.15 (105)	**13.12 (90)**	Lost by 15 points	The Gabba (A)	13,269	—

=== Home-and-away season ===
Rd	Date and local time	Opponent	Scores (Brisbane's scores indicated in bold)			Venue	Crowd	Ladder
Rd	Date and local time	Opponent	Home	Away	Result	Venue	Crowd	Ladder
1	Saturday, 30 March (7:40 pm)	Footscray	**21.15 (141)**	7.12 (54)	Won by 87 points	The Gabba (H)	14,222	3rd
2	Saturday, 6 April (6:40 pm)	West Coast	11.11 (77)	**16.7 (103)**	Won by 26 points	WACA (A)	29,213	3rd
3	Saturday, 13 April (7:40 pm)	Richmond	**13.12 (90)**	15.18 (108)	Lost by 18 points	The Gabba (H)	20,635	3rd
4	Friday, 19 April (7:40 pm)	North Melbourne	**18.17 (125)**	14.11 (95)	Won by 30 points	The Gabba (H)	17,469	3rd
5	Sunday, 28 April (2:10 pm)	Fitzroy	**24.14 (158)**	6.13 (49)	Won by 109 points	The Gabba (A)	14,495	1st
6	Sunday, 5 May (12:10 pm)	Fremantle	12.13 (85)	17.8 (110)	Won by 25 points	Subiaco Oval (A)	24,591	1st
7	Saturday, 11 May (7:40 pm)	Hawthorn	**15.14 (104)**	5.11 (41)	Won by 63 points	The Gabba (H)	20,053	1st
8	Friday, 17 May (7:40 pm)	Collingwood	**15.18 (108)**	14.14 (98)	Won by 10 points	The Gabba (H)	21,644	1st
9	Sunday, 26 May (1:10pm)	Sydney	21.6 (132)	**10.14 (74)**	Lost by 58 points	SCG (A)	26,537	2nd
10	Saturday, 8 June (2:10 pm)	Geelong	14.14 (98)	**15.8 (98)**	Draw	Kardinia Park (A)	24,800	3rd
11	Saturday, 15 June (7:40 pm)	Carlton	**5.8 (38)**	9.8 (62)	Lost by 24 points	The Gabba (H)	20,225	3rd
12	Saturday, 22 June (7:40 pm)	Melbourne	**18.15 (123)**	6.10 (46)	Won by 77 points	The Gabba (H)	14,871	3rd
13	Saturday, 29 June (2:10 pm)	St Kilda	14.12 (96)	**7.8 (50)**	Lost by 46 points	Waverley Park (A)	13,824	6th
14	Saturday, 6 July (8:10 pm)	Adelaide	15.12 (102)	**14.10 (94)**	Lost by 8 points	Football Park (A)	34,183	7th
15	Sunday, 14 July (2:10 pm)	Essendon	**15.13 (103)**	10.8 (68)	Won by 35 points	The Gabba (H)	20,378	5th
16	Saturday, 20 July (2:10 pm)	Footscray	3.4 (22)	**4.12 (36)**	Won by 14 points	Whitten Oval (A)	9,994	5th
17	Saturday, 27 July (2:10 pm)	West Coast	**25.13 (163)**	17.14 (116)	Won by 47 points	The Gabba (H)	15,772	5th
18	Sunday, 4 August (2:10 pm)	Richmond	7.11 (53)	**9.16 (70)**	Won by 17 points	Optus Oval (A)	17,157	5th
19	Sunday, 11 August (2:10 pm)	North Melbourne	8.11 (59)	**11.11 (77)**	Won by 18 points	Optus Oval (A)	15,453	3rd
20	Saturday, 17 August (2:10 pm)	Fitzroy	14.16 (100)	**29.13 (187)**	Won by 87 points	Optus Oval (H)	6,469	3rd
21	Saturday, 24 August (7:40 pm)	Fremantle	**10.11 (71)**	10.10 (70)	Won by 1 point	The Gabba (H)	19,204	1st
22	Saturday, 31 August (12:10 pm)	Collingwood	15.10 (100)	**6.15 (51)**	Lost by 49 points	Victoria Park (A)	21,126	3rd

=== Ladder ===
Pos	Team	Pld	W	L	D	PF	PA	PP	Pts	Qualification
1	Sydney	22	16	5	1	2152	1737	123.9	66	Finals series
2	North Melbourne (P)	22	16	6	0	2526	1982	127.4	64	Finals series
**3**	Brisbane Bears	**22**	**15**	**6**	**1**	**2174**	**1731**	**125.6**	62	Finals series
4	West Coast	22	15	7	0	2201	1758	125.2	60	Finals series
5	Carlton	22	15	7	0	2116	1909	110.8	60	Finals series
6	Essendon	22	14	7	1	2209	2023	109.2	58	Finals series
7	Geelong	22	13	8	1	2353	2047	114.9	54	Finals series
8	Hawthorn	22	11	10	1	1893	1921	98.5	46	Finals series
9	Richmond	22	11	11	0	2282	1944	117.4	44	
10	St Kilda	22	10	12	0	2053	2033	101.0	40	
11	Collingwood	22	9	13	0	2203	2142	102.8	36	
12	Adelaide	22	8	14	0	2233	2327	96.0	32	
13	Fremantle	22	7	15	0	1830	1983	92.3	28	
14	Melbourne	22	7	15	0	1743	2463	70.8	28	
15	Footscray	22	5	16	1	1654	2139	77.3	22	
16	Fitzroy	22	1	21	0	1452	2935	49.5	4	

Source: AFL Tables
Rules for classification: 1) points; 2) percentage; 3) number of points for.
(P) Premiers

=== Finals series ===
Rd	Date and local time	Opponent	Scores (Brisbane's scores indicated in bold)			Venue	Crowd
Rd	Date and local time	Opponent	Home	Away	Result	Venue	Crowd
Qualifying final	Friday, 6 September (7:45 pm)	Essendon	**15.11 (101)**	15.10 (100)	Won by 1 point	The Gabba (H)	21,964
Semi-final	Saturday, 14 September (7:45 pm)	Carlton	**26.14 (170)**	10.13 (73)	Won by 97 points	The Gabba (H)	21,767
Preliminary final	Saturday, 21 September (2:30 pm)	North Melbourne	17.12 (114)	**11.10 (76)**	Lost by 38 points	MCG (A)	66,719

== Awards and milestones ==
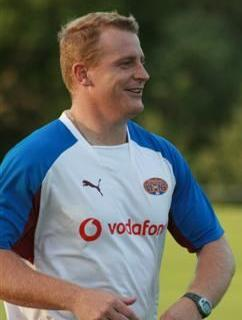
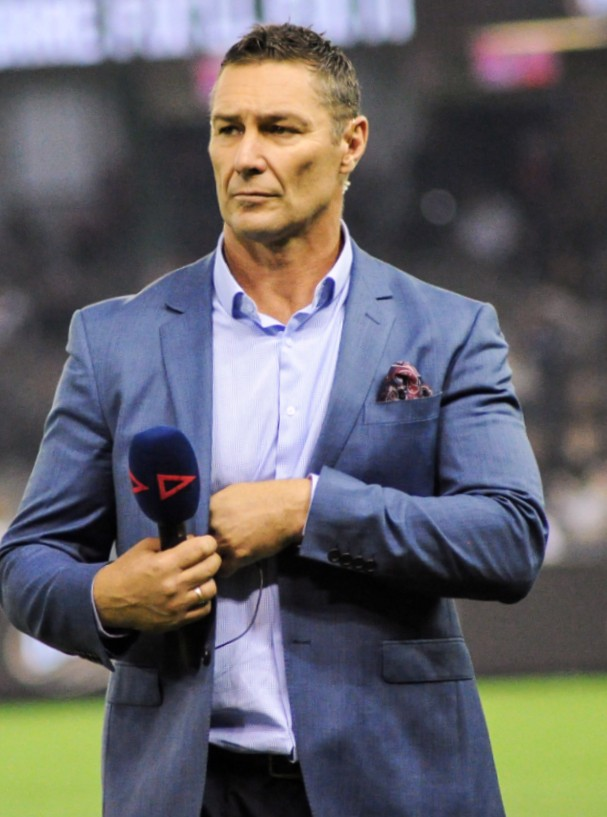
Michael Voss (left) and Alastair Lynch (right), the final winners of the Brisbane Bears' best-and-fairest and leading goalkicker awards respectively

Brisbane's Michael Voss won the Brownlow Medal as the AFL's best and fairest player during the 1996 season, finishing to 21 votes to tie with Essendon's James Hird. In doing so, Voss became the first Queenslander to win the Brownlow Medal. He was also named the Brisbane Bears Club Champion for the second year in a row. Voss and Craig Lambert were both named in the 1996 All-Australian team.

=== Club awards ===
- Club Champion (best and fairest): Michael Voss
- Leading goalkicker: Alastair Lynch (52 goals)

=== Milestones ===
Rd	Player	Milestone	Opponent	Venue	Ref
1	Troy Johnson	AFL debut	Footscray	The Gabba	
1	Danny Dickfos	AFL debut	Footscray	The Gabba	
2	Tristan Lynch	AFL debut	West Coast	WACA	
6	Richard Champion	100th AFL game	Fremantle	Subiaco Oval	
6	Clark Keating	AFL debut	Fremantle	Subiaco Oval	
11	Matthew Kennedy	100th AFL game	Carlton	The Gabba	
12	Ben Robbins	AFL debut	Melbourne	The Gabba	
18	Daniel Bradshaw	AFL debut	Richmond	Optus Oval	
QF	Shaun Hart	100th AFL game	Essendon	The Gabba	

== See also ==
- 1996 Fitzroy Football Club season
