= List of Brisbane Bears leading goalkickers =

Brisbane Bears leading goalkicker
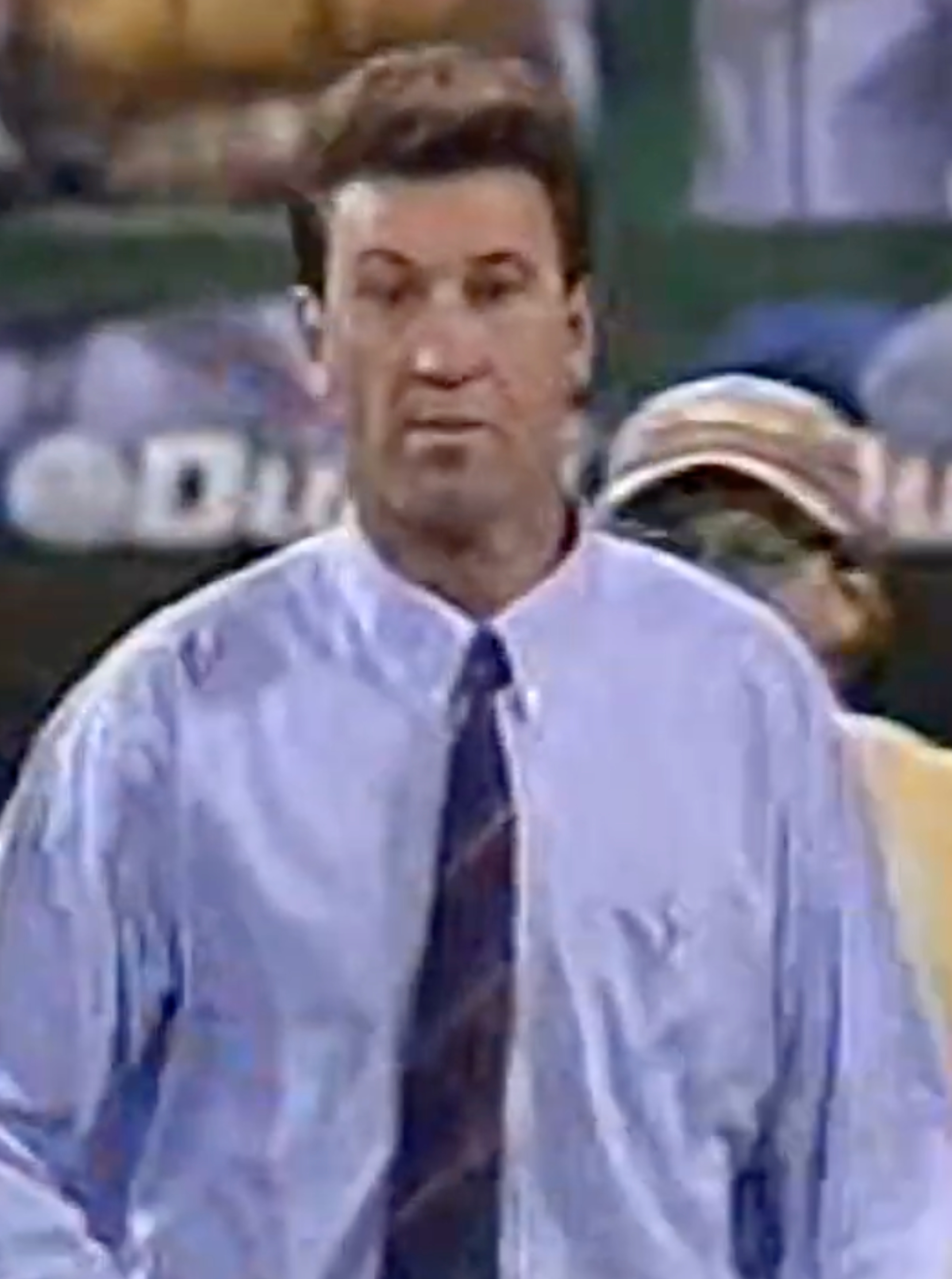
- Three-time leading goalkicker Roger Merrett
- Awarded for: Most goals for the Brisbane Bears during the season

History
- Most wins: Roger Merrett (3)

The following is a list of Brisbane Bears leading goalkickers in each of their seasons in the Australian Football League (AFL), which was known before 1990 as the Victorian Football League (VFL).

Roger Merrett was Brisbane's leading goalkicker three times and kicked a club record of 60 goals during the 1993 season. No Bears player ever won the Coleman Medal, which was awarded to the VFL/AFL player who kicks the most goals in the home-and-away season.

== List ==
Year	Leading goalkicker	Goals
1987	Jim Edmond	34
1988	Warwick Capper	45
1989	Brad Hardie	54
1990	Brad Hardie (2)	37
1991	Laurence Schache	47
1992	John Hutton	43
1993	Roger Merrett	60
1994	Roger Merrett (2)	41
1995	Roger Merrett (3)	44
1996	Alastair Lynch	52

== See also ==
- Brisbane Bears Club Champion
