= Craig Lambert =

Australian rules footballer

Personal information
- Born: 5 October 1968 (age 58); North Dandenong
- Original team: North Dandenong / Dandenong
- Height: 179 cm (5 ft 10 in)
- Weight: 84 kg (185 lb)

Club information
- Current club: GWS Giants (Development Coach)

Playing career^{1}
| Years | Club | Games (Goals) |
| 1988–1993 | Richmond | 123 (53) |
| 1994–1996 | Brisbane Bears | 49 (19) |
| 1997–2000 | Brisbane Lions | 47 (8) |
| Total | | 219 (80) |
- ^{1} Playing statistics correct to the end of 2000.

Career highlights
- Jack Dyer Medal 1991; Brisbane Bears Club Champion 1994; All-Australian 1996

Craig Lambert (born 5 October 1968) is a former Australian rules football player who played in the VFL/AFL between 1988 and 1993 for the Richmond Football Club and then from 1994 until 2000 for the Brisbane Bears then the Brisbane Lions Football Clubs. He was formerly employed by the Greater Western Sydney Giants as a development coach up until 2022. He now enjoys a rewarding life outside of football working in the Employee Engagement & Retention team at construction company BMD Group alongside his wife Melissa.

== Statistics ==
Legend
| G | Goals | K | Kicks | D | Disposals | T | Tackles |
| B | Behinds | H | Handballs | M | Marks |

| Season | Team | No. | Games | Totals | | | | | | | Averages (per game) | | | | | | | Votes |
| Season | Team | No. | Games | G | B | K | H | D | M | T | G | B | K | H | D | M | T | Votes |
|---|---|---|---|---|---|---|---|---|---|---|---|---|---|---|---|---|---|---|
| 1988 | Richmond | 53 | 21 | 4 | 11 | 204 | 222 | 426 | 35 | 46 | 0.2 | 0.5 | 9.7 | 10.6 | 20.3 | 1.7 | 2.2 | 10 |
| 1989 | Richmond | 4 | 20 | 7 | 12 | 247 | 226 | 473 | 49 | 40 | 0.4 | 0.6 | 12.4 | 11.3 | 23.7 | 2.5 | 2.0 | 4 |
| 1990 | Richmond | 4 | 19 | 4 | 11 | 208 | 205 | 413 | 37 | 32 | 0.2 | 0.6 | 10.9 | 10.8 | 21.7 | 1.9 | 1.7 | 6 |
| 1991 | Richmond | 4 | 22 | 18 | 10 | 262 | 320 | 582 | 75 | 50 | 0.8 | 0.5 | 11.9 | 14.5 | 26.5 | 3.4 | 2.3 | 4 |
| 1992 | Richmond | 4 | 21 | 15 | 13 | 236 | 256 | 492 | 38 | 39 | 0.7 | 0.6 | 11.2 | 12.2 | 23.4 | 1.8 | 1.9 | 4 |
| 1993 | Richmond | 4 | 20 | 5 | 5 | 203 | 259 | 462 | 33 | 43 | 0.3 | 0.3 | 10.2 | 13.0 | 23.1 | 1.7 | 2.2 | 2 |
| 1994 | Brisbane Bears | 18 | 19 | 7 | 5 | 179 | 279 | 458 | 21 | 59 | 0.4 | 0.3 | 9.4 | 14.7 | 24.1 | 1.1 | 3.1 | 9 |
| 1995 | Brisbane Bears | 18 | 10 | 2 | 3 | 99 | 150 | 249 | 19 | 27 | 0.2 | 0.3 | 9.9 | 15.0 | 24.9 | 1.9 | 2.7 | 0 |
| 1996 | Brisbane Bears | 18 | 20 | 10 | 8 | 228 | 295 | 523 | 39 | 62 | 0.5 | 0.4 | 11.4 | 14.8 | 26.2 | 2.0 | 3.1 | 9 |
| 1997 | Brisbane Lions | 18 | 16 | 5 | 7 | 166 | 229 | 395 | 25 | 50 | 0.3 | 0.4 | 10.4 | 14.3 | 24.7 | 1.6 | 3.1 | 3 |
| 1998 | Brisbane Lions | 18 | 5 | 0 | 2 | 29 | 32 | 61 | 9 | 7 | 0.0 | 0.4 | 5.8 | 6.4 | 12.2 | 1.8 | 1.4 | 0 |
| 1999 | Brisbane Lions | 18 | 14 | 2 | 4 | 80 | 148 | 228 | 13 | 22 | 0.1 | 0.3 | 5.7 | 10.6 | 16.3 | 0.9 | 1.6 | 1 |
| 2000 | Brisbane Lions | 18 | 12 | 1 | 3 | 69 | 98 | 167 | 12 | 17 | 0.1 | 0.3 | 5.8 | 8.2 | 13.9 | 1.0 | 1.4 | 0 |
| Career | | | 219 | 80 | 94 | 2210 | 2719 | 4929 | 405 | 494 | 0.4 | 0.4 | 10.1 | 12.4 | 22.5 | 1.8 | 2.3 | 52 |
