= Alastair Lynch =

Australian rules footballer, born 1968

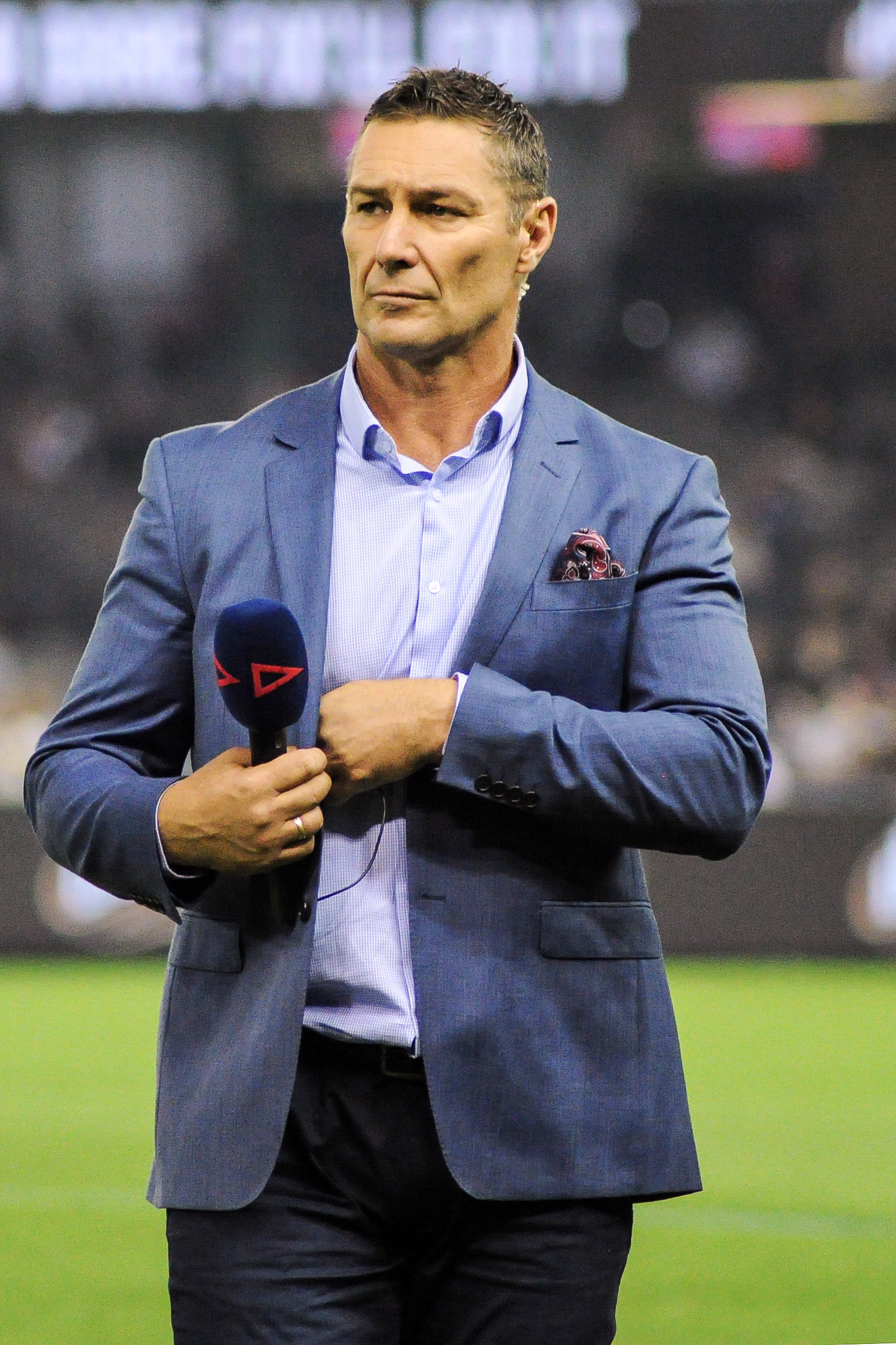
- Lynch in April 2018

Personal information
- Full name: Alastair Graeme Lynch
- Nickname: Lynchy
- Born: 19 June 1968 (age 58); Burnie, Tasmania
- Original team: Hobart (TFL)
- Draft: No. 50, 1986 national draft
- Height: 194 cm (6 ft 4 in)
- Weight: 97 kg (214 lb)
- Positions: Key Forward, Key Defender

Playing career^{1}
Years	Club	Games (Goals)
1988–1993	Fitzroy	120 (173)
1994–1996	Brisbane Bears	32 (89)
1997–2004	Brisbane Lions	154 (371)
Total		306 (633)

Representative team honours
Years	Team	Games (Goals)
1989–1993	Tasmania	4 (1)
- ^{1} Playing statistics correct to the end of 2004.

Career highlights
- 3× AFL Premierships: (2001, 2002, 2003); Brisbane Lions Captain: (1997–2000); Mitchell Medal: (1993); All-Australian Team: (1993); Fitzroy Leading Goalkicker: (1993); Brisbane Bears Leading Goalkicker: (1996); 4× Brisbane Lions Leading Goalkicker: (2000, 2001, 2002, 2003); Fitzroy Team of the Century; Tasmanian Team of the Century

Alastair Graeme Lynch (born 19 June 1968) is a former professional Australian rules footballer who played in the Australian Football League (AFL). He is best known as a three-time premiership full-forward for the Brisbane Lions.

The Tasmanian began his career in defence, but moved forward and became a leading goal-kicker for Fitzroy. He represented his home state at the elite level, and at the peak of his career in 1993 he was acknowledged as one of the league's best with All-Australian status. However, he left a financially struggling Fitzroy to join the Brisbane Bears after the club's move from the Gold Coast. With the merger of his former club Fitzroy and new club Brisbane, Lynch rejoined with former teammates and became club captain.

A long battle with chronic fatigue syndrome threatened his career; however, after many years in absence, Lynch's return to form at a relatively late age in his career was hailed by the football community, and he became part of Brisbane Lions' celebrated premiership winning formula.

Lynch holds the record for the most combined goals for the merged Brisbane-Fitzroy entity and one of the last remaining former Fitzroy players to play in the AFL.

With a passion for cricket, Lynch went on to represent Australia's Over 50's team in one match against England in 2018.

== Early life ==
Lynch was born in Burnie, north-west coastal Tasmania, the son of Graeme and Mollie Lynch, where he attended Burnie High School. He began playing football with Wynyard club where he played in the U17s and U19s before moving to Hobart. In Hobart he played senior football with the Hobart Football Club under coach Peter Hudson.

== VFL/AFL career ==
=== Fitzroy Lions career (1988–1993) ===
Selected at pick 50 in the 1986 VFL Draft, Lynch began his senior football career at Fitzroy in 1988. He signed his first contract on 5 February. He was an intimidating player in defence, playing full-back and centre half-back. In his early years, his notable abilities were his strong marking (his outstanding aerial abilities were recognised when he won the 1989 Mark of the Year award) and heavy tackling. His titanic battles with key forwards such as Tony Lockett were highlights, and Lockett has commented on Lynch being one of his toughest opponents. In 1993, Fitzroy coach Robert Shaw moved Lynch to full-forward, where he led the club's goal-kicking with 68 goals in addition to winning the best and fairest award. Lynch also played full-back in the 1990 Tasmanian State of Origin team, the first Tasmanian team to defeat Victoria in 30 years.

=== Brisbane Bears career (1994–1996) ===
In 1994, Lynch transferred to the Brisbane Bears. At the time, the Brisbane Bears, like the Fitzroy Football Club, were experiencing lean times, but they were improving somewhat under the coaching of premiership coach Robert Walls. The term of Lynch's contract, ten years, was unprecedented; at the time, it was considered by outsiders to be a great risk for the club.

Lynch came full of promise to the Bears. In the early years, he became a poster-boy recruit for the struggling club, which lacked big name players.

In his first few games of the 1994 AFL season, Lynch had suffered a broken collarbone and knee surgery, making him unable deliver his best. In 1995, he contracted a mystery virus (which was later revealed that he was suffering from chronic fatigue syndrome), which sidelined him for the entire 1995 season. Some commentators believe that if Lynch had played that season, the Bears could have won a premiership. Others believed that Lynch contracted chronic fatigue when over-training during his rehabilitation from injury. Lynch was one of the first sportspeople in Australia to experiment with the ice bath, which proved to assist in his recovery, and became a public figure for the illness which was struggling for credibility at the time. After the illness Lynch rarely travelled to Perth, to play the Western Australian teams at home.

In his return the following season, the Bears, struggling for forward-line talent and with an increasingly talented back-line, first experimented playing Lynch up forward to relieve an ageing Roger Merrett with some success. Successive seasons saw him interchanged between the two opposite ends of the ground.

=== Brisbane Lions career (1997–2004) ===
When Fitzroy merged with the Bears after the 1996 season to form the Brisbane Lions, Lynch was made a semi-permanent forward but was unable to perform at his peak for the next two seasons due to minor recurrence of his illness.

Lynch was appointed as club co-captain with Michael Voss in 1997, a position that he held until 2000, when Voss assumed the full captaincy.

Still struggling with intermittent lapses of Chronic Fatigue Syndrome in 1998, Lynch discovered that the drug he had been prescribed at the beginning of the season, although with the permission of the Australian Sports Drug Agency (official AFL drug agents), had been added to the International Olympic Committee list of banned substances. He took it upon himself to alert the AFL and was controversially charged for taking a prohibited substance before eventually being cleared.

A new beginning for Lynch and the Lions came in 1999 under champion coach Leigh Matthews. He played some games in defence but usually at full-forward. Improvements in his strength, kicking for goal, and positioning during marking contests made him one of the most feared forwards in the competition.

The Brisbane Lions enjoyed great success for the 2001, 2002, and 2003 seasons, with Lynch becoming a multiple goal-kicker against the game's most prominent full-backs, including Stephen Silvagni, Matthew Scarlett, and Shane Wakelin from Collingwood, Brisbane's ongoing rivals. In this period, Lynch played in three successive premierships. Lynch was in possession of the ball when the final siren sounded at the 2001 Grand Final to signify the club's first Premiership in 57 years. He would go on to play a key role in two further Grand Final triumphs. In 2004, he was the competition's oldest player at 36 years of age, and became the last remaining player born in the 1960s to play in the VFL/AFL.

Lynch announced his retirement after Brisbane's loss in the 2004 AFL Grand Final. It was viewed by some as a disappointing end to his career; he injured his quad early in the game, his only statistic for the day was giving away a free kick which led to Port Adelaide's first goal for the match, and he would have missed the first ten matches of 2005 after being reported a record-equalling seven times for exchanging punches in an all-out fight with Port Adelaide's Darryl Wakelin, for which Lynch was also fined $15,000. Lynch has since admitted significant regret about his behaviour in the match.

== Statistics ==
Legend
G	Goals	K	Kicks	D	Disposals	T	Tackles
B	Behinds	H	Handballs	M	Marks

Season	Team	No.	Games	Totals							Averages (per game)							Votes
Season	Team	No.	Games	G	B	K	H	D	M	T	G	B	K	H	D	M	T	Votes
1988	Fitzroy	11	18	24	16	117	42	159	64	10	1.3	0.9	6.5	2.3	8.8	3.6	0.6	0
1989	Fitzroy	11	18	26	12	138	40	178	79	9	1.4	0.7	7.7	2.2	9.9	4.4	0.5	1
1990	Fitzroy	11	22	19	34	217	57	274	120	17	0.9	1.5	9.9	2.6	12.5	5.5	0.8	0
1991	Fitzroy	11	22	9	14	215	75	290	88	28	0.4	0.6	9.8	3.4	13.2	4.0	1.3	4
1992	Fitzroy	11	20	27	13	159	63	222	74	15	1.4	0.7	8.0	3.2	11.1	3.7	0.8	2
1993	Fitzroy	11	20	68	31	260	68	328	143	12	3.4	1.6	13.0	3.4	16.4	7.2	0.6	10
1994	Brisbane Bears	11	13	35	22	146	32	178	81	6	2.7	1.7	11.2	2.5	13.7	6.2	0.5	7
1995	Brisbane Bears	11	1	2	0	6	5	11	5	1	2.0	0.0	6.0	5.0	11.0	5.0	1.0	0
1996	Brisbane Bears	11	18	52	34	153	32	185	87	7	2.9	1.9	8.5	1.8	10.3	4.8	0.4	2
1997	Brisbane Lions	11	20	12	7	155	62	217	89	10	0.6	0.4	7.8	3.1	10.9	4.5	0.5	0
1998	Brisbane Lions	11	15	10	7	109	63	172	55	10	0.7	0.5	7.3	4.2	11.5	3.7	0.7	0
1999	Brisbane Lions	11	17	31	20	99	27	126	63	8	1.8	1.2	5.8	1.6	7.4	3.7	0.5	0
2000	Brisbane Lions	11	22	68	25	184	49	233	124	17	3.1	1.1	8.4	2.2	10.6	5.6	0.8	3
2001†	Brisbane Lions	11	23	58	34	154	59	213	93	18	2.5	1.5	6.7	2.6	9.3	4.0	0.8	3
2002†	Brisbane Lions	11	22	74	30	161	42	203	102	14	3.4	1.4	7.3	1.9	9.2	4.6	0.6	4
2003†	Brisbane Lions	11	22	78	36	161	44	205	101	15	3.5	1.6	7.3	2.0	9.3	4.6	0.7	5
2004	Brisbane Lions	11	13	40	22	78	18	96	54	2	3.1	1.7	6.0	1.4	7.4	4.2	0.2	2
Career			306	633	357	2512	778	3290	1422	199	2.1	1.2	8.2	2.5	10.8	4.6	0.7	43

== Post-VFL/AFL career ==
Following his retirement from playing football, Lynch has commentated for Fox Footy and also been a panelist on Bounce with Jason Dunstall, Danny Frawley and Andrew Gaze. He also co-wrote a book with Peter Blucher titled Taking Nothing For Granted, which was released in 2005.

== Career highlights ==
- Mark of the Year 1989
- All Australian 1993
- Fitzroy Best and Fairest 1993
- Fitzroy Leading Goalkicker 1993
- Brisbane Bears Leading Goalkicker 1996
- Brisbane Lions Premiership player 2001, 2002, 2003
- Brisbane Lions Leading Goalkicker 2000, 2001, 2002, 2003
