= Adam McCarthy =

Australian rules footballer

Personal information
- Full name: Adam McCarthy
- Born: 14 February 1972 (age 54)
- Original team: Scoresby
- Height: 185 cm (6 ft 1 in)
- Weight: 81 kg (179 lb)

Playing career^{1}
Years	Club	Games (Goals)
1992–1994	North Melbourne	15 (3)
1995–1996	Fitzroy	15 (9)
Total		30 (12)
- ^{1} Playing statistics correct to the end of 1996.

Adam McCarthy (born 14 February 1972) is a former Australian rules footballer who played with North Melbourne and Fitzroy in the Australian Football League (AFL).

McCarthy, a midfielder from Scoresby, won a best and fairest award at the North Melbourne Under-19s. He made eight senior appearances in 1992, didn't feature at all in 1993, then played seven games in 1994. At the end of the 1994 season, McCarthy was traded to Fitzroy, in exchange for Matthew Armstrong. He played 13 games for Fitzroy in 1995 but made just two more appearances in 1996, Fitzroy's final season in the AFL.
