= Phil Walsh (Australian footballer) =

Australian rules footballer and coach

- Walsh in June 2015

Personal information
- Full name: Phillip Walsh
- Born: 15 March 1960; Hamilton, Victoria, Australia
- Died: 3 July 2015 (aged 55); Somerton Park, South Australia, Australia
- Original team: Hamilton
- Height: 180 cm (5 ft 11 in)
- Weight: 80 kg (176 lb)

Playing career
Years	Club	Games (Goals)
1983	Collingwood	22 (9)
1984–1986	Richmond	40 (14)
1987–1990	Brisbane Bears	60 (18)
Total		122 (41)

Coaching career
Years	Club	Games (W–L–D)
2001	Port Adelaide	1 (1–0–0)
2015	Adelaide	12 (7–5–0)

Career highlights
- Brisbane Bears Club Champion: 1987; AFL Coaches Association Assistant Coach of the Year award: 2004

Phillip Walsh (15 March 1960 – 3 July 2015) was an Australian rules footballer and coach. Walsh played for Collingwood, Richmond and the Brisbane Bears in the Victorian Football League (VFL) between 1983 and 1990. Upon ending his playing career, Walsh held assistant coaching roles at Geelong, West Coast and Port Adelaide before being appointed as the senior coach of the Adelaide Football Club for a three-season contract beginning in 2015.

On 3 July 2015, Walsh was found dead at the age of 55 in his Somerton Park home with multiple stab wounds. His son Cy was charged with his murder, and he was later found not guilty due to mental incompetence.

== Playing career ==
Walsh played mostly as a wingman and made his VFL debut in the 1983 season with Collingwood. The following year he crossed to Richmond, where he spent three seasons with the club, playing in 40 games. He finished his career with the Brisbane Bears and won their inaugural best and fairest award in 1987.

== Coaching career ==
After his playing career, Walsh became the fitness co-ordinator and senior team runner at the Geelong Football Club from 1996 to 1999, before moving to the Port Adelaide Football Club as an assistant coach in 1999. He was an assistant coach under Mark Williams in Port's 2004 premiership team. In the same year, he was awarded the AFL Coaches Association Assistant Coach of the Year award. He coached the team in the absence of Williams (whose father Fos had died) for one game in Round 22, 2001.

In 2009, Walsh moved to West Coast as an assistant coach under John Worsfold.

In 2014, he returned to South Australia as an assistant coach, specialising in midfield strategy, at the Port Adelaide Football Club.

On 7 October 2014, Walsh was appointed the senior coach at the Adelaide Football Club for three years after the sacking of Brenton Sanderson.

After his death on 6 July 2015, Walsh was replaced by assistant coach Scott Camporeale as caretaker senior coach of Adelaide Football Club for the rest of the 2015 season.

== Death ==
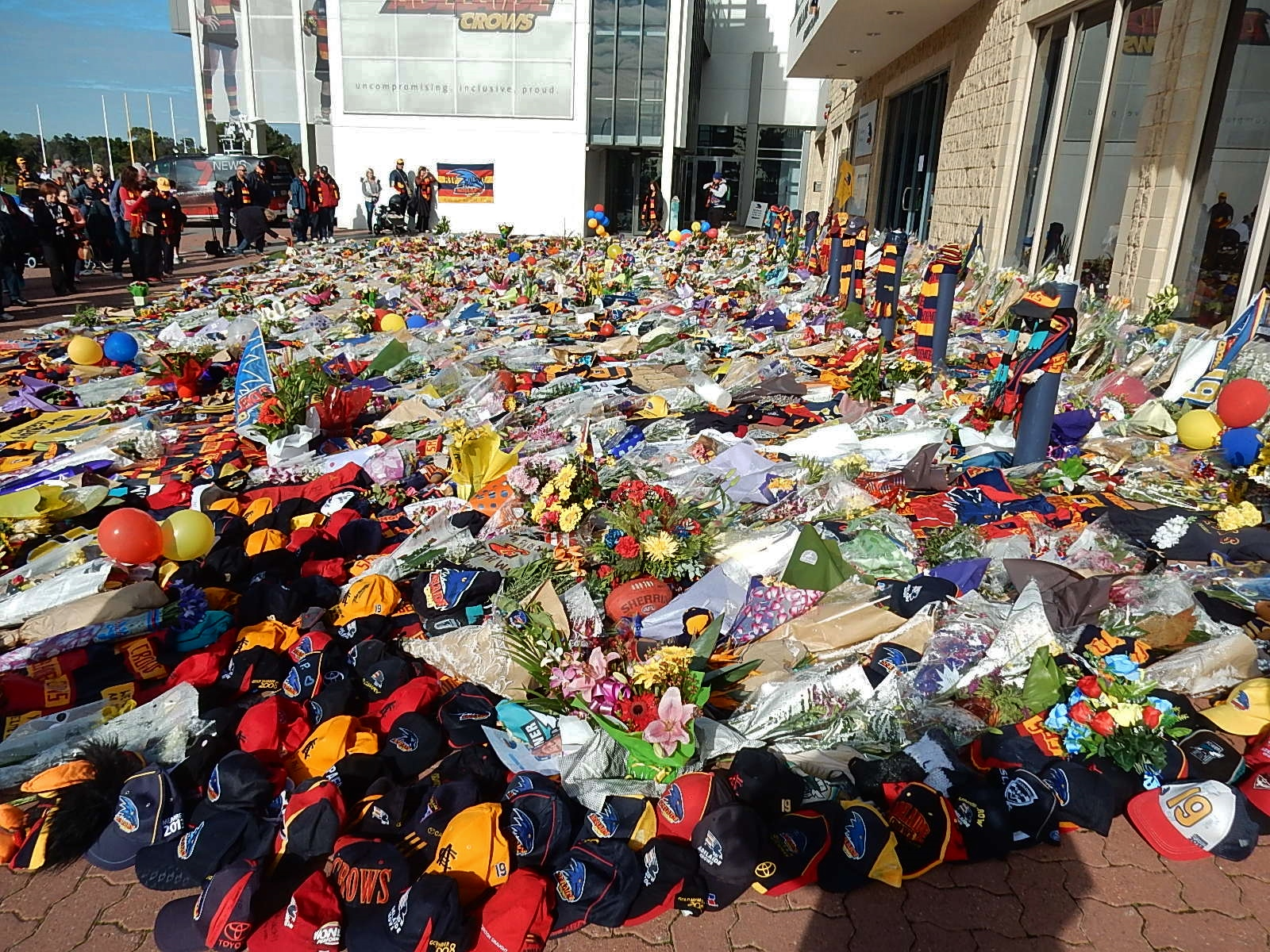
Fans leave tributes to Walsh at the Adelaide Football Club's headquarters.

On 3 July 2015, Walsh was found dead in his Somerton Park home. Police were called to the house just after 2:00 am, and found Walsh with multiple stab wounds. Paramedics arrived and tried to revive him, but a doctor confirmed him dead at the scene. Walsh's wife Meredith was taken to a nearby hospital for cuts to her leg. Their 26-year-old son Cy, who lived at the same home, was found by police a short time later at First Ave, Glenelg East, taken into custody and charged with murder. The Crows' next scheduled match, against Geelong, on 5 July 2015, was cancelled with both teams awarded two premiership points, making it the only game cancelled outright in the league's history.

In late September 2016, Cy Walsh was found not guilty of murder due to mental incompetence. The judge accepted psychological evidence that he was suffering from undiagnosed and untreated schizophrenia at the time of the incident, and toxicological evidence did not indicate drug intoxication. He is subject to a lifetime psychiatric supervision order. In September 2021, he was granted unsupervised leave from the mental health facility where he is detained, Ashton House, for activities such as shopping.

== Personal life ==
Walsh grew up in Hamilton, Victoria, and was the youngest of 7 children. In addition to football, Walsh also enjoyed cricket, tennis and basketball. Walsh lost his mother in 2009 and father, a World War II veteran, in 2011. Walsh could speak Japanese, and he was regarded one of the greatest minds in modern football. Walsh was extremely devoted to his role as coach of Adelaide, often waking between 2am and 5am to begin his job.
