= Brisbane Bears Club Champion =

Award given to Brisbane Bears players

The Brisbane Bears Club Champion was an award given to the Brisbane Bears player determined to have been the "best and fairest" throughout an AFL season, from 1987 to 1996.

== Recipients ==
+	Player won Brownlow Medal in same season

Season	Recipient(s)	Ref.
1987	Phil Walsh	
1988	Mark Withers	
1989	John Gastev	
1990	David Bain	
1990	Martin Leslie	
1991	Michael McLean	
1992	John Gastev (2)	
1993	Michael McLean (2)	
1994	Craig Lambert	
1995	Michael Voss	
1996	Michael Voss+ (2)	

== Multiple winners ==
Player	Medals	Seasons
John Gastev	2	1989, 1992
Michael McLean	2	1991, 1993
Michael Voss	2	1995, 1996
