= Michael McLean (footballer) =

Australian rules footballer (born 1965)

Personal information
- Full name: Michael McLean
- Nicknames: Magic, Madge
- Born: 3 March 1965 (age 61); Darwin, Northern Territory
- Original team: Nightcliff (NTFL)
- Height: 180 cm (5 ft 11 in)
- Weight: 84 kg (185 lb)

Playing career^{1}
Years	Club	Games (Goals)
1983–1989	Footscray	95 (23)
1991–1996	Brisbane Bears	87 (17)
1997	Brisbane Lions	1 (0)
Total		183 (40)

Representative team honours
Years	Team	Games (Goals)
1988	Northern Territory	3
1993	QLD/NT	

Coaching career^{3}
Years	Club	Games (W–L–D)
2003–2007	Indigenous All-Stars	(2–1–0)
- ^{1} Playing statistics correct to the end of 1997.^{3} Coaching statistics correct as of 2007.

Career highlights
- 2× Brisbane Bears Club Champion: 1991, 1993

Michael "Magic" McLean (born 3 March 1965) is a former professional Australian rules footballer who played for the Footscray Football Club, Brisbane Bears and Brisbane Lions in the Australian Football League (AFL).

== Early life ==
McLean was born in Darwin, Northern Territory to parents from Queensland. His mother is of Indigenous Australian descent (Wuthathi) from the Cape York Peninsula in Far North Queensland and his caucasian father is from Townsville. McLean grew up playing Australian rules football for the Nightcliff Tigers and rugby league for the Nightcliff Dragons in the local Darwin junior leagues as well as pursuing an amateur boxing career in which he amassed an undefeated 11-0 record.

As an eight year old, he scored 51 tries in a single season of junior rugby league and was later invited to trial with the Balmain Tigers in the New South Wales Rugby League. Despite being encouraged by his father to pursue a career in rugby league, he committed to Australian rules football and signed to play for the Footscray Bulldogs in the Victorian Football League at 16 years of age.

== VFL/AFL career ==
=== Footscray career ===
McLean moved to Victoria and debuted for Footscray in 1983. He became known as a skilful winger who went on to play 95 games and boot 23 goals with the Bulldogs before he suffered an ankle and calf injuries that hampered his career. In response to his injuries, McLean focused on building his lean body to become one of the strongest bodies in the competition.

=== Brisbane career ===
The Bulldogs gave McLean the boot, before he was picked up in the 1991 pre-season draft as the first overall pick for the Brisbane Bears. In his first year with the Bears, he flew between Darwin and the Gold Coast due to his preference of living in the NT that year before moving to the Gold Coast in his second year to play and train full-time with the Bears. McLean resurrected his AFL career in Queensland, winning the 1991 and 1993 best and fairest award at the Bears. He went on to play 87 games and kick 17 goals with the Bears and played in the first game with the newly merged Brisbane Lions in 1997 before constant calf injury struck him down, forcing his retirement at 32 years of age.

== Coaching career ==
McLean returned to Darwin to coach his former club Nightcliff, he did so for five years with limited success before resigning at the end of 2004 to coach the Redland Football Club in the Queensland State League. At the end of the 2005, as Redland seemed destined for the wooden spoon, he resigned and returned to Darwin to again coach Nightcliff. In the 2005–06 season, McLean gave the Tigers an impressive season and reached the preliminary final before bowing out to eventual premiers, the Darwin Football Club. In the 2006–07 season, McLean became coach for the Southern Districts Football Club and won the premiership in his first year as coach with the club. In 2009, he became the head coach of the Northern Territory Football Club and coached their inaugural season in the Queensland Australian Football League (QAFL). In May 2016, he was announced as the new senior coach of the Waratah Football Club heading into the 2016–17 NTFL season.

== Aboriginal activist ==
During his career and after, McLean has been a strong anti-racism advocate. He was a vital part of the Aboriginal All-Stars match up in Darwin, and was also named in the Indigenous Team of the Century.

In 2007, McLean was working at Palmerston YMCA in Darwin as a community worker.
