= Mark Withers (footballer) =

Australian rules footballer

Personal information
- Born: 3 March 1964 (age 62)
- Original team: North Launceston (NTFA)
- Height: 175 cm (5 ft 9 in)
- Weight: 73 kg (161 lb)

Playing career^{1}
Years	Club	Games (Goals)
1984–1986	Melbourne	32 (28)
1987–1990	Brisbane Bears	36 (29)
Total		68 (57)
- ^{1} Playing statistics correct to the end of 1990.

Career highlights
- Brisbane Bears Club Champion: 1988

Mark Withers (born 3 March 1964) is a former Australian rules footballer who played for Melbourne and the Brisbane Bears in the Victorian Football League (VFL) during the 1980s.

Originally from Northern Tasmanian Football Association (NTFA) club North Launceston, Withers was recruited by Melbourne and made his senior VFL debut in 1984 before joining Brisbane for their inaugural season. He won the Bears' best and fairest in 1988 and was their top disposal-getter that year.
