= Jason Ramsey =

Australian rules footballer

Personal information
- Full name: Jason Ramsey
- Born: 24 January 1975 (age 51)
- Original teams: Port Adelaide, (SANFL)
- Draft: Fitzroy: No. 4, 1995 Pre-season Draft Richmond: No. 22, 1997 Rookie Draft

Playing career^{1}
Years	Club	Games (Goals)
1996	Fitzroy	2 (0)
- ^{1} Playing statistics correct to the end of 1996.

Jason Ramsey (born 24 January 1975) is a former Australian rules footballer who played for Fitzroy in the Australian Football League (AFL) in 1996. He was recruited from the Port Adelaide Football Club (SANFL) in the South Australian National Football League (SANFL) with the 4th selection in the 1995 Pre-season Draft.

When Fitzroy's AFL operations were taken over by the Brisbane Bears to form the Brisbane Lions at the end of the 1996 AFL season, Ramsey was not one of the eight players selected by Brisbane to join the new Brisbane Lions and he instead entered the 1996 AFL drafts, where he was selected by Richmond with the 22nd selection of the 1997 Rookie Draft. Despite being elevated to Richmond's senior list in 1997, he did not play a senior game for Richmond. He missed the entire 1998 season due to a dislocated shoulder and was delisted at the end of the 1999 season.
