= John Gastev =

Australian rules footballer (born 1964)

Personal information
- Full name: John Gastev
- Born: 11 August 1964 (age 62)
- Original team: West Perth
- Draft: No. 2, 1989 pre-season draft
- Height: 177 cm (5 ft 10 in)
- Weight: 76 kg (168 lb)
- Positions: Midfielder, half-back

Playing career^{1}
Years	Club	Games (Goals)
1983–1988	West Perth	61 (81)
1987–1988	West Coast	30 (31)
1989–1994	Brisbane Bears	113 (41)
Total		204 (153)

Representative team honours^{2}
Years	Team	Games (Goals)
1990–1993	Western Australia	2 (1)

International team honours^{2}
1990	Australia	3 (?)
- ^{1} Playing statistics correct to the end of 1994.^{2} Representative statistics correct as of 1990.

Career highlights
- 2× Brisbane Bears Club Champion: 1989, 1992

John Gastev (born John Gastevich; 11 August 1964) is a former Australian rules footballer who played in the Australian Football League (AFL).

A cult figure and "crowd favourite" standing at only 177 centimetres (5 ft 10 in) and weighing just 73 kilograms (161 lb), Gastev began with West Perth in 1983. However, Gastev's career did not take off until 1985 when he gave up a career as an engraver to concentrate upon football full-time and became a mainstay for the Falcons before debuting with the West Coast Eagles in their inaugural season in the Victorian Football League (VFL). After only two seasons and 30 games, Gastev was dumped and joined the Brisbane Bears for 1989. Gastev's main roles were as a tagger, though he occasionally played as a forward in his early years. In an upset win over the Sydney Swans early in 1989, Gastev kicked seven goals after half-time, a feat made more remarkable by the fact that he kicked no other goal in the first thirteen rounds of 1989. In this first year at the Bears he won the best and fairest, repeating the feat in 1992.

After 1990, Gastev played chiefly in defence, and his career was ended when he suffered a major hit at the hands of Gary Ablett in a match in 1994 at Kardinia Park. Gastev announced his retirement during the off-season, despite being only thirty years old.

His other honours include playing for Western Australia in state of origin.
