= Mick Dwyer =

Australian rules footballer

Personal information
- Full name: Mark Dwyer
- Born: 16 November 1968 (age 57)
- Original team: Lyndale
- Height: 179 cm (5 ft 10 in)
- Weight: 82 kg (181 lb)

Playing career^{1}
Years	Club	Games (Goals)
1986–1995	St Kilda	80 (61)
1996	Fitzroy	8 (3)
Total		88 (64)
- ^{1} Playing statistics correct to the end of 1996.

Mark "Mick" Dwyer (born 16 November 1968) is a former Australian rules footballer who played with St Kilda and Fitzroy in the Victorian/Australian Football League (VFL/AFL).

Dwyer made his VFL debut in 1986 at the age of 17, after arriving at the club from Lyndale. A centreman and utility, Dwyer had an injury plagued career but did manage to play all 22 games in the 1989 VFL season. He had 456 disposals for the year which was just three behind club leader Peter Russo.

In 1992 he spent most of the season in the reserves but forced his way into the team late in the year and participated in St Kilda's finals campaign. For his efforts in the seconds he took home the Gardiner Medal.

Although he only put together nine games in 1993, Dwyer earned eight votes at the Brownlow Medal count to finish as St Kilda's second best performer behind future winner Robert Harvey. He played just six further games over the next two seasons due to a knee injury and in the 1995 AFL draft was traded to Fitzroy for pick 36, which was used on Andrew Lamb.

Dwyer married Liza Benton in 2000. They have four children(Kyla, Mason, Lainey, and Samara), a dog, and two cats (who he hates with a passion).
