= Robert McMahon (footballer) =

Australian rules footballer

Personal information
- Full name: Robert McMahon
- Born: 28 July 1977 (age 49)
- Original teams: Gippsland U18s, (TAC Cup), Moe Lions Football Club
- Draft: Fitzroy: No. 6, 1994 AFL draft Hawthorn: No. 51, 1996 AFL draft

Playing career^{1}
Years	Club	Games (Goals)
1996	Fitzroy	2 (1)
- ^{1} Playing statistics correct to the end of 1996.

Robert McMahon (born 28 July 1977) is a former Australian rules footballer who played for Fitzroy in the Australian Football League (AFL) in 1996. He was recruited from the Gippsland Power in the TAC Cup with the 6th selection in the 1994 AFL draft. When Fitzroy's AFL operations were taken over by the Brisbane Bears at the end of the 1996 AFL season, McMahon was not one of the eight players selected by Brisbane and he instead entered the 1996 AFL draft, where he was selected by Hawthorn with the 51st selection. Despite playing well for the Hawthorn reserves side, he was never selected to play another AFL game.
