= Stephen Paxman =

Australian rules footballer, born 1970

Personal information
- Full name: Stephen Paxman
- Born: 4 December 1970 (age 55)
- Original team: East Doncaster
- Height: 188 cm (6 ft 2 in)
- Weight: 94 kg (207 lb)

Playing career^{1}
Years	Club	Games (Goals)
1991–1996	Fitzroy	102 (18)
1997–2003	Port Adelaide	138 (20)
Total		240 (38)
- ^{1} Playing statistics correct to the end of 2003.

Career highlights
- John Cahill Medal: 1999

Stephen Paxman (born 4 December 1970) is a former professional Australian rules footballer who played for the Fitzroy Football Club and the Port Adelaide Football Club in the Australian Football League (AFL).

== AFL career ==
=== Fitzroy career (1991–1996) ===
Paxman began his career with the Fitzroy Football Club in 1991, he went on to play 102 games for the club before Fitzroy's AFL operations were taken over by the Brisbane Bears to form the Brisbane Lions.

=== Port Adelaide career (1997–2003) ===
Not wanting to join the Brisbane Lions, Paxman ended up being picked up in the 1997 pre-season draft the newly joined team in the AFL, the Port Adelaide Power.

He won the 1999 John Cahill Medal. He retired at the end of the 2003 season after playing every game of the season.

Paxman kicked 38 goals during his career despite playing primarily as a full back. In season 2000, Paxman kicked 6 goals in the last 13 games while mostly playing at full back.
