= Frank Bizzotto =

Australian rules footballer

Personal information
- Full name: Frank Bizzotto
- Born: 30 May 1971 (age 55)
- Original team: West Preston
- Height: 178 cm (5 ft 10 in)
- Weight: 80 kg (176 lb)

Playing career^{1}
Years	Club	Games (Goals)
1991–1996	Fitzroy	38 (4)
- ^{1} Playing statistics correct to the end of 1996.

Frank Bizzotto (born 30 May 1971) is a former Australian rules footballer who played with Fitzroy in the Australian Football League (AFL).

Bizzotto, recruited from West Preston, played 38 games for Fitzroy from 1991 to 1996, 18 of them in 1995. He had stints at West Preston, Kilcunda Bass, Caulfield and St Kilda City, before retiring in 2002.
