= 1996 AFL Lightning Premiership =

- Season: 1996
- Teams: 16
- Winners: Essendon (2nd title)
- Runner up: Brisbane Bears
- Matches played: 15
- Attendance: 24,276 (average 1,618 per match)

The 1996 AFL Lightning Premiership was an Australian rules football knock-out competition, played in its entirety before the Australian Football League's main pre-season competition began. The Lightning Premiership was held for the only time in the modern era in 1996 - the Centenary Season of the AFL. It was a knock-out competition played from Friday, 9 February until Sunday, 11 February, with four games each evening at Waverley Park, each consisting of two 17.5-minute halves. The game trialled a number of highly experimental rules, including three points awarded both for deliberate rushed behinds and balls which hit the goalposts, and timekeepers not blowing the siren if scores were tied. However, the rule which altered play most significantly was the ball not being thrown in from the boundary line after travelling out of bounds, a free kick being awarded instead against the last team to touch the ball. Essendon won the title defeating Brisbane by 17 points in the Grand Final.

== Rules ==
- Each game consisted of two 17-minute halves, with a five-minute half-time break
- In the case of a tie after normal time, the siren would not sound until another score had been registered
- Four boundary and four goal umpires were used
- Three points were awarded if the ball hit the post, signalled by a different coloured flag
- Three points were awarded for a deliberately rushed behind
- The last player to touch the ball before it went over the boundary line was penalised and a free kick awarded to the opposing team. When it could not be determined who touched the ball last, it was thrown back in
- The defender kicking in after a score did not have to wait until the goal umpire finished waving his flags
- No umpire would bounce the ball, instead it was thrown up on all occasions
- Six-man interchange bench

== Matches ==
=== Round 1 ===
Match	Home team	Home team score	Away team	Away team score	Ground	Date	Time
1.	North Melbourne	3.5 (23)	Melbourne	3.4 (22)	Waverley Park	Friday, 9 February	6:30pm
2.	Fitzroy	2.5 (17)	Collingwood	6.4 (40)	Waverley Park	Friday, 9 February	7:30pm
3.	St Kilda	7.8 (50)	Hawthorn	3.2 (20)	Waverley Park	Friday, 9 February	8:30pm
4.	Brisbane	6.4 (40)	Carlton	3.8 (26)	Waverley Park	Friday, 9 February	9:30pm
5.	West Coast	4.8 (32)	Richmond	6.1 (37)	Waverley Park	Saturday, 10 February	11:00am
6.	Adelaide	6.6 (42)	Fremantle	8.7 (55)	Waverley Park	Saturday, 10 February	12:00pm
7.	Geelong	6.7 (43)	Essendon	10.7 (67)	Waverley Park	Saturday, 10 February	1:00pm
8.	Sydney	6.6 (42)	Footscray	6.4 (40)	Waverley Park	Saturday, 10 February	2:00pm

=== Quarter-finals ===
Match	Home team	Home team score	Away team	Away team score	Ground	Date	Time
9.	North Melbourne	5.6 (36)	Collingwood	6.7 (43)	Waverley Park	Saturday, 10 February	6:30pm
10.	St Kilda	3.3 (21)	Brisbane	6.7 (43)	Waverley Park	Saturday, 10 February	7:30pm
11.	Richmond	5.1 (31)	Fremantle	8.13 (61)	Waverley Park	Saturday, 10 February	8:30pm
12.	Essendon	7.13 (55)	Sydney	3.10 (28)	Waverley Park	Saturday, 10 February	9:30pm

=== Semi-finals ===
Match	Home team	Home team score	Away team	Away team score	Ground	Date	Time
13.	Collingwood	4.2 (26)	Brisbane	7.13 (55)	Waverley Park	Sunday, 11 February	6:30pm
14.	Fremantle	5.8 (38)	Essendon	6.11 (47)	Waverley Park	Sunday, 11 February	7:30pm

== Grand final ==
Match	Home team	Home team score	Away team	Away team score	Ground	Date	Time
15.	Brisbane	2.9 (21)	Essendon	6.2 (38)	Waverley Park	Sunday, 11 February	9:30pm

== Results ==
Round One
North Melbourne	23
Melbourne	22
Fitzroy	17
Collingwood	40
St Kilda	50
Hawthorn	20
Brisbane Bears	40
Carlton	26
West Coast	32
Richmond	37
Adelaide	42
Fremantle	55
Geelong	43
Essendon	67
Sydney	42
Western Bulldogs	40

Quarter-finals
North Melbourne	36
Collingwood	43
St Kilda	21
Brisbane Bears	43
Richmond	31
Fremantle	61
Essendon	55
Sydney	28

Semi-finals
Collingwood	26
Brisbane Bears	55
Fremantle	38
Essendon	47

Grand Final
Brisbane Bears	21
Essendon	38

== See also ==
- List of VFL/AFL pre-season and night series premiers
- 1996 Ansett Australia Cup
- 1996 AFL season
