= 1991 AFL season =

95th season of the Australian Football League (AFL)

1991 AFL premiership season
- Teams: 15
- Premiers: Hawthorn; 9th premiership
- Minor premiers: West Coast; 1st minor premiership
- Pre-season cup: Hawthorn; 2nd pre-season cup win
- Brownlow Medallist: Jim Stynes (Melbourne)
- Coleman Medallist: Tony Lockett (St Kilda)

Attendance
- Matches played: 172
- Total attendance: 4,178,884 (24,296 per match)
- Highest: 75,230 (Grand Final, Hawthorn vs. West Coast)

The 1991 AFL season was the 95th season of the Australian Football League (AFL), which was known previously as the Victorian Football League until 1989. The season ran from 22 March until 28 September, and comprised a 22-game home-and-away season followed by a finals series featuring the top six clubs, an increase from the top five clubs which had contested the finals since 1972.

The season saw expansion of the league to fifteen clubs, with the admission of the newly established Adelaide Crows, based in Adelaide, South Australia. With at least one team representing each of the three major Australian rules football states, the league was now the highest level senior Australian rules football competition across Australia, as well as the top administrative body for football in Victoria.

The premiership was won by the Hawthorn Football Club for the ninth time, after defeating West Coast by 53 points in the 1991 AFL Grand Final.

== Foster's Cup ==
Hawthorn defeated North Melbourne 14.19 (103) to 7.12 (54) in the final.

== Home-and-away season ==
The league expanded to 15 teams with the admission of the Adelaide Crows, meaning byes were required for the first time since 1943.

Each team played 22 games for the season with two byes: seven teams had a bye in round 1, and one team had a bye in each subsequent round.

=== Round 1 ===
	Round 1
Friday, 22 March (7:40 pm)	Adelaide 24.11 (155)	def.	Hawthorn 9.15 (69)	Football Park (crowd: 44,902)	Report
Saturday, 23 March (2:10 pm)	St Kilda 16.11 (107)	def.	Richmond 12.10 (82)	Waverley Park (crowd: 33,192)	Report
Sunday, 24 March (2:10 pm)	Footscray 11.10 (76)	def. by	Collingwood 21.20 (146)	Waverley Park (crowd: 38,861)	Report
Sunday, 24 March (2:10 pm)	West Coast 14.15 (99)	def.	Melbourne 2.8 (20)	Subiaco Oval (crowd: 26,105)	Report
	Bye; Brisbane Bears, Carlton, Essendon, Fitzroy, Geelong, North Melbourne, Sydney
The Jarman brothers Andrew (for Adelaide) and Darren (for Hawthorn) made their AFL debuts against each other in the season opener.

=== Round 2 ===
Home team	Home team score	Away team	Away team score	Ground	Crowd	Date
Collingwood	8.10 (58)	West Coast	13.7 (85)	Waverley Park	39,266	Saturday 30, March
Fitzroy	6.13 (49)	Melbourne	27.18 (180)	Princes Park	11,278	Saturday 30, March
Brisbane Bears	8.10 (58)	North Melbourne	15.14 (104)	Carrara Stadium	5,724	Saturday 30, March
Adelaide	12.9 (81)	Carlton	15.14 (104)	Football Park	43,850	Sunday 31, March
Richmond	17.7 (109)	Essendon	16.17 (113)	MCG	31,793	Monday 1, April
Geelong	18.22 (130)	St Kilda	16.8 (104)	Kardinia Park	26,303	Monday 1, April
Hawthorn	25.16 (166)	Sydney	10.15 (75)	Princes Park	13,815	Monday 1, April

=== Round 3 ===
Home team	Home team score	Away team	Away team score	Ground	Crowd	Date
Carlton	18.19 (127)	Brisbane Bears	9.16 (70)	Princes Park	16,651	Saturday 6, April
Collingwood	16.21 (117)	Fitzroy	8.10 (58)	Victoria Park	24,691	Saturday 6, April
North Melbourne	13.16 (94)	Essendon	25.17 (167)	MCG	24,961	Saturday 6, April
Hawthorn	20.16 (136)	Richmond	11.13 (79)	Waverley Park	25,960	Saturday 6, April
Footscray	10.8 (68)	Geelong	15.27 (117)	Whitten Oval	20,875	Sunday 7, April
Melbourne	21.19 (145)	St Kilda	24.10 (154)	MCG	27,266	Sunday 7, April
Sydney	15.18 (108)	Adelaide	19.18 (132)	SCG	10,649	Sunday 7, April

=== Round 4 ===
	Round 4
Friday, 12 April (7:40 pm)	West Coast 18.19 (127)	def.	North Melbourne 8.7 (55)	WACA Ground (crowd: 28,362)	Report
Saturday, 13 April (2:10 pm)	Essendon 12.20 (92)	def.	Adelaide 6.11 (47)	Windy Hill (crowd: 20,197)	Report
Saturday, 13 April (2:10 pm)	Melbourne 23.17 (155)	def.	Carlton 17.8 (110)	Waverley Park (crowd: 32,573)	Report
Saturday, 13 April (2:10 pm)	St Kilda 13.16 (94)	drew with	Collingwood 13.16 (94)	Moorabbin Oval (crowd: 31,213)	Report
Saturday, 13 April (2:10 pm)	Fitzroy 12.18 (90)	def. by	Footscray 15.16 (106)	Princes Park (crowd: 10,351)	Report
Saturday, 13 April (2:10 pm)	Richmond 19.13 (127)	def. by	Sydney 24.20 (164)	MCG (crowd: 17,294)	Report
Sunday, 14 April (2:10 pm)	Brisbane Bears 12.16 (88)	def. by	Geelong 27.28 (190)	The Gabba (crowd: 12,654)	Report
	Bye; Hawthorn
This was the first time since 1981 that a match for VFL/AFL premiership points had been staged at The Gabba. Under the insistence of their new coach Robert Walls, the Bears would eventually relocate there permanently in 1993. The match is also noticeable with Geelong’s Bill Brownless kicking 11 goals in the match, which remains the record for most goals kicked in a match at the venue.

=== Round 5 ===
Home team	Home team score	Away team	Away team score	Ground	Crowd	Date
Sydney	19.16 (130)	Essendon	24.17 (161)	SCG	13,140	Friday 19, April
Collingwood	16.19 (115)	Brisbane Bears	14.9 (93)	Victoria Park	20,403	Saturday 20, April
Fitzroy	12.17 (89)	Richmond	16.17 (113)	Princes Park	12,124	Saturday 20, April
Footscray	17.16 (118)	Hawthorn	16.11 (107)	Waverley Park	21,448	Saturday 20, April
Melbourne	28.14 (182)	North Melbourne	17.10 (112)	MCG	22,928	Saturday 20, April
Geelong	13.17 (95)	Carlton	8.10 (58)	Kardinia Park	27,365	Sunday 21, April
West Coast	19.16 (130)	Adelaide	9.11 (65)	Subiaco Oval	34,704	Sunday 21, April

=== Round 6 ===
Home team	Home team score	Away team	Away team score	Ground	Crowd	Date
Collingwood	10.17 (77)	Melbourne	17.11 (113)	Waverley Park	55,735	Thursday 25, April
North Melbourne	27.26 (188)	Sydney	21.8 (134)	MCG	15,664	Thursday 25, April
Carlton	13.16 (94)	St Kilda	7.18 (60)	Princes Park	29,005	Saturday 27, April
Geelong	13.11 (89)	West Coast	19.20 (134)	Waverley Park	33,905	Saturday 27, April
Brisbane Bears	12.11 (83)	Essendon	16.18 (114)	Carrara Stadium	9,253	Saturday 27, April
Fitzroy	11.8 (74)	Hawthorn	36.15 (231)	North Hobart Oval	13,335	Sunday 28, April
Adelaide	19.14 (128)	Footscray	14.13 (97)	Football Park	36,695	Sunday 28, April

=== Round 7 ===
	Round 7
Friday, 3 May (7:40 pm)	North Melbourne 21.15 (141)	def.	Fitzroy 14.13 (97)	MCG (crowd: 13,111)	Report
Saturday, 4 May (2:10 pm)	St Kilda 24.18 (162)	def.	Adelaide 4.7 (31)	Moorabbin Oval (crowd: 25,057)	Report
Saturday, 4 May (2:10 pm)	Melbourne 18.18 (126)	def.	Brisbane Bears 17.11 (113)	MCG (crowd: 14,722)	Report
Saturday, 4 May (2:10 pm)	Essendon 17.13 (115)	def.	Carlton 13.16 (94)	Waverley Park (crowd: 47,651)	Report
Saturday, 4 May (2:10 pm)	Hawthorn 8.14 (62)	def. by	West Coast 21.18 (144)	Princes Park (crowd: 18,585)	Report
Sunday, 5 May (2:10 pm)	Footscray 20.13 (133)	def.	Richmond 14.17 (101)	Western Oval (crowd: 18,644)	Report
Sunday, 5 May (2:10 pm)	Sydney 20.24 (144)	def.	Geelong 14.14 (98)	SCG (crowd: 11,244)	Report
	Bye; Collingwood
St Kilda stars Nicky Winmar and Tony Lockett marked their long-awaited return to action with outstanding performances as the Saints set a new club record for biggest win, eclipsing their 110-point win against Fitzroy in 1970. The signs were ominous when Lockett goaled in the opening minute after marking a pass from Robert Harvey, eventually finishing with 12 goals. The Crows weren't helped by the loss of Andrew Jarman to a shoulder injury in the first quarter.; In their match at the MCG, Brisbane Bears led Melbourne for much of the afternoon, and appeared to have won when former Geelong player Shane Hamilton put the Bears 19 points ahead at the 19-minute mark of the final quarter. The Demons mounted a comeback when Darren Cuthbertson goaled from a controversial free kick after Bears defender John Gastev was penalized for holding the ball, and hit the front with goals to Jim Stynes and Ricky Jackson to eventually run out 13-point winners. Cuthbertson and Darren Bennett kicked five goals each for the winners.

=== Round 8 ===
Home team	Home team score	Away team	Away team score	Ground	Crowd	Date
Hawthorn	18.14 (122)	Carlton	11.12 (78)	Waverley Park	29,727	Saturday 11, May
Essendon	13.9 (87)	West Coast	14.10 (94)	Windy Hill	21,438	Saturday 11, May
Fitzroy	10.10 (70)	Sydney	21.21 (147)	Princes Park	7,416	Saturday 11, May
Melbourne	17.19 (121)	Footscray	12.10 (82)	MCG	23,617	Saturday 11, May
Geelong	17.17 (119)	North Melbourne	22.18 (150)	Kardinia Park	17,746	Saturday 11, May
Richmond	24.15 (159)	Collingwood	15.12 (102)	MCG	28,322	Sunday 12, May
Brisbane Bears	12.7 (79)	St Kilda	21.22 (148)	Gabba	9,828	Sunday 12, May

=== Round 9 ===
Home team	Home team score	Away team	Away team score	Ground	Crowd	Date
North Melbourne	18.12 (120)	Adelaide	18.10 (118)	MCG	16,175	Friday 17, May
Carlton	13.15 (93)	Richmond	12.9 (81)	Princes Park	23,087	Saturday 18, May
Collingwood	13.12 (90)	Geelong	18.24 (132)	Victoria Park	26,262	Saturday 18, May
Hawthorn	15.13 (103)	Essendon	13.9 (87)	Waverley Park	40,537	Saturday 18, May
Footscray	15.11 (101)	Brisbane Bears	14.12 (96)	Whitten Oval	10,585	Saturday 18, May
West Coast	17.23 (125)	Fitzroy	3.8 (26)	Subiaco Oval	23,586	Sunday 19, May
Sydney	16.17 (113)	St Kilda	18.11 (119)	SCG	13,284	Sunday 19, May

=== Round 10 ===
Home team	Home team score	Away team	Away team score	Ground	Crowd	Date
Adelaide	15.16 (106)	Melbourne	10.12 (72)	Football Park	43,722	Friday 24, May
Collingwood	16.12 (108)	Hawthorn	23.13 (151)	Waverley Park	45,595	Saturday 25, May
St Kilda	11.15 (81)	Essendon	16.13 (109)	Moorabbin Oval	33,832	Saturday 25, May
Fitzroy	19.13 (127)	Geelong	14.22 (106)	Princes Park	10,214	Saturday 25, May
North Melbourne	21.15 (141)	Footscray	18.19 (127)	MCG	17,254	Saturday 25, May
Brisbane Bears	10.15 (75)	Richmond	12.10 (82)	Carrara Stadium	7,330	Sunday 26, May
West Coast	15.16 (106)	Sydney	10.12 (72)	Subiaco Oval	33,498	Sunday 26, May

=== Round 11 ===
Home team	Home team score	Away team	Away team score	Ground	Crowd	Date
North Melbourne	18.22 (130)	Collingwood	17.12 (114)	MCG	28,299	Saturday 1, June
Essendon	12.14 (86)	Melbourne	12.8 (80)	Windy Hill	21,635	Saturday 1, June
Geelong	27.15 (177)	Adelaide	14.9 (93)	Kardinia Park	17,644	Saturday 1, June
Hawthorn	10.17 (77)	St Kilda	15.13 (103)	Princes Park	20,832	Saturday 1, June
Richmond	12.8 (80)	West Coast	17.15 (117)	Waverley Park	15,476	Saturday 1, June
Footscray	8.9 (57)	Carlton	1.10 (16)	Whitten Oval	16,036	Sunday 2, June
Sydney	18.13 (121)	Brisbane Bears	26.12 (168)	SCG	7,657	Sunday 2, June

=== Round 12 ===
Home team	Home team score	Away team	Away team score	Ground	Crowd	Date
Carlton	12.10 (82)	Collingwood	10.2 (62)	Waverley Park	39,832	Saturday 8, June
Footscray	4.11 (35)	Sydney	5.5 (35)	Whitten Oval	11,236	Saturday 8, June
Brisbane Bears	14.9 (93)	West Coast	21.19 (145)	Carrara Stadium	5,728	Sunday 9, June
Adelaide	7.8 (50)	Fitzroy	7.5 (47)	Football Park	31,273	Sunday 9, June
Hawthorn	13.18 (96)	Geelong	20.16 (136)	Princes Park	23,123	Monday 10, June
Melbourne	13.12 (90)	Richmond	14.12 (96)	MCG	29,415	Monday 10, June
St Kilda	15.11 (101)	North Melbourne	8.18 (66)	Moorabbin Oval	31,242	Monday 10, June

=== Round 13 ===
	Round 13
Friday, 14 June (7:40 pm)	West Coast 25.15 (165)	def.	Footscray 7.5 (47)	WACA Ground (crowd: 25,117)	Report
Saturday, 15 June (2:10 pm)	Richmond 6.11 (47)	def. by	Adelaide 12.13 (85)	MCG (crowd: 16,235)	Report
Saturday, 15 June (2:10 pm)	Hawthorn 22.17 (149)	def.	Brisbane Bears 9.8 (62)	Princes Park (crowd: 5,741)	Report
Saturday, 15 June (2:10 pm)	Essendon 10.14 (74)	def. by	Collingwood 11.10 (76)	Waverley Park (crowd: 41,948)	Report
Sunday, 16 June (1:10 pm)	Fitzroy 15.8 (98)	def. by	St Kilda 17.9 (111)	North Hobart Oval (crowd: 13,746)	Report
Sunday, 16 June (2:10 pm)	Melbourne 16.8 (104)	def. by	Geelong 20.14 (134)	MCG (crowd: 40,930)	Report
Sunday, 16 June (3:10 pm)	Sydney 18.16 (124)	def.	Carlton 17.8 (110)	SCG (crowd: 12,769)	Report
	Bye; North Melbourne
In the Friday evening game in Perth, West Coast continued their unbeaten start to the season and extended their winning streak to 12 games when they pounded Footscray by 118 points, equalling their biggest winning margin which was set against Brisbane Bears in 1988. Full-forward Peter Sumich became the first Eagles player to kick ten or more goals in a game and finished with a career-best 13 goals.; Going into three-quarter time with a one-point lead, Adelaide kicked six goals to none in the final quarter to defeat Richmond and win their first game in Melbourne. After the match, Crows coach Graham Cornes acknowledged the significance of the win and took the opportunity to accuse the Victorian football media of a "xenophobic" attitude towards non-Victorian teams, also claiming that South Australian football crowds were "angels" compared to the crowds at Melbourne's suburban football grounds.; The game between Melbourne and Geelong marked the much-anticipated return of Gary Ablett from his premature retirement announcement earlier in the year. He had a modest game with ten touches and two goals, while teammate Bill Brownless took several spectacular marks and kicked seven goals as the Cats ran out winners by 30 points and consigned the Demons to a fourth straight loss.

=== Round 14 ===
Home team	Home team score	Away team	Away team score	Ground	Crowd	Date
Richmond	19.14 (128)	North Melbourne	26.16 (172)	MCG	23,353	Friday 21, June
Carlton	12.11 (83)	West Coast	11.14 (80)	Princes Park	19,588	Saturday 22, June
Collingwood	20.23 (143)	Sydney	6.8 (44)	Victoria Park	22,332	Saturday 22, June
Essendon	17.20 (122)	Fitzroy	12.11 (83)	Windy Hill	16,519	Saturday 22, June
St Kilda	16.6 (102)	Footscray	8.21 (69)	Moorabbin Oval	23,963	Saturday 22, June
Melbourne	11.11 (77)	Hawthorn	19.13 (127)	Waverley Park	30,664	Saturday 22, June
Adelaide	23.18 (156)	Brisbane Bears	13.12 (90)	Football Park	35,355	Sunday 23, June

=== Round 15 ===
Home team	Home team score	Away team	Away team score	Ground	Crowd	Date
North Melbourne	18.7 (115)	Hawthorn	27.17 (179)	MCG	25,819	Friday 28, June
Collingwood	23.22 (160)	Adelaide	5.7 (37)	Victoria Park	25,164	Saturday 29, June
Fitzroy	6.5 (41)	Carlton	8.12 (60)	Princes Park	15,147	Saturday 29, June
Footscray	11.23 (89)	Essendon	6.7 (43)	Whitten Oval	17,536	Saturday 29, June
Geelong	19.17 (131)	Richmond	14.14 (98)	Waverley Park	22,688	Saturday 29, June
Sydney	14.10 (94)	Melbourne	26.21 (177)	SCG	10,569	Sunday 30, June
West Coast	21.11 (137)	St Kilda	14.9 (93)	Subiaco	42,255	Sunday 30, June

=== Round 16 ===
Home team	Home team score	Away team	Away team score	Ground	Crowd	Date
Carlton	14.5 (89)	North Melbourne	13.17 (95)	Princes Park	23,191	Saturday 6, July
Collingwood	20.13 (133)	Footscray	13.2 (80)	Victoria Park	27,757	Saturday 6, July
Hawthorn	23.20 (158)	Adelaide	14.11 (95)	Waverley Park	21,715	Saturday 6, July
Melbourne	11.10 (76)	West Coast	14.16 (100)	MCG	25,799	Saturday 6, July
Geelong	13.21 (99)	Essendon	10.15 (75)	Kardinia Park	31,096	Sunday 7, July
Brisbane Bears	26.14 (170)	Fitzroy	15.15 (105)	Gabba	7,373	Sunday 7, July
Richmond	13.18 (96)	St Kilda	18.16 (124)	MCG	32,782	Sunday 7, July

=== Round 17 ===
Home team	Home team score	Away team	Away team score	Ground	Crowd	Date
West Coast	20.15 (135)	Collingwood	8.6 (54)	WACA	30,715	Friday 12, July
Carlton	6.12 (48)	Adelaide	7.13 (55)	Princes Park	13,509	Saturday 13, July
Essendon	6.7 (43)	Richmond	7.18 (60)	Windy Hill	13,501	Saturday 13, July
Melbourne	12.20 (92)	Fitzroy	7.13 (55)	MCG	12,710	Saturday 13, July
St Kilda	9.13 (67)	Geelong	18.8 (116)	Moorabbin Oval	28,789	Saturday 13, July
North Melbourne	15.13 (103)	Brisbane Bears	14.6 (90)	Waverley Park	7,239	Saturday 13, July
Sydney	14.19 (103)	Hawthorn	15.24 (114)	SCG	12,143	Sunday 14, July

=== Round 18 ===
Home team	Home team score	Away team	Away team score	Ground	Crowd	Date
Fitzroy	15.21 (111)	Collingwood	18.16 (124)	Princes Park	14,129	Saturday 20, July
Essendon	19.9 (123)	North Melbourne	5.19 (49)	Windy Hill	19,322	Saturday 20, July
Richmond	13.10 (88)	Hawthorn	13.16 (94)	Waverley Park	24,731	Saturday 20, July
St Kilda	16.14 (110)	Melbourne	17.9 (111)	Moorabbin Oval	24,950	Saturday 20, July
Brisbane Bears	14.16 (100)	Carlton	12.21 (93)	Carrara Stadium	9,735	Sunday 21, July
Geelong	20.16 (136)	Footscray	10.8 (68)	Kardinia Park	22,145	Sunday 21, July
Adelaide	16.22 (118)	Sydney	19.8 (122)	Football Park	40,794	Sunday 21, July

=== Round 19 ===
	Round 19
Friday, 26 July (7:40 pm)	North Melbourne 12.13 (85)	def.	West Coast 11.16 (82)	MCG (crowd: 19,399)	Report
Saturday, 27 July (2:10 pm)	Geelong 24.15 (159)	def.	Brisbane Bears 8.10 (58)	Kardinia Park (crowd: 13,639)	Report
Saturday, 27 July (2:10 pm)	Carlton 10.8 (68)	def. by	Melbourne 11.14 (80)	Princes Park (crowd: 16,110)	Report
Saturday, 27 July (2:10 pm)	Collingwood 13.7 (85)	def.	St Kilda 7.11 (53)	Waverley Park (crowd: 53,315)	Report
Saturday, 27 July (2:10 pm)	Footscray 16.12 (108)	def.	Fitzroy 7.9 (51)	Western Oval (crowd: 8,977)	Report
Sunday, 28 July (2:10 pm)	Sydney 14.15 (99)	def.	Richmond 12.20 (92)	SCG (crowd: 9,276)	Report
Sunday, 28 July (7:40 pm)	Adelaide 16.12 (108)	def.	Essendon 12.9 (81)	Football Park (crowd: 41,716)	Report
	Bye; Hawthorn

=== Round 20 ===
	Round 20
Saturday, 3 August (2:10 pm)	Carlton 16.9 (105)	def.	Geelong 14.19 (103)	Princes Park (crowd: 20,277)	Report
Saturday, 3 August (2:10 pm)	Essendon 22.19 (151)	def.	Sydney 12.12 (84)	Windy Hill (crowd: 14,341)	Report
Saturday, 3 August (2:10 pm)	Hawthorn 12.11 (83)	def.	Footscray 10.9 (69)	Waverley Park (crowd: 20,670)	Report
Saturday, 3 August (2:10 pm)	North Melbourne 13.10 (88)	def. by	Melbourne 20.20 (140)	MCG (crowd: 28,323)	Report
Saturday, 3 August (7:40 pm)	Brisbane Bears 10.11 (71)	def. by	Collingwood 26.16 (172)	Carrara Stadium (crowd: 9,302)	Report
Sunday, 4 August (2:10 pm)	Richmond 13.19 (97)	def. by	Fitzroy 23.18 (156)	MCG (crowd: 16,434)	Report
Sunday, 4 August (2:10 pm)	Adelaide 11.14 (80)	def. by	West Coast 14.11 (95)	Football Park (crowd: 45,864)	Report
	Bye; St Kilda
Carlton produced its second major upset of the season, shaking off four consecutive narrow losses and surviving a last-quarter fightback from second-placed Geelong to win by two points. The Blues players kept a promise to coach David Parkin that they would produce a four-quarter effort, while Cats coach Malcolm Blight lamented his side's inconsistency.

=== Round 21 ===
Home team	Home team score	Away team	Away team score	Ground	Crowd	Date
West Coast	11.16 (82)	Geelong	12.9 (81)	WACA	30,987	Friday 9, August
St Kilda	23.17 (155)	Carlton	15.11 (101)	Waverley Park	32,615	Saturday 10, August
Melbourne	8.7 (55)	Collingwood	19.13 (127)	MCG	50,085	Saturday 10, August
Essendon	23.19 (157)	Brisbane Bears	17.10 (112)	Windy Hill	12,970	Saturday 10, August
Hawthorn	28.27 (195)	Fitzroy	10.9 (69)	Princes Park	11,500	Saturday 10, August
Footscray	8.16 (64)	Adelaide	6.4 (40)	Whitten Oval	11,452	Saturday 10, August
Sydney	13.22 (100)	North Melbourne	20.16 (136)	SCG	13,252	Sunday 11, August

=== Round 22 ===
Home team	Home team score	Away team	Away team score	Ground	Crowd	Date
Adelaide	12.9 (81)	St Kilda	20.12 (132)	Football Park	45,440	Friday 16, August
Carlton	12.12 (84)	Essendon	13.10 (88)	Waverley Park	34,588	Saturday 17, August
Fitzroy	22.16 (148)	North Melbourne	21.21 (147)	Princes Park	8,588	Saturday 17, August
Richmond	14.11 (95)	Footscray	11.12 (78)	MCG	15,466	Saturday 17, August
Geelong	17.13 (115)	Sydney	13.10 (88)	Kardinia Park	17,755	Saturday 17, August
Brisbane Bears	13.13 (91)	Melbourne	15.13 (103)	Gabba	6,480	Sunday 18, August
West Coast	15.9 (99)	Hawthorn	11.9 (75)	Subiaco Oval	35,001	Sunday 18, August

=== Round 23 ===
Home team	Home team score	Away team	Away team score	Ground	Crowd	Date
Sydney	21.14 (140)	Fitzroy	13.16 (94)	SCG	8,553	Friday 23, August
Carlton	8.10 (58)	Hawthorn	23.18 (156)	Princes Park	18,521	Saturday 24, August
Collingwood	18.18 (126)	Richmond	14.9 (93)	Victoria Park	29,541	Saturday 24, August
North Melbourne	8.10 (58)	Geelong	13.12 (90)	Waverley Park	26,445	Saturday 24, August
St Kilda	27.12 (174)	Brisbane Bears	7.12 (54)	Moorabbin Oval	16,364	Saturday 24, August
West Coast	16.19 (115)	Essendon	7.10 (52)	Subiaco Oval	38,990	Sunday 25, August
Footscray	6.9 (45)	Melbourne	8.8 (56)	Whitten Oval	16,380	Sunday 25, August

=== Round 24 ===
Home team	Home team score	Away team	Away team score	Ground	Crowd	Date
Richmond	20.18 (138)	Carlton	18.15 (123)	MCG	21,854	Saturday 31, August
Geelong	16.11 (107)	Collingwood	8.18 (66)	Kardinia Park	28,491	Saturday 31, August
Essendon	9.9 (63)	Hawthorn	21.17 (143)	Waverley Park	48,311	Saturday 31, August
Fitzroy	14.15 (99)	West Coast	12.17 (89)	Princes Park	7,308	Saturday 31, August
St Kilda	24.14 (158)	Sydney	17.17 (119)	Moorabbin Oval	24,106	Saturday 31, August
Brisbane Bears	8.14 (62)	Footscray	14.14 (98)	Carrara Stadium	4,721	Saturday 31, August
Adelaide	28.12 (180)	North Melbourne	16.11 (107)	Football Park	36,220	Sunday 1, September

== Ladder ==
(P)	Premiers
	Qualified for finals

#	Team	P	W	L	D	PF	PA	%	Pts
1	West Coast	22	19	3	0	2485	1532	162.2	76
2	Hawthorn (P)	22	16	6	0	2793	2055	135.9	64
3	Geelong	22	16	6	0	2660	2021	131.6	64
4	St Kilda	22	14	7	1	2512	2087	120.4	58
5	Melbourne	22	13	9	0	2355	2123	110.9	52
6	Essendon	22	13	9	0	2203	2017	109.2	52
7	Collingwood	22	12	9	1	2349	2033	115.5	50
8	North Melbourne	22	12	10	0	2456	2693	91.2	48
9	Adelaide	22	10	12	0	2041	2282	89.4	40
10	Footscray	22	9	12	1	1815	2064	87.9	38
11	Carlton	22	8	14	0	1878	2113	88.9	32
12	Sydney	22	7	14	1	2360	2778	85.0	30
13	Richmond	22	7	15	0	2141	2450	87.4	28
14	Fitzroy	22	4	18	0	1837	2771	66.3	16
15	Brisbane Bears	22	3	19	0	1976	2842	69.5	12

Rules for classification: 1. premiership points; 2. percentage; 3. points for
Average score: 102.6
Source: AFL Tables

== Finals series ==
=== Finals week 1 ===
Home team	Home team score	Away team	Away team score	Ground	Crowd	Date
Melbourne	17.11 (113)	Essendon	11.9 (75)	Waverley Park	46,032	Saturday 7, September
Geelong	15.14 (104)	St Kilda	14.13 (97)	Waverley Park	63,796	Sunday 8, September
West Coast	15.11 (101)	Hawthorn	18.16 (124)	Subiaco Oval	44,142	Sunday 8, September

=== Finals week 2 ===
Home team	Home team score	Away team	Away team score	Ground	Crowd	Date
Hawthorn	13.17 (95)	Geelong	13.15 (93)	Waverley Park	63,733	Saturday 14, September
West Coast	17.15 (117)	Melbourne	12.7 (79)	Waverley Park	41,136	Sunday 15, September

=== Preliminary final ===
Home team	Home team score	Away team	Away team score	Ground	Crowd	Date
Geelong	8.16 (64)	West Coast	11.13 (79)	Waverley Park	47,638	Saturday 21, September

=== Grand final ===
Home team	Home team score	Away team	Away team score	Ground	Crowd	Date
Hawthorn	20.19 (139)	West Coast	13.8 (86)	Waverley Park	75,230	Saturday 28, September

== Season notes ==
- The Adelaide Football Club, nicknamed the Crows, entered the AFL competition.
- The McIntyre "final five" system, which had operated from 1972 until 1990, was replaced by the first McIntyre "final six" system. This system lasted only this season, and it was replaced by the second McIntyre "final six" system in 1992.
- St Kilda broke an eighteen year finals drought, making the finals for the first time since 1973.
- In round 6, North Melbourne and Sydney kicked a combined 32.18 (210) in the first half. It is the only aggregate of 200 points for a half in VFL/AFL history.
- In round 11, Carlton kicked its only goal through Mark Arceri 33 seconds from the end of its match with Footscray. It was the Blues' lowest score since 1904, and the closest a team has come to a goalless match since 1961.
- In round 21, Essendon hosted its last senior VFL/AFL match at Windy Hill, its home venue since 1922. Essendon played its home matches at the Melbourne Cricket Ground for the remainder of the 1990s.
- Jim Stynes became the first, and as of 2024 only, foreign-born winner of the highest individual award, the Brownlow Medal.
- West Coast did not concede more than 100 points in any game during the home-and-away season, being the first team to do this since 1967.
- In May, the AFL Commission adopted conditions to allow finals matches to be played outside Victoria for the first time, if the higher ranked team was non-Victorian and its ground managers could demonstrate there would be at least a comparable financial result to the match being played in Melbourne. The season's qualifying final between West Coast and Hawthorn, played at Subiaco Oval, became the first finals match played outside Victoria under these conditions.
- The capacity of the Melbourne Cricket Ground was reduced by half during 1991 as the new Great Southern Stand was constructed in preparation for the 1992 Cricket World Cup, to be played there from February 1992. One consequence of this was that Waverley Park hosted all finals that were played in Melbourne, including the grand final for the first and only time in its history. The other was that Hawthorn's plans move its home games from Princes Park to Waverley Park were delayed by one year: Hawthorn had played five home games at Waverley Park and six at Princes Park in 1990 as part of transitional arrangements for a permanent move in 1991, but the AFL reneged on the deal when it became clear that the ground was needed for blockbuster games throughout the year: as a compromise, Hawthorn again played five home games at Waverley Park and six at Princes Park during 1991, and then moved permanently to Waverley Park in 1992.
- The reserves premiership was won by Brisbane, who became the first non-Victorian team to win a VFL/AFL premiership at any grade (main: 1991 AFL reserves season).
- The final under-19s premiership was won by North Melbourne. The AFL under-19s competition was shut down at the end of the season, being replaced by an under-18s competition featuring six district-based clubs in Victoria that were unaffiliated to the VFL/AFL clubs.
- At the end of the season, Hawthorn captain Michael Tuck retired, having played a then-record 426 VFL/AFL matches (including seven premierships from 11 grand finals). The record stood until passed by Brent Harvey (North Melbourne) in Round 19 of 2016.

== Awards ==
- The Brownlow Medal was awarded to Jim Stynes of Melbourne
- The Coleman Medal was awarded to Tony Lockett of St Kilda
- The Norm Smith Medal was awarded to Paul Dear of Hawthorn
- The Leigh Matthews Trophy was awarded to Jim Stynes of Melbourne
- The Under 19's Wooden Spoon was "awarded" to Footscray
- The Reserves Wooden Spoon was "awarded" to Sydney
- The Seniors Wooden Spoon was "awarded" to Brisbane
- The Under 19's Grand Final was won by North Melbourne against Collingwood
- The Reserves Grand Final was won by Brisbane against Melbourne
- The Seniors Grand Final was won by Hawthorn against West Coast

== Sources ==
- 1991 AFL season at AFL Tables
- 1991 AFL season at Australian Football
