= 1996 AFL season =

100th season of the Australian Football League (AFL)

1996 AFL premiership season
- AFL Centenary logo
- Teams: 16
- Premiers: North Melbourne; 3rd premiership
- Minor premiers: Sydney; 7th minor premiership
- Pre-season cup: St Kilda; 1st pre-season cup win
- Brownlow Medallist: James Hird (Essendon); Michael Voss (Brisbane Bears)
- Coleman Medallist: Tony Lockett (Sydney)

Attendance
- Matches played: 185
- Total attendance: 5,694,921 (30,783 per match)
- Highest: 93,102 (Grand Final, North Melbourne vs. Sydney)

The 1996 AFL season was the 100th season of the Australian Football League (AFL), the highest level senior Australian rules football competition in Australia, which was known as the Victorian Football League until 1989. The season featured sixteen clubs and ran from 29 March until 28 September, comprising a 22-game home-and-away season followed by a finals series.

North Melbourne won the premiership for the third time, after it defeated Sydney by 43 points in the 1996 AFL Grand Final.

The season was the final season for Fitzroy, a founding member of the VFL/AFL in 1897, and there were several celebrations of the league's centenary throughout the year.

== Pre-season ==
=== Lightning Premiership ===
In the 1996 AFL Lightning Premiership final, Essendon defeated the Brisbane Bears 6.2 (38) to 2.9 (21) at Waverley Park.

=== Ansett Australia Cup ===
In the 1996 Ansett Australia Cup final, St Kilda defeated Carlton 20.10 (130) to 10.12 (72) at Waverley Park.

== Home-and-away season ==
=== Round 1 ===
Home team	Score	Away team	Score	Venue	Attendance	Date
Melbourne	8.8 (56)	Geelong	27.21 (183)	MCG	46,832	Friday, 29 March
Richmond	15.14 (104)	Essendon	19.8 (122)	MCG	52,271	Saturday, 30 March
St Kilda	12.13 (85)	North Melbourne	15.19 (109)	Waverley Park	23,434	Saturday, 30 March
Fitzroy	11.5 (71)	Hawthorn	13.14 (92)	Whitten Oval	10,239	Saturday, 30 March
Brisbane Bears	21.15 (141)	Footscray	7.12 (54)	Gabba	14,222	Saturday, 30 March
Carlton	16.13 (109)	Collingwood	12.15 (87)	MCG	70,152	Sunday, 31 March
Fremantle	6.9 (45)	West Coast	9.13 (67)	Subiaco Oval	33,041	Sunday, 31 March
Adelaide	20.10 (130)	Sydney	6.4 (40)	Football Park	40,665	Sunday, 31 March

=== Round 2 ===
Home team	Score	Away team	Score	Venue	Attendance	Date
North Melbourne	26.12 (168)	Footscray	5.7 (37)	MCG	30,873	Saturday, 6 April
Geelong	26.8 (164)	St Kilda	20.14 (134)	Kardinia Park	25,950	Saturday, 6 April
Hawthorn	6.15 (51)	Richmond	14.14 (98)	Waverley Park	38,263	Saturday, 6 April
Fitzroy	15.11 (101)	Adelaide	21.7 (133)	Whitten Oval	8,685	Saturday, 6 April
West Coast	11.11 (77)	Brisbane Bears	16.7 (103)	WACA	29,213	Saturday, 6 April
Essendon	10.12 (72)	Carlton	15.11 (101)	MCG	62,207	Sunday, 7 April
Sydney	9.17 (71)	Fremantle	13.22 (100)	SCG	10,965	Sunday, 7 April
Collingwood	27.11 (173)	Melbourne	11.13 (79)	MCG	53,268	Monday, 8 April

=== Round 3 ===
Home team	Score	Away team	Score	Venue	Attendance	Date
Adelaide	21.16 (142)	Geelong	12.6 (78)	Football Park	43,766	Friday, 12 April
Footscray	17.19 (121)	Fitzroy	10.10 (70)	Whitten Oval	14,345	Saturday, 13 April
Hawthorn	12.8 (80)	North Melbourne	22.21 (153)	Waverley Park	20,331	Saturday, 13 April
Brisbane Bears	13.12 (90)	Richmond	15.18 (108)	Gabba	20,635	Saturday, 13 April
Sydney	15.17 (107)	Collingwood	10.13 (73)	SCG	17,674	Sunday, 14 April
Fremantle	15.12 (102)	Carlton	6.13 (49)	Subiaco Oval	22,652	Sunday, 14 April
Essendon	16.13 (109)	West Coast	6.14 (50)	Waverley Park	20,852	Sunday, 14 April
Melbourne	14.14 (98)	St Kilda	13.10 (88)	Optus Oval	11,881	Sunday, 14 April

=== Round 4 ===
Home team	Score	Away team	Score	Venue	Attendance	Date
Brisbane Bears	18.17 (125)	North Melbourne	14.11 (95)	Gabba	17,469	Friday, 19 April
Carlton	21.7 (133)	Melbourne	12.14 (86)	Optus Oval	19,051	Saturday, 20 April
Collingwood	14.14 (98)	Fremantle	8.13 (61)	Victoria Park	23,170	Saturday, 20 April
St Kilda	24.16 (160)	Fitzroy	11.9 (75)	Waverley Park	17,625	Saturday, 20 April
Footscray	8.9 (57)	Hawthorn	8.9 (57)	Whitten Oval	16,804	Saturday, 20 April
Adelaide	23.23 (161)	Essendon	9.11 (65)	Football Park	45,266	Saturday, 20 April
Richmond	9.16 (70)	Sydney	10.11 (71)	Waverley Park	33,847	Sunday, 21 April
West Coast	12.16 (88)	Geelong	16.10 (106)	Subiaco Oval	30,837	Sunday, 21 April

=== Round 5 ===
Home team	Score	Away team	Score	Venue	Attendance	Date
Essendon	16.9 (105)	Collingwood	17.15 (117)	MCG	87,549	Thursday, 25 April
Fremantle	13.18 (96)	Melbourne	8.11 (59)	WACA	26,618	Friday, 26 April
Carlton	12.14 (86)	West Coast	12.13 (85)	Optus Oval	19,927	Saturday, 27 April
Geelong	13.13 (91)	Richmond	12.16 (88)	Kardinia Park	26,016	Saturday, 27 April
North Melbourne	23.14 (152)	Adelaide	17.11 (113)	MCG	32,215	Saturday, 27 April
Sydney	13.10 (88)	Hawthorn	11.10 (76)	SCG	20,227	Saturday, 27 April
Brisbane Bears	24.14 (158)	Fitzroy	6.13 (49)	Gabba	14,495	Sunday, 28 April
St Kilda	16.20 (116)	Footscray	13.12 (90)	Waverley Park	27,094	Sunday, 28 April

=== Round 6 ===
Home team	Score	Away team	Score	Venue	Attendance	Date
Sydney	14.6 (90)	Essendon	12.18 (90)	SCG	22,088	Friday, 3 May
Geelong	13.15 (93)	North Melbourne	15.14 (104)	MCG	50,074	Friday, 3 May
Collingwood	23.14 (152)	Adelaide	12.8 (80)	Victoria Park	26,459	Saturday, 4 May
Melbourne	7.8 (50)	West Coast	24.12 (156)	Optus Oval	8,747	Saturday, 4 May
Fitzroy	9.8 (62)	Richmond	23.16 (154)	Whitten Oval	13,497	Saturday, 4 May
Hawthorn	9.11 (65)	St Kilda	13.8 (86)	Waverley Park	30,225	Saturday, 4 May
Footscray	9.10 (64)	Carlton	12.8 (80)	MCG	31,024	Sunday, 5 May
Fremantle	12.13 (85)	Brisbane Bears	17.8 (110)	Subiaco Oval	24,591	Sunday, 5 May

=== Round 7 ===
Home team	Score	Away team	Score	Venue	Attendance	Date
Essendon	22.11 (143)	Geelong	17.12 (114)	MCG	75,632	Wednesday, 8 May
Collingwood	14.11 (95)	St Kilda	18.10 (118)	MCG	71,663	Friday, 10 May
Carlton	18.17 (125)	Fitzroy	8.14 (62)	Optus Oval	16,176	Saturday, 11 May
Melbourne	5.8 (38)	Sydney	12.10 (82)	MCG	23,660	Saturday, 11 May
Brisbane Bears	15.14 (104)	Hawthorn	5.11 (41)	Gabba	20,053	Saturday, 11 May
Richmond	17.11 (113)	Footscray	9.8 (62)	MCG	25,691	Sunday, 12 May
West Coast	19.11 (125)	North Melbourne	7.16 (58)	Subiaco Oval	32,312	Sunday, 12 May
Adelaide	20.12 (132)	Fremantle	5.6 (36)	Football Park	40,386	Sunday, 12 May

Note: The opening four matches of this round replicated the opening round of the inaugural 1897 VFL season, with Essendon and Geelong playing each other on the day of the 99th anniversary.

=== Round 8 ===
Home team	Score	Away team	Score	Venue	Attendance	Date
Brisbane Bears	15.18 (108)	Collingwood	14.14 (98)	Gabba	21,644	Friday, 17 May
Carlton	12.14 (86)	Geelong	15.8 (98)	MCG	67,931	Friday, 17 May
Hawthorn	19.8 (122)	Melbourne	10.11 (71)	Waverley Park	20,527	Saturday, 18 May
Fitzroy	16.11 (107)	Fremantle	10.16 (76)	Whitten Oval	5,083	Saturday, 18 May
North Melbourne	20.24 (144)	Richmond	14.5 (89)	MCG	49,939	Saturday, 18 May
West Coast	14.16 (100)	Sydney	9.10 (64)	WACA	31,411	Saturday, 18 May
Adelaide	13.19 (97)	St Kilda	11.7 (73)	Football Park	43,370	Sunday, 19 May
Footscray	13.6 (84)	Essendon	23.13 (151)	MCG	36,766	Sunday, 19 May

Note: Ben Hart took the mark of the year in Adelaide's win over St Kilda.
Note: Fitzroy's victory was the last win they had in the AFL before merging.

=== Round 9 ===
Home team	Score	Away team	Score	Venue	Attendance	Date
North Melbourne	25.20 (170)	Fitzroy	9.11 (65)	MCG	19,964	Friday, 24 May
Essendon	11.23 (89)	Melbourne	12.5 (77)	MCG	37,288	Saturday, 25 May
Footscray	18.11 (119)	Adelaide	11.13 (79)	Whitten Oval	11,140	Saturday, 25 May
Hawthorn	8.8 (56)	West Coast	14.6 (90)	Waverley Park	14,286	Saturday, 25 May
Sydney	21.6 (132)	Brisbane Bears	10.14 (74)	SCG	26,537	Sunday, 26 May
Fremantle	17.18 (120)	Richmond	10.6 (66)	Subiaco Oval	20,934	Sunday, 26 May
St Kilda	9.15 (69)	Carlton	13.13 (91)	Waverley Park	41,023	Sunday, 26 May
Collingwood	11.10 (76)	Geelong	21.13 (139)	MCG	56,609	Monday, 27 May

=== Round 10 ===
Home team	Score	Away team	Score	Venue	Attendance	Date
Footscray	10.9 (69)	North Melbourne	12.17 (89)	MCG	22,416	Friday, 7 June
Carlton	15.11 (101)	Richmond	13.12 (90)	MCG	59,062	Saturday, 8 June
Geelong	14.14 (98)	Brisbane Bears	15.8 (98)	Kardinia Park	24,800	Saturday, 8 June
Fitzroy	10.7 (67)	Sydney	21.11 (137)	Whitten Oval	9,701	Saturday, 8 June
St Kilda	9.13 (67)	Essendon	13.11 (89)	Waverley Park	43,925	Saturday, 8 June
Fremantle	7.11 (53)	Hawthorn	17.8 (110)	Subiaco Oval	19,350	Sunday, 9 June
Adelaide	11.10 (76)	West Coast	19.16 (130)	Football Park	43,398	Sunday, 9 June
Melbourne	17.12 (114)	Collingwood	10.16 (76)	MCG	48,302	Monday, 10 June

NOTE: St Kilda vs Essendon match on Saturday night was disrupted by a power failure during the third quarter, resulting the match being completed the following week on the Tuesday night with 2 12-minutes halves.

=== Round 11 ===
Home team	Score	Away team	Score	Venue	Attendance	Date
Geelong	20.9 (129)	Footscray	12.13 (85)	Kardinia Park	21,516	Saturday, 15 June
Hawthorn	16.12 (108)	Adelaide	14.15 (99)	Waverley Park	16,652	Saturday, 15 June
North Melbourne	10.13 (73)	Sydney	24.8 (152)	Optus Oval	18,644	Saturday, 15 June
Richmond	21.13 (139)	St Kilda	15.15 (105)	MCG	39,029	Saturday, 15 June
Brisbane Bears	5.8 (38)	Carlton	9.8 (62)	Gabba	20,225	Saturday, 15 June
West Coast	16.19 (115)	Collingwood	9.8 (62)	Subiaco Oval	34,832	Sunday, 16 June
Essendon	13.12 (90)	Fremantle	12.17 (89)	MCG	31,383	Sunday, 16 June
Fitzroy	8.8 (56)	Melbourne	18.11 (119)	Whitten Oval	10,836	Sunday, 16 June

=== Round 12 ===
Home team	Score	Away team	Score	Venue	Attendance	Date
Richmond	19.14 (128)	Adelaide	13.4 (82)	MCG	39,044	Friday, 21 June
Collingwood	14.11 (95)	Carlton	17.14 (116)	MCG	61,448	Saturday, 22 June
Geelong	17.10 (112)	Fremantle	13.15 (93)	Kardinia Park	22,116	Saturday, 22 June
Hawthorn	17.12 (114)	Fitzroy	12.11 (83)	Waverley Park	16,217	Saturday, 22 June
Brisbane Bears	18.15 (123)	Melbourne	6.10 (46)	Gabba	14,871	Saturday, 22 June
Sydney	18.15 (123)	Footscray	11.11 (77)	SCG	22,689	Sunday, 23 June
North Melbourne	16.11 (107)	Essendon	14.11 (95)	MCG	39,515	Sunday, 23 June
West Coast	22.9 (141)	St Kilda	17.6 (108)	Subiaco Oval	29,434	Sunday, 23 June

=== Round 13 ===
Home team	Score	Away team	Score	Venue	Attendance	Date
Collingwood	10.9 (69)	Richmond	14.8 (92)	MCG	69,072	Friday, 28 June
Carlton	13.13 (91)	Sydney	15.12 (102)	Optus Oval	20,030	Saturday, 29 June
Fitzroy	6.3 (39)	Geelong	25.16 (166)	Whitten Oval	10,504	Saturday, 29 June
St Kilda	14.12 (96)	Brisbane Bears	7.8 (50)	Waverley Park	13,824	Saturday, 29 June
Essendon	18.13 (121)	Hawthorn	15.10 (100)	MCG	43,481	Saturday, 29 June
Fremantle	8.10 (58)	North Melbourne	9.20 (74)	WACA	19,360	Saturday, 29 June
Adelaide	10.12 (72)	Melbourne	19.9 (123)	Football Park	37,557	Sunday, 30 June
Footscray	9.5 (59)	West Coast	11.5 (71)	Whitten Oval	11,184	Sunday, 30 June

=== Round 14 ===
Home team	Score	Away team	Score	Venue	Attendance	Date
North Melbourne	21.18 (144)	Carlton	13.11 (89)	MCG	68,537	Friday, 5 July
Hawthorn	17.12 (114)	Collingwood	11.15 (81)	Waverley Park	30,886	Saturday, 6 July
Fitzroy	7.10 (52)	Essendon	17.16 (118)	Optus Oval	12,748	Saturday, 6 July
Richmond	7.9 (51)	West Coast	10.8 (68)	MCG	37,482	Saturday, 6 July
Adelaide	15.12 (102)	Brisbane Bears	14.10 (94)	Football Park	34,183	Saturday, 6 July
Sydney	18.17 (125)	Geelong	11.8 (74)	SCG	44,047	Sunday, 7 July
Melbourne	14.10 (94)	Footscray	10.7 (67)	MCG	22,852	Sunday, 7 July
Fremantle	11.11 (77)	St Kilda	15.10 (100)	Subiaco Oval	17,697	Sunday, 7 July

=== Round 15 ===
Home team	Score	Away team	Score	Venue	Attendance	Date
West Coast	20.11 (131)	Fitzroy	9.9 (63)	WACA	22,044	Friday, 12 July
Carlton	19.17 (131)	Adelaide	9.10 (64)	Optus Oval	20,102	Saturday, 13 July
Collingwood	22.12 (144)	North Melbourne	12.11 (83)	MCG	34,514	Saturday, 13 July
Geelong	10.12 (72)	Hawthorn	11.8 (74)	Kardinia Park	22,207	Saturday, 13 July
St Kilda	11.13 (79)	Sydney	14.12 (96)	Waverley Park	34,337	Saturday, 13 July
Brisbane Bears	15.13 (103)	Essendon	10.8 (68)	Gabba	20,378	Sunday, 14 July
Melbourne	12.9 (81)	Richmond	18.19 (127)	MCG	41,380	Sunday, 14 July
Footscray	18.9 (117)	Fremantle	15.9 (99)	Whitten Oval	8,674	Sunday, 14 July

=== Round 16 ===
Home team	Score	Away team	Score	Venue	Attendance	Date
North Melbourne	17.16 (118)	St Kilda	4.5 (29)	MCG	24,778	Friday, 19 July
Essendon	15.18 (108)	Richmond	13.10 (88)	MCG	58,768	Saturday, 20 July
Footscray	3.4 (22)	Brisbane Bears	4.12 (36)	Whitten Oval	9,994	Saturday, 20 July
Geelong	13.10 (88)	Melbourne	4.6 (30)	Kardinia Park	17,538	Saturday, 20 July
Hawthorn	15.8 (98)	Carlton	7.7 (49)	Waverley Park	28,670	Saturday, 20 July
Sydney	16.14 (110)	Adelaide	12.16 (88)	SCG	29,174	Sunday, 21 July
West Coast	12.10 (82)	Fremantle	7.6 (48)	Subiaco Oval	35,406	Sunday, 21 July
Collingwood	17.14 (116)	Fitzroy	10.16 (76)	Victoria Park	23,567	Sunday, 21 July

=== Round 17 ===
Home team	Score	Away team	Score	Venue	Attendance	Date
Melbourne	11.4 (70)	North Melbourne	28.15 (183)	MCG	20,955	Friday, 26 July
Carlton	13.13 (91)	Essendon	11.16 (82)	MCG	65,420	Saturday, 27 July
St Kilda	14.16 (100)	Geelong	11.10 (76)	Waverley Park	24,289	Saturday, 27 July
Richmond	17.12 (114)	Hawthorn	11.7 (73)	Optus Oval	19,081	Saturday, 27 July
Brisbane Bears	25.13 (163)	West Coast	17.14 (116)	Gabba	15,772	Saturday, 27 July
Footscray	16.12 (108)	Collingwood	17.12 (114)	MCG	28,776	Sunday, 28 July
Fremantle	15.14 (104)	Sydney	12.6 (78)	Subiaco Oval	17,513	Sunday, 28 July
Adelaide	26.10 (166)	Fitzroy	9.13 (67)	Football Park	31,880	Sunday, 28 July

=== Round 18 ===
Home team	Score	Away team	Score	Venue	Attendance	Date
North Melbourne	19.16 (130)	Hawthorn	15.9 (99)	MCG	28,555	Friday, 2 August
Carlton	23.7 (145)	Fremantle	11.18 (84)	Optus Oval	15,277	Saturday, 3 August
St Kilda	13.10 (88)	Collingwood	11.12 (78)	Waverley Park	30,065	Saturday, 3 August
Geelong	15.14 (104)	Adelaide	10.9 (69)	Kardinia Park	17,818	Saturday, 3 August
Sydney	17.13 (115)	Melbourne	6.16 (52)	SCG	18,850	Sunday, 4 August
West Coast	14.15 (99)	Essendon	14.9 (93)	Subiaco Oval	37,669	Sunday, 4 August
Fitzroy	6.9 (45)	Footscray	8.12 (60)	Whitten Oval	8,757	Sunday, 4 August
Richmond	7.11 (53)	Brisbane Bears	9.16 (70)	Optus Oval	17,157	Sunday, 4 August

=== Round 19 ===
Home team	Score	Away team	Score	Venue	Attendance	Date
Fremantle	15.16 (106)	Collingwood	11.16 (82)	WACA	22,874	Friday, 9 August
Melbourne	20.9 (129)	Carlton	17.8 (110)	MCG	30,166	Saturday, 10 August
Essendon	21.17 (143)	Adelaide	16.11 (107)	Optus Oval	15,794	Saturday, 10 August
Geelong	18.19 (127)	West Coast	12.10 (82)	Kardinia Park	21,081	Saturday, 10 August
Fitzroy	5.5 (35)	St Kilda	13.10 (88)	Whitten Oval	7,781	Saturday, 10 August
Hawthorn	20.12 (132)	Footscray	10.5 (65)	Waverley Park	14,914	Saturday, 10 August
Sydney	20.10 (130)	Richmond	12.10 (82)	SCG	28,541	Sunday, 11 August
North Melbourne	8.11 (59)	Brisbane Bears	11.11 (77)	Optus Oval	15,453	Sunday, 11 August

=== Round 20 ===
Home team	Score	Away team	Score	Venue	Attendance	Date
Melbourne	13.14 (92)	Fremantle	10.11 (71)	MCG	15,494	Friday, 16 August
Richmond	19.18 (132)	Geelong	9.13 (67)	MCG	50,633	Saturday, 17 August
Hawthorn	7.7 (49)	Sydney	9.18 (72)	Waverley Park	28,897	Saturday, 17 August
Fitzroy	14.16 (100)	Brisbane Bears	29.13 (187)	Optus Oval	6,469	Saturday, 17 August
Adelaide	10.10 (70)	North Melbourne	10.16 (76)	Football Park	33,030	Saturday, 17 August
Footscray	14.11 (95)	St Kilda	8.9 (57)	Optus Oval	7,677	Sunday, 18 August
Collingwood	9.10 (64)	Essendon	11.11 (77)	MCG	51,057	Sunday, 18 August
West Coast	19.13 (127)	Carlton	10.8 (68)	Subiaco Oval	40,085	Sunday, 18 August

=== Round 21 ===
Home team	Score	Away team	Score	Venue	Attendance	Date
North Melbourne	14.12 (96)	Geelong	16.13 (109)	MCG	52,426	Friday, 23 August
Carlton	13.18 (96)	Footscray	9.12 (66)	Optus Oval	21,674	Saturday, 24 August
Essendon	14.16 (100)	Sydney	12.10 (82)	MCG	69,237	Saturday, 24 August
St Kilda	9.9 (63)	Hawthorn	12.8 (80)	Waverley Park	28,118	Saturday, 24 August
Brisbane Bears	10.11 (71)	Fremantle	10.10 (70)	Gabba	19,204	Saturday, 24 August
Richmond	28.19 (187)	Fitzroy	5.6 (36)	MCG	48,884	Sunday, 25 August
West Coast	24.7 (151)	Melbourne	11.12 (78)	Subiaco Oval	33,689	Sunday, 25 August
Adelaide	14.12 (96)	Collingwood	24.9 (153)	Football Park	40,212	Sunday, 25 August

=== Round 22 ===
Home team	Score	Away team	Score	Venue	Attendance	Date
Essendon	11.13 (79)	Footscray	11.10 (76)	MCG	42,598	Friday, 30 August
Geelong	9.11 (65)	Carlton	16.11 (107)	Kardinia Park	27,659	Saturday, 31 August
Collingwood	15.10 (100)	Brisbane Bears	6.15 (51)	Victoria Park	21,126	Saturday, 31 August
St Kilda	20.24 (144)	Adelaide	11.9 (75)	Waverley Park	14,778	Saturday, 31 August
Melbourne	15.11 (101)	Hawthorn	15.12 (102)	MCG	63,196	Saturday, 31 August
Sydney	12.13 (85)	West Coast	6.14 (50)	SCG	29,517	Saturday, 31 August
Richmond	16.13 (109)	North Melbourne	21.15 (141)	MCG	61,740	Sunday, 1 September
Fremantle	24.13 (157)	Fitzroy	10.11 (71)	Subiaco Oval	22,574	Sunday, 1 September

Note: Last game of Fitzroy Lions before merger with Brisbane Bears to become Brisbane Lions.

== Ladder ==
Pos	Team	Pld	W	L	D	PF	PA	PP	Pts	Qualification
1	Sydney	22	16	5	1	2152	1737	123.9	66	Finals series
2	North Melbourne (P)	22	16	6	0	2526	1982	127.4	64	Finals series
3	Brisbane Bears	22	15	6	1	2174	1731	125.6	62	Finals series
4	West Coast	22	15	7	0	2201	1758	125.2	60	Finals series
5	Carlton	22	15	7	0	2116	1909	110.8	60	Finals series
6	Essendon	22	14	7	1	2209	2023	109.2	58	Finals series
7	Geelong	22	13	8	1	2353	2047	114.9	54	Finals series
8	Hawthorn	22	11	10	1	1893	1921	98.5	46	Finals series
9	Richmond	22	11	11	0	2282	1944	117.4	44	
10	St Kilda	22	10	12	0	2053	2033	101.0	40	
11	Collingwood	22	9	13	0	2203	2142	102.8	36	
12	Adelaide	22	8	14	0	2233	2327	96.0	32	
13	Fremantle	22	7	15	0	1830	1983	92.3	28	
14	Melbourne	22	7	15	0	1743	2463	70.8	28	
15	Footscray	22	5	16	1	1654	2139	77.3	22	
16	Fitzroy	22	1	21	0	1452	2935	49.5	4	

Source: AFL Tables
Rules for classification: 1) points; 2) percentage; 3) number of points for.
(P) Premiers

== Progression by round ==
Numbers highlighted in green indicate that the team finished the round inside the top 8.
Numbers highlighted in blue indicates the team finished first on the ladder in that round.
Numbers highlighted in red indicates the team finished in last place on the ladder in that round.

Team ╲ Round	1	2	3	4	5	6	7	8	9	10	11	12	13	14	15	16	17	18	19	20	21	22
Sydney	0	0	4	8	12	14	18	18	22	26	30	34	38	42	46	50	50	54	58	62	62	66
North Melbourne (P)	4	8	12	12	16	20	20	24	28	32	32	36	40	44	44	48	52	56	56	60	60	64
Brisbane Bears	4	8	8	12	16	20	24	28	28	30	30	34	34	34	38	42	46	50	54	58	62	62
West Coast Eagles	4	4	4	4	4	8	12	16	20	24	28	32	36	40	44	48	48	52	52	56	60	60
Carlton	4	8	8	12	16	20	24	24	28	32	36	40	40	40	44	44	48	52	52	52	56	60
Essendon	4	4	8	8	8	10	14	18	22	26	30	30	34	38	38	42	42	42	46	50	54	58
Geelong	4	8	8	12	16	16	16	20	24	26	30	34	38	38	38	42	42	46	50	50	54	54
Hawthorn	4	4	4	6	6	6	6	10	10	14	18	22	22	26	30	34	34	34	38	38	42	46
Richmond	0	4	8	8	8	12	16	16	16	16	20	24	28	28	32	32	36	36	36	40	44	44
St Kilda	0	0	0	4	8	12	16	16	16	16	16	16	20	24	24	24	28	32	36	36	36	40
Collingwood	0	4	4	8	12	16	16	16	16	16	16	16	16	16	20	24	28	28	28	28	32	36
Adelaide	4	8	12	16	16	16	20	24	24	24	24	24	24	28	28	28	32	32	32	32	32	32
Fremantle	0	4	8	8	12	12	12	12	16	16	16	16	16	16	16	16	20	20	24	24	24	28
Melbourne	0	0	4	4	4	4	4	4	4	8	12	12	16	20	20	20	20	20	24	28	28	28
Footscray	0	0	4	6	6	6	6	6	10	10	10	10	10	10	14	14	14	18	18	22	22	22
Fitzroy	0	0	0	0	0	0	0	4	4	4	4	4	4	4	4	4	4	4	4	4	4	4

== Finals series ==
=== Qualifying Finals ===
Home team	Score	Away team	Score	Venue	Attendance	Date
Brisbane Bears	15.11 (101)	Essendon	15.10 (100)	Gabba	21,964	Friday, 6 September
West Coast	18.17 (125)	Carlton	10.10 (70)	Subiaco Oval	41,501	Saturday, 7 September
Sydney	13.12 (90)	Hawthorn	12.12 (84)	SCG	37,010	Saturday, 7 September
North Melbourne	19.17 (131)	Geelong	9.17 (71)	MCG	69,323	Sunday, 8 September

=== Semi-finals ===
Home team	Score	Away team	Score	Venue	Attendance	Date
West Coast	8.19 (67)	Essendon	22.12 (144)	MCG	85,656	Saturday, 14 September
Brisbane Bears	26.14 (170)	Carlton	10.13 (73)	Gabba	21,767	Saturday, 14 September

=== Preliminary Finals ===
Home team	Score	Away team	Score	Venue	Attendance	Date
North Melbourne	17.12 (114)	Brisbane Bears	11.10 (76)	MCG	66,719	Saturday, 21 September
Sydney	10.10 (70)	Essendon	10.9 (69)	SCG	41,731	Saturday, 21 September

=== Grand Final ===
Home team	Score	Away team	Score	Venue	Attendance	Date
North Melbourne	19.17 (131)	Sydney	13.10 (88)	MCG	93,102	Saturday, 28 September

== Attendance ==
Team	Hosted	Average	Highest	Lowest	Total
Essendon	11	49,526	87,549	15,794	544,789
Collingwood	11	44,723	71,663	21,126	491,953
Adelaide	11	39,428	45,266	31,880	433,713
Richmond	11	38,624	61,740	17,157	424,859
Carlton	11	35,891	70,152	15,277	394,802
North Melbourne	11	34,627	68,537	15,453	380,899
West Coast	11	32,448	40,085	22,044	356,932
Melbourne	11	30,315	63,196	8747	333,465
St Kilda	11	27,137	43,925	13,824	298,512
Geelong	11	25,161	50,074	17,538	276,775
Sydney	11	24,574	44,047	10,965	270,309
Hawthorn	11	23,624	38,263	14,286	259,868
Fremantle	11	22,473	33,041	17,513	247,204
Brisbane	11	18,088	21,644	14,222	198,968
Footscray	11	18,073	36,766	7677	198,800
Fitzroy	11	9482	13,497	5083	104,300
Totals	176	29,637	87,549	5083	5,216,148

Venue	Hosted	Average	Highest	Lowest	Total
MCG	51	46,114	87,549	15,494	2351,808
Football Park	11	39,428	45,266	31,880	433,713
Subiaco Oval	16	28,289	40,085	17,513	452,616
Waverley Park	24	25,545	43,925	13,824	613,079
WACA	6	25,253	31,411	19,360	151,520
SCG	11	24,574	44,047	10,965	270,309
Victoria Park	4	23,581	26,459	21,126	94,322
Kardinia Park	10	22,670	27,659	17,538	226,701
Gabba	11	18,088	21,644	14,222	198,968
Optus Oval	17	15,641	21,674	6469	265,892
Whitten Oval	15	10,482	16,804	5083	157,224
Totals	176	29,637	87,549	5083	5,216,148

== Awards ==
- The Brownlow Medal was awarded to Michael Voss of Brisbane Bears and James Hird of Essendon.
- The Leigh Matthews Trophy was awarded to Corey McKernan of North Melbourne.
- The Coleman Medal was awarded to Tony Lockett of Sydney.
- The Norm Smith Medal was awarded to Glenn Archer of North Melbourne.
- The AFL Rising Star award was awarded to Ben Cousins of West Coast.
- The Wooden Spoon was "awarded" to Fitzroy in their final season before the club merged with the Brisbane Bears.
- The reserves premiership was won by North Melbourne
- The seniors premiership was won by North Melbourne

== Notes ==
- North Melbourne's Corey McKernan received the same number of Brownlow Medal votes as the joint-winners James Hird and Michael Voss, but was ineligible to receive a medal as McKernan was suspended for one match during the season for kneeing. McKernan went on to win the AFL Players Association MVP, which is not subject to the same eligibility criteria.
- The Round 10 game between St Kilda and Essendon was interrupted at the twenty-minute mark of the third quarter when Waverley Park lost power, causing the floodlights to go off. The remaining 24 minutes was played three nights later on Tuesday, 11 June.
  - Subsequently, the AFL introduced contingencies that a game could be abandoned, with the progress result accepted as final at any point beyond half time, at the agreement of the captains when (a) any unexpected incident delays a game by an hour, or (b) if dangerous weather conditions, most typically lightning, prevail.
- Footscray's 1996 season became the subject of the sports film, Year of the Dogs, which was released theatrically the following year.
  - After their round 17 loss to Collingwood, caretaker coach Terry Wallace infamously sprayed the players during his post-match address.
- North Melbourne received a special gold-coloured premiership cup, instead of the typical silver, to signify what the AFL had represented as its Centenary Season throughout 1996. (Note: 1996 was the VFL/AFL's hundredth season, which by strictest definition is not the same as the centenary year, which would have been in 1997).
- Sydney recorded its first finals win since 1945 in the qualifying final against Hawthorn, and reached its first grand final since the same season (as South Melbourne).
- The season is perhaps best remembered for its preliminary final between minor premiers Sydney and sixth-placed Essendon. With scores level on 10.9 (69), Sydney's Tony Lockett scored a behind with a kick after the siren to win the game, and sent the Swans into their first Grand Final since 1945.
  - Lockett had been under an injury cloud with a groin problem during the preceding week, and there was some doubt whether he would play.

== Sources ==
- 1996 AFL season at AFL Tables
- 1996 AFL season at Australian Football
