= Florinda =

Florinda may refer to:

The name Florinda is Latin from the countries Italy, Spain and Portugal. It comes from the words Floris & Flora (bloom) meaning Flower (blooming flower.)

- Florinda coccinea, the blacktailed red sheetweaver
- Florinda (TV series) from the Philippines
- Florinda, Florida, a former community
- Doña Florinda, a character from the Mexican sitcom El Chavo del Ocho

As a given name

- Florinda la Cava, legendary Spaniard
- Florinda Bolkan, Brazilian actress
- Florinda Donner, German-born American author and anthropologist
- Florinda Grandino de Oliveira, birth name of Linda Batista, Brazilian musician
- Florinda Handcock, Viscountess Castlemaine, wife of William Handcock, 1st Viscount Castlemaine
- Florinda Meza, Mexican actress
- Florinda da Rosa Silva Chan, Macau civil servant

Creative works

- Florinda, or les Maures en Espagne, an 1851 an opera by Sigismond Thalberg
- Florinda (painting), an 1852 painting by Franz Xaver Winterhalter
