= Sophie Cruvelli =

German opera singer (1826–1907)

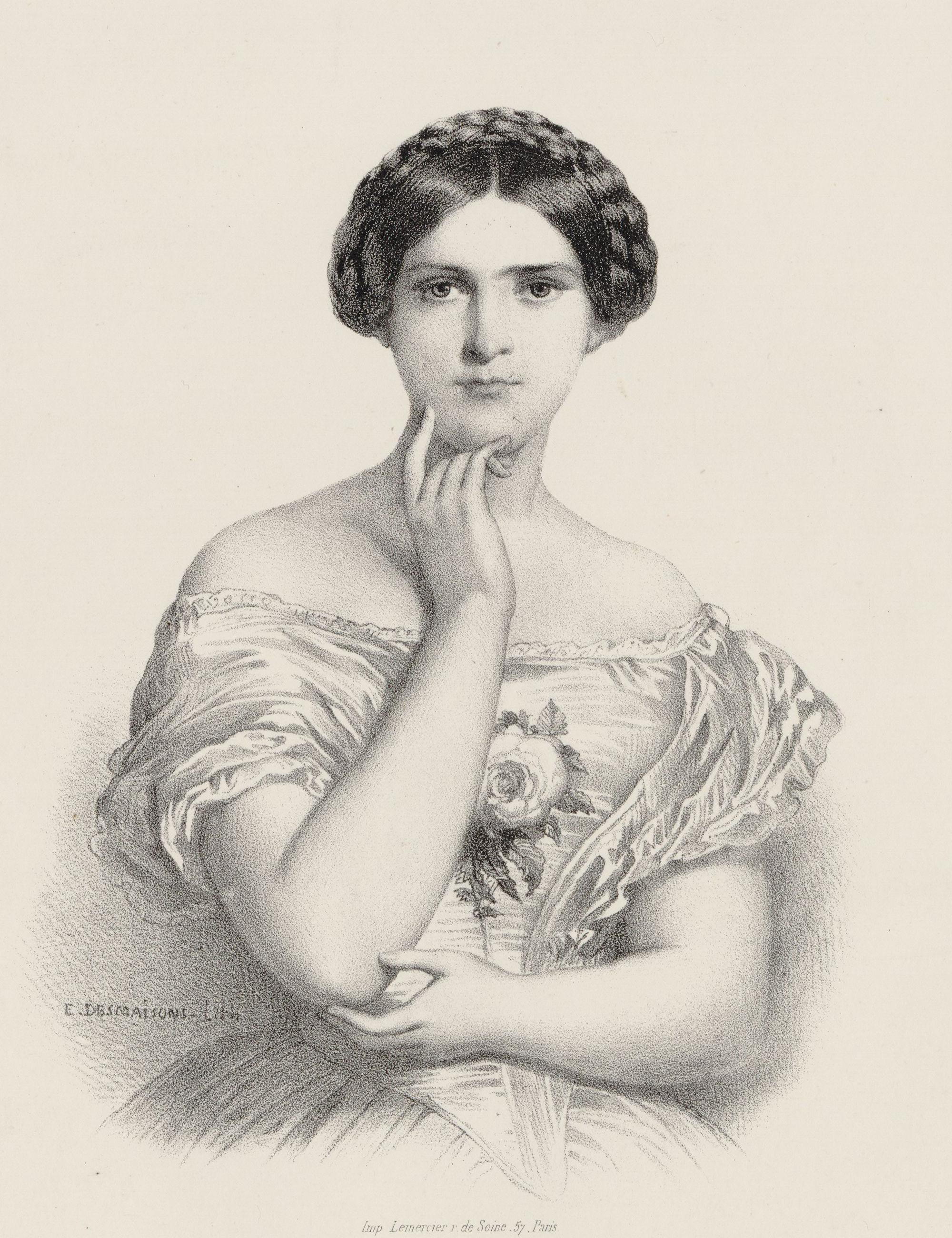
Soprano Sophie Cruvelli, 1852

Sophie Johanne Charlotte Crüwell, vicountess Vigier, stage name Sophie Cruvelli (12 March 1826 – 6 November 1907) was a German opera singer. She was a dramatic soprano who had a brief but stellar public career especially in London and Paris in the middle years of the 19th century. She was admired for her vocal powers and as a tragédienne. Both Verdi and Meyerbeer created operatic roles with the intention that she should first perform them.

== Origins and training ==
Sophie Crüwell was the daughter of a Protestant Bielefeld family of comfortable means. She showed an early disposition towards music, and she and her sister Marie (later a mezzo-soprano) and her brother (later a baritone) were encouraged and assisted to training by the family. Sophie and Marie commenced their vocal studies with Louis Spohr in Kassel.

In 1844 their mother took the girls to Paris to continue their studies, first with Francesco Piermarini, and then with the distinguished tenor Marco Bordogni. Bordogni thought highly of Sophie: it is said that he allowed her to sing only scales and solfeggi which he composed for her, for two whole years. After that time mother Crüwell wanted to remove her, saying that she had learnt scales enough and that if she was going to do nothing else she might as well get married and give it up. Bordogni persuaded mother that she would have a wonderful career, and that she should go on to complete her studies in Milan. A first public appearance in January 1846 was reported in the musical journal Revue et Gazette Musicale de Paris.

In Milan she first went to audition with the impresario Bartolomeo Merelli, but was so struck with fright that she could not produce any sound at all. After this she resolved to return to Bielefeld: but the (later famous) teacher Francesco Lamperti took the situation in hand, and under his guidance her voice and powers returned and flourished.

Some sources attribute her debut to Venice at La Fenice, as Odabella in Verdi's Attila. She appeared in that role at Udine on 24 July 1847, and later as Lucrezia in I due Foscari in the same theatre. Later in 1847 she was singing Odabella in Rovigo, and it was there, at the end of that year, that Benjamin Lumley heard and ('struck with the splendid voice, the impulsive dramatic temperament, the spirit, and the captivating person') recruited her for the season of 1848 at Her Majesty's Theatre in London, of which he was the impresario. The family objected that she was too young to face the English public, but Lumley was urged to proceed by the tenor Rubini: 'I tell you plainly, and with deep conviction, that you are making an excellent acquisition. A most beautiful voice – give her good models and a good maestro'. Sophie herself was delighted with the proposals. In the winter of 1847 she made several appearances at La Fenice.

Cruvelli, who was becoming a distinctly striking and beautiful woman, developed a reputation for romantic eccentricity. It was related that she was one of those young women who followed Franz Liszt 'from city to city, attending his concerts in a front row seat, much to his annoyance. Her prima donna rivals had nicknamed her "Mme. Hinterlist" – meaning both "after Liszt" and "perfidious".' If the depth of her friendship with Liszt was unproven, her relations with the married singer Agardi Metrovich are more directly in evidence.

== London, Milan, Trieste ==
Cruvelli made her London début at Her Majesty's Theatre for Lumley on 19 February 1848 as Elvira in Verdi's Ernani with two other debutants, Signor Cuzzani (a Berlin favourite) as Ernani, Giovanni Belletti as Silva, and the tenor Italo Gardoni, London's young favourite, in the baritone role of the King (for good measure). Cruvelli at first experienced 'sudden and awful nervousness' before the thronged audience, but soon settled and was a decided success.

Next she appeared as Rosina in Il barbiere di Siviglia with Gardoni, Belletti (as Figaro) and Federico Lablache as Bartolo. There followed (14 March) the British premiere of Attila (in which Cruvelli had already distinguished herself), with Belletti, Gardoni and Cuzzani. If Italy thought the work Verdi's masterpiece, London didn't like it. H. F. Chorley wrote:

We were still not habituated to Signor Verdi's violent music. An attempt was made by Mademoiselle Cruvelli, by extra animation in the amazonian part of its heroine, to "improve" the political events of the insurrectionary year 1848. But the fire was not sacred – the flame did not kindle our cold hearts – the patriotic shout fell on deaf ears.

So instead, I due Foscari was revived for Cruvelli's appearance with Filippo Coletti. A brief illness delayed her performance of Lucrezia Borgia, but the cast of Gardoni (Gennaro), Luigi Lablache (Alfonso) and the debutante Mlle Schwarz (Orsini) made it worth waiting for. All this occurred before Easter 1848. H. F. Chorley at this time said she had 'youth – a presence commanding, if somewhat peculiar – a superb voice, almost three octaves in compass – and a fervour and ambition which it could not then be foreseen would take their after-forms of reckless and perverse eccentricity.'

Jenny Lind was then the London rage, and Cruvelli now appeared as the Countess to Lind's Susanna in Le nozze di Figaro, with Lablache, Coletti, Belletti and Bouche, and with Mlle Schwartz as Cherubino. Later that season Cruvelli sang Abigaille in Nabucco. Eugenia Tadolini was also making her debut, but did not maintain the foothold in London which Cruvelli achieved. 'It was difficult, indeed almost impossible, both for Cruvelli and Tadolini to shed their really bright rays, whilst the great planet Jenny Lind was in the ascendant.' The whole season culminated in Lind's Farewell.

Cruvelli had a short spell in Bellini's Norma at the Royal Opera House in Berlin, and then sang from November 1848 until March 1849 at the Teatro Grande in Trieste, mainly in Verdi's Attila, Ernani and Macbeth, and in Don Pasquale. At the end of 1849 she sang Odabella in Verdi's Attila as the leading lady at the opening night of La Scala in Milan, and through the ensuing season (1850) made no fewer than sixty appearances there in Attila, Nabucco, Ernani, Il barbiere di Siviglia, Norma and Vincenzo Capecelatro's David Riccio. In the same year she appeared at the Teatro Carlo Felice in Genoa in Verdi's new opera Luisa Miller, and repeated her Ernani, Nabucco, Attila, and Norma. In Milan and Genoa she made a great sensation.

== 1851–1852: Théâtre-Italien (Paris) and Her Majesty's (London) ==
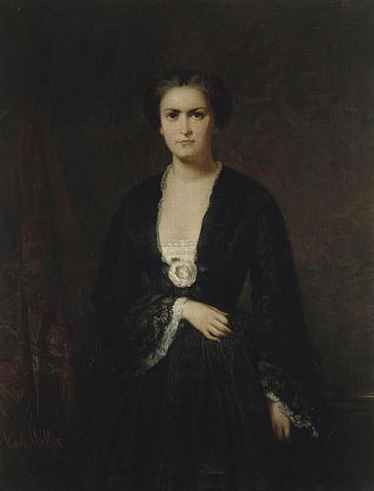
Portrait of Sophie Cruvelli by Karl Friedrich Johann von Müller (1852) Château de Compiègne

When Benjamin Lumley also became impresario of the Paris Théâtre-Italien in 1851, he engaged Cruvelli and the tenor Sims Reeves for both London and Paris. Reeves made his own Paris debut in the winter season in Linda di Chamounix, with Henrietta Sontag, and then went on to partner Cruvelli in her debut there, in April 1851, in Ernani. This was a sensation, and in Paris she also sang Norma, La Sonnambula, Fidelio and Semiramide.

It was however at Her Majesty's, London on 20 May 1851, that she and Reeves won very great acclaim for their Fidelio, the first of five performances which established her in the public mind as a leading tragédienne: critics compared her with her great predecessors in the role, Wilhelmine Schröder-Devrient and Maria Malibran. Gardoni and Calzolari led the Chorus of Prisoners. For this production, musical recitatives were composed by Michael Balfe imitating Beethoven's style, pointing the content of the dialogue with motifs drawn from the principal arias. Most appreciated them, but James William Davison, critic of The Times, was angered because he claimed that Cruvelli had altered the music 'in such a way as to bring it within range of mediocre capabilities.' Chorley, never an admirer, thought this was the turning-point, where her decline began. Then three performances of Norma, in which Cruvelli gave herself free rein, generated much enthusiasm in London. Cruvelli sang at Buckingham Palace on 7 June 1851, and was invited again the following year.

The London season included the première of Sigismond Thalberg's opera Florinda, which did not survive despite a cast including Cruvelli, Reeves, Calzolari, Coletti and Lablache, and despite a royal visit to the performance. This was the London debut of Sophie's sister Maria Cruvelli, in a contralto role. But Cruvelli's successes continued there with Le nozze di Figaro with Sontag, Fiorentini, Coletti, Ferranti and Lablache, and in Ernani with Sims Reeves. Linda di Chamounix was given with both Cruvelli sisters, 'which was less congenial to the wild and passionate nature of the charming Sophie than any of her more tragic parts.'

Michael Balfe's opera Les Quatre fils Aymon based on The Four Sons of Aymon was given, as I quattro fratelli as a benefit for the composer, and was a triumph: 'Cruvelli, aided by Gardoni, Pardini, Coletti, and Massol, secured an effective and spirited execution for the work.' The Her Majesty's concerts took place, including a performance of the trio 'Don't tickle me I pray' with each part triplicated, with sopranos Cruvelli, Sontag and Jenny Duprez, tenors Reeves, Calzolari and Gardoni, bassi Lablache and others. Cruvelli had 'extra' performances of Il barbiere and La Sonnambula (sung during the season by Sontag), and was considered to have been the star of the 1851 season at Her Majesty's.

Late in 1851 Cruvelli went to the Théâtre-Italien for the winter, and the following spring returned to London to sing with Gardoni and Lablache, appearing in La Sonnambula and Il barbiere di Siviglia, Ernani and Fidelio. However, the affairs of the theatre were failing, a situation fed by rumour and despondency. Lumley's company made valiant efforts: the stalwarts, Cruvelli, Lablache, and Gardoni sang Norma, and were powerful attractions. Lumley had achieved the remarkable coup of booking the soprano Johanna Jachmann-Wagner to sing at Her Majesty's in May 1852, but she (or her father and agent Albert, Richard Wagner's brother) were bribed by a better offer from the Covent Garden management and broke their contract. A lawsuit followed.

=== The "Flight of Cruvelli" ===
In the midst of this crisis Sophie Cruvelli, the surviving mainstay of the company, suddenly disappeared from London, on the day she was to have sung Lucrezia Borgia. "Where's Cruvelli?" became a burlesque by-word. She had fled to Germany, and in time reports came in that she was singing in Wiesbaden, and then that she was singing Fidès in Le prophète at Aix-la-Chapelle. This was the original so-called "Flight of Cruvelli", and for the time being put an end to her London appearances. Yet when Verdi wanted to cast Cruvelli as Violetta for the première of La traviata, which was presented with a different singer in Venice in March 1853, he was unable to do so because she was still under contract to Lumley.

== 1854–1855: L'Opéra and Covent Garden ==
During 1853, Sophie Cruvelli made appearances at the Théatre-Italien and became a favourite of Emperor Napoléon III, despite, or perhaps assisted by, her reputation for mischievous ill-temper and unreasonableness. She was increasingly admired by Giacomo Meyerbeer, and in January 1854 she was (with his support) engaged by the Paris Opéra at the hitherto highest ever fee of 100,000 francs (about €600,000) for eight months. She sang Valentine in Les Huguenots before the Emperor and an audience of the great and famous, scored a triumph, and continued with Julia in Spontini's La vestale and with Rachel in Halévy's La Juive. With each role, Cruvelli's stature as a tragédienne was increasing.

Early in 1854 she was offered the title role in a new opera by Charles Gounod, La nonne sanglante, but declined it. The role was instead offered to Palmyre Wertheimber, a new singer from the Opéra-Comique who had made her debut at the Opéra as Fidès in Le prophète and was much admired and praised by Théophile Gautier. Cruvelli, meanwhile, returned to London for engagements at Covent Garden, where she sang Desdemona in Rossini's Otello (with Antonio Tamburini and Giorgio Ronconi), Leonore (in Fidelio) and Donna Anna (Don Giovanni). Chorley, who never admired her, called it 'an inroad, the result of which in no respect bore out her popularity in the Haymarket.' She then went back to Paris to sing Alice in Robert le diable, and through that summer and autumn was the reigning goddess at the Opéra. She was required to sing only two nights a week and was receiving a very substantial fee for each performance. By autumn, rehearsals were under way for a new Verdi opera written specially for her, Les vêpres Siciliennes. Her performance of Les Huguenots , scheduled for the beginning of October 1854, was eagerly awaited.

Achille Fould, a senior political minister, increasingly involved himself in her public and private affairs. Wertheimber's première of La nonne sanglante, with Louis Guéymard, was set for 18 October 1854. The Opéra administration under Nestor Roqueplan was fragile, despite having had direct State funding; a recent series of new productions had all done poorly.

=== Verdi, Les vêpres Siciliennes, and the "Second Flight" ===
A crisis was precipitated when, just before the performance of Les Huguenots scheduled for 9 October, Cruvelli drew her fees and disappeared (her second "Flight"), taking with her some compromising letters from M. Fould. A distraint was put on Cruvelli's possessions, and a forfeit of 300,000 francs was threatened, but she did not reappear for a month. La nonne sanglante was performed and was moderately successful with receipts averaging over 6,000 francs per evening, but was widely condemned for its libretto. The absence of Cruvelli prompted Verdi to threaten to cancel the première of the Sicilian Vespers, and on 6 November Roqueplan, who had run up a deficit of 900,000 francs, was asked to resign, and his adversary Louis Crosnier (former director of the Opéra-Comique) replaced him on the 11th. In October 1854 the rumour was that Cruvelli had fled to Brussels to be married to Baron Vigier, a Parisian of immense fortune.

For Verdi, his time at the Opéra was one of the most frustrating he had ever experienced. Not only was the librettist, Scribe, unresponsive to his pleas for revisions, until finally, with no premiere in sight and the mysterious disappearance from rehearsals of Sophie Cruvelli who was to sing Hélène, he was forced to write to the Opera's director, Louis Crosnier: "To avoid the catastrophe that menaces us ... I see but one means and I do not hesitate to propose it: dissolution of the contract". However, with Cruvelli's re-appearance, Verdi persevered for over six months until the opera was finally given its premiere in June 1855, by then having spent close to two years in Paris working on the opera.

Cruvelli reappeared as miraculously as she had gone, and on 13 November she sang Les Huguenots: at first there was some hissing, but she rapidly won over the audience by the power of her performance, and triumphed magnificently with receipts climbing to more than 9,000 francs for her first few appearances. The distraints and threats of fines were forgiven.

The delayed première of Les vêpres Siciliennes, in which she sang Hélène, took place on 13 June 1855 at the Opéra, with Marc Bonnehée and Louis Guéymard. This was her last great triumph on the public stage. Performances continued through the year: Charles Santley, en route to Italy to commence his own studies with Lamperti or Nava, delayed in Paris for a day to hear Cruvelli in the Sicilian Vespers on 31 October 1855. On first hearing her, he had thought her a goddess: now he was somewhat disenchanted.

=== Cruvelli after Les vêpres ===
Crosnier withdrew La nonne sanglante after its eleventh performance on 17 November, saying that 'such filth' would not be tolerated. Wertheimber departed the Opéra to sing outside of Paris and only returned later, after Cruvelli's retirement. Gann has speculated that the closure of Gounod's opera may have been at least partly motivated by prima donna politics.

Meyerbeer maintained steady contact with Cruvelli: he intended the character of Selika, his 'L'Africaine', to be performed by her, and was working on the score during her final season. However, when she withdrew from the stage he set it aside and did not return to it for long afterwards.

== Retirement ==
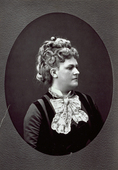
Sophie Cruvelli in 1875. (Collections of Fratelli Alinari Museum & Palazzoli, Florence)

In January 1856 Sophie Cruvelli married Baron Vigier (who later became viscount) and retired from the public stage, at the height of her powers. However she did make further appearances after 1858, mainly in splendid Benefit concerts at her winter residence, the Villa Vigier in Nice, where for many years she drew together the international high-society of the Second Empire in her Salon, the 'Cercle de la Méditerranée'. These concerts included an annual performance of Norma, the proceeds of which were given to the poor. This was the reason why, in 1874, Pope Pius IX awarded to her, the papal Golden Rose (Rose of Virtue), though she was a lifelong confirmed Protestant. At one such charity concert in 1881 she became indisposed, and Emma Calvé stepped in and sang in her place, giving her first public performance.

In 1881 in Nice, Cruvelli organised the first performance of Richard Wagner's opera Lohengrin in France, and herself sang the role of Elsa. It was a bold and sumptuous presentation, and took place in the context of a benefit performance.

She remained a figure of public importance into her later life, and was presented to H.M. Queen Victoria (at whose invitation she had sung in 1851, 1852 and 1854) once more in 1895. After a visit to the Opera House in Monaco (then newly set up under Raoul Gunsbourg), Sophie Cruvelli died aged 81 on 6 November 1907 in the Hotel de Paris in Monte Carlo. Her grave memorial is in the Père Lachaise cemetery in Paris.
