= Florinda, Florida =

Historical US place

Florinda was a named place in Florida in 1930. A rail line connected 26.6 miles from Lake Wales through Grove, Florida, Templeton, Florida, Hesperides, Florida, Walinwa, Florida, Sumica, Florida, and Florinda, Florida to Nalaca, Florida. The area took its name from the Florinda Mill & Planing Mill Co. The area's post office was established at Sumica. In 1922 the Florinda company budgeted $100,000 for new sawmill equipment including planers, saws, and matchers for a daily output of about 35,000 ft. The purchase replaced equipment destroyed in a fire.
