= 1986 Hawthorn Football Club season =

62nd season in the Victorian Football League

Hawthorn Football Club
1986 season
- President: Ron Cook
- Coach: Allan Jeans
- Captain: Michael Tuck
- Home ground: Princes Park
- VFL season: 18–4 (1st)
- Finals series: Premiers (Defeated Carlton 110–68)
- Best and Fairest: Gary Ayres
- Leading goalkicker: Jason Dunstall (77)
- Highest home attendance: 68,339 (Preliminary final vs. Fitzroy)
- Lowest home attendance: 6,579 (Round 15 vs. St Kilda)
- Average home attendance: 25,552

The 1986 season was the Hawthorn Football Club's 62nd season in the Victorian Football League and 85th overall.

== Fixture ==
=== Premiership season ===
Rd	Date and local time	Opponent	Scores (Hawthorn's scores indicated in bold)			Venue	Attendance	Record
Rd	Date and local time	Opponent	Home	Away	Result	Venue	Attendance	Record
1	Monday, 31 March (2:10 pm)	Carlton	**17.11 (113)**	11.11 (77)	Won by 36 points	VFL Park (H)	48,107	1–0
2	Friday, 4 April (7:40 pm)	North Melbourne	16.12 (108)	**17.9 (111)**	Won by 3 points	Melbourne Cricket Ground (A)	26,456	2–0
3	Saturday, 12 April (2:10 pm)	Richmond	**22.22 (154)**	15.9 (99)	Won by 55 points	Princes Park (H)	11,349	3–0
4	Saturday, 19 April (2:10 pm)	St Kilda	17.14 (116)	**19.14 (128)**	Won by 12 points	Moorabbin Oval (A)	11,670	4–0
5	Saturday, 26 April (2:10 pm)	Fitzroy	13.26 (104)	**13.12 (90)**	Lost by 14 points	Victoria Park (A)	13,311	4–1
6	Saturday, 3 May (2:10 pm)	Essendon	**19.12 (126)**	15.12 (102)	Won by 24 points	VFL Park (H)	38,381	5–1
7	Saturday, 10 May (2:10 pm)	Sydney	**18.25 (133)**	15.10 (100)	Won by 33 points	Princes Park (H)	19,300	6–1
8	Saturday, 17 May (2:10 pm)	Collingwood	8.11 (59)	**15.14 (104)**	Won by 45 points	VFL Park (A)	26,032	7–1
9	Sunday, 25 May (2:10 pm)	Geelong	12.14 (86)	**19.5 (119)**	Won by 33 points	Kardinia Park (A)	21,646	8–1
10	Saturday, 31 May (2:10 pm)	Footscray	**11.13 (79)**	16.12 (108)	Lost by 29 points	Princes Park (H)	15,846	8–2
11	Saturday, 7 June (2:10 pm)	Melbourne	**21.19 (145)**	9.6 (60)	Won by 85 points	Princes Park (H)	10,903	9–2
12	Sunday, 15 June (2:10 pm)	Carlton	16.14 (110)	**19.19 (133)**	Won by 23 points	Melbourne Cricket Ground (A)	57,634	10–2
13	Saturday, 21 June (2:10 pm)	North Melbourne	**21.26 (152)**	13.14 (92)	Won by 60 points	Princes Park (H)	14,578	11–2
14	Saturday, 28 June (2:10 pm)	Richmond	11.8 (74)	**26.19 (175)**	Won by 101 points	Melbourne Cricket Ground (A)	20,264	12–2
15	Saturday, 5 July (2:10 pm)	St Kilda	**8.11 (59)**	5.8 (38)	Won by 21 points	Princes Park (H)	6,979	13–2
16	Saturday, 12 July (2:10 pm)	Melbourne	6.14 (50)	**17.15 (117)**	Won by 67 points	VFL Park (A)	10,272	14–2
17	Saturday, 26 July (2:10 pm)	Fitzroy	**6.9 (45)**	14.12 (96)	Lost by 51 points	Princes Park (H)	9,886	14–3
18	Saturday, 2 August (2:10 pm)	Essendon	21.11 (137)	**6.14 (50)**	Lost by 87 points	Windy Hill (A)	21,223	14–4
19	Sunday, 10 August (2:10 pm)	Sydney	10.13 (73)	**27.9 (171)**	Won by 98 points	Sydney Cricket Ground (A)	39,763	15–4
20	Saturday, 16 August (2:10 pm)	Collingwood	**20.24 (144)**	10.12 (72)	Won by 72 points	Princes Park (H)	16,529	16–4
21	Saturday, 23 August (2:10 pm)	Geelong	**35.15 (225)**	13.12 (90)	Won by 135 points	Princes Park (H)	9,659	17–4
22	Saturday, 30 August (2:10 pm)	Footscray	7.13 (55)	**19.11 (125)**	Won by 70 points	Western Oval (A)	15,196	18–4

=== Finals series ===
Rd	Date and local time	Opponent	Scores (Hawthorn's scores indicated in bold)			Venue	Attendance
Rd	Date and local time	Opponent	Home	Away	Result	Venue	Attendance
2nd semi-final	Saturday, 13 September (2:30 pm)	Carlton	**13.6 (84)**	16.16 (112)	Lost by 28 points	VFL Park (H)	62,315
Preliminary final	Saturday, 20 September (2:30 pm)	Fitzroy	**16.14 (110)**	7.12 (54)	Won by 56 points	VFL Park (H)	68,339
Grand Final	Saturday, 27 September (2:50 pm)	Carlton	9.14 (68)	**16.14 (110)**	Won by 42 points	Melbourne Cricket Ground (A)	101,861

== Ladder ==
(P)	Premiers
	Qualified for finals

#	Team	P	W	L	D	PF	PA	%	Pts
1	Hawthorn (P)	22	18	4	0	2698	1906	141.6	72
2	Sydney	22	16	6	0	2470	2087	118.4	64
3	Carlton	22	15	7	0	2566	1809	141.8	60
4	Fitzroy	22	13	9	0	2068	2063	100.2	52
5	Essendon	22	12	10	0	2379	1978	120.3	48
6	Collingwood	22	12	10	0	2261	2070	109.2	48
7	North Melbourne	22	12	10	0	2324	2356	98.6	48
8	Footscray	22	11	11	0	1963	2010	97.7	44
9	Geelong	22	7	15	0	2133	2599	82.1	28
10	Richmond	22	7	15	0	2151	2745	78.4	28
11	Melbourne	22	7	15	0	2003	2673	74.9	28
12	St Kilda	22	2	20	0	1846	2566	71.9	8

Rules for classification: 1. premiership points; 2. percentage; 3. points for
Average score: 101.8
Source: AFL Tables
