= Sumica, Florida =

Ghost town in Polk County, Florida, United States

Coordinates: 27.858079°N 81.374798°W

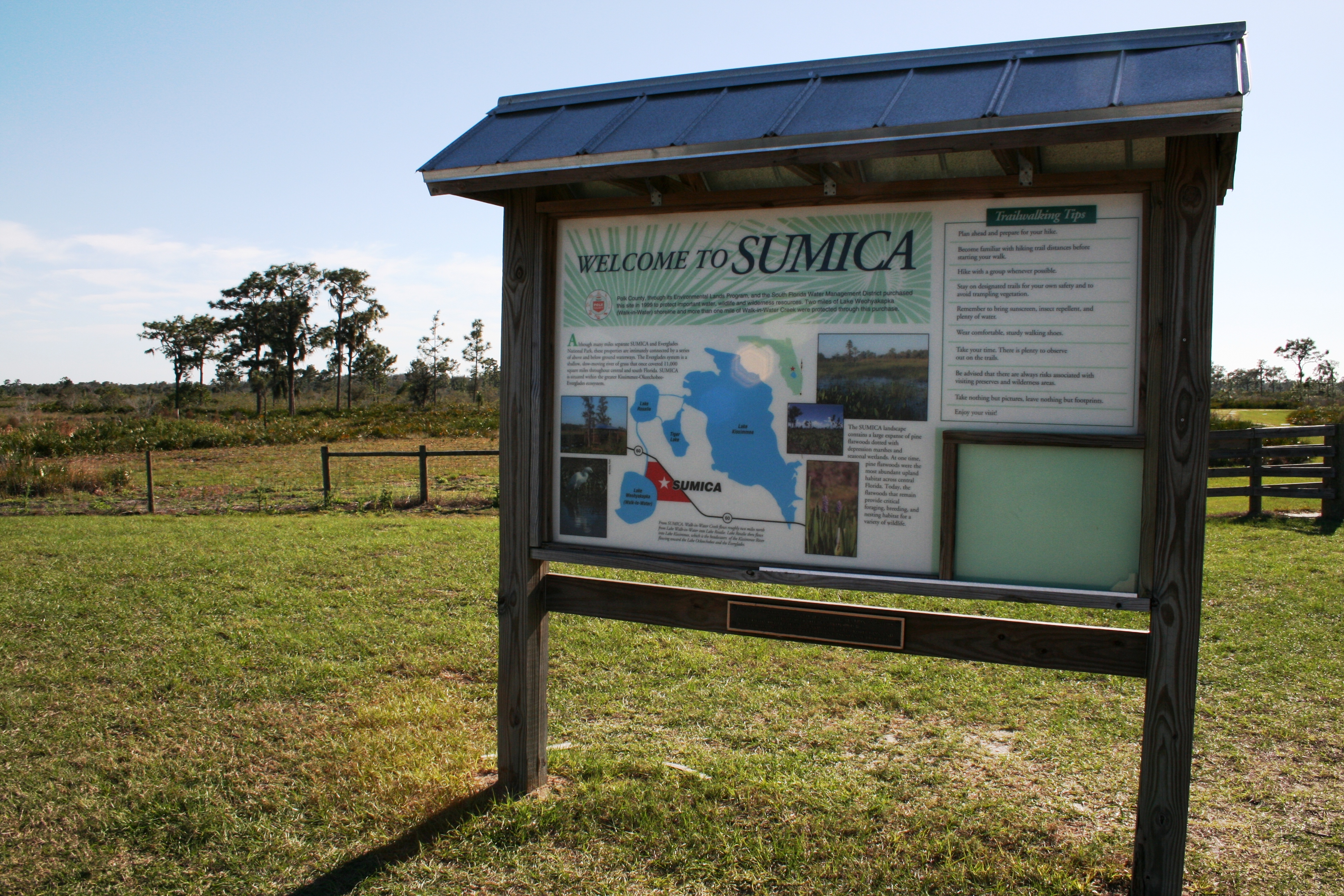
Sign for SUMICA, February 2008

Sumica, alternatively written as SUMICA, was a mill town in Polk County, Florida, United States. The ghost town is commemorated by a historical marker off S.R. 60. There is also a Southwest Florida Water Management District preserve in the area named for the former logging settlement and mill town. Goods from a company store in the town could be purchased with company issued currency, including 25 cent and 5 cent scrip.

Sumica was developed to exploit the long leaf pine and slash pine forests in the area. Sumica had rail built to bring timber to its mill and was connected by rail lines to turpentine factories. The railway connected to a Seaboard Airline Railway branch line.

"Sumica" is an acronym for the French company Société Universelle des Mines, Industrie Commerce et Agriculture. The company built the town's sawmill and turpentine plant. A Sumica post office was opened on March 19, 1917. Sumica included 50 houses, a commissary, church, and school. The Kissimmee River Railway, a branch line of the Seaboard Airline Railway served the area with service to Walinwa on Lake Weohyakapka and Nalaca in Highlands County. The area was deforested by 1927 and abandoned. Some foundation ruins remain in the area. A hiking trail is located in the area.
