= Franz Peter Kymli =

German painter active in France

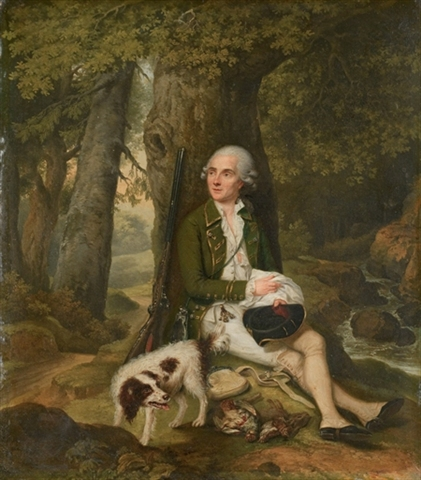
A Hunter, Resting by the River

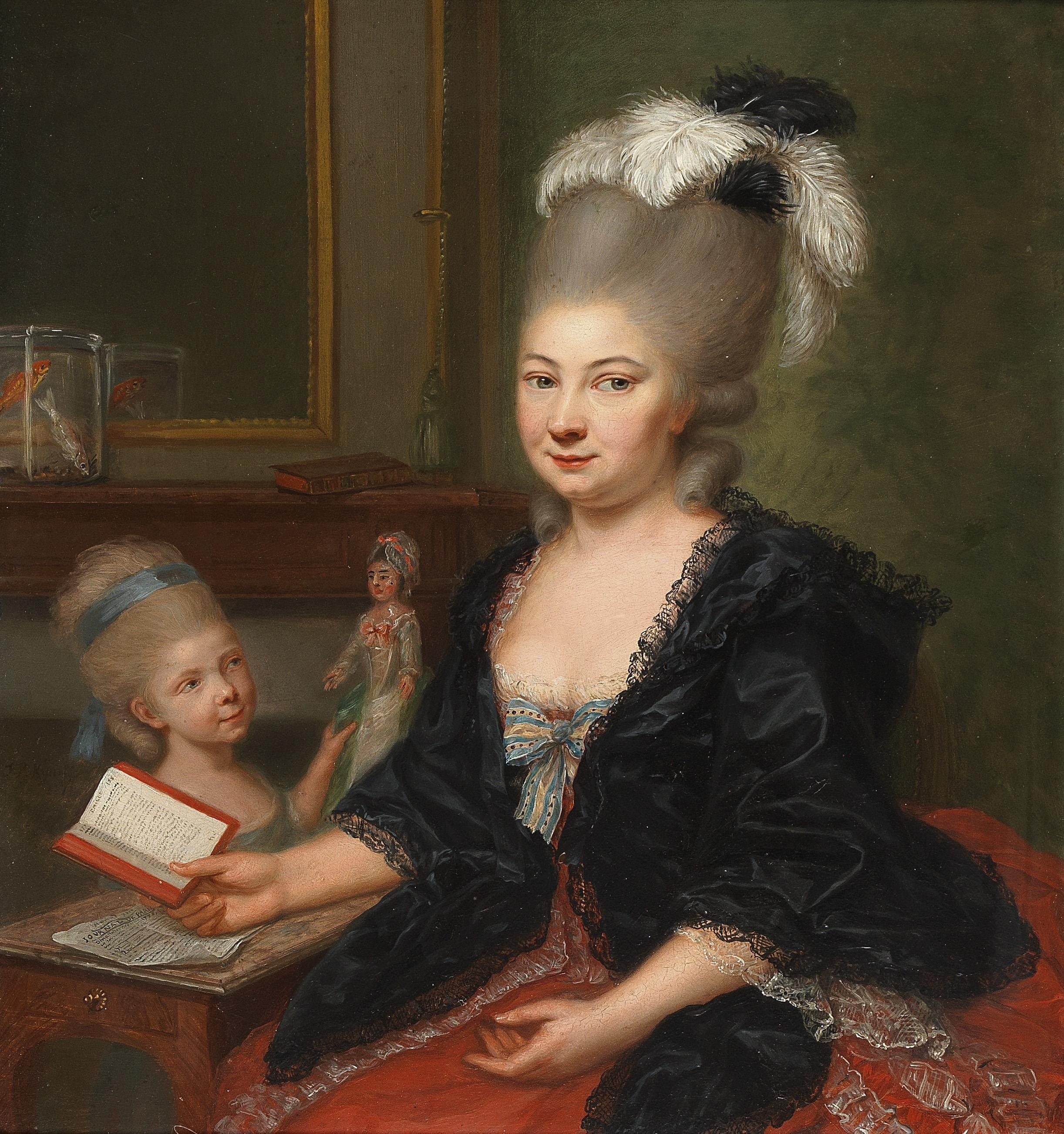
Woman and Child

Franz Peter Joseph Kymli (1745/48, Germany - c.1813, Paris) was a painter and portrait miniaturist from Germany, who worked in France. His name is also given as Kimly, Kimli, Kumli, Kimlig, Kemli, and Kümlich

== Life and work ==
The place most often cited for his birth is Mannheim, due to his attendance at the Mannheimer Zeichnungsakademie, where he was awarded a gold medal in 1772. Three years later, Charles Theodore, the future Elector of Bavaria, granted him a scholarship to continue his studies in Paris. There, he was placed under the protection of his fellow German, the engraver Johann Georg Wille He would eventually become the Elector's court painter, and was responsible for purchasing paintings for his Mannheim gallery.

In 1776, he exhibited at the short-lived "Salon du Colisée". From 1781 to 1787, he participated in the "Salon de la Correspondance", a permanent exhibition for artists who were not members of the Académie Royale. The name of "Mr. Kymli, painter of the Palatine court, rue des Grands Augustins", with the description of the paintings he exhibited, appears in several issues of the magazine News of the Republic of Letters and Arts. He exhibited more than seventy works altogether; mostly portraits with a few genre scenes.

Emperor Joseph II paid a visit to France in 1777, and Kymli painted his portrait, which was produced and distributed as an engraving. His portrait of Pierre Pomme, a doctor from Arles, was engraved by Jean-Charles Le Vasseur and served as the frontispiece for Pomme's work, Traité des affections vaporeuses des deux sexes ou maladies nerveuses vulgairement appelées maux de nerfs, published in Paris in 1782.

From 1789 to 1791, he was a legation advisor to Karl von Sickingen, a chemist who was serving as Ambassador from the Bavarian court.

In 1799 The new Elector, Maximilian I, dismissed him and stripped him of his titles. He remained in Paris, continued to paint, and took several students; including the engraver, Johann Friedrich Müller, and the miniaturist, Charles Guillaume Alexandre Bourgeois.

In February 1813, his art collection was sold at auction. This is generally taken to mean he had died then, or late in 1812.

Some of his works may be seen at the Stadtmuseum Landeshauptstadt Düsseldorf, the Musée d'Art et d'Histoire de Langres, the Reiss-Engelhorn-Museen in Mannheim, the Herzog Anton Ulrich Museum in Braunschweig, and the Nationalmuseum in Stockholm.
