= Apollonia Seydelmann =

German-Italian miniature artist (d. 1840)

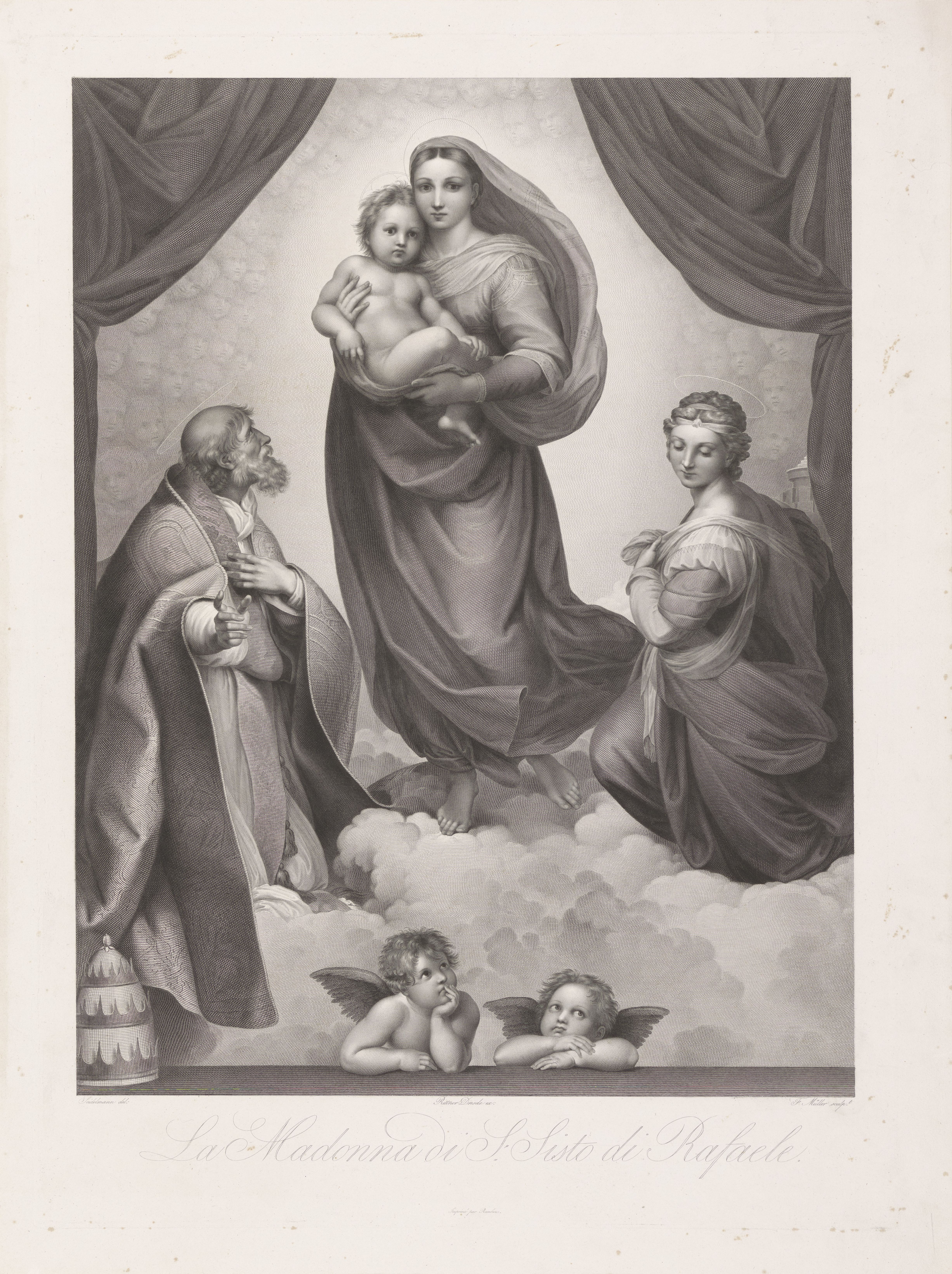
The Sistine Madonna, after Raphael. Engraved by Johann Friedrich Müller, from a drawing by Seydelmann

Apollonia Seydelmann, née De Forgue (17 June 1767/68, Venice or Trieste - 27 June 1840, Dresden) was a German-Italian miniaturist.

== Life and work ==
She was the daughter of a French landowner and an Italian woman named Teresa Tomasini. After her father's death, her mother married the poet Caterino Mazzolà. In 1780, he was appointed Court Poet in Dresden. There, at the age of sixteen, she married the painter Jakob Seydelmann. Under his tutelage, she also became a painter. They had one daughter.

In 1790, they travelled to Italy, where she took lessons in miniature painting from Therese Concordia Maron, the sister of Anton Raphael Mengs, who had been her husband's teacher. When they returned home, she had already earned recognition for her sepia drawings and was accepted into the Dresden Academy, with a pension of 200 Thalers. In 1820, she was named an honorary member of the Accademia di San Luca.

Her drawing of the Sistine Madonna, after the work by Raphael, was made into a famous engraving by Johann Friedrich Müller, an artist in Stuttgart. It was said that he was not fully satisfied with her rendition of the painting, and travelled throughout Italy, studying Raphael's works first hand.

In Dresden, she also ran a small salon, which was frequented by foreign and local artistic notables.
