= Walinwa =

Location in Florida, United States

Walinwa was a community by Lake Weohyakapka, Florida. The lake's name is translated as walk-in-water, and the settlement's name is a condensed form of those English words. Turpentine was produced in the area.

In 1910, a Seaboard Air Line Railroad connection was built to the town. In 1918, the community was also served by the Kissimmee River Railway, a steam rail line in Polk County, Florida stretching 7.26 miles from Walinwa to Nalaca in an area that developed with logging, sawmill, and turpentine industries. A Seaboard subsidiary it ran from Walinwa to Nalaca. The rail line extended from the Seaboard branch line connecting Plant City and Walinwa. It also served the logging and mill town of Sumica and the turpentine settlement of Nalaka, Florida.

Kissimmee River Railway was incorporated December 3, 1917. It was operated by the United States Railroad Administration. The turpentine town is mentioned glancingly in a historical marker for SUMICA.
