= Johann Friedrich Müller =

German engraver (1782–1816)

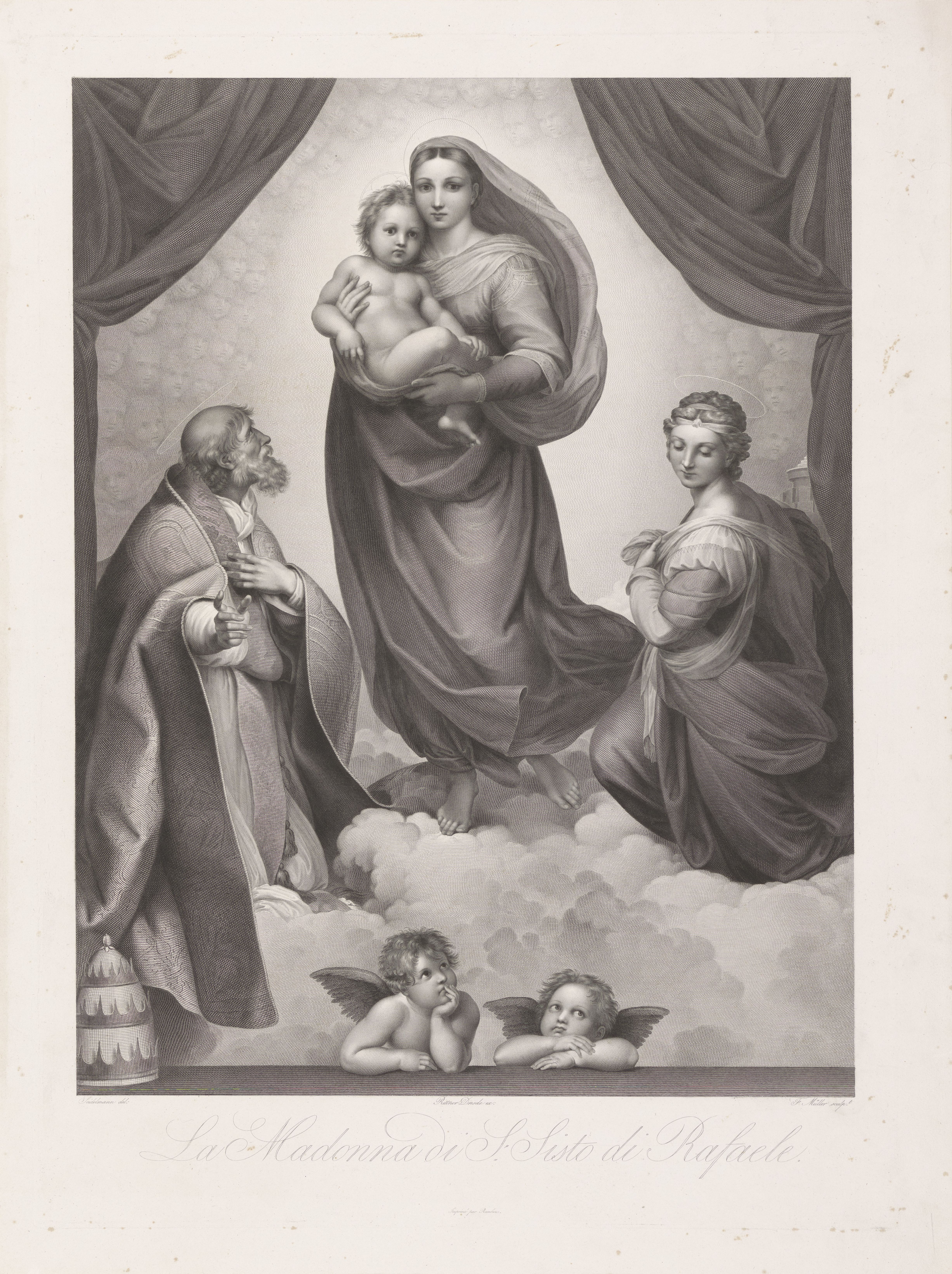
Müller's engraving of Raphael's Sistine Madonna; from a drawing by Apollonia Seydelmann

Johann Friedrich Wilhelm Müller (11 December 1782, Stuttgart – 3 May 1816, Pirna) was a German copperplate engraver.

== Biography ==
He was the eldest son of the copperplate engraver, Johann Gotthard von Müller, and his second wife Rosine née Schott. An early case of smallpox left him with a weak constitution. He initially pursued a scientific education but, before finishing school, decided to become an engraver as well. Trained by his father, he produced his first works in 1798. He also received professional advice from family friends; notably Johann Heinrich von Dannecker

His final studies in Paris were interrupted by another period of illness. There, in addition to engraving, he studied oil painting with Franz Peter Kymli.

He returned to Stuttgart in 1804. Shortly after, he received a commission from an art dealer in Dresden to create an engraving of the Sistine Madonna, by Raphael. It was to be based on a drawing by Apollonia Seydelmann, a local Dresden artist. Apparently, he was not fully satisfied with her rendition of the work, and travelled to Italy to study Raphael's paintings in person. He was there until 1809.

Back in Stuttgart, he focused on the Madonna and portraits. In 1811, he married Henriette Rapp, a niece of the merchant and art collector, Gottlob Heinrich von Rapp. He had met her while she was living with the Danneckers; distant relatives who put her through school. Their son, Karl Friedrich Johann, became a well-known painter.

In 1814, probably due to his work on the Madonna, he was named a professor at the Dresden Academy of Fine Arts. The Madonna was completed in 1815. Shortly after, he began to suffer from religious delusions and ate very little. His condition may have been worsened by the political situation, which made it difficult to find work. Eventually, he became seriously ill, was taken to a mental hospital, and placed in the care of Dr. Ernst Gottlob Pienitz. He died from jumping out of a window. Whether it was an attempt to escape, or suicide, is unknown.
