= Karl Friedrich Johann von Müller =

German painter (1813-1881)

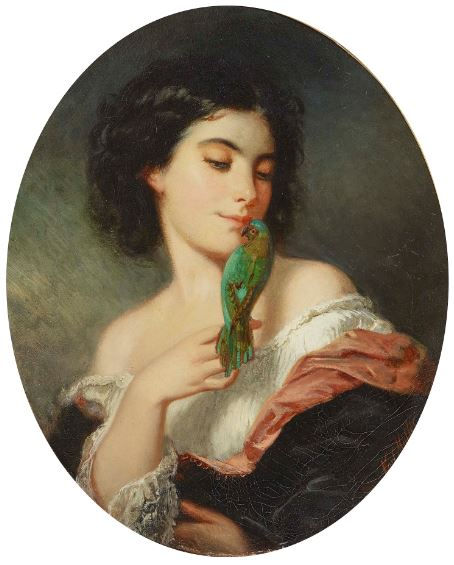
Young Woman with a Parrot

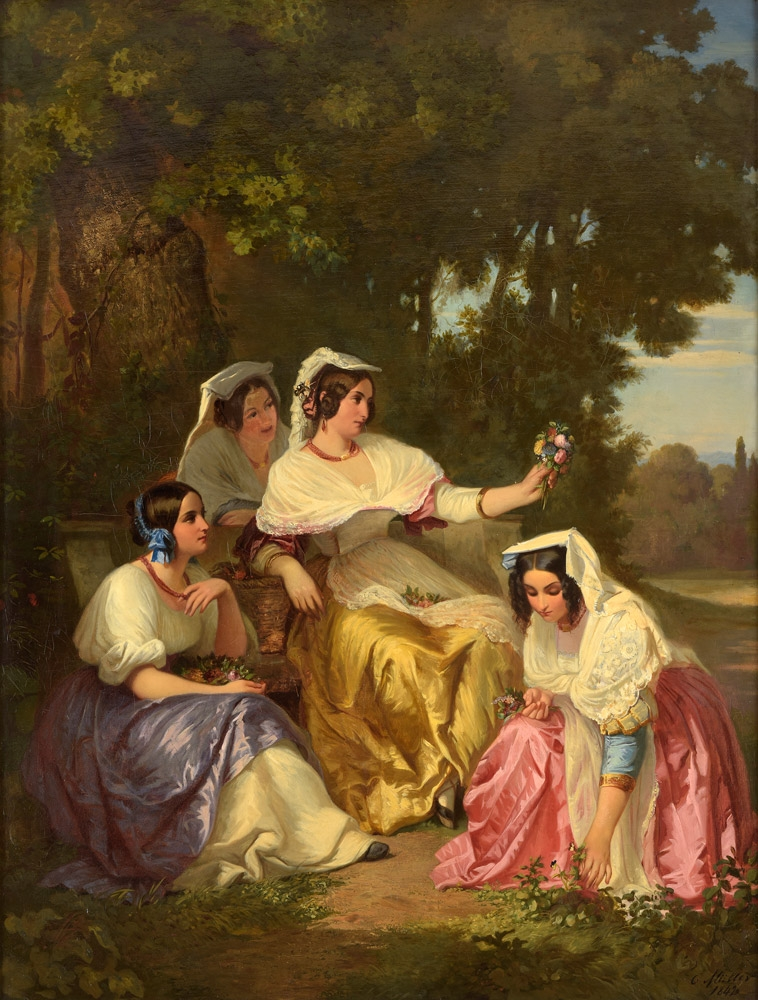
Four Sisters in the Park

Karl Friedrich Johann von Müller (2 October 1813, Stuttgart – 27 April 1881, Frankfurt am Main) was a German painter, known for his portraits of women.

== Biography ==
von Müller was born in 1813 in the Kingdom of Württemberg. His father was the copper engraver Johann Friedrich Müller, who died when he was only three. Shortly after, his family moved to Dresden, in the Kingdom of Saxony, where they lived with his grandfather, Johann Gotthard von Müller, who was also an engraver. In 1822 his mother remarried, to a pastor from Stuttgart, but died the following year.

During that time, he had been placed in the home of a teacher at the Latin school, but returned to his grandfather's home after his mother's death and was given drawing lessons. When they were completed, he studied painting with Johann Friedrich Dieterich at the State Academy of Fine Arts Stuttgart.

In 1831, after his grandfather's death, he moved to Munich, Kingdom of Bavaria, to attend the Academy of Fine Arts, where he studied with Peter von Cornelius and majored in history painting, but left without completing his studies. After a short stay in Stuttgart, he went to Paris in 1833 to become a student of Jean-Auguste-Dominique Ingres. Four years later, when Ingres was appointed Director of the French Academy in Rome, Müller followed him and stayed for eleven years. It was there that he created his best known works. He left Italy during the Revolutions of 1848, briefly returned to Stuttgart, spent two years in Frankfurt, then settled in Paris.

In 1855, he married Emma Friederika Stumm (born 1834), who was originally from Neunkirchen. Together, they built a house in Paris, which became a popular meeting place for their fellow German expatriates. At this time, he switched from painting contemporary scenes to depicting episodes from mythology. These were judged to be less original. He also continued to produce portraits, which proved to be more popular.

He left Paris and moved to Frankfurt in 1867. Three years later, the Franco-Prussian War severed his remaining ties to Paris. In 1877, he donated numerous hand drawings by his father and grandfather to the "Royal Engraving Cabinet" at the Staatsgalerie Stuttgart. In return, he was raised to the nobility. In 1878, he donated his last oil painting, Faust and Helen, to a new gallery at the Schloss Rosenstein.
