= VFL Park Superboard =

Scoreboard at Waverley Park in Melbourne, Victoria, Australia

- The Superboard in use during the 1980s

General information
- Status: Demolished
- Type: Scoreboard
- Location: Waverley Park, Mulgrave, Melbourne, Victoria, Australia
- Coordinates: 37.9255°S 145.1897°E
- Opened: 17 February 1982
- Closed: 27 August 2000
- Demolished: c. December 2002

The Superboard was the main scoreboard inside Waverley Park (also known as VFL Park), an Australian rules football stadium located in the south-east Melbourne suburb of Mulgrave. It was installed by the Victorian Football League (VFL) – later renamed to the Australian Football League (AFL) – in 1982, remaining in use until the end of 2000. It was removed and believed to be destroyed when the stadium was largely demolished in 2002.

Known for its "V" shape with a blue football on top and its sepia-coloured monochrome video screen, the Superboard was considered revolutionary for its time because of the ability to show live simulcasts of play and instant replays during matches. It is considered one of the most iconic and infamous elements of Waverley Park, which is no longer used for AFL matches and now only features a main grandstand and oval.

== History ==
=== Original scoreboard ===
VFL Park opened on 18 April 1970, hosting its first VFL match between Fitzroy and Geelong in round 3 of the 1970 season. Prior to the installation of the Superboard, the main scoreboard at VFL Park was located in the north-east corner of the ground. It had the ability to display scores during matches; in addition to Australian rules football, it was used to display cricket scores during World Series Cricket (WSC) matches. This was the first electronic scoreboard at a football ground in Melbourne; another would not be installed until Gillon Oval introduced one in 1976.

Speaking to Scoreboard Pressure in 2020, former electronics trade apprentice Lawrence Elkin recounted that he "worked for a company called Astronetics that built the original light bulb scoreboard at Waverley Park" and he recalled "building the scoreboard in panels that were delivered and then erected on site". During every match, a technician from Astronetics oversaw the operation of the scoreboard in the event of technical problems. Astronetics was placed into liquidation in May 1983.

The original scoreboard was featured on the cover of an album released by Brian May and the ABC Melbourne Showband in 1977.

=== Superboard ===
The first scoreboard at VFL Park, which was replaced by the Superboard in 1982

On 18 February 1981, VFL president Allen Aylett announced that a new scoreboard (known as the VFL Park Superboard) would be installed at the stadium. Aylett said the scoreboard would be the "second largest anywhere in the world" – second only to the video screen at the Sha Tin Racecourse in Hong Kong – at 91.37 metres (299.8 ft) long, with the screen itself measuring at 13.7 metres (45 ft) long and 6.4 metres (21 ft) high. The Superboard would have the ability to display close-up video replays of the matches in progress, scores, statistics, player information, live reports from other venues and pre-match and half-time entertainment.

The VFL produced a marketing video for the Superboard to entice potential advertisers, describing it as "an opportunity to be totally identified with a concept destined to remain a landmark in Melbourne, and indeed Australia, for many years to come". The video was set to the theme from the 1978 film Superman and declared that the VFL was the "only truly consistent supersports organisation in Australia".

While Aylett had announced that the Superboard would be installed by July 1981, it took another seven months for it to be operational and was first used during a practice match between Essendon and Fitzroy on 27 February 1982. Although it suffered some initial technical problems (including displaying the names of two players who were not playing), the Superboard was able to show detailed player statistics, including height, weight, age, number of games played and when they had joined the club, in addition to "on-the-spot match details".

It cost A$2.3 million to install the Superboard, which was built by a company in Chicago. The cost of the screen was covered by sponsorship agreements with seven national companies (BP Australia, Coca-Cola Bottlers, Sanyo Australia, Trans Australia Airlines, W.D. & H.O. Wills, General Motors-Holden and ANZ Bank) that lasted until 1991.

While the Superboard was considered revolutionary at the time of its installation, it soon gained a reputation for appearing outdated. In March 1982, the Melbourne Cricket Ground (MCG) installed a Diamond Vision screen – the fifth in the world at the time – which, while smaller than the screen at VFL Park, was the first video screen in Australia to display full colour pictures. This was in contrast to the Superboard, which had a sepia-coloured monochrome video screen. In 1992, the MCG replaced its Diamond Vision screen with a new scoreboard that was 40% larger and five times brighter.

Approximately 40,000 different 40-watt light bulbs – which regularly broke during matches – were used to display the video picture. Peter Erb, who ran the scoreboard from 1992 until 2000, told the Herald Sun in 2016 that it was "hit and miss" as to whether or not it would work during a match, saying it "would have been kept going for a lot more years than it should have been" and was "well past its use-by date" by the mid-1990s.

Waverley Park hosted its final AFL match in 1999, with the last competitive senior football match (the 2000 VFL Grand Final) played at the venue on 27 August 2000. After this, Waverley Park was not maintained, with vandals breaking into the site and damaging the facilities. Only the Sir Kenneth Luke Stand and the members' stand mural were listed on the Victorian Heritage Register, with the stadium demolished starting on 11 December 2002. The Superboard was one of the last elements to be removed of the ground, with bulldozers first flattening the outer lower stands located around the scoreboard. No elements of the Superboard were believed to have been saved; Erb said "it all went to the tip" and he did not keep any souvenirs.

== Legacy ==
In 2014, an art installation titled "Instant Replay" was created by Avni Dauti, which was shaped like a "V" in the same way that the Superboard was. The installation was described as being "reconstituted through constructed sculptures and splicing and the assemblage of archive materials disseminated across the space, interconnect piece-by-piece like the instant replay".
