= Lake Weohyakapka =

Lake in the state of Florida, United States

- Location within Florida
- Location: Polk County, Florida
- Coordinates: 27°49′15″N 81°24′49″W
- Type: lake
- Surface elevation: 59 ft (18 m)

Lake Weohyakapka is a lake in Polk County, Florida, in the United States. The name is derived from the Creek language, most likely meaning "walking on water". The turpentine settlement of Walinwa (Walk In Water) was once located by the lake and was connected to other logging, sawmill, and turpentine industry towns by the Kissimmee River Railway, a Seaboard Air Line Railway subsidiary operated by the then nationalized railroad operator (United States Railroad Administration).

Walk-in-the-Water Wildlife Management Area (WMA) abuts one part of the shore.
