= Proposed Melbourne Football Club headquarters =

Caulfield Racecourse
- Interactive map of Caulfield Racecourse
- Address: Caulfield East, Victoria
- Coordinates: 37.881°S 145.040°E

Construction
- Cost: A$100 million (proposed)

The Caulfield Racecourse Reserve homebase is the proposed training facility and headquarters of the Melbourne Football Club, which would be located within the Caulfield Racecourse Reserve in the suburb of Caulfield East.

Under the proposal, the new facility would include two Australian rules football ovals, two multi-use sports fields and a pavilion. It would be surrounded by the racetrack.

== History ==
=== Background ===
The Melbourne Football Club (MFC) has played its home matches at the Melbourne Cricket Ground (MCG) since 1889. The club trained on the MCG until 1985, when it moved to Junction Oval in St Kilda. In 2009, the club moved its training facilities to Casey Fields to Cranbourne East, and in late 2010 its football offices and indoor training facilities were moved to AAMI Park. The club trains on the Gosch's Paddock public oval adjacent to the MCG.

In June 2018, the MFC proposed establishing its new headquarters next to Jolimont railway station, with a football oval located in Yarra Park. After the Victorian state government said it did not support the proposal, plans were developed for a facility on the southern side of Gosch's Paddock.

Other proposals discussed by the club included a small triangle-shaped piece of land in between Olympic Park Oval and AAMI Park, Melbourne University, Elsternwick Park and Docklands Stadium.

=== Proposed Caulfield site ===
On 12 December 2023, the MFC announced that it had commenced a feasibility study to identify a location for the club's new headquarters within the Caulfield Racecourse Reserve. The study was a partnership between the MFC, the Caulfield Racecourse Reserve Trust (CRRT), and "local community stakeholders". The study was completed in September 2024.

Under the proposal, a tunnel would be built underneath the racetrack.

In 2026, it was reported that the MFC was considering moving its training and administrative department to Waverley Park in Mulgrave on an interim basis, before a planned move to the new Caulfield facility.

== See also ==
- Kennedy Community Centre
