= Sepia (color) =

Shade of brown derived from the common cuttlefish

Color coordinates
- Hex triplet: #704214
- sRGB^{B} (r, g, b): (112, 66, 20)
- HSV (h, s, v): (30°, 82%, 44%)
- CIELCh_{uv} (L, C, h): (33, 45, 38°)
- Source: Maerz and Paul
- ISCC–NBS descriptor: Strong brown
- B: Normalized to [0–255] (byte)

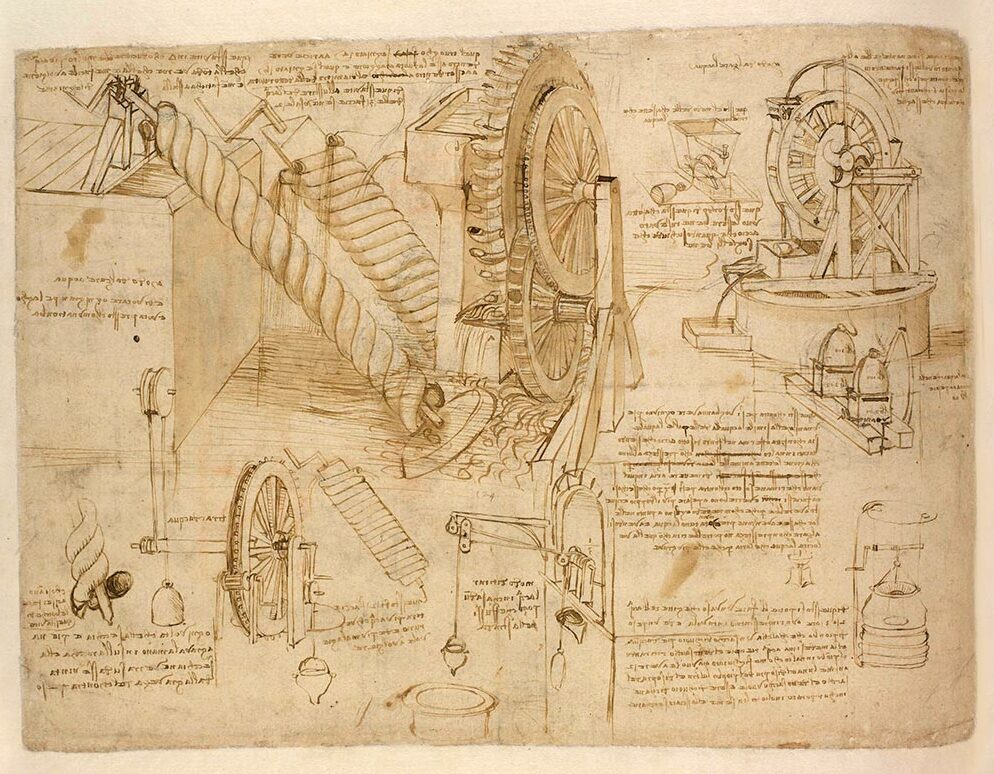
Sepia ink used for writing, drawing and as a colored wash by Leonardo da Vinci

Sepia is a reddish-brown color, named after the rich brown pigment derived from the ink sac of the common cuttlefish Sepia. The word sepia is the Latinized form of the Ancient Greek word σηπία (sēpía), meaning cuttlefish.

== In the visual arts ==
Sepia ink was commonly used for writing in Greco-Roman civilization. It remained in common use as an artist's drawing material until the 19th century. In the last quarter of the 18th century, Professor Jakob Seydelmann of Dresden developed a process to extract and produce a concentrated form of sepia for use in watercolors and oil paints.

Sepia toning is a chemical process used in photography which changes the appearance of black-and-white prints to brown. The color is now often associated with antique photographs. Most photo graphics software programs and many digital cameras include a sepia tone filter to mimic the appearance of sepia-toned prints.

== Other uses ==
In the 1940s in the United States, music intended for African American audiences was generally called race music or sepia music until the development of the expression rhythm and blues (R&B). There was a magazine for African-Americans called Sepia, which existed from 1947 to 1983 (although the name Sepia was only applied after a change of ownership in 1953).

Acclaimed Russian director Andrei Tarkovsky used a sepia tone in his 1979 science-fiction film Stalker to visually distinguish scenes set in the ordinary world from the world of the forbidden Zone, which is portrayed in color.

The now-demolished main scoreboard inside Waverley Park in Melbourne, Australia, was known for its sepia tone on its video screen.

== See also ==
- Cephalopod ink
