= Jakob Seydelmann =

German painter (1750–1829)

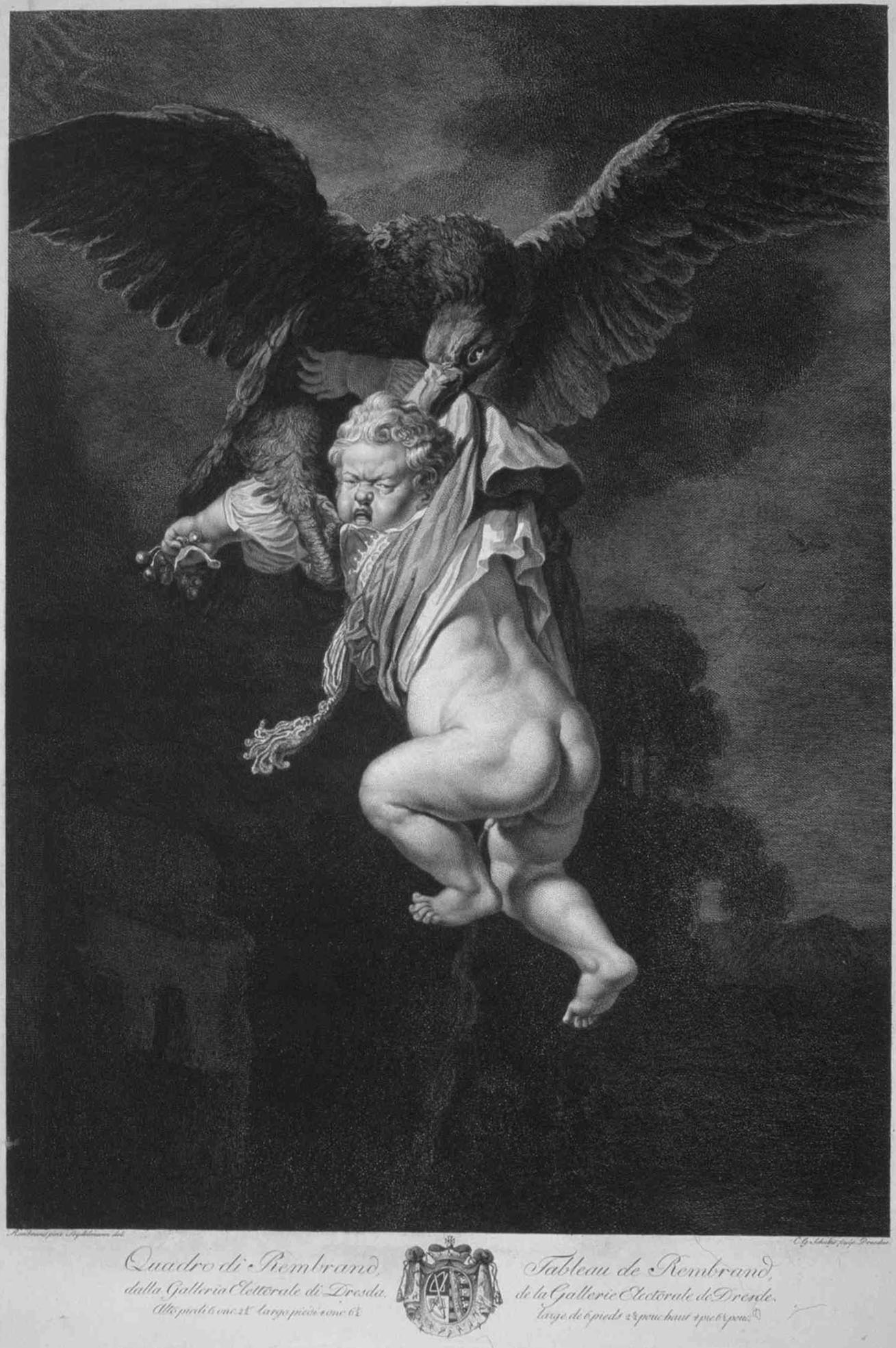
The Rape of Ganymede, after Rembrandt. Engraved by Christian Gottfried Schulze, from a drawing by Seydelmann

Jakob Crescenz Seydelmann, also known as Crescentius Josephus Jacob Seydelmann (26 July 1750, Dresden – 27 March 1829, Dresden) was a German graphic artist and illustrator.

== Life and work ==
His father, Franz Joseph Seydelmann (1713-1785), also known as Francesco Seydelmann, was a chamber singer for the Electorate of Saxony. His older brother, Franz, was a singer and composer.

In Dresden, he studied with Giuseppe Canale and Giovanni Battista Casanova then, from 1772, in Rome with Anton Raphael Mengs. Upon returning home, he became professor of miniature painting at the Academy of Fine Arts. During his career there, he would visit Rome nine more times.

In the late 1700s, he developed a process to extract and produce a concentrated form of sepia for use in watercolors and oil paints. He is mostly known for drawings made with that process. Well-known examples include depictions of the Sistine Madonna and Night, by Correggio, both from the Gemäldegalerie Alte Meister, as were most of his reproductions.

He spent many years on a commission from Tsar Alexander I, copying paintings from Italian artists, in various styles, at their original size. The copies were made for display in the Imperial Collection at the Hermitage Museum.

His wife was Apollonia (née De Forgue). They were married in 1783, when she was only sixteen. Under his tutelage, she also became a well-known artist. He was a member of the Masonic Lodge, Zum Goldenen Apfel, and they were close friends of the painter Gerhard von Kügelgen and his family.
