= Kissimmee River Railway =

Railway in Florida

Kissimmee River Railway was an American single-track standard gauge steam rail line in Polk County, Florida stretching 7.26 miles from Walinwa to Nalaca, in an area that developed with logging, turpentine industries. The rail line extended from the Seaboard Airline Railway branch line. It also served the logging and mill town of Sumica and the turpentine settlement of Nalaka, Florida. Construction was finished in December 1917. It was operated by the United States Railroad Administration.

According to a local historian, railroads in this area were crucial to the towns they passed through.
