= Karl von Sickingen =

Karl Heinrich Joseph Reichsgraf von Sickingen (1737-1791) was a German academic who is known for his work on platinum.

== Biography ==
von Sickingen was born in 1737. He died on July 13, 1791, in Vienna.

The researches of von Sickingen were scientific in nature. He made significant and accurate remarks on platinum, even though it was already acknowledged as a novel material in the 16th century, which is characterised by its large weight, meltability, and unassailability. He played an instrumental role in the discovery on how to convert the metal, which had previously only existed in infusible grains, into cohesive sheet metal.

== Works ==
- Versuche über die Platina. Mit zweien kupfer tafeln
