= Johann Gotthard von Müller =

German line engraver

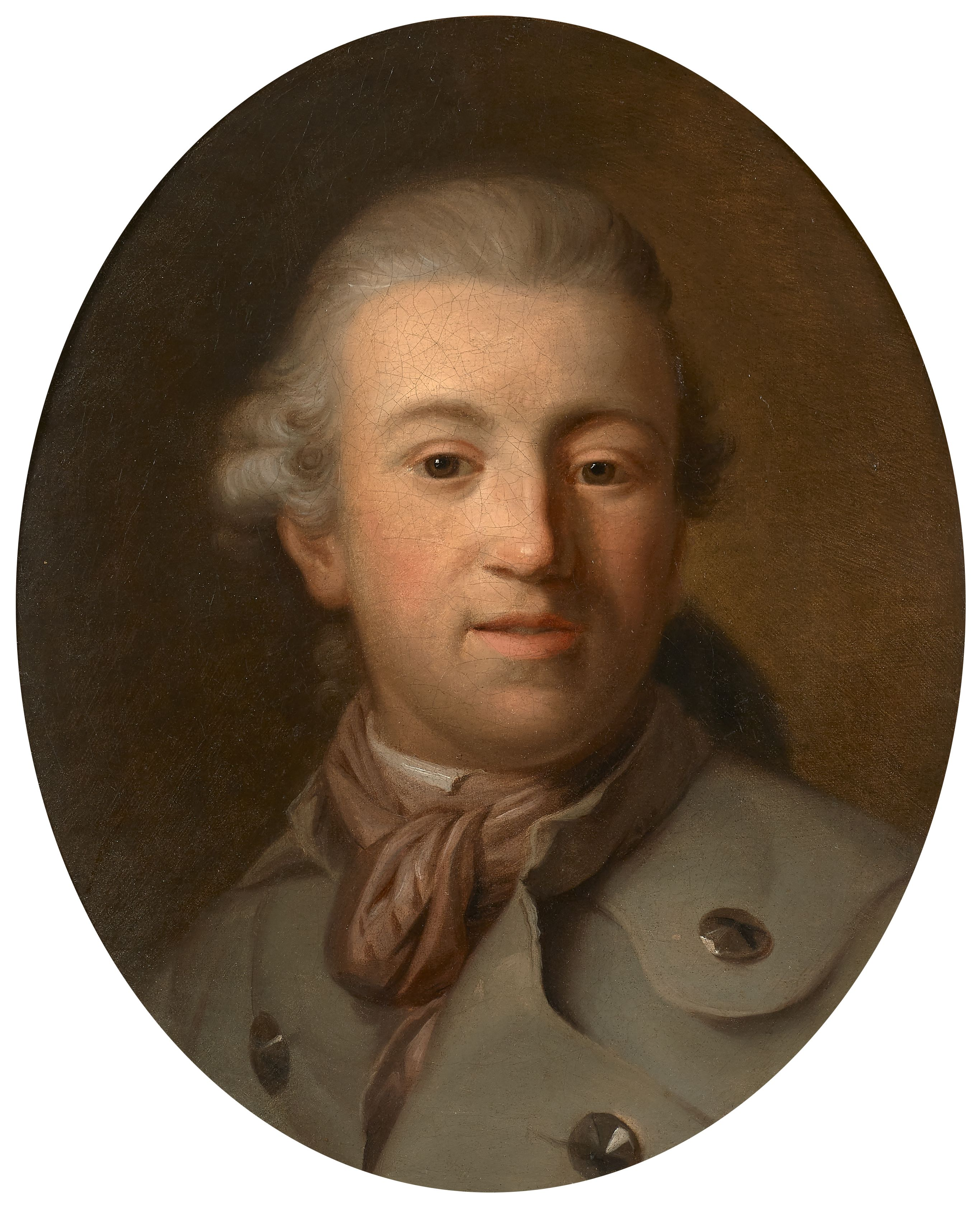
J. G. von Müller, a 1773 portrait of Müller by Johann Friedrich August Tischbein

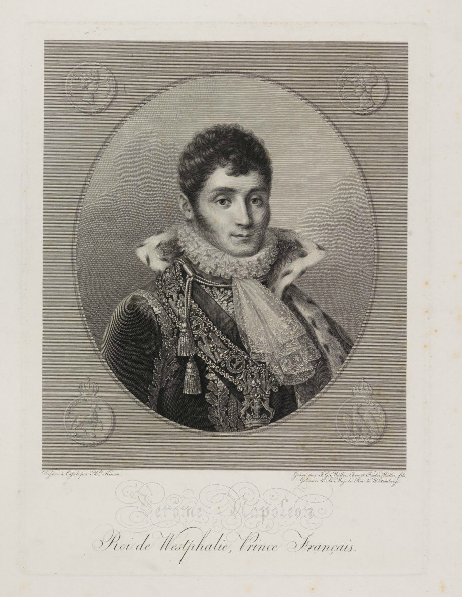
A portrait of Müller by Jérôme Bonaparte

Johann Gotthard von Müller (4 May 1747 in Bernhausen, near Stuttgart – 14 March 1830 in Stuttgart) was a German line engraver.

== Biography ==
He prepared himself for the church, but attended the academy of fine arts as well and studied under the court painter Guibal. Developing a talent for engraving, he went to Paris in 1770, where for six years he studied under Johann Wille. He won a number of prizes there, and was elected a member of the French Academy.

In 1776, Duke Charles recalled him to Stuttgart, where he taught for nine years, and whence he was summoned to Paris to engrave a portrait of Louis XVI, after Joseph Duplessis. Next in importance to this is his engraving of Trumbull's “Battle of Bunker Hill.”

On his return to Stuttgart he became professor of engraving. He was elected a member of the principal European academies, and was knighted in 1818. He engraved thirty-three plates in all, of which, besides those mentioned, the best are: “Madonna della Seggiola,” after Raphael; “Saint Catharine with Two Angels,” after Leonardo da Vinci; “Schiller,” after the portrait by Anton Graff; and “Saint Cecilia,” after Domenichino.

== Personal life ==
He trained his son, Johann Friedrich as a line engraver. Friedrich went to Paris to complete his studies and mostly worked there. He executed engravings of “St. John” and “St. Cecilia” after Domenichino. After preparing in Rome for the engraving of Raphael's “Madonna di San Sisto,” he devoted the remainder of his life to that masterpiece. In 1814 he was appointed professor in the Dresden Academy of Fine Arts, but his health being impaired by overwork, he retired. His works, 18 in number, were noticed favorably.
