= List of compositions by Sigismond Thalberg =

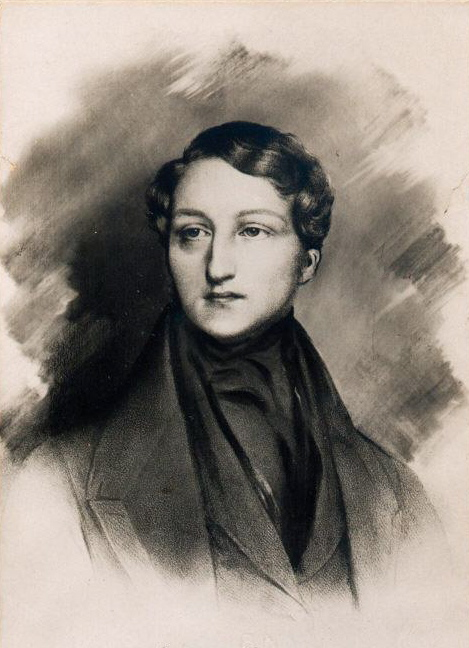
Sigismond Thalberg

Sigismond Thalberg was a virtuoso pianist and prolific composer of the 19th Century. In his time, he was regarded as a pianist equal in footing to the other two great names of the time, Franz Liszt and Frédéric Chopin.

== Works with opus numbers ==
- Op. 1 Fantaisie et Variations sur des différens Motifs de l’opéra Euryanthe de C. M. v. Weber.
- Op. 2 Fantaisie et Variations sur un thême ecossais.
- Op. 3 Impromptu sur des thèmes favoris de l’Opéra Le Siège de Corinth de Rossini.
- Op. 4 Douze Valses.
- Op. 5 Hommage à Rossini, Motifs de l’opéra Guillaume Tell varié.
- Op. 5 Grand concerto pour piano et orchestre.
- Op. 6 Fantaisie pour le Piano-Forte sur des motifs favoris de l’Opéra Robert le Diable de Meyerbeer.
- Op. 7 Grand divertissement pour pianoforte et cor (ou violoncelle), avec accompagnement d´orchestre.
- Op. 8 Sechs Deutsche Lieder, Erstes Heft
  - [1] Ihre Augen: "Du hast Diamanten und Perlen".
  - [2] Der Wanderer: "In Windsgeräusch".
  - [3] Abreise: "Der Mond, der scheinet so bleich".
  - [4] Fröhliches Scheiden: "Gar fröhlich kann ich scheiden".
  - [5] Die Nonne: "Im stillen Klostergarten".
  - [6] Der Reitersmann: "Kaum gedacht, war der Lust ein End gemacht".
- Op. 9 Fantaisie sur des motifs de l’Opéra La Straniera de Bellini.
- Op. 10 Grande Fantaisie et Variations sur un Motif de l’Opéra de V. Bellini I Montecchi et Capuleti.
- Op. 11 Sechs deutsche Lieder, Zweites Heft
  - [7] Lebe wohl: "Schöne Wiege meiner Leiden".
  - [8] Der Strom: "Berg und Burgen schauen herunter".
  - [9] Mitgefühl: "Und wüsstens die Blumen".
  - [10] Hass und Liebe: "Sie haben mich gequälet".
  - [11] Die Thräne: "Was will die einsäme Thräne".
  - [12] Träumen und Wachen: "Ich hatt´im Traum geweinet".
- Op.12 Grande Fantaisie et Variations sur des motifs de l’Opéra Norma de Bellini.
- (Also: Op. 12 Grand duo pour deux pianos sur des motifs de «Norma» de Bellini, with Émile Prudent).
- Op. 13 Sechs deutsche Lieder, Drittes Heft
  - [13] Des Jägers Haus: "Hier andem grünen Walde".
  - [14] Der todte Müller: "Die Sterne über´m Thale".
  - [15] Sprache der Liebe: "Ich hab´es den Blumen gesagt".
  - [16] Ein Kamerad: "Einen guten Kameraden fand ich".
  - [17] Todtengräberlied: "Wie doch so schnell der Mensch vergisst".
  - [18] Im Dunkeln: "Sie haben heute Abend Gesellschaft".
- Op.14 Grande Fantaisie et Variations sur des motifs de l’Opéra Don Juan de Mozart.
- Op.15 Caprice.
- Op.16 Deux Nocturnes.
- Op.17 Deux airs russes variés.
- Op.18 Les Soirées musicales de Rossini: Divertissement sur des motifs favoris de Rossini.
- Op.19 Deuxième caprice.
- Op.20 Fantaisie sur des motifs de l´opéra «Les Huguenots» de Meyerbeer.
- Op.21 Trois Nocturnes.
- Op.22 Grande fantaisie.
- Op.23 Sechs deutsche Lieder, Viertes Heft, Lieder des Einsiedlers
  - [19] Einsiedlers Blumen / Seine Blumen, "Ihr blühet wohl, liebe Blumen".
  - [20] Seine Harfe, "O Harfe! Dir hab´ich frühe".
  - [21] Sein Kreuz, "Sie wanden Dir eine Kron".
  - [22] Seine Glocken, "Oft wenn ich verzag im Kampfe".
  - [23] Sein Grab, "Dies Grab hat mir gegraben".
  - [24] Sein Begräbnis, "Und bin ich dereinst verschieden".
- Op. 24 Sechs deutsche Lieder, Fünftes Heft.
  - [25] Abend: "Lass Kind, lass meinen Weg mich ziehen".
  - [26] Die Ruinen: "Seht ihr, dort oben am Hügel".
  - [27] Thränen, No. 1: "Was ist´s, Vater, was ich versprach".
  - [28] Thränen, No. 2: "Nicht der Thau, Trau und nicht der Regen".
  - [29] Im Herbst: "Ein kalter Todesschauer".
  - [30] Segen der Grossmutter: "Traum der eignen Tage".
- Op. 25 Sechs deutsche Lieder, Sechstes Heft
  - [31] An den Frühling: "Was lockst du mich".
  - [32] Heimlicher Schmerz: "Hast du Schmerzen je getraten".
  - [33] Erwachen: "Ich schlief wohl eine lange Nacht".
  - [34] Stille der Nacht: "Die Sterne blicken trübe".
  - [35] An den Mond: "Wie blickst du feucht und trübe".
  - [36] Der Ring: "Du Ring am meinem Finger".
- Op. 26 Douze Etudes.
- Op. 26a (?) Deux âmes, Mélodie pour piano seul.
- Op. 27 God save the King and Rule Britannia, Grande fantaisie,
- Op. 28 Nocturne.
- Op. 29 Sechs deutsche Lieder, Siebentes Heft
  - [37] Des Jägermädchens Klage: "Jetzt wohl geht auf öden Wegen".
  - [38] Der Traum: "Im Traum sah ich die Geliebte".
  - [39] Der Verlobten: "Wenn deine Hochzeit nahet".
  - [40] Die Unglückliche: "In Deinen schönen Augen".
  - [41] Sommernacht: "Schweigend ruh´ ich hier".
  - [42] Abschied: "In meinem dunkeln Leben".
- Op. 30 Sechs deutsche Lieder, Achtes Heft
  - [43] Nacht: "So schaurig ist die finstere Nacht".
  - [44] Vor meiner Wiege: "Das also, das ist der enge Schrein".
  - [45] Der Findling: "Ich habe keinen Vater".
  - [46] Wanderers Liebesschmerz I: "Es ist für schlimme Augen".
  - [47] Wanderers Liebesschmerz II: "Ob sie meiner wohl gedenkt".
  - [48] Warum?: "Warum sind denn die Rosen so blass".
- Op. 31 Scherzo.
- Op. 32 Andante.
- Op. 33 Fantaisie sur des thèmes de l’opéra Moïse de G. Rossini.
- Op. 34 Divertissement sur un thème de l’opéra de Jules Benedict „The Gipsy’s Warning“.
- Op. 35 Grand nocturne.
- Op. 36 Six morceaux
  - [1] La cadence. Impromptu en forme d´étude.
  - [2] Etude de perfection.
  - [3] "Mi manca la voce" de l´opéra «Moïse» de Rossini.
  - [4] La Romanesca, Fameux air de danse du 16ème siècle.
  - [5] Canzonette italienne, "Felice donzella" de Dessauer.
  - [6] Romance sans paroles.
  - [7] Nocturne, (see also: Op. 51bis).
  - [8] Deuxième romance, (A catalogue entry only, the work has not yet been identified.).
  - [9] Valse, "Pauline" de Charles de Saint Robert.
  - [10] Duo de l´opéra «Der Freischütz» de Weber, (see also: Op. 70b & Op. 70,11).
- Op. 37 Fantaisie sur des motifs de l’Opéra Oberon de C.M. de Weber.
- Op. 38 Romance et Etude.
- Op. 39 Souvenir de Beethoven, Fantaisie.
- Op. 40 Fantaisie sur des motifs de La Donna del Lago.
- Op. 41 Deux Romances sans Paroles
- Op. 42 Grande Fantaisie sur la Sérénade et le Menuet de Don Juan.
- Op. 43 Grand duo concertant pour piano et violon sur des motifs de l´opéra Les Huguenots, with Bériot.
- Op. 44 Andante final de Lucie de Lammermoor varié.
- Op. 45 Thême et Etude.
- Op. 46 Grand Caprice sur des motifs de l’Opéra la Sonnambula.
- Op. 47 Grandes Valses brillantes.
- Op. 48 Grand Caprice sur des motifs de l’opéra Charles VI de Halévy.
- Op. 49 Grand Duo sur des motifs de l'opéra de V. Beatrice di Tenda, piano and violin, with Heinrich Panofka.
- Op. 50 Fantaisie sur l’opéra Lucrezia Borgia de Donizetti
- Op. 51 Grande Fantaisie sur l’opéra Semiramide de Rossini
- Op. 51 bis Nocturne.
- Op. 52 Fantaisie sur des motifs de l’opéra La Muette de Portici.
- Op. 53 Grande fantaisie sur Zampa de F. Herold.
- Op. 54 Grand Duo concertant sur La Sémiramide de Rossini, piano and violin, with Bériot.
- Op. 55 Le Depart, Romance en forme d´Etude.
- Op. 56 Grande sonate.
- Op. 57 Decameron, Dix Morceau pour le Piano servant d´Ecole préparatoire à l´Etude de ses Grandes Compositions.
  - No.1 Fantaisie sur I Puritani.
  - No.2 Fantaisie sur de thèmes de l´Opéra Der Freischütz.
  - No.3 Fantaisie sur Le Pré aux Clercs.
  - No.4 Fantaisie sur Norma.
  - No.5 Fantaisie sur des mélodies de F. Schubert.
  - No.6 Fantaisie sur des motifs de l´Opéra La gazza ladra.
  - No.7 Fantaisie sur l´Opéra Cenerentola de G. Rossini.
  - No.8 Fantaisie sur des motifs d'Anna Bolena.
  - No.9 Caprice sur des thèmes de l´Opéra Le Prophète de G. Meyerbeer.
  - No.10 Airs irlandais variés.
- Op. 58 Grand Caprice sur la marche de l'Apothéose de Berlioz.
- Op. 59 Marche funèbre variée.
- Op. 60 Barcarolle.
- Op. 61 Mélodies styriennes, Grande fantaisie.
- Op. 62 Valse mélodique.
- Op. 63 Grande fantaisie sur le Barbier de Séville, Opéra de Rossini.
- Op. 64 Les capricieuses, Valses pour piano.
- Op. 65 Tarantelle.
- Op. 65 Souvenir de Pesth, Airs hongrois variés.
- Op. 66 Introduction et Variations sur la Barcarolle de l’Opéra L’Elisire d’amore de Donizetti.
- Op. 67 Grande Fantaisie sur des motifs de l’Opéra Don Pasquale de Donizetti.
- Op. 68 La Fille du Régiment, Opéra de Donizetti, Fantaisie.
- Op. 69 Trio pour piano, violon et violoncelle.
- Op. 70 L´art du chant appliqué au piano.
  - Series I
    - [1] Quatuor de l´Opéra: I Puritani de Bellini.
    - [2] Tre giorni, Air de Pergolese.
    - [3] Adelaide de Beethoven.
    - [4] Air d´Église du célèbre chanteur Stradella.
    - [5] Lacrimosa tiré du Requiem de Mozart and Duo des Nocces de Figaro, Opéra de Mozart.
    - [6] Perchè mi guardi e piangi, Duetto de Zelmira, Opéra de Rossini.
  - Series II
    - [7] Bella adorata incognita, Romance de l'Opéra Il Giuramento de Mercadante.
    - [8] Choeur des conjurés de l'Opéra Il crociato de Meyerbeer.
    - [9] Einsam bin ich nicht alleine, de l´Opéra Preciosa de Weber.
    - [10] Le Meunier et le torrent tiré des Chansons de la Meunière de Fr. Schubert.
    - [11] Duet de l´Opéra Der Freischütz de Weber.
    - [12] Il mio tesoro, Air de l´Opéra Don Juan de Mozart.
  - Series III
    - [13] Sérénade de l´Opéra Le barbier de Seville de Rossini.
    - [14] La dove prende, de l´Opéra La flûte enchantée de Mozart.
    - [15] Barcarolle de l´Opéra Gianni di Calais de Donizetti.
    - [16] Trio et Duetto La ci darem la mano, de l´Opéra Don Juan de Mozart.
    - [17] Sérénade de l´Opéra L´amant jaloux de Grétry.
    - [18] Assisa a piè d´un salice, de l´Opéra Otello de Rossini.
  - Series IV
    - [19] Casta diva, Cavatine de Norma de Bellini.
    - [20] Mon coeur soupire, Air du Mariage de Figaro.
    - [21] Quatuor d´Euryanthe de Weber.
    - [22] David sur le rocher blanc, Ancien air de Barde du Pays de Galles.
    - [23] Chanson et Choeur de Jahreszeiten de Haydn.
    - [24] Fenesta vascia, Chanson napolitaine.
- Op. 71 Florinda, Opéra de S. Thalberg, Six Transcriptions.
- Op. 72 Home! Sweet Home!, Air anglais varié.
- Op. 73 The last Rose of Summer, Air irlandais varié.
- Op. 74 Souvenir d'Amerique, Lilly Dale, varié.
- Op. 75 Pensées musicales, Les soirées de Pausilippe, Hommage à Rossini.
- Op. 76 Célèbre Ballade.
- Op. 77 Grande Fantaisie de Concert sur l’Opéra Il Trovatore de Verdi.
- Op. 78 La Traviata, Fantaisie pour piano.
- Op. 79 Trois mélodies de Franz Schubert transcrites, tirées de "Winterreise" et de "Schöne Müllerin"
  - [1] L'Illusion, ("Illusion").
  - [2] La curieuse, ("Die Neugierige").
  - [3] La poste, ("Die Post").
- Op. 79 Romance dramatique.
- Op. 80 La Napolitana.
- Op. 81 Souvenir de Ballo in Mascera de Verdi, Fantaisie.
- Op. 82 Rigoletto, Souvenir pour le piano.
- Op. 83 (?) Air d’Amazily de Fernand Cortez de Spontini, Transcription.

== Operas ==
- Florinda, ou les Maures en Espagne, poem by Eugène Scribe, Italian libretto by Giannone, first performance July 3, 1851, Her Majesty's Theatre, London.
- Cristina di Svezia, poem by Felice Romani, Italian libretto by Giannone, first performance June 3, 1855, Kärntnerthortheater, Vienna.

== Works without opus numbers ==
=== Instrumental ===
- Albumblatt, published in the Leipziger Allgemeine musikalische Zeitung of January 1, 1842.
- Berceuse, piano.
- Graziosa, Romance sans paroles.
- Nocturne, ("Mozart Album").
- Pastorale.
- Romance variée pour le piano, Expressément composée par S. Thalberg pour être publiée avec les nouveaux signes de "La Réforme Musicale" d´Emmanuel Gambale Romance variée pour le piano.
- Romance sans paroles, (2d "Keepsake des pianistes").
- Le petit frère, Romance composée par F. Lablache et varié pour le piano par S. Thalberg.
- Romance pour piano.
- Scherzo from Mendelssohn's "Midsummer Night's Dream," transcribed for solo piano.
- Mélodies anglaises
  - [1] Within the Convent Garden.
  - [2] Mid Stormy Winds.
  - [3] O Joyous Smile.
  - [4] One Alone hath the token.
  - [5] I wept amid my dreaming.
  - [6] Amid the greenwood smiling.
  - [7] The hour of rest.
  - [8] I've sign'd to the rose.
  - [9] With wirth the cottage.
- Irish Airs for piano.
- Scotch Airs for piano.
- Octave study (from: Select Octave Exercises, various contributors).
- Hexameron. Grandes variations de bravoure sur le marche des Puritains de Bellini, Liszt, Thalberg, Pixis, Herz, Czerny, and Chopin, 1st Variation: Thalberg
- Un soupir, Mélodie variée, also called Viola, Mélodie.
- Souvenirs d´Amérique, Valses brillantes, new version of Valse mélodique op.62.
- Souvenirs de Venise, Romance-Étude pour piano.
- Thalberg galoppe.
- La vague, (see Op. 55: Le départ, Rromance en forme d´étude).
- Auf Flügeln des Gesanges, Lied von F. Mendelssohn Bartholdy, Transcription.
- Captain Jinks, variations for piano.
- Lucrezia Borgia, Scène et Choeur du 2.e Acte, Transcription.
- Duo sur Il trovatore de Verdi, piano duet, with Louis Moreaux Gottschalk.
- Le fils du Corse, Mélodie par Auguste Morel, transcrite pour le piano.

=== Vocal ===
- Les soirées aux Tuileries. Douze mélodies allemandes, voice and piano.
  - [1] Le départ de l´étudiant, "Doux berceaux de mon enfance".
  - [2] Le franc archer, "Que la foudre et la tempête".
  - [3] La fiancée trahie, "Hier encore la parjure".
  - [4] La faction du soudard, "J´entends galoper dans la prairie".
  - [5] Les vœux, "Le front couché sur la pierre".
  - [6] Franck, le garde de nuit, "L´horloge sonne quatre heures".
  - [7] Le départ du lansquenet, "Adieu, Kethy ma belle".
  - [8] La ronde du bandoulier, "Libre et fier sur mon coursier".
  - [9] Le fauconnier, "Voici la fraîche aurore".
  - [10] Le page, "Accueille mes vœux châtelaine".
  - [11] Le fossoyeur, "Oh combien l´homme oublie vite".
  - [12] La sérénade, "O toi, qu´en secret j´adore".
- La partenza, melodia per canto con accompagnamento di pianoforte, text: Pietro Metastasio, the music forms the basis for Op. 55: Le départ, Romance en forme d´étude.
- Zwei Gedichte
  - [1] Der Schiffer, "Es fahren die Schiffer".
  - [2] Letzter Besuch, "Ich hab' vor ihr gestanden".
- Die Blonde, ("la bionda") von P. Clarens.
- Larmes d´une jeune fille, Mélodie.
- Mélodie du soir.
- Nimmer, voice and piano.
- Viola, Mélodie, also called Un soupir.
- "When last we met thy face was fair", text by G. Macfarren, voice and piano.
