= Waverley Park =

Australian rules football oval in Mulgrave, Victoria

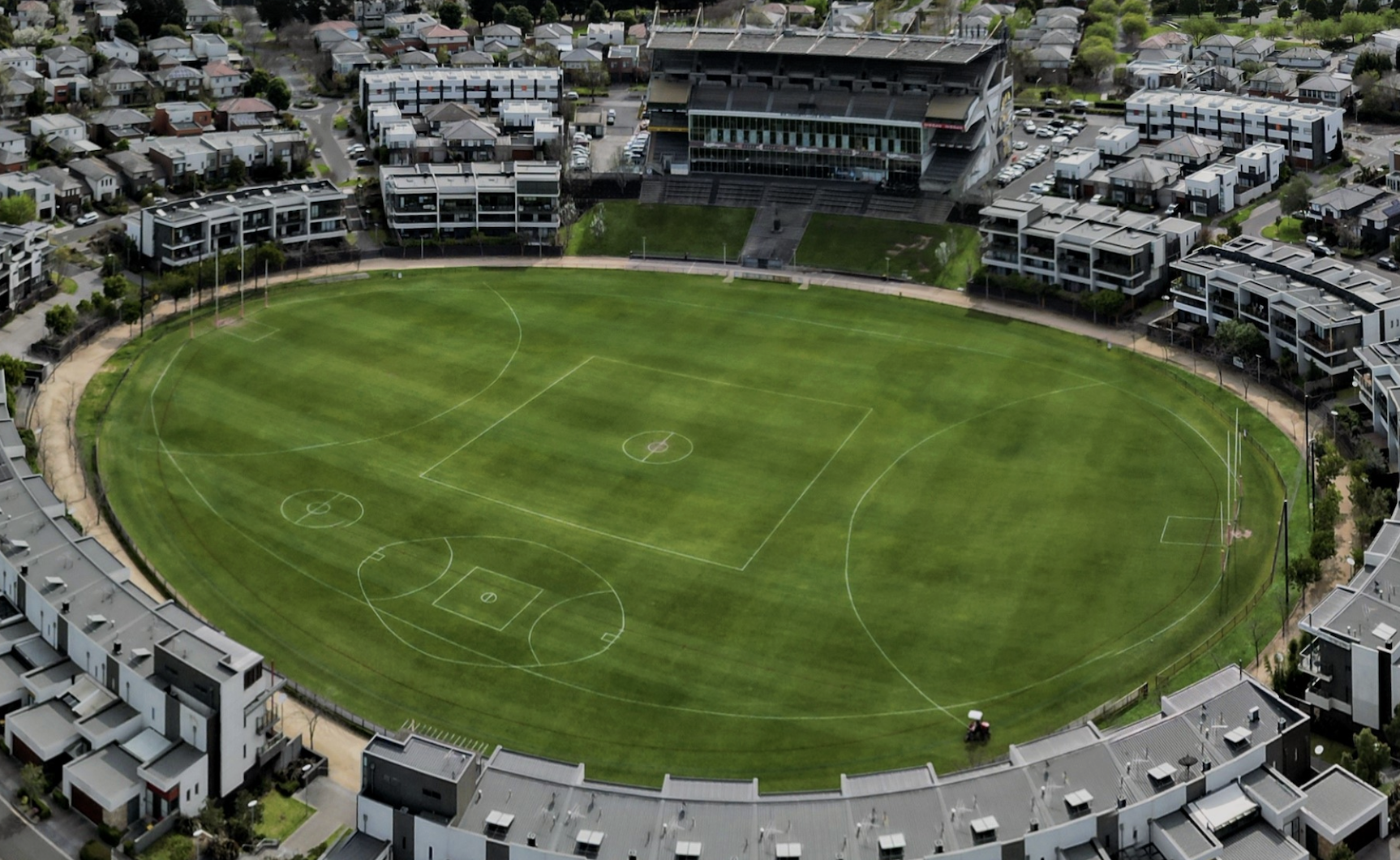
- Waverley Park in September 2023
- Interactive map of Waverley Park
- Former names: VFL Park (1970–1989); AFL Park (1990–1999); Ricoh Centre (2011–2021); Bunjil Bagora (2021–2025)
- Address: 2A Stadium Circuit, Mulgrave, Melbourne, Victoria, Australia
- Coordinates: 37°55′32″S 145°11′19″E
- Owner: Mirvac (since 2001); Australian Football League
- Operator: City of Monash (since 2022)
- Capacity: 2,000 (formerly 72,000)
- Record attendance: 92,935 (Hawthorn vs Collingwood, 6 June 1981)

Construction
- Groundbreaking: 5 January 1966; 60 years ago
- Opened: 18 April 1970; 56 years ago
- Renovated: August 2000 – early 2006
- Cost: A$3 million (1970)

Tenants
- Hawthorn Football Club (AFL, 1991–1999; Administration & Training, 2006–2025); St Kilda Football Club (AFL, 1992–1999); Richmond Football Club (AFL, AFLW 2026–present; Training only); Waverley Reds (ABL, 1989–1994)

Victorian Heritage Register
- Official name: Waverley Park
- Type: Registered place
- Designated: 7 September 2000
- Reference no.: H1883
- Heritage overlay no.: HO88
- Category: Public Art; Recreation and Entertainment

Waverley Park (also and originally called VFL Park) is an Australian rules football oval and former large-scale stadium located in the south-east Melbourne suburb of Mulgrave. The first venue to be designed and built specifically for Australian rules football, it served as a neutral stadium for Victorian-based Victorian Football League/Australian Football League (VFL/AFL) clubs upon its opening in 1970. During the 1990s, it became the home ground of both the Hawthorn and St Kilda football clubs.

It ceased to be used for AFL games after the 1999 season following the opening of Docklands Stadium. It was then used as the training and administration base for Hawthorn from 2006 to 2025. The seating capacity is now 2,000, down from a peak of 72,000–90,000. The stadium's playing surface was 200 metres (660 ft) long and 160 metres (520 ft) wide, making it the biggest in the AFL. In 2026, it was reported that the Melbourne Football Club was considering moving its training and administrative department to Waverley Park on an interim basis, before a planned move to a new facility at the Caulfield Racecourse Reserve. The majority of the site was sold to Mirvac in 2001 for residental housing; with some portions retained by the AFL and administered by the local council since 2022.

The main grandstand and oval, the two remaining aspects of the stadium that were not demolished, were listed on the Victorian Heritage Register on 7 September 2000 in recognition of their historical, social and architectural significance.

== History ==
=== Origins ===
Waverley Park (then VFL Park) was first conceived in 1959 when delegates from the twelve VFL clubs asked the league to find land that was suitable for building a new stadium. In September 1962, the VFL secured a 86-hectare (212-acre) block of grazing and market garden land in Mulgrave. The area was chosen because it was believed that, with the effects of urban sprawl and the proposed building of the South-Eastern (later called Monash) freeway, the area would become the demographic centre of Melbourne. The VFL lobbied the state government to extend the Glen Waverley line to the stadium; however, it never occurred.

The original plans were for a stadium catering for up to 157,000 patrons, which would have made it one of the biggest in the world. To accommodate the large number of patrons, the members' stand was to be extended around the whole ground. However, in 1982–1983, when the extensions were due to commence, the Government of Victoria, led by premier John Cain, who was a member of the Melbourne Cricket Club (MCG), refused to approve the plans for the upgrade because it would have threatened the MCG's right to host the VFL Grand Final. The league-owned VFL Park was built with the intent of replacing the MCG as the permanent home of the grand final, but the Victorian government, with interests in the MCG, refused to allow its capacity upgrade. No further development occurred, and the ground capacity was set at just over 100,000 patrons, later reduced to 72,000.

In 1965, construction started. However, roads were not upgraded, and a rail line never built, which led to persistent transportation problems, inspiring a 1986 song called "Stuck in Waverley Car Park" by Greg Champion.

Its location made it easier for Gippsland-based football patrons to attend VFL games, given the shorter travelling distance. In contrast, it drew criticism for its reliance on car transport to get spectators to the venue.

=== Construction ===
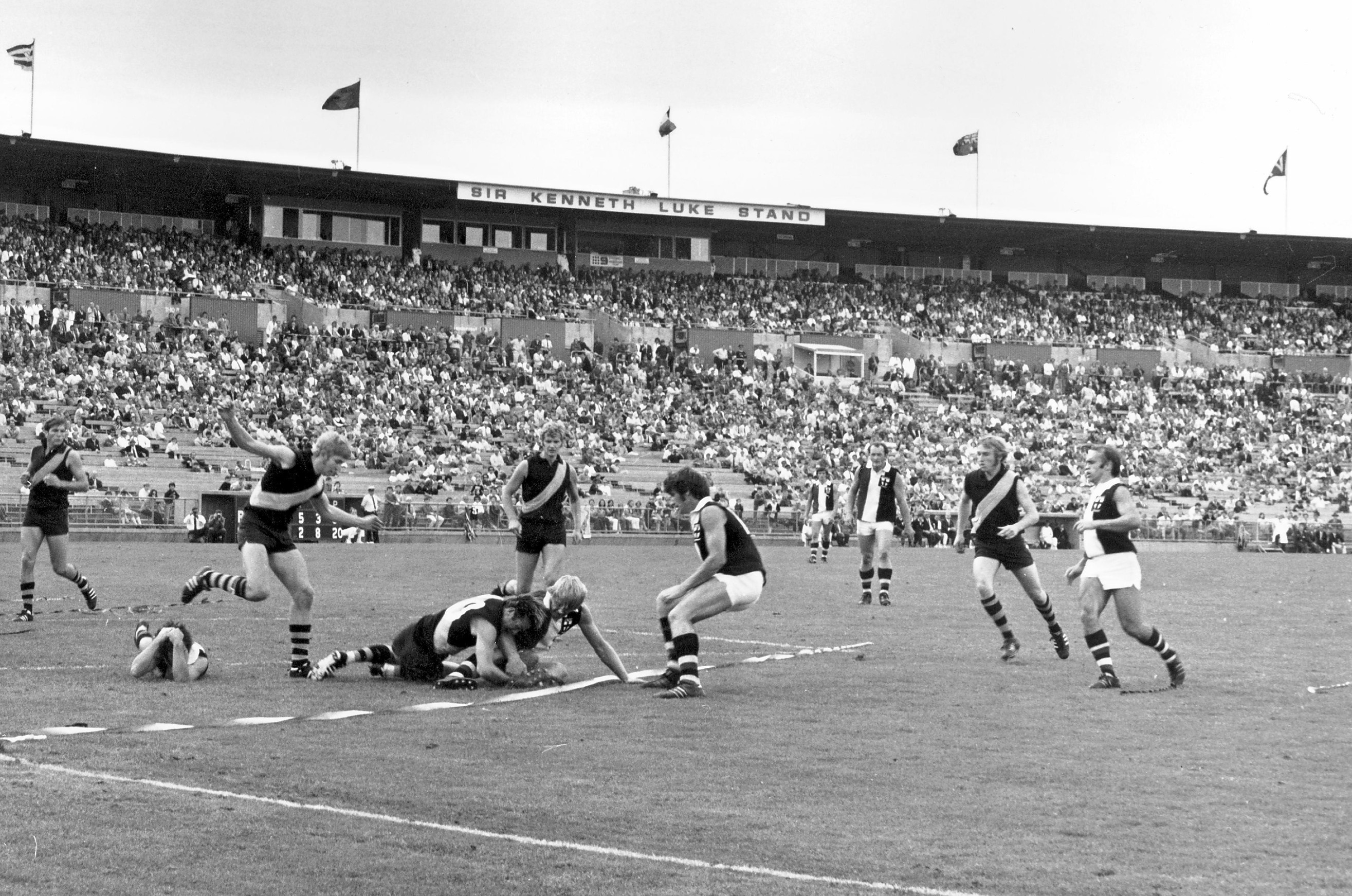
Richmond and St Kilda playing at Waverley Park during the 1970s

Under the direction of architect Reginald E. Padey of Meldrum and Partners, work started at the site on 5 January 1966 when the VFL President Sir Kenneth Luke turned the first sod. Construction of the stadium involved the excavation of 289,002 cubic metres (378,000 cu yd) of topsoil, and the surface of the oval was lowered to a depth of 8 metres (27 feet) from the surrounding area. The spoil was used to form the banks for some sections of the stadium. The foundations of the K.G. Luke stand were laid in 1969 and more than 19 kilometres (12 mi) of concrete terracing was laid around the ground.

On 18 April 1970, in round 3 of the 1970 season, the first official match at the ground was held between Fitzroy and Geelong in the VFL reserves competition, which was followed by the senior match between the same clubs in front of a crowd of 27,557. Footage of the opening bounce from the reserves match was published online for the first time in 2026. At this point, the stadium was far from completed, with only the first level of the K. G. Luke Stand finished. The rest of the stadium was constructed to ground level only.

The Public Reserve Stands encircling the rest of the stadium were finished in 1974, at a cost of $4.5 million, and the car park was extended to fit a total of 25,000 cars. Lighting was added in May 1977, at a cost of $1.2 million, in time for the first of the televised 1977 night series matches. In 1982, a monochrome video matrix scoreboard (known as the "VFL Park Superboard") was installed, for the first time in VFL history, displaying instant replay highlights. In 1984, the arena was re-turfed and the drainage system upgraded. Two years later, a mosaic mural, commemorating many great names of VFL football, was installed on the grandstand façade above the members' entrance. During the 1988 season, automatic turnstiles were introduced at the members' entrance.

=== Closure ===
Waverley Park in the 1990s

In 1988, concrete cancer was discovered in the Southern Stand at the MCG. This provided the impetus to replace the fifty-year-old stand with a state-of-the-art facility that was completed in 1992 at a cost of $150 million, subsequently named the Great Southern Stand. The new stand was jointly funded by the AFL, allowing the AFL the opportunity to negotiate a better commercial arrangement with the Melbourne Cricket Club. This reduced the AFL's incentive to drive finals and blockbuster games to Waverley Park. The old practice of scheduling 'match of the round' at the ground ended quickly, and by 1993 it was used as a home ground by Hawthorn and St Kilda.

In 1999, the AFL announced that it would not schedule any further matches at Waverley Park. Instead, it would aim to sell the ground and its surrounding land, hoping to raise from $30 to $80 million to go towards the construction of a new stadium under construction at Docklands at the western end of the Melbourne central business district. Later, the AFL would also argue that a portion of the income from the sale of Waverley would provide further finance for the development of Australian rules football as a national code in Australia. The last official AFL game was played in 1999 between Hawthorn and Sydney in front of a sell-out crowd of 72,130.

After the AFL's decision to close the venue, the ground's fundamental flaws were highlighted. Despite an excellent playing surface and its own water storage, focus shifted to its unfavourable position, and its antiquated corporate and spectator facilities available, such as the originally high-tech but now ageing video screen. Although Waverley Park was only 20 minutes from the Melbourne CBD by car and was serviced by the Monash Freeway, it was only easily accessible by car, as successive governments had failed to provide adequate public transport to the venue. The stadium's car park was large enough to service its crowds, but the access roads were incapable of dispersing them, and long delays for driving spectators were common. Spectators felt distanced from the game in the huge arena, and seating was only partly undercover giving it the unflattering nickname "Arctic Park" which was due to its location on an exposed site, with the prevailing south-westerly winds bringing rain to Melbourne's eastern suburbs directly from Port Phillip Bay.

In 2000, AFL pre-season cup matches and practice matches were played at the venue, with the last AFL-connected Australian rules football match being a practice match on 26 February 2000, when St Kilda defeated Richmond 95 to 36. Victorian Football League games also took place there, including finals and the grand final. The Eastern Football League (EFL) also played its Division 1 and Division 2 grand finals at the venue at the conclusion of the 2000 season, including the Division 1 grand final on 26 August 2000, which was to be the final night game at the venue.

The 2000 VFL Grand Final was the last game of football involving senior teams played at the venue when Sandringham 15.18 (108) defeated North Ballarat 11.11 (77) in front of a sparse crowd of 8,652 people.

Afterwards, Waverley Park was not maintained, and vandals eventually broke into the site and damaged the facilities. The playing surface, once one of the best in Australia, was reduced to a field of weeds. In mid-2002, Victorian MP Mary Delahunty called on the AFL to mow the dilapidated stadium, as it remained under their control until the plans for the site by housing developer were approved. In December 2001, the ground and surrounds were sold by the AFL to Mirvac for a reported $110 million; once the plans were approved, the ground was demolished starting on 11 December 2002.

=== Current status ===
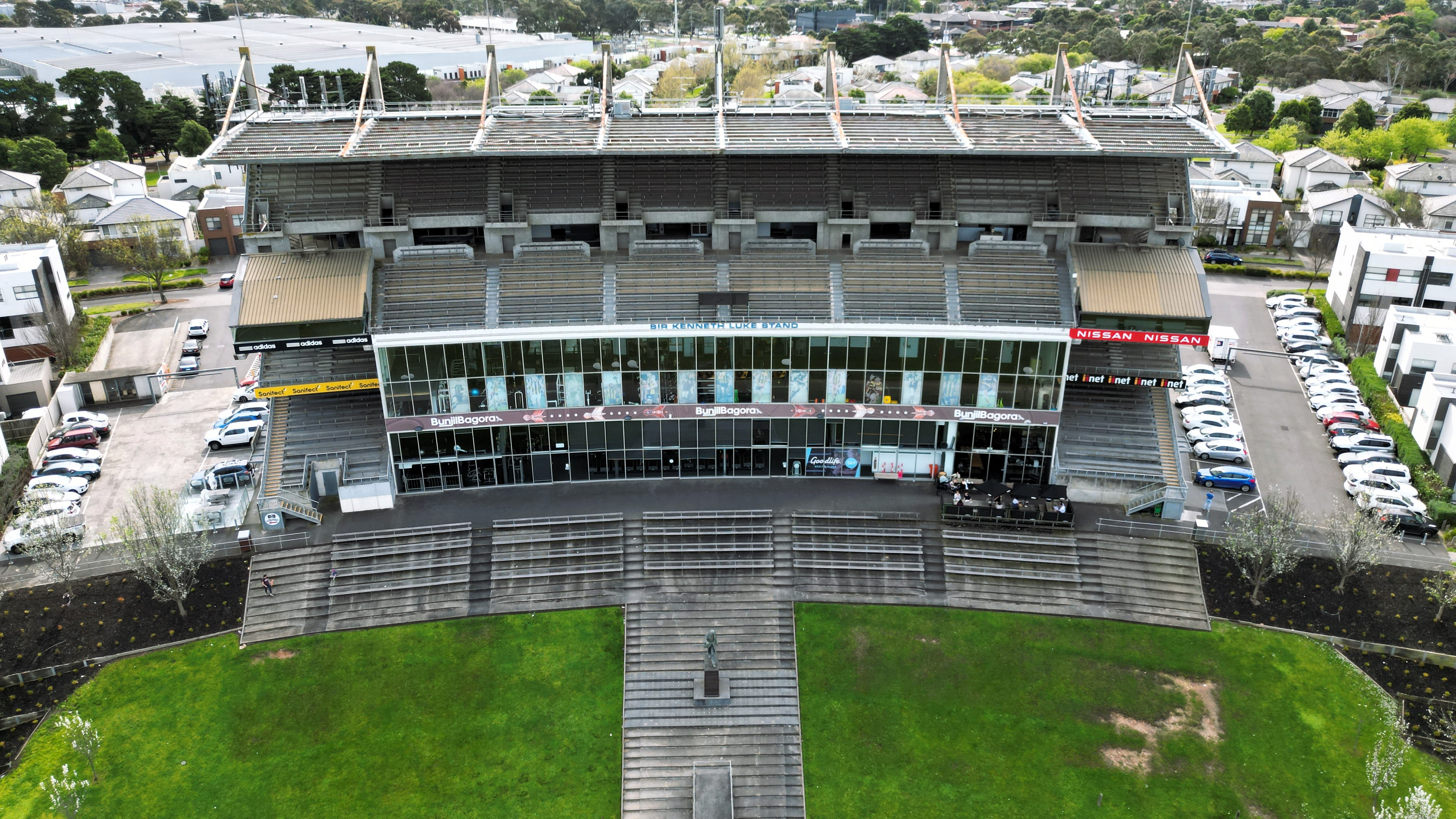
The Sir Kenneth Luke Stand in September 2023

Following its cessation as a venue for AFL football, the stadium fell into a state of disrepair, and anticipating complete demolition, the City of Greater Dandenong, on behalf of football patrons in southeast Victoria, moved quickly to nominate the whole of the facility and its grounds for listing on the Victorian Heritage Register. The basis for the nomination was that the stadium was the first major stadium purpose-built for Australian rules football, that its construction and ownership by the VFL provided the basis on which the league built its power base and eventual evolution to become the AFL, that it hosted the 1991 AFL Grand Final, that night-time cricket games were first held at the ground, and that the members' (or K.G. Luke) stand featured a mural of football legends by Harold Freedman. Granted statutory heritage listing in September 2000, the executive director of the Victorian Heritage Council stated that its listing was a seminal case for an understanding of the cultural heritage significance of 20th-century places.

Following its statutory listing as a heritage site, since December 2002, portions of the stadium were demolished except for the members' stand and the members' stand mural. The surrounding car park was replaced by suburban housing, including 1,400 new dwellings for 3,500 people. In homage to the original place and its purpose, the street layout mirrors the original car park and street names honour Waverley's patron Sir Kenneth Luke, architect Reginald Padey and other associations with football and cricket. The members' stand is visible from the nearby Monash Freeway; however, due to new noise walls installed on the freeway alignment, the stand's visibility from the freeway was significantly reduced.

The oval and the eight bays of the Sir Kenneth Luke Stand were retained and, together with the remaining section of the members' stand, they were redeveloped into a new training and administrative facility for the Hawthorn Football Club— a similar arrangement to what Adelaide Football Club have with Football Park in Adelaide. The Hawthorn Football Club moved its administrative and training facilities from Glenferrie Oval to a redeveloped Waverley Park in early 2006 in preparation for the 2006 season. The facility incorporated an MCG-dimension oval, the size of the playing arena having been reduced from its original size, and it includes a 25-metre (82 ft) heated indoor swimming pool, four refrigerated ice tanks, a gymnasium with a 60-metre (197 ft) running track and a warm-up area with projection and screen facilities to simulate match-day conditions.

The grandstand has seating for approximately 2,000 patrons, with the seating in the top level of the grandstand retained.

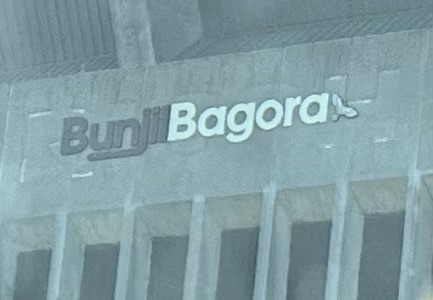
The logo of Bunjil Bagora (top) and the logo covering the former Ricoh Centre logo outside of the Sir Kenneth Luke Stand (bottom)

On 14 December 2011, Waverley Park was renamed to the Ricoh Centre under naming rights. In November 2021, Hawthorn renamed its training and administrative facility Bunjil Bagora, a term originating from the Woiwurrung–Taungurung language.

Waverley Park remained in use for occasional Victorian Amateur Football Association (VAFA) matches. A Thirds match between AJAX and Beaumaris was played at the ground on 14 April 2024.

In 2018, the Hawthorn Football Club announced plans to build a new training and administration facility named the Kennedy Community Centre in Dingley to replace Waverley Park.

In early 2025, Waverley Park was officially listed for sale, with the Waverley Park Elite Training and Administration Complex, along with the adjoining Goodlife Health Club Gym, valued at c.$20 million. In June 2025, the AFL announced it had purchased Waverley Park from the Hawthorn Football Club for an undisclosed sum. Hawthorn commenced moving from Waverley Park to the Kennedy Community Centre in October 2025, with Hawthorn's AFLW team holding their final training session at the venue on 21 October 2025.

In 2026, Richmond moved their training base to Waverley on a temporary basis while Punt Road Oval is closed for renovations.

== Notable events ==
- The first-ever final played at the ground was also the first-ever elimination final played in VFL/AFL history, played between St Kilda and Essendon in 1972, with St Kilda prevailing 18.16 (124) to 10.11 (71) in front of a crowd of 52,499.
- During the 1973 season, 42,610 attended the first interstate match at the ground (between Victoria and Western Australia) and a record 60,072 attended the second semi-final between Carlton and Collingwood, with Carlton prevailing 15.17 (107) to 12.15 (87).
- Essendon and Carlton contested a once-off match on Anzac Day in 1975 (which Essendon won) in front of a crowd of 77,770.
- The record attendance was 92,935 for Collingwood versus Hawthorn in 1981, with Hawthorn prevailing 18.19 (127) to 12.9 (81).
- In 1977, Fitzroy played North Melbourne in the first night match at the stadium in the Amco-Herald Cup. The game started 55 minutes late after the State Electricity Commission's supply to the $1 million lighting system failed just ten minutes before the game was due to begin. A fuse was thought to have blown in the feeder pole to the ground. All power to the ground was turned off for 18 minutes while it was repaired.
- In 1977, VFL Park played host to the first 'Supertest' of Kerry Packer's World Series Cricket, played between the World Series Cricket Australia XI and the World Series Cricket West Indies XI. It was also host to the first-ever day-night cricket game.
- In 1978, Fitzroy defeated North Melbourne to win the Night series premiership in front of a crowd of 26,420.
- In round 17, 1979, Fitzroy defeated Melbourne by a V/AFL record 190 points, during which they recorded what was then the highest score in the league's history, scoring 36.22 (238).
- On 15 November 1980, the band Kiss played for a crowd of over 40,000 on their first tour of Australia.
- In 1987, Fitzroy played North Melbourne in the first night match at the stadium for premiership points in the major competition. A total of 183,383 people watched the three finals games at VFL Park and the preliminary final attendance of 71,298 was the largest since 1984. The game was between Melbourne and Hawthorn, and Hawthorn won from a goal kicked after the siren, by Gary Buckenara after a 15-metre penalty was awarded against Jim Stynes.
- In 1989, VFL Park hosted the first ever Sunday VFL match played for premiership points.
- The ground hosted its first and only AFL Grand Final in 1991, which was contested by Hawthorn and the West Coast Eagles because the Melbourne Cricket Ground at the time was undergoing construction of the Great Southern Stand. In front of a crowd of 75,230, Hawthorn defeated West Coast by 53 points in the seniors grand final. The same day saw history in the making with Brisbane defeating Melbourne by 34 points in the reserves grand final, and with North Melbourne defeating Collingwood by 38 points in the very last under-19s grand final.
- In 1996, an unexpected pitch invasion occurred when the lights went out at the stadium in a night game between Essendon and St Kilda during the third quarter due to a car hitting a transmission tower nearby. After declaring the match finished for the evening, the AFL commission held an emergency meeting to decide what should happen, as there was no provision in the official rules for an event like this. They decided to continue the match three days later. Essendon kept their winning position comfortably, starting with a 20-point lead and winning with a 22-point margin. Controversially, the Bombers made five changes to their line-up between the two parts of the match. Prior to the match, St Kilda coach Stan Alves complained about the situation and stated that his team is "not going to go kamikaze" and risk an injury when they did not have much chance of winning. The AFL subsequently decided on a set of rules to be applied for incidents of this kind: if a game is not started, the league in control of the match shall determine the result. Games that start but are interrupted prior to half-time are deemed to be drawn if the game can not recommence within 30 minutes, while, if the game is interrupted after half-time, the scores at the time are deemed to be final.
- Sunday 7 September 1997 saw Waverley Park host its last-ever AFL finals match, which saw St Kilda defeat Brisbane Lions in front of a crowd of 50,035.

== Football records ==
In its history, 732 AFL/VFL matches were played at Waverley Park, 70 of which were finals and one a grand final.

- Highest score: Fitzroy: 36.22 (238) v Melbourne: 6.12 (48) in round 17, 1979
- Largest crowd: 92,935, Queen's Birthday (6 June) 1981, Hawthorn v Collingwood
- Most goals scored in one game: Jason Dunstall, 17 goals, Round 7, 1992, Hawthorn v Richmond

== Special events ==
Waverley Park hosted many special events other than Australian rules football. These included:

- Rock concerts: Rod Stewart (1979), Kiss (1980), David Bowie (1983), U2 (1998) and Simon & Garfunkel (1983). A 6 December 1993 concert for Michael Jackson's Dangerous World Tour was cancelled after the tour was cut short.
- Cricket: World Series Cricket games between 1977 and 1979.
- International rules football: Matches between Australia and Ireland.
- Baseball: Home of the Waverley Reds from 1989 until 1994.

== See also ==
- List of sports venues in Melbourne
