= Nalaka, Florida =

Former settlement in Florida, US

- Country: United States
- State: Florida
- County: Highlands County, Florida

Nalaka, sometimes written Nalaca, was a Highlands County, Florida settlement that sprang up as a turpentine industry town in the early 20th century, founded around 1918 and ceasing to exist by 1929.

Nalaka was one of the settlements set up along the Kissimmee River Railway connecting logging and timber industry towns to a branch line of the Seaboard Air Line Railroad system. By the 1920s, the town was controlled by Consolidated Naval Stores (now part of the Consolidated Tomoka Land Company); the only store in the town was the company's commissary. The population of the town was approximately 250 at its peak, large enough to secure it an official US Postal Service office.

In 1929, the town was disassembled by Consolidated Naval Stores and relocated near Lake Placid, Florida. This was typical for turpentine operations once the trees needed for raw materials were used up.

Archaeologists have found remnants of the clay cups used to catch the turpentine tapped from the area's trees near the site of the former town.
