= List of VFL/AFL and AFL Women's players from the Australian Capital Territory =

This is a list of players from the Australian Capital Territory to have played in the Australian Football League (AFL) and the AFL Women's (AFLW), the two pre-eminent competitions of Australian rules football.

== List of players ==
=== Men's ===
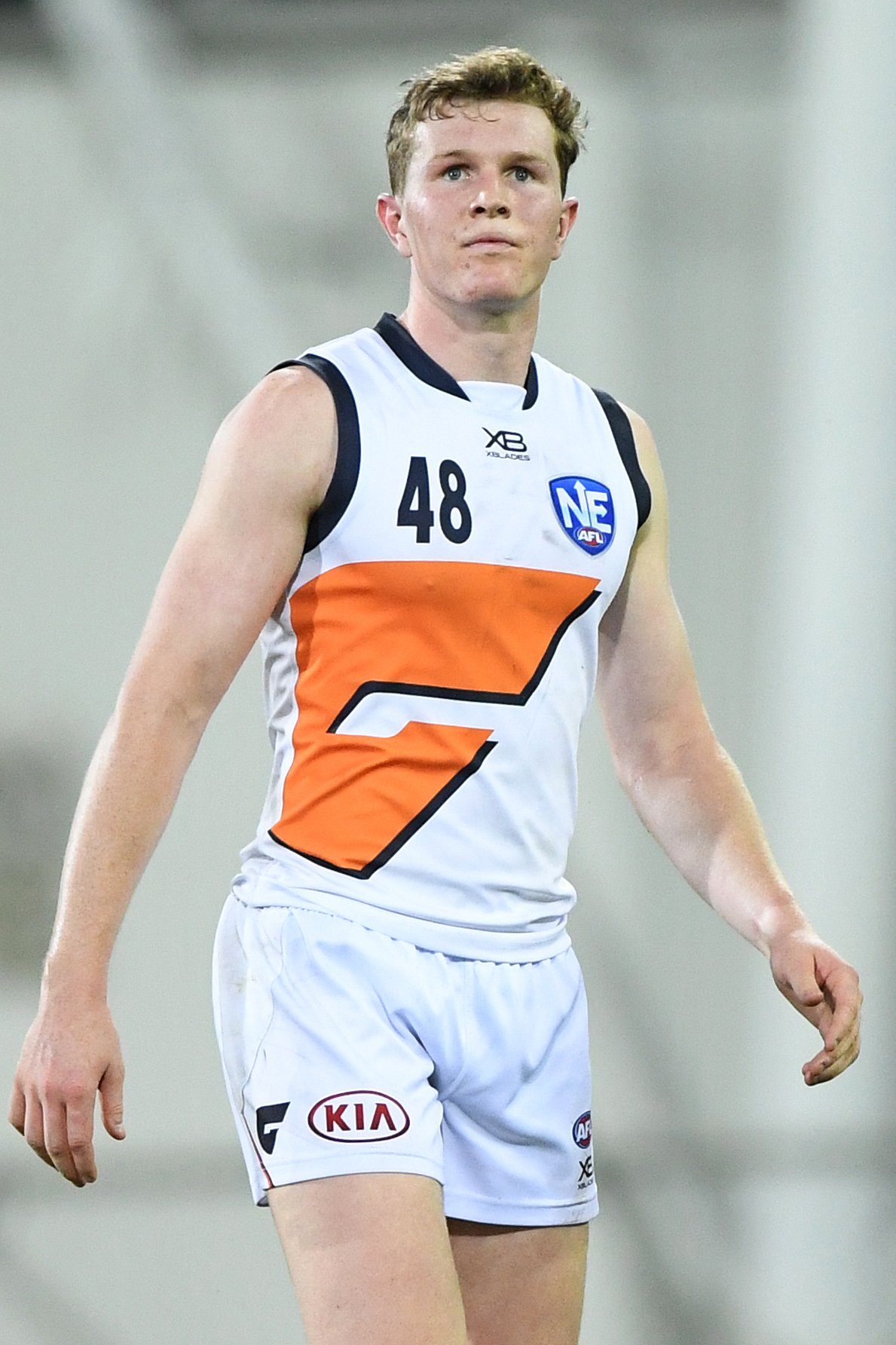
Tom Green with GWS in 2019

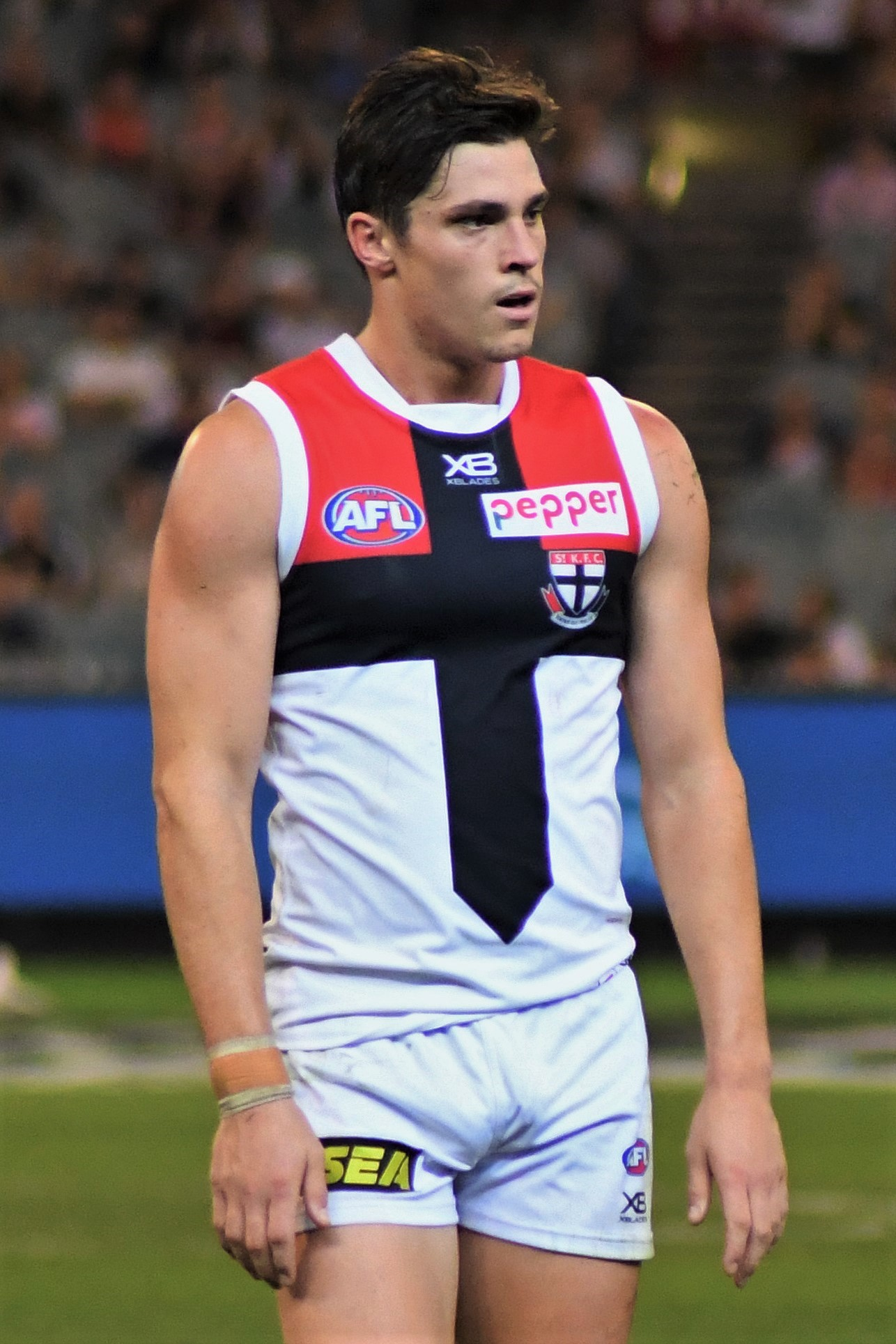
Jack Steele, All-Australian playing for St Kilda in 2019

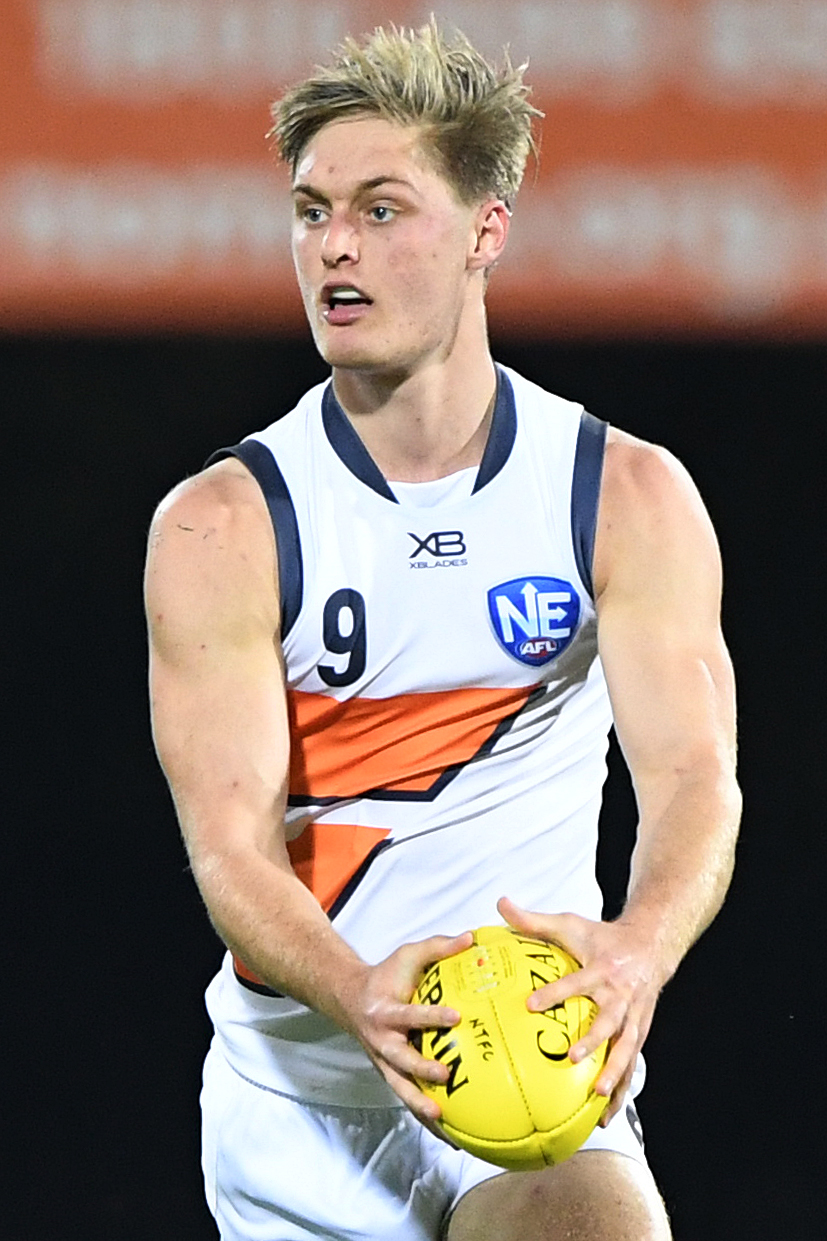
Jackson Hately playing for GWS Giants in 2019

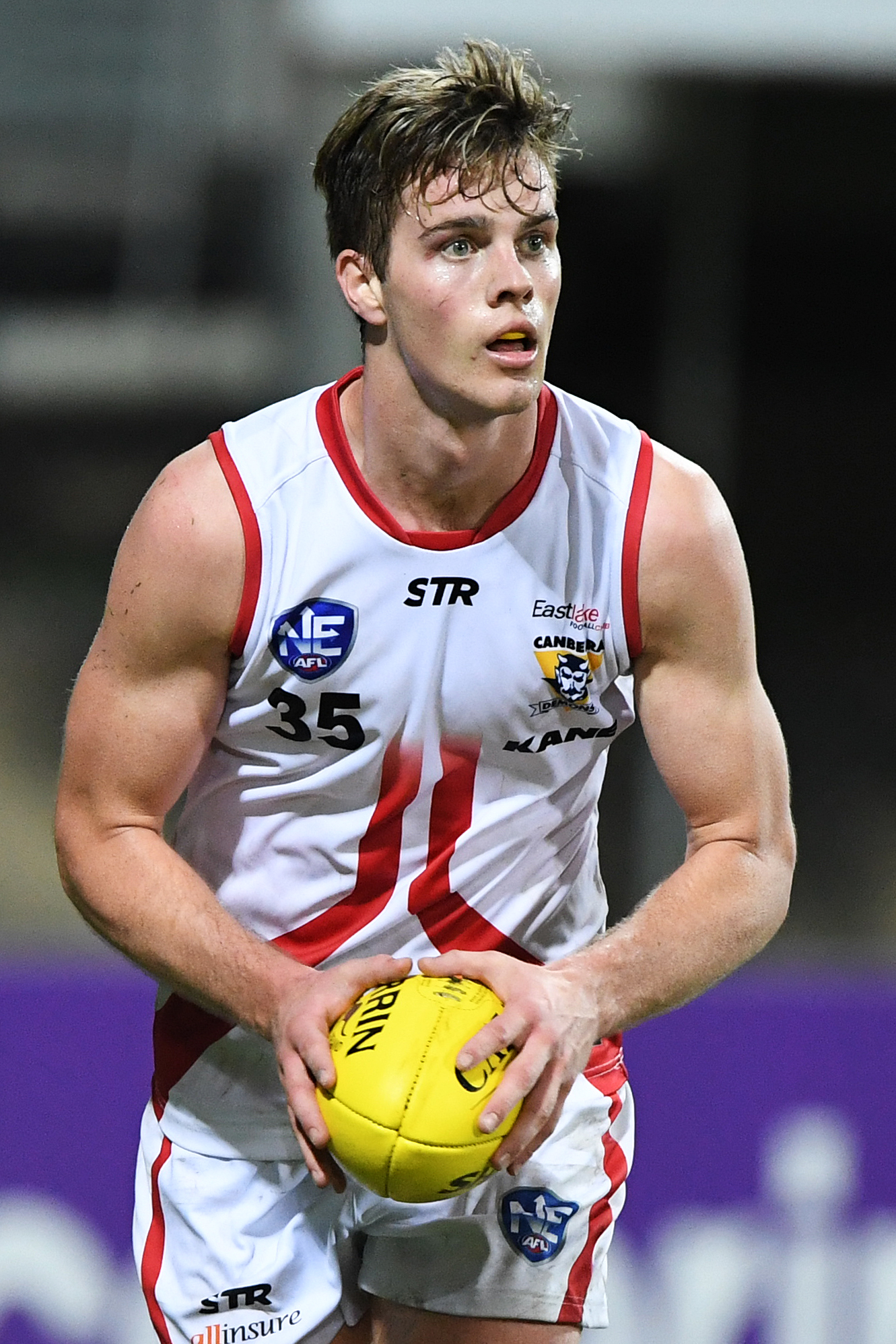
Tom Highmore playing for St Kilda in 2019

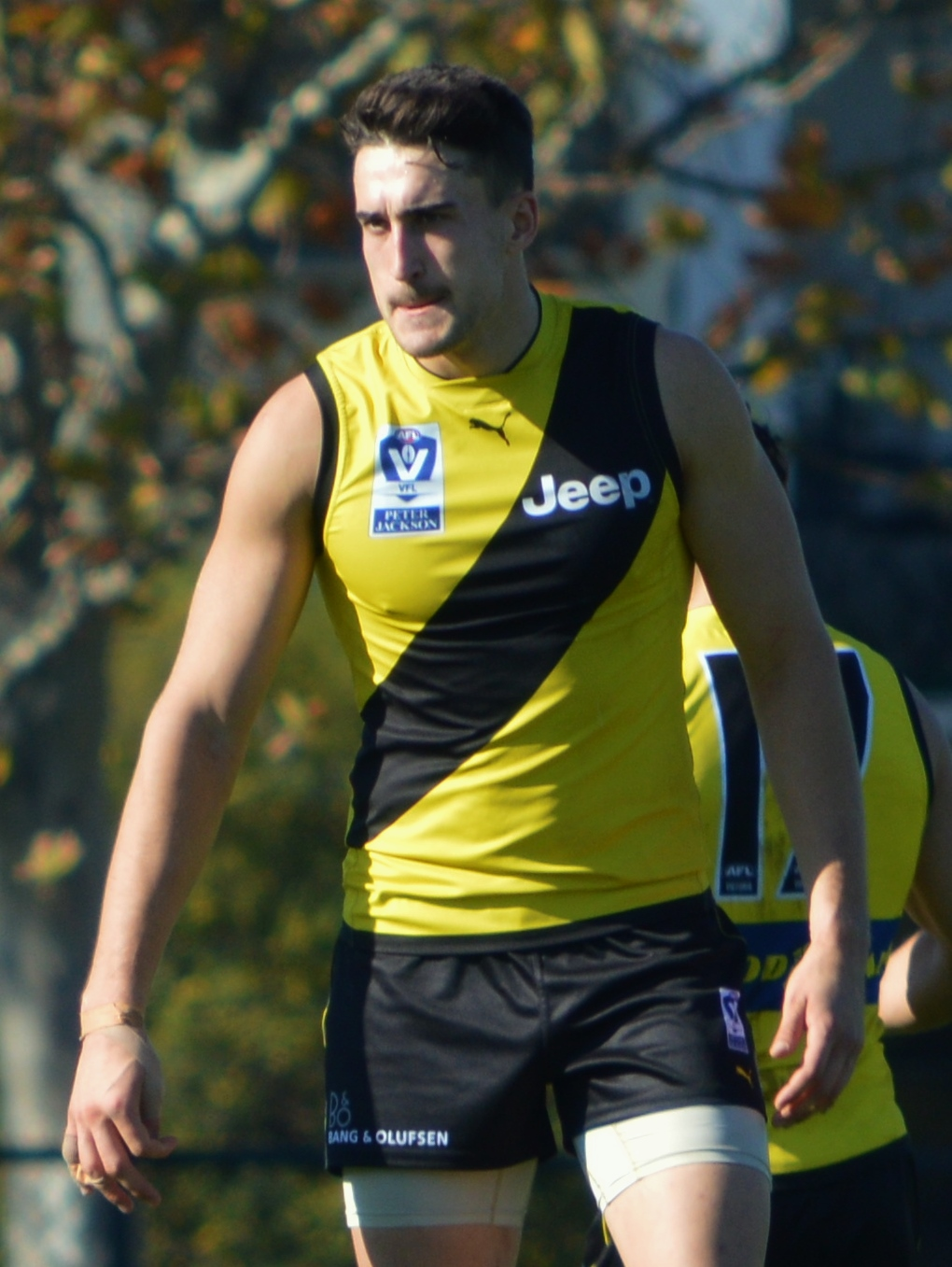
Ivan Soldo playing for Richmond (VFL) in 2018

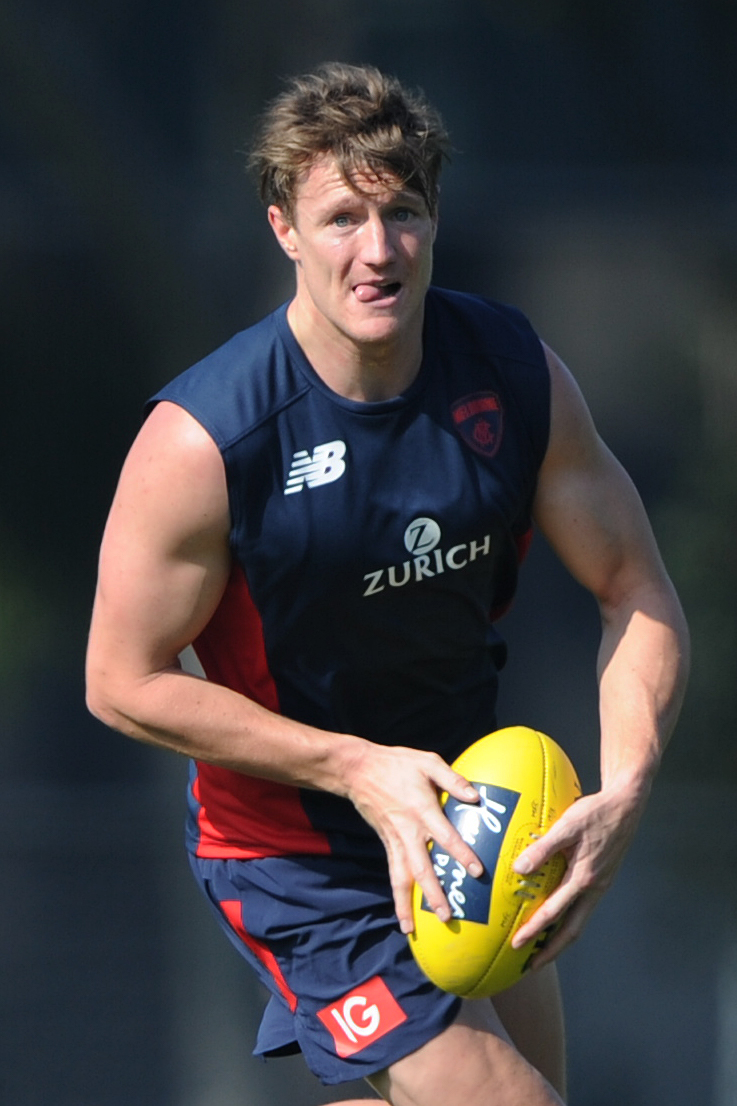
Aaron vandenBerg training with Melbourne in 2018

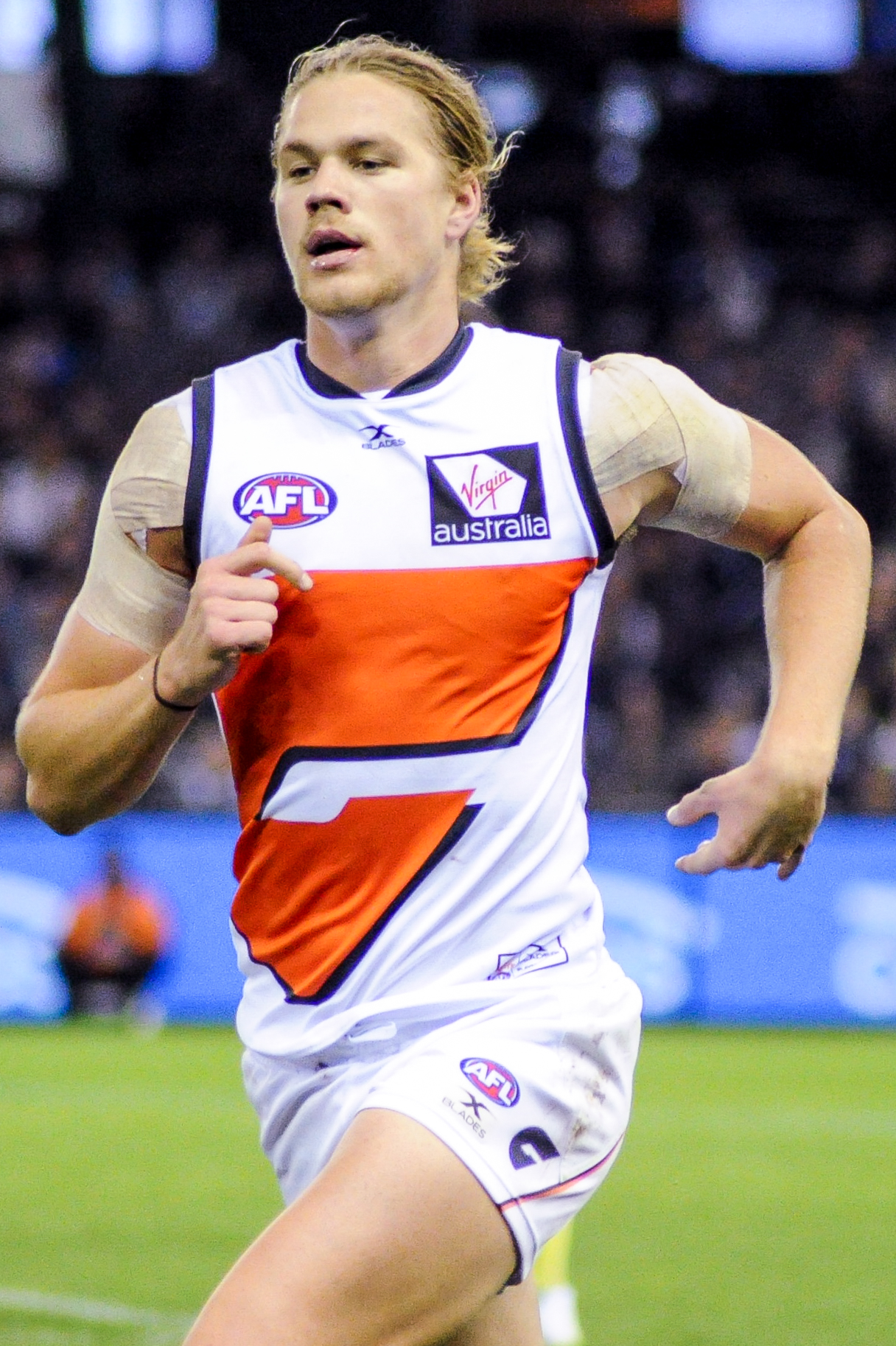
Harrison Himmelberg with GWS Giants in 2017

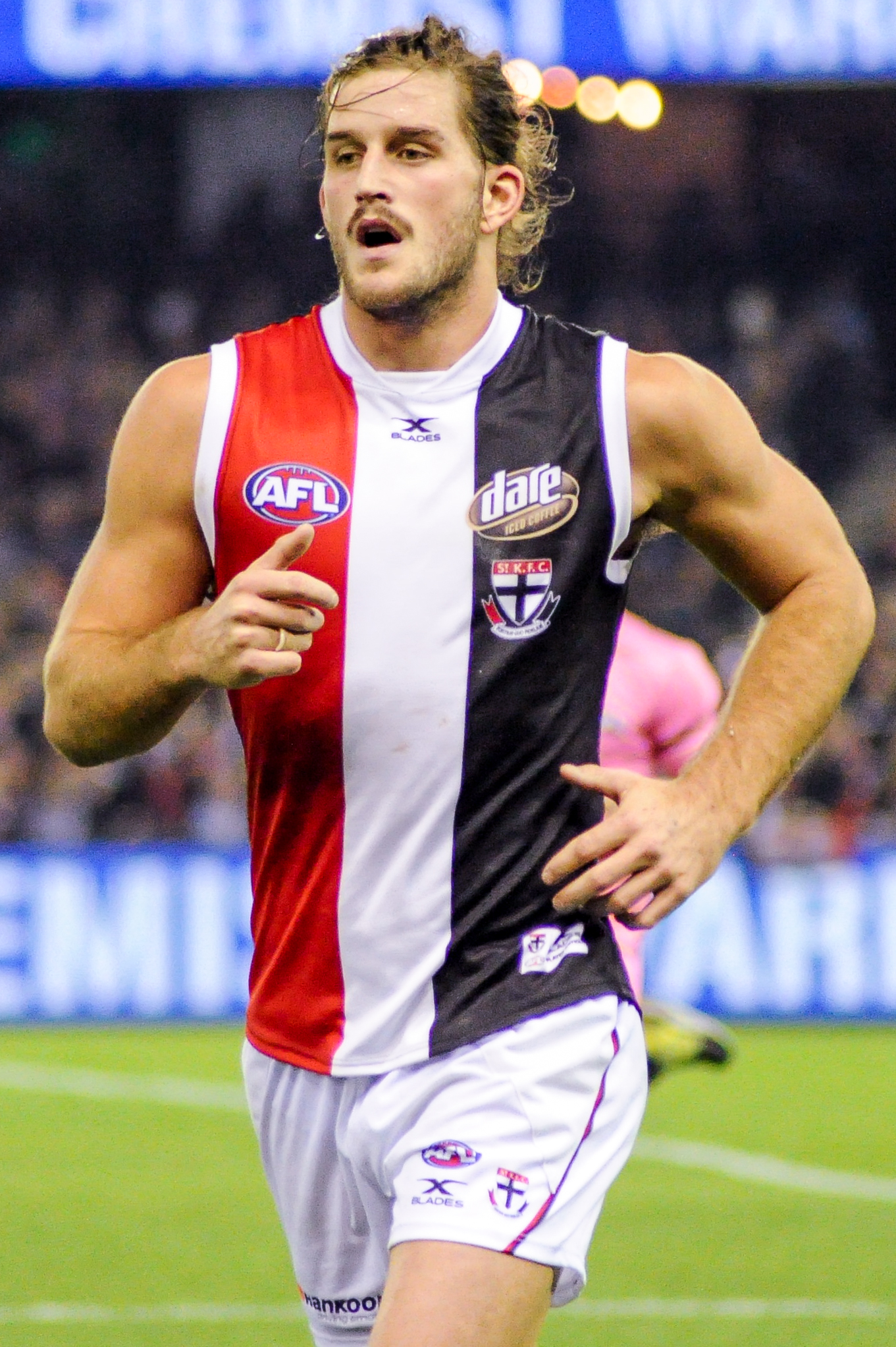
Josh Bruce playing for St Kilda in 2017

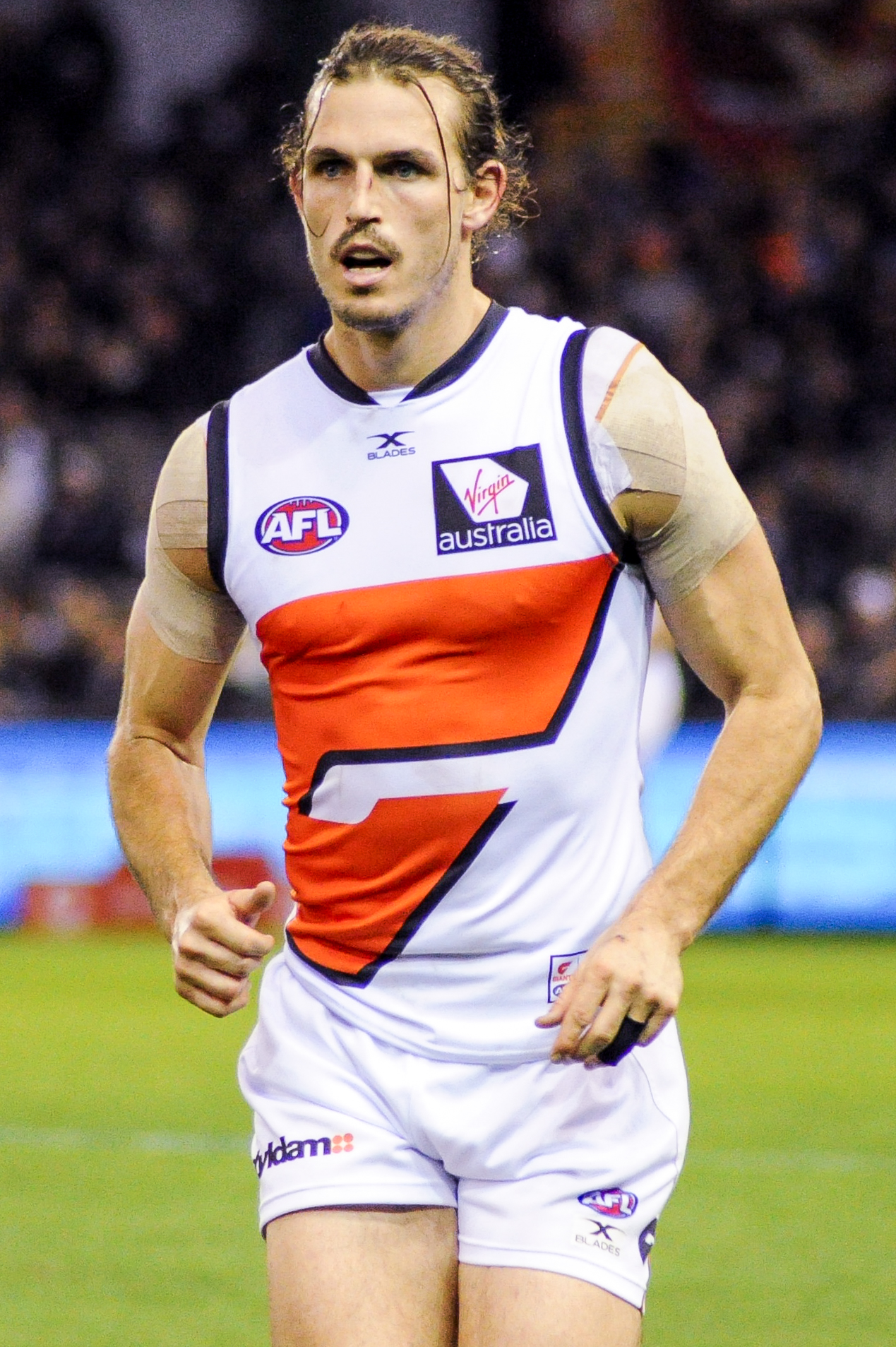
Phil Davis playing for GWS Giants in 2017

Currently on an AFL senior list

Player	ACT junior/senior club/s	Representative honours	AFL Draft	Selection	AFL Years	AFL Games	AFL (Goals)	Connections to ACT, Notes & References
Cooper Bell	Belconnen Magpies		2024	49	2025-	0	0	Born and raised in Canberra
Logan Smith	Queanbeyan Tigers		2024	71	2025-	0	0	Born and raised in Canberra
Josh Fahey	Queanbeyan		2021	42	2023-	7	4	Born and raised in Canberra
Tom Highmore	Tuggeranong Lions/Tuggeranong Hawks/Canberra		2020	45	2021-2023	13	0	Born, raised, recruited
Tom Green	Marist College Canberra		2019	10	2020-	111	47	Raised in Canberra
Jackson Hately	-		2018	14	2019-2023	28	4	Born
Harry Himmelberg	Canberra		2015	16	2016-	197	163	Recruited
Jack Steele	Belconnen	U18 (NSW/ACT Rams) (2013)	2014	24	2015-	199	70	Born, raised, recruited
Aaron vandenBerg	Ainslie		2015 (rookie)	Rookie (#2)	2015-2021	47	23	Recruited
Ivan Soldo	-		2015 (rookie)	Rookie (#68)	2015-	66	28	Born, raised, recruited
Logan Austin	Belconnen		2014	69	2015–2020	20	0	Born and raised in Canberra
Adam Oxley	-		2013 (rookie)	Rookie (#35)	2013–2018	34	10	Born
Josh Bruce	Eastlake		2011	Zone	2012–2023	150	233	Born, raised and recruited
Jason Tutt	Ainslie		2009	31	2010–2016	40	27	Born and raised in Canberra
Phil Davis	Marist College Canberra		2008	10	2009-2023	187	7	Born and raised in Canberra till age 14
James Meiklejohn	Tuggeranong	U18 (NSW/ACT Rams 2003)	2003 (rookie)	Rookie (#71)	2003–2004	6	0	Raised and recruited
Craig Bolton	Eastlake	U18 (NSW/ACT Rams)	1998	33	2000–2010	199	25	Raised and recruited
Brad Fuller	Tuggeranong / Marist College Canberra / Eastlake	U18 (NSW/ACT Rams)	1996	87	1997–1998	16	5	Raised in Canberra
Jacob Anstey	Tuggeranong		1995	63	1997–1998	16	5	Raised in Canberra
Justin Blumfield	Tuggeranong		1995	62	1996–2004	148	91	Recruited
Aaron Hamill	Tuggeranong		1994	79	1995–2007	190	239	Raised in Canberra
Troy Gray	St Edmunds College				1992–1997	60	26	Raised in Canberra
Robert Neill	-		1990	Zone	1992–1997	44	16	Raised in Canberra
James Hird	Ainslie	NSW/ACT (1993)	1990	79	1991–2007	253	343	Born and raised in Canberra
Wayne Weidemann	Eastlake	1990			1991–1996	68	26	Played there prior to AFL career
Don Pyke	Belconnen	NSW/ACT (1993)	1988	2 (pre-draft)	1989–1996	132	70	Raised in Canberra
Michael Werner	Queanbeyan	1988, NSW/ACT (1993)	1988	9	1989–1994	60	80	Raised in Canberra
Matthew Mahoney	Eastlake		1988	69	1989–1992	6	0	Raised in Canberra
Michael Kennedy	Manuka-Weston / Eastlake	1988	1987	41	1988–1990	23	3	Raised in Canberra
Brett Allison	Belconnen	1988			1987–2000	228	285	Raised in Canberra
Shaun Smith	Ainslie	1988			1987–1998	109	134	Raised in Canberra
Adrian Barich	Marist College Canberra / Manuka	1988			1987–1992	47	27	Born and raised in Canberra
Adam Garton	West Canberra				1987–1988	3	1	Raised in Canberra
Peter Kenny	Manuka	1979			1986	11	20	Raised in Canberra
Geoff Hocking	Belconnen	1988			1981	6	0	Played there
Robert Anderson	Queanbeyan	1979			1980-1984	16	6	Born and raised in Canberra
Neil Bristow	Ainslie	1979			1979	10	4	Raised in Canberra
Michael Conlan	Manuka	1979			1977-1989	210	395	Raised in Canberra
Richard Murrie	-				1975-1983	111	13	Raised in Canberra
Ian Low	Manuka				1975-1980	78	79	Raised in Canberra, recruited
Keith Miller	Eastlake	1979			1974	2	0	Played there
Geoff Craighead	Australian National University FC				1973	7	0	Raised
Robert Whatman	Manuka				1973	34	17	Raised
Geoff Harrold	Ainslie / West Canberra / Queanbeyan	1973, 1979			1972	2	0	Raised
Rob Smith	Ainslie	1979			1971–77	48	48	Raised
Laurie Moloney	Belconnen	1979			1971–76	80	8	Played there
Alan Bloomfield	Ainslie				1970–1971	13	7	Recruited
Paul Feltham	Eastlake				1970–1978	135	86	Lived there, Recruited
Alex Jesaulenko	Eastlake				1967-1981	279	444	Raised in Canberra
Kevin Neale	Ainslie	1979c			1965-1977	256	301	Played there
Jack Douglas	Eastlake				1952-1953	14	0	Recruited
John McGreevy	Duntroon Military College				1952	3	0	Recruited
Alan Stevens	Ainslie / Eastlake / Manuka				1948-1950	22	1	Raised

=== Women's ===
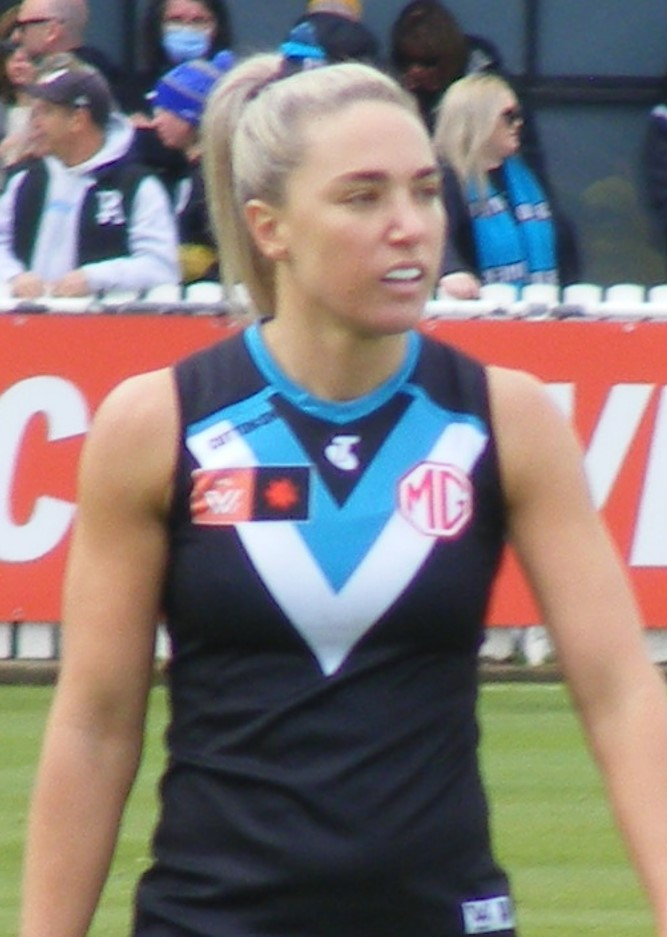
Hannah Dunn playing for Port Adelaide in 2022

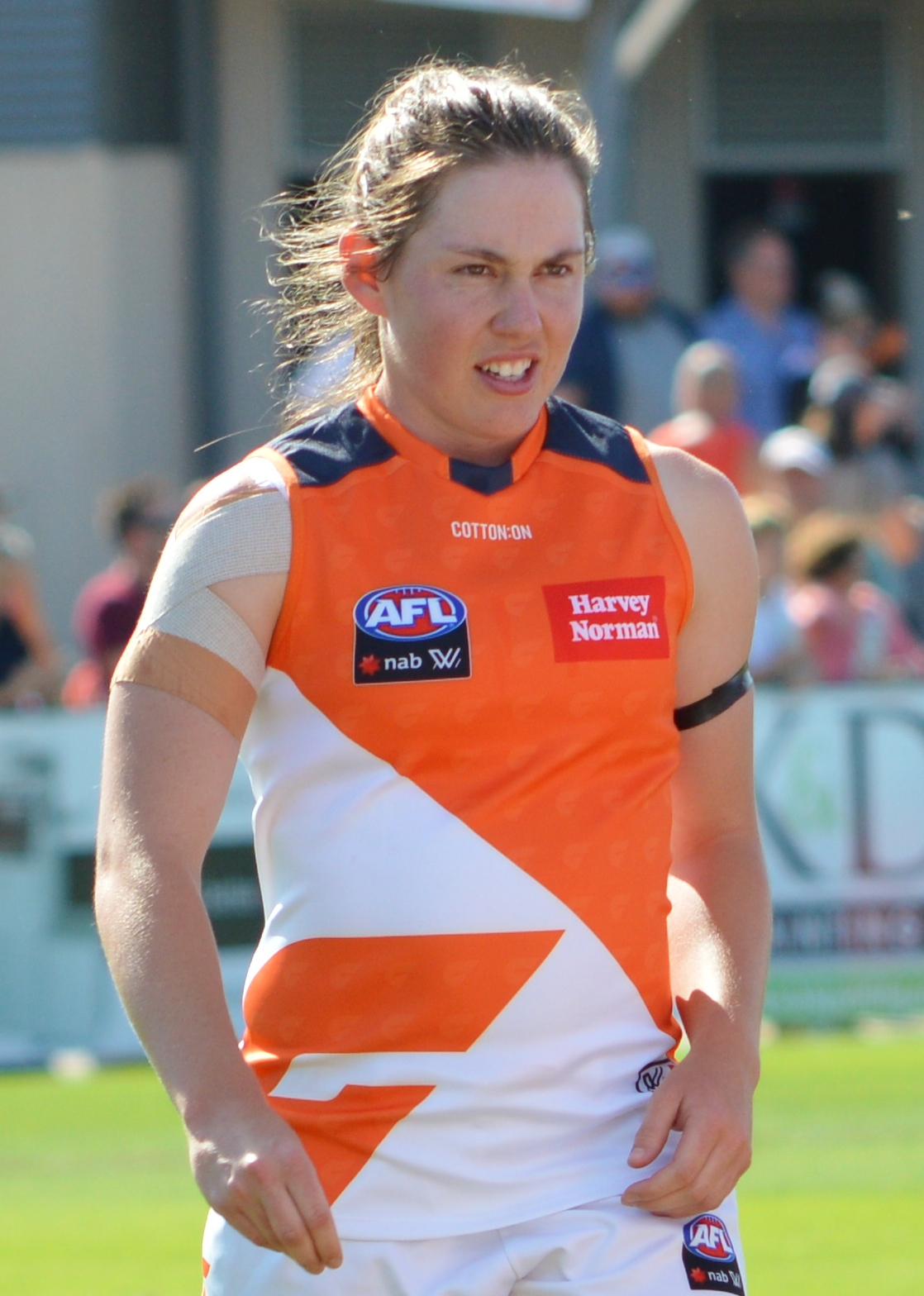
Jodie Hicks playing for GWS Giants in 2018

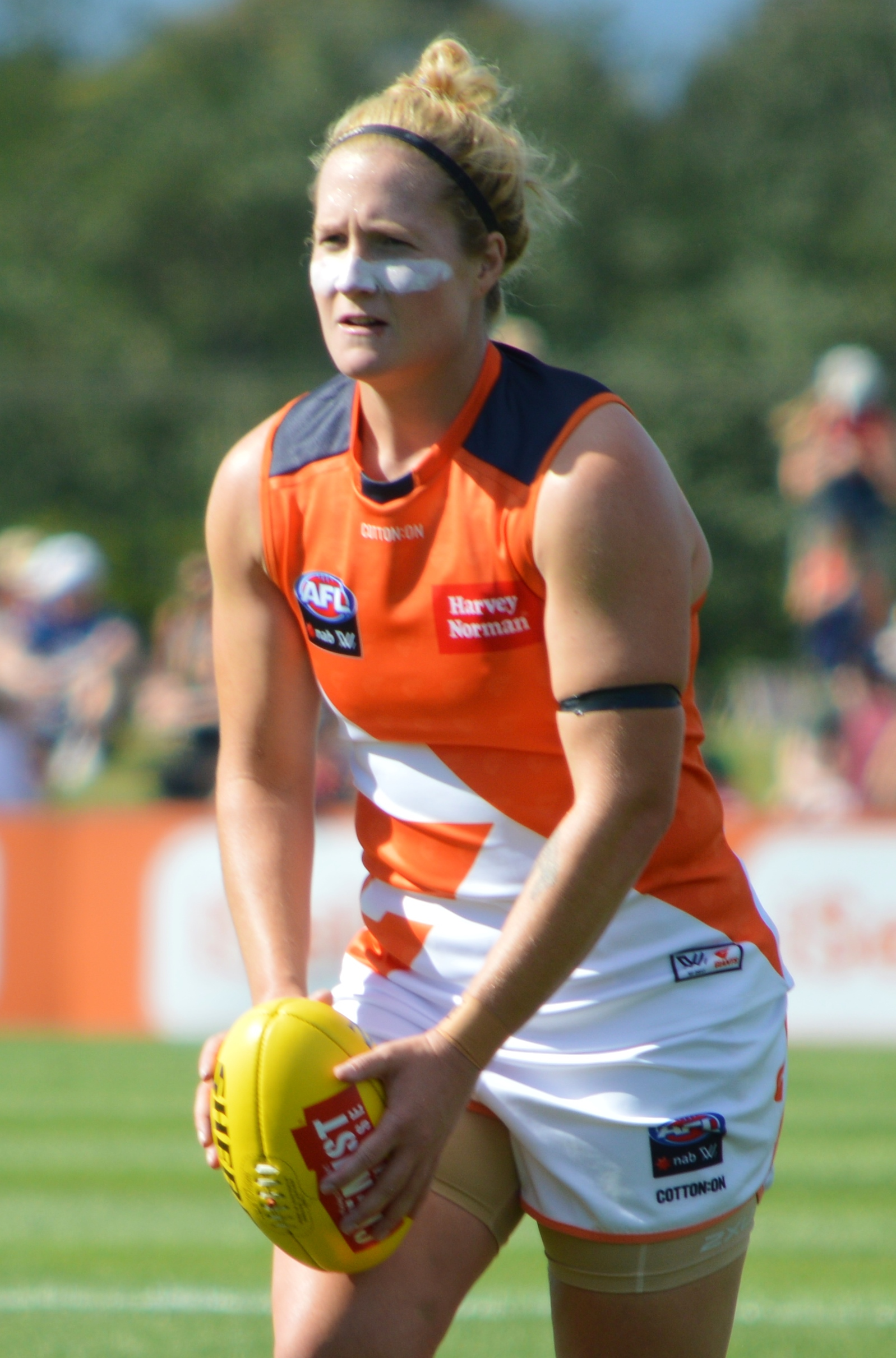
Britt Tully playing for GWS Giants in 2018

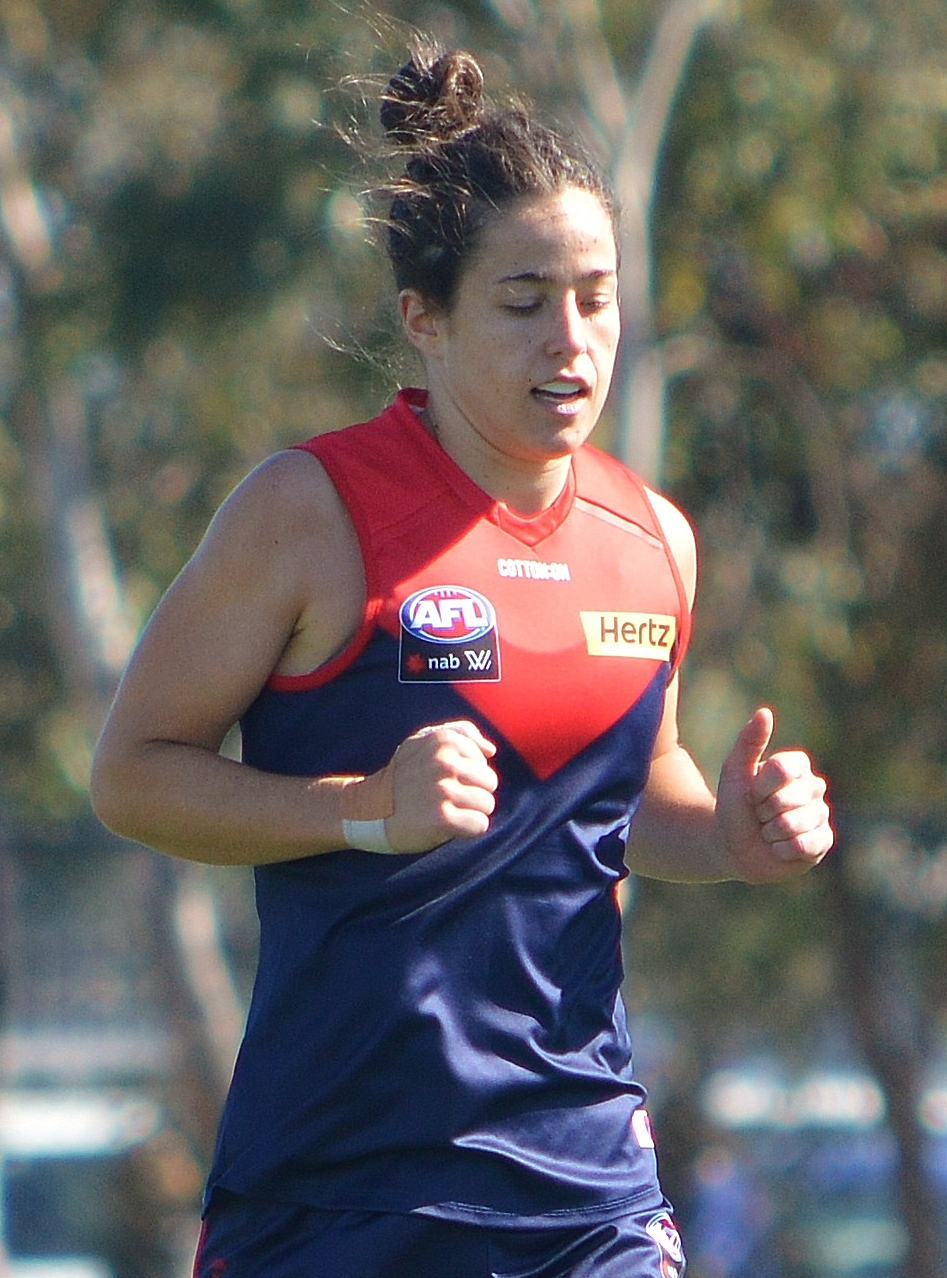
Jacqueline Parry playing for Melbourne in 2021

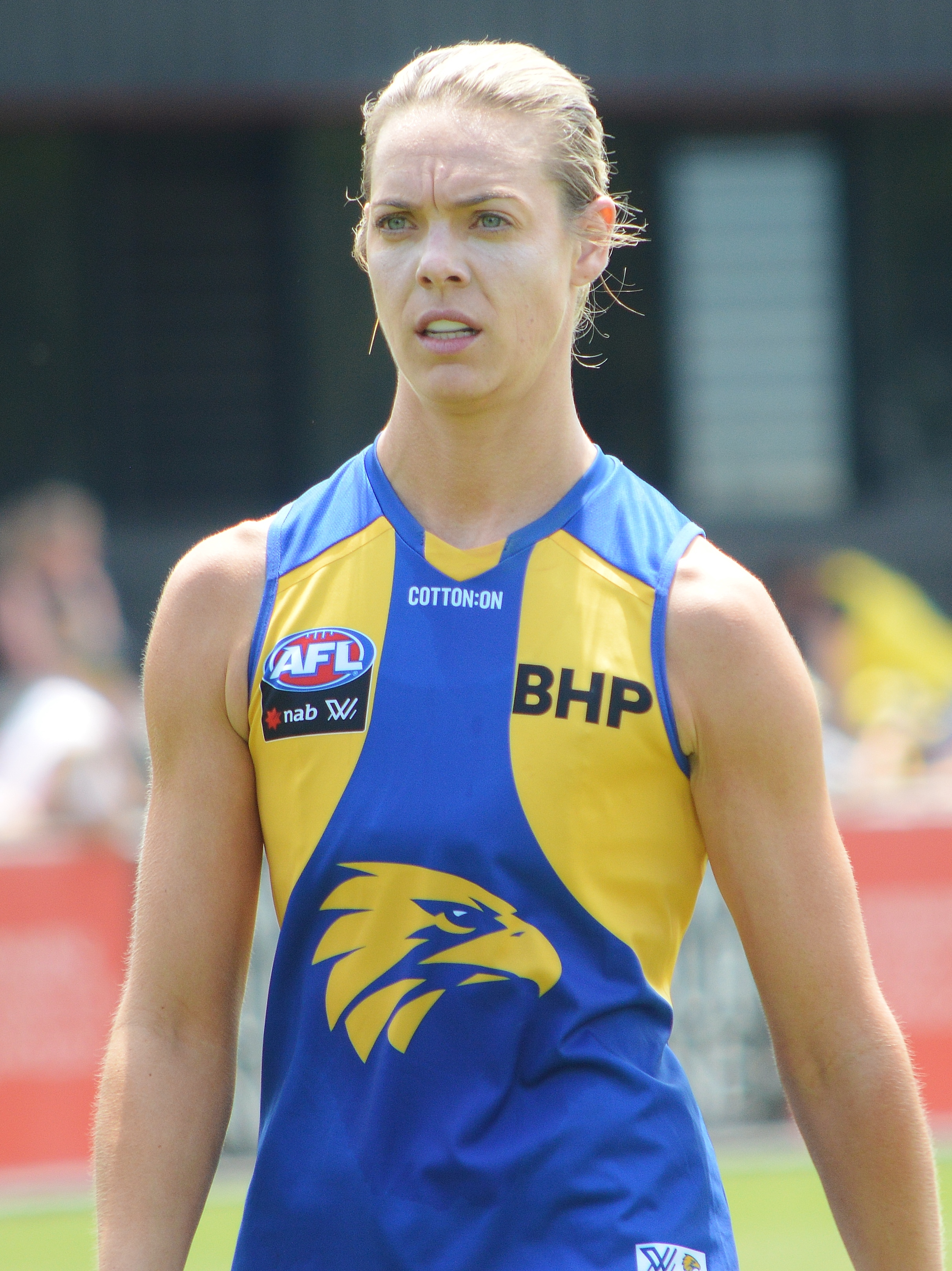
Talia Radan playing for West Coast in 2020

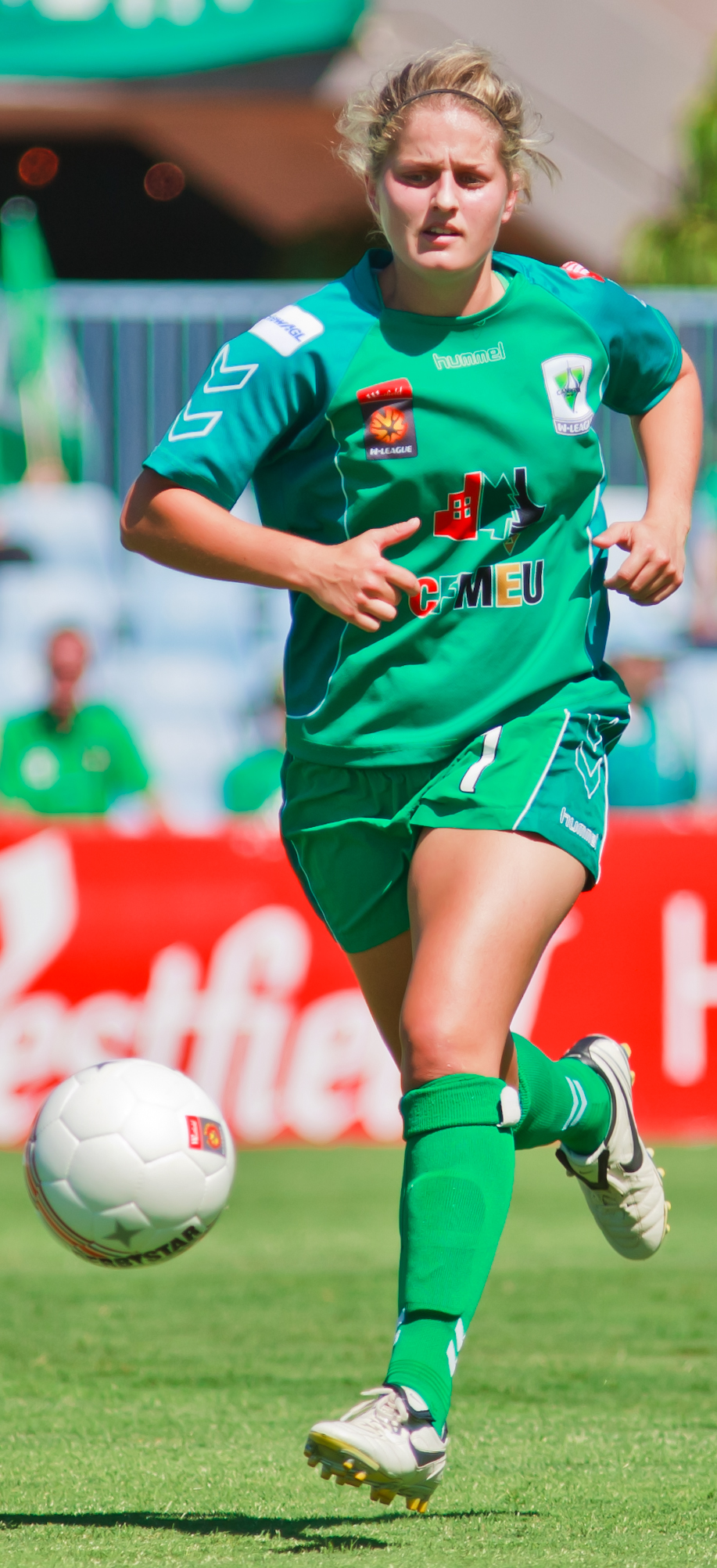
Ellie Brush playing soccer for Canberra United in 2019 also plays AFLW with Greater Western Sydney

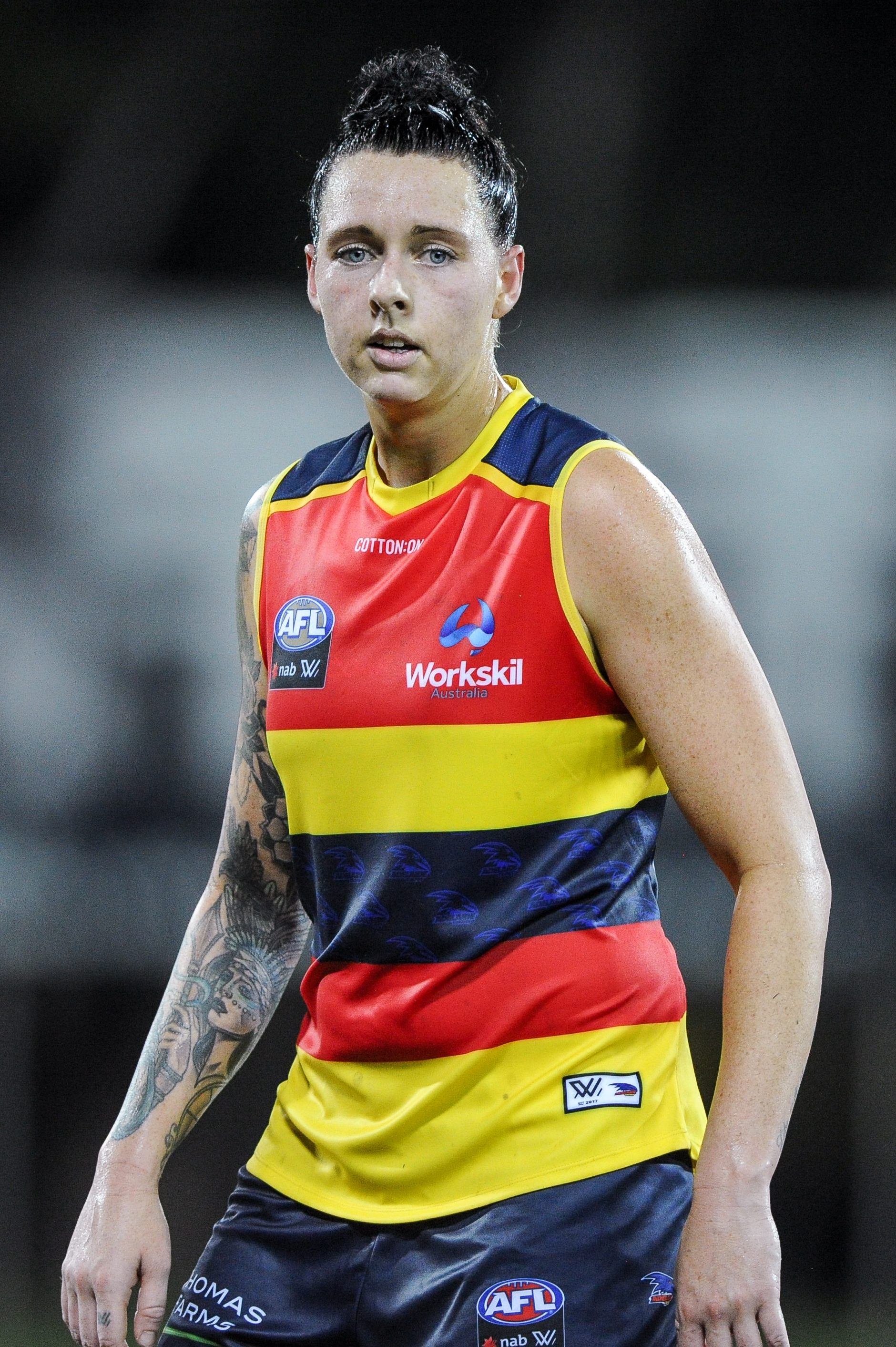
Rhiannon Metcalfe playing for Adelaide in 2018

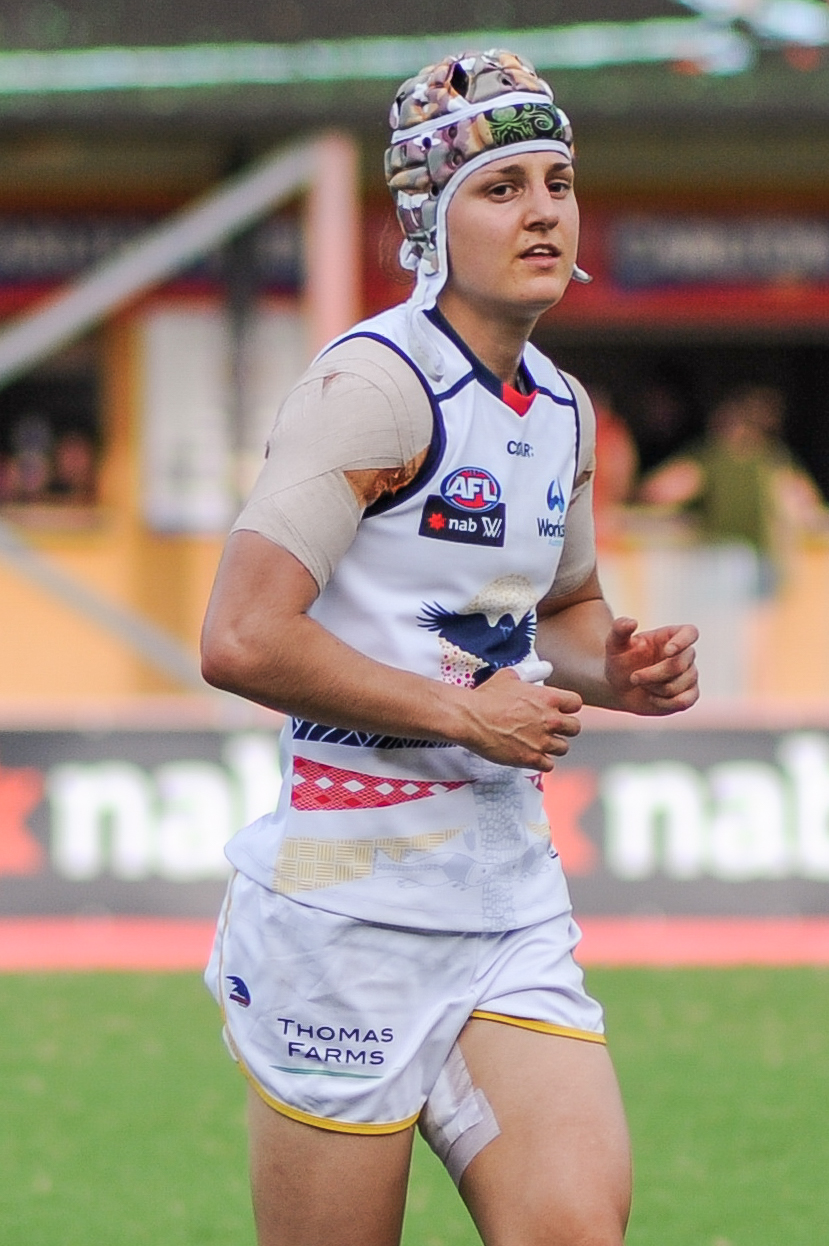
Heather Anderson playing for Adelaide in 2017

Currently on an AFLW senior list

Player	ACT junior/senior club/s	Representative honours	AFLW Draft	Selection	AFLW Years	AFLW Games	AFLW (Goals)	Connections to ACT, Notes & References
Zara Hamilton	Belconnen				-	-	-	Recruited from Canberra
Maggie Gorham	Belconnen, Ainslie				2023-	1	-	Raised in Canberra
Cynthia Hamilton	Belconnen, Queanbeyan		2022	11	2022-	21	10	Raised in Canberra
Cambridge McCormick	Eastlake				2022-	18	-	Recruited from Canberra
Emily Pease	Belconnen				2022-	16	4	Raised in Canberra
Catherine Brown	-		2022	pre-list	2022-	-	-	Born, raised in and recruited from Canberra
Ally Morphett	Belconnen		2021	37	2022-	12	0	Recruited from Canberra
Najwa Allen	Eastlake		2019	37	2022-	16	0	Recruited from ACT
Tess Cattle	Ainslie				2022-	1	-	Recruited from ACT
Tarni Evans	Queanbeyan, Tathra Sea Eagles		2020	9	2021-	9	0	Raised in Canberra, Recruited from ACT
Jacqueline Parry	Queanbeyan, ANU Griffins		2019	54	2020-	15	6	Recruited from ACT
Alexia Hamilton	Queanbeyan, Canberra		2019	38	2020-	3	0	Recruited from ACT
Maddie Shevlin	Gungahlin		2017 (rookie)	Rookie (#13)	2018-	13	1	Recruited from ACT
Jodie Hicks	Belconnen		2017	5	2018-2021	20	3	Recruited from ACT
Britt Tully	Gungahlin		2016	80	2017-	29	4	Recruited from ACT
Rhiannon Metcalfe	Gungahlin		2016	74	2017-	26	1	Born and recruited from ACT
Hannah Dunn	Queanbeyan				2017-	25	0	Raised in Canberra
Talia Radan	Belconnen		2016	58	2017-	16	0	Recruited from ACT
Ellie Brush	-		2016 (rookie)	Rookie	2017-2020	20	1	Born and recruited from ACT
Heather Anderson	Belconnen		2016	10	2017	8	0	Born and raised
Ella Ross	Queanbeyan		2016	112	2017	7	0	Recruited from ACT
Hannah Wallett	Belconnen		2016	Free agent	2017	4	1	Recruited from ACT

== See also ==
- Australian rules football in the Australian Capital Territory
