= Mulrooney Medal =

Best and fairest medal in the Canberra Australian rules football competition

The Mulrooney Medal is an Australian rules football award for the best and fairest player in the AFL Canberra first-grade competition. It has been the premier individual award for Australian rules football in the Australian Capital Territory since 1936. From 2011 to 2013, the medal was awarded to the best and fairest player in the Eastern Conference of the North East Australian Football League.

It was named after football administrator John L. Mulrooney, for his contribution to Australian rules football in Canberra.

== Winners ==
Year	Player		Votes	Ref
2023	Guy Richardson	Ainslie	21	
2023	Thomas Simpson	Belconnen	21	
2022	Luke Wharton	Belconnen	20	
2021	Will Griggs	Queanbeyan	17	
2020	Angus Baker	Eastlake	14	
2019	Beau Walker	Belconnen	15	
2018	Kel Evans	Queanbeyan	15	
2017	Beau Walker	Belconnen	18	
2016	James Bennett	Belconnen	20	
2015	Isaac Taylor	Belconnen	21	
2013	James Bennett	Belconnen	21	
2012	Shane Harris	Belconnen	16	
2011	Daniel Currie	Sydney Swans Reserves	16	
2011	Jarred Moore	Sydney Swans Reserves	16	
2010	Mitch Daniher	Queanbeyan	17	
2009	Mitch Daniher	Queanbeyan	13	
2009	Chad Gibson	Eastlake	13	
2009	Craig Healey	Tuggeranong	13	
2008	Ryan Lewis	Ainslie	19	
2007	Jarred Moore	Sydney Swans Reserves	23	
2006	David Spriggs	Sydney Swans Reserves	23	
2005	Jared Ilett	Belconnen	21	
2004	Nathan McDonald	Wagga Tigers	22	
2003	Steve Hazelman	Belconnen	17	
2003	Luke Jess	Tuggeranong	17	
2002	Daniel Jacques	Wagga Tigers		
2001	Steve Mahar	Belconnen		
2000	Guy Cannon	Eastlake		
1999	Shane Clarke	Belconnen		
1998	Stafford Cooper	Tuggeranong	20	
1997	Steve Vizy	Queanbeyan		
1996	Steve Wilson	Eastlake		
1995	Steve Wilson	Southern District	12	
1994	Michael Kennedy	Queanbeyan	17	
1993	John Garnaut	Southern District	16	
1992	Marcus Sheridan	Weston Creek	15	
1991	Brent Smith	Belconnen	12	
1990	Steve Cornish	Queanbeyan	13	
1990	Glen Dickerson*	Eastlake	13	
1990	Andrew Mills*	Manuka Weston	13	
1990	Michael Swan	Manuka Weston	13	
1990	Tony Wynd	Queanbeyan	13	
1989	Tony Wynd	Queanbeyan	13	
1988	Tony Wynd	Queanbeyan	18	
1987	Shane Fitzsimmons	Manuka Weston	18	
1986	Peter Hamilton	Ainslie	21	
1985	Simon Overland	Eastlake	29	
1984	Geoff Hocking	Belconnen	30	
1983	Tony Wynd	Queanbeyan	27	
1982	Greg Nichols	Ainslie	39	
1981	Keith Miller	Eastlake	39	
1980	John Miller	Ainslie	27	
1979	Keith Miller	Eastlake	42	
1978	Greg Eaves	West Canberra	43	
1977	Edney Blackaby	Manuka	23	
1976	Mike Demaine	West Canberra	17	
1975	Robert White	Belconnen	26	
1974	Peter Phillipou	Eastlake	15	
1973	Ralph Rendell	Ainslie	20	
1972	Rob Wilson	ANU	16	
1972	Paul Macdonald*	Eastlake	16	
1971	Bill Vaughan	Manuka	21	
1970	Bill Whittakers	ANU	17	
1969	Russ de Goldi	Acton	17	
1968	Paul Feltham	Eastlake	17	
1967	Neil Lewthwaite	Acton	17	
1966	Bill Drake	Ainslie	19	
1965	Glen Bow	Manuka		
1964	Keith Mitchell	Turner	27	
1963	Bob Shearer	Eastlake	21	
1962	Michael Codd	Manuka	18	
1961	Col Monger	Acton	16	
1960	Jim Wilson	Acton	17	
1959	Barry Griffiths	Acton	25	
1958	John Moody	Royal Military College	29	
1957	John Moody	Royal Military College	31	
1956	Barry Browning	Ainslie	20	
1955	Barry Browning	Ainslie	15	
1954	Roy Watterston	Queanbeyan/Acton	17	
1953	Roy Watterston	Queanbeyan/Acton	18	
1952	John Gleeson	Turner	17	
1951	Ern Hurtig	Eastlake	13	
1951	Barry McCabe	Ainslie	13	
1950	Brendan Cain	Ainslie	14	
1950	Percy Eagles	Manuka	14	
1950	Keith Schow	Queanbeyan	14	
1949	Jim Brophy	Manuka		
1948	Harold Maddigan	Turner	18	
1947	Mervyn Lee	Acton	25	
1946	Alan Stevens	Ainslie	23	
1945	Fred Green	Navy		
1944	–	-		
1943	–	-		
1942	–	-		
1941	Jack Furniss	Fairbairn		
1940	Robert Bloomfield	Ainslie		
1939	Alan Ware	Manuka		
1938	Jack Dorman*	Manuka	13	
1938	Tom Kelly	Queanbeyan	13	
1938	Merv Strang*	Queanbeyan	13	
1937	Phil Barrett	Manuka		
1936	Dick Roe	Ainslie	16	
1936	Roy Seton	Acton	16	

*Retrospectively awarded
