= Furniss =

Furniss is a surname. Notable people with the surname include:

- Brian Furniss (John Brian Furniss 1934–2013), English cricketer
- Bruce Furniss (born 1957), American swimmer
- Delma Furniss (1934-2022), American politician
- Eddy Furniss (born 1975), American baseball player
- Fred Furniss (1922–2017), English footballer
- Harry Furniss (1854–1925), artist and illustrator
- Henry Sanderson Furniss, 1st Baron Sanderson (1868–1939), English academic, socialist, principal of Ruskin College, Oxford
- Jack Furniss (John Kitchener Furniss, 1914–2003), Australian rules footballer
- John Furniss (disambiguation)

- John Furniss (priest) (1809–1865), English Roman Catholic priest
- John Furniss (costume designer) (born 1935), British costume designer

- Lawrence Furniss (1862–1941), English footballer
- Maureen Furniss (21st century), writer, animation historian, animation theorist, critic, and professor
- Stephen Furniss (1875–1952), Canadian politician and farmer
- Steve Furniss (born 1952), American swimmer

== See also ==
- Furness (disambiguation)
