= Keith Schow =

Australian rules footballer

Personal information
- Full name: Keith Hansen Schow
- Born: 3 December 1930
- Died: 3 November 1988 (aged 57); Huskisson, New South Wales
- Original team: Queanbeyan Juniors
- Height: 180 cm (5 ft 11 in)
- Weight: 76 kg (168 lb)

Playing career^{1}
Years	Club	Games (Goals)
1949–50	Queanbeyan	
1951–52	Collingwood	1 (0)
1953–55	Queanbeyan-Acton	
1956–58	St George	
1959–61	Queanbeyan	
1962–64	Turner	
- ^{1} Playing statistics correct to the end of 1964.

Career highlights
- 1950 Mulrooney Medal; 1953 & 1954 premierships (Queanbeyan-Acton)

Keith Hansen Schow (3 December 1930 – 3 November 1988) was an Australian rules footballer who played with Collingwood in the Victorian Football League (VFL).

== Career ==
=== Early career ===
Schow started his career at Queanbeyan, in the Canberra Australian National Football League. He was joint winner of the Mulrooney Medal in 1950, at the age of 19. Also in 1950, Schow represented Canberra at the Brisbane Carnival.

=== Collingwood years ===
A defender, Schow joined Collingwood in 1951 but had to wait until the 1952 VFL season to make his league debut, in the club's round 10 win over South Melbourne at Lake Oval. During the game he suffered a bruised thigh, which ruled him out of contention for Collingwood's next fixture. He didn't get another chance at senior level and instead played in the seconds for the rest of the season.

=== Queanbeyan, St George & Turner ===
From 1953 to 1955, Schow played for Queanbeyan-Acton. He was a member of their 1953 and 1954 premiership sides.

He then played for Sydney club St George from 1956 to 1958, as captain-coach for the last two seasons. While in Sydney, Schow was a New South Wales interstate representative.

In 1959, Schow returned to Queanbeyan, which had split from Acton. He was captain-coach for three years and steered them to a grand final in 1961, which they lost narrowly to Ainslie, by eight points.

Schow was playing coach of Turner (now Belconnen) from 1962 to 1964.

He died from illness on 3 November 1988.
