= Demaine =

Demaine or de Maine is a surname. Notable people with the surname include:

- Erik Demaine (born 1981), Canadian computer scientist, son of Martin
- Martin Demaine (born 1942), American artist and computer scientist, father of Erik
- Mike Demaine (1948–2013), Australian footballer (Australian rules)
- Paul A. D. de Maine (1924–1999), American computer scientist
- Robert deMaine (born 1969), American cellist
- William Demaine (1859–1939), Australian politician
- David Demaine (1942–2025), English footballer

== See also ==
- Demaine, Saskatchewan, hamlet in Saskatchewan, Canada
