= Ray Donnellan =

Australian rules footballer

Personal information
- Full name: Ray Donnellan
- Born: 30 December 1926
- Died: 9 July 2008 (aged 81)
- Original team: East Brunswick CYMS (CYMSFA)
- Height: 179 cm (5 ft 10 in)
- Weight: 73 kg (161 lb)
- Position: Centre

Playing career
Years	Club	Games (Goals)
1949–1951	Fitzroy (VFL)	40 (0)
1953–1956	Manuka (CANFL)	
1957–1960	Ainslie (CANFL)	

Career highlights
- Runner-up Mulrooney Medal: 1953; Manuka premiership team: 1955; Ainslie premiership teams: 1958, 1959

Ray Donnellan (30 December 1926 – 9 July 2008) was an Australian rules footballer. He was born into a footballing family, with his relatives including Steve and Frank Donnellan. He played with the Fitzroy in the Victorian Football League (VFL) between 1949 and 1951, appearing in a total of 40 games.

In 1953, Donnellan moved to the ACT where he played for the Manuka Football Club in the Canberra Australian National Football League (CANFL). He was runner-up in the Mulrooney Medal in his first season, and in 1955 won a premiership the following year as Manuka's captain-coach. He also captained the CANFL to wins in representative games against the NSWANFL and QANFL. Donnellan switched to Ainslie for the 1957 season as captain-coach. He and the club won consecutive premierships in 1958–59, and also made the grand final in 1960 losing to Eastlake. Donnellan moved to Acton in 1961, as non-playing coach.

Outside of football, Donnellan worked as a public servant with the federal Department of Territories and its predecessors. He worked in the areas of parks and recreation, including as superintendent of Lake Burley Griffin for a time, and was involved in organisation of the 1977 Pacific Conference Games and the establishment of the Australian Institute of Sport (AIS). Donnellan was also an occasional sportswriter for The Canberra Times, writing mainly on football issues. His nephew Luke Donnellan became a politician in Victoria.
