= John Furniss =

John Furniss may refer to:

- John Furniss (priest) (1809–1865), English Roman Catholic priest
- John Furniss (costume designer) (born 1935), British costume designer
- John Brian Furniss (1934–2013), English cricketer
- Jack Furniss (John Kitchener Furniss, 1914–2003), Australian rules footballer
