= Neil Conlan =

Personal information
- Full name: Neil Conlan
- Born: 7 August 1936; Hobart, Tasmania
- Died: 22 July 1978 (aged 42); Canberra, ACT
- Position: Forward

Playing career
Years	Club	Games (Goals)
1953–1958	New Town/Glenorchy	120 (-)
1959–1966	Devonport	
1967–1973	Manuka	

Representative team honours
Years	Team	Games (Goals)
	Tasmania	25 (-)

Neil Conlan (7 August 1935 – 22 July 1978) was an Australian football player from Tasmania. Conlan played as a forward. Conlan played in the Tasmania Australian rules football team that defeated the Victoria Australian rules football team on 13 July 1960 at York Park, Launceston. He captain-coached Devonport.

Neil Conlan's son Michael Conlan played 210 games for the Fitzroy Football Club.
