= Neil Lewthwaite =

Australian rules footballer

Personal information
- Full name: Neil Valentine Lewthwaite
- Born: 11 August 1939
- Died: 3 October 2024 (aged 85); Canberra, ACT
- Original team: Ivanhoe Amateurs
- Height: 175 cm (5 ft 9 in)
- Weight: 72 kg (159 lb)

Playing career^{1}
Years	Club	Games (Goals)
1961	South Melbourne	9 (0)
- ^{1} Playing statistics correct to the end of 1961.

Neil Valentine Lewthwaite (11 August 1939 – 3 October 2024) was an Australian rules footballer who played with South Melbourne in the Victorian Football League (VFL).

Before he came to South Melbourne, Lewthwaite played for Ivanhoe Amateurs, in the Victorian Amateur Football Association. An Ivanhoe best and fairest winner in 1959, Lewthwaite was a member of the Victorian Amateurs team that competed in that year's AAFC Perth Carnival, then represented the VAFA again in 1960 and earned All-Australian selection.

Lewthwaite made nine appearances for South Melbourne in the 1961 VFL season.

For the rest of his career, Lewthwaite played for Acton in the Canberra Australian National Football League. Lewthwaite, who was playing coach from 1966 to 1968, remained at Acton until early in the 1972 season, when he retired after bringing up 200 games. He won the Mulrooney Medal in 1967.
