= Electoral results for the Division of Lalor =

Australian division election results

This is a list of electoral results for the Division of Lalor in Australian federal elections from the division's creation in 1949 until the present.

== Members ==
Member	Party	Term
Reg Pollard	Labor	1949–1966
Mervyn Lee	Liberal	1966–1969
Jim Cairns	Labor	1969–1977
Barry Jones	Labor	1977–1998
Julia Gillard	Labor	1998–2013
Joanne Ryan	Labor	2013–present

== Election results ==
=== Elections in the 2020s ===
==== 2025 ====
2025 Australian federal election: Lalor
Party	Candidate	Votes	%	±%
Labor	Joanne Ryan	43,284	43.60	−0.53
Liberal	Mira D'Silva	25,869	26.06	+1.14
Greens	Owen Parris	15,181	15.29	+4.94
One Nation	Jason Oosthuizen	6,986	7.04	+3.06
Family First	Matthew Emerson	4,578	4.61	+4.61
Independent	Aijaz Moinuddin	2,101	2.12	−0.67
Libertarian	Patrizia Barcatta	1,285	1.29	−2.57
Total formal votes		99,284	96.02	+2.13
Informal votes		4,120	3.98	−2.13
Turnout		103,404	90.31	+11.87
Two-party-preferred result
Labor	Joanne Ryan	62,761	63.21	+0.42
Liberal	Mira D'Silva	36,523	36.79	−0.42
Labor hold		Swing	+0.42	

==== 2022 ====
2022 Australian federal election: Lalor
Party	Candidate	Votes	%	±%
Labor	Joanne Ryan	39,047	44.11	−7.47
Liberal	Ravi Gaddipati	22,083	24.95	−5.13
Greens	Jack Boddeke	9,192	10.38	+2.41
United Australia	Juanita Paterson	6,340	7.16	+2.27
One Nation	James Ingarfill	3,489	3.94	+3.94
Liberal Democrats	Patrizia Barcatta	3,403	3.84	+3.84
Independent (United People's Party)	Aijaz Moinuddin	2,535	2.86	+1.72
Victorian Socialists	Claudio Uribe	1,482	1.67	+1.67
Federation	Peter Malliaros	951	1.07	+1.07
Total formal votes		88,522	93.90	−1.62
Informal votes		5,752	6.10	+1.62
Turnout		94,274	88.15	−0.62
Two-party-preferred result
Labor	Joanne Ryan	55,613	62.82	+0.36
Liberal	Ravi Gaddipati	32,909	37.18	−0.36
Labor hold		Swing	+0.36	

Alluvial diagram for preference flows in the seat of Lalor in the 2022 federal election. indicates at what stage the winning candidate had over 50% of the votes and was declared the winner.

=== Elections in the 2010s ===
==== 2019 ====
2019 Australian federal election: Lalor
Party	Candidate	Votes	%	±%
Labor	Joanne Ryan	48,332	51.70	−0.86
Liberal	Gayle Murphy	28,209	30.18	−0.05
Greens	Jay Dessi	7,273	7.78	−1.83
United Australia	Jeffrey Robinson	4,451	4.76	+4.76
Australia First	Susan Jakobi	4,094	4.38	+1.28
	Aijaz Moinuddin	1,119	1.20	+1.20
Total formal votes		93,478	95.57	+0.12
Informal votes		4,337	4.43	−0.12
Turnout		97,815	91.60	+4.05
Two-party-preferred result
Labor	Joanne Ryan	58,341	62.41	−1.78
Liberal	Gayle Murphy	35,137	37.59	+1.78
Labor hold		Swing	−1.78	

==== 2016 ====
2016 Australian federal election: Lalor
Party	Candidate	Votes	%	±%
Labor	Joanne Ryan	55,302	51.80	+6.63
Liberal	Gayle Murphy	33,070	30.98	+1.72
Greens	Daniel Sova	10,471	9.81	+3.80
Rise Up Australia	Marion Vale	4,685	4.39	+2.59
Australia First	Susan Jakobi	3,232	3.03	+3.03
Total formal votes		106,760	95.46	+2.09
Informal votes		5,080	4.54	−2.09
Turnout		111,840	90.48	−2.65
Two-party-preferred result
Labor	Joanne Ryan	67,731	63.44	+1.28
Liberal	Gayle Murphy	39,029	36.56	−1.28
Labor hold		Swing	+1.28	

==== 2013 ====
2013 Australian federal election: Lalor
Party	Candidate	Votes	%	±%
Labor	Joanne Ryan	42,184	45.17	−18.78
Liberal	Nihal Samara	27,321	29.26	+6.13
Greens	Beck Sheffield-Brotherton	5,615	6.01	−1.14
Palmer United	Joe Zappia	5,416	5.80	+5.80
Sex Party	Angel Harwood	3,004	3.22	+3.22
Family First	Daryl Pollard	2,653	2.84	−0.07
Independent	Nathan Mullins	1,842	1.97	+1.97
Democratic Labour	Michael Freeman	1,768	1.89	+1.89
Rise Up Australia	Marion Vale	1,684	1.80	+1.80
Christians	Geoff Rogers	1,535	1.64	+1.64
Stable Population	Jonathan Page	359	0.38	+0.38
Total formal votes		93,381	93.37	−0.88
Informal votes		6,630	6.63	+0.88
Turnout		100,011	93.12	+0.23
Two-party-preferred result
Labor	Joanne Ryan	58,041	62.16	−9.96
Liberal	Nihal Samara	35,340	37.84	+9.96
Labor hold		Swing	−9.96	

==== 2010 ====
2010 Australian federal election: Lalor
Party	Candidate	Votes	%	±%
Labor	Julia Gillard	66,298	64.25	+4.36
Liberal	Sheridan Ingram	23,791	23.06	−6.71
Greens	Peter Taylor	7,045	6.83	+2.81
Family First	Lori McLean	2,880	2.79	−1.61
Secular	Paul Sheehan	881	0.85	+0.85
Independent	Joanne Clarke	708	0.69	+0.69
Independent	Brian Shaw	659	0.64	+0.64
Revolutionary Socialist	Van Rudd	516	0.50	+0.50
Independent	Marc Aussie-Stone	410	0.40	+0.40
Total formal votes		103,188	93.76	−2.75
Informal votes		6,864	6.24	+2.75
Turnout		110,052	94.04	−1.38
Two-party-preferred result
Labor	Julia Gillard	74,452	72.15	+6.62
Liberal	Sheridan Ingram	28,736	27.85	−6.62
Labor hold		Swing	+6.62	

=== Elections in the 2000s ===
==== 2007 ====
2007 Australian federal election: Lalor
Party	Candidate	Votes	%	±%
Labor	Julia Gillard	57,208	59.89	+6.64
Liberal	Peter Curtis	28,435	29.77	−7.68
Family First	Steve Gleeson	4,199	4.40	+1.22
Greens	Jay Tilley	3,836	4.02	−0.10
Democratic Labor	Libby Krepp	969	1.01	+1.01
Democrats	Roger Howe	879	0.92	−0.52
Total formal votes		95,526	96.51	+1.36
Informal votes		3,457	3.49	−1.36
Turnout		98,983	95.40	−0.04
Two-party-preferred result
Labor	Julia Gillard	62,600	65.53	+6.74
Liberal	Peter Curtis	32,936	34.47	−6.74
Labor hold		Swing	+6.74	

==== 2004 ====
2004 Australian federal election: Lalor
Party	Candidate	Votes	%	±%
Labor	Julia Gillard	43,677	53.25	−1.48
Liberal	Peter Curtis	30,715	37.45	+4.40
Greens	Malcolm Browning	3,381	4.12	−0.49
Family First	Arthur Buller	2,607	3.18	+3.18
Democrats	Roger Howe	1,182	1.44	−5.99
Citizens Electoral Council	Sally Larner	462	0.56	+0.56
Total formal votes		82,024	95.15	−0.77
Informal votes		4,184	4.85	+0.77
Turnout		86,208	95.44	+0.42
Two-party-preferred result
Labor	Julia Gillard	48,218	58.79	−3.27
Liberal	Peter Curtis	33,806	41.21	+3.27
Labor hold		Swing	−3.27	

==== 2001 ====
2001 Australian federal election: Lalor
Party	Candidate	Votes	%	±%
Labor	Julia Gillard	47,490	58.10	−3.12
Liberal	David McConnell	24,634	30.14	+4.55
Democrats	Roger Howe	6,297	7.70	+2.30
Greens	Tony Briffa	3,321	4.06	+2.30
Total formal votes		81,742	95.65	−0.99
Informal votes		3,718	4.35	+0.99
Turnout		85,460	96.20	
Two-party-preferred result
Labor	Julia Gillard	53,644	65.63	−4.19
Liberal	David McConnell	28,098	34.37	+4.19
Labor hold		Swing	−4.19	

=== Elections in the 1990s ===
==== 1998 ====
1998 Australian federal election: Lalor
Party	Candidate	Votes	%	±%
Labor	Julia Gillard	46,374	61.21	−0.63
Liberal	Cameron O'Sullivan	19,381	25.58	−2.54
Democrats	Anthony Shaw	4,090	5.40	−2.36
One Nation	John Brodel	3,127	4.13	+4.13
Unity	George Papaellinas	1,446	1.91	+1.91
Greens	Cynthia Mason	1,339	1.77	+1.77
Total formal votes		75,757	96.63	+0.03
Informal votes		2,638	3.37	−0.03
Turnout		78,395	96.43	+0.10
Two-party-preferred result
Labor	Julia Gillard	52,893	69.82	+1.31
Liberal	Cameron O'Sullivan	22,864	30.18	−1.31
Labor hold		Swing	+1.31	

==== 1996 ====
1996 Australian federal election: Lalor
Party	Candidate	Votes	%	±%
Labor	Barry Jones	43,217	61.85	−3.64
Liberal	Chris Macgregor	19,653	28.12	−0.97
Democrats	Leigh Hebbard	5,423	7.76	+4.83
Natural Law	Juliana Kendi	1,585	2.27	+1.34
Total formal votes		69,878	96.60	−0.10
Informal votes		2,458	3.40	+0.10
Turnout		72,336	96.32	−0.43
Two-party-preferred result
Labor	Barry Jones	47,729	68.51	−0.51
Liberal	Chris Macgregor	21,941	31.49	+0.51
Labor hold		Swing	−0.51	

==== 1993 ====
1993 Australian federal election: Lalor
Party	Candidate	Votes	%	±%
Labor	Barry Jones	47,390	64.29	+16.26
Liberal	Anne Canterbury	22,400	30.39	−1.29
Democrats	Carla Stacey	2,113	2.87	−7.17
Call to Australia	Anthony Golding	1,126	1.53	−1.44
Natural Law	Floyd Evans	682	0.93	+0.93
Total formal votes		73,711	96.75	+0.79
Informal votes		2,473	3.25	−0.79
Turnout		76,184	96.76	
Two-party-preferred result
Labor	Barry Jones	49,628	67.35	+8.38
Liberal	Anne Canterbury	24,055	32.65	−8.38
Labor hold		Swing	+8.38	

==== 1990 ====
1990 Australian federal election: Lalor
Party	Candidate	Votes	%	±%
Labor	Barry Jones	30,879	48.0	−15.8
Liberal	Rae Medlock	20,367	31.7	+4.5
Democrats	George Demetriou	6,455	10.0	+1.1
Independent	Peter Ryan	4,685	7.3	+7.3
Call to Australia	Ron Moffett	1,908	3.0	+3.0
Total formal votes		64,294	96.0	
Informal votes		2,701	4.0	
Turnout		66,995	96.4	
Two-party-preferred result
Labor	Barry Jones	37,832	59.0	−10.5
Liberal	Rae Medlock	26,321	41.0	+10.5
Labor hold		Swing	−10.5	

=== Elections in the 1980s ===
==== 1987 ====
1987 Australian federal election: Lalor
Party	Candidate	Votes	%	±%
Labor	Barry Jones	42,087	63.8	−3.4
Liberal	Darren Farquhar	17,966	27.2	+0.1
Democrats	Heather Jeffcoat	5,899	8.9	+4.7
Total formal votes		65,962	93.4	
Informal votes		4,676	6.6	
Turnout		70,628	95.2	
Two-party-preferred result
Labor	Barry Jones	45,824	69.5	−0.5
Liberal	Darren Farquhar	20,118	30.5	+0.5
Labor hold		Swing	−0.5	

==== 1984 ====
1984 Australian federal election: Lalor
Party	Candidate	Votes	%	±%
Labor	Barry Jones	38,024	67.2	+3.1
Liberal	Mark Pallett	15,306	27.1	−3.0
Democrats	Barry McLeod	2,383	4.2	−0.7
Democratic Labor	Gail de Rozario	839	1.5	+1.5
Total formal votes		56,552	90.5	
Informal votes		5,902	9.5	
Turnout		62,454	95.7	
Two-party-preferred result
Labor	Barry Jones	39,569	70.0	+2.1
Liberal	Mark Pallett	16,982	30.0	−2.1
Labor hold		Swing	+2.1	

==== 1983 ====
1983 Australian federal election: Lalor
Party	Candidate	Votes	%	±%
Labor	Barry Jones	55,640	68.0	−0.3
Liberal	John Fahey	21,442	26.2	+0.6
Democrats	Ivan Pollock	4,040	4.9	−1.1
Socialist Workers	Helen Said	719	0.9	+0.9
Total formal votes		81,841	97.6	
Informal votes		2,914	3.4	
Turnout		84,755	96.0	
Two-party-preferred result
Labor	Barry Jones		71.8	−0.1
Liberal	John Fahey		28.2	+0.1
Labor hold		Swing	−0.1	

==== 1980 ====
1980 Australian federal election: Lalor
Party	Candidate	Votes	%	±%
Labor	Barry Jones	50,509	68.3	+17.8
Liberal	Thomas Meskos	18,944	25.6	−2.5
Democrats	Ivan Pollock	4,446	6.0	−3.9
Total formal votes		73,899	96.0	
Informal votes		3,103	4.0	
Turnout		77,002	95.6	
Two-party-preferred result
Labor	Barry Jones		71.9	+14.3
Liberal	Thomas Meskos		28.1	−14.3
Labor hold		Swing	+14.3	

=== Elections in the 1970s ===
==== 1977 ====
1977 Australian federal election: Lalor
Party	Candidate	Votes	%	±%
Labor	Barry Jones	31,693	50.5	−7.1
Liberal	Harley Dickinson	17,633	28.1	−7.0
Democrats	Charles Skidmore	6,196	9.9	+9.9
Democratic Labor	Denis Bilston	5,502	8.8	+1.6
Independent	Rosalba Vicari	1,002	1.6	+1.6
Independent	Jeffrey Day	729	1.2	+1.2
Total formal votes		62,755	94.6	
Informal votes		3,561	5.4	
Turnout		66,316	96.4	
Two-party-preferred result
Labor	Barry Jones		57.6	−1.6
Liberal	Harley Dickinson		42.4	+1.6
Labor hold		Swing	−1.6	

==== 1975 ====
1975 Australian federal election: Lalor
Party	Candidate	Votes	%	±%
Labor	Jim Cairns	43,426	59.3	−5.3
Liberal	Francis Purcell	24,467	33.4	+7.6
Democratic Labor	Denis Bilston	5,289	7.2	−0.7
Total formal votes		73,182	96.6	
Informal votes		2,543	3.4	
Turnout		75,725	94.8	
Two-party-preferred result
Labor	Jim Cairns		60.9	−6.4
Liberal	Francis Purcell		39.1	+6.4
Labor hold		Swing	−6.4	

==== 1974 ====
1974 Australian federal election: Lalor
Party	Candidate	Votes	%	±%
Labor	Jim Cairns	44,005	64.6	+2.1
Liberal	Francis Purcell	17,613	25.8	+0.9
Democratic Labor	John Bacon	5,398	7.9	−3.8
Australia	William Inglis	1,128	1.7	+1.7
Total formal votes		68,144	96.7	
Informal votes		2,338	3.3	
Turnout		70,482	96.4	
Two-party-preferred result
Labor	Jim Cairns		67.3	+2.3
Liberal	Francis Purcell		32.7	−2.3
Labor hold		Swing	+2.3	

==== 1972 ====
1972 Australian federal election: Lalor
Party	Candidate	Votes	%	±%
Labor	Jim Cairns	35,677	62.5	+5.6
Liberal	Joseph Sheen	14,189	24.9	+0.2
Democratic Labor	John Bacon	6,698	11.7	−3.6
National Socialist	Cass Young	489	0.9	+0.9
Total formal votes		57,053	95.6	
Informal votes		2,432	4.1	
Turnout		59,485	95.0	
Two-party-preferred result
Labor	Jim Cairns		65.0	+4.1
Liberal	Joseph Sheen		35.0	−4.1
Labor hold		Swing	+4.1	

=== Elections in the 1960s ===
==== 1969 ====
1969 Australian federal election: Lalor
Party	Candidate	Votes	%	±%
Labor	Jim Cairns	26,807	56.9	+3.9
Liberal	Vaclav Ubl	11,631	24.7	+1.7
Democratic Labor	John Bacon	7,227	15.3	+1.3
Independent	Tom Gilhooley	1,447	3.1	+3.1
Total formal votes		47,112	94.1	
Informal votes		2,959	5.9	
Turnout		50,071	94.2	
Two-party-preferred result
Labor	Jim Cairns		60.9	+4.8
Liberal	Vaclav Ubl		39.1	−4.8
Labor gain from Liberal		Swing	+4.8	

==== 1966 ====
1966 Australian federal election: Lalor
Party	Candidate	Votes	%	±%
Labor	Reg Pollard	45,243	46.2	−8.2
Liberal	Mervyn Lee	29,211	29.8	+1.3
Democratic Labor	Jim Marmion	13,706	14.0	−3.1
Independent	Paul de Tert	6,914	7.1	+7.1
Liberal Reform Group	Victor Parsons	1,568	1.6	+1.6
Independent	Michael Wood	681	0.7	+0.7
Independent	Peter Spencer	592	0.6	+0.6
Total formal votes		97,915	91.2	
Informal votes		9,480	8.8	
Turnout		107,395	95.0	
Two-party-preferred result
Liberal	Mervyn Lee	49,650	50.7	+7.7
Labor	Reg Pollard	48,265	49.3	−7.7
Liberal gain from Labor		Swing	+7.7	

==== 1963 ====
1963 Australian federal election: Lalor
Party	Candidate	Votes	%	±%
Labor	Reg Pollard	49,383	54.4	+0.5
Liberal	Bernard Treseder	25,831	28.5	+4.2
Democratic Labor	Jim Marmion	15,507	17.1	+0.9
Total formal votes		90,721	98.0	
Informal votes		1,892	2.0	
Turnout		92,613	96.1	
Two-party-preferred result
Labor	Reg Pollard		57.0	−0.8
Liberal	Bernard Treseder		43.0	+0.8
Labor hold		Swing	−0.8	

==== 1961 ====
1961 Australian federal election: Lalor
Party	Candidate	Votes	%	±%
Labor	Reg Pollard	42,906	53.9	+2.7
Liberal	Peter Kemp	19,324	24.3	−5.4
Democratic Labor	John Donnellon	12,870	16.2	−2.8
Centre	Kenneth Agius	4,431	5.6	+5.6
Total formal votes		79,531	96.9	
Informal votes		2,539	3.1	
Turnout		82,070	94.9	
Two-party-preferred result
Labor	Reg Pollard		57.8	+4.8
Liberal	Peter Kemp		42.2	−4.8
Labor hold		Swing	+4.8	

=== Elections in the 1950s ===
==== 1958 ====
1958 Australian federal election: Lalor
Party	Candidate	Votes	%	±%
Labor	Reg Pollard	30,872	51.2	+2.1
Liberal	Peter Kemp	17,904	29.7	−7.5
Democratic Labor	John Donnellon	11,475	19.0	+5.4
Total formal votes		60,251	97.4	
Informal votes		1,628	2.6	
Turnout		61,879	94.8	
Two-party-preferred result
Labor	Reg Pollard		53.0	+2.1
Liberal	Peter Kemp		47.0	−2.1
Labor hold		Swing	+2.1	

==== 1955 ====
1955 Australian federal election: Lalor
Party	Candidate	Votes	%	±%
Labor	Reg Pollard	21,036	49.1	−11.1
Liberal	Peter Kemp	15,953	37.2	−2.6
Labor (A-C)	William Lloyd	5,845	13.6	+13.6
Total formal votes		42,834	97.2	
Informal votes		1,222	2.8	
Turnout		44,056	93.4	
Two-party-preferred result
Labor	Reg Pollard	21,821	50.9	−9.3
Liberal	Peter Kemp	21,013	49.1	+9.3
Labor hold		Swing	−9.3	

==== 1954 ====
1954 Australian federal election: Lalor
Party	Candidate	Votes	%	±%
Labor	Reg Pollard	30,232	58.3	+3.4
Liberal	George Morison	21,598	41.7	−3.4
Total formal votes		51,830	98.8	
Informal votes		629	1.2	
Turnout		52,459	95.6	
Labor hold		Swing	+3.4	

==== 1951 ====
1951 Australian federal election: Lalor
Party	Candidate	Votes	%	±%
Labor	Reg Pollard	23,278	54.9	+3.3
Liberal	Allen Bateman	19,103	45.1	−3.3
Total formal votes		42,381	98.5	
Informal votes		635	1.5	
Turnout		43,016	95.2	
Labor hold		Swing	+3.3	

=== Elections in the 1940s ===
==== 1949 ====
1949 Australian federal election: Lalor
Party	Candidate	Votes	%	±%
Labor	Reg Pollard	20,264	51.6	−5.4
Liberal	John Bellair	18,970	48.4	+5.4
Total formal votes		39,234	98.4	
Informal votes		619	1.6	
Turnout		39,853	94.5	
Labor notional hold		Swing	−5.4	
