= Aldo Dipetta =

Australian rules footballer

Personal information
- Full name: Aldo Dipetta
- Born: 3 January 1972 (age 54)
- Original team: Springvale (VFA)
- Height: 175 cm (5 ft 9 in)
- Weight: 80 kg (176 lb)

Playing career^{1}
Years	Club	Games (Goals)
1990–1992	St Kilda	5 (3)
1993	Sydney Swans	2 (0)
Total		7 (3)
- ^{1} Playing statistics correct to the end of 1993.

Aldo Dipetta (born 3 January 1972) is a former Australian rules footballer who played with St Kilda and the Sydney Swans in the Australian Football League (AFL).

Dipetta played his early football with Victorian Football Association (VFA) club Springvale and at Mazenod College.

Dipetta made three appearances for St Kilda late in the 1990 AFL season, didn't feature at all in 1991, then played another two league games in 1992.

In 1993 Dipetta moved to the ACT and played with AFL Canberra side Ainslie, from where he was drafted by the Sydney Swans, with pick 16 of the 1993 Mid-Season Draft. He played twice for the Swans in 1993.

Dipetta played over 100 games with Ainslie until his final season in 2001.

He is now a podiatrist in Canberra.
