= Alan Stevens (footballer) =

Australian rules footballer

Personal information
- Full name: Alan Keith Stevens
- Nickname: Ginty
- Born: 5 August 1923; Coogee, New South Wales
- Died: 2 November 2010 (aged 87)
- Height: 183 cm (6 ft 0 in)
- Weight: 80 kg (176 lb)

Playing career^{1}
Years	Club	Games (Goals)
1940–1941	Ainslie	
1942–1944	Eastlake-Manuka	
1945	Eastlake	
1946–1947	Ainslie	
1948–1950	St Kilda	22 (1)
1952–1953	Ainslie	
- ^{1} Playing statistics correct to the end of 1953.

Career highlights
- Ainslie best and fairest – 1941, 1946 & 1947; Ainslie premiership player – 1946, 1947 & 1952; Ainslie premiership coach – 1947 & 1952; Eastlake premiership player – 1945; Mulrooney Medal – 1946

Alan Keith Stevens (5 August 1923 – 2 November 2010) was an Australian rules footballer who played with St Kilda in the Victorian Football League (VFL). He also had a noted career in the Canberra Australian National Football League, with Ainslie, Eastlake-Manuka and Eastlake.

== Career ==
=== Early career during the war ===
Stevens, a defender, spent his first two years of senior football with Canberra club Ainslie.

He won Ainslie's best and fairest award and finished third in voting for the Mulrooney Medal in 1941, his second season.

From 1942 to 1944, Stevens played for the merged Eastlake-Manuka combination.

The merger ended in 1945 and Stevens played for Eastlake that season. He was named amongst Eastlake's best players in their one-point win over Navy in the 1945 grand final.

=== New captain of Ainslie ===
Stevens returned to Ainslie in 1946, as club captain. He had a triumphant return, ending the season with a premiership, Mulrooney Medal and another Ainslie best and fairest.

The following year he was given the additional responsibility of being playing coach and steered Ainslie to another premiership. Stevens, who captained Canberra at the 1947 Hobart Carnival, also won a third club best and fairest award.

=== Three seasons with St Kilda ===
Stevens played for St Kilda from 1948 to 1950, during which time he amassed 22 league appearances.

While in Victoria he was a state representative, in 1948.

=== Final years at Ainslie ===
Stevens finished his career back at Ainslie, where he was playing coach for two more seasons, after moving back to Canberra late in 1951.

He led Ainslie to another premiership in 1952, when they were undefeated all year.
