= Roy Williams (Australian footballer, born 1929) =

Australian rules footballer (1929–1988)

Personal information
- Full name: Roy Williams
- Born: 3 March 1929
- Died: 29 May 1988 (aged 59); Canberra
- Original team: Queanbeyan
- Height: 182 cm (6 ft 0 in)
- Weight: 94.5 kg (208 lb)

Playing career^{1}
Years	Club	Games (Goals)
1952	Collingwood	8 (7)
- ^{1} Playing statistics correct to the end of 1952.

Roy Williams (3 March 1929 – 29 May 1988) was an Australian rules footballer who played with Collingwood in the Victorian Football League (VFL).
