= Mervyn Lee =

Australian politician

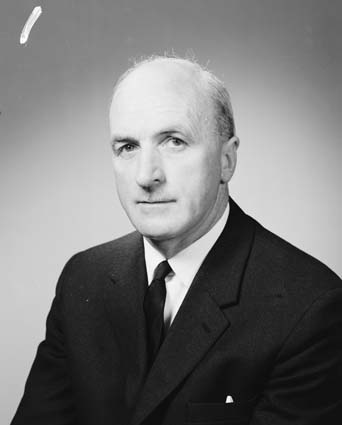

Member of the Australian Parliament for Lalor
- In office 26 November 1966 – 25 October 1969
- Preceded by: Reg Pollard
- Succeeded by: Jim Cairns

Personal details
- Born: 18 August 1920 Broadford, Victoria
- Died: 13 December 2009 (aged 89) Kilmore, Victoria
- Party: Liberal Party of Australia
- Occupation: Drapery and hardware merchant

Mervyn William Lee (18 August 1920 – 13 December 2009) was an Australian politician who served as the Liberal member for Lalor from 1966 to 1969. He died in December 2009 at the age of 89.

== Early life and war service ==
Born in Broadford, Victoria in August 1920, he was educated at Kingswood College in Melbourne before becoming a Commonwealth public servant. After serving in the Royal Australian Navy in World War II 1941–46, he became a drapery and hardware merchant. He played Australian rules football for Acton in the Canberra Australian National Football League and while captain of Acton in 1947 won the Mulrooney Medal.

== Political career ==
In 1966, he was elected to the Australian House of Representatives as the Liberal member for Lalor, defeating long-serving Labor member Reg Pollard.

Prior to the 1969 election, a redistribution shrunk Lalor to a quarter of its size in south-western Melbourne. The redistribution erased his majority and gave Labor a notional six-percent majority. Broadford and the surrounding areas where Lee was based in was also transferred from Lalor to the Division of Bendigo. As a result, Lee went to unsuccessfully contest Bendigo instead. He had early considered standing as the Liberal candidate at the 1969 Bendigo by-election, which would have required a by-election in Lalor.

Parliament of Australia
Preceded by Reg Pollard	Member for Lalor; 1966–1969	Succeeded by Jim Cairns
