= Keith Miller (footballer, born 1953) =

Australian rules footballer

Personal information
- Full name: Keith. J. Miller
- Born: 14 February 1953 (age 73)
- Height: 188 cm (6 ft 2 in)
- Weight: 84 kg (185 lb)

Playing career^{1}
Years	Club	Games (Goals)
1972–1973	Echuca	
1974	Geelong	2 (0)
1975	Echuca	
1976–1977	Turvey Park	
1978–1985	Eastlake	137
- ^{1} Playing statistics correct to the end of 1985.

Career highlights
- Echuca best and fairest 1972 and 1973; Turvey Park best and fairest 1976 and 1977; Eastlake premiership coach 1978; Eastlake best and fairest 1979, 1980 and 1981; Mulrooney Medalist 1979 and 1981; Alex Jesaulenko Medalist 1982

Keith Miller (born 14 February 1953) is a former Australian rules footballer who played with Geelong in the Victorian Football League (VFL).

== Geelong ==
Miller, a ruckman from Echuca, was at Geelong for one season, in 1974. On his league debut, in the opening round of the season against Footscray, Miller came on as a reserve in the last quarter. His only other appearance came in round three, when Geelong beat Melbourne at the MCG. Miller started the game on this occasion.

== Country football ==
He returned to Echuca in 1975, then spent two seasons with Turvey Park, a Wagga Wagga-based club in the South Western District Football League (SWDFL). In 1977 he was runner-up in the SWDFL's Gammage Medal and played in Turvey Park's premiership team, as an assistant coach.

== ACTAFL ==
In 1978, Miller became captain-coach of ACT Australian Football League club Eastlake, which he led to a premiership in his first season, with a grand final win over Kevin Neale's Ainslie. The following year he won a Mulrooney Medal as well as the first of three successive club best and fairest awards. He spent the 1980 season as a player only, then at the end of the year was appointed coach of Belconnen. Before the 1981 season began, Miller resigned as coach and returned to Eastlake. He won a second Mulrooney Medal in 1981 and was an Alex Jesaulenko Medalist in 1982 for his performance in Eastlake's grand final loss to Ainslie. Returning as coach in 1985, it would be his last season playing for the club. His final year at Eastlake in 1986 was as a non playing coach.
