= John Davies (Australian footballer) =

Australian rules footballer

Personal information
- Full name: John Edward Davies
- Born: 22 August 1943; Geelong, Victoria
- Died: 23 December 1986 (aged 43); Canberra, ACT
- Original team: Geelong Amateurs / Geelong College
- Height: 183 cm (6 ft 0 in)
- Weight: 80 kg (176 lb)

Playing career^{1}
Years	Club	Games (Goals)
1966–69	Geelong	38 (25)
- ^{1} Playing statistics correct to the end of 1969.

Career highlights
- 1970–1972: Captain-coach Ainslie Football Club; 1970: CANFL Premiership

John Edward Davies (22 August 1943 – 23 December 1986) was an Australian rules footballer who played with Geelong in the Victorian Football League (VFL).
