= Michael Kennedy (footballer, born 1967) =

Australian rules footballer

Personal information
- Full name: Michael James Kennedy
- Born: 3 February 1967 (age 59)
- Original team: Queanbeyan Tigers (ACTAFL)
- Draft: No. 41, 1987 national draft
- Height: 175 cm (5 ft 9 in)
- Weight: 69 kg (152 lb)
- Position: Rover

Playing career^{1}
Years	Club	Games (Goals)
1988–90	Brisbane Bears (VFL)	23 (3)
1991–93	West Adelaide (SANFL)	? (?)
- ^{1} Playing statistics correct to the end of 1993.

Career highlights
- VFL debut with Brisbane Bears on 3 April 1988 v Collingwood at Carrara Oval; SANFL debut with West Adelaide on 18 May 1991; ACTAFL Mulrooney Medalist 1994; Queanbeyan Tigers Captain-Coach 1995

Michael James Kennedy (born 3 February 1967) is a former Australian rules football player who played for the Brisbane Bears in the Victorian Football League (VFL).

Kennedy played his early football with Queanbeyan in the Australian Capital Territory Australian Football League (ACTAFL) and was an ACT representative at the 1988 Adelaide Bicentennial Carnival. Drafted by Brisbane at the 1987 VFL draft, Kennedy made his senior VFL debut in 1988 against Collingwood Football Club and in all spent three seasons with Brisbane for 23 games.

Delisted by Brisbane at the end of the 1990 AFL season, Kennedy was recruited by South Australian National Football League (SANFL) club West Adelaide and made his senior SANFL debut in May 1991 and played a key role in West Adelaide's run to the 1991 SANFL Grand Final, where they lost in a spiteful match to North Adelaide Football Club.

Kennedy left West Adelaide and returned to Queanbeyan in 1994, winning the ACTAFL's Best and Fairest award, the Mulrooney Medal, in his first season. He was appointed Queanbeyan captain-coach in 1995, lasting one season before continuing in a playing capacity until his retirement in 1997.
