= Robert Anderson (Australian rules footballer) =

Australian rules footballer

Personal information
- Born: 19 August 1959 (age 67); Canberra
- Original team: Queanbeyan (ACT)

Playing career^{1}
Years	Club	Games (Goals)
1980, 1983–1984	Footscray	16 (6)
- ^{1} Playing statistics correct to the end of 1984.

Robert Anderson (born 19 August 1959) is a former Australian rules footballer. He played with Footscray, now known as the Western Bulldogs, in a variety of positions, but mostly on the wing and flanks. He was born and raised in Canberra and was recruited form local club Queanbeyan. He joined the Bulldogs at the start of 1980, Royce Hart's first year as coach. This was a tumultuous period for the club during which Hart delisted a number of players for not reaching the requisite fitness level, including Brian Wilson who went on and win a Brownlow Medal with Melbourne. Anderson returned to Queanbeyan at the end of his first season, mainly because of injury, but was enticed back to the Bulldogs three years later for another two-year stint.

After retiring at a relatively early age from VFL football, he returned to the Queanbeyan Tigers and with his long raking left foot, was a key player in no less than four premierships from 1985 to 1994. His playing measurements were 178 cm and 78 kg. He played 16 games in three seasons with the Bulldogs.
