= Robert Whatman =

Australian rules footballer (born 1951)

Personal information
- Full name: Robert Bruce Whatman
- Born: 29 January 1951 (age 75)
- Original team: Manuka

Playing career^{1}
| Years | Club | Games (Goals) |
| 1972–1974 | Geelong | 34 (17) |
- ^{1} Playing statistics correct to the end of 1974.

Robert Bruce Whatman (born 29 January 1951) is a former Australian rules footballer who played for Geelong in the Victorian Football League (now known as the Australian Football League).

Whatman is best remembered for a game against Collingwood at Kardinia Park in August 1972. He was one of the two reserves for Geelong, who were 31 points behind at three-quarter time. Whatman came off the bench and helped spark a dramatic Geelong revival, kicking 3 goals 2 behinds in the last quarter, with Geelong kicking 7 goals 3 behinds to Collingwood's 2 goals 2 behinds and winning the game by a solitary point.
