= Peter Kenny (footballer) =

Australian rules footballer

Personal information
- Full name: Peter Kenny
- Born: 23 May 1959 (age 67)
- Original team: Manuka/Swan Districts
- Height: 183 cm (6 ft 0 in)
- Weight: 82 kg (181 lb)
- Position: Small forward

Playing career^{1}
Years	Club	Games (Goals)
1986	Carlton	11 (20)
- ^{1} Playing statistics correct to the end of 1986.

Peter Kenny (born 23 May 1959) is a former Australian rules footballer who played with Carlton in the Victorian Football League (VFL). Originally from Manuka, he played for Swan Districts in the West Australian Football League before being recruited by Carlton. After leaving Carlton, Kenny played for Williamstown in the Victorian Football Association.
