= Michael Conlan (footballer) =

Australian rules footballer

Mick Conlan

Personal information
- Full name: Michael Conlan
- Born: 20 February 1958 (age 68); Tasmania
- Original team: Manuka
- Height: 179 cm (5 ft 10 in)
- Weight: 87 kg (192 lb)

Playing career^{1}
Years	Club	Games (Goals)
1977–1989	Fitzroy	210 (395)
1991	Sandringham	3 (2)
Total		213 (397)
- ^{1} Playing statistics correct to the end of 1989.

Career highlights
- Victorian Representative (4)

Michael "Mick" Conlan (born 20 February 1958 in Tasmania, son of Neil Conlan) is a former Australian rules footballer who played in the Victorian Football League (VFL).

Born in Tasmania, Conlan played with the Manuka Football Club in the Australian Capital Territory before being recruited to the VFL by the Fitzroy Football Club. He debuted in 1977 and played mostly at half-forward or in a forward pocket wearing the number 12 guernsey. He was noted for his explosive power, and kicked numerous World of Sport "Goals of the Week", typically on bursting runs down the flanks; a particularly notable goal of the week was a Goal of the Week in 1984 in the final home-and-away round against St Kilda, where he received a knock-on from Grant Lawrie in the right forward pocket, who tapped the ball inboard to teammate Garry Wilson, who handballed the ball over his head back to Conlan, who then took on St Kilda captain and AFL Hall of Famer Trevor Barker to snap a goal on his left foot from a 45-degree angle. His emphasis on strength training and muscular physique pre-empted what was to be more common in later decades. His nicknames were "the Sherman Tank" or "Crash", with his most notable moment being kicking the winning goal during the final seconds in the 1986 Elimination Final against Essendon. He went on to play 210 games for 395 goals with the club until his retirement in 1989 (his final game being for the Reserves in their Premiership win over Geelong that year). During his career he represented Victoria in State of Origin on four occasions. Conlan kicked 10 goals in one game against Footscray in 1984.

After retirement he went on to coach Sandringham Football Club in the Victorian Football Association.

In March 2012, Conlan became the chief executive officer of AFL Queensland.
