= Alan Bloomfield =

Australian rules footballer

Personal information
- Full name: Alan Bloomfield
- Born: 12 February 1950 (age 76)
- Original team: Ainslie
- Position: Utility

Playing career^{1}
Years	Club	Games (Goals)
1970–71	North Melbourne	13 (7)
- ^{1} Playing statistics correct to the end of 1971.

Alan Bloomfield (born 12 February 1950) is a former Australian rules footballer who played with North Melbourne in the Victorian Football League (VFL). Bloomfield played as a utility. He was recruited from Ainslie Football Club in the Australian Capital Territory.

== Sources ==
- Holmesby, Russell & Main, Jim (2007). The Encyclopedia of AFL Footballers. 7th ed. Melbourne: Bas Publishing.
