= Ian Low =

Australian rules footballer

Personal information
- Full name: Ian Low
- Born: 17 March 1954 (age 72)
- Original team: Manuka
- Height: 183 cm (6 ft 0 in)
- Weight: 86 kg (190 lb)

Playing career^{1}
Years	Club	Games (Goals)
1975–79	Footscray	67 (65)
1980	Collingwood	11 (14)
Total		78 (79)
- ^{1} Playing statistics correct to the end of 1980.

Ian Low (born 17 March 1954) is a former Australian rules footballer who played for Footscray and Collingwood in the Victorian Football League (VFL).

Low started his career in the Canberra Australian National Football League and participated in Manuka's 1973 and 1974 premiership winning teams. Picked up by Footscray in 1975, he was mostly as a wingman or at half forward. He kicked 19 goals in 1976 and 20 goals the following season. In 1978, Low contributed a goal when Footscray amassed a club record 213 points against St Kilda. The club however only made the finals once, in 1976, but he got a chance to experience a prolonged finals campaign when he crossed to Collingwood in 1980. He kicked four goals in Collingwood's Semi Final win over Carlton at the MCG and was a half forward flanker in the losing 1980 VFL Grand Final side.
