= Neil Bristow =

Australian rules footballer

Personal information
- Full name: Neil Bristow
- Born: 23 November 1955 (age 70)
- Original team: Ainslie (ACTFL)/ Sale (LVFL)
- Height: 193 cm (6 ft 4 in)
- Weight: 89 kg (196 lb)

Playing career^{1}
Years	Club	Games (Goals)
1979	Footscray	10 (4)
- ^{1} Playing statistics correct to the end of 1979.

Neil Bristow (born 23 November 1955) is a former Australian rules footballer who played with Footscray in the Victorian Football League (VFL).

Originally from Ainslie Football Club in the Australian Capital Territory Football League (ACTFL), Bristow played for Latrobe Valley Football League (LVFL) club Sale before Footscray recruited him for the 1979 VFL season. Bristow made his senior VFL debut in Round One, against Melbourne at the Melbourne Cricket Ground (MCG). Bristow played ten games in 1979, the last of which in Round 14, and left Footscray at the end of the season.
