= Rob Smith (Australian footballer) =

Australian rules footballer

Personal information
- Full name: Robert Smith
- Born: 26 May 1951
- Died: 24 May 2013 (aged 61)
- Original team: Ainslie
- Height: 191 cm (6 ft 3 in)
- Weight: 84 kg (185 lb)
- Position: Forward

Playing career^{1}
Years	Club	Games (Goals)
1971–1977	North Melbourne	48 (48)
- ^{1} Playing statistics correct to the end of 1977.

Robert "Rob" Smith (26 May 1951 – 24 May 2013) was an Australian rules footballer who played with North Melbourne in the Victorian Football League (VFL).

== Biography ==
Smith was educated at Canberra High School and played his early football for Ainslie. He moved to Melbourne in 1970 to do a chartered accountants course at the Royal Melbourne Institute of Technology, with hopes also of joining a VFL club.

=== North Melbourne ===
While he awaited a clearance, Smith trained with North Melbourne, who were in a dispute with Geelong over his signature. Geelong, who had approached Smith the previous year, claimed that he had signed a form to play for their club. The CANFL were also taking a stand against clearing young players which cast further doubt over his future and blocked his clearance in a meeting on 14 May. A week later however they reversed the decision and ratified his clearance, which paved finally the way for him to join North Melbourne.

Smith did not play a senior game in 1970, but made 17 appearances for North Melbourne in the 1971 VFL season and kicked 16 goals.

A broken ankle kept him out of the side of most of the 1972 season.

Over the next three seasons, North Melbourne's strong Doug Wade led forward-line meant Smith only made occasional appearances and he played a total of 12 games in that period.

A member of North Melbourne's 1975 Championship of Australia winning side, Smith got an opportunity to have extended run in the team in the 1976 VFL season. In the course of four successive rounds in 1976 he twice managed four-goals and scored a career best six-goals in a win over Melbourne at Waverley Park. By the time the September came he was again on the outer and did not feature in the finals series. He finished the season with 21 goals from 12 games.

In the 1977 season he was not called up until North Melbourne's round 18 fixture against Geelong. He was only on the field briefly as he suffered a hamstring strain which forced him out of the game in the first quarter. When North Melbourne coach Ron Barassi surprisingly dropped full-forward Arnold Briedis for the qualifying final against Hawthorn, Smith was named in his place, despite the fact he had only played several minutes of VFL football in 1977. He did not have an impact and was replaced by Gary Cowton at half-time. It was his final game for North Melbourne.

=== Coburg ===
In 1978 he continued his career in the Victorian Football Association with Coburg.

He was a full-forward in Coburg's 1979 premiership team and contributed three goals in the eight-point grand final win over Geelong West.

The following season he kicked 101 goals to finish second in the VFA Division One goal-kicking. His 100th goal came in the grand final loss to Port Melbourne. He was the fifth Coburg player in history to reach the milestone, after Lance Collins, Bob Pratt, Jack Titus and Peter Smith.
