= Paul A. D. de Maine =

American computer scientist (1924–1999)

- Born: October 11, 1924; South Africa
- Died: May 13, 1999 (aged 74); United States
- Education: University of the Witwatersrand (BS); University of British Columbia (PhD)
- Scientific career
- Fields: Chemistry; Computational chemistry; Computer science
- Workplaces: Auburn University; University of Mississippi

Paul Alexander Desmond de Maine (October 11, 1924 – May 13, 1999) was a leading figure in the early development of computer-based automatic indexing and information retrieval and one of the founders of academic computer science in the 1960s.

== Early life and education ==
He was born in South Africa and took his B.Sc. in chemistry and mathematics from the University of Witwatersrand in 1948. De Maine emigrated to England in 1949. He later moved to Canada where he completed his Ph.D. in physical chemistry at the University of British Columbia. He finally moved to the United States in 1957 and served as professor at the University of Mississippi from 1960 to 1963. In 1982 he settled in Auburn.

== Career ==
During his career he worked in the United States for the National Bureau of Standards, the Ballistic Missile Defense Advanced Technology Center, and on the campuses of University of Mississippi and Auburn University. He also served on the publication committee of the magazine Computer while at Pennsylvania State University.

== Publications ==
He was the author of 1 patent, two books, and more than 200 published scientific research articles and reports in chemistry, computational chemistry and computer science. His fields of research included spectroscopy, charge transfer complexes, solution theory, data compression, information retrieval, human-machine interfaces, expert systems and systems for detecting and correcting computational errors.

=== Selected works ===
- Rotwitt, Theodore; deMaine, P. A. D. (1971). "Storage optimization of tree structured files representing descriptor sets". Proceedings of the 1971 ACM SIGFIDET (Now SIGMOD) Workshop on Data Description, Access and Control - SIGFIDET '71. New York, New York, USA: ACM Press. p. 207. doi:10.1145/1734714.1734730.
- DeMaine, P.A.D. (1978). "Automatic curve-fitting—I. Test methods". Computers & Chemistry. 2 (1). Elsevier BV: 1–6. doi:10.1016/0097-8485(78)80001-1. ISSN 0097-8485.
- deMaine, P.A.D.; Springer, G.K.; Mikelskas, R.A. (1978). "Automatic curve-fitting-II. Linear equations". Computers & Chemistry. 2 (1). Elsevier BV: 7–13. doi:10.1016/0097-8485(78)80002-3. ISSN 0097-8485.
- Whitten, Douglas E.; Demaine, Paul A. D. (1975). "A machine and configuration independent Fortran: Portable Fortran {PFortran}". IEEE Transactions on Software Engineering. SE-1 (1). Institute of Electrical and Electronics Engineers (IEEE): 111–124. doi:10.1109/tse.1975.6312825. ISSN 0098-5589. S2CID 16485156.
- deMaine, P.A.D. (1978). "Empirical relationships for random self-avoiding walks on lattices". Computers & Chemistry. 2 (2). Elsevier BV: 53–64. doi:10.1016/0097-8485(78)87002-8. ISSN 0097-8485.
