= Queanbeyan Football Club =

Queanbeyan

Names
- Full name: Queanbeyan Tigers Australian Football Club
- Nickname: Tigers

2025 AFL Canberra season
- After finals: 2nd (Runners Up)
- Home-and-away season: 4th

Club details
- Founded: 1925; 101 years ago
- Colours
- Competition: AFL Canberra
- President: Ron ‘Chook’ Fowlie
- Premierships: AFL Canberra (15); 1939, 1940, 1941, 1985, 1988, 1989, 1991, 1998, 1999, 2000, 2012, 2015, 2020, 2022, 2024
- Ground: Aulich Park

Uniforms
Home

Other information
- Official website: tigersclub.com.au

The Queanbeyan Tigers Australian Football Club, nicknamed the Tigers, is an Australian rules football club that competes in the AFL Canberra. The club is based in Queanbeyan, one of the oldest (proclaimed a town in 1838) and fastest growing municipalities (proclaimed a city in 1972) in New South Wales, that draws players, supporters and administrators from a region of 100,000 people covering the Division of Eden-Monaro.

== History ==
=== Affiliation ===
The team was affiliated with Federal Territory Football League in 1925–26. It was affiliated with the Canberra Australian National Football League in 1927–74, the ACT Australian Football League in 1975–99, AFL Canberra 2000–10 and the North East Australian Football League 2011–2014. The club adopted black and gold colours in 1935 after VFL club Richmond donated a set of playing jumpers.

Alan Muir wrote about the team: "The fact that the club survived all of those tough periods was due to the dedication and vision of men like our Foundation President Wal Mason followed by other outstanding Administrative personalities in Jim Prendergast, Maurie Richards, Dick Sydes, Tom Borrowman, Reg Watson, Jack McNamara and Dave Imrie through to more recent administrators covering both football and the licensed club in Ron Fowlie, Gary Bullivant, Van Rakowski, Geoff Gosling and Mark Thompson”.

The Junior Tigers commenced their 66th Year in the ACT Junior Football League in 2013 and provide over 80 per cent of the senior grade teams (10 former local juniors played in the 2012 NEAFL EC Premiership Team when it defeated the Sydney Swans by 30 points in 2012).

In September 1961, the club moved into new clubrooms on Crawford Street in Queanbeyan.

Since 1979, the team has been located at Margaret Donoghoe Sportsground and supporters have raised $800,000 (in addition to grants from the Tigers Licensed Club) to install facilities such as a roofed grandstand, Interchange and Coaches Boxes for home and visiting teams, an Administration Building, ground lighting, a Hall of Fame walk, canteen, goal netting, scoreboards and disabled access.

=== NEAFL history ===
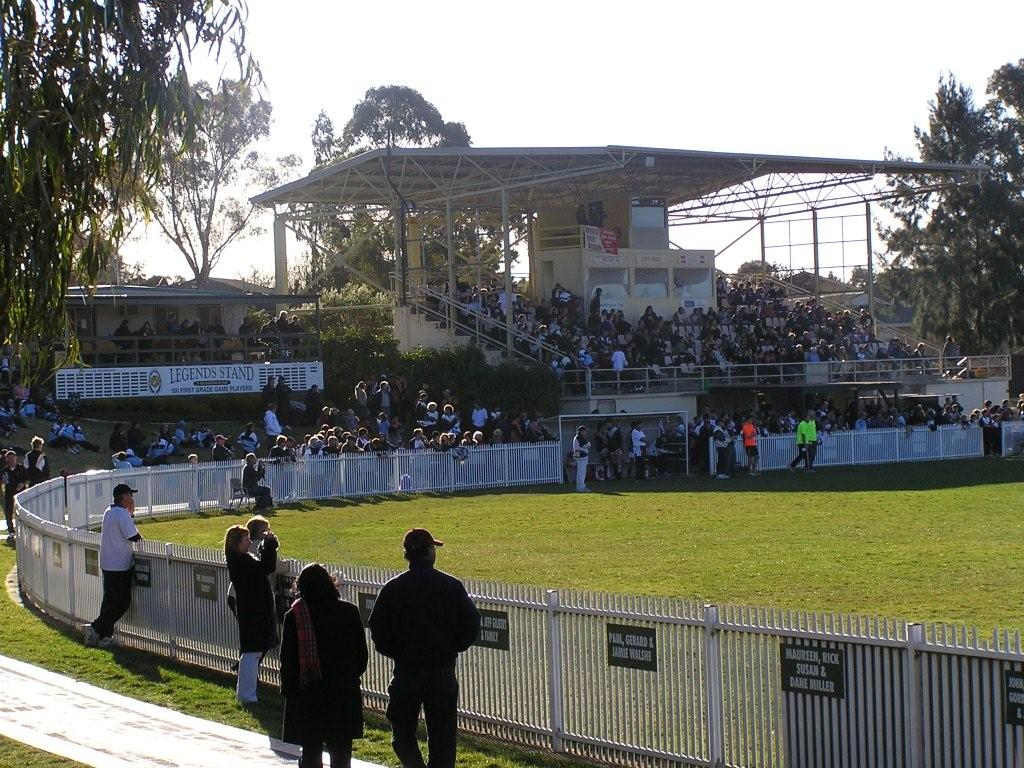
Dairy Farmers Park. Home Ground of the Queanbeyan Tigers.

The club entered the NEAFL for the competition's inaugural season in 2011. In 2012 it won the Eastern Conference premiership with an 18.13 (121) over Sydney Swans 13.13 (91).

=== Alignment with Sapphire Coast Australian Football League ===
Queanbeyan Tigers have appointed Peter Williamson –a former Captain Coach of the Tigers Club who has moved to the South Coast to coordinate a pathway for developing players from all Sapphire Coast Australian Football League Clubs (a region stretching from Bermagui in the North to the Victorian border in the South). For many years the Queanbeyan Tigers sponsored the South East Region Academy of Sport which involved players from clubs in areas such as Bateman's Bay, Bega, Eden and Merimbula, throughout the Bega Valley Shire.

=== Alignment with Cooma Australian Football ===
Queanbeyan Tigers have a formalised development relationship with the Cooma Cats Australian Football Club.

== Premierships ==
| No. | Year | Competition | Opponent | Score | Venue |
|---|---|---|---|---|---|
| 1 | 1939 | Canberra Australian National Football League | | | |
| 2 | 1940 | Canberra Australian National Football League | Eastlake | 14.25 (109) - 4.5 (29) | |
| 3 | 1941 | Canberra Australian National Football League | Fairburn | 13.13 (91) - 13.10 (88) | |
| 4 | 1953 | Canberra Australian National Football League | Ainslie | 9.12 (66) - 8.12 (61) | |
| 5 | 1954 | Canberra Australian National Football League | | - | |
| 6 | 1956 | Canberra Australian National Football League | | - | |
| 7 | 1985 | Australian Capital Territory Football League | | - | |
| 8 | 1988 | Australian Capital Territory Football League | | - | |
| 9 | 1989 | Australian Capital Territory Football League | | - | |
| 10 | 1991 | Australian Capital Territory Football League | | - | |
| 11 | 1998 | Australian Capital Territory Football League | | - | |
| 12 | 1999 | Australian Capital Territory Football League | | - | |
| 13 | 2000 | AFL Canberra | | - | |
| 14 | 2012 | NEAFL Eastern Conference | Sydney Swans | 18.13 (121) - 13.13 (91) | |

== Individual honours ==
=== Mulrooney Medallists ===
- Tom Kelly 1938
- Merv Strang 1938
- Keith Schow 1950
- Roy Watterston 1953 and 1954
- Tony Wynd 1983, 1988, 1989 and 1990
- Steve Cornish 1990
- Michael Kennedy 1994
- Steve Vizy 1997
- Mitch Daniher 2009
- Kel Evans 2018.

=== League top goalkickers ===
- G. Lovell (93) 1940
- R. Savage (54) 1946
- L. White (100) 1956
- M. Wheeler (58) 1958
- J. Lysewycz (67) 1977
- I. Male (63) 1987
- D. Skuta (61) 1989
- S. Cornish (105) 1990
- A. Mapleson (126) 1992
- M. Niesen (45) 1997 (97) 1998
- L. Ellis (70) 2002, (89) 2003
- M. Armstrong (103) 2007, (57) 2008 (57) 2010.

=== Highest score ===
- 43.37 (295) vs. RAAF on 27 July 1940.

=== Record finals attendance ===
- 10,000 (approx.) for 1985 Grand Final: Queanbeyan 23.18 (156); Ainslie 14.13 (97).

== AFL/VFL players ==
There is a list of players who have played at AFL/VFL:

- Robert Anderson (Footscray)
- Wayne Carroll (South Melbourne)
- Kevin Delmenico (Footscray)
- Michael Kennedy (Brisbane)
- Jack Lucas (Sydney)
- Keith Schow (Collingwood)
- Lindsay White (Geelong and South Melbourne)
- Roy Williams (Collingwood)
- Tom Kelly (Carlton)
