= Jack Furniss =

Australian rules footballer, born 1914

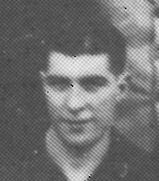

Personal information
- Full name: John Kitchener Furniss
- Born: 11 December 1914; Boolarra, Victoria
- Died: 15 February 2003 (aged 88)
- Original team: Glen Iris
- Height: 183 cm (6 ft 0 in)
- Weight: 87 kg (192 lb)

Playing career^{1}
Years	Club	Games (Goals)
1936–1940, 1947	Melbourne	57 (2)
- ^{1} Playing statistics correct to the end of 1947.

John Kitchener Furniss (11 December 1914 – 15 February 2003) was an Australian rules footballer who played with Melbourne in the Victorian Football League (VFL).

Furniss was born in Boolarra and played his early football at Glen Iris. He was a follower in Melbourne's 1939 premiership side. The following year he appeared in Melbourne's preliminary final win but injury cost him a spot in their premiership team.

He served with the Royal Australian Air Force during World War II. Although his RAAF commitments kept him out of the VFL, he did however play in Canberra, for the Fairbairn club. He won his league's best and fairest award, the Mulrooney Medal, in 1941.

In 1947 he returned to the VFL after a seven-year absence and played two senior games for Melbourne.
