= Brian Furniss =

English cricketer (1934–2013)

John Brian Furniss, known as Brian Furniss (16 November 1934 – 19 September 2013) was an English cricketer who played first-class cricket for Derbyshire in 1955 and 1956.

Furniss was born in Baslow, Derbyshire. He joined Derbyshire in 1955 and played mainly in the Second XI, but made his first-class debut in a victory against Scotland in August 1955. He played three first-class matches in 1956 – two games in the County Championship at the beginning of the 1956 season and one more game against Oxford University. He continued playing in the Minor Counties Championship for the Derbyshire Second XI until 1958.

Furniss was a right-arm medium-fast bowler and took seven first-class wickets at an average of 37.00 and a best performance of 3 for 52. He was a right-handed batsman and played five innings at the tail end in four first-class matches with an average of 2.25 and a top score of 6.

He died at Retford, Nottinghamshire on 19 September 2013.
