= Mike Demaine =

Australian rules footballer

Personal information
- Full name: Michael Demaine
- Born: 1 March 1948
- Died: 15 September 2013 (aged 65)
- Original team: Mornington
- Height: 183 cm (6 ft 0 in)
- Weight: 80 kg (176 lb)

Playing career^{1}
Years	Club	Games (Goals)
1965–1966	Hawthorn	11 (0)
- ^{1} Playing statistics correct to the end of 1966.

Michael Demaine (1 March 1948 – 15 September 2013) was an Australian rules footballer who played with Hawthorn in the Victorian Football League (VFL).

Demaine, who came from Mornington, was a wingman and half forward flanker. He made ten appearances for Hawthorn in the 1965 VFL season.

In the opening round of the 1966 season, against Collingwood, Demaine was seriously injured and had to have a ruptured kidney removed. He never appeared for Hawthorn again but played some good football for Mt Eliza.
