= John Furniss (priest) =

John Furniss (19 June 1809, near Sheffield, England – 16 September 1865, at Clapham, London) was an English Roman Catholic priest, known for his mission to children.

== Life ==
His father was a wealthy master-cutler. He was educated at Sedgley Park School, St Mary's College, Oscott, and Ushaw College, where he became a priest in 1834. He was resident priest at Doncaster for five years, but his health having given way he travelled during eight years through Europe and the East.

After his return home, 1847, he spent some time at Islington, London, working for the welfare of street children. He became a professed member of the Congregation of the Most Holy Redeemer at St. Trond, Belgium, 1851, and afterwards gave missions in England and Ireland; but from 1851 until his death he devoted himself wholly to giving missions to children.

He was the founder of children's missions and "the children's Mass", and by his writings systematized a philosophy of religious training. These missions lasted sometimes three weeks, and were given not only to school-children, but to working boys and girls. His maxim was that "nothing so disgusted children as monotony", and therefore he had the prayers at Mass and the Rosary sung to simple airs, and his sermons seldom lasted more than twenty minutes. Preaching quietly but with great dramatic power from a platform, he held their attention. He was a story-teller, seldom moving to laughter but often to tears.

== Works ==
Furniss spent his spare time writing books for children in simple language; more than four millions of his booklets were sold. His chief works are The Sunday-School Teacher and God and His creatures, which has been published in French. Unusually, Furniss tackled the afterlife and the end of the world in his works for children, using classical, pre-modern stories to back it. In the pamphlet "The Sight of Hell" (1861), for example, he uses visceral imagery to describe hell-for-children: an eighteen-year-old girl who cared only about fashion and dancing is burnt to cinders by a dress made of fire; a sixteen-year-old girl who disobeyed her parents is forced to live in a cell with a burning hot floor scorching her feet; a young boy who went to pubs, dancing-houses, and theatres has his blood literally boiling and roasting him from the inside out, but acknowledges that his punishment is just; and a little child is trapped inside a scorching hot oven forever, their face frozen with despair. Furniss wrote "the same law which is for others is also for children. If children knowingly and willingly break God's commandments, they also must be punished like the others."

The Saturday Review attacked Furniss for his works, to which he wrote a scathing reply. His writings were assailed as "infamous publications" by the rationalist historian William Edward Hartpole Lecky in his History of European Morals, chiefly on account of the lurid eschatology of the children's books. Lecky and others considered Furniss's work traumatizing. Furniss warned the 'little child' reading "The Sight of Hell", for example, that 'if you go to Hell, there will be a devil at your side to strike you. He will go on striking you every minute for ever and ever'.
