= Acton Football Club =

The Acton Football Club is a defunct Australian Rules Football club that played in the ACT AFL from 1924 to 1973. The club wore black and white colours, similar to the Swan Districts Football Club. Acton merged with Queanbeyan in 1952 but separated in 1958. In 1974, Acton was replaced in the ACTAFL by West Canberra, which not only adopted Acton's black and white colours, but also recruited the vast majority of its players.

== Premierships ==
Acton won two ACT AFL premierships as a stand-alone club in 1924 and 1927, and three as a combined Queanbeyan-Acton team in 1953, 1954 and 1956.
