= Ainslie Football Club =

Ainslie

Names
- Full name: Ainslie Football Club
- Nickname: Tricolours
- Club song: Cheers to the Red, White and Black We'll never falter, we'll never slack When those Ainslie teams go marching Onwards to victory Are we good, are we good Are we very, very good We are a team of champions It takes a good team to beat us A better team to whop us And Ainslie knows it's true Are we good, are we good Are we very, very good We are a team of champions!

2026 AFL Canberra season
- After finals: 1st (Premiers)
- Home-and-away season: 1st

Club details
- Founded: 1927; 99 years ago
- Colours
- Competition: AFL Canberra
- President: Michael Cawley
- Coach: Men's – Jason Tutt; Women's – Stafford Cooper
- Captain(s): Men's – Matt Teasdale; Women's – Shannon Brown; Jamie Clayden
- Premierships: AFL Canberra (29); 1929, 1936, 1946, 1947, 1952, 1958, 1959, 1961, 1970, 1979, 1980, 1982, 1983, 1984, 1987, 1990, 1992, 1993, 1994, 1995, 1996, 1997, 2010, 2011, 2016, 2017, 2018, 2019, 2026
- Ground: Alan Ray Oval

Uniforms
Home

Other information
- Official website: ainsliefootball.com.au

The Ainslie Football Club is a semi-professional Australian rules football club based in Canberra, in the Australian Capital Territory.

The club was formed in 1927 and won its first premiership in 1929.

Ex-St Kilda star Kevin Neale was captain-coach for six seasons (1978–1983), during which time Ainslie won four premierships: 1979, 1980, 1982, 1983.

In 1984 Ex-Collingwood and Richmond player Rod Oborne captain-coached the club, winning the 1984 premiership. The club was also coached by former VFL/AFL great David Cloke. Chris Rourke coached Ainslie for 14 years from 2007 to 2020 taking the club to six premierships during that period.

The club entered the NEAFL for the competition's inaugural season in 2011 – finishing the year as Eastern Conference premiers. The club left NEAFL at the end of the 2015 season and returned to the AFL Canberra competition.

The Club's male record games holder is Todd Pulford (236 games) and the female record holder is Dani Curcio (236 games).

== Club Patrons ==
The Ainslie Football Club has had 10 Club Patrons.

Club Patrons
Year/s	Patron/s
1927–1939	No Patron Appointed
1940–1941	Robert Menzies
1942–1945	No Paton Appointed
1946–1956	J C Moore
1957–1976	R H Lewis, BEM R W Chew
1977–1982	R H Lewis, BEM H Gaylard, BEM
1983–1986	H Gaylard, BEM Senator Don Jessop Senator Michael Townley
1987	S L Ray, OAM Senator Don Jessop Senator Michael Townley
1988–1995	S L Ray, OAM
1996 – Feb 2014	A L Ray
2015–	B Marshall

== Club Presidents ==
There have been 24 Presidents of the Ainslie Football Club.

Club Presidents
Year/s	Name
1927	P T H McNamara
1928–1930	Frank Green
1931–1933	T James
1934–1935	C Gregory
1936	G Bourne
1937	J Horgan
1938	T Gillard
1939–1953	R H Lewis, BEM
1954–1955	B Whatman, MBE
1956	J Whatman
1957–1971	H Gaylard, BEM
1972–1975	A Ray
1976–1981	K Heales
1982–1985	B Glossop
1986–1987	K Heales
1988–1990	D Lalor
1991—1993	D Seymour
1994–1996	B Glossop
1997–2000	G Cox
2001–2002	J Miller
2003–2005	K Heales
2006–2016	I Muir
2017–2023	L Phillips
2024–	M Cawley

== Ainslie Women's First Grade Coaches ==
Ainslie Football Club Women's First Grade Coaches and Premiership years.

Women's First Grade Coaches
Year/s	Name	Premierships
1998–1999	J Dehuis	
2000–2007	S Gnaden	2001
2008	J Fromm	
2009	T Treloar	
2010	M Porter	
2011	K Treloar	
2012	D Glatz	
2013–2014	B James	
2015	M Jamieson	
2016–2018	F Van de Made	
2019-2024	B Tully	2023
2025-	S Cooper	2025, 2026

== Ainslie Men's First Grade Coaches ==
Ainslie Football Club Men's First Grade Coaches and Premiership years.

Year/s	Name/s	Premierships
1927	H Kirpatrick	
1928	W Griffith Snr G Welsh	
1929	G Hanley M Richards	1929
1930	C Williams	
1931	L Alexander	
1932	H Gaylard, BEM	
1933–1935	J Keogh	
1936	L James Snr	1936
1937	L James Snr J Keogh	
1938	L James Snr	
1939	E Gyngell	
1940–1941	T Evans	
1942–1945	No Coach – WW II	
1946	L James Snr	1946
1947–1948	R Furler	1947
1949	B Kay	
1950	R Bloomfield	
1951	L James SNR	
1952–1953	A K Stevens	1952
1954	B Whatman	
1955	T Evans	
1956	B Whatman	
1957–1960	R Donnellan	1958, 1959
1961–1965	N Neeson	1961
1966–1968	W Drake	
1969	L Cronin	
1970–1972	J Davies	1970
1973–1975	J Jillard	
1976	K Hassett	
1977	B Read	
1978–1983	K Neale	1979, 1980, 1982, 1983
1984–1985	R Oborne	1984
1986	B Cook	
1987–1988	R Durnan	1987
1989	R Durnan B Hannam	
1990–1991	B Hannam	1990
1992–1993	D Cloke	1992, 1993
1994–1996	P Banfield	1994, 1995, 1996
1997	R Smith	1997
1998	K Neale	
1999	B Heaver	
2000	P Gribble	
2001–2005	B Knowles	
2006	A Bishop	
2007–2020	C Rourke	2010, 2011, 2016, 2017, 2018, 2019
2021–2022	J Doering	
2023–	J Tutt	2026

== AFL/VFL players ==
There are list of past and present Ainsile players who have played at AFL/VFL:

- Alan Bloomfield (North Melbourne)
- Neil Bristow (Footscray)
- Nathan Buckley (Brisbane Bears and Collingwood)
- David Cloke (Richmond and Collingwood)
- Brian Cook (Melbourne)
- John Davies (Geelong)
- Aldo Dipetta (St. Kilda and Sydney Swans)
- Ray Donnellan (Fitzroy)
- Bob Furler (1918–1998) (Hawthorn)
- Nick Heyne (St. Kilda)
- James Hird (Essendon)
- John Jillard (1941–1998) (Footscray)
- Ken McGregor (Adelaide)
- Kevin Neale (St. Kilda)
- Nick Salter (Port Adelaide)
- Marcus Seecamp (Fitzroy and Melbourne)
- Robert Shirley (Adelaide)
- Rob Smith (1951–2013) (North Melbourne)
- Ross W. Smith (North Melbourne)
- Shaun Smith (North Melbourne and Melbourne)
- Alan Stevens (St. Kilda)
- Jason Tutt (Western Bulldogs and Carlton)
- Aaron vandenBerg (Melbourne)
- Riley Hamilton (Greater Western Sydney)

== AFLW players ==
There are list of past and present Ainslie players who have played at AFLW:

- Britt Tully (Greater Western Sydney - drafted October 2016)
- Ashleigh Brazil (Collingwood - drafted October 2017)
- Tess Cattle (Greater Western Sydney – drafted June 2022)
- Georgia Clayden (Gold Coast Suns – selected June 2022)
- Georgie Jacques (Port Adelaide - selected April 2023)
- Lily Quigley (Gold Coast Suns - drafted May 2026)
