= Manuka Football Club =

Manuka

Names
- Full name: Manuka Football Club
- Nickname: Bullants

Club details
- Founded: 1928
- Dissolved: 1991; 35 years ago (merged with Eastlake)
- Colours
- Competition: AFL Canberra (1928–1991)

Uniforms
Home

Manuka Football Club is a defunct Australian rules football club that played in the AFL Canberra from 1928–1991. Also known as the Bullants, the club played at Manuka Oval in the inner-south suburbs of Canberra. It merged with Eastlake Football Club in 1991.

== Notable players ==
- Adrian Barich (Played for Manuka from 1981-1983 including 1981 premiership, later played for Perth and the West Coast Eagles from 1987–1992)
- Ed Blackaby (Played for Manuka for 10 seasons, amassing 185 games, 4 years as captain coach including premierships in 1971, 1973, 1974, 1975 and 1977. Later played and coached Swan Districts, AFL Canberra Hall of Fame inductee, 2006)
- Keith Bromage (Captain-Coach 1962-1965, previously played for Collingwood and Fitzroy)
- Michael Conlan (Played for Fitzroy 1977-1989)
- Ray Donnellan (Captain-Coach 1953-1956, ex-Fitzroy)
- Robert Franklin (AFL Canberra Hall of Fame inductee, 2006)
- Peter Kenny (Played for Carlton in 1986)
- Ian Low (Played for Footscray and Collingwood from 1975 to 1980)
- Jack Dorman (AFL Canberra Hall of Fame inductee, 2006)
- Brian Quade (Captain-Coach 1980-1982, premiership 1981)
- Robert Whatman (Played for Geelong 1972-1974)

== Honours ==
Although Manuka merged with Eastlake in 1991, the team enjoyed premiership success 16 times before becoming Southern Districts in 1991.

- AFL Canberra (16):
  - 1931, 1935, 1938, 1942, 1949, 1950, 1955, 1967, 1968, 1969, 1971, 1973, 1974, 1975, 1977, 1981

== See also ==
- Eastlake Football Club
- AFL Canberra
- Manuka Oval
