= 2024 AFL Canberra season =

101st season of the AFL Canberra First Grade

- Date: 6 April − 14 September 2024

The 2024 AFL Canberra season was the 101st season of the AFL Canberra First Grade, the highest-level men's Australian rules football competition in the Australian Capital Territory (ACT), and the 26th season of the highest-level women's competition. The season began on 6 April and concluded on 14 September.

AFL Canberra, which was established as the Federal Territory Australian Rules Football League (FTARFL) in 1924, celebrated its centenary in 2024. A special "Heritage Round" was held from 12 to 13 July, with all First Grade Men and First Grade Women's matches being played at Manuka Oval.

== Notable events ==
- Queanbeyan celebrated 100 years since the club was formed in 1925.
- Former Ainslie player Rowan Andrews, who played 80 senior games for the club including back-to-back premierships in 2010 and 2011 (NEAFL), died in January 2024.

== First Grade Men ==
2024 AFL Canberra First Grade Men season
- Date: 6 April − 14 September 2024
- Teams: 6
- Premiers: Queanbeyan; 15th premiership (Note: Including the 2012 Eastern Conference premiership in the North East Australian Football League (NEAFL).)
- Minor premiers: Queanbeyan
- Mulrooney Medallist: Angus Baker (Eastlake)
- Leading goalkicker: Andrew Swan (Queanbeyan − 53 goals)

Queanbeyan won the First Grade Men premiership for the 15th time, defeating Eastlake by 15 points in the grand final.

=== Ladder ===
Pos	Team	Pld	W	L	D	PF	PA	PP	Pts	Qualification
1	Queanbeyan (P)	15	12	3	0	1728	710	243.4	48	Finals series
2	Ainslie	15	12	3	0	1512	774	195.4	48	Finals series
3	Eastlake	15	9	6	0	1607	820	196.0	36	Finals series
4	Belconnen	15	9	6	0	1408	867	162.4	36	Finals series
5	Tuggeranong Valley	15	3	12	0	576	1830	31.5	12	
6	Gungahlin	15	0	15	0	432	2262	19.1	0	

Rules for classification: 1) points; 2) percentage; 3) number of points for.
(P) Premiers

=== Finals ===
2024 AFL Canberra First Grade Men Grand Final
Saturday, 14 September (3:55pm)	Queanbeyan	def.	Eastlake	Phillip Oval
2.0 (12); 3.3 (21); 8.5 (53); 11.8 (74)	Q1; Q2; Q3; Final	3.0 (18); 7.0 (42); 8.3 (51); 9.5 (59)
W. Kellar 4, A. Swan 2, J. Bryce, A. Page, R. Pollock, L. Smith, W. Taylor	Goals	J. Bruce 2, A. Harsdorf 2, A. Bruce, W. Clark, L. Hurse, W. McTaggart, C. O'Rourke
W. Kellar, A. Bowyer, L. Highfield, A. Page, A. Lo Pilato, J. Nunn	Best	J. Gunning, A. Harsdorf, W. Brearley, J. Bruce, D. O'Connell, W. McTaggart

== First Grade Women ==
2024 AFL Canberra First Grade Women season
- Date: 6 April − 14 September 2024
- Teams: 6
- Premiers: Queanbeyan; 4th premiership
- Minor premiers: Queanbeyan
- Leading goalkicker: Hannah Wallett (Belconnen − 33 goals)

Queanbeyan won the First Grade Women premiership for the fourth time, defeating Belconnen by 33 points in the grand final.

=== Ladder ===
Pos	Team	Pld	W	L	D	PF	PA	PP	Pts	Qualification
1	Queanbeyan (P)	15	15	0	0	919	124	741.1	60	Finals series
2	Belconnen	15	11	4	0	1033	347	297.7	44	Finals series
3	Ainslie	15	10	5	0	839	311	269.8	40	Finals series
4	Eastlake	15	6	9	0	488	530	92.1	24	Finals series
5	Tuggeranong Valley	15	3	12	0	373	737	50.6	12	
6	Gungahlin	15	0	15	0	21	1624	1.3	0	

Rules for classification: 1) points; 2) percentage; 3) number of points for.
(P) Premiers

=== Finals ===
2024 AFL Canberra First Grade Women Grand Final
Saturday, 14 September (11:15am)	Queanbeyan	def.	Belconnen	Phillip Oval
1.0 (6); 2.3 (15); 5.6 (36); 7.7 (49)	Q1; Q2; Q3; Final	0.3 (3); 1.3 (9); 2.3 (15); 2.4 (16)
E. Dunn 3, C. Cook 2, M. Jones, J. Stramandinoli	Goals	E. Randall, I. Wiencke
E. Dunn, J. Hamilton, P. Highfield, M. McLachlan, J. Stramandinoli, A. Manning	Best	T. O'Donnell, M. Dwyer, J. Simpson, Z. Allen, E. Randall, A. Allen

== Second Grade Men ==
2024 AFL Canberra Second Grade Men season
- Date: 20 April − 14 September 2024
- Teams: 6
- Premiers: Eastlake; 8th premiership
- Minor premiers: Eastlake
- Leading goalkicker: Cameron Terry (Ainslie − 36 goals)

=== Ladder ===
Pos	Team	Pld	W	L	D	PF	PA	PP	Pts	Qualification
1	Eastlake (P)	15	13	2	0	1529	297	514.8	52	Finals series
2	Ainslie	15	13	2	0	1479	397	372.5	52	Finals series
3	Queanbeyan	15	9	6	0	1109	677	163.8	36	Finals series
4	Belconnen	15	7	8	0	896	799	112.1	28	Finals series
5	Tuggeranong Valley	15	3	12	0	367	1539	23.9	12	
6	Gungahlin	15	0	15	0	120	1791	6.7	0	

Rules for classification: 1) points; 2) percentage; 3) number of points for.
(P) Premiers

=== Finals ===
2024 AFL Canberra Second Grade Men Grand Final
Saturday, 14 September (1:35pm)	Ainslie	def. by	Eastlake	Phillip Oval
0.0 (0); 0.1 (1); 0.1 (1); 1.3 (9)	Q1; Q2; Q3; Final	3.1 (31); 7.1 (43); 7.6 (48); 9.8 (62)

== Second Grade Women ==
2024 AFL Canberra Second Grade Women season
- Date: 20 April − 14 September 2024
- Teams: 5
- Premiers: Queanbeyan
- Minor premiers: Queanbeyan
- Leading goalkicker: Jillian Shea (Queanbeyan − 24 goals)

=== Ladder ===
Pos	Team	Pld	W	L	D	PF	PA	PP	Pts	Qualification
1	Queanbeyan (P)	12	12	0	0	589	73	806.9	48	Finals series
2	Ainslie	12	6	5	1	251	271	92.6	26	Finals series
3	Belconnen	12	5	6	1	306	304	100.7	22	Finals series
4	Tuggeranong Valley	12	5	7	0	217	254	85.4	20	Finals series
5	Eastlake	12	1	11	0	127	588	21.6	4	

Rules for classification: 1) points; 2) percentage; 3) number of points for.
(P) Premiers

=== Finals ===
2024 AFL Canberra Second Grade Women Grand Final
Saturday, 14 September (9:00am)	Queanbeyan	def.	Ainslie	Phillip Oval
3.3 (21); 4.6 (30); 7.9 (51); 8.9 (57)	Q1; Q2; Q3; Final	0.0 (0); 1.0 (6); 1.0 (6); 3.2 (20)

== Community Men's Division 1 ==
2024 Community Men's Division 1 season
- Date: 13 April − 7 September 2024
- Teams: 7
- Premiers: Woden; 3rd premiership
- Minor premiers: Batemans Bay
- Leading goalkicker: Buster Ware (Batemans Bay − 49 goals)

=== Ladder ===
Pos	Team	Pld	W	L	D	PF	PA	PP	Pts	Qualification
1	Batemans Bay	14	12	2	0	1041	505	206.1	48	Finals series
2	Woden (P)	14	11	3	0	909	527	172.5	44	Finals series
3	ADFA	14	10	4	0	952	624	152.6	40	Finals series
4	Googong	14	7	7	0	853	755	113.0	28	Finals series
5	ANU	14	6	8	0	754	786	95.9	24	
6	Ainslie	14	1	12	1	478	1054	45.4	6	
7	Molonglo	14	1	12	1	431	1167	36.9	6	

Rules for classification: 1) points; 2) percentage; 3) number of points for.
(P) Premiers

=== Finals ===
2024 Community Men's Division 1 Grand Final
Saturday, 7 September (1:55pm)	Batemans Bay	def. by	Woden	Phillip Oval
1.2 (8); 2.3 (15); 3.4 (22); 4.4 (28)	Q1; Q2; Q3; Final	1.2 (8); 2.5 (17); 4.7 (19); 6.9 (33)
