= List of Australian rules football clubs in the Australian Capital Territory =

This is a list of clubs that play Australian rules football in Australian Capital Territory at the senior level. Guide to abbreviations:

- FC = Football Club
- AFC = Australian Football Club (mainly used if in Queensland or NSW or outside Australia) / Amateur Football Club (mainly used in the other Australian States)
- ARFC = Australian Rules Football Club

== State Level ==
=== AFL Canberra - First Grade ===
Club	Colours	Nickname	Home Ground	Former League	Est.	Years in AFLC	AFLC Senior Premierships	
Club	Colours	Nickname	Home Ground	Former League	Est.	Years in AFLC	Total	Most recent
Ainslie		Tricolours	Alan Ray Oval, Ainslie	–	1927	1927-	28	2019
Belconnen		Magpies	Adero Law Nest, Holt	–	1987	1987-	5	2023
Eastlake (Southern District 1991-95)		Demons	Kingston Oval, Griffith	–	1991	1991-	2	2025
Gungahlin		Jets	Gunghalin Enclosed Oval, Gunghalin	MAFL	1981	1996-	3	2008
Marist		Blue and Blues	Lindwall Oval, Pearce	–	1973	2000-	U/18s only	
Tuggeranong Valley (Sutherland 1977-82)		Valley	Greenway Oval, Greenway	MAFL	1968	1977-	1	1986

== Metropolitan / Country Level ==
=== AFL Canberra - Community divisions ===
Club	Colours	Nickname	Home Ground	Former League	Est.	Years in AFLC	AFLC Senior Premierships	
Club	Colours	Nickname	Home Ground	Former League	Est.	Years in AFLC	Total	Most recent
ADFA (Defence Academy 1987-97)		Rams	ADFA Oval, Campbell, ACT	MAFL	1986	1986-1988, 1996-	8	2019
ANU		Griffins	South Oval, Acton, ACT	MAFL	1961	1962-1979, 1986-1987, 1996-	7	2022
Woden		Blues	Phillip Oval, Phillip, ACT	–	1996	1996-	7	2025
Molonglo (Murrumbidgee 1994-2013)		Juggernauts	Stirling Oval, Stirling, ACT	MAFL	1994	1995-	1	2005
