= 2023 AFL Canberra season =

100th season of the AFL Canberra First Grade

- Date: 15 April − 9 September 2023

The 2023 AFL Canberra season was the 100th season of the AFL Canberra First Grade, the highest-level men's Australian rules football competition in the Australian Capital Territory (ACT), and the 25th season of the highest-level women's competition. The season began on 15 April and concluded on 9 September.

== Background ==
=== Competition structure ===
In 2022, the AFL Canberra Community competition consisted of two men's grades (known as Third Grade and Fourth Grade). This was changed in 2023, with Division 1, Division 2 and Division 3 established for the men's Community competition, and Community Division 1 established for the women's competition. The existing Second Grade Women competition, which was a community-grade competition, became a senior competition (below First Grade Women).

The Googong Hogs introduced a women's team for the first time in 2023, entering Community Division 1.

== First Grade Men ==
2023 AFL Canberra First Grade Men season
- Date: 15 April − 9 September 2023
- Teams: 6
- Premiers: Belconnen; 5th premiership
- Minor premiers: Ainslie
- Mulrooney Medallist: Guy Richardson (Ainslie − 21 votes); Thomas Simpson (Belconnen − 21 votes)
- Leading goalkicker: Andrew Swan (Queanbeyan − 49 goals)

Belconnen won the First Grade Men premiership for the fifth time, defeating Ainslie by 39 points in the grand final.

=== Ladder ===
Pos	Team	Pld	W	L	D	PF	PA	PP	Pts	Qualification
1	Ainslie	15	13	2	0	1294	618	209.4	52	Finals series
2	Belconnen (P)	15	11	4	0	1490	803	185.6	44	Finals series
3	Queanbeyan	15	10	5	0	1372	753	182.2	40	Finals series
4	Eastlake	15	7	8	0	984	1042	94.4	28	Finals series
5	Gungahlin	15	4	11	0	709	1593	44.5	16	
6	Tuggeranong Valley	15	0	15	0	621	1661	37.4	0	

Rules for classification: 1) points; 2) percentage; 3) number of points for.
(P) Premiers

=== Finals ===
2023 AFL Canberra First Grade Men Grand Final
Saturday, 9 September (2:00pm)	Belconnen	def.	Ainslie	Phillip Oval
4.2 (26); 8.7 (55); 8.9 (57); 10.11 (71)	Q1; Q2; Q3; Final	2.2 (14); 2.2 (14); 3.6 (24); 4.8 (32)
M. Monaghan 4, T. Simpson 2, S. Glyde, S. O'Sullivan, H. Saunders, J. Taylor	Goals	I. Bishop, N. Gray, J. Revet, T. Tyquin
M. Monaghan, T. Simpson, O. Withers, J. Baker, B. Hoffmann, A. Jones	Best

== First Grade Women ==
2023 AFL Canberra First Grade Women season
- Date: 15 April − 9 September 2023
- Teams: 6
- Premiers: Ainslie; 2nd premiership
- Minor premiers: Ainslie
- Leading goalkicker: Hannah Wallett (Belconnen − 37 goals)

=== Ladder ===
Pos	Team	Pld	W	L	D	PF	PA	PP	Pts	Qualification
1	Ainslie (P)	15	13	2	0	943	246	383.3	52	Finals series
2	Belconnen	15	12	3	0	851	333	255.6	48	Finals series
3	Queanbeyan	15	9	6	0	866	303	285.8	36	Finals series
4	Eastlake	15	8	7	0	750	475	157.9	32	Finals series
5	Tuggeranong Valley	15	3	12	0	237	1042	22.7	12	
6	Gungahlin	15	0	15	0	36	1284	2.8	0	

Rules for classification: 1) points; 2) percentage; 3) number of points for.
(P) Premiers

=== Finals ===
2023 AFL Canberra First Grade Women Grand Final
Saturday, 9 September (11:30am)	Belconnen	def. by	Ainslie	Phillip Oval
0.1 (1); 0.2 (2); 0.3 (3); 1.6 (12)	Q1; Q2; Q3; Final	1.3 (9); 5.6 (36); 7.10 (52); 10.11 (71)
L. Anderson	Goals	O. Fogarty 2, Renee Friend 2, Z. Skyrianos 2, E. Bishop, B. Carlin, A. Evans, Rachel Friend
A. Allen, N. McKay, J. Spence, E. Zouch, M. Dwyer, G. Read	Best	E. Hill, O. Fogarty, Z. Skyrianos, E. Herron, A. Evans, E. Bishop
