= Jason Tutt =

Australian rules footballer (born 1991)

- Tutt coaching Ainslie in September 2026

Personal information
- Full name: Jason Tutt
- Born: 15 May 1991 (age 35)
- Original team: Ainslie (AFL Canberra)
- Draft: No. 31, 2009 national draft No. 2, 2015 pre-season draft
- Height: 177 cm (5 ft 10 in)
- Weight: 77 kg (170 lb)
- Position: Forward

Playing career^{1}
Years	Club	Games (Goals)
2010–2014	Western Bulldogs	26 (22)
2015–2016	Carlton	14 (5)
Total		40 (27)
- ^{1} Playing statistics correct to the end of 2016.

Career highlights
- VFL premiership player: 2014; AFL Canberra premiership coach: 2026; Northern Blues second best-and-fairest: 2016; VAFA Premier Coaches MVP Award: 2017

Jason Tutt (born 15 May 1991) is an Australian rules football coach and former player who currently serves as the head coach of the Ainslie Football Club in the AFL Canberra First Grade Men competition. He previously played professionally for the Western Bulldogs and Carlton in the Australian Football League (AFL).

== Career ==
Tutt is from Canberra and played his junior football for the Ainslie Football Club. He made his debut in the AFL Canberra First Grade Men competition for Ainslie against Sydney at the Sydney Cricket Ground and later played in a losing grand final against Belconnen in 2009.

He was selected by the Western Bulldogs with pick 31 in the 2009 AFL draft. He made his AFL debut in round 22 of the 2011 season against Port Adelaide, where he kicked three goals with his first three kicks, finishing the match with four goals from twenty-six disposals and receiving one Brownlow Medal vote.

By late 2014, Tutt was frequently being used as the Western Bulldogs' substitute in the AFL. He also played for the club's reserves team in the Victorian Football League (VFL), where he was a member of the 2014 premiership-winning side against Box Hill.

At the conclusion of the 2014 AFL season, Tutt chose to delist himself from the Bulldogs' list in order to join Carlton, after a deal to formally trade him failed to be reached. He was the only player drafted in the 2015 pre-season draft, where Carlton selected him with pick 2. Tutt made his debut for the club against West Coast in round 2, playing a total of thirteen matches during the 2015 AFL season.

In 2016, Tutt only played one AFL match. He played fourteen VFL matches for Carlton's reserves affiliate, the Northern Blues, where he was named among the best players in eleven matches and finished second in the team's best-and-fairest count. Tutt was delisted by Carlton on 25 October 2016.

Tutt played for De La Salle in the Victorian Amateur Football Association (VAFA) during the 2017 season, winning the Premier Coaches MVP Award. He represented the VAFA during a match against AFL Victoria Country at Frankston Park in July 2017.

In 2021, Tutt moved back to Canberra to return to the Ainslie Football Club as a player and senior coaching assistant. On 28 October 2022, he was announced as Ainslie's head coach in the First Grade Men competition, taking over from Jordan Doering. Tutt retired from playing at the conclusion of the 2023 season and received a two-year contract extension in August 2024. He coached the club to an undefeated season in 2026, culminating in a 39-point victory over Eastlake in the First Grade Men grand final at Phillip Oval.

== Personal life ==
Tutt is the nephew of Alan Tutt, a former Ainslie and South Adelaide player who is a member of the ACT team of the century. His father, Robert, and brother, Ryan, are both Ainslie premiership players.

== Statistics ==
Legend
G	Goals	K	Kicks	D	Disposals	T	Tackles
B	Behinds	H	Handballs	M	Marks

Season	Team	No.	Games	Totals							Averages (per game)						
Season	Team	No.	Games	G	B	K	H	D	M	T	G	B	K	H	D	M	T
2010	Western Bulldogs	34	0	—	—	—	—	—	—	—	—	—	—	—	—	—	—
2011	Western Bulldogs	34	3	5	3	37	23	60	17	7	1.7	1.0	12.3	7.7	20.0	5.7	2.3
2012	Western Bulldogs	15	5	2	1	27	17	44	14	7	0.4	0.2	5.4	3.4	8.8	2.8	1.4
2013	Western Bulldogs	15	11	5	8	86	38	124	25	16	0.5	0.7	7.8	3.5	11.3	2.3	1.5
2014	Western Bulldogs	15	7	10	3	67	33	100	14	32	1.4	0.4	9.6	4.7	14.3	2.0	4.6
2015	Carlton	22	13	4	5	128	90	218	55	35	0.3	0.4	9.8	6.9	16.8	4.2	2.7
2016	Carlton	22	1	1	0	10	8	18	4	4	1.0	0.0	10.0	8.0	18.0	4.0	4.0
Career			40	27	20	355	209	564	129	101	0.7	0.5	8.9	5.2	14.1	3.2	2.5
