= 2020–21 Women's National Cricket League season =

Cricket tournament

Women's National Cricket League 2020–21 season
- Dates: 30 January 2021 – 27 March 2021
- Administrator: Cricket Australia
- Cricket format: Limited overs cricket (50 overs)
- Tournament format(s): Round-robin and final
- Champions: Queensland (1st title)
- Runners-up: Victoria
- Participants: 7
- Matches: 29
- Player of the series: (Victoria (state)) Elyse Villani
- Most runs: (Victoria (state)) Elyse Villani (611)
- Most wickets: (New South Wales) Molly Strano (14)
- Official website: cricket.com.au

The 2020–21 Women's National Cricket League season was the 25th season of the Women's National Cricket League (WNCL), the women's domestic limited overs cricket competition in Australia. The tournament started on 30 January 2021 and finished on 27 March 2021. Defending champions Western Australia finished bottom of the ladder, while 20-time winners New South Wales Breakers missed out on the final for the first time. Victoria finished top of the ladder and met Queensland Fire in the final, where the latter won by 112 runs to secure their first WNCL title.

== Ladder ==
As of 22 March 2021

Pos	Team	Pld	W	L	T	MA	Pts	NRR
1	Victoria	8	6	2	0	0	26.5	0.355
2	Queensland	8	4	3	0	1	21	1.158
3	Tasmania	8	4	3	1	0	19	−0.014
4	South Australia	8	4	4	0	0	18	0.151
5	New South Wales	8	3	3	1	1	18	0.353
6	Australian Capital Territory	8	3	5	0	0	13	−0.648
7	Western Australia	8	2	6	0	0	9.5	−1.001

Updated to match(es) played on 22 March 2021. Source:
Rules for classification: The top two ranked teams will qualify for the final.
- Points system: 4 for a win, 2 each for a tie or a no result, 0 for a loss, 1 each for an abandoned match.
- Bonus point system: 2 for win with a run rate twice that of the opposition, 1 for win with a run rate 1.25 times that of the opposition.

== Fixtures ==
30 January 2021
Scorecard

Queensland; 9/163 (25 overs)	v	Australian Capital Territory; 5/169 (24.1 overs)
Beth Mooney 58 (58); Carly Leeson 4/33 (5 overs)		Katie Mack 54 (51); Georgia Prestwidge 2/33 (5 overs)

Australian Capital Territory won by 5 wickets
Phillip Oval, Canberra
Umpires: Andrew Crozier and Chris Cassin
Player of the match: Carly Leeson (ACT Meteors)

- Australian Capital Territory won the toss and elected to field.
- The match was reduced to 25 overs per side and moved from Chisholm Oval to ECP Solar Park (Phillip Oval) due to rain.

3 February 2021
Scorecard

Tasmania; 9/227 (50 overs)	v	Australian Capital Territory; 207 (49 overs)
Nicola Carey 105 (129); Amy Yates 2/32 (7 overs)		Erin Osborne 54 (65); Nicola Carey 3/39 (10 overs)

Tasmania won by 20 runs
Phillip Oval, Canberra
Umpires: Andrew Crozier and Chris Cassin
Player of the match: Nicola Carey (Tasmania)

- Tasmania won the toss and elected to bat.

5 February 2021
Scorecard

South Australia; 174 (47.3 overs)	v	Tasmania; 6/175 (45.5 overs)
Bridget Patterson 34 (71); Sasha Moloney 3/23 (8 overs)		Naomi Stalenberg 47 (66); Megan Schutt 3/26 (10 overs)

Tasmania won by 4 wickets
Phillip Oval, Canberra
Umpires: Andrew Crozier and Chris Cassin
Player of the match: Naomi Stalenberg (Tasmania)

- South Australia won the toss and elected to bat.

7 February 2021
Scorecard

Australian Capital Territory; 196 (49.1 overs)	v	South Australia; 3/197 (48.4 overs)
Katie Mack 106* (131); Samantha Betts 3/14 (5 overs)		Bridget Patterson 108* (162); Nicola Hancock 1/25 (6 overs)

South Australia won by 7 wickets
Phillip Oval, Canberra
Umpires: Andrew Crozier and Chris Cassin
Player of the match: Bridget Patterson (South Australia)

- Australian Capital Territory won the toss and elected to bat.

10 February 2021
Scorecard

New South Wales; 241 (48.2 overs)	v	Victoria; 2/242 (42.4 overs)
Ashleigh Gardner 61 (60); Sophie Molineux 4/35 (9 overs)		Elyse Villani 135* (135); Lauren Smith 1/3 (1 over)

Victoria won by 8 wickets
Junction Oval, Melbourne
Umpires: Daryl Brigham and Greg Azzopardi
Player of the match: Elyse Villani (Victoria)

- New South Wales won the toss and elected to bat.

12 February 2021
Scorecard

New South Wales; 206 (49 overs)	v	Victoria; 2/207 (44.5 overs)
Alyssa Healy 65 (71); Annabel Sutherland 3/45 (10 overs)		Meg Lanning 91* (101); Lauren Cheatle 1/14 (7 overs)

Victoria won by 8 wickets
Junction Oval, Melbourne
Umpires: Chris Grant and Mattis van Eck
Player of the match: Meg Lanning (Victoria)

- Victoria won the toss and elected to field.

17 February 2021
Scorecard

Western Australia; 8/170 (50 overs)	v	Tasmania; 1/171 (31.3 overs)
Chloe Piparo 50 (95); Belinda Vakarewa 2/22 (10 overs)		Sasha Moloney 77* (101); Alana King 1/20 (5 overs)

Tasmania won by 9 wickets
Kingston Twin Ovals, Hobart
Umpires: Jeremiah Matibiri and Simon Burns
Player of the match: Sasha Moloney (Tasmania)

- Tasmania won the toss and elected to field.

19 February 2021
Scorecard

Tasmania; 9/215 (50 overs)	v	Western Australia; 8/214 (50 overs)
Meg Phillips 49* (70); Nicole Bolton 3/46 (10 overs)		Nicole Bolton 71 (79); Amy Smith 4/27 (7 overs)

Tasmania won by 1 run
Kingston Twin Ovals, Hobart
Umpires: Jeremiah Matibiri and Mohammad Qureshi
Player of the match: Nicole Bolton (Western Australia)

- Western Australia won the toss and elected to field.

20 February 2021
Scorecard

Queensland; 170 (39.3 overs)	v	South Australia; 2/172 (37.3 overs)
Jess Jonassen 39 (52); Amanda-Jade Wellington 3/30 (7 overs)		Courtney Webb 51* (49); Grace Harris 1/35 (6 overs)

South Australia won by 8 wickets
Allan Border Field, Brisbane
Umpires: N James and Stephen Dionysius
Player of the match: Tahlia McGrath (South Australia)

- South Australia won the toss and elected to field.
- The match was reduced to 40 overs per side due to rain.

21 February 2021
Scorecard

Victoria; 7/287 (50 overs)	v	Australian Capital Territory; 132 (42.4 overs)
Meg Lanning 96 (81); Amy Yates 2/57 (10 overs)		Angela Reakes 54 (84); Tayla Vlaeminck 4/16 (8 overs)

Victoria won by 155 runs
Blacktown International Sports Park No.2, Sydney
Umpires: Andrew Hamilton, Sharad Patel
Player of the match: Meg Lanning (Victoria)

- Australian Capital Territory won the toss and elected to field.

23 February 2021
Scorecard

South Australia; 205 (48.5 overs)	v	Victoria; 8/209 (49.4 overs)
Josie Dooley 68*(88); Molly Strano 3/32 (9.5 overs)		Ellyse Perry 67(117); Tahlia McGrath 4/46 (10 overs)

Victoria won by 2 wickets
Blacktown International Sports Park No.2, Sydney
Umpires: Andrew Hamilton, Bede Sajowitz
Player of the match: Molly Strano

- Victoria won the toss and elected to field.

25 February 2021
Scorecard

New South Wales; 6/246 (47 overs)	v	Tasmania; 7/251 (47 overs)
Rachael Haynes 109 (112); Nicola Carey 3/43 (10 overs)		Heather Graham 116 (110); Lauren Cheatle 3/37 (10 overs)

Match tied (D/L method)
Bellerive Oval, Hobart
Umpires: G Beechey, Muhammed Qureshi
Player of the match: Heather Graham

- Tasmania won the toss and elected to field.
- The match was reduced to 47 overs per side because of rain.

27 February 2021
Scorecard

Western Australia; 140 (46.1 overs)	v	Queensland; 1/142 (21 overs)
Mathilda Carmichael 39 (73); Holly Ferling 3/22 (8 overs)		Beth Mooney 73 (58); Emma King 1/19 (4 overs)

Queensland won by 9 wickets
Allan Border Field, Brisbane
Umpires: N James, S Farrell
Player of the match: Beth Mooney

- Western Australia won the toss and elected to bat.

28 February 2021
Scorecard

Tasmania; 9/255 (50 overs)	v	Victoria; 5/256 (48.1 overs)
Sasha Moloney 69 (107); Molly Strano 4/46 (7 overs)		Elyse Villani 133* (124); Samantha Bates 3/42 (10 overs)

Victoria won by 5 wickets
Bellerive Oval, Hobart
Umpires: G Beechey, Simon Burns
Player of the match: Elyse Villani

- Victoria won the toss and elected to field.

28 February 2021
Scorecard

South Australia; 175 (48.2 overs)	v	New South Wales; 4/176 (35.5 overs)
Tahlia McGrath 41 (49); Hayley Silver-Holmes 3/13 (6.2 overs)		Rachel Haynes 69 (90); Darcie Brown 2/42 (8 overs)

New South Wales won by 6 wickets
Karen Rolton Oval, Adelaide
Umpires: Eloise Sherodan, Mary Waldron
Player of the match: Rachel Haynes

- New South Wales won the toss and elected to field.

1 March 2021
Scorecard

Queensland; 4/368 (50 overs)	v	Western Australia; 208 (46.5 overs)
Beth Mooney 163 (139); Sheldyn Cooper 1/64 (8 overs)		Chloe Piparo 53 (66); Courtney Sippel 3/25 (8.5 overs)

Queensland won by 160 runs
Allan Border Field, Brisbane
Umpires: David Taylor, N James
Player of the match: Beth Mooney

- Western Australia won the toss and elected to field.

5 March 2021
Scorecard

Australian Capital Territory; 9/254 (50 overs)	v	New South Wales; 1/255 (38.3 overs)
Katie Mack 71 (96); Hayley Silver-Holmes 4/39 (7 overs)		Rachel Haynes 139* (105); Madeline Penna 1/22 (3 overs)

New South Wales won by 9 wickets
Phillip Oval, Canberra
Umpires: Andrew Crozier, Chris Cassin
Player of the match: Rachel Haynes

- ACT won the toss and elected to bat.

5 March 2021
Scorecard

Queensland; 9/233 (50 overs)	v	Victoria; 4/237 (38.2 overs)
Jess Jonassen 43 (46); Georgia Wareham 4/46 (10 overs)		Elyse Villani 118 (101); Jess Jonassen 3/43 (10 overs)

Victoria won by 6 wickets
Junction Oval, Melbourne
Umpires: Daryl Brigham, Lisa McCabe
Player of the match: Elyse Villani

- Victoria won the toss and elected to field.

7 March 2021
Scorecard

New South Wales; 5/337 (50 overs)	v	Australian Capital Territory; 8/259 (50 overs)
Alyssa Healy 92 (97); Gabby Sutcliffe 3/66 (9 overs)		Carly Leeson 54* (53); Erin Burns 2/39 (7 overs)

New South Wales won by 78 runs
Phillip Oval, Canberra
Umpires: Andrew Crozier, Chris Cassin
Player of the match: Alyssa Healy

- New South Wales won the toss and elected to bat.

7 March 2021
Scorecard

Tasmania; 9/226 (50 overs)	v	Queensland; 2/227 (36.4 overs)
Sarah Coyte 66 (88); Holly Ferling 3/50 (7 overs)		Grace Harris 109* (96); Samantha Bates 1/23 (6 overs)

Queensland won by 8 wickets
Bellerive Oval, Hobart
Umpires: Jeremiah Matibiri, Muhammad Qureshi
Player of the match: Grace Harris

- Queensland won the toss and elected to field.

12 March 2021
Scorecard

Australian Capital Territory; 6/275 (50 overs)	v	Western Australia; 211 (45.2 overs)
Madeline Penna 118*(100); Emma King 3/26(10 overs)		Chloe Piparo 74(110); Erin Osborne 3/32(10 overs)

Australian Capital Territory won by 64 runs
WACA Ground, Perth
Umpires: Jamie Thomas, Nathan Johnstone

- Australian Capital Territory won the toss and elected to bat.

14 March 2021
Scorecard

South Australia; 7/251 (50 overs)	v	Western Australia; 181 (40.4 overs)
Bridget Patterson 103(141); Nicole Bolton 3/33(10 overs)		Amy Edgar 49(59); Brooke Harris 3/41(7.4 overs)

South Australia won by 70 runs
WACA Ground, Perth
Umpires: Jamie Thomas, Nathan Johnstone
Player of the match: Bridget Patterson

- South Australia won the toss and elected to bat.

18 March 2021
Scorecard

Victoria; 155 (48.1 overs)	v	Western Australia; 4/156 (27.1 overs)
Kim Garth 51(87); Taneale Peschel 4/37(10 overs)		Mathilda Carmichael 47*(55); Lucy Cripps 2/25(2 overs)

Western Australia won by 6 wickets
WACA Ground, Perth
Umpires: Jamie Thomas, Dean Trigg
Player of the match: Taneale Peschel

- Victoria won the toss and elected to bat.

19 March 2021
Scorecard

South Australia; 9/266 (50 overs)	v	Tasmania; 205 (44.1 overs)
Josephine Dooley 116(112); Heather Graham 5/44(10 overs)		Emily Smith 41(49); Samantha Betts 3/37(9 overs)

South Australia won by 61 runs
Karen Rolton Oval, Adelaide
Umpires: Eloise Sheridan, Mary Waldron
Player of the match: Josephine Dooley

- Tasmania won the toss and elected to field.

19 March 2021
Scorecard

New South Wales; 7/236 (48 overs)	v	Queensland; 2/241 (42.5 overs)
Rachel Trenaman 69(91); Grace Harris 3/39(9 overs)		Georgia Redmayne 99*(110); Stella Campbell 1/31(7 overs)

Queensland won by 8 wickets
North Sydney Oval, Sydney
Umpires: Andrew Hamilton, Sharad Patel
Player of the match: Georgia Redmayne

- Queensland won the toss and elected to field.
- The match was reduced to 48 overs per side due to rain.

20 March 2021
Scorecard

Victoria; 8/203 (50 overs)	v	Western Australia; 2/205 (39.4 overs)
Elyse Villani 41(65); Emma King 3/37(10 overs)		Nicole Bolton 100*(105); Courtney Neale 1/39(8 overs)

Western Australia won by 8 wickets
WACA Ground, Perth
Umpires: Jamie Thomas, Dean Trigg
Player of the match: Nicole Bolton

- Victoria won the toss and elected to bat.

21 March 2021
Scorecard

New South Wales	v	Queensland

Match abandoned without a ball being bowled
North Sydney Oval, Sydney
Umpires: Andrew Hamilton, Bede Sajowitz

- No toss

21 March 2021
Scorecard

South Australia; 261 (49.4 overs)	v	Australian Capital Territory; 7/264 (49.1 overs)
Tegan McPharlin 62(68); Chloe Rafferty 3/39(8.4 overs)		Katie Mack 95(106); Brooke Harris 3/53(10 overs)

Australian Capital Territory won by 3 wickets
Karen Rolton Oval, Adelaide
Umpires: Eloise Sheridan, Harsimran Singh
Player of the match: Katie Mack

- South Australia won the toss and elected to bat.

== Final ==
27 March 2021
Scorecard

Queensland; 8/317 (50 overs)	v	Victoria; 205 (42.4 overs)
Georgia Redmayne 134* (146); Kim Garth 3/45 (10 overs)		Kim Garth 48 (54); Grace Harris 4/35 (8 overs)

Queensland won by 112 runs
Junction Oval, Melbourne
Umpires: Claire Polosak, David Taylor
Player of the match: Georgia Redmayne

- Victoria won the toss and elected to field.
- Queensland won the 2020–21 Women's National Cricket League.

== Statistics ==
=== Highest totals ===
Team	Score	Against	Venue	Date
Queensland	4/368	Western Australia	Allan Border Field	1 March 2021
New South Wales	5/337	Australian Capital Territory	Phillip Oval	7 March 2021
Queensland	8/317	Victoria	Junction Oval	27 March 2021
Victoria	7/287	Australian Capital Territory	Blacktown International Sports Park No.2	21 February 2021
Australian Capital Territory	6/275	Western Australia	WACA Ground	12 March 2021

=== Most runs ===
Player	Team	Mat	Inns	NO	Runs	HS	Ave	BF	SR	100	50
Elyse Villani	Victoria	9	9	2	611	135*	87.28	722	84.62	3	2
Georgia Redmayne	Queensland	8	8	4	531	134*	132.75	582	91.23	2	2
Katie Mack	Australian Capital Territory	8	8	1	418	106*	59.71	515	81.16	1	3
Rachael Haynes	New South Wales	6	6	1	413	139*	82.60	426	96.94	2	2
Bridget Patterson	South Australia	7	7	1	371	108*	61.83	587	63.20	2	1

=== Most wickets ===
Player	Team	Mat	Inns	Overs	Mdns	Runs	Wkts	BBI	Ave	SR	4WI
Molly Strano	Victoria	6	6	46.3	2	202	14	4/46	14.42	19.9	1
Georgia Wareham	Victoria	6	6	53.0	3	249	13	4/46	19.15	24.4	1
Kim Garth	Victoria	9	9	77.0	5	298	13	3/45	22.92	35.5	0
Samantha Betts	South Australia	8	8	56.0	3	246	11	3/14	22.36	30.5	0
Nicola Carey	Tasmania	7	7	59.5	4	252	11	3/26	22.90	32.6	0
