= Jacob Anstey =

Australian rules footballer (born 1978)

Personal information
- Full name: Jacob Anstey
- Born: 27 January 1978 (age 48)
- Original team: Tuggeranong Hawks Football Club
- Height: 176 cm (5 ft 9 in)
- Weight: 71 kg (157 lb)
- Position: Forward pocket

Playing career^{1}
Years	Club	Games (Goals)
1997–98	Carlton	16 (5)
- ^{1} Playing statistics correct to the end of 1999.

Jacob Anstey (born 27 January 1978) is a former professional Australian rules footballer from the Australian Capital Territory who played for Carlton Football Club in the Australian Football League (AFL).

A lightly framed goal sneak originally from AFL Canberra club Tuggeranong Hawks Football Club, Anstey was taken by Carlton with the 63rd selection in the 1995 AFL draft and made his senior debut in round 7 of the 1997 AFL season against Richmond Football Club at the Melbourne Cricket Ground, collecting eight disposals in a victorious Carlton side. Anstey kicked his first AFL goal in round 9 against Fremantle and two more in round 15 against Melbourne. He finished the season in the line-up for the round 22 match against Richmond, but in a crucial match to keep their finals hopes alive, Carlton lost to Richmond and Anstey only had two disposals for the match.

Anstey's first match of the 1998 AFL season was in the close round 3 loss to Essendon Football Club but Anstey played arguably the best game of his career that day in gathering 13 disposals and kicking an important goal. He struggled, however, to establish himself in a Carlton line-up for most of the season. He played his last AFL game in the round 19 loss to Melbourne. In his final season, he played seven games and kicked one goal.

St Kilda selected him late in the 1998 AFL draft, but he never managed a senior game for the Saints and was delisted after the 1999 AFL season.
