= 1924 FTARFL season =

1st season of the Federal Territory Australian Rules Football League

- Date: ended September 1924
- Premiers: Acton; 1st premiership
- Minor premiers: Acton; 1st minor premiership

The 1924 FTARFL season was the inaugural season of the Federal Territory Australian Rules Football League (FTARFL), the highest-level Australian rules football competition in the Federal Capital Territory (FCT). (Note: The Federal Capital Territory (FCT) was renamed to the Australian Capital Territory (ACT) in 1938.) Four clubs participated − Acton, Canberra, Duntroon and Federals.

Acton won the inaugural FTARFL premiership, defeating Canberra by 25 points in the 1924 FTARFL Grand Final.

== Ladder ==
Pos	Team	Pld	W	L	D	PF	PA	PP	Pts
1	Acton (P)								
2	Canberra								
3	Federals								
4	Duntroon								

Rules for classification: 1) points; 2) percentage; 3) number of points for.
(P) Premiers

== Finals ==
=== Grand Final ===
1924 FTARFL Grand Final
Acton	def.	Canberra
10.7 (67)	Q1; Q2; Q3; Final	6.6 (42)
P. Morgan 7	Goals
P. Morgan	Best
