= James Meiklejohn =

Australian rules footballer (born 1984)

Personal information
- Full name: James Meiklejohn
- Born: 28 June 1984 (age 42)
- Original team: Tuggeranong / NSW/ACT Rams
- Draft: 71st overall, 2003 Rookie Draft
- Height: 197 cm (6 ft 6 in)
- Weight: 95 kg (209 lb)
- Position: Ruckman

Playing career^{1}
Years	Club	Games (Goals)
2003–2004	Sydney	6 (0)
- ^{1} Playing statistics correct to the end of 2004.

James Meiklejohn (/ˈmiːkəlˌdʒɒn/; born 28 June 1984) is an Australian rules footballer who played for Sydney in the Australian Football League (AFL) in 2003 and 2004.

He was drafted from the NSW-ACT Under 18s side with the 71st selection in the 2003 Rookie Draft. He played six games in two seasons at the Swans before he was delisted at the end of the 2004 season.

Mieklejohn captained Port Adelaide Magpies in the SANFL.
