= West Canberra Football Club =

Former Australian rules football club

West Canberra Football Club is a former Australian Rules Football club based in the Australian Capital Territory that played in the ACT AFL from 1974 – 1987. West Canberra's guernsey was black and white (similar to Collingwood), and the team was nicknamed the Magpies. West Canberra merged with Belconnen Football Club to form the Belconnen Magpies Football Club. West Canberra never won an ACT AFL premiership.

== See also ==
- Belconnen Magpies Football Club
- AFL Canberra
