= Goulburn Football Club =

The Goulburn Football Club is a defunct Australian rules football club from Goulburn, New South Wales. The club competed in the CANFL from 1932 - 1936. The club wore pale blue colours and were known as the 'Waratahs'.

== Premierships ==
Goulburn won one CANFL title in 1932 when they defeated Manuka 7.18 (60) to 5.6 (36).

== See also ==
- AFL Canberra
