= Hannah Wallett =

Australian rules footballer (born 1990)

Personal information
- Born: 20 November 1990 (age 35)
- Original team: Belconnen (AFL Canberra)
- Debut: Round 1, 2017, Greater Western Sydney vs. Adelaide, at Thebarton Oval
- Height: 172 cm (5 ft 8 in)
- Position: Forward

Playing career^{1}
| Years | Club | Games (Goals) |
| 2017 | Greater Western Sydney | 4 (1) |
- ^{1} Playing statistics correct to the end of 2017.

Hannah Wallett (born 20 November 1990) is an Australian rules footballer who played for the Greater Western Sydney Giants in the AFL Women's competition. Wallett was recruited by Greater Western Sydney as a free agent in October 2016. She made her debut in the thirty-six point loss to Adelaide at Thebarton Oval in the opening round of the 2017 season. She played four matches in her debut season. She was delisted at the end of the 2017 season.
