= Sheldyn Cooper =

Australian cricketer

Personal information
- Full name: Sheldyn Ashlee Cooper
- Born: 29 July 2000 (age 26); Middle Swan, Western Australia
- Batting: Right-handed
- Bowling: Right-arm medium-fast
- Role: Bowler

Domestic team information
- Years: Team
- 2017/18–2022/23: Western Australia

Career statistics
Competition	WLA
Matches	13
Runs scored	19
Batting average	8.00
100s/50s	0/0
Top score	5
Balls bowled	237
Wickets	3
Bowling average	82.00
5 wickets in innings	0
10 wickets in match	0
Best bowling	1/11
Catches/stumpings	1/–
- Source: CricketArchive, 26 March 2021

Sheldyn Ashlee Cooper (born 29 July 2000) is an Australian cricketer who plays as a right-arm medium-fast bowler and right-handed batter. She last played for Western Australia in the Women's National Cricket League (WNCL). She made her WNCL debut on 17 February 2021 against Tasmania.
