= Googong Hogs =

Names
- Full name: Googong Hogs Football Club
- Former name: HMAS Harman Australian Football Club Incorporated (1976–2015)
- Nickname(s): Hogs, Hoggies

Club details
- Founded: 1976; 50 years ago
- Colours: Blue Gold
- Competition: AFL Canberra Community Division
- Premierships: AFLC Community Men's (2): 2011; 2015; AFLC Community Women's (1): 2023
- Ground: Rockley Oval

Uniforms
Home

Other information
- Official website: googonghogs.com.au

The Googong Hogs are an Australian rules football based in the New South Wales town of Googong. The club competes in the AFL Canberra Community Division and plays its home games at Rockley Oval.

== History ==
Googong was founded in 1976 as the HMAS Harman Australian Football Club, nicknamed the "Hogs". The club was located around Royal Australian Navy (RAN) base HMAS Harman, allowing both civilians and defence personnel (regardless of rank) the opportunity to play for the club. Because of the club's origins in the Australian Defence Force (ADF), it has a rivalry with the ADFA Rams.

Harman initially competed in the Monaro Australian Football League (MAFL), making its first grand final in 1981 before being defeated by ANU. The club formed a reserves team in 1982.

After a winless 1984 season, the club won its first premiership in Division 2 in 1985. The club was undefeated in 1986 and won a second premiership in Division 1.

In 1995, Harman joined the Canberra District Football League (CDFL), winning the Division 2 premiership the same year and being promoted to Division 1 for the 1996 season. During the 2002 season, the club was known as the "OZINVEST Harman Hogs" under sponsorship naming rights. By 2005, Harman had returned to the MAFL.

At the end of the 2015 season, Harman changed its name to the Googong Hogs, less than two years after residents moved into the newly-developed township of Googong.

Googong introduced a women's team for the first time in 2023, entering Community Division 1 and winning a premiership in its first season.

== Honours ==
=== Premierships ===
Competition	Division	Wins	Years won
AFL Canberra Community Men's	Third Grade	1	2011
AFL Canberra Community Men's	Fourth Grade	1	2015
AFL Canberra Community Women's	Division 1	1	2023
Canberra District Football League	Division 2	1	1995
Monaro Australian Football League	Division 1	1	1986
Monaro Australian Football League	Division 2	1	1985
