= Brooke Harris =

Australian cricketer (born 1997)

Personal information
- Full name: Brooke Lee Harris
- Born: 27 August 1997 (age 29); Adelaide, South Australia
- Batting: Right-handed
- Bowling: Right-arm medium
- Role: Bowler

Domestic team information
- Years: Team
- 2016/17–2022/23: South Australia

Career statistics
Competition	WLA
Matches	20
Runs scored	10
Batting average	5.00
100s/50s	0/0
Top score	6
Balls bowled	848
Wickets	23
Bowling average	29.73
5 wickets in innings	0
10 wickets in match	0
Best bowling	3/41
Catches/stumpings	5/–
- Source: CricketArchive, 17 September 2023

Brooke Lee Harris (born 27 August 1997) is an Australian cricketer who plays as a right-arm medium bowler and right-handed batter. She last played for the South Australian Scorpions in the Women's National Cricket League (WNCL). Harris is a two-time recipient of the Karen Rolton Medal, the highest honour for women in Australian Premier Cricket. She made her WNCL debut on 16 October 2016 against Tasmania.
