= Gungahlin Football Club =

Gungahlin Jets

Names
- Full name: Gungahlin Jets Australian Football and Netball Club
- Nickname: Jets

2025 AFL Canberra season
- Home-and-away season: 6th (Wooden Spooners)

Club details
- Founded: 1981; 45 years ago
- Colours
- Competition: AFL Canberra & Netball Australian Capital Territory
- President: Rob McElhinney (Seniors); Jimmy Risbey (Juniors); Chrissie Erikson (Netball)
- Chairperson: WG Cooper
- Coach: Russell Stewart (Men's); Bobby Moroney (Women's)
- Premierships: 8 (5 in Div 2, 3 in Div 3)
- Grounds: Gungahlin Enclosed Oval
- Amaroo Oval
- Lyneham Netball Centre

Uniforms
Home

Other information
- Official website: gungahlinjets.com.au

Gungahlin Jets Australian Football and Netball Club is an Australian sports club based in Gungahlin, Australian Capital Territory. The Australian rules football squad competes in the AFL Canberra first grade competition. The club also supports and has teams in all age groups from Auskick & AuskickPro, through to senior level. The netball component of the club competes in all age levels from junior to senior (adult) in Netball Australian Capital Territory.

== History ==
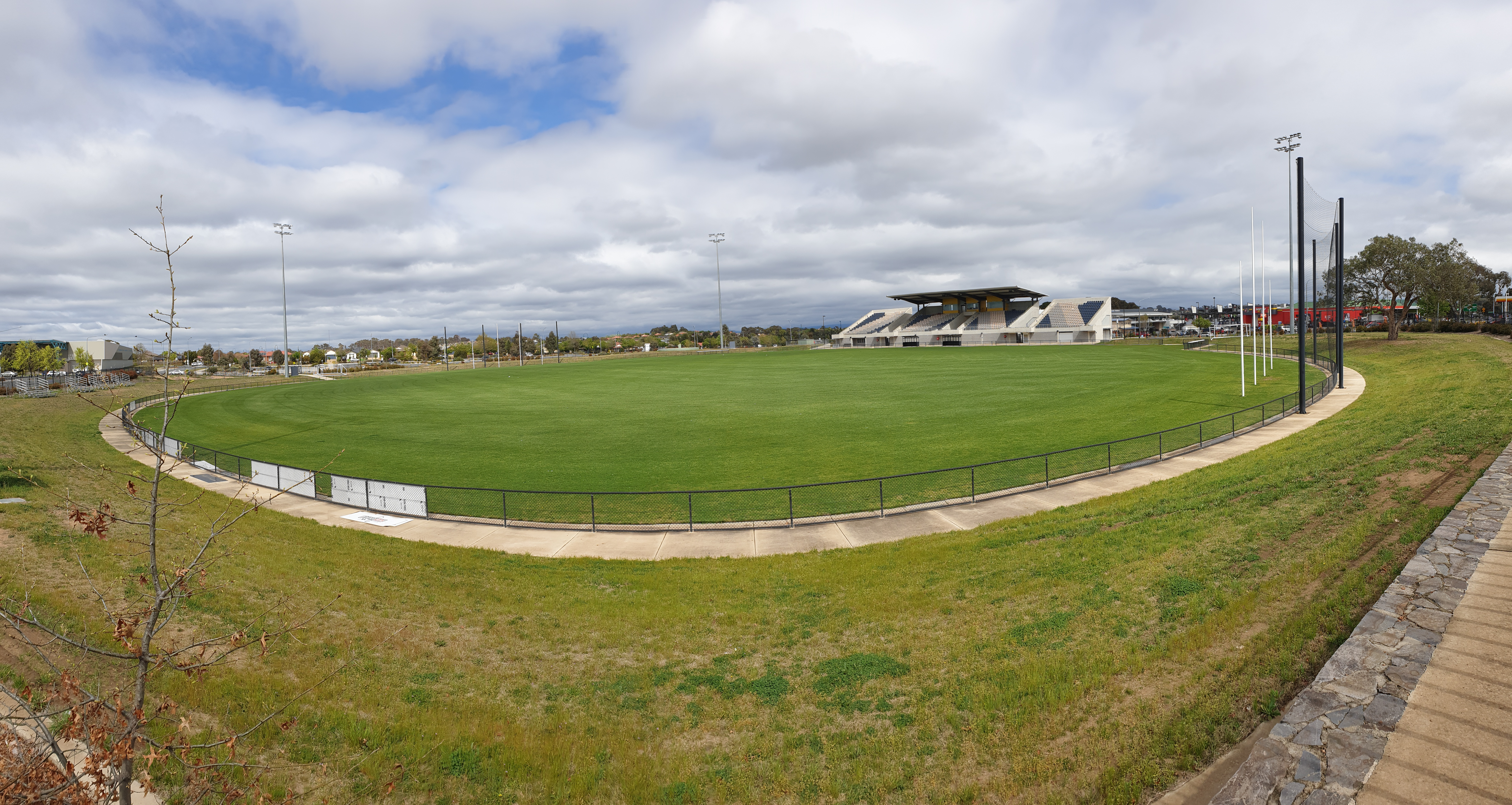
Gungahlin Enclosed Oval - home of the Jets

The Gungahlin Jets were established in 1981 and entered the Monaro AFL division 2 competition in 1982. The club won the MAFL division 2 premiership in their first season.

In 2014, the Liberal government withdrew a $66,000 grant for infrastructure funding provided by the previous Labor government, sparking a controversy. The club was burgled twice in a month; drinks and water bottles intended for fundraising were stolen, and on the second occasion, a television.

The club anticipates fielding 500 players across senior, junior and women's divisions in the 2024 season.

== AFL players ==
The following Gungahlin players have played in the AFL:

- Jack Steele (Greater Western Sydney and St Kilda)

== Honours ==
- Monaro Australian Football League
  - Division 2 (5): 1982, 1987, 1988, 1989, 1994
- AFL Canberra
  - Division 2 (3): 2006, 2007, 2008

=== Grand Finals ===
Year	League	Opponent
1982	Monaro AFL Div 2	RMC Rams
1987	Monaro AFL Div 2	Tuggeranong Hawks
1988	Monaro AFL Div 2	ANU Griffins
1989	Monaro AFL Div 2	ANU Griffins
1994	Monaro AFL Div 2	Harman Hogs
2006	AFL Canberra Div 3	ANU Griffins
2007	AFL Canberra Div 3	ANU Griffins
2008	AFL Canberra Div 3	Belconnen Magpies
