= Gungahlin Enclosed Oval =

Stadium in Canberra, Australia

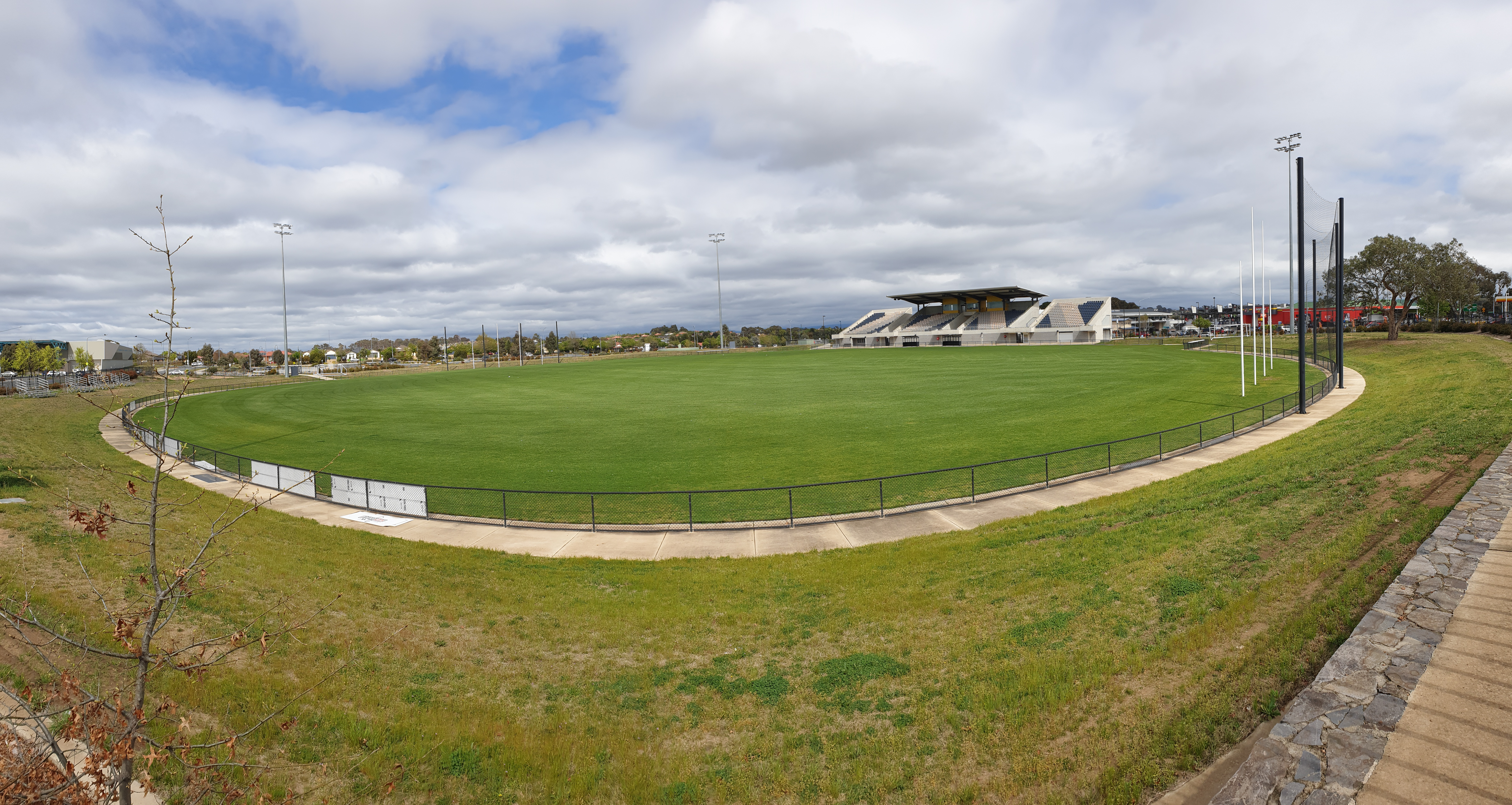
- Interactive map of Gungahlin Enclosed Oval
- Location: 17 Warwick St, Gungahlin, ACT
- Coordinates: 35°11′6″S 149°7′38″E
- Owner: ACT Government
- Capacity: 1,150
- Surface: Grass
- Scoreboard: Yes
- Record attendance: 1,603

Construction
- Opened: 7 March 2014
- Cost: $12.5 million
- Architect: Stewart Architecture
- Project manager: Brett Naylor
- Main contractor: IQON

Tenants
- Gungahlin United; Gungahlin Jets; Gungahlin Eagles; Gungahlin Bulls

Gungahlin Enclosed Oval is a multi-use stadium located in the north Canberra region of Gungahlin, Australian Capital Territory. It is the home ground for Gungahlin United, Gungahlin Jets, Gungahlin Bulls and Gungahlin Eagles. The venue has a seating capacity of 1,150 people and an overall capacity of 5,000.

== Stadium Facilities ==
The playing surface is made of high-quality, water-efficient turf and is lit to the Australian Standard for sporting competition. The grandstand provides seating for 1,150 people, of which 550 is under cover, and includes team and officials' changing rooms, public toilets, canteen and storage for both users and maintenance staff. Rooms are provided for coaches, the ground announcer and the operator of the electronic scoreboard. There is also a club room which can be used for after/pre-match functions.

== Primary Use ==
Gungahlin Enclosed Oval primary use is servicing the local Gungahlin representative teams in top flight territory competitions across the major four sports (Soccer, Australian Football, Rugby Union and Rugby League). The four primary tenants of the facility are Gungahlin United FC, Gungahlin Jets, Gungahlin Eagles and Gungahlin Bulls.

== Events History ==
=== 2015 FFA Cup ===
Principle tenant Gungahlin United FC (Gunners) qualified for the FFA Cup and the right to host a round of 32 clash by beating Belconnen United FC 1-0 in the Federation Cup Final on 20 June 2015. 4 August 2015, Gunners hosted their round of 32 FFA Cup tie against former NSL powerhouse and current NPL club Sydney Olympic FC in the club's first FFA Cup match in its history at Gungahlin Enclosed. A crowd of 1,603 turned out to watch Gunners go down 1-0 in defeat thanks to an eighty-second-minute goal to the visitors from Sydney.

=== 2015 Asian Cup ===
Gungahlin Enclosed Oval was selected as a back-up reserve training facility for the nations based in Canberra for the 2015 Asian Cup tournament in case McKellar Park became unavailable.

=== A-League pre-season friendlies ===
Gungahlin Enclosed Oval has played host to pre-season matches involving A-League opposition. The below table details these matches:

Year	Home team	Away team	Reference
2015	Canberra Olympic	Central Coast Mariners	
2015	Gungahlin United FC	Central Coast Mariners	

=== Representative Women's AFL ===
On 12 April 2015, AFL Canberra women hosted AFL Sydney women in a match at Gungahlin Enclosed. Sydney won the match 53–18.

== Records ==
Record attendance: 1,603 (Gungahlin United FC vs Sydney Olympic FC, 4 August 2015, FFA Cup Round of 32)
