= Tuggeranong Valley Football Club =

Australian rules football club

Tuggeranong

Names
- Full name: Tuggeranong Valley Australian Football Netball Club
- Club song: "The Tuggies Roar" (sung to "Glory Glory Alleluia")

2025 AFL Canberra season
- Home-and-away season: 5th

Club details
- Founded: 1968; 58 years ago
- Colours
- Competition: AFL Canberra First Division
- President: Leo Lahey
- Coach: Peter Ashcroft
- Captain: Lachlan Monger
- Premierships: AFL Canberra (1); 1986
- Ground: Greenway Oval

Uniforms
Home

Other information
- Official website: tuggeranongfc.com.au

The Tuggeranong Valley Football Club is a semi-professional, community based Australian rules football club based in Tuggeranong, Australian Capital Territory. They competed in the North East Australian Football League from 2011–13 and as of 2014 are a member club of the AFL Canberra First Grade competition.

The club also fields teams in the AFL Canberra rising stars (under 19) competition, third grade and women's competitions.

== History ==
The club was actually formed as long ago as 1968 by a group of Department of Supply employees, recently transferred to Canberra from Melbourne. Adopting red and white as its colours, the team bore the name of Eastlake-Woden in recognition of the fact that it was sponsored by the Eastlake Football Club. Eastlake-Woden later became South Woden, and later still Sutherland. They first found competition in the Monaro Football League. They are the only club in graduate from a minor league into the Territory's major football competition. In 1976 Sutherland was admitted to the ACTAFL at under 19 level before adding reserves and senior teams in 1977 and 1979 respectively.

Initially, the team found the going tough, but following a name change to Tuggeranong in 1983 fortunes began to improve. In 1986, under captain-coach Hans Heystraten, premiership success was finally achieved following a thrilling one-point grand final defeat of one of Canberra's foremost perennial football forces, Queanbeyan.

In 1994 the club welcomed former St Kilda, Ainslie and Central District identity Kevin "Cowboy" Neale as senior coach and immediately adopted the Cowboys emblem, which it retained until forging an alliance with AFL club Hawthorn in 2003, whereupon it became known as the Hawks.

The club has seen disappointing results since then as 2002 was the last year the first grade team made the finals. Numerous times the club has finished fifth on the ladder, just missing out on finals as well as claiming the wooden spoon from 2008–10.

Since 2013, under Senior Coach Nathan Costigan the club reached back to back finals campaigns, including the 2015 preliminary final. The reserve grade side was crowned 2015 Premiers. Costigan resigned in 2017 and Peter Ashcroft was appointed Senior Coach.

In 2020 the club reconstituted itself to become "Tuggeranong Valley Football Club".

== Premierships ==
- ACTAFL 1st Grade (Men)
  - 1986
- AFL Canberra 1st Grade (Women)
  - 2004, 2007, 2009, 2010, 2013, 2014
- AFL Canberra Reserve Grade
  - 1998, 2015
- AFL Canberra Colts/Under 18
  - 1994, 1995, 1996, 1997, 2007
- AFL Canberra 3rd Grade
  - 2000, 2001
- AFL Canberra 4th Grade
  - 2011
- Monaro Division
  - 1976 (as South Woden), 1986 (in Division 2)

== Notable players ==
Several former players from the club have gone on to compete in higher-level competitions, including Justin Blumfield (Essendon), Aaron Hamill (Carlton and St Kilda), Jacob Anstey (Carlton), Joseph McGrath (Western Bulldogs) and James Meiklejohn (Sydney and Port Adelaide).

== Mulrooney Medallists ==
- Stafford Cooper – 1998
- Luke Jess – 2003
- Craig Healey – 2009
