= Phillip Oval =

Sports ground in Canberra

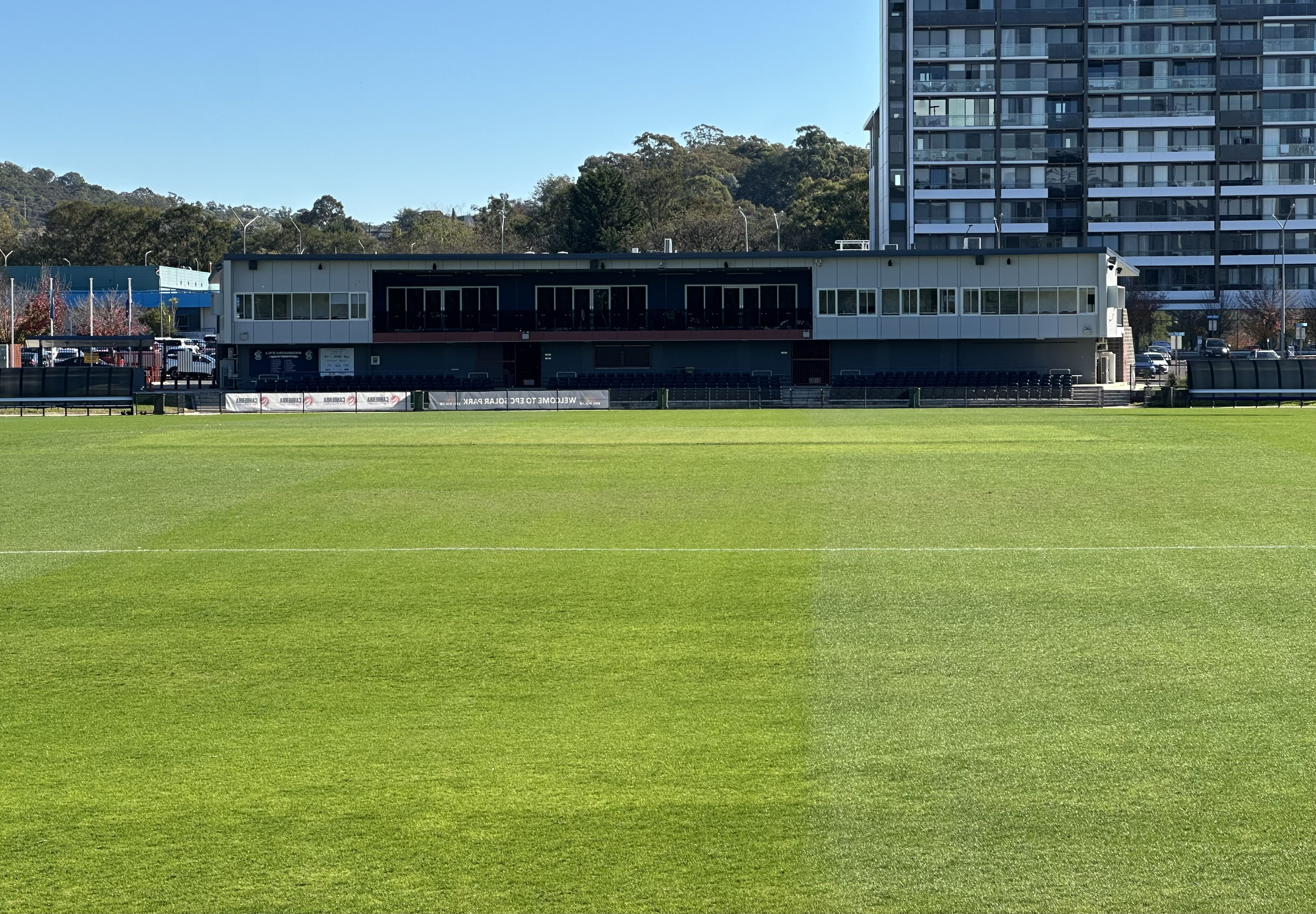
- Phillip Oval in May 2026
- Interactive map of Phillip Oval
- Location: Phillip, Canberra, Australian Capital Territory
- Coordinates: 35°20′24″S 149°05′10″E
- Owner: ACT Government
- Surface: Grass

Tenants
- Canberra Football Club; ACT Meteors (Cricket); ACT Comets (Cricket)

Phillip Oval (known under naming rights as EPC Solar Park) is an Australian rules football and cricket ground located in the Canberra suburb of Phillip.

== Usage ==
The ground was upgraded in 2018, with a renovated pavilion, changing rooms, and the addition of floodlights and an electronic scoreboard.

=== Australian rules football ===
Phillip Oval is viewed as the second tier ground for Australian rules football in Canberra, after Manuka Oval. Canberra Football Club train and play home matches at the ground, and have increasingly moved to playing at Phillip Oval since its redevelopment in 2018.

=== Cricket ===
The ground is the secondary ground of ACT Meteors, after Manuka Oval. They played their first match at the ground in January 2020, against England as a warm-up for the touring side's upcoming tri-series. Later that season, the side used it for its first Women's National Cricket League games, playing two matches in February 2020. The ground was the Meteors' sole home ground in the 2020–21 and 2021–22 seasons. The ground was also used for all six matches on England A's tour of Australia in 2021–22.
