= Belconnen Football Club =

Belconnen Magpies

Names
- Full name: Belconnen Magpies Football Club
- Nickname: Magpies
- Club song: "We're a Happy Team Belconnen" (to the tune of "Yankee Doodle Boy")

2025 AFL Canberra season
- After finals: 4th (Elimination Final)
- Home-and-away season: 3rd

Club details
- Founded: 1987; 39 years ago
- Colours
- Competition: AFL Canberra
- President: Scott Reid
- Coach: James Bennett
- Captain: Jack Baker
- Premierships: AFL Canberra (5); 2002, 2003, 2004, 2009, 2023
- Ground: The Adero Law Nest (Kippax Oval)

Uniforms
Home

Other information
- Official website: belconnenfc.com.au

The Belconnen Magpies Football Club is an Australian rules football club which competes in the AFL Canberra. They previously played in the now defunct North East Australian Football League competition.

== History ==
Originally known as the Turner Football Club, the club became known as Belconnen in 1970 and was admitted to the Canberra Australian National Football League in 1971. Wearing a navy blue guernsey with a white monogram, the club was known as the "Bees" from 1971 until 1979, then as the "Blues" following the ANU Blues' withdrawal from the league during 1979.

Before the 1986 season, the Belconnen club merged with the West Canberra Football Club to become the "Belconnen Magpies". The team began to wear the traditional magpie black and white stripes and in 1991 the club moved its headquarters to Kippax. In 1998 the colour teal was added to the existing black and white jumper.

The newly formed team did not taste premiership success until 2002 when they won three consecutive premierships. The club also clinched the 2009 premiership, with a six-point grand final win over Ainslie. The Magpies then went on to win their fifth premiership in 2023, defeating Ainslie by 39 points.

== AFL players ==
The following Belconnen players have played in the AFL:

- Brett Allison (North Melbourne and Sydney)
- Logan Austin (Port Adelaide and St Kilda)
- Matthew Lokan (Collingwood)
- Don Pyke (West Coast)
- Jack Steele (Greater Western Sydney and St Kilda)

== Honours ==
=== Club ===
AFL Canberra (5): 2002, 2003, 2004, 2009, 2023

==== Premierships ====
Year	Opponent	Score	Venue
2002	Queanbeyan Tigers	24.19 (163) – 14.6 (90)	Manuka Oval
2003	Queanbeyan Tigers	11.14 (80) – 11.8 (74)	Manuka Oval
2004	Queanbeyan Tigers	14.20 (104) – 8.9 (57)	Manuka Oval
2009	Ainslie Tri-Colours	11.13 (79) – 10.13 (73)	Manuka Oval
2023	Ainslie Tri-Colours	10.11 (71) – 4.8 (32)	EPC Solar Park

=== Individual ===
==== Mulrooney Medalists ====
- 2023 – Thomas Simpson
- 2022 – Luke Wharton
- 2019 – Beau Walker
- 2017 – Beau Walker
- 2016 – James Bennett
- 2015 – Isaac Taylor
- 2013 – James Bennett
- 2012 – Shane Harris
- 2005 – Jared Ilett
- 2003 – Steve Hazelman
- 2001 – Steve Mahar
- 1999 – Shane Clarke
- 1991 – Brent Smith
- 1984 – Geoff Hocking (Belconnen)
- 1978 – Greg Eaves (West Canberra)
- 1976 – Mike Demaine (West Canberra)
- 1975 – Robert White (Belconnen)
