= AFL Canberra =

Australian rules football league and governing body

- Current season, competition or edition: 2025
- Formerly: Federal Territory Australian Rules Football League, Canberra Australian Football League, Canberra Australian National Football League, ACTAFL
- Sport: Australian rules football
- Founded: 1924; 102 years ago
- First season: 1924
- No. of teams: 18 (6 in Premier Division)
- Region: Australian Capital Territory; New South Wales
- Most recent champion: Ainslie (2026)
- Most titles: Ainslie (29)
- Website: aflcanberra.com.au

AFL Canberra is the governing body for Australian rules football in the Australian Capital Territory (ACT) and the Southern Tablelands region of New South Wales (NSW). The name also refers to the senior and junior leagues operated by the governing body.

== History ==
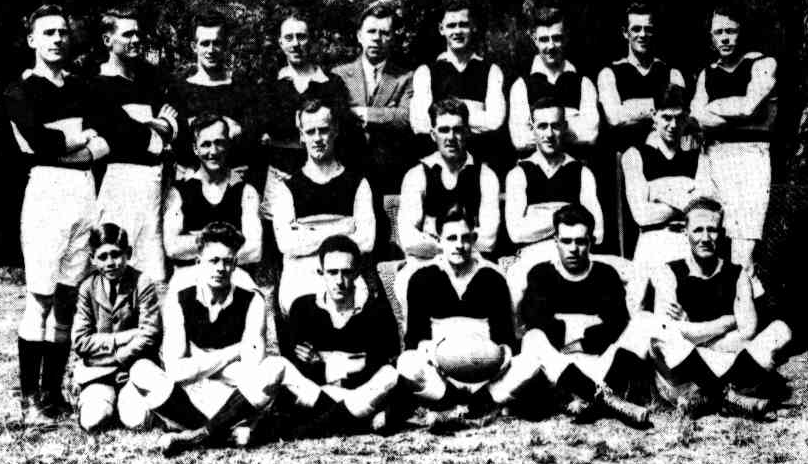
Premiers of the ANF 1927

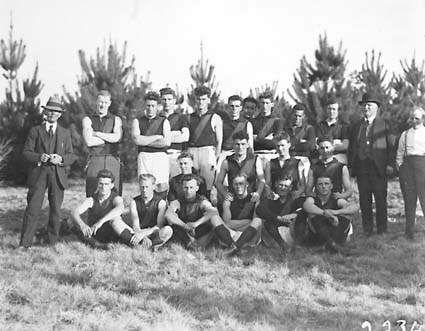
Federal Football team, 1926 Federal Territory premiers.

The league was founded as the Federal Territory Australian Rules Football League in 1924 with founding members Acton and Queanbeyan. The following year, the premiership was contested by 4 clubs including Canberra, Federal and Duntroon. By 1926 the competition had gained popularity and was contested by 5 clubs.

AFL Canberra was once a very popular local league, however since the introduction of the Swans and matches featuring AFL clubs being played at Manuka Oval, the league's home ground, and the growth of local rugby union, rugby league and association football competitions, AFL Canberra has experienced the loss of clubs and spectator support.

In November 2010 the five AFL Canberra Premier Division clubs merged with the Premier Division clubs of the Queensland Australian Football League to form the North East Australian Football League. From 2011 onwards, the AFL Canberra Premier Division together with the reserve sides from the Sydney Swans and Greater Western Sydney Giants would form the NEAFL Eastern Conference. However the NEAFL was later dissolved due primarily to the COVID pandemic and associated financial pressures.

== League names ==
The AFL Canberra has been through a number of forms.

- 1924–1926 Federal Territory Australian Rules Football League (FTARFL);
- 1927–1974 Canberra Australian National Football League (CANFL);
- 1975–1999 Australian Capital Territory Australian Football League (ACTAFL);
- 2000–2010 AFL Canberra
- 2011–2020 Eastern Conference of North East Australian Football League (NEAFL)
- 2011–now AFL Canberra

== Clubs ==
Clubs listed by highest grade of competition.

Club	Colours	Nickname	Home Ground	Former League	Est.	Years in AFLC	AFLC Senior Premierships	
Club	Colours	Nickname	Home Ground	Former League	Est.	Years in AFLC	Total	Most recent
First Grade & Second Grade
Ainslie		Tricolours	Alan Ray Oval, Ainslie, ACT	–	1927	1927–	29	2026
Batemans Bay		Seahawks	Hanging Rock Oval, Batemans Bay, NSW	SCAFL	1984	1990–1998, 2011–	2	2023*
Belconnen		Magpies	Adero Law Nest, Holt, ACT	–	1987	1987–	5	2023
Eastlake (South. District 1991–95)		Demons	Kingston Oval, Griffith, ACT	–	1991	1991–	2	2025
Gungahlin		Jets	Gunghalin Enclosed Oval, Gunghalin, ACT	MAFL	1981	1996–	3	2008
Queanbeyan		Tigers	Margaret Donoghoe Sports Complex, Karabar, NSW	–	1925	1925–1943, 1946–1951, 1958–1965, 1970–	15	2024
Tuggeranong Valley (Sutherland 1977–82)		Valley	Greenway Oval, Greenway, ACT	MAFL	1968	1977–	1	1986
Community Division 1
ADFA (Defence Academy 1987–97)		Rams	ADFA Oval, Campbell, ACT	MAFL	1986	1986–1988, 1996–	8	2019
ANU		Griffins	South Oval, Acton, ACT	MAFL	1961	1962–1979, 1986–1987, 1996–	7	2022
Googong (Harman 1976–2015)		Hogs	Rockley Oval, Googong, NSW	MAFL	1976	1995–	2	2015
Goulburn		Swans	Goodhew Park, Goulburn, NSW	–	2004	2004–	2	2009
Woden		Blues	Phillip Oval, Phillip, ACT	–	1996	1996–	7	2025
Yass		Roos	Joe O'Connor Park, Yass, NSW	–	2002	2002–	1	2008
Community Division 2
Cootamundra		Blues	Clarke Oval, Cootamundra	FFL	1960	2004–	3	2017
Molonglo (Murrumbidgee 1994–2013)		Juggernauts	Stirling Oval, Stirling, ACT	MAFL	1994	1995–	1	2005
Murrumbateman		Eagles	Murrumbateman Recreational Oval, Murrumbateman, NSW	–	2019	2020–	2	2023
Southern Cats (Cooma 1976–2015)		Cats	Snowy Oval, Cooma, NSW	MAFL	1976	1996–	1	2018
Rising Stars (U18)
Marist		Blue and Blues	Lindwall Oval, Pearce, ACT	–	1973	2000–	No senior teams	
Junior grades only
Belconnen Cats		Cats	Holt Oval, Holt, ACT	–		?-present	No senior teams	
Weston Creek-Molonglo		Wildcats	Stirling District Playing Fields, Stirling, ACT	–		?-present	No senior teams	

*not won in this grade

=== Uniforms ===
ADFA	Ainslie	ANU	Batemans Bay	Belconnen	Cootamundra
Eastlake	Goulburn	Googong	Gungahlin	Marist	Molonglo
Murrumbateman	Queanbeyan	Southern (Cooma)	Tuggeranong	Woden Valley	Yass

=== Locations ===
Point colours indicate club's highest level of competition.

- Red = First grade
- Yellow = Community Division 1
- Orange = Community Division 2
- Blue = Rising Stars

Club locations – ACT	Club locations – New South Wales

== 2025 Grades ==
=== Men ===
Club	1st Grade	2nd Grade	Community Division 1	Community Division 2	Rising Stars	Total
Ainslie	Yes	Yes	Yes	Yes	Yes	5
ADFA			Yes	Yes		2
ANU			Yes	Yes		2
Batemans Bay	Yes	Yes			Yes	3
Belconnen	Yes	Yes	Yes		Yes	4
Cootamundra				Yes		1
Eastlake	Yes	Yes	Yes		Yes	4
Googong			Yes	Yes		2
Goulburn			Yes			1
Gungahlin	Yes	Yes				2
Marist					Yes	1
Molonglo				Yes		1
Murrumbateman				Yes		1
Queanbeyan	Yes	Yes			Yes	3
Southern Cats				Yes		1
Tuggeranong Valley	Yes	Yes			Yes	3
Woden			Yes	Yes		2
Yass			Yes			1

=== Women ===
Club	1st Grade	2nd Grade	Community Division 1	Rising Stars	Total
Ainslie	Yes	Yes		Yes	3
ADFA			Yes		1
ANU			Yes		1
Batemans Bay	Yes			Yes	2
Belconnen	Yes	Yes		Yes	3
Eastlake	Yes	Yes		Yes	3
Googong			Yes		1
Gungahlin	Yes	Yes			2
Molonglo			Yes		1
Queanbeyan	Yes	Yes		Yes	3
Southern Cats			Yes		1
Tuggeranong Valley	Yes	Yes		Yes	3
Woden			Yes		1
Yass			Yes		1

== Former clubs ==
Club	Colours	Nickname	Home Ground	Former League	Est.	Years in AFLC	AFLC Senior Premierships		Fate
Club	Colours	Nickname	Home Ground	Former League	Est.	Years in AFLC	Total	Most recent	Fate
2 STT (No. 2 School of Technical Training)				–	1942	1942–1943	0	–	Folded after 1943 season
Acton		Jackaroos		–	1924	1924–1951, 1958–1973	2	1927	Disbanded due to lack of financial and player support after 1973 season
Belconnen (original)		Blues		–	1971	1971–1985	0	–	Merged with West Canberra to form Belconnen Magpies following 1985 season
Blandfordia (Canberra 1924)				–	1925	1924–1925	0	–	Folded after 1925 season
Campbelltown		Blues	Bob Prenter Oval, Macquarie Fields, NSW	SAFL	1975	1996–1998	0		Returned to AFL Sydney following 1998 season
Canberra Wildcats (Weston Creek 1982–98, 2003–06; Wildcats 1999–2002)		Wildcats				1982, 1991–2007	0	–	Folded due to lack of support after 2007 season
City				–	1944	1944	0	–	Folded after 1944 season
Duntroon				–	1924	1924	0	–	Folded after 1924 season
Eastlake (original)		Demons	Kingston Oval, Griffith, ACT	–	1926	1926–1941, 1945–1990	17	1978	Merged with Manuka to form Southern District following 1990 season
Eastlake-Manuka				–	1942	1942–1943	1	1942	De-merged into Eastlake and Manuka following 1943 season
Federals	Dark with light sash			–	1924	1924–1927	2	1926	Folded after 1927 season
Goulburn				–	1932	1932–1936	1	1932	Folded after 1936 season
Kingston		Wolves	Kingston Oval, Griffith, ACT	MAFL		1995–2000	4	2000	Absorbed by Eastlake following 2000 season
Manuka Weston (Manuka 1927–85)		Bombers	Manuka Oval, Griffith, ACT	–	1927	1928–1941, 1945–1990	15	1981	Merged with Eastlake to form Southern District following 1990 season
Mines Rovers			Captains Flat	–	1938	1938–1939	0	–	Folded after 1939 season
Navy				–	1944	1944–1949	1	1944	Folded after 1949 season
Queanbeyan-Acton		Tigers		–	1952	1952–1957	3	1956	De-merged into Queanbeyan and Acton following 1957 season
RAAF				–	1940	1940–1946	0	–	Disbanded due to the end of WWII
Red Hill				–	1926	1926	0	–	Folded after 1926 season
Riverina Lions		Lions	Gumly Oval, Gumly Gumly, NSW	–	2003	2003–2021	1	2018	Folded after 2021 season
Royal Military College		Cadets		–	1942	1942–1976, 1986–1988, 1998–2007	3	1986	Folded when the Royal Military College withdrew all sports clubs at end of 2007 season
Sydney Swans reserves		Swans		SAFL	1874	2003–2010	4	2008	Formed North East Australian FL in 2011
Turner				–	1948	1948–1965, 1969–1970	0	–	Folded after 1970 season. Re-formed as Belconnen in 1971.
Turner-Queanbeyan				–	1966	1966–1968	0	–	De-merged into Turner and Queanbeyan following 1968 season
University of Canberra				MAFL		1995–2001, 2015–2016	0	–	Folded after 2001 season, re-formed in 2015 but folded again after 2016 season
Wagga		Tigers	Robertson Oval, Wagga Wagga, NSW	RFL	1928	2002–2006	0	–	Returned to Riverina FL in 2007
West Canberra		Magpies	Holt Oval, Holt, ACT	–	1974	1974–1985	0	–	Merged with Belconnen in 1986, re-formed in Monaro AFL in 1987, re-merged with Belconnen in 1991

== Men's grand finals ==
=== First Grade ===
Season	Premiers	Score	Runners-up	Venue	Date
Federal Territory Australian Rules Football League
1924	Acton	10.7 (67) – 6.6 (42)	Canberra		
1925	Federals	7.10 (52) – 3.6 (24)	Acton		
1926	Federals (2)	8.8 (56) – 4.12 (36)	Acton		
Canberra Australian National Football League
1927	Acton (2)	12.13 (85) – 7.9 (51)	Eastlake		
1928	Eastlake	9.16 (70) – 4.6 (30)	Ainslie		
1929	Ainslie	7.13 (55) – 6.11 (47)	Eastlake		
1930	Eastlake (2)	14.16 (100) – 7.7 (49)	Ainslie		
1931	Manuka	10.6 (66) – 6.11 (47)	Acton		
1932	Goulburn	7.18 (60) – 5.6 (36)	Manuka		
1933	Eastlake (3)	13.10 (88) – 10.6 (66)	Manuka		
1934	Eastlake (4)	10.14 (74) – 4.7 (31)	Manuka		
1935	Manuka (2)	9.14 (68) – 4.19 (43)	Ainslie		
1936	Ainslie (2)	11.11 (77) – 10.7 (67)	Acton		
1937	Eastlake (5)	11.6 (72) – 7.8 (50)	Manuka		
1938	Manuka (3)	18.9 (117) – 15.4 (94)	Queanbeyan		
1939	Queanbeyan	7.10 (52) – 7.10 (52)	Manuka		
1939	Queanbeyan	18.22 (130) – 9.19 (73)	Manuka		
1940	Queanbeyan (2)	16.26 (122) – 4.5 (29)	Eastlake		
1941	Queanbeyan (3)	13.13 (91) – 13.10 (88)	Royal Australian Air Force		
1942	Eastlake-Manuka	13.24 (102) – 4.14 (38)	Royal Australian Air Force		
1943	Royal Military College	16.10 (106) – 10.14 (74)	Royal Australian Air Force		
1944	Navy	14.16 (100) – 9.19 (73)	Royal Military College		
1945	Eastlake (6)	9.16 (70) – 10.9 (69)	Navy		
1946	Ainslie (3)	12.19 (91) – 8.6 (54)	Eastlake		
1947	Ainslie (4)	15.9 (99) – 9.17 (71)	Eastlake		
1948	Eastlake (7)	22.16 (148) – 10.8 (68)	Manuka		
1949	Manuka (4)	6.9 (45) – 5.11 (41)	Eastlake		
1950	Manuka (5)	9.13 (67) – 6.6 (42)	Eastlake		
1951	Royal Military College (2)	14.14 (98) – 12.11 (83)	Manuka		
1952	Ainslie (5)	13.20 (98) – 12.12 (84)	Queanbeyan-Acton		
1953	Queanbeyan-Acton	9.12 (66) – 8.13 (61)	Ainslie		
1954	Queanbeyan-Acton (2)	23.15 (153) – 6.8 (44)	Eastlake		
1955	Manuka (6)	12.11 (83) – 8.6 (54)	Queanbeyan-Acton		
1956	Queanbeyan-Acton (3)	12.20 (92) – 5.11 (41)	Manuka		
1957	Eastlake (8)	15.10 (100) – 12.13 (85)	Manuka		
1958	Ainslie (6)	20.12 (132) – 9.7 (61)	Eastlake		
1959	Ainslie (7)	11.12 (78) – 8.8 (56)	Eastlake		
1960	Eastlake (9)	20.15 (135) – 9.9 (63)	Ainslie		
1961	Ainslie (8)	9.12 (66) – 9.4 (58)	Queanbeyan		
1962	Eastlake (10)	4.9 (33) – 2.6 (18)	Ainslie		
1963	Eastlake (11)	11.15 (81) – 6.14 (50)	Manuka		
1964	Eastlake (12)	14.11 (95) – 10.9 (69)	Manuka		
1965	Eastlake (13)	20.16 (136) – 8.14 (62)	Manuka		
1966	Eastlake (14)	13.16 (94) – 8.17 (65)	Ainslie		
1967	Manuka (7)	11.15 (81) – 6.13 (49)	Eastlake		
1968	Manuka (8)	9.16 (70) – 10.9 (69)	Eastlake		
1969	Manuka (9)	11.13 (79) – 9.5 (59)	Eastlake		
1970	Ainslie (9)	12.27 (99) – 13.15 (93)	Manuka		
1971	Manuka (10)	10.17 (77) – 6.15 (51)	Eastlake		
1972	Eastlake (15)	26.19 (175) – 9.8 (62)	Ainslie		
1973	Manuka (11)	14.14 (98) – 15.7 (97)	Ainslie		
1974	Manuka (12)	14.14 (98) – 9.13 (67)	Eastlake		
Australian Capital Territory Australian Football League
1975	Manuka (13)	12.13 (85) – 10.8 (68)	Ainslie		
1976	Eastlake (16)	23.19 (157) – 13.10 (88)	Manuka		
1977	Manuka (14)	16.12 (108) – 14.9 (93)	Eastlake		
1978	Eastlake (17)	19.23 (137) – 16.17 (113)	Ainslie		
1979	Ainslie (10)	17.18 (120) – 11.8 (74)	Belconnen		
1980	Ainslie (11)	21.10 (136) – 12.15 (87)	Manuka		
1981	Manuka (15)	18.18 (126) – 15.14 (104)	Ainslie		
1982	Ainslie (12)	22.19 (151) – 11.9 (75)	Eastlake		
1983	Ainslie (13)	18.13 (121) – 13.11 (89)	Eastlake		
1984	Ainslie (14)	20.14 (134) – 12.13 (85)	Eastlake		
1985	Queanbeyan (4)	23.18 (156) – 14.13 (97)	Ainslie		
1986	Tuggeranong	8.11 (59) – 8.10 (58)	Queanbeyan	Football Park Canberra	21 September 1986
1987	Ainslie (15)	21.9 (135) – 11.15 (81)	Queanbeyan		
1988	Queanbeyan (5)	14.10 (94) – 10.15 (75)	Ainslie		
1989	Queanbeyan (6)	12.15 (87) – 9.13 (67)	Manuka-Weston		
1990	Ainslie (16)	16.12 (108) – 10.21 (81)	Queanbeyan		
1991	Queanbeyan (7)	14.9 (93) – 10.9 (69)	Southern District		
1992	Ainslie (17)	9.18 (72) – 7.20 (62)	Queanbeyan		
1993	Ainslie (18)	20.17 (137) – 8.17 (65)	Southern District		
1994	Ainslie (19)	14.10 (94) – 10.14 (74)	Queanbeyan		
1995	Ainslie (20)	17.10 (112) – 14.11 (95)	Queanbeyan		
1996	Ainslie (21)	12.17 (89) – 10.9 (69)	Eastlake		
1997	Ainslie (22)	14.8 (92) – 8.10 (58)	Tuggeranong		
1998	Queanbeyan (8)	16.10 (106) – 12.18 (90)	Belconnen		
1999	Queanbeyan (9)	13.13 (91) – 10.14 (74)	Belconnen		
AFL Canberra First Grade
2000	Queanbeyan (10)	23.10 (148) – 14.11 (95)	Eastlake		
2001	Eastlake	14.10 (94) – 13.13 (91)	Belconnen		
2002	Belconnen	24.19 (163) – 14.6 (90)	Queanbeyan		
2003	Belconnen (2)	11.14 (80) – 11.8 (74)	Queanbeyan		
2004	Belconnen (3)	14.20 (104) – 8.9 (57)	Queanbeyan		
2005	Sydney	12.8 (80) – 8.15 (63)	Belconnen		
2006	Sydney (2)	10.16 (76) – 6.7 (43)	Belconnen		
2007	Sydney (3)	18.14 (122) – 14.10 (94)	Queanbeyan		
2008	Sydney (4)	11.4 (70) – 6.15 (69)	Belconnen		
2009	Belconnen (4)	11.13 (79) – 10.13 (73)	Ainslie		
2010	Ainslie (23)	13.10 (88) – 9.9 (63)	Eastlake		
North East Australian Football League Eastern Conference
2011	Ainslie (24)	19.11 (125) – 10.13 (73)	Sydney		
2012	Queanbeyan (11)	18.13 (121) – 13.13 (91)	Sydney		
2013	Sydney (5)	15.11 (101) – 6.13 (49)	Belconnen		
AFL Canberra First Grade
2015	Queanbeyan (12)	15.5 (95) – 10.11 (71)	Belconnen		
2016	Ainslie (25)	13.14 (92) – 9.9 (63)	Queanbeyan		
2017	Ainslie (26)	13.16 (94) – 7.10 (52)	Belconnen	Manuka Oval Canberra	3 September 2017
2018	Ainslie (27)	11.14 (80) – 6.10 (46)	Eastlake	Manuka Oval Canberra	9 September 2018
2019	Ainslie (28)	13.7 (85) – 3.11 (29)	Belconnen	Manuka Oval Canberra	7 September 2019
2020	Queanbeyan (13)	14.14 (98) – 6.7 (43)	Eastlake	Gungahlin Enclosed Oval Canberra	10 October 2020
2022	Queanbeyan (14)	7.12 (54) – 7.8 (50)	Belconnen	Phillip Oval Canberra	27 August 2022
2023	Belconnen (5)	10.11 (71) – 4.8 (32)	Ainslie	Phillip Oval Canberra	9 September 2023
2024	Queanbeyan (15)	11.8 (74) – 9.5 (59)	Eastlake	Phillip Oval Canberra	14 September 2024
2025	Eastlake (2)	10.14 (74) – 5.7 (37)	Queanbeyan	Phillip Oval Canberra	6 September 2025
2026	Ainslie (29)	9.12 (66) – 3.9 (27)	Eastlake	Phillip Oval Canberra	5 September 2026

==== Team performance ====
Team	Colours	Winners	Runners-up	Years won	Years runner-up
Ainslie		29	16	1929, 1936, 1946, 1947, 1952, 1958, 1959, 1961, 1970, 1979, 1980, 1982, 1983, 1984, 1987, 1990, 1992, 1993, 1994, 1995, 1996, 1997, 2010, 2011, 2016, 2017, 2018, 2019, 2026	1928, 1930, 1935, 1953, 1960, 1962, 1966, 1972, 1973, 1975, 1978, 1981, 1985, 1988, 2009, 2023
Eastlake (original)		17	19	1928, 1930, 1933, 1934, 1937, 1945, 1948, 1957, 1960, 1962, 1963, 1964, 1965, 1966, 1972, 1976, 1978	1927, 1929, 1940, 1946, 1947, 1949, 1950, 1954, 1958, 1959, 1967, 1968, 1969, 1971, 1974, 1977, 1982, 1983, 1984
Manuka		15	15	1931, 1935, 1938, 1949, 1950, 1955, 1967, 1968, 1969, 1971, 1973, 1974, 1975, 1977, 1981	1932, 1933, 1934, 1937, 1939, 1948, 1951, 1956, 1957, 1963, 1964, 1965, 1970, 1976, 1980
Queanbeyan		15	14	1939, 1940, 1941, 1985, 1988, 1989, 1991, 1998, 1999, 2000, 2012, 2015, 2020, 2022, 2024	1938, 1961, 1985, 1986, 1990, 1992, 1994, 1995, 2002, 2003, 2004, 2007, 2016, 2025
Belconnen		5	12	2002, 2003, 2004, 2009, 2023	1979, 1998, 1999, 2001, 2005, 2006, 2008, 2013, 2015, 2017, 2019, 2022
Sydney		5	2	2005, 2006, 2007, 2008, 2013	2011, 2012
Queanbeyan-Acton		3	2	1953, 1954, 1956	1952, 1955
Eastlake		2	9	2001, 2025	1991, 1993, 1996, 2000, 2010, 2018, 2020, 2024, 2026
Acton		2	4	1924, 1927	1925, 1926, 1931, 1936
Royal Military College		2	1	1943, 1951	1944
Federals		2	0	1925, 1926	
Navy		1	1	1944	1945
Tuggeranong		1	1	1986	1997
Goulburn		1	0	1932	–
Eastlake-Manuka		1	0	1942	–
Royal Australian Air Force		0	3	–	1941, 1942, 1943
Canberra (Original)		0	1	–	1924
Manuka-Weston		0	1	–	1989

=== Second Grade ===
Season	Premiers	Score	Runners-up	Venue	Date
Canberra Australian National Football League Second Grade
1947	Ainslie	13.12 (90) – 8.13 (61)	Manuka		
1948	Manuka	14.11 (95) – 9.15 (69)	Ainslie		
1949	Royal Military College	7.10 (52) – 6.4 (40)	Manuka		
1950	Manuka (2)	7.11 (53) – 6.2 (38)	Royal Military College		
1951	Acton	def	Royal Military College		
1952	Eastlake	16.6 (102) – 7.6 (48)	Ainslie		
1953	Queanbeyan-Acton	7.11 (53) – 7.10 (52)	Ainslie		
1954	Queanbeyan-Acton (2)	9.17 (71) – 4.9 (33)	Eastlake		
1955	Eastlake (2)	14.7 (91) – 8.8 (56)	Queanbeyan-Acton		
1956	Manuka (3)	14.5 (89) – 7.9 (51)	Queanbeyan-Acton		
1957	Eastlake (3)	11.10 (76) – 6.7 (43)	Manuka		
1958	Eastlake (4)	13.6 (84) – 10.15 (79)	Manuka		
1959	Manuka (4)	5.12 (42) – 6.3 (39)	Eastlake		
1960	Manuka (5)	7.7 (49) – 4.2 (26)	Eastlake		
1961	Eastlake (5)	7.3 (45) – 5.10 (40)	Manuka		
1962	Australian National University	4.11 (35) – 2.2 (14)	Manuka		
1963	Manuka (6)	4.15 (39) – 5.6 (36)	Eastlake		
1964	Manuka (7)	8.9 (57) – 7.6 (48)	Eastlake		
1965	Manuka (8)	11.13 (79) – 9.15 (69)	Turner		
1966	Eastlake (6)	12.10 (82) – 7.8 (50)	Royal Military College		
1967	Ainslie (2)	16.11 (107) – 4.11 (35)	Eastlake		
1968	Ainslie (3)	5.20 (50) – 4.8 (32)	Eastlake		
1969	Ainslie (4)	13.11 (89) – 6.7 (43)	Royal Military College		
1970	Royal Military College (2)	def	Ainslie		
1971	Royal Military College (3)	def	Ainslie		
1972	Ainslie (5)	16.17 (113) – 9.7 (61)	Manuka		
1973	Ainslie (6)	12.15 (87) – 8.11 (59)	Manuka		
1974	Manuka (9)	10.16 (76) – 8.6 (54)	Eastlake		
Australian Capital Territory Australian Football League Second Grade
1975	Ainslie (7)	11.13 (79) – 10.15 (75)	Manuka		
1976	Ainslie (8)	24.16 (160) – 13.8 (86)	Eastlake		
1977	Ainslie (9)	20.9 (129) – 12.17 (89)	Manuka		
1978	Belconnen	16.5 (101) – 11.12 (78)	Ainslie		
1979	Ainslie (10)	19.7 (121) – 14.16 (100)	Belconnen		
1980	Ainslie (11)	12.15 (87) – 7.11 (53)	Eastlake		
1981	Eastlake (7)	18.17 (125) – 16.11 (107)	Ainslie		
1982	Ainslie (12)	18.13 (121) – 6.8 (44)	Eastlake		
1983	Ainslie (13)	13.11 (89) – 10.6 (66)	Eastlake		
1984	Ainslie (14)	16.20 (116) – 9.7 (61)	Manuka		
1985	Queanbeyan	16.17 (113) – 12.8 (90)	Manuka-Weston		
1986	Royal Military College (4)	24.13 (157) – 9.4 (58)	Belconnen		
1987	Ainslie (15)	18.21 (129) – 8.16 (64)	Manuka-Weston		
1988	Manuka-Weston	9.11 (65) – 6.8 (44)	Ainslie		
1989	Queanbeyan (2)	15.14 (104) – 9.11 (65)	Ainslie		
1990	Queanbeyan (3)	14.9 (93) – 10.12 (72)	Manuka		
1991	Belconnen (2)	13.13 (91) – 11.6 (72)	Southern District		
1992	Ainslie (16)	25.15 (165) – 12.6 (78)	Queanbeyan		
1993	Southern District	21.14 (140) – 16.14 (109)	Ainslie		
1994	Southern District (2)	10.9 (69) – 10.7 (67)	Belconnen		
1995	Southern District (3)	12.15 (87) – 12.12 (84)	Belconnen		
1996	Eastlake Demons (4)	17.16 (118) – 4.8 (32)	Weston Creek		
1997	Ainslie (17)	15.11 (101) – 15.10 (100)	Eastlake Demons		
1998	Tuggeranong	16.14 (110) – 7.7 (49)	Queanbeyan		
1999	Ainslie (18)	def	Belconnen		
AFL Canberra Second Grade
2000	Weston Creek	7.12 (54) – 7.10 (52)	Belconnen		
2001	Ainslie (19)	10.12 (73) – 7.6 (48)	Queanbeyan		
2002	Eastlake Demons (5)	12.12 (84) – 7.12 (54)	Ainslie		
2003	Belconnen (3)	8.13 (61) – 8.6 (54)	Queanbeyan		
2004	Ainslie (20)	12.8 (80) – 9.11 (65)	Queanbeyan		
2005	Ainslie (21)	17.9 (111) – 7.7 (49)	Eastlake Demons		
2006	Eastlake Demons (6)	11.16 (82) – 8.12 (60)	Queanbeyan		
2007	Queanbeyan (4)	10.12 (72) – 6.10 (46)	Tuggeranong		
2008	Belconnen (4)	7.13 (55) – 8.5 (53)	Queanbeyan		
2009	Queanbeyan (5)	11.17 (83) – 8.8 (56)	Eastlake Demons		
2010	Queanbeyan (6)	16.11 (107) – 8.7 (55)	Belconnen		
AFL Canberra Highest Grade
2011	Queanbeyan (7)	12.15 (87) – 7.6 (48)	Ainslie		
2012	Ainslie (22)	15.9 (99) – 9.6 (60)	Belconnen		
2013	Ainslie (23)	10.20 (80) – 7.10 (52)	Belconnen		
2014	Queanbeyan (8)	10.7 (67) – 7.7 (49)	Ainslie		
AFL Canberra Second Grade
2015	Tuggeranong (2)	12.5 (77) – 6.3 (39)	Belconnen		
2016	Ainslie (24)	10.14 (74) – 8.7 (55)	Belconnen		
2017	Ainslie (25)	13.10 (88) – 7.5 (47)	Queanbeyan	Manuka Oval Canberra	3 September 2017
2018	Ainslie (26)	10.4 (64) – 4.5 (29)	Queanbeyan	Manuka Oval Canberra	9 September 2018
2019	Eastlake Demons (7)	5.3 (33) – 4.6 (30)	Belconnen	Manuka Oval Canberra	7 September 2019
2020	Belconnen (5)	4.4 (28) – 3.5 (23)	Ainslie	Gungahlin Enclosed Oval Canberra	10 October 2020
2022	Belconnen (6)	8.6 (54) – 2.8 (20)	Ainslie	Phillip Oval Canberra	27 August 2022
2023	Ainslie (27)	4.8 (32) – 3.2 (20)	Belconnen	Phillip Oval Canberra	9 September 2023
2024	Eastlake Demons (8)	9.8 (62) – 1.3 (9)	Ainslie	Phillip Oval Canberra	14 September 2024
2025	Eastlake Demons (9)	7.11 (53) – 5.5 (35)	Ainslie	Phillip Oval Canberra	6 September 2025
2026	Eastlake Demons (10)	6.9 (45) – 2.4 (16)	Belconnen	Phillip Oval Canberra	5 September 2026

==== Team performance ====
Team	Winners	Runners-up	Years won	Years runner-up
Ainslie	27	15	1947, 1967, 1968, 1969, 1972, 1973, 1975, 1976, 1977, 1979, 1980, 1982, 1983, 1984, 1987, 1992, 1997, 1999, 2001, 2004, 2005, 2012, 2013, 2016, 2017, 2018, 2023	1948, 1952, 1953, 1970, 1971, 1978, 1981, 1988, 1989, 1993, 2002, 2011, 2014, 2020, 2022
Eastlake	10	4	1993, 1994, 1995, 1996, 2002, 2006, 2019, 2024, 2025, 2026	1991, 1997, 2005, 2009
Manuka	9	12	1948, 1950, 1956, 1959, 1960, 1963, 1964, 1965, 1974	1947, 1949, 1957, 1958, 1961, 1962, 1972, 1973, 1975, 1977, 1984, 1990
Queanbeyan	8	9	1985, 1989, 1990, 2007, 2009, 2010, 2011, 2014	1992, 1998, 2001, 2003, 2004, 2006, 2008, 2017, 2018
Eastlake (original)	7	12	1952, 1955, 1957, 1958, 1961, 1966, 1981	1954, 1959, 1960, 1963, 1964, 1967, 1968, 1974, 1976, 1980, 1982, 1983
Belconnen	6	14	1978, 1991, 2003, 2008, 2020, 2022	1979, 1986, 1994, 1995, 1999, 2000, 2010, 2012, 2013, 2015, 2016, 2019, 2023, 2026
Royal Military College	4	4	1949, 1970, 1971, 1986	1950, 1951, 1966, 1969
Queanbeyan-Acton	2	2	1953, 1954	1955, 1956
Tuggeranong	2	1	1998, 2015	2007
Manuka-Weston	1	2	1988	1985, 1987
Weston Creek	1	1	2000	1996
Acton	1	0	1951	–
Australian National University	1	0	1962	–
Turner	0	1	–	1965

=== Third Grade ===
Season	Premiers	Score	Runners-up	Venue	Date
Australian Capital Territory Australian Football League Third Grade
1995	Kingston	18.21 (129) – 5.4 (34)	University of Canberra		
1996	Australian National University	8.9 (57) – 3.11 (29)	Kingston		
1997	Kingston (2)	15.13 (103) – 8.8 (56)	Gungahlin		
1998	Kingston (3)	def	Australian Defence Force Academy		
1999	Australian Defence Force Academy	def	Kingston		
AFL Canberra Third Grade
2000	Kingston (4)	def	Australian Defence Force Academy		
2001	Belconnen	def	Australian National University		
2002	Australian Defence Force Academy (2)	def	Belconnen		
2003	Australian Defence Force Academy (3)	def	Gungahlin		
2004	Australian National University (2)	def	Belconnen		
2005	Australian National University (3)	def	Belconnen		
2006	Gungahlin	def	Australian National University		
2007	Gungahlin (2)	def	Australian National University		
2008	Gungahlin (3)	def	Belconnen		
2009	Australian National University (4)	def	Harman		
2010	Belconnen (2)	11.12 (78) – 11.10 (76)	Australian Defence Force Academy		
AFL Canberra Second Highest Grade
2011	Harman	11.8 (74) – 6.10 (46)	Australian Defence Force Academy		
2012	Australian Defence Force Academy (4)	23.14 (152) – 8.2 (50)	Australian National University		
2013	Australian Defence Force Academy (5)	11.8 (74) – 9.13 (67)	Australian National University		
2014	Ainslie	6.8 (44) – 5.12 (42)	Molonglo		
AFL Canberra Third Grade
2015	Woden	8.9 (57) – 6.8 (44)	Australian National University		
2016	Woden (2)	11.9 (75) – 9.8 (62)	Australian National University		
2017	Australian Defence Force Academy (6)	7.16 (58) – 6.5 (41)	Woden	Greenway Oval, Greenway	2 September 2017
2018	Batemans Bay	9.10 (64) – 5.8 (38)	Molonglo	Phillip Oval, Phillip	22 September 2018
2019	Australian Defence Force Academy (7)	7.9 (51) – 5.5 (35)	Australian National University	Phillip Oval, Phillip	31 August 2019
2020	Australian National University (5)	6.11 (47) – 5.7 (37)	Woden	Allinsure Park, Queanbeyan	3 October 2020
2022	Australian National University (6)	13.9 (87) – 4.3 (27)	Googong	Phillip Oval, Phillip	20 August 2022
2023	Batemans Bay (2)	11.6 (72) – 3.11 (29)	Australian National University	Phillip Oval, Phillip	2 September 2023
2024	Woden (3)	6.9 (33) – 4.4 (28)	Batemans Bay	Phillip Oval, Phillip	7 September 2024
2025	Woden (4)	13.7 (85) – 9.4 (58)	Batemans Bay	Phillip Oval, Phillip	23 August 2025

==== Team performance ====
Team	Winners	Runners-up	Years won	Years runner-up
Australian Defence Force Academy	7	4	1999, 2002, 2003, 2012, 2013, 2017, 2019	1998, 2000, 2010, 2011
Australian National University	6	9	1996, 2004, 2005, 2009, 2020, 2022	2001, 2006, 2007, 2012, 2013, 2015, 2016, 2019, 2023
Kingston	4	2	1995, 1997, 1998, 2000	1996, 1999
Woden	4	2	2015, 2016, 2024, 2025	2017, 2020
Gungahlin	3	2	2006, 2007, 2008	1997, 2003
Belconnen	2	4	2001, 2010	2002, 2004, 2005, 2008
Googong/Harman	1	2	2011	2009, 2022
Batemans Bay	2	2	2018, 2023	2024, 2025
Ainslie	1	0	2014	–
Molonglo	0	2	–	2014, 2018
University of Canberra	0	1	–	1995

=== Fourth Grade ===
Season	Premiers	Score	Runners-up	Venue	Date
Australian Capital Territory Australian Football League Fourth Grade
1995	Belconnen	10.7 (67) – 4.8 (32)	Kingston		
1996	Kingston	16.14 (110) – 7.5 (47)	Tuggeranong		
1997	Belconnen (2)	def	Kingston		
1998	Australian Defence Force Academy	def	Kingston		
1999	Tuggeranong	def	Australian National University		
AFL Canberra Fourth Grade
2000	Tuggeranong (2)	def	Australian Defence Force Academy		
2001	Woden	def	Murrumbidgee		
2002	Woden (2)	def	Gungahlin		
2003	Woden (3)	def	Murrumbidgee		
2004	Goulburn	def	Belconnen		
2005	Murrumbidgee	def	Australian National University		
2006	Belconnen (3)	def	Cootamundra		
2007	Australian National University	def	Gungahlin		
2008	Yass	def	Gungahlin		
2009	Goulburn (2)	def	Gungahlin		
2010	Australian National University (2)	12.13 (85) – 13.6 (84)	Goulburn		
AFL Canberra Third Highest Grade
2011	Tuggeranong (3)	14.6 (90) – 2.7 (19)	Australian National University		
2012	Australian National University (3)	9.13 (67) – 10.5 (65)	Belconnen		
2013	Australian National University (4)	17.25 (127) – 9.8 (62)	Yass		
2014	Cootamundra	18.5 (113) – 11.7 (73)	Yass		
AFL Canberra Fourth Grade
2015	Harman	10.6 (66) – 5.15 (45)	Australian National University		
2016	Australian National University (5)	10.7 (67) – 6.10 (46)	Yass		
2017	Yass (2)	6.17 (53) – 7.4 (46)	Cootamundra	Greenway Oval, Greenway	2 September 2017
2018	Southern Cats	16.7 (103) – 3.5 (23)	Yass	Phillip Oval, Phillip	22 September 2018
2019	Australian Defence Force Academy (2)	10.9 (69) – 5.5 (35)	Woden	Phillip Oval, Phillip	31 August 2019
2020	Australian National University (6)	6.17 (53) – 7.6 (48)	Yass	Allinsure Park, Queanbeyan	3 October 2020
2022	Murrumbateman	7.5 (47) – 4.3 (27)	Yass	Phillip Oval, Phillip	20 August 2022
2023	Australian National University (7)	8.12 (60) – 8.4 (52)	Woden	Phillip Oval, Phillip	2 September 2023
2024	Eastlake	10.4 (64) – 8.6 (54)	Yass	Phillip Oval, Phillip	7 September 2024
2025	Molonglo (2)	11.10 (76) – 9.5 (59)	Murrumbateman	Phillip Oval, Phillip	23 August 2025

==== Team performance ====
Team	Winners	Runners-up	Years won	Years runner-up
Australian National University	7	3	2007, 2010, 2012, 2013, 2016, 2020, 2023	2005, 2011, 2015
Belconnen	3	2	1995, 1997, 2006	2004, 2012
Woden	3	2	2001, 2002, 2003	2019, 2023
Tuggeranong	3	1	1999, 2000, 2011	1996
Yass	2	6	2008, 2017	2013, 2014, 2017, 2018, 2020, 2022
Goulburn	2	1	2004, 2009	2010
Australian Defence Force Academy	2	1	1998, 2019	2000
Kingston	1	3	1996	1995, 1997, 1998
Murrumbidgee/Molonglo	2	2	2005, 2025	2001, 2003
Cootamundra	1	2	2014	2006, 2017
Googong	1	0	2015	–
Southern Cats	1	0	2018	–
Murrumbateman	1	1	2022	2025
Eastlake	1	0	2024	–
Gungahlin	0	4	–	2002, 2007, 2008, 2009

=== Regional League ===
Season	Premiers	Score	Runners-up	Venue	Date
AFL Canberra Regional League
2015	Goulburn	17.7 (109) – 4.10 (34)	Cootamundra		
2019	Belconnen	6.10 (46) – 4.14 (38)	Cootamundra	Allinsure Park, Queanbeyan	31 August 2019

==== Team performance ====
Team	Winners	Runners-up	Years won	Years runner-up
Goulburn	1	0	2015	–
Belconnen	1	0	2019	–
Cootamundra	0	2	–	2015, 2019

=== Under 18s ===
Season	Premiers	Score	Runners-up	Venue	Date
Canberra Australian National Football League Under 19s
1963	Turner	9.4 (58) – 7.12 (54)	Eastlake		
1964	Eastlake	def	Manuka		
1965	Eastlake (2)	def	Ainslie		
1966	Manuka	def	Turner		
1967	Manuka (2)	11.16 (82) – 7.11 (53)	Ainslie		
1968	Manuka (3)	7.13 (55) – 5.8 (38)	Ainslie		
1969	Manuka (4)	15.10 (100) – 6.10 (46)	Ainslie		
1970	Manuka (5)	14.10 (94) – 10.13 (73)	Ainslie		
1971	Eastlake (3)	def	Manuka		
1972	Manuka (6)	def	Eastlake		
1973	Manuka (7)	def	Eastlake		
1974	Belconnen	def	Eastlake		
Australian Capital Territory Australian Football League Under 19s
1975	Manuka (8)	19.17 (131) – 3.4 (22)	Eastlake		
1976	Manuka (9)	11.10 (76) – 7.8 (50)	Ainslie		
1977	Ainslie	16.19 (115) – 8.6 (54)	Manuka		
1978	Ainslie (2)	18.6 (114) – 15.10 (100)	Eastlake		
1979	Manuka (10)	14.15 (99) – 14.9 (93)	Eastlake		
1980	Eastlake (4)	15.5 (105) – 7.11 (53)	Ainslie		
1981	Weston Creek	16.12 (108) – 12.11 (83)	Manuka		
1982	Ainslie (3)	20.8 (128) – 12.11 (83)	Manuka		
1983	Ainslie (4)	16.12 (108) – 12.6 (78)	Manuka		
1984	Queanbeyan	13.14 (92) – 12.10 (82)	Manuka		
1985	Manuka-Weston	16.19 (115) – 11.8 (74)	Belconnen		
1986	Manuka-Weston (2)	24.18 (162) – 7.8 (50)	Belconnen		
1987	Eastlake (5)	12.7 (79) – 10.14 (74)	Manuka-Weston		
1988	Eastlake (6)	11.14 (80) – 5.4 (34)	Ainslie		
1989	Belconnen (2)	11.14 (80) – 7.9 (51)	Eastlake		
1990	Manuka-Weston (3)	11.10 (76) – 10.9 (69)	Ainslie		
1991	Ainslie (5)	14.12 (96) – 8.10 (58)	Belconnen		
1992	Belconnen (3)	14.14 (98) – 6.9 (45)	Tuggeranong		
1993	Belconnen (4)	15.11 (101) – 5.5 (35)	Weston Creek		
1994	Tuggeranong	15.17 (107) – 6.6 (42)	Ainslie		
1995	Tuggeranong (2)	9.6 (60) – 4.4 (28)	Belconnen		
1996	Tuggeranong (3)	14.9 (93) – 3.5 (23)	Belconnen		
Australian Capital Territory Australian Football League Under 21s
1997	Tuggeranong (4)	14.8 (92) – 10.13 (73)	Queanbeyan		
AFL Canberra Under 18s
2000	Tuggeranong Bulldogs	def	Marist College		
2001	Marist College	def	Belconnen		
2002	Queanbeyan (2)	12.4 (76) – 5.9 (39)	Tuggeranong		
2003	Marist College (2)	4.6 (30) – 2.11 (23)	Tuggeranong		
2004	Marist College (3)	def	Queanbeyan		
2005	Wagga	12.18 (90) – 6.4 (40)	Marist College		
2006	Wagga (2)	def	Tuggeranong		
2007	Tuggeranong (5)	16.6 (106) – 10.8 (68)	Queanbeyan		
2008	Marist College (4)	def	Ainslie		
2009	Marist College (5)	def	Belconnen		
2010	Marist College (6)	9.7 (61) – 6.14 (50)	Belconnen		
2011	Belconnen (5)	8.11 (59) – 7.6 (48)	Marist College		
2012	Belconnen (6)	9.5 (59) – 6.5 (41)	Eastlake Demons		
AFL Canberra Rising Stars
2013	Ainslie (6)	10.15 (75) – 10.7 (67)	Queanbeyan		
2014	Queanbeyan (3)	8.8 (56) – 5.8 (38)	Ainslie		
2015	Marist College (7)	11.4 (70) – 6.7 (43)	Ainslie		
2016	Ainslie (7)	9.8 (62) – 6.6 (42)	Queanbeyan		
2017	Marist College (8)	8.1 (49) – 3.18 (36)	Ainslie	Manuka Oval, Kingston	3 September 2017
2018	Ainslie (8)	8.7 (55) – 7.10 (52)	Queanbeyan	Manuka Oval, Kingston	9 September 2018
2019	Marist College (9)	7.10 (52) – 3.5 (23)	Tuggeranong	Manuka Oval, Kingston	7 September 2019
2020	Ainslie (9)	8.3 (51) – 6.3 (39)	Marist College	Gungahlin Enclosed Oval, Gungahlin	10 October 2020
2022	Ainslie (10)	8.8 (56) – 5.7 (37)	Belconnen	Phillip Oval, Phillip	27 August 2022
2023	Belconnen (7)	11.7 (73) – 8.4 (53)	Eastlake Demons	Phillip Oval, Phillip	10 September 2023
2024	Ainslie (11)	6.4 (40) – 4.4 (28)	Belconnen	Phillip Oval, Phillip	7 September 2024
2025	Ainslie (12)	7.8 (50) – 7.2 (44)	Marist College	Phillip Oval, Phillip	5 September 2025

==== Team performance ====
Team	Winners	Runners-up	Years won	Years runner-up
Ainslie	12	14	1977, 1978, 1982, 1983, 1991, 2013, 2016, 2018, 2020, 2022, 2024, 2025	1965, 1967, 1968, 1969, 1970, 1976, 1980, 1988, 1990, 1994, 2008, 2014, 2015, 2017
Manuka	10	7	1966, 1967, 1968, 1969, 1970, 1972, 1973, 1975, 1976, 1979	1964, 1971, 1977, 1981, 1982, 1983, 1984
Marist College	9	5	2001, 2003, 2004, 2008, 2009, 2010, 2015, 2017, 2019	2000, 2005, 2011, 2020, 2025
Belconnen	7	10	1974, 1989, 1992, 1993, 2011, 2012, 2023	1985, 1986, 1991, 1995, 1996, 2001, 2009, 2010, 2022, 2024
Eastlake	6	9	1964, 1965, 1971, 1980, 1987, 1988	1963, 1972, 1973, 1974, 1975, 1978, 1979, 1989, 2023
Tuggeranong	5	5	1994, 1995, 1996, 1997, 2007	1992, 2002, 2003, 2006, 2019
Queanbeyan	3	6	1984, 2002, 2014	1997, 2004, 2007, 2013, 2016, 2018
Manuka-Weston	3	1	1985, 1986, 1990	1987
Wagga	2	0	2005, 2006	–
Turner	1	1	1963	1965
Weston Creek	1	1	1981	1993
Manuka-Weston	1	2	1988	1985, 1987
Tuggeranong Bulldogs	1	0	2000	–
Eastlake Demons	0	1	–	2012

== Women's Grand Finals ==
=== First Grade ===
Season	Premiers	Score	Runners-up	Venue	Date
AFL Canberra Women's
1998	Australian Defence Force Academy	11.5 (71) – 5.5 (35)	Harman		
1999	Belconnen	3.8 (26) – 1.4 (10)	Tuggeranong		
2000	Australian Defence Force Academy (2)	9.7 (61) – 3.4 (22)	Tuggeranong		
2001	Ainslie	7.8 (50) – 1.1 (7)	Tuggeranong		
2002	Eastlake Demons	5.6 (36) – 1.3 (9)	Tuggeranong		
2003	Eastlake Demons (2)	9.5 (59) – 1.3 (9)	Australian National University		
2004	Tuggeranong	7.5 (47) – 3.7 (25)	Eastlake Demons		
2005	Eastlake Demons (3)	5.8 (38) – 3.2 (20)	Riverina Lions		
2006	Eastlake Demons (4)	8.11 (59) – 3.3 (21)	Tuggeranong		
2007	Tuggeranong (2)	4.4 (28) – 4.3 (27)	Eastlake Demons		
AFL Canberra Women's Division 1
2008	Eastlake Demons (5)	6.5 (41) – 2.4 (16)	Ainslie		
AFL Canberra Women's
2009	Tuggeranong (3)	2.3 (15) – 2.2 (14)	Ainslie		
2010	Tuggeranong (4)	6.11 (47) – 5.4 (34)	Ainslie		
2011	Eastlake Demons (6)	4.5 (29) – 1.3 (9)	Riverina Lions		
2012	Eastlake Demons (7)	4.9 (33) – 2.3 (15)	Riverina Lions		
AFL Canberra Women's Division 1
2013	Tuggeranong (5)	6.7 (43) – 4.3 (27)	Eastlake Demons		
2014	Tuggeranong (6)	6.5 (41) – 4.2 (26)	Riverina Lions		
2015	Eastlake Demons (8)	6.11 (47) – 5.2 (32)	Riverina Lions		
2016	Gungahlin	7.7 (49) – 4.4 (28)	Eastlake Demons		
AFL Canberra Women's
2017	Queanbeyan	6.3 (39) – 3.6 (24)	Gungahlin	Greenway Oval, Greenway	2 September 2017
AFL Canberra Women's First Grade
2018	Eastlake Demons (9)	6.7 (43) – 5.1 (31)	Queanbeyan	Manuka Oval, Kingston	9 September 2018
2019	Queanbeyan (2)	8.7 (55) – 1.1 (7)	Belconnen	Manuka Oval, Kingston	7 September 2019
2020	Belconnen (2)	6.5 (41) – 5.1 (31)	Queanbeyan	Gungahlin Enclosed Oval, Gungahlin	10 October 2020
2022	Queanbeyan (3)	6.4 (40) – 5.5 (35)	Ainslie	Phillip Oval, Phillip	27 August 2022
2023	Ainslie (2)	10.11 (71) – 1.6 (12)	Belconnen	Phillip Oval, Phillip	9 September 2023
2024	Queanbeyan (4)	7.7 (49) – 2.4 (16)	Belconnen	Phillip Oval, Phillip	14 September 2024
2025	Ainslie (3)	5.7 (37) – 4.6 (30)	Belconnen	Phillip Oval, Phillip	6 September 2025

==== Team performance ====
Team	Winners	Runners-up	Years won	Years runner-up
Eastlake Demons	9	4	2002, 2003, 2005, 2006, 2008, 2011, 2012, 2015, 2018	2004, 2007, 2013, 2016
Tuggeranong	6	5	2004, 2007, 2009, 2010, 2013, 2014	1999, 2000, 2001, 2002, 2006
Queanbeyan	4	2	2017, 2019, 2022, 2024	2018, 2020
Ainslie	3	4	2001, 2023, 2025	2008, 2009, 2010, 2022
Australian Defence Force Academy	2	1	1998, 2000	–
Belconnen	2	4	1999, 2020	2019, 2023, 2024, 2025
Gungahlin	1	1	2016	2017
Riverina Lions	0	5	–	2005, 2011, 2012, 2014, 2015
Googong/Harman	0	1	–	1998
Australian National University	0	1	–	2003

=== Second Grade ===
Season	Premiers	Score	Runners-up	Venue	Date
2023	Ainslie	2.4 (16) – 1.1 (7)	Eastlake Demons	Phillip Oval, Phillip	9 September 2023
2024	Queanbeyan	8.9 (57) – 3.2 (20)	Ainslie	Phillip Oval, Phillip	14 September 2024
2025	Queanbeyan (2)	4.6 (30) – 1.0 (6)	Belconnen	Phillip Oval, Phillip	6 September 2025

==== Team performance ====
Team	Winners	Runners-up	Years won	Years runner-up
Queanbeyan	2	0	2024, 2025	–
Ainslie	1	1	2023	2024
Belconnen	0	1	–	2025
Eastlake Demons	0	1	–	2023

=== Community League ===
Season	Premiers	Score	Runners-up	Venue	Date
AFL Canberra Women's Division 2
2008	Belconnen	6.8 (44) – 1.2 (8)	Gungahlin		
2013	Queanbeyan	5.14 (44) – 5.4 (34)	Australian National University		
2014	Queanbeyan (2)	7.11 (53) – 2.3 (15)	Molonglo		
2015	Queanbeyan (3)	4.3 (27) – 2.5 (17)	Molonglo		
2016	Molonglo	8.12 (60) – 4.6 (30)	Riverina Lions		
AFL Canberra Women's Second Grade
2018	Riverina Lions	3.9 (27) – 3.4 (22)	Australian National University	Phillip Oval, Phillip	22 September 2018
AFL Canberra Women's Community League
2019	Australian National University	6.8 (44) – 1.2 (8)	Batemans Bay	Phillip Oval, Phillip	31 August 2019
2020	Molonglo (2)	1.3 (9) – 1.2 (8)	Queanbeyan	Allinsure Park, Queanbeyan	3 October 2020
2022	Australian National University (2)	5.4 (34) – 2.3 (15)	Molonglo	Phillip Oval, Phillip	20 August 2022
2023	Googong (1)	6.5 (41) – 3.4 (22)	Batemans Bay	Phillip Oval, Phillip	2 September 2023
2024	Australian National University (3)	5.3 (33) – 2.3 (15)	Batemans Bay	Phillip Oval, Phillip	14 September 2024
2025	Googong (2)	7.9 (51) – 1.3 (9)	Batemans Bay	Phillip Oval, Phillip	23 August 2025

==== Team performance ====
Team	Winners	Runners-up	Years won	Years runner-up
Queanbeyan	3	1	2013, 2014, 2015	2020
Molonglo	2	3	2016, 2020	2014, 2015, 2022
Australian National University	3	2	2019, 2022, 2024	2013, 2018
Belconnen	1	0	2008	–
Riverina Lions	1	1	2018	2016
Googong	2	0	2023, 2025	–
Batemans Bay	0	4	–	2019, 2023, 2024, 2025
Gungahlin	0	1	–	2008

=== Regional League ===
Season	Premiers	Score	Runners-up	Venue	Date
AFL Canberra Women's Regional League
2019	Riverina Lions	3.3 (21) – 2.4 (16)	Queanbeyan	Allinsure Park, Queanbeyan	31 August 2019

==== Team performance ====
Team	Winners	Runners-up	Years won	Years runner-up
Riverina Lions	1	0	2019	–
Queanbeyan	0	1	–	2019

=== Under 18s ===
Season	Premiers	Score	Runners-up	Venue	Date
AFL Canberra Women's Rising Stars
2018	Queanbeyan	5.9 (39) – 5.3 (33)	Belconnen	Phillip Oval, Phillip	16 September 2018
2019	Ainslie	6.6 (42) – 1.3 (9)	Queanbeyan	Phillip Oval, Phillip	15 September 2019
2020	Ainslie (2)	7.9 (51) – 2.2 (14)	Belconnen	Allinsure Park, Queanbeyan	27 September 2020
2023	Ainslie (3)	10.12 (72) – 2.1 (13)	Belconnen	Phillip Oval, Phillip	10 September 2023
2024	Ainslie (4)	6.14 (50) – 2.0 (12)	Tuggeranong Valley	Phillip Oval, Phillip	13 September 2023
2025	Belconnen	7.4 (46) – 4.6 (30)	Queanbeyan	Phillip Oval, Phillip	5 September 2025

==== Team performance ====
Team	Winners	Runners-up	Years won	Years runner-up
Ainslie	4	0	2019, 2020, 2023, 2024	–
Belconnen	1	3	2025	2018, 2020, 2023
Queanbeyan	1	2	2018	2019, 2025
Tuggeranong Valley	0	1	–	2024

== See also ==
- Mulrooney Medal
- List of Australian rules football leagues in Australia
