= Syd McGain =

Australian rules footballer

Personal information
- Full name: Sydney John McGain
- Born: 5 February 1917; Fitzroy North, Victoria
- Died: 23 November 2008 (aged 91); Strathmore, Victoria
- Original team: Mathoura
- Height: 174 cm (5 ft 9 in)
- Weight: 73 kg (161 lb)

Playing career^{1}
Years	Club	Games (Goals)
1938	Essendon	1 (1)
1940–1943	Fitzroy	12 (0)
1943–1945	North Melbourne	12 (0)
Total		25 (1)
- ^{1} Playing statistics correct to the end of 1945.

Sydney John McGain (5 February 1917 – 23 November 2008) was an Australian rules footballer who played with Essendon, Fitzroy and North Melbourne in the Victorian Football League (VFL).

== Football ==
McGain was born in Fitzroy North but played his early football for New South Wales club Mathoura, after moving to the state to become a horse-breaker. A wingman, McGain played for Pascoe Vale when he returned to Melbourne, then joined Essendon and made one appearances for the club in the 1938 VFL season. Due to a pay dispute, McGain left Essendon for Fitzroy. McGain played eight league games for Fitzroy in 1940, but added just four more games over the next three years. He was convinced to cross to North Melbourne during the 1943 season, after their captain Dally O'Brien offered to send a car to take him to training from his army base in Maribyrnong. At North Melbourne he played 12 senior games, six each in 1943 and 1945.

== Umpiring & Professional Running ==
From 1947 to 1949, McGain was a member of the VFL Umpires Association and officiated in various leagues across the state. Also a professional runner, he won the 1947 Maryborough Gift and reached the semi-finals of the Stawell Gift in 1948. He won the Moyhu Gift in 1951.

He was one of the founders of the Strathmore Football Club in the 1950s and acted as their first ever coach. The Syd McGain Oval in Strathmore is named in his honour, renamed from Lebanon Park in 1997.
