= David McKenzie (footballer) =

Australian rules footballer

Personal information
- Full name: David McKenzie
- Born: 1 September 1942
- Original team: Picola
- Height: 173 cm (5 ft 8 in)
- Weight: 76 kg (168 lb)

Playing career^{1}
| Years | Club | Games (Goals) |
| 1964 | Fitzroy | 2 (1) |
- ^{1} Playing statistics correct to the end of 1964.

David McKenzie (born 1 September 1942) is a former Australian rules footballer who played with Fitzroy in the Victorian Football League (VFL).

McKenzie made his debut for Picola in 1956, then went on to win nine Picola FC best and fairest awards, four Picola & District Football League best and fairest awards, called the Pearce Medal. He retired in 1978 after 406 senior games for Picola FC.

McKenzie was the league president from 1979 to 2008 and in 2003 was elected as Mayor of the Moira Council.
