= Katunga Football Club =

Katunga

Names
- Full name: Katunga Football Netball Club
- Nickname(s): Swans
- Club song: Katunga Theme Song

Club details
- Founded: 1892; 133 years ago
- Colours: red white
- Competition: Picola & District
- President: Stacey Weeks
- Coach: Damien “Gypsy” Kennedy
- Captain(s): Scott Sutton
- Ground(s): Katunga Recreation Reserve (capacity: 1,500)

Uniforms
Home

Other information
- Official website: Katunga FNC website

The Katunga Football Netball Club, nicknamed the Swans, is an Australian rules football and netball club playing in the Picola & District Football League. Katunga Football Club joined the Picola & District Football League in 1951 and has called the league its home ever since.

The club is based in the small Victorian town of Katunga. The league split into two divisions between 2009 and 2017, which placed Katunga in the South East Division. They were still able to compete against close rivals Waaia, however they could not have the traditional rival match against Strathmerton, as Strathmerton where in the North West Division between 2009 and 2017.

== Football competitions ==
Gedye's Victoria Hotel Cup

- 1892 (Runners Up to Cobram FC)

Goulburn Valley Football Association

- 1893 - 1907, 1911 - 1915, 1919

Federal District Football Association

- 1899 to ?

== Premierships ==
- Goulburn Valley Football Association
  - 1893, 1894, 1895, 1899
- Picola & District Football League
  - Seniors (1sts)
    - 1968, 1977, 1983, 1984
    Reserves (2nds)
    - 1960, 1962, 1966, 1971, 1983, 1984, 1989, 2001
    Thirds (3rds)
    - 1968, 1972, 1976, 1977, 1978, 1979, 1980, 1990, 1993, 1995, 2007, 2019
    Fourths (4ths)
    - 1971, 1978, 1984, 1989, 1990, 1991, 1992, 1993, 1994, 2005

The club's shorts varies for home and away games. Red shorts are worn at home games and white shorts are worn at away games.
