= Picola & District Football Netball League =

Australian sports league

- Current season, competition or edition: 2026
- Sport: Australian rules football Netball
- Founded: 1905; 121 years ago
- CEO: Shane Railton
- President: Brian Purtill
- Motto: "The Family League"
- No. of teams: 165: 30 (senior football); 30 (junior football); 60 (senior netball); 45 (junior netball)
- Country: Australia
- Most recent champions: Seniors: Katamatite; Reserves: Katamatite; U/17's: Berrigan; U/14's: Deniliquin Rovers; A. Grade: Dookie United; B. Grade: Tungamah; C. Grade: Tungamah; C. Reserve: Waaia; 17 Under: Deniliquin Rovers; 15 Under: Deniliquin Rovers; 13 Under: Tungamah (2026)
- Most titles: Seniors: Waaia (13); A. Grade: Katunga & Waaia (9)
- Sponsor: Bendigo Bank
- Related competitions: VFL, MFNL, GVFNL
- Website: pdfnl.com

The Picola & District Football Netball League (PDFNL) is an Australian rules football and netball league.

The league covers a large area of northern Victoria and southern New South Wales from Shepparton in the south to Jerilderie in the north, and consists of teams from the smaller communities and towns.

As of 2024, the PDFNL is the only Australian rules football league in Victoria that is not affiliated with AFL Victoria.

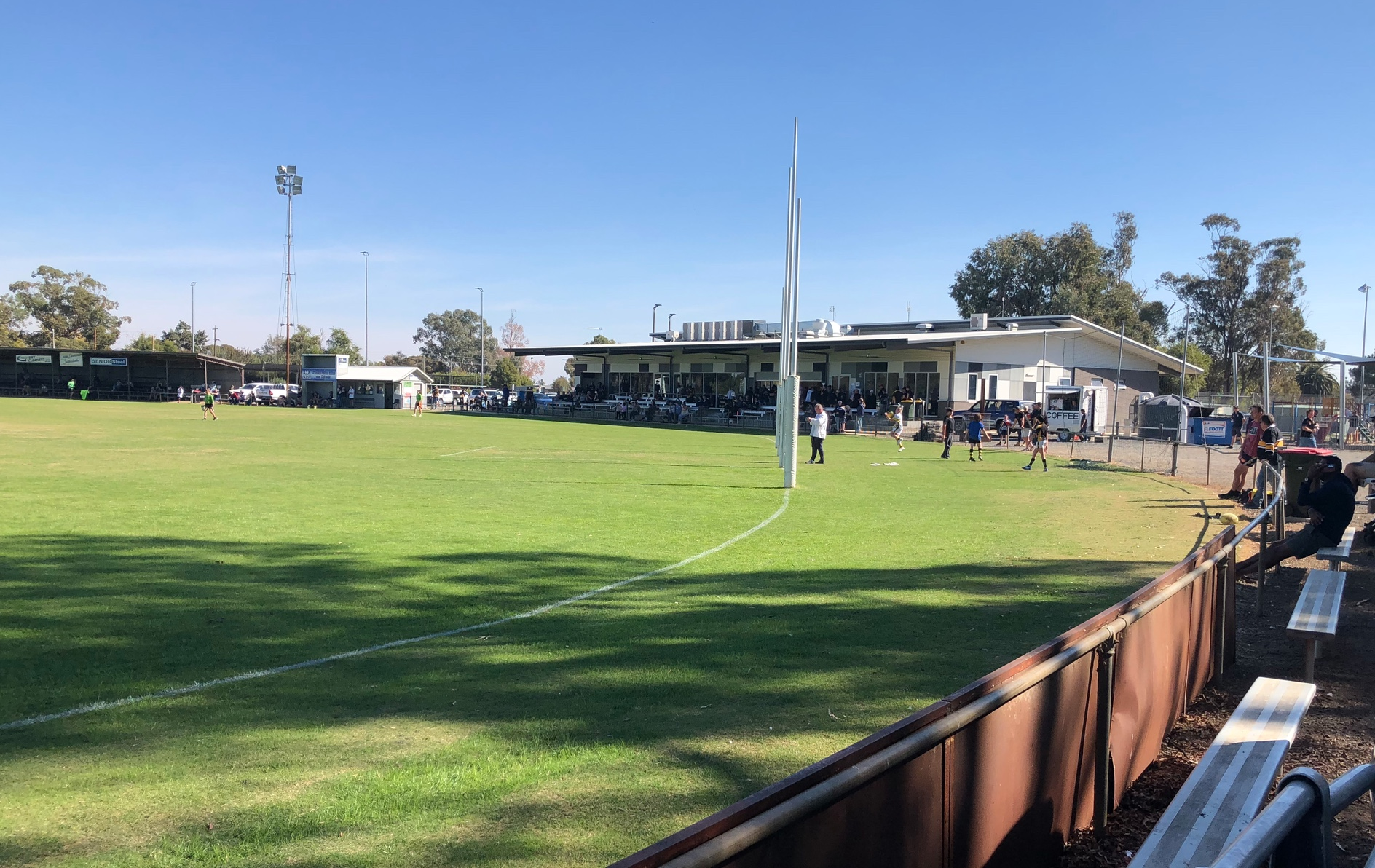
Katandra Football Netball Club Clubrooms, Victoria.

== History ==
In 1897, the Murray River District Football Association was formed from the following teams - Barmah, Kotupna, Nathalia Ramblers and Picola, with Kotupna finishing first on the ladder and claiming the premiership.

The original Picola & District Football Association was formed on Saturday 13 May 1905 at the Picola Hotel, with delegates representing the following clubs – Barmah, Koptupna, Moira, Nathalia and Picola present and was active until 1907.

At a meeting of club delegates on Tuesday, 26 May 1908 at the Federal Hall, Picola from the – Federal, Koptupna, Moira, Nathalia and Picola football clubs, it was decided to form an association called the Western and Moira Ridings Football Association and was a strong competition up until 1933.

At the 1934 annual general meeting of the Western and Moira Football Association it was decided to change the official name of the football association to the Picola & District Football Association. The founding clubs were Barmah, Kotupna, Moira, Nathalia Seconds, Picola, and Yalca North.

Former Moria footballer, Picola & DFL President and Life Member, Cyril W. Pearce was the Picola & DFL President from 1940 to 1949 and also from 1952 to 1974.

Between 1945 and 1958 Nurmukah and Nathalia both field second XVIII sides in the PDFNL.

In 1971 founding clubs Picola and Yalca North merged to form Picola United.

Former Picola and Fitzroy player and four times Picola & DFL best and fairest winner, David McKenzie was the Picola & DFL President from 1979 to 2008. The Reserves football competition best and fairest winner receives the Picola & DFNL McKenzie Medal.

Former VFL/AFL umpire, Glenn James was a former Wunghnu player, before he took up umpiring.

Dookie United and Shepparton East joined the Picola & DFNL in 2006 from the Central Goulburn Football League.

In 1992 Danny Irwin of Waaia kicked 215 goals in a season, which was bettered by Aaron Purcell in 2013 with 232 goals.

In 2006, Dookie United and Shepparton East made their debut with the league. They were previously in the now defunct Central Goulburn Football League.

In 2011, the Wunghnu FC folded after a long struggle with player numbers and off field support.

From 2021, the winner of the best on ground award in the Reserves football grand final receives the Michael Fleming Award.

Splitting the league

In the 2009 season, the Picola League split into South East and North West divisions based on the geographical location of each club. The league copped a lot of criticism by making this move but has generally been successful and has resulted in reduced travel. The exception has been Wunghnu, which inexplicably was placed in the NW division despite being surrounded by SE division clubs. Wunghnu folded less than two seasons after the split.

In 2014, Tocumwal transferred from the stronger Murray Football League after struggling to be competitive in that competition.

In 2018 the North West and South East were merged as the PDFNL was reduced to one 13 team competition as the PDFNL chose not to be affiliated with AFL Goulburn Murray as 4 clubs Tungamah, Katandra, Dookie United and Shepparton East decided split away wanting to stay affiliated with AFLGM.

In 2019 the Picola & District FNL re-affiliated with the AFL Goulburn Murray but remained as one division in a 13-team competition.

The Operations Manager of the Picola & DFNL is Shane Railton, who has been in charge since December 2016.

Following the admission of Barooga in 2026, the P&DFNL voted to split into South East and North West divisions again for the 2027 season.

== Clubs ==
=== Locations ===
Locations of the Picola & District FNL clubs

=== Current ===
==== North-West Division ====
Club	Colours	Nickname	Home Ground	Former League	Est.	Years in PDFNL	PDFNL Senior Premierships	
Club	Colours	Nickname	Home Ground	Former League	Est.	Years in PDFNL	Total	Years
Berrigan		Saints	Berrigan Recreation Reserve, Berrigan, New South Wales	MFNL	1891	2003–	1	2011
Blighty		Redeyes	Blighty Recreation Reserve, Blighty, New South Wales	CDFNL	1949	1969–	4	1969, 1971, 1975, 2000
Deniliquin Rovers		Rovers	Memorial Park, Deniliquin, New South Wales	–	1977	1977–	0	–
Jerilderie		Demons	Jerilderie Recreation Reserve, Jerilderie, New South Wales	CDFNL	1891	2008–	4	2009, 2012, 2013, 2014
Mathoura		Timbercutters	Mathoura Recreation Reserve, Mathoura, New South Wales	EFL	1909	1990–	1	1993
Picola United		Blues	Picola Recreation Reserve, Picola, Victoria	–	1971	1971-	2	2016, 2017
Rennie		Hoppers	Rennie Recreation Reserve, Rennie, New South Wales	HFNL	1932	2009–	3	2011, 2017, 2018
Tocumwal		Bloods	Tocumwal Recreation Reserve, Tocumwal, New South Wales	MFNL	1891	2014–2022, 2024–	0	–

==== South-East Division ====
Club	Colours	Nickname	Home Ground	Former League	Est.	Years in PDFNL	PDFNL Senior Premierships	
Club	Colours	Nickname	Home Ground	Former League	Est.	Years in PDFNL	Total	Years
Barooga		Hawks	Barooga Recreation Reserve, Barooga, New South Wales	MFNL	1894	1959–1988, 2026-	10	1959, 1960, 1961, 1976, 1978, 1979, 1981, 1982, 1986, 1987
Dookie United		Dooks	Dookie Recreation Reserve, Dookie	CGFL, KDFNL	1977	2006–2017, 2025–	1	2007
Katamatite		Tigers	Katamatite Recreation Reserve, Katamatite, Victoria	TFL	1891	1950–55, 1995–	5	1950, 1996, 2001, 2025, 2026
Katandra		Kats	Katandra Recreation Reserve, Katandra West, Victoria	TFL, MFNL	1911	1996–2017, 2020–	3	1998, 2003, 2004
Katunga		Swans	Katunga Recreation Reserve, Katunga, Victoria	–	1950	1950–	4	1968, 1977, 1983, 1984
Strathmerton		Bulldogs	Strathmerton Recreation Reserve, Strathmerton, Victoria	MFNL	1894	1936–1937, 1994–	6	1936, 1937, 1997, 2010, 2015, 2019
Tungamah		Bears	Tungamah Recreation Reserve, Tungamah, Victoria	TFL, MFNL	1882	1995–2017, 2020–	6	1999, 2008, 2009, 2013, 2014, 2015
Waaia		Bombers	Waaia Recreation Reserve, Waaia, Victoria	W&MRFA	1894	1935 –	13	1953, 1974, 1989, 1990, 1991, 1992, 1994, 1995, 2002, 2005, 2022, 2023, 2024

=== Former ===
Club	Colours	Nickname	Home Ground	Former League	Est.	Years in PDFNL	PDFNL Senior Premierships		Fate
Club	Colours	Nickname	Home Ground	Former League	Est.	Years in PDFNL	Total	Years	Fate
Barmah		Riversiders, Barmsiders		P&DFA	1896	1934–1948	2	1934, 1938	Folded after 1948 season
Kotupna				P&DFA	1896	1934–1935	0	–	Merged with Wyuna after 1935 season
Moira		Ramblers	Narioka Recreation Reserve, Picola	P&DFA	c.1890s	1934–1964	4	1940, 1946, 1948, 1957	Folded
Nathalia second XVIII		Purples	Nathalia Recreation Reserve, Nathalia	–	1887	1934–1958	1	1947	Joined first XVIII in Murray FNL following 1958 season
Numurkah second XVIII		Blues	Numurkah Showgrounds, Numurkah	–	1882	1946–1958	1	1951	Joined first XVIII in Murray FNL following 1958 season
Picola		Blues	Picola Recreation Reserve, Picola, Victoria	N&DFA, W&MRFA	1897	1905–1907, 1934–1970	10	1906, 1907, 1935, 1949, 1952, 1954, 1955, 1956, 1962, 1967	Played in Western & Moira Ridings FA between 1908 and 1933. Merged with Yalca North to form Picola United in 1971
Shepparton East		Eagles	Central Park Recreation Reserve, Shepparton East	CGFL	1924	2006–2017	4	2006, 2010, 2012, 2016	Moved to Murray FNL following 2017 season
Tallygaroopna		Redlegs	Tallygaroopna Recreation Reserve, Tallygaroopna	CGVFL	1904	1953–1957	0	–	Moved to Kyabram District FNL following 1957 season
Wunghnu		Magpies	Wunghnu Recreation Reserve, Wunghnu	CGVFL	1885	1951–2010	5	1958, 1964, 1965, 1966, 1973	Folded in 2011
Wyuna			Wyuna Recreation Reserve, Wyuna	KDJFA	c.1900s	1929–1931	0	–	Moved to Kyabram District FL in 1932.
Yalca North	(1934-?)(?-1972)		Yalca North Recreation Reserve, Yalca	–	1909	1934–1971	1	1939	Merged with Picola following 1971 season to form Picola United
Yarroweyah		Hoppers	Yarroweyah Recreation Reserve, Yarroweyah, Victoria	–	1955	1956–2024	6	1963, 1970, 1972, 1980, 1985, 1988	Entered recess after 2024 season

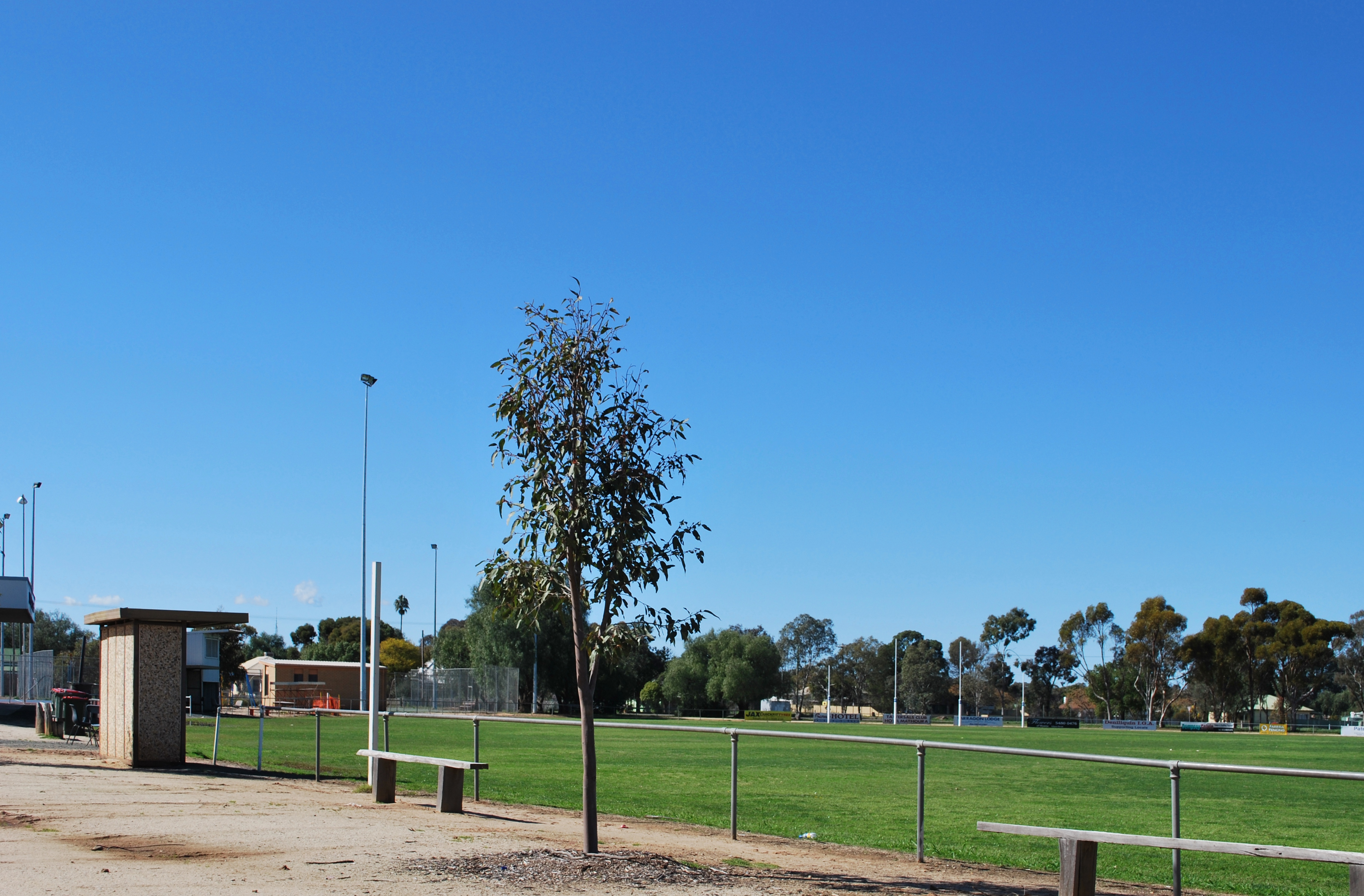
Mathoura Football Ground

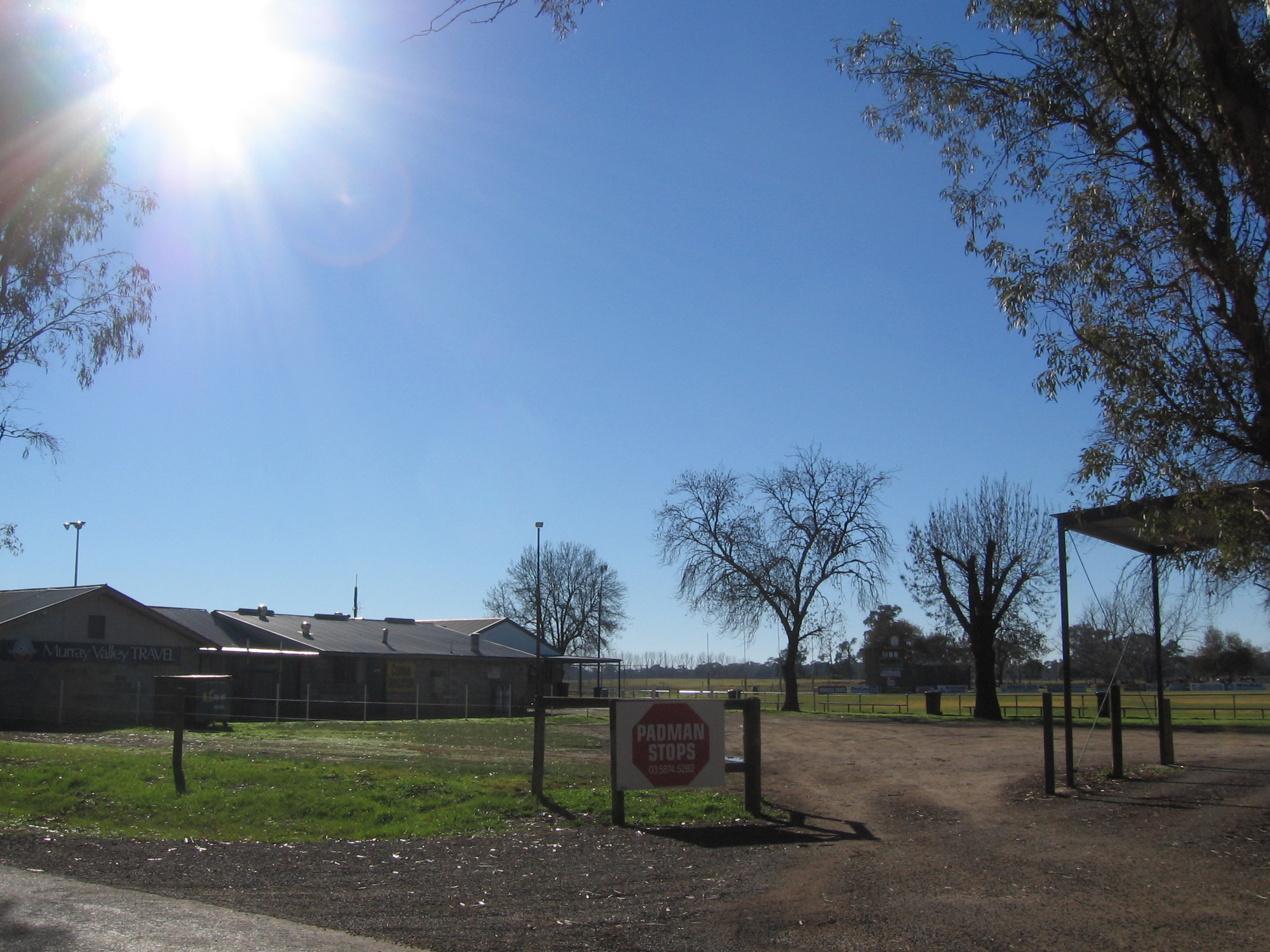
Yarroweyah Sports Oval

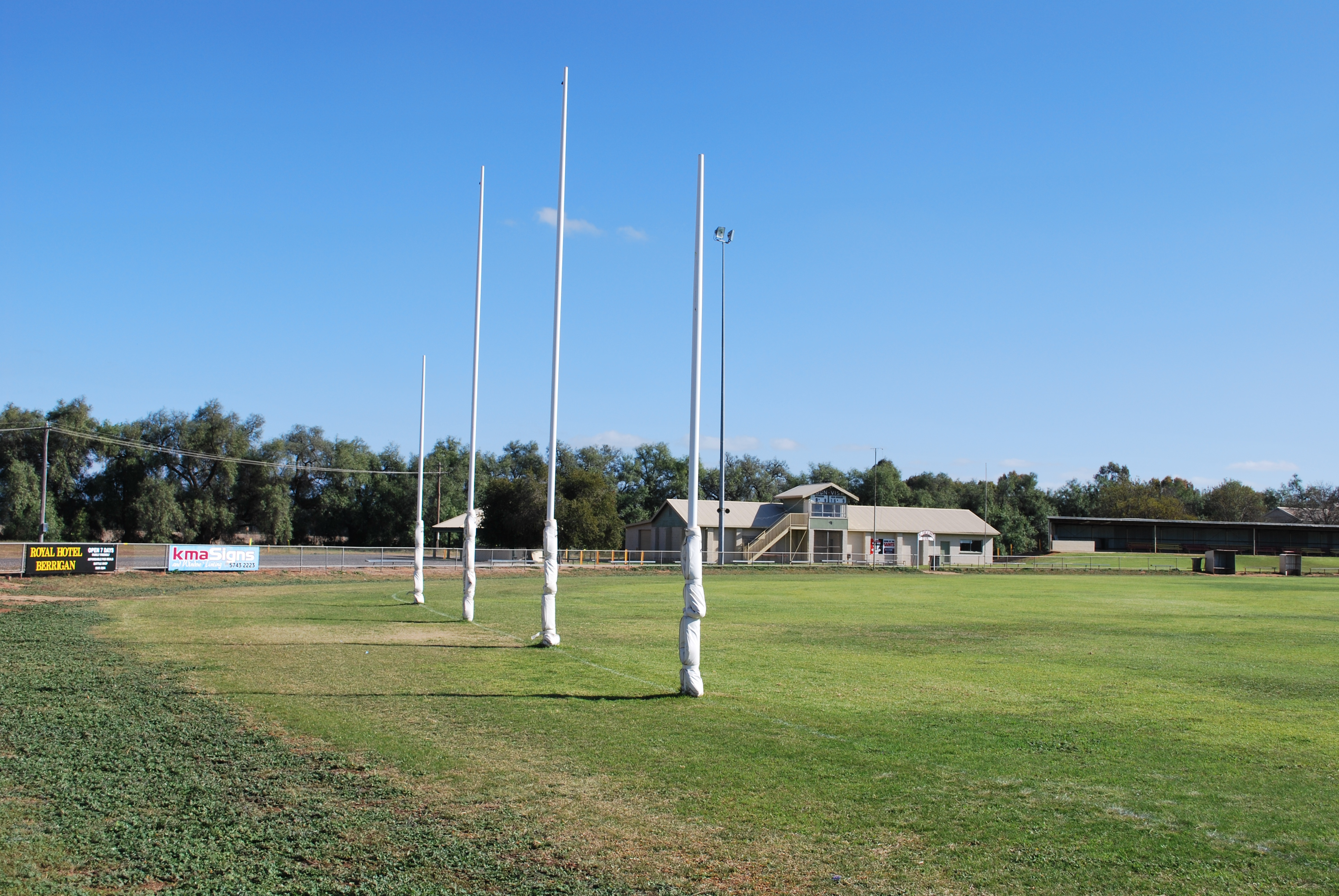
Berrigan Football Ground

== Picola & DFNL Premiers ==
Senior Football - 1934 to 2008

- 1934 - Barmah
- 1935 - Picola
- 1936 - Strathmerton
- 1937 - Strathmerton
- 1938 - Barmah
- 1939 - Yalca North
- 1940 - Moira
- 1941 - In recess > World War II
- 1942 - In recess > World War II
- 1943 - In recess > World War II
- 1944 - In recess > World War II
- 1945 - In recess > World War II
- 1946 - Moira
- 1947 - Nathalia Seconds
- 1948 - Moira
- 1949 - Picola
- 1950 - Katamatite
- 1951 - Numurkah Seconds
- 1952 - Picola
- 1953 - Waaia
- 1954 - Picola
- 1955 - Picola
- 1956 - Picola
- 1957 - Moira
- 1958 - Wunghnu
- 1959 - Barooga
- 1960 - Barooga
- 1961 - Barooga
- 1962 - Picola
- 1963 - Yarroweyah
- 1964 - Wunghnu
- 1965 - Wunghnu
- 1966 - Wunghnu
- 1967 - Picola
- 1968 - Katunga
- 1969 - Blighty
- 1970 - Yarroweyah
- 1971 - Blighty
- 1972 - Yarroweyah
- 1973 - Wunghnu
- 1974 - Waaia
- 1975 - Blighty
- 1976 - Barooga
- 1977 - Katunga
- 1978 – Barooga
- 1979 – Barooga
- 1980 – Yarroweyah
- 1981 – Barooga
- 1982 – Barooga
- 1983 – Katunga
- 1984 – Katunga
- 1985 – Yarroweyah
- 1986 – Barooga
- 1987 – Barooga
- 1988 – Yarroweyah
- 1989 – Waaia
- 1990 – Waaia
- 1991 – Waaia
- 1992 – Waaia
- 1993 – Mathoura
- 1994 – Waaia
- 1995 – Waaia
- 1996 – Katamatite
- 1997 – Strathmerton
- 1998 – Katandra
- 1999 – Tungamah
- 2000 – Blighty
- 2001 – Katamatite
- 2002 – Waaia
- 2003 – Katandra
- 2004 – Katandra
- 2005 – Waaia
- 2006 – Shepparton East
- 2007 – Dookie United
- 2008 – Tungamah

Picola & DFNL - Two Divisions - North West & South East (2009 to 2017)

- 2009
  - North West – Jerilderie
  - South East – Tungamah
- 2010
  - North West – Strathmerton
  - South East – Shepparton East
- 2011
  - North West – Berrigan
  - South East – Rennie
- 2012
  - North West – Jerilderie
  - South East – Shepparton East
- 2013
  - North West – Jerilderie
  - South East – Tungamah
- 2014
  - North West – Jerilderie
  - South East – Tungamah
- 2015
  - North West – Strathmerton
  - South East – Tungamah
- 2016
  - North West – Picola United
  - South East – Shepparton East
- 2017
  - North West – Picola United
  - South East – Rennie

Senior Football - 2018 to 2025

- 2018 – Rennie
- 2019 – Strathmerton
- 2020 - P&DFNL in recess > COVID-19
- 2021 - 1st:Strathmerton. 2nd: Waaia. (No finals series > COVID-19)
- 2022 – Waaia
- 2023 – Waaia
- 2024 – Waaia
- 2025 - Katamatite
- 2026 - Katamatite

Reserves Football

- 1962 - Katunga
- 1963 - Yarroweyah 8.8 d Katunga 3.7
- 1964 -
- 1965 - Yarroweyah 5.5 d Katunga 3.15
- 1966 - Katunga 8.9 d Yarroweyah 7.11
- 1967 - Waaia 6.9 d Yarroweyah 5.4
- 1968 - Yarroweyah 12.6 d Waaia 11.3
- 1969 -
- 1970 -
- 1971 - Katunga 11.7 d Yarroweyah 3.6
- 1972 -
- 1973 -
- 1974 -
- 1975 -
- 1976 -
- 1977 -
- 1978 -
- 1979 -
- 1980 - Barooga 7.4 d Blighty 6.6
- 1981 - Deniliquin Rovers 8.11 d Barooga 4.13
- 1982 - Barooga
- 1983 - Katunga 23.10 d Deni Rovers 7.3
- 1984 - Deniliquin Rovers 7.9 d Barooga 5.14
- 1985 - Waaia
- 1986 - Deniliquin Rovers 8.13 d Barooga 8.9
- 1987 - Barooga 14.18 d Deniliquin Rovers 6.2
- 1988 - Barooga 19.13 d Katunga 6.2
- 1989 - Katunga
- 1990 - Waaia
- 1991 - Waaia
- 1992 - Waaia
- 1993 -
- 1994 - Waaia
- 1995 -
- 1996 -
- 1997 -
- 1998 -
- 1999 -
- 2000 - Blighty 5.5 d Katunga 5.4
- 2001 - Katunga
- 2002 -
- 2003 -
- 2004 -
- 2005 -
- 2006 -
- 2007 -
- 2008 -
- 2009
  - NW: Picola United 6.7 d Deniliquin Rovers 5.6
  - SE: Tungamah 10.7 d Katandra 7.8
- 2010
  - NW: Picola United 8.5 d Mathoura 2.3
  - SE: Shepparton East 12.17 d Tungamah 5.6
- 2011
  - NW: Deniliquin Rovers 4.10 d Jerilderie 4.9
  - SE: Tungamah 10.13 d Shepparton East 9.4
- 2012
  - NW: Deniliquin Rovers 7.8 d Jerilderie 4.5
  - SE: Shepparton East 11.13 d Waaia 5.7
- 2013
  - NW: Deniliquin Rovers 12.8 d Strathmerton 10.4
  - SE: Tungamah 12.20 d Shepparton East 9.3
- 2014
  - NW: Strathmerton 16.12 d Jerilderie 6.3
  - SE: Dookie United 12.4 d Shepparton East 3.11
- 2015
  - NW: Picola United 13.10 d Jerilderie 3.9
  - SE: Shepparton East 12.7 d Dookie United 10.3
- 2016
  - NW: Picola United 9.13 d Deniliquin Rovers 6.4
  - SE: Dookie United 8.7 d Shepparton East 5.8
- 2017
  - NW: Picola United 13.8 d Strathmerton 5.9
  - SE: Waaia 12.7 v Shepparton East 11.9
- 2018 - Waaia 6.4 d Deni Rovers 5.7
- 2019 - Blighty 16.10 d Waaia 6.5
- 2020 - P&DFNL in recess > COVID-19
- 2021 - 1st: Katandra. 2nd: Tungamah.(No finals series > COVID-19)
- 2022 - Strathmerton 6.8 d Tungamah 3.9
- 2023 - Waaia 7.11 d Strathmerton 4.6
- 2024 - Tungamah 9.16 d Katandra 7.9
- 2025 - Tungamah 11.5 d Deni Rovers 7.7
- 2026 - Katamatite 9.15 d Barooga 5.5

Thirds Football

- 1968 - Katunga
- 1969 -
- 1970 -
- 1971 - Blighty 10.7 d Picola 4.5
- 1972 - Katunga
- 1973 -
- 1974 -
- 1975 -
- 1976 - Katunga
- 1977 - Katunga
- 1978 - Katunga
- 1979 - Katunga
- 1980 - Katunga
- 1981 - Deniliquin Rovers 12.10 d Katunga 2.4
- 1982 -
- 1983 - Barooga 17.17 d Katunga 12.6
- 1984 - Barooga 16.8 d Yarroweyah ?
- 1985 -
- 1986 - Barooga* 10.12 d Katunga 7.5
- 1987 - Wunghnu 8.6 d Katunga 7.8
- 1988 - Barooga 12.7 d Katunga 5.11
- 1989 -
- 1990 - Katunga
- 1991 -
- 1992 -
- 1993 - Katunga
- 1994 -
- 1995 - Katunga
- 1996 -
- 1997 -
- 1998 -
- 1999 -
- 2000 - Strathmerton 7.7 d Deni Rovers 3.1
- 2001 -
- 2002 -
- 2003 -
- 2004 -
- 2005 -
- 2006 -
- 2007 - Katunga
- 2008 -
- 2009 - NW: Deni Rovers 5.7 d Blighty 2.14
- 2009 - SE: Dookie United 7.5 d Tungamah 6.9
- 2010 - NW: Berrigan 8.11 d Blighty 1.2
- 2010 - SE: Dookie United 17.23 d Katamatite 4.1
- 2011 - NW: Jerilderie 11.7 d Berrigan 6.12
- 2011 - SE: Shepparton East 6.7 d Katunga 7.8
- 2012 - NW: Jerildrie 14.7 d Deni Rovers 7.6
- 2012 - SE: Dookie United 5.12 d Tungamah 5.6
- 2013 - NW: Strathmerton 11.9 d Jerilderie 5.5
- 2013 - SE: Tungamah 12.11 d Waaia 9.5
- 2014 - NW: Strathmerton 14.11 d Deni Rovers 3.6
- 2014 - SE: Shepp East 10.12 d Tungamah 5.12
- 2015 - NW: Deni Rovers 12.15 d Mathoura 6.1
- 2015 - SE: Shepp East 14.14 d Tungamah 1.10
- 2016 - NW: Deni Rovers 9.6 d Picola United 4.5
- 2016 - SE: Katandra 7.10 d Katunga 4.1
- 2017 - NW: Jerilderie 15.13 d Picola United 1.7
- 2017 - SE: Katandra 16.12 d Tungamah 9.9
- 2018 - Strathmerton 7.6 d Katunga 4.8
- 2019 - Katunga 7.5 d Strathmerton 4.15
- 2020 - P&DFNL in recess>COVID-19
- 2021 - 1st: Deni Rovers. 2nd: Katandra.(No finals series > COVID-19)
- 2022 - Tungamah 8.10 d Katandra 5.4
- 2023 - Deniliquin Rovers 18.16 d Katunga 1.7
- 2024 - Katandra 10.15 d Tocumwal 8.6
- 2025 - Strathmerton 13.7 d Tungamah 9.4
- 2026 - Berrigan 5.11 d Barooga 4.5
- 1986 - Barooga were undefeated

Fourths Football

- 1962 -
- 1970 - Barooga
- 1971 - Katunga
- 1972 - Barooga
- 1973 -
- 1974 -
- 1975 -
- 1976 - ? v Barooga
- 1977 - Barooga
- 1978 - Katunga
- 1979 -
- 1980 - Barooga
- 1981 - Barooga
- 1982 - Barooga
- 1983 - Barooga d Blighty
- 1984 - Katunga
- 1985 - ? v Barooga
- 1986 - Barooga 10.13 d Deniliquin Rovers 6.4
- 1987 - Barooga: 13.11 d Katunga: 0.1
- 1988 - Barooga: 11.18 d Waaia: 0.0
- 1989 - Katunga
- 1990 - Katunga
- 1991 - Katunga
- 1992 - Katunga
- 1993 - Katunga
- 1994 - Katunga
- 1995 -
- 1996 -
- 1997 -
- 1998 -
- 1999 -
- 2000 - Katandra 5.3 d Tungamah 2.2
- 2001 -
- 2002 -
- 2003 -
- 2004 -
- 2005 - Katunga
- 2006 -
- 2007 -
- 2008 -
- 2009 - NW: Berrigan 13.8 d Strathmerton 1.2
- 2009 - SE: Shep East 14.14 d Katamatite 1.1
- 2010 - NW: Jerilderie 7.12 d Strathmerton 2.4
- 2010 - SE: Shep East 5.5 d Katunga 2.6
- 2011 - NW: Jerilderie 6.5 d Strathmerton 5.10
- 2011 - SE: Shep East 5.20 d Tungamah 3.5
- 2012 - NW: Strathmerton 12.9 d Deni Rovers 1.8
- 2012 - SE: Tungamah 6.4 d Shep East 6.3
- 2013 - NW: Deni Rovers 8.5 d Strathmerton 6.4
- 2013 - SE: Shep East 11.11 d Tungamah 3.3
- 2014 - NW: Deni Rovers 10.7 d Jerilderie 1.1
- 2014 - SE: Tungamah 8.11 d Rennie 5.1
- 2015 - NW: Strathmerton 5.14 d Berrigan 1.5
- 2015 - SE: Shep East 6.12 d Tungamah 6.4
- 2016 - NW: Strathmerton 5.4 d Jerilderie 1.3
- 2016 - SE: Tungamah 14.14 d Shep East 0.3
- 2017 - NW: Tocumwal 14.5 d Deni Rovers 4.3
- 2017 - SE: Rennie 3.4 d Tungamah 2.5
- 2018 - Deni Rovers 7.16 d Katunga 0.1
- 2019 - Rennie 9.18 d Strathmerton 2.0
- 2020 - P&DFNL in recess > COVID-19
- 2021 - 1st Rennie 2nd Picola United (No finals series > COVID-19)
- 2022 - Tocumwal 6.5 d Deni Rovers 5.8
- 2023 - Jerilderie 2.2 d Berrigan 2.1
- 2024 - Tungamah 8.9 d Berrigan 3.6
- 2025 - Berrigan 8.3 d Picola United 4.5
- 2026 - Deniliquin Rovers 4.3 d Barooga 2.5

== Football Grand Finals ==
Association / League Title History

- 1897 – Murray River District Football Association (MRDFA);
- 1898 & 1899 – Nathalia and District Football Association (NDFA);
- 1900 to 1903 – Barmah Central Football Association (BCFA);
- 1904 – Nathalia and District Football Association (NDFA);
- 1905 to 1907 – Picola and District Football Association (PDFA);
- 1908 to 1933 – Western and Moira Ridings Football Association (WMRFA);
- 1934 to 1946 – Picola and District Football Association (PDFA);
- 1947 to present – Picola and District Football League (PDFL)

Senior Football

Year	Premiers	Score	Runners up	Score	Best on Ground	Coach	Venue / Comments
Murray River District Football Association (Campbell's Trophy)
1897	1st: Kotupna						3 wins, 1 loss. Unsure of G/Final
	1st: Barmah						3 wins, 1 loss
Nathalia & District Football Association
1898	1st: Cummeragunja*		2nd: Kotupna				Undefeated premiers
1899	1st: Cummeragunja*						Undefeated premiers
Barmah Central Football Association
1900	1st: Barmah Federals		2nd: Kotupna				
			2nd: Moira				
1901	1st: Nathalia*						Undefeated premiers
1902	1st: Bahmah Federals		2nd: Kotupna				
			2nd: Picola				
1903	1st: Kotupna						Unbeaten Premiers
Nathalia & District Football Association
1904	1st: Nathalia						
Picola & District Football Association
1905	1st: Barmah Federals						
1906	1st: Picola						
1907	1st: Picola						
Western & Moira Ridings Football Association
1908	1st: Picola		2nd: Nathalia				
1909	Barmah Federals	1.5 - 11	Cummeragunja	1.3 - 9			Cummeragunja
1910	?						Protest: Moira v Barmah
1911	Kotupna	41 defeated	Cummeragunja	12			Moira. No result published?
1912	Barmah Federals						
1913	Barmah Federals	8.9 - 57	Nathalia	1.1 - 7			Picola
1914	Picola	1.5 - 11	Barmah Federals	1.4 - 10			Moira
1915	Barmah Federals?						Barmah: Minor Premiers
1916-18							In recess > World War I
1919	Barmah Federals	5.7 - 37	Picola	2.5 - 17			
1920	?						P&DFA Draw
1921	Cummeragunja	6.12 - 48	Barmah	3.10 - 28			
1922	Moira	4.5 - 29	Barmah	2.5 - 17			
1923	Kotupna	7.8 - 50	Barmah	5.5 - 35			
1924	Moira	5.2 - 32	Kotupna	2.3 - 15			Picola
1925	Moira	7.7 - 49	Barmah	4.6 - 30			
1926	Cummeragunja	7.11 - 53	Barmah	2.8 - 20			
1927	Cummeragunja	14.16 - 100	Yalca North	6.10 - 46			
1928	Cummeragunja	7.3 - 45	Yalca North	6.5 - 41			
1929	Cummeragunja	8.19 - 67	Moira	6.13 - 49			
1930	Yalca North	6.8 - 44	Cummeragunja	5.10 - 40			
1931	Cummeragunja	9.13 - 67	Nathalia	7.12 - 54			
1932	Nathalia	8.8 - 56	Yalca North	7.11 - 53			
1933	Barmah	12.12 - 84	Yalca North	8.8 - 56			
Picola & District Football Association
1934	Barmah	14.19 - 103	Yalca North	8.7 - 55			
1935	Picola	7.13 - 55	Barmah	5.5 - 35			
1936	Strathmerton	12.14 - 84	Barmah	7.12 - 54			Nathalia
1937	Strathmerton*	8.17 - 65	Moira	9.10 - 64		T O'Brien	Undefeated premiers
1938	Barmah	11.8 - 74	Picola	9.8 - 62			Picola
1939	Yalca North	8.12 - 60	Barmah	6.5 - 41			Picola
1940	Moira	9.9 - 63	Waaia	4.4 - 28			Picola
1941-45							In recess > World War II
1946	Moira	13.7 - 85	Barmah	7.11 - 53			Picola
1947	Nathalia 2nds	8.15 - 63	Yalca North	7.18 - 60			Picola
1948	Moiira	9.6 - 60	Nathalia 2nds	6.12 - 48			Picola
1949	Picola	13.13 - 91	Yalca North	5.13 - 43			Picola
1950	Katamatite	11.17 - 83	Numurkah 2nds	8.5 - 53			Nathalia
1951	Numurkah 2nds	10.17 - 77	Picola	10.15 - 75			Nathalia
1952	Picola	14.2 - 86	Katamatite	11.7 - 73			Waaia
1953	Waaia	10.15 - 75	Picola	7.15 - 51		Bob Goggin	Waaia
1954	Picola	11.12 - 78	Katamatite	5.4 - 34			Waaia
1955	Picola	13.13 - 91	Moira	13.9 - 87			Nathalia
1956	Picola	10.10 - 70	Moira	7.7 - 49			Nathalia. $148
1957	Moira	12.9 - 81	Yalca North	11.10 - 76			Nathalia
1958	Wunghnu	15.16 - 106	Picola	7.7 - 49			Wilby / (undefeated premiers)
1959	Barooga	11.13 - 79	Wunghnu	9.18 - 72			
1960	Barooga	15.15 - 105	Katunga	14.10 - 94			
1961	Barooga	11.10 - 76	Wunghnu	8.13 - 61			
1962	Picola	11.15 - 81	Katunga	9.10 - 64			
1963	Yarroweyah	11.8 - 74	Barooga	9.8 - 62			
1964	Wunghnu	8.10 - 58	Yarroweyah	8.8 - 56			Katunga
1965	Wunghnu	9.12 - 66	Barooga	6.7 - 43			
1966	Wunghnu	16.14 - 110	Picola	13.10 - 88			Katunga
1967	Picola	15.8 - 98	Yarroweyah	13.10 - 88			
1968	Katunga	12.10 - 82	Yarroweyah	9.14 - 68			
1969	Blighty	12.17 - 89	Yarroweyah	12.9 - 81			
1970	Yarroweyah	23.9 - 147	Wunghnu	17.12 - 114			
1971	Blighty	10.7 - 67	Yarroweyah	9.8 - 62			
1972	Yarroweyah	18.19 - 127	Blighty	10.4 - 64			
1973	Wunghnu	8.4 - 52	Waaia	6.9 - 45			
1974	Waaia	17.9 - 111	Blighty	9.10 - 64		Don Rudd	
1975	Blighty	9.16 - 70	Barooga	7.10 - 52			
1976	Barooga	11.8 - 74	Katunga	10.12 - 72			
1977	Katunga	21.16 - 142	Waaia	13.9 - 87			
1978	Barooga	15.7 - 97	Deniliquin Rovers	14.4 - 88			
1979	Barooga	19.20 - 134	Deniliquin Rovers	20.10 - 130			
1980	Yarroweyah	14.12 - 96	Wunghnu	9.8 - 62			
1981	Barooga	21.11 - 137	Katunga	13.12 - 90			
1982	Barooga	24.9 - 153	Katunga	9.7 - 70			
1983	Katunga	20.18 - 138	Picola United	14.13 - 97			
1984	Katunga	5.12 - 42	Deniliquin Rovers	3.10 - 28			
1985	Yarroweyah	13.14 - 92	Deniliquin Rovers	7.11 - 53		C Barton	
1986	Barooga	19.19 - 133	Wunghnu	15.11 - 101	David Brooks (B)	S Maddox	
1987	Barooga	17.14 - 116	Wunghnu	8.14 - 62	Paul Brooks (B)	M O'Dwyer	
1988	Yarroweyah	22.18 - 150	Katunga	7.14 - 56	Steve Koopman (Y)	G Hazelman	
1989	Waaia	15.14 - 104	Blighty	10.12 - 72	Mitch Power (W)	Mick Power	
1990	Waaia	16.18 - 114	Blighty	18.5 - 113	Mark Bell (W)	Mick Power	
1991	Waaia	14.11 - 91	Mathoura	13.8 - 86	Chris Doyle (M)	Trevor Morris	
1992	Waaia	11.5 - 71	Katunga	7.6 - 48	Malcom Moon (W)	Darren Scott	
1993	Mathoura	21.15 - 141	Waaia	12.5 - 77	Jamie Murphy (M)	G Ogden	
1994	Waaia	18.9 - 117	Picola United	11.8 - 74	Greg Hixon (W)	Jon Varcoe	
1995	Waaia	13.11 - 89	Deniliquin Rovers	11.7 - 73	Greg Hixon (W)	Jon Varcoe	
1996	Katamatite	7.8 - 50	Strathmerton	3.9 - 27	Chris Collins (K)	B Brooks	
1997	Strathmerton	12.12 - 84	Katamatite	7.13 - 55	Chris Bell (S)	Greg Downie	
1998	Katandra	10.12 - 72	Katunga	3.9 - 27	Cameron Damon (K)	Greg Reynoldson	
1999	Tungamah	9.11 - 65	Blighty	9.11 - 65			Drawn Grand Final
1999	Tungamah	12.16 - 88	Blighty	6.10 - 46	Robert Wren (T)	Robert Wren	Grand Final replay
2000	Blighty	11.9 - 75	Katamatite	7.6 - 48	Damian Sexton (B)	Damian Sexton	
2001	Katamatite	15.12 - 102	Blighty	11.5 - 71	Lyndon Snelling (K)	D Kennedy	
2002	Waaia	13.7 - 85	Strathmerton	5.7 - 37	Adam Waasdorp (W)	Trevor Laffy	
2003	Katandra	20.8 - 128	Tungamah	9.13 - 67	Mark Collins (K)	M Nolen/C Pohlner	
2004	Katandra	9.14 - 68	Katamatite	7.2 - 44	Mark Collins (K)	Aaron Plant	
2005	Waaia	12.13 - 85	Tungamah	9.12 - 84	David Daniels (W)	Mick Cleeland	Katunga
2006	Shepparton East	16.5 - 101	Katandra	11.10 - 76	Joe Perkovic (SE)	G Doyle	
2007	Dookie United	10.15 - 75	Katandra	7.16 - 58	James Emanuelli (DU)	D Osborne	
2008	Tungamah	21.17 - 143	Katandra	12.10 - 82	Jose Tejones (T)	Robert Wren	
Picola & DFNL: Two Divisions - North West & South East (2009 to 2017)
2009	NW: Jerilderie	9.14 - 68	Berrigan	8.17 - 65	NW: Chris Marshall (J)	NW: Jason Sanderson	Blighty
	SE: Tungamah	11.15 - 81	Shepparton East	5.12 - 42	SE: Joel Hearn (T)	SE: Adam Dodd	Dookie
2010	NW: Strathmerton	5.12 - 42	Yarroweyah	4.4 - 28	NW: S Dickinson (S)	NW: S Dickinson	Jerilderie
	SE: Shepparton East	17.13 - 115	Tungamah	10.7 - 67	SE: Jason Traianidis (SE)	SE: Hayden Best	Strathmerton. Undefeated Premiers
2011	NW: Berrigan	16.6 - 102	Jerilderie	10.11 - 71	NW: Gerald Towler (B)	NW: Jamie Robinson	Berrigan
	SE: Rennie	11.7 - 73	Shepparton East	9.8 - 62	SE: Josh Woods (R)	SE: Leigh Ramsdale	Barooga
2012	NW: Jerilderie	19.16 - 13	Berrigan	9.12 - 81	NW: Lachy Taylor Nugent (J)	NW: Jason Sanderson	Strathmerton
	SE: Shepparton East	14.16 - 100	Waaia	11.8 - 74	SE: Matthew Hodgetts (SE)	SE: Hayden Best	Katunga
2013	NW: Jerilderie	18.10 - 118	Strathmerton	11.10 - 76	NE: Nicholas Keating (J)	NW: J Bode	Deniliquin
	SE: Tungamah	17.20 - 122	Waaia	15.6 - 96	SE: Daniel Ellis (T)	SE: D Payne	Rennie
2014	NW: Jerilderie	22.15 - 147	Strathmerton	13.8 - 86	NW: James Gregory (J)	NW: J Bode	Yarroweyah
	SE: Tungamah	24.14 - 158	Katamatite	8.4 - 52	SE: Daniel Ellis (Y)	SE:N Doyle/W Cooper	Tungamah
2015	NW: Strathmerton	12.13 - 85	Jerilderie	10.9 - 69	NW: Brad O'Connor (S)	NW: Tim Bramich	Mathoura
	SE: Tungamah	19.9 - 123	Waaia	9.11 - 65	SE: Nick Lawless (T)	SE: Jeremy O'Brien	Waaia
2016	NW: Picola United	18.7 - 115	Strathmerton	5.2 - 32	NW: David Daniel (PU)	NW: John Varcoe	Picola
	SE: Shepparton East	10.14 - 74	Tungamah	7.9 - 51	SE: Jeremy O'Brien (T)	SE: Dwayne Vidler	Katamatite. Undefeated Premiers
2017	NW: Picola United	11.4 - 70	Strathmerton	7.10 - 52	NW: Max Canfield (S)	NW: John Varcoe	Blighty
	SW: Rennie	11.9 - 75	Tungamah	9.8 - 62	SE: Matt Pendergast (R)	SE: Craig Ednie	Katandra
Picola & District Football Netball League
2018	Rennie	9.8 - 62	Picola United	3.6 - 24	Nick O'Bryan (R)	Craig Ednie	Jerilderie
2019	Strathmerton	12.15 - 87	Waaia	7.7 - 49	Lance Oswald (S)	Tim Bramich &	Berrigan
						Shannon Edgar	
2020							In recess > COVID-19
2021	1st: Strathmerton		2nd: Waaia		Season abandoned	after 14 rounds	No finals > COVID-19
					Tom Henderson Medal		
2022	Waaia	13.15 - 93	Tungamah	7.6 - 48	Ash Holland (W)	Mitch Cleeland &	Katunga
						Mark Meyland	
2023	Waaia	12.11 - 83	Strathmerton	6.7 - 43	Ash Thompson (W)	Mitch Cleeland	Strathmerton
2024	Waaia	12.9 - 81	Katandra	5.7 - 37	Jesse Trower (W)	Mitch Cleeland	Rennie
2025	Katamatite	14.6.90	Waaia	10.9.69	Zach Del Grosso (K)	James Hazleman	Deniliquin (13/9/25)
2026	Katamatite	12.8.80	Waaia	10.15.75	Tom Clurey (K)	Tom Clurey	Mathoura (12/9/26)
Year	Premiers	Score	Runner Up	Score	Best on Ground	Coach	Venue / Comments

== Picola & DFNL - Football Premiership Table ==
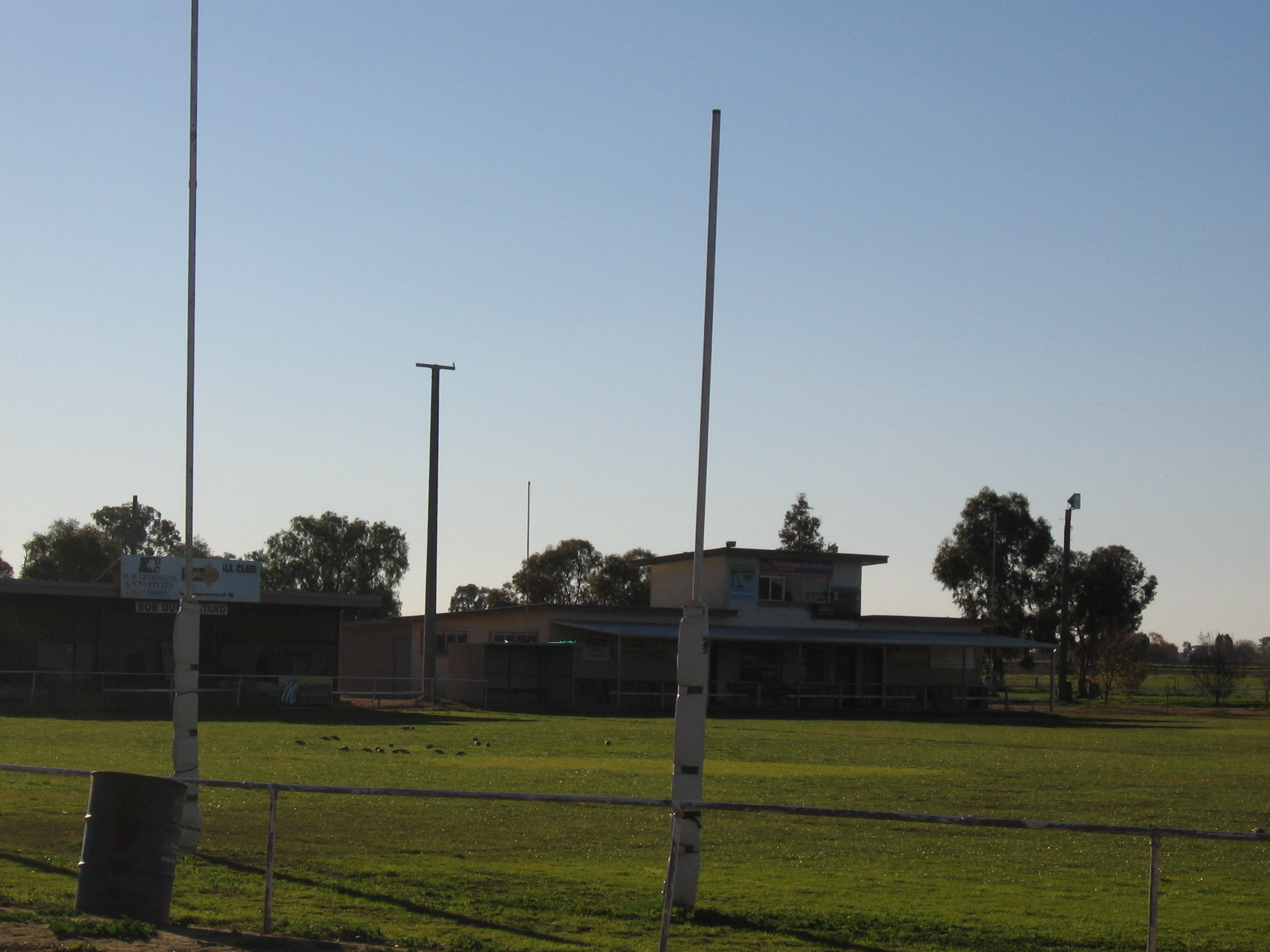
Waaia Football Ground

Picola & DFNL – Senior Football Premiers / Grand Final participants from 1934 to 2026.

Club	Premierships	Runners Up	Draws	Total
Waaia	13	11		24
Barooga	10	3		13
Picola	8	5		13
Strathmerton	6	7		13
Tungamah	6	6	1	13
Yarroweyah	6	6		12
Katamatite	5	6		11
Wunghnu	5	6		11
Katunga	4	8		12
Blighty	4	6	1	11
Moira	4	3		7
Jerilderie	4	2		6
Shepparton East	4	2		6
Katandra	3	4		7
Rennie	3	0		3
Barmah	2	4		6
Picola United	2	3		5
Yalcah North	1	4		5
Berrigan	1	2		3
Mathoura	1	1		2
Nathalia 2nds	1	1		2
Numurkah 2nds	1	1		2
Dookie United	1	0		1
Deniliquin Rovers	0	5		5
Total	94	94	2	190

- Note: As at September 2026.

== Picola & DFL – Best & Fairest ==
The Pearce Medal is named after former Moria FC footballer and president, Picola & DFL president and Life Member, Cyril Walter Pearce, who was president from 1940 to 1949 and also from 1952 to 1974. Pearce died in 1974, aged 73. There is no complete list of previous senior football best and fairest winners available from the P&DFNL.

Four-time Picola & DFL best and fairest medallist and Picola footballer, David McKenzie polled a record 45 votes in 1963, from 16 games, McKenzie polled an incredible 15 x three votes.

Picola & DFNL: Best & Fairest Award: Pearce Medal: Senior Football

Year	Division	Best & Fairest	Club	Votes
1937		D Smith	Yalca North	
1941-45	P&DFA	in recess >	World War II	
1946				
1947				
1948		Keith Cowan	Waaia	
1949				
1950				
1951				
1952				
1953		M Roughsedge	Wunghnu	
1954				
1955				
1956		Ivor Jeffs	Waaia	24
		M Roughsedge *	Wunghnu	(24)
1957				
1958		John Cossens	Katunga	19
1959				
1960		Vin Toohey	Barooga	
1961		Vin Toohey	Barooga	28
1962				
1963		David McKenzie	Picola	45
1964		David McKenzie	Picola	
1965		David McKenzie	Picola	24
1966		Graeme Frew	Katunga	28
1967		David McKenzie	Picola	
1968		Doug Eddy	Barooga	
1969		Lance Lane	Barooga	
1970				
1971				
1972				
1973		Adrian Bennett	Barooga	
1974		Don Rudd	Waaia	
1975		Robert McEwan	Barooga	
1976		Robert McEwan	Barooga	
1977		Mick Power	Waaia	
1978		Ron Atkin	Waaia	
1979				
1980		Greg Kinross	Katanga	
1981		Cameron Mattox	Barooga	
1982		Frank Houlihan	Waaia	
1983				
1984				
1985				
1986		David Brooks	Barooga	
1987				
1988				
1989				
1990		Chris Duggan	Mathoura	
1991		Anthony Wilson	Waaia	
1992		Wayne Jackson	Katunga	
1993		S Joyce	Wunghnu	
1994		Shane Gilligan &	Deniliquin Rovers	
		S Joyce	Wunghnu	
1995		Shane Gilligan	Deniliquin Rovers	
1996		BJ Ryan	Strathmerton	
1997		Matthew Collins	Katandra	
1998		Damian Sexton	Blighty	
1999		Damian Sexton	Blighty	
2000		Des Jenkins	Katunga	
2001		Damian Sexton	Blighty	25
2002		Adam Waasdorp	Waaia	
2003		Howard Yelland	Berrigan	
2004		Adam Waasdorp	Yarroweyah	
2005		Adam Brunt	Picola United	
2006		Adam Brunt	Picola United	
2007		Matt Wellington	Katunga	
2008		Steven Scott	Waaia	
Picola & DFNL: Two Divisions - North West & South East (2009 to 2017)
2009	North West	Andrew May	Deniliquin Rovers	
	South East	Jason Wild	Katamatite	
2010	North West	Matthew Gorman	Berrigan	
	South East	Ricky Frappell	Shepparton East	
2011	North West	Matthew Gorman	Berrigan	
	South East	Luke Cowan	Waaia	
2012	North West	Josh Evans	Strathmerton	
	South East	Nick Doyle	Tungamah	33
2013	North West	Chris Marshall	Jerilderie	
	South East	Nick Doyle	Tungamah	
2014	North West	Andrew May	Jerilderie	
	South East	Luke Minogue &	Katandra	
	South East	Tyson Saunders	Katamatite	
2015	North West	Paul Massingham	Berrigan	
	South East	Matt McCarty &	Waaia	
	South East	Nick Doyle	Tungamah	
2016	North West	David Daniel &	Picola United	
	North West	Andrew May	Deniliquin Rovers	
	South East	Matt McCarty &	Waaia	
	South East	Matt Reindina &	Shepparton East	
	South East	Eamon Reeves	Katunga	
2017	North West	Jed Brain	Blighty	
	South East	Bodhi Butts	Tungamah	22
Picola & DFNL: 2018 to 2026
2018		Mark Ryan &	Picola United	21
		Ash Thompson	Waaia	21
2019		John Woodcock	Katamatite	20
2020	P&DFNL in recess due to COVID-19			
2021		Chris Marshall	Jerilderie	23
2022		Ash Holland	Waaia	22
2023		Jake Ellery	Strathmerton	27
2024		Sam Ferguson	Tungamah	25
2025		Lochie Conboy	Berrigan	25
2026		Bailey Bell	Katandra	33
Picola & DFNL: Two Divisions - North West & South East (2027 to)
2027	North West			
	South West			
Year	Division	Best & Fairest	Club	Votes

- - 1956: M Roughsedge (Wunghnu) tied with the winner on votes, but finished as runner up under the old countback system.

Reserves Football - McKenzie Medal

The P&DFNL Reserves competition best and fairest award is called the McKenzie Medal after former Picola and Fitzroy footballer and long time P&DFNL President, David McKenzie. No list of previous winners available from the P&DFNL.

- 1962 -
- 1963 -
- 1964 -
- 1965 -
- 1966 - R Lodding: Yarroweyah (27)
- 1967 - Merv Campbell: Katunga
- 1968 -
- 1969 -
- 1970 -
- 1971 -
- 1972 -
- 1973 -
- 1974 -
- 1975 -
- 1976 -
- 1977 -
- 1978 - Russell Cook: Katunga
- 1979 -
- 1980 -
- 1981 -
- 1982 - B Herbert: Barooga
- 1983 -
- 1999 - Mark Hendy: Katunga
- 2000 -
- 2001 - Mark Hendy: Katunga
- 2002 -
- 2003 - A Everard: Katandra
- 2004 - Andrew Simson: Mathoura
- 2005 -
- 2009 - M Spacey: Mathoura
- 2010 -
- 2011 -
- 2012 - NW: Ben Nash: Jerilderie
- 2016 - M Downes: Katandra
- 2017 -
- 2018 -
- 2019 -
- 2020 - P&DFNL in recess > COVID-19
- 2021 -
- 2022 -
- 2023 -
- 2024 - Matthew Ross: Berrigan - 29 votes
- 2025 - Harry Parsons: Strathmerton
- 2026 - Ray Ireland: Katandra
- 2027

Thirds Football - Payne Medal

No list of previous winners available from the P&DFNL.

- 1968 -
- 1969 -
- 1970 -
- 1971 -
- 1972 -
- 1973 -
- 1974 -
- 1975 -
- 1976 - Mark Kinross: Katunga
- 1977 -
- 1978 -
- 1979 -
- 1980 -
- 1981 -
- 1982 -
- 1983 -
- 1984 -
- 1985 -
- 1986 - T Brooks: Barooga
- 1987 -
- 1988 - B Lavery: Barooga
- 1989 -
- 1990 - Matt Cason: Katunga
- 1991 -
- 1992 - Marcus Flanagan: Katunga
- 1993 -
- 1994 -
- 1995 -
- 1996 -
- 1997 -
- 1998 -
- 1999 -
- 2000 -
- 2001 -
- 2002 -
- 2003 -
- 2004 -
- 2005 -
- 2006 -
- 2007 -
- 2008 -
- 2009 -
- 2010 - Elliott Small: Katunga
- 2011 -
- 2012 - C Olsen: Katandra
- 2013 - Adam Hicks: Katunga
- 2014 -
- 2015 -
- 2016 -
- 2017 -
- 2018 -
- 2019 -
- 2020 -
- 2021 -
- 2022 -
- 2023 -
- 2024 -
- 2025 - Logan White: Tocumwal
- 2026 - Billy Dwyer: Dookie United
- 2027 -

Fourths Football - Smith Medal

No list of previous winners available from the P&DFNL.

- 1977 - Vern Thorp: Katunga
- 1978 - Spiro Chrisafis: Katunga
- 1979 -
- 1980 -
- 1981 -
- 1982 -
- 1983 - P Brooks: Barooga
- 1984 - Craig Crilly: Katunga
- 1985 - Chris O'Dwyer: Katunga
- 1986 - B Lavery: Barooga
- 1987 - Matt Cason: Katunga
- 1988 - S Chisholm: Barooga
- 1989 - Paul Richardson: Katunga
- 1990 -
- 2008 - Elliott Small: Katunga
- 2009 -
- 2014 - Spencer Small: Katunga
- 2015 -
- 2016 -
- 2017 - Max Hendy: Katunga
- 2018 -
- 2025 - Beau Griffiths: Picola United
- 2026 - Wyatt Twite: Barooga
- 2027 -

== Leading Goalkicker ==
The record number of goals kicked in a season is currently held by Jerilderie footballer, Aaron Purcell with 232 goals in 2013. Between 2013 and 2015, Purcell kicked 490 goals in three seasons for Jerilderie. Prior to this Waaia's Danny Irwin kicked 215 goals in 1992. The goal kicking statistics are supplied via the Gameday website and are entered by the Picola & DFNL clubs.

Most goals in season

- 215 - Danny Irwin: Waaia, 1992
- 232 - Aaron Purcell: Jerilderie, 2013

Most goals in a match

- 31 - Joshua Bode: Deniliquin Rovers v Wunghnu, 2010
- 30 - Peter Macheda: Tungamah v Wunghnu, 2005

Seniors

	Picola & DFNL: Senior Football Leading & Century Goalkickers				
Year	Winner	Club	Season Goals	Goals in finals	Total Goals
Nathalia & District Football Association
1898	F Coghill	Cummerajunga			14
Picola & District Football League
1961	P Graham	Wunghnu	88		
1962					
1963					
1964	Frank Browne	Barroga	66		
1965	Dave Farrar	Wunghnu	67		
1966	Dave Farrar	Wunghnu	82		
1990	Danny Irwin	Waaia	115		
1991					
1992	Danny Irwin	Waaia			215
1993					
1994					
1995					
1996					
1997					
1998					
1999					
2000	Peter Leahy	Katandra			105
2001	1st: R McCartney	Blighty			107
	2nd: T Heenan	Katamatite			104
2002					
2003					
2004					
2005					
2006					
2007					
2008					
2009	NW: Chase Strawhorn	Jerilderie	67	12	79
	SE: Derek Hall	Katandra	81	2	83
2010	NW:Brody Lumber	Mathoura	70	5	75
	SE:Chase Strawhorn	Rennie	78	4	82
2011	NW:Chase Saunders	Berrigan	70	14	84
	SE:Chase Strawhorn	Rennie	98	15	113
2012	NW: Brody Lumber	Blighty	107	5	112
	SE: Chase Strawhorn	Rennie	102	9	111
2013	NW:1st: Aaron Purcell	Jerilderie	221	11	232
	NW:2nd: Josh Evans	Strathmerton	101	18	119
	SE: Coby Aynsley	Shepparton East	59	9	68
2014	NW: Aaron Purcell	Jerilderie	120	16	136
	SE:Cobey Aynsley	Shepparton East	61	0	61
2015	NW:Aaron Purcell	Jerilderie	106	16	122
	SE: Ash Saunders	Tungamah	123	11	134
2016	NW:Terry Lumbar	Deniliquin Rovers	50	2	52
	SE:Cobey Aynsley	Shepparton East	90	16	106
2017	NW: Jed Brain	Blighty	48	6	54
	SE:Chase Strawhorn	Rennie	55	14	69
2018	?				
2019	Ash Saunders	Tungamah	58	5	63
2020		P&DFNL	in	recess >	COVID-19
2021	Charlie Burrows	Waaia	51	n/a	51
2022	Fergus Lappin	Katunga	80	8	88
2023	Tim Looby	Strathmerton	88	11	99
2024	Tim Looby	Strathmerton	113	10	123
2025	Ned McKeown	Tungamah	98	11	109
2026	Riley Gow	Barooga	91	10	101

- Most goals in a game
  - 31 - Josh Bode (Deni Rovers) - Rd.16, 2010: Deniliquin Rovers v Wunghnu at Deniliquin.
  - 25 - Aaron Purcell (Jerilderie) - Rd.7, 2013: Yarroweyah v Jerilderie at Yarroweyah

== Netball Premierships ==
An official women's "basketball" competition commenced in the Picola region in 1962 with a junior and senior competition, with "netball" being its official title from 1970 onwards when women's basketball was renamed netball in Australia in 1970.

The Picola District Netball League merged with the Picola & District Football League in 2013 to become the Picola & District Football / Netball League.

From 2021, the best on court award in the A. Grade grand final receives the Faye Cook Award.

Picola Netball Association: 1962 to 1993 Senior & Junior Premierships
Year	Seniors	B. Grade	C. Grade	C. Reserve	Juniors	Jun-Junior	Midgets
1962	Katunga				Barooga		
1963	Barooga				Barooga		
1964	Picola				Katunga		
1965	Barooga				Yalca		
1966	Katunga				Katunga		
1967	Yalca North				Katunga		
1968	Waaia				Katunga		
1969	Katunga				Yarroweyah		
1970	Wunghnu				Picola		
1971	Wunghnu				Katunga		
1972	Katunga				Picola		
1973	Waaia				Waaia		
1974	Blighty				Katunga		
1975	Blighty				Katunga		
1976	Katunga				Picola		
1977	Katunga				Barooga		
	A. Grade						
1978	Picola				Wunghnu	Katunga	Barooga
1979	Katunga				Barooga	Barooga	Barooga
1980	Yarroweyah				Waaia	Waaia	Katunga
1981	Yarrqweyah				Barooga	Barooga	Barooga
1982	Yarroweyah				Picola	Katunga	Picola
1983	Waaia	Waaia			Barooga	Barooga	Katunga
1984	Waaia	Waaia			Barooga	Waaia	Barooga
1985	Barooga	Waaia			Waaia	Blighty	Yarroweyah
1986	Waaia	Waaia			Barroga	Barooga	Yarroweyah
1987	Waaia	Picola			Barooga	Barooga	Barooga
1988	Barooga	Waaia			Barooga	Katunga	Barooga
1989	Waaia	Katunga			Picola	Katunga	Picola
1990	Mathoura	Katunga			Katunga	Katunga	Katunga
1991	Waaia	Waaia	Waaia		Katunga	Mathoura	Mathoura
1992	Mathoura	Katunga	Waaia		Yarroweyah	Katunga	Yarroweyah
1993	Yarroweyah	Yarraoweyah	Picola	Yarroweyah	Yarroweyah	Yarroweyah	Wunghnu
Year	A. Grade	B. Grade	C. Grade	C. Reserve	Juniors	Jun-Juniors	Midgets

Picola District Netball League: 1994 to 2008 Senior & Under Age Premierships
Year	A. Grade	B. Grade	C. Grade	C. Reserve	17 Under	15 Under	13 Under
1994	Mathoura	Katunga	Yarroweyah	Strathmerton	Yarroweyah	Strathmerton	Waaia
1995	Katamatite	Tungamah	Katunga	Katunga	Yarroweyah	Picola	Waaia
1996	Strathmerton	Yarroweyah	Katunga	Yarroweyah	Strathmerton	Tungamah	Strathmerton
1997	Strathmerton	Yarroweyah	Waaia	Strathmerton	Waaia	Yarroweyah	Katunga
1998	Katunga	Yarroweyah	Wunghnu	Katandra	Yarroweyah	Picola	Picola
1999	Blighty	Katunga	Katunga	Yarroweyah	Tungamah	Tungamah	Picola
2000	Tungamah	Katandra	Yarroweyah	Deniliquin Rovers	Waaia	Tungamah	Waaia
2001	Katunga	Yarroweyah	Picola	Katandra	Tungamah	Picola	Katandra
2002	Strathmerton	Blighty	Katandra	Tungamah	Tungamah	Tungamah	Katunga
2003	Strathmerton	Tungamah	Tungamah	Strathmerton	Katandra	Strathmerton	Tungamah
2004	Mathoura	Mathoura	Yarroweyah	Yarroweyah	Berrigan	Blighty	Picola
2005	Tungamah	Mathoura	Tungamah	Tungamah	Deniliquin Rovers	Katunga	Katamatite
2006	Mathoura	Mathoura	Katunga	Shepparton East	Katunga	Yarroweyah	Tungamah
2007	Mathoura	Mathourna	Shepparton East	Katamatite	Picola	Blighty	Berrigan
2008	Shepparton East	Katandra	Shepparton East	Katunga	Katandra	Blighty	Blighty

Picola & DFNL (Netball): North West & South East Divisions. 2009 to 2017 Senior & Under Age Premierships
Year	Division	A. Grade	B. Grade	C. Grade	C. Reserve	17 Under	15 Under	13 Under
2009	North West	Mathoura	Mathoura	Mathoura	Mathoura	Blighty	Strathmerton	Mathoura
	South East	Katandra	Tungamah	Katandra	Katunga	Katamatite	Tungamah	Tungamah
2010	North West	Mathoura	Deniliquin Rovers	Yarroweyah	Deniliquin Rovers	Jerilderie	Strathmerton	Yarroweyah
	South East	Rennie	Tungamah	Katunga	Waaia	Shepparton East	Dookie	Shepparton East
2011	North West	Strathmerton	Mathoura	Mathoura	Jerilderie	Yarroweyah	Mathoura	Deniliquin Rovers
	South East	Shepparton East	Katandra	Shepparton East	Katunga	Shepparton East	Rennie	Rennie
2012	North West	Jerilderie	Strathmerton	Mathoura	Yarroweyah	Blighty	Deniliquin Rovers	Jerilderie
	South East	Katandra	Katandra	Shepparton East	Waaia	Katunga	Waaia	Shepparton East
2013	North West	Strathmerton	Strathmerton	Picola United	Yarroweyah	?	?	?
	South East	Katandra	Katandra	Katandra	Shepparton East	?	?	?
2014	North West	Strathmerton	Mathoura	Deniliquin Rovers	Jerilderie	Jerilderie	Jerilderie	Jerilderie
	South East	Katandra	Tungamah	Waaia	Waaia	Dookie United	Waaia	Katandra
2015	North West	Tocumwal	Deniliquin Rovers	Deniliquin Rovers	Deniliquin Rovers	Jerilderie	Jerilderie	Strathmerton
	South East	Katamatite	Tungamah	Tungamah	Dookie United	Dookie United	Dookie United	Katandra
2016	North West	Tocumwal	Tocumwal	Jerilderie	Blighty	Jerilderie	Tocumwal	Strathmerton
	South East	Katamatite	Katandra	Katunga	Katandra	Tungamah	Rennie	Waaia
2017	North West	Tocumwal	Strathmerton	Jerilderie	Blighty	Strathmerton	Tocumwal	Picola United
	South East	Waaia	Waaia	Waaia	Dookie United	Tungamah	Tungamah	Waaia

Picola & DFNL (Netball): 2018 to 2025 Senior & Under Age Premierships
Year	A. Grade	B. Grade	C. Grade	C. Reserve	17 Under	15 Under	13 Under
2018	Deniliquin Rovers	Jerilderie	Waaia	Deniliquin Rovers	Rennie	Deniliquin Rovers	Rennie
2019	Strathmerton	Katunga	Berrigan	Katunga	Strathmerton	Rennie	Tocumwal
2020	P&DFNL	in recess	COVID-19				
2021 season abandoned after Round 14. No finals series played due to COVID-19. 2021 Minor Premiers listed below.
2021*	1st:Katunga	1st:Katunga	1st: Deniliquin Rovers	1st:Katandra	1st:Rennie	1st: Deniliquin Rovers	1st: Deniliquin Rovers
2022	Tungamah	Tungamah	Tungamah	Tungamah	Rennie	Rennie	Katandra
2023	Deniliquin Rovers	Strathmerton	Deniliquin Rovers	Deniliquin Rovers	Rennie	Rennie	Rennie
2024	Deniliquin Rovers	Deniliquin Rovers	Katunga	Katandra	Rennie	Deniliquin Rovers	Deniliquin Rovers
2025	Katandra	Deniliquin Rovers	Katunga	Tungamah d Waaia	Deniliquin Rovers	Deniliquin Rovers	Blighty
2026	Dookie United 25 d Deni Rovers 24	Tungamah 51 d Katunga 39	Tungamah 36 d Deni Rovers 27	Waaia 39 d Dookie United 38	Deni Rovers 53 d Rennie 37	Deni Rovers 30 d Tungamah 24	Tungamah 24 d Tocumwal 18
2027							

== Picola & DFNL - Netball Premiership Table ==
Picola & DFNL – A. Grade / Grand Final participants from 1962 to 2026.

Club	Premierships	Runners Up	Draws	Total
Katunga	9			
Waaia	9			
Mathoura	8			
Strathmerton	8			
Katandra	5			
Barooga	4			
Yarroweyah	4			
Blighty	3			
Deniliquin Rovers	3			
Katamatite	3			
Tocumwal	3			
Tungamah	3			
Shepparton East	2			
Wunghnu	2			
Jerilderie	1			
Picola	1			
Rennie	1			
Yalca North	1			
Dookie United	1			
Total	71			

- Note: As at September 2026.

== Netball League Best and Fairest Awards ==
Official "Senior" women's basketball in the Picola region commenced in 1962, with a best and fairest award, with the umpires awarding the votes.

The A. Grade netball best and fairest award is called the Lukies Medal.

Multiple A. Grade best and fairest winners.

- 5 - Julie Tyndall - Waaia: 1978, 1979, 1981, 1983 & 1987.
- 4 - Lucy Beehag - Deniliquin Rovers: 2012, 2013, 2016 & 2017.
- 2 - Sue McKenna - Mathoura: 1990 & 1991.
- 2 - N Knight - Yarroweyah: 1993 & 1994.
- 2 - Stephanie Teague - Katandra: 2009 & 2010.

=== Senior Netball Best and Fairest ===
	Picola DNA	Seniors/A Grade	Picola DNA	B. Grade	Picola DNA	C. Grade	Picola DNA	C. Reserve	Picola DNA
Year	Division	Commenced '62	Netball Club	Commenced 1983	Netball Club	Commenced 1991	Netball Club	Commenced 1993	Netball Club
1962		?							
1963		Penny Pearce	Moira						
1964		?							
1965		?							
1966		Joy Limbrick	Picola						
1967		?							
1968		Mary Pridmore	Picola						
1969		Margaret Brown	Yarroweyah						
1970		Robyn Rodgers	Katanga						
1971		Bev Gray	Wunghnu						
1972		Bev Gray	Wunghnu						
1973		Julie Koch	Barooga						
1974		Faye Cook	Katunga						
1975		?							
1976		Pam Larkin	Waaia						
1977		Winnie Van Luenen	Picola						
1978		Julie Tyndall	Waaia						
1979		Julie Tyndall	Waaia						
1980		Stacey Rogers	Katunga						
1981		Julie Tyndall	Waaia						
1982		K O'Hare	Waaia						
1983		Julie Tyndall	Waaia	?					
1984		K O'Hare	Waaia	Paula Hansen	Katunga				
1985		Deidre Cossens	Katunga	M Hocking	Wunghnu				
1986		Jill Guerra	Waaia	L Good	Barooga				
1987		Julie Tyndall	Waaia	A Doddridge	Deni Rovers				
1988		T McIntyre	Barooga	L McPherson	Wunghnu				
1989		J Terry	Picola United	L McPherson	Wunghnu				
1990		Sue McKenna	Mathoura	P Larkin	Waaia				
1991		Sue McKenna	Mathoura	T Bennie	Waaia	Carmel Jones	Katunga		
1992		Leanne Smith	Mathoura	Kerry Reghenzani	Katunga	Roslyn Patterson	Katunga		
1993		N Knight	Yarroweyah	A Maplestone	Yarroweyah	B Dealy	Waaia	Tania Dudley	Katunga
1994		N Knight	Yarroweyah	R Joyce	Wunghnu	A Munro	Wunghnu	C Danaher	Wunghnu
1995		J Maplestone	Yarroweyah	J Powles	Strathmerton	N Murrells	Deni Rovers	L Hicks	Yarroweyah
1996		N Trease	Katamatite	S Beckingham	Wunghnu	T Rowan	Katamatite	M Laidlaw	Strathmerton
1997		Margaret Blake	Mathoura	Lisa Collins &	Katunga	D Birch	Strathmerton	R Filliponi	Wunghnu
				S Falls &	Waaia				
				K Stewart	Yarroweyah				
1998		Judy Platfuss	Blighty	J Kennedy	Wunghnu	S Brown	Waaia	M Laidlaw	Strathmerton
1999		K Hildebrand	Katamatite	M Stokes	Katamatite	K Stewart	Yarroweyah	M Mathieson	Wunghnu
2000		S Jones &	Tungamah	N Hooper	Tungamah	S Oldham	Picola	N Thompson	Tungamah
		S Kennedy	Katamatite						
2001		S Oligive	Blighty	R Gamble	Tungamah	Denise Cusack	Katunga	M Sessions	Picola
2002		M Parkes	Blighty	E Riordan	Katandra	J Caniglia	Deni Rovers	M Sessions	Picola
2003		S Howard	Tungamah	N Burke	Blighty	C Macheda	Yarroweyah	M Sessions	Picola
2004		N Lukies	Katamatite	F Irvine	Tungamah	K Freeman	Waaia	S McBurnie	Tungamah
2005		Amelia Wyatt	Mathoura	L Guthrie	Picola	T Elder	Yarroweyah	L Gledhill	Katandra
2006		Alison Yeates	Mathoura	S Jones	Tungamah	K DiBlasi	Tungamah	Nicol Poole	Katunga
2007		Carly Young	Strathmerton	Felicity Irvine	Tungamah	Gina Sozzi	Shepparton East	S Brown	Waaia
2008		Jenny Buerckner	Tungamah	K Freeman	Picola	S Oldham	Picola	S Barnes	Katamatite
Picola & DFNL - (Netball): North West & South East Divisions. 2009 to 2017
2009	North West	Emma Rendell	Picola United	Corrine Mitsch	Mathoura	Casey Thompson	Picola United	Rhianna Thompson &	Picola United
								Emily Edgar	Mathoura
	South East	Stephanie Teague	Katandra	Amanda Gledhill	Katandra	Zoe Lawrence	Tocumwal	Lauralee Pola	Dookie United
2010	North West	Shelley Wilson	Mathoura	Tanya Hamilton	Jerilderie	Sally Simpson	Jerilderie	Bianca Nolen	Berrigan
	South East	Stephanie Teague	Katandra	Karina Kennedy	Tocumwal?	Sheree Baker	Shepparton East	Sally Brown &	Waaia
								Kath Hemphill	Rennie
2011	North West	Jane Schifferie	Blighty	Pam Smith	Picola United	Kirah Turri	Picola United	Ann Maree Jones	Yarroweyah
	South East	Jenni McCluskey	Shepparton East	Sandy Dickie	Tocumwal	Taylah Brown	Waaia	Kath Hemphill	Rennie
2012	North West	Lucy Beehag	Deniliquin Rovers	Nicole James	Picola United	Leanne Guthrie	Picola United	Dimity Bloomfield	Deniliquin Rovers
	South East	Georgie Bruce	Rennie	Jacqui Bell	Shepparton East	Jacinta West	Shepparton East	Tennille Gibson	Shepparton East
2013	North West	Lucy Beehag	Deniliquin Rovers	Stephanie Calder	Blighty	Leanne Guthrie	Picola United	Caitlyn Burke	Strathmerton
	South East	Rebecca Dudgeon	Katandra	Sara Jones	Tocumwal	Susan Barr	Katandra	Meagan Dooling	Shepparton East
2014	North West	Leah Pate	Tocumwal	Kim McPherson &	Picola United	Rachel Braybon	Deniliquin Rovers	Tegan Arnold	Deniliquin Rovers
				Shannon Mills &	Mathoura				
				Pam Smith	Picola United				
	South East	Aimee Sidebottom	Katandra	Katie Morris	Waaia	Tara Lennie &	Shepparton East	Tammy Watson	Rennie
						Claudia Walters	Katandra		
2015	North West	Suzanna Falls	Blighty	Simone Conn	Deniliquin Rovers	Emily Walker	Picola United	Judy Karakai	Berrigan
	South East	Holly Milner	Rennie	Katie Morris	Waaia	Stacey Petersen	Katunga	Naomi Hopkins	Waaia
2016	North West	Lucy Beehag	Deniliquin Rovers	Kendall Purcell	Jerilderie	Judith Karakai	Katunga	Nicky Burke	Berrigan
	South East	Shinae Sali	Katandra	Grace Tyack	Katunga	Lisa Baker	Katunga	Carly Beattie	Tungamah
2017	North West	Lucy Beehag	Deniliquin Rovers	Shannon Mills	Mathoura	Jessia Bailey	Strathmerton	Tayla Gittens	Mathoura
	South East	Taylah Shanahan	Waaia	Grace Tyack	Katunga	Katie Morris	Waaia	Emily Cooper-Watts	Katandra
Picola & DFNL - (Netball): One Division
2018		Rhiannon Maxwell	Blighty	Melissa Molloy	Katunga	Judith Karakai	Katunga	Olivia VanEvery	Strathmerton
2019		Leah Pate	Tocumwal	Paula Mika	Rennie	Peta Gowans	Berrigan	Maggie Ellis	Deniliquin Rovers
2020		In recess >	COVID-19						
2021		Rachel Crowther	Katunga	Rachael Howden	Katunga	Kate Mansfield	Katunga	Andrea Walker	Waaia
2022		Grace Thomson	Strathmerton	Rachael Howden &	Katunga	Chloe Bulmer	Deniliquin Rovers	Bernadette Attwood	Tungamah
				Natalie Sampson	Deniliquin Rovers				
2023		Chrissy Hurst	Deniliquin Rovers	Jackie Thorpe	Deniliquin Rovers	Peta Gowans	Berrigan	Andrea Walker	Waaia
2024		Ella Arnold	Jerilderie	Ruby Arnel	Waaia	Katie Towe	Katunga	Lauren Calder	Katandra
2025		Rhiannon Maxwell	Tocumwal	Natalie Likies	Katamatite	Rachel Howden	Katunga	Abbey Whitehorn	Deniliquin Rovers
2026		Rebecca Osmond	Katandra	Jade Opray	Barooga	Erika Martin	Deni Rovers	Ellis Sibraa	Waaia
Year	Division	A. Grade	Club	B. Grade	Club	C. Grade	Club	C. Reserve	Club

=== Junior Best and Fairest ===
	Juniors	Picola DNA	Jun-Juniors	Picola DNA	Midgets	Picola DNA
Year	Commenced 1962	Netball Club	Commenced 1962	Netball Club	Commenced 1978	Netball Club
1962						
1963	P McDonald	Moira				
1964						
1965						
1966						
1967	H Norman	Yarroweyah				
1968	P Cooper	Yarroweyah				
1969	P Cooper	Yarroweyah	L Freeman	Yarroweyah		
1970	V Hanna	Yarroweyah	Sandra Boase	Katunga		
1971	R McDonald	Picola United				
1972						
1973	J Corry	Picola United	L Wright	Picola United		
1974	Julie Tyndell	Waaia				
1975	H Webster	Barooga				
1976	W Hay	Blighty				
1977			A Green	Picola United		
1978	W Brown	Picola United	Cheryl Burkitt	Katunga	Dianne Shannon	Katunga
1979	W Carroll	Yarroweyah	T Hobley	Wunghnu	M McKenzie	Picola United
1980	W Brown	Picola United	M Anne Ryan	Waaia	H Toohey	Barooga
1981	E Toohey	Barooga	N Thorne	Waaia	J Aird	Picola United
1982	J McCalman	Blighty	L Savage	Blighty	C Farrant	Waaia
1983	L Savage	Blighty	K Clarke	Waaia	V Bell	Picola United
1984	L Savage	Blighty	J Sutton	Yarroweyah	V Bell	Picola United
1985	L Savage	Blighty	N Savage	Blighty	C Stevens	Waaia
1986	T McIntyre	Barooga	M Millstead	Barooga	D Koch	Yarroweyah
1987	T McIntyre	Barooga	V Bell	Picola United	L Munro	Yarroweyah
1988	M Wilson	Picola United	C Stevens	Waaia	V Vandermeer	Barooga
1989	Tracy Judd	Katunga	A Neilson	Waaia	K Mason	Yarroweyah
1990	C Hargreaves	Yarroweyah	N Case	Blighty	Rachael Cook	Katunga
1991	C Platfuss	Picola United	Marita McLean	Katunga	Tina Ciccone	Katunga
1992	N Case	Blighty	Rachael Cook	Katunga	K Hargreaves	Yarroweyah
1993	Rachel Cook	Katunga	Krista Scott	Katunga	T Hargreaves	Yarroweyah
Year	17 Under	Netball Club	15 Under	Netball Club	13 Under	Netball Club
1994	K McPherson	Yarroweyah	S Kirne	Strathmerton	H Crump	Mathoura
1995	H Morrissey	Picola United	J Tyndell	Waaia	S Good	Yarroweyah
1996	L Maunder	Wunghnu	S Jones	Tungamah	K Bourke	Tungamah
1997	J Tyndell	Waaia	K Trealor	Yarroweyah	R Corry	Picola United
1998	A Chandler	Waaia	M Clump	Picola United	D Maplestone	Yarroweyah
1999	S Jones	Tungamah	C Harris	Katandra	T Hayes	Tungamah
2000	M Clump	Picola United	G Kreek	Tungamah	L Bourke	Tungamah
2001	L O'Shea	Tungamah	F Francis	Mathoura	B Doyle	Katandra
2002	D O'Shea	Tungamah	S Teague	Katandra	M Loe	Strathmerton
2003	S Teague	Katandra	B Doyle	Tungamah	L Stacey	Tungamah
2004	B O'Callaghan	Tungamah	A Gledhil	Katandra	Stacey Hickey	Katunga
					Alex Scoones	Katunga
					Hannah Symes	Tungamah
2005	C Thommers	Deniliquin Rovers	Stephanie Cusack	Katunga	Hannah Symes	Tungamah
2006	S Bond	Tungamah	S Falls	Blighty	J Gall	Dookie United
2007	A Muggeridge	Katamatite	S Falls	Blighty	D Morrison	Picola
2008	K Jones	Yarroweyah	J Platfuss	Blighty	G Ryan	Strathmerton
Picola & DFNL - (Netball): North West & South East Divisions. 2009 to 2017
Year	17 Under	Netball Club	15 Under	Netball Club	13 Under	Netball Club
2009	NW: Rebekah Riordan	Katamatite	Elizabeth Skehan	Katamatite	Grace Byrnes	Picola United
2009	SE: Joanne Hausler &	Blighty	Georgia Ryan &	Strathmerton	Ashleigh Morrison	Katunga
2009	SE: Sarah McCluskey	Mathoura	Alex Wooden	Blighty		
2010	NW: Hannah Rendell	Picola United	Jenna Smith	Mathoura	Kristen Hommes	Berrigan
2010	SE: Elizabeth Skehan	Katamatite	Breanna Olsson	Strathmerton	Abbey Jones &	Tungamah
2010	SE:				Stefany Schier	Picola United
2011	NW: Ella Steinfort	Strathmerton	Monique Bish	Mathoura	Carrisa Holmberg	Deniliquin Rovers
2011	SE: Gemma Thorne	Waaia	Chelsey Thorne	Waaia	Hannah Carner	Katandra
2012	NW: Kiara Cooper	Picola United	Zoe Stephens	Jerilderie	Paige Nash	Jerilderie
2012	SE: Amy Williams	Waaia	Amy Brooks	Waaia	Shania Whitehead	Shepparton East
2013	NW: Demi Blake	Blighty	Paige Nash	Jerilderie	Ruby Pinnuck	Strathmerton
2013	SE: Sophie Harmer	Dookie United	Georgia McCracken	Katunga	Chelsea Batey	Katandra
2014	NW: Kiara Keating	Jerilderie	Chelsea Caughey	Strathmerton	Isobelle Bradford	Jerilderie
2014	SE: Hanna Reynoldson	Dookie United	Summa Trimby	Waaia	Alice Clurey	Katandra
2015	NW: Tyanah Case &	Mathoura	Isobelle Bradford	Jerilderie	Kayla Smith	Blighty
2015	NW: Sophie Lostroh	Blighty				
2015	SE: Georgina McCracken	Katunga	Lexie Kildey	Dookie United	Alice Clurey	Katandra
2016	NW: Jackie Thorpe	Deniliquin Rovers	Grace Leeds	Jerilderie	Jemma Ryan	Strathmerton
2016	SE: Summa Trimby	Waaia	Brylee McCarty	Rennie	Brylee Ash	Katandra
2017	NW: Gracie Reid	Tocumwal	Lille Harford	Blighty	Isabella Jachim	Mathoura
2017	SE: B McCarty	Rennie	Ella Jones	Tungamah	Sophie Wilson	Waaia
Picola & DFNL - (Netball): One Division
Year	17 Under	Netball Club	15 Under	Netball Club	13 Under	Netball Club
2018	Grace Leeds	Jerilderie	Jasmine Banks	Mathoura	Caitlyn Verlin	Katamatite
2019	Edwina Barclay	Deniliquin Rovers	Jasmine Banks	Mathoura	Jessica Hanmer	Blighty
2020	P&DFNL in recess	> COVID-19				
2021	Eloise Walker	Waaia	Kate Westcott	Deniliquin Rovers	Rhani Hendy	Katunga
2022	Demi Hendy	Katunga	Heleena Shaw	Rennie	Demi Rhodes	Rennie
2023	Erica Nicholls	Blighty	Shylee Brown	Tungamah	Lara O'Callaghan	Mathoura
2024	Heleena Shaw	Rennie	Connie Harris	Katandra	Lily Petersen	Blighty
2025	Ashlee Dyson	Strathmerton	Ruby Neesson	Jerilderie	Lara Redden	Deni Rovers
2026	Demi Rhodes	Rennie	Lily Lewis	Rennie	Lara Hercus	Jerilderie

- - NW: North West Division
- - SE: South East Division

== Finals Summary ==
Qualifying and elimination finals
1st qualifying final
1	1st	Home
4	4th	Away
1st elimination final
5	5th	Home
8	8th	Away
2nd elimination final
6	6th	Home
7	7th	Away
2nd qualifying final
2	2nd	Home
3	3rd	Away

Semi-finals
1st semi-Final
Loser of QF1	Home
Winner of EF1	Away
2nd semi-Final
Winner of EF2	Away
Loser of QF2	Home

Preliminary finals
1st Preliminary Final
Winner of QF1	Home
Winner of SF2	Away
2nd Preliminary Final
Winner of SF1	Away
Winner of QF2	Home

Grand final
Grand Final
Winner of PF1
Winner of PF2

=== Week one ===
- 1st qualifying final: 1st ranked team hosts 4th ranked team.
- 2nd qualifying final: 2nd ranked team hosts 3rd ranked team.
- 1st elimination final: 5th ranked team hosts 8th ranked team.
- 2nd elimination final: 6th ranked team hosts 7th ranked team.

The eight finalists are split into two groups for the opening week of the Finals Series. The top four teams have the best chance of winning the premiership and play the two Qualifying Finals. The winners get a bye through to Week Three of the tournament to play home Preliminary Finals, while the losers play home Semi-Finals in Week Two. The bottom four teams play the two Elimination Finals, where the winners advance to Week Two away games and the losers' seasons are over.

=== Week two ===
- 1st semi-final: Loser of 1st QF hosts winner of 1st EF
- 2nd semi-final: Loser of 2nd QF hosts winner of 2nd EF

=== Week three ===
- 1st Preliminary Final: Winner of 1st QF hosts winner of 2nd SF
- 2nd Preliminary Final: Winner of 2nd QF hosts winner of 1st SF

=== Week four ===
- Grand Final: Winner of 1st PF meets Winner of 2nd PF.

== Seasons ==
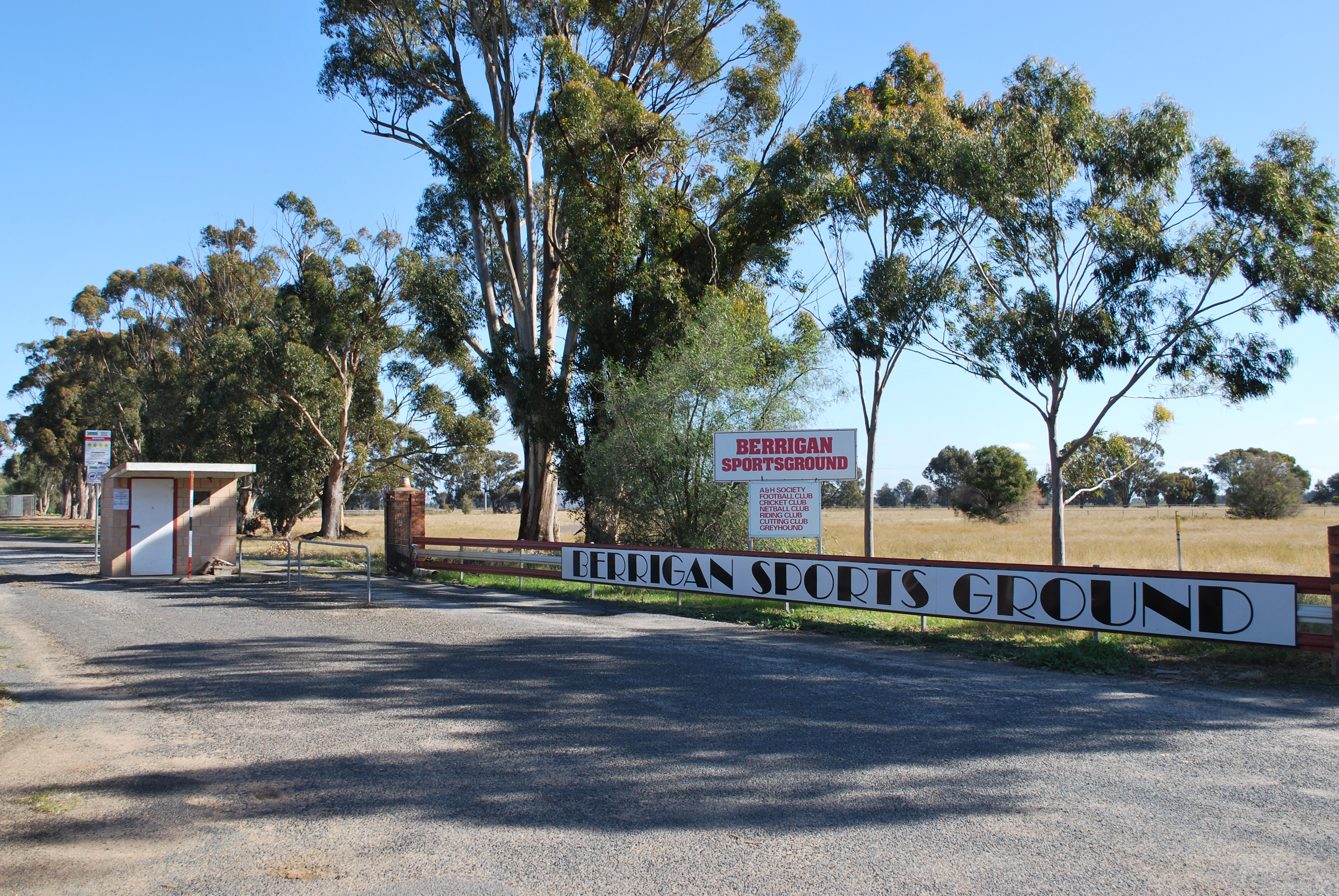
Berrigan Sportsground Gates

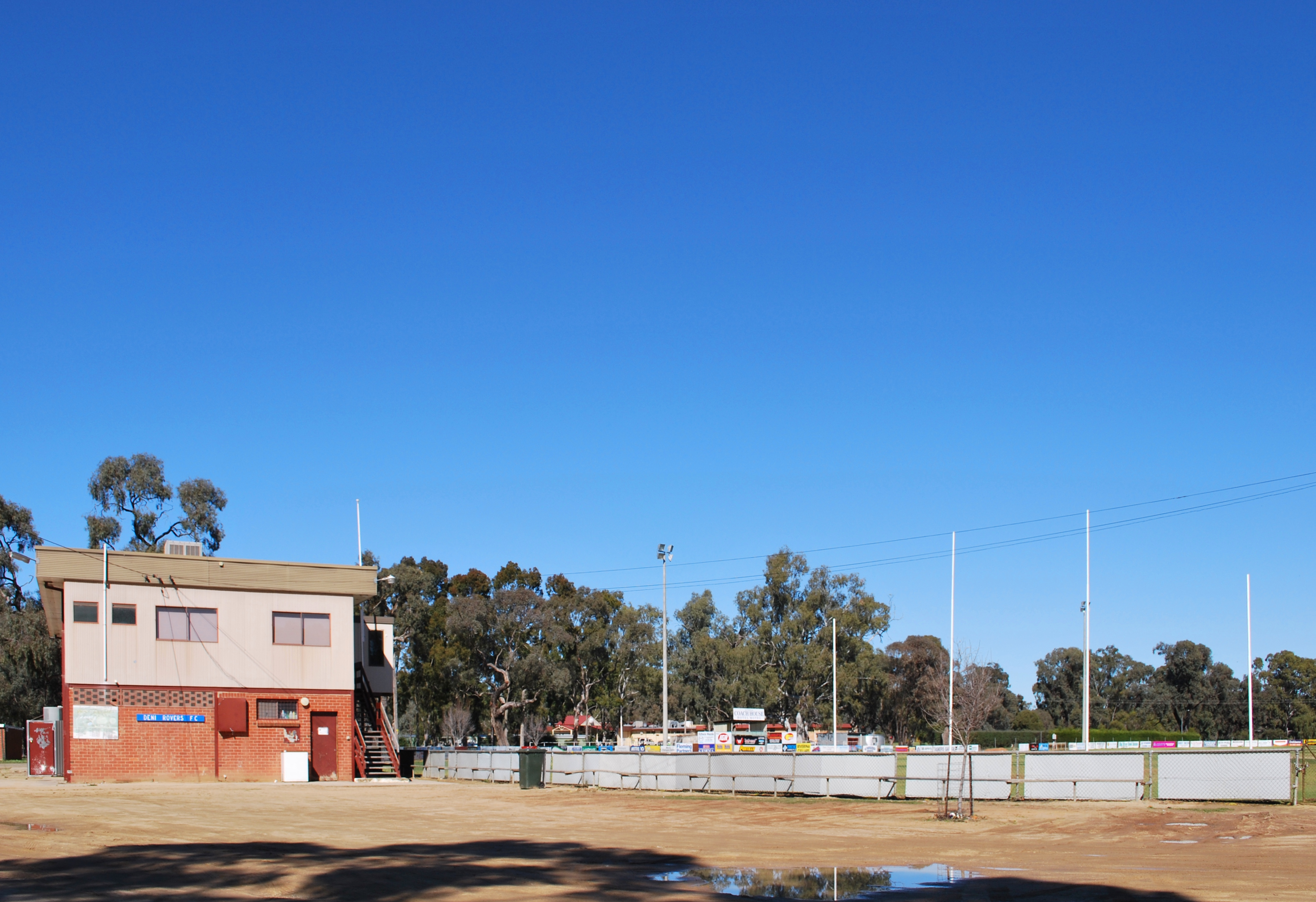
Deniliquin Rovers', Memorial Park Oval

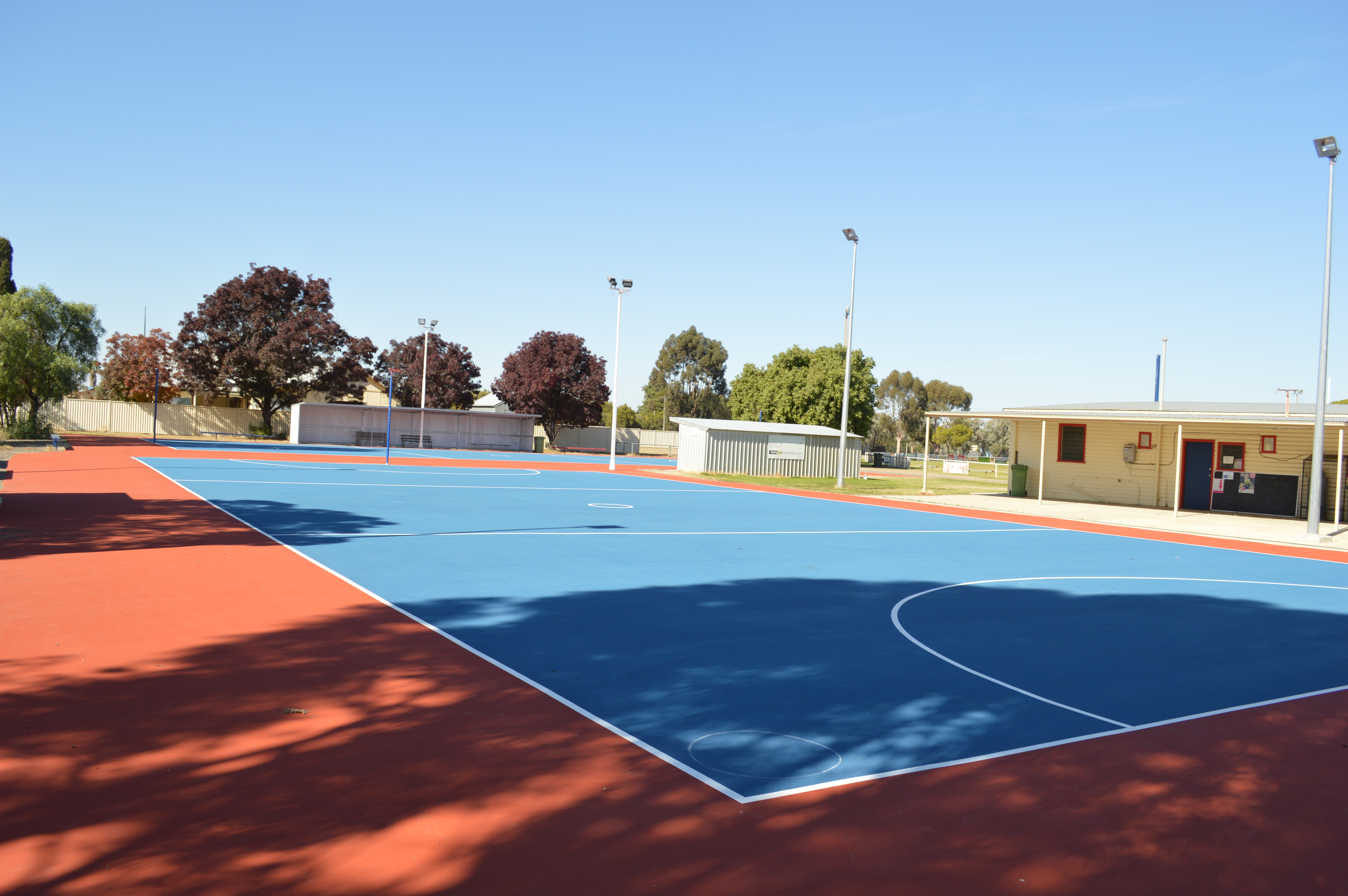
Jerilderie Netball Courts

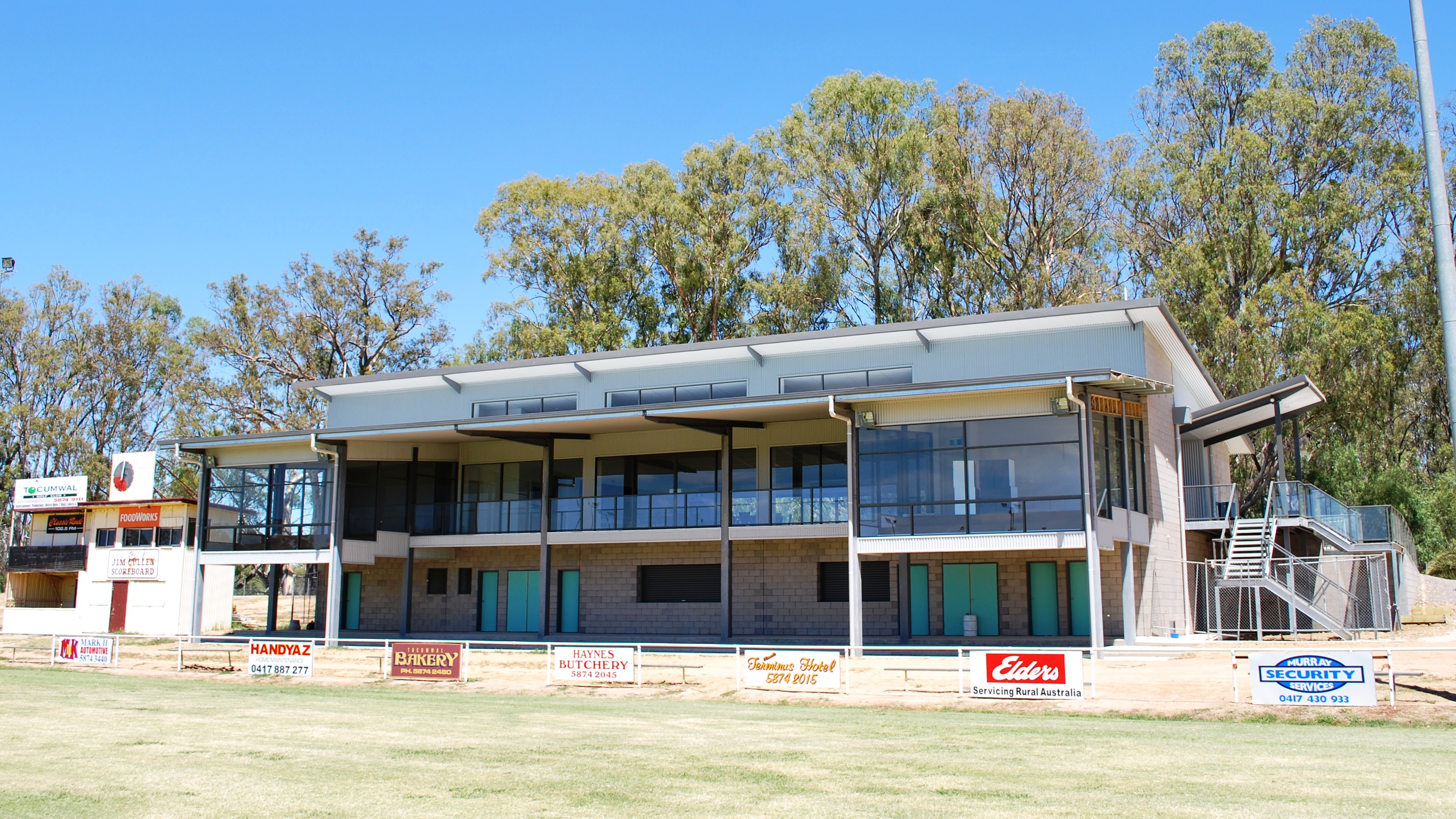
Tocumwal Recreation Reserve Building

=== 2008 season ===
LADDER

Picola District	Wins	Byes	Losses	Draws	For	Against	%	Pts
Tungamah	17	0	0	1	2344	833	281.39%	70
Dookie United	16	0	2	0	2245	1123	199.91%	64
Waaia	15	0	2	1	2267	911	248.85%	62
Katandra	14	0	4	0	2071	1173	176.56%	56
Katunga	13	0	5	0	1832	1225	149.55%	52
Strathmerton	13	0	5	0	1640	1172	139.93%	52
Deniliquin Rovers	12	0	6	0	2022	1453	139.16%	48
Shepparton East	8	0	10	0	1586	1540	102.99%	32
Blighty	8	0	10	0	1380	1554	88.80%	32
Jerilderie	7	0	11	0	1516	1631	92.95%	28
Katamatite	6	0	12	0	1324	1759	75.27%	24
Picola United	6	0	12	0	1225	1711	71.60%	24
Berrigan	5	0	13	0	1151	1678	68.59%	20
Mathoura	2	0	16	0	979	2061	47.50%	8
Yarroweyah	1	0	17	0	748	2709	27.61%	4
Wunghnu	0	0	18	0	679	2476	27.42%	0

FINALS

Final	Team	G	B	Pts	Team	G	B	Pts
Elimination	Katunga	20	10	130	Shepparton East	12	10	82
Elimination	Deniliquin Rovers	12	9	81	Strathmerton	10	5	65
Qualifying	Tungamah	16	12	108	Katandra	11	6	72
Qualifying	Waaia	12	15	87	Dookie United	5	11	41
1st Semi	Dookie United	11	13	79	Katunga	11	10	76
2nd Semi	Katandra	14	8	92	Deniliquin Rovers	5	7	37
Preliminary	Tungamah	20	19	139	Dookie United	8	5	53
Preliminary	Katandra	20	11	131	Waaia	11	10	76
Grand	Tungamah	21	17	143	Katandra	12	10	82

=== 2009 season ===
==== North West Division ====
Picola North West	Wins	Byes	Losses	Draws	For	Against	%	Pts	Final	Team	G	B	Pts	Team	G	B	Pts
Deniliquin Rovers	14	0	2	0	1677	968	173.24%	56	Elimination	Mathoura	8	3	51	Strathmerton	14	12	96
Jerilderie	13	0	3	0	1588	1025	154.93%	52	Qualifying	Jerilderie	22	13	145	Berrigan	8	9	57
Berrigan	11	0	5	0	1354	1100	123.09%	44	1st Semi	Berrigan	11	10	76	Strathmerton	10	7	67
Mathoura	9	0	7	0	1315	1139	115.45%	36	2nd Semi	Deniliquin Rovers	13	13	91	Jerilderie	16	8	104
Strathmerton	8	0	8	0	1219	990	123.13%	32	Preliminary	Berrigan	15	18	108	Deniliquin Rovers	11	7	73
Picola United	6	0	10	0	1169	1183	98.82%	24	Grand	Jerilderie	9	14	68	Berrigan	8	17	65
Yarroweyah	5	0	11	0	1117	1372	81.41%	20									
Blighty	5	0	11	0	1101	1373	80.19%	20									
Wunghnu	1	0	15	0	725	2115	34.28%	4									

==== South East Division ====
Picola South East	Wins	Byes	Losses	Draws	For	Against	%	Pts	Final	Team	G	B	Pts	Team	G	B	Pts
Tungamah	18	0	0	0	2423	1162	208.52%	72	Elimination	Dookie United	20	13	133	Waaia	22	13	145
Katandra	14	0	4	0	1927	1296	148.69%	56	Qualifying	Katandra	18	14	122	Shepparton East	10	14	74
Shepparton East	13	0	5	0	2178	1430	152.31%	52	1st Semi	Shepparton East	15	10	100	Waaia	11	9	75
Dookie United	10	0	8	0	1519	1738	87.40%	40	2nd Semi	Tungamah	18	14	122	Katandra	11	11	77
Waaia	8	0	10	0	1664	1631	102.02%	32	Preliminary	Shepparton East	17	7	109	Katandra	14	12	96
Katamatite	6	0	12	0	1536	1858	82.67%	24	Grand	Tungamah	11	15	81	Shepparton East	5	12	42
Katunga	2	0	16	0	1440	2182	65.99%	8									
Rennie	1	0	17	0	919	2309	39.80%	4									

=== 2010 season ===
==== North West Division ====
Picola North West	Wins	Byes	Losses	Draws	For	Against	%	Pts	Final	Team	G	B	Pts	Team	G	B	Pts
Yarroweyah	13	0	3	0	1645	1087	151.33%	52	Elimination	Strathmerton	8	16	64	Deniliquin Rovers	5	11	41
Mathoura	12	0	3	1	1693	1054	160.63%	50	Qualifying	Berrigan	16	13	109	Mathoura	11	9	75
Berrigan	12	0	4	0	1783	930	191.72%	48	1st Semi	Strathmerton	18	5	113	Mathoura	9	10	64
Strathmerton	11	0	5	0	1582	937	168.84%	44	2nd Semi	Yarroweyah	10	6	66	Berrigan	9	9	63
Deniliquin Rovers	8	0	8	0	1610	1160	138.79%	32	Preliminary	Strathmerton	15	8	98	Berrigan	7	10	52
Jerilderie	6	0	10	0	1468	1415	103.75%	24	Grand	Strathmerton	5	12	42	Yarroweyah	4	4	28
Blighty	6	0	10	0	1271	1265	100.47%	24									
Picola United	3	0	12	1	1483	1412	105.03%	14									
Wunghnu	0	0	16	0	405	3680	11.01%	0									

==== South East Division ====
Picola South East	Wins	Byes	Losses	Draws	For	Against	%	Pts	Final	Team	G	B	Pts	Team	G	B	Pts
Shepparton East	18	0	0	0	2356	1034	227.85%	72	Elimination	Katandra	15	8	98	Rennie	7	13	55
Tungamah	14	0	3	0	2057	1252	164.30%	56	Qualifying	Tungamah	15	9	99	Dookie United	11	7	73
Dookie United	11	0	7	0	1660	1556	106.68%	44	1st Semi	Katandra	19	9	123	Dookie United	11	5	71
Rennie	9	0	9	0	1541	1432	107.61%	36	2nd Semi	Shepparton East	18	14	122	Tungamah	10	8	68
Katandra	9	0	9	0	1626	1807	89.98%	36	Preliminary	Tungamah	11	14	80	Katandra	4	12	36
Katamatite	7	0	10	0	1371	1611	85.10%	28	Grand	Shepparton East	17	13	115	Tungamah	10	7	67
Waaia	2	0	16	0	1119	1777	62.97%	8									
Katunga	1	0	17	0	1048	2309	45.39%	4									

=== 2011 season ===
==== North West Division ====
Picola North West	Wins	Byes	Losses	Draws	For	Against	%	Pts	Final	Team	G	B	Pts	Team	G	B	Pts
Jerilderie	16	0	1	1	1938	1086	178.45%	66	Elimination	Blighty	14	11	95	Deniliquin Rovers	13	9	87
Mathoura	12	0	6	0	1540	1350	114.07%	48	Qualifying	Berrigan	14	7	91	Mathoura	11	7	73
Berrigan	10	0	7	1	1737	1446	120.12%	42	1st Semi	Mathoura	14	10	94	Blighty	12	21	93
Blighty	9	0	9	0	1452	1586	91.55%	36	2nd Semi	Jerilderie	16	12	108	Berrigan	7	5	47
Deniliquin Rovers	9	0	9	0	1630	1783	91.42%	36	Preliminary	Berrigan	18	13	121	Mathoura	14	9	93
Yarroweyah	8	0	10	0	1481	1566	94.57%	32	Grand	Berrigan	16	6	102	Jerilderie	10	11	71
Strathmerton	5	0	13	0	1345	1594	84.38%	20									
Picola United	2	0	16	0	1256	1968	63.82%	8									

==== South East Division ====
Picola South East	Wins	Byes	Losses	Draws	For	Against	%	Pts	Final	Team	G	B	Pts	Team	G	B	Pts
Shepparton East	16	0	2	0	2309	1266	182.39%	64	Elimination	Tungamah	13	22	100	Dookie United	8	16	64
Rennie	12	0	6	0	1890	1192	158.56%	48	Qualifying	Rennie	18	6	114	Waaia	14	4	88
Waaia	12	0	6	0	1914	1216	157.40%	48	1st Semi	Tungamah	12	7	79	Waaia	11	12	78
Tungamah	11	0	7	0	2031	1534	132.40%	44	2nd Semi	Rennie	18	9	117	Shepparton East	13	6	84
Dookie United	9	0	9	0	1653	1745	94.73%	36	Preliminary	Shepparton East	14	17	101	Tungamah	9	5	59
Katandra	6	0	12	0	1591	1672	95.16%	24	Grand	Rennie	11	7	73	Shepparton East	9	8	62
Katunga	6	0	12	0	1389	1948	71.30%	24									
Katamatite	0	0	18	0	638	2842	22.45%	0									

=== 2012 season ===
==== North West Division ====
Picola North West	Wins	Byes	Losses	Draws	For	Against	%	Pts	Final	Team	G	B	Pts	Team	G	B	Pts
Blighty	16	0	2	0	2086	1288	161.96%	64	Elimination	Jerilderie	24	14	158	Strathmerton	8	10	58
Berrigan	14	0	4	0	2067	1144	180.68%	56	Qualifying	Berrigan	16	12	108	Deniliquin Rovers	9	15	69
Deniliquin Rovers	12	0	6	0	1942	1464	132.65%	48	1st Semi	Jerilderie	14	17	101	Deniliquin Rovers	11	8	74
Jerilderie	11	0	7	0	1856	1232	150.65%	44	2nd Semi	Berrigan	15	12	102	Blighty	10	10	70
Strathmerton	11	0	7	0	1928	1284	150.16%	44	Preliminary	Jerilderie	16	10	106	Blighty	10	15	75
Yarroweyah	5	0	13	0	1495	1802	82.96%	20	Grand	Jerilderie	19	16	130	Berrigan	12	9	81
Picola United	3	0	15	0	1066	1900	56.11%	12									
Mathoura	0	0	18	0	564	2890	19.52%	0									

==== South East Division ====
Picola South East	Wins	Byes	Losses	Draws	For	Against	%	Pts	Final	Team	G	B	Pts	Team	G	B	Pts
Shepparton East	16	0	2	0	1995	1193	167.23%	64	Elimination	Tungamah	16	19	115	Dookie United	14	12	96
Rennie	13	0	5	0	1999	1271	157.28%	52	Qualifying	Waaia	14	7	91	Rennie	13	7	85
Waaia	13	0	5	0	2044	1394	146.63%	52	1st Semi	Rennie	26	8	164	Tungamah	10	14	74
Tungamah	10	0	8	0	1659	1642	101.04%	40	2nd Semi	Shepparton East	18	14	122	Waaia	14	10	94
Dookie United	6	0	12	0	1396	1793	77.86%	24	Preliminary	Waaia	14	14	98	Rennie	10	16	76
Katamatite	5	0	13	0	1412	2005	70.42%	20	Grand	Shepparton East	14	16	100	Waaia	11	8	74
Katunga	5	0	13	0	1299	1909	68.05%	20									
Katandra	4	0	14	0	1248	1845	67.64%	16									

=== 2013 season ===
==== North West Division ====
Picola North West	Wins	Byes	Losses	Draws	For	Against	%	Pts	Final	Team	G	B	Pts	Team	G	B	Pts
Jerilderie	16	0	2	0	2852	896	318.30%	64	Elimination	Blighty	18	13	121	Berrigan	12	3	75
Strathmerton	14	0	4	0	2497	1203	207.56%	56	Qualifying	Strathmerton	29	15	189	Deniliquin Rovers	15	8	98
Deniliquin Rovers	12	0	6	0	1856	1352	137.28%	48	1st Semi	Blighty	15	11	101	Deniliquin Rovers	14	15	99
Berrigan	12	0	6	0	1768	1484	119.14%	48	2nd Semi	Jerilderie	16	16	112	Strathmerton	14	11	95
Blighty	10	0	8	0	1896	1376	137.79%	40	Preliminary	Strathmerton	22	14	146	Blighty	7	14	56
Picola United	6	0	12	0	1567	1546	101.36%	24	Grand	Jerilderie	18	10	118	Strathmerton	11	10	76
Mathoura	2	0	16	0	913	2852	32.01%	8									
Yarroweyah	0	0	18	0	553	3193	17.32%	0									

==== South East Division ====
Picola South East	Wins	Byes	Losses	Draws	For	Against	%	Pts	Final	Team	G	B	Pts	Team	G	B	Pts
Tungamah	17	0	1	0	2368	1021	231.93%	68	Elimination	Dookie United	12	9	81	Rennie	4	9	33
Waaia	13	0	5	0	1990	1219	163.25%	52	Qualifying	Waaia	17	6	108	Shepparton East	9	9	63
Shepparton East	10	0	8	0	1689	1344	125.67%	40	1st Semi	Dookie United	10	11	71	Shepparton East	8	9	57
Dookie United	10	0	8	0	1473	1340	109.93%	40	2nd Semi	Tungamah	19	11	125	Waaia	10	9	69
Rennie	9	0	9	0	1361	1398	97.35%	36	Preliminary	Waaia	14	14	98	Dookie United	11	8	74
Katamatite	8	0	10	0	1424	1784	79.82%	32	Grand	Tungamah	17	20	122	Waaia	15	6	96
Katunga	5	0	13	0	1375	1594	86.26%	20									
Katandra	0	0	18	0	569	2549	22.32%	0									

=== 2014 season ===
==== North West Division ====
Picola North West	Wins	Byes	Losses	Draws	For	Against	%	Pts	Final	Team	G	B	Pts	Team	G	B	Pts
Jerilderie	15	2	1	0	2245	762	294.62%	60	Elimination	Berrigan	15	13	103	Blighty	9	5	59
Strathmerton	15	2	1	0	2211	837	264.16%	60	Qualifying	Strathmerton	17	14	116	Tocumwal	9	6	60
Tocumwal	10	2	6	0	1595	1049	152.05%	40	1st Semi	Berrigan	13	15	93	Tocumwal	11	13	79
Blighty	9	2	7	0	1436	1254	114.51%	36	2nd Semi	Jerilderie	18	12	120	Strathmerton	15	8	98
Berrigan	8	2	7	1	1188	1419	83.72%	34	Preliminary	Strathmerton	32	17	209	Berrigan	6	7	43
Mathoura	5	2	11	0	1064	1615	65.88%	20	Grand	Jerilderie	22	15	147	Strathmerton	13	8	86
Picola United	4	2	11	1	1031	1584	65.09%	18									
Yarroweyah	4	2	12	0	1007	1752	57.48%	16									
Deniliquin Rovers	1	2	15	0	573	2078	27.57%	4									

==== South East Division ====
Picola South East	Wins	Byes	Losses	Draws	For	Against	%	Pts	Final	Team	G	B	Pts	Team	G	B	Pts
Tungamah	18	0	0	0	2516	861	292.22%	72	Elimination	Katandra	13	11	89	Shepparton East	6	5	41
Katamatite	10	0	8	0	1580	1399	112.94%	40	Qualifying	Katamatite	16	14	110	Rennie	8	7	55
Rennie	10	0	8	0	1319	1398	94.35%	40	1st Semi	Katandra	12	9	81	Rennie	10	7	67
Shepparton East	8	0	9	1	1260	1498	84.11%	34	2nd Semi	Tungamah	19	22	136	Katamatite	10	12	72
Katandra	8	0	10	0	1295	1532	84.53%	32	Preliminary	Katamatite	20	19	139	Katandra	7	12	54
Katunga	7	0	11	0	1184	1443	82.05%	28	Grand	Tungamah	24	14	158	Katamatite	8	4	52
Waaia	5	0	12	1	1190	1623	73.32%	22									
Dookie United	5	0	13	0	1121	1711	65.52%	20									

=== 2015 Ladder ===
==== North West Division ====
Picola North West	Wins	Byes	Losses	Draws	For	Against	%	Pts	Final	Team	G	B	Pts	Team	G	B	Pts
Strathmerton	14	2	2	0	2015	741	271.93%	56	Elimination	Tocumwal	16	10	106	Berrigan	8	5	53
Jerilderie	14	2	2	0	2071	1016	203.84%	56	Qualifying	Jerilderie	10	14	74	Picola United	7	10	52
Picola United	13	2	3	0	1411	946	149.15%	52	1st Semi	Tocumwal	19	9	123	Picola United	14	11	95
Tocumwal	8	2	7	1	1438	1270	113.23%	34	2nd Semi	Strathmerton	18	13	121	Jerilderie	8	12	60
Berrigan	8	2	8	0	1174	1264	92.88%	32	Preliminary	Jerilderie	13	10	88	Tocumwal	8	11	59
Mathoura	7	2	9	0	1189	1457	81.61%	28	Grand	Strathmerton	12	13	85	Jerilderie	10	9	69
Blighty	4	2	12	0	986	1461	67.49%	16									
Deniliquin Rovers	2	2	13	1	870	1560	55.77%	10									
Yarroweyah	1	2	15	0	792	2231	35.50%	4									

==== South East Division ====
Picola South East	Wins	Byes	Losses	Draws	For	Against	%	Pts	Final	Team	G	B	Pts	Team	G	B	Pts
Tungamah	18	0	0	0	3076	773	397.93%	72	Elimination	Dookie United	16	12	108	Katamatite	6	4	40
Waaia	15	0	3	0	2224	1050	211.81%	60	Qualifying	Waaia	21	9	135	Shepparton East	5	9	39
Shepparton East	13	0	5	0	1662	1165	142.66%	52	1st Semi	Shepparton East	13	12	90	Dookie United	11	6	72
Dookie United	11	0	7	0	1439	1547	93.02%	44	2nd Semi	Tungamah	25	22	172	Waaia	10	8	68
Katamatite	6	0	12	0	1128	2162	52.17%	24	Preliminary	Waaia	15	14	104	Shepparton East	15	11	101
Katandra	5	0	13	0	1343	1700	79.00%	20	Grand	Tungamah	19	9	123	Waaia	9	11	65
Katunga	4	0	14	0	1120	1970	56.85%	16									
Rennie	0	0	18	0	793	2418	32.80%	0									

=== 2016 Ladder ===
==== North West Division ====
Picola North West	Wins	Byes	Losses	Draws	For	Against	%	Pts	Final	Team	G	B	Pts	Team	G	B	Pts
Picola United	15	0	1	0	1894	658	287.84%	60	Elimination	Blighty	14	17	101	Deniliquin Rovers	13	8	86
Berrigan	12	0	4	0	1397	1134	123.19%	48	Qualifying	Strathmerton	14	10	94	Berrigan	9	9	63
Strathmerton	11	0	5	0	1559	904	172.46%	44	1st Semi	Berrigan	13	9	87	Blighty	10	14	74
Blighty	10	0	5	1	1541	1070	144.02%	42	2nd Semi	Picola United	16	17	113	Strathmerton	7	4	46
Deniliquin Rovers	10	0	6	0	1291	1043	123.78%	40	Preliminary	Strathmerton	14	10	94	Berrigan	9	9	63
Tocumwal	6	0	9	1	1234	1270	97.17%	26	Grand	Picola United	17	6	108	Strathmerton	5	2	32
Jerilderie	4	0	12	0	865	1727	50.09%	16									
Mathoura	2	0	14	0	962	1635	58.84%	8									
Yarroweyah	1	0	15	0	817	2119	38.56%	4									

==== South East Division ====
Picola South East	Wins	Byes	Losses	Draws	For	Against	%	Pts	Final	Team	G	B	Pts	Team	G	B	Pts
Shepparton East	18	0	0	0	2099	920	228.15%	72	Elimination	Katunga	16	9	105	Katandra	11	5	71
Waaia	14	0	4	0	2054	1147	179.08%	56	Qualifying	Tungamah	14	8	92	Waaia	13	10	88
Tungamah	13	0	5	0	1887	1349	139.88%	52	1st Semi	Katunga	18	7	115	Waaia	14	11	95
Katunga	10	0	8	0	1539	1327	115.98%	40	2nd Semi	Shepparton East	17	15	117	Tungamah	10	12	72
Katandra	8	0	10	0	1461	1297	112.64%	32	Preliminary	Tungamah	15	11	101	Katunga	12	10	82
Katamatite	5	0	13	0	1400	1484	94.34%	20	Grand	Shepparton East	10	14	74	Tungamah	7	9	51
Dookie United	4	0	14	0	1106	1760	62.84%	16									
Rennie	0	0	18	0	486	2748	17.69%	0									

=== 2017 Ladder ===
==== North West Division ====
Picola North West	Wins	Byes	Losses	Draws	For	Against	%	Pts	Final	Team	G	B	Pts	Team	G	B	Pts
Picola United	15	0	1	0	1926	691	278.73%	60	Elimination	Berrigan	16	8	104	Tocumwal	12	7	79
Strathmerton	14	0	2	0	1793	784	228.70%	56	Qualifying	Strathmerton	16	10	106	Blighty	4	11	35
Blighty	12	0	4	0	1701	902	188.58%	48	1st Semi	Blighty	13	9	87	Berrigan	9	8	62
Tocumwal	10	0	6	0	1542	1099	140.31%	40	2nd Semi	Picola United	18	8	116	Strathmerton	10	7	67
Berrigan	8	0	8	0	1565	1154	135.62%	32	Preliminary	Strathmerton	11	11	77	Blighty	10	11	71
Deniliquin Rovers	7	0	9	0	1400	1203	116.38%	28	Grand	Picola United	11	4	70	Strathmerton	7	10	52
Jerilderie	4	0	12	0	1074	1835	58.53%	16									
Mathoura	2	0	14	0	826	1987	41.57%	8									
Yarroweyah	0	0	16	0	516	2688	19.20%	0									

==== South East Division ====
Picola South East	Wins	Byes	Losses	Draws	For	Against	%	Pts	Final	Team	G	B	Pts	Team	G	B	Pts
Tungamah	15	0	3	0	2244	1111	201.98%	60	Elimination	Waaia	22	19	151	Katunga	3	10	28
Shepparton East	15	0	3	0	1991	1116	178.41%	60	Qualifying	Rennie	18	12	120	Shepparton East	13	6	84
Rennie	13	0	5	0	1794	1098	163.39%	52	1st Semi	Shepparton East	11	14	80	Waaia	9	13	67
Waaia	10	0	8	0	1517	1389	109.22%	40	2nd Semi	Tungamah	12	15	87	Rennie	11	7	73
Katunga	8	0	10	0	1295	1533	84.47%	32	Preliminary	Rennie	17	8	110	Shepparton East	10	13	73
Dookie United	6	0	12	0	1063	1640	64.82%	24	Grand	Rennie	11	9	75	Tungamah	9	8	62
Katamatite	4	0	14	0	1058	2094	50.53%	16									
Katandra	1	0	17	0	852	1833	46.48%	4									

- Picola & DFNL Ladders from 2018 to 2024.
