= Waaia Football Club =

Waaia FNC

Names
- Full name: Waaia Football Netball Club
- Nickname(s): Bombers

2024 season
- After finals: Premiers
- Home-and-away season: 3rd
- Leading goalkicker: Charlie Burrows (87)
- Best and fairest: Jesse Trower

Club details
- Founded: 1893; 132 years ago
- Colours: Red & Black
- Competition: Picola & District
- Coach: Mitch Cleeland
- Ground(s): Waaia Recreation Reserve, McDonald St. (capacity: 5,000)

Uniforms
Home

Other information
- Official website: Waaia FNC website

The Waaia Football Netball Club, nicknamed the Bombers, is an Australian rules football and netball club playing in the Picola & District Football League. The club is based in the small Victorian town of Waaia, approximately 220 km from Melbourne.

== History ==
The first published football match for "Waaia Football Club" was in August 1893 when Nathalia defeated Waaia at Nathalia, while the first published club meeting took place in 1895. Over the next couple of decades the club only competed in the Goulburn Valley Football Association in between some periods of being in recess.

Waaia were runner up to Mucatah in the 1900 Goulburn Valley Football Association premiership.

In 1915, Waaia FC applied to join the GVFA, but were refused.

In 1930, Jim Grinter and Fred Jorgenson called a meeting to reform the Waaia FC, but it appears the club did not reform.

In 1935, the club commenced an involvement in the Picola & District Football League that continues to this day. Waaia's first premiership was won in 1953.

Its 1990 premiership is folklore in the district with Mick Cleeland's 50 metre torpedo goal giving the Bombers a come-from-behind victory after the final siren had sounded. Footage of the event can be viewed via this link.

Chaos reigned following his goal as officials tried to unravel what had happened. The main issue being that the score board only showed the goals and behinds and not the total score...creating confusion as to who had won. Added to all this was irony of the goal kicker...Mick Cleeland. When then coach Mick Power took over the reins in 1988 he inherited a talented but undisciplined team that needed to learn team play. He immediately banned the use of the torpedo as it was selfish and inaccurate. Players who persisted in kicking 'torps' were benched. The most common culprit of the rule was Mick Cleeland. However, after the awards ceremony on the ground of the 1990 grand final win the team retreated to the change rooms to sing the club song whereupon Mick Power stopped everyone and yelled," I love torpedoes!"

The Bombers followed this thrill up in 1991 with an even better season where they were 1st XVIII premiers and champions as well as 2nd XVIII premiers. This was followed by the theft of the premiership cup during post game celebrations at the Waaia Hotel. The cup went missing for over a week making local and state news services. It was returned, undamaged, a fortnight later by one of the premiership players whose mates had taken it back to Melbourne as a memento of the trip. Whilst it was away the cup featured at a number of barbecues and other AFL grand final celebrations where attendees had their photo taken in the traditional styles of opposing captains shaking hands or premiership captain holding cup aloft. The 'stolen cup' story is now folklore in the town and each time the players who returned the cup visits the club he is reminded of the event.

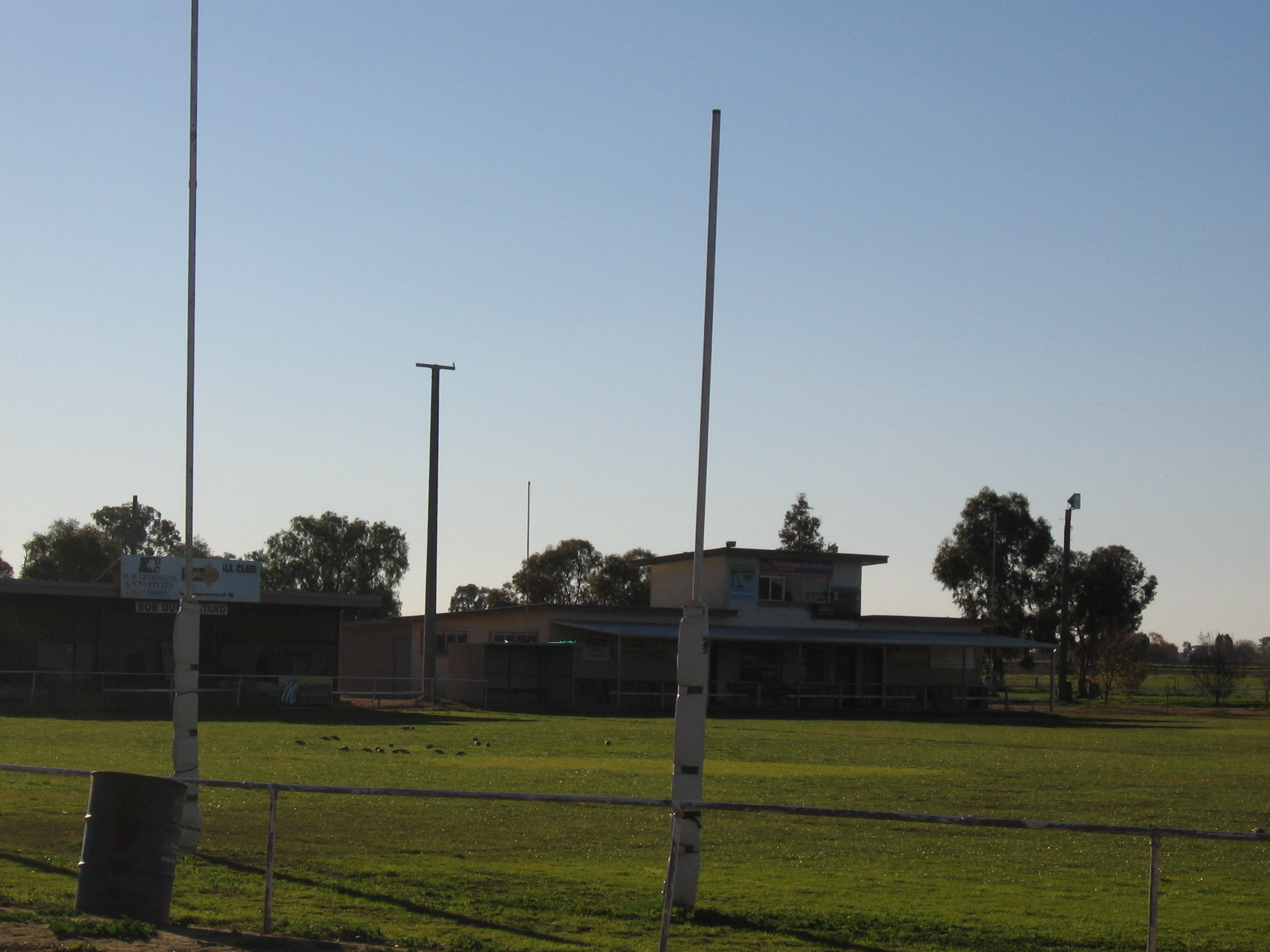
Waaia Football Ground

== Football Timeline ==
- 1894 - 1901: Goulburn Valley Football Association
- 1902 - 1905: Club in recess.
- 1906 - 1908: Goulburn Valley Football Association
- 1909 - 1910: Club in recess
- 1911 - Goulburn Valley Football Association
- 1912 - 1920: Club in recess.
- 1921 - 1922: Goulburn Valley Football Association
- 1923 - 1934: Club in recess.
- 1935 - 1940: Picola & District Football League. Waaia FC reformed in 1935.
- 1941 - 1945: Club in recess due to World War Two
- 1946 - 2025: Picola & District Football League

== Football Premierships ==
Seniors

- Picola & District Football League (13):
  - 1953, 1974, 1989, 1990, 1991, 1992, 1994, 1995, 2002, 2005, 2022, 2023, 2024

Reserves

- Picola & District Football League (5):
  - 1985, 1990, 1991, 1992, 1994

Thirds

?

Fourths

?

== VFL / AFL players ==
- 1989 - Anthony Stevens - North Melbourne
- 1992 - Gary Stevens - Sydney
- 1995 - Glen Coghlan - St Kilda
- 1999 - Michael Stevens - (Port Adelaide and North Melbourne)
