= Picola United Football Club =

Picola United

Names
- Full name: Picola United Football Club
- Nickname: Blues

Club details
- Founded: 1971; 55 years ago
- Colours: blue white
- Competition: Picola & District
- President: Clinton Barnes
- Coach: 2025 - Football: Rhys Woodland Netball: Annie Jorgensen
- Premierships: 1
- Ground: Picola Recreation Reserve

Uniforms
Home

The Picola United Football Netball Club, nicknamed the Blues, is an Australian rules football and netball club playing in the Picola & District Football League. The club is based in the small Victorian town of Picola.

== History ==
The club was founded as a merger between Picola Football Club and Yalca North Football Club in 1971.

== Premierships ==
=== Picola Football Club ===
League	Total flags	Senior Football Premierships
Picola & District Football Association	2	1906, 1907
Western & Moira Football Association	2	1908, 1914
Picola & District Football League	8	1935, 1949, 1952, 1954, 1955, 1956, 1962, 1967

=== Yalca North Football Club ===
League	Total flags	Premiership year(s)
Picola & District Football League	1	1939

=== Picola United Football Club ===
League	Total flags	Premiership year(s)
Picola & District Football League	2	2016 & 2017

Reserves

?

Thirds

?

Fourths

?

== League Best and Fairest Winners ==
Senior Football

- Picola & District Football League
  - Yalca North
    - 1937 - D Smith
- Picola & District Football League
  - Picola Football Club
    - 1963, 1964, 1965, (2nd: 1966), 1967 - David McKenzie
- Picola & District Football League - Pearce Medal
  - Picola United Football Club
    - 2005, 2006 - Adam Brunt
    - 2016 - David Daniel
    - 2018 - Mark Ryan
