= Gary Stevens (Australian rules footballer) =

Australian rules footballer

Garry Stevens

Personal information
- Full name: Garry Stevens
- Born: 10 October 1972 (age 54)
- Original team: Waaia
- Draft: 96th, 1989 National Draft
- Height: 168 cm (5 ft 6 in)
- Weight: 69 kg (152 lb)

Playing career^{1}
Years	Club	Games (Goals)
1992–1993	Sydney Swans	5 (1)
- ^{1} Playing statistics correct to the end of 1993.

Garry Stevens (born 10 October 1972) is a former Australian rules footballer who played with the Sydney Swans in the Australian Football League (AFL).

Stevens was the second member of a Waaia family to play in the AFL, after his elder brother Anthony. A third brother, Michael, also played in the league.

He won a Morrish Medal in the 1991 AFL Under 19s Competition, the last before the formation of the TAC Cup.

In the 1992 AFL season, Stevens made four senior appearances. Sydney lost all four of those games as well as the only other game he played in 1993, meaning he never got to celebrate a win while with the Swans.

He later played for Tatura in the Goulburn Valley Football Netball League.
