= Blighty Football Club =

Blighty FNC

Names
- Full name: Blighty Football Netball Club
- Nickname(s): Redeyes

Club details
- Founded: 1949; 76 years ago
- Colours: red white
- Competition: Picola & District
- President: Michael Norman
- Coach: Brad 'McClutchy' Haines
- Premierships: 1965, 1969, 1971, 1975, 2000
- Ground(s): Blighty Recreational Reserve

Uniforms
Home

Other information
- Official website: Blighty FNC website

The Blighty Football Netball Club, nicknamed the Redeyes, is an Australian rules football and netball club playing in the Picola & District Football League.

The club is based in the Riverina locality of Blighty, New South Wales.

== History ==
The club was formed in 1949 and initially played on the club President's paddock.

== Timeline ==
- 1949 - 1954: Edward River Football Association
- 1955 - 1958: Murray Football League
- 1959 - 1961: Edward River Football Association
- 1962 - 1963: Murray Football League
- 1964 - 1968: Coreen & District Football League
- 1969 - 2025: Picola & District Football League

== Football Premierships ==
Seniors

League	Timeframe	Total Flags	Premiership Year(s)
Edward River Football Association	1949 - 54, 1959 - 61	0	
Coreen & District Football League	1964 - 68	1	1965
Picola & District Football League	1969–Present	4	1969, 1971, 1975, 2000

Reserves

- ?

Thirds

- 1971

Fourths

- ?

== Netball Premierships ==
A. Grade

- 1974, 1975, 1999,

B. Grade

- 2002,

C. Grade

C. Reserve

Under 17's

Under 15's

- 1985, 2004, 2007, 2008

Under 13's

- 2008
