= Mathoura Football Club =

Mathoura

Names
- Full name: Mathoura Football Netball Club
- Nickname: Timbercutters

Club details
- Founded: 1909; 117 years ago
- Colours
- Competition: Picola & District
- President: Blake Keech
- Ground: Mathoura Recreation Reserve

Uniforms
Home

The Mathoura Football Netball Club, nicknamed the Timbercutters, is an Australian rules football and netball club The club based in the small New South Wales town of Mathoura. Their teams currently play in the Picola & District Football League.

== History ==
Mathoura played in the Deniliquin Football Association and won four consecutive premierships between 1920 and 1923.

In 1929, Mathoura were runners up to Kyabram in the Northern Goulburn Football Association.

== Football Premierships ==
Seniors

- 1920
- 1921
- 1922
- 1923
- 1929
- 1936
- 1937
- 1938
- 1949
- 1952
- 1961
- 1973
- 1976
- 1984
- 1986
- 1993

Reserves
Thirds

1991 1992 2020 2021 2022 2023

Fourths

== 2009 Season Review ==
The 2009 Season was particularly special for Mathoura as 5 out of 8 netball teams won Premierships. A Grade and B Grade were both comfortable winners whereas C Grade, C Reserve and the Under 13s had to go into extra time and then had to win by two goals once extra time had expired. Both Senior and Reserve Football squads made their first finals appearances for many years. The Seniors were defeated in the Elimination Final against Strathmerton and the Reserves were defeated by Jerilderie in the First Semi Final held at Mathoura. Nineteen-year-old Reserves on-baller Matthew Sparey won the McKenzie Medal, which is the League Best and Fairest as voted by the umpires.

The Senior and Reserve football squads both backed up their 2009 season by finishing 2nd and 1st on the competition ladder respectively. The Senior team were edged out of top position on the ladder by Yarroweyah as a result of a drawn game against Picola late in the Home and Away season. The Seniors were defeated in 'straight sets' in the finals, losing to Berrigan in the Qualifying Final then Strathmerton in the First Semi Final. The Reserve team defeated Picola United in the Second Semi Final, but were defeated by Picola United two weeks later in the Grand Final on a miserable day. The A Grade netball team won back-to-back premierships.

== 2010 Season Review ==
Individual Highlights from the 2010 Season included Brodie Lumber winning the Senior League Goalkicking with 70 goals, Martin McKenzie winning the Reserves League Goalkicking with 76 goals as well as coming Runner-Up in the McKenzie Medal.

A Grade Netballer Shelley Wilson won the League Best and Fairest and Under 15 Netballer Jenna Smith won the League Best and Fairest.

== Mathoura Best & Fairest Awards ==
Senior Football

- 2018 – Andrew Evans
- 2019 – Jake Ellery

== League Best & Fairest Awards ==
Senior Football

- Edward River Football Association
  - Neil Sinclair
- Picola & District Football League
  - 1990 - Chris Duggan

Reserves Football

- Picola & District Football League
  - 2019 - Matthew Sparey
  - 2004 - Andrew Simson
