= List of Australian rules footballers who died during their careers =

This is a list of Australian rules football players who have died either during their respective playing careers or due to career-ending injury or disease incurred during their playing career. It includes both on-field and off-field deaths. People who had announced their retirement from playing despite still being at an age when they could still have been active, or who only continued to play in low-level amateur or exhibition matches are not listed.

== Off-field deaths ==
Player	Age	Club	Competition	Cause of death	Year
Jack Allister	27	North Melbourne	VFL	pneumonia	1946
Dave Barry	24	North Fremantle (formerly South Melbourne)	WAFL (formerly VFL)	run over by a train	1913
Rhett Baynes	25	Perth (formerly Carlton)	WAFL (formerly VFL)	suicide (overdose)	1990
Troy Broadbridge	24	Melbourne	AFL	drowning (2004 Asian tsunami)	2004
Norm Collins	29	Hawthorn (formerly Fitzroy and Carlton)	VFL	suicide (hanging)	1933
Peter Crimmins	28	Hawthorn	VFL	cancer (testicular)	1976
Bill Eastick	26	South Melbourne	VFL	illness	1914
Jock Fahey	24	Numurkah (formerly South Melbourne)	MFNL (formerly VFL)	struck by motor vehicle	1936
Ted Fleming	23	University (formerly Melbourne)	VFL	sudden illness	1909
Arthur Fox	29	Rupanyup (formerly South Melbourne)	WFL (formerly VFL)	motorcycle accident	1953
Ray Gibb	24	Richmond	VFL	motorcycle accident	1953
Brian Gilmore	26	Footscray	VFL	car accident	1959
Wayne Gordon	29	Collingwood, Melbourne	VFL	cancer (Hodgkin's lymphoma)	1983
Ron James	19	Footscray	AFL	waterskiing accident	1990
Nick Lowden	23	Norwood	SANFL	Suicide	2023
Doug Magor	21	Footscray	VFL	car accident	1969
Michael Mascoulis	20	Port Melbourne (former West Coast rookie)	VFL (formerly AFL)	car accident	2013
John McCarthy	22	Port Adelaide	AFL	accidental fall in Las Vegas	2012
Dinny McKay	29	South Melbourne	VFL	peritonitis (from burst appendix)	1897
Darren Millane	26	Collingwood	AFL	car accident	1991
Dan Moriarty	28	Melbourne	VFL	railway accident	1903
Richard Nixon	26	Warrnambool (formerly Richmond)	HFNL (formerly AFL)	car accident	1992
Terry Ogden	23	Carlton	VFL	pleurisy	1935
Max Orr	24	Ballarat (formerly Melbourne)	BFL (formerly VFL)	car accident	1955
Arthur Pearce	21	St Kilda	VFL	typhoid fever	1902
Harry Pears	34	Port Melbourne (formerly Collingwood)	VFA (formerly VFL)	unknown, may have been on-field	1912
Fred Phillips	27	Hawthorn	VFL	blood poisoning	1933
Bruce Reid	20	South Melbourne	VFL	car accident	1970
Maurie Sankey	25	Carlton	VFL	car accident	1965
Jack Sexton	35	Norwood	SANFL	pleurisy	1935
Jeremy Silcock	26	East Perth (formerly North Melbourne)	WAFL (formerly AFL)	drowning in Bali	1996
Phoenix Spicer	23	Hoppers Crossing (formerly North Melbourne)	WFNL (formerly AFL)	brain aneurysm	2026
Jim Stewart	24	North Melbourne	VFL	appendicitis	1942
Denis Strauch	28	Port Melbourne (formerly Carlton)	VFA (formerly VFL)	tetanus	1965
Jamie Tape	28	Woodville-West Torrens (formerly Richmond and Collingwood)	SANFL (formerly VFL)	car accident	2003
Doug Tassell	24	Essendon	VFL	car accident	1970
Jock Turner	26	Yallourn (formerly Essendon)	GFL (formerly VFL)	motor bike accident	1935
Peter White	26	Kyabram (formerly Carlton)	GVFL (formerly AFL)	drowning	1996
Anthony Williams	26	Port Adelaide	SANFL	building accident	1988
Gerry Williams	23	St Kilda	VFL	railway accident	1901
Brian Willis	21	Footscray	VFL	Brain haemorrhage	1951
Les Witto	23	Carlton	VFL	tetanus	1926

== On-field deaths ==
Date	Name	Age	Club (league)	Notes
17 June 1921	Phil Skehan	26	Williamstown (VFA)	The former South Melbourne player suffered a concussion and a broken leg in an 11 June game against Essendon Association, after both players attempted to kick a loose ball away. He died six days later due to a combination of concussion and hypostatic pneumonia.
7 July 1921	Lyle Downs	24	Carlton (VFL)	Following a club training session, Downs was receiving a massage for his injured shoulder (sustained five days earlier against Collingwood) when he slumped forward and died from a heart attack. Downs had previously briefly retired from the sport in 1919 after learning that his heart was overstrained.
17 September 1932	Ron Doig	23	South Fremantle (WANFL)	Playing in the semi-final against East Perth, Doig suffered injuries due to rough play, but elected to continue on for his team. Later that evening, Doig suffered from convulsions and died shortly before midnight at a hospital. An examination of his brain post-mortem showed signs of congestion and swelling, which may have been exacerbated due to Doig playing on.
11 July 1940	Stanley Poole	23	South Fremantle (WANFL)	Poole suffered abrasive injuries to his jaw in a 6 July game against Perth. He was treated at a hospital in Fremantle, and four days later returned to the hospital as his jaw had continued swelling. The following day, Poole died during an operation due to heart failure. A post-mortem later found that the swelling was due to a laryngeal oedema caused by Ludwig's angina, which resulted in Poole's heart failing mid-operation. The infection itself may have entered Poole's jaw through his injury.
13 July 1946	Eddie Ford	28	Katandra (CGVFL)	The former Richmond player collided with an opponent during a game against Ardmona. Though initially stunned, Ford played out the match and returned home, but later died in a Mooroopna hospital that evening. A later post-mortem concluded that the collision had fractured part of his temporal bone, causing a small piece to perforate his middle meningeal artery, leading to a fatal brain bleed.
21 March 1971	George Allen	22	Sunshine (VFA)	Collapsed and died from a heart attack during a practice match against Benalla. He had landed heavily following a marking contest five minutes earlier and had shown no ill effects from the landing.
17 June 1989	Greg Pimm	32	Mitcham (EDFL)	Collapsed and died from a heart attack during a league match against Ringwood.
1 May 1999	Peter Hug	24	Sale (GLFL)	Died after colliding with an opponent during a league game against Traralgon.
2 May 2015	Aaron Mahoney	24	Otway Districts (CDFNL)	Died from a heart attack after being tackled during a league match against Lorne.
30 May 2015	Mohammed Allouche	22	Northern Saints (EDFL)	Collapsed and died from a heart attack after kicking a goal in a reserves match against Avondale Heights.
23 April 2023	Antonio Loiacono	20	Birdwood (HFL)	During a 22 April game against Gumeracha, Loiacono collided with an opponent while attempting to pick up the ball. He went into cardiac arrest and passed away the next day after his condition deteriorated.
6 July 2026	Nathan Fitzgerald	27	Epping (NFNL)	During a reserves game against Lalor on 4 July, Fitzgerald suffered three head knocks in rapid succession (the first from a head clash, the second from a player's knee or foot, and the third from striking a covered cricket pitch) after attempting to tackle an opponent. He was transported to the Royal Melbourne Hospital in a serious condition, but his life support was turned off two days later after his condition deteriorated.

== See also ==
- List of Victorian Football League players who died on active service
