= 2016 Adelaide Football Club season =

Adelaide Football Club
2016 season
- President: Andrew Fagan
- Coach: Don Pyke (1st season)
- Captains: Taylor Walker (2nd season)
- Home ground: Adelaide Oval (Capacity: 53,583)
- AFL season: 5th
- Finals: 6th
- Malcolm Blight Medal: Rory Sloane
- Leading goalkicker: Eddie Betts (66 goals)
- Highest home attendance: 53,141
- Lowest home attendance: 37,890
- Average home attendance: 47,056
- Club membership: 54,307

The 2016 AFL season was the 26th season in the Australian Football League contested by the Adelaide Football Club.

Following the conclusion of the 2015 season which was marred by the mid-season passing of previous head coach Phil Walsh due to an alleged murder, former assistant coach Don Pyke was named as the club's new head coach for the 2016 season on 9 October 2015. Scott Camporeale had acted as interim head coach between Walsh's death and Pyke's appointment, but after electing not to apply for the full-time coaching role, reverted to his previous role of midfield coach for the new season.

== 2016 Squad ==
Adelaide Football Club
Senior list		Rookie list	Coaching staff
2 Brad Crouch; 3 Riley Knight; 4 Josh Jenkins; 5 Scott Thompson; 6 Jake Lever; 7 Nathan van Berlo; 8 Mitch Grigg; 9 Rory Sloane; 10 Matthew Jaensch (ret); 11 Paul Seedsman; 12 Daniel Talia; 13 Taylor Walker (c); 14 David Mackay; 15 Kyle Hartigan; 16 Luke Brown; 17 Curtly Hampton; 18 Eddie Betts; 21 Rory Atkins; 22 Andy Otten; 23 Charlie Cameron	24 Sam Jacobs; 25 Kyle Cheney; 26 Richard Douglas; 27 Tom Lynch; 28 Cam Ellis-Yolmen; 29 Rory Laird; 30 Wayne Milera; 31 Jarryd Lyons; 32 Troy Menzel; 33 Brodie Smith; 34 Sam Shaw; 35 Harrison Wigg; 36 Dean Gore; 38 Harry Dear; 39 Tom Doedee; 40 Luke Lowden; 41 Mitch McGovern; 44 Matt Crouch; 45 Ricky Henderson; 47 Jake Kelly	1 Jonathon Beech; 20 Hugh Greenwood (B); 37 Paul Hunter; 42 Alex Keath (B); 43 Reilly O'Brien; 46 Keenan Ramsey	Head coach: Don Pyke; Assistant coaches: Scott Camporeale (midfield); David Teague (forwards); Matthew Clarke (ruck); James Podsiadly (defensive); Heath Younie (development manager and reserves); Ryan O'Keefe (midfield development); Tate Kaesler (forwards development); Paul Thomas (defensive development); Legend: (c) Captain(s); (vc) Vice-captain(s); Long-term injury list; Upgraded rookie(s); (vet) Veteran list; (ret) Retired; (B) Category B rookie; Updated: 18 August 2016; Source(s): Senior list, Rookie list, Coaches

== Playing list changes ==
The following summarises all player changes between the conclusion of the 2015 season and the beginning of the 2016 season.

=== In ===
No.	Player	Previous club	League	via
20	(Tasmania) Hugh Greenwood	Perth Wildcats	NBL	Rookie draft
36	(South Australia) Dean Gore	Geelong	AFL	Traded
17	(Northern Territory) Curtly Hampton	GWS	AFL	Traded
11	(Victoria (state)) Paul Seedsman	Collingwood	AFL	Traded
32	(South Australia) Troy Menzel	Carlton	AFL	Traded
42	(Victoria (state)) Alex Keath	Victorian Bushrangers/Melbourne Stars	Sheffield Shield/Big Bash League	Rookie draft
30	(South Australia) Wayne Milera	Central District	SANFL	National draft
39	(Victoria (state)) Tom Doedee	Geelong Falcons	VFL	National draft
37	(New South Wales) Paul Hunter	Redland Football Club	NEAFL	Rookie draft
1	(South Australia) Jono Beech	West Adelaide	SANFL	Rookie draft

=== Out ===
Player	New club	League	via
(Victoria (state)) James Podsiadly			Retired
(Victoria (state)) Brent Reilly			Retired
(Tasmania) Sam Siggins	Lauderdale	TSL	Delisted
(South Australia) Brodie Martin	Sturt	SANFL	Delisted
(Tasmania) Jack Osborn	Sturt	SANFL	Delisted
(South Australia) Anthony Wilson	Norwood	SANFL	Delisted
(Victoria (state)) Patrick Dangerfield	Geelong	AFL	Traded
(Victoria (state)) Sam Kerridge	Carlton	AFL	Traded
(South Australia) Matthew Wright	Carlton	AFL	Delisted
(South Australia) Matthew Jaensch	Hahndorf	HFL	Retired

== Coaching panel changes ==
The following summarises all coaching changes between the conclusion of the 2015 season and the beginning of the 2016 season.

Coach	Previous club	League	Coaching role	Replacing
Don Pyke	West Coast	AFL	Senior coach	Phil Walsh
James Podsiadly	Adelaide	AFL	Assistant coach (defence)	Darren Milburn

== Season summary ==
=== Pre-season matches ===
**Rd**	**Date and local time**	**Opponent**	**Scores** (Adelaide's scores indicated in **bold**)			**Venue**	**Attendance**	**Ref**
**Rd**	**Date and local time**	**Opponent**	Home	Away	Result	**Venue**	**Attendance**	**Ref**
1	Sunday, 21 February (1:35 pm)	West Coast	**2.20.10 (148)**	0.7.6 (48)	Won by 100 points	Unley Oval (H)	8,000	
2	Sunday, 28 February (1:40 pm)	Fremantle	1.9.6 (69)	**0.8.19 (67)**	Lost by 2 points	Sounness Park (A)	4,767	
3	Sunday, 11 March (1:10 pm)	Gold Coast	0.11.18 (84)	**3.12.10 (109)**	Won by 25 points	Metricon Stadium (A)	4,460	

=== Home and away season ===
Players written in bold received Brownlow Medal votes for their game.

**Rd**	**Date and local time**	**Opponent**	**Scores** (Adelaide's scores indicated in **bold**)			**Venue**	**Attendance**	**Ladder** **position**	**Best players**	**Ref.**
**Rd**	**Date and local time**	**Opponent**	Home	Away	Result	**Venue**	**Attendance**	**Ladder** **position**	**Best players**	**Ref.**
1	Saturday 26 March (7:25 pm)	North Melbourne	16.11 (107)	**14.13 (97)**	Lost by 10 points	Etihad Stadium (A)	25,485	11	**Jenkins**, Thompson, Laird, Smith, M. Crouch, Walker	
2	Saturday 2 April (1:15 pm)	Port Adelaide	**22.12 (144)**	11.20 (80)	Won by 58 points	Adelaide Oval (H)	51,585	5 ▲	**Lynch**, Laird, Talia, Lever, **Betts**, Mackay, Thompson	
3	Saturday 9 April (2:10 pm)	Richmond	13.14 (92)	**19.14 (128)**	Won by 36 points	Etihad Stadium (A)	29,951	6 ▼	**Thompson**, Laird, Betts, **Smith**, Walker, M. Crouch, Seedsman	
4	Saturday 16 April (7:10 pm)	Sydney	**16.17 (113)**	15.13 (103)	Won by 10 points	Adelaide Oval (H)	51,330	7 ▼	Thompson, **Atkins**, **Sloane**, Lynch, Betts, Douglas	
5	Friday 22 April (7:50 pm)	Hawthorn	17.10 (112)	**17.7 (109)**	Lost by 3 points	MCG (A)	45,781	9 ▼	Sloane, **Thompson**, Atkins, Mackay, Lynch, Jacobs	
6	Saturday 30 April (1:40 pm)	Fremantle	**14.13 (97)**	8.16 (64)	Won by 33 points	Adelaide Oval (H)	47,423	7 ▲	**Sloane**, Lynch, Laird, Jacobs, **Betts**, Hartigan	
7	Saturday 7 May (7:40 pm)	Western Bulldogs	18.15 (123)	**17.6 (108)**	Lost by 15 points	Etihad Stadium (A)	26,984	8 ▼	**Jenkins**, M. Crouch, Henderson, Lynch, Smith	
8	Friday 13 May (7:20 pm)	Geelong	**11.6 (72)**	13.20 (98)	Lost by 26 points	Adelaide Oval (H)	53,141	8	**Sloane**, Cameron, Lynch, Henderson	
9	Saturday 21 May (2:10 pm)	Gold Coast	11.8 (74)	**22.17 (149)**	Won by 75 points	Metricon Stadium (A)	11,692	8	Douglas, Jacobs, **Lynch**, **Talia**, Thompson, Seedsman, **Walker**	
10	Saturday May 28 (7:10 pm)	Greater Western Sydney	**15.17 (107)**	13.7 (85)	Won by 22 points	Adelaide Oval (H)	46,737	8	**Walker**, **Betts**, Thompson, Atkins, Sloane, Talia, Lever, Douglas	
11	Sunday 5 June (4:10 pm)	St Kilda	**19.19 (133)**	6.9 (45)	Won by 88 points	Adelaide Oval (H)	40,896	8	**Jenkins**, **M. Crouch**, **Sloane**, Talia, Jacobs, Lever	
12	Saturday 11 June (5:40 pm)	West Coast	11.10 (76)	**15.15 (105)**	Won by 29 points	Domain Stadium (A)	37,591	7 ▲	**Sloane**, **Betts**, Thompson, **Laird**, M. Crouch, Talia, Jenkins, Lynch	
13	Bye									
14	Thursday 23 June (7:20 pm)	North Melbourne	**12.28 (100)**	10.7 (67)	Won by 33 points	Adelaide Oval (H)	37,890	6 ▲	**M. Crouch**, **Sloane**, Laird, Atkins, Talia, Lever, Lynch	
15	Sunday 3 July (3:20 pm)	Melbourne	15.8 (98)	**18.12 (120)**	Won by 22 points	MCG (A)	29,133	5 ▲	**Laird**, Walker, M. Crouch, B. Crouch, Cameron, Douglas	
16	Sunday 10 July (1:10 pm)	Carlton	7.5 (47)	**16.11 (107)**	Won by 60 points	MCG (A)	32,430	3 ▲	**Laird**, **Sloane**, Henderson, Talia, Lever, **Jacobs**	
17	Saturday 16 July (7:10 pm)	Collingwood	**14.13 (97)**	10.9 (69)	Won by 28 points	Adelaide Oval (H)	50,012	2 ▲	Smith, Sloane, Talia, Lyons, **B. Crouch**, Lever	
18	Saturday 23 July (7:25 pm)	Geelong	12.13 (85)	**7.13 (55)**	Lost by 30 points	Simonds Stadium (A)	21,127	6 ▼	M. Crouch, B. Crouch, Laird, Thompson, Jenkins	
19	Sunday 31 July (4:10 pm)	Essendon	**22.11 (143)**	9.7 (61)	Won by 88 points	Adelaide Oval (H)	44,264	5 ▲	**Laird**, **Sloane**, **Betts**, B. Crouch, McGovern, Thompson	
20	Saturday 6 August (7:10 pm)	Brisbane Lions	**27.15 (177)**	6.3 (39)	Won by 138 points	Adelaide Oval (H)	43,549	3 ▲	Laird, **Sloane**, Walker, Lynch, **Talia**, Jenkins, Betts, **B. Crouch**	
21	Sunday 14 August (2:40 pm)	Fremantle	11.4 (70)	**21.16 (142)**	Won by 72 points	Domain Stadium (A)	30,116	3	**Betts**, Jenkins, B. Crouch, **Laird**, Douglas, Lyons, Atkins	
22	Saturday 20 August (7:10 pm)	Port Adelaide	14.10 (94)	**15.19 (109)**	Won by 15 points	Adelaide Oval (A)	49,541	2 ▲	**M. Crouch**, Lyons, Sloane, **Betts**, Atkins, Thompson	
23	Friday 26 August (7:40 pm)	West Coast	**10.11 (71)**	14.16 (100)	Lost by 29 points	Adelaide Oval (H)	50,785	5 ▼	M. Crouch, Laird, Henderson	

=== Finals matches ===
**Rd**	**Date and local time**	**Opponent**	**Scores** (Adelaide's scores indicated in **bold**)			**Venue**	**Attendance**	**Best players**	**Ref.**
**Rd**	**Date and local time**	**Opponent**	Home	Away	Result	**Venue**	**Attendance**	**Best players**	**Ref.**
QF	Saturday, 10 September (7:10 pm)	North Melbourne	**21.15 (141)**	12.7 (79)	Won by 62 points	Adelaide Oval (H)	49,007	Betts, Lynch, M. Crouch, Smith, Lyons, Thompson, Walker	
SF	Saturday, 17 September (7:25pm)	Sydney	18.10 (118)	**12.10 (82)**	Lost by 36 points	Sydney Cricket Ground (A)	38,126	M. Crouch, Laird, Sloane, Atkins, Thompson	

== Ladder ==
Pos	Team	Pld	W	L	D	PF	PA	PP	Pts	Qualification
1	Sydney	22	17	5	0	2221	1469	151.2	68	2016 finals
2	Geelong	22	17	5	0	2235	1554	143.8	68	2016 finals
3	Hawthorn	22	17	5	0	2134	1800	118.6	68	2016 finals
4	Greater Western Sydney	22	16	6	0	2380	1663	143.1	64	2016 finals
5	Adelaide	22	16	6	0	2483	1795	138.3	64	2016 finals
6	West Coast	22	16	6	0	2181	1678	130.0	64	2016 finals
7	Western Bulldogs (P)	22	15	7	0	1857	1609	115.4	60	2016 finals
8	North Melbourne	22	12	10	0	1956	1859	105.2	48	2016 finals
9	St Kilda	22	12	10	0	1953	2041	95.7	48	
10	Port Adelaide	22	10	12	0	2055	1939	106.0	40	
11	Melbourne	22	10	12	0	1944	1991	97.6	40	
12	Collingwood	22	9	13	0	1910	1998	95.6	36	
13	Richmond	22	8	14	0	1713	2155	79.5	32	
14	Carlton	22	7	15	0	1568	1978	79.3	28	
15	Gold Coast	22	6	16	0	1778	2273	78.2	24	
16	Fremantle	22	4	18	0	1574	2119	74.3	16	
17	Brisbane Lions	22	3	19	0	1770	2872	61.6	12	
18	Essendon	22	3	19	0	1437	2356	61.0	12	

Source: AFL
Rules for classification: 1) points; 2) percentage; 3) number of points for.
(P) Premiers

== Match Review Panel ==
Player	Round	Charge category	Verdict	Result	Victim	Club	Ref
Kyle Hartigan	6	Rough Conduct	Guilty	$1000 fine	Michael Walters	Fremantle
Taylor Walker	12	Striking	Guilty	$1000 fine	Luke Shuey	West Coast Eagles
Matt Crouch	18	Wrestling	Guilty	$1500 fine	Steven Motlop	Geelong Cats
Rory Sloane	22	Rough Conduct	Guilty	One-match suspension	Brad Ebert	Port Adelaide
Kyle Hartigan	EF	Tripping	Guilty	$1500 fine	Lindsay Thomas	North Melbourne
Sam Jacobs	SF	Rough Conduct	Guilty	$1000 fine	Ben McGlynn	Sydney Swans

== Awards ==
=== Brownlow Medal ===
Player	3 Vote Games	2 Vote Games	1 Vote Games	Total Votes
Rory Sloane	5	4	1	24
Rory Laird	2	2	1	11
Eddie Betts		3	4	10
Josh Jenkins	2	1		8
Matt Crouch	2		1	7
Taylor Walker	2			6
Scott Thompson	1	1		5
Tom Lynch	1	1		5
Brad Crouch		2		4
Sam Jacobs		1		2
Brodie Smith		1		2
Daniel Talia			2	2
Rory Atkins			1	1

Italics denotes ineligible players

=== Malcolm Blight Medal Top 10 ===
Position	Player	Votes
1st	Rory Sloane	268
2nd	Eddie Betts	249
3rd	Tom Lynch	215
4th	Daniel Talia	192
5th	Taylor Walker	185
6th	Brodie Smith	183
7th	Matt Crouch	180
8th	Kyle Hartigan	171
9th	Charlie Cameron	168
10th	Josh Jenkins	167

=== Other Awards ===
Leading Goalkicker: Eddie Betts (75)

Phil Walsh Best Team Man: Eddie Betts

Chelsea Phillis Coaches Award: Rory Sloane

Mark Bickley Emerging Talent: Jake Lever

19th Man Award: Rory Sloane

Dr Brian Sando OAM Trophy: David Mackay

State League Club Champion: Jono Beech

Dean Bailey Award: Luke Carey

Crows Children's Foundation Community Leadership Award: Kyle Hartigan and Charlie Cameron

== Individual awards and records ==
=== Milestones ===
Milestones
No.	State	Player	Milestone	Round
11	(Victoria (state))	Paul Seedsman	50th Match	Round 1
12	(Victoria (state))	Daniel Talia	100th Match	Round 2
41	(Western Australia)	Mitch McGovern	1st Goal	Round 2
30	(South Australia)	Wayne Milera	1st Goal	Round 2
33	(Victoria (state))	Brodie Smith	100th Match	Round 3
5	(South Australia)	Scott Thompson	250th Match for Adelaide	Round 4
18	(South Australia)	Eddie Betts	50th Match for Adelaide	Round 5
14	(Victoria (state))	David Mackay	150th Match	Round 6
27	(Victoria (state))	Tom Lynch	100th Goal	Round 7
4	(Victoria (state))	Josh Jenkins	150th Goal	Round 11
27	(Victoria (state))	Tom Lynch	100th Goal for Adelaide	Round 12
18	(South Australia)	Eddie Betts	150th Goal for Adelaide	Round 15
5	(South Australia)	Scott Thompson	300th Match	Round 17
18	(South Australia)	Eddie Betts	450th Goal	Round 19
23	(Queensland)	Charlie Cameron	50th Goal	Round 19
15	(Victoria (state))	Kyle Hartigan	1st Goal	Round 19
43	(Victoria (state))	Reilly O'Brien	1st Goal	Round 20
6	(Victoria (state))	Jake Lever	1st Goal	Round 21
18	(South Australia)	Eddie Betts	250th Match	Round 22
13	(New South Wales)	Taylor Walker	300th Goal	Elimination Final

=== Debuts ===
Debuts
No.	State	Player	Round
11	(Victoria (state))	Paul Seedsman	Round 1^{1}
30	(South Australia)	Wayne Milera	Round 1
41	(Western Australia)	Mitch McGovern	Round 1
43	(Victoria (state))	Reilly O'Brien	Round 21

^{1}They had previously played for another club but played their first match for Adelaide.

== Reserves ==
=== Regular season ===
Players written in bold received Magarey Medal votes for their game.

**Rd**	**Date and local time**	**Opponent**	**Scores** (Adelaide's scores indicated in **bold**)			**Venue**	**Ladder** **position**	**Best players**	**Ref.**
**Rd**	**Date and local time**	**Opponent**	Home	Away	Result	**Venue**	**Ladder** **position**	**Best players**	**Ref.**
1	Saturday 26 March (2:10 pm)	West Adelaide	7.8 (50)	**18.16 (124)**	Won by 74 points	Richmond Oval (A)	2	O'Brien, **Beech, Ellis-Yolmen, Knight**, Castree, Henderson	
2	Sunday 3 April (1:40 pm)	Port Adelaide	**15.14 (104)**	10.14 (74)	Won by 30 points	Mannum Oval (H)	1	Lyons, **Knight**, O'Brien, Ramsey, Kelly, van Berlo	
3	Sunday 10 April (2:10 pm)	Woodville-West Torrens	8.5 (53)	**14.12 (96)**	Won by 43 points	Woodville Oval (A)	1	Gore, Beech, Ellis-Yolmen, Shaw, Kelly, Cameron	
4	Bye								
5	Sunday 24 April (2:10 pm)	Glenelg	13.8 (86)	**17.14 (116)**	Won by 30 points	Glenelg Oval (A)	1	Beech, Keath, **Greenwood**, Gore, **Henderson**, Otten	
6	Sunday 1 May (2:10 pm)	South Adelaide	14.7 (91)	**13.12 (90)**	Lost by 1 point	Hickinbotham Oval (A)	2	Grigg, **Ellis-Yolmen**, van Berlo, Doedee, B. Crouch, Heffernan	
7	Sunday 8 May (1:10 pm)	North Adelaide	9.9 (63)	**9.13 (67)**	Won by 4 points	Prospect Oval (A)	2	**Wigg**, Greenwood, Ramsey, Leigh, Doedee, Dear	
8	Bye								
9	Saturday 21 May (2:10 pm)	Central District	15.9 (99)	**12.4 (76)**	Lost by 23 points	Elizabeth Oval (A)	3	**B. Crouch**, Otten, Grigg, Greenwood, Doedee	
10	Saturday June 4 (2:10 pm)	Sturt	10.10 (70)	**9.6 (60)**	Lost by 10 points	Unley Oval (A)	5	Otten, van Berlo, Mackay, Menzel, Wigg, **B. Crouch**	
11	Sunday 12 June (1:40 pm)	Norwood	7.11 (53)	**14.16 (100)**	Won by 47 points	Hindmarsh Stadium (A)	4	Ellis-Yolmen, **B. Crouch, Henderson**, O'Brien, Doedee, Shoenmakers	
12	Bye								
13	Saturday 25 June (2:10 pm)	Central District	17.8 (110)	**8.7 (55)**	Lost by 55 points	Elizabeth Oval (A)	5	Doedee, Henderson, Shoenmakers, Lowden	
14	Saturday 2 July (2:10 pm)	North Adelaide	9.9 (63)	**11.12 (78)**	Won by 15 points	Prospect Oval (A)	4	Dear, Milera, Spriggs, Gore, Doedee, Otten	
15	Saturday 9 July (2:10 pm)	Sturt	**13.9 (87)**	11.9 (75)	Won by 12 points	Thebarton Oval (H)	4	Wigg, **Ellis-Yolmen**, Ramsey, Dear, Gore, O'Brien	
16	Sunday 17 July (2:10 pm)	Glenelg	15.11 (101)	**12.10 (82)**	Lost by 19 points	Glenelg Oval (A)	4	O'Brien, Doedee, Grigg, Ellis-Yolmen, Beech, Greenwood	
17	Saturday 23 July (2:10 pm)	Woodville-West Torrens	10.13 (73)	**8.5 (53)**	Lost by 20 points	Woodville Oval (A)	4	Wigg, Keath, Doedee, Castree, Dear	
18	Sunday 31 July (1:40 pm)	Port Adelaide	12.7 (79)	**16.8 (104)**	Won by 25 points	Alberton Oval (A)	4	**Ellis-Yolmen**, Grigg, O'Brien, **Beech**, Hampton, Gore	
19	Bye								
20	Saturday 13 August (2:10 pm)	Norwood	11.10 (76)	**18.10 (118)**	Won by 42 points	Hindmarsh Stadium (A)	4	**Beech**, Otten, Wigg, Doedee, Grigg, Greenwood	
21	Sunday 21 August (1:10 pm)	West Adelaide	13.7 (85)	**27.17 (179)**	Won by 94 points	Berri Oval (A)	4	**Wigg**, Shoenmakers, **Gore**, Knight, O'Brien, **Grigg**	
22	Saturday 27 August (2:10 pm)	South Adelaide	14.16 (100)	**9.8 (62)**	Won by 38 points	Hickinbothom Oval (A)	4	Beech, Greenwood, Grigg, Ramsey, Knight	
EF	Saturday 3 September (12:10 pm)	Central District	19.11 (125)	7.11 (53)	Won by 72 points	Adelaide Oval (H)	-	Greenwood, Knight, Ellis-Yolmen, Otten, Menzel, Wigg	
SF	Sunday 11 September (12:10 pm)	South Adelaide	13.8 (86)	**22.8 (140)**	Won by 54 points	Adelaide Oval (A)	-	Beech, Greenwood, Otten, Gore, Grigg, Dear	
PF	Sunday 18 September (2:10 pm)	Sturt	15.13 (103)	**10.8 (68)**	Lost by 35 points	Adelaide Oval (A)	-	Beech, Knight, Greenwood, Grigg, Menzel, Milera	
