= Joe Hickey =

Joseph or Joe Hickey may refer to:

- Joe Hickey (footballer) (1929–2021), Australian rules footballer
- Joe Hickey (politician) (1911–1970), American politician and judge, U.S. senator from Wyoming and governor of Wyoming
- Joseph Hickey (ornithologist) (1907–1993), American ornithologist
