= Le Lievre =

Le Lievre is a surname. French: lièvre means 'hare'. Notable people with the surname include:

- John Le Lievre (1956–2021), English squash player
- Jules Le Lievre (1933–2016), New Zealand rugby union player
- Stan Le Lievre (1920–2003), Australian rules footballer

John Le Lievre (1950-) Clinical Psychologist
