= Frank Vearing =

Australian rules footballer

Personal information
- Full name: Frank Vearing
- Born: 21 November 1943
- Died: 25 May 2023
- Original team: Epping
- Height: 173 cm (5 ft 8 in)
- Weight: 75 kg (165 lb)

Playing career^{1}
Years	Club	Games (Goals)
1965–66	Melbourne	11 (5)
- ^{1} Playing statistics correct to the end of 1966.

Frank Vearing (born 21 November 1943) is a former Australian rules footballer who played with Melbourne in the Victorian Football League (VFL).
