= Tom Magee (footballer) =

Australian rules footballer (1929–2021)

Personal information
- Full name: Thomas Edward Magee
- Born: 17 February 1929
- Died: 22 March 2021 (aged 92)
- Original team: Katandra
- Height: 183 cm (6 ft 0 in)
- Weight: 76 kg (168 lb)

Playing career^{1}
Years	Club	Games (Goals)
1951–53	Fitzroy	39 (6)
1954	Melbourne	1 (1)
Total		40 (7)
- ^{1} Playing statistics correct to the end of 1954.

Thomas Edward Magee (17 February 1929 – 22 March 2021) was an Australian rules footballer who played with Fitzroy and Melbourne in the Victorian Football League (VFL).
