= Jake Kelly (Australian footballer) =

Australian rules footballer (born 1995)

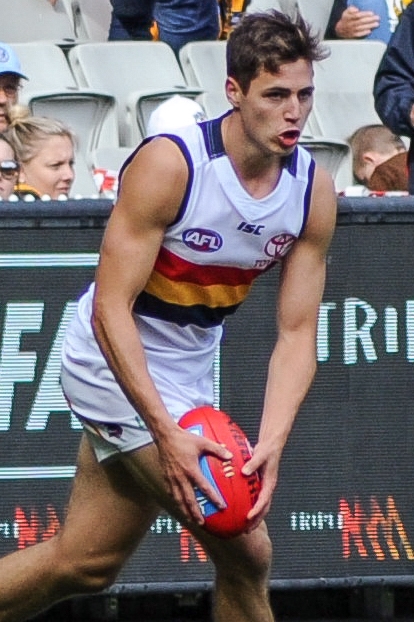
- Kelly playing for Adelaide in April 2017

Personal information
- Full name: Jake Kelly
- Nicknames: Kells, Bull
- Born: 21 January 1995 (age 31)
- Original teams: Oakleigh Chargers (TAC Cup); Collingwood (VFL)
- Draft: No. 40, 2014 rookie daft
- Debut: Round 3, 2015, Adelaide vs. Melbourne, at Adelaide Oval
- Height: 190 cm (6 ft 3 in)
- Weight: 90 kg (198 lb)
- Position: Medium defender

Playing career
Years	Club	Games (Goals)
2014–2021	Adelaide	110 (1)
2022–2024	Essendon	58 (3)
Total		168 (4)

Jake Kelly (born 21 January 1995) is a former professional Australian rules football player who played for Adelaide and Essendon in the Australian Football League (AFL). Kelly was drafted to Adelaide with pick 40 in the 2014 Rookie Draft, and is the son of former Collingwood player Craig Kelly.

== Early life ==
As the son of an AFL premiership player, Kelly played for the Kew Comets and the Glen Iris Gladiators, part of the Yarra Junior Football League, in his youth. He then played for his high school Scotch College and the Oakleigh Chargers in the TAC Cup and also made appearances for Collingwood's VFL side as a teenager. Though he wasn't originally on the list to appear at the national draft combine in 2013, he was added to the list after impressive form in the VFL. At the combine he ran the third-fastest three-kilometre time trial, finishing in 9 minutes and 51 seconds.

Collingwood had the option of nominating him as a father-son selection in the 2013 national draft, but they decided not to, instead saying they would consider selecting him as a father-son pick if he wasn't drafted in the national draft. He wasn't selected in the draft, but Collingwood chose not to select him in their list anyway, forcing him to go to the rookie draft. He was drafted by Adelaide with pick 40.

== AFL career ==
=== Adelaide ===
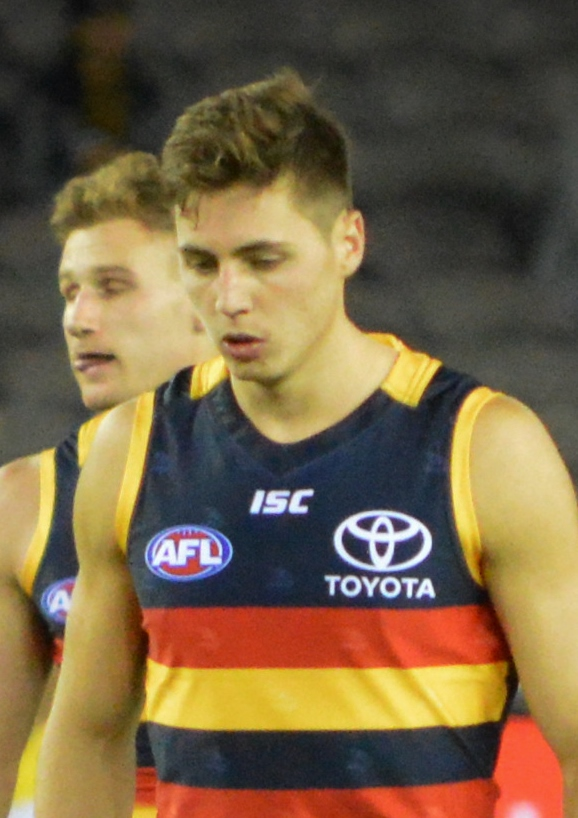
Kelly during the 2017 pre-season.

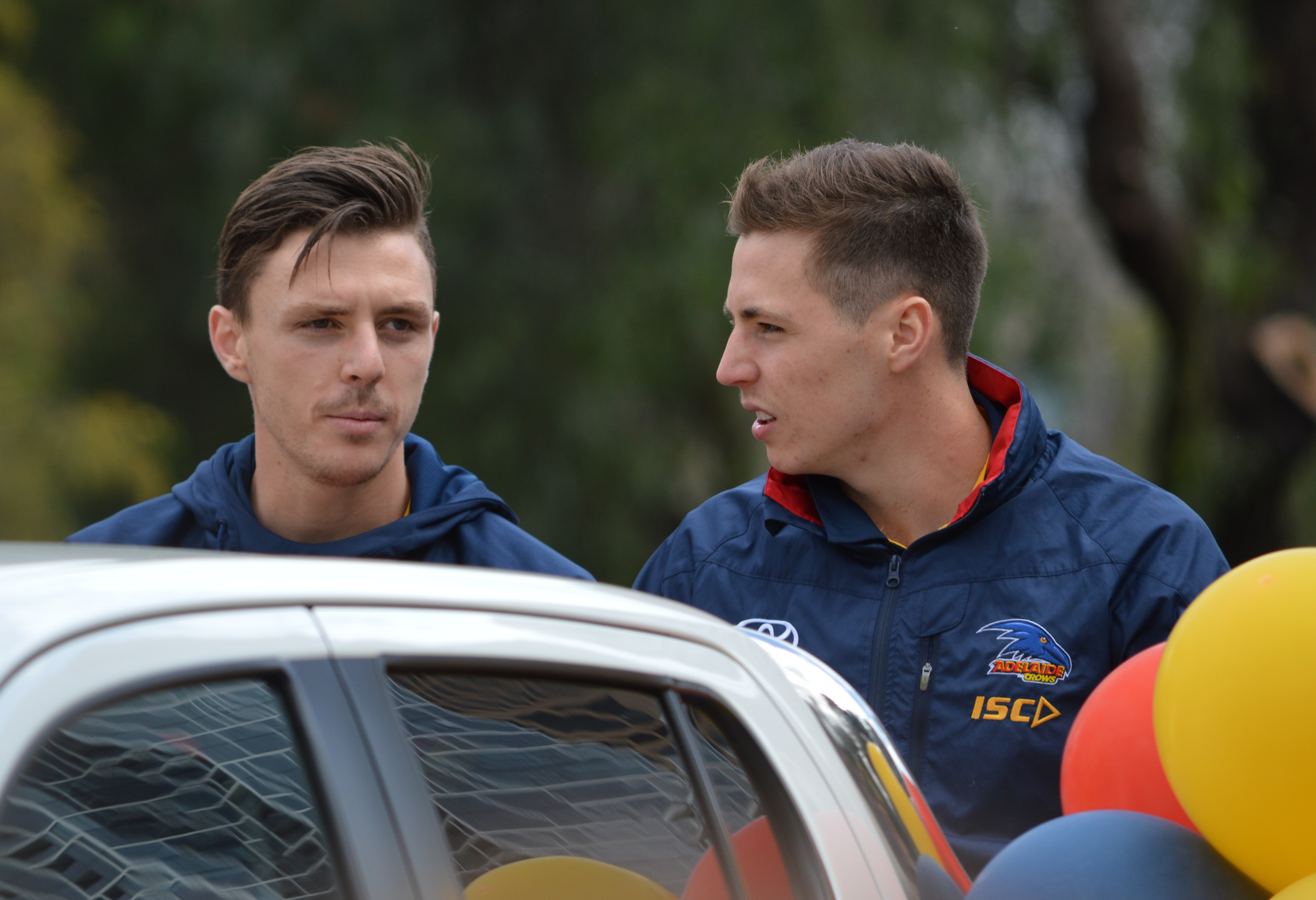
Kelly and Jake Lever in the 2017 Grand Final parade.

==== Rookie list (2014–2015) ====
Kelly started his career playing for Adelaide's reserves team in the SANFL. At the start of 2014 he was a standout in the inexperienced backline, successfully tagging several experienced SANFL forwards. This form continued through the rest of the season as he performed well, nullifying some of the competition's best forwards while averaging 16 possessions and leading the club in marks. He was second in the reserves club's best and fairest.

In early 2015, Kelly was elevated to the club's senior list, replacing the injured Brent Reilly. He made his debut against Melbourne in round 3 of the season, laying 10 tackles in the match. After playing ten games for the club, he was given a two-year contract, keeping him at the club until the end of the 2017 season. At the end of the season he was officially promoted from the club's rookie list to their senior list.

==== Senior list (2016–2021) ====
After suffering a hand injury, Kelly started to build form in the SANFL in 2016 and was considered a chance of replacing the injured Daniel Talia in the AFL side late in the season. He ultimately failed to play a game in 2016 due to the team's impressive defensive performances, but performed reliably in the SANFL, averaging 20 disposals and ranking near the top of the club for rebound 50s, effective kicks and marks. In the offseason Adelaide considered trading Kelly to Carlton as part of a deal to get Bryce Gibbs to the club, but Carlton were unwilling to go through with the trade so Kelly stayed with the Crows.

For 2017, Kelly changed numbers from his old 47 to 8 after the departure of midfielder Mitch Grigg. In training for the 2017 season he again proved his endurance ability, finishing first in a 2 km time trial out of Adelaide's squad. Kelly had a chance to impress the Crows in the 2017 JLT Community Series, laying six tackles in the first match against Richmond. He again pushed for senior selection in the Crows’ final JLT Series match against Brisbane Lions, where he had 16 possessions and took seven marks. His pre-season form was enough to give him his first AFL match in 638 days in the Crows’ season opener. Kelly missed the round five match against Gold Coast due to being poked in the eye in the previous game against Essendon, but his form was good enough to keep his spot in the senior side for every other match of the season. Having established himself as one of the club's most reliable defenders, conceding less than one game per goal, he was given another two-year contract extension. He played in Adelaide's losing Grand Final effort against Richmond, where he had 20 possessions and 6 marks.

=== Essendon ===
Kelly joined Essendon as a free agent at the conclusion of the 2021 AFL season, and made his debut in round 1 of his first season with the Bombers. Kelly finished 7th in the Crichton Medal, Essendon's best and fairest award, at the end of his first season with the club.

Kelly became a regular in Essendon's backline in 2024 despite the off-season signing of defender Ben McKay. He played his 150th career game against St Kilda in round 3, and later came under fire for some costly mistakes in the round 19 thriller against his former side Adelaide. In the final round of the season, Kelly was fined for kicking Brisbane Lions forward Eric Hipwood, escaping suspension. Following another disappointing season for Essendon, Kelly made the "courageous" decision to make a shock retirement from AFL football after 168 games for two clubs.

== Player profile ==
As a junior, Kelly was a left-footed medium defender, capable of tagging both tall and small forwards and also with good rebounding skills. Early in his career, he earned the nickname “Bull” from his teammates for his competitiveness. His kicking was considered an issue, and was likely the reason that he was overlooked by Collingwood in 2013.

Kelly's endurance running is one of his greatest assets. At the draft combine in 2013 he recorded the third-fastest time in the three-kilometre time trial, and he again proved himself when he ran the fastest time in a two-kilometre time trial with Adelaide’s squad in the 2017 pre-season.

== Statistics ==
Legend
G	Goals	K	Kicks	D	Disposals	T	Tackles
B	Behinds	H	Handballs	M	Marks

Season	Team	No.	Games	Totals							Averages (per game)							Votes
Season	Team	No.	Games	G	B	K	H	D	M	T	G	B	K	H	D	M	T	Votes
2015	Adelaide	47	10	0	1	62	47	109	37	31	0.0	0.1	6.2	4.7	10.9	3.7	3.1	0
2017	Adelaide	8	24	0	0	182	174	356	104	66	0.0	0.0	7.6	7.3	14.8	4.3	2.8	0
2018	Adelaide	8	19	1	0	178	137	315	96	38	0.1	0.0	9.4	7.2	16.6	5.1	2.0	0
2019	Adelaide	8	22	0	1	214	142	356	114	60	0.0	0.0	9.7	6.5	16.2	5.2	2.7	0
2020 (Note: The 2020 season was played with 17 home-and-away matches per team (down from 22) and 16-minute quarters with time on (down from 20-minute quarters with time on) due to the impact of the COVID-19 pandemic.)	Adelaide	8	15	0	0	85	39	124	44	37	0.0	0.0	5.7	2.6	8.3	2.9	2.5	0
2021	Adelaide	8	20	0	0	214	95	309	102	42	0.0	0.0	10.7	4.8	15.5	5.1	2.1	0
2022	Essendon	29	21	1	0	196	104	300	132	27	0.0	0.0	9.3	5.0	14.3	6.3	1.3	0
2023	Essendon	29	17	1	0	136	108	244	91	28	0.1	0.0	8.0	6.4	14.4	5.4	1.6	0
2024	Essendon	29	20	1	0	194	111	305	115	26	0.1	0.0	9.7	5.6	15.3	5.8	1.3	0
2025	Essendon	29	0	—	—	—	—	—	—	—	—	—	—	—	—	—	—	0
Career			168	4	2	1461	957	2418	835	355	0.0	0.0	8.7	5.7	14.4	5.0	2.1	0

== Post-AFL career ==
Since his retirement from AFL football, Kelly's interest in golf has landed him an account manager role with LIV Golf. Based in London, Kelly returned to South Australia, where he previously played for the Crows, in 2026 during LIV Golf Adelaide.
