= Derek Hall (Australian footballer) =

Australian rules footballer

Personal information
- Full name: Derek Hall
- Born: 29 November 1970 (age 55)
- Original team: West Perth (WAFL)
- Draft: 64th, 1990 AFL draft
- Height: 189 cm (6 ft 2 in)
- Weight: 92 kg (203 lb)
- Position: Forward pocket

Playing career^{1}
Years	Club	Games (Goals)
1993	West Coast	2 (3)
1995 – 2000	Geelong	74 (74)
Total		76 (77)

Representative team honours
Years	Team	Games (Goals)
1991-1998	Western Australia	4 (2)
- ^{1} Playing statistics correct to the end of 2000.

Career highlights
- WAFL representative side 1991, 1994; Western Australia State of Origin representative 1996, 1998

Derek Hall (born 29 November 1970) is a former Australian rules footballer who played with the West Coast Eagles and Geelong in the Australian Football League (AFL).

== Early life ==
A basketball player in his youth, Hall was raised in Harvey in south-western Western Australia before moving to Perth to play for West Perth in the WAFL.

A strong marking forward, Hall was drafted by West Coast with pick 64 in the 1990 AFL draft, but had to wait until 1993 to make his senior AFL debut, playing two matches. He spent 1994 in the WAFL, topping West Perth's goal-kicking for the second time.

== Career ==
Hall nominated for the 1994 pre-season draft and was secured with the 16th selection by Geelong. He was used both as a forward and in the midfield by his new club. In 1996 he missed just one game, played in a qualifying final, had 334 disposals and kicked 24 goals. He also had 144 marks, which was the most by a Geelong player that season and was selected in Western Australia's State of Origin team. The following year he again performed well, kicking a further 26 goals and averaging 17.88 disposals a game.

Hall returned to the WAFL after leaving Geelong and played at Peel Thunder.

Hall was playing coach of Mooroopna in the Goulburn Valley Football Netball League from 2005 to 2007. He then coached Katandra in the Picola & District Football League from 2008 to 2010, taking them a grand final in 2008 and preliminary finals in 2009 and 2010. Hall won the 2009 Picola & District Football League senior football goalkicking award with 83 goals.

== Personal life ==
Hall's son Clay currently plays for the West Coast Eagles.
