= Jack Burgmann =

Australian rules footballer

Personal information
- Full name: Jack Burgmann
- Born: 7 April 1916
- Died: 21 October 1982 (aged 66)
- Original team: Katandra
- Height: 185 cm (6 ft 1 in)
- Weight: 89 kg (196 lb)

Playing career^{1}
Years	Club	Games (Goals)
1938	Richmond	1 (0)
- ^{1} Playing statistics correct to the end of 1938.

Jack Burgmann (7 April 1916 – 21 October 1982) was a former Australian rules footballer who played with Richmond in the Victorian Football League (VFL).
