= Reg Milburn =

Australian rules footballer

Personal information
- Full name: Reg Milburn
- Born: 25 March 1927
- Died: 3 July 2002 (aged 75)
- Original team: Epping
- Height: 178 cm (5 ft 10 in)
- Weight: 86 kg (190 lb)

Playing career^{1}
Years	Club	Games (Goals)
1949	Fitzroy	2 (0)
- ^{1} Playing statistics correct to the end of 1949.

Reg Milburn (25 March 1927 – 3 July 2002) was an Australian rules footballer who played with Fitzroy in the Victorian Football League (VFL).

Milburn came from Epping and won the Diamond Valley Football League's award for the best and fairest player in 1947.

He appeared in the final two rounds of the 1949 VFL season for Fitzroy.
