= Kalev Vann =

Australian rules footballer

- Vann in a Preston jersey in 1981

Personal information
- Full name: Kalev Eduard Vann
- Born: 4 December 1956; Carlton, Victoria, Australia
- Died: 13 December 2011 (aged 55); Australia
- Original team: South Morang Football Club (DVFL)
- Debut: 11 June 1977, Fitzroy vs. Geelong, at Kardinia Park
- Height: 185 cm (6 ft 1 in)
- Weight: 76 kg (168 lb)
- Position: Centre half-forward/Ruckman

Playing career^{1}
Years	Club	Games (Goals)
?	South Morang (DVFL)	? (?)
?	Preston (VFA)	? (?)
1977	Fitzroy (VFL)	2 (0)
1979–1983	Preston (VFA)	5+ (72+)
1990	Epping (DVFL)	10+ (?)
- ^{1} Playing statistics correct to the end of 1990.

Career highlights
- VFL debut with Fitzroy on 11 June 1977 v Geelong at Kardinia Park; 1979 Preston leading goalkicker with 50 goals; Epping captain 1990; Epping premiership player 1990

Kalev Eduard Vann (4 December 1956 – 13 December 2011) was an Australian rules footballer, who played for the Fitzroy Football Club in the Victorian Football League (VFL). He wore number 13 in his year at Fitzroy, and played two games. He did not score in either of those games, despite being a forward. He suffered a knee injury in 1980, but was back in full form in 1981 playing for Preston in the VFA. He had 3 children, one named Jaiden, then Kiel and his daughter Kendra. He died of cancer in 2011, aged 55.
