= Trevor Johnson (footballer) =

Australian rules footballer

Personal information
- Born: 25 January 1935
- Died: 10 November 2016 (aged 81)
- Original team: Epping (DVFL)
- Height: 185 cm (6 ft 1 in)
- Weight: 83 kg (183 lb)
- Positions: Centre Half Forward, Back Pocket

Playing career^{1}
Years	Club	Games (Goals)
1955–1962	Melbourne	118 (9)
- ^{1} Playing statistics correct to the end of 1962.

Career highlights
- Melbourne premiership player 1955, 1956, 1957, 1960

Trevor Johnson (25 January 1935 – 10 November 2016) was an Australian rules football player in the Victorian Football League (VFL).

Johnson, who played 118 games for Melbourne from 1955-62 and was a member of Melbourne’s golden era, playing in the club’s 1955-56-57 and 1960 VFL Premierships.

Recruited from the Epping FC and rejecting offers to join Fitzroy and Collingwood in 1952, Johnson joined the club he barracked for growing up: Melbourne.

Although listed by Melbourne in 1953, he did not play for the club that year due to national service. He played reserves in 1954 and was part of Melbourne’s reserves Grand Final team, which lost to Richmond.

He then made his VFL/AFL debut in round three, 1955 against Footscray at the MCG, which Melbourne won by 12 points.

He won Melbourne’s best first year player award in 1955.

Originally a back-pocket player, Johnson later played at centre half-forward.

He was considered the ultimate team man and nicknamed ‘Phantom’, due to his ability to go under the radar. Johnson was the classic underrated player.

After playing in three premierships in his first three senior seasons, Johnson played in Melbourne’s shock loss to Collingwood in the 1958 Grand Final. He missed Melbourne’s 1959 flag, but returned to play in the 1960 premiership – his fourth for the red and blue.

Johnson retired in 1962 and was made a life member of the club.

In 1968, Johnson coached Melbourne’s under 19s.

In 2004, he was inducted into the Sport Australia Hall of Fame as a member of the 1956 Melbourne premiership team – widely regarded as one of the greatest teams in VFL/AFL history.

He was also awarded an Order of the Medal of Australia in 2006 for his service to the community through charity fundraisers.

Johnson later became a highly successful mushroom grower in Wanneroo, Western Australia.
