= Lloyd Burgmann =

Australian rules footballer

Personal information
- Full name: Lloyd Burgmann
- Born: 2 July 1952 (age 74)
- Original team: Katandra
- Height: 183 cm (6 ft 0 in)
- Weight: 81.5 kg (180 lb)

Playing career^{1}
Years	Club	Games (Goals)
1970–72	Melbourne	30 (41)
- ^{1} Playing statistics correct to the end of 1972.

Lloyd Burgmann (born 2 July 1952) is a former Australian rules footballer who played with Melbourne in the Victorian Football League (VFL).
