= Eddie Ford =

Australian rules footballer (1917–1946)

Personal information
- Full name: Edwin Bertram Ford
- Born: 22 September 1917; Shepparton, Victoria
- Died: 13 July 1946 (aged 28); Mooroopna, Victoria
- Original team: Shepparton (CGFL)
- Height: 185 cm (6 ft 1 in)
- Weight: 82 kg (181 lb)

Playing career^{1}
Years	Club	Games (Goals)
1942–1943	Richmond	4 (0)
- ^{1} Playing statistics correct to the end of 1943.

Edwin Bertram Ford (22 September 1917 – 13 July 1946) was an Australian rules footballer who played with Richmond in the Victorian Football League (VFL) during the 1940s.

== Family ==
The son of Bertram Seymour Ford (1890-1974), and Joannah/Hannah Ford (1889-1980), née Shortis, Edwin Bertram Ford was born at Shepparton, Victoria on 22 September 1917.

== Football ==
Essendon apparently signed Ford back in 1937.

=== Richmond (VFL) ===
Recruited in 1941, he spent four seasons (1941 to 1944) with Richmond, employed with the Metropolitan Fire Brigade, and playing in 4 senior games (0 goals), and 19 games (8 goals) with the Seconds. He made his senior debut against Melbourne at Punt Road in the second round of the 1942 VFL season, as Richmond amassed 196 to fall just three points short of their club record. The following week he appeared in his club's win over Collingwood but didn't play again for the rest of the year. In 1943 he played two further games, both against the same opponents from the previous season. He then returned home to the country, where he worked as a farmer.

=== Tungamah (MVFL) ===
In 1945 he was playing with the Tungamah Football Club in the Murray Valley Football League.

=== Katandra (CGVFL) ===
In 1946 he was the captain-coach of the Katandra Football Club in the Central Goulburn Valley Football League. Ford finished second in the league's 1946 best and fairest award.

== Death ==
On Saturday, 13 July 1946, during the third quarter of the Ardmona-Katandra GVFL match, Ford collided with an opposition player (Hugh Allan Russell). Although stunned, Ford stayed on the field for the rest of the match. Once home after the match, he became ill, and was taken to Mooroopna Hospital where he died later that evening.

== Memorial ==
In June 1953, a new set of dressing sheds, dedicated to Ford, were opened at Katandra West.
