= Les Bartlett =

Australian rules footballer

Personal information
- Born: 27 September 1949 (age 77)
- Original team: Katandra
- Debut: Round 5, 1968, Footscray vs. Melbourne, at Western Oval
- Height: 188 cm (6 ft 2 in)
- Weight: 88 kg (194 lb)
- Position: Half back flank

Playing career^{1}
| Years | Club | Games (Goals) |
| 1968–1975 | Footscray | 60 (18) |
- ^{1} Playing statistics correct to the end of 1975.

Les D. Bartlett (born 27 September 1949) is a former Australian rules footballer. He played with Footscray, now known as the Western Bulldogs, in the Victorian Football League (VFL) mostly as a half-back flanker.

He was recruited from Katandra after they won the 1966 Benalla Tungamah Football League premiership and Bartlett also won Katandra's best and fairest award. His playing measurements were 188 cm and 88 kg, which for the time would have been considered tall for a flanker.

Bartlett managed 60 senior games in eight seasons, with his best year being in 1972, when he played 20 senior VFL matches.
