= 2016 SANFL season =

Australian rules football season

- Teams: 10
- Premiers: Sturt; 14th premiership
- Minor premiers: Woodville-West Torrens; 6th minor premiership
- Magarey Medallist: Zane Kirkwood; Sturt (24 votes)
- Ken Farmer Medallist: Brett Eddy; South Adelaide (68 goals)

Attendance
- Matches played: 96
- Total attendance: 279,699 (2,914 per match)
- Highest: 30,213 (Grand Final, Woodville-West Torrens vs Sturt)

The 2016 South Australian National Football League season (officially the SANFL IGA League) was the 137th season of the South Australian National Football League (SANFL) Australian rules football competition.

Two key new rules to be introduced for the 2016 season are:

- Interchange rotations to be restricted to a total of fifty per team per game.
- A free kick to be awarded against a player who kicks or handpasses the ball if it goes out of bounds without being touched by another player.

Both rules were more aggressive variants of similar rule changes later made in the AFL in 2016: the AFL limited interchanges to ninety per game, and adopted a stricter interpretation of deliberate out of bounds without automatically applying it to all untouched disposals out of bounds.

The season commenced on 24 March and concluded with the Grand Final on 25 September. Sturt won their 14th premiership and first in 14 years, defeating minor premiers Woodville-West Torrens by 27 points in the Grand Final at Adelaide Oval.

== Premiership season ==
=== Round 1 ===
	Round 1
Thursday 24 March (7:40 pm)	Norwood 15.10 (100)	def.	Port Adelaide 12.3 (75)	Norwood Oval (crowd: 5,112)
Friday 25 March (2:10 pm)	South Adelaide 13.7 (85)	def.	Glenelg 11.10 (76)	Hickinbotham Oval (crowd: 3,859)
Friday 25 March (2:15 pm)	Central District 24.10 (154)	def.	North Adelaide 6.11 (47)	Elizabeth Oval (crowd: 4,544)
Saturday 26 March (2:10 pm)	West Adelaide 7.8 (50)	def. by	Adelaide 18.16 (124)	Richmond Oval (crowd: 2,162)
Monday 28 March (2:10 pm)	Sturt 10.6 (66)	def. by	Woodville-West Torrens 16.9 (105)	Unley Oval (crowd: 3,386)

=== Round 2 ===
	Round 2
Sunday 2 April (1:40 pm)	Adelaide 15.14 (104)	def.	Port Adelaide 10.14 (74)	Mannum Oval (crowd: 2,323)
Sunday 2 April (2:10 pm)	Glenelg 21.14 (140)	def.	West Adelaide 9.11 (65)	Glenelg Oval (crowd: 2,803)
Sunday 2 April (2:10 pm)	South Adelaide 14.12 (96)	def.	Woodville-West Torrens 8.5 (53)	Hickinbotham Oval (crowd: 1,611)
Sunday 2 April (2:10 pm)	North Adelaide 18.10 (118)	def.	Norwood 8.13 (61)	Prospect Oval (crowd: 3,009)
Byes: Central District, Sturt

=== Round 3 ===
	Round 3
Saturday 9 April (2:10 pm)	Port Adelaide 21.7 (133)	def.	North Adelaide 13.12 (90)	Alberton Oval (crowd: 2,088)
Sunday 10 April (1:40 pm)	Sturt 11.16 (82)	def.	Central District 9.7 (61)	Unley Oval (crowd: 2,442)
Sunday 10 April (2:10 pm)	South Adelaide 22.6 (138)	def.	West Adelaide 10.7 (67)	Hickinbotham Oval (crowd: 1,374)
Sunday 10 April (2:10 pm)	Woodville-West Torrens 8.5 (53)	def. by	Adelaide 14.12 (96)	Woodville Oval (crowd: 4,252)
Byes: Glenelg, Norwood

=== Round 4 ===
	Round 4
Friday 15 April (7:40 pm)	Norwood 10.14 (74)	def.	Glenelg 10.8 (68)	Norwood Oval (crowd: 3,741)
Saturday 16 April (2:10 pm)	Central District 11.11 (77)	def. by	South Adelaide 17.6 (108)	Elizabeth Oval (crowd: 2,037)
Sunday 17 April (2:10 pm)	West Adelaide 6.12 (48)	def. by	Sturt 14.9 (93)	Richmond Oval (crowd: 2,021)
Sunday 17 April (2:10 pm)	Woodville-West Torrens 11.9 (75)	def.	North Adelaide 9.9 (63)	Woodville Oval (crowd: 2,020)
Byes: Adelaide, Port Adelaide

=== Round 5 ===
	Round 5
Friday 22 April (7:40 pm)	Norwood 8.9 (57)	def. by	Sturt 11.9 (75)	Norwood Oval (crowd: 3,242)
Sunday 24 April (2:10 pm)	Glenelg 13.8 (86)	def. by	Adelaide 17.14 (116)	Glenelg Oval (crowd: 3,787)
Sunday 24 April (2:10 pm)	Port Adelaide 9.8 (62)	def. by	Central District 13.14 (92)	Alberton Oval (crowd: 2,629)
Monday 25 April (2:10 pm)	West Adelaide 4.6 (30)	def. by	Woodville-West Torrens 15.13 (103)	Adelaide Oval (crowd: 3,119)
Byes: North Adelaide, South Adelaide

=== Round 6 ===
	Round 6
Saturday 30 April (12:10 pm)	Central District 12.10 (82)	def.	Norwood 4.10 (34)	Elizabeth Oval (crowd: 1,908)
Sunday 1 May (2:10 pm)	North Adelaide 17.8 (110)	def.	Glenelg 11.11 (77)	Prospect Oval (crowd: 1,870)
Sunday 1 May (2:10 pm)	South Adelaide 14.7 (91)	def.	Adelaide 13.12 (90)	Hickinbotham Oval (crowd: 1,233)
Sunday 1 May (2:10 pm)	Sturt 18.15 (123)	def.	Port Adelaide 9.6 (60)	Unley Oval (crowd: 2,203)
Byes: West Adelaide, Woodville-West Torrens

=== Round 7 ===
	Round 7
Friday 6 May (7:10 pm)	Glenelg 9.12 (66)	def. by	Woodville-West Torrens 12.9 (81)	Glenelg Oval (crowd: 2,583)
Saturday 7 May (2:10 pm)	Port Adelaide 14.16 (100)	def.	West Adelaide 10.13 (73)	Alberton Oval (crowd: 1,403)
Saturday 7 May (2:10 pm)	South Adelaide 15.12 (102)	def.	Norwood 12.7 (79)	Hickinbotham Oval (crowd: 1,502)
Sunday 8 May (1:10 pm)	North Adelaide 9.9 (63)	def. by	Adelaide 9.13 (67)	Prospect Oval (crowd: 1,398)
Byes: Central District, Sturt

=== Round 8 ===
	Round 8
Saturday 14 May (1:40 pm)	Woodville-West Torrens 12.10 (82)	def.	Port Adelaide 6.7 (43)	Woodville Oval (crowd: 2,065)
Saturday 14 May (2:10 pm)	Glenelg 19.6 (120)	def.	Central District 13.13 (91)	Glenelg Oval (crowd: 2,154)
Saturday 14 May (2:10 pm)	Sturt 14.10 (94)	def.	South Adelaide 7.4 (46)	Unley Oval (crowd: 2,859)
Saturday 14 May (2:10 pm)	West Adelaide 11.7 (73)	def. by	North Adelaide 14.16 (100)	Richmond Oval (crowd: 1,451)
Byes: Norwood, Adelaide

=== Round 9 ===
	Round 9
Friday 20 May (7:40 pm)	Norwood 13.13 (91)	def.	West Adelaide 10.4 (64)	Norwood Oval (crowd: 2,787)
Saturday 21 May (2:10 pm)	Central District 15.9 (99)	def.	Adelaide 12.4 (76)	Elizabeth Oval (crowd: 1,933)
Sunday 22 May (2:10 pm)	North Adelaide 10.8 (68)	def. by	Sturt 13.10 (88)	Prospect Oval (crowd: 1,850)
Sunday 22 May (2:10 pm)	Port Adelaide 20.11 (131)	def.	South Adelaide 12.11 (83)	Alberton Oval (crowd: 1,327)
Byes: Glenelg, Woodville-West Torrens

=== Round 10 ===
	Round 10
Saturday 4 June (2:10 pm)	Woodville-West Torrens 16.13 (109)	def.	Norwood 6.8 (44)	Woodville Oval (crowd: 2,250)
Saturday 4 June (2:10 pm)	Port Adelaide 17.6 (108)	def. by	Glenelg 19.13 (127)	Alberton Oval (crowd: 2,228)
Saturday 4 June (2:10 pm)	South Adelaide 15.9 (99)	def.	North Adelaide 10.8 (68)	Hickinbotham Oval (crowd: 1,164)
Saturday 4 June (2:10 pm)	Sturt 10.10 (70)	def.	Adelaide 9.6 (60)	Unley Oval (crowd: 3,379)
Saturday 4 June (2:10 pm)	West Adelaide 7.16 (58)	def. by	Central District 16.9 (105)	Richmond Oval (crowd: 1,466)

=== Round 11 ===
	Round 11
Sunday 12 June (1:40 pm)	Norwood 7.11 (53)	def. by	Adelaide 14.16 (100)	Norwood Oval (crowd: 3,322)
Sunday 12 June (2:10 pm)	Woodville-West Torrens 21.9 (135)	def.	Central District 7.5 (47)	Woodville Oval (crowd: 2,400)
Sunday 12 June (2:10 pm)	Port Adelaide 9.10 (64)	def. by	Sturt 12.14 (86)	Alberton Oval (crowd: 2,510)
Monday 13 June (2:10 pm)	Glenelg 10.14 (74)	def. by	North Adelaide 23.10 (148)	Glenelg Oval (crowd: 4,365)
Byes: South Adelaide, West Adelaide

=== Round 12 ===
	Round 12
Saturday 18 June (1:10 pm)	South Adelaide 14.13 (97)	def.	Port Adelaide 8.6 (54)	Hickinbotham Oval (crowd: 938)
Saturday 18 June (2:10 pm)	Norwood 8.13 (61)	def. by	Central District 13.15 (93)	Norwood Oval (crowd: 2,352)
Sunday 19 June (2:10 pm)	Glenelg 7.17 (59)	def. by	Sturt 15.8 (86)	Glenelg Oval (crowd: 3,260)
Sunday 19 June (2:10 pm)	North Adelaide 12.6 (78)	def. by	West Adelaide 13.4 (82)	Prospect Oval (crowd: 2,223)
Byes: Woodville-West Torrens, Adelaide

=== Round 13 ===
	Round 13
Saturday 25 June (2:10 pm)	Central District 17.8 (110)	def.	Adelaide 8.7 (55)	Elizabeth Oval (crowd: 3,106)
Saturday 25 June (2:10 pm)	Woodville-West Torrens 10.13 (73)	def.	South Adelaide 6.5 (41)	Woodville Oval (crowd: 1,778)
Saturday 25 June (2:10 pm)	West Adelaide 9.9 (63)	def.	Glenelg 8.13 (61)	Richmond Oval (crowd: 1,493)
Sunday 26 June (2:10 pm)	Sturt 10.7 (67)	def.	Norwood 8.12 (60)	Unley Oval (crowd: 3,762)
Byes: North Adelaide, Port Adelaide

=== Round 14 ===
	Round 14
Saturday 2 July (2:10 pm)	Central District 9.5 (59)	def. by	Port Adelaide 15.8 (98)	Elizabeth Oval (crowd: 2,030)
Saturday 2 July (2:10 pm)	Woodville-West Torrens 19.12 (126)	def.	West Adelaide 8.2 (50)	Woodville Oval (crowd: 1,598)
Saturday 2 July (2:10 pm)	North Adelaide 9.9 (63)	def. by	Adelaide 11.12 (78)	Prospect Oval (crowd: 1,835)
Saturday 2 July (2:10 pm)	Norwood 8.8 (56)	def. by	South Adelaide 12.13 (85)	Norwood Oval (crowd: 1,841)
Byes: Glenelg, Sturt

=== Round 15 ===
	Round 15
Saturday 9 July (2:10 pm)	Adelaide 13.9 (87)	def.	Sturt 11.9 (75)	Thebarton Oval (crowd: 3,123)
Saturday 9 July (2:10 pm)	Glenelg 11.8 (74)	def.	South Adelaide 9.10 (64)	Glenelg Oval (crowd: 1,998)
Saturday 9 July (2:10 pm)	North Adelaide 10.4 (64)	def. by	Woodville-West Torrens 9.16 (70)	Prospect Oval (crowd: 1,816)
Saturday 9 July (2:10 pm)	West Adelaide 7.14 (56)	def. by	Port Adelaide 19.15 (129)	Richmond Oval (crowd: 1,333)
Byes: Central District, Norwood

=== Round 16 ===
	Round 16
Saturday 16 July (1:10 pm)	Central District 9.6 (60)	def. by	Sturt 10.9 (69)	Elizabeth Oval (crowd: 2,200)
Sunday 17 July (2:10 pm)	Glenelg 15.11 (101)	def.	Adelaide 12.10 (82)	Glenelg Oval (crowd: 2,849)
Sunday 17 July (2:10 pm)	Norwood 17.14 (116)	def.	North Adelaide 12.10 (82)	Norwood Oval (crowd: 2,589)
Sunday 17 July (2:10 pm)	Port Adelaide 12.10 (82)	def.	Woodville-West Torrens 6.5 (41)	Alberton Oval (crowd: 2,741)
Byes: South Adelaide, West Adelaide

=== Round 17 ===
	Round 17
Saturday 23 July (2:10 pm)	Woodville-West Torrens 10.13 (73)	def.	Adelaide 8.5 (53)	Woodville Oval (crowd: 1,850)
Saturday 23 July (2:10 pm)	South Adelaide 15.6 (96)	def.	Central District 11.9 (75)	Hickinbotham Oval (crowd: 1,487)
Saturday 23 July (2:10 pm)	Sturt 19.7 (121)	def.	West Adelaide 4.8 (32)	Unley Oval (crowd: 2,290)
Sunday 24 July (1:40 pm)	Glenelg 10.9 (69)	def.	Norwood 9.9 (63)	Glenelg Oval (crowd: 1,482)
Byes: North Adelaide, Port Adelaide

=== Round 18 ===
	Round 18
Saturday 30 July (2:10 pm)	Woodville-West Torrens 12.12 (84)	def.	Sturt 7.3 (45)	Woodville Oval (crowd: 2,677)
Saturday 30 July (2:10 pm)	North Adelaide 12.8 (80)	def. by	Central District 15.5 (95)	Prospect Oval (crowd: 1,783)
Saturday 30 July (2:10 pm)	West Adelaide 6.5 (41)	def. by	South Adelaide 21.10 (136)	Richmond Oval (crowd: 1,260)
Sunday 31 July (1:40 pm)	Port Adelaide 12.7 (79)	def. by	Adelaide 16.8 (104)	Alberton Oval (crowd: 2,289)
Byes: Glenelg, Norwood

=== Round 19 ===
	Round 19
Saturday 6 August (2:10 pm)	Central District 16.8 (104)	def.	Glenelg 10.4 (64)	Elizabeth Oval (crowd: 1,897)
Sunday 7 August (2:10 pm)	North Adelaide 7.8 (50)	def. by	Port Adelaide 16.11 (107)	Prospect Oval (crowd: 1,793)
Sunday 7 August (2:10 pm)	South Adelaide 16.6 (102)	def.	Sturt 7.11 (53)	Hickinbotham Oval (crowd: 1,279)
Sunday 7 August (2:10 pm)	West Adelaide 9.12 (66)	def. by	Norwood 12.8 (80)	Richmond Oval (crowd: 1,726)
Byes: Woodville-West Torrens, Adelaide

=== Round 20 ===
	Round 20
Saturday 13 August (1:40 pm)	Glenelg 11.13 (79)	def. by	Port Adelaide 20.14 (134)	Glenelg Oval (crowd: 2,440)
Saturday 13 August (2:10 pm)	Central District 8.6 (54)	def. by	Woodville-West Torrens 11.13 (79)	Elizabeth Oval (crowd: 1,978)
Saturday 13 August (2:10 pm)	North Adelaide 9.9 (63)	def. by	South Adelaide 18.4 (112)	Prospect Oval (crowd: 1,649)
Saturday 13 August (2:10 pm)	Norwood 11.10 (76)	def. by	Adelaide 18.10 (118)	Norwood Oval (crowd: 2,266)
Byes: Sturt, West Adelaide

=== Round 21 ===
	Round 21
Sunday 21 August (1:10 pm)	West Adelaide 13.7 (85)	def. by	Adelaide 27.17 (179)	Berri Oval (crowd: 2,059)
Sunday 21 August (2:10 pm)	Woodville-West Torrens 21.11 (137)	def.	Glenelg 10.4 (64)	Woodville Oval (crowd: 2,172)
Sunday 21 August (2:10 pm)	Port Adelaide 16.7 (103)	def.	Norwood 12.6 (78)	Alberton Oval (crowd: 2,501)
Sunday 21 August (2:10 pm)	Sturt 12.7 (79)	def.	North Adelaide 11.9 (75)	Unley Oval (crowd: 2,712)
Byes: Central District, South Adelaide

=== Round 22 ===
	Round 22
Saturday 27 August (2:10 pm)	Central District 18.8 (116)	def.	West Adelaide 11.8 (74)	Elizabeth Oval (crowd: 2,186)
Saturday 27 August (2:10 pm)	Norwood 11.9 (75)	def.	Woodville-West Torrens 6.15 (51)	Norwood Oval (crowd: 2,277)
Saturday 27 August (2:10 pm)	South Adelaide 14.16 (100)	def.	Adelaide 9.8 (62)	Hickinbotham Oval (crowd: 1,419)
Saturday 27 August (2:10 pm)	Sturt 12.14 (86)	drew with	Glenelg 13.8 (86)	Unley Oval (crowd: 2,573)
Byes: North Adelaide, Port Adelaide

== Ladder ==
2016 SANFL Ladder
Pos	Team	Pld	W	L	D	PF	PA	PP	Pts
1	Woodville-West Torrens	18	14	4	0	1530	1079	58.64	28
2	South Adelaide	18	14	4	0	1681	1286	56.66	28
3	Sturt (P)	18	13	4	1	1458	1214	54.57	27
4	Adelaide	18	11	7	0	1651	1401	54.10	22
5	Central District	18	10	8	0	1574	1398	52.96	20
6	Port Adelaide	18	9	9	0	1636	1524	51.77	18
7	Glenelg	18	6	11	1	1491	1697	46.77	13
8	Norwood	18	6	12	0	1258	1527	45.17	12
9	North Adelaide	18	4	14	0	1430	1640	46.58	8
10	West Adelaide	18	2	16	0	1077	2020	34.78	4

Rules for classification: 1) points; 2) percentage; 3) number of points for.
(P) Premiers

== Finals series ==
=== Qualifying and Elimination Finals ===
	Elimination Final
Saturday 3 September (12:10 pm)	Adelaide 19.11 (125)	def.	Central District 7.11 (53)	Adelaide Oval (crowd: see below)

	Qualifying Final
Saturday 3 September (3:10 pm)	South Adelaide 7.9 (51)	def. by	Sturt 11.12 (78)	Adelaide Oval (crowd: 8,351)

=== Semi-finals ===
	First Semi-final
Sunday 11 September (12:10 pm)	South Adelaide 13.8 (86)	def. by	Adelaide 22.8 (140)	Adelaide Oval (crowd: see below)

	Second Semi-final
Sunday 11 September (3:10 pm)	Woodville-West Torrens 12.12 (84)	def.	Sturt 8.12 (60)	Adelaide Oval (crowd: 9,029)

=== Preliminary final ===
	Preliminary Final
Sunday 18 September (2:10 pm)	Sturt 15.13 (103)	def.	Adelaide 10.8 (68)	Adelaide Oval (crowd: 6,645)

=== Grand Final ===
2016 SANFL Grand Final
Sunday 25 September (2:40 pm)	Woodville-West Torrens	def. by	Sturt	Adelaide Oval (crowd: 30,213)	Report
1.4 (10); 3.5 (23); 5.6 (36); 7.7 (49)	Q1; Q2; Q3; Final	1.1 (7); 4.2 (26); 8.2 (50); 12.4 (76)	Umpires: Haussen, Hundertmark, Crosby; Jack Oatey Medal: Jack Stephens (Sturt); Television broadcast: Seven Network
5: Wundke; 1: McGregor, Petrenko	Goals	3: Beard, Greenslade; 2: Lienert; 1: Hansen, Stephens, Kirkwood
Petrenko, O'Brien, Wundke, Boyd	Best	Stephens, Kirkwood, Riley, Battersby, Beard, Greenslade, Martin, McMahon

== Awards and premiers ==
=== Awards ===
- The Magarey Medal (awarded to the best and fairest player in the home and away season) was won by Zane Kirkwood of Sturt, who polled 24 votes. It was Kirkwood's second Magarey Medal having previously won in 2014.
- The Ken Farmer Medal (awarded to the leading goalkicker in the home and away season) was won by Brett Eddy of South Adelaide. He kicked 68 goals in the 2016 home and away season.
- The Stanley H. Lewis Memorial Trophy (awarded to the best performing club in the League, Reserves and Under 18 competitions) was won by Woodville West-Torrens, with 2975 points, which was 775 points ahead of second-place South Adelaide. It was the Eagles' 5th trophy having previously won in 1993, 2000, 2013 and 2015.
- The R.O. Shearman Medal (awarded to the player adjudged best by the 10 SANFL club coaches each game) was won by Jared Petrenko of Woodville West-Torrens.
- Woodville-West Torrens were the league minor premiers, finishing top of the ladder at the end of the home and away season with 14 wins and 4 losses. It is the club's 6th minor premiership in the SANFL and their 2nd in succession.

=== Premiers ===
- Sturt were the League premiers, defeating Woodville-West Torrens by 27 points.
- North Adelaide were the Reserves premiers, defeating Woodville-West Torrens by 20 points.
- Glenelg were the Under 18 premiers, defeating North Adelaide by 1 point.

== Advertiser SANFL Team of the Year ==
2016 Advertiser SANFL Team of the Year
B:	Patrick Giuffreda (Woodville-West Torrens)	Luke Thompson (vc) (Woodville-West Torrens)	Tom Fields (South Adelaide)
HB:	Jarred Allmond (Woodville-West Torrens)	Fraser Evans (Sturt)	Matthew Goldsworthy (Woodville-West Torrens)
C:	Kane Mitchell (Port Adelaide)	Zane Kirkwood (c) (Sturt)	Nick O'Brien (Woodville-West Torrens)
HF:	Josh Scott (Glenelg)	Kory Beard (Sturt)	Justin Hocking (Central District)
F:	Travis Schiller (Central District)	Brett Eddy (South Adelaide)	Mark Evans (Sturt)
Foll:	Sam Baulderstone	Chris Jansen (Central District)	Jared Petrenko (Woodville-West Torrens)
Int:	Cam Ellis-Yolmen (Adelaide)	Brede Seccull (South Adelaide)	James Battersby (Sturt)
Coach:	Martin Mattner (Sturt)		
