= Jono Beech =

Australian rules footballer

Personal information
- Full name: Jonathon Beech
- Born: 16 September 1990 (age 36)
- Original teams: Barmera-Monash (RFL); West Adelaide (SANFL)
- Draft: No. 31, 2016 rookie draft
- Height: 187 cm (6 ft 2 in)
- Weight: 85 kg (187 lb)
- Position: Forward / midfielder

Playing career^{1}
| Years | Club | Games (Goals) |
| 2016–2017 | Adelaide | 3 (1) |
- ^{1} Playing statistics correct to the end of 2017.

Career highlights
- SANFL premiership player: 2015; West Adelaide best and fairest: 2014

Jonathon "Jono" Beech (born 16 September 1990) is a former professional Australian rules footballer who played for the Adelaide Football Club in the Australian Football League (AFL).

== SANFL career ==
Beech made his SANFL debut for West Adelaide in 2008. Beech is a strong-marking forward, who can also run through the midfield. Over the course of his SANFL career for West Adelaide he played 129 games and kicked 148 goals, also applying for the AFL draft 8 times but never being drafted by any AFL club. He began to gain notoriety in the 2014 season, and trained with Adelaide for a week at the end of the season, hoping to be drafted by the club. Once again, he was overlooked.

Beech was a member of West Adelaide's 2015 SANFL premiership team and kicked 35 goals in 2015 to finish eighth in the Ken Farmer Medal. He also averaged 18 possessions, seven marks, six score involvements and four inside 50s across 22 SANFL games. Beech ranked No.1 in the SANFL for total marks and third for contested marks. After this, Beech was drafted in the second round of the 2016 AFL rookie draft. He was Adelaide's second pick in the draft.

== AFL career ==
Beech spent his entire first season playing for Adelaide's reserves team in the SANFL. He made his debut in the fifty-seven point win against St Kilda at Adelaide Oval in round twelve of the 2017 AFL season, in which he kicked his first AFL goal. He played three games for the Crows, but was dropped back into the SANFL in round sixteen. He was delisted by Adelaide at the conclusion of the 2017 season.

== Statistics ==
Statistics are correct to end of the 2017 season

Legend
| G | Goals | K | Kicks | D | Disposals | T | Tackles |
| B | Behinds | H | Handballs | M | Marks |

| Season | Team | No. | Games | Totals | | | | | | | Averages (per game) | | | | | | |
| Season | Team | No. | Games | G | B | K | H | D | M | T | G | B | K | H | D | M | T |
|---|---|---|---|---|---|---|---|---|---|---|---|---|---|---|---|---|---|
| 2016 | Adelaide | 1 | 0 | — | — | — | — | — | — | — | — | — | — | — | — | — | — |
| 2017 | Adelaide | 1 | 3 | 1 | 0 | 15 | 23 | 38 | 10 | 9 | 0.3 | 0.0 | 5.0 | 7.7 | 12.7 | 3.3 | 3.0 |
| Career | | | 3 | 1 | 0 | 15 | 23 | 38 | 10 | 9 | 0.3 | 0.0 | 5.0 | 7.7 | 12.7 | 3.3 | 3.0 |
