= Joe Hickey (footballer) =

Australian rules footballer (1929–2021)

Personal information
- Full name: Joseph Hickey
- Born: 7 March 1929
- Died: 11 November 2021
- Original teams: Katandra, Shepparton
- Height: 188 cm (6 ft 2 in)
- Weight: 87 kg (192 lb)
- Position: Forward

Playing career^{1}
Years	Club	Games (Goals)
1952–1953	Fitzroy	26 (48)
- ^{1} Playing statistics correct to the end of 1953.

Career highlights
- 1953 - 5th in VFL Goalkicking (40 goals)

Joe Hickey (7 March 1929 – 11 November 2021) was an Australian rules footballer who played with Fitzroy in the Victorian Football League (VFL).

== Family ==
He is the son of Daniel James Hickey (1890-1954), and Josephine Marie Hickey (1894-1988), née Wilson, Joseph Hickey was born on 7 March 1929.

He married Audrey May Hoare in 1955.

Joe Hickey’s granddaughter is an Australian Olympian, Madeline Heiner; and, according to Joe, she acquired all her running ability from him.

== Football ==
Hickey originally played with Katandra in the Central Goulburn Valley Football League from 1947 to 1949.

Hickey was involved in a permit dispute when trying to get a clearance from Kantandra to Shepparton in 1950.

Hickey was a key forward with Shepparton, who he played with in 1950 and kicked 16 goals in one match and 82 for the season, plus 7 in the finals to finish with 89 goals.

In 1951, Hickey only kicked 30 goals for Shepparton as his season was interrupted by an ongoing permits dispute.

He later played in Shepparton's 1951 premiership team, alongside his brother, Denis.

=== Fitzroy (VFL) ===
Recruited from Shepparton, Hickey made 13 appearances for Fitzroy in 1952, including their preliminary final loss to Collingwood. In 1953, he was Fitzroy's leading goal-kicker with 40 goals, including 8 eight goals against North Melbourne at Brunswick Street Oval.

=== After Fitzroy ===
Following the death of his father in a road accident on 25 February 1954, Hickey decided to work at his Invergordon farm full-time and returned to the Goulburn Valley Football League to play with Shepparton.

Hickey won the 1955 Murray Football Netball League's goalkicking award with 63 goals for the Berrigan Football Club, then kicked 13 goals in 1956.
