= Max Orr =

Australian rules footballer

Personal information
- Full name: Maxwell Charles Orr
- Born: 9 January 1931; Ballarat, Victoria
- Died: 12 September 1955 (aged 24) near Melton
- Original team: East Ballarat
- Height: 178 cm (5 ft 10 in)
- Weight: 73 kg (161 lb)

Playing career^{1}
Years	Club	Games (Goals)
1952–1953	Melbourne	7 (4)
- ^{1} Playing statistics correct to the end of 1953.

Maxwell Charles Orr (9 January 1931 – 12 September 1955) was an Australian rules footballer who played with Melbourne in the Victorian Football League (VFL).

== Family ==
The son of Charles Walter Orr (1872-1953), and Marjorie Elizabeth Bartlett Orr (1900-1998), née Beames, Maxwell Charles Orr was born at Ballarat on 9 January 1931.

He married Helen Ivy Mills in 1950.

== Football ==
Orr, a half forward, played junior football for East Ballarat, before arriving in Melbourne.

He made five appearances for Melbourne in the 1952 VFL season but played only two games the following year.

In 1954 he returned to the country and began playing for the Ballarat Football Club.

== Cricket ==
While in the city he was also a wicket-keeper for the MCC.

== Death ==
On 12 September 1955, Orr died in a car accident on the Western Highway, near Melton, on his way to his home in Creswick.

The panel van he was driving collided with a semi trailer. His father was injured; but Orr, who was due to play for Ballarat in a semi final later that week, was killed instantly.
