= Katandra West =

- Town
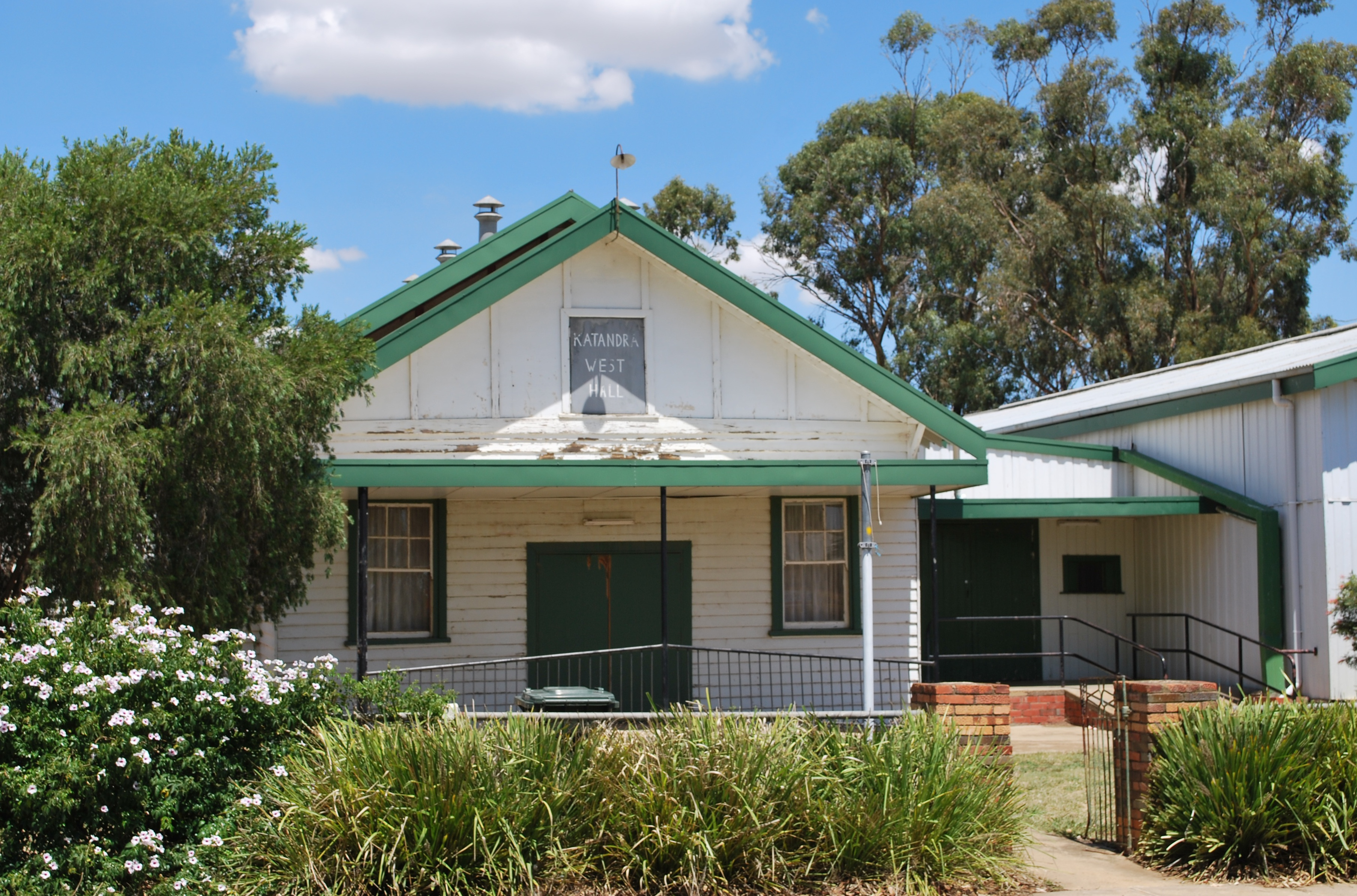
- Public hall, 2010

- Interactive map of Katandra West
- Coordinates: 36°13′41″S 145°33′29″E
- Country: Australia
- State: Victoria
- Region: Hume
- LGA: City of Greater Shepparton

Government
  - State electorate: Shepparton
  - Federal division: Nicholls

Population
  - Total: 476 (2016 census)
- Postcode: 3634

Katandra West is a town in Victoria, Australia. It is located in the City of Greater Shepparton. At the 2016 census, Katandra West had a population of 476.

== Sport and recreation ==
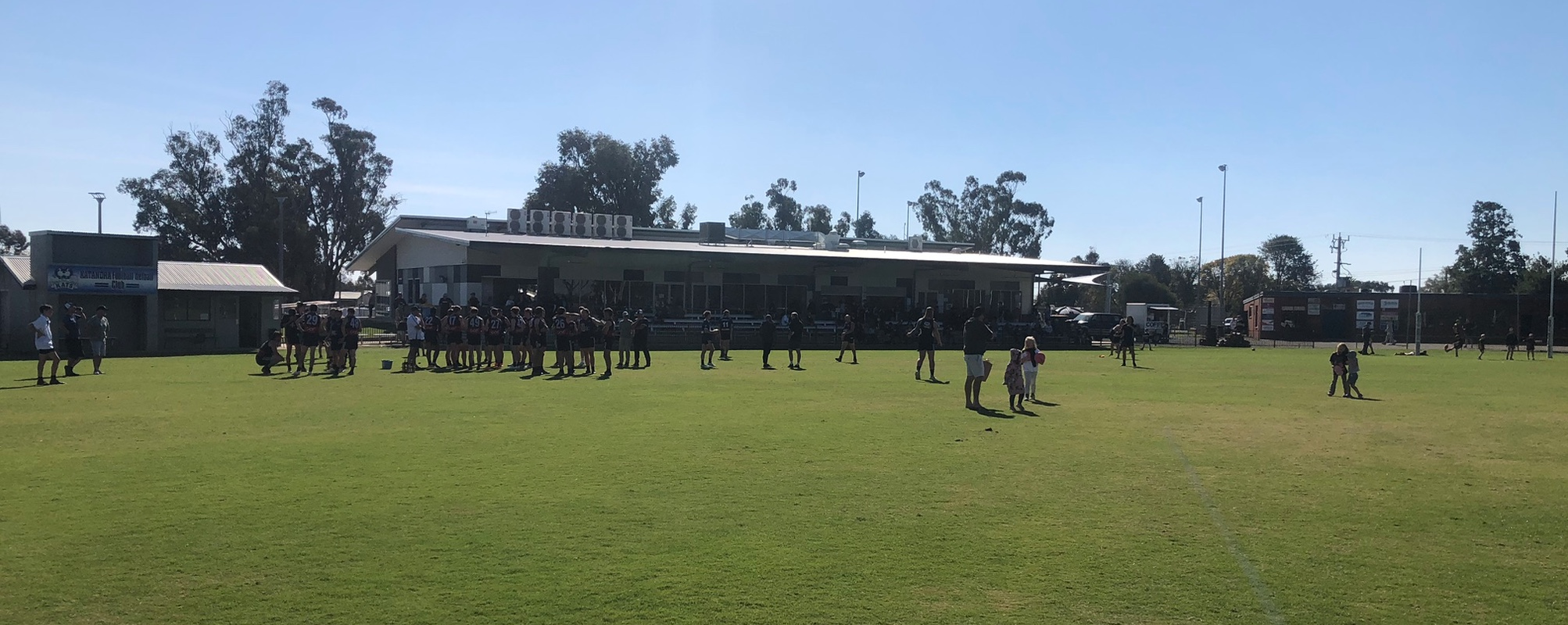
Katandra Football Netball Club Clubrooms

The town is the home base of the Katandra Football Club and Katandra Cricket Club.

Katandra has fielded football and netball teams in the Picola & District Football League since 1996.

Katandra Cricket Club play in the Shepparton League, being very successful in recent years.
