= Nathan Fitzgerald =

Australian rules footballer (1999–2026)

- Fitzgerald with Epping in 2022

Personal information
- Full name: Nathan Andrew Fitzgerald
- Nickname: Fitzy
- Born: 23 February 1999
- Died: 6 July 2026 (aged 27); Parkville, Victoria, Australia

Playing career
Years	Club	Games (Goals)
2021−2026	Epping seniors	12 (0)
2021−2026	Epping reserves	34 (1)
Total		46 (1)

Nathan Andrew Fitzgerald (23 February 1999 – 6 July 2026) was an Australian rules footballer and teacher who played for Epping in the Northern Football Netball League (NFNL). He died after sustaining head injuries during a match.

== Career ==
Fitzgerald made his debut for the Epping Football Netball Club in 2021. When he re-signed for the 2022 season, the club described him as "an awesome bloke to have around the group" who "always fulfils any role given to him".

During the 2026 season, Fitzgerald played nine matches for Epping in the NFNL reserves competition and was named as one of the best-on-ground players four times. Fitzgerald's on-field form in his final month of playing was later described by teammate Coby Eyre as the best of his life.

== Death ==
On 4 July 2026, Fitzgerald was playing for Epping against Lalor at Lalor Recreation Reserve in a reserves match. During the third quarter, Fitzgerald clashed heads with a teammate after attempting to tackle an opponent, before being struck in the head by either a knee or a football boot, then hit his head on the covered cricket pitch in the middle of the ground.

Trainers and paramedics performed CPR and defibrillation for almost an hour before Fitzgerald was transported to the Royal Melbourne Hospital in a critical condition. The reserves match was abandoned with Epping leading 11.5 (71) to Lalor's 2.4 (16), while the senior men's match that was scheduled to follow was cancelled.

The following day, Epping announced that Fitzgerald's condition had deteriorated and he was receiving end-of-life care. On the evening of 6 July, Fitzgerald's life support was turned off. He was 27 years old.

=== Tributes ===
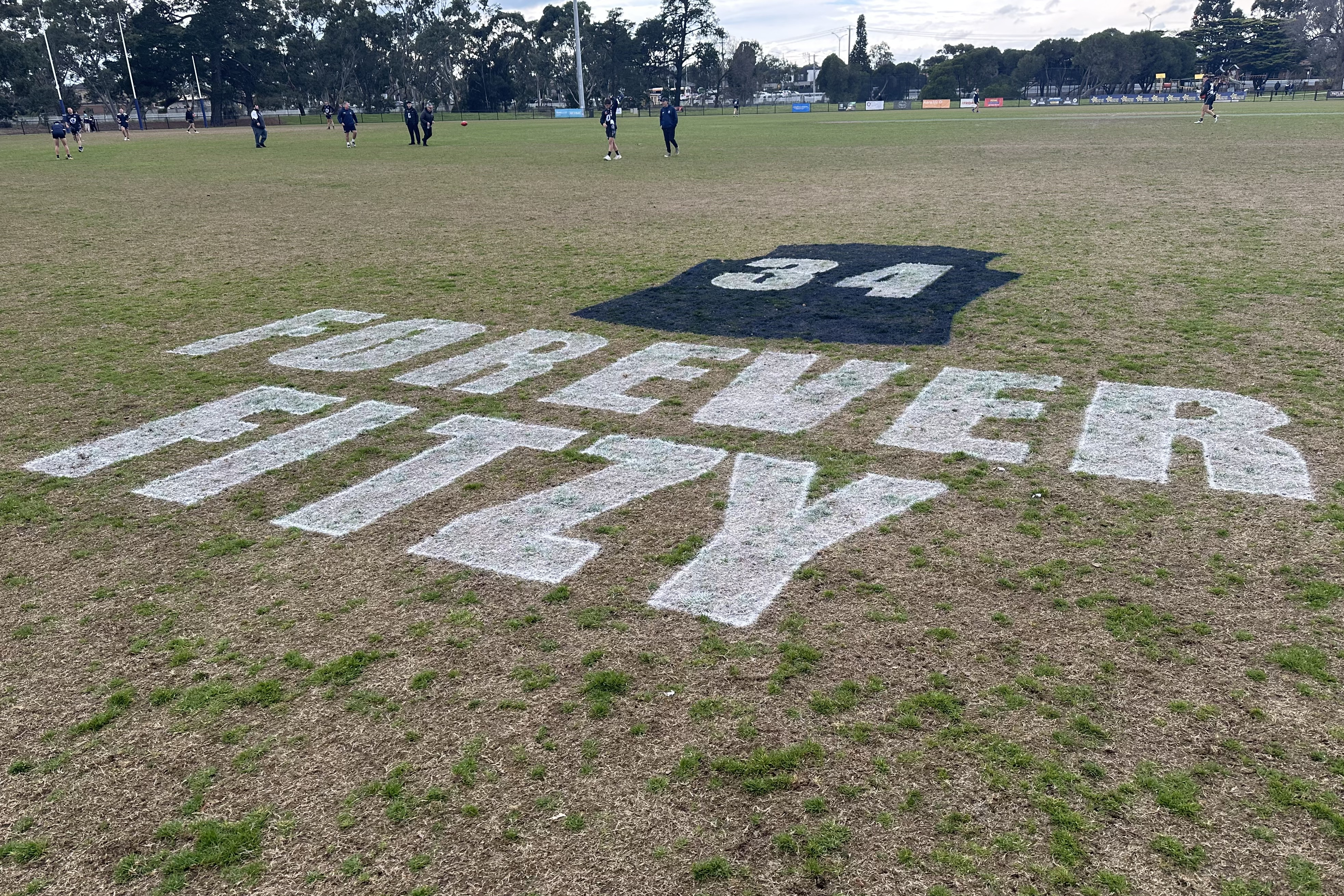
Tribute to Fitzgerald painted on the grass at Epping Recreation Reserve prior to a memorial service on 11 July 2026

Tributes began after the announcement that Fitzgerald had entered end-of-life care and continued following his death. Epping wrote that Fitzgerald's "beautiful smile, caring nature, kindness, loyalty, and love for football touched so many lives, and his memory will forever remain in our hearts". His jumper number, 34, was retired by the club.

The NFNL said the "situation has been felt by the entire football community and beyond" and was "a solemn reminder of just how precious life is". Nine Victorian metropolitan football leagues released a joint statement, writing that they "stand together in support of the NFNL and the broader football community during this incredibly difficult time". Mernda Central College, where Fitzgerald taught maths and science, said he "cared deeply about young people, built strong and meaningful relationships and made those around him feel seen, supported and valued".

A memorial service took place on 11 July, prior to the start of the NFNL senior men's match between Epping and Heidelberg West, in front of a crowd of 1,000 people at Epping Recreation Reserve. Epping's reserves team voted unanimously not to play its match; all other NFNL matches continued as scheduled. Other football clubs in Victoria ran through banners that honoured Fitzgerald.

Australian Football League (AFL) CEO Andrew Dillon announced that all 18 AFL clubs would wear black armbands during round 18 as a mark of respect. Fitzgerald supported Richmond, with a minute's silence held before the match between Melbourne and Richmond.

=== Investigation ===
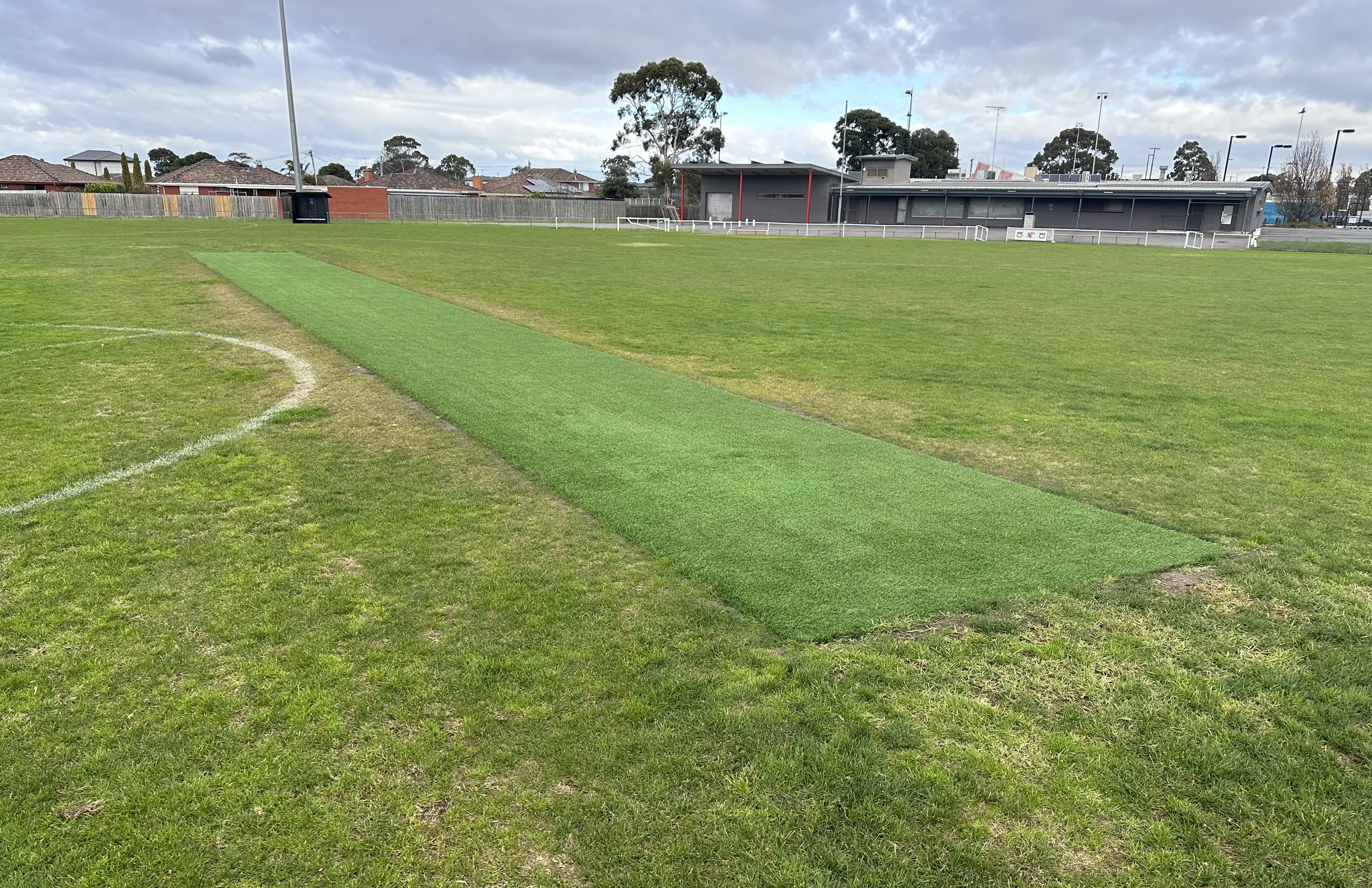
The cricket pitch at Lalor Recreation Reserve, pictured after Fitzgerald's death

WorkSafe Victoria announced an investigation following Fitzgerald's death. Victoria Police said there was "no evidence of criminality during the incident". The NFNL said it wouldn't "be drawn into discussions regarding ground conditions for local football".

Fitzgerald's death has led to calls for a review into how cricket pitches are covered during the football season. The pitch at Lalor Recreation Reserve was covered by synthetic grass and sand, with the centre ball-up moved away from the pitch to avoid players suffering injuries. Whittlesea City Council, which manages Lalor Recreation Reserve, said the cover was designed "in accordance with AFL/Cricket Australia performance standards". In response to Fitzgerald's death, Mornington Peninsula Shire Council initiated a review into the grounds with covered pitches that it manages and added additional crumb rubber to any venue used for senior football.

Epping president Luke De Vincentis said although the cricket pitch was covered, it was "still substantially harder than other parts of the oval" and he supported an investigation into how pitches would be treated at multi-use venues in the future. Annitta Siliato, the executive director of Concussion Legacy Foundation Australia, called for concrete-based cricket pitches to be "eliminated".
