= Doug Magor =

Australian rules footballer

Personal information
- Full name: Doug Magor
- Born: 24 May 1947
- Died: 11 January 1969 (aged 21); Bateman's Bay
- Original team: South Melbourne Reserves
- Height: 180 cm (5 ft 11 in)
- Weight: 80 kg (176 lb)

Playing career^{1}
Years	Club	Games (Goals)
1967	South Melbourne	7 (0)
1968	Footscray	2 (1)
Total		9 (1)
- ^{1} Playing statistics correct to the end of 1968.

Doug Magor (24 May 1947 – 11 January 1969) was an Australian rules footballer who played with South Melbourne and Footscray in the Victorian Football League (VFL) during the 1960s.

Magor was a reserves player at South Melbourne before breaking into the senior in 1967. He made his first appearance in a drawn game with Carlton at Lake Oval and played six further times that year. The following season he crossed to Footscray but would play only two games. He kicked his only career goal on his Footscray debut, against North Melbourne at Arden Street.

In January 1969, Magor was killed in a car accident near Batemans Bay.
