= Katandra Football Club =

Australian rules football and netball club

Katandra

Names
- Full name: Katandra Football Netball Club
- Nickname: Kats

Club details
- Founded: 1911; 115 years ago
- Colours
- Competition: Picola & District FNL
- Premierships: 20 (1913, 1914, 1950, 1951, 1955, 1956, 1957, 1958, 1966, 1973, 1974, 1975, 1977, 1983, 1984, 1990, 1992, 1998, 2003, 2004)
- Ground: Katandra West Recreation Reserve, 238 Hickey Rd.

Uniforms
Home

Other information
- Official website: Kantandra FNC

The Katandra Football Netball Club, nicknamed the Kats, is an Australian rules football and netball club based in the small Victorian town of Katandra West. The club teams currently compete in the Picola & District Football League.

== History ==
After much talk in the district for many years the Katandra Football club was founded in 1911 and the initial club colours were blue and white. Their first opponents were Rockville and Pine Grove.

Reforming after World War I in May 1922, the club played on an oval next to the Memorial Hall and played in the Dookie & District Football Association from 1922 to 1925.

Katandra FC reformed in late 1934 and applied to join the Goulburn Valley Second Eighteens Football Association for the 1935 season, but were rejected.

In 1935 the club reformed to play in the Chaney Cup, prior to joining the Goulburn Valley Second Eighteens Football Association in 1936.

The new Katandra West Sports Ground was officially opened by Sir John Gladstone Black McDonald in March 1937.

In July 1946, former Richmond player and Katandra captain, Eddie Ford collided with an Ardmona player, but played out the game and went home, but later became ill. Ford was taken to the Mooroopna Hospital, where he later died.

In 2005, the senior football team were undefeated minor premiers, but then lost Qualifying Final, won First Semi Final, then lost the Preliminary Final.

Despite the blemish of 2012, the club has experienced success over the past decade through winning premierships in all grades of football and many grades of netball. The most recent Senior premiership was in 2004. The A Grade netball team won their first premiership in 2009, then were Runners Up in 2011, followed by winning the 2012 pennant. The Senior team recently completed a remarkable feat of completing eight seasons and ended as Preliminary Finalists. This eight season streak included two Premierships, three Runners Up and three Preliminary Finals losses. The club has not competed in finals since 2010, thought it received its first wooden spoon in 2012 after finishing last in the eight team PDFL-South East competition.

The club changed leagues following an administration disagreement between the AFL Goulburn-Valley and the Picola & District Football League.

The club wanted to remain under the AFL umbrella for player development and insurance so they joined the Murray Football League. They rejoined the Picola & District Football League in 2020.

Past players to play AFL include Footscray ruckman Les Bartlett, Melbourne back pocket Rod Grinter and Carlton best and fairest winner and former Carlton coach, David Teague.

== Football competitions timeline ==
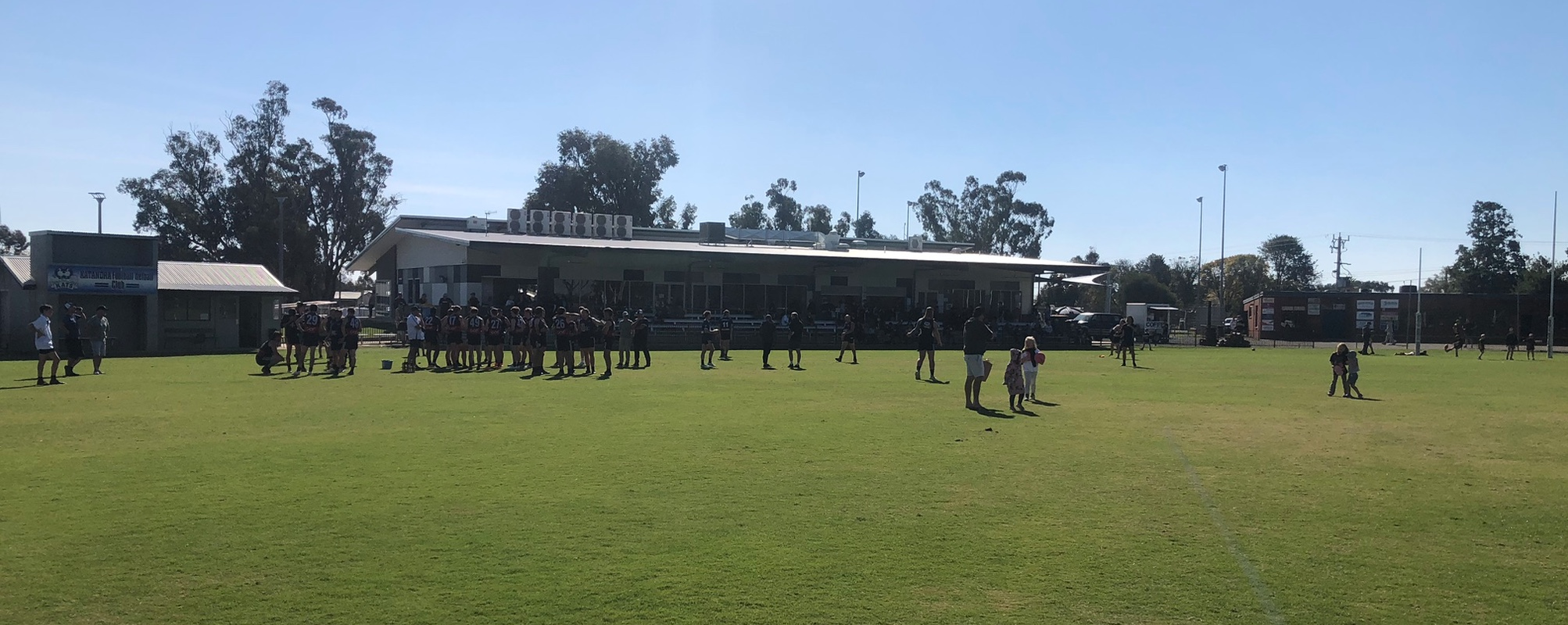
Katandra FNC Clubrooms, Victoria

Katandra FC have played in the following football competitions.

- 1911 - Katandra FC first established. Played some friendly matches against other local teams.
- 1912 - 1915: Katandra Football Association. competition abandoned midway through 1915 due to World War I.
- 1916 - 1918: Club in recess due to World War I
- 1919 - 1921: Club still in recess.
- 1922 - 1925: Club reformed in May 1922 and joined the Dookie & District Football Association.
- 1926: Dookie & DFA folds and the club goes into recess.
- 1927 - Dookie & District Football Association.
- 1928 - 1932: Katandra & District Football Association
- 1933 - 1934: The Katandra & DFA folds and Katandra FC goes into recess.
- 1935 - Chaney Cup
- 1936: Goulburn Valley Second Eighteens Football Association
- 1937 - 1941: Goulburn Valley Football Association
- 1942 - 1944: Club in recess due to World War II
- 1945 - Goulburn Valley Football Association
- 1946 - 1951: Central Goulburn Valley Football League
- 1952 - 1966: Benalla Tungamah Football League
- 1967 - 1995: Tungamah Football League
- 1996 - 2017: Picola & District Football Netball League
- 2018 - 2019: Murray Football Netball League
- 2020: Club in recess due to COVID-19
- 2021 - 2025: Picola & District Football Netball League

== Football Premierships ==
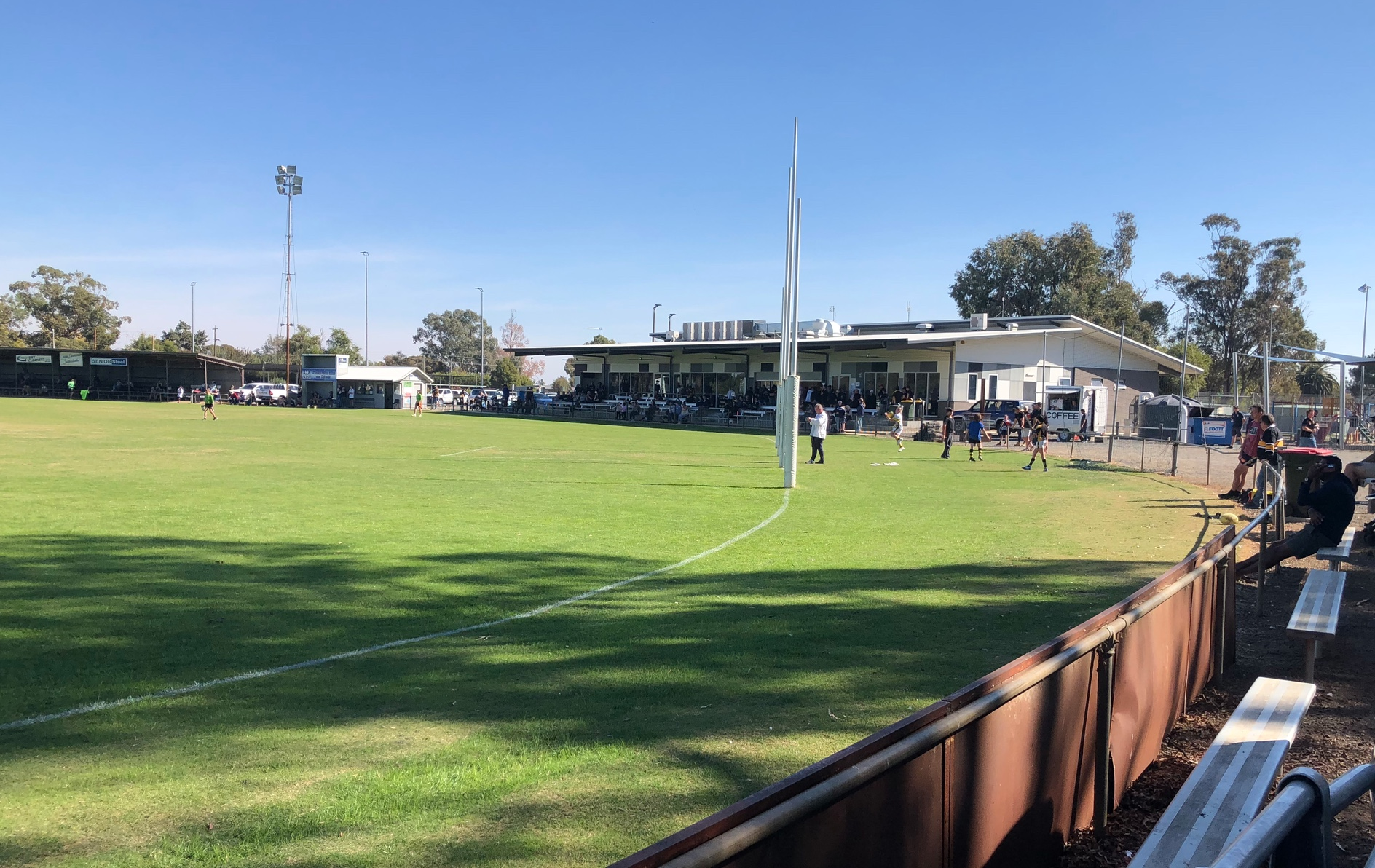
Katandra Football Netball Club & Community Hall

Seniors

- Picola & District Football League (3):
  - 1998, 2003, 2004
- Tungamah Football League (8):
  - 1973, 1974, 1975, 1977, 1983, 1984, 1990, 1992
- Benalla Tungamah Football League (5):
  - 1955, 1956, 1957, 1958, 1966
- Central Goulburn Valley Football League (2):
  - 1950, 1951
- Katandra Football Association
  - 1914 - Katandra:
  - 1913 - Katandra:

Under 17's

- Picola & District Football League
  - 2024

== Football – Runners up ==
Seniors

The club was runner-up in the –

Picola & District Football League

- 2006, 2007, 2008

Tungamah Football League

- 1970, 1971, 1972, 1978, 1979, 1980, 1989, 1991

Benalla Tungamah Football League

- 1960

Central Goulburn Valley Football League

- 1952

Katandra Football Association

- 1929 - Drumanure: 1.0 - 6 d Katandra: 0.0 - 0. Katandra did not show up for the grand final.
- 1912 - Dookie: 2.8 - 20 d Katandra: 2.3 - 15

== Football Statistics ==
Seniors

- Wooden Spoon
  - Picola & District Football League (1):
    - 2012: 8th - (4 wins, 14 losses)
    - 2013: 8th - (0 wins, 18 losses)
    - 2017: 8th - (1 win, 17 losses)
- Most consecutive losses
  - 24: From round 15, 2012 to round 3, 2014.

== Football League: Best & Fairest winners ==
Seniors

- Goulburn Valley Football Association
  - 1940 – Sandy McIntosh
- Benalla Tungamah Football League – Lawless Medal
  - 1956 & 1963: Harry Brittain
- Picola & District Football League
  - 2014 - Luke Minogue

== AFL players ==
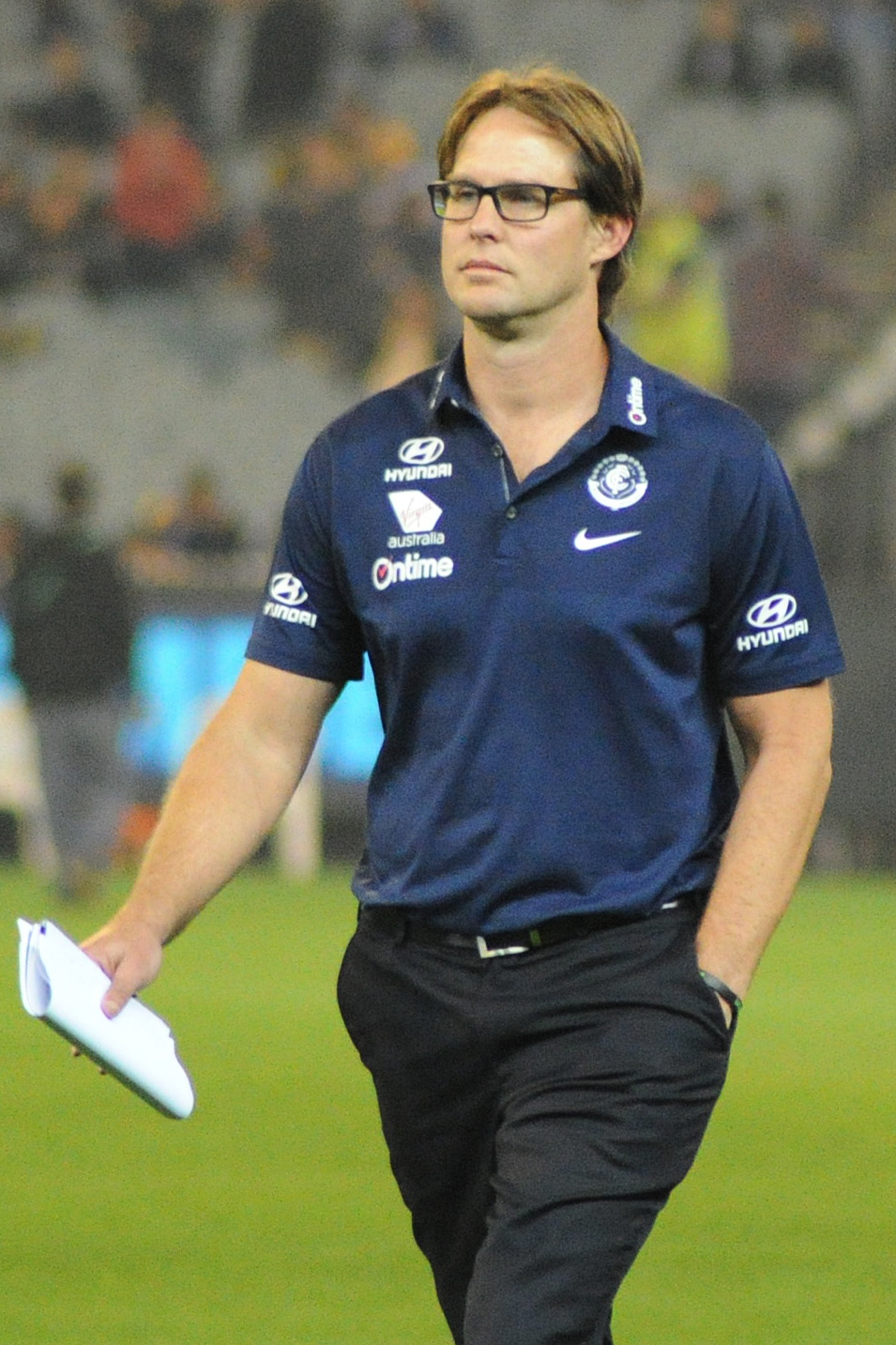
David Teague

The following footballers played with Katandra, prior to playing senior football in the VFL/AFL, and / or drafted, with the year indicating their VFL/AFL debut.

- 1938 - Jack Burgmann, Richmond
- 1942 – Eddie Ford, Richmond
- 1945 – Stan Le Lievre, St Kilda
- 1951 - Joe Hickey - Fitzroy
- 1951 - Tom Magee - Fitzroy
- 1968 – Les Bartlett, Footscray
- 1972 – Lloyd Burgmann, Melbourne
- 1985 – Rod Grinter, Melbourne
- 2001 – David Teague (footballer), North Melbourne & Carlton
- 2020 - Lachie Ash, Greater Western Sydney

The following footballers played senior VFL / AFL football prior to playing and / or coaching with Katandra with the year indicating their first season at Katandra.

- 1990 - Ian Sartori - St Kilda & Richmond
- 2008 – Derek Hall, West Coast and Geelong

== Club Honourboard ==
Senior Football

Year	President	Secretary	Treasurer	Captain/Coach	Best & Fairest	Top Goalkicker	Position
1911	Rupert Prideaux	R Tait		R Jeffrey			
Katandra Football Association
1912	Rupert Prideaux	R Tate	R Tate	R Jeffrey			2nd
1913							Premiers
1914							Premiers
1915							
1916-18							Club in recess. World War I
1919-21							Club in recess.
Dookie & District Football Association
1922	J A Goodwin	P Delaney					
1923							4th
1924	C Ford	P Delaney					
1925							
1926							Club in recess
1927							
Katandra & District Football Association
1928							
1929							Runner Up
1930							
1931							
1932							
1933							Club in recess
1934		J Miers					Club in recess
Chaney Cup
1935		A E Kyne &					
		A Chaney					
Goulburn Valley Second Eighteens Football Association
1936	W Montgomery	J Miers		George Grinter	J Creighton		6th
Goulburn Valley Football Association
1937	J Miers	P N Hickey	A Chaney	George Grinter &	Stan Le Lievre		3rd
				J Mansell			
1938	W Frankland	P N Hickey		George Grinter	Stan Le Lievre		3rd
1939	J Magee	P N Hickey		George Grinter	Stan Le Lievre		2nd
				Stan Le Lievre(Cap)			
1940	I W Miers	A G McIntosh		George Grinter			3rd
				Stan Le Lievre(Cap)			
1941	W Frankland	P N Hickey		George Grinter			3rd
				Stan Le Lievre(Cap)			
1942	W Frankland	P N Hickey		George Grinter			In recess > World War II
1943	W Frankland	P N Hickey		George Grinter			In recess > World War II
1944	W Downs	P N Hickey		George Grinter			In recess > World War II
1945	W Downs	P N Hickey		George Grinter			4th
Central Goulburn Valley Football League
1946	W Downs	W Hickey		Eddie Ford		Don Opie (31)	6th
1947	W Downs	W Hickey		J Burgman			6th
1948	W Frankland	K Baker &		K Baker			5th
		K Ellery					
1949	W Frankland	K Ellery		Pierce Purcell	S Rowan	D Matthews (24)	3rd
1950	L Connolly	B Black		Pierce Purcell	Don Opie	A Rowan (45)	Premiers*
1951	David Ford	S Rowan		Pierce Purcell	Max Mills	Max Mills*(29)	Premiers
				George Hudson(Cap)			
1952	K McDonnell	S Hooper		Pierce Purcell	Max Mills		Runner Up
Benalla Tungamah Football League
1953	J Cummins	G Hooper		A Hutchins	?		5th
1954	J Cummins	G Hooper		Harry Brittain	M Ford		3rd
1955	J Cummins	G Hooper		Harry Brittain	J McPhillamy		Premiers
1956	J Cummins	G Hooper		Harry Brittain	M Rowan		Premiers
1957	J Cummins	G Hooper		Harry Brittain	D Wallace		Premiers
1958	R Le Lievre	G Hooper		Harry Brittain	R Rowan		Premiers*
1959	K Baker	G Hooper		Harry Brittain	P West		4th
1960	K Baker	G Hooper		J Ernshaw	D Wallace		Runner Up
1961	K Baker	M Ibbottson		J Ernshaw	R Rowan		4th
1962	K Baker	H Burgman		L Cummins	M Grinter		7th
1963	K Baker	H Burgman		Ronnie Dell'oro	G Webb		4th
1964	K Baker	H Burgman		Lester Rootsey	P West		5th
1965	J Batey	H Burgman		L Chard	P West		5th
1966	J Batey	R Kelly		L Chard	Les Bartlett		Premiers
Tungamah Football League
1967	P West	R Kelly		D Fuller	L Chard		6th
1968	R Le Lievre	R Kelly		F Lente	P West		5th
1969	R Le Lievre	R Kelly		M Kick	G Wilkie		4th
1970	J Batey	R Kelly		Brian Campbell	Ron Le Lievre		Runner Up
1971	J Batey	R Kelly		Brian Campbell	K Teague		Runner Up
1972	Richie Mann	C Bartlett		Brian Campbell	K Teague		Runner Up
1973	Richie Mann	B McCullock		Brian Campbell	D Dudegon		Premiers
1974	W J Black	B McCullock		G Pell	R Lawless		Premiers
1975	W J Black	R Le Lievre		G Pell	L Burgman		Premiers
1976	W J Black	R Le Lievre		G Pell	R Sidebottom		5th
1977	W J Black	R Le Lievre &		L Burgman	D Wilkie		Premiers
		M Ryan					
1978	W J Black	G Goonan		L Burgman	G Teague		Runner Up
1979	R King	G Goonan		L Burgman	C Senior		Runner Up
1980	R King	G Goonan		R Le Lievre	R Sidebottom		Runner Up
1981	K Quigley						
1982	K Quigley						
1983	K Quigley						
1984	H Wells						
1985	H Wells						
1986	N Collins						
1987	N Collins						
1988	F Irvine						
1989	F Irvine						
1990	M Hannaford						
1991	M Hannaford						
1992	M Hannaford						
1993	R Lawless						
1994	R Lawless						
1995	R Lawless						
Picola & District Football League
1996	R Lawless			George Trianidis			7th
1997	R Lawless			Greg Reynoldson			7th
1998	R Lawless			Greg Reynoldson			Premiers
1999	R Lawless			Greg Reynoldson			7th
2000	R Lawless			Wes Teague			4th
2001	G Carroll			Travis Wayman			8th
2002	G Carroll			Glen Irvine			
2003	T O'Reilly			Mark Nolen &			Premiers
				Chris Pohlner			
2004	T O'Reilly			Aaron Plant			Premiers
2005	T O'Reilly			Mark Lambourn			3rd
2006	T O'Reilly			Mark Lambourn			Runner Up
2007	T O'Reilly			Mark Lambourn			Runner Up
2008	G Riordan			Derek Hall			Runner Up
Picola & District Football League South East Division
2009	G Riordan			Derek Hall		Derek Hall (83)	3rd
2010	G Riordan			Derek Hall		Derek Hall (53)	3rd
2011	G Riordan			Daniel O'Reilly		Cameron Calder (37)	6th
2012	C Senior			Daniel O'Reilly		Cameron Calder (15)	8th (last)
2013	C Senior			P Ralph		Luke Dunham (5)	8th (last)
2014	C Senior	L Pullen	R Dunham	P Ralph	Luke Minogue	Corey Hickford (16)	5th
2015	C Senior	L Lawn	R Dunham	L Minogue &	Luke Minogue	Corey Hickford (35)	6th
				S Ahmet			
2016	C Senior	L Lawn	R Dunham	S Ahmet &	Jonty Wardle	Corey Hickford (43)	5th
				R Yze			
2017	C Wilson	L Lawn	R Dunham	S Ahmet &	P Frappell	Corey Hickford (29)	8th (last)
				R Yze			
Murray Football League
2018	C Wilson	L Lawn	R Dunham	R Yze	Will Jeffrey	Corey Hickford (34)	14th
2019	C Wilson	L Lawn	R Dunham	R Yze	L Minogue	Ryleigh Shannon (24)	13th
Picola & District Football League
2020	C Wilson	L Lawn	R Dunham	Trent Herbert			In recess > COVID-19
2021	C Wilson	L Lawn	R Dunham	Trent Herbert	J Caia	Mitch Black (31)	9th
2022						Mitch Black (41) &	5th
						Luke Smith (41)	
2023						Luke Smith (59)	5th
2024						Tom Jeffrey (37)	Runner Up
2025				Bailey Bell &			
				Jason Whittaker			
Year	President	Secretary	Treasurer	Captain/Coach	Best & Fairest	Top Goalkicker	Position

- - 1950 & 1958: Undefeated Premiers

== Netball ==
As of 2025 the club fields the following netball sides in the Picola & DFNL competitions - A, B, C, C Reserve, Under 17's, 15's and 13's.

Premierships

- Picola & District Football League
  - A. Grade
    - 2009, 2013, 2014,
- B. Grade
  - 2000, 2008, 2011, 2012, 2013, 2016
- C. Grade
  - 2002, 2009, 2013,
- C. Reserve
  - 1998, 2001, 2016, 2024,

Under 17's

  - 2003
- Under 13's
  - 2001, 2013, 2014, 2015, 2022,
