= Stan Le Lievre =

Australian rules footballer (1920–2003)

Personal information
- Born: 31 July 1920
- Died: 18 March 2003 (aged 82)
- Original team: Katandra
- Height: 183 cm (6 ft 0 in)
- Weight: 86 kg (190 lb)

Playing career^{1}
Years	Club	Games (Goals)
1945–1947	St Kilda	20 (6)
- ^{1} Playing statistics correct to the end of 1947.

Stan Le Lievre (31 July 1920 – 18 March 2003) was an Australian rules footballer who played with St Kilda in the Victorian Football League (VFL).

== Career ==
Le Lievre came from Katandra and had a stint with the St Kilda seconds in 1940, before joining the senior list in 1945. He made 12 appearances for St Kilda in the 1945 VFL season, as a centre half-forward.

Before the 1946 season began, St Kilda lost the services of full-back Ken Walker, who left to coach Burnie. This meant Le Lievre was tried at full-back, when he played his first game of the season in round eight. He lost his place in the team after two games, before he returned in round 17 and played in the final three rounds.

In the opening round of the 1947 VFL season, Le Lievre was reported for "hacking" (forcing an opponent off balance by taking out his feet). The VFL Tribunal found that Le Lievre had kicked Footscray player Tim Robb and handed down a 12-week suspension. During his time out of the side, Le Lievre finished third in a long distance kicking competition for league footballers, with a 65 and a half yard kick. He returned to league football in round 18, a 34-point loss to Geelong. The following weekend, in the final round of the season, Le Lievre was matched up against Melbourne full-forward Fred Fanning, who ended the game with a league record 18 goals. He later reflected, "Nobody wants to put their hand up to playing on him but it doesn't worry me". It would be Fanning's final appearance in the VFL and also the last league game for Le Lievre.

He transferred to Oakleigh in the Victorian Football Association in 1948. In 1950 he was the inaugural coach for the newly formed Oakleigh District Football Club and led the side to the 1953 premiership.

After finishing his playing career he served as an executive first with the Oakleigh District club before moving into the executive of the Caulfield Oakleigh District Football League in 1957. He performed similar duties with the South East Suburban Football League including a number of years as the league President. He received an award from the Victorian Football Union for his services to football in 1977 and then the National Football League Merit Award in 1985. Le Lievre was inducted posthumously into the Southern Football League Hall of Fame in 2015.
