= David Teague (footballer) =

Australian rules footballer and coach

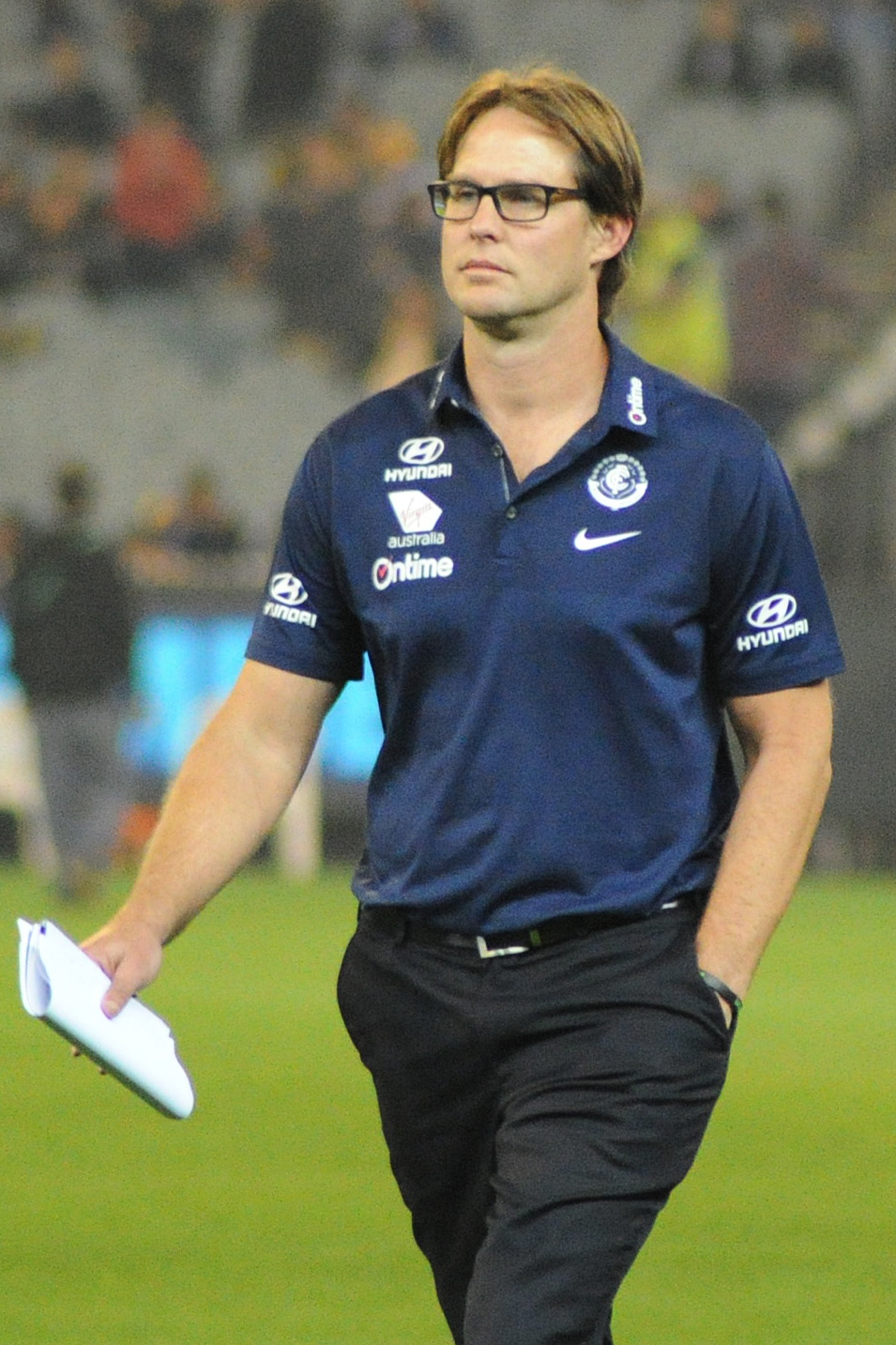
- Teague with Carlton in April 2018

Personal information
- Born: 5 May 1981 (age 45); Invergordon, Victoria
- Original teams: Katandra (PDFL); Murray Bushrangers (TAC Cup)
- Debut: Round 13, 30 June 2001, Kangaroos vs. Port Adelaide, at Manuka Oval
- Height: 186 cm (6 ft 1 in)
- Weight: 90 kg (198 lb)

Playing career^{1}
Years	Club	Games (Goals)
2001–2003	Kangaroos	33 (4)
2004–2006	Carlton	50 (2)
Total		83 (6)

Coaching career
Years	Club	Games (W–L–D)
2019-2021	Carlton	50 (21–29-0)
- ^{1} Playing statistics correct to the end of Round 23, 2021.

Career highlights
- John Nicholls Medal: 2004; Robert Rose Award: 2004

David Teague (born 5 May 1981) is a former professional Australian rules footballer who played for North Melbourne and Carlton in the Australian Football League and was the senior coach of the Carlton Football Club, from 2019 to 2021. He was an assistant coach with the Richmond Football Club from 2022 to 2024.

== Playing career ==
=== North Melbourne ===
Teague played in Corowa Rutherglen's 2000 Ovens & Murray Football League premiership team under coach, Peter Tossol, prior to the 2000 AFL draft, when Teague was recruited by the North Melbourne Football Club and made his AFL senior debut in 2001. He played a total of 33 senior games and kicked four goals throughout 3 seasons from 2001 until 2003 for the Kangaroos.

=== Carlton ===
Following the end of the 2003 AFL season, Teague was traded to the Carlton Football Club. Teague played a total of 50 games for Carlton Football Club and kicked two goals in his two seasons with the club from 2004 until 2006. In 2004, Teague won Carlton's best and fairest award, the John Nicholls Medal. He was delisted from Carlton's playing list in 2007 after failing to be in their lineup for the entire season.

Throughout his playing career, Teague was well-regarded for his courage in defence. In 2004, he won the Robert Rose Award as the most courageous player in the league, as voted by the players. His style made him a dominant player in wet conditions.

== Coaching career ==
=== Carlton assistant development coach and Northern Bullants player-coach (2007–2010) ===
On 12 October 2007, it was announced that Teague would continue with the Carlton Football Club as a development coach with Carlton and as player-coach for the Northern Bullants (on the Bullants list as a VFL-listed player). In 2009, Teague retired from playing with the Bullants, but he retained his coaching roles and was able to coach the Bullants into the club's first grand final since 1984. They finished runners-up to North Ballarat. In 2010, he again coached the Bullants into the grand final (which they again lost to North Ballarat).

=== West Coast Eagles assistant coach (2011–2013) ===
In 2011, Teague was appointed as an assistant coach for the West Coast Eagles. Teague was assistant coach for three seasons with the Eagles.

=== St Kilda Football Club assistant coach (2013–2014) ===
Teague joined St Kilda as an assistant coach in November 2013.

=== Adelaide Football Club assistant coach (2014–2017) ===
In October 2014, Teague was appointed assistant coach (forwards) with the Adelaide Crows under newly appointed senior coach Phil Walsh who he had previously worked with during his time at West Coast.

=== Carlton Football Club assistant coach (2017–2019) ===
In October 2017, Teague was appointed assistant coach (forwards) at Carlton, returning to the club after a long absence.

=== Carlton Football Club senior coach (2019–2021) ===
On 3 June 2019, Teague was announced as caretaker senior coach of Carlton Football Club, following the mid-season sacking of Brendon Bolton as senior coach of Carlton. Five days later, Teague coached and won his first match as coach of the club with a 15-point win over the Brisbane Lions. Teague led Carlton to win six games of the remaining eleven games of the 2019 season to finish sixteenth on the ladder. On 15 August 2019, following the club's improved results under his coaching, Teague was permanently installed and re-appointed as full-time Carlton Football Club senior coach, signing an initial three-year deal.

After Teague was given the role of full-time Carlton Football Club senior coach, things did not improve for the club, when Teague guided Carlton in the 2020 season to finish eleventh on the ladder with seven wins and ten losses. In the 2021 season, Carlton's on-field performance under Teague further deteriorated. The situation at the club then worsened with the disappointment of the expectations that dropped in the on-field performance. Teague's job came under increased pressure after the team's horror loss to Port Adelaide in a humiliating thrashing by 95 points In Round 22, 2021. After the final game of the 2021 season in Round 23, 2021, when Carlton under Teague lost to GWS by fourteen points, Teague told reporters in a press conference after the game:

“I understand the club will make a decision. Let's be honest, it doesn't look like it's going to go in my favour, but in terms of what I’ve done and what I’ve been able to control, I know who I am, I know the way I’ve done it and I'm really happy with it”. Teague also stated that he "didn't have the full support of people from within the club".

Carlton under Teague finished the 2021 season in thirteenth place on the ladder with eight wins and fourteen losses.

On 26 August 2021, Teague was sacked as Carlton Football Club senior coach at the end of the 2021 season. The club came to this decision after an extensive review of the club's football operations due to a disappointing season with poor on-field results. The club review found that Teague's coaching methods and gameplan were supported by only 30 percent of the club's players and the club's staff. Teague coached Carlton to a total of 50 games with 21 wins and 29 losses with a winning percentage of 44 percent. Teague was replaced by Michael Voss as Carlton Football Club senior coach.

=== Richmond Football Club assistant coach (2022–2024) ===
Shortly after Teague was sacked as Carlton senior coach, he made the move over to Punt Road to join the Richmond Football Club as an assistant coach under senior coach Damien Hardwick. then later under senior coaches Andrew McQualter and Adem Yze. On July 28, 2024, Teague left the Richmond Football Club in the middle of the 2024 season.

=== Later career ===
In 2025, Teague was appointed head of football at Melbourne Grammar.

== Statistics ==
=== Playing statistics ===
Legend
G	Goals	K	Kicks	D	Disposals	T	Tackles
B	Behinds	H	Handballs	M	Marks

Season	Team	No.	Games	Totals							Averages (per game)						
Season	Team	No.	Games	G	B	K	H	D	M	T	G	B	K	H	D	M	T
2001	Kangaroos	40	10	1	0	29	16	45	15	12	0.1	0.0	2.9	1.6	4.5	1.5	1.2
2002	Kangaroos	40	16	3	0	104	51	155	55	37	0.2	0.0	6.5	3.2	9.7	3.4	2.3
2003	Kangaroos	40	7	0	0	31	31	62	14	11	0.0	0.0	4.4	4.4	8.9	2.0	1.6
2004	Carlton	15	22	1	1	168	93	261	78	55	0.0	0.0	7.6	4.2	11.9	3.5	2.5
2005	Carlton	15	21	1	2	141	66	207	70	66	0.0	0.1	6.7	3.1	9.9	3.3	3.1
2006	Carlton	15	7	0	1	41	27	68	26	20	0.0	0.1	5.9	3.9	9.7	3.7	2.9
Career			83	6	4	514	284	798	258	201	0.1	0.0	6.2	3.4	9.6	3.1	2.4

== Head coaching record ==
Team	Year	Home and Away Season					Finals			
Team	Year	Won	Lost	Drew	%	Position	Won	Lost	Win %	Result
CARL	2019	6	5	0	.545	16th out of 18	-	-	-	-
CARL	2020	7	10	0	.412	11th out of 18	-	-	-	-
CARL	2021	8	14	0	.364	13th out of 18	-	-	-	-
Total		21	29	0	.420		-	-	–	
