= Les Witto =

Australian rules footballer

Personal information
- Full name: Leslie Witto
- Born: 6 May 1903; Broken Hill, New South Wales
- Died: 23 August 1926 (aged 23); Melbourne, Victoria
- Original team: Broken Hill West
- Height: 177 cm (5 ft 10 in)
- Weight: 74 kg (163 lb)

Playing career^{1}
Years	Club	Games (Goals)
1926	Carlton	6 (0)
- ^{1} Playing statistics correct to the end of 1926.

Les Witto (6 May 1903 – 23 August 1926) was an Australian rules footballer who played with Carlton in the Victorian Football League (VFL).

== History ==
A defender, Witto was playing in just his sixth game of league football when he broke his arm in a game against Geelong and died nine days later from a tetanus infection.
