= Epping Football Club =

Names
- Full name: Epping Football Club
- Nickname: "The Pingers"

Club details
- Founded: 1895; 131 years ago
- Colours: Navy and White
- Competition: Northern Football League
- President: Luke De Vincentis
- Coach: Nathan Storer
- Captain: Leigh Judd
- Ground: Epping Recreation Reserve

Other information
- Official website: www.eppingfc.com.au

Epping Football Club is an Australian rules football club located in the suburb of Epping in the outer northern suburbs of Melbourne. It plays in the Northern Football Netball League (formerly the Diamond Valley Football League).

== History ==
The Epping Football Club was formed in 1895. The club began playing social matches up until joining the Whittlesea and District Football Association in 1904.

In 1906 the Bourke-Evelyn Football Association was formed with Epping as one of the foundation teams. The club remained in the Bourke-Evelyn Football Association until the league folded in 1932, winning 10 Premierships along the way.

In 1933, Epping Football Club joined the Diamond Valley Football League and won the premiership in their first season. Epping won another five premierships up until 1981 when the league was split into two divisions. Epping has since won a further two premierships in Division Two. The club competed in Division One from 1991 until the end of the 2007 season before the Blues were relegated to Division Two.

After winning the Division Two Premiership in 2012, following a season in which they lost only once, the EFC made their way back up into Division One for the 2013 season.

Although winning 4 games in the return to Division One, the Epping FC were relegated to Division 2 for the 2014 season. Since 2014 Division 2 season the club has been starved of success and are building again from Division 3 in 2025.

Epping Football Club boasts a strong junior affiliate club – fielding junior teams from the under 9s through to the under 15s, Auskick and Youth Girls teams.

On 4 July 2026, Epping player Nathan Fitzgerald suffered head injuries during an NFNL reserves match against Lalor. He died in hospital two days later.

== AFL representatives ==
Epping Football Club has been the home club of several footballers who have played in the VFL/AFL, including:

- Reg Milburn - Fitzroy Football Club
- Trevor Johnson - Melbourne Football Club
- Frank Vearing - Melbourne Football Club
- Brent Heaver – Melbourne, Carlton, and Port Adelaide
- Darren Cuthbertson – Melbourne
- Ricky Dyson – Essendon
- Kalev Vann – Fitzroy
- Jack Petruccelle - West Coast
- Zak Johnson - Essendon
