= Mitch Grigg =

Australian rules footballer

Personal information
- Full name: Mitchell Grigg
- Nickname: The Griggmeister General Grigganator Schnitzel grigg
- Born: 2 January 1993 (age 33)
- Original teams: Athelstone (SAAFL); Norwood (SANFL)
- Draft: No. 41, 2011 national draft
- Debut: Round 17, 2013, Adelaide vs. Geelong, at AAMI Stadium
- Height: 183 cm (6 ft 0 in)
- Weight: 99 kg (15 st 8 lb; 218 lb)
- Position: Midfielder

Playing career^{1}
Years	Club	Games (Goals)
2013–2016	Adelaide	20 (15)
- ^{1} Playing statistics correct to the end of 2016.

Career highlights
- 2017 & 2018 Magarey Medal (SANFL); 2018 Jack Oatey Medal (SANFL)

Mitch Grigg (born 2 January 1993) is a former professional Australian rules footballer who played for the Adelaide Football Club in the Australian Football League (AFL). He was recruited from Norwood Football Club in the South Australian National Football League (SANFL) with selection 41 in the 2011 national draft. He won the Magarey Medal in 2017 and 2018 playing for the Norwood Football Club.

== AFL career ==
Grigg did not play an AFL game in 2012, instead playing for the Norwood senior and reserves sides in the SANFL. He made his debut late the next season, in round 17 against Geelong, after showing strong form in the SANFL. In five games in 2013, he averaged an impressive 16 possessions, returning to Norwood for the finals where he helped them to a premiership. He also re-signed with the club for two years.

Grigg struggled to break into the side in 2014 and 2015, hampered by the substitute rule and untimely injuries, but he performed well in the SANFL for Adelaide's new reserves side, polling the most Magarey Medal votes for the club in both seasons. At the conclusion of the 2016 season, he was delisted by Adelaide without an AFL game being played for the 2016 AFL Season. After he was delisted by the Crows, he returned to the Norwood in the SANFL, the club he played for prior to being drafted by the Adelaide Football Club.

== SANFL career ==
Since returning to Norwood in 2017, Grigg has won back-to-back Magarey Medals and was awarded the Jack Oatey Medal after the 2018 SANFL Grand Final, the first player in SANFL history to be awarded the medal whilst playing for the losing side.

== Statistics ==
Legend
G	Goals	K	Kicks	D	Disposals	T	Tackles
B	Behinds	H	Handballs	M	Marks

Season	Team	No.	Games	Totals							Averages (per game)						
Season	Team	No.	Games	G	B	K	H	D	M	T	G	B	K	H	D	M	T
2013	Adelaide	38	5	6	2	53	28	81	12	17	1.2	0.4	10.6	5.6	16.2	2.4	3.4
2014	Adelaide	38	9	6	6	67	38	105	25	15	0.7	0.7	7.4	4.2	11.7	2.8	1.7
2015	Adelaide	8	6	3	4	69	34	103	30	20	0.5	0.7	11.5	5.7	17.2	5.0	3.0
2016	Adelaide	8	0	—	—	—	—	—	—	—	—	—	—	—	—	—	—
Career			20	15	12	189	100	289	67	52	0.8	0.6	9.5	5.0	14.5	3.4	2.6
