= 2018 Adelaide Football Club season =

28th season in the AFL

The 2018 Adelaide Football Club season was the Adelaide Football Club's 28th season in the AFL. It was also its second season in the AFL Women's and its 5th season fielding a reserves team in the SANFL. The men's team started the season successfully, winning the inaugural Adelaide AFLX competition.

== AFL ==
Adelaide Football Club
2018 season
- President: Andrew Fagan
- Coach: Don Pyke (3rd season)
- Captains: Taylor Walker (4th season)
- Home ground: Adelaide Oval (Capacity: 53,583)

=== List changes ===
After only making one appearance at AFL level in the 2017 season, two-time club champion Scott Thompson decided to retire. Before trade period began, the Crows announced that they would not be renewing the contracts of Troy Menzel and Dean Gore. They also officially announced that Sam Shaw had been removed from the rookie list after being kept on it during the 2017 season for administrative reasons.

Days after Adelaide's grand final loss, Jake Lever requested a trade to Melbourne. Adelaide were able to secure two first round draft picks (one in the 2017 draft and one in the 2018 draft) for the key defender. The Crows then used the 2017 first round pick, along with their own, to bring Bryce Gibbs to the club from Carlton. Charlie Cameron requested a trade to Brisbane Lions, but it wasn't until the final hour of the trade period that he was traded in exchange for pick 12 in the 2017 draft. During the trade period Adelaide also traded Harrison Wigg for Pick 39 and brought North Melbourne veteran Sam Gibson into the side in exchange for Pick 91.

Before the 2017 national draft, the Crows also delisted Cam Ellis-Yolmen and Jono Beech. Beech was told that he would not be offered another contract, but the club committed to re-drafting Ellis-Yolmen in the 2018 rookie draft. The team also nominated Jackson Edwards, the son of dual premiership player Tyson Edwards, for a father–son selection. Edwards was not picked up during the national draft by any team, and as a result he automatically joined the Crows list with their final selection in the rookie draft.

Adelaide only used two draft picks in the national draft. With their first round pick the Crows selected South Australian forward/midfielder Darcy Fogarty. At the start of 2017 Fogarty had been considered a contender for the number one draft pick, but his 2017 season was ended in July when he suffered an injury requiring knee surgery and he slipped down the draft to pick 12, enabling the Crows to select him. The Crows' second pick was in round three, the pick they had received for trading Wigg to Gold Coast, and they used it to draft Andrew McPherson, who they hadn't expected to still be available. In addition to re-drafting Cam Ellis-Yolmen and automatically acquiring Jackson Edwards in the rookie draft, the Crows selected Patrick Wilson, mature-aged SANFL premiership player with Sturt, and Lachlan Murphy, a member of the club's development squad who had been playing in the SANFL reserves team in 2017.

==== Retirements and delistings ====
| **Player** | **Date** | **Reason** | **Career games** | **Career goals** | **Ref.** |
| Scott Thompson | 25 July 2017 | Retired (Note: Retirement effective at the end of the season) | 308 | 162 | |
| Troy Menzel | 7 October 2017 | Delisted | 44 | 51 | |
| Dean Gore | 7 October 2017 | Delisted | 0 | 0 | |
| Cam Ellis-Yolmen (Note: Cam Ellis-Yolmen was delisted and redrafted as a rookie after missing the entire 2017 season due to injury) | 30 October 2017 | Delisted | 14 | 7 | |
| Jono Beech | 30 October 2017 | Delisted | 3 | 1 | |

==== Trades ====
| **Date** | **Gained** | **From** | **Lost** | **Ref.** |
| 12 October 2017 | Pick 10; 2018 first round pick (Melbourne); 2018 fourth round pick (Melbourne) | Melbourne | Jake Lever; Pick 35; 2018 third round pick (Adelaide) | |
| 18 October 2017 | Pick 39 | Gold Coast | Harrison Wigg; Pick 54; 2018 fourth round pick (Adelaide) | |
| 19 October 2017 | Bryce Gibbs; Pick 77; 2018 second round pick (Carlton); 2018 third round pick (Carlton) | Carlton | Pick 10; Pick 16; Pick 73; 2018 second round pick (Adelaide) | |
| 19 October 2017 | Sam Gibson | North Melbourne | Pick 91 | |
| 19 October 2017 | Pick 12 | Brisbane Lions | Charlie Cameron | |

==== National draft ====
| **Round** | **Pick** | **Player** | **Recruited from** | **League** | **Ref.** |
| 1 | 12 | Darcy Fogarty | Glenelg | SANFL | |
| 3 | 40 | Andrew McPherson | Woodville-West Torrens | SANFL | |

==== Rookie draft ====
| **Round** | **Pick** | **Player** | **Recruited from** | **League** | **Ref.** |
| 1 | 17 | Patrick Wilson | Sturt | SANFL | |
| 2 | 31 | Cam Ellis-Yolmen (Note: Cam Ellis-Yolmen was delisted and redrafted as a rookie after missing the entire 2017 season due to injury) | Adelaide | AFL | |
| 3 | 38 | Lachlan Murphy | Adelaide | SANFL | |
| 4 | 41 | Jackson Edwards (Note: Jackson Edwards was a father–son selection (son of Tyson Edwards)) | Glenelg | SANFL | |

=== Squad ===
Adelaide Football Club
| Senior list | | Rookie list | Coaching staff |
|---|---|---|---|
| 1 Hugh Greenwood; 2 Brad Crouch; 3 Riley Knight; 4 Josh Jenkins; 5 Matt Crouch; 6 Bryce Gibbs; 7 Jordan Gallucci; 8 Jake Kelly; 9 Rory Sloane (vc); 10 Myles Poholke; 11 Paul Seedsman; 12 Daniel Talia; 13 Taylor Walker (c); 14 David Mackay; 15 Kyle Hartigan; 16 Luke Brown; 18 Eddie Betts | 21 Rory Atkins; 22 Andy Otten; 24 Sam Jacobs; 25 Kyle Cheney; 26 Richard Douglas; 27 Tom Lynch; 29 Rory Laird; 30 Wayne Milera; 32 Darcy Fogarty; 33 Brodie Smith; 34 Elliott Himmelberg; 35 Matthew Signorello; 36 Andrew McPherson; 39 Tom Doedee; 40 Ben Davis; 42 Alex Keath; 43 Reilly O'Brien | 28 Cam Ellis-Yolmen; 31 Patrick Wilson; 37 Paul Hunter; 44 Lachlan Murphy | **Head coach**: Don Pyke; **Assistant coaches**: Michael Godden (midfield); Matthew Clarke (ruck/AFLW Coach); Martin Mattner (defensive); Ben Hart (forwards); Scott Camporeale (Senior Assistant / Game Strategy); Health Younie (SANFL senior coach and development manager); Matthew Wright (SANFL Captain/forwards development coach); Paul Thomas (midfield development coach); Brent Reilly (defence development coach); Legend: (c) Captain(s); (vc) Vice-captain(s); (B) Category B rookie; Updated: 29th of September 2018; Source(s): Senior list, Rookie list, Coaches |

=== Season summary ===
==== AFLX ====
Adelaide participated in Group A of the inaugural AFLX competition. All matches were played at Cooper Stadium in Adelaide on Thursday, 15 February. After defeating Collingwood and West Coast to finish at the top of their pool, the Crows defeated Geelong by 8 points in the final and became the first ever AFLX premiers. Though Adelaide mainly played depth players rather than a top-level squad, experienced trio Cam Ellis-Yolmen, Curtly Hampton and Kyle Cheney, all of whom had missed much of 2017 due to injury, had opportunities to perform well.

==== Pre-season ====
The Crows had to rest several key players for JLT Community Series matches due to injury recovery, such as captain Taylor Walker, key defender Daniel Talia and midfielders Rory Sloane and Hugh Greenwood. During the series new recruits at the club put their name forward to play for the team in the opening round of the regular season, including Lachlan Murphy, a rookie-listed small forward, and Bryce Gibbs, an off-season recruit from Carlton.

| **Game** | **Date and local time** | **Opponent** | **Scores** (Adelaide's scores indicated in **bold**) | | | **Venue** | **Attendance** | **Report** |
| **Game** | **Date and local time** | **Opponent** | Home | Away | Result | **Venue** | **Attendance** | **Report** |
| 1 | Sunday, 25 February (1:35 pm) | Fremantle | **13.13 (91)** | 12.9 (81) | Won by 10 points | Strathalbyn Oval, Strathalbyn (H) | 6,398 | |
| 2 | Saturday, 10 March (4:35 pm) | Port Adelaide | 16.12 (98) | **11.6 (72)** | Lost by 26 points | Alberton Oval (A) | 6,157 | |

===== Game 1 =====
The Crows went into the JLT Community Series knowing that they would be without several players due to injury, notably including captain Taylor Walker, who was set to return from a foot injury in time for the first match of the regular season. In addition, midfielders Brad Crouch and Hugh Greenwood were left out of the team for the first game due to better manage their recoveries from injury. However, the first match was also the first opportunity for off-season recruit Bryce Gibbs to play a full match with the Crows. In the absence of both Taylor Walker and Rory Sloane, Tom Lynch was named the captain for Adelaide's match against Fremantle. During training for the match, defender Daniel Talia rolled his ankle and was withdrawn from the team, replaced with draftee Darcy Fogarty.

The Crows got out to a 29-point lead at half-time, but Fremantle fought back to get a lead of 9 points deep into the last quarter. The Crows scored the final three goals of the game to win by 10 points. Among the Crows' best players were Gibbs (with 27 possessions and a goal) and Matt Crouch (with 36 disposals), who was dominant in the stoppages. Acting captain Lynch was also impressive as a link-up forward.

Game 1
Sunday, 25 February 1:35 pm | **Adelaide** | def. | Fremantle | Strathalbyon Oval, Strathalbyn (crowd: 6,398) | Report
2.3 (15); 7.7 (49); 9.9 (63); 13.13 (91) | **Q1; Q2; Q3; Final** | 3.1 (19); 3.2 (20); 8.5 (53); 12.9 (81) | Umpires: H. Gavine, N. Williamson, C. Fleer, A. Gianagna
Murphy 3, Atkins 2, McGovern 2, Lynch 2, Dear, Gibbs, Fogarty, Ellis-Yolmen | **Goals** | Taberner 3, Banfield 2, Fyfe 2, Neale, Langdon, Ballantyne, McCarthy, Walters
Gibbs, M. Crouch, Lynch, Laird, Doedee, Hampton | **Best** | Fyfe, Neale, Taberner, Mundy, A. Pearce, Walters
Daniel Talia (ankle) | **Injuries** | Cameron Sutcliffe (head knock)
Nil | **Reports** | Nil

===== Game 2 =====
Talia returned from injury and joined the team for the first time of the year, along with Sloane, Greenwood, Eddie Betts, Richard Douglas and Kyle Hartigan, with the Crows fielding 25 players in the pre-season derby against crosstown rivals Port Adelaide. Again the Crows had a commanding lead at half-time but allowed their opposition to get back into the game. This time they had a 26-point lead which Port Adelaide overcame, and they lost the game by 26 points themselves, only scoring three goals in the second half of the game. Despite the loss, there were impressive performances from new players Fogarty and Sam Gibson, a recruit from North Melbourne, both of whom put themselves into contention for a debut for the Crows in round 1 of the regular season. Small forward Lachlan Murphy also performed well for the second match in a row to put his name forwards.

Game 2
Saturday, 10 March 4:35 pm | **Port Adelaide** | def. | Adelaide | Alberton Oval (crowd: 6,157) | Report
3.1 (19); 4.2 (26); 10.2 (62); 16.2 (98) | **Q1; Q2; Q3; Final** | 4.2 (26); 8.4 (52); 9.5 (59); 11.6 (72) | Umpires: Chamberlain, Stevic, Fisher
Watts 6, Wingard 2, S. Gray 2, R. Gray 2, Westhoff, Dixon, Ryder, Howard | **Goals** | Fogarty 3, Gibbs 2, Atkins 2, McGovern, Lynch, Sloane, Gibson
Watts, Byrne-Jones, Howard, Westhoff, Motlop, R. Gray | **Best** | Gibson, M. Crouch, Fogarty, Gibbs, Atkins, Sloane
Jasper Pittard (hamstring) | **Injuries** | Nil
Nil | **Reports** | Nil

==== Home and Away season ====
The fixture for the 2018 home and away season was announced on 31 October 2017. Adelaide will host Richmond in a re-match of the 2017 AFL Grand Final in round 2 on a Thursday night at the Adelaide Oval. Bryce Gibbs will play against former side Carlton for the first time in round 7, then the Crows will face off against ex-Crow Jake Lever for the first time when they play Melbourne in round 10.

| **Rd** | **Date and local time** | **Opponent** | **Scores** (Adelaide's scores indicated in **bold**) | | | **Venue** | **Attendance** | **Report** |
| **Rd** | **Date and local time** | **Opponent** | Home | Away | Result | **Venue** | **Attendance** | **Report** |
| 1 | Friday, 23 March (7:50 pm) | Essendon | 14.15 (99) | **12.15 (87)** | Lost by 12 points | Etihad Stadium (A) | 38,324 | |
| 2 | Thursday, 29 March (7:20 pm) | Richmond | **18.10 (118)** | 12.10 (82) | Won by 36 points | Adelaide Oval (H) | 49,743 | |
| 3 | Saturday, 7 April (7:25 pm) | St Kilda | 7.13 (55) | **15.14 (104)** | Won by 49 points | Etihad Stadium (A) | 19,324 | |
| 4 | Friday, 13 April (7:20 pm) | Collingwood | **9.4 (58)** | 16.10 (106) | Lost by 48 points | Adelaide Oval (H) | 45,495 | |
| 5 | Friday, 20 April (7:50 pm) | Sydney | 10.15 (75) | **12.13 (85)** | Won by 10 points | SCG (A) | 38,017 | |
| 6 | Saturday, 28 April (7:10 pm) | Gold Coast | **16.14 (110)** | 9.8 (62) | Won by 48 points | Adelaide Oval (H) | 44,835 | |
| 7 | Saturday, 5 May (7:10 pm) | Carlton | **19.11 (125)** | 10.10 (70) | Won by 55 points | Adelaide Oval (H) | 47,422 | |
| 8 | Saturday, 12 May (4:40 pm) | Port Adelaide | 14.11 (95) | **14.6 (90)** | Lost by 5 points | Adelaide Oval (A) | 50,967 | |
| 9 | Friday, 18 May (7:20 pm) | Western Bulldogs | **9.9 (63)** | 2.14 (26) | Won by 37 points | Adelaide Oval (H) | 39,407 | |
| 10 | Sunday, 27 May (2:50 pm) | Melbourne | 23.8 (146) | **8.7 (55)** | Lost by 91 points | TIO Traeger Park (A) | 6,989 | |
| 11 | Sunday, 3 June (4:10 pm) | Greater Western Sydney | **11.15 (81)** | 14.13 (97) | Lost by 16 points | Adelaide Oval (H) | 44,120 | |
| 12 | Sunday, 10 June (2:40 pm) | Fremantle | 10.11 (71) | **9.14 (68)** | Lost by 3 points | Perth Stadium (A) | 33,421 | |
| 13 | Saturday, 16 June (7:25 pm) | Hawthorn | 12.16 (88) | **4.8 (32)** | Lost by 56 points | MCG (A) | 26,693 | |
| 14 | Bye | | | | | | | |
| 15 | Saturday, 30 June (4:05 pm) | West Coast | **12.16 (88)** | 12.6 (78) | Won by 10 points | Adelaide Oval (H) | 44,771 | |
| 16 | Friday, 6 July (7:50 pm) | Richmond | 15.13 (103) | **8.8 (56)** | Lost by 47 points | MCG (A) | 54,934 | |
| 17 | Thursday, 12 July (7:20 pm) | Geelong | **16.16 (112)** | 14.13 (97) | Won by 15 points | Adelaide Oval (H) | 46,095 | |
| 18 | Saturday, 21 July (7:25 pm) | Brisbane Lions | 13.10 (88) | **13.15 (93)** | Won by 5 points | The Gabba (A) | 20,475 | |
| 19 | Saturday, 28 July (7:10 pm) | Melbourne | **10.17 (77)** | 13.12 (90) | Lost by 13 points | Adelaide Oval (H) | 45,880 | |
| 20 | Saturday, 4 August (4:05 pm) | Port Adelaide | **13.18 (96)** | 14.9 (93) | Won by 3 points | Adelaide Oval (H) | 50,377 | |
| 21 | Saturday, 11 August (7:25 pm) | Greater Western Sydney | 15.16 (106) | **13.14 (92)** | Lost by 14 points | UNSW Canberra Oval (A) | 13,249 | |
| 22 | Sunday, 19 August (4:10 pm) | North Melbourne | **12.14 (86)** | 11.11 (77) | Won by 9 points | Adelaide Oval (H) | 41,444 | |
| 23 | Saturday, 25 August (7:25 pm) | Carlton | 8.13 (61) | **26.9 (165)** | Won by 104 points | Etihad Stadium (A) | 17,000 | |

===== Round 1 =====
Due to injuries from the pre-season, there was uncertainty about whether or not Taylor Walker, due to a foot injury, and Brad Crouch, due to abdominal strain, would be playing. According to Daniel Talia, the Crows were taking a cautious approach, unwilling to risk using players who had not had a full pre-season, and as a result neither played in round 1. Instead of Walker, the Crows played debutant Darcy Fogarty, who made his debut alongside Tom Doedee (who was in the side to replace Jake Lever, who had left the club to play for Melbourne) and Lachlan Murphy.

Breaking with their normal routine for matches in Melbourne, the Crows elected to fly to Melbourne a day early to have a closed training session in an undisclosed location. On the day of the match, Sam Gibson, listed to play his first match for the Crows since moving from North Melbourne the previous season, was withdrawn from the squad due to hamstring tightness. Having played 130 consecutive games for North Melbourne before being delisted, this put an end to the longest-running streak of consecutive matches played in the AFL at the time.

During the first quarter of the match, Richard Douglas was reported by the field umpires for rough conduct on Essendon player Zach Merrett during a collision which resulted in a concussion for Merrett, ruling Merrett out of the rest of the match. The match was tight and low-scoring during the first half, with Essendon going into half-time with a 5-point lead. The Crows then opened up more opportunities for scoring in the third quarter and outscored Essendon by seven goals to three to take a 20-point lead themselves. Some of the Crows best players on the ground were Rory Laird and Matt Crouch, both of whom achieved 40 disposals throughout the match, and Bryce Gibbs, playing his first match for Adelaide since moving from Carlton. Gibbs had 35 disposals, including seven clearances and two goals in the third quarter.

Despite their dominant position going into the final quarter, the Crows were only able to score one more goal for the match and lost by 12 points. Making the result worse for them was a groin injury to Curtly Hampton, who had already spent most of the previous season out of the side due to injury. This was their first loss to Essendon since 2014.

Round 1
Friday, 23 March 7:50 pm | **Essendon** | def. | Adelaide | Etihad Stadium (crowd: 43,016) | Report
4.2 (26); 5.8 (38); 8.10 (58); 14.15 (99) | **Q1; Q2; Q3; Final** | 3.5 (23); 4.9 (33); 11.12 (78); 12.15 (87) | Umpires: O'Gorman, Chamberlain, Pannell
Hooker 3, Stewart 3, Daniher 2, Green 2, McGrath, Bellchambers, Goddard, Begley | **Goals** | Jenkins 2, Gibbs 2, Fogarty 2, Hampton, McGovern, Murphy, Douglas, Greenwood, Ellis-Yolmen
Heppell, Zaharakis, Hurley, Goddard, D. Smith, McDonald-Tipungwuti, McGrath | **Best** | Laird, Gibbs, M. Crouch, Sloane, Doedee, Seedsman
Merrett (concussion) | **Injuries** | Hampton (groin), Gibson (hamstring tightness) replaced in selected side by Greenwood
Nil | **Reports** | Richard Douglas for rough conduct on Zach Merrett

===== Round 2 =====
During the week after Adelaide's loss to Essendon, the Crows' controversial pre-season training camp was leaked to the press, with reports emerging that players had been distressed at the camp. Journalist Sam McClure claimed that Taylor Walker had "sent a fairly terse text message to teammates demanding to know who it was that leaked the information", and also claimed that one player at the club was re-considering their future with the team.

Walker returned to Adelaide's team for his first match of the season, against 2017 Grand Final opponents Richmond. In total there were seven changes from the team that had played in the grand final to the team named to play in the match. During the game the Crows suffered injuries to four different players, with Matt Crouch leaving the ground in the second quarter due to a hamstring injury and David Mackay leaving the ground to due concussion from a collision with Richmond player Josh Caddy. Rory Sloane and Daniel Talia also left the ground with injuries, but both returned to finish the game.

In the first half Josh Jenkins had an impressive performance against All-Australian defender Alex Rance, kicking four goals against him, followed by a fifth later in the game. Due to strong performances in the forward line from both Jenkins and Walker, the Crows led at the end of every quarter and finished off with a 36-point win.

Round 2
Thursday, 29 March 7:50 pm | **Adelaide** | def. | Richmond | Adelaide Oval (crowd: 49,743) | Report
4.4 (28); 11.4 (70); 14.7 (91); 18.10 (118) | **Q1; Q2; Q3; Final** | 4.2 (26); 9.4 (58); 10.9 (69); 12.10 (82) | Umpires: Nicholls, Fleer, Mollison
Jenkins 5, Walker 4, Sloane 2, Murphy 2, Fogarty 2, Gibbs, Ellis-Yolmen, Greenwood | **Goals** | Martin 5, Caddy 3, Edwards, Lambert, Bolton, Townsend
Laird, Jenkins, Gibbs, Sloane, Jacobs, Hartigan, Ellis-Yolmen | **Best** | Martin, Caddy, Cotchin, Nankervis, Edwards, Short
Crouch (hamstring), Mackay (concussion) | **Injuries** | Nil
Nil | **Reports** | Nil

===== Round 3 =====
St Kilda dominated most of the play in the first half of the match, but were unable to convert that to a scoreboard lead and the Crows still led by 10 points at half time. During the half time break, coach Don Pyke instructed the players to be more predictable in how they passed the ball to each other and as a result the Crows were able to control the game more and finish the match 49-point winners.

Round 3
Saturday, 7 April 7:25 pm | St Kilda | def. by | **Adelaide** | Etihad Stadium (crowd: 19,324) | Report
2.6 (18); 3.9 (27); 4.12 (36); 7.13 (55) | **Q1; Q2; Q3; Final** | 3.2 (20); 5.7 (37); 11.10 (76); 15.14 (104) | Umpires: Brown, Findlay, Ryan
Sinclair, Acres, Coffield, Bruce, Gresham, Geary, Armitage | **Goals** | Betts 3, Walker 3, Seedsman 2, McGovern 2, Rory Atkins 2, Douglas, Jenkins, Gibbs
Sinclair, Dunstan, Ross, Newnes, Steven | **Best** | Gibbs, Laird, Jacobs, Seedsman, Douglas, Betts
Nil | **Injuries** | Nil
Nil | **Reports** | Nil

===== Round 4 =====
The Crows were dominated by the Magpies in the first half to trail by 52 points during the third quarter. They kicked four goals in a row to bring themselves back into the contest, only trailing by 30 points early in the final quarter, but Collingwood then kicked five of the last seven goals to seal the match. Crows star forward Eddie Betts injured his left hamstring and was unable to finish the match.

Round 4
Friday, 13 April 7:20 pm | Adelaide | def. by | **Collingwood** | Adelaide Oval (crowd: 45,495) | Report
1.1 (7); 3.2 (20); 6.3 (39); 9.4 (58) | **Q1; Q2; Q3; Final** | 5.2 (32); 8.5 (53); 11.9 (75); 16.10 (106) | Umpires: Hay, Williamson, McInerney
McGovern 2, Walker 2, Gibbs 2, Ellis-Yolmen, Atkins, Seedsman | **Goals** | Stephenson 5, Thomas 2, Hoskin-Elliott 2, Grundy, Varcoe, Reid, Phillips, Crocker, Aish, De Goey
Laird, Seedsman, Gibbs, Atkins, Greenwood | **Best** | Sidebottom, Grundy, Stephenson, Treloar, Pendlebury, Phillips, Hoskin-Elliott, Dunn
Betts (hamstring), Mackay (head knock) | **Injuries** | Nil
Nil | **Reports** | Nil

===== Round 5 =====
Round 5
Friday, 20 April 7:50 pm | Sydney | def. by | **Adelaide** | Sydney Cricket Ground (crowd: 38,017) | Report
3.3 (21); 6.6 (42); 8.9 (57); 10.15 (75) | **Q1; Q2; Q3; Final** | 4.9 (33); 8.10 (58); 9.12 (66); 12.13 (85) | Umpires: Donlon, Hausen, Meredith
Rohan 2, Jones, Towers, Florent, Franklin, Heeney, Jack, Cunningham, Hewett | **Goals** | Walker 5, Atkins 3, Jenkins 3, Seedsman, Gallucci
Lloyd, Rampe, McVeigh, Jones | **Best** | Walker, Laird, Seedsman, Jenkins, Atkins, Talia
Nil | **Injuries** | Hartigan (hamstring)
Nil | **Reports** | Nil

===== Round 6 =====
Round 6
Saturday, 28 April 7:10 pm | **Adelaide** | def. | Gold Coast | Adelaide Oval (crowd: 44,835) | Report
4.4 (28); 10.7 (67); 13.9 (87); 16.14 (110) | **Q1; Q2; Q3; Final** | 2.1 (13); 3.4 (22); 7.6 (48); 9.8 (62) | Umpires: Gavine, Ryan, Gianfagna
Douglas 3, Lynch 3, Walker 2, Gallucci 2, Knight 2, Seedsman, Ellis-Yolmen, Crouch, McGovern | **Goals** | Swallow 3, Lonergan, Miller, Sexton, Ainsworth, Barlow, Martin
Milera, Laird, Gibbs, Crouch, Atkins, Talia, Lynch | **Best** | Swallow, Lyons, Miller, May, Barlow
Walker (hamstring), Mackay (hip/glute) | **Injuries** | Nil
Nil | **Reports** | Nil

===== Round 7 =====
Round 7
Saturday, 5 May 7:10 pm | **Adelaide** | def. | Carlton | Adelaide Oval (crowd: 47,422) | Report
7.2 (44); 9.3 (57); 15.8 (98); 19.11 (125) | **Q1; Q2; Q3; Final** | 2.1 (13); 6.4 (40); 7.8 (50); 10.10 (70) | Umpires: Stevic, Brown, Harris
McGovern 5, Jenkins 3, Douglas 2, Lynch 2, Betts 2, Greenwood 2, Laird, Gibbs, Mackay | **Goals** | Casboult 2, McKay 2, Kreuzer, Phillips, Dow, Graham, Wright, E. Curnow
McGovern, Laird, Douglas, Crouch, Gibbs, Greenwood, Ellis-Yolmen | **Best** | Thomas, E. Curnow, Cripps, Simpson, Kerridge
Milera (leg) | **Injuries** | Casboult (ribs), Plowman (quad)
Nil | **Reports** | Nil

===== Round 8 =====
Round 8
Saturday, 12 May 4:40 pm | **Port Adelaide** | def. | Adelaide | Adelaide Oval (crowd: 50,967) | Report
1.3 (9); 4.6 (30); 11.11 (77); 14.11 (95) | **Q1; Q2; Q3; Final** | 4.2 (26); 8.3 (51); 10.5 (65); 14.6 (90) | Umpires: Donlon, Haussen, Meredith
R. Gray 6, Wingard 2, Ryder 2, S. Gray, Boak, Powell-Pepper, Motlop | **Goals** | Betts 3, Ellis-Yolmen 2, McGovern 2, Walker 2, Atkins, Jenkins, Douglas, Seedsman, Lynch
R. Gray, Jonas, Polec, Rockliff, Neade, Ryder | **Best** | Laird, Atkins, Crouch, Talia, Gibbs, Yolmen
Nil | **Injuries** | Walker (glute), Jacobs (back spasms)
Nil | **Reports** | Nil

===== Round 9 =====
Round 9
Friday, 18 May 7:20 pm | **Adelaide** | def. | Western Bulldogs | Adelaide Oval (crowd: 39,407) | Report
3.1 (19); 3.3 (21); 6.6 (42); 9.9 (63) | **Q1; Q2; Q3; Final** | 0.3 (3); 1.7 (13); 1.10 (16); 2.14 (26) | Umpires: Stevic, Williamson, Fleer
Betts 4, Fogarty, Lynch, Poholke, Murphy, Jenkins | **Goals** | Webb, Suckling
Betts, Laird, Ellis-Yolmen, Paul Seedsman, Lynch, Greenwood, Jacobs | **Best** | Macrae, Dahlhaus, Hunter, Bontempelli, Williams
Nil | **Injuries** | Nil
Nil | **Reports** | Nil

===== Round 10 =====
Round 10
Sunday, 27 May 2:50 pm | **Melbourne** | def. | Adelaide | TIO Traeger Park (crowd: 6,989) | Report
7.1 (43); 12.2 (74); 18.6 (114); 23.8 (146) | **Q1; Q2; Q3; Final** | 3.1 (19); 4.2 (26); 5.4 (34); 8.7 (55) | Umpires: Donlon, Deboy, Brown
Hogan 5, Neal-Bullen 3, Petracca 3, Brayshaw 3, Smith 2, Melksham 2, T. McDonald 2, Hannan, Jones, Spargo | **Goals** | Douglas, Betts, Gallucci, Fogarty, Gibson, Jenkins
Brayshaw, Oliver, Lever, Gawn, Viney, Neal-Bullen, Hogan | **Best** | Talia, M. Crouch, Laird, Greenwood, Doedee
Nil | **Injuries** | Brown (concussion)
Nil | **Reports** | Nil

===== Round 11 =====
Round 11
Sunday, 3 June 4:10 pm | Adelaide | def. by | **Greater Western Sydney** | Adelaide Oval (crowd: 44,120) | Report
4.3 (27); 6.7 (43); 9.10 (64); 11.15 (81) | **Q1; Q2; Q3; Final** | 3.5 (23); 9.7 (61); 11.10 (76); 14.13 (97) | Umpires: Fisher, Meredith, Harris
Douglas 2, Betts 2, Seedsman 2, Murphy, Milera, Atkins, Jenkins, Fogarty | **Goals** | Griffen 3, Langdon 3, Cameron 3, Coniglio 2, Lobb, Himmelberg, Shiel
Gibbs, M. Crouch, Laird, Douglas, Gibson | **Best** | Shiel, Kelly, Coniglio, Whitfield, Patton, Cameron, Langdon
Lynch (side strain), Douglas (eye) | **Injuries** | Coniglio (concussion)
Nil | **Reports** | Nil

===== Round 12 =====
Round 12
Sunday, 10 June 2:40 pm | **Fremantle** | def. | Adelaide | Optus Stadium (crowd: 33,421) | Report
5.2 (32); 5.6 (36); 9.8 (62); 10.11 (71) | **Q1; Q2; Q3; Final** | 1.4 (10); 7.6 (48); 7.8 (50); 9.14 (68) | Umpires: Margetts, Hosking, Whetton
Cox 4, Sheridan 2, Banfield, Ballantyne, Tucker, Langdon | **Goals** | Jenkins 2, Betts 2, Douglas, Gibson, Walker, Greenwood, Poholke
Cox, Cerra, Langdon, D. Pearce, Hamling, Walters | **Best** | Gibbs, Gibson, Doedee, Betts, Douglas
A. Pearce (broken thumb) | **Injuries** | Brown (ankle)
Walters for headbutting Doedee | **Reports** | Nil

===== Round 13 =====
Round 13
Saturday, 16 June 7:25 pm | **Hawthorn** | def. | Adelaide | Melbourne Cricket Ground (crowd: 26,693) | Report
2.5 (17); 3.9 (27); 10.11 (71); 12.16 (88) | **Q1; Q2; Q3; Final** | 1.2 (8); 3.5 (23); 3.5 (23); 4.8 (32) | Umpires: Stevic, O'Gorman, Stephens, Chamberlain
Sicily 3, Puopolo, Smith, Hardwick, Breust, Shiels, Ceglar, Gunston, Roughead, Burgoyne | **Goals** | Jacobs 2, Betts, Jenkins
Sicily, Mitchell, O'Meara, Breust, Gunston, Impey, McEvoy, Howe | **Best** | Gibbs, Kelly, Crouch, Jacobs
Nil | **Injuries** | Gibson (hamstring), Seedsman (hip)
Nil | **Reports** | Nil

=== Ladder ===
| Pos | Team | Pld | W | L | D | PF | PA | PP | Pts | Qualification |
|---|---|---|---|---|---|---|---|---|---|---|
| 1 | Richmond | 22 | 18 | 4 | 0 | 2143 | 1574 | 136.1 | 72 | 2018 finals |
| 2 | West Coast (P) | 22 | 16 | 6 | 0 | 2012 | 1657 | 121.4 | 64 | 2018 finals |
| 3 | Collingwood | 22 | 15 | 7 | 0 | 2046 | 1699 | 120.4 | 60 | 2018 finals |
| 4 | Hawthorn | 22 | 15 | 7 | 0 | 1972 | 1642 | 120.1 | 60 | 2018 finals |
| 5 | Melbourne | 22 | 14 | 8 | 0 | 2299 | 1749 | 131.4 | 56 | 2018 finals |
| 6 | Sydney | 22 | 14 | 8 | 0 | 1822 | 1664 | 109.5 | 56 | 2018 finals |
| 7 | Greater Western Sydney | 22 | 13 | 8 | 1 | 1898 | 1661 | 114.3 | 54 | 2018 finals |
| 8 | Geelong | 22 | 13 | 9 | 0 | 2045 | 1554 | 131.6 | 52 | 2018 finals |
| 9 | North Melbourne | 22 | 12 | 10 | 0 | 1950 | 1790 | 108.9 | 48 | |
| 10 | Port Adelaide | 22 | 12 | 10 | 0 | 1780 | 1654 | 107.6 | 48 | |
| 11 | Essendon | 22 | 12 | 10 | 0 | 1932 | 1838 | 105.1 | 48 | |
| **12** | Adelaide | **22** | **12** | **10** | **0** | **1941** | **1865** | **104.1** | 48 | |
| 13 | Western Bulldogs | 22 | 8 | 14 | 0 | 1575 | 2037 | 77.3 | 32 | |
| 14 | Fremantle | 22 | 8 | 14 | 0 | 1556 | 2041 | 76.2 | 32 | |
| 15 | Brisbane Lions | 22 | 5 | 17 | 0 | 1825 | 2049 | 89.1 | 20 | |
| 16 | St Kilda | 22 | 4 | 17 | 1 | 1606 | 2125 | 75.6 | 18 | |
| 17 | Gold Coast | 22 | 4 | 18 | 0 | 1308 | 2182 | 59.9 | 16 | |
| 18 | Carlton | 22 | 2 | 20 | 0 | 1353 | 2282 | 59.3 | 8 | |

Source: AFL
Rules for classification: 1) points; 2) percentage; 3) number of points for.
(P) Premiers

== AFL Women's ==
Adelaide Football Club
2018 season
- Coach: Bec Goddard (2nd season)
- Captains: Erin Phillips (2nd season); Chelsea Randall (2nd season)
- Home ground: Norwood Oval (Capacity: 22,000); TIO Stadium (Capacity: 12,500)
- AFL season: 5th
- Club Champion: Chelsea Randall
- Highest home attendance: 11,120 vs. Brisbane Lions (3 February 2018)
- Lowest home attendance: 2,159 vs. Fremantle (17 February 2018)
- Average home attendance: 6,037.25

=== List changes ===
==== Retirements and delistings ====
| **Player** | **Date** | **Reason** | **Career games** | **Career goals** | **Ref.** |
| Heather Anderson | 25 May 2017 | Delisted | 8 | 0 | |
| Jasmine Anderson | 25 May 2017 | Delisted | 0 | 0 | |
| Sophie Armitstead | 25 May 2017 | Delisted | 1 | 0 | |
| Lauren O'Shea | 25 May 2017 | Delisted | 0 | 0 | |
| Kellie Gibson | 26 May 2017 | Delisted | 8 | 4 | |
| Monique Hollick | 26 May 2017 | Delisted | 3 | 0 | |
| Tayla Thorn | 26 May 2017 | Delisted | 5 | 0 | |

==== Women's draft ====
| **Round** | **Pick** | **Player** | **State** | **Ref.** |
| 1 | 8 | Jessica Allan | SA | |
| 2 | 16 | Jasmyn Hewett | NT | |
| 3 | 24 | Eloise Jones | SA | |
| 4 | 32 | Marijana Rajcic | SA | |
| 5 | 38 | Ruth Wallace | SA | |
| 6 | 42 | Rheanne Lugg | ACT | |

==== Undrafted free agents ====
| **Player** | **Recruited from** | **League** | **Ref.** |
| Sophie Armitstead | Adelaide | AFL Women's | |

==== Rookies ====
===== Rookie draft =====
| **Round** | **Pick** | **Player** | **Recruited from** | **League** | **Ref.** |
| 1 | 8 | Calista Boyd | Wanderers | NTFL | |
| 2 | 15 | Brianna Walling | Morphettville Park | Adelaide FL | |

===== Rookie signings =====
| **Player** | **Date** | **Other/former sport** | **Ref.** |
| Becchara Palmer | 2 June 2017 | Beach volleyball | |

=== Squad ===
Adelaide Football Club · AFL Women's personnel
| Senior list | | Rookie list | Coaching staff |
|---|---|---|---|
| 1 Caitlin Gould; 2 Eloise Jones; 6 Hannah Munyard; 7 Keeley Kustermann; 8 India Rasheed; 9 Hannah Ewings; 10 Ebony Marinoff (c); 11 Sarah Goodwin; 12 Chelsea Biddell; 13 Kiera Mueller; 15 Danielle Ponter; 16 Georgia McKee; 17 Maddi Newman; 18 Brooke Smith | 20 Grace Kelly; 21 Lily Tarlinton; 23 Niamh Kelly; 25 Teah Charlton; 26 Chelsea Randall; 28 Brooke Tonon; 32 Jess Allan; 39 Sarah Allan (c); Alicia Blizard; Chloe Bown; Grace Egan; Olivia Gorman; Ava Stewart; Lucy Waye | 19 Christina Leuzzi; 22 Kayleigh Cronin; 24 Amy Boyle-Carr | **Head coach**: Ryan Davis; **Assistant coaches**: Marijana Randall (back line); Kieran Strachan (midfield/ruck); Courtney Cramey (midfield/development); Emma Sampson (development); Warwick Raymond (tackling); Legend: (c) Captain(s); (vc) Vice-captain(s); italics – Inactive; Long-term injury; Updated: 20 April 2026; Source(s): |

=== Season summary ===
The full fixture for the 2018 AFL Women's season was announced on 27 October 2017. Four of the seven games were home games for the Crows, three of them played at Norwood Oval and the final home game at TIO Stadium in Darwin. The unfurling of their premiership flag took place in round one in a 2017 AFL Women's Grand Final rematch against the Brisbane Lions.

In the absence of co-captain and reigning club champion Erin Phillips due to a quad injury, along with other key players, the Crows lost their first two matches to Brisbane Lions and Melbourne, delivering a heavy blow to their chances of defending their premiership. In round 3 Phillips returned for the Crows' match against the Western Bulldogs and kicked four goals, the Crows winning their first match of the season in a close contest that came down to the final minutes of the game. After this the Crows went undefeated until the final round of the season with a draw against the Greater Western Sydney and wins against Carlton and Fremantle. They needed to win their final match against Collingwood to make it to the Grand Final, but despite leading at half-time they lost the match by 21 points and finished the season in fifth.

| **Rd** | **Date and local time** | **Opponent** | **Scores** (Adelaide's scores indicated in **bold**) | | | **Venue** | **Attendance** | **Report** |
| **Rd** | **Date and local time** | **Opponent** | Home | Away | Result | **Venue** | **Attendance** | **Report** |
| 1 | Saturday, 3 February (6:45 pm) | Brisbane Lions | **3.1 (19)** | 4.7 (31) | Lost by 12 points | Norwood Oval (H) | 11,120 | |
| 2 | Saturday, 10 February (5:05 pm) | Melbourne | 8.8 (56) | **4.0 (24)** | Lost by 32 points | Casey Fields (A) | 3,800 | |
| 3 | Saturday, 17 February (1:35 pm) | Western Bulldogs | **6.5 (41)** | 5.4 (34) | Won by 7 points | Norwood Oval (H) | 4,900 | |
| 4 | Sunday, 25 February (4:35 pm) | Greater Western Sydney | 2.7 (19) | **2.7 (19)** | Match drawn | Blacktown International Sportspark (A) | 2,409 | |
| 5 | Saturday, 3 March (6:40 pm) | Carlton | **8.7 (55)** | 2.8 (20) | Won by 35 points | Norwood Oval (H) | 5,970 | |
| 6 | Friday, 9 March (5:35 pm) | Fremantle | **6.4 (40)** | 5.6 (36) | Won by 4 points | TIO Stadium (H) | 2,159 | |
| 7 | Sunday, 18 March (2:35 pm) | Collingwood | 8.5 (53) | **4.8 (32)** | Lost by 21 points | Olympic Park Oval (A) | 2,253 | |

==== Round 1 ====
The season opener was a re-match of the 2017 AFL Women's Grand Final, which the Crows had won to claim the inaugural AFL Women's premiership cup. The Crows went into the game missing Courtney Cramey and Abbey Holmes due to injury, and Jenna McCormick due to her W-League duties, then co-captain and 2017 AFLW Best and Fairest Erin Phillips was a late withdrawal due to a quad injury. This damaged the Crows' ability to win the ball through the midfield and left gaps in their team structure, allowing Lion Sabrina Frederick-Traub to dominate in Brisbane's forward line. The Crows failed to score in the first quarter, but took the lead going into half-time thanks to goals to Jones, Wallace and Randall. Despite having the momentum, the Crows failed to score in the second half while Brisbane scored 3.3 and won the match by 12 points as a result.

Round 1
Saturday, 3 February (6:45 pm) | Adelaide | def. by | **Brisbane Lions** | Norwood Oval (crowd: 11,120) | Report
0.0 (0); 3.1 (19); 3.1 (19); 3.1 (19) | **Q1; Q2; Q3; Final** | 1.2 (8); 1.3 (9); 3.6 (24); 4.7 (31) | Umpires: Crosby, McPhee, Dore; Television broadcast: Seven Network
Jones, Wallace, Randall | **Goals** | Wuetschner 2, Conway, Ashmore
Randall, Marinoff, Varnhagen, Foley | **Best** | Frederick-Traub, Lutkins, Zielke, Stanton, Ashmore, Wuetschner
Nil | **Injuries** | Nil
Nil | **Reports** | Nil

==== Round 2 ====
The Crows went into Round 2 again without Phillips due to her quad injury and they were outclassed by Melbourne. After keeping close with Melbourne for the first quarter, but the Demons kicked four goals to one against the wind in the second quarter to reach an unassailable lead. Melbourne's midfield trio of Elise O'Dea, Daisy Pearce and Karen Paxman dominated the game, collecting 54 possessions between them. The Crows lost by 32 points, and senior coach Bec Goddard emphasized after the match that it wasn't solely due to the team missing Phillips.

Round 2
Saturday, 10 February (5:05 pm) | **Melbourne** | def. | Adelaide | Casey Fields (crowd: 3,800) | Report
1.1 (7); 5.2 (32); 7.4 (46); 8.8 (56) | **Q1; Q2; Q3; Final** | 1.0 (6); 2.0 (12); 3.0 (18); 4.0 (24) | Umpires: Gibson, McGinness, Heffernan; Television broadcast: Fox Footy
Cunningham 2, Newman 2, Scott, L. Pearce, Hickey, Cranston | **Goals** | Holmes, Hewett, Wallace, McCormick
Paxman, O'Dea, Jakobsson, Hore, Mithen, D. Pearce | **Best** | Marinoff, Cox, Randall, Varnhagen
Nil | **Injuries** | Nil
Nil | **Reports** | Nil

==== Round 3 ====
Phillips returned from her quad injury to play her first game of the season against the Western Bulldogs and dominated the match, kicking four of Adelaide's six goals. In addition the Crows moved forward Sarah Perkins into the midfield with great effect after she had struggled to make an impact in the first two rounds. In the last quarter the Crows gained a one-point lead only for the Bulldogs to control the flow of play for six or seven minutes late in the game. The Crows' defense held them to just one point which leveled the scores. At the end of the game Rachael Killian kicked a behind to put the Crows in front and Jenna McCormick kicked her second goal after the siren to give Adelaide their first win of the season and keep their premiership defense alive.

Round 3
Saturday, 17 February (1:35 pm) | **Adelaide** | def. | Western Bulldogs | Norwood Oval (crowd: 4,900) | Report
1.1 (7); 2.2 (14); 4.4 (28); 6.5 (41) | **Q1; Q2; Q3; Final** | 2.1 (13); 3.1 (19); 5.3 (33); 5.4 (34) | Umpires: Young, Broadbent, Newell; Television broadcast: Fox Footy
Phillips 4, McCormick 2 | **Goals** | Brennan 2, Kearney, Utri, Lochland
Phillips, Randall, Marinoff, Perkins, S. Allan, Metcalfe | **Best** | Blackburn, Kearney, Utri, Conti, Lochland, Brennan
Nil | **Injuries** | Brennan (leg)
Cox (striking) | **Reports** | Nil

==== Round 4 ====
The round 4 match was a wet and low-scoring affair. After only three goals were scored in the first half, none were scored at all in the third quarter. The Crows went into the final quarter nine points down before scoring the first ten points of the quarter to lead by a point. The Giants scored just one point for the quarter and drew the game. During the match, Ebony Marinoff broke the AFLW tackles record with 21 tackles, more than had ever been recorded in a single AFL or AFLW game.

Round 4
Sunday, 25 February (4:35 pm) | Greater Western Sydney | drew with | Adelaide | Blacktown International Sportspark (crowd: 2,409) | Report
1.1 (7); 2.3 (15); 2.6 (18); 2.7 (19) | **Q1; Q2; Q3; Final** | 1.1 (7); 1.2 (8); 1.3 (9); 2.7 (19) | Television broadcast: Fox Footy
Beeson, Staunton | **Goals** | Cramey, Wallace
Eva, Staunton, Beeson, Barr | **Best** | Marinoff, Randall, Wallace, Foley

==== Round 5 ====
After being at the bottom of the ladder after their draw against the Giants, the Crows needed to win in order to keep their premiership defense alive. After a tight start to the game, the Crows broke free in the second quarter, scoring three goals in just two minutes to extend their lead to 23 points by three-quarter time. Despite not scoring in the third quarter, they only conceded three points and finished with a 35-point win. During the second quarter, Phillips left the ground in the second quarter to look after her quad, which still hadn't fully recovered from her earlier injury. The win took Adelaide from eighth to fifth on the ladder, only half a game below second, the spot they needed to finish to make it into the Grand Final.

Round 5
Saturday, 3 March (6:40 pm) | **Adelaide** | def. | Carlton | Norwood Oval (crowd: 5,970) | Report
2.2 (14); 6.3 (39); 6.3 (39); 8.7 (55) | **Q1; Q2; Q3; Final** | 1.4 (10); 2.4 (16); 2.7 (19); 2.8 (20) | Umpires: Mirabile, Strybos, Crosby; Television broadcast: Seven Network
Wallace 3, Jones 2, McCormick, Hewett, Sedunary | **Goals** | Harris, Vescio
Wallace, Randall, Jones, Marinoff, Phillips, Rajcic | **Best** | Loynes, S Hosking, Harris, Moody, Audley, Gay
Phillips (quad), Cramey (hamstring) | **Injuries** | Nil
Nil | **Reports** | Nil

==== Round 6 ====
Due to the weather being very hot and humid (32 degrees Celsius and 71 percent humidity), the quarter-time, half-time and three quarter-time breaks were extended for the match. The match was close, with the lead changing several times throughout the game. Fremantle player Dana Hooker kicked a goal with less than five minutes to go to ensure a close finish, but the Crows held on to win the game by 4 points. With the win they went into the top two for the first time of the season.

Round 6
Friday, 9 March (5:35 pm) | **Adelaide** | def. | Fremantle | TIO Stadium (crowd: 2,159) | Report
3.0 (18); 4.0 (24); 5.1 (31); 6.4 (40) | **Q1; Q2; Q3; Final** | 1.2 (8); 2.4 (16); 4.6 (30); 5.6 (36) | Umpires: Dore, Galbraith, Broadbent; Television broadcast: Fox Footy
Phillips 3, Rajcic, Perkins, Sedunary | **Goals** | Hooker 2, Filocamo, Atkins, Antonio
Allan, Foley, Phillips, Randall, Cramey, Marinoff | **Best** | Hooker, Donnellan, Miller, Antonio, Gooch, Cain
Nil | **Injuries** | Nil
Nil | **Reports** | Nil

==== Round 7 ====
The Crows went into their final match against Collingwood as favourites and were expected to win and make their way into the Grand Final to defend their premiership. Crows co-captain Chelsea Randall suffered a head knock late in the second quarter and was forced to sit out the rest of the match. Randall had been instrumental in getting the Crows their 10-point lead at half-time, and without her they were unable to stop the Collingwood forward line. With less than five minutes remaining in the final quarter the Crows were still within 7 points of the lead and could have won, but they gave away a free kick deep in a ruck contest deep inside Collingwood's forward 50 to concede a goal, which sealed the win for the Magpies. Because of the loss, Adelaide finished fifth on the ladder and missed out on playing in the Grand Final.

Round 7
Sunday, 18 March (2:35 pm) | **Collingwood** | def. | Adelaide | Olympic Park Oval (crowd: 2,300) | Report
1.1 (7); 3.1 (19); 5.3 (33); 8.5 (53) | **Q1; Q2; Q3; Final** | 2.5 (17); 4.6 (30); 4.8 (32); 4.8 (32) | Umpires: Young, Rowe, Guy; Television broadcast: Fox Footy
Garner 3, Bernardi 2, Hope, Kuys, Tesoriero | **Goals** | Wallace, Hatchard, McCormick, Thompson
Garner, Bernardi, Brazill, Lambert, King | **Best** | Phillips, Marinoff, Randall, Allan, Thompson
Nil | **Injuries** | Randall (head knock)
Nil | **Reports** | Nil

=== Ladder ===
| Pos | Team | Pld | W | L | D | PF | PA | PP | Pts | Qualification |
|---|---|---|---|---|---|---|---|---|---|---|
| 1 | Western Bulldogs (P) | 7 | 5 | 2 | 0 | 312 | 219 | 142.5 | 20 | Grand Final |
| 2 | Brisbane | 7 | 4 | 3 | 0 | 248 | 196 | 126.5 | 16 | Grand Final |
| 3 | Melbourne | 7 | 4 | 3 | 0 | 278 | 240 | 115.8 | 16 | |
| 4 | Greater Western Sydney | 7 | 3 | 3 | 1 | 224 | 242 | 92.6 | 14 | |
| **5** | Adelaide | **7** | **3** | **3** | **1** | **230** | **249** | **92.4** | 14 | |
| 6 | Collingwood | 7 | 3 | 4 | 0 | 281 | 254 | 110.6 | 12 | |
| 7 | Fremantle | 7 | 3 | 4 | 0 | 230 | 256 | 89.8 | 12 | |
| 8 | Carlton | 7 | 2 | 5 | 0 | 173 | 320 | 54.1 | 8 | |

Source: AFL.com.au
Rules for classification: 1) points; 2) percentage; 3) number of points for.
(P) Premiers

== See also ==
- 2018 Adelaide Crows pre-season camp
