= 2018 Adelaide Crows pre-season camp =

Sport training event

The 2018 Adelaide Crows pre-season camp was a summer camp undertaken by players of the Adelaide Football Club from January 29 to February 2 in the lead-up to the 2018 AFL season. Run by Collective Mind, a consultancy group based in Queensland, the camp was designed to strengthen the mental toughness of the players, a lack of which was blamed by Adelaide's Head of Football Brett Burton and coach Don Pyke for their loss in the 2017 AFL Grand Final.

According to some reports, the camp was "cult-like", and ultimately caused the departure of many senior officials, including both Burton and Pyke. It was said to have had the opposite of its intended team building effect, and contributed to a rapid deterioration in Adelaide's onfield form.

Information on the events of the camp was limited until a July 2020 article by journalist Sam McClure, who obtained details from various former Adelaide players. In February 2022, Nine Entertainment retracted McClure's July 2020 article and other camp-related publications due to a defamation lawsuit from Collective Minds. However, some claims in the publications were later supported or corroborated by players.

== Background ==
Having faced numerous hardships throughout previous seasons such as the murder of coach Phil Walsh and the death of assistant coach Dean Bailey, the Adelaide Football Club had a successful year in 2017 and finished as minor premiers at the end of the 2017 home-and-away season. Captain Taylor Walker was widely regarded as one of the best in the league, and the shock and pain that had been felt by many in the club as a result of the murder of Walsh had been routed into a strong desire to honour his memory by winning a premiership. However, in the Grand Final, when they faced the Richmond Football Club, Adelaide were soundly beaten. Instead of the close match many were anticipating, Adelaide lost by eight goals, after having led by eleven points at quarter-time. The large loss demoralised the playing group, with many being unable to face the media. Nevertheless, there was a strong feeling that Adelaide would bounce back from the loss and perform well again the next season.

=== Collective Minds ===
Collective Minds is a consultancy group based in Queensland, which is "hired by sporting teams and businesses to build a mentally resilient culture", had worked with Adelaide throughout the 2017 season, and had generally been perceived as effective, if unorthodox. On one occasion after the Grand Final loss, they had every player run successive 100-metre sprints while the theme song of the Richmond Football Club played on repeat over loudspeakers. Collective Minds and the Adelaide Football Club had a multi-year regimen with each other. Prior to the camp, Crows players were made to sign non-disclosure agreements barring them from publicly discussing the events of the camp.

== Allegations about the camp ==
The camp, run by Collective Minds and masterminded by Head of Football at Adelaide Brett Burton and Amon Woulfe, a self-proclaimed "coach, facilitator and trainer", who is not a registered psychologist, took place in a forest about an hour's drive away from Broadbeach, Queensland, a suburb of Gold Coast. It was run with the intention of strengthening the mental capabilities of the players, which had been blamed by senior staff as the cause for their Grand Final loss. The players were not told where they were going prior to the trip. Players were divided into three groups, based on their playing experience, prior to the journey to the camp. Group One, consisting of the more senior Adelaide players, namely Eddie Betts, Matt Crouch, Richard Douglas, Bryce Gibbs, Kyle Hartigan, Josh Jenkins, Tom Lynch, Rory Sloane, Daniel Talia and captain Walker, were the target of the most severe regimen. The second group, consisting of Mitch McGovern, Curtly Hampton, Paul Seedsman and Brodie Smith, had a less severe experience, though it was still described as "weird". The third group, consisting of the more junior players, were subject to what was deemed to be a regular fitness camp. Players were housed in tepees for the duration of the camp. According to an unnamed Adelaide insider who was quoted by the Herald Sun, the camp was "like a trance", with this unnamed insider also claiming that players had had difficulty remembering what had occurred on the camp.

=== Experience of Group 1 ===
Upon entering the bus that was to carry them from Broadbeach to the camp, Group 1 was alarmed to be greeted by men wearing combat uniforms and holding what appeared to be automatic firearms, though the guns were revealed to be fake. The players were then blindfolded, and were driven for an hour until they arrived at the camp. Upon arrival they had their blindfolds removed, and were greeted by roughly 25 camp workers, who refused to reveal the location at which they were. Among the first exercises performed by Group 1 was an exercise in which players were told to find a partner and stare at their eyes, alternating which eye they were staring at. During the middle of this exercise, Tom Lynch collapsed. He was taken to a bed, where he started to vomit. Despite his condition, camp workers refused to call for medical attention, claiming that he was only suffering from dizziness. Lynch was only given medical assistance upon the demands of the players, and club doctor Marc Cesana, who was not at the camp and did not know where it was located, was contacted and made to drive to the location and bring Lynch back to Broadbeach to provide medical attention.

=== Experience of Group 2 and Group 3 ===
Groups 2 and 3 were subject to a less severe experience than Group 1, with them arriving a day after Group 1 . They were not blindfolded on the drive there, though they were ordered to keep their heads down for the entire trip, while heavy metal music played over loudspeakers.

=== Talking stick ===
During the first night of the camp, all players were asked to publicly divulge their weaknesses using an Aboriginal Australian digging stick as a Talking stick. Eddie Betts, Cam Ellis-Yolmen, Wayne Milera and Curtly Hampton, all of whom are Aboriginal, found this action culturally offensive, and it only contributed to their distaste for the camp. Collective Minds has admitted that using the digging stick in the way that they did was a mistake.

=== Wolfgang ===
According to journalist Sam McClure of The Age, before sunrise on the second day of camp, players were woken up and taken to a worker in the woods, who introduced himself as "Wolfgang". One by one, players were then tied to a tree. The only way for a player to free himself was to crawl to a knife located 10 metres away.

While they were attempting to reach the knife, nine of their teammates would hurl abuse at them. This abuse was deeply personal, with barbs calling back to childhood trauma, relationship issues and domestic abuse that had been gleaned from info leaked to the managers of the camp without the consent of the players, derived from confidential disclosures players had made to Adelaide staff. In some cases, this information was confidential to the extent that players had not divulged it to their spouses. Betts claimed in his autobiography The Boy from Boomerang Crescent that he received insults from camp instructors regarding his upbringing and his mother. Jeff Bond, former Chief Psychologist for the Australian Institute of Sport, told The Age that "Using people's personal trauma to drive them is so illogical and dangerous it's not funny". Bond also compared many of the measures taken in the camp to ones used for training commandos in the military. Adelaide themselves have "strongly disputed" this version of events.

=== Social interactions ===
Social interaction at the camp was extremely limited, players were ordered not to talk with each other when not performing exercises, and as all phones had been confiscated most players had zero contact with the outside world. The only outside contact allowed was for players who had pregnant spouses, who were allowed a few minutes a day to speak.

== Aftermath ==
The camp was not effective in improving the results of the Adelaide Football Club. Adelaide had a poor 2018 season, finishing 12th on the ladder and missing the finals. Midway through the 2018 season, Adelaide cut all ties with Collective Minds, who claimed that the decision was mutual. After the cutting of ties, Adelaide coach Don Pyke admitted that the camp was a failure. Several Adelaide players left the club over the next few seasons. Among the most notable departures were Eddie Betts, who had declared "That [camp] was one of the main reasons why it was so hard to enjoy footy", and returned to his old club Carlton; and Mitch McGovern, who left the club after the 2018 season, also to play for Carlton. In June 2020, McGovern's manager Colin Young singled out the camp as the singular reason for McGovern leaving the club. All in all, 8 out of Adelaide's best 22 players in 2017 left the club as of July 2020, a turnover amount described as an "exodus". Pyke also left the club, resigning at the end of the 2019 season after another subpar season, with Brett Burton and assistant coach Scott Camporeale being sacked a month later. In the 2020 season, the Crows finished last, earning their first ever wooden spoon.

In September 2020, Collective Minds sued Nine Entertainment for defamation. As a result, Nine retracted 13 publications about the camp in February 2022.

In August 2022, Eddie Betts released a biography containing previously unknown revelations about what happened at the camp. In response the Adelaide Football Club publicly apologised to him. Following the release of Betts's biography, Josh Jenkins released a statement with further details from the camp. His opposition to aspects of the camp led to him being ostracised and was the reason he left the club. Bryce Gibbs also spoke out about events that transpired at the camp.
