= Gallucci =

Gallucci (Italian: [ɡalˈluttʃi]) is an Italian surname which can also be found in the Italian diaspora. The family name is most prevalent in the Italian regions Campania, Lazio and Lombardy. In Campania the name is toponymic and derived from the municipality of Galluccio as well as connected to the Principality of Capua (900–1156), while in Lazio it can be traced back to the Latin name Gallutius. It should be distinguished from the similar names Galluccio, Galluzzi and Galluzzo.

== Geographical distribution ==
As of 2014, 38.7% of all known bearers of the surname Gallucci were residents of Italy (frequency 1:14,165), 28.1% of the United States (1:115,490), 13.8% of Argentina (1:27,792), 9.0% of Brazil (1:204,512), 3.5% of Canada (1:94,354), 1.6% of Venezuela (1:165,051), 1.4% of England (1:365,788), 1.1% of France (1:527,838) and 1.0% of Switzerland (1:76,747).

In Italy, the frequency of the surname was higher than national average (1:14,165) in the following regions:

1. Basilicata (1:1,999)
2. Marche (1:3,022)
3. Calabria (1:3,713)
4. Abruzzo (1:5,216)
5. Aosta Valley (1:5,308)
6. Campania (1:5,916)
7. Molise (1:8,162)
8. Lazio (1:11,237)

== People ==
- Dann Gallucci (born 1975), American songwriter, producer, musician and audio engineer
- Ed Gallucci (born 1947), American photographer
- Fulgenzio Gallucci (1570–1632), Italian Catholic prelate
- Giosue Gallucci (1864–1915), American crime boss
- Jordan Gallucci (born 1998), Australian footballer
- Robert Gallucci (born 1946), American academic and diplomat
- Santiago Gallucci (born 1991), Argentine footballer
