= Gallozzi =

Gallozzi is an Italian surname. Notable people with the surname include:

- Guillaume Gallozzi (1958–1995), French art dealer
- Marco Gallozzi (born 1988), Italian footballer

== See also ==
- Galluzzi
