= Galluccio (surname) =

Galluccio is an Italian surname. Notable people with the surname include:

- Anthony D. Galluccio (born 1967), politician in Massachusetts
- Miguel Galluccio (born 1968), Argentine petroleum engineer and director of YPF
- Steve Galluccio (born 1960), Canadian screenwriter
