= Jordan Gallucci =

Australian rules footballer (born 1998)

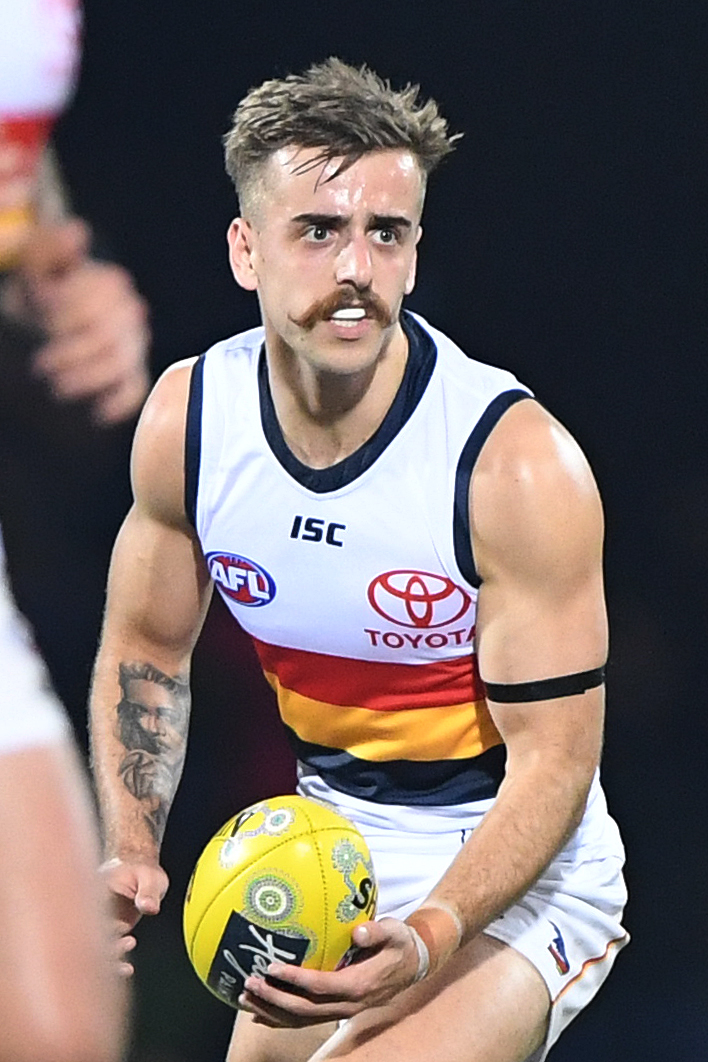
- Gallucci in June 2019

Personal information
- Full name: Jordan Gallucci
- Born: 4 May 1998 (age 28)
- Original team: Eastern Ranges (TAC Cup)
- Draft: No. 15, 2016 national draft
- Debut: Round 9, 2017, Adelaide vs. Brisbane Lions, at the Gabba
- Height: 182 cm (6 ft 0 in)
- Weight: 76 kg (168 lb)
- Position: Midfielder

Playing career^{1}
Years	Club	Games (Goals)
2017–2020	Adelaide	27 (19)
- ^{1} Playing statistics correct to the end of 2020 season.

Jordan Gallucci (born 4 May 1998) is a former professional Australian rules footballer, last playing for the Adelaide Football Club in the Australian Football League (AFL). He was drafted by Adelaide with their first selection and fifteenth overall in the 2016 national draft. He made his debut in the 80-point win against the Brisbane Lions at the Gabba in round nine of the 2017 season.

== Early life ==
Gallucci grew up in the hills to the east of Melbourne. He attended Yarra Valley Grammar School where he also starred at volleyball as well as football. In 2016 he captained the Eastern Ranges in the TAC Cup where he impressed as a midfielder-forward, kicking five goals and getting 21 disposals against the Western Jets late in the season. He was also a co-captain of Vic Metro in the 2016 AFL Under 18 Championships, where he ranked second out of all mid-forwards for metres gained.

Gallucci was part of the 2016 Draft Combine, where he broke the record in the standing vertical jump test, reaching 89 cm. This broke the previous record of 88 cm and was 13 cm above any others at the combine that year. He also won the repeat sprint test and was in the top ten of both the running vertical jump test and the beep test. In the leadup to the 2016 AFL draft, Gallucci attracted interest from the Adelaide Football Club.

== AFL career ==
Gallucci was drafted by the Adelaide Football Club with their first pick in the 2016 AFL National Draft, the fifteenth selection overall. His good friend Myles Poholke was also drafted by the Crows with their second draft pick. When he joined the team, Gallucci was given the number 7 jumper, which had previously been worn by dual premiership player Nigel Smart and club captain Nathan van Berlo.

Gallucci got his first opportunity to play for Adelaide in the 2017 JLT Community Series. After being left out of the Crows’ side for the opening match, he played against Geelong, where he had nine possessions, including five in the last quarter, in a thrilling six-point win. Once the AFL season started he was playing for the Crows’ reserves team in the SANFL. In the first match of the season against Sturt, he performed a full-body smother to help save the match, leading to a two-point victory for the Crows. In an SANFL game against South Adelaide he injured his shin and was unable to play in the second half, which caused him to miss the next game, but he was able to return for the SANFL Showdown against Port Adelaide’s reserves team. He returned from injury well and finished with 24 disposals and five clearances against the Magpies.

Gallucci made his AFL debut in an eighty-point win against the Brisbane Lions at the Gabba in round nine. He finished with 11 possessions and a goal for the match, which wasn’t enough to retain his position in the side as he was omitted from the team the next week. He was selected as a non-playing emergency against Fremantle, then returned to the SANFL side.

Gallucci was among Adelaide’s best in the second SANFL Showdown of the season, with 24 possessions and seven tackles to his name in a 58-point loss, the side’s worst loss since joining the SANFL. As his form continued to improve, he started to be selected more regularly as an emergency for AFL matches, but his season came to a premature end when he was put on the long-term injury list after breaking his jaw in a SANFL match against Woodville-West Torrens and was ruled out for the rest of the season.

Gallucci was delisted by Adelaide at the end of 2020 and he moved to Williamstown in the VFL where he played 24 games and kicked 17 goals in 2021 and 2022.

== Player profile ==
As a junior, Gallucci was an outstanding athlete. He played as a midfielder capable of carrying the ball with pace, but also had the versatility to play across half-forward. He was a good mark with his powerful leap and had a strong work ethic. He showed leadership skills as well, being a co-captain of Vic Metro in the 2016 AFL Under 18 Championships and also captaining the Eastern Ranges in the TAC Cup. He was described by four-time Hawthorn premiership player Gary Buckenara as a “polished player who has good pace and is very athletic”, and his Eastern Ranges coach, former Essendon premiership player Darren Bewick, compared him favourably to 2016 Norm Smith medallist Jason Johannisen.

== Statistics ==
Statistics are correct to the end of the 2020 season

Legend
G	Goals	K	Kicks	D	Disposals	T	Tackles
B	Behinds	H	Handballs	M	Marks

Season	Team	No.	Games	Totals							Averages (per game)						
Season	Team	No.	Games	G	B	K	H	D	M	T	G	B	K	H	D	M	T
2017	Adelaide	7	1	1	0	7	4	11	2	3	1.0	0.0	7.0	4.0	11.0	2.0	3.0
2018	Adelaide	7	16	15	11	146	40	186	42	39	0.9	0.7	9.1	2.5	11.6	2.6	2.4
2019	Adelaide	7	10	3	2	90	32	122	36	15	0.3	0.2	9.0	3.2	12.2	3.6	1.5
2020	Adelaide	7	-	-	-	-	-	-	-	-	-	-	-	-	-	-	-
Career			27	19	13	243	76	319	80	57	0.7	0.5	9.0	2.8	11.8	2.9	2.1
