= Don Pyke =

Australian rules footballer, born 1968

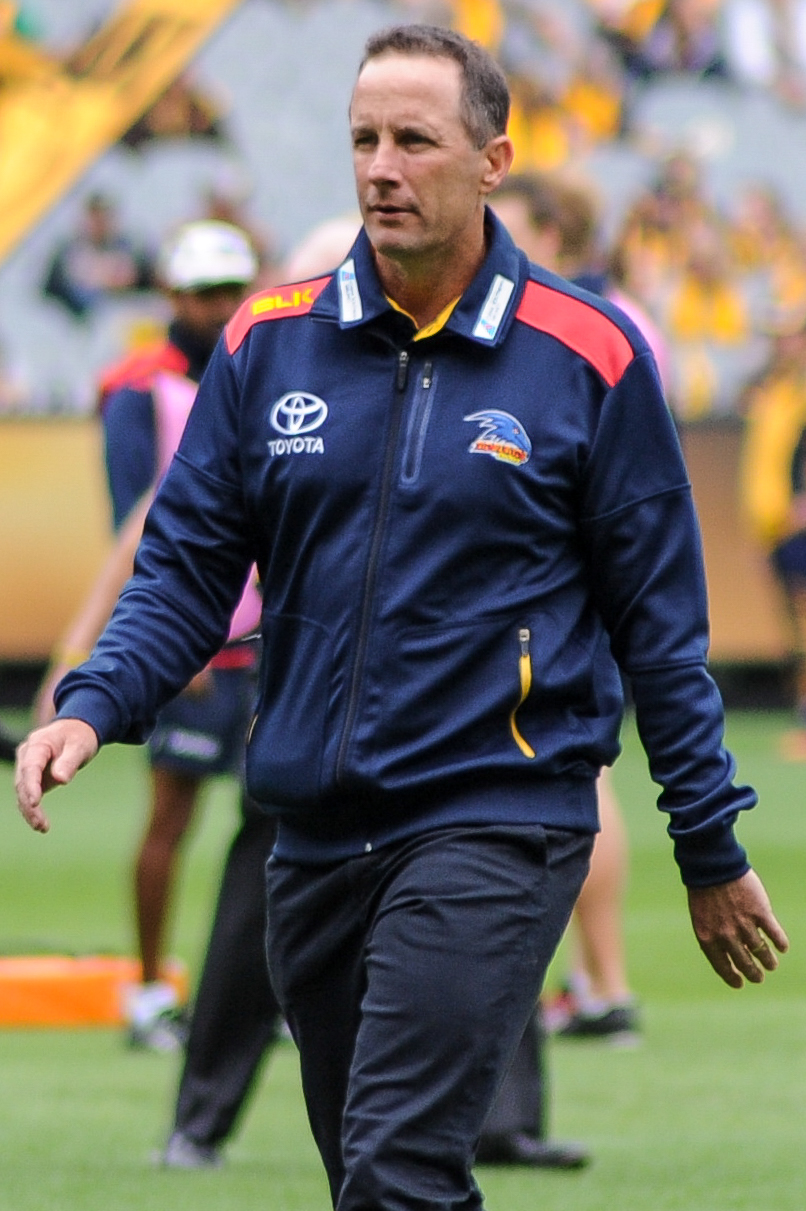
- Pyke in April 2017

Personal information
- Full name: Donald Lachlan Pyke
- Born: 5 December 1968 (age 57); Bloomington, Illinois, U.S.
- Original team: Belconnen
- Draft: No. 2, 1988 pre-draft selection
- Height: 180 cm (5 ft 11 in)
- Weight: 78 kg (172 lb)
- Position: Midfielder

Playing career
Years	Club	Games (Goals)
1987–1996	Claremont	63 (90)
1989–1996	West Coast	132 (70)
Total		195 (160)

Coaching career^{3}
Years	Club	Games (W–L–D)
1999–2000	Claremont (WAFL)	39 (23–16–0)
2016–2019	Adelaide (AFL)	93 (56–36–1)
- ^{3} Coaching statistics correct as of round 23, 2019.

Career highlights
- Club: 2× AFL premiership player: 1992, 1994; West Coast Club Champion: 1993; 2× Claremont Premiership player: 1987, 1996; Claremont Best and Fairest: 1988; West Coast Life Membership: 2003; Coaching: McClelland Trophy: 2017

Donald Lachlan Pyke (born 5 December 1968) is a former Australian rules footballer who is the CEO of the West Coast Eagles in the Australian Football League (AFL). Pyke was the first American-born player in the AFL, playing for West Coast from 1989 to 1996. He would later serve as senior coach of the Adelaide Football Club from 2016 to 2019.

Pyke was recruited by the Claremont Football Club for the 1987 WAFL season, playing in a premiership in his first season and winning the club's best and fairest award in his second season. This led to his recruitment by West Coast, who selected him prior to the 1988 National Draft. Pyke spent eight seasons at the club, playing in premiership sides in both 1992 and 1994, and sharing the Club Champion Award with Glen Jakovich in 1993.

After retiring from playing, Pyke was the senior coach of Claremont from 1999 to 2000. He served as an assistant coach at Adelaide in 2005 and 2006, and later rejoined West Coast as a strategy coach at the end of the 2013 AFL season, under Adam Simpson. He was appointed senior coach of Adelaide in October 2015, replacing Phil Walsh. He coached the team to the 2017 AFL Grand Final, in which they were defeated by Richmond.

== Early life ==
Pyke was born to Frank Pyke and his wife, Janet, on 5 December 1968, in Bloomington, Illinois. His father, who had previously played for Perth in the WAFL, was teaching at Illinois State University, having moved to the United States in 1966 to attend Indiana University. Pyke's other brothers, Stephen and James Pyke, who later played cricket for South Australia, had been born in Australia. Pyke and his family returned to Western Australia in 1972, after his father accepted a role at the University of Western Australia. The family again moved in 1977, to Canberra, where his father had accepted a role as Head of the Centre for Sports Studies at the University of Canberra. Pyke excelled at junior level at both football and cricket, playing for the Belconnen Football Club and representing the ACT cricket team at under-16 and under-19 level.

== WAFL and cricket ==
Pyke was recruited by Claremont for the 1987 season, and played in the club's premiership win over Subiaco. He also represented the Western Australia under-19 cricket team in two matches at the 1987–88 Australian Under-19 Championships, playing alongside future Test cricketers Brendon Julian and Alan Mullally. Pyke won Claremont's best and fairest award (the E. B. Cook Medal) in 1988, playing mainly as an attacking rover.

== AFL playing career ==
=== West Coast Eagles ===
Pyke was recruited by West Coast Eagles with a pre-draft selection in the 1988 VFL Draft. He was one of five pre-draft selections, with the others including future premiership players Peter Sumich, Craig Turley and Scott Watters. Making his debut in round one of the 1989 season, against Essendon at the WACA Ground, Pyke played 16 consecutive games before being dropped after a nine-possession game in round 16 against Sydney. Due to injury and poor form, he only played four games in the 1990 season, under new senior coach Mick Malthouse. In the round two game against St Kilda, Pyke kicked three goals, a career high. Pyke was later developed into a player more renowned for his defensive skills. He was selected to represent NSW/ACT at the 1993 State of Origin Championships. He was a member of the Eagles' Grand Final-losing side and played in both the 1992 and 1994 premiership sides. Pyke was knocked out by Gary Ablett in the early stages of the 1992 grand final, but returned to play an important role in the win. Playing mainly as a tagger, he tied with Glen Jakovich for the 1993 Club Champion Award, also earning seven Brownlow Medal votes, and was runner-up in the best and fairest to Jakovich the next year. A shoulder injury forced his premature retirement from playing in 1996, although he returned to play in Claremont's 1996 premiership side.

Pyke played for West Coast Eagles from 1989 until 1996 for a total of 132 games and kicked a total of 70 goals. Pyke was also a member of the 1992 and 1994 premiership sides.

== Post-playing career and administration career ==
After his retirement, Pyke continued his involvement with West Coast, serving as team runner in 1997 and 1998. He would later become a director at the club from 2001 to 2004, and was rewarded with life membership in 2003.

== Coaching career ==
=== Early career ===
In 1999, Pyke became the senior coach of Claremont until his resignation in 2000.

=== Adelaide Football Club assistant coach (2005–2006) ===
Pyke became an assistant coach under senior coach Neil Craig at Adelaide, whom he had previously interviewed for the Eagles' job. In late 2006, Pyke resigned as Adelaide's assistant coach after two seasons to return to Western Australia, and concentrate on his business.

=== West Coast Eagles assistant coach (2013–2015) ===
In October 2013, he was made an assistant coach at West Coast Eagles, when he returned to his old playing club under the new senior coach Adam Simpson, specialising in "strategy, stoppages, and structure".

=== Adelaide Football Club senior coach (2016–2019) ===
On 9 October 2015, Pyke was appointed as the senior coach of the Adelaide Football Club, succeeding caretaker senior coach Scott Camporeale who succeeded the late Phil Walsh who was murdered midway through the 2015 AFL season. The Crows made the semi-finals in his first season as coach but were defeated by the Sydney Swans. In 2017 Pyke coached the Crows to their second McClelland Trophy and led them to their first AFL Grand Final since 1998, where they were defeated by Richmond by 48 points. On 12 September 2019, Pyke resigned as senior coach of the Adelaide Crows. Pyke was then replaced by Matthew Nicks as senior coach of the Adelaide Football Club.

=== Sydney Swans assistant coach (2021–2023) ===
In October 2020, it was announced that Pyke would join the Sydney Swans as an assistant coach under senior coach John Longmire from the 2021 season.

== Statistics ==
=== Playing statistics ===
Legend
G	Goals	K	Kicks	D	Disposals	T	Tackles
B	Behinds	H	Handballs	M	Marks

Season	Team	No.	Games	Totals							Averages (per game)							Votes
Season	Team	No.	Games	G	B	K	H	D	M	T	G	B	K	H	D	M	T	Votes
1989	West Coast	1	16	14	15	194	67	261	52	17	0.9	0.9	12.1	4.2	16.3	3.3	1.1	0
1990	West Coast	1	4	3	6	39	21	60	0	5	0.8	1.5	9.8	5.3	15.0	0.0	1.3	0
1991	West Coast	10	24	4	11	301	94	395	49	39	0.2	0.5	12.5	3.9	16.5	2.0	1.6	0
1992†	West Coast	10	12	9	3	133	65	198	24	17	0.8	0.3	11.1	5.4	16.5	2.0	1.4	0
1993	West Coast	10	22	12	6	352	112	464	100	42	0.5	0.3	16.0	5.1	21.1	4.5	1.9	7
1994†	West Coast	10	25	13	10	392	114	506	98	48	0.5	0.4	15.7	4.6	20.2	3.9	1.9	5
1995	West Coast	10	21	15	6	255	111	366	50	37	0.7	0.3	12.1	5.3	17.4	2.4	1.8	1
1996	West Coast	10	8	0	1	64	36	100	19	13	0.0	0.1	8.0	4.5	12.5	2.4	1.6	0
Career			132	70	58	1730	620	2350	392	218	0.5	0.4	13.1	4.7	17.8	3.0	1.7	13

== Head coaching record ==
Team	Year	Home and Away Season					Finals			
Team	Year	Won	Lost	Drew	%	Position	Won	Lost	Win %	Result
ADE	2016	16	6	0	.727	5th out of 18	1	1	.500	Lost to Sydney in Semi-Final
ADE	2017	15	6	1	.705	1st out of 18	2	1	.667	Lost to Richmond in Grand Final
ADE	2018	12	10	0	.545	12th out of 18	—	—	—	—
ADE	2019	10	12	0	.455	11th out of 18	—	—	—	—
Total		53	34	1	.608		3	2	.600	

== See also ==
- List of VFL/AFL players born outside Australia
- List of West Coast Eagles players
