= Mitch McGovern =

Australian rules footballer

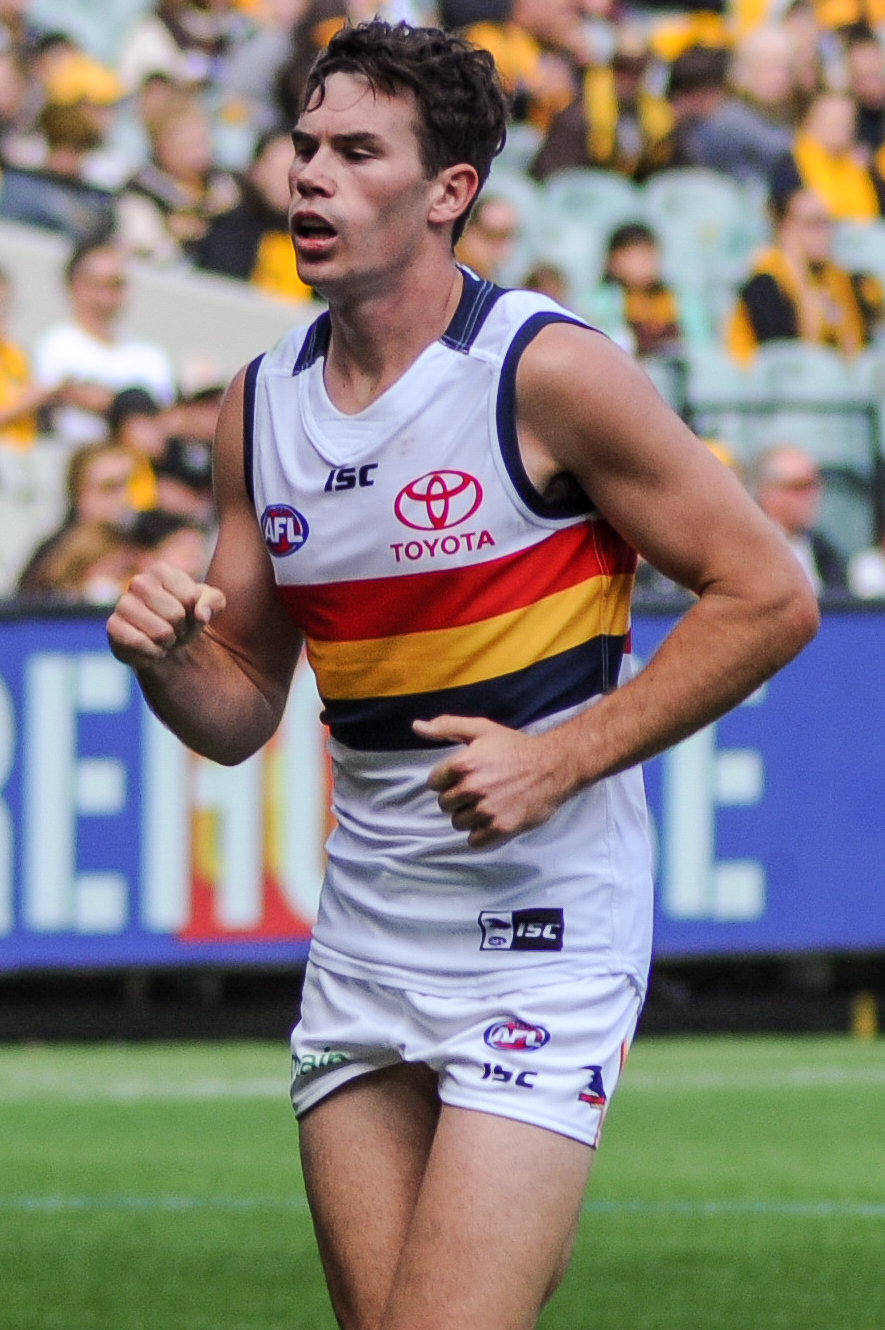
- McGovern playing for Adelaide in April 2017

Personal information
- Full name: Mitchell Gordon McGovern
- Nickname: Brackets
- Born: 11 October 1994 (age 32)
- Original teams: North Albany; Claremont (WAFL)
- Draft: No. 43, 2014 national draft
- Debut: Round 1, 2016, Adelaide vs. North Melbourne, at Etihad Stadium
- Height: 190 cm (6 ft 3 in)
- Weight: 93 kg (205 lb)
- Position: Key Forward/Defender

Club information
- Current club: Carlton
- Number: 11

Playing career^{1}
Years	Club	Games (Goals)
2015–2018	Adelaide	48 (67)
2019–	Carlton	122 (87)
Total		170 (154)
- ^{1} Playing statistics correct to the end of the 2026 season.

Mitchell Gordon McGovern (born 11 October 1994) is a professional Australian rules footballer playing for the Carlton Football Club in the Australian Football League (AFL). He was drafted with the forty-third selection in the 2014 national draft by the Adelaide Football Club from West Australian Football League (WAFL) club Claremont.

== AFL career ==
=== Adelaide ===
In 2015, McGovern's first season at AFL level was interrupted by injuries, but he showed promise in the South Australian National Football League (SANFL), kicking 15 goals in 11 games for Adelaide's reserves side. He made his AFL debut in round 1, 2016 against North Melbourne.

During the last quarter of the Round 3 Showdown in 2017, McGovern injured his hamstring and had to leave the ground for the rest of the match.

In Round 19 2017, McGovern took a large pack mark with approximately two seconds left in the last quarter and goaled after the final siren to draw with Collingwood despite his team at one stage being 50 points down during the match. McGovern's hamstring worries continued early in Adelaide's 2017 finals series, and as a result missed out on their preliminary final against Geelong and the following 2017 Grand Final against Richmond.

=== Carlton ===
After the 2018 season, McGovern informed the Crows he would like to be traded, despite having two years left on his contract. After requesting a trade to Carlton, McGovern was traded on 10 October. Battling through consistent injuries, McGovern played only five games in 2021 and seven games in 2022. McGovern overcame his injury woes and reinvented himself as a footballer, moving down to defence under new coach Michael Voss.

In a 2024 grudge match against Collingwood, McGovern had an opportunity to kick a goal after the siren to win the match for Carlton with his team down by three points. However, McGovern failed to kick a score.

In round 1 of the 2026 AFL season McGovern made a return to the forward line. After having a career-best goalkicking season, McGovern extended his contract for another year to the end of 2027.

== Personal life ==
Mitch is the younger brother of former West Coast player Jeremy McGovern, and the son of former Sydney and Fremantle player Andrew McGovern. Mitch McGovern, after being tutored by Cam Ellis-Yolmen, is proficient at the didgeridoo.

McGovern is the father of two children with wife Kirsten. Their names are Margot and Hamish.

== Statistics ==
Updated to the end of the 2026 season.

Legend
G	Goals	K	Kicks	D	Disposals	T	Tackles
B	Behinds	H	Handballs	M	Marks

Season	Team	No.	Games	Totals							Averages (per game)							Votes
Season	Team	No.	Games	G	B	K	H	D	M	T	G	B	K	H	D	M	T	Votes
2015	Adelaide	41	0	—	—	—	—	—	—	—	—	—	—	—	—	—	—	0
2016	Adelaide	41	23	32	21	142	88	230	96	60	1.4	0.9	6.2	3.8	10.0	4.2	2.6	0
2017	Adelaide	41	13	20	17	105	42	147	66	34	1.5	1.3	8.1	3.2	11.3	5.1	2.6	0
2018	Adelaide	41	12	15	13	124	31	155	78	22	1.3	1.1	10.3	2.6	12.9	6.5	1.8	2
2019	Carlton	11	16	22	11	96	40	136	60	24	1.4	0.7	6.0	2.5	8.5	3.8	1.5	0
2020 (Note: The 2020 season was played with 17 home-and-away matches per team (down from 22) and 16-minute quarters with time on (down from 20-minute quarters with time on) due to the impact of the COVID-19 pandemic.)	Carlton	11	12	9	2	70	18	88	39	21	0.8	0.2	5.8	1.5	7.3	3.3	1.8	0
2021	Carlton	11	5	6	4	42	14	56	24	13	1.2	0.8	8.4	2.8	11.2	4.8	2.6	0
2022	Carlton	11	7	0	1	85	19	104	45	13	0.0	0.1	12.1	2.7	14.9	6.4	1.9	0
2023	Carlton	11	22	2	2	297	82	379	105	54	0.1	0.1	13.5	3.7	17.2	4.8	2.5	0
2024	Carlton	11	18	3	3	244	54	298	85	29	0.2	0.2	13.6	3.0	16.6	4.7	1.6	2
2025	Carlton	11	17	11	3	191	53	244	76	26	0.6	0.2	11.2	3.1	14.4	4.5	1.5	0
2026	Carlton	11	25	34	16	180	79	259	104	47	1.4	0.6	7.2	3.2	10.4	4.2	1.9	0
Career			170	154	93	1577	520	2097	778	343	0.9	0.5	9.3	3.1	12.3	4.6	2.0	4
