= Andrew McPherson (Australian footballer) =

Australian football league player

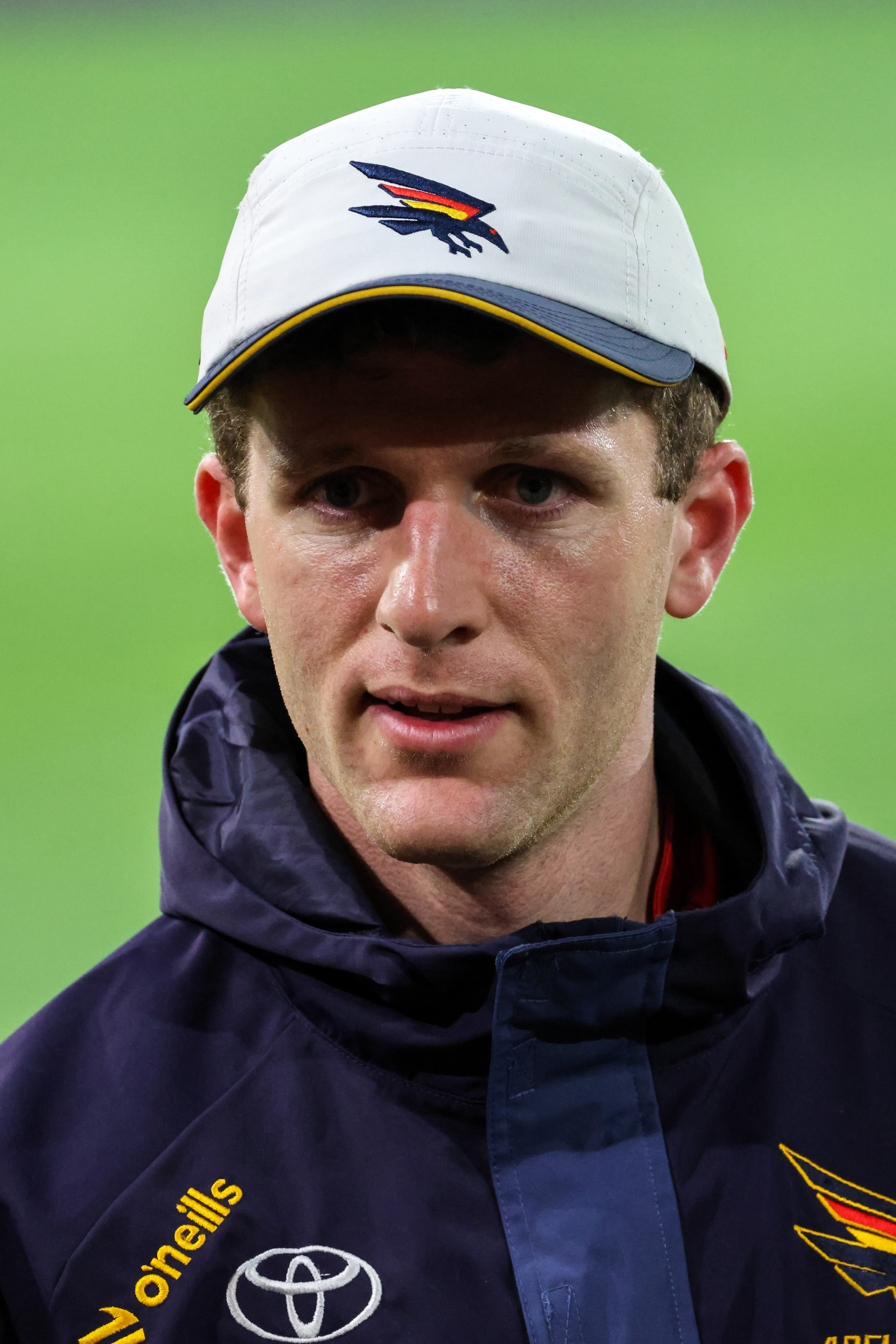
- McPherson in 2026

Personal information
- Born: 20 June 1999 (age 27)
- Original team: Woodville-West Torrens Football Club
- Draft: No. 40, 2017 AFL draft, Adelaide
- Debut: Round 6, 2020, Adelaide vs. West Coast, at the Gabba
- Height: 186 cm (6 ft 1 in)
- Weight: 79 kg (174 lb)
- Position: Defender

Club information
- Current club: Adelaide
- Number: 36

Playing career^{1}
Years	Club	Games (Goals)
2018–2023	Adelaide	28 (0)
- ^{1} Playing statistics correct to the end of 2020.

Andrew McPherson (born 20 June 1999) is a former Australian rules footballer who last played for the Adelaide Football Club in the Australian Football League (AFL). He was recruited by the Adelaide Football Club with the 40th draft pick in the 2017 AFL draft.

== Early Football ==
McPherson played junior football for Port District in the MWJFL. He played all his school football for Christian Brothers College. McPherson also played football for the Port Adelaide Football Club before being rezoned to the Woodville-West Torrens Football Club in the South Australian National Football League, before getting selected by Adelaide.

== AFL career ==
McPherson debuted for Adelaide in Round 6 of the 2020 AFL season, where his team lost to West Coast by 33 points. McPherson picked up 9 disposals and 5 marks on his debut. He signed a two-year contract extension in March 2021.

== Statistics ==
Statistics are correct to round 2, 2021

Legend
G	Goals	K	Kicks	D	Disposals	T	Tackles
B	Behinds	H	Handballs	M	Marks

Season	Team	No.	Games	Totals							Averages (per game)						
Season	Team	No.	Games	G	B	K	H	D	M	T	G	B	K	H	D	M	T
2018	Adelaide	36	0	—	—	—	—	—	—	—	—	—	—	—	—	—	—
2019	Adelaide	36	0	—	—	—	—	—	—	—	—	—	—	—	—	—	—
2020 (Note: The 2020 season was played with 17 home-and-away matches per team (down from 22) and 16-minute quarters with time on (down from 20-minute quarters with time on) due to the impact of the COVID-19 pandemic.)	Adelaide	36	9	0	0	56	58	114	25	15	0.0	0.0	6.2	6.4	12.7	2.8	1.7
2021	Adelaide	36	2	0	0	10	6	16	4	5	0.0	0.0	5.0	3.0	8.0	2.0	2.5
Career			11	0	0	66	64	130	29	20	0.0	0.0	6.0	5.8	11.8	2.6	1.8
