= Brooke Smith (footballer) =

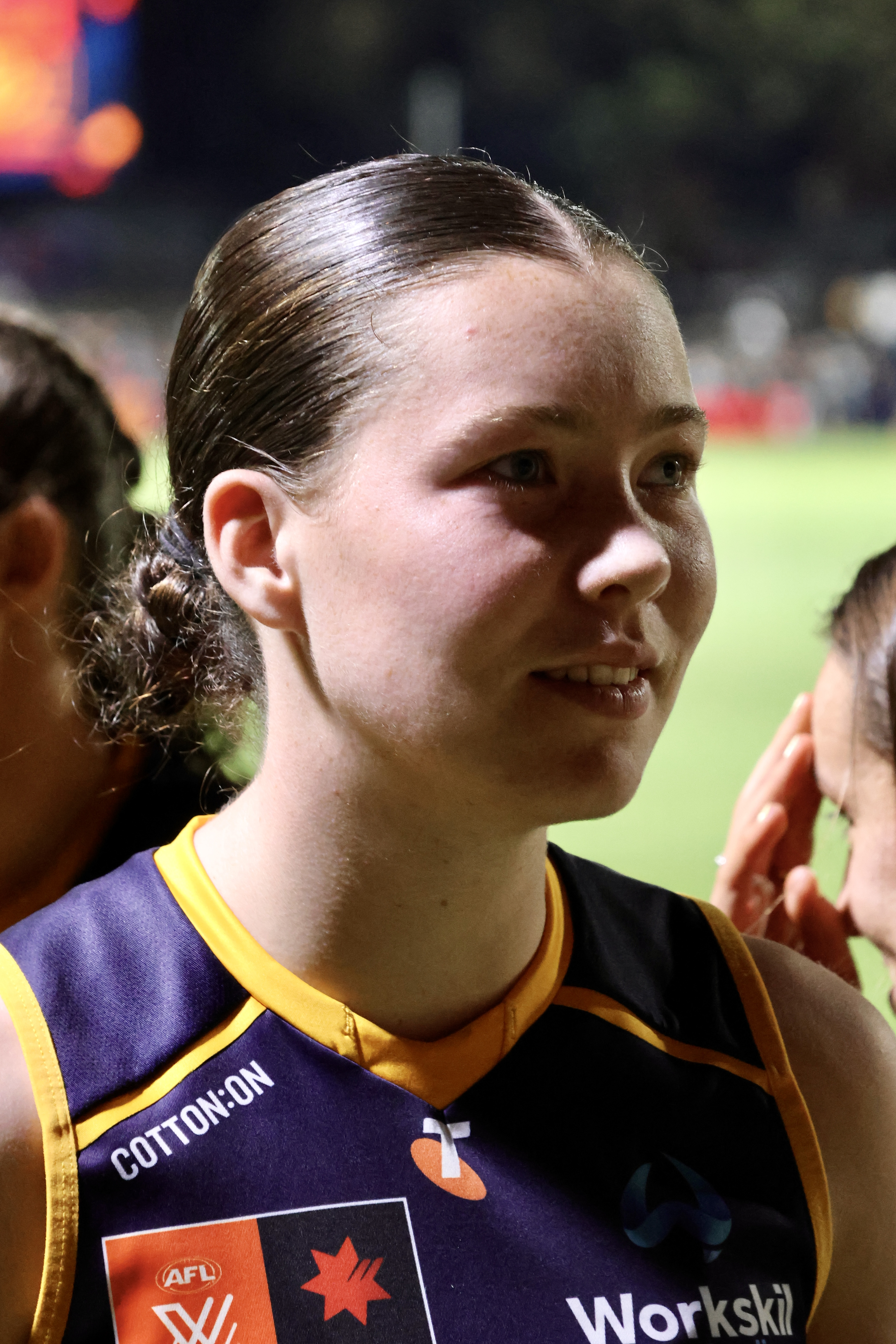
- Smith in 2025

Personal information
- Born: 21 February 2004 (age 22)
- Original teams: Dandenong Stingrays (Talent League); Casey Demons (VFLW)
- Draft: Injury replacement, 2023
- Debut: Round 10, 2023, Adelaide vs. West Coast, at Lathlain Park
- Height: 171 cm (5 ft 7 in)
- Position: Utility

Playing career^{1}
Years	Club	Games (Goals)
2023–2026	Adelaide	6 (0)
- ^{1} Playing statistics correct to the end of 2026.

Brooke Smith (born 21 February 2004) is an Australian rules footballer who played for the Adelaide Football Club in the AFL Women's (AFLW).

== Early life and junior football ==
Before she was recruited by Adelaide, Smith played for the Narre North Foxes, Dandenong Stingrays in the Talent League Girls, Casey Demons in the VFL Women's, Mazenod Old Collegians, Victoria Country in the AFL Women's Under-18 Championships and the VFLW Under-23 All Stars team against the AFLW Academy.

Her junior career was affected by numerous injuries, including an ankle reconstruction and strained quad.

== AFLW career ==
Smith joined Adelaide as an injury-replacement player ahead of the 2023 AFLW season, filling a vacancy created by a long-term injury to forward McKenzie Dowrick. She made her debut in round 10, 2023 against the West Coast Eagles.

In 2024, Smith was retained on Adelaide's list but after two matches her season was cut short after she suffered a fractured collarbone, ruling her out of the remainder of the year.

Prior to the 2026 season, Smith ruptured her anterior cruciate ligament during a training session, ruling her out for the season. After being placed on the inactive list, Smith was replaced by Juliet Kelly. She was delisted at the conclusion of the 2026 season, following six games across four seasons.

== SANFLW and state-league experience ==
Smith was selected by West Adelaide with he first selection in the SANFL Women's League mini-draft, which allocates AFLW-listed players to SANFLW clubs for additional match time.

== Statistics ==
Updated to the end of the 2026 season.

Legend
G	Goals	K	Kicks	D	Disposals	T	Tackles
B	Behinds	H	Handballs	M	Marks

Season	Team	No.	Games	Totals							Averages (per game)						
Season	Team	No.	Games	G	B	K	H	D	M	T	G	B	K	H	D	M	T
2024	Adelaide	18	1	0	0	2	2	4	1	2	0.0	0.0	2.0	2.0	4.0	1.0	2.0
2024	Adelaide	18	2	0	0	3	2	5	1	1	0.0	0.0	1.5	1.0	2.5	0.5	0.5
2025	Adelaide	18	3	0	0	15	8	23	3	7	0.0	0.0	5.0	2.7	7.7	1.0	2.3
2026	Adelaide	18	0	–	–	–	–	–	–	–	–	–	–	–	–	–	–
Career			6	0	0	20	12	32	5	10	0.0	0.0	3.3	2.0	5.3	0.8	3.3
