= Galluzzo (surname) =

Galluzzo is a surname. Notable people with the surname include:

- Benjamin Galluzzo (fl. 2011), American academic
- Giuseppe Galluzzo (born 1960), Italian football coach and player
- Virginia Galluzzo (born 1941), mother of American politician Ginny Foat
