= Sam Gibson (footballer) =

Australian rules footballer

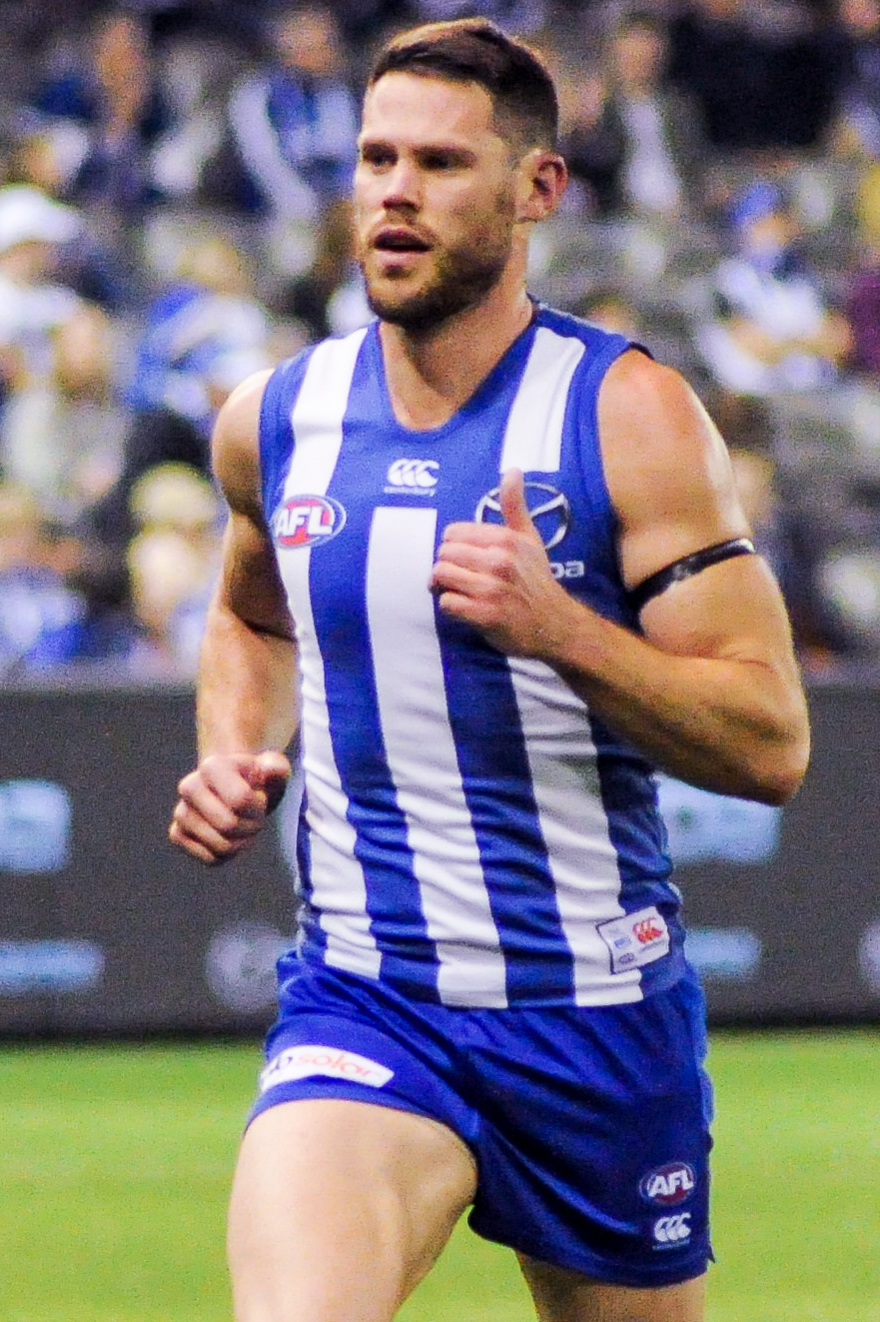
- Gibson playing for North Melbourne in June 2017

Personal information
- Full name: Sam Gibson
- Born: 27 May 1986 (age 40)
- Original team: Box Hill Hawks (VFL)
- Draft: No. 37, 2007 rookie draft No. 63, 2012 rookie draft
- Height: 185 cm (6 ft 1 in)
- Weight: 83 kg (183 lb)

Playing career^{1}
Years	Club	Games (Goals)
2012–2017	North Melbourne	130 (51)
2018	Adelaide	5 (2)
Total		135 (53)
- ^{1} Playing statistics correct to the end of 2018.

Sam Gibson (born 27 May 1986) is a former Australian rules footballer who played with the North Melbourne Football Club and the Adelaide Football Club in the Australian Football League (AFL). He was recruited by North Melbourne in the 2012 rookie draft, with pick 63. Gibson made his debut in round 12, 2012, against Gold Coast at Carrara Stadium.

At the end of the 2012 season Gibson signed a two-year deal with North Melbourne Football Club and was promoted to the senior list. He was told the 6th of October 2017 that his contract would not be renewed.

In his 135-game career, he has had only had 3 matches with less than 10 disposals, all three coming when he started as the sub.

In Round 16, 2016 Gibson played his 100th consecutive game from debut, the eighth player to do so. Gibson never missed a game for North Melbourne eventually going on to play 130 games from debut to when he was delisted.

Gibson was second at North for disposals and led the side in kicks, marks and uncontested disposals. He also increased his numbers from 2013 in disposals (21.6 to 24.6), tackles (2 to 3.5), rebound 50's (1.3 to 2.9), inside 50's (2.6 to 2.8) and clearances (1.7 to 2.1).

At the conclusion of the 2017 season, Gibson was delisted by North Melbourne Football Club.

In October 2017, Gibson was traded to Adelaide. He was named to play in round 1 the following season for Adelaide, but was a late withdrawal from the final side as a result of hamstring tightness sustained during the Crows' final training session pre-match. This brought to an end his streak of 130 consecutive games played without missing due to injury or suspension. At the time this was the league's longest such streak as well as the league record second most consecutive games since debut.

Gibson has a commerce/engineering degree, and worked as a civil engineer prior to joining North Melbourne.

Gibson announced his retirement from AFL football in August 2018.
