= Myles Poholke =

Australian rules footballer

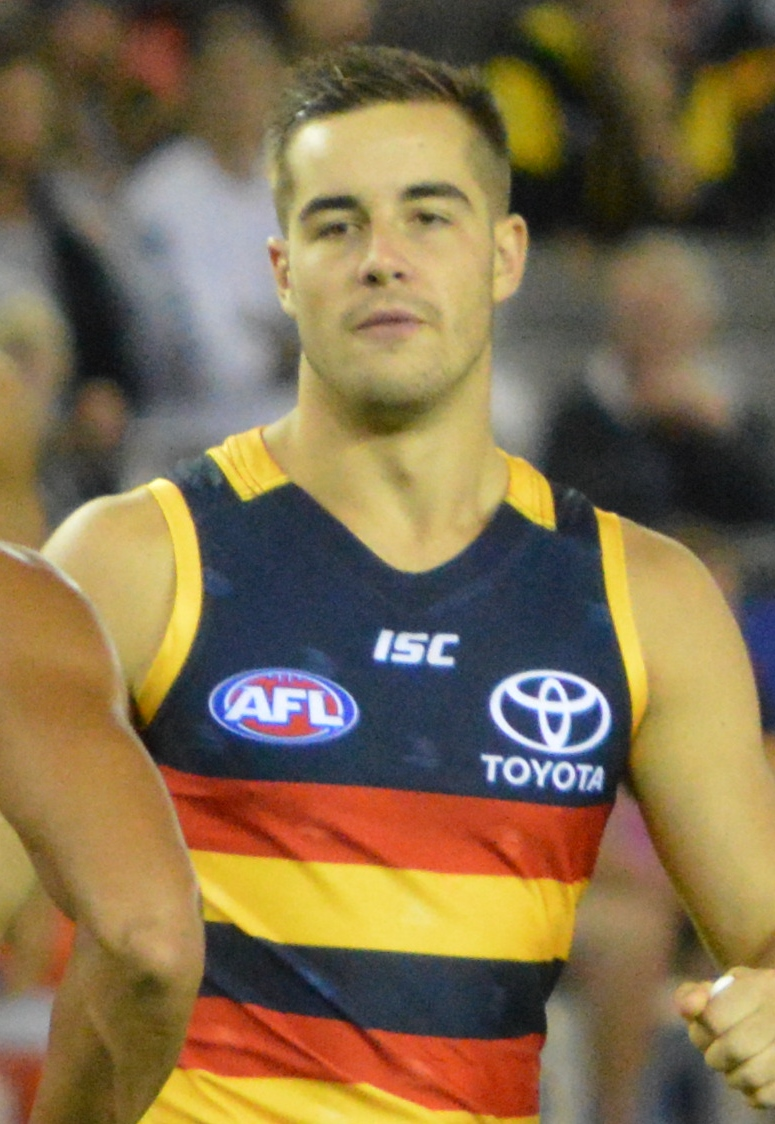
- Poholke playing for Adelaide in February 2017

Personal information
- Full name: Myles Poholke
- Born: 10 July 1998 (age 28)
- Original team: Dandenong Stingrays (TAC Cup)
- Draft: No. 44, 2016 national draft
- Debut: Round 5, 2018, Adelaide vs. Sydney, at SCG
- Height: 186 cm (6 ft 1 in)
- Weight: 86 kg (190 lb)
- Position: Forward

Playing career^{1}
Years	Club	Games (Goals)
2017–2020	Adelaide	16 (5)
- ^{1} Playing statistics correct to the end of 2020.

Myles Poholke (born 10 July 1998) is a former professional Australian rules footballer last playing for the Adelaide Football Club in the Australian Football League (AFL). He was drafted by Adelaide with their second selection and 44th overall in the 2016 national draft. He made his debut in the 10-point victory against Sydney at the Sydney Cricket Ground (SCG) in round five of the 2018 season.

== Statistics ==
Statistics are correct to the end of 2020

Legend
G	Goals	K	Kicks	D	Disposals	T	Tackles
B	Behinds	H	Handballs	M	Marks

Season	Team	No.	Games	Totals							Averages (per game)						
Season	Team	No.	Games	G	B	K	H	D	M	T	G	B	K	H	D	M	T
2017	Adelaide	31	0	—	—	—	—	—	—	—	—	—	—	—	—	—	—
2018	Adelaide	10	9	3	4	57	35	92	38	18	0.3	0.4	6.3	3.9	10.2	4.2	2.0
2019	Adelaide	10	2	0	1	10	15	25	7	5	0.0	0.5	5.0	7.5	12.5	3.5	2.5
2020	Adelaide	10	5	2	1	29	23	52	15	12	0.4	0.2	5.8	4.6	10.4	3.0	2.4
Career			16	5	6	96	73	169	60	35	0.3	0.4	6.0	4.6	10.6	3.8	2.2
