= Galluzzi =

Galluzzi is a surname most prevalent in the Italian regions Tuscany, Lombardy and Apulia. In Tuscany a toponymic origin of the name (Galluzzo south of Florence) is suggested.

Notable people with the surname include:

- Carlo Alberto Galluzzi (1919–2000), Italian politician
- Giuseppe Galluzzi (1903–1973), Italian footballer
- Lorenzo Galluzzi (born 1980), Italian and French cell biologist
- Maria Domitilla Galluzzi (1595–1671), Catholic mystic
- Miguel Angel Galluzzi (born 1959), Argentine industrial designer
- Paolo Galluzzi (born 1942), Italian historian of science
