= Paul Seedsman =

Australian rules footballer (born 1992)

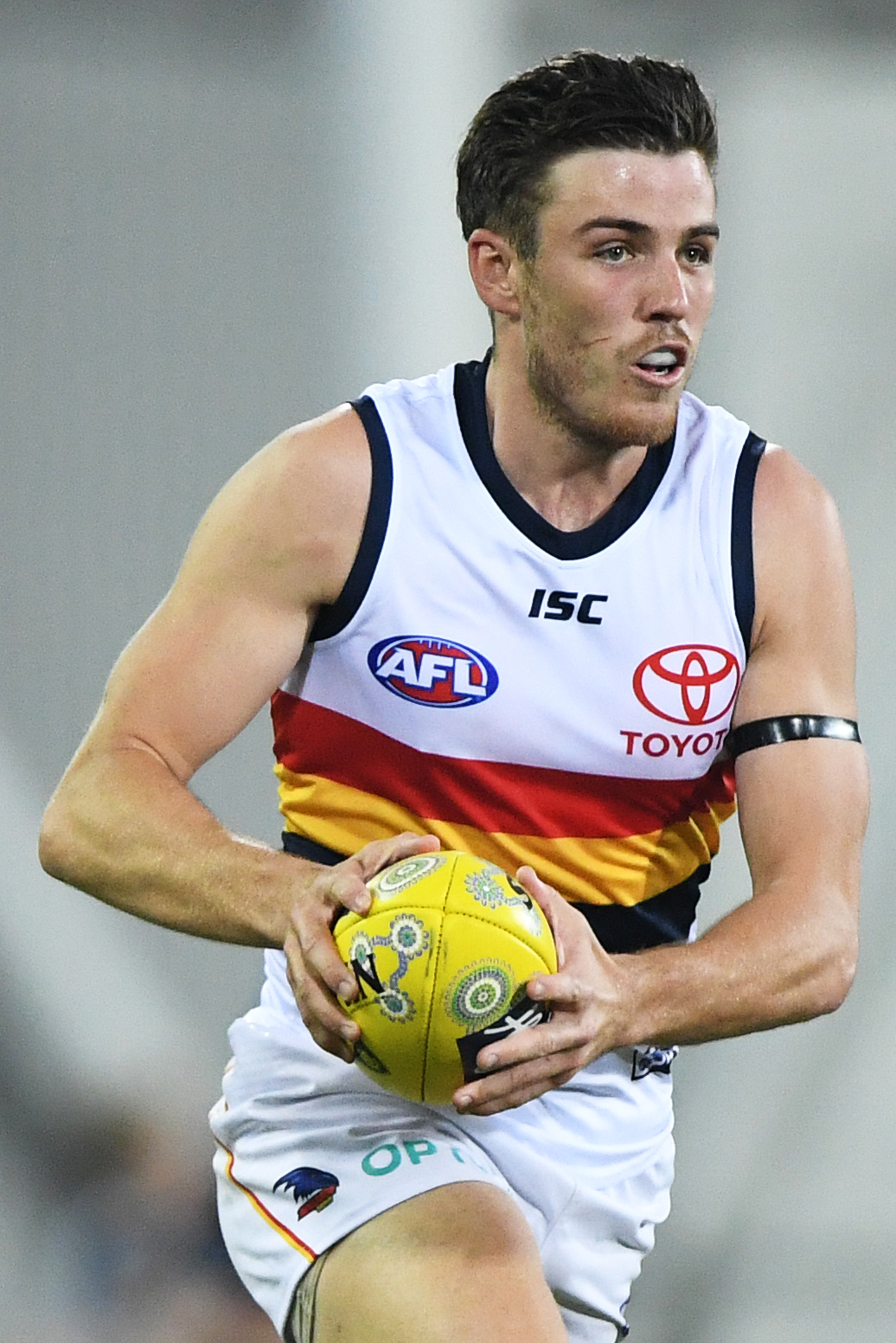
- Seedsman in June 2019

Personal information
- Full name: Paul Robert Seedsman
- Born: 22 January 1992 (age 34)
- Original team: Eastern Ranges (TAC Cup)/Rowville Football Club
- Draft: No. 76, 2010 national draft
- Debut: Round 1, 2012, Collingwood vs. Hawthorn, at MCG
- Height: 190 cm (6 ft 3 in)
- Weight: 84 kg (185 lb)
- Position: Midfielder

Playing career^{1}
Years	Club	Games (Goals)
2011–2015	Collingwood	49 (17)
2016–2023	Adelaide	83 (49)
Total		132 (66)
- ^{1} Playing statistics correct to the end of 2023.

Career highlights
- AFL Anzac Medal 2015

Paul Robert Seedsman (born 22 January 1992) is a former professional Australian rules footballer who played for the Adelaide Football Club in the Australian Football League (AFL). He was recruited by Collingwood in the 2010 national draft, with pick 76, and traded to Adelaide at the end of the 2015 season. Seedsman grew up supporting Collingwood; his great-grandfather, Jim Sharp, played for Fitzroy and Collingwood, and was president of Collingwood for 12 years.

== Pre-AFL career ==
Seedsman attended Heany Park Primary School and Caulfield Grammar School in Melbourne and played junior football for the Rowville Football Club.

== AFL career ==
=== Collingwood (2011–2015) ===
After playing out 2011 in Collingwood's VFL side, averaging 17 disposals, Seedsman made his debut in round 1 of the 2012 season, against Hawthorn. He established himself in the team in 2013, playing 17 matches and averaging 18.9 disposals as a rebounding defender capable of pushing onto the wing and forward. During the same season, he was also at the heart of a fallout between teammate Harry O'Brien and coach Nathan Buckley, with O'Brien reportedly taking issue with his teammates and Buckley calling Seedsman 'Lez' (a reference to his hairstyle at the time).

Seedsman injured his hip during the 2014 pre-season, requiring surgery. He returned to the side mid-season, before succumbing to an adductor injury ahead of Collingwood's round 19 match against Port Adelaide.

In October 2015, after playing 12 games for the season but only two after round 12, Seedsman requested a trade to Adelaide. He was officially traded to Adelaide on 19 October, having played 49 games for Collingwood.

=== Adelaide (2016–2023) ===
At the Crows, Seedsman was able to complete his first full pre-season of training for the first time in three years. He played in all three games for Adelaide in the 2016 NAB Challenge, impressing in the third and final match against Gold Coast in which he collected 23 disposals and kicked a goal. Seedsman played his first game for Adelaide, and 50th overall, against North Melbourne in round 1. After a good start, Seedsman injured himself in a tackle in the final quarter of the round 3 match against Richmond, but was still able to play the next week. Later in the season, in a clash against Geelong, Seedsman had a relatively easy set shot to put the Crows in front. Though known as a reliable kick, he was unable to kick the goal and the Crows lost the match by 26 points after Geelong scored the next four goals. Teammate Daniel Talia stressed after the match that the miss wasn't responsible for their loss.

In the lead-up to the round 14 clash with North Melbourne, Seedsman injured his hamstring in training, sidelining him from the team for several weeks. When he recovered, rather than going straight back into the AFL side he played his first SANFL match with the reserves team against Sturt, in which he starred with 29 possessions and a game-high 10 clearances. He was brought back into the AFL side the next week to face off against his former side Collingwood for the first time. Late in the season Seedsman had a corked buttock and was forced to miss several AFL games. Due to this injury Seedsman was given a special permit to play in the Crows’ first ever SANFL final in spite of not playing enough SANFL matches throughout the season to qualify. He ended up being a late withdrawal for the elimination final, but was brought into the side to play in the semi-final against South Adelaide.

In 2017, Seedsman's pre-season was interrupted by a groin injury. His recovery took longer than expected and meant he wasn't able to play any AFL at the beginning of the season. It wasn't until May that he was able to return to full training, then he started playing in the SANFL again in June. He played his first SANFL game for the season in a two-point win over Norwood.

After consistent from in the SANFL, Seedsman played his first AFL game for the season in round 19 against Collingwood. Though he wasn't able to keep his spot in the AFL side, he continued to impress in the SANFL, with an outstanding match against North Adelaide, getting a game-high 29 disposals and also kicking three goals. He was brought back into the AFL side for the final round match against West Coast, where he was good enough to keep his spot in the side going into the finals. When teammate Brodie Smith injured his ACL, Seedsman was seen as the most likely replacement given their similar playing styles and appearances, so he was more secure in his place in the side for the rest of the finals. Even though he'd only played four AFL matches for the season, and only two before the finals began, Seedsman was included in Adelaide's team for the 2017 AFL Grand Final in which they were defeated by 48 points by the Richmond Football Club.

Seedsman played all 22 games in 2021 for the Crows and it was his best season of his career. Averaging 26 disposals and five marks, Seedsman was able to showcase himself as one of the premier elite wingman in the AFL. Seedsman's career best season resulted in selection in the initial 40-man All Australian squad.

== Statistics ==
Statistics are correct to end of Round 23 2021

Legend
G	Goals	K	Kicks	D	Disposals	T	Tackles
B	Behinds	H	Handballs	M	Marks

Season	Team	No.	Games	Totals							Averages (per game)						
Season	Team	No.	Games	G	B	K	H	D	M	T	G	B	K	H	D	M	T
2012	Collingwood	40	11	2	3	72	59	131	38	25	0.2	0.3	6.5	5.4	11.9	3.5	2.3
2013	Collingwood	40	17	9	11	191	131	322	100	35	0.5	0.6	11.2	7.7	18.9	5.9	2.1
2014	Collingwood	40	9	2	3	79	61	140	37	24	0.2	0.3	8.8	6.8	15.6	4.1	2.7
2015	Collingwood	40	12	4	3	125	77	202	41	26	0.3	0.3	10.4	6.4	16.8	3.4	2.2
2016	Adelaide	11	15	9	5	151	104	255	65	60	0.6	0.3	10.1	6.9	17.0	4.3	4.0
2017	Adelaide	11	5	5	4	51	36	87	22	18	1.0	0.8	10.2	7.2	14.4	4.4	3.6
2018	Adelaide	11	19	13	13	233	157	390	77	49	0.6	0.6	12.2	8.2	20.5	4.0	2.5
2019	Adelaide	11	13	6	4	139	109	248	54	28	0.4	0.3	10.6	8.3	19.0	4.1	2.1
2020	Adelaide	11	9	4	5	79	65	144	24	28	0.4	0.5	8.7	7.2	16.0	2.6	3.1
2021	Adelaide	11	22	12	13	347	227	574	118	51	0.5	0.5	15.7	10.3	26.0	5.3	2.3
Career			132	66	64	1467	1026	2493	576	344	0.5	0.4	11.1	7.7	18.8	4.3	2.6

== See also ==
- List of Caulfield Grammar School people
