= Kyle Hartigan =

Australian rules footballer (born 1991)

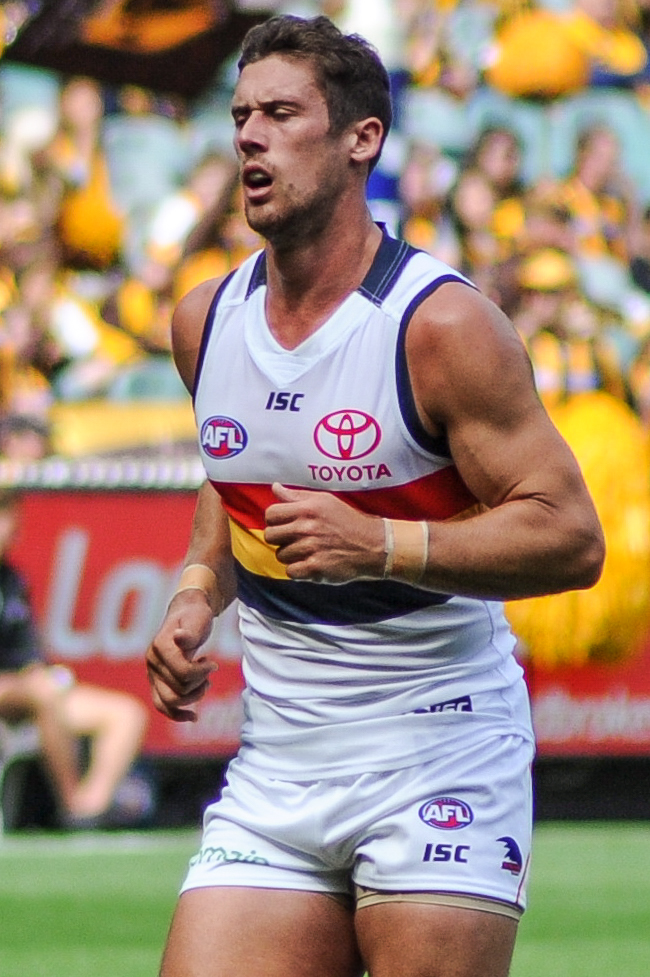
- Hartigan playing for Adelaide in April 2017

Personal information
- Full name: Kyle Hartigan
- Nickname: The Cartigan
- Born: 7 November 1991 (age 34)
- Original teams: Keilor (EDFL); Werribee (VFL)
- Draft: No. 14, 2012 rookie draft
- Debut: Round 18, 2013, Adelaide vs. Fremantle, at Patersons Stadium
- Height: 194 cm (6 ft 4 in)
- Weight: 96 kg (212 lb)
- Position: Key defender

Playing career^{1}
Years	Club	Games (Goals)
2013–2020	Adelaide	113 (1)
2021–2022	Hawthorn	22 (0)
Total		135 (1)
- ^{1} Playing statistics correct to the end of the 2022 season.

Kyle Hartigan (born 7 November 1991) is a former professional Australian rules football player who last played for the Hawthorn Football Club in the Australian Football League (AFL), having previously played for Adelaide. Hartigan was selected with the Crows' first pick, number 14 overall, in the 2012 Rookie Draft.

== Pre-AFL career ==
Overlooked in the 2009 national and rookie drafts as an 18-year-old, Hartigan was the subject of a tug-of-war between VFL teams Werribee and Williamstown; zoned to Williamstown, Hartigan wished to play for Werribee instead, to improve his chances of playing senior football and catching the eye of AFL recruiters looking for a mature prospect. Eventually the deal was done and Hartigan started playing for Werribee. He was invited to train with North Melbourne in the lead-up to the 2010 rookie draft, but was again overlooked. Finally, after three years playing for Werribee, Hartigan was drafted by Adelaide in the 2012 rookie draft.

== AFL career ==
Strong performances for SANFL club South Adelaide saw Hartigan promoted to the Crows senior list during his first season, as cover for injured defender Brent Reilly. Hartigan subsequently made his AFL debut against Fremantle in round 18, and went on to play three matches as a key defender, looking comfortable at AFL level. He played seven matches in 2014 before being dropped, and was in good form in the SANFL before suffering serious internal injuries in a collision with teammate Ben Rutten, which ruled him out for the rest of the season.

In 2015, Hartigan established himself in Adelaide's young backline with 18 matches, during which he stood some of the most dangerous key forwards in the AFL. At the end of the season he signed a two-year deal with Adelaide.

Following the conclusion of the 2016 season, Hartigan has been linked to Carlton Football Club as part of the Bryce Gibbs trade. Despite denials from Adelaide and his management, images emerged on social media of Hartigan meeting with Steven Trigg and his manager in South Yarra on 17 October 2016.

At the end of the 2016 season Hartigan was the only player on the Crows’ list not contracted beyond the 2017 season, but during the season he signed a new three-year deal. In a Showdown in Round 3, Hartigan surprisingly tagged Robbie Gray, who is both significantly shorter and significantly lighter than Hartigan. In spite of the apparent mismatch, Hartigan kept Gray to just two goals, less than the six goals that Gray had kicked the week before against Fremantle.

In the second half of the season Hartigan suffered from injury problems, keeping him out of the side for over a month. He initially injured his hamstring in a match against Carlton at the MCG on 1 July, which was expected to keep him sidelined for six weeks, but he was able to return through the SANFL within a month. On 30 July he played a game for Adelaide’s reserves team in Bordertown, and again injured his hamstring. Though it looked like his chances of recovering in time for the finals were slim, he returned to star in a 36-point win over Greater Western Sydney in the first week of the finals. He went on to play in the 2017 AFL Grand Final, which the Crows lost to premiers Richmond by 48 points.

On November 5, 2020, Hartigan was traded to Hawthorn during the AFL 2020 trade period in exchange for a future fourth-round pick.

Following the end of the 2022 season, Hartigan was delisted by Hawthorn.

== Post AFL Career ==
After his delisting, Hartigan would take a year off before entering player management, while also becoming an assistant coach with Werribee Football Club whom he spent three seasons with before his AFL career started. He coached the backline in their 2024 premiership season and would continue in the same role for 2025 after being appointed as the full time Football Manager, however has since stepped away from coaching duties to focus fully on the full time role for season 2026 and beyond.

== Statistics ==
Updated to the end of the 2022 season.

Legend
G	Goals	K	Kicks	D	Disposals	T	Tackles
B	Behinds	H	Handballs	M	Marks

Season	Team	No.	Games	Totals							Averages (per game)							Votes
Season	Team	No.	Games	G	B	K	H	D	M	T	G	B	K	H	D	M	T	Votes
2013	Adelaide	41	3	0	0	27	29	56	22	2	0.0	0.0	9.0	9.7	18.7	7.3	0.7	0
2014	Adelaide	41	7	0	0	56	50	106	41	9	0.0	0.0	8.0	7.1	15.1	5.9	1.3	0
2015	Adelaide	15	18	0	0	92	87	179	66	19	0.0	0.0	5.1	4.8	9.9	3.7	1.1	0
2016	Adelaide	15	23	1	0	172	128	300	116	39	0.0	0.0	7.5	5.6	13.0	5.0	1.7	0
2017	Adelaide	15	18	0	0	128	85	213	78	30	0.0	0.0	7.1	4.7	11.8	4.3	1.7	0
2018	Adelaide	15	13	0	0	96	53	149	69	14	0.0	0.0	7.4	4.1	11.5	5.3	1.1	0
2019	Adelaide	15	19	0	0	119	76	195	79	18	0.0	0.0	6.3	4.0	10.3	4.1	1.0	0
2020 (Note: The 2020 season was played with 17 home-and-away matches per team (down from 22) and 16-minute quarters with time on (down from 20-minute quarters with time on) due to the impact of the COVID-19 pandemic.)	Adelaide	15	12	0	0	68	43	111	37	18	0.0	0.0	5.7	3.6	9.3	3.1	1.5	0
2021	Hawthorn	28	19	0	0	106	95	201	66	16	0.0	0.0	5.6	5.0	10.6	3.5	0.8	0
2022	Hawthorn	28	3	0	0	8	5	13	5	2	0.0	0.0	2.7	1.7	4.3	1.7	0.7	0
Career			135	1	0	872	652	1524	579	167	0.0	0.0	6.5	4.8	11.3	4.3	1.2	0

== Honours and achievements ==
Team

- Minor premiership (Adelaide): 2017
