= Curtly Hampton =

Australian rules footballer

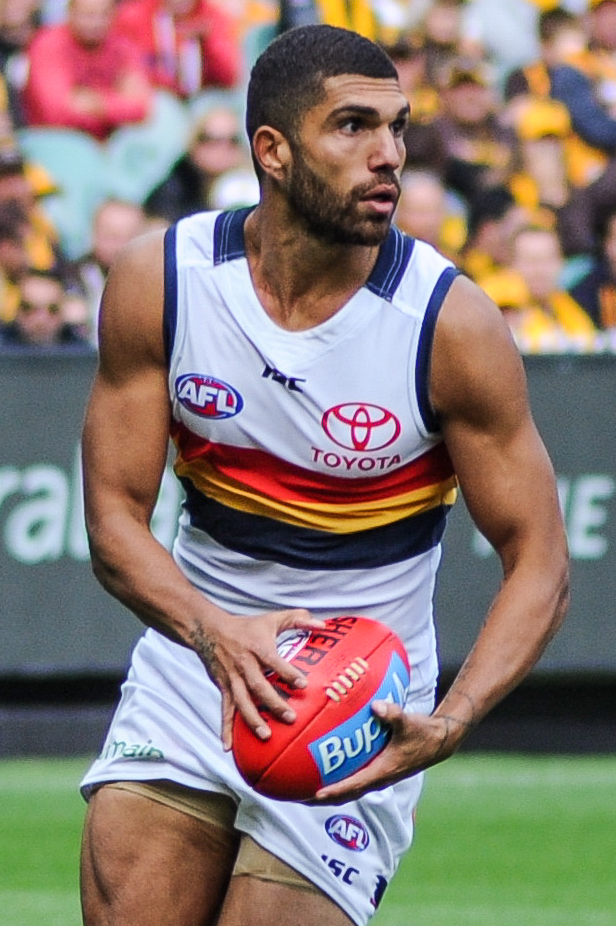
- Hampton playing for Adelaide in April 2017

Personal information
- Full name: Curtly Hampton
- Nicknames: Curt, Choc, Drizzy
- Born: 10 March 1993 (age 33)
- Original teams: Pioneers (CAFL); NT Thunder (NEAFL)
- Draft: 2010 Northern Territory zone selection, Greater Western Sydney
- Debut: Round 1, 2012, Greater Western Sydney vs. Sydney, at ANZ Stadium
- Height: 187 cm (6 ft 2 in)
- Weight: 91 kg (201 lb)
- Position: Small defender

Playing career^{1}
Years	Club	Games (Goals)
2012–2015	Greater Western Sydney	51 (10)
2016–2018	Adelaide	9 (2)
Total		60 (12)
- ^{1} Playing statistics correct to the end of 2017.

Curtly Hampton (born 10 March 1993) is a former professional Australian rules footballer who played for the Adelaide Football Club in the Australian Football League (AFL). He was originally recruited by incoming AFL club Greater Western Sydney with one of their Northern Territory zone selections in 2010. He was traded to Adelaide at the end of 2015, after 51 matches in four AFL seasons for Greater Western Sydney. Hampton is originally from Alice Springs, and is the son of former politician Karl Hampton.

== AFL career ==
=== Greater Western Sydney (2012–2015) ===
Hampton was one of the first players to be recruited by the Giants, using one of their Northern Territory zone selections in 2010. He had captained the Australian Institute of Sport academy team and was likened to former Adelaide star Andrew McLeod. In February 2011, Hampton had the distinction of kicking Greater Western Sydney's first ever goal, in a match against an AFL Sydney under 21s side.

Hampton made his AFL debut in Greater Western Sydney's first AFL game, in round 1 of 2012 against Sydney at ANZ Stadium, and went on to play 17 matches in his first year, playing both in attack and in defence. Hampton established himself in 2013 as a running defender, a position he had never played prior to AFL level, playing 18 matches and considerably improving on his 2012 output.

Hampton started well in 2014, starring at half-back for the first seven rounds before injuries derailed the latter part of his season, including a shoulder injury that would keep him out for six weeks. He then played just five games in 2015, dominating in the NEAFL but failing to make an impact when called up to the AFL side. At the end of the season, Hampton decided to explore trade options and was ultimately traded to the Adelaide Football Club in exchange for a 2016 second-round draft pick.

=== Adelaide (2016–2018) ===
Hampton's new start at the Crows was delayed by a foot injury that ultimately sidelined him for the entire season. He made his debut for the Crows in Round 1, 2017 against his old side, the Giants. On 18 July 2018, Hampton announced he was retiring from professional football.

== Statistics ==
Statistics are correct to end of 2018 season.

Legend
G	Goals	K	Kicks	D	Disposals	T	Tackles
B	Behinds	H	Handballs	M	Marks

Season	Team	No.	Games	Totals							Averages (per game)						
Season	Team	No.	Games	G	B	K	H	D	M	T	G	B	K	H	D	M	T
2012	Greater Western Sydney	2	17	6	8	150	80	230	52	31	0.4	0.5	8.8	4.7	13.5	3.1	1.8
2013	Greater Western Sydney	2	18	3	3	164	117	281	72	58	0.2	0.2	9.1	6.5	15.6	4.0	3.2
2014	Greater Western Sydney	2	11	1	2	107	78	185	40	39	0.1	0.2	9.7	7.1	16.8	3.6	3.6
2015	Greater Western Sydney	2	5	0	0	35	23	58	15	14	0.0	0.0	7.0	4.6	11.6	3.0	2.8
2016	Adelaide	17	0	–	–	–	–	–	–	–	–	–	–	–	–	–	–
2017	Adelaide	17	9	2	2	63	66	129	20	51	0.2	0.2	7.0	7.3	14.3	2.2	5.7
2018	Adelaide	17	3	2	0	13	12	25	7	12	0.7	0.0	4.3	4.0	8.3	2.3	4.0
Career			63	14	15	532	376	908	206	205	0.2	0.2	8.4	6.0	14.4	3.3	3.3

== Honours and achievements ==
Team

- McClelland Trophy (Adelaide): 2017
