= Cam Ellis-Yolmen =

Australian rules footballer (born 1993)

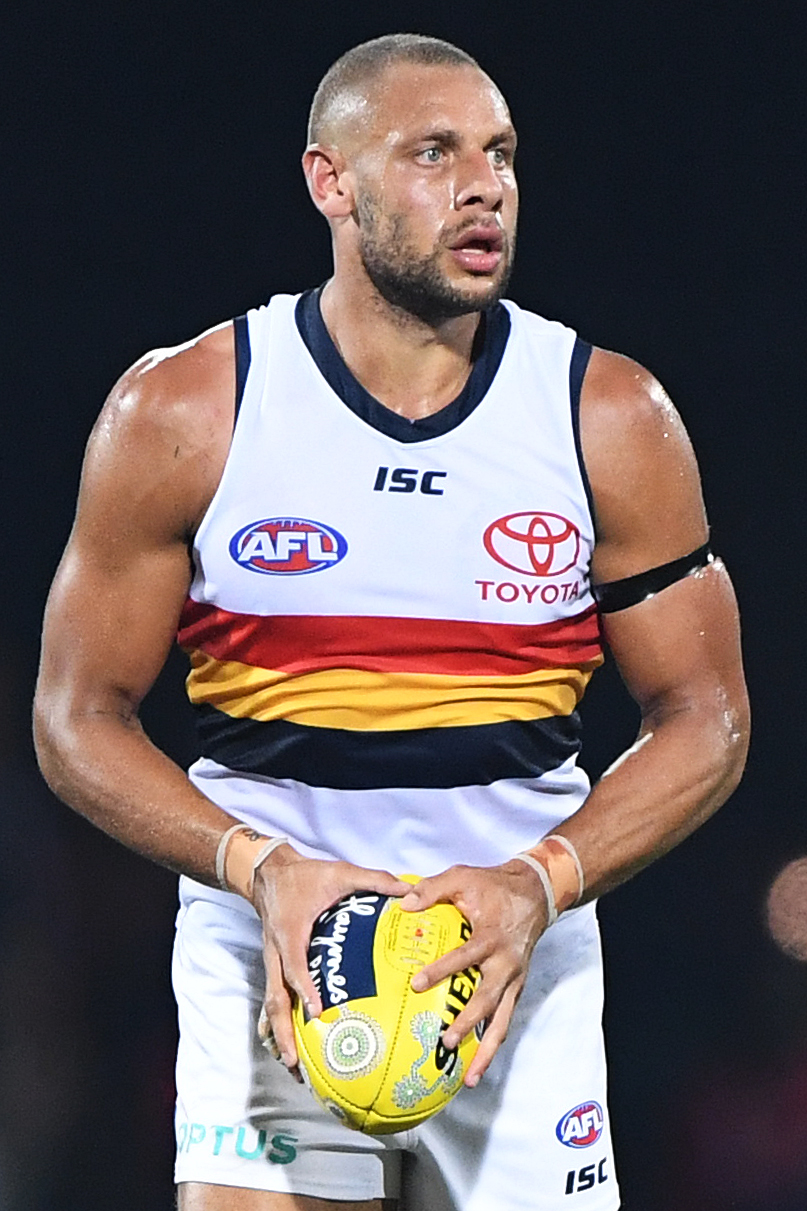
- Ellis-Yolmen in June 2019

Personal information
- Full name: Cameron Ellis-Yolmen
- Born: 28 January 1993 (age 33); Adelaide, Australia
- Original teams: Flinders Park (SAAFL); Woodville-West Torrens (SANFL)
- Draft: No. 64, 2011 national draft
- Debut: Round 12, 2014, Adelaide vs. Fremantle, at Patersons Stadium
- Height: 191 cm (6 ft 3 in)
- Weight: 105 kg (231 lb)
- Position: Midfielder

Playing career^{1}
Years	Club	Games (Goals)
2012–2019	Adelaide	39 (15)
2020–2022	Brisbane Lions	9 (3)
Total		48 (18)

International team honours^{2}
Years	Team	Games (Goals)
2013	Australia	2 (0)
- ^{1} Playing statistics correct to the end of 2022.^{2} Representative statistics correct as of 2013.

Cameron Ellis-Yolmen (born 28 January 1993) is a former professional Australian rules footballer, most recently playing for the Brisbane Lions in the Australian Football League (AFL), having played for the Adelaide Football Club from 2014 until 2019. He was drafted at pick 64 in the 2011 National Draft. Cam currently plays for the Surfers Paradise Demons in the QAFL.

== Early life ==
Ellis-Yolmen was born in Adelaide, New South Wales to mother Kylie an Indigenous Australian from Koonibba on the west coast of South Australia. and father Ellis-Yolmen's father of Papua New Guinea. He moved to Adelaide in South Australia when he was very young.

Ellis-Yolmen played his junior football with 80 games at the Lockleys Football Club before playing senior football with Flinders Park Football Club in the SAAFL and Woodville West Torrens Football Club in the SANFL where he was noticed by recruiters from AFL club Adelaide.

== AFL career ==
Ellis-Yolmen did not play an AFL match in his first two seasons, establishing himself in the senior side of Woodville-West Torrens in the SANFL. Despite having not yet played an AFL game, he was chosen in the Australian squad in the 2013 Indigenous International Rules series against Ireland. Whilst in Ireland, Ellis-Yolmen was the subject of controversy when he posted a photo of himself holding a rifle.

Ellis-Yolmen finally made his AFL debut in Round 12, 2014 against Fremantle, playing as the substitute and gathering only five disposals. He was dropped to the SANFL the following week and dislocated his finger against Central District, hindering his prospects of a recall. He did not play another AFL game in 2014, but impressed playing in the midfield in Adelaide's new reserves team, finishing fourth in the best and fairest and having the most disposals, clearances and tackles for the team.

Ellis-Yolmen started 2015 in Adelaide's best lineup, showing excellent form in averaging 20 disposals in the first five rounds. Afterwards his form tapered off and he was dropped after round 15.

He was delisted by Adelaide at the conclusion of the 2017 season but regained a place on their list for the 2018 season.

In the 2019 Trade period the Brisbane Lions signed Ellis-Yolmen as an unrestricted free agent with the Adelaide Crows receiving a third-round compensation pick.

In January 2022 Brisbane Lions moved Ellis-Yolmen to the Inactive List following his decision not to comply with the AFL's Covid vaccination requirements.

== Personal life ==
Ellis-Yolmen's father is from Papua New Guinea, and his mother is an Indigenous Australian from Koonibba on the west coast of South Australia. Cam currently resides in Wodonga, working in the renewable energy sector for Next Generation Energy.

== Statistics ==
Statistics are correct to end of Round 21 2020

Legend
G	Goals	K	Kicks	D	Disposals	T	Tackles
B	Behinds	H	Handballs	M	Marks

Season	Team	No.	Games	Totals							Averages (per game)						
Season	Team	No.	Games	G	B	K	H	D	M	T	G	B	K	H	D	M	T
2014	Adelaide	28	1	0	0	2	3	5	1	0	0.0	0.0	2.0	3.0	5.0	1.0	0.0
2015	Adelaide	28	11	3	5	91	85	176	23	53	0.3	0.5	8.3	7.7	16.0	2.1	4.8
2016	Adelaide	28	2	4	3	14	17	31	7	9	2.0	1.5	7.0	8.5	15.5	3.5	4.5
2018	Adelaide	28	15	6	3	134	168	302	46	82	0.4	0.2	8.9	11.2	20.1	3.1	5.5
2019	Adelaide	28	10	2	2	100	135	235	29	56	0.2	0.2	10.0	13.5	23.5	2.9	5.6
2020	Brisbane Lions	28	9	3	2	50	48	98	18	23	0.3	0.2	5.6	5.3	10.9	2.0	2.6
2021	Brisbane Lions	28	0	0	0	0	0	0	0	0	0.0	0.0	0.0	0.0	0.0	0.0	0.0
Career			48	18	15	391	456	847	124	221	0.3	0.3	8.1	9.5	17.6	2.5	4.6
