= Picola =

- Town
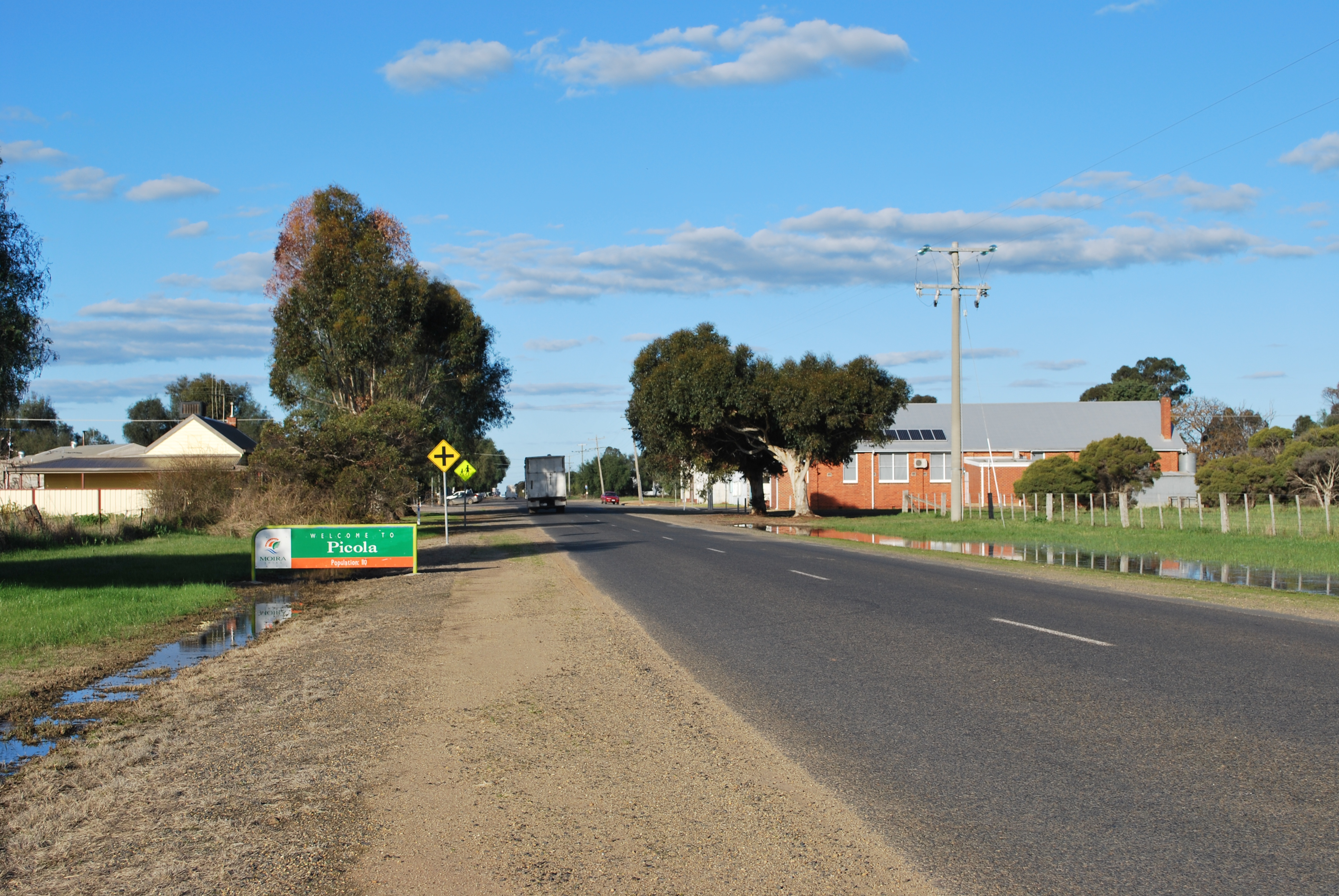
- Picola

- Coordinates: 36°00′0″S 145°08′0″E
- Country: Australia
- State: Victoria
- Region: Hume
- LGA: Shire of Moira
- Location: 246 km (153 mi) N of Melbourne; 56 km (35 mi) N of Shepparton; 50 km (31 mi) E of Echuca; 14 km (8.7 mi) N of Nathalia

Government
  - State electorate: Shepparton
  - Federal division: Nicholls

Population
  - Total: 334 (2011 census)
- Postcode: 3639
Localities around Picola
Barmah	New South Wales	New South Wales
Picola West	Picola	Yeilima
Lower Moira	Kotupna	Nathalia

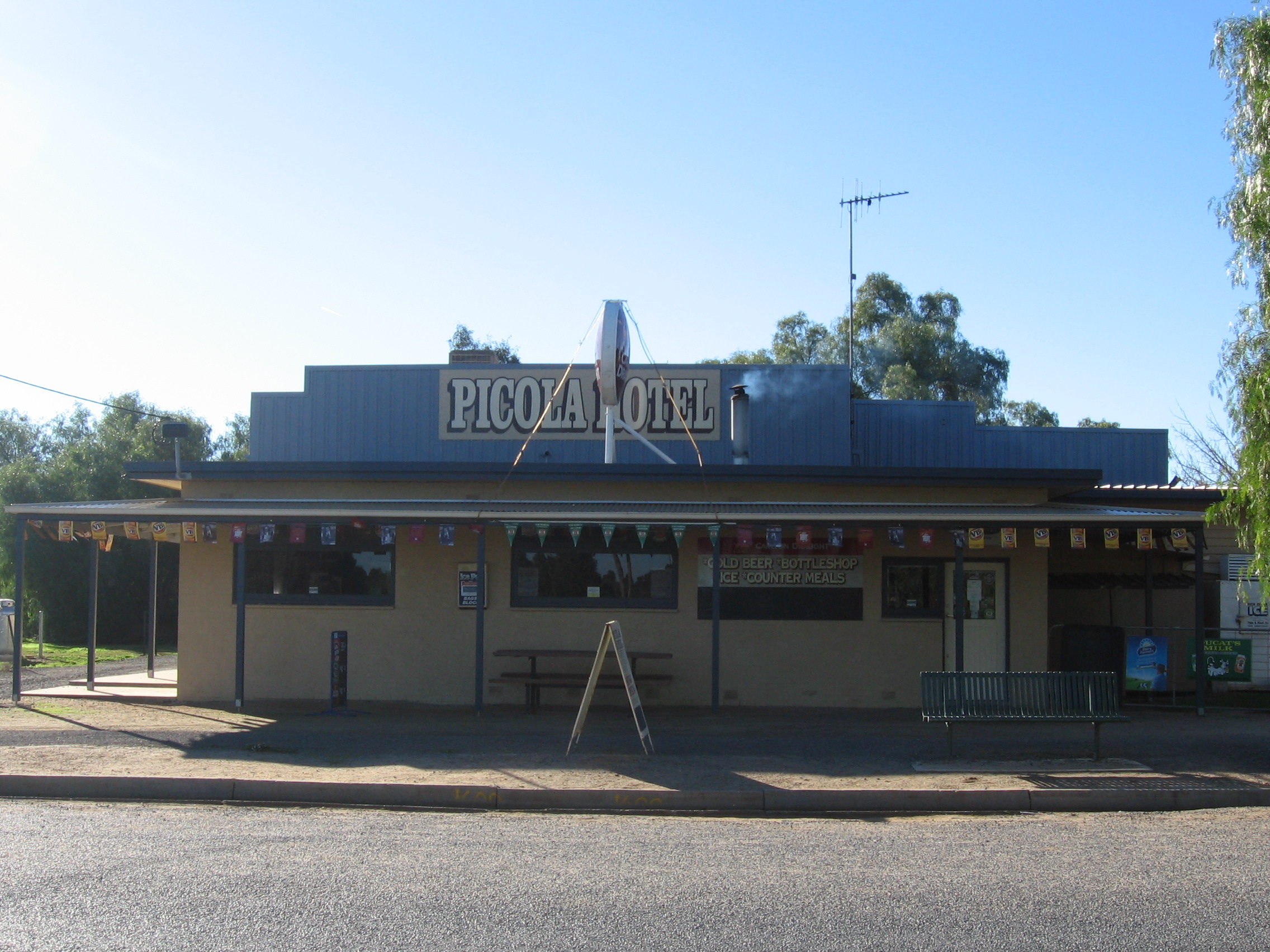
Picola Hotel in 2007

Picola is a town in the Shire of Moira in northern Victoria, Australia. At the 2021 census, Picola had a population of 206.

== History ==
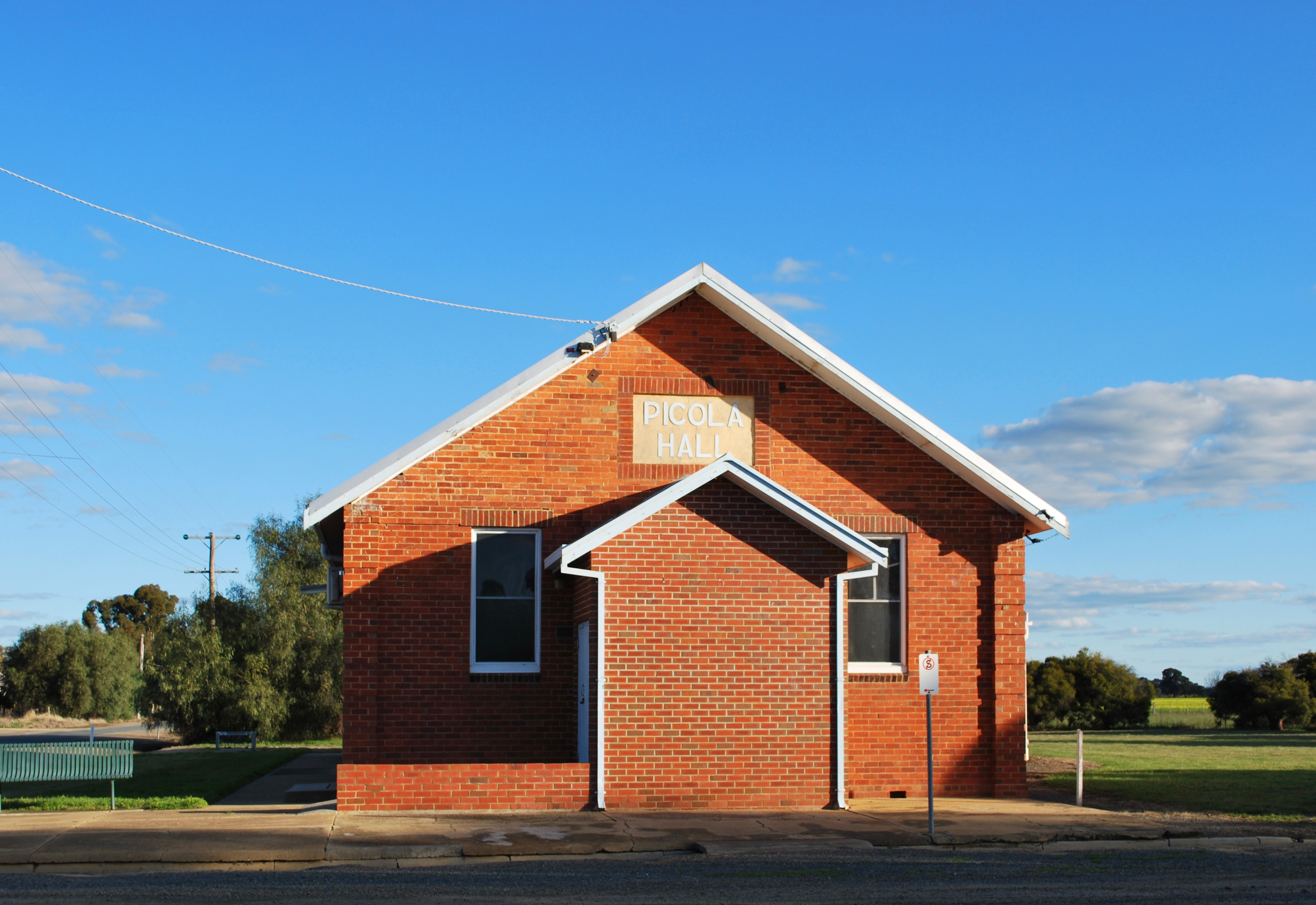
Picola Hall in 2011

The name Picola is thought to derive from an Aboriginal word for either rushing water or an Aboriginal sub-group. During the 1800s, the towns of Picola and Nathalia competed for farmland selection. Picola was close to the coach route from Echuca to Tocumwal and had a general store, a Union Church and a primary school which was established in 1879. However, Picola fell behind, likely due to its lack of a substantial watercourse compared to Nathalia's position on the Broken Creek.

Picola Post Office opened on 24 August 1878 and closed in late 2010. The Australia Post outlet was then taken over by the Picola Hotel, until early 2011.

On 15 December 1896, the railway line was extended from Nathalia to Picola. It closed on 8 December 1986. It was used to transport wheat, livestock and red gum from the Barmah National Park. The town was once known as 'the hook' because it was at the end of a railway line.

Federal Hall was established in 1900, later known as Picola Memorial Hall and Picola Public Hall. It has been burnt down and rebuilt twice: on 19 August 1936, leading the wooden building to be replaced by a brick structure, and on 12 April 1939. Water was carted from Broken Creek until a town dam and water tank was constructed in 1950. A book about the history of the hall was written by Jeanette Holland in 2010.

After the silo art project in Picola was completed in December 2020 as part of the Silo Art Trail, Picola has experienced a tourism boom, leading to owner Bruce Agnew refurbishing and reopening the Picola Hotel on 17 November 2021. Painted by Jimmy Dvate, it features flora and fauna from the Barmah National Park. There are plans to paint a second mural.

Picola has a mixture of irrigated, wheat and timber milling farms. At the 2011 census, farming accounted for 37.2% of employment, with 9.9% dairy farming.

== Arts and culture ==
Picola Public Hall hosts a monthly dance night featuring local bands and musicians, as well as themed dances during holidays.

== Transportation ==
Picola is serviced by two return V/Line coach services on weekdays originating in Barmah: both connect in Shepparton, with train services to Melbourne Southern Cross station. The Picola Hotel serves as the ticket agency.

== Sport ==
The town is home to Picola United Football Club competing in the Picola & District Football League, and the Picola Bowls Club, competing in the Murray Bowls Association.
