= Kotupna =

- Town
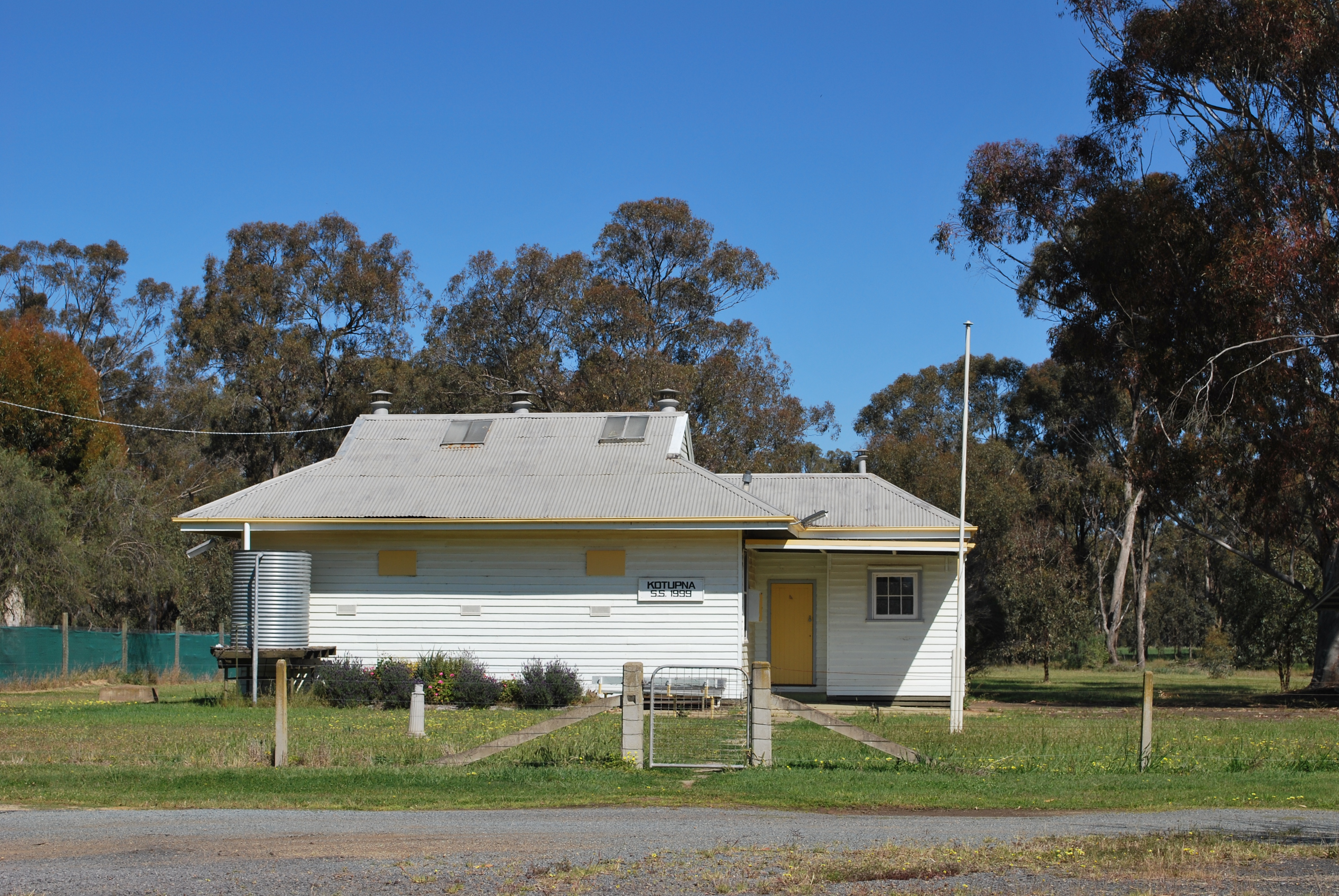
- Former state school at Kotupna

- Coordinates: 36°08′45″S 145°07′46″E
- Country: Australia
- State: Victoria
- Region: Hume
- LGA: Shire of Moira

Government
  - State electorate: Shepparton
  - Federal division: Nicholls

Population
  - Total: 105 (2016 census)
- Postcode: 3638
Localities around Kotupna
Lower Moira	Picola	Nathalia
Lower Moira	Kotupna	Kaarimba
Wyuna	St Germains	Undera

Kotupna is a locality in northern Victoria, Australia in the local government area of the Shire of Moira.

== History ==
In 1840, the Kotupna Run was an area of 118,000 acres near the Goulburn Weir, which then cut across the Broken Creek, with the south boundary on the bank of the Goulburn River. The Kotupna Run was between the Murray and Goulburn Rivers and was intersected by a number of creeks.

In a letter to The Argus newspaper, in August 1866, the owner of the Kotupna Run, Mr E Locke writes that - "When a very young man I held a large tract of country, called in the native language, Kotorpna (now wrongly spelled Kotupna), extending nearly across the angle formed by the Goulburn and Murray Rivers".

The post office opened on 17 October 1881, and closed on 30 June 1993.

As early as 1878, the Bridge Hotel, Kotupna was mentioned in an article about the Annual Hotel Licensing Meeting.

== Sport and recreation ==
The Kotupna Football Club was an Australian Rules football club and was established in 1896 and they played in the following competitions -

- 1897 - Murray River District Football Association
- 1898 - 1899: Nathalia & District Football Association
- 1900 - 1903: Barmah Central Football Association Kotupna were unbeaten premiers in 1903.
- 1904 - Nathalia & District Football Association
- 1905 - 1915: Western & Moira Ridings Football Association
- 1916 - 1918: In recess due to World War One
- 1919 - 1933?: Western & Moira Ridings Football Association
- 1934 - 1935: Picola & District Football League

The club won two Western & Moira Ridings Football Association premierships in 1911 and 1923 and were runner up in 1924.

Kotupna were also runner up in 1898 in the Nathalia & District Football Association.
