= Barmah =

- Town
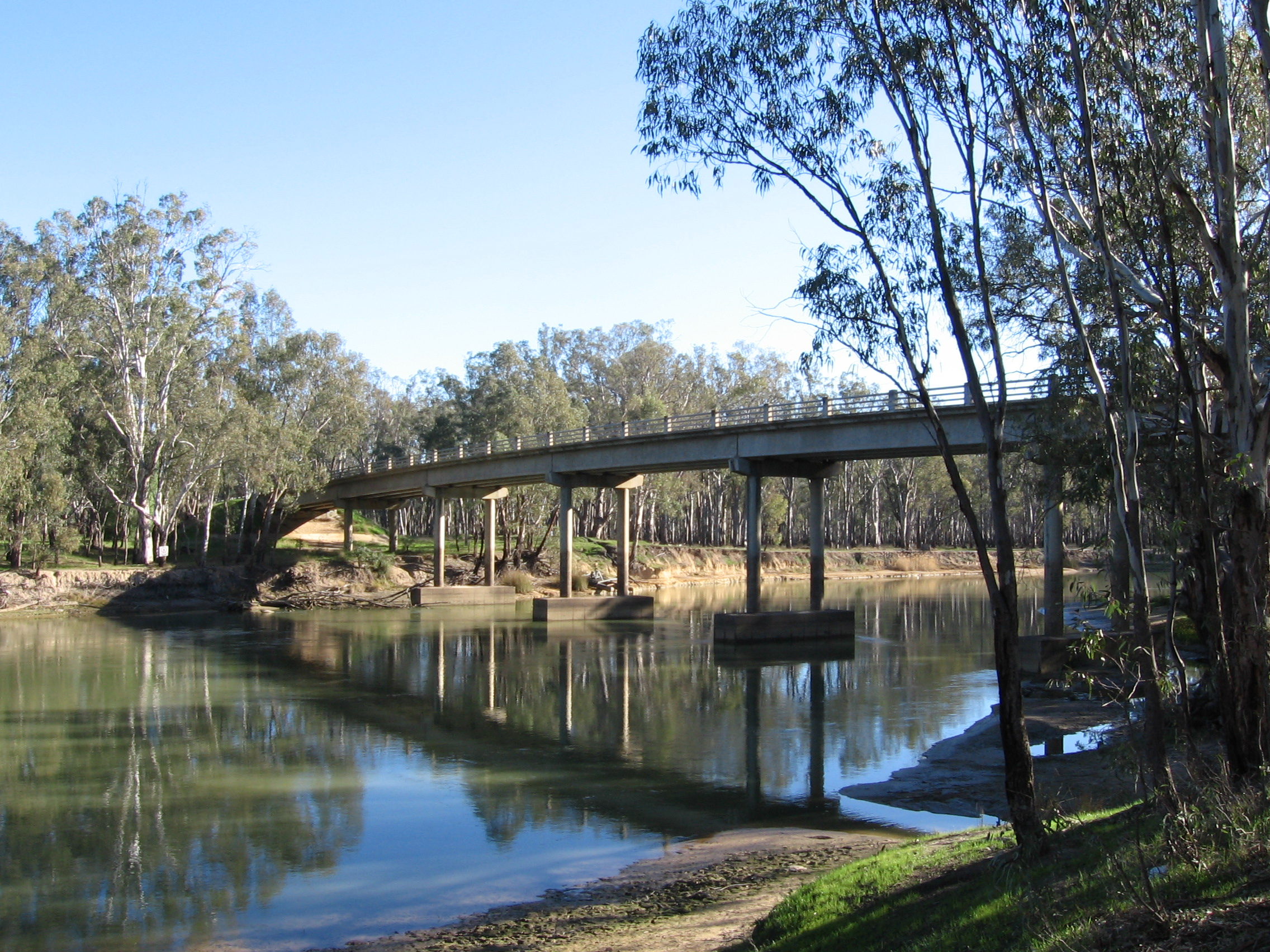
- Murray River crossing at Barmah

- Interactive map of Barmah
- Coordinates: 36°01′03″S 144°57′55″E
- Country: Australia
- State: Victoria
- Region: Hume
- LGA: Shire of Moira
- Location: 265 km (165 mi) N of Melbourne; 63 km (39 mi) NW of Shepparton; 34 km (21 mi) SW of Echuca; 27 km (17 mi) W of Nathalia; 16 km (9.9 mi) W of Picola

Government
  - State electorate: Shepparton
  - Federal division: Nicholls

Population
  - Total: 229 (2021 census)
- Postcode: 3639
Localities around Barmah
New South Wales	New South Wales	Picola
New South Wales	Barmah	Picola West
Lower Moira	Lower Moira	Picola

Barmah is a town in the state of Victoria, Australia.

Barmah has the distinction of being located north of the border with the state of New South Wales. New South Wales is north of Victoria, with the border being the westward-flowing Murray River. However, just downstream of Barmah the Murray winds to the south and east for a short distance before resuming its westward course. The land within this length of river results in a small part of New South Wales being to the south of the Victorian town.

Barmah is near the largest river red gum forest in the world. The Barmah National Park is on the floodplain of the Murray River, and when it floods is an important breeding ground for Murray cod. The flood is enhanced by the geological features of the riverbed, as the channel narrows at an area known as the Barmah choke.

The Barmah Forest is listed under the Ramsar Convention for wetlands and, with various state forests in New South Wales, has been identified as an Important Bird Area. It is rich in bird species and is the breeding ground for the superb parrot, a species listed as vulnerable on the IUCN Red List.

== History ==
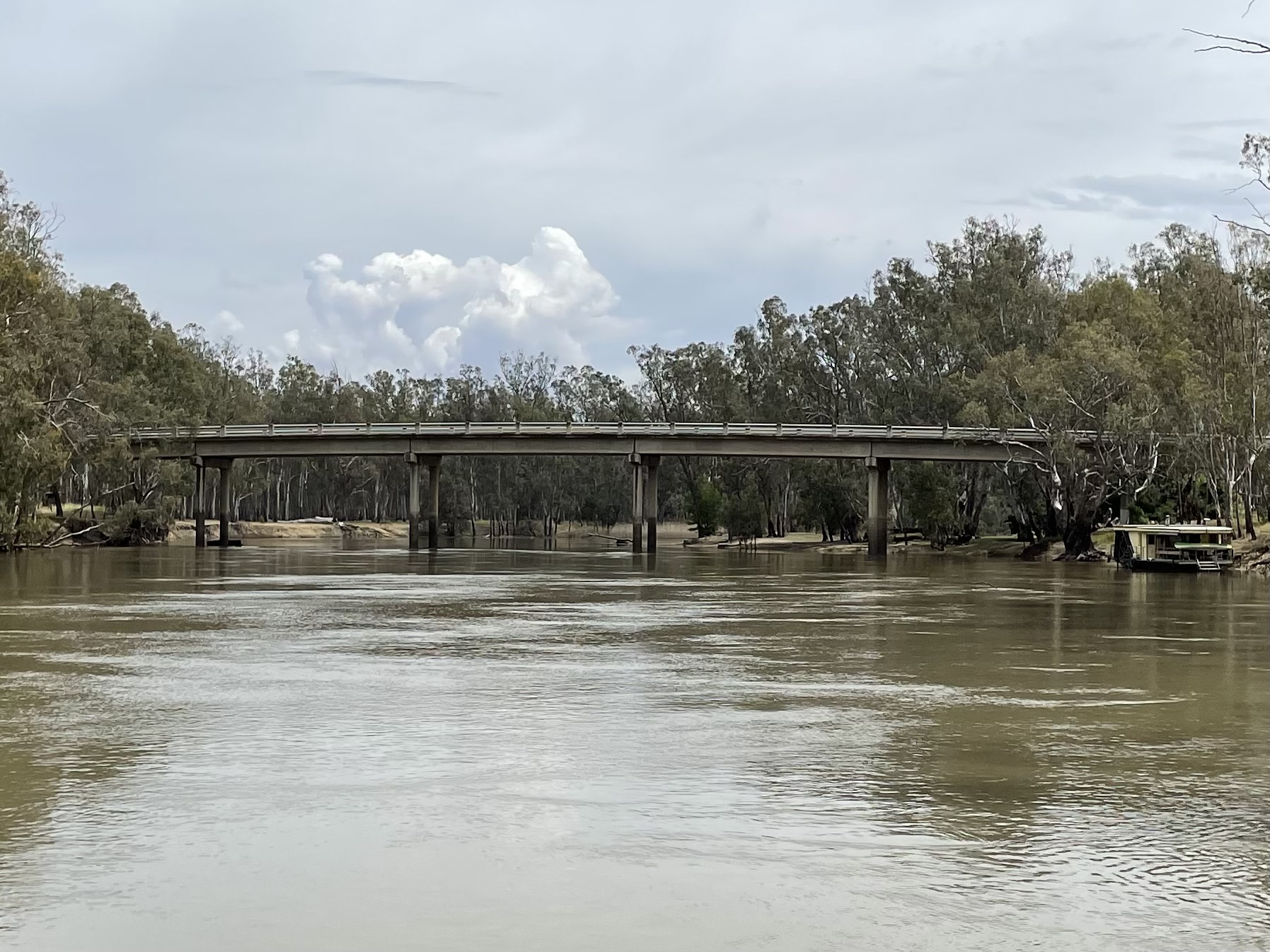
The Barmah Bridge, (from downstream) connecting NSW and VIC (2021)

The Barmah area was first settled in 1856 by Joseph Waldo Rice who established the Murray Fishing Company to supply fish for the gold mining region of Bendigo, Victoria. Barmah was, for a time beginning in the early 1880s, a prosperous centre, whose chief industry was sawmilling. There were two major sawmills; that of Robert Barbour on the N.S.W. side of the river, and James MacIntosh's and E. Whitely's on the Victorian side. Much of the timber was exported to India for piles and railway sleepers until a government prohibition of the export of redgum, which forced closure of the Barmah mills. Trade picked up later, with the expansion of the railway network and a new sawmill was opened by R. Evans, who shipped the sawn timber to Echuca on his steamboat, the Edwards.

A Barmah Post Office opened on 16 September 1876 and was renamed Barmah East in 1907, closing in 1951. Barmah Township Post Office opened on 2 May 1902. One virus peculiar to Barmah is the Barmah forest virus infection which is transmitted from animals to humans by mosquito bite. A way to avoid this virus is to protect yourself from mosquitoes bite in Barmah.

== Population ==
At the 2021 census, Barmah had a population of 229. 87.8% of people were born in Australia and 90.8% of people only spoke English at home.

== Ancient geography ==
The geography at Barmah is explained by a geological event that occurred 25,000 years ago, when an uplift of land along the Cadell Fault forced the Murray River onto a new course for 500 km. The river had to force its way through the Barmah choke taking over the Goulburn River in the process. The uplifted land that led to these changes is noticeable as a continuous, low, earthen embankment along the road leading into Barmah from the west, which may appear to the untrained eye as man-made.

== See also ==
- Ulupna Island
