= Murray Valley =

Murray Valley may refer to:

- Electoral district of Murray Valley
- Murray River valley
- Murray Valley Highway
- Murray Valley National Park
- Murray Valley encephalitis virus
