= Swainsona adenophylla =

Scientific classification
- Kingdom: Plantae
- Clade: Tracheophytes
- Clade: Angiosperms
- Clade: Eudicots
- Clade: Rosids
- Order: Fabales
- Family: Fabaceae
- Subfamily: Faboideae
- Genus: Swainsona
- Species: S. adenophylla

Binomial name
- Swainsona adenophylla J.M.Black

Synonyms
- Swainsona microcalyx subsp. adenophylla (J.M.Black) A.T.Lee; Swainsona microcalyx var. adenophylla (J.M.Black) J.M.Black

Species of legume

Swainsona adenophylla, commonly known as violet swainson-pea or violet Darling pea, is a species of flowering plant in the family Fabaceae and is endemic to arid areas of central Australia. It is a slender, erect or spreading perennial herb with imparipinnate leaves with three to nine linear to narrowly egg-shaped leaflets, and racemes of pink or purplish flowers in racemes of ten to twenty.

== Description ==
Swainsona adenophylla is a slender, erect or spreading perennial herb, that typically grows to a height of up to 30 cm (12 in) with densely softly-hairy stems at the base. The leaves are imparipinnate, 30–50 mm (1.2–2.0 in) long with 3 to 9 linear to egg-shaped leaflets, the side leaflets 15–25 mm (0.59–0.98 in) long and mostly 0.5–2 mm (0.020–0.079 in) wide with stipules up to about 4 mm (0.16 in) long at the base of the petiole. The leaflets have a distinctive spherical, yellow gland at the tip. The flowers are pink or purplish, arranged in racemes of 10 to 20, each flower 6–9 mm (0.24–0.35 in) long. The sepals are softly-hairy and joined at the base, forming a tube with the lobes shorter than the sepal tube. The standard petal is 7–9 mm (0.28–0.35 in) long, 6–8 mm (0.24–0.31 in) wide, and the keel about 7 mm (0.28 in) long. Flowering usually occurs from June to September, and the fruit is a narrowly oblong pod 10–20 mm (0.39–0.79 in) long and 3–4 mm (0.12–0.16 in) wide.

== Taxonomy and naming ==
Swainsona adenophylla was first formally described in 1926 by John McConnell Black in the Transactions and prodeedings of the Royal Society of South Australia.

== Distribution and habitat ==
Violet swainson-pea grows on sandy or stony flats, especially near the edge of lakes, and is widespread in central South Australia. It is also known from single collections in Kinchega National Park in New South Wales, and from Barmah State Forest in Victoria.

== Conservation status ==
Swainsona adenophylla is listed as "endangered" in New South Wales under the Biodiversity Conservation Act 2016 and as "critically endangered" in Victoria under the Flora and Fauna Guarantee Act 1988.
