= Barmah-Millewa Important Bird Area =

Important Bird Area in New South Wales, Australia

Coordinates: 35°49′57″S 145°05′20″E

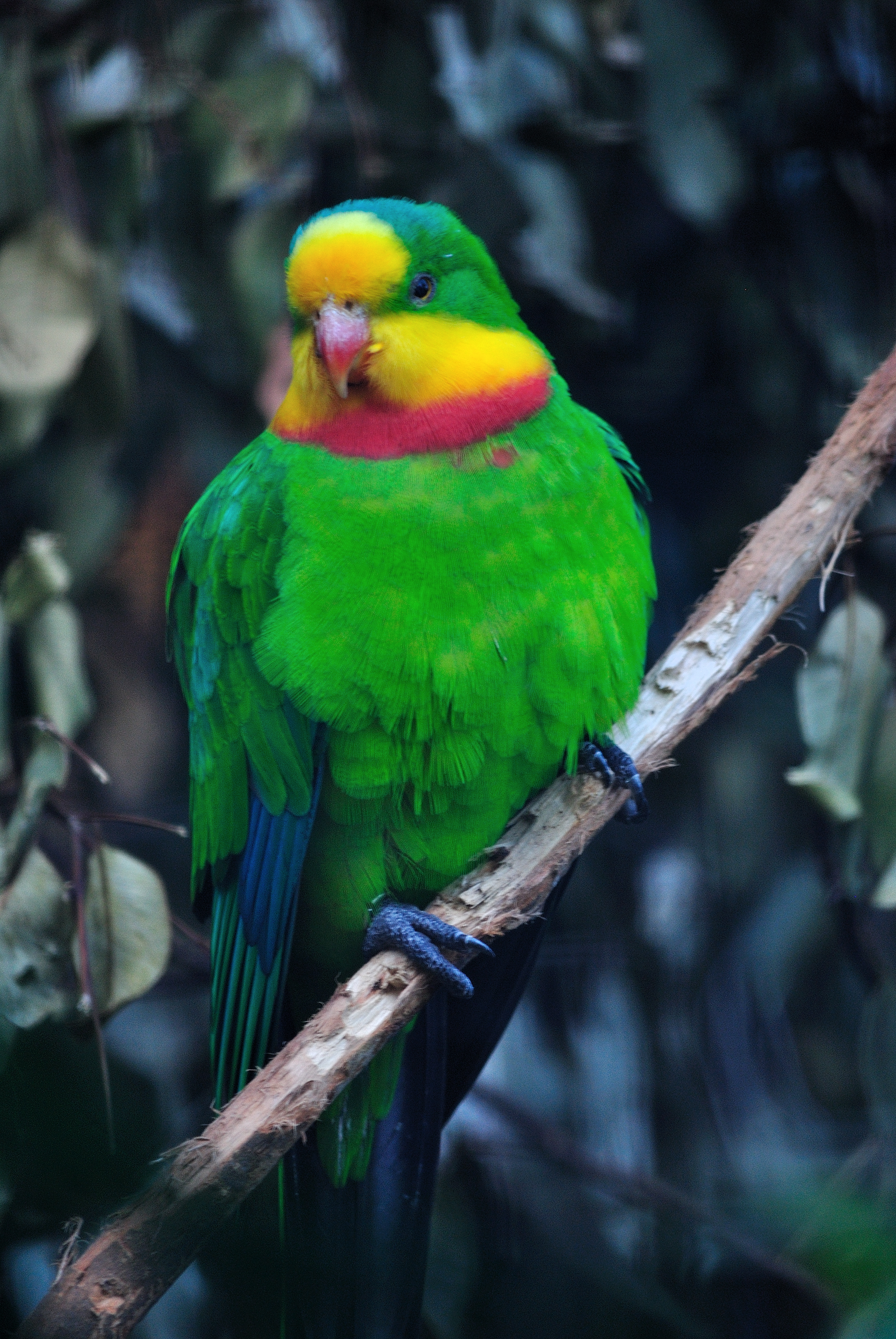
The IBA is an important site for superb parrots

The Barmah-Millewa Important Bird Area is a 2635 km^{2} tract of land in south-eastern Australia which has been identified by BirdLife International as an Important Bird Area (IBA) because of its significance for the conservation of a range of bird species.

== Description ==
The site straddles the upper Murray River and the border between the states of New South Wales and Victoria. It contains, and is largely defined by, Australia's largest remaining river red gum forest and includes the Barmah National Park in Victoria as well as several state forests in New South Wales. It includes agricultural land within 10 km foraging range of superb parrot forest breeding habitat.

== Birds ==
The site was identified as an IBA because it supports Australasian bitterns, superb parrots, flame robins and diamond firetails, as well as large numbers of breeding waterbirds when flooded.
