= Picola West =

- Town
- Coordinates: 35°57′16″S 145°03′24″E
- Country: Australia
- State: Victoria
- Region: Hume
- LGA: Shire of Moira

Government
  - State electorate: Shepparton
  - Federal division: Nicholls

Population
  - Total: 9 (2016 census)
- Postcode: 3639
Localities around Picola West
Barmah	Picola	Picola
Barmah	Picola West	Picola
Barmah	Picola	Picola

Picola West is a locality in northern Victoria, Australia in the local government area of the Shire of Moira.

The Post office opened on 15 March 1886, and closed on 30 June 1971.
