= Broken Creek =

River in Victoria, Australia

Coordinates: 36°5′21″S 145°27′18″E

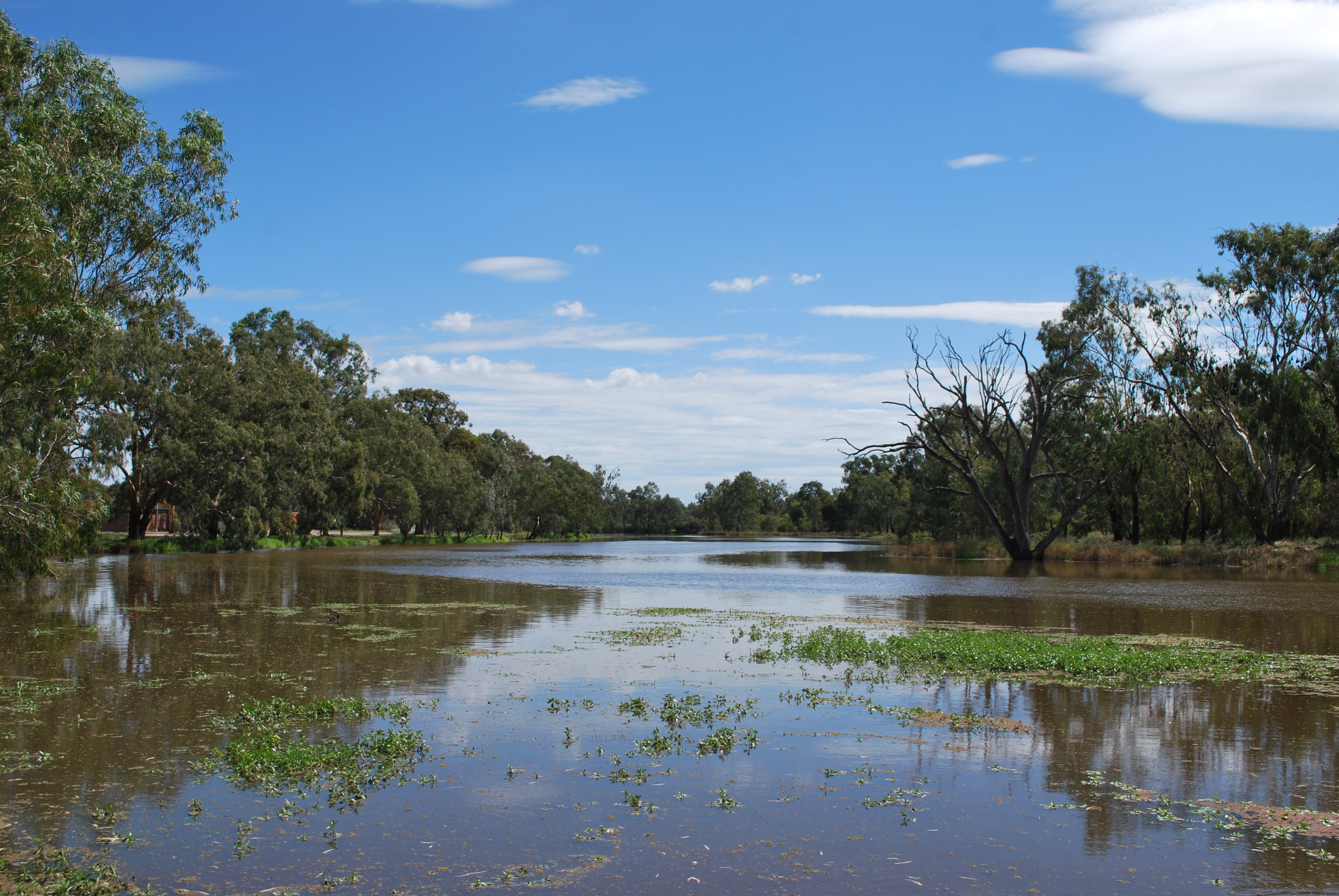
Broken Creek at Numurkah

Broken Creek is a creek in northern Victoria, Australia. The creek diverges from Broken River immediately downstream from the former Lake Mokoan (now decommissioned) near Benalla and flows in a north-west direction. The creek passes through the towns of Numurkah and Nathalia before entering the Murray River upstream from Barmah.
