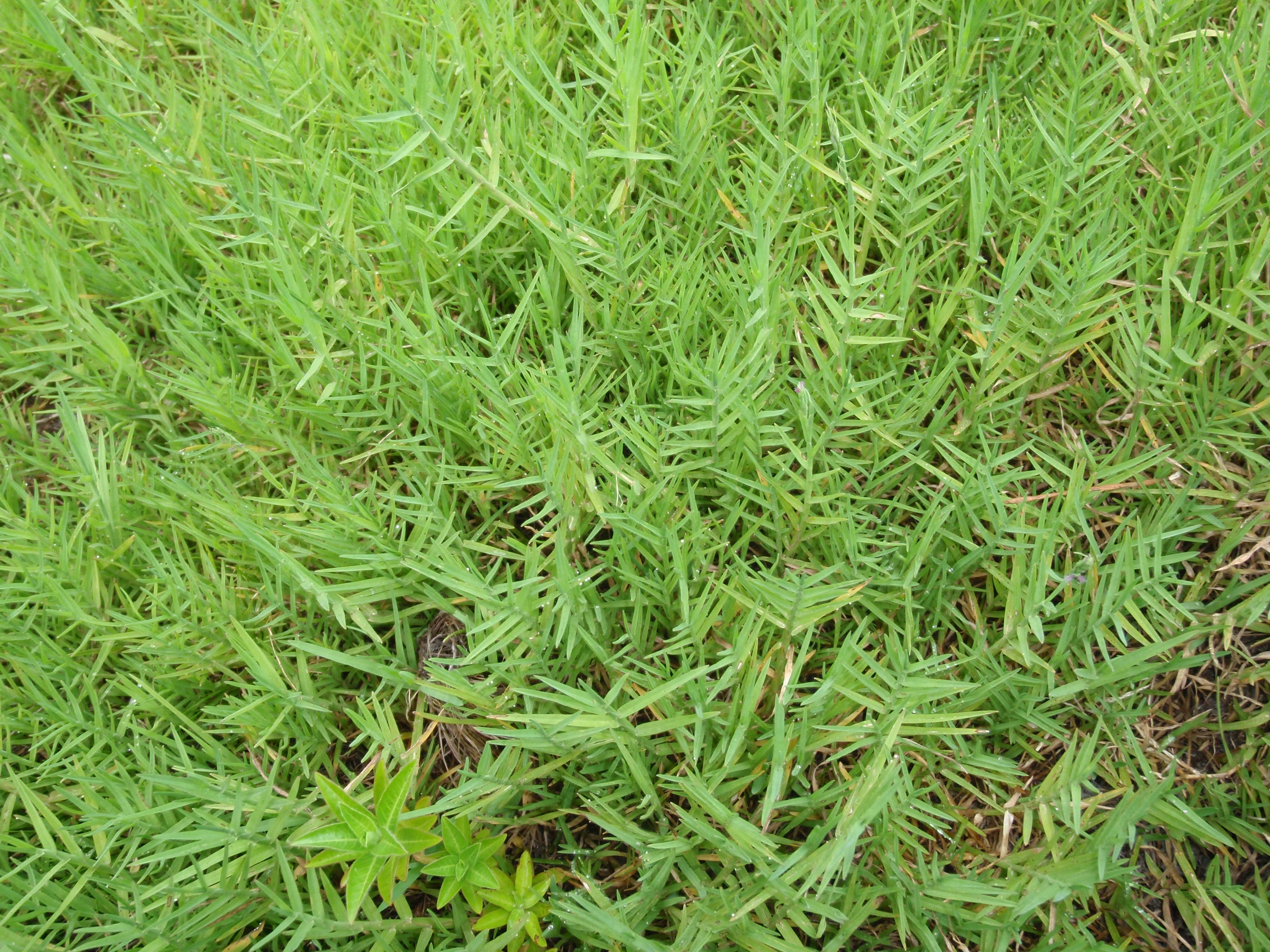
- Pseudoraphis spinescens

Scientific classification
- Kingdom: Plantae
- Clade: Tracheophytes
- Clade: Angiosperms
- Clade: Monocots
- Clade: Commelinids
- Order: Poales
- Family: Poaceae
- Subfamily: Panicoideae
- Genus: Pseudoraphis
- Species: P. spinescens

Binomial name
- Pseudoraphis spinescens (R.Br.) Vickery

Synonyms
- Panicum spinescens R.Br.

= Pseudoraphis spinescens =

Species of grass

Pseudoraphis spinescens, called spiny mudgrass or Moira grass is a rhizomatous and stoloniferous aquatic or semi-aquatic perennial grass, with ascending stems forming loose, floating mats in water to 1 m deep or more, or with stems to 50 cm high when not submerged. Moira grass (Pseudoraphis spinescens) was first described in 1810 by Robert Brown as Panicum spinescens, and subsequently transferred to Pseudoraphis by Joyce W. Vickery in 1950.

Pseudoraphis spinescens is native to floodplains in Asia and Australasia, it is a C4 species, requiring seasonal cycles of prolonged, deep flooding interspersed with drying to achieve maximum growth and reproduction. Between flood events, P. spinescens forms a deep thatch of collapsed dry stems until flooding recurs and growth recommences. A study in southeastern Australia found that P. spinescens does not have a viable long-lived seed bank in floodplain soil, presumably regenerating from vegetative propagules and rootstocks.

In the Murray-Darling Basin, prior to regulation of the Murray River, extensive Pseudoraphis spinescens dominated floodplain marshes existed in areas that were typically seasonally flooded for 5–9 months duration in most years, to a minimum water depth of 0.5 m, and completely dry during late summer and autumn.

Pseudoraphis spinescens is an important species in floodplain marsh ecosystems, providing habitat and food for a range of fauna including birds, frogs, fish and insects, and key ecosystem functions such as nutrient cycling and primary productivity.

== Significance in the Murray Darling Basin ==
The Barmah Forest Ramsar site on the Murray River floodplain in northern Victoria (Australia) is a bioregionally significant seasonal floodplain wetland, historically the most extensive areas of Moira grass (Pseudoraphis spinescens) plains in the Murray-Darling Basin occurred in this region.

The extent of floodplain marshes in Barmah forest has been severely reduced since European settlement, with the introduction of large grazing animals and the diversion of water from the Murray River. Floodplain areas previously dominated by aquatic species such as Moira grass (Pseudoraphis spinescens), common reed (Phragmites australis) and cumbungi (Typha spp.) are now covered with species adapted to lower levels of flooding, mainly river red gums (Eucalyptus camaldulensis) and giant rush (Juncus ingens).

A 2017 CSIRO analysis found that the management changes most likely to result in an increase in the current extent of Moira grass plains in Barmah National Park, over the next 10 years are reducing grazing, and increasing flood duration and depth. Most significantly, the removal of the large population of feral horses in Barmah National Park is estimated to result in a 61% increase in the current extent of the Moira grass plains. An analysis of the rate of vegetation change in Barmah Forest, published in 2014, predicted that if no management actions were taken, Pseudoraphis spinescens dominated grassy wetlands would become locally extinct by 2026.

Water regime for vigorous growth

Maintenance: Flooding for vigorous grasslands of Pseudoraphis spinescens should be seasonal, annual and fairly predictable, with a seasonal dry phase. Small variations in water regime favour its competitors, leading to a compositional or structural change. Growth after flooding is from rootstock, rather than fragments or seeds.

Frequency of flooding: Annual or near annual, i.e. every year, occasionally once in two years.
Depth of flooding: Initially depth is not critical: flood peak may exceed 2 m, then water levels should stabilise at about 1 to 1.5 m for two to three months, but not less than 0.5 m until drying out.
Duration of flooding: On average about seven months. Can tolerate less: no less than five months if starting in winter, and no less than three months if starting in spring. Can tolerate longer: but durations of 10 months should happen rarely and not in sequential years.
Timing of flooding: Floods can start at any time from winter to early spring.

Regeneration: Importance of seeds and seed bank is not known. No information on seedling growth.
Critical flood interval: Reflood after two years to maintain vigour. Pseudoraphis spinescens grasslands should not be without flooding for more than five years.
