= Yielima =

- Town
- Coordinates: 35°55′46″S 145°12′37″E
- Country: Australia
- State: Victoria
- Region: Hume
- LGA: Shire of Moira

Government
  - State electorate: Shepparton
  - Federal division: Nicholls

Population
  - Total: 87 (2016 census)
- Postcode: 3638
Localities around Yielima
| New South Wales | New South Wales | New South Wales |
| Picola | Yielima | Yalca |
| Picola | Nathalia | Nathalia |

Yielima is a locality in northern Victoria, Australia in the local government area of the Shire of Moira.

The New South Wales border is to the north of the locality.
