= Juncus ingens =

Scientific classification
- Kingdom: Plantae
- Clade: Embryophytes
- Clade: Tracheophytes
- Clade: Angiosperms
- Clade: Monocots
- Clade: Commelinids
- Order: Poales
- Family: Juncaceae
- Genus: Juncus
- Species: J. ingens

Binomial name
- Juncus ingens N.A.Wakef.

Species of flowering plant

Juncus ingens, common name giant rush, is a dioecious perennial with horizontal or ascending rhizomes. The stems are erect, dull green, (1.5–2–5 m tall and 4–10 mm in diameter, cataphylls are to 40 cm or more long. The inflorescence is large and drooping, with many flowers scattered along fine branchlets. Flowers occur mostly October-January, seeds are shed mostly December-April. Juncus ingens was first described by Norman Wakefield in 1957. It is one of only two known dioecious species of Juncus native to Australia, the other being Juncus psammophilus.

Juncus ingens is native to the floodplains of southeastern Australia, occurring mainly in Victoria, forming dense stands on the margins of seasonal wetlands. Giant rush is rarely grazed by introduced herbivores such as cattle or horses, or by native herbivores such as kangaroos, and is also resistant to fire.

Although native to Australia, Juncus ingens is considered an invasive species in some areas such as Barmah National Park. The spread of J. ingens into areas where it historically did not occur is a result of changes to flooding regimes in the now highly regulated Murray–Darling Basin. Specifically, reduced winter flooding levels and extended flooding into summer months promotes the spread of J. ingens. Conversely, increasing winter and spring flood depth and duration, and reduction of unseasonal flooding limits the growth and spread of J. ingens, allowing recolonisation of displaced species such as Moira grass (Pseudoraphis spinescens).

Water regime for vigorous growth

Maintenance:

Frequency of flooding: Annual to nearly annual.
Depth of flooding: Shallow, 5 to 50 cm; can tolerate up to 1 m.
Duration of flooding: Eight to 10 months
Timing of flooding: At least spring to early autumn.

Regeneration: Germination occurs on moist soil, bare of plants, such as on flood recession or wetland drawdown, in late autumn and winter.

Seedling establishment: Establishment is increased by shallow flooding, to 20 cm, in spring–early summer; and by avoiding stresses such as overtopping or droughting in the first two years.

Critical flood interval: Not certain. Maintains canopy in absence of flooding for a few years, but rhizomes probably persist longer; possibly reflood after about three to five years. Seed longevity not known."
