= Joseph Waldo Rice =

American-born entrepreneur

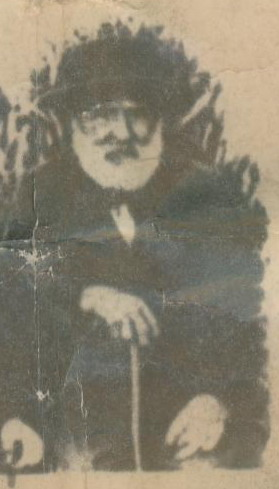
- Joseph Waldo Rice circa 1900
- Born: 8 February 1828; Lincoln, Massachusetts, US
- Died: 26 February 1915 (aged 87); Moama, New South Wales, Australia
- Resting place: Barmah, Victoria, Australia
- Known for: early pioneering of Moira Lakes Region of Victoria, Australia and proprietor of the Murray Fishing Company
- Spouse: Mary Ann (Gill) Rice

Joseph Waldo Rice (1828–1915) was an American-born entrepreneur who was the first person of European descent to settle the Moira Lakes region near Barmah, Victoria, Australia. He was the proprietor of the Murray Fishing Company serving to provision prospectors and gold miners in the Bendigo region beginning in the early 1850s.

== Early life and education ==
Joseph Waldo Rice was born on 8 February 1828, in Lincoln, Massachusetts, to Henry Rice and Mary (Sherbourne) Rice. After attending public schools in Lincoln, Massachusetts, he set out as prospector in the gold fields of California about 1850. In 1853 with several colleagues from California, he chartered a vessel in San Francisco to sail for the gold fields of Bendigo, Australia.

== Life and career in Australia ==
Rice arrived in Victoria, Australia in 1853 to try his luck on the Australian gold fields near Bendigo. Shortly thereafter, learning that fish were very plentiful in the Murray River, he left the gold fields and after a short time and settled in Moira Lakes near Barmah, Victoria and in 1856 established the Murray Fishing Company to supply the Bendigo gold fields with about a ton of fish per week, transported over 80 miles (130 km) by spring cart. Rice died on 26 February 1915 in Moama, New South Wales, and was buried in the Barmah Cemetery in Barma, Victoria along with his wife Mary Ann (Gill) Rice who died twenty years earlier on 21 October 1895. Many of his descendants still live in Barmah district.

== Genealogy ==
Rice was a direct descendant of Edmund Rice, an early English immigrant to Massachusetts Bay Colony, as follows:

- Joseph Waldo Rice, son of

- Henry Rice (1794 – 1858), son of
- Gershom Rice (1755 – 1837), son of
- Gershom Rice (1710 – 1790), son of

- Jacob Rice (1660 – 1746), son of
- Edward Rice (1626 – 1712), son of

- Edmund Rice (1594 – 1663)
