= Nathalia =

- Town
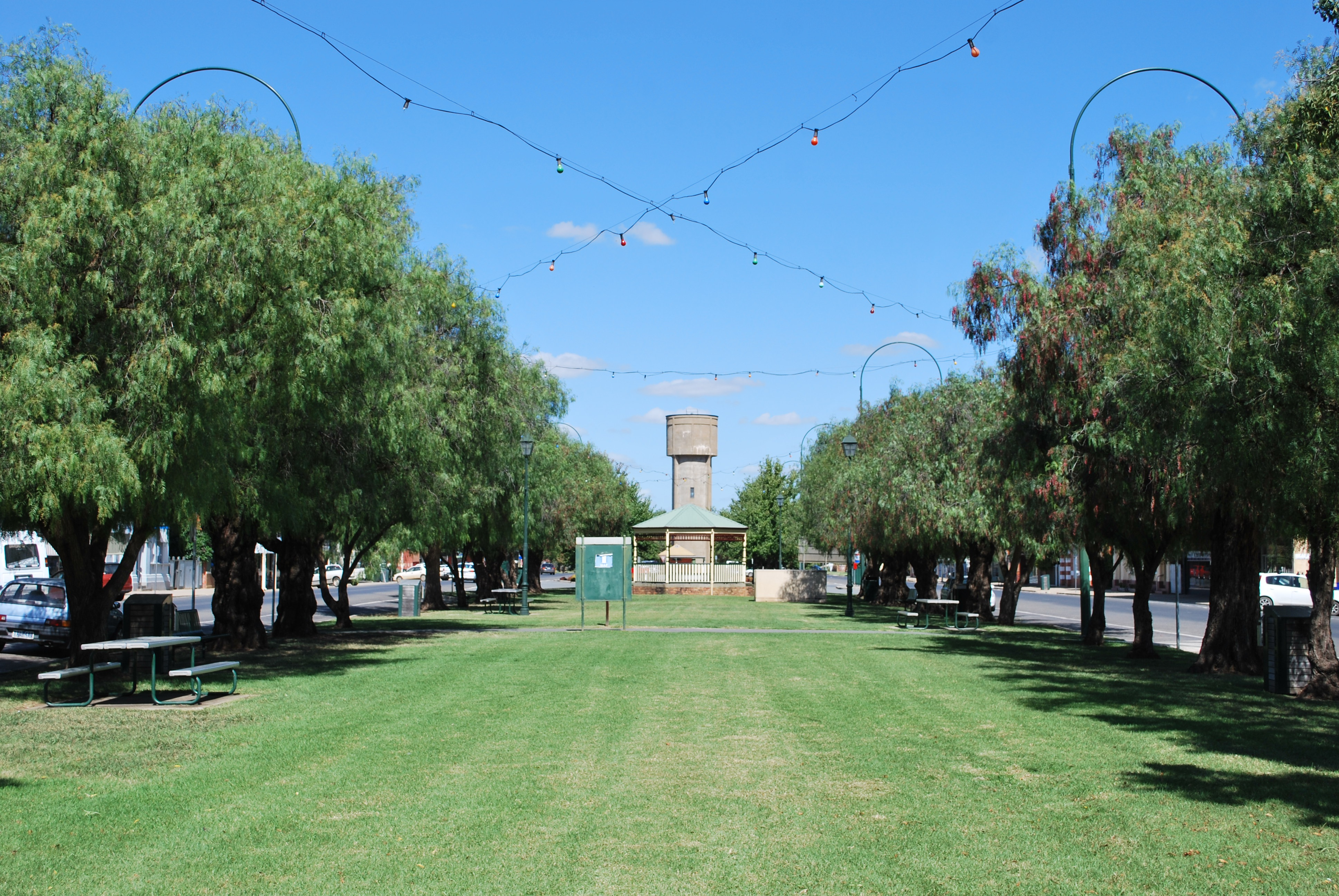
- Park in the centre of Blake St, the main street of town

- Interactive map of Nathalia
- Coordinates: 36°03′30″S 145°12′13″E
- Country: Australia
- State: Victoria
- Region: Hume
- LGA: Shire of Moira
- Location: 217 km (135 mi) from Melbourne; 42 km (26 mi) from Shepparton; 56 km (35 mi) from Echuca
- Established: 1875

Government
  - State electorate: Shepparton
  - Federal division: Nicholls

Population
  - Total: 1,982 (2021 census)
- Postcode: 3638
Localities around Nathalia
Picola	Yielima	Yalca
Picola	Nathalia	Waaia
Kotupna	Kotupna	Kaarimba

Nathalia (/nəˈθeɪliə/ nə-THAY-li-ə) is a town in northern Victoria, Australia. The town is located within the Shire of Moira local government area on the banks of Broken Creek and on the Murray Valley Highway. At the 2021 census, Nathalia had a population of 1,982.

== History ==
Prior to European settlement, the area around Nathalia was occupied by the Yorta Yorta people. In 1838, Charles Sturt was the first European to explore the area, following the Murray River downstream. The squatter, W.J Locke established Kotupna station on the future site of Nathalia in 1843. The station was broken up for closer settlement in 1869. A selector, Richard Blake took up the townsite in 1875 and established a sawmill and flour mill soon after. Hotels, a post office (opened on 7 September 1878), schools and churches followed and Nathalia was officially gazetted as a village in 1880. The railway arrived in 1888, allowing local production to increase and a butter factory was established in 1895.

The Nathalia Magistrates' Court closed on 1 January 1990.

== Economy ==
Agriculture is the mainstay of the Nathalia area's economy, particularly cropping, dairy farming, and grazing. Some of the town's major businesses are Rex James Stockfeed, Trans Tank International (TTi), Remax Products, and Ryan's abattoirs.

== Education ==
Nathalia has five schools, both a government high school and primary school as well as a regional Catholic college and a Catholic primary school. There is also a campus of the Glenvale School, an independent primary and secondary school. There is also a pre school and a new child care facility in Nathalia.

== Sporting ==
The town is well known for quality sporting facilities for its size. Notable sporting clubs in Nathalia include Nathalia Football Club competing in the Murray Football League. Recent premierships for the NFNC are 2005 (undefeated) 2006, 2007, 2008, 2012, 2015, 2016, 2017, 2018 and 2019.

Golfers play at the course of the Nathalia Golf Club on Paynes Road.

Nathalia also has an active Canoe club, Lawn tennis club, bowls club and the Nathalia Association Cricket Club.

== Barmah Forest Heritage and Education Centre ==
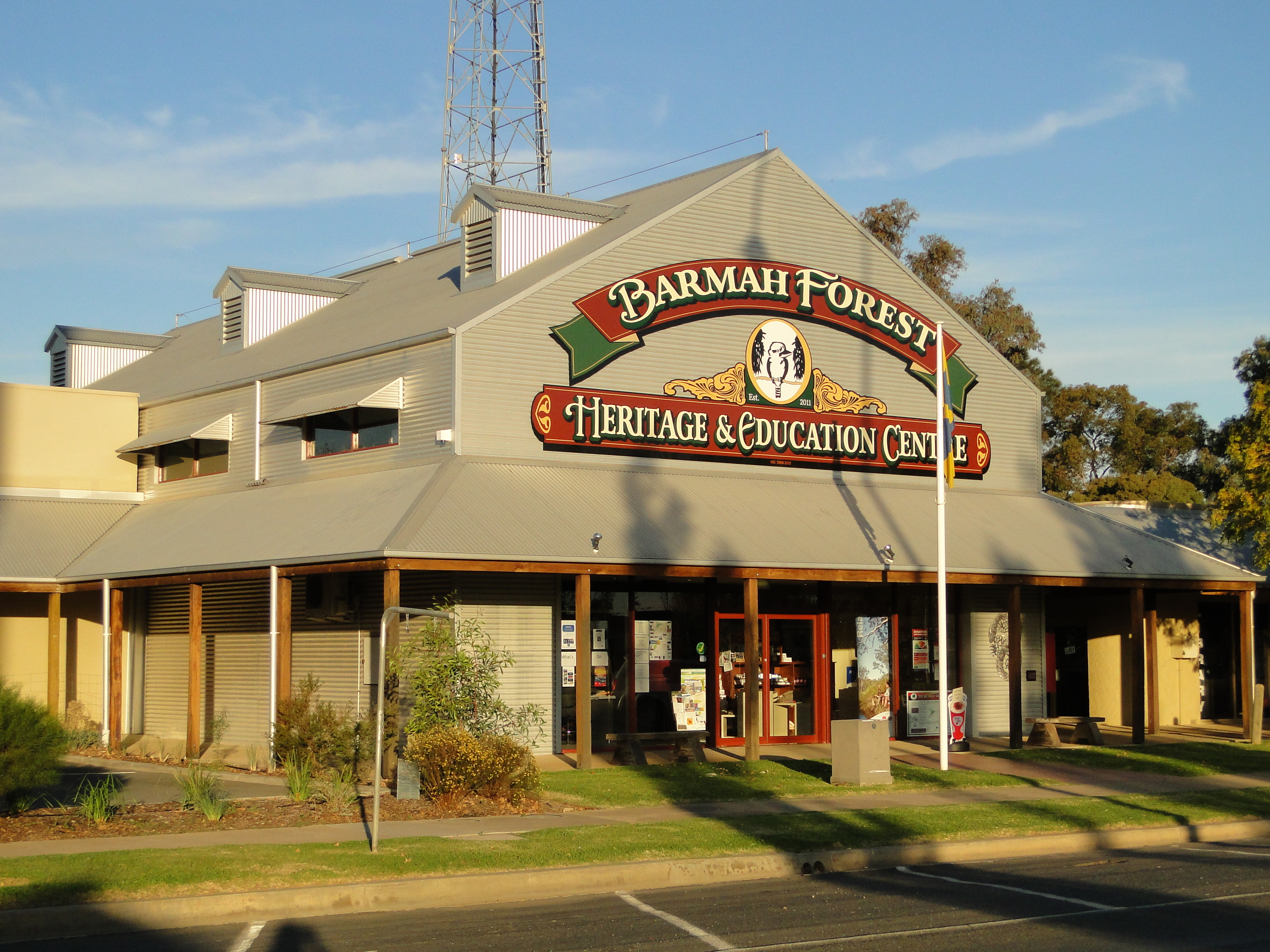
The Barmah Forest Heritage and Education Centre

The Barmah Forest Heritage and Education Centre is a large building featuring displays on the history and the environment of the nearby Barmah Forest and Barmah National Park.

The centre opened in 2011 with funding from the Victorian government and the Moira Shire Council.

A feature of the building is the use of redgum timber recycled from the old wharf at Echuca. It is open from 9.00am-5.00pm every day.

== Cultural Activities ==
The annual agricultural show is held on the first Saturday in October. The Nathalia and Lower Moira Agricultural Pastoral and Horticultural Association held its first agricultural show in 1888, after a prolonged drought in the district. A New Year's Eve carnival is held every year.

Nathalia is developing its creative arts tourist potential through the Nathalia Living Arts/ Rural Arts Project. This had previously been under the guidance of internationally recognised resident artist William Kelly until his death.

== Natural Attractions ==
Nathalia is nearby the Barmah National Park and Murray River. Barmah National Park is the world's largest redgum forest, and listed as a Ramsar site of international significance. The town also receives economic benefit from tourism generated by the Murray River, with tourists participating in activities such as camping, skiing and water fishing. Similarly, fishing and camping are possible at Goulburn River and Lower Goulburn National Park, which are also hear the town.
