= Barmah National Park =

National park in Victoria, Australia

- IUCN category II (national park)
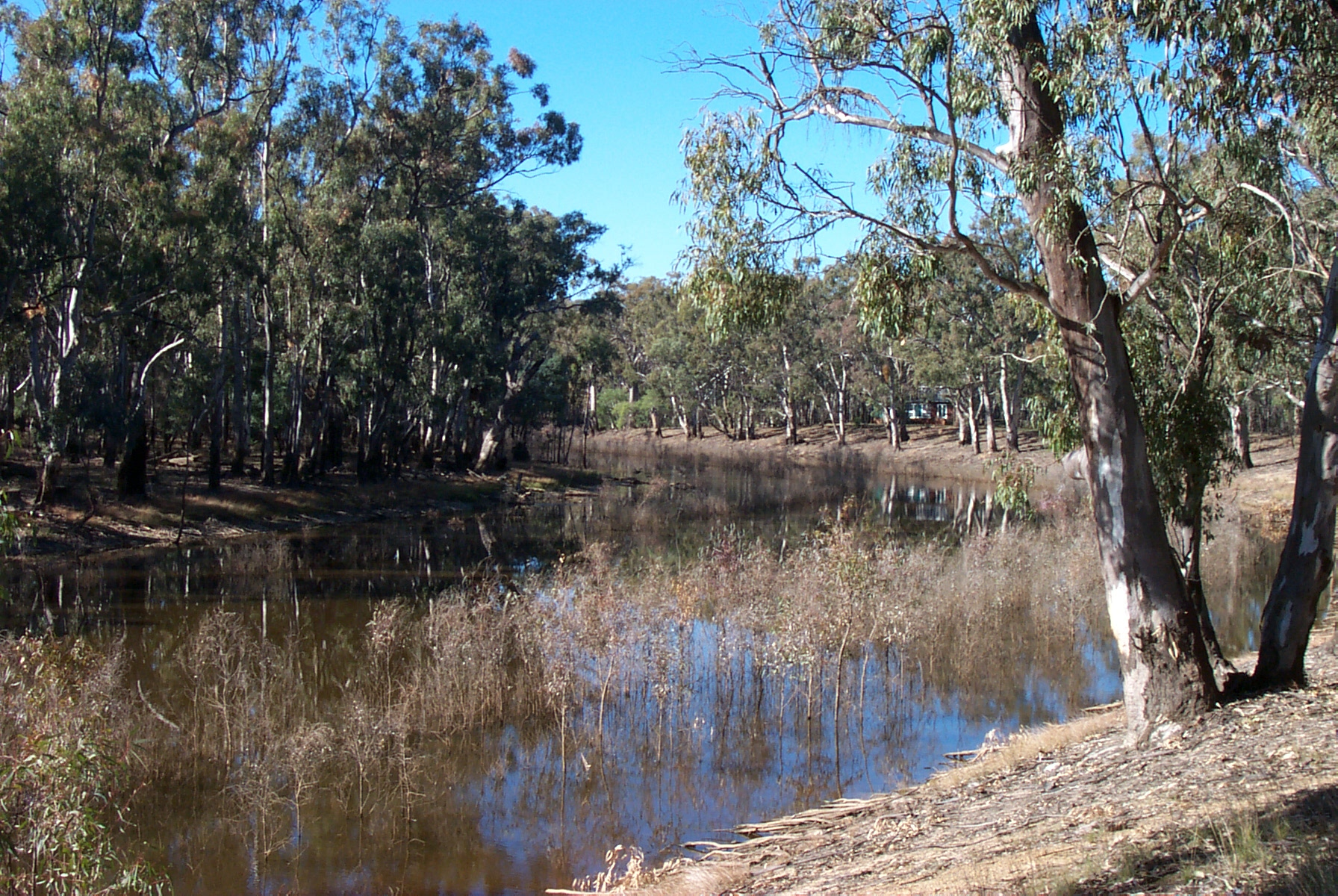
- River red gums along the Murray River, adjacent to the national park

- Location within Victoria
- Location: Victoria
- Nearest city: Barmah
- Coordinates: 35°52′00″S 145°07′05″E
- Area: 285.21 km^{2} (110.12 sq mi)
- Established: 2010
- Governing body: Parks Victoria
- Website: http://parkweb.vic.gov.au/explore/parks/barmah-national-park

The Barmah National Park, formerly Barmah State Park, is a national park located in the Hume region of the Australian state of Victoria. The park is located adjacent to the Murray River near the town of Barmah, approximately 225 kilometres (140 mi) north of Melbourne. The park consists of river red gum floodplain forest, interspersed with treeless freshwater marshes. The area is subject to seasonal flooding from natural and irrigation water flows.

The 60,000-hectare (150,000-acre) Barmah-Millewa Forest, consisting of the Barmah Forest (Victoria) and the Millewa group of forests (New South Wales), forms the largest river red gum forest in the world. The Barmah Forest Ramsar site is an internationally recognised wetland, listed under the Ramsar Convention, and a number of bird species that utilise the Barmah National Park are part of the Japan-Australia Migratory Bird Agreement and the China-Australia Migratory Bird Agreement. Note that the areas of the Barmah National Park and the Barmah Forest Ramsar site mostly overlap, but are not identical, Barmah National Park site includes the western part of Ulupna Island in the north east, but not the Murray River Park to the south east. The Barmah Forest Ramsar site boundary does not include Ulupna Island, but does include the Murray River Park to the south east. The overall area of the red gum forest on the Victorian side is colloquially defined as the Barmah Forest.

Barmah National Park is a popular camping, walking, fishing, boating and canoeing and swimming destination.

== Climate ==
The Barmah National Park is known as a temperate semi-arid region, with low rainfall and high evaporation. Average temperature maximums for the year are around 30 °C (86 °F) in January and February, with average minimum temperatures down to 4 °C (39 °F) in July. Average rainfall for the year is 400 millimetres (16 in), with the most rain falling in winter with an average monthly rainfall of 40 millimetres (1.6 in).

== History ==
The Barmah Forest was originally utilised by Indigenous Australians, including the Yorta Yorta and Bangerang people, to find food, shelter and materials. Following the settlement of Europeans into the area, Barmah Forest became an important fishing and logging area, with surrounding land cleared for agriculture and grazing. Rabbits, foxes, sheep, cattle and horses were introduced into the area. Hardwood timber was harvested from the Barmah region from around 1870, and logging of river red gum and seasonal cattle grazing were important local industries until recently, ceasing when the national park was created. The Barmah muster yards, located in the southern end of the park, and used for management of cattle grazed in the surrounding river red gum forests, were heritage listed in 2009. Cattle grazing was banned in all river red gum national parks in 2015. The park contains a large population of wild horses, which mainly originate from free roaming horses that either escaped or were purposely released for breeding stock in the mid 1800s. Stock released by a local trotting horse breeder after 1952 bolstered their population after the last great roundup of 1949, when approximately 70 wild horses remained in the Barmah Forest.

Barmah State Park was established in 1987, and was legislated as Barmah National Park in 2010. The park is one of four river red gum national parks established by the Victorian Government in 2010 to protect remnant river red gum forest. The other river red gum national parks are the Gunbower National Park (created 2009), Hattah-Kulkyne National Park (1978), Lower Goulburn National Park (2009), Murray-Sunset National Park (1991) and the Warby-Ovens National Park (2009).

In July 2010, the Government of New South Wales declared the Millewa Forest, on the northern banks of the Murray River, as a national park. The 41,601-hectare (102,800-acre) forest was renamed as the Murray Valley National Park, making the combined reserves a 70,000-hectare (170,000-acre) cross–border national park, managed by both governments and the traditional owners.The combined parks are the largest continuous red gum forest in the world.

== Changes to flooding ==
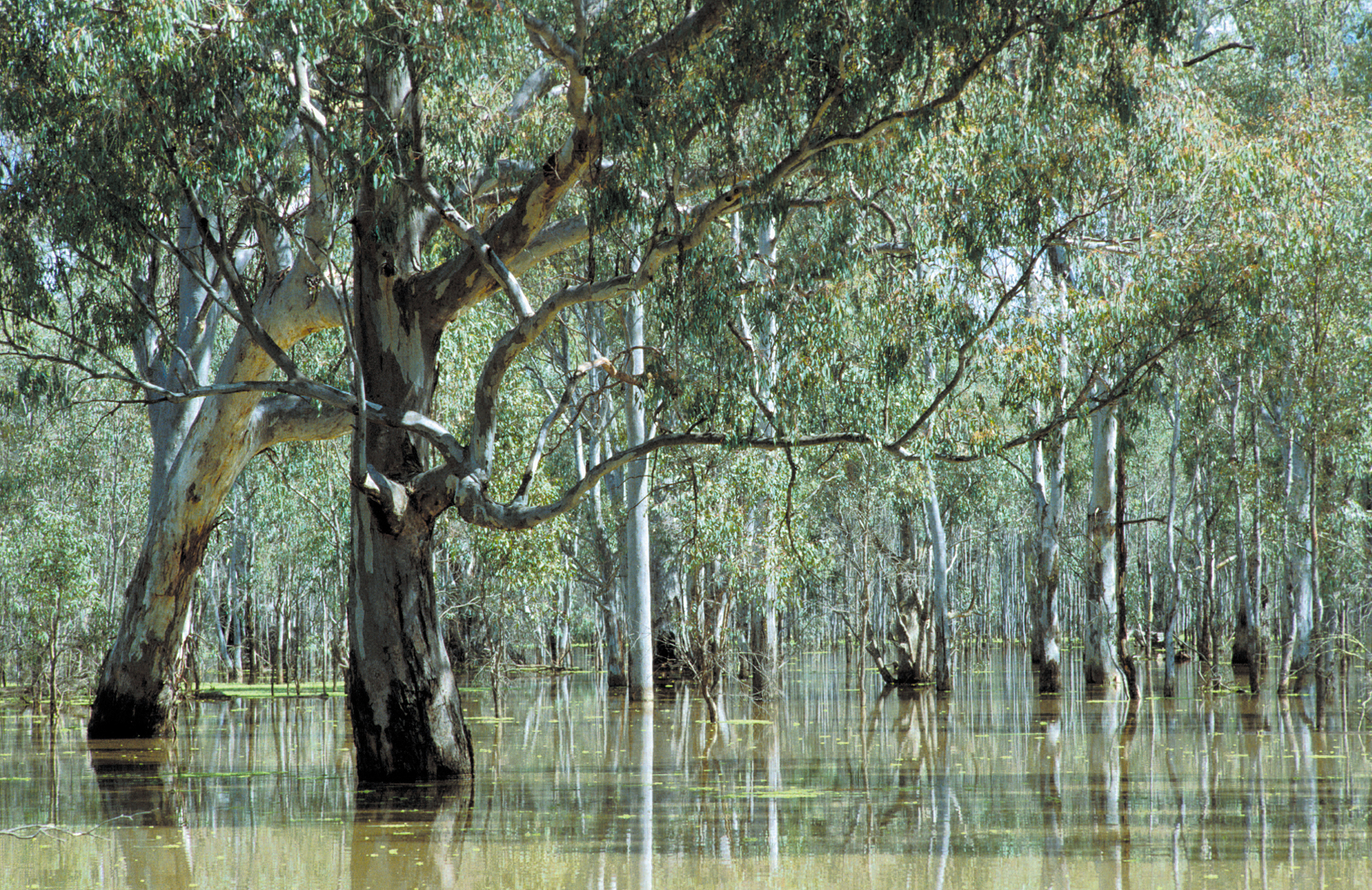
Flooded Barmah forest river red gums

The Barmah Choke and the Narrows, a section of the Murray River where flow is restricted by a geological fault (the Cadell Fault), naturally cause the overflow of water into the Barmah Forest when the river flow is high.

Historically, the Barmah National Park and surrounding river red gum forests would flood naturally in winter and spring in most years, and river flows were very low in late-summer and autumn. Since clearing for agriculture and the subsequent dam construction took place, the Murray River has undergone extensive flow regulation. The construction of dams upstream from the Barmah National Park, from the 1920s onwards, has had a vast impact on the water flowing in the Murray River and instances of flooding, the flow of water is now highly regulated. The Hume Dam was operational from 1936, the Yarrawonga Weir in 1939, and the Dartmouth Dam from 1979.

As a consequence of flow regulation, the winter and spring floods are now reduced, and of shorter duration than previously, with more low level flooding occurring in summer and autumn. The increased incidents of smaller summer and autumn floods, which affect low-lying areas of Barmah National Park, are sometimes caused by heavy rains. More often, they occur because there is sufficient rainfall for irrigated farmland between the Hume Dam and the Barmah Forest, consequently river diverters do not choose to take allocated water, Lake Mulwala (Yarrawonga Weir) also has inadequate storage, resulting in high level river flows referred to as "rainfall rejections".

These unseasonal high level river flows result in unseasonal flooding in the Barmah-Millewa Forest, which has a significant effect on forest and wetland ecology, degrading wetlands by interfering with the natural drying-out phase and by disrupting nutrient cycling processes. In recent years, unseasonal flooding is being controlled, and "environmental water" is being released to offset some of the detrimental effects of river regulation on the ecosystems along the lower reaches of the Murray River. Management of environmental water supplied through the Murray-Darling basin to the Barmah–Millewa Forest is complex, and mainly under the control of the Murray-Darling Basin Authority. In Victoria the Victorian Environmental Water Holder also manages environmental water allocations.

The supply of environmental water to Barmah Forest aims to:

- Enhance the health of river red gum communities and aquatic vegetation in the wetlands and watercourses and on the floodplain, and promote the growth of floodplain marsh vegetation communities, particularly the extent of Moira grass
- Maintain or increase available habitat for frogs and turtles
- Provide feeding and nesting habitat for colonial nesting waterbirds
- Provide native fish with access to a range of floodplain, riverine and refuge habitats including by delivering variable flows that promote spawning
- Enable nutrient cycling (particularly carbon) between the floodplain and river through connectivity Provide early-season flushing of the lower floodplain to cycle nutrients during cooler conditions and reduce the risk of poor water quality events in summer

== Ecology ==
The Barmah National Park is a river red gum forest, consisting of an upper storey of red gums, no shrub layer or middle storey, and a ground storey of native grasses, sedges and rushes. The edges of the forest merge into a eucalypt-box woodland.

The park is a large flood plain and wetland area, with flooding of the Murray River occurring sporadically, both naturally and due to flow regulation of the river.

Threatened species of flora found in Barmah National Park may be listed under the DELWP Advisory List of Rare or Threatened Plants in Victoria, the Flora and Fauna Guarantee Act 1988 (FFG), or the Environment Protection and Biodiversity Conservation Act 1999 (EBPC). Many listed plant species do not have Wikipedia pages, more information can be found on the Vicflora database.

List of threatened native flora occurring in Barmah National Park
Image	Scientific Name	Common Name	DELWP	FFG	EPBC	Group
	Allocasuarina luehmannii	buloke	e - endangered in Victoria	Listed as threatened in Victoria		tree
	Alternanthera nodiflora	common joyweed	k - poorly known in Victoria			forb
	Alternanthera sp. 1	plains joyweed	k - poorly known in Victoria			forb
	Amyema linophylla subsp. orientale	buloke mistletoe	v - vulnerable in Victoria			hemiparasitic shrub
	Ammannia multiflora	jerry-jerry	v - vulnerable in Victoria			forb
	Amphibromus fluitans	river swamp wallaby-grass	v - vulnerable in Victoria		VU - vulnerable in Australia	grass
	Atriplex spinibractea	spiny-fruit saltbush	e - endangered in Victoria			forb
	Brachyscome chrysoglossa	yellow-tongue daisy	v - vulnerable in Victoria	Listed as threatened in Victoria		forb
	Brachyscome muelleroides	Mueller daisy	e - endangered in Victoria	Listed as threatened in Victoria	VU - vulnerable in Australia	forb
	Brachyscome readeri (listed as Brachyscome sp. aff. readeri)	Riverina daisy	v - vulnerable in Victoria			forb
	Calotis cuneifolia	blue burr-daisy	r - rare in Victoria			forb
	Cardamine moirensis	Riverina bitter-cress	r - rare in Victoria			forb
	Cardamine tenuifolia	slender bitter-cress	k - poorly known in Victoria			forb
	Centipeda nidiformis	cotton sneezeweed	r - rare in Victoria			forb
	Coronidium gunnianum (listed as Coronidium scorpioides aff. rutidolepis (Lowland Swamps))	pale swamp everlasting	v - vulnerable in Victoria			forb
	Cullen parvum	small scurf-pea	e - endangered in Victoria	Listed as threatened in Victoria		forb
	Cymbonotus lawsonianus	bear's-ear	r - rare in Victoria			forb
	Cynodon dactylon var. pulchellus	native couch	k - poorly known in Victoria			grass
	Cyperus bifax	downs nutgrass	v - vulnerable in Victoria			sedge
	Cyperus flaccidus	lax flat-sedge	v - vulnerable in Victoria			sedge
	Cyperus victoriensis	yelka	k - poorly known in Victoria			sedge
	Desmodium varians	slender tick-trefoil	k - poorly known in Victoria			forb
	Dianella longifolia var. grandis (listed as Dianella sp. aff. longifolia (Riverina)	pale flax-lily	v - vulnerable in Victoria			forb
	Digitaria ammophila	silky umbrella-grass	v - vulnerable in Victoria			grass
	Eleocharis pallens	pale spike-sedge	k - poorly known in Victoria			sedge
	Eragrostis exigua	slender love-grass	e - endangered in Victoria			grass
	Fimbristylis aestivalis	summer fringe-sedge	k - poorly known in Victoria			sedge
	Gratiola pumilo	dwarf brooklime	r - rare in Victoria			forb
	Haloragis glauca f. glauca	bluish raspwort	k - poorly known in Victoria			forb
	Hypsela tridens	hypsela	k - poorly known in Victoria			forb
	Lepidium monoplocoides	winged peppercress	e - endangered in Victoria	Listed as threatened in Victoria	EN - endangered in Australia	forb
	Lepidium pseudohyssopifolium	native peppercress	k - poorly known in Victoria			forb
	Lipocarpha microcephala	button rush	v - vulnerable in Victoria			rush
	Lotus australis var. australis	austral trefoil	k - poorly known in Victoria			forb
	Minuria integerrima	smooth minuria	r - rare in Victoria			forb
	Myoporum montanum	waterbush	r - rare in Victoria			shrub
	Nymphoides crenata	wavy marshwort	v - vulnerable in Victoria	Listed as threatened in Victoria		forb
	Picris squarrosa	squat picris	r - rare in Victoria			forb
	Ranunculus pumilio var. politus	ferny small-flower buttercup	k - poorly known in Victoria			forb
	Rhodanthe stricta	slender sunray	e - endangered in Victoria	Listed as threatened in Victoria		forb
	Rorippa eustylis	dwarf bitter-cress	r - rare in Victoria			forb
	Sclerolaena muricata var. semiglabra	dark roly-poly	k - poorly known in Victoria			shrub
	Sida intricata	twiggy sida	v - vulnerable in Victoria			forb
	Swainsona adenophylla	violet swainson-pea	e - endangered in Victoria	Listed as threatened in Victoria		forb
	Tripogonella loliiformis (listed as syn. Tripogon loliiformis)	rye beetle-grass	r - rare in Victoria			grass
	Wahlenbergia tumidifructa	mallee annual-bluebell	r - rare in Victoria			forb

=== Fauna ===
Threatened species of native fauna occurring in Barmah National Park may be listed under the DELWP Advisory List of Threatened Vertebrate Fauna, the Flora and Fauna Guarantee Act 1988 (FFG), or the Environment Protection and Biodiversity Conservation Act 1999 (EBPC).

List of threatened native fauna occurring in Barmah National Park
Image	Scientific Name	Common Name	DELWP	FFG	EPBC	Group
	Anilios proximus (listed as syn. Ramphotyphlops proximus)	proximus blind snake	nt - near threatened in Victoria			reptile
	Anas rhynchotis	australasian shoveler	vu - vulnerable in Victoria			bird
	Ardea intermedia	intermediate egret	e - endangered in Victoria	listed as threatened in Victoria		bird
	Ardea modesta	eastern great egret	vu - vulnerable in Victoria	listed as threatened in Victoria		bird
	Aythya australis	hardhead	vu - vulnerable in Victoria			bird
	Bidyanus bidyanus	silver perch	vu - vulnerable in Victoria	listed as threatened in Victoria		fish
	Biziura lobata	musk duck	vu - vulnerable in Victoria			bird
	Botaurus poiciloptilus	Australasian bittern	e - endangered in Victoria	listed as threatened in Victoria	EN - endangered in Australia	bird
	Ceyx azureus (listed as syn. Alcedo azurea)	azure kingfisher	nt - near threatened in Victoria			bird
	Chlidonias hybrida javanicus (listed as Chlidonias hybridus javanicus)	whiskered tern	nt - near threatened in Victoria			bird
	Circus assimilis (listed as Circus assimilus)	spotted harrier	nt - near threatened in Victoria			bird
	Climacteris picumnus victoriae	brown treecreeper	nt - near threatened in Victoria			bird
	Craterocephalus fluviatilis	Murray hardyhead	cr - critically endangered in Victoria	listed as threatened in Victoria	EN - endangered in Australia	fish
	Dromaius novaehollandiae	emu	nt - near threatened in Victoria			bird
	Egretta garzetta nigripes	little egret	e - endangered in Victoria	listed as threatened in Victoria		bird
	Falco subniger	black falcon	vu - vulnerable in Victoria			bird
	Galaxias rostratus	flat-headed galaxias	vu - vulnerable in Victoria	I - rejected for listing as threatened; taxon invalid or ineligible		fish
	Gallinago hardwickii	Latham's snipe	nt - near threatened in Victoria	N - nominated for listing as threatened in Victoria		bird
	Geopelia cuneata	diamond dove	nt - near threatened in Victoria	listed as threatened in Victoria		bird
	Grantiella picta	painted honeyeater	vu - vulnerable in Victoria	listed as threatened in Victoria		bird
	Grus rubicunda	brolga	vu - vulnerable in Victoria	listed as threatened in Victoria		bird
	Haliaeetus leucogaster	white-bellied sea-eagle	vu - vulnerable in Victoria	listed as threatened in Victoria		bird
	Hirundapus caudacutus	white-throated needletail	vu - vulnerable in Victoria			bird
	Ixobrychus dubius	Australian little bittern	e - endangered in Victoria	listed as threatened in Victoria		bird
	Limnodynastes interioris	giant banjo frog	cr - critically endangered in Victoria	listed as threatened in Victoria		amphibian
	Lophochroa leadbeateri leadbeateri (listed as syn. Cacatua leadbeateri leadbeateri)	Major Mitchell's cockatoo	vu - vulnerable in Victoria	listed as threatened in Victoria		bird
	Lophoictinia isura	square-tailed kite	vu - vulnerable in Victoria	listed as threatened in Victoria		bird
	Maccullochella macquariensis	trout cod	cr - critically endangered in Victoria	listed as threatened in Victoria	EN - endangered in Australia	fish
	Maccullochella peelii	Murray cod	vu - vulnerable in Victoria	listed as threatened in Victoria	VU - vulnerable in Australia	fish
	Macquaria ambigua	golden perch (natural populations)	nt - near threatened in Victoria	I - rejected for listing as threatened; taxon invalid		fish
	Macquaria australasica	Macquarie perch	e - endangered in Victoria	listed as threatened in Victoria	EN - endangered in Australia	fish
	Melanodryas cucullata cucullata	hooded robin	nt - near threatened in Victoria	listed as threatened in Victoria		bird
	Melanotaenia fluviatilis	Murray-River rainbowfish	vu - vulnerable in Victoria	listed as threatened in Victoria		fish
	Morelia spilota metcalfei	carpet python	e - endangered in Victoria	listed as threatened in Victoria		reptile
	Myotis macropus	large-footed myotis	nt - near threatened in Victoria			mammal
	Nannoperca australis (Murray-Darling lineage)	southern pygmy perch (upper Murray River to Avoca River)	vu - vulnerable in Victoria			fish
	Ninox connivens connivens	barking owl	e - endangered in Victoria	listed as threatened in Victoria		bird
	Nycticorax caledonicus australasiae (listed as syn. Nycticorax caledonicus hillii)	nankeen night-heron	nt - near threatened in Victoria			bird
	Oxyura australis	blue-billed duck	e - endangered in Victoria	listed as threatened in Victoria		bird
	Petaurus norfolcensis	squirrel glider	e - endangered in Victoria	listed as threatened in Victoria		mammal
	Phalacrocorax varius	pied cormorant	nt - near threatened in Victoria			bird
	Phascogale tapoatafa tapoatafa	brush-tailed phascogale	vu - vulnerable in Victoria	listed as threatened in Victoria		mammal
	Platalea regia (listed as Platelea regia)	royal spoonbill	nt - near threatened in Victoria			bird
	Plegadis falcinellus	glossy ibis	nt - near threatened in Victoria			bird
	Pogona barbata	bearded dragon	vu - vulnerable in Victoria			reptile
	Polytelis swainsonii	superb parrot	e - endangered in Victoria	listed as threatened in Victoria	VU - vulnerable in Australia	bird
	Pomatostomus temporalis temporalis	grey-crowned babbler	e - endangered in Victoria	listed as threatened in Victoria		bird
	Stagonopleura guttata	diamond firetail	nt - near threatened in Victoria	listed as threatened in Victoria		bird
	Stictonetta naevosa	freckled duck	e - endangered in Victoria	listed as threatened in Victoria		bird
	Tandanus tandanus	freshwater catfish	e - endangered in Victoria	listed as threatened in Victoria		fish
	Tringa nebularia	common greenshank	vu - vulnerable in Victoria			bird
	Tyto novaehollandiae novaehollandiae	masked owl	e - endangered in Victoria	listed as threatened in Victoria		bird
	Varanus varius	lace monitor	e - endangered in Victoria			reptile
	Vermicella annulata	bandy-bandy	vu - vulnerable in Victoria	listed as threatened in Victoria		reptile

== Environmental threats ==
Following European settlement of the area, land was extensively cleared to allow for farming and agriculture. Sheep and cattle grazing was a common sight around the Barmah region from the mid to late 1800s. The periodic burning previously undertaken by Indigenous Australians was also halted. Logging of the river red gum forests was an important part of the late 1800s and early 1900s.

A significant decrease in breeding and occurrence of waterbirds, particular woodland bird species and species of migratory birds has been reported in the Barmah National Park. This decrease has been attributed to the changes to the flood regimes occurring in the area.

A number of marsupial species are also no longer found within the park, including the rufous bettong, bridled nailtail wallaby, western barred bandicoot, and lesser stick-nest rat. Their absence has been attributed to the introduction of rabbits and foxes.

Though the future impact of climate change on river red gum forests is unknown, there has already been a significant dieback of trees in the area due to ongoing evapotranspiration deficits.

In the Murray-Darling Basin, prior to regulation of the Murray River, extensive Moira grass (Pseudoraphis spinescens)–dominated floodplain marshes existed in areas that were typically seasonally flooded for 5–9 months duration in most years, to a minimum water depth of 0.5 m, and completely dry during late summer and autumn. Floodplain areas previously dominated by aquatic species, such as Moira grass, common reed (Phragmites australis), and cumbungi (Typha spp.), are now covered with species adapted to lower levels of flooding, mainly river red gums and giant rush (Juncus ingens).

The extent of the Moira grass-dominated plains has declined by 96 per cent over the last 80 years in the Barmah Forest, and they are predicted to be extinct in the Barmah Forest by 2026 without management intervention. Reductions in duration and depth of natural flooding due to regulation of the Murray River, grazing and trampling pressure by introduced animals, particularly by feral horses (and previously cattle), and invasive plant species are the main causes of this decline.

== Management ==
The Barmah Forest was declared as a national park by the Victorian Government in 2010 under the National Parks Act 1975. The park is managed as part of a collaboration between Parks Victoria and the traditional owners of the area, including the Yorta Yorta people.

Flow regulation of the Murray River to benefit the surrounding agricultural land, has been undertaken for many years. However, more recently the importance of environmental flows is becoming increasingly acknowledged. Scientific study has shown that river red gums rely on specific levels and durations of floods to survive and regenerate, similarly waterbird species also have very specific flood-related conditions to successfully breed and fledge chicks. Flow regimes are also very important for native fish species populations. Therefore, the alterations to the management of river red gum forests and regulation of water flows within the Murray River will be a very important area of study into the future.

The timing and frequency of ecological burns will also need to be carefully monitored for future management of the park, as the increase in fire frequency predicted under climate change models may adversely impact bird habitat and may favour invasive plant and animal species.

Parks Victoria's plan to reverse environmental degradation and definitively improve management of Barmah National Park prioritises timing of seasonal flooding to promote the growth of floodplain vegetation and provides habitat for breeding waterbirds, control of invasive plants, and the eradication of introduced grazing animals including horses, deer, pigs and goats. The aims of management plans are to protect the floodplain marshes, including increasing the extent of Moira grass plains, and to improve the quality of habitat for native flora and fauna in the Barmah National Park.

== Brumbies ==
In late 2018 and early 2019, during a nationwide drought, news reports began circulating about starving brumbies across Australia, including in Kosciuszko National Park, Guy Fawkes River National Park, and Barmah National Park. At Barmah, which at the time was flooded with environmental water, local activists the Barmah Brumby Preservation Group began feeding feral horses on properties adjacent to the national park. Within Barmah National Park, Parks Victoria began euthanising feral horses in very poor condition, under strict protocols, by shooting.

In April 2019, Parks Victoria announced a four year plan to cull an estimated more than 500 feral horses within the national park, along with controlling and eradicating other introduced plants and animals. Removal of 100–250 feral horses per year from the national park is proposed, with passive trapping and rehoming of some feral horses if homes can be pre-arranged, and the remainder to be shot by contracted professional shooters. After the fourth year, the plan will be reassessed, with the ultimate aim of removal of all feral horses from the national park.

Parks Victoria has stated that horses are not allowed in the national park under the Victorian National Parks Act 1975 (Vic) and that they are obliged to remove them under the Environmental Protection and Biodiversity Conservation (EPBC) Act 1999 (Cth) and the Flora and Fauna Guarantee Act 1988 (Vic). A spokesman stated that "difficult choices need to be made to reduce the severe degradation to the significant environmental values of Barmah National Park, and to address the animal welfare risks created by a burgeoning feral horse population that the park cannot sustain."

The local activists have disputed Parks Victoria's estimations of large numbers of feral horses within the national park, and opposed the rehoming or culling of any horses, stating that environmental flooding rather than overpopulation was responsible for the problems with the feral horses in the national park.

== See also ==
- Barmah Forest virus
- Protected areas of Victoria
- List of national parks of Australia
