= Lower Moira =

- Town
- Coordinates: 36°06′13″S 145°00′13″E
- Country: Australia
- State: Victoria
- Region: Hume
- LGA: Shire of Moira

Government
  - State electorate: Shepparton
  - Federal division: Nicholls

Population
  - Total: 25 (2016)
- Postcode: 3639
Localities around Lower Moira
New South Wales	Barmah	Picola
New South Wales	Lower Moira	Picola
Kanyapella	Yambuna	Wyuna

Lower Moira is a locality in northern Victoria, Australia. The locality is in the south-west part of Shire of Moira. Lower Moira is mostly farmland. To the west is the New South Wales border.

The post office there opened in 1902, closed in 1930, reopened on 12 September 1938 and closed on 19 February 1953.
