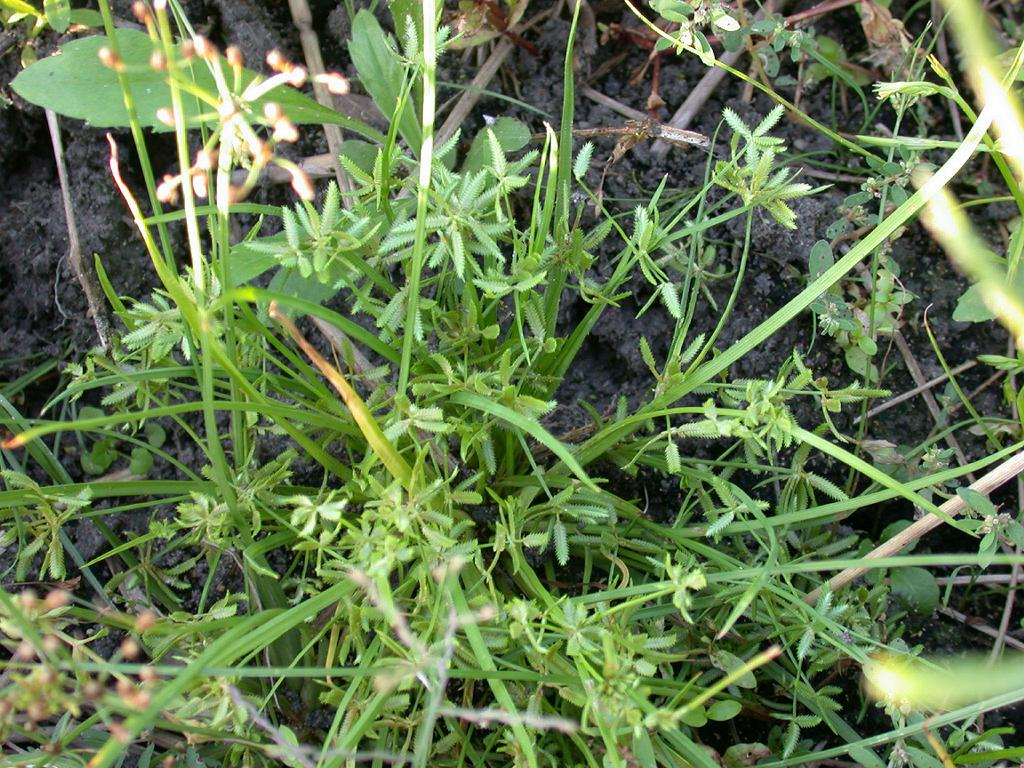

Scientific classification
- Kingdom: Plantae
- Clade: Tracheophytes
- Clade: Angiosperms
- Clade: Monocots
- Clade: Commelinids
- Order: Poales
- Family: Cyperaceae
- Genus: Cyperus
- Species: C. flaccidus

Binomial name
- Cyperus flaccidus R.Br.

= Cyperus flaccidus =

Species of plant

Cyperus flaccidus is a sedge of the family Cyperaceae that is native to Australia.

== Description ==
The annual grass like sedge typically grows to a height of 0.1 to 0.2 metres (0.33 to 0.66 ft). It blooms between May and April producing green flowers.

The leaves are 1 to 2 mm (0.039 to 0.079 in) wide, and are often reduced to sheaths and much shorter than the culms. The simple head-like inflorescences have between three and seven branches and are around 8 cm (3.1 in) in length. The digitate clusters to have a diameter of around 15 mm (0.59 in) with leaf-like bracts the lowest of which is erect and looks like a continuation of the culm and has alength exceeding that of the inflorescence. There are two to eight flattened spikelets cluster containing 20 flowers. After flowering a broad ovoid shaped brown nut will form that is 0.5 mm (0.020 in) in length with a diameter of about 0.3 mm (0.012 in).

== Taxonomy ==
The species was first formally described by the botanist Robert Brown in 1810 as part of the work Prodromus florae Novae Hollandiae et insulae Van-Diemen, exhibens characteres plantarum quas annis 1802-1805. The two known synonyms are; Cyperus trinervis var. flaccidus and Cyperus macellus.

== Distribution ==
It is endemic to the eastern states of Australia where it has a scattered distribution throughout eastern Queensland and New South Wales, western Victoria and eastern South Australia. It has small isolated populations in the Northern Territory and the Kimberley region of Western Australia. It is mostly situated in creek beds and other damp areas.

== See also ==
- List of Cyperus species
