= Murray Valley National Park =

National park in Australia

- IUCN category II (national park)
- Location within New South Wales
- Location: New South Wales
- Nearest city: Mathoura
- Coordinates: 35°47′36″S 145°01′39″E
- Area: 416.01 km^{2} (160.62 sq mi)
- Governing body: NSW National Parks & Wildlife Service

Murray Valley National Park is a national park in the Riverina region of New South Wales, Australia. The national park consists of 41,601 hectares (102,800 acres).

The park consists of several former state forests and together with the Barmah National Park on the Victorian side of the Murray River comprises the largest stand of Red river gum forest in Australia.

The park was established in July 2010 and is administered by the NSW National Parks & Wildlife Service.

This unique ecosystem is a habitat for 60 endangered native animal species and 40 endangered plant species.

Murray Valley National Park is a traditional Aboriginal country and represents a significant cultural and historical heritage.

== Gallery ==
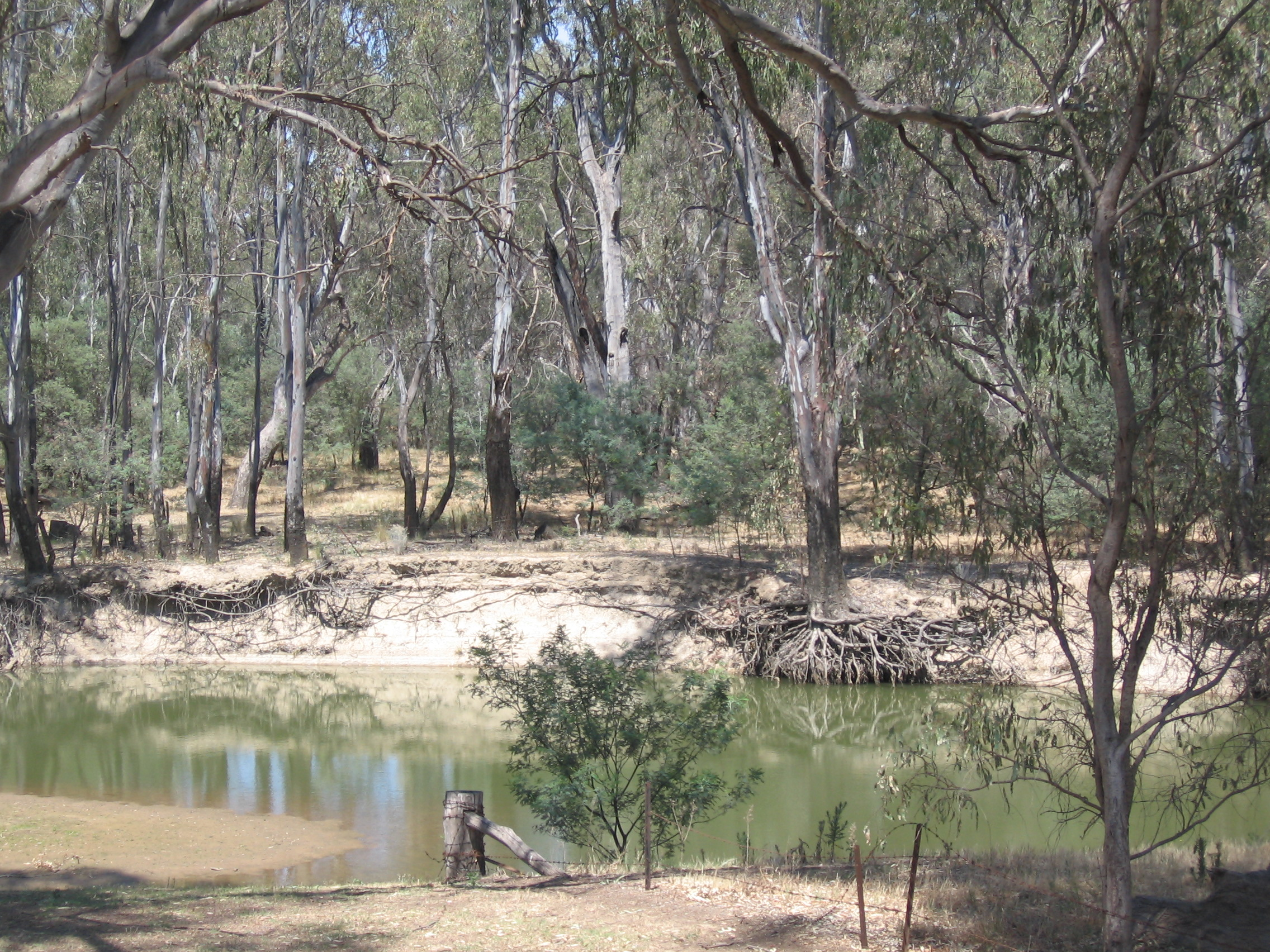
Bullanginya Lagoon

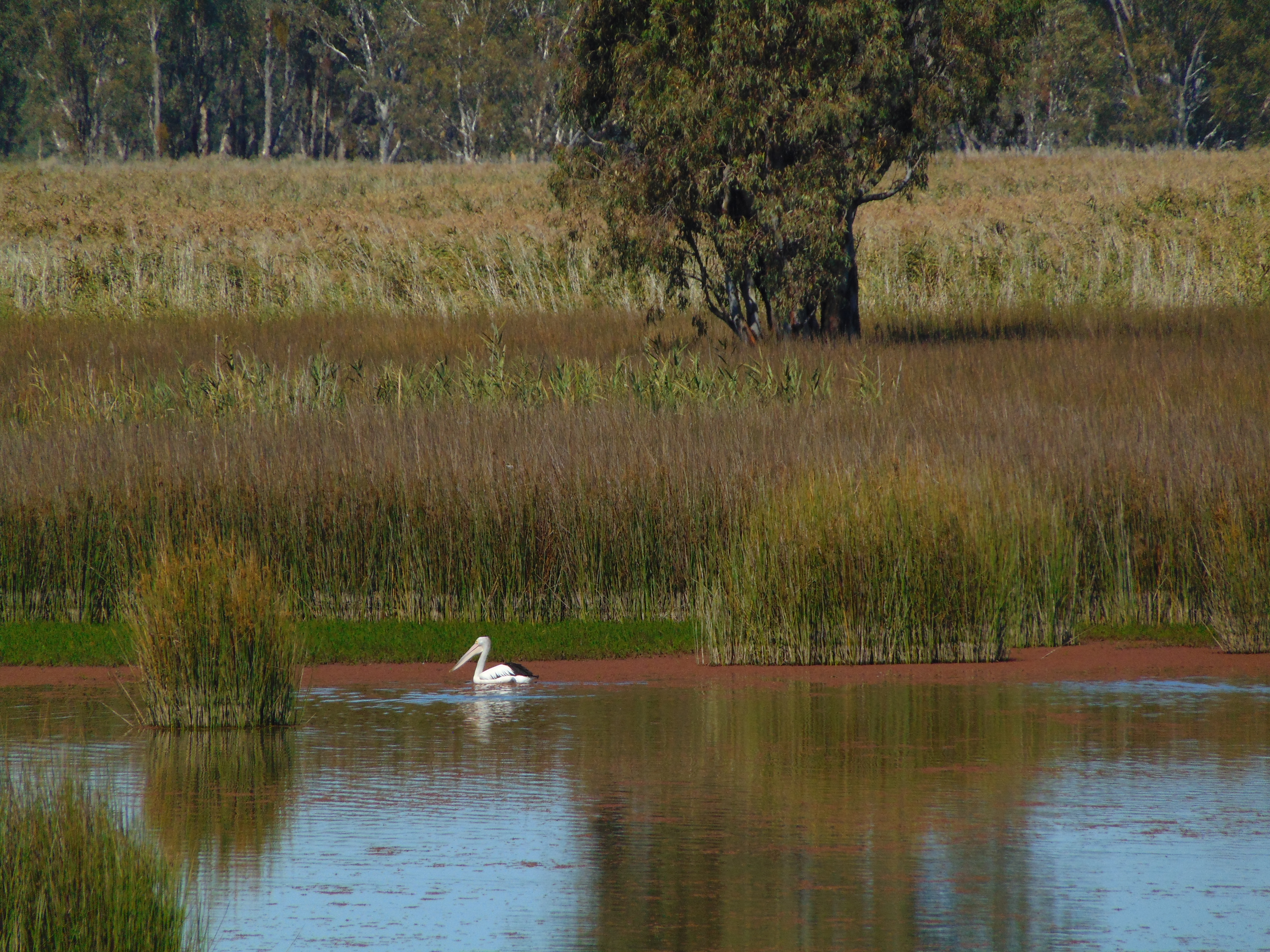
Pelican

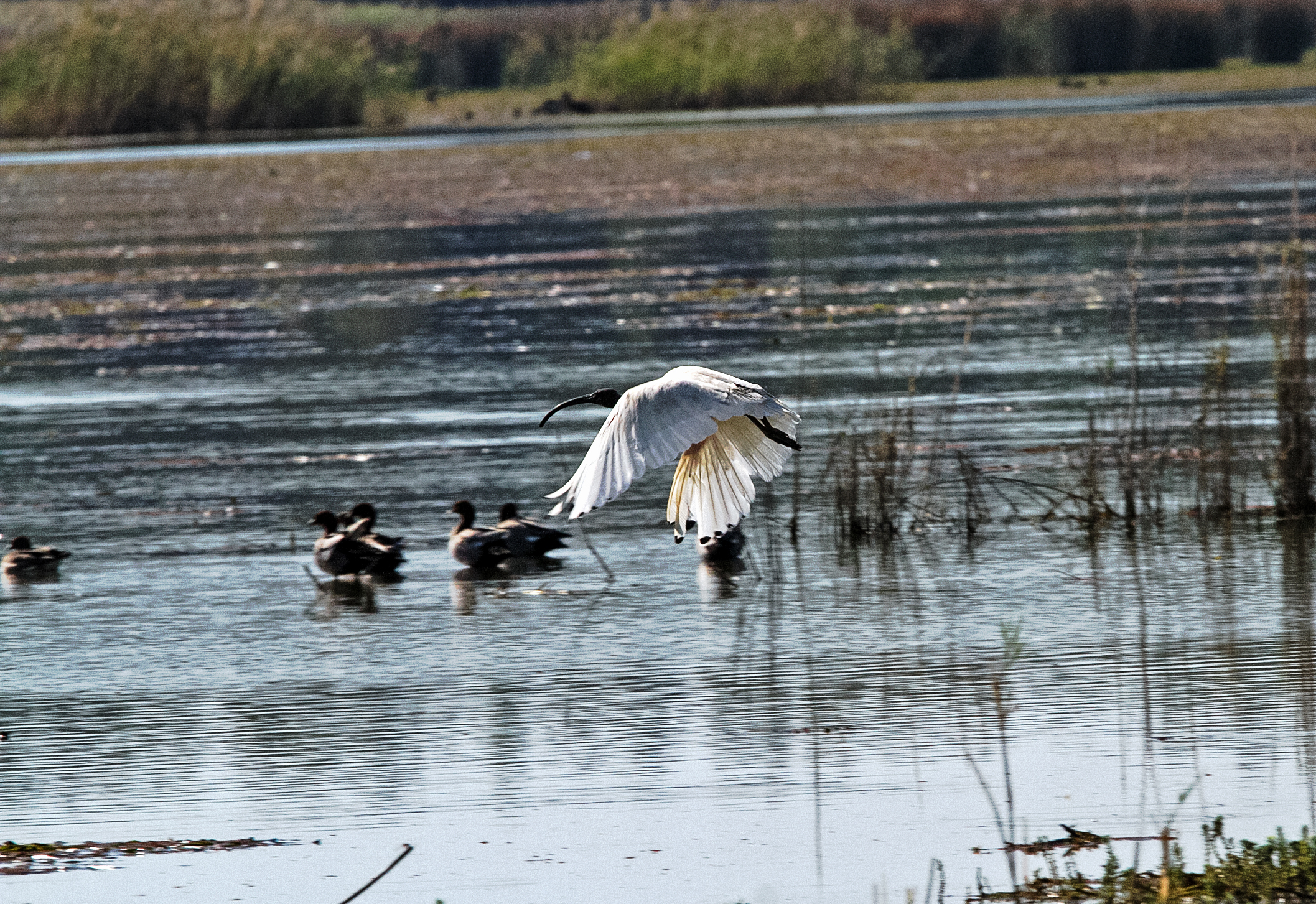
white ibis

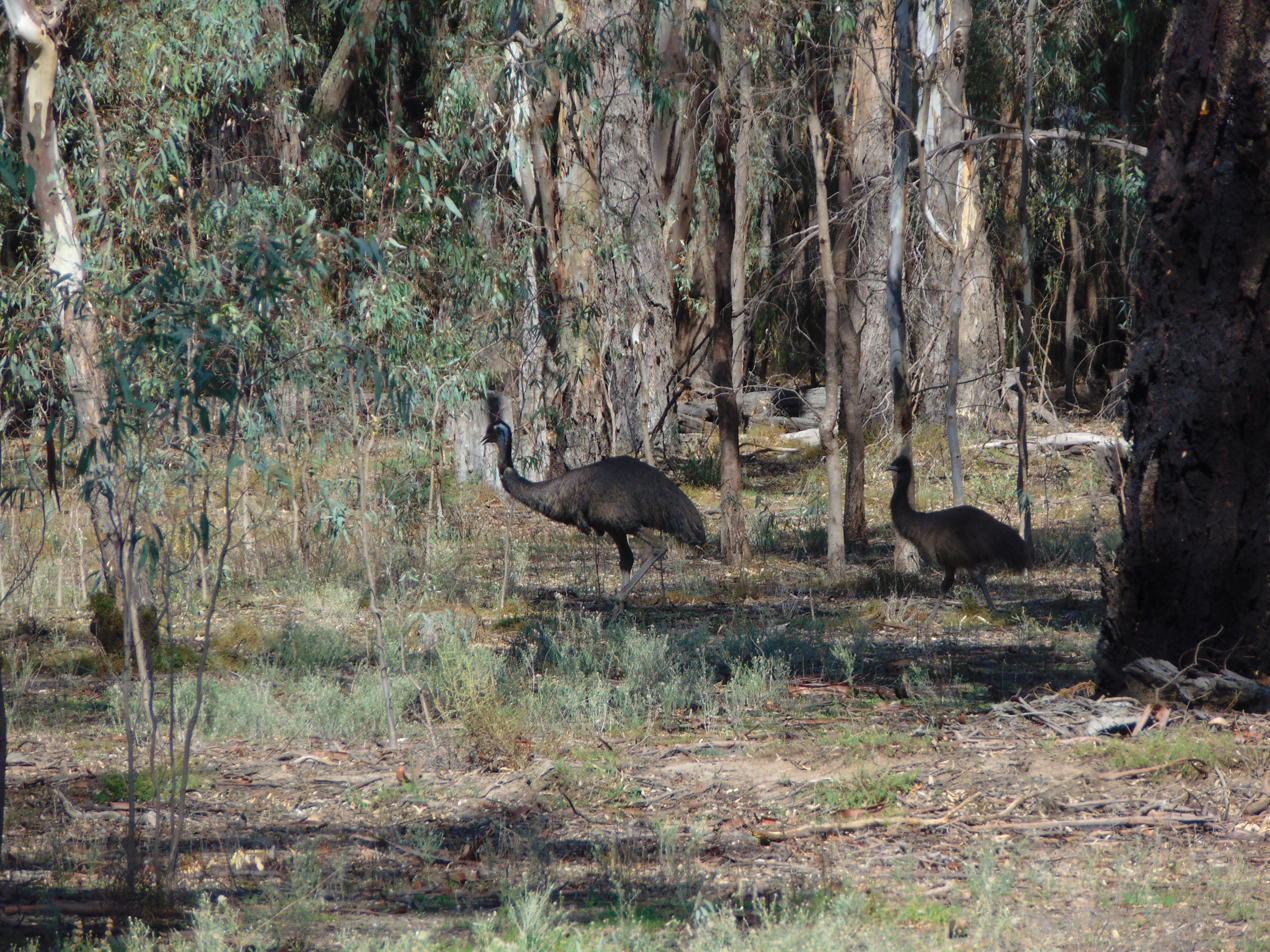
Emus

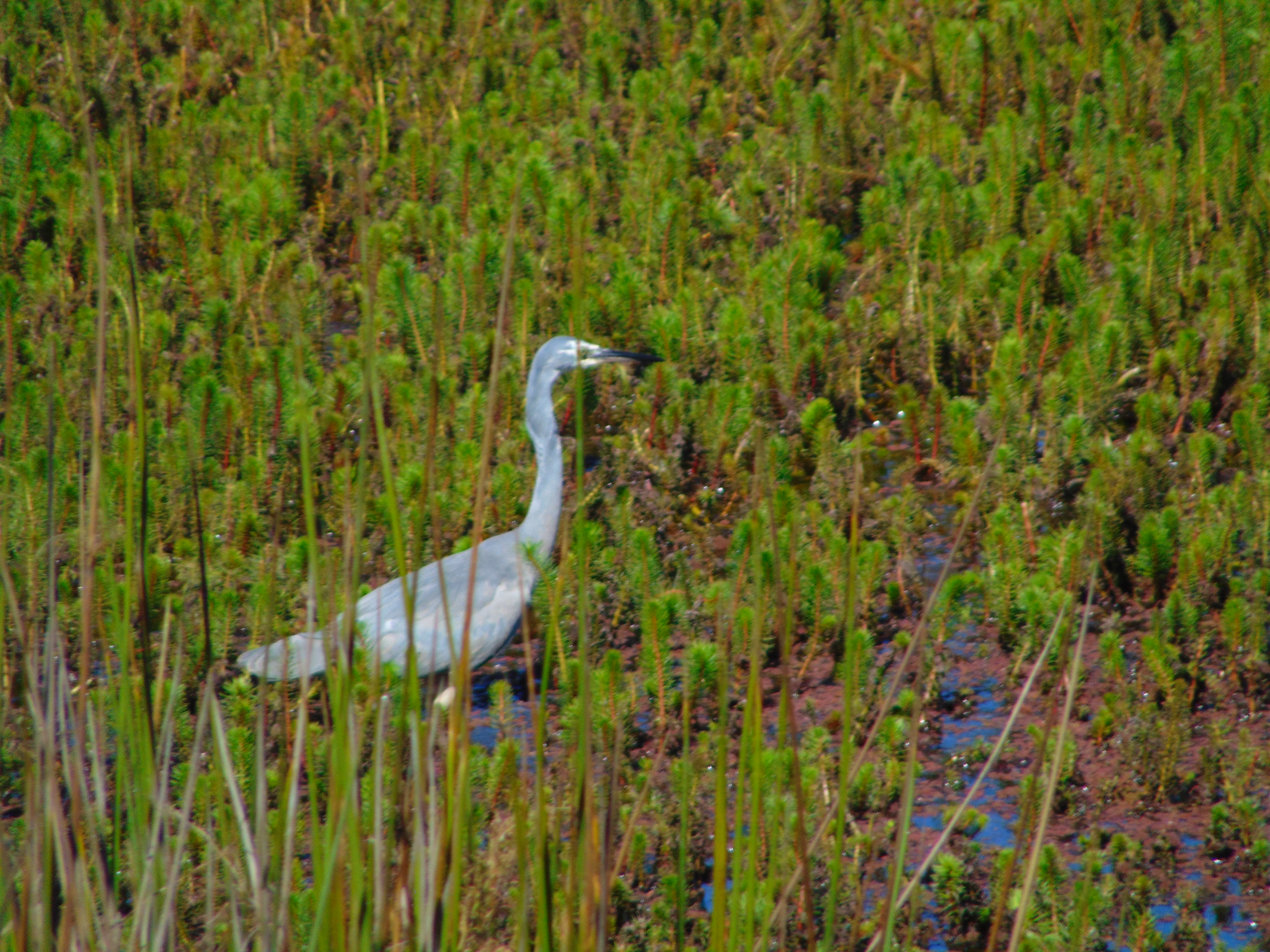
White-faced heron

== See also ==
- Protected areas of New South Wales
- Barmah National Park
