= Ulupna Island =

River island, Victoria

Coordinates: 35.83°S 145.46°E

Ulupna Island, a river island, lies at the eastern end of Barmah National Park which is a part of the largest river red gum forest in Victoria, Australia. The island is bounded by the Murray River and its anabranch, Ulupna Creek. Ulupna Island is part of the flood plain of the Murray River.

== Location and features ==
Ulupna Island is located in Northern Victoria, with the nearest town being Strathmerton. The island is popular as a camping destination and is rich in wildlife, with many goannas, eastern grey kangaroos and koalas visible all year.

== Ulupna Island Flora Reserve ==
In 1991, 340 hectares (840 acres) of the western part of the island was heritage listed as Ulupna Island Flora Reserve, a place of natural significance on the former Register of the National Estate. In 2010, the Ulupna Island Flora Reserve became part of Barmah National Park.

The vegetation of the reserve is mainly river red gum (Eucalyptus camaldulensis) open forest.

This area is very rich in plant species, including two rare or threatened species - the Mueller daisy (Brachyscome muelleroides) and Reader's daisy (Brachyscome readeri). Ulupna is important for the Mueller daisy because of its restricted distribution in Victoria.

Ulupna also provides important habitat for two threatened woodland birds, the grey-crowned babbler (Pomatostomus temporalis) and the superb parrot (Polytelis swainsonii). The grey-crowned babblers are a species that was once common in the woodlands of south-eastern Australia, Ulupna also provides habitat for superb parrots at the southern end of their range.

Unlike most of the Barmah forest, Ulupna Reserve has not been extensively grazed or logged, and provides an important reference area for studies of the impacts of these activities on other red gum forests in the region. Ulupna also contains an excellent example of river red gum (Eucalyptus camaldulensis) open forest.
