= Adam Kingsley =

Australian rules footballer (born 1975)

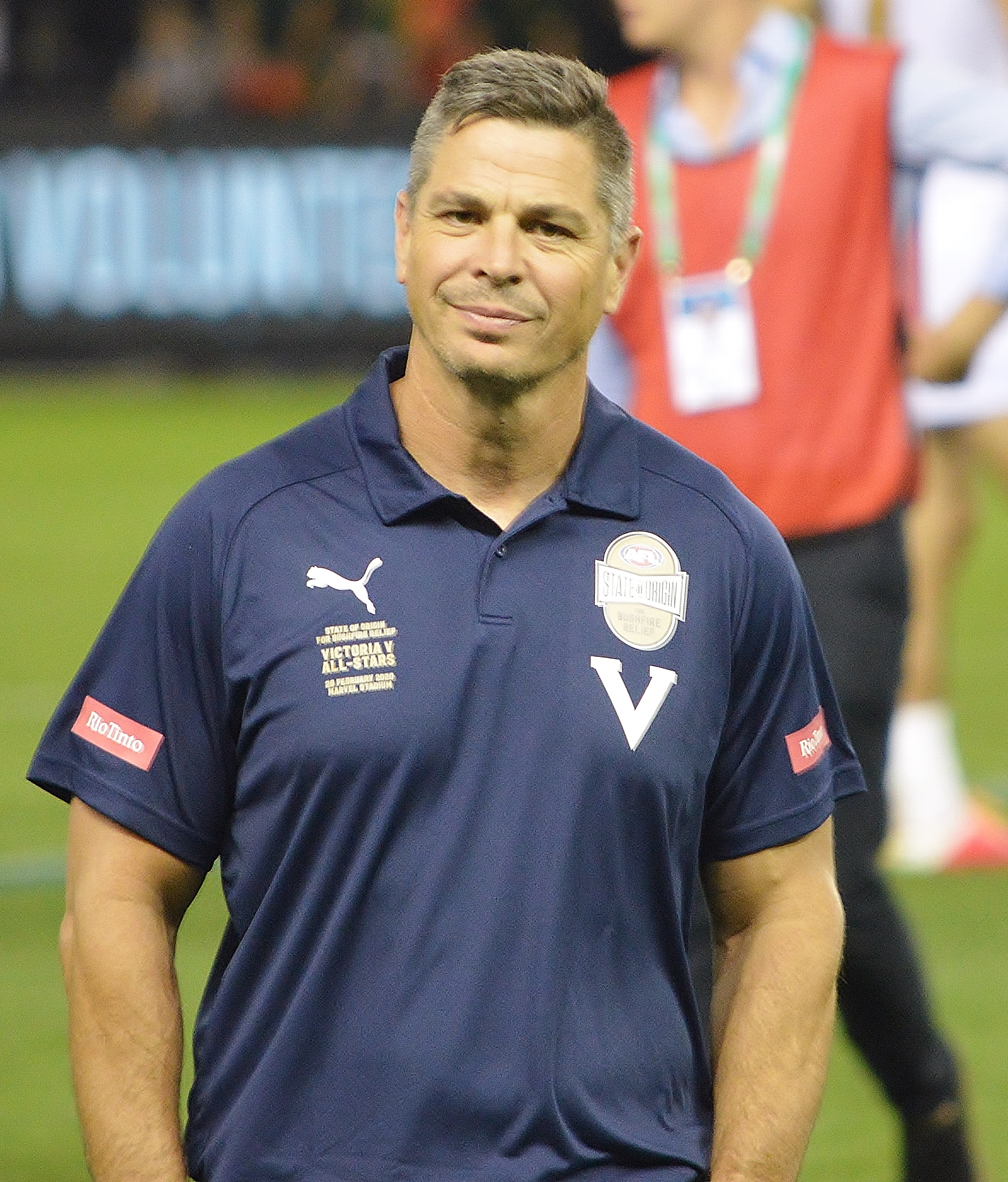
- Kingsley in February 2020

Personal information
- Full name: Adam Kingsley
- Born: 20 August 1975 (age 51)
- Original team: Eastern Ranges (TAC Cup)
- Draft: No. 37, 1996 national draft
- Height: 183 cm (6 ft 0 in)
- Weight: 83 kg (183 lb)
- Position: Defender / Midfielder

Playing career^{1}
Years	Club	Games (Goals)
1997–2006	Port Adelaide	170 (47)

Coaching career^{3}
Years	Club	Games (W–L–D)
2023–	Greater Western Sydney	87 (52–35–0)
- ^{1} Playing statistics correct to the end of 2006.^{3} Coaching statistics correct as of round 12, 2026.

Career highlights
- AFL premiership: 2004; John Cahill Medal: 1998; 2× AFL Pre-Season Premiership: 2001, 2002; Michael Tuck Medal: 2001; AFLCA Coach of the Year: 2023

Adam Kingsley (born 20 August 1975) is a former Australian rules footballer and current senior coach of the Greater Western Sydney Giants in the Australian Football League (AFL). Kingsley was a premiership player for Port Adelaide, before spending time as an assistant coach at St Kilda and Richmond.

== Playing career ==
=== Port Adelaide ===
Originally from Eastern Ranges, he was playing for the Essendon Football Club's reserves team, before being recruited by Port Adelaide. Debuting in the Port Adelaide Football Club's inaugural 1997 AFL side, Kingsley was known as a consistent defender/midfielder.

He struggled in 2003, coming close to being delisted, but improved his form and cemented a spot during 2004, being a premiership player that year after working his way back into the side.

2005 saw another consistent season from Kingsley, however, he played just five games in 2006, which cast doubts over his career. In his fifth game in Round 22, he injured his anterior cruciate ligament, which forced his retirement. He said in The Age on 12 September 2006, that he had hoped to continue playing in 2007 before the injury.

Kingsley played a total of 170 games and kicked a total of 47 goals for Port Adelaide from 1997 until 2006, and was a member of the Port Adelaide premiership side in 2004.

== Coaching career ==
=== Assistant coaching (2007–2022) ===
In 2007, Kingsley became an assistant coach at Port Adelaide, a position in which he stayed in until the end of 2010. He then joined St Kilda at the end of the 2010 season as an assistant coach, staying at the club until 2018 before joining Richmond as an assistant coach in 2019.

=== Greater Western Sydney senior coach (2023–present) ===
Kingsley was appointed senior coach of Greater Western Sydney on 22 August 2022. Kingsley replaced GWS caretaker senior coach Mark McVeigh, who coached the Giants after Leon Cameron stepped down in the middle of the 2022 season.

His first match in charge, in round one, 2023, saw the Giants come from 31 points down to defeat Adelaide by 16 points, while losing three players to game-ending injuries, in a match played in 36-degree heat. Despite having a win-loss record of 3-7 after round 10, the Giants won 8 of their last 10 matches to finish seventh and earn Kingsley a finals berth in his first year as coach. The Giants defeated St Kilda by 24 points in an elimination final at the Melbourne Cricket Ground, in what was also the club's first final at the ground since the 2019 Grand Final; this was followed by a win over Port Adelaide by 23 points at Adelaide Oval which saw them advance to a preliminary final where they eventually lost to Collingwood by one point at the MCG. At the end of the season, Kingsley was named coach of the year by the AFL Coaches Association.

== Media work ==
In March 2006, Kingsley won Australia's Brainiest Footballer, a Network Ten quiz show special. He donated the $20,000 that he won to the McGuinness-McDermott Foundation (run by former Adelaide footballers Tony McGuinness and Chris McDermott).

== Statistics ==
=== Playing statistics ===
Legend
G	Goals	K	Kicks	D	Disposals	T	Tackles
B	Behinds	H	Handballs	M	Marks
#	Played in that season's premiership team

Season	Team	No.	Games	Totals							Averages (per game)							Votes
Season	Team	No.	Games	G	B	K	H	D	M	T	G	B	K	H	D	M	T	Votes
1997	Port Adelaide	29	12	2	4	114	69	183	40	9	0.2	0.3	9.5	5.8	15.3	3.3	0.8	0
1998	Port Adelaide	29	22	10	9	275	131	406	82	32	0.5	0.4	12.5	6.0	18.5	3.7	1.5	0
1999	Port Adelaide	29	23	3	5	310	125	435	71	26	0.1	0.2	13.5	5.4	18.9	3.1	1.1	8
2000	Port Adelaide	29	15	4	6	187	52	239	56	18	0.3	0.4	12.5	3.5	15.9	3.7	1.2	0
2001	Port Adelaide	29	21	0	1	236	126	362	117	29	0.0	0.0	11.2	6.0	17.2	5.6	1.4	0
2002	Port Adelaide	29	20	5	1	216	114	330	67	21	0.3	0.1	10.8	5.7	16.5	3.4	1.1	0
2003	Port Adelaide	29	12	1	1	112	55	167	51	18	0.1	0.1	9.3	4.6	13.9	4.3	1.5	3
2004^{#}	Port Adelaide	29	19	8	2	203	111	314	92	32	0.4	0.1	10.7	5.8	16.5	4.8	1.7	4
2005	Port Adelaide	29	21	14	5	264	121	385	102	36	0.7	0.2	12.6	5.8	18.3	4.9	1.7	0
2006	Port Adelaide	29	5	0	1	40	20	60	15	6	0.0	0.2	8.0	4.0	12.0	3.0	1.2	0
Career			170	47	35	1957	924	2881	693	227	0.3	0.2	11.5	5.4	16.9	4.1	1.3	15

=== Coaching statistics ===
Statistics are correct to the end of 2024.

Team	Year	Home and Away Season					Finals			
Team	Year	Won	Lost	Drew	Win %	Position	Won	Lost	Win %	Result
GWS	2023	13	10	0	.565	7th out of 18	2	1	.667	Lost to Collingwood in Preliminary Final
GWS	2024	15	8	0	.652	4th out of 18	0	2	.000	Lost to Brisbane in Semi Final
GWS	2025	16	7	0	.696	5th out of 18	0	1	.000	Lost to Hawthorn in Elimination Final
Total		44	25	0	.638		2	4	.334	
