= Tom Warhurst =

Tom Warhurst may refer to:

- Tom Warhurst Sr. (1917–2004), Australian tennis player and Norwood footballer
- Tom Warhurst Jr. (born 1963), Australian rules footballer for Norwood and Adelaide
