= 2023 AFL season =

127th season of the Australian Football League (AFL)

2023 AFL premiership season

Overview
- Date: 16 March – 30 September 2023
- Teams: 18
- Premiers: Collingwood; 16th premiership
- Runners-up: Brisbane Lions; 2nd runners-up result
- Minor premiers: Collingwood; 20th minor premiership
- Brownlow Medallist: Lachie Neale (Brisbane Lions); 31 votes
- Coleman Medallist: Charlie Curnow (Carlton); 78 goals

Attendance
- Matches played: 216
- Total attendance: 8,139,464 (37,683 per match)
- Highest (H&A): 95,179 (round 6, Collingwood v Essendon)
- Highest (finals): 100,024 (grand final, Collingwood v Brisbane Lions)

The 2023 AFL season was the 127th season of the Australian Football League (AFL), the highest-level senior Australian rules football competition in Australia. The season featured 18 clubs and ran from 16 March to 30 September, comprising a 23-match home-and-away season followed by a four-week finals series featuring the top eight clubs.

Collingwood won the premiership, defeating the Brisbane Lions by four points in the 2023 AFL Grand Final; it was Collingwood's 16th VFL/AFL premiership. Collingwood also won the minor premiership by finishing atop the home-and-away ladder with an 18–5 win–loss record. The Brisbane Lions' Lachie Neale won his second Brownlow Medal as the league's best and fairest player, and Carlton's Charlie Curnow won his second consecutive Coleman Medal as the league's leading goalkicker.

== Background ==
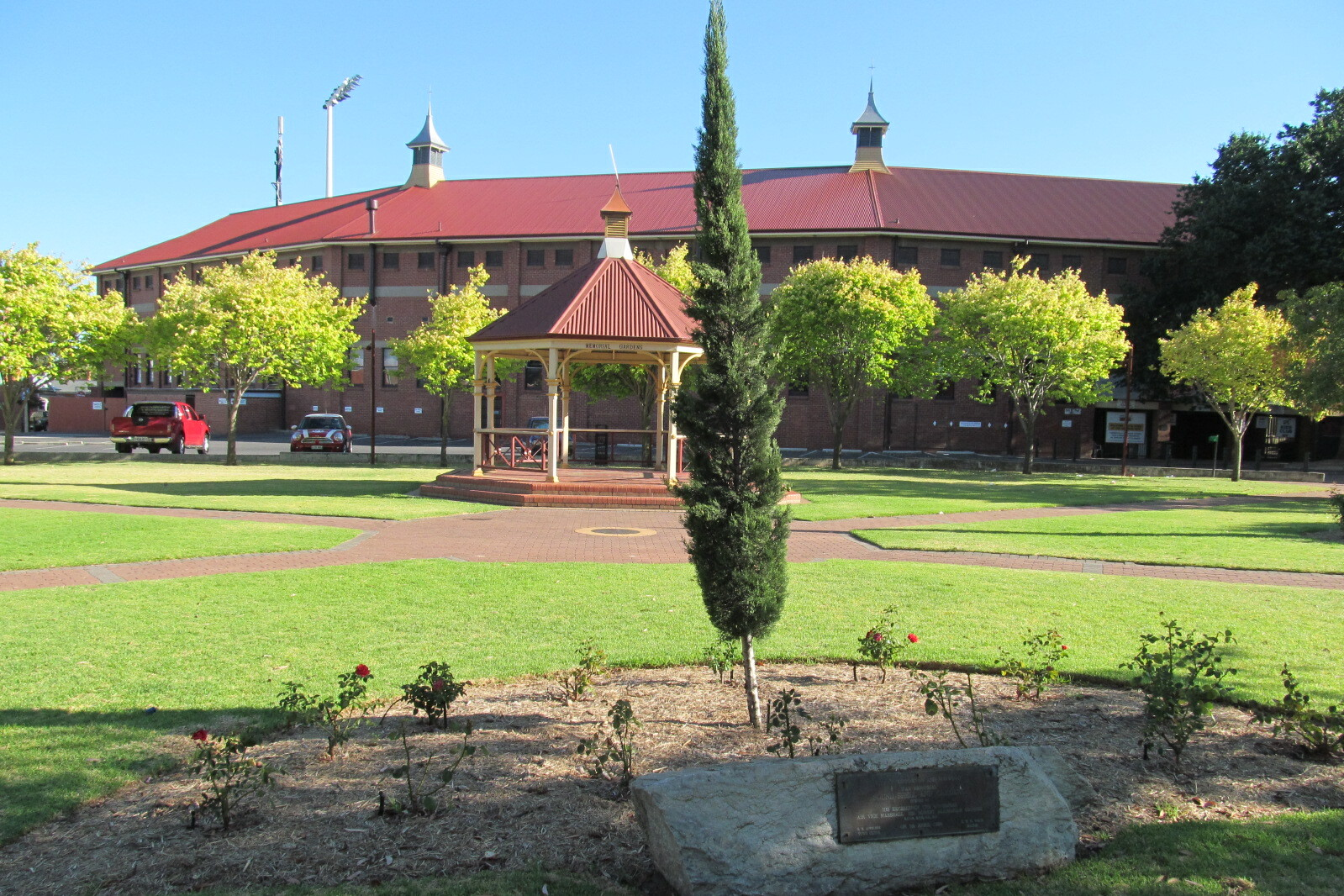
Norwood Oval hosted two matches during the inaugural Gather Round in 2023.

The fixture was extended to 23 matches per club, the longest in history, to accommodate the introduction of Gather Round, a special round featuring all 18 clubs playing in the same city and its surrounds; this was modelled on the National Rugby League (NRL)'s Magic Round, which had scheduled annually since 2019. South Australia won the bid for the event, beating a bid from New South Wales, and Norwood Oval and Summit Sports Park in Mount Barker each hosted their first AFL matches.

The following rule changes were made for the 2023 season:

- The number of field umpires in control of each match was increased from three to four.
- The medical substitute position, which had been introduced in 2021, was replaced with a tactical substitute; prior rules had allowed for a player to be substituted only for medical reasons, but this stipulation was removed, allowing for the substitute to be used for any reason.

== Coach appointments ==
New coach	Club	Date of appointment	Previous coach	Ref.
Alastair Clarkson	North Melbourne	19 August 2022	David Noble	
Adam Kingsley	Greater Western Sydney	22 August 2022	Leon Cameron	
Brad Scott	Essendon	29 September 2022	Ben Rutten	
Ross Lyon	St Kilda	24 October 2022	Brett Ratten	

== Club leadership ==
Caretaker coaches are italicised.

Club	Coach	Leadership group		
Club	Coach	Captain(s)	Vice-captain(s)	Other leader(s)
Adelaide	Matthew Nicks	Jordan Dawson		Tom Doedee, Ben Keays, Reilly O'Brien, Brodie Smith
Brisbane Lions	Chris Fagan	Harris Andrews, Lachie Neale	Hugh McCluggage	Jarrod Berry, Charlie Cameron, Josh Dunkley, Jack Gunston, Ryan Lester, Lincoln McCarthy, Oscar McInerney, Daniel Rich
Carlton	Michael Voss	Patrick Cripps	Sam Walsh, Jacob Weitering	
Collingwood	Craig McRae	Darcy Moore		Taylor Adams, Jeremy Howe, Brayden Maynard
Essendon	Brad Scott	Zach Merrett	Andrew McGrath	
Fremantle	Justin Longmuir	Alex Pearce	Andrew Brayshaw, Caleb Serong	Jaeger O'Meara, Sam Switkowski, Hayden Young
Geelong	Chris Scott	Patrick Dangerfield	Tom Stewart	
Gold Coast	Stuart Dew (r. 1–17); Steven King (r. 18–24)	Touk Miller, Jarrod Witts	Sam Collins	Noah Anderson, Nick Holman, Sean Lemmens, David Swallow
Greater Western Sydney	Adam Kingsley	Toby Greene	Stephen Coniglio, Josh Kelly	Tom Green, Connor Idun, Harry Perryman, Sam Taylor
Hawthorn	Sam Mitchell	James Sicily	Luke Breust, Dylan Moore	Sam Frost, Jarman Impey, Mitch Lewis
Melbourne	Simon Goodwin	Max Gawn	Jack Viney	
North Melbourne	Alastair Clarkson (r. 1–9, 21–24); Brett Ratten (r. 10–20)	Luke McDonald, Jy Simpkin		Ben Cunnington, Nick Larkey, Ben McKay, Jack Ziebell
Port Adelaide	Ken Hinkley	Tom Jonas	Ollie Wines	Darcy Byrne-Jones
Richmond	Damien Hardwick (r. 1–10); Andrew McQualter (r. 11–24)	Dylan Grimes, Toby Nankervis		
St Kilda	Ross Lyon	Jack Steele	Callum Wilkie	Tim Membrey, Seb Ross, Jack Sinclair
Sydney	John Longmire	Callum Mills, Luke Parker, Dane Rampe		Lance Franklin, Will Hayward, Isaac Heeney, Jake Lloyd, Tom Papley
West Coast	Adam Simpson	Luke Shuey	Tom Barrass, Jeremy McGovern	
Western Bulldogs	Luke Beveridge	Marcus Bontempelli	Jack Macrae	Caleb Daniel, Taylor Duryea, Aaron Naughton

== Pre-season ==
All starting times are local time. Source: afl.com.au

	Official practice matches
Thursday, 2 March (5:10 pm)	Hawthorn 14.16 (100)	def. by	Collingwood 15.16 (106)	University of Tasmania Stadium	Report
Thursday, 2 March (4:10 pm)	Fremantle 13.14 (92)	def.	Port Adelaide 8.13 (61)	Fremantle Community Bank Oval	Report
Thursday, 2 March (7:10 pm)	Brisbane Lions 13.13 (91)	def.	Geelong 6.9 (45)	Brighton Homes Arena	Report
Friday, 3 March (4:10 pm)	St Kilda 10.7 (67)	def.	Essendon 3.14 (32)	RSEA Park	Report
Friday, 3 March (7:10 pm)	Sydney 15.7 (97)	def.	Carlton 7.12 (54)	Blacktown ISP Oval	Report
Friday, 3 March (4:40 pm)	West Coast 7.10 (52)	def. by	Adelaide 17.9 (111)	Mineral Resources Park	Report
Saturday, 4 March (12:10 pm)	Greater Western Sydney 19.8 (122)	def.	Gold Coast 12.5 (77)	Blacktown ISP Oval	Report
Saturday, 4 March (1:10 pm)	Western Bulldogs 22.11 (143)	def.	North Melbourne 13.7 (85)	Ikon Park	Report
Saturday, 4 March (4:10 pm)	Melbourne 18.13 (121)	def.	Richmond 10.11 (71)	Casey Fields	Report

== Season events ==
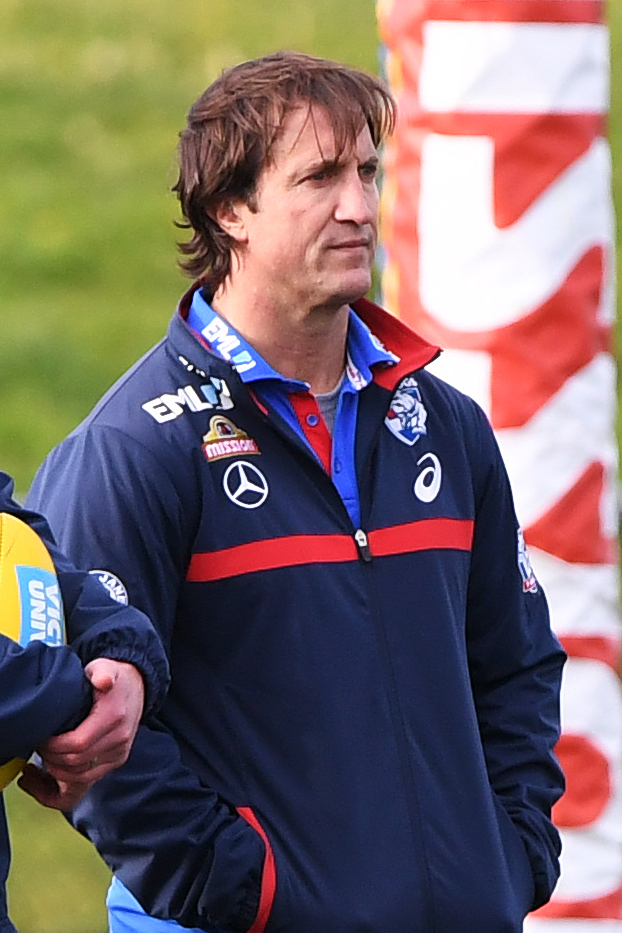
Western Bulldogs coach Luke Beveridge avoided showing his players an AFL memo on dangerous tackles.

=== Increased focus on dangerous tackles ===
The season saw the AFL focus more heavily on dangerous tackles and head contact amidst an increased focus worldwide on the effects of concussion in sport and a class action lodged against the league in March, headed by a group of former players seeking compensation for damage sustained from concussion-related injuries during their VFL/AFL careers. Several players received suspensions during the season for tackles of a slinging motion which would not have previously been scrutinised by the AFL's match review officer, with many of these players trying unsuccessfully to appeal their suspensions at the AFL Tribunal. St Kilda coach Ross Lyon suggested during the season that other tackling-related rule interpretations may need to change as a result of the increased focus and suspensions, while Sydney coach John Longmire said that the crackdown "[asked] a hell of a lot from our players [...] it's no surprise that it's not right all the time".

In April, players such as Dylan Shiel, Andrew McGrath and Darcy Moore called for greater clarification around rules for dangerous tackles, leading the AFL to send memos to all clubs emphasising the elements constituting a dangerous tackle and the factoring of potential to cause injury in grading of suspensions; Western Bulldogs coach Luke Beveridge admitted that he chose not to show his team the memo to avoid "[telling] the players to go out and avoid accidents".

=== Hawthorn historical racism allegations ===
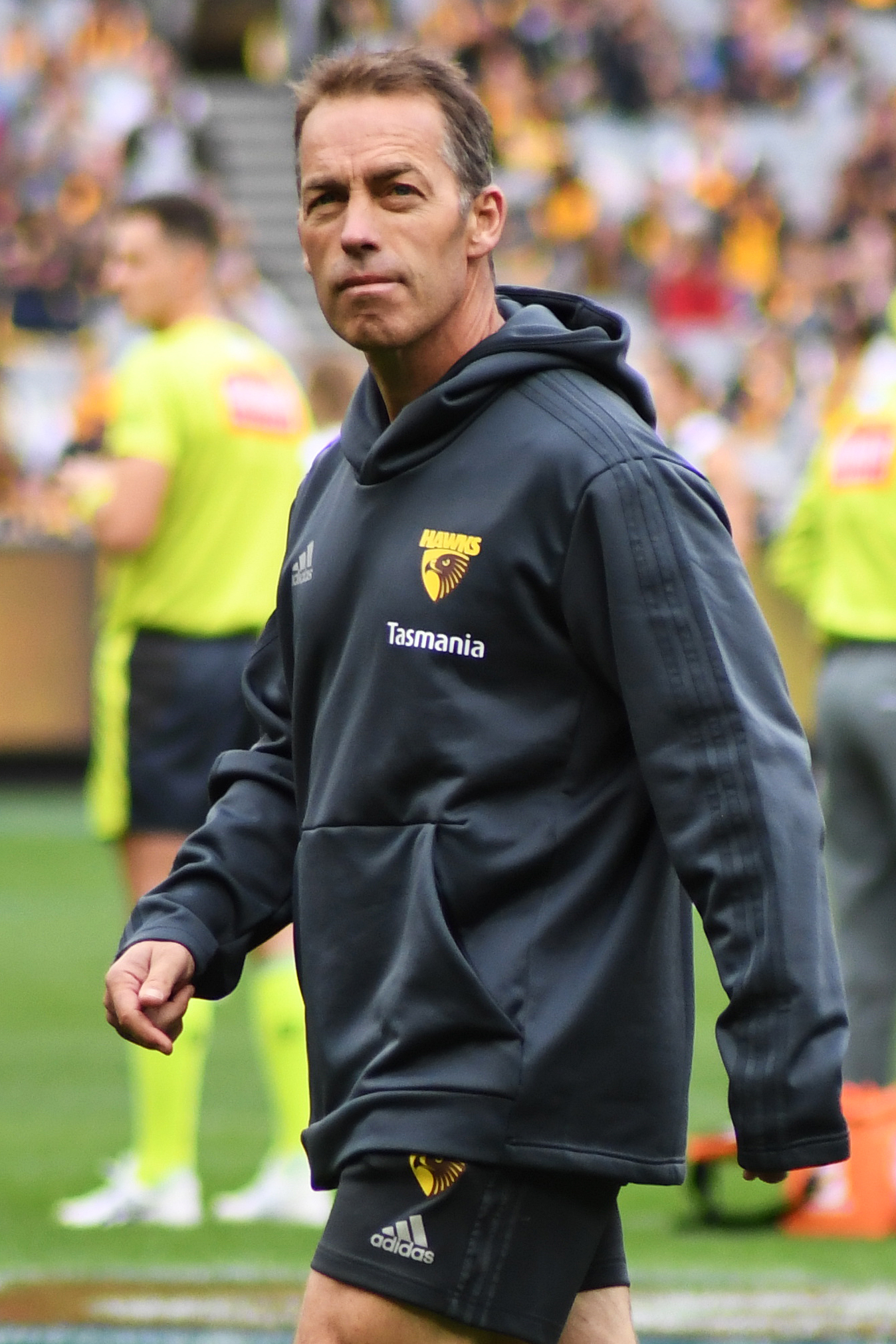
Former Hawthorn coach Alastair Clarkson took leave from coaching to focus on his wellbeing during the season.

In May, the AFL's investigation into historical racism allegations against the Hawthorn Football Club saw new North Melbourne coach Alastair Clarkson, who was coach of Hawthorn during the period being investigated, take an indefinite leave from coaching during the week leading up to what would have been his 400th game as an AFL coach to focus on his physical and emotional wellbeing, with assistant coach Brett Ratten filling in during his absence; Clarkson eventually returned as coach in round 21, coaching his 400th game in the process. Hawthorn chief executive officer Justin Reeves also resigned from his role in May, citing mental health reasons. A few days later, the AFL announced that the eight-month investigation had concluded without any findings being made or any charges brought against Clarkson and former Hawthorn officials Chris Fagan (Brisbane Lions coach at the time of the investigation) and Jason Burt, but implied that it could still take action against Hawthorn for its handling of the report that formed the basis of the investigation.

In June, following the conclusion of the AFL's investigation, six of the complainants, including former Hawthorn player Cyril Rioli and his wife, publicly identified themselves in an open letter confirming that they planned to take their case to the Australian Human Rights Commission.

== Home-and-away season ==
All starting times are local time. Source: AFL Tables

=== Round 1 ===
	Round 1 (Opening Round)
Thursday, 16 March (7:20 pm)	Richmond 8.10 (58)	drew with	Carlton 8.10 (58)	Melbourne Cricket Ground (crowd: 88,084)	Report; Stats
Friday, 17 March (7:40 pm)	Geelong 16.7 (103)	def. by	Collingwood 19.11 (125)	Melbourne Cricket Ground (crowd: 86,595)	Report; Stats
Saturday, 18 March (1:45 pm)	North Melbourne 12.15 (87)	def.	West Coast 12.10 (82)	Marvel Stadium (crowd: 21,274)	Report; Stats
Saturday, 18 March (4:05 pm)	Port Adelaide 18.18 (126)	def.	Brisbane Lions 11.6 (72)	Adelaide Oval (crowd: 34,255)	Report; Stats
Saturday, 18 March (7:25 pm)	Melbourne 17.13 (115)	def.	Western Bulldogs 9.11 (65)	Melbourne Cricket Ground (crowd: 48,103)	Report; Stats
Saturday, 18 March (7:00 pm)	Gold Coast 9.7 (61)	def. by	Sydney 16.14 (110)	Heritage Bank Stadium (crowd: 13,648)	Report; Stats
Sunday, 19 March (1:10 pm)	Greater Western Sydney 15.16 (106)	def.	Adelaide 12.18 (90)	Giants Stadium (crowd: 8,169)	Report; Stats
Sunday, 19 March (3:20 pm)	Hawthorn 9.11 (65)	def. by	Essendon 19.10 (124)	Melbourne Cricket Ground (crowd: 68,691)	Report; Stats
Sunday, 19 March (4:40 pm)	St Kilda 10.7 (67)	def.	Fremantle 7.10 (52)	Marvel Stadium (crowd: 23,429)	Report; Stats
Geelong's loss to Collingwood ended a 16-match winning streak.

=== Round 2 ===
	Round 2
Thursday, 23 March (7:20 pm)	Carlton 13.12 (90)	def.	Geelong 12.10 (82)	Melbourne Cricket Ground (crowd: 55,861)	Report; Stats
Friday, 24 March (6:55 pm)	Brisbane Lions 14.9 (93)	def.	Melbourne 13.4 (82)	The Gabba (crowd: 30,047)	Report; Stats
Saturday, 25 March (1:45 pm)	Collingwood 21.9 (135)	def.	Port Adelaide 9.10 (64)	Melbourne Cricket Ground (crowd: 60,744)	Report; Stats
Saturday, 25 March (4:05 pm)	Adelaide 10.16 (76)	def. by	Richmond 17.6 (108)	Adelaide Oval (crowd: 38,492)	Report; Stats
Saturday, 25 March (7:25 pm)	Western Bulldogs 5.11 (41)	def. by	St Kilda 14.8 (92)	Marvel Stadium (crowd: 33,294)	Report; Stats
Saturday, 25 March (4:30 pm)	Fremantle 10.12 (72)	def. by	North Melbourne 11.7 (73)	Optus Stadium (crowd: 40,487)	Report; Stats
Sunday, 26 March (1:10 pm)	Sydney 17.16 (118)	def.	Hawthorn 4.13 (37)	Sydney Cricket Ground (crowd: 37,052)	Report; Stats
Sunday, 26 March (3:20 pm)	Essendon 16.12 (108)	def.	Gold Coast 11.14 (80)	Marvel Stadium (crowd: 32,915)	Report; Stats
Sunday, 26 March (3:20 pm)	West Coast 14.16 (100)	def.	Greater Western Sydney 11.15 (81)	Optus Stadium (crowd: 44,649)	Report; Stats
A power outage at the Gabba midway through the fourth quarter of the Brisbane Lions v Melbourne match caused play to be suspended for 38 minutes.

=== Round 3 ===
	Round 3
Thursday, 30 March (7:20 pm)	Western Bulldogs 10.7 (67)	def.	Brisbane Lions 7.11 (53)	Marvel Stadium (crowd: 23,665)	Report; Stats
Friday, 31 March (7:50 pm)	Collingwood 8.15 (63)	def.	Richmond 7.7 (49)	Melbourne Cricket Ground (crowd: 85,241)	Report; Stats
Saturday, 1 April (1:45 pm)	Hawthorn 11.14 (80)	def.	North Melbourne 9.7 (61)	University of Tasmania Stadium (crowd: 11,007)	Report; Stats
Saturday, 1 April (4:35 pm)	Greater Western Sydney 9.10 (64)	def. by	Carlton 9.20 (74)	Giants Stadium (crowd: 9,691)	Report; Stats
Saturday, 1 April (7:25 pm)	St Kilda 14.8 (92)	def.	Essendon 11.8 (74)	Melbourne Cricket Ground (crowd: 69,255)	Report; Stats
Saturday, 1 April (7:30 pm)	Port Adelaide 13.8 (86)	def. by	Adelaide 18.9 (117)	Adelaide Oval (crowd: 48,962)	Report; Stats
Sunday, 2 April (2:10 pm)	Gold Coast 10.13 (73)	def.	Geelong 7.12 (54)	Heritage Bank Stadium (crowd: 13,122)	Report; Stats
Sunday, 2 April (3:20 pm)	Melbourne 21.8 (134)	def.	Sydney 12.12 (84)	Melbourne Cricket Ground (crowd: 42,423)	Report; Stats
Sunday, 2 April (3:20 pm)	Fremantle 16.12 (108)	def.	West Coast 9.13 (67)	Optus Stadium (crowd: 56,090)	Report; Stats
St Kilda used its match against Essendon to celebrate the club's 150th anniversary; the crowd of 69,255 is the largest ever crowd for a home-and-away match between the two clubs.

=== Round 4 ===
	Round 4
Thursday, 6 April (7:35 pm)	Brisbane Lions 18.8 (116)	def.	Collingwood 11.17 (83)	The Gabba (crowd: 33,565)	Report; Stats
Friday, 7 April (4:20 pm)	North Melbourne 11.18 (84)	def. by	Carlton 16.11 (107)	Marvel Stadium (crowd: 49,062)	Report; Stats
Saturday, 8 April (1:15 pm)	Adelaide 17.9 (111)	def.	Fremantle 10.12 (72)	Adelaide Oval (crowd: 33,725)	Report; Stats
Saturday, 8 April (4:35 pm)	Richmond 12.12 (84)	def. by	Western Bulldogs 12.17 (89)	Melbourne Cricket Ground (crowd: 56,449)	Report; Stats
Saturday, 8 April (7:30 pm)	Sydney 9.10 (64)	def. by	Port Adelaide 9.12 (66)	Sydney Cricket Ground (crowd: 31,686)	Report; Stats
Saturday, 8 April (7:30 pm)	St Kilda 17.11 (113)	def.	Gold Coast 8.12 (60)	Marvel Stadium (crowd: 21,049)	Report; Stats
Sunday, 9 April (2:10 pm)	Essendon 11.22 (88)	def.	Greater Western Sydney 11.9 (75)	Marvel Stadium (crowd: 28,815)	Report; Stats
Sunday, 9 April (3:20 pm)	West Coast 9.9 (63)	def. by	Melbourne 19.12 (126)	Optus Stadium (crowd: 42,458)	Report; Stats
Monday, 10 April (3:20 pm)	Geelong 19.13 (127)	def.	Hawthorn 6.9 (45)	Melbourne Cricket Ground (crowd: 65,335)	Report; Stats
The crowd of 49,062 for the North Melbourne v Carlton match is the largest ever crowd for a match held on Good Friday.; Oliver Florent (Sydney) had a shot at goal on the final siren to win the match against Port Adelaide, but the ball fell short.

=== Round 5 ===
	Round 5 (Gather Round)
Thursday, 13 April (7:10 pm)	Adelaide 18.10 (118)	def.	Carlton 9.8 (62)	Adelaide Oval (crowd: 47,395)	Report; Stats
Friday, 14 April (4:40 pm)	Gold Coast 13.12 (90)	def. by	Fremantle 15.10 (100)	Norwood Oval (crowd: 9,329)	Report; Stats
Friday, 14 April (7:40 pm)	Sydney 18.14 (122)	def.	Richmond 11.12 (78)	Adelaide Oval (crowd: 42,134)	Report; Stats
Saturday, 15 April (12:40 pm)	North Melbourne 12.5 (77)	def. by	Brisbane Lions 22.20 (152)	Summit Sport and Recreation Park (crowd: 7,329)	Report; Stats
Saturday, 15 April (3:40 pm)	Melbourne 11.11 (77)	def. by	Essendon 15.14 (104)	Adelaide Oval (crowd: 33,832)	Report; Stats
Saturday, 15 April (7:20 pm)	Port Adelaide 10.10 (70)	def.	Western Bulldogs 8.8 (56)	Adelaide Oval (crowd: 45,115)	Report; Stats
Sunday, 16 April (12:40 pm)	West Coast 13.11 (89)	def. by	Geelong 21.10 (136)	Adelaide Oval (crowd: 30,120)	Report; Stats
Sunday, 16 April (2:50 pm)	Greater Western Sydney 10.17 (77)	def.	Hawthorn 11.9 (75)	Norwood Oval (crowd: 9,057)	Report; Stats
Sunday, 16 April (4:20 pm)	St Kilda 9.10 (64)	def. by	Collingwood 10.10 (70)	Adelaide Oval (crowd: 43,976)	Report; Stats

=== Round 6 ===
	Round 6 (Anzac Appeal Round)
Friday, 21 April (6:10 pm)	Fremantle 10.9 (69)	def. by	Western Bulldogs 17.16 (118)	Optus Stadium (crowd: 47,503)	Report; Stats
Saturday, 22 April (1:15 pm)	Port Adelaide 16.13 (109)	def.	West Coast 10.9 (69)	Adelaide Oval (crowd: 31,638)	Report; Stats
Saturday, 22 April (4:35 pm)	Greater Western Sydney 13.9 (87)	def. by	Brisbane Lions 16.12 (108)	Manuka Oval (crowd: 10,461)	Report; Stats
Saturday, 22 April (7:25 pm)	Geelong 20.10 (130)	def.	Sydney 5.7 (37)	GMHBA Stadium (crowd: 23,134)	Report; Stats
Sunday, 23 April (1:10 pm)	Hawthorn 11.10 (76)	def. by	Adelaide 11.13 (79)	University of Tasmania Stadium (crowd: 10,119)	Report; Stats
Sunday, 23 April (3:20 pm)	Carlton 8.12 (60)	def. by	St Kilda 12.10 (82)	Marvel Stadium (crowd: 45,770)	Report; Stats
Sunday, 23 April (4:40 pm)	Gold Coast 14.13 (97)	def.	North Melbourne 7.12 (54)	Heritage Bank Stadium (crowd: 9,672)	Report; Stats
Monday, 24 April (7:25 pm)	Melbourne 15.6 (96)	def.	Richmond 11.12 (78)	Melbourne Cricket Ground (crowd: 83,985)	Report; Stats
Tuesday, 25 April (3:20 pm)	Collingwood 13.12 (90)	def.	Essendon 11.11 (77)	Melbourne Cricket Ground (crowd: 95,179)	Report; Stats
Sydney's 93-point loss to Geelong was its biggest loss since 1998; its score of 0.3 (3) in the second half was its lowest second half score since 1971.; The crowd of 95,179 for the Collingwood v Essendon match is the largest ever crowd for a home-and-away match involving Essendon and the second-largest home-and-away crowd in VFL/AFL history.

=== Round 7 ===
	Round 7
Friday, 28 April (7:50 pm)	St Kilda 11.10 (76)	def. by	Port Adelaide 12.11 (83)	Marvel Stadium (crowd: 25,845)	Report; Stats
Saturday, 29 April (1:45 pm)	Brisbane Lions 17.13 (115)	def.	Fremantle 10.7 (67)	The Gabba (crowd: 25,528)	Report; Stats
Saturday, 29 April (2:10 pm)	Sydney 16.10 (106)	def. by	Greater Western Sydney 17.5 (107)	Sydney Cricket Ground (crowd: 31,615)	Report; Stats
Saturday, 29 April (4:35 pm)	Western Bulldogs 14.10 (94)	def.	Hawthorn 9.11 (65)	Marvel Stadium (crowd: 40,119)	Report; Stats
Saturday, 29 April (7:25 pm)	Melbourne 22.7 (139)	def.	North Melbourne 7.7 (49)	Melbourne Cricket Ground (crowd: 29,455)	Report; Stats
Saturday, 29 April (5:30 pm)	West Coast 6.8 (44)	def. by	Carlton 23.14 (152)	Optus Stadium (crowd: 47,940)	Report; Stats
Sunday, 30 April (1:10 pm)	Essendon 16.8 (104)	def. by	Geelong 20.12 (132)	Melbourne Cricket Ground (crowd: 67,457)	Report; Stats
Sunday, 30 April (3:20 pm)	Richmond 6.12 (48)	def. by	Gold Coast 11.6 (72)	Marvel Stadium (crowd: 23,664)	Report; Stats
Sunday, 30 April (4:10 pm)	Adelaide 7.16 (58)	def. by	Collingwood 8.11 (59)	Adelaide Oval (crowd: 43,942)	Report; Stats

=== Round 8 ===
	Round 8
Friday, 5 May (7:50 pm)	Carlton 11.8 (74)	def. by	Brisbane Lions 15.10 (100)	Marvel Stadium (crowd: 45,458)	Report; Stats
Saturday, 6 May (1:45 pm)	Richmond 15.14 (104)	def.	West Coast 8.10 (58)	Melbourne Cricket Ground (crowd: 28,293)	Report; Stats
Saturday, 6 May (2:10 pm)	Geelong 14.14 (98)	def.	Adelaide 11.6 (72)	GMHBA Stadium (crowd: 21,415)	Report; Stats
Saturday, 6 May (4:35 pm)	Gold Coast 13.7 (85)	def. by	Melbourne 13.12 (90)	Heritage Bank Stadium (crowd: 11,440)	Report; Stats
Saturday, 6 May (7:30 pm)	Greater Western Sydney 10.11 (71)	def. by	Western Bulldogs 13.8 (86)	Manuka Oval (crowd: 10,039)	Report; Stats
Saturday, 6 May (5:30 pm)	Fremantle 18.9 (117)	def.	Hawthorn 7.6 (48)	Optus Stadium (crowd: 37,160)	Report; Stats
Sunday, 7 May (12:40 pm)	Port Adelaide 12.20 (92)	def.	Essendon 13.9 (87)	Adelaide Oval (crowd: 36,247)	Report; Stats
Sunday, 7 May (3:20 pm)	Collingwood 11.11 (77)	def.	Sydney 6.12 (48)	Melbourne Cricket Ground (crowd: 71,463)	Report; Stats
Sunday, 7 May (4:40 pm)	North Melbourne 4.10 (34)	def. by	St Kilda 8.16 (64)	Marvel Stadium (crowd: 22,065)	Report; Stats
The crowd of 45,548 for the Carlton v Brisbane Lions match is the largest ever crowd for a home-and-away match between the two clubs.; North Melbourne's score of 0.7 (7) in the first half against St Kilda marked its first goalless first half since 1979 and was its lowest ever first half score against St Kilda.

=== Round 9 ===
	Round 9
Friday, 12 May (7:20 pm)	Richmond 16.6 (102)	def.	Geelong 11.12 (78)	Melbourne Cricket Ground (crowd: 58,141)	Report; Stats
Friday, 12 May (6:40 pm)	West Coast 6.7 (43)	def. by	Gold Coast 16.17 (113)	Optus Stadium (crowd: 36,219)	Report; Stats
Saturday, 13 May (1:45 pm)	Sydney 13.8 (86)	def. by	Fremantle 16.7 (103)	Sydney Cricket Ground (crowd: 28,927)	Report; Stats
Saturday, 13 May (2:10 pm)	North Melbourne 10.5 (65)	def. by	Port Adelaide 20.15 (135)	Blundstone Arena (crowd: 6,310)	Report; Stats
Saturday, 13 May (4:35 pm)	Hawthorn 7.7 (49)	def. by	Melbourne 15.13 (103)	Melbourne Cricket Ground (crowd: 39,818)	Report; Stats
Saturday, 13 May (7:25 pm)	Brisbane Lions 12.15 (87)	def.	Essendon 6.9 (45)	The Gabba (crowd: 31,898)	Report; Stats
Saturday, 13 May (7:30 pm)	Carlton 8.11 (59)	def. by	Western Bulldogs 11.13 (79)	Marvel Stadium (crowd: 42,756)	Report; Stats
Sunday, 14 May (12:40 pm)	Adelaide 19.7 (121)	def.	St Kilda 10.9 (69)	Adelaide Oval (crowd: 33,805)	Report; Stats
Sunday, 14 May (4:40 pm)	Collingwood 18.12 (120)	def.	Greater Western Sydney 7.13 (55)	Melbourne Cricket Ground (crowd: 37,631)	Report; Stats

=== Round 10 ===
	Round 10 (Sir Doug Nicholls Round week 1)
Friday, 19 May (7:20 pm)	Port Adelaide 11.14 (80)	def.	Melbourne 11.10 (76)	Adelaide Oval (crowd: 37,565)	Report; Stats
Saturday, 20 May (1:45 pm)	North Melbourne 14.6 (90)	def. by	Sydney 14.9 (93)	Marvel Stadium (crowd: 21,003)	Report; Stats
Saturday, 20 May (2:10 pm)	Western Bulldogs 11.19 (85)	def.	Adelaide 5.10 (40)	Mars Stadium (crowd: 10,114)	Report; Stats
Saturday, 20 May (2:35 pm)	Fremantle 16.10 (106)	def.	Geelong 11.11 (77)	Optus Stadium (crowd: 45,811)	Report; Stats
Saturday, 20 May (7:30 pm)	Brisbane Lions 16.11 (107)	def.	Gold Coast 9.10 (64)	The Gabba (crowd: 23,286)	Report; Stats
Saturday, 20 May (7:40 pm)	Essendon 10.11 (71)	def.	Richmond 10.10 (70)	Melbourne Cricket Ground (crowd: 78,300)	Report; Stats
Sunday, 21 May (1:10 pm)	Hawthorn 22.10 (142)	def.	West Coast 4.2 (26)	University of Tasmania Stadium (crowd: 9,135)	Report; Stats
Sunday, 21 May (3:20 pm)	Carlton 7.15 (57)	def. by	Collingwood 13.7 (85)	Melbourne Cricket Ground (crowd: 80,354)	Report; Stats
Sunday, 21 May (4:40 pm)	Greater Western Sydney 12.8 (80)	def. by	St Kilda 13.14 (92)	Giants Stadium (crowd: 7,508)	Report; Stats
Three clubs rebranded themselves with Indigenous club names across the two weeks of the Sir Doug Nicholls Round. Two clubs were doing this for the first time: Fremantle as Walyalup; and Port Adelaide as Yartapuulti.; North Melbourne won its first quarter since round 5, ending a streak of 21 consecutive quarters lost, the most by any team since 1897.; North Melbourne led by three points in the final minute of its match against Sydney, before conceding a free kick and 50-metre penalty for making a 76th interchange, exceeding the limit of 75; Sydney kicked a goal from the free kick to take the lead and held on to win the match.; The crowd of 45,811 for the Walyalup v Geelong match is the largest ever crowd for a match between the two clubs.; Essendon's win was its first against Richmond since 2014, ending a 13-match losing streak.; Hawthorn's 116-point win was the biggest win by a last-placed team at the time of the match since 1979.; West Coast's score of 4.2 (26) was its lowest ever against Hawthorn, and its 116-point loss was its biggest since 2008.

=== Round 11 ===
	Round 11 (Sir Doug Nicholls Round week 2)
Friday, 26 May (7:50 pm)	Sydney 11.11 (77)	def.	Carlton 6.15 (51)	Sydney Cricket Ground (crowd: 36,310)	Report; Stats
Saturday, 27 May (1:45 pm)	St Kilda 12.6 (78)	def. by	Hawthorn 12.16 (88)	Marvel Stadium (crowd: 32,022)	Report; Stats
Saturday, 27 May (2:10 pm)	Melbourne 10.12 (72)	def. by	Fremantle 12.7 (79)	Melbourne Cricket Ground (crowd: 29,154)	Report; Stats
Saturday, 27 May (4:35 pm)	Geelong 10.14 (74)	def. by	Greater Western Sydney 12.9 (81)	GMHBA Stadium (crowd: 21,349)	Report; Stats
Saturday, 27 May (6:55 pm)	Gold Coast 13.6 (84)	def.	Western Bulldogs 11.11 (77)	TIO Stadium (crowd: 9,316)	Report; Stats
Saturday, 27 May (5:40 pm)	West Coast 6.10 (46)	def. by	Essendon 14.12 (96)	Optus Stadium (crowd: 39,269)	Report; Stats
Sunday, 28 May (1:10 pm)	Richmond 9.13 (67)	def. by	Port Adelaide 10.17 (77)	Melbourne Cricket Ground (crowd: 30,357)	Report; Stats
Sunday, 28 May (3:20 pm)	Collingwood 16.9 (105)	def.	North Melbourne 10.10 (70)	Marvel Stadium (crowd: 39,467)	Report; Stats
Sunday, 28 May (4:10 pm)	Adelaide 14.11 (95)	def.	Brisbane Lions 10.18 (78)	Adelaide Oval (crowd: 33,188)	Report; Stats
Geelong fielded three Irish players against Greater Western Sydney, becoming the first club in VFL/AFL history to field three in the same team.

=== Round 12 ===
	Round 12
Friday, 2 June (7:50 pm)	Melbourne 8.13 (61)	def.	Carlton 6.8 (44)	Melbourne Cricket Ground (crowd: 49,872)	Report; Stats
Saturday, 3 June (1:15 pm)	Port Adelaide 23.13 (151)	def.	Hawthorn 14.12 (96)	Adelaide Oval (crowd: 34,234)	Report; Stats
Saturday, 3 June (2:35 pm)	West Coast 8.9 (57)	def. by	Collingwood 18.12 (120)	Optus Stadium (crowd: 41,713)	Report; Stats
Saturday, 3 June (7:25 pm)	Western Bulldogs 10.15 (75)	def. by	Geelong 15.7 (97)	Marvel Stadium (crowd: 41,944)	Report; Stats
Saturday, 3 June (7:00 pm)	Gold Coast 16.16 (112)	def.	Adelaide 13.9 (87)	TIO Stadium (crowd: 10,772)	Report; Stats
Sunday, 4 June (1:10 pm)	Greater Western Sydney 15.14 (104)	def. by	Richmond 16.14 (110)	Giants Stadium (crowd: 9,723)	Report; Stats
Sunday, 4 June (4:40 pm)	Essendon 16.9 (105)	def.	North Melbourne 15.9 (99)	Marvel Stadium (crowd: 40,488)	Report; Stats
	Bye: Brisbane Lions; Fremantle; St Kilda; Sydney
Port Adelaide's first half score of 16.9 (105) was the highest ever first half score in its history and the highest by any club since 2012; its half-time lead of 82 points was also the biggest in its history.; West Coast lost its tenth consecutive match, a club record; it would lose a further six consecutive matches to set the record at 16.

=== Round 13 ===
	Round 13
Thursday, 8 June (7:10 pm)	Sydney 9.12 (66)	def. by	St Kilda 12.8 (80)	Sydney Cricket Ground (crowd: 30,123)	Report; Stats
Friday, 9 June (7:50 pm)	Western Bulldogs 13.7 (85)	def. by	Port Adelaide 16.11 (107)	Marvel Stadium (crowd: 23,110)	Report; Stats
Saturday, 10 June (1:45 pm)	Hawthorn 15.8 (98)	def.	Brisbane Lions 11.7 (73)	Melbourne Cricket Ground (crowd: 35,869)	Report; Stats
Saturday, 10 June (4:05 pm)	Adelaide 27.12 (174)	def.	West Coast 8.4 (52)	Adelaide Oval (crowd: 39,450)	Report; Stats
Saturday, 10 June (5:25 pm)	Fremantle 10.10 (70)	def. by	Richmond 12.13 (85)	Optus Stadium (crowd: 46,843)	Report; Stats
Sunday, 11 June (3:20 pm)	North Melbourne 11.9 (75)	def. by	Greater Western Sydney 15.13 (103)	Blundstone Arena (crowd: 5,025)	Report; Stats
Sunday, 11 June (7:15 pm)	Carlton 6.16 (52)	def. by	Essendon 13.8 (86)	Melbourne Cricket Ground (crowd: 83,638)	Report; Stats
Monday, 12 June (3:20 pm)	Melbourne 8.18 (66)	def.	Collingwood 9.8 (62)	Melbourne Cricket Ground (crowd: 83,578)	Report; Stats
	Bye: Geelong; Gold Coast
Adelaide's 122-point win was its biggest ever over West Coast; Taylor Walker (Adelaide) kicked a career-high ten goals, in what was also his 250th AFL match.; The crowd of 46,843 for the Fremantle v Richmond match is the largest ever crowd for a match between the two clubs.

=== Round 14 ===
	Round 14
Thursday, 15 June (7:10 pm)	Port Adelaide 16.14 (110)	def.	Geelong 11.6 (72)	Adelaide Oval (crowd: 36,316)	Report; Stats
Friday, 16 June (7:50 pm)	Brisbane Lions 13.19 (97)	def.	Sydney 12.9 (81)	The Gabba (crowd: 28,561)	Report; Stats
Saturday, 17 June (4:35 pm)	Greater Western Sydney 16.10 (106)	def.	Fremantle 5.6 (36)	Giants Stadium (crowd: 8,633)	Report; Stats
Saturday, 17 June (7:25 pm)	Richmond 13.12 (90)	def.	St Kilda 11.4 (70)	Melbourne Cricket Ground (crowd: 62,686)	Report; Stats
Sunday, 18 June (1:10 pm)	Carlton 18.12 (120)	def.	Gold Coast 8.13 (61)	Melbourne Cricket Ground (crowd: 29,602)	Report; Stats
Sunday, 18 June (4:40 pm)	North Melbourne 13.6 (84)	def. by	Western Bulldogs 15.15 (105)	Marvel Stadium (crowd: 23,829)	Report; Stats
	Bye: Adelaide; Collingwood; Essendon; Hawthorn; Melbourne; West Coast

=== Round 15 ===
	Round 15
Thursday, 22 June (7:20 pm)	Geelong 11.12 (78)	def.	Melbourne 8.15 (63)	GMHBA Stadium (crowd: 19,617)	Report; Stats
Friday, 23 June (7:50 pm)	St Kilda 8.8 (56)	def. by	Brisbane Lions 12.12 (84)	Marvel Stadium (crowd: 28,985)	Report; Stats
Saturday, 24 June (4:35 pm)	Sydney 31.19 (205)	def.	West Coast 5.4 (34)	Sydney Cricket Ground (crowd: 31,367)	Report; Stats
Saturday, 24 June (5:30 pm)	Fremantle 14.9 (93)	def.	Essendon 9.7 (61)	Optus Stadium (crowd: 43,063)	Report; Stats
Sunday, 25 June (1:10 pm)	Collingwood 12.10 (82)	def.	Adelaide 11.14 (80)	Melbourne Cricket Ground (crowd: 65,930)	Report; Stats
Sunday, 25 June (4:40 pm)	Gold Coast 14.17 (101)	def.	Hawthorn 5.4 (34)	Heritage Bank Stadium (crowd: 14,242)	Report; Stats
	Bye: Carlton; Greater Western Sydney; North Melbourne; Port Adelaide; Richmond; Western Bulldogs
The margin of 171 points in the Sydney v West Coast match was Sydney's equal-biggest ever win and West Coast's biggest ever loss.; Sydney's score of 31.19 (205) was the highest by any team since 2011 and the highest ever conceded by West Coast.; Sydney's score of 25.14 (164) at three-quarter time was its highest ever three-quarter time score.

=== Round 16 ===
	Round 16
Thursday, 29 June (7:20 pm)	Brisbane Lions 20.14 (134)	def.	Richmond 7.11 (53)	The Gabba (crowd: 30,022)	Report; Stats
Friday, 30 June (7:50 pm)	Sydney 6.18 (54)	drew with	Geelong 7.12 (54)	Sydney Cricket Ground (crowd: 32,098)	Report; Stats
Saturday, 1 July (1:15 pm)	Adelaide 21.12 (138)	def.	North Melbourne 11.6 (72)	Adelaide Oval (crowd: 35,226)	Report; Stats
Saturday, 1 July (1:45 pm)	Western Bulldogs 16.6 (102)	def.	Fremantle 11.7 (73)	Marvel Stadium (crowd: 25,412)	Report; Stats
Saturday, 1 July (4:35 pm)	Gold Coast 5.12 (42)	def. by	Collingwood 18.12 (120)	Heritage Bank Stadium (crowd: 22,483)	Report; Stats
Saturday, 1 July (7:25 pm)	Essendon 10.14 (74)	def. by	Port Adelaide 11.12 (78)	Melbourne Cricket Ground (crowd: 38,957)	Report; Stats
Sunday, 2 July (1:10 pm)	Hawthorn 7.10 (52)	def. by	Carlton 17.10 (112)	Melbourne Cricket Ground (crowd: 66,337)	Report; Stats
Sunday, 2 July (2:50 pm)	Melbourne 5.15 (45)	def. by	Greater Western Sydney 7.5 (47)	TIO Traeger Park (crowd: 3,413)	Report; Stats
Sunday, 2 July (2:40 pm)	West Coast 12.5 (77)	def. by	St Kilda 12.13 (85)	Optus Stadium (crowd: 35,579)	Report; Stats
The crowd of 22,483 for the Gold Coast v Collingwood match was Gold Coast's largest home crowd in Queensland since 2014.; Dan Houston (Port Adelaide) kicked a goal after the final siren to win the match against Essendon.; Hawthorn's score of 0.5 (5) in the first half against Carlton was its lowest ever score in a half against Carlton; it was also the first time that Carlton held an opponent goalless in the first half of a match since 2004.; Greater Western Sydney's score of 7.5 (47) against Melbourne was its lowest ever winning score.; West Coast won its first quarter since round 9, ending a winless streak of 21 consecutive quarters.

=== Round 17 ===
	Round 17
Thursday, 6 July (7:20 pm)	Richmond 12.16 (88)	def.	Sydney 11.9 (75)	Melbourne Cricket Ground (crowd: 48,443)	Report; Stats
Friday, 7 July (7:50 pm)	Western Bulldogs 11.11 (77)	def. by	Collingwood 13.11 (89)	Marvel Stadium (crowd: 43,482)	Report; Stats
Saturday, 8 July (1:45 pm)	Brisbane Lions 16.20 (116)	def.	West Coast 5.5 (35)	The Gabba (crowd: 24,843)	Report; Stats
Saturday, 8 July (4:35 pm)	Greater Western Sydney 12.13 (85)	def.	Hawthorn 10.12 (72)	Giants Stadium (crowd: 9,007)	Report; Stats
Saturday, 8 July (7:25 pm)	St Kilda 8.10 (58)	def. by	Melbourne 12.7 (79)	Marvel Stadium (crowd: 30,749)	Report; Stats
Saturday, 8 July (7:10 pm)	Port Adelaide 16.10 (106)	def.	Gold Coast 11.7 (73)	Adelaide Oval (crowd: 31,053)	Report; Stats
Sunday, 9 July (1:10 pm)	Geelong 19.11 (125)	def.	North Melbourne 9.9 (63)	GMHBA Stadium (crowd: 21,066)	Report; Stats
Sunday, 9 July (3:20 pm)	Essendon 17.13 (115)	def.	Adelaide 15.9 (97)	Marvel Stadium (crowd: 39,606)	Report; Stats
Sunday, 9 July (2:40 pm)	Fremantle 6.9 (45)	def. by	Carlton 14.14 (98)	Optus Stadium (crowd: 49,469)	Report; Stats
Scott Pendlebury (Collingwood) broke the record for the most career disposals recorded in VFL/AFL history during the match against the Western Bulldogs, surpassing the record of 9,656 disposals held by Robert Harvey (St Kilda).; The crowd of 43,482 for the Western Bulldogs v Collingwood match was the Western Bulldogs' largest home crowd since 2017.; Zach Tuohy (Geelong) played his 265th match, breaking the record for the most VFL/AFL matches by an Irish player.

=== Round 18 ===
	Round 18
Thursday, 13 July (7:20 pm)	Sydney 11.12 (78)	def.	Western Bulldogs 11.10 (76)	Sydney Cricket Ground (crowd: 26,221)	Report; Stats
Friday, 14 July (7:50 pm)	Melbourne 16.9 (105)	def.	Brisbane Lions 16.8 (104)	Melbourne Cricket Ground (crowd: 38,030)	Report; Stats
Saturday, 15 July (1:45 pm)	Collingwood 18.5 (113)	def.	Fremantle 10.7 (67)	Melbourne Cricket Ground (crowd: 61,157)	Report; Stats
Saturday, 15 July (2:10 pm)	Gold Coast 11.11 (77)	def.	St Kilda 8.3 (51)	Heritage Bank Stadium (crowd: 13,015)	Report; Stats
Saturday, 15 July (4:35 pm)	Carlton 18.14 (122)	def.	Port Adelaide 10.12 (72)	Marvel Stadium (crowd: 34,306)	Report; Stats
Saturday, 15 July (7:25 pm)	Geelong 18.14 (122)	def.	Essendon 7.3 (45)	GMHBA Stadium (crowd: 23,185)	Report; Stats
Saturday, 15 July (7:10 pm)	Adelaide 8.9 (57)	def. by	Greater Western Sydney 10.11 (71)	Adelaide Oval (crowd: 36,674)	Report; Stats
Sunday, 16 July (1:10 pm)	North Melbourne 6.4 (40)	def. by	Hawthorn 12.16 (88)	Marvel Stadium (crowd: 30,201)	Report; Stats
Sunday, 16 July (2:40 pm)	West Coast 8.12 (60)	def. by	Richmond 14.14 (98)	Optus Stadium (crowd: 40,501)	Report; Stats
Port Adelaide's loss to Carlton ended a club record 13-match winning streak.

=== Round 19 ===
	Round 19
Friday, 21 July (7:50 pm)	Essendon 7.7 (49)	def. by	Western Bulldogs 13.12 (90)	Marvel Stadium (crowd: 43,634)	Report; Stats
Saturday, 22 July (1:45 pm)	Richmond 14.12 (96)	def.	Hawthorn 15.5 (95)	Melbourne Cricket Ground (crowd: 57,654)	Report; Stats
Saturday, 22 July (2:10 pm)	Carlton 21.14 (140)	def.	West Coast 10.9 (69)	Marvel Stadium (crowd: 34,954)	Report; Stats
Saturday, 22 July (4:35 pm)	Brisbane Lions 9.10 (64)	def.	Geelong 7.11 (53)	The Gabba (crowd: 32,586)	Report; Stats
Saturday, 22 July (5:40 pm)	Fremantle 12.4 (76)	def. by	Sydney 16.9 (105)	Optus Stadium (crowd: 42,433)	Report; Stats
Saturday, 22 July (7:10 pm)	Port Adelaide 12.11 (83)	def. by	Collingwood 13.7 (85)	Adelaide Oval (crowd: 47,965)	Report; Stats
Sunday, 23 July (1:10 pm)	Greater Western Sydney 15.13 (103)	def.	Gold Coast 9.9 (63)	Manuka Oval (crowd: 10,026)	Report; Stats
Sunday, 23 July (3:20 pm)	Melbourne 14.13 (97)	def.	Adelaide 13.15 (93)	Melbourne Cricket Ground (crowd: 33,122)	Report; Stats
Sunday, 23 July (4:40 pm)	St Kilda 9.15 (69)	def.	North Melbourne 9.7 (61)	Marvel Stadium (crowd: 18,279)	Report; Stats

=== Round 20 ===
	Round 20
Friday, 28 July (7:50 pm)	Collingwood 10.16 (76)	def. by	Carlton 14.9 (93)	Melbourne Cricket Ground (crowd: 86,785)	Report; Stats
Saturday, 29 July (1:45 pm)	Geelong 9.10 (64)	def. by	Fremantle 10.11 (71)	GMHBA Stadium (crowd: 21,619)	Report; Stats
Saturday, 29 July (1:45 pm)	Western Bulldogs 10.13 (73)	def. by	Greater Western Sydney 11.12 (78)	Mars Stadium (crowd: 9,080)	Report; Stats
Saturday, 29 July (4:35 pm)	Gold Coast 15.6 (96)	def.	Brisbane Lions 7.13 (55)	Heritage Bank Stadium (crowd: 14,097)	Report; Stats
Saturday, 29 July (7:25 pm)	Essendon 15.9 (99)	def. by	Sydney 15.11 (101)	Marvel Stadium (crowd: 38,329)	Report; Stats
Saturday, 29 July (7:10 pm)	Adelaide 16.16 (112)	def.	Port Adelaide 9.11 (65)	Adelaide Oval (crowd: 50,023)	Report; Stats
Sunday, 30 July (1:10 pm)	Hawthorn 14.9 (93)	def. by	St Kilda 19.8 (122)	Marvel Stadium (crowd: 22,769)	Report; Stats
Sunday, 30 July (3:20 pm)	Richmond 15.8 (98)	def. by	Melbourne 20.10 (130)	Melbourne Cricket Ground (crowd: 52,294)	Report; Stats
Sunday, 30 July (4:40 pm)	West Coast 10.12 (72)	def.	North Melbourne 10.7 (67)	Optus Stadium (crowd: 38,231)	Report; Stats
Chris Scott coached his 305th match for Geelong in its loss to Fremantle, breaking the record held by Reg Hickey for most VFL/AFL matches coached for Geelong.; Gold Coast's win was its first QClash win since 2018, ending a nine-match losing streak against the Brisbane Lions.; West Coast's win over North Melbourne ended a club record 16-match losing streak.

=== Round 21 ===
	Round 21
Friday, 4 August (7:50 pm)	Western Bulldogs 19.12 (126)	def.	Richmond 10.11 (71)	Marvel Stadium (crowd: 39,304)	Report; Stats
Saturday, 5 August (1:45 pm)	Essendon 10.13 (73)	def.	West Coast 11.6 (72)	Marvel Stadium (crowd: 30,742)	Report; Stats
Saturday, 5 August (1:40 pm)	Adelaide 13.11 (89)	def.	Gold Coast 9.7 (61)	Adelaide Oval (crowd: 35,777)	Report; Stats
Saturday, 5 August (4:35 pm)	Hawthorn 16.9 (105)	def.	Collingwood 11.7 (73)	Melbourne Cricket Ground (crowd: 62,134)	Report; Stats
Saturday, 5 August (7:25 pm)	Geelong 14.13 (97)	def.	Port Adelaide 12.13 (85)	GMHBA Stadium (crowd: 21,279)	Report; Stats
Saturday, 5 August (7:30 pm)	Greater Western Sydney 12.13 (85)	def. by	Sydney 15.6 (96)	Giants Stadium (crowd: 19,332)	Report; Stats
Sunday, 6 August (1:10 pm)	North Melbourne 10.11 (71)	def. by	Melbourne 15.13 (103)	Blundstone Arena (crowd: 8,034)	Report; Stats
Sunday, 6 August (3:20 pm)	St Kilda 8.6 (54)	def. by	Carlton 10.13 (73)	Marvel Stadium (crowd: 42,656)	Report; Stats
Sunday, 6 August (2:40 pm)	Fremantle 11.8 (74)	def. by	Brisbane Lions 11.11 (77)	Optus Stadium (crowd: 37,845)	Report; Stats
Brett Rosebury umpired his 503rd AFL match in the Western Bulldogs v Richmond match, breaking the record held by Shane McInerney for most VFL/AFL matches officiated by a field umpire.

=== Round 22 ===
	Round 22
Friday, 11 August (7:50 pm)	Collingwood 16.13 (109)	def.	Geelong 15.11 (101)	Melbourne Cricket Ground (crowd: 78,749)	Report; Stats
Saturday, 12 August (1:45 pm)	North Melbourne 12.5 (77)	def. by	Essendon 13.8 (86)	Marvel Stadium (crowd: 37,231)	Report; Stats
Saturday, 12 August (1:45 pm)	Sydney 18.6 (114)	def.	Gold Coast 13.12 (90)	Sydney Cricket Ground (crowd: 33,911)	Report; Stats
Saturday, 12 August (4:35 pm)	Brisbane Lions 15.9 (99)	def.	Adelaide 13.15 (93)	The Gabba (crowd: 30,107)	Report; Stats
Saturday, 12 August (7:30 pm)	Carlton 9.6 (60)	def.	Melbourne 8.8 (56)	Melbourne Cricket Ground (crowd: 68,577)	Report; Stats
Saturday, 12 August (6:10 pm)	West Coast 4.9 (33)	def. by	Fremantle 20.14 (134)	Optus Stadium (crowd: 51,172)	Report; Stats
Sunday, 13 August (1:10 pm)	Hawthorn 9.13 (67)	def.	Western Bulldogs 9.10 (64)	University of Tasmania Stadium (crowd: 12,480)	Report; Stats
Sunday, 13 August (3:20 pm)	St Kilda 14.9 (93)	def.	Richmond 8.9 (57)	Marvel Stadium (crowd: 31,119)	Report; Stats
Sunday, 13 August (4:10 pm)	Port Adelaide 21.10 (136)	def.	Greater Western Sydney 13.7 (85)	Adelaide Oval (crowd: 32,597)	Report; Stats
The Sydney v Gold Coast (2:10 pm to 1:45 pm) and Carlton v Melbourne (7:25 pm to 7:30 pm) matches were rescheduled to accommodate the Seven Network's coverage of Australia's 2023 FIFA Women's World Cup quarter-final against France.; The margin of 101 points in the West Coast v Fremantle match was the biggest in a Western Derby since 2000 and Fremantle's biggest ever win over West Coast.; West Coast's score of 4.9 (33) against Fremantle was its lowest ever in a Western Derby.

=== Round 23 ===
	Round 23
Friday, 18 August (7:50 pm)	Collingwood 15.10 (100)	def. by	Brisbane Lions 19.10 (124)	Marvel Stadium (crowd: 38,350)	Report; Stats
Saturday, 19 August (1:45 pm)	Richmond 14.17 (101)	def.	North Melbourne 10.12 (72)	Melbourne Cricket Ground (crowd: 59,555)	Report; Stats
Saturday, 19 August (2:10 pm)	Gold Coast 13.9 (87)	def. by	Carlton 13.13 (91)	Heritage Bank Stadium (crowd: 19,253)	Report; Stats
Saturday, 19 August (4:35 pm)	Greater Western Sydney 25.12 (162)	def.	Essendon 5.6 (36)	Giants Stadium (crowd: 10,281)	Report; Stats
Saturday, 19 August (7:25 pm)	St Kilda 12.16 (88)	def.	Geelong 8.7 (55)	Marvel Stadium (crowd: 40,103)	Report; Stats
Saturday, 19 August (7:10 pm)	Adelaide 10.13 (73)	def. by	Sydney 11.8 (74)	Adelaide Oval (crowd: 44,817)	Report; Stats
Sunday, 20 August (1:10 pm)	Western Bulldogs 12.13 (85)	def. by	West Coast 14.8 (92)	Marvel Stadium (crowd: 23,965)	Report; Stats
Sunday, 20 August (3:20 pm)	Melbourne 13.9 (87)	def.	Hawthorn 9.6 (60)	Melbourne Cricket Ground (crowd: 50,142)	Report; Stats
Sunday, 20 August (2:40 pm)	Fremantle 8.10 (58)	def. by	Port Adelaide 11.8 (74)	Optus Stadium (crowd: 38,360)	Report; Stats
Greater Western Sydney's 126-point win over Essendon was its biggest ever.; Essendon's score of 5.6 (36) was its lowest against Greater Western Sydney.; Sydney led by two points with a minute remaining in its match against Adelaide, before an Adelaide shot at goal was deemed to have grazed the goal post, with the goal umpire opting not to call for a score review; Sydney held on to win the match. The AFL admitted the following day that this was an error, and that the review system would have overturned the decision and changed the score to a goal if it had been referred by the goal umpire; the result stood, with the loss eliminating Adelaide from finals contention, and the goal umpire was stood down for the rest of the season.

=== Round 24 ===
	Round 24
Friday, 25 August (7:50 pm)	Essendon 3.13 (31)	def. by	Collingwood 16.5 (101)	Melbourne Cricket Ground (crowd: 74,344)	Report; Stats
Saturday, 26 August (1:45 pm)	North Melbourne 20.12 (132)	def.	Gold Coast 14.13 (97)	Blundstone Arena (crowd: 4,378)	Report; Stats
Saturday, 26 August (1:45 pm)	Hawthorn 8.8 (56)	def. by	Fremantle 14.9 (93)	Melbourne Cricket Ground (crowd: 27,951)	Report; Stats
Saturday, 26 August (4:35 pm)	Brisbane Lions 9.18 (72)	def.	St Kilda 9.6 (60)	The Gabba (crowd: 31,689)	Report; Stats
Saturday, 26 August (7:25 pm)	Geelong 11.13 (79)	def. by	Western Bulldogs 16.8 (104)	GMHBA Stadium (crowd: 20,533)	Report; Stats
Saturday, 26 August (6:10 pm)	West Coast 12.6 (78)	def. by	Adelaide 17.21 (123)	Optus Stadium (crowd: 47,027)	Report; Stats
Sunday, 27 August (12:00 pm)	Port Adelaide 13.16 (94)	def.	Richmond 8.15 (63)	Adelaide Oval (crowd: 39,860)	Report; Stats
Sunday, 27 August (3:20 pm)	Sydney 7.14 (56)	def. by	Melbourne 11.11 (77)	Sydney Cricket Ground (crowd: 41,753)	Report; Stats
Sunday, 27 August (6:10 pm)	Carlton 11.7 (73)	def. by	Greater Western Sydney 16.9 (105)	Marvel Stadium (crowd: 44,354)	Report; Stats
North Melbourne's win over Gold Coast ended a 20-match losing streak, the club's longest losing streak since 1935.

== Ladder ==
Pos	Team	Pld	W	L	D	PF	PA	PP	Pts	Qualification
1	Collingwood (P)	23	18	5	0	2142	1687	127.0	72	Finals series
2	Brisbane Lions	23	17	6	0	2180	1771	123.1	68	Finals series
3	Port Adelaide	23	17	6	0	2149	1906	112.7	68	Finals series
4	Melbourne	23	16	7	0	2079	1660	125.2	64	Finals series
5	Carlton	23	13	9	1	1922	1697	113.3	54	Finals series
6	St Kilda	23	13	10	0	1775	1647	107.8	52	Finals series
7	Greater Western Sydney	23	13	10	0	2018	1885	107.1	52	Finals series
8	Sydney	23	12	10	1	2050	1863	110.0	50	Finals series
9	Western Bulldogs	23	12	11	0	1919	1766	108.7	48	
10	Adelaide	23	11	12	0	2193	1877	116.8	44	
11	Essendon	23	11	12	0	1838	2050	89.7	44	
12	Geelong	23	10	12	1	2088	1855	112.6	42	
13	Richmond	23	10	12	1	1856	1983	93.6	42	
14	Fremantle	23	10	13	0	1835	1898	96.7	40	
15	Gold Coast	23	9	14	0	1839	2006	91.7	36	
16	Hawthorn	23	7	16	0	1686	2101	80.2	28	
17	North Melbourne	23	3	20	0	1657	2318	71.5	12	
18	West Coast	23	3	20	0	1418	2674	53.0	12	

Source: afl.com.au
Rules for classification: 1) points; 2) percentage; 3) number of points for
(P) Premiers

== Progression by round ==
4	Finished the round in first place	0	Finished the round in last place
4	Won the minor premiership	0	Finished the season in last place
4	Finished the round inside the top eight		
4_{1}	Subscript indicates the ladder position at the end of the round		
4_{1}	Underlined points indicate the team had a bye that round		

Team	1	2	3	4	5	6	7	8	9	10	11	12	13	14	15	16	17	18	19	20	21	22	23	24
Collingwood	4_{6}	8_{4}	12_{2}	12_{5}	16_{3}	20_{2}	24_{1}	28_{1}	32_{1}	36_{1}	40_{1}	44_{1}	44_{1}	44_{2}	48_{1}	52_{1}	56_{1}	60_{1}	64_{1}	64_{1}	64_{1}	68_{1}	68_{1}	72_{1}
Brisbane Lions	0_{15}	4_{12}	4_{14}	8_{8}	12_{8}	16_{6}	20_{4}	24_{4}	28_{3}	32_{2}	32_{3}	32_{4}	32_{4}	36_{4}	40_{3}	44_{3}	48_{3}	48_{3}	52_{3}	52_{3}	56_{3}	60_{2}	64_{2}	68_{2}
Port Adelaide	4_{4}	4_{11}	4_{13}	8_{10}	12_{9}	16_{7}	20_{5}	24_{5}	28_{4}	32_{3}	36_{2}	40_{2}	44_{2}	48_{1}	48_{2}	52_{2}	56_{2}	56_{2}	56_{2}	56_{2}	56_{4}	60_{3}	64_{3}	68_{3}
Melbourne	4_{3}	4_{8}	8_{4}	12_{3}	12_{6}	16_{3}	20_{2}	24_{2}	28_{2}	28_{4}	28_{4}	32_{3}	36_{3}	36_{3}	36_{4}	36_{4}	40_{4}	44_{4}	48_{4}	52_{4}	56_{2}	56_{4}	60_{4}	64_{4}
Carlton	2_{9}	6_{7}	10_{3}	14_{2}	14_{4}	14_{8}	18_{6}	18_{8}	18_{9}	18_{11}	18_{13}	18_{14}	18_{15}	22_{14}	22_{15}	26_{14}	30_{11}	34_{10}	38_{9}	42_{7}	46_{5}	50_{5}	54_{5}	54_{5}
St Kilda	4_{5}	8_{2}	12_{1}	16_{1}	16_{1}	20_{1}	20_{3}	24_{3}	24_{5}	28_{5}	28_{5}	28_{5}	32_{5}	32_{5}	32_{5}	36_{5}	36_{6}	36_{6}	40_{6}	44_{5}	44_{7}	48_{6}	52_{6}	52_{6}
Greater Western Sydney	4_{7}	4_{10}	4_{10}	4_{15}	8_{12}	8_{12}	12_{12}	12_{13}	12_{15}	12_{15}	16_{14}	16_{15}	20_{14}	24_{11}	24_{14}	28_{10}	32_{10}	36_{9}	40_{7}	44_{6}	44_{8}	44_{10}	48_{8}	52_{7}
Sydney	4_{2}	8_{1}	8_{5}	8_{6}	12_{5}	12_{10}	12_{11}	12_{11}	12_{14}	16_{12}	20_{11}	20_{12}	20_{13}	20_{15}	24_{13}	26_{13}	26_{15}	30_{14}	34_{12}	38_{10}	42_{10}	46_{7}	50_{7}	50_{8}
Western Bulldogs	0_{16}	0_{17}	4_{16}	8_{11}	8_{14}	12_{11}	16_{10}	20_{7}	24_{6}	28_{6}	28_{6}	28_{7}	28_{8}	32_{7}	32_{7}	36_{6}	36_{7}	36_{7}	40_{5}	40_{8}	44_{6}	44_{8}	44_{9}	48_{9}
Adelaide	0_{12}	0_{15}	4_{11}	8_{7}	12_{7}	16_{5}	16_{8}	16_{10}	20_{8}	20_{8}	24_{7}	24_{9}	28_{7}	28_{8}	28_{8}	32_{7}	32_{9}	32_{12}	32_{13}	36_{12}	40_{11}	40_{12}	40_{13}	44_{10}
Essendon	4_{1}	8_{3}	8_{6}	12_{4}	16_{2}	16_{4}	16_{9}	16_{9}	16_{10}	20_{9}	24_{8}	28_{6}	32_{6}	32_{6}	32_{6}	32_{8}	36_{5}	36_{8}	36_{11}	36_{13}	40_{12}	44_{9}	44_{10}	44_{11}
Geelong	0_{13}	0_{14}	0_{18}	4_{13}	8_{10}	12_{9}	16_{7}	20_{6}	20_{7}	20_{7}	20_{10}	24_{8}	24_{9}	24_{10}	28_{9}	30_{9}	34_{8}	38_{5}	38_{8}	38_{9}	42_{9}	42_{11}	42_{11}	42_{12}
Richmond	2_{10}	6_{6}	6_{8}	6_{12}	6_{15}	6_{16}	6_{16}	10_{15}	14_{13}	14_{14}	14_{15}	18_{13}	22_{12}	26_{9}	26_{12}	26_{15}	30_{12}	34_{11}	38_{10}	38_{11}	38_{13}	38_{13}	42_{12}	42_{13}
Fremantle	0_{14}	0_{13}	4_{9}	4_{14}	8_{11}	8_{13}	8_{14}	12_{12}	16_{12}	20_{10}	24_{9}	24_{10}	24_{10}	24_{13}	28_{11}	28_{11}	28_{14}	28_{15}	28_{15}	32_{15}	32_{15}	36_{14}	36_{14}	40_{14}
Gold Coast	0_{17}	0_{16}	4_{15}	4_{17}	4_{16}	8_{14}	12_{13}	12_{14}	16_{11}	16_{13}	20_{12}	24_{11}	24_{11}	24_{12}	28_{10}	28_{12}	28_{13}	32_{13}	32_{14}	36_{14}	36_{14}	36_{15}	36_{15}	36_{15}
Hawthorn	0_{18}	0_{18}	4_{17}	4_{18}	4_{18}	4_{18}	4_{17}	4_{18}	4_{18}	8_{16}	12_{16}	12_{16}	16_{16}	16_{16}	16_{16}	16_{16}	16_{16}	20_{16}	20_{16}	20_{16}	24_{16}	28_{16}	28_{16}	28_{16}
North Melbourne	4_{8}	8_{5}	8_{7}	8_{9}	8_{13}	8_{15}	8_{15}	8_{16}	8_{16}	8_{17}	8_{17}	8_{17}	8_{17}	8_{17}	8_{17}	8_{17}	8_{17}	8_{17}	8_{17}	8_{17}	8_{17}	8_{17}	8_{18}	12_{17}
West Coast	0_{11}	4_{9}	4_{12}	4_{16}	4_{17}	4_{17}	4_{18}	4_{17}	4_{17}	4_{18}	4_{18}	4_{18}	4_{18}	4_{18}	4_{18}	4_{18}	4_{18}	4_{18}	4_{18}	8_{18}	8_{18}	8_{18}	12_{17}	12_{18}

Source: AFL Tables

== Home matches and membership ==
The following table includes all home match attendance figures from the home-and-away season, excluding neutral matches (Gather Round).

Team	Home match attendance							Membership		
Team	Hosted	Total	Highest	Lowest	Average			2022	2023	Change
Team	Hosted	Total	Highest	Lowest	2022	2023	Change	2022	2023	Change
Adelaide	11	425,119	50,023	33,188	31,429	38,647	▲7,218	63,099	68,536	▲5,437
Brisbane Lions	11	322,132	33,565	23,286	25,818	29,285	▲3,467	43,319	54,676	▲11,357
Carlton	11	565,630	83,638	29,602	49,784	51,421	▲1,637	88,776	95,277	▲6,501
Collingwood	11	720,696	95,179	37,631	48,573	65,518	▲16,945	100,384	106,470	▲6,086
Essendon	11	513,587	78,300	28,815	39,754	46,690	▲6,936	86,001	86,274	▲273
Fremantle	11	485,064	56,090	37,160	40,460	44,097	▲3,637	56,105	62,064	▲5,959
Geelong	11	355,067	86,595	19,617	26,875	32,279	▲5,404	71,943	82,155	▲10,212
Gold Coast	11	150,960	22,483	9,316	11,298	13,724	▲2,426	21,422	23,359	▲1,937
Greater Western Sydney	11	112,870	19,332	7,508	9,219	10,261	▲1,042	32,614	33,036	▲422
Hawthorn	11	366,310	68,691	9,135	26,502	33,301	▲6,799	81,494	80,698	▼796
Melbourne	11	491,277	83,985	3,413	39,218	44,662	▲5,444	66,484	70,785	▲4,301
North Melbourne	11	228,412	49,062	4,378	14,368	20,765	▲6,397	50,191	51,084	▲893
Port Adelaide	11	410,692	48,962	31,053	29,693	37,336	▲7,643	58,643	64,041	▲5,398
Richmond	11	565,620	88,084	23,667	46,485	51,420	▲4,935	100,792	101,349	▲557
St Kilda	11	353,491	69,255	21,049	25,386	32,136	▲6,750	60,172	60,239	▲67
Sydney	11	361,163	41,753	26,221	29,424	32,833	▲3,409	55,394	65,332	▲9,938
West Coast	11	464,758	51,172	35,579	36,736	42,251	▲5,515	102,897	103,275	▲378
Western Bulldogs	11	313,489	43,482	9,080	24,655	28,499	▲3,844	50,941	56,302	▲5,361
Total/overall	198	7,206,397	95,179	3,413	30,871	36,396	▲5,525	1,190,671	1,264,952	▲74,281

Source: AFL Tables

== Finals series ==
Qualifying and elimination finals
7 September, Melbourne Cricket Ground
1	Collingwood	9.6 (60)
4	Melbourne	7.11 (53)
8 September, Melbourne Cricket Ground
5	Carlton	11.8 (74)
8	Sydney	9.14 (68)
9 September, Melbourne Cricket Ground
6	St Kilda	11.11 (77)
7	Greater Western Sydney	15.11 (101)
9 September, The Gabba
2	Brisbane Lions	19.11 (125)
3	Port Adelaide	11.11 (77)

Semi-finals
15 September, Melbourne Cricket Ground
Melbourne	9.17 (71)
Carlton	11.7 (73)
16 September, Adelaide Oval
Port Adelaide	9.16 (70)
Greater Western Sydney	13.15 (93)

Preliminary finals
22 September, Melbourne Cricket Ground
Collingwood	8.10 (58)
Greater Western Sydney	8.9 (57)
23 September, The Gabba
Brisbane Lions	11.13 (79)
Carlton	9.9 (63)

Grand final
30 September, Melbourne Cricket Ground
Collingwood	12.18 (90)
Brisbane Lions	13.8 (86)

All starting times are local time. Source: AFL Tables

=== Finals week 1 ===
	First qualifying final
Thursday, 7 September (7:20 pm)	Collingwood 9.6 (60)	def.	Melbourne 7.11 (53)	Melbourne Cricket Ground (crowd: 92,636)	Report; Stats

	First elimination final
Friday, 8 September (7:50 pm)	Carlton 11.8 (74)	def.	Sydney 9.14 (68)	Melbourne Cricket Ground (crowd: 92,026)	Report; Stats

	Second elimination final
Saturday, 9 September (3:20 pm)	St Kilda 11.11 (77)	def. by	Greater Western Sydney 15.11 (101)	Melbourne Cricket Ground (crowd: 68,465)	Report; Stats

	Second qualifying final
Saturday, 9 September (7:25 pm)	Brisbane Lions 19.11 (125)	def.	Port Adelaide 11.11 (77)	The Gabba (crowd: 36,020)	Report; Stats
The crowd of 92,636 for the Collingwood v Melbourne qualifying final is the largest crowd for a match between the two clubs since 1964.; The crowd of 92,026 for the Carlton v Sydney elimination final is the largest ever crowd for a match between the two clubs.

=== Finals week 2 ===
	First semi-final
Friday, 15 September (7:50 pm)	Melbourne 9.17 (71)	def. by	Carlton 11.7 (73)	Melbourne Cricket Ground (crowd: 96,412)	Report; Stats

	Second semi-final
Saturday, 16 September (7:10 pm)	Port Adelaide 9.16 (70)	def. by	Greater Western Sydney 13.15 (93)	Adelaide Oval (crowd: 45,520)	Report; Stats
The crowd of 96,412 for the Melbourne v Carlton semi-final is the largest ever crowd for a match between the two clubs and Melbourne's biggest ever finals crowd outside of a grand final.

=== Finals week 3 ===
	First preliminary final
Friday, 22 September (7:50 pm)	Collingwood 8.10 (58)	def.	Greater Western Sydney 8.9 (57)	Melbourne Cricket Ground (crowd: 97,665)	Report; Stats

	Second preliminary final
Saturday, 23 September (5:15 pm)	Brisbane Lions 11.13 (79)	def.	Carlton 9.9 (63)	The Gabba (crowd: 36,012)	Report; Stats

=== Grand final ===
	Grand final
Saturday, 30 September (2:30 pm)	Collingwood 12.18 (90)	def.	Brisbane Lions 13.8 (86)	Melbourne Cricket Ground (crowd: 100,024)	Report; Stats

== Win–loss table ==
The following table can be sorted from biggest winning margin to biggest losing margin for each round. If two or more matches in a round are decided by the same margin, these margins are sorted by percentage (i.e. the lowest-scoring winning team is ranked highest and the lowest-scoring losing team is ranked lowest). Home matches are in bold, neutral matches (Gather Round) are underlined and opponents are listed above the margins.

+	Win		Qualified for finals
−	Loss		Eliminated
	Draw	X	Bye

Team	Home-and-away season																								Ladder	Finals series			
Team	1	2	3	4	5	6	7	8	9	10	11	12	13	14	15	16	17	18	19	20	21	22	23	24	Ladder	F1	F2	F3	GF
Adelaide	GWS −16	**RIC** **−32**	PA +31	**FRE** **+39**	CAR +56	HAW +3	**COL** **−1**	GEE −26	**STK** **+52**	WB −45	**BL** **+17**	GC −25	**WC** **+122**	X	COL −2	**NM** **+66**	ESS −18	**GWS** **−14**	MEL −4	**PA** **+47**	**GC** **+28**	BL −6	**SYD** **−1**	WC +45	10 (11–12–0)				
Brisbane Lions	PA −54	**MEL** **+11**	WB −14	**COL** **+33**	NM +75	GWS +21	**FRE** **+48**	CAR +26	**ESS** **+42**	**GC** **+43**	ADE −17	X	HAW −25	**SYD** **+16**	STK +28	**RIC** **+81**	**WC** **+81**	MEL −1	**GEE** **+11**	GC −41	FRE +3	**ADE** **+6**	COL +24	**STK** **+12**	2 (17–6–0)	**PA** **+48**	X	**CAR** **+16**	COL −4
Carlton	RIC; 0	**GEE** **+8**	GWS +10	NM +23	ADE −56	**STK** **−22**	WC +108	**BL** **−26**	**WB** **−20**	**COL** **−28**	SYD −26	MEL −17	**ESS** **−34**	**GC** **+59**	X	HAW +60	FRE +53	**PA** **+50**	**WC** **+71**	COL +17	STK +19	**MEL** **+4**	GC +4	**GWS** **−32**	5 (13–9–1)	**SYD** **+6**	MEL +2	BL −16	
Collingwood	GEE +22	**PA** **+71**	**RIC** **+14**	BL −33	STK +6	**ESS** **+13**	ADE +1	**SYD** **+29**	**GWS** **+65**	CAR +28	**NM** **+35**	WC +63	MEL −4	X	**ADE** **+2**	GC +78	WB +12	**FRE** **+46**	PA +2	**CAR** **−17**	HAW −32	**GEE** **+8**	**BL** **−24**	ESS +70	1 (18–5–0)	**MEL** **+7**	X	**GWS** **+1**	**BL** **+4**
Essendon	HAW +59	**GC** **+28**	STK −18	**GWS** **+13**	MEL +27	COL −13	**GEE** **−28**	PA −5	BL −42	**RIC** **+1**	WC +50	**NM** **+6**	CAR +34	X	FRE −32	**PA** **−4**	**ADE** **+18**	GEE −77	**WB** **−41**	**SYD** **−2**	**WC** **+1**	NM +9	GWS −126	**COL** **−70**	11 (11–12–0)				
Fremantle	STK −15	**NM** **−1**	**WC** **+41**	ADE −39	GC +10	**WB** **−49**	BL −48	**HAW** **+69**	SYD +17	**GEE** **+29**	MEL +7	X	**RIC** **−15**	GWS −70	**ESS** **+32**	WB −29	**CAR** **−53**	COL −46	**SYD** **−29**	GEE +7	**BL** **−3**	WC +101	**PA** **−16**	HAW +37	14 (10–13–0)				
Geelong	**COL** **−22**	CAR −8	GC −19	**HAW** **+82**	WC +47	**SYD** **+93**	ESS +28	**ADE** **+26**	RIC −24	FRE −29	**GWS** **−7**	WB +22	X	PA −38	**MEL** **+15**	SYD; 0	**NM** **+62**	**ESS** **+77**	BL −11	**FRE** **−7**	**PA** **+12**	COL −8	STK −33	**WB** **−25**	12 (10–12–1)				
Gold Coast	**SYD** **−49**	ESS −28	**GEE** **+19**	STK −53	FRE −10	**NM** **+43**	RIC +24	**MEL** **−5**	WC +70	BL −43	**WB** **+7**	**ADE** **+25**	X	CAR −59	**HAW** **+67**	**COL** **−78**	PA −33	**STK** **+26**	GWS −40	**BL** **+41**	ADE −28	SYD −24	**CAR** **−4**	NM −35	15 (9–14–0)				
Greater Western Sydney	**ADE** **+16**	WC −19	**CAR** **−10**	ESS −13	HAW +2	**BL** **−21**	SYD +1	**WB** **−15**	COL −65	**STK** **−12**	GEE +7	**RIC** **−6**	NM +28	**FRE** **+70**	X	MEL +2	**HAW** **+13**	ADE +14	**GC** **+40**	WB +5	**SYD** **−11**	PA −51	**ESS** **+126**	CAR +32	7 (13–10–0)	STK +24	PA +23	COL −1	
Hawthorn	**ESS** **−59**	SYD −81	**NM** **+19**	GEE −82	GWS −2	**ADE** **−3**	WB −29	FRE −69	**MEL** **−54**	**WC** **+116**	STK +10	PA −55	**BL** **+25**	X	GC −67	**CAR** **−60**	GWS −13	NM +48	RIC −1	**STK** **−29**	**COL** **+32**	**WB** **+3**	MEL −27	**FRE** **−37**	16 (7–16–0)				
Melbourne	**WB** **+50**	BL −11	**SYD** **+50**	WC +63	ESS −27	**RIC** **+18**	**NM** **+90**	GC +5	HAW +54	PA −4	**FRE** **−7**	**CAR** **+17**	**COL** **+4**	X	GEE −15	**GWS** **−2**	STK +21	**BL** **+1**	**ADE** **+4**	RIC +32	NM +32	CAR −4	**HAW** **+27**	SYD +21	4 (16–7–0)	COL −7	**CAR** **−2**		
North Melbourne	**WC** **+5**	FRE +1	HAW −19	**CAR** **−23**	BL −75	GC −43	MEL −90	**STK** **−30**	**PA** **−70**	**SYD** **−3**	COL −35	ESS −6	**GWS** **−28**	**WB** **−21**	X	ADE −66	GEE −62	**HAW** **−48**	STK −8	WC −5	**MEL** **−32**	**ESS** **−9**	RIC −29	**GC** **+35**	17 (3–20–0)				
Port Adelaide	**BL** **+54**	COL −71	**ADE** **−31**	SYD +2	WB +14	**WC** **+40**	STK +7	**ESS** **+5**	NM +70	**MEL** **+4**	RIC +10	**HAW** **+55**	WB +22	**GEE** **+38**	X	ESS +4	**GC** **+33**	CAR −50	**COL** **−2**	ADE −47	GEE −12	**GWS** **+51**	FRE +16	**RIC** **+31**	3 (17–6–0)	BL −48	**GWS** **−23**		
Richmond	**CAR**; **0**	ADE +32	COL −14	**WB** **−5**	SYD −44	MEL −18	**GC** **−24**	**WC** **+46**	**GEE** **+24**	ESS −1	**PA** **−10**	GWS +6	FRE +15	**STK** **+20**	X	BL −81	**SYD** **+13**	WC +38	**HAW** **+1**	**MEL** **−32**	WB −55	STK −36	**NM** **+29**	PA −31	13 (10–12–1)				
St Kilda	**FRE** **+15**	WB +51	**ESS** **+18**	**GC** **+53**	COL −6	CAR +22	**PA** **−7**	NM +30	ADE −52	GWS +12	**HAW** **−10**	X	SYD +14	RIC −20	**BL** **−28**	WC +8	**MEL** **−21**	GC −26	**NM** **+8**	HAW +29	**CAR** **−19**	**RIC** **+36**	**GEE** **+33**	BL −12	6 (13–10–0)	**GWS** **−24**			
Sydney	GC +49	**HAW** **+81**	MEL −50	**PA** **−2**	RIC +44	GEE −93	**GWS** **−1**	COL −29	**FRE** **−17**	NM +3	**CAR** **+26**	X	**STK** **−14**	BL −16	**WC** **+171**	**GEE**; **0**	RIC −13	**WB** **+2**	FRE +29	ESS +2	GWS +11	**GC** **+24**	ADE +1	**MEL** **−21**	8 (12–10–1)	CAR −6			
West Coast	NM −5	**GWS** **+19**	FRE −41	**MEL** **−63**	GEE −47	PA −40	**CAR** **−108**	RIC −46	**GC** **−70**	HAW −116	**ESS** **−50**	**COL** **−63**	ADE −122	X	SYD −171	**STK** **−8**	BL −81	**RIC** **−38**	CAR −71	**NM** **+5**	ESS −1	**FRE** **−101**	WB +7	**ADE** **−45**	18 (3–20–0)				
Western Bulldogs	MEL −50	**STK** **−51**	**BL** **+14**	RIC +5	PA −14	FRE +49	**HAW** **+29**	GWS +15	CAR +20	**ADE** **+45**	GC −7	**GEE** **−22**	**PA** **−22**	NM +21	X	**FRE** **+29**	**COL** **−12**	SYD −2	ESS +41	**GWS** **−5**	**RIC** **+55**	HAW −3	**WC** **−7**	GEE +25	9 (12–11–0)				

Source: AFL Tables

== Season notes ==
- Geelong lost its opening three matches of the season, becoming the first reigning premier since North Melbourne in 1976 to lose its first three matches the following season.
- Carlton won five consecutive matches by at least 50 points during the season, becoming the first team to do so since Geelong in 2008.
- West Coast lost five matches by over 100 points during the season, becoming the first team to do so since Greater Western Sydney in its first two seasons in 2012 and 2013; it also lost twelve consecutive matches by at least 40 points, a VFL/AFL record, during the season.
- The AFL recorded a cumulative attendance of 7,475,145 for the home-and-away season, breaking the VFL/AFL home-and-away attendance record set in 2019.
- Nine matches were attended by over 80,000 spectators (including five by over 85,000) during the home-and-away season, breaking the record of seven 80,000-plus attendances in a VFL/AFL home-and-away season set in 2013.
- Carlton qualified for its first finals appearance since 2013, eventually reaching a preliminary final for the first time since 2000.
- Geelong failed to qualify for the finals for first time since 2015.
- The AFL recorded a total club membership tally of 1,264,952 in 2023, a VFL/AFL record; 17 clubs recorded membership increases from 2022 (all clubs except Hawthorn) and 15 clubs achieved record tallies, with Collingwood (106,470) recording the largest ever club membership tally.
- Greater Western Sydney won matches at eleven different venues, a VFL/AFL record, during the season.
- The AFL recorded a cumulative attendance of 289,147 for finals week 1, breaking the VFL/AFL finals week 1 attendance record set in 2018.
- Carlton and Greater Western Sydney both reached the preliminary finals after having been in the bottom four at or beyond midseason: Greater Western Sydney was 15th after round 12, and Carlton was 15th after round 15. No team had previously achieved a comparable late-season recovery since the 1970s.
- A VFL/AFL record 57 matches (including the grand final) were decided by a margin of ten points or less, breaking the previous record of 49 matches in 2014.
- Melbourne won the McClelland Trophy, the format of which was altered to a club championship including results from both the AFL and AFL Women's 2023 seasons. Under the points system, Melbourne won 128 points with a percentage of 142.3, clear of second-place Brisbane Lions, who won 116 points and 126.4 percentage. It was Melbourne's sixth overall McClelland Trophy.

== Milestones ==
Round	Player/official/venue	Club	Milestone
1	Melbourne Cricket Ground	—	3000th VFL/AFL game hosted (Melbourne v Western Bulldogs)
1	Dylan Shiel	Essendon	200th AFL game
3	Damien Hardwick	Richmond	300th AFL game coached
3	David Swallow	Gold Coast	200th AFL game (first to play 200 games for Gold Coast)
5	Tom Liberatore	Western Bulldogs	200th AFL game
6	Todd Goldstein	North Melbourne	300th AFL game (100th VFL/AFL player to do so)
7	Marcus Bontempelli	Western Bulldogs	200th AFL game
8	Simon Meredith	—	450th AFL game umpired
9	Dion Prestia	Richmond	200th AFL game
9	Steven May	Melbourne	200th AFL game
10	Nick Vlastuin	Richmond	200th AFL game
11	Mathew Nicholls	—	400th AFL game umpired
11	Toby Greene	Greater Western Sydney	200th AFL game
11	Steele Sidebottom	Collingwood	300th AFL game
12	Luke Breust	Hawthorn	500th AFL goal
12	Jack Crisp	Collingwood	200th consecutive AFL game
13	Lance Franklin	Sydney	350th AFL game
13	Taylor Walker	Adelaide	250th AFL game
14	Trent Cotchin	Richmond	300th AFL game
15	Chris Scott	Geelong	300th AFL game coached
17	Charlie Dixon	Port Adelaide	200th AFL game
18	John Longmire	Sydney	300th AFL game coached
18	Brett Rosebury	—	500th AFL game umpired
18	Zach Merrett	Essendon	200th AFL game
18	Rory Sloane	Adelaide	250th AFL game
18	Lachie Whitfield	Greater Western Sydney	200th AFL game
18	Jack Darling	West Coast	500th AFL goal
19	Taylor Adams	Collingwood	200th AFL game
21	Nick Haynes	Greater Western Sydney	200th AFL game
21	Alastair Clarkson	North Melbourne	400th AFL game coached
22	Taylor Walker	Adelaide	600th AFL goal
23	Will Hoskin-Elliott	Collingwood	200th AFL game
23	Max Gawn	Melbourne	200th AFL game
24	Stephen Coniglio	Greater Western Sydney	200th AFL game
F1	Charlie Cameron	Brisbane Lions	200th AFL game
GF	Dayne Zorko	Brisbane Lions	250th AFL game

Source: AFL Tables (players); other milestones sourced individually

== Coach departures ==
Outgoing coach	Club	Manner of departure	Date of departure	Caretaker coach	Incoming coach	Date of appointment
Damien Hardwick	Richmond	Stepped down mid-season	23 May 2023	Andrew McQualter	Adem Yze	21 September 2023
Stuart Dew	Gold Coast	Dismissed mid-season	11 July 2023	Steven King	Damien Hardwick	21 August 2023

== Awards ==
=== Major awards ===
- The Norm Smith Medal was awarded to Collingwood's Bobby Hill.
- The Brownlow Medal was awarded to the Brisbane Lions' Lachie Neale, his second time winning the award.
- The Coleman Medal was awarded to Carlton's Charlie Curnow.
- The Goal of the Year was awarded to Port Adelaide's Dan Houston.
- The Mark of the Year was awarded to Greater Western Sydney's Harry Himmelberg.
- The AFL Rising Star was awarded to North Melbourne's Harry Sheezel.

=== Leading goalkickers ===
1	Led the goalkicking at the end of the round
1	Led the goalkicking at the end of the home-and-away season
1_{1}	Subscript indicates the player's goal tally to that point of the season
–	Did not play during that round
X	Had a bye during that round

#	Player	Club	Home-and-away season (Coleman Medal)																								Finals series				Total	Games	Average
#	Player	Club	1	2	3	4	5	6	7	8	9	10	11	12	13	14	15	16	17	18	19	20	21	22	23	24	F1	F2	F3	GF	Total	Games	Average
1	Charlie Curnow	Carlton	3_{3}	5_{8}	2_{10}	6_{16}	2_{18}	3_{21}	9_{30}	1_{31}	2_{33}	3_{36}	1_{37}	1_{38}	2_{40}	2_{42}	X_{42}	3_{45}	3_{48}	3_{51}	10_{61}	6_{67}	1_{68}	2_{70}	5_{75}	3_{78}	1_{79}	1_{80}	1_{81}		81	26	3.12
2	Taylor Walker	Adelaide	1_{1}	2_{3}	0_{3}	4_{7}	3_{10}	4_{14}	1_{15}	3_{18}	5_{23}	–_{23}	3_{26}	2_{28}	10_{38}	X_{38}	5_{43}	3_{46}	2_{48}	2_{50}	4_{54}	7_{61}	2_{63}	2_{65}	2_{67}	9_{76}					76	22	3.45
3	Nick Larkey	North Melbourne	6_{6}	4_{10}	2_{12}	0_{12}	1_{13}	1_{14}	2_{16}	3_{19}	4_{23}	2_{25}	5_{30}	2_{32}	4_{36}	3_{39}	X_{39}	3_{42}	2_{44}	1_{45}	3_{48}	2_{50}	1_{51}	5_{56}	6_{62}	9_{71}					71	23	3.09
4	Toby Greene	Greater Western Sydney	4_{4}	4_{8}	1_{9}	2_{11}	3_{14}	2_{16}	4_{20}	–_{20}	–_{20}	2_{22}	4_{26}	3_{29}	3_{32}	4_{36}	X_{36}	2_{38}	0_{38}	3_{41}	3_{44}	5_{49}	3_{52}	2_{54}	2_{56}	4_{60}	1_{61}	3_{64}	2_{66}		66	24	2.75
5	Joe Daniher	Brisbane Lions	1_{1}	4_{5}	0_{5}	2_{7}	5_{12}	1_{13}	3_{16}	2_{18}	6_{24}	4_{28}	2_{30}	X_{30}	0_{30}	2_{32}	2_{34}	5_{39}	0_{39}	2_{41}	2_{43}	0_{43}	2_{45}	1_{46}	3_{49}	2_{51}	5_{56}	X_{56}	2_{58}	3_{61}	61	26	2.35
6	Charlie Cameron	Brisbane Lions	0_{0}	2_{2}	1_{3}	6_{9}	4_{13}	7_{20}	2_{22}	4_{26}	0_{26}	2_{28}	4_{32}	X_{32}	2_{34}	0_{34}	1_{35}	2_{37}	0_{37}	2_{39}	1_{40}	2_{42}	2_{44}	3_{47}	4_{51}	2_{53}	2_{55}	X_{55}	1_{56}	3_{59}	59	26	2.27
7	Oscar Allen	West Coast	2_{2}	2_{4}	3_{7}	3_{10}	4_{14}	2_{16}	2_{18}	4_{22}	2_{24}	1_{25}	4_{29}	3_{32}	1_{33}	X_{33}	2_{35}	2_{37}	1_{38}	3_{41}	0_{41}	2_{43}	2_{45}	1_{46}	3_{49}	4_{53}					53	23	2.30
7	Jeremy Cameron	Geelong	2_{2}	6_{8}	3_{11}	7_{18}	4_{22}	5_{27}	3_{30}	3_{33}	1_{34}	0_{34}	2_{36}	2_{38}	X_{38}	1_{39}	0_{39}	–_{39}	–_{39}	1_{40}	3_{43}	1_{44}	2_{46}	7_{53}	0_{53}	–_{53}					53	20	2.65
9	Kyle Langford	Essendon	0_{0}	5_{5}	1_{6}	1_{7}	2_{9}	3_{12}	0_{12}	2_{14}	2_{16}	1_{17}	3_{20}	4_{24}	1_{25}	X_{25}	1_{26}	3_{29}	3_{32}	1_{33}	2_{35}	5_{40}	5_{45}	3_{48}	2_{50}	1_{51}					51	23	2.22
10	Tom Hawkins	Geelong	2_{2}	1_{3}	0_{3}	2_{5}	4_{9}	5_{14}	8_{22}	1_{23}	3_{26}	3_{29}	1_{30}	2_{32}	X_{32}	2_{34}	1_{35}	2_{37}	3_{40}	5_{45}	0_{45}	2_{47}	–_{47}	–_{47}	2_{49}	–_{49}					49	20	2.45
10	Jesse Hogan	Greater Western Sydney	3_{3}	3_{6}	2_{8}	0_{8}	2_{10}	2_{12}	2_{14}	2_{16}	3_{19}	2_{21}	0_{21}	1_{22}	2_{24}	–_{24}	X_{24}	0_{24}	4_{28}	1_{29}	–_{29}	–_{29}	2_{31}	1_{32}	9_{41}	1_{42}	2_{44}	4_{48}	1_{49}		49	23	2.13

Source: AFL Tables

=== Club best and fairest ===
Player(s)	Club	Award	Ref.
Jordan Dawson	Adelaide	Malcolm Blight Medal	
Harris Andrews	Brisbane Lions	Merrett–Murray Medal	
Jacob Weitering	Carlton	John Nicholls Medal	
Josh Daicos	Collingwood	Copeland Trophy	
Zach Merrett	Essendon	Crichton Medal	
Caleb Serong	Fremantle	Doig Medal	
Tom Stewart	Geelong	Carji Greeves Medal	
Noah Anderson	Gold Coast	Club Champion	
Toby Greene	Greater Western Sydney	Kevin Sheedy Medal	
Will Day	Hawthorn	Peter Crimmins Medal	
Christian Petracca	Melbourne	Keith 'Bluey' Truscott Trophy	
Harry Sheezel	North Melbourne	Syd Barker Medal	
Zak Butters	Port Adelaide	John Cahill Medal	
Tim Taranto	Richmond	Jack Dyer Medal	
Jack Sinclair	St Kilda	Trevor Barker Award	
Errol Gulden	Sydney	Bob Skilton Medal	
Tim Kelly	West Coast	John Worsfold Medal	
Marcus Bontempelli	Western Bulldogs	Charles Sutton Medal	

== See also ==
- 2023 AFL Women's season

== Sources ==
- 2023 AFL season at afl.com.au
- 2023 AFL season at AFL Tables
- 2023 AFL season at Australian Football
- 2023 AFL season at Austadiums
