= Geoff Linke =

Australian rules footballer

Personal information
- Full name: Geoff Linke
- Born: 21 November 1955 (age 70)
- Original team: South Adelaide (SANFL)
- Draft: No. 15, 1981 interstate draft
- Height: 181 cm (5 ft 11 in)
- Weight: 83 kg (183 lb)

Playing career^{1}
Years	Club	Games (Goals)
1982	St Kilda	2 (3)
	South Adelaide	110 (286)
- ^{1} Playing statistics correct to the end of 1982.

Geoff Linke (born 21 November 1955) is a former Australian rules footballer who played with St Kilda in the Victorian Football League (VFL) and South Adelaide in the South Australian National Football League (SANFL).

Linke was drafted by St Kilda in the inaugural VFL Draft in 1981 by badly injured his knee in his second match for St Kilda. After missing the rest of the 1982 VFL season, Linke aggravated his knee injury while training in the 1983 pre-season, requiring further surgery.
