= Dean Turner (footballer) =

Australian rules footballer

Personal information
- Full name: Dean Turner
- Born: 6 October 1959 (age 67)
- Original team: East Perth (WAFL)
- Draft: No. 9, 1981 interstate draft
- Height: 178 cm (5 ft 10 in)
- Weight: 80 kg (176 lb)
- Position: Utility

Playing career^{1}
Years	Club	Games (Goals)
1978–1991	East Perth	143 (128)
1984–1986	Fitzroy	54 (19)
1987–1990	West Coast	56 (28)
Total		243 (175)
- ^{1} Playing statistics correct to the end of 1990.

Career highlights
- East Perth best and fairest 1981

Dean Turner (born 6 October 1959) is a former Australian rules footballer who played with Fitzroy and the West Coast Eagles in the Victorian/Australian Football League (VFL/AFL).

Turner came to East Perth from the Boyanup Capel Dardanup Football Club in rural Western Australia (now the Eaton Boomers). He made his Western Australian National Football League (WAFL) debut in 1978 and won the F. D. Book Medal as East Perth's 'Best and Fairest' player in 1981.

Fitzroy acquired his services in 1984 and he spent three seasons with the VFL club. He appeared in four finals and in 1986 had 361 disposals. A utility, he was often used on the wing.

He joined the inaugural squad of the West Coast Eagles in 1987 and played 17 games that year. He retired after playing in West Coast's preliminary final loss to Essendon in 1990. During this time he also appeared for East Perth and finished with 143 WAFL games.
