= Scott Knight =

Australian rules footballer

Personal information
- Full name: Scott Knight
- Born: 28 April 1959 (age 67); King Island, Tasmania, Australia
- Original team: North Launceston (NTFA)
- Draft: No. 23, 1981 interstate draft

Playing career^{1}
Years	Club	Games (Goals)
1984	Collingwood	5 (2)
- ^{1} Playing statistics correct to the end of 1984.

Scott Knight (born 28 April 1959 in King Island, Tasmania) is a former Australian rules footballer who played for Collingwood in the Victorian Football League (VFL) in 1984.

== Biography ==
He was recruited from the North Launceston Football Club in the Northern Tasmanian Football League with the second last selection in the first ever VFL Draft in 1981.

He is originally from King Island, Tasmania. His son, Matthew, plays basketball for the Perth Wildcats of the National Basketball League.
