= Gather Round =

Australian Football League weekend in which all fixtures are played in one city

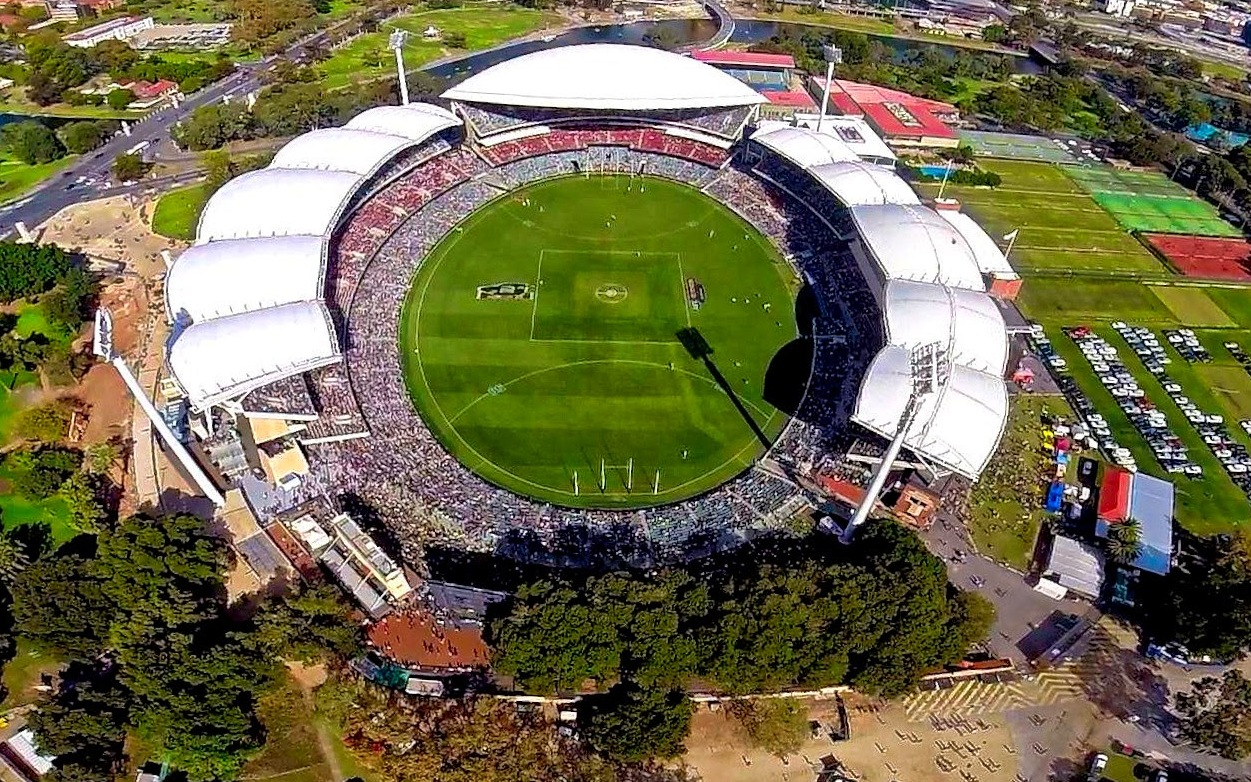
Adelaide Oval, the main stadium used for the event

Gather Round is an annual Australian Football League event in which all games in one home-and-away round are played in a single city and its surrounds. The event was first held in 2023 in Adelaide, South Australia, which is the host city of the event until 2029.

== History ==
In September 2022, the Australian Football League (AFL) announced that in 2023 it would hold a promotional round in which all matches would be played in a single city outside of Victoria. The AFL's major competitor, the National Rugby League (NRL), had staged such a round, known as Magic Round, since 2019 in which all matches were played at Suncorp Stadium, Brisbane; while another competing competition, Super Rugby Pacific, had held a Super Round since 2022, in which all matches were played at AAMI Park. The two rugby competitions' rounds were in turn based on its European rugby league counterpart, the Super League, which had staged Magic Weekend in a variety of cities since 2007. In November 2022, the inaugural round was awarded to South Australia, with the South Australian government beating a bid from New South Wales. In December 2022, it was given the pun name "Gather Round" with the tagline "a festival of footy".

Unlike its rugby equivalents, Gather Round matches are all scheduled for the same city, but not the same venue. In the inaugural edition, for example: six games were played at Adelaide Oval, Adelaide's only regular AFL venue; two games were played at the suburban Norwood Oval; and one game was played at Summit Sports Park in Mount Barker, about 30km outside Adelaide in the surrounding Adelaide Hills.

In the inaugural event, all nine Gather Round matches sold out, and more than 60,000 people purchased tickets from interstate. On the final day of the first Gather Round, South Australia was announced as the event's host for the next three seasons until 2026. Following the 2026 event, South Australia won a further extension of the deal until 2029.

== Arrangements ==
Gather Round was added to the AFL home-and-away season as an extra round, extending the length of the standard season from 22 matches to 23. It is run as an AFL event, meaning that there is no designated home team for gate purposes, that club memberships do not grant entry to the games, and that usual club member reserved seating does not apply – although club members are given access to redeem a free ticket. Home team designations for match day purposes – which include choice of uniforms, change rooms and run-on order – are decided by a coin toss.

In 2023 and 2024, matches at the same venue on the same day were staged as ticketed double-headers, with a single ticket granting access to both matches. Ticketed double-headers were removed in 2025, with all matches now ticketed separately.

== List of Gather Rounds ==
Season	Round	Dates	City	Venues (matches)	Attendance
2023	Round 5	13–16 April	Adelaide, South Australia	Adelaide Oval (6), Norwood Oval (2), Summit Sports Park (1)	268,287 (ave. 29,810 per match)
2024	Round 4	4−7 April	Adelaide, South Australia	Adelaide Oval (5), Norwood Oval (2), Summit Sports Park (2)	267,643 (ave. 29,738 per match)
2025	Round 5	10−13 April	Adelaide, South Australia	Adelaide Oval (5), Norwood Oval (2), Barossa Park (2)	269,506 (ave. 29,945 per match)
2026	Round 5	9−12 April	Adelaide, South Australia	Adelaide Oval (5), Norwood Oval (2), Barossa Park (2)	270,018 (ave. 30,002 per match)

== Other Gather Round events ==
From 2024 through 2026, an interstate game between the South Australian National Football League (SANFL) and Victorian Football League (VFL) was scheduled as part of the weekend. Starting from 2025, a women's match between the two leagues has also been held.

From 2027, a parade featuring players from all 18 clubs will be incorporated into the festivities.

== See also ==
- 1952 VFL season § National Day Round, a similar promotional round of home-and-away matches played across Australia during the 1952 VFL season
- Magic Round (NRL), the equivalent event in the National Rugby League since 2019
- Super Round, the equivalent event in the Super Rugby Pacific since 2022
- Unite Round, the equivalent event in the A-League Men and Women since 2024
