= 1981 VFL draft =

Draft for the Victorian Football League

The 1981 VFL draft was the first annual national draft held by the Victorian Football League, the leading Australian rules football league.

Held on 8 October 1981, all twelve VFL clubs participated in the draft, each having two picks, with the team finishing last in the 1981 VFL season having first choice, followed by the other eleven clubs in reverse finishing position order. Wooden spooners Melbourne named Perth wingman Alan Johnson as the first pick of the draft.

Round	Pick	Player	Drafted to	Recruited from	League	Games with new team
1	1	Alan Johnson	Melbourne	Perth	WAFL	135
1	2	Neil Craig	Footscray	Sturt	SANFL	0
1	3	Grant Campbell	St Kilda	East Perth	WAFL	0
1	4	Mark Naley	South Melbourne	South Adelaide	SANFL	0
1	5	Craig Holden	North Melbourne	Swan Districts	WAFL	29
1	6	Peter Hofner	Richmond	Port Adelaide	SANFL	0
1	7	Ken Judge	Hawthorn	East Fremantle	WAFL	72
1	8	Wayne Otway	Essendon	East Perth	WAFL	36
1	9	Dean Turner	Fitzroy	East Perth	WAFL	54
1	10	Tony McGuinness	Geelong	Glenelg	SANFL	0
1	11	Chris Carpenter	Collingwood	Launceston	NTFA	0
1	12	Ross Ditchburn	Carlton	Claremont	WAFL	28
2	13	Danny Hughes	Melbourne	Port Adelaide	SANFL	124
2	14	Trevor Clisby	Footscray	North Adelaide	SANFL	0
2	15	Geoff Linke	St Kilda	South Adelaide	SANFL	2
2	16	Phil Brooksby	South Melbourne	South Adelaide	SANFL	0
2	17	Tom Warhurst	North Melbourne	Norwood	SANFL	0
2	18	David Tiller	Richmond	North Adelaide	SANFL	0
2	19	John Platten	Hawthorn	Central District	SANFL	258
2	20	Stephen Copping	Essendon	Glenelg	SANFL	42
2	21	Chris McDermott	Fitzroy	Glenelg	SANFL	0
2	22	Greg McAdam	Geelong	North Adelaide	SANFL	0
2	23	Scott Knight	Collingwood	Launceston	NTFA	5
2	24	Chris Velde	Carlton	Glenelg	SANFL	0
