= Lyndoch Recreation Park =

Sports ground in Barossa Valley region of South Australia

Barossa Park
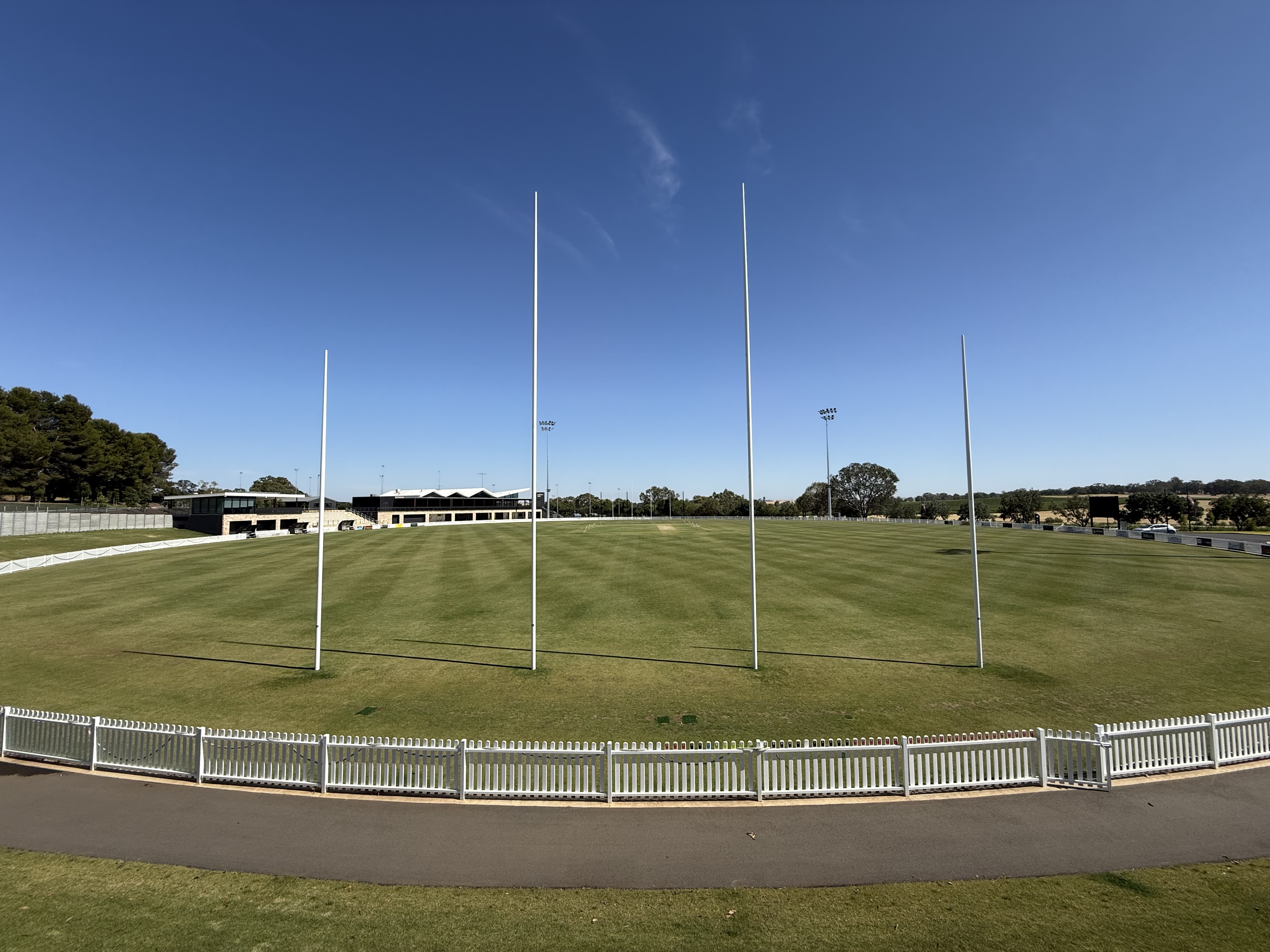
- Lyndoch Recreation Park, January 2026
- Interactive map of Barossa Park
- Full name: Lyndoch Recreation Park
- Location: Barossa Valley Way, Lyndoch SA 5351
- Coordinates: 34.597939392005784°S 138.88583503180686°E
- Capacity: 10,000
- Surface: Grass

Construction
- Opened: 2025 (redevelopment)

Tenants
- Barossa District FNC (BLGFA); Gather Round (AFL) (2025–present)

Lyndoch Recreation Park, also known as Barossa Park, is a sports oval in Lyndoch, a town in the Barossa Valley region of South Australia. The ground is used for Australian rules football and other sports, and hosted Australian Football League (AFL) matches as part of the competition's annual Gather Round in 2025.

== Redevelopment ==
Following the first two years of the AFL's annual Gather Round, the league and South Australian government began looking to move two fixtures in the round to the Barossa Valley region, after successfully hosting matches at Summit Sports Park in Mount Barker. In April 2024 the state government and Barossa Council announced they would jointly fund a $40 million redevelopment of Lyndoch Recreation Park to make the venue suitable for hosting AFL matches. The upgrade of the oval was accompanied by another recreation green space supporting relocation of athletics and a new multi-purpose building comprising a 300-seat event space, commercial kitchen, clubroom, change facilities and gym. Tennis and netball courts were also installed adjacent to the oval.

The redevelopment was completed in March 2025. The first two AFL premiership matches played at the venue were North Melbourne vs Gold Coast and Richmond vs Fremantle on 12 and 13 April 2025 respectively.
