= Tom Warhurst Jr. =

Australian rules footballer

Tom Warhurst

Personal information
- Full name: Thomas P. F. Warhurst
- Born: 17 February 1963 (age 63)
- Original team: Norwood (SANFL)
- Draft: No. 17, 1981 interstate draft
- Height: 192 cm (6 ft 4 in)
- Weight: 86 kg (190 lb)

Playing career^{1}
Years	Club	Games (Goals)
1981–1991	Norwood	246
1991	Adelaide	2 (0)
- ^{1} Playing statistics correct to the end of 1991.

Thomas P. F. Warhurst (born 17 February 1963) is a former Australian rules footballer who played for the Norwood Football Club in the South Australian National Football League (SANFL) and the Adelaide Football Club in the Australian Football League (AFL). He is referred to as Tom Warhurst Jr. to distinguish him from his father, Tom Warhurst Sr., although the latter was born Hubert Thomas Warhurst.

Warhurst had already played over 200 SANFL games when he was signed by Adelaide for their debut season in 1991. He had previously been twice recruited by VFL clubs, but on each occasion decided to stay at Norwood. A three time South Australian representative, Warhurst was a member of Norwood's 1982 and 1984 premiership teams.

He took part in Adelaide's first AFL game, against Hawthorn at Football Park, where he kept key forward Dermott Brereton goal-less in a convincing win for the club. The 28-year-old played again the following round, in a loss to Carlton, but did not make any further appearance for Adelaide. It was also his last season of senior football as he needed a knee reconstruction at the year's end.

His father, Tom and his brother, John, were also Norwood footballers but are better known for their other careers. His father was a leading tennis player and his brother is a noted academic and republican activist.
