= Summit Sport and Recreation Park =

Multi-purpose community sports facility in Mount Barker, South Australia

Summit Sports Park
- Adelaide Hills
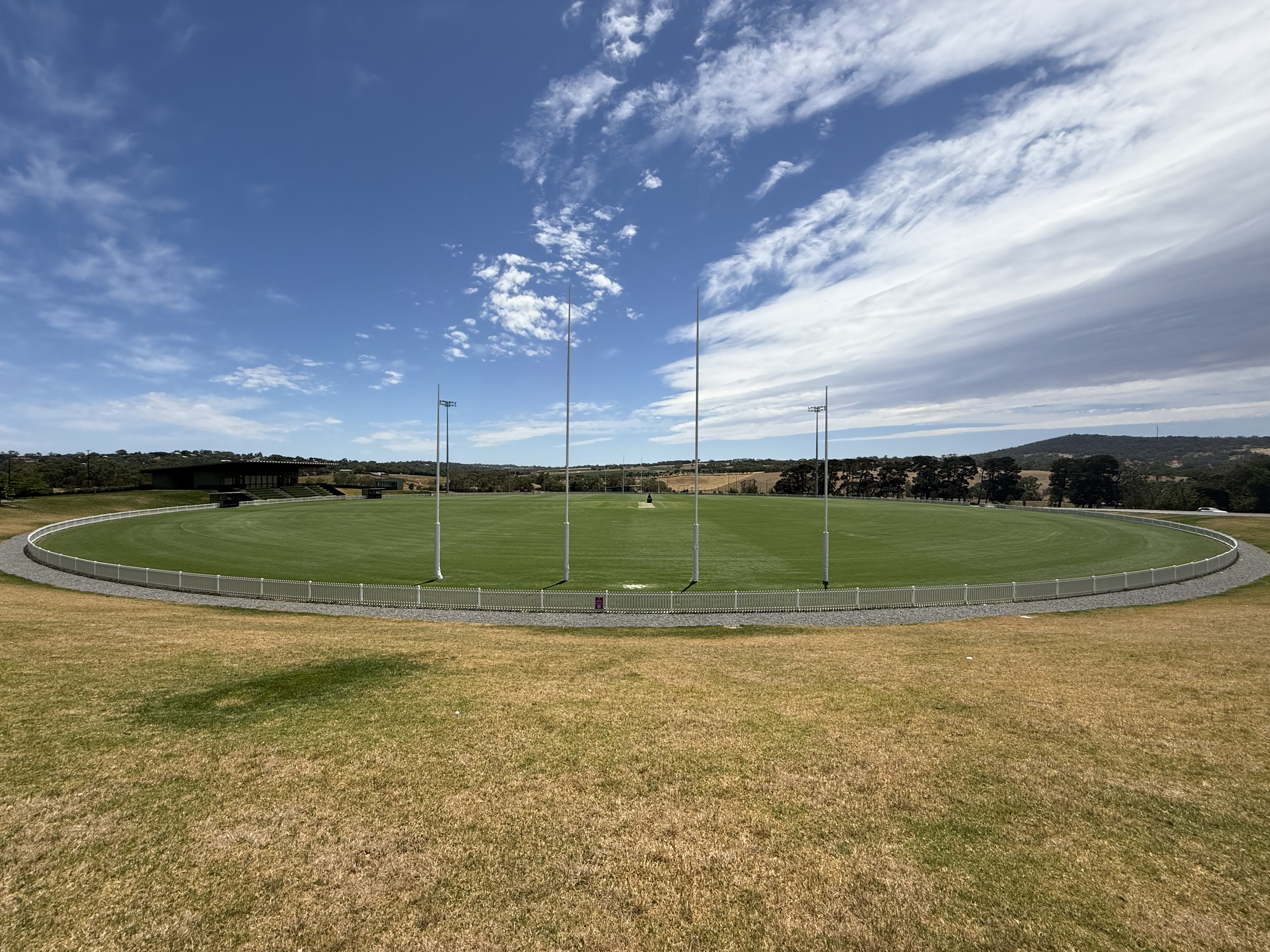
- Summit Sport and Recreation Park, January 2026
- Interactive map of Summit Sports Park
- Full name: Summit Sport and Recreation Park
- Address: 304 Springs Road; Mount Barker, South Australia; Australia
- Coordinates: 35°04′41″S 138°53′36″E
- Owner: Mount Barker District Council
- Operator: Mount Barker District Council
- Capacity: Standard: 5,000 (270 seated); Temporary: 7,500 (3,000 seated)
- Type: Multi-purpose stadium
- Surface: Grass (oval), artificial turf (rectangular pitches)
- Record attendance: 9,337 (AFL round 4, Gold Coast vs. Greater Western Sydney, 7 April 2024)
- Field size: 160m x 141m (oval)

Construction
- Groundbreaking: December 2019
- Opened: 29 April 2021
- Cost: A$23 million

Tenant
- Mount Barker United (FSA)

Summit Sport and Recreation Park is a multi-purpose community sports facility located in Mount Barker, South Australia. The $23 million complex officially opened in April 2021, and features a turf Australian rules football and cricket oval alongside two synthetic soccer pitches. It is best known for hosting Australian Football League (AFL) matches as part of Gather Round; the AFL refers to the venue as Adelaide Hills (for the nearby region) in its promotional material. The capacity of the main oval is nominally 5,000, which includes a 270-seat undercover grandstand. However, this capacity can be increased to 7,500 during Gather Round via additional temporary seating. The venue is also utilised by State League 2 South Australia club Mount Barker United SC, with annual visits from the Adelaide United youth team. The ground no longer hosts AFL matches as it was replaced by Barossa Park in 2025.

== Background ==
In 2008, the Mount Barker District Council purchased 36 hectares of land on the corner of Bald Hills Road and Springs Road in Mount Barker prior to 2017 to house infrastructure which would support the population growth of the area. In 2014, Council commenced detailed concept designs in collaboration with the South Australian Office for Recreation and Sport. By December 2017, a business case for the proposed Mount Barker Regional Sports Hub had been put forward, with the intention for construction to commence during 2019–20, and the facility to open during 2020–21. In February 2018, the Council appointed landscape architects Oxygen as the design consultant for the facility. Numerous funding announcements were made in the months following, including a $3.75 million promise from the Turnbull government in August 2018 if re-elected.

Planning approval for construction of the site was eventually granted by Council on 7 May 2019. The construction contract was granted to Sarah Constructions in December 2019; initial works began shortly after. The complex was officially opened on 29 April 2021.
