= Tony McGuinness (footballer) =

Australian rules footballer (born 1964)

Personal information
- Born: 6 May 1964 (age 62); Adelaide, South Australia
- Original team: Glenelg (SANFL)
- Draft: No. 10, 1981 interstate draft
- Debut: Round 1, 1986, Footscray vs. St Kilda, at Western Oval
- Height: 176 cm (5 ft 9 in)
- Weight: 76 kg (12 st 0 lb)
- Position: Rover

Playing career^{1}
Years	Club	Games (Goals)
1981–85, 1998	Glenelg	103 (184) (Note: These totals refer to premiership matches (home-and-away and finals matches) only.)
1986–90	Footscray	109 (108)
1991–96	Adelaide	113 (79)
Total		325 (371)

Representative team honours
Years	Team	Games (Goals)
	South Australia	12 (?)

Coaching career
Years	Club	Games (W–L–D)
1998–2000	Glenelg	62 (20–42–0)
- ^{1} Playing statistics correct to the end of 1998.

Career highlights
- Club: Adelaide captain: 1995–96; Malcolm Blight Medal: 1993; Adelaide Team of the Decade – Follower; Charles Sutton Medal: 1987; Glenelg best and fairest: 1982; Glenelg Football Club Hall of Fame; Adelaide life member; Representative: 2× National Football Carnival championship: 1988, 1993; Overall: SANFL premiership: 1985; 3× All-Australian team: 1988, 1992, 1993; Magarey Medal: 1982; South Australian Football Hall of Fame (inaugural inductee)

Anthony McGuinness (born 6 May 1964 in Adelaide, South Australia) is a former Australian rules football player who played for Footscray and Adelaide in the VFL/AFL. His wife is former Nine News Adelaide presenter Georgina McGuinness.

== SANFL career ==
McGuinness proved his skills early in his career with leading SANFL club Glenelg, winning the Magarey Medal in 1982 at the age of 18. A dynamic and pacy left-footed rover, he featured strongly in Glenelg's 1985 premiership victory against North Adelaide, kicking 2 goals.

== VFL/AFL career ==
Like his Glenelg premiership teammate Stephen Kernahan, McGuinness then accepted the invitation to play in the more lucrative Victorian Football League. He was drafted as early as 1981 by Geelong as the tenth choice in the first ever VFL draft, but the Cats could never convince McGuinness to move to Victoria, so their hold lapsed by 1984.

McGuinness was then signed by Footscray and quickly justified his huge reputation. In five seasons at the Bulldogs, McGuinness missed only one game and consistently racked up many possessions, usually distributing it with precision by hand or by his trusty left foot. He stood out in an otherwise mediocre team, especially in wet weather, and won the club best and fairest award in 1987.

After a particularly fine 1990 season, in which he was a key member of the Bulldogs' revival, McGuinness decided to return to South Australia in 1991 to play with the newly formed Adelaide Crows. He was appointed the club's first vice-captain and holds the honour of both captaining The Crows in their first ever game (a pre-season trial game win over Essendon in front of over 45,000 at Football Park) and of kicking the first-ever goal for Adelaide in the AFL season proper against Hawthorn, again at Footy Park. McGuinness was Vice-Captain of the Crows for that game with former Glenelg teammate Chris McDermott taking over as captain. He would remain the Crows' vice-captain from 1991 until 1994.

In 1993, Adelaide made the finals for the first time, only to lose to eventual premiers Essendon in a famous Preliminary Final. Adelaide led The Bombers by 42 points at half-time but Essendon came back to win their way into the 1993 AFL Grand Final against Carlton by 11 points. McGuinness had an outstanding season, racking up 657 disposals (477 kicks, 180 handballs, the highest disposal count in his 11-year AFL career), and was recognised with his third All-Australian selection. After finishing second in both 1991 and 1992, McGuinness won the Crows Club Champion award as Adelaide's best and fairest player in 1993.

He became captain for the 1995 and 1996 seasons but along with a number of other older and experienced players, he was delisted at end of the 1996 season by newly appointed Crows coach Malcolm Blight, ending his AFL playing career. History shows that while Blight copped a lot of criticism for axing so many established players, Adelaide went on to win their first AFL Premiership in 1997 over St Kilda and repeated as premiers in 1998 by defeating North Melbourne.

In May 1996, Tony McGuinness and long time Glenelg, South Australian and Crows teammate Chris McDermott set up the McGuinness–McDermott Foundation which was launched in memory of five-year-old Nicholas Berry, and seven-year-old Nathan Maclean who died of cancer. The Foundation raises funds to improve oncology treatment for South Australian children.

== VFL / AFL career statistics summary ==
Statistics are correct as of the end of 2010

Season	Team	No.	Games	Kicks	Marks	Handballs	Goals	Behinds	Disposals	Brownlow Votes
1986	Footscray	11	22	273	32	108	28	22	381	6
1987	Footscray	11	22	369	53	145	34	34	514	15
1988	Footscray	11	21	353	55	107	13	23	460	13
1989	Footscray	11	22	365	43	119	14	16	484	9
1990	Footscray	11	22	412	44	148	19	26	560	14
1991	Adelaide	11	21	348	25	145	17	11	493	8
1992	Adelaide	11	19	337	30	140	26	29	477	3
1993	Adelaide	11	23	477	59	180	12	21	657	11
1994	Adelaide	11	21	352	38	148	14	8	500	8
1995	Adelaide	11	11	136	10	45	4	5	181	1
1996	Adelaide	11	18	261	41	81	6	17	342	5
Totals			222	3683	430	1366	187	190	5049	93

== Post-retirement ==
McGuinness returned to his original club Glenelg as a coach from 1998 to 2000, but had little success, finishing last, fourth, and last respectively in a nine-team competition. With the Tigers decimated by injuries in 1998 McGuinness came out of retirement for a game at the age of 34.

Subsequently, he commenced as an assistant coach at Port Adelaide Power in 2005. He resigned from this position at the end of the 2006 season, citing outside business interests and wanting to spend more time with his family.

McGuinness resigned from the McGuinness–McDermott Foundation on 17 August 2010. He also ran a sports retail business, Rowe and Jarman, which he sold to Amart Sports in 2006.
