= Chris McDermott =

Australian rules footballer (born 1963)

Chris McDermott OAM

Personal information
- Nickname: Bone
- Born: 4 November 1963 (age 62)
- Original team: Glenelg (SANFL)
- Draft: No. 21, 1981 interstate draft No. 2, 1987 national draft
- Height: 182 cm (6 ft 0 in)
- Weight: 92 kg (203 lb)

Playing career^{1}
| Years | Club | Games (Goals) |
| 1981–1996 | Glenelg | 227 (154) |
| 1991–1996 | Adelaide | 117 (25) |
| 1997 | North Adelaide | 10 (0) |
| Total | | 354 (179) |

Representative team honours
| Years | Team | Games (Goals) |
| | South Australia | 15 |

Coaching career
| Years | Club | Games (W–L–D) |
| 1997–2000 | North Adelaide | |
- ^{1} Playing statistics correct to the end of 1997.

Career highlights
- Club: 3x All-Australian team: 1986, 1987, 1992 (captain); 2x SANFL Premiership player: 1985, 1986; 3x Glenelg best and fairest: 1986–1988; Malcolm Blight Medal: 1992; Adelaide captain: 1991–1994; Glenelg captain: 1988–1990; Adelaide Team of the Decade - Follower; South Australian Football Hall of Fame (inaugural); Glenelg Hall of Fame; Adelaide life member (inaugural); Adelaide Football Club Hall Of Fame; Representative: 2x National Football Carnival championship: 1988, 1993; Fos Williams Medal: 1987; Simpson Medal: 1987; 8x South Australia captain

Christopher Stephen McDermott OAM (born 4 November 1963) is a former professional Australian rules footballer who played for the Adelaide Football Club in the Australian Football League (AFL), and the Glenelg Football Club and North Adelaide Football Club in the South Australian National Football League (SANFL). After retirement from football, in 1996 he co-founded the Little Heroes Foundation, which raises funds to provide oncology treatment for South Australian children. Among other honours, McDermott was an inaugural inductee into the South Australian Football Hall of Fame in 2002, and in 2025 was the recipient of an Order of Australia Medal. He stood as the lead candidate of Fair Go for Australia in the Legislative Council in the 2026 South Australian state election.

== Early life and education ==
Christopher Stephen McDermott was born on 4 November 1963.

== Career ==
=== Football ===
He was initially signed by Victorian Football Club (VFL) club Fitzroy in 1981, but stayed in the SANFL with Glenelg after the South Australian player retention scheme was developed to pay top players to remain in South Australia.

He was also chased by Carlton, and eventually drafted by Brisbane in 1986, but still did not make his VFL debut. He ultimately played 227 premiership games and 50 pre-season/night series matches for Glenelg.

In 1990, with talks of Port Adelaide becoming the South Australian team in the national competition, that McDermott looked to Victoria for another club. However, when it became clear that the Adelaide Crows were going to be South Australia's entry into the AFL, he remained in his home state and became the inaugural captain of the Crows.

McDermott is commonly referred to as "Bone", a nickname referring to the damage done to his nose due to excessive facial trauma experienced whilst playing in both the SANFL and AFL.

==== Matches and records ====
At the time of his retirement, McDermott's career total of 354 premiership matches was ranked fourth in South Australian elite football behind longtime Glenelg teammate Peter Carey (423), Russell Ebert (367), and longtime coach Graham Cornes (356): as of February 2026, he is ranked seventh behind them, as well as Travis Boak (394), Tyson Edwards and Andrew McLeod (both 363).

McDermott also played 15 State of Origin matches for South Australia and a total of 62 pre-season/night series matches, 50 for Glenelg and 12 for Adelaide (these are counted as senior by the SANFL but not the VFL/AFL). If these are included, McDermott played a total of 431 senior career games.

The VFL/AFL lists McDermott's total as 419, excluding his pre-season/night series matches for Adelaide. Depending on the viewpoint taken, his total career senior games ranks tenth (using the VFL/AFL's total or his overall total) in elite Australian rules football, and ranks either third behind Carey (467) and Ebert (421) or second behind Carey in South Australian elite football.

==== Coaching ====
McDermott served as playing coach for North Adelaide in 1997, playing ten games for the club, and then as non-playing coach from 1998 to 2000.

=== Post-football ===
McDermott set up the Little Heroes Foundation, which raises funds to provide oncology treatment for South Australian children, with fellow former Crows team-mate Tony McGuinness, in 1996, and has continued as chair of the organisation.

In July 2014 McDermott became a football and sports commentator for Adelaide talkback radio station FIVEaa and hosted the station's weekday drive-time sports show with another former Adelaide Crows player, Stephen Rowe. In November 2014 McDermott was replaced on FIVEAA by former Adelaide Crows dual premiership captain, Mark Bickley.

In January 2026 it was announced that McDermott would be standing as Sarah Game's Fair Go for Australia lead candidate for the Legislative Council in the 2026 South Australian state election. 10 days before the election, McDermott announced that he had quit the party and would become an independent if he is elected.

== Recognition and honours ==
In 2002 McDermott was an inaugural inductee into the South Australian Football Hall of Fame.

McDermott was awarded an Order of Australia Medal (OAM) in the 2025 King's Birthday Honours for service to Australian rules football, and to the community.

Other awards and recognition include:

- Fos Williams Medal, South Australian National Football League, 1987
- Malcolm Blight Medal, Adelaide Football Club, 1992
- Australian Sports Medal, 2000
- Inductee, Adelaide Football Club Hall of Fame, 2021
- Inductee, Glenelg Football Club Hall of Fame, 2023
- Inductee, Australian Football Hall of Fame, 2024

== Personal life ==
Australian stand-up comedian and host of the Channel 10 program Good News Week, Paul McDermott, is his first cousin. His grandfather was Les Dayman, an inductee into the SANFL Hall of Fame.
