= Little Heroes Foundation =

Australian charity

The Little Heroes Foundation, previously the McGuinness McDermott Foundation, was launched in May 1996 in memory of five-year-old Nicholas Berry, and seven-year-old Nathan Maclean who died of cancer. The Foundation raises funds to improve oncology treatment for South Australian children. The Foundation was established by former Adelaide Football Club players Tony McGuinness and Chris McDermott.

== Projects ==
Oncology treatment for children in South Australia is chiefly undertaken at the Women's and Children's Hospital, North Adelaide. The majority of the Foundation's activities aim to support the hospital in its treatment of cancer.

The Foundation has undertaken or provided support to a number of projects including:

- Extensions to the Ronald McDonald Children's Clinic
- Establishment of the Brookman Cancer Ward
- Extensions to the Dialysis Unit
- Improvements to the Adolescent Ward
- Purchase of an x-ray machine and refurbishment of the medical imaging rooms
- Upgrading of the holding bay in Paediatric Theatres
- Upgrading the Endocrinology and Diabetes Centre
- The purchase of a HPLC machine for the Gastroenterology Unit
- The purchase of the MRI scanner
- Endoscopic Theatre Suite Redevelopment

== Fundraising activities ==
The Foundation raises funds through a variety of means ranging from direct donations, sale of specialised merchandise, to special events – often with a sporting theme.

The most widely publicised event is the "Slow Down". Slow Down is an annual Australian rules football match held at the end of the regular season, with teams drawn mostly from ex-AFL and SANFL players. The players competing are loosely aligned to the two Adelaide-based AFL sides: Adelaide Crows and Port Adelaide Power. The name "Slow Down" is a play on words to the local football derby between Adelaide and Port Adelaide, which is promoted as a "Showdown". For a gold coin entrance fee spectators enjoy a lighthearted game where entertainment is more the aim than the actual outcome on the scoreboard. Attendance in 2005 was over 30,000.

Other fund-raising activities include charity golf events, special event Luncheons, and sales from specialist items such as modified versions of the board games Monopoly and Trivial Pursuit.

== Controversy ==
Financial reports for the McGuinness McDermott Foundation in 2007–08, obtained by The Advertiser from the Office of Consumer and Business Affairs, shows that part of the funds raised for the McGuinness McDermott Foundation were being used to lease a BMW X5 and Mercedes CLK 280.
