= Malcolm Blight Medal =

Award

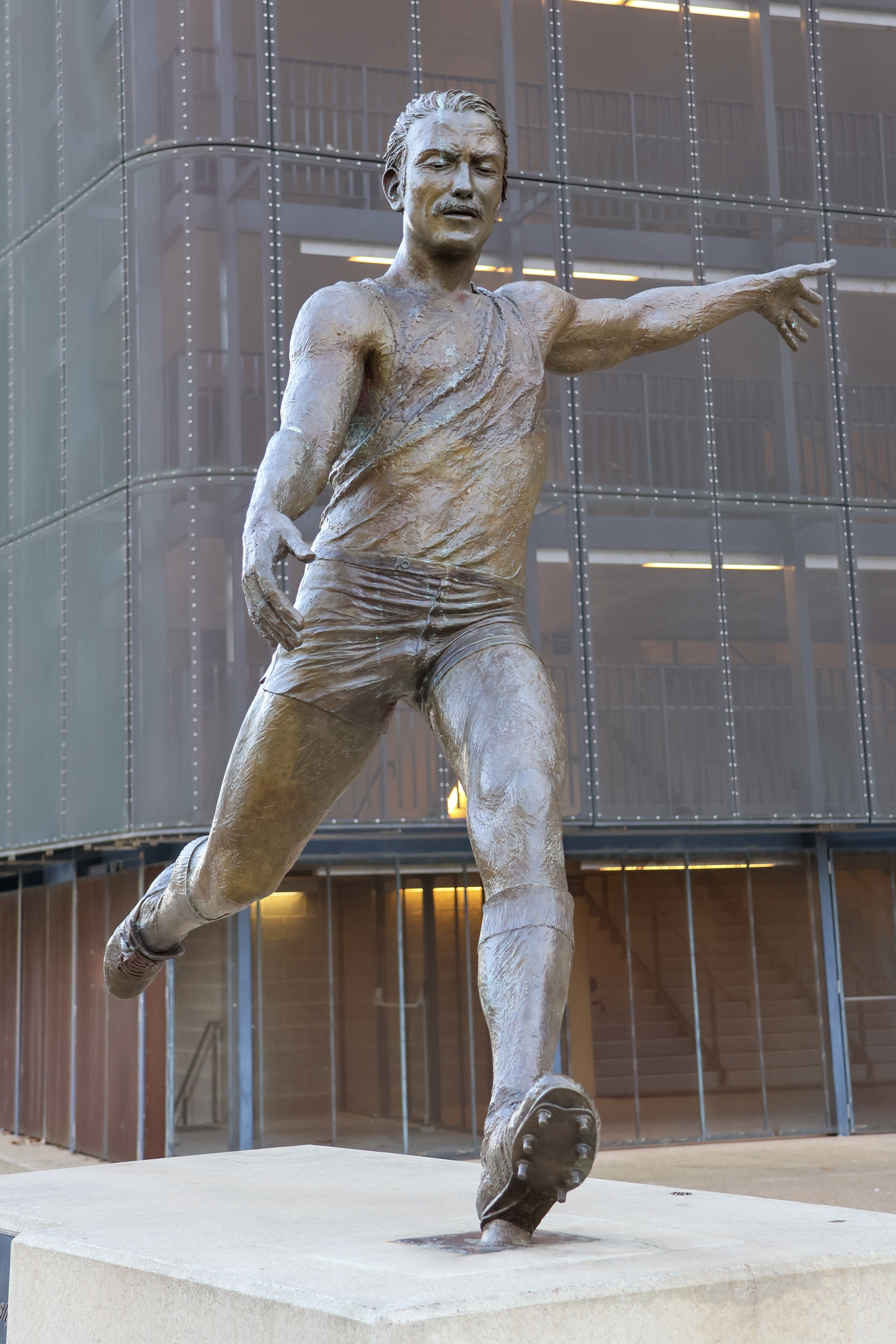
- Malcolm Blight, the namesake of the award, coached Adelaide's first two premierships.
- Sport: Australian rules football
- Awarded for: The best and fairest player at the Adelaide Football Club
- Location: Adelaide Convention Centre
- Country: Australia
- Presented by: Adelaide Football Club

History
- First award: 1991
- First winner: Mark Mickan
- Most wins: Jordan Dawson (4 times)
- Most recent: Jordan Dawson (4th award)

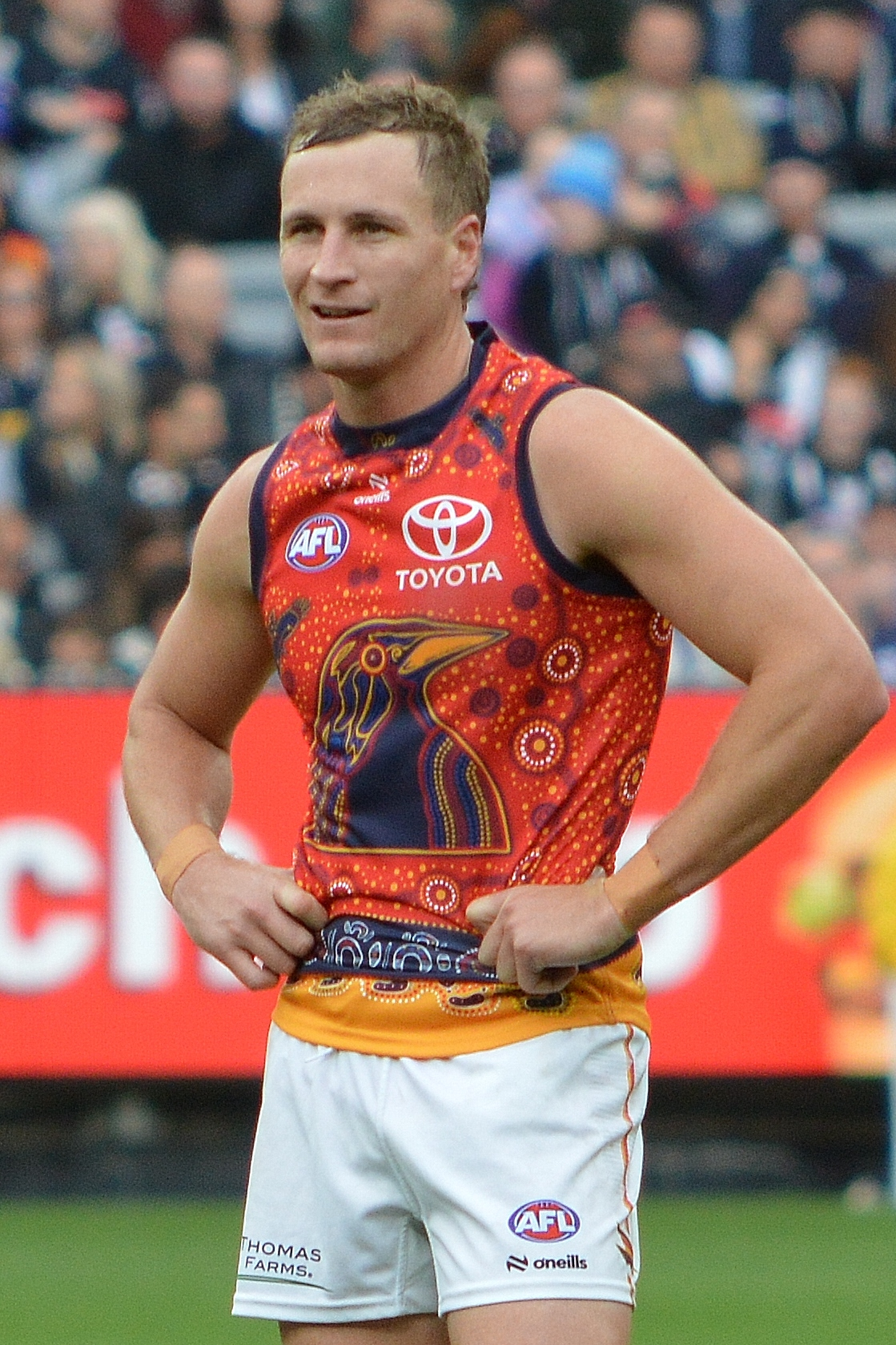
Jordan Dawson holds the record for the most Malcolm Blight Medals with four

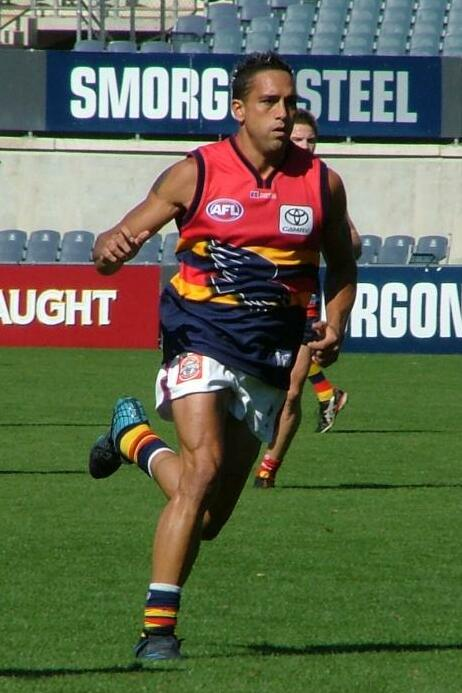
Andrew McLeod won his first of three Malcolm Blight Medals in a premiership year

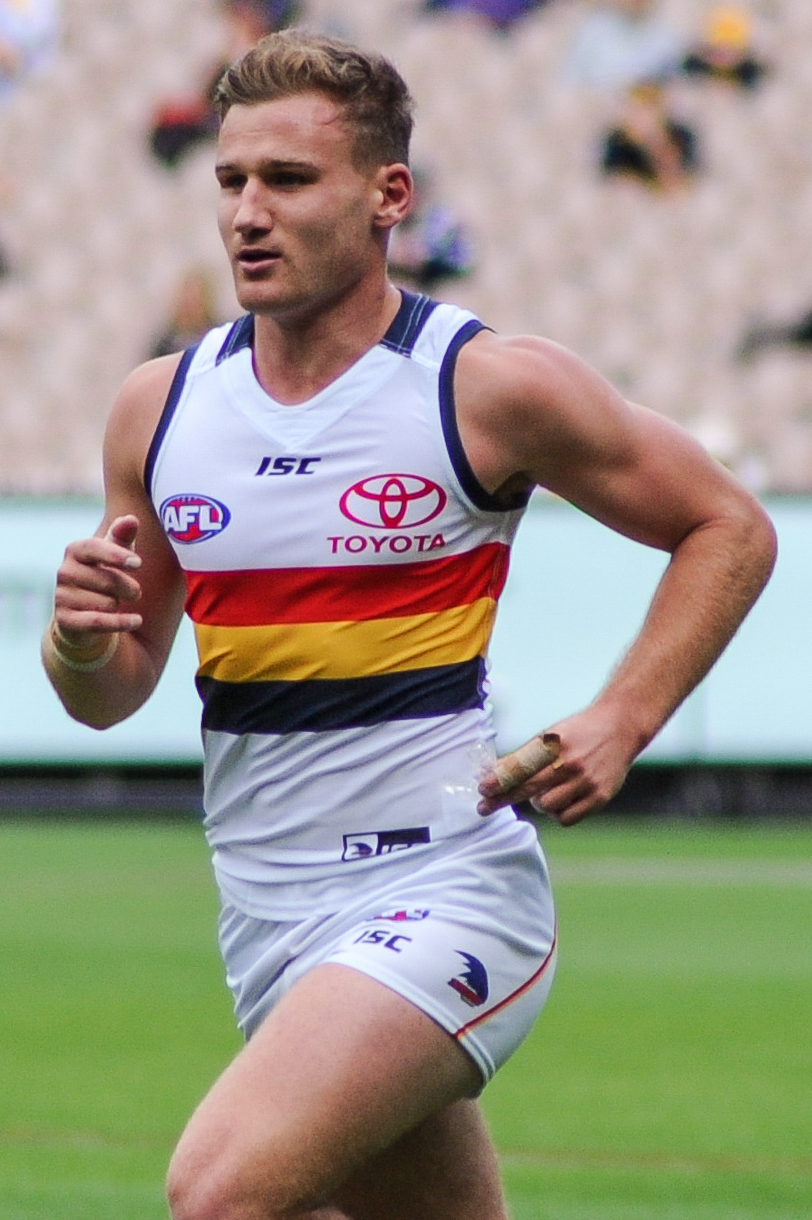
Rory Laird has won the award three times

The Malcolm Blight Medal is a post-season award given to the best and fairest player for the Adelaide Football Club. The medal was first awarded in 1991, and later named after former Adelaide Crows coach Malcolm Blight. The voting system as of the 2017 AFL season, consists of five coaches giving each player a ranking from zero to four after each match. Players can receive a maximum of 20 votes for a game.

The current holder of the award is Jordan Dawson, who in 2026 became the first player to win the award on four occasions.

== Recipients ==
^	Denotes current player
+	Player won Brownlow Medal in same season
#	Played in that season's premiership team

Season	Recipient(s)	Runner up	Third	Ref.
1991	Mark Mickan	Tony McGuinness	Nigel Smart	
1992	Chris McDermott	Tony McGuinness	Mark Bickley	
1993	Tony McGuinness	Mark Bickley	Tony Modra	
1994	Shaun Rehn	Tony McGuinness	Mark Ricciuto	
1995	Matthew Connell	Andrew Jarman	Simon Tregenza	
1996	Matthew Liptak	Nigel Smart	Darren Jarman	
1997#	Andrew McLeod	Darren Jarman	Mark Ricciuto	
1998#	Mark Ricciuto	Nigel Smart	Andrew McLeod	
1999	Ben Hart	Andrew McLeod	Nigel Smart	
2000	Simon Goodwin	Andrew McLeod	Mark Ricciuto	
2001	Andrew McLeod (2)	Mark Stevens	Ben Hart	
2002	Ben Hart (2)	Tyson Edwards	Tyson Stenglein	
2002	Ben Hart (2)	Tyson Edwards	Mark Stevens	
2003	Mark Ricciuto+ (2)	Tyson Edwards	Andrew McLeod	
2004	Mark Ricciuto (3)	Tyson Stenglein	Tyson Edwards	
2005	Simon Goodwin (2)	Nathan Bassett	Ben Rutten	
2006	Simon Goodwin (3)	Tyson Edwards	Graham Johncock	
2007	Andrew McLeod (3)	Simon Goodwin	Scott Thompson	
2008	Nathan Bock	Simon Goodwin	Scott Thompson	
2009	Bernie Vince	Jason Porplyzia	Simon Goodwin	
2010	Richard Douglas	Scott Thompson	Michael Doughty	
2011	Scott Thompson	Nathan van Berlo	Ben Rutten	
2011	Scott Thompson	Nathan van Berlo	Graham Johncock	
2012	Scott Thompson (2)	Patrick Dangerfield	Rory Sloane	
2013	Rory Sloane	Richard Douglas	Patrick Dangerfield	
2013	Rory Sloane	Richard Douglas	Daniel Talia	
2014	Daniel Talia	Rory Sloane	Patrick Dangerfield	
2015	Patrick Dangerfield	Rory Laird^	Eddie Betts	
2016	Rory Sloane (2)	Eddie Betts	Tom Lynch	
2017	Matt Crouch	Rory Sloane	Rory Laird^	
2018	Rory Laird^	Matt Crouch	Josh Jenkins	
2019	Brad Crouch	Rory Sloane	Rory Laird^	
2020	Reilly O'Brien^	Rory Laird^	Luke Brown	
2021	Rory Laird^ (2)	Ben Keays^	Paul Seedsman	
2022	Rory Laird^ (3)	Jordan Dawson^	Ben Keays^	
2023	Jordan Dawson^	Rory Laird^	Taylor Walker	
2024	Jordan Dawson^ (2)	Jake Soligo^	Max Michalanney^	
2024	Ben Keays^	Jake Soligo^	Max Michalanney^	
2025	Jordan Dawson^ (3)	Riley Thilthorpe^	Josh Worrell^	
2026	Jordan Dawson^ (4)	Lachlan McAndrew^	Alex Neal-Bullen^	

== Multiple winners ==
^	Denotes current player

Player	Medals	Seasons
Jordan Dawson^	4	2023, 2024, 2025, 2026
Simon Goodwin	3	2000, 2005, 2006
Rory Laird^	3	2018, 2021, 2022
Andrew McLeod	3	1997, 2001, 2007
Mark Ricciuto	3	1998, 2003, 2004
Ben Hart	2	1999, 2002
Rory Sloane	2	2013, 2016
Scott Thompson	2	2011, 2012

== Other awards ==
Below is a list of other awards given at the Malcolm Blight Medal ceremony and the recipients of these awards.

The Players' Trademark Award, formerly known as the Coach's Award and the Chelsea Phillis Coaches’ Award, now recognises the player who has best upheld the core values of the team on and off the field.

Year	Recipient
1995	Andrew Jarman
1996	Mark Bickley
1997	Mark Bickley (2)
1998	Simon Goodwin
1999	Ben Hart
2000	Mark Ricciuto
2001	Mark Bickley (3)
2002	Tyson Stenglein
2003	Robert Shirley
2004	Mark Ricciuto (2)
2005	Robert Shirley (2)
2006	Matthew Bode
2007	Robert Shirley (3)
2008	Richard Douglas
2009	Jason Porplyzia
2010	Richard Douglas (2)
2011	Scott Thompson
2012	Rory Sloane
2013	Andy Otten
2014	Eddie Betts
2015	Rory Sloane (2)
2016	Rory Sloane (3)
2017	Brad Crouch
2018	Tom Doedee
2019	Rory Sloane (4)
2020	Ben Keays^
2021	Rory Laird^
2022	Rory Laird^ (2)
2023	Jordan Dawson^
2024	Jordan Dawson^ (2)
2025	Jordan Dawson^ (3)
2026	Jordan Dawson^ (4)

The Members' MVP Award, formerly known as the 19th Man Award, is voted by members of the football club.

Year	Recipient
1998	Nigel Smart
1999	Ben Hart
2000	Mark Ricciuto
2001	Andrew McLeod
2002	Tyson Edwards
2003	Mark Ricciuto (2)
2004	Tyson Edwards (2)
2005	Simon Goodwin
2006	Tyson Edwards (3)
2007	Andrew McLeod (2)
2008	Nathan Bock
2009	Bernie Vince
2010	Graham Johncock
2011	Scott Thompson
2012	Patrick Dangerfield
2013	Rory Sloane
2014	Rory Sloane (2)
2015	Rory Laird^
2016	Rory Sloane (3)
2017	Matt Crouch
2018	Rory Laird^ (2)
2019	Daniel Talia
2020	Reilly O'Brien^
2021	Rory Laird^ (3)
2022	Jordan Dawson^
2023	Taylor Walker
2024	Ben Keays^
2025	Jordan Dawson^ (2)
2026	Jordan Dawson^ (3)

The Phil Walsh Best Team Man Award was renamed in 2015 to honour the late Phil Walsh. It recognises the most selfless player who lives and breathes ‘team first’.

Year	Recipient
1991	Rodney Maynard
1992	Mark Bickley
1993	Mark Bickley (2)
1994	Mark Ricciuto
1995	Rod Jameson
1996	Matthew Robran
1997	Kym Koster
1998	Peter Caven
1999	Mark Stevens
2000	Mark Bickley (3)
2001	Tyson Stenglein
2002	Mark Stevens (2)
2003	Mark Ricciuto (2)
2004	Matthew Clarke
2005	Nathan Bassett
2006	Simon Goodwin
2007	Scott Stevens
2008	Michael Doughty
2009	Brad Symes
2010	Scott Stevens (2)
2011	Michael Doughty (2)
2012	Sam Jacobs
2013	Richard Douglas
2014	Taylor Walker
2015	James Podsiadly
2016	Eddie Betts
2017	Richard Douglas (2)
2018	Richard Douglas (3)
2019	Kyle Hartigan
2020	Tom Lynch
2021	Tom Lynch (2)
2022	Reilly O'Brien^
2023	Reilly O'Brien^ (2)
2024	Reilly O'Brien^ (3)
2025	Alex Neal-Bullen^
2026	Alex Neal-Bullen^ (2)

The Dr. Brian Sando, OAM Trophy is awarded to the player who shows professionalism and preparation to play at the highest level.

Year	Recipient
2012	Daniel Talia
2013	Daniel Talia (2)
2014	Nathan van Berlo
2015	Jake Lever
2016	David Mackay
2017	Rory Sloane
2018	Tom Doedee
2019	Reilly O'Brien^
2020	Andrew McPherson
2021	Ned McHenry
2022	Ben Keays^
2023	Andrew McPherson (2)
2024	Ben Keays^ (2)
2025	Ben Keays^ (3)
2026	Jordan Dawson^

The current Mark Bickley Emerging Talent Award is an amalgamation of two awards from the Club’s history – the Emerging Talent Award and the M.A. Bickley Award. The Mark Bickley Emerging Talent Award now recognises the achievements of a player under the age of 21 as the best ‘all round’ emerging talent.

Year	Recipient	
Year	Emerging Talent Award	Mark Bickley Award
1995	Andrew McLeod	—N/a
1996	Peter Vardy	—N/a
1997	Kane Johnson	—N/a
1998	Andrew Eccles	—N/a
1999	Brett Burton	—N/a
2000	Tyson Stenglein	—N/a
2001	Chris Ladhams	—N/a
2002	Graham Johncock	—N/a
2003	Brent Reilly	—N/a
2004	Ben Rutten	—N/a
2005	Nathan van Berlo	Chris Knights
2006	Jason Porplyzia	Nathan van Berlo
2007	Jonathon Griffin	Jason Porplyzia
2008	Kurt Tippett	David Mackay
2009	Andy Otten	Patrick Dangerfield
2010	Rory Sloane	Phil Davis
2011	Daniel Talia	Matthew Jaensch
2012	Brodie Smith	Sam Kerridge
2013	Brad Crouch	Luke Brown
2014	Charlie Cameron	
2015	Matt Crouch	
2016	Jake Lever	
2017	Wayne Milera^	
2018	Tom Doedee	
2019	Chayce Jones	
2020	Andrew McPherson	
2021	Harry Schoenberg	
2022	Sam Berry^	
2023	Max Michalanney^	
2024	Jake Soligo^	
2025	Daniel Curtin^	
2026	Archie Ludowyke^	

The Foundation Community Leadership Award recognises a player who made a significant contribution to the community outside of football.

Year	Recipient
2015	Taylor Walker
2016	Charlie Cameron
2016	Kyle Hartigan
2017	Eddie Betts
2018	Hugh Greenwood
2019	Tom Doedee
2020	—N/a
2021	—N/a
2022	Tom Doedee (2)
2023	Reilly O'Brien^
2024	Reilly O'Brien^ (2)
2025	Nick Murray^
2026	Charlie Edwards^

== See also ==
- Adelaide Club Champion (AFL Women's) (list of Adelaide Football Club best and fairest winners in the AFL Women's)
