= Showdown Medal =

Annual Australian rules football award

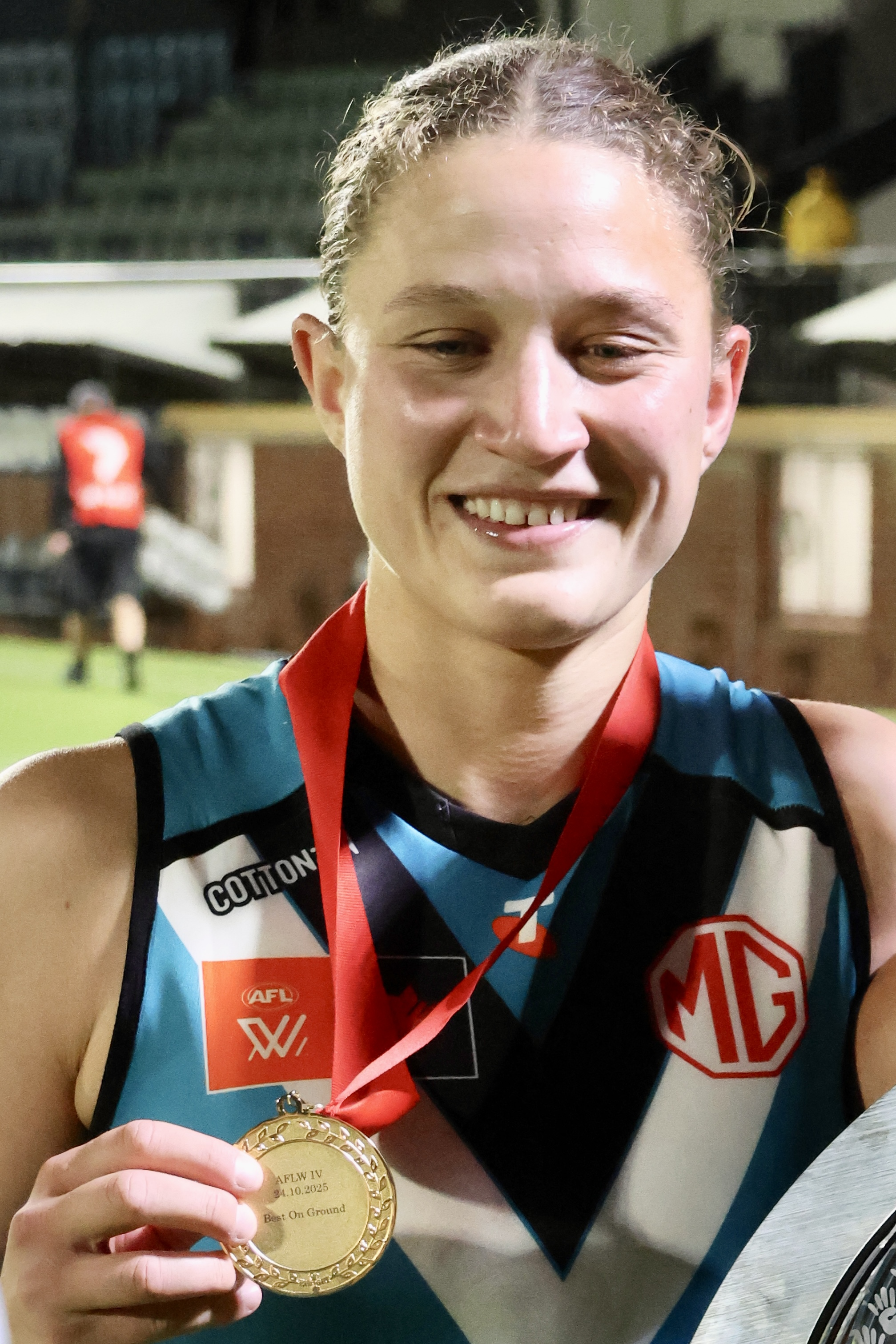
Abbey Dowrick wearing her Showdown Medal in 2025

The Showdown Medal is the medal awarded to the player adjudged best on ground in the Showdown AFL match between Adelaide and Port Adelaide. It is thus similar to the Glendinning–Allan Medal awarded in Western Derby games. However, no medal is awarded if the teams meet in a final, as they did in 2005.

The Showdown Medal was first presented in Showdown VII, Round 7, 2000, although in 2025 retrospective Showdown Medals were awarded by the clubs to players adjudged best on ground in the six Showdowns before the first medal was awarded. It also was formerly known as the "West End Medal", but is currently sponsored by Balfours.

For Showdown 39 in Round 16, 2015, the Showdown Medal was named the Phillip Walsh Medal, after the late Adelaide coach Phil Walsh.

== AFL ==
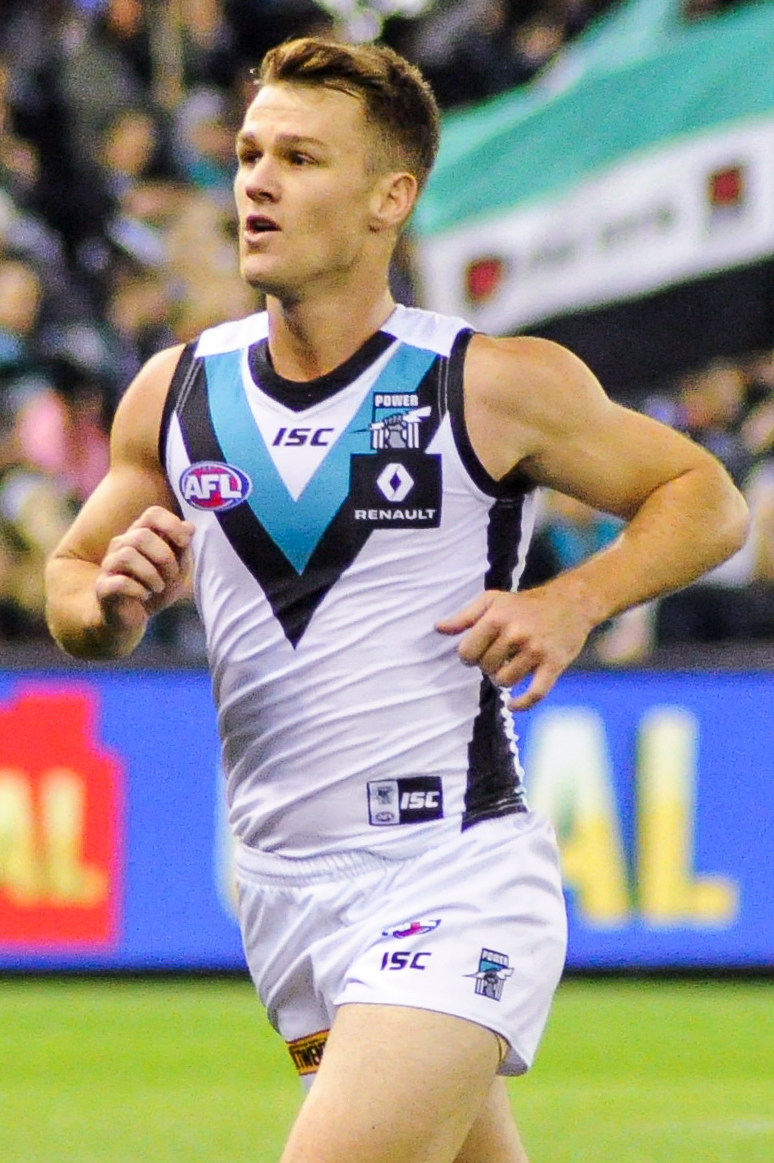
Robbie Gray holds the record for the most Showdown Medals, with five.

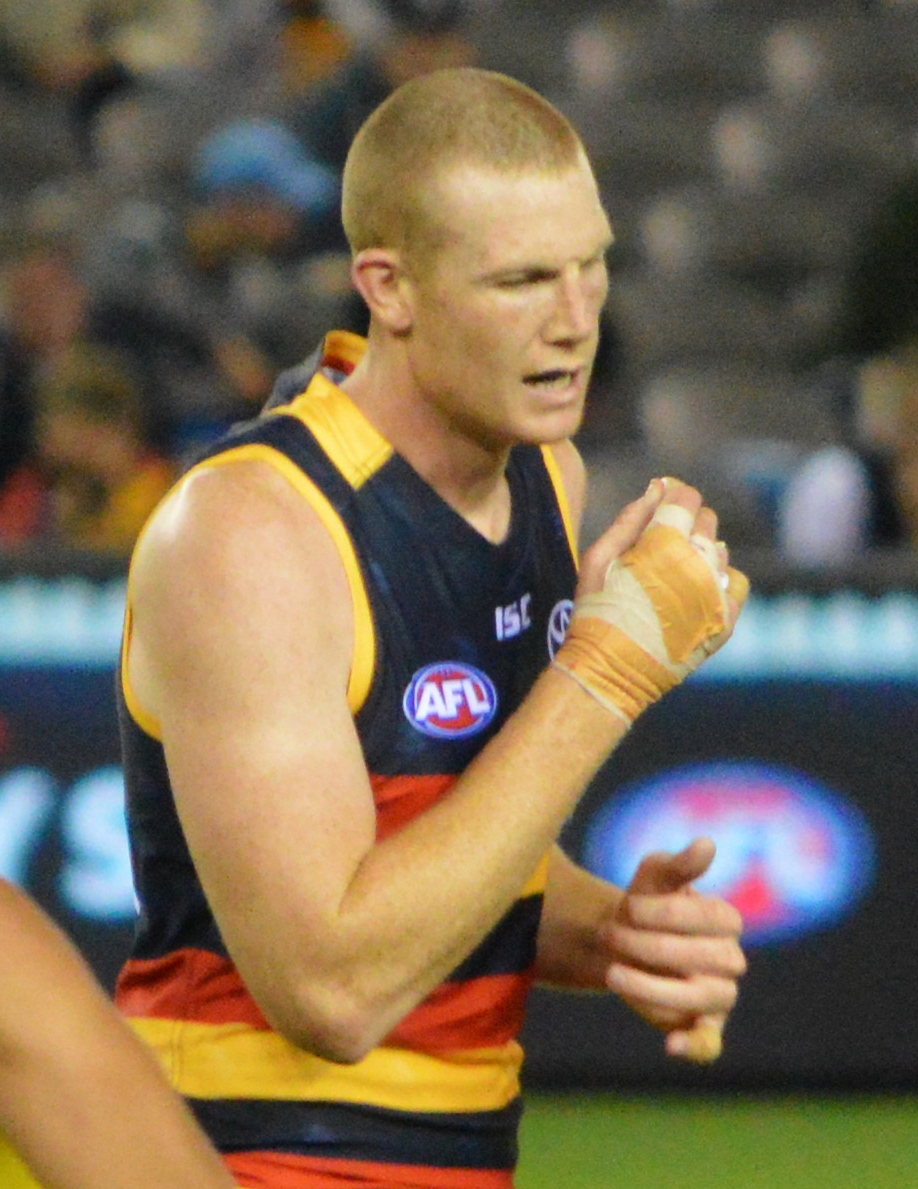
Sam Jacobs is one of two Crows to win the Medal on three occasions.

Year	Round	Winner	Ref
1997	4	Darren Mead	
1997	19	Brett James	
1998	4	Adam Kingsley	
1998	19	Mark Ricciuto	
1999	6	Mark Bickley	
1999	21	Josh Francou	
2000	7	Mark Ricciuto ^{(2)}	
2000	22	Nick Stevens	
2001	3	Josh Francou ^{(2)}	
2001	18	Josh Francou ^{(3)}	
2002	5	Jarrad Schofield	
2002	20	Josh Francou ^{(4)}	
2003	5	Graham Johncock	
2003	22	Peter Burgoyne	
2004	7	Mark Ricciuto ^{(3)}	
2004	22	Warren Tredrea	
2005	3	Mark Ricciuto ^{(4)}	
2005	20	Simon Goodwin	
2005	20	Shaun Burgoyne	
2006	6	Tyson Edwards	
2006	21	Chad Cornes	
2007	3	Andrew McLeod	
2007	18	Simon Goodwin ^{(2)}	
2008	3	Bernie Vince	
2008	16	Danyle Pearce	
2009	6	Dean Brogan	
2009	17	Nathan Bock	
2010	6	Robbie Gray	
2010	17	Domenic Cassisi	
2011	4	Justin Westhoff	
2011	19	Nathan van Berlo	
2012	5	Patrick Dangerfield	
2012	15	Sam Jacobs	
2013	3	Travis Boak	
2013	19	Chad Wingard	
2014	2	Hamish Hartlett	
2014	15	Sam Jacobs ^{(2)}	
2015	5	Robbie Gray ^{(2)}	
2015	16	Scott Thompson	
2016	2	Tom Lynch	
2016	22	Matt Crouch	
2017	3	Rory Sloane	
2017	20	Sam Jacobs ^{(3)}	
2018	8	Robbie Gray ^{(3)}	
2018	20	Robbie Gray ^{(4)}	
2019	8	Alex Keath	
2019	16	Robbie Gray ^{(5)}	
2020	2	Travis Boak ^{(2)}	
2021	8	Travis Boak ^{(3)}	
2021	21	Aliir Aliir	
2022	3	Jordan Dawson	
2022	23	Connor Rozee	
2023	3	Jordan Dawson ^{(2)}	
2023	20	Taylor Walker	
2024	8	Jake Soligo	
2024	23	Zak Butters	
2025	9	Connor Rozee ^{(2)}	
2025	20	Riley Thilthorpe	
2026	8	Sam Berry	
2026	16	Zak Butters ^{(2)}	

Italics denotes winner was on the losing team.

=== Retrospective best on ground ===
As the Showdown Medal was only introduced in 2000, six Showdowns were played without a medal being awarded. In 2019, Michelangelo Rucci, football writer for The Adelaide Advertiser, advocated for a combination of Brownlow Medal, Club Champion voting, and Media votes to determine the selection for retroactively awarded Showdown Medals. This potential for retrospective Showdown Medals being awarded was enhanced by the Western Derby allocating retrospective medals in 2018. Another Showdown where a medal was not awarded to the player adjudged best afield was the 2005 Semi-Final. The official Adelaide website, afc.com.au, lists Simon Goodwin as their best player in the 2005 Showdown Final with 3 goals and 22 disposals at 91% disposal efficiency to his name.

Michelangelo Rucci's 'Best on Ground' before Showdown Medal
Match	Year	Combined	Winning club	Brownlow	Club B&F	Merv Agars Medal
1	1997	Darren Mead	Port Adelaide	3: Darren Mead; 2: Shayne Breuer; 1: Brendon Lade	3: Darren Mead; 2: Stephen Paxman; 1: Stephen Daniels	3: Shane Bond; 2: Brayden Lyle; 1: Darren Mead
2	1997	Brett James	Adelaide	3: Gavin Wanganeen; 2: Brendon Lade; 1: Matthew Connell	3: Brett James; 2: Darren Jarman; 1: Kym Koster	3: Brett James; 2: Stephen Daniels; 1: Darren Jarman
3	1998	Adam Kingsley	Port Adelaide	3: Nathan Bassett; 2: Josh Francou; 1: Matthew Primus	3: Adam Kingsley; 2: Matthew Primus; 1: Fabian Francis	3: Adam Kingsley; 2: Matthew Primus; 1: Fabian Francis
4	1998	Mark Ricciuto	Adelaide	3: Mark Ricciuto; 2: Peter Vardy; 1: Darren Jarman	3: Mark Ricciuto; 2: Peter Vardy; 1: Ben Hart	3: Mark Ricciuto; 2: Peter Vardy; 1: Ben Hart
5	1999	Mark Bickley	Adelaide	3: Kane Johnson; 2: Mark Bickley; 1: David Gallagher	3: Matthew Robran; 2: Mark Bickley; 1: Ben Hart	3: Mark Bickley; 2: Matthew Robran; 1: Ben Hart
6	1999	Josh Francou	Port Adelaide	3: Brendon Lade; 2: Josh Francou; 1: Gavin Wanganeen	3: Josh Francou; 3: Brendon Lade; 3: Gavin Wanganeen	3: Josh Francou; 2: Gavin Wanganeen; 1: Brendon Lade

2005 Showdown Final
Match		Combined	Winning club	Brownlow	Club B&F	Merv Agars Medal
2005	19	Simon Goodwin	Adelaide	N/A	3: Simon Goodwin; 2: Mark Ricciuto; 1: Scott Welsh	N/A

== AFL Women's ==
Season	Round	Winner	Ref
2022 (S7)	6	Chelsea Randall	
2023	1	Niamh Kelly	
2024	1	Ebony Marinoff	
2025	11	Abbey Dowrick	
2026	8	Abbey Dowrick ^{(2)}	

== See also ==
- Showdown (AFL)
- Marcus Ashcroft Medal
- Glendinning–Allan Medal
- Kirk–Ward Medal
