= Simon Goodwin =

Australian rules footballer, born 1976

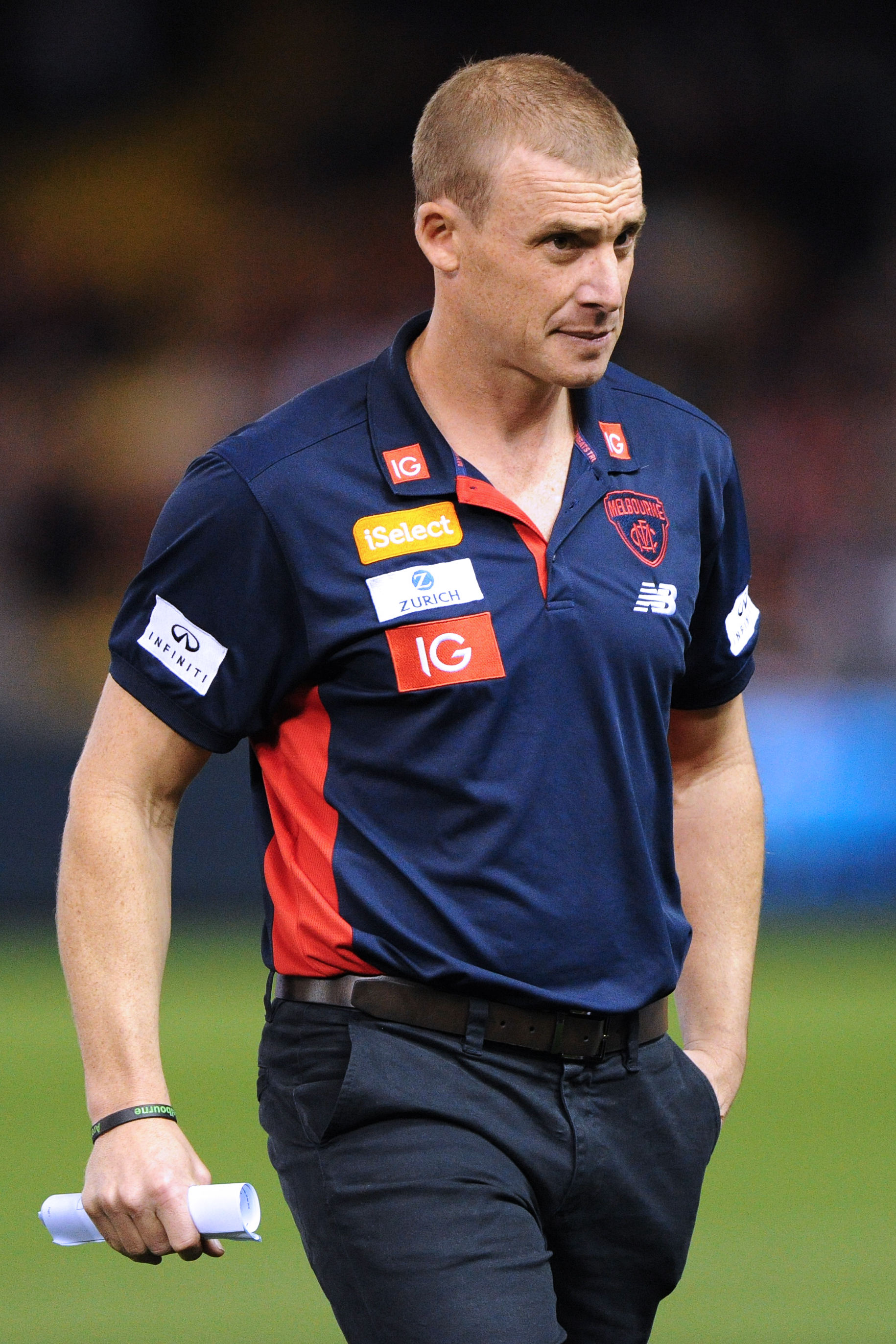
- Goodwin as Melbourne coach in April 2018

Personal information
- Full name: Simon Goodwin
- Nicknames: Goody, Badloss
- Born: 26 December 1976 (age 49); Adelaide, South Australia
- Original team: South Adelaide (SANFL)
- Draft: No. 18, 1996 pre-season draft
- Height: 185 cm (6 ft 1 in)
- Weight: 86 kg (190 lb)
- Position: Midfielder

Playing career^{1}
Years	Club	Games (Goals)
1997–2010	Adelaide	275 (162)

Coaching career^{3}
Years	Club	Games (W–L–D)
2013	Essendon	1 (0–1–0)
2017–2025	Melbourne	202 (111–90–1)
Total		203 (111–91–1)
- ^{1} Playing statistics correct to the end of 2010.^{3} Coaching statistics correct as of 2025.

Career highlights
- Playing: Australian Football Hall of Fame inductee 2017; 2× AFL premiership player (1997, 1998); 5× All-Australian team (2000, 2001, 2005, 2006, 2009); Adelaide captain (2008–2010); Malcolm Blight Medal (2000, 2005, 2006); Michael Tuck Medal (2006); AFLCA Champion Player of the Year (2006); Australia international rules football team (2000, 2001); Dream Team (Australian rules football) (2008); Adelaide Team of the Decade – Interchange; Showdown Medal (2005, 2007); Coaching: AFL premiership coach (2021); AFLCA Coach of the year (2021); All-Australian (2021)

Simon Goodwin (born 26 December 1976) is a retired Australian rules football player and coach, who played 275 games for the Adelaide Football Club in the Australian Football League (AFL). He went on to become the interim senior coach of the Essendon Football Club in 2013 and the senior coach of the Melbourne Football Club between 2017 and 2025, helping lead the club to its first premiership in 57 years in 2021.

Throughout his playing career, Goodwin was a high-achieving midfielder who earnt multiple All-Australian selections and best and fairests. He captained the club for three seasons before retiring at the end of the 2010 season. He won two premierships with the Crows in 1997 and 1998. As coach of Melbourne, Goodwin led the Demons back into the finals in 2018, before coaching the side to premiership success three years later. His tenure as coach ended in August 2025, three weeks out from the end of the season, following successive years in which the club failed to initially win and later qualify for finals.

Goodwin was inducted into the Australian Football Hall of Fame as a player in 2017.

== Playing career ==
=== Adelaide Crows ===
==== Early career (1996–1999) ====
Prior to embarking on his AFL career, Goodwin was an accomplished junior cricketer, co-captaining the South Australian Under-19 cricket team. Recruited from South Adelaide in the SANFL with pick No. 18 in the 1996 Pre-season Draft, Goodwin made his debut for Adelaide Crows in Round 1, 1997, but his game was marred by a severe quadriceps injury which kept him out for months.

Goodwin returned to the side in Round 14 to face West Coast, holding his position until he was omitted following the Round 18 victory over Carlton at Football Park. Goodwin earned a recall prior to the beginning of the 1997 finals series, returning solid performances in all four of Adelaide's wins, including 19 possessions and a goal in the victorious 1997 Grand Final.

After a poor start to 1998, Goodwin blossomed in the second half of the season, showing glimpses of the prolific ball-winner he would become in later years and once again playing a solid role in all four finals on the way to Adelaide's second premiership win in the 1998 Grand Final.

The 1999 season was to be one of disappointment, however, as Goodwin's performances mirrored that of his club. Despite featuring in 19 of Adelaide's 22 games, Goodwin's progress was marred by inconsistency as Adelaide finished a lowly 13th in what was, at the time, the club's worst-ever finish to a season.

==== Rising career (2000–2004) ====
Following the disappointing 1999 season, Goodwin emerged as a star in the 2000 season with a string of midfield displays earning both his first All-Australian guernsey and Gold Jacket as Adelaide Club Champion. Goodwin capped this watershed year with selection to the Adelaide Football Club Team of the Decade.

Another All-Australian selection followed in 2001 with consistently good performances alongside fellow star midfielders Mark Ricciuto, Andrew McLeod and Tyson Edwards pushing Adelaide back into premiership reckoning for 2002 after three seasons where the club had finished no higher than eighth.

In 2002 Goodwin struggled for consistency, in part due to the extra attention he was receiving from opposition taggers. Highly prolific games such as his 39 possession/1 goal game against Collingwood in Round 14 were contrasted by his 17 possession game against Fremantle in Round 7. After suffering an injury in Round 19 against Essendon, Goodwin returned to the team in time for the finals, where despite high expectations the Crows were defeated in a preliminary final.

A member of Adelaide's pre-season premiership-winning team, Goodwin's highly promising 2003 was marred by a broken arm suffered early in the Round 11 clash with Hawthorn at the MCG when he collided with the boundary fence following a contest. Upon his return to the side in Round 17 Goodwin looked to be far from his best, able only to provide a series of steady displays as the Crows, despite being one of the hot premiership favourites, were knocked out in a semi-final.

As with 1999, Goodwin endured another horror year to mirror that of Adelaide's in 2004. Sidelined with an adductor injury between Rounds 4 and 16, by the time Goodwin returned Gary Ayres had resigned and been replaced by Neil Craig as the Crows languished near the lower end of the ladder. To further rub salt into the wound Goodwin was cited for tripping Roger James and suspended for one week in Adelaide's 25-point loss to eventual premiers Port Adelaide in Round 22.

==== Career high (2005–2007) ====
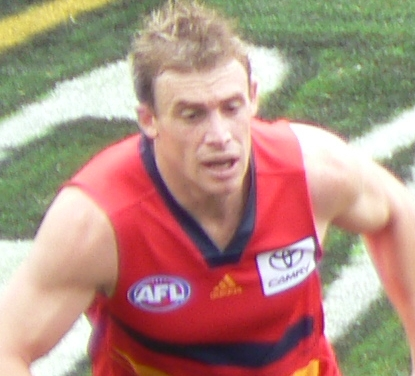
Goodwin playing with Adelaide in 2006

Goodwin and Adelaide's fortunes turned around in 2005 as the side won the minor premiership. Individually Goodwin capped a superb return to top form, winning his third All-Australian guernsey and capturing his second club champion award. His stellar form continued in 2006, first winning the Michael Tuck Medal for best afield in Adelaide's pre-season grand final loss to Geelong (the only player to do so in a loss), before again performing brilliantly in the season proper, winning his fourth All-Australian selection and third Gold Jacket.

On 1 March 2007, Goodwin was fined a record $40,000 and ordered to undertake compulsory counselling for placing four bets involving AFL matches totalling $16,024.58. Goodwin, along with three other players, became the first players in AFL history to be caught for betting on AFL matches.

==== Captaincy (2008–2010) ====
In early December 2007, Goodwin was named the captain for Adelaide for the 2008 football season. This coincided with a move into the forward line to allow the club's young midfielders to gain experience and bolster a struggling attack. The move paid dividends with Goodwin enjoying a career-best seven-goal haul in Adelaide's crushing Round 2 victory over the West Coast Eagles. In later matches, Goodwin was rotated between the forward and back half, increasingly the latter in order to allow young forwards to stake their claims for a permanent spot.

In Round 15, 2009, Goodwin played his 250th game. The Adelaide Crows celebrated by defeating Fremantle by 117 points, 19.16 (130) to 1.7 (13), shattering a number of records in doing so.

==== Retirement ====
On 25 May 2010, Goodwin announced he would retire at the conclusion of the 2010 AFL season.

== International rules ==
Goodwin served as the Australia international rules football team's goalkeeper for the 2004 International Rules Series.

== Coaching career ==
=== Essendon Football Club ===
On 30 September 2010, Goodwin announced his appointment as assistant coach at Essendon Football Club. He briefly took over as Essendon's caretaker senior coach for the final round of the 2013 season, following the 12-month suspension handed to James Hird as a result of the Essendon supplements saga. In his only game at the helm, Essendon lost to Richmond by 39 points.

On 10 October 2013, Goodwin was promoted to the role of senior assistant coach for the 2014 season, following Mark Thompson's appointment as interim senior coach for the period of Hird's suspension.

=== Melbourne Football Club ===
On 18 September 2014, Goodwin signed a five-year contract with the Melbourne Football Club. He served for two years as an assistant coach under senior coach Paul Roos before taking over as senior coach for three years from 2017 in a succession plan. After a ninth-place finish in 2017, Goodwin led the club to its first finals series in twelve years in 2018. Melbourne reached the preliminary final, where they lost to eventual premiers West Coast by sixty-six points at Optus Stadium.

After falling to second-last in 2019 and narrowly missing out on the finals in the shortened 2020 season, Melbourne under Goodwin surged forward in 2021, winning their first nine games, their best unbeaten start to a season since 1956, and never finished a round lower than fourth on the ladder. Melbourne won their first minor premiership since 1964 — then their most recent premiership season — and advanced to their first Grand Final since 2000, prior to which Goodwin was named AFLCA Coach of the Year. In the 2021 AFL Grand Final against the Western Bulldogs, Goodwin's Demons started well, but faltered in the second and early in the third quarter and trailed by as much as nineteen points. Melbourne then put together a massive turnaround, scoring the next twelve goals en route to a 74-point victory, claiming their thirteenth flag and ending their 57-year premiership drought.

Melbourne's premiership success prompted several in the football media industry to canvass the possibility of a "dynasty side" capable of winning multiple premierships. Under Goodwin the side registered top-four finishes in both 2022 and 2023 and qualified for finals, though on both occasions were defeated in straight sets, becoming the first club to suffer the fate since the top-eight finals system was adopted in 2000. During this time there were several media reports of poor culture and illicit drug misuse within the club published, though Goodwin flatly denied allegations he had engaged in such conduct.

Following poor on-field results in the 2024 season in which the club failed to qualify for finals, and in the 2025 season, following a continuation of consistent poor on-field results where the club sat in twelve position on the ladder with seven wins and thirteen losses, the board sacked Goodwin as senior coach of Melbourne Football Club on August 4, 2025, after Round 21, 2025 in the middle of the 2025 AFL season, despite him having one year left to run on his contract. Goodwin was then replaced by assistant coach Troy Chaplin as caretaker senior coach of Melbourne Football Club for the remainder of the 2025 AFL season.

=== Sydney Swans ===
On September 19, 2025, Goodwin was announced as the Sydney Swans' Director of Coaching and Performance for the 2026 AFL season under senior coach Dean Cox.

== Statistics ==
=== Playing statistics ===
Legend
G	Goals	K	Kicks	D	Disposals	T	Tackles
B	Behinds	H	Handballs	M	Marks

Season	Team	No.	Games	Totals							Averages (per game)							Votes
Season	Team	No.	Games	G	B	K	H	D	M	T	G	B	K	H	D	M	T	Votes
1997^{#}	Adelaide	36	10	4	1	93	26	119	32	25	0.4	0.1	9.3	2.6	11.9	3.2	2.5	0
1998^{#}	Adelaide	36	21	8	6	202	89	291	60	45	0.4	0.3	9.6	4.2	13.9	2.9	2.1	0
1999	Adelaide	36	19	2	2	148	77	225	49	17	0.1	0.1	7.8	4.1	11.8	2.6	0.9	0
2000	Adelaide	36	22	15	21	284	177	461	104	28	0.7	1.0	12.9	8.0	21.0	4.7	1.3	7
2001	Adelaide	36	23	16	11	370	149	519	73	90	0.7	0.5	16.1	6.5	22.6	3.2	3.9	10
2002	Adelaide	36	22	17	16	271	205	476	61	63	0.8	0.7	12.3	9.3	21.6	2.8	2.9	7
2003	Adelaide	36	19	13	12	208	137	345	62	43	0.7	0.6	10.9	7.2	18.2	3.3	2.3	0
2004	Adelaide	36	10	6	2	123	65	188	38	22	0.6	0.2	12.3	6.5	18.8	3.8	2.2	2
2005	Adelaide	36	24	20	12	313	233	546	107	64	0.8	0.5	13.0	9.7	22.8	4.5	2.7	9
2006	Adelaide	36	24	12	12	369	270	639	101	83	0.5	0.5	15.4	11.3	26.6	4.2	3.5	10
2007	Adelaide	36	21	10	8	268	248	516	91	53	0.5	0.4	12.8	11.8	24.6	4.3	2.5	12
2008	Adelaide	36	23	33	29	272	196	468	120	61	1.4	1.3	11.8	8.5	20.3	5.2	2.7	5
2009	Adelaide	36	21	4	2	220	328	548	119	46	0.2	0.1	10.5	15.6	26.1	5.7	2.2	6
2010	Adelaide	36	16	2	1	185	217	402	81	58	0.1	0.1	11.6	13.6	25.1	5.1	3.6	6
Career			275	162	135	3326	2417	5743	1098	698	0.6	0.5	12.1	8.8	20.9	4.0	2.5	74

=== Coaching statistics ===
Updated to the end of 2024.

Team	Year	Home and Away Season					Finals			
Team	Year	Won	Lost	Drew	Win %	Position	Won	Lost	Win %	Result
ESS	2013	0	1	0	.000	Caretaker	-	-	-	-
ESS Total		0	1	0	.000					
MEL	2017	12	10	0	.545	9th out of 18	-	-	-	-
MEL	2018	14	8	0	.636	5th out of 18	2	1	.667	Lost to West Coast in Preliminary Final
MEL	2019	5	17	0	.227	17th out of 18	-	-	-	-
MEL	2020	9	8	0	.529	9th out of 18	-	-	-	-
MEL	2021	17	4	1	.773	1st out of 18	3	0	1.000	Defeated Western Bulldogs in Grand Final
MEL	2022	16	6	0	.727	2nd out of 18	0	2	.000	Lost to Brisbane in Semi Final
MEL	2023	16	7	0	.697	4th out of 18	0	2	.000	Lost to Carlton in Semi Final
MEL	2024	11	12	0	.478	14th out of 18	-	-	-	-
MEL	2025	7	13	0	.350	resigned after round 21.	-	-	-	-
MEL Total		111	90	1	.550		5	5	.500	Premierships: 2021
Career Total		111	91	1	.545		5	5	.500	Premierships: 2021

*Caretaker coach

== Honours and achievements ==
=== Playing honours ===
Team

- 2× AFL premiership player (Adelaide): 1997, 1998
- McClelland Trophy (Adelaide): 2005
- AFL Pre-Season Cup (Adelaide): 2003

Individual

- AFLCA Champion Player of the Year Award: 2006
- 5× All-Australian team: 2000, 2001, 2005, 2006, 2009
- Adelaide Captain: 2008–2010
- 3× Malcolm Blight Medal: 2000, 2005, 2006
- Dream Team representative honours in AFL Hall of Fame Tribute Match
- 2× Australian international rules football team: 2000, 2001
- State of Origin (South Australia): 1998
- Michael Tuck Medal: 2006
- Showdown Medal: 2005 (Round 20), 2007 (Round 18)
- Australian Football Hall of Fame inductee: 2017
- Adelaide Team of the Decade 1991–2000

=== Coaching honours ===
Team

- AFL Premiership coach (Melbourne): 2021
- McClelland Trophy (Melbourne): 2021

Individual

- Jock McHale Medal: 2021
- All-Australian team: 2021
- AFLCA Allan Jeans Senior Coach of the Year Award: 2021
