= Scott Thompson (footballer, born 1983) =

Australian rules footballer (born 1983)

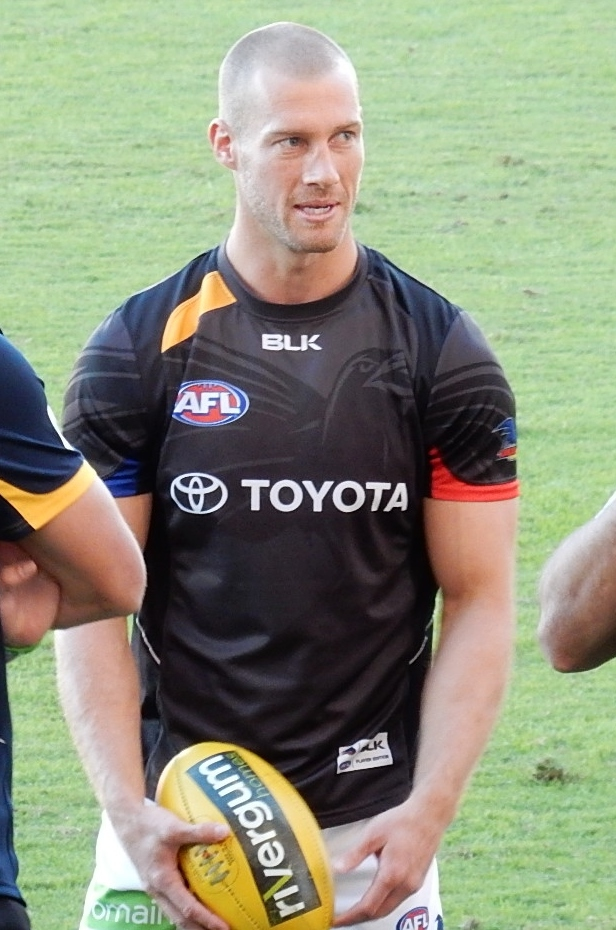

Personal information
- Full name: Scott Thompson
- Nickname: Thommo
- Born: 14 March 1983 (age 43); Adelaide, South Australia
- Original teams: North Haven (SAAFL); Port Adelaide (SANFL)
- Draft: No. 16, 2000 national draft
- Debut: Round 10, 2001, Melbourne vs. St Kilda, at Docklands Stadium
- Height: 185 cm (6 ft 1 in)
- Weight: 86 kg (190 lb)
- Position: Midfielder

Playing career^{1}
Years	Club	Games (Goals)
2001–2004	Melbourne	39 (17)
2005–2017	Adelaide	269 (145)
Total		308 (162)

International team honours^{2}
Years	Team	Games (Goals)
2008	Australia	1 (2)
- ^{1} Playing statistics correct to the end of 2017.^{2} Representative statistics correct as of 2008.

Career highlights
- South Australian Football Hall of Fame; 2× Malcolm Blight Medal (2011, 2012); All-Australian (2012); Phillip Walsh Medal (round 16, 2015); Harold Ball Memorial Trophy (2001); Merv Agars Medal (2012); Adelaide's SANFL Best and Fairest (2017)

Scott Thompson (born 14 March 1983) is a former Australian rules footballer who played for the Melbourne Football Club and Adelaide Football Club in the Australian Football League (AFL). He was drafted by Melbourne with pick 16 in the 2000 national draft from Port Adelaide in the SANFL, and was traded to Adelaide after the 2004 season.

== AFL career ==
=== Melbourne (2001–2004) ===
Thompson debuted with Melbourne in round 10, 2001 as an 18-year-old. After winning the club's Best First Year Player award in 2001, subsequent injuries caused him to struggle to break into the side for the next two years. In 2004 he played every game (barring a one-match suspension for striking) before breaking his foot against Essendon in round 13 and missing the remainder of the year. At the end of the 2004 season, Thompson asked to return to South Australia as his brother was unwell and Adelaide was able to complete a trade, exchanging pick 12 in the national draft.

=== Adelaide (2005–2017) ===
Thompson missed the first game of the 2005 season but played every game from then on for Adelaide, kicking 27 goals for the year. Thompson continued to improve and by 2007 had become arguably one of the elite players in the AFL, averaging almost 25 disposals and 6 marks per game and polling 18 votes in the 2007 Brownlow Medal to finish equal 7th.

Thompson played every game in 2008 and finished third in the Malcolm Blight Medal (Adelaide best and fairest) and for the second year in a row polling the most votes for his club in the Brownlow Medal. Thompson was chosen to play for Australia in the 2008 International Rules Series against Ireland in October 2008 along with teammate Nathan Bock, but was only able to play in the first match due to a leg injury. In the same year, he narrowly avoided a jail term over driving offenses.

After being among Adelaide's best players in a poor 2010 season, Thompson was runner-up to Richard Douglas in the Malcolm Blight Medal for Adelaide's best and fairest player. He went one better the next year, winning the award in a landslide after racking up the second most disposals in the entire competition. His season included a 51 disposal game in round 22 against Gold Coast: the second highest amount of disposals in a match by an VFL/AFL player since the recording of statistics, falling two short of Greg Williams' 53 disposals in 1989. Thompson continued to dominate the following season, winning his second consecutive Malcolm Blight Medal and being named in the All-Australian team. He also finished equal fourth in the Brownlow Medal.

Thompson continued to be an integral part of the Crows' midfield in 2013 and 2014, ranking near the top at the club for disposals (1st and 3rd), clearances (1st and 2nd) and tackles (1st and 3rd). He played his 250th AFL match against Greater Western Sydney in round 5, 2014. In round 20 he was forced out of the side due to injury after having played 99 consecutive games for the club. Thompson missed the opening two rounds in 2015, but rebounded to remain one of Adelaide's best midfielders, averaging 26.7 disposals and finishing seventh in Adelaide's club champion award. He also won the Phillip Walsh Medal in Adelaide's defeat of Port Adelaide in round 16, two weeks after the death of Adelaide coach Phil Walsh.

Thompson played 22 matches in 2016, including 300th AFL match in July 2016, in an Adelaide victory over Collingwood. He continued to perform consistently, averaging 24 disposals per game and leading the club in clearances and centre clearances. He signed a new one-year contract at the end of the season, with the understanding that his role would include some coaching responsibilities as well as playing.

Coach Don Pyke flagged the possibility of a new role for Thompson across half-back during the 2017 season. Thompson was not selected in the senior side until Round 16 against the Western Bulldogs, and he was only able to get 10 possessions for the match. He announced his retirement from AFL a few weeks later, planning to play out the rest of the season in Adelaide's SANFL side. At the end of the season he won Adelaide's State League Club Champion as the best player in Adelaide's reserves team. He won it by a single vote over Tom Doedee.

== Coaching career ==
In November 2017, Thompson was announced as a development coach for the Port Adelaide Football Club. He held this role until April 2020. As of 2022, Thompson is coaching the Unley Mercedes Jets in Division 2 of the Adelaide Footy League. As of 2026 Scott is now a development coach at the AFL team Brisbane Lions.

== Statistics ==
Legend
G	Goals	K	Kicks	D	Disposals	T	Tackles
B	Behinds	H	Handballs	M	Marks

Season	Team	No.	Games	Totals							Averages (per game)						
Season	Team	No.	Games	G	B	K	H	D	M	T	G	B	K	H	D	M	T
2001	Melbourne	6	9	2	1	51	27	78	19	8	0.2	0.1	5.7	3.0	8.7	2.1	0.9
2002	Melbourne	6	5	2	1	33	16	49	15	11	0.4	0.2	6.6	3.2	9.8	3.0	2.2
2003	Melbourne	6	13	5	3	82	84	166	34	32	0.4	0.2	6.3	6.5	12.8	2.6	2.5
2004	Melbourne	6	12	8	4	116	72	188	56	46	0.7	0.3	9.7	6.0	15.7	4.7	3.8
2005	Adelaide	5	24	27	17	267	166	433	107	96	1.1	0.7	11.1	6.9	18.0	4.5	4.0
2006	Adelaide	5	23	22	10	280	191	471	135	86	1.0	0.4	12.2	8.3	20.5	5.9	3.7
2007	Adelaide	5	23	16	16	309	271	580	132	101	0.7	0.7	13.4	11.8	25.2	5.7	4.4
2008	Adelaide	5	23	16	10	302	254	556	114	109	0.7	0.4	13.1	11.0	24.2	5.0	4.7
2009	Adelaide	5	23	11	10	253	352	605	114	99	0.5	0.4	11.0	15.3	26.3	5.0	4.3
2010	Adelaide	5	21	12	9	276	261	537	84	100	0.6	0.4	13.1	12.4	25.6	4.0	4.8
2011	Adelaide	5	22	8	6	343	330	673	94	119	0.4	0.3	15.6	15.0	30.6	4.3	5.4
2012	Adelaide	5	25	10	15	410	327	737	108	119	0.4	0.6	16.4	13.1	29.5	4.3	4.8
2013	Adelaide	5	22	8	9	293	250	543	95	108	0.4	0.4	13.3	11.4	24.7	4.3	4.9
2014	Adelaide	5	19	3	7	257	262	519	69	86	0.2	0.4	13.5	13.8	27.3	3.6	4.5
2015	Adelaide	5	21	8	4	248	313	561	69	127	0.4	0.2	11.8	14.9	26.7	3.3	6.0
2016	Adelaide	5	22	4	3	256	271	527	72	158	0.2	0.1	11.6	12.3	24.0	3.3	7.2
2017	Adelaide	5	1	0	0	5	5	10	1	5	0.0	0.0	5.0	5.0	10.0	1.0	5.0
Career			308	162	125	3781	3452	7233	1318	1410	0.5	0.4	12.3	11.2	23.5	4.3	4.6
