= Richard Douglas (footballer) =

Australian rules footballer (born 1987)

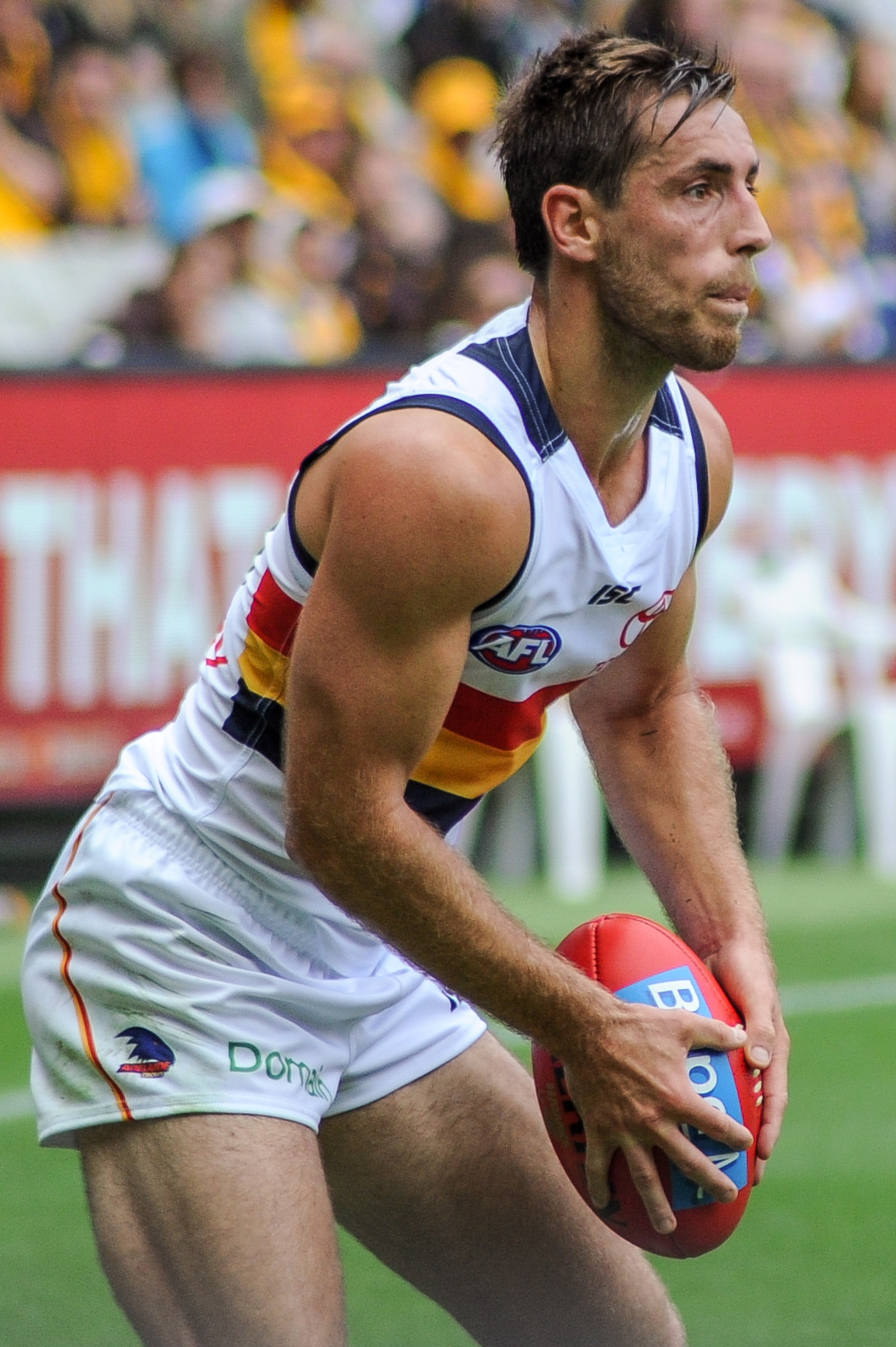
- Douglas playing for Adelaide in April 2017

Personal information
- Full name: Richard Joseph Edwin Douglas
- Born: 6 February 1987 (age 39); Melbourne, Victoria, Australia
- Original teams: Broadford (HDFL); Calder Cannons (TAC Cup)
- Draft: No. 16, 2005 national draft
- Debut: Round 21, 2006, Adelaide vs. Port Adelaide, at AAMI Stadium
- Height: 181 cm (5 ft 11 in)
- Weight: 80 kg (176 lb)
- Position: Midfielder / Forward

Playing career^{1}
Years	Club	Games (Goals)
2006–2019	Adelaide	246 (164)

International team honours^{2}
Years	Team	Games (Goals)
2011	Australia	2 (1)
- ^{1} Playing statistics correct to the end of 2019.^{2} Representative statistics correct as of 2011.

Career highlights
- Malcolm Blight Medal: (2010)

Richard Joseph Edwin Douglas (born 6 February 1987) is a former Australian rules football player who played for the Adelaide Football Club in the Australian Football League (AFL). He was drafted by Adelaide with pick 16 in the 2005 national draft.

== AFL career ==
After impressing for Glenelg in the SANFL, Douglas made his AFL debut in round 21 of 2006, his first season, against Port Adelaide. He played two further games for the season, including a Qualifying Final. Douglas established himself in the side over the next two years, playing 13 games in 2007 and 22 of a possible 23 games in 2008.

In June 2009, in the lead-up to Adelaide's clash with North Melbourne, Douglas had a scare when he began displaying symptoms consistent with the swine influenza pandemic, and was quarantined, along with teammate and housemate Tony Armstrong. On the night before the match, the test for swine flu came back negative; however, he did not play in the match. He returned to play the next match, although he was dropped from the side a few weeks later against Fremantle. He played 18 games in 2009 in total.

In 2010, Douglas was given more responsibility in an injury-hit Adelaide side. He relished the opportunity, winning the 2010 Malcolm Blight Medal (club best and fairest award) and the Coaches' Award in a standout year in which he played all 22 matches and also signed a new contract with the club.

After struggling to find consistency due to injuries in 2011 and early 2012, Douglas began to recapture his 2010 form towards the end of 2012. He signed a new three-year contract with Adelaide in June 2012, and played his 100th AFL match shortly after, in round 12 against St Kilda. Douglas had one of his best years at the club in 2013, finishing runner-up in the Malcolm Blight Medal and being named in the preliminary All-Australian squad. He ranked third in the competition for inside 50s, eighth for goal assists, and was second at the club for disposals, marks and tackles.

Douglas suffered a potentially serious groin injury in a trial game in the 2014 pre-season, but he surprisingly returned just three weeks later, wearing a cricket box in a match against Port Adelaide and collecting 29 disposals. He missed another two matches early in the season due to suspension after concussing Greater Western Sydney captain Callan Ward with a head-high bump, but he played every match for the remainder of 2014, averaging 22 disposals and starring in his 150th match against Collingwood in round 18. Douglas had his 2015 season interrupted by a foot injury and then appendicitis, but performed strongly when fit. In June he signed a new three-year deal with Adelaide, joining teammate Rory Sloane in committing to the club until the end of 2018, and declaring himself as "a Crow for life".

Douglas retired following Adelaide's 2019 season. He left the club with 246 games and a Malcolm Blight Medal.

== Post-AFL career ==
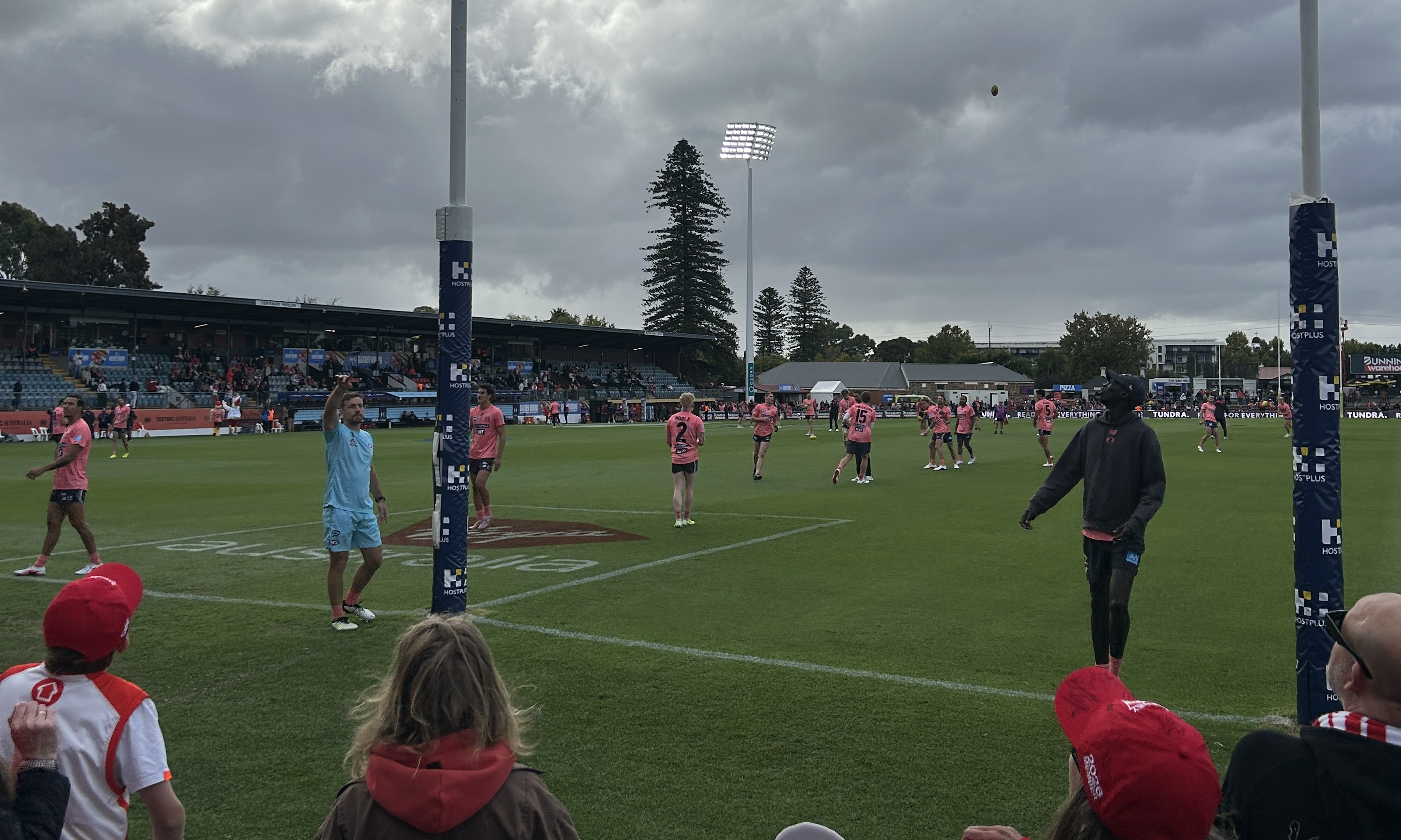
Douglas and Mac Andrew prior to the round 5, 2026 match between Gold Coast and Sydney

Following his retirement in 2019, Douglas joined Norwood ahead of the 2020 SANFL season. Representing the Redlegs as vice-captain, he tied with Brad McKenzie for the Michael Taylor Medal, awarded to the best-and-fairest player at Norwood, as well as being selected in the league Team of the Year. He departed the club in 2021 following 46 SANFL games.

During these years, Douglas also had roles at St Peter's College as the director of football coaching, and head development coach at the Simon Black Academy.

Douglas returned to Glenelg in 2023, holding two off-field positions. As senior men’s assistant coach and women's football operations and talent manager, he saw premierships for Glenelg's senior and reserves mens teams despite his short time at the club.

Gold Coast appointed Douglas as an AFL development coach ahead of the 2024 AFL season. As of 2026, he is the runner on match day for the Suns.

Douglas holds an advanced diploma in business and sport management.

== Statistics ==
Statistics are correct to end of the 2019 season

Legend
G	Goals	K	Kicks	D	Disposals	T	Tackles
B	Behinds	H	Handballs	M	Marks

Season	Team	No.	Games	Totals							Averages (per game)							Votes
Season	Team	No.	Games	G	B	K	H	D	M	T	G	B	K	H	D	M	T	Votes
2006	Adelaide	26	3	1	1	15	18	33	6	7	0.3	0.3	5.0	6.0	11.0	2.0	2.3	0
2007	Adelaide	26	13	4	2	72	68	140	28	36	0.3	0.2	5.5	5.2	10.8	2.2	2.8	0
2008	Adelaide	26	22	22	14	146	127	273	78	72	1.0	0.6	6.6	5.8	12.4	3.6	3.3	0
2009	Adelaide	26	18	11	12	133	140	273	74	64	0.6	0.7	7.4	7.8	15.2	4.1	3.6	3
2010	Adelaide	26	22	17	20	275	195	470	107	76	0.8	0.9	12.5	8.9	21.4	4.9	3.5	10
2011	Adelaide	26	17	10	9	221	91	312	63	56	0.6	0.5	13.0	5.4	18.4	3.7	3.3	0
2012	Adelaide	26	19	11	16	236	96	332	74	52	0.6	0.8	12.4	5.1	17.5	3.9	2.7	0
2013	Adelaide	26	22	20	17	326	175	501	116	86	0.9	0.8	14.8	8.0	22.8	5.3	3.9	3
2014	Adelaide	26	19	11	8	266	147	413	52	91	0.6	0.4	14.0	7.7	21.7	2.7	4.8	0
2015	Adelaide	26	16	7	4	204	135	339	47	65	0.4	0.3	12.8	8.4	21.2	2.9	4.1	0
2016	Adelaide	26	24	19	16	245	179	424	77	92	0.8	0.7	10.2	7.5	17.7	3.2	3.8	0
2017	Adelaide	26	25	15	9	317	224	541	71	96	0.6	0.4	12.7	9.0	21.6	2.8	3.8	1
2018	Adelaide	26	17	14	12	198	115	313	59	55	0.8	0.7	11.7	6.7	18.4	3.5	3.2	3
2019	Adelaide	26	9	2	3	84	52	136	27	22	0.2	0.3	9.3	5.8	15.1	3.0	2.4	0
Career			246	164	143	2738	1762	4500	879	870	0.6	0.6	11.1	7.2	18.3	3.6	3.5	20
