= Sam Jacobs (footballer) =

Australian rules footballer (born 1988)

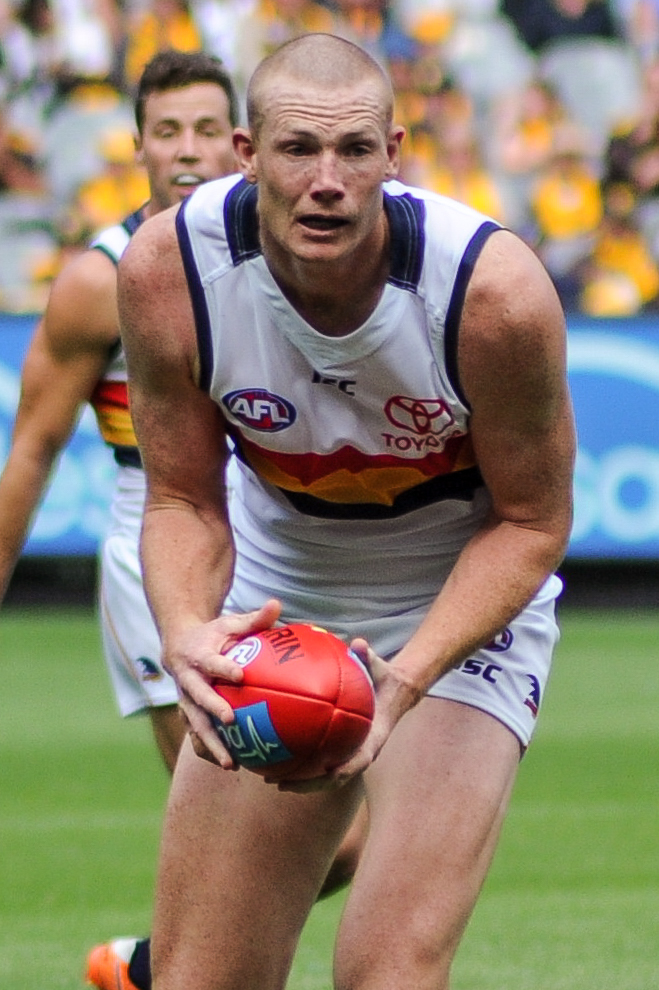
- Jacobs playing for Adelaide in April 2017

Personal information
- Full name: Sam Jacobs
- Nickname: Sauce
- Born: 10 April 1988 (age 38); Ardrossan, South Australia
- Original teams: Woodville-West Torrens (SANFL); Ardrossan Kangaroos
- Draft: No. 1, 2007 Rookie Draft
- Debut: Round 1, 2009, Carlton vs. Richmond, at MCG
- Height: 202 cm (6 ft 8 in)
- Weight: 102 kg (225 lb)
- Position: Ruckman

Playing career^{1}
Years	Club	Games (Goals)
2007–2010	Carlton	17 (3)
2011–2019	Adelaide	184 (45)
2020	Greater Western Sydney	7 (2)
Total		208 (50)

Coaching career^{3}
Years	Club	Games (W–L–D)
2024-2026	Woodville-West Torrens	58 (27–31–0)
- ^{1} Playing statistics correct to the end of 2020.^{3} Coaching statistics correct as of 2026.

Career highlights
- 3× Showdown Medal (round 15, 2012; round 15, 2014; round 20, 2017); 3x All Australian Squad (2012, 2014, 2017); Best Team Man (2012); NAB Cup Premiership (2012)

Sam Jacobs (born 10 April 1988) is a former professional Australian rules football player who played for the Carlton Football Club, Adelaide Football Club and Greater Western Sydney Giants in the Australian Football League (AFL).

Originally from Woodville-West Torrens in the South Australian National Football League (SANFL), Jacobs was selected by Carlton with pick 1 in the 2007 Rookie Draft. He was traded to Adelaide following the 2010 season. After the 2019 season, Jacobs was traded from Adelaide to the GWS Giants. He retired at the end of the 2020 season.

== AFL career ==
=== Carlton (2007–2010) ===
As a rookie-listed player, he played for Carlton's VFL-affiliate, the Northern Bullants, for the whole 2007 and 2008 seasons. Carlton retained Jacobs as a rookie in 2009; since rookie contracts are limited to two years, Carlton was forced to delist Jacobs, then redraft him, which they did with their sixth pick (number 76 overall) in the 2008 Rookie Draft. Jacobs played all four pre-season games for Carlton in the 2009 NAB Cup, and was made a nominated rookie prior the 2009 season, eligible to play AFL games. He made his debut in the first round of the season, against Richmond. He played only four games before succumbing to plantar fasciitis, causing him to miss most of the season. He returned from injury late in the year, finishing the season with the Northern Bullants, his ruckwork instrumental in getting the Bullants into the Grand Final, which they lost.

After three years as a rookie, Jacobs was promoted to the senior list at the end of the 2009 season. He played 13 games for the Blues and 10 for the Bullants during the 2010 season, again playing in a VFL Grand Final. At the end of the season, Jacobs requested to be traded back home to Adelaide. On 11 October, Jacobs was traded to the Crows in exchange for draft picks 34 (used for Patrick McCarthy) and 67 (used for Andrew McInnes).

=== Adelaide (2011–2019) ===
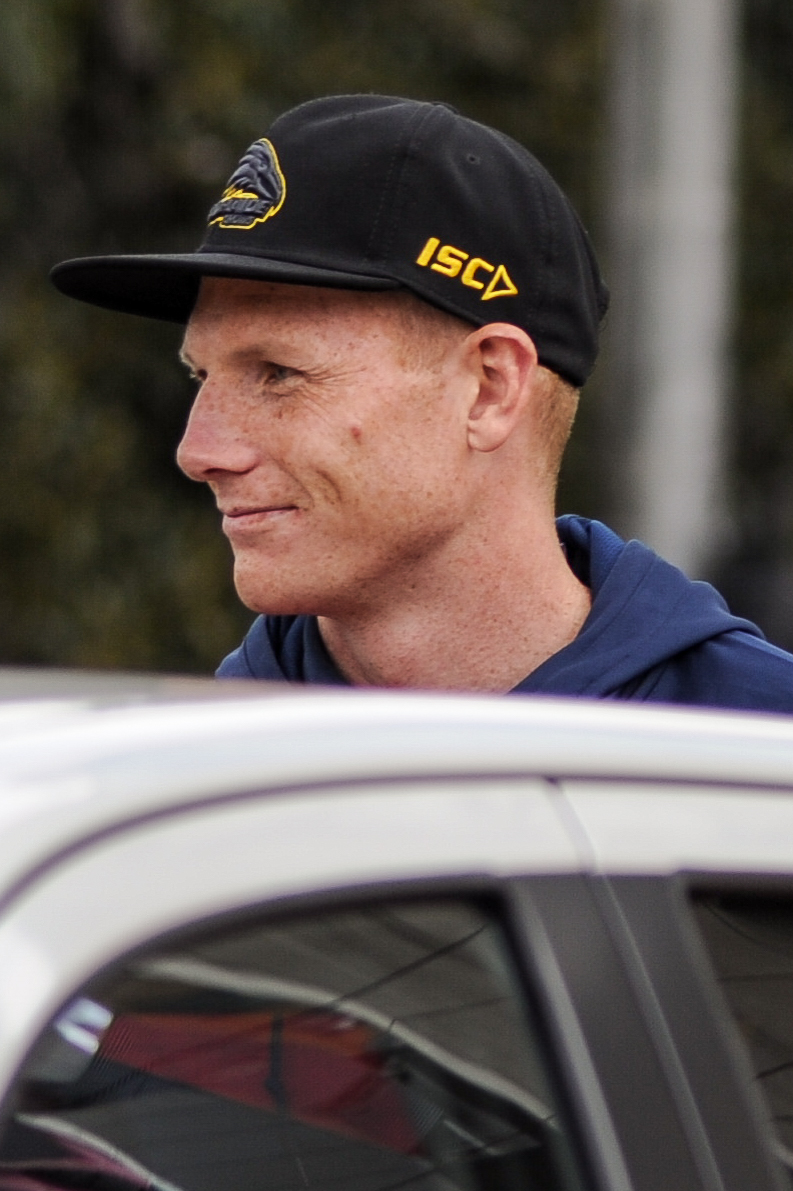
Jacobs at the 2017 AFL Grand Final parade.

Jacobs played his first game for Adelaide in round 5, 2011, and held his place for the rest of the season, establishing himself as the club's premier ruckman. He ranked fifth in the league for hit-outs, averaging 32 per game. Jacobs stepped up further in 2012, leading the competition in hit-outs and hit-outs to advantage, finishing fourth in the Club Champion count and winning the club's Best Team Man award, although he was surprisingly left out of the All-Australian team. His season included a then-record 61 hit-outs in a match against Port Adelaide in round 15, for which he was awarded the Showdown Medal.

Prior to the 2013 season, Jacobs signed a three-year contract extension keeping him at the Crows until the end of 2016. Jacobs had a quieter season in 2013 but still ranked third in the competition for hit-outs. In 2014 he was back to his best, leading the AFL in hit-outs to advantage and improving his presence around the ground, having more disposals, marks and rebound 50s than any other ruckman. He continued in the same fashion in 2015, setting a new club record for hit-outs in a season with 859. Towards the end of the season he extended his contract by another three years, to the end of 2019.

He had another standout year in 2017. He played well in Round 2 against Hawthorn then again in Round 6 against Richmond, where he dominated against Toby Nankervis, not only winning the hit-outs with a total of 50, but also getting 26 possessions, finding space in the midfield and helping to link up for the Crows. Playing against Melbourne in Round 8, in the absence of All-Australian ruckman Max Gawn to oppose him, Jacobs recorded a career-high 74 hit-outs. Unfortunately, the Crows' midfield struggled, mostly due to Rory Sloane being successfully tagged by ex-Crow Bernie Vince, so his effort didn't get the team the win. Jacobs continued to expand his influence outside of ruck contests, managing to get 25 disposals along with his 37 hit-outs in the Crows' Round 12 match against St Kilda.

A week before Adelaide's qualifying final against Greater Western Sydney, Jacobs' older brother Aaron died. He played against the Giants anyway and thoroughly outplayed his direct opponent Shane Mumford.

=== Greater Western Sydney (2020) ===
At the conclusion of the 2019 AFL season, Jacobs was traded to Greater Western Sydney. Jacobs struggled to break into the team due to the presence of Shane Mumford, and retired at the end of the 2020 AFL season.

== Statistics ==
Statistics are correct to end of the 2020 season

Legend
G	Goals	K	Kicks	D	Disposals	T	Tackles
B	Behinds	H	Handballs	M	Marks	H/O	Hit-outs
†	Led the league for the season

Season	Team	No.	Games	Totals								Averages (per game)								Votes
Season	Team	No.	Games	G	B	K	H	D	M	T	H/O	G	B	K	H	D	M	T	H/O	Votes
2009	Carlton	39	4	1	0	9	24	33	12	4	58	0.3	0.0	2.3	6.0	8.3	3.0	1.0	14.5	0
2010	Carlton	39	13	2	2	53	95	148	38	53	286	0.2	0.2	4.1	7.3	11.4	2.9	4.1	22.0	0
2011	Adelaide	24	19	3	8	110	129	239	83	57	611	0.2	0.4	5.8	6.8	12.6	4.4	3.0	32.2	0
2012	Adelaide	24	24	7	8	190	131	321	98	34	743	0.3	0.3	7.9	5.5	13.4	4.1	1.4	30.1	5
2013	Adelaide	24	22	4	5	143	105	248	71	42	622	0.2	0.2	6.5	4.8	11.3	3.2	1.9	28.3	0
2014	Adelaide	24	22	7	3	193	165	358	90	46	763	0.3	0.1	8.8	7.5	16.3	4.1	2.1	34.7	6
2015	Adelaide	24	23	4	6	205	151	356	97	46	859	0.2	0.3	8.9	6.6	15.5	4.2	2.0	37.4	4
2016	Adelaide	24	22	8	5	177	138	315	41	28	703	0.3	0.3	8.1	7.6	15.8	3.4	2.3	31.2	2
2017	Adelaide	24	25	9	7	198	162	360	93	69	996^{†}	0.4	0.3	7.9	6.5	14.4	3.7	2.8	39.8	10
2018	Adelaide	24	22	3	7	152	108	260	56	45	798	0.1	0.3	6.9	4.9	11.8	2.6	2.1	36.3	3
2019	Adelaide	24	5	0	3	30	27	57	12	13	178	0	0.6	6.0	5.4	11.4	2.4	2.6	35.6	0
2020 (Note: The 2020 season was played with 17 home-and-away matches per team (down from 22) and 16-minute quarters with time on (down from 20-minute quarters with time on) due to the impact of the COVID-19 pandemic.)	Greater Western Sydney	10	7	2	0	34	23	57	15	19	172	0.29	0	4.9	3.3	8.1	2.1	2.7	24.6	0
Career			208	50	54	1258	1258	2752	735	479	6789	0.2	0.3	7.2	6.1	13.2	3.5	2.3	32.6	30
