= Mark Ricciuto =

Australian rules footballer

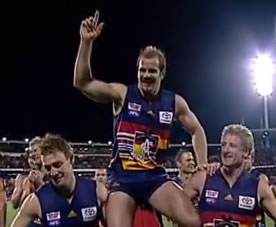

Personal information
- Full name: Mark Anthony Ricciuto
- Nickname: "Roo"
- Born: 8 June 1975 (age 51); Waikerie, South Australia
- Original team: West Adelaide
- Height: 184 cm (6 ft 0 in)
- Weight: 93 kg (205 lb)
- Positions: Midfielder, Forward

Playing career^{1}
| Years | Club | Games (Goals) |
| 1993–2007 | Adelaide | 312 (292) |

Representative team honours
| Years | Team | Games (Goals) |
| 1994–1999 | South Australia | 5 (2) |

International team honours
| 1998–2000 | Australia | 2 (0) |
- ^{1} Playing statistics correct to the end of 2007.

Career highlights
- AFL premiership player (1998); Brownlow Medal: 2003; 8× All-Australian (1994, 1997, 1998, 2000, 2002, 2003, 2004 (c), 2005(c)); 3× Malcolm Blight Medal (1998, 2003, 2004); Adelaide captain (2001–07); AFL Rising Star nominee (1993); South Australia team representative; 4× Showdown Medal (1998, 2000, 2004, 2005); 2× AFLPA best captain (2005, 2006); Adelaide leading goalkicker (2006); Adelaide Team of the Decade - half-forward flank; VFL/AFL Italian Team of the Century (named 2007); Australian Football Hall of Fame (inducted 2011); South Australian Football Hall of Fame (inducted 2012); 4x Merv Agars Medal (1996-1998, 2004)

Mark Anthony Ricciuto (/rɪˈtʃuːtoʊ/ ri-CHOO-toh; born 8 June 1975) is a former Australian rules footballer who played for the Adelaide Football Club in the Australian Football League (AFL). From Ramco, South Australia, Ricciuto started as a junior with the local Waikerie Magpies Football Club. He joined the West Adelaide Football Club in the South Australian National Football League (SANFL), making his debut at the age of 16, before being recruited by Adelaide as a zone selection prior to the 1993 season.

Playing as a midfielder, he established himself in Adelaide's side, receiving a nomination for the AFL Rising Star in 1993, his debut season, and being named in the All-Australian team the following season, the first of eight selections overall. Having played in Adelaide's premiership side in 1998, also winning the Malcolm Blight Medal as the club's best and fairest, Ricciuto replaced Mark Bickley as the club's captain prior to the 2001 season.

Consistently considered one of the best midfielders in the competition during the early 2000s (decade), Ricciuto shared the 2003 Brownlow Medal with Nathan Buckley and Adam Goodes, and was selected in the All-Australian team for four consecutive seasons between 2002 and 2005, captaining the side in both 2004 and 2005. Having played more of a forward role in his last two seasons, Ricciuto retired at the end of the 2007 season, having played a total of 312 games for Adelaide, kicking 292 goals.

Also representing South Australia in interstate football and Australia in the International Rules Series, Ricciuto was inducted into the Australian Football Hall of Fame in 2011, and the South Australian Football Hall of Fame in 2012.

== AFL career ==
=== Early career (1993–1996) ===
Ricciuto was born in Waikerie, South Australia. He was recruited by SANFL team West Adelaide and soon after – as a 16-year-old high schooler – was recruited by the Adelaide Crows in 1992. He debuted in the AFL in 1993. Ricciuto earned his first All-Australian selection as a 19-year-old in 1994.

=== Rising career (1997–2001) ===
After a stellar year in 1997 (in which he received his second All-Australian guernsey) he ended up missing the 1997 premiership due to a late season injury. Despite this setback, he rallied in 1998 to again be an All-Australian, win the club's best and fairest, and play in his only premiership. He was appointed as the Adelaide captain in 2001.

=== Career high (2002–2005) ===
In 2003, he was joint winner of the league's highest individual honor, the Brownlow Medal, with Collingwood's Nathan Buckley and Sydney's Adam Goodes. In 2004 he came second in the Brownlow medal. In 2004 and 2005 he earned his seventh and eighth All-Australian guernsey. However at the end of the 2005 season, Ricciuto was suspended following an incident in the Crows' final regular season match against West Coast; thus ruling him out of Brownlow Medal contention and the Crows' first qualifying final against fourth placed St Kilda, hampering the Crows' attempts at a straight path to the preliminary final. Indeed, the Crows lost this match by just eight points, and ultimately the Crows finished one match short of the 2005 decider.

=== Twilight career (2006–2007) ===
Late in the 2006 season, Ricciuto was ruled out of the Crows' final few matches due to a "mystery ailment" which was later found to be parvovirus B19. Nevertheless, Ricciuto led the Crows to their second straight top-two finish in 2006 and thus a more direct path to the preliminary final, again against the West Coast Eagles where again the Crows finished one match short of the decider, losing the preliminary final by just 10 points.

Ricciuto played his 300th AFL game on 21 July 2006 against North Melbourne. He kicked 5 goals in a game that Adelaide won by 72 points. He was quicker than any other player in AFL history to this milestone, in 13 years and 83 days, some 11 days quicker than Carlton's Craig Bradley.

=== Retirement ===
Ricciuto announced his retirement on 16 August 2007 due to persistent injuries. During his career, he amassed an incredible eight All-Australian selections, a record matched in the AFL era only by St Kilda's Robert Harvey, Sydney's Lance Franklin, Geelong's Patrick Dangerfield, and Melbourne's Max Gawn. Ricciuto was also twice named All-Australian captain in 2004 and 2005, joining Paul Kelly, Wayne Carey, and Michael Voss as the only multiple All-Australian Captains in the AFL era.

== Personal life ==
Ricciuto is noted for his Italian heritage, and bears a large tattoo of his family name on his back. His grandfather was born in the small Italian town of Fragneto Monforte.

On 19 January 2008, Ricciuto married Sarah Delahunt. They have two daughters, Sophie and Rosie, and four sons, Nick, Joe, Rocco and Tom.

== Post AFL career ==
In 2009, he played for Prince Alfred College Old Collegians in division 4 of the South Australian Amateur Football League.

Ricciuto played in the ANZAC day clash 2008 with Waikerie A grade against Loxton. Waikerie won the match by 38 points.

Ricciuto also played in the 2008 Riverland Grand Final with Waikerie against Renmark. In time on in the final quarter with not very much time left on the clock, Ricciuto kicked the 12th goal for Waikerie to seal back-to-back Premierships for Waikerie.

Ricciuto now works in the media is an AFL commentator for both Triple M and Fox Footy and also hosts the weekday Triple M breakfast show with former Australian world number 1 squash player Chris Dittmar and local media personality Laura O'Callaghan.

Ricciuto was inducted into the Australian Football Hall of Fame in 2011, and into the South Australian Football Hall of Fame in 2012.

In March 2014, a section of the Eastern Stand at Adelaide Oval was named after Ricciuto.

== Statistics ==
Legend
| G | Goals | K | Kicks | D | Disposals | T | Tackles |
| B | Behinds | H | Handballs | M | Marks |

| Season | Team | No. | Games | Totals | | | | | | | Averages (per game) | | | | | | |
| Season | Team | No. | Games | G | B | K | H | D | M | T | G | B | K | H | D | M | T |
|---|---|---|---|---|---|---|---|---|---|---|---|---|---|---|---|---|---|
| 1993 | Adelaide | 32 | 19 | 2 | 0 | 238 | 145 | 383 | 66 | 33 | 0.1 | 0.0 | 12.5 | 7.6 | 20.2 | 3.5 | 1.7 |
| 1994 | Adelaide | 32 | 21 | 23 | 15 | 285 | 142 | 427 | 118 | 27 | 1.1 | 0.7 | 13.6 | 6.8 | 20.3 | 5.6 | 1.3 |
| 1995 | Adelaide | 32 | 21 | 21 | 26 | 210 | 119 | 329 | 89 | 24 | 1.0 | 1.2 | 10.0 | 5.7 | 15.7 | 4.2 | 1.1 |
| 1996 | Adelaide | 32 | 22 | 9 | 9 | 267 | 188 | 455 | 97 | 19 | 0.4 | 0.4 | 12.1 | 8.5 | 20.7 | 4.4 | 0.9 |
| 1997 | Adelaide | 32 | 21 | 6 | 13 | 316 | 193 | 509 | 106 | 33 | 0.3 | 0.6 | 15.0 | 9.2 | 24.2 | 5.0 | 1.6 |
| 1998 | Adelaide | 32 | 24 | 22 | 25 | 386 | 183 | 569 | 111 | 35 | 0.9 | 1.0 | 16.1 | 7.6 | 23.7 | 4.6 | 1.5 |
| 1999 | Adelaide | 32 | 21 | 9 | 4 | 274 | 162 | 436 | 97 | 13 | 0.4 | 0.2 | 13.0 | 7.7 | 20.8 | 4.6 | 0.6 |
| 2000 | Adelaide | 32 | 22 | 20 | 10 | 334 | 247 | 581 | 104 | 43 | 0.9 | 0.5 | 15.2 | 11.2 | 26.4 | 4.7 | 2.0 |
| 2001 | Adelaide | 32 | 23 | 27 | 20 | 265 | 186 | 451 | 93 | 48 | 1.2 | 0.9 | 11.5 | 8.1 | 19.6 | 4.0 | 2.1 |
| 2002 | Adelaide | 32 | 22 | 35 | 15 | 261 | 190 | 451 | 86 | 67 | 1.6 | 0.7 | 11.9 | 8.6 | 20.5 | 3.9 | 3.0 |
| 2003 | Adelaide | 32 | 24 | 24 | 16 | 333 | 232 | 565 | 79 | 69 | 1.0 | 0.7 | 13.9 | 9.7 | 23.5 | 3.3 | 2.9 |
| 2004 | Adelaide | 32 | 22 | 17 | 17 | 305 | 230 | 535 | 87 | 44 | 0.8 | 0.8 | 13.9 | 10.5 | 24.3 | 4.0 | 2.0 |
| 2005 | Adelaide | 32 | 24 | 21 | 16 | 292 | 240 | 532 | 104 | 52 | 0.9 | 0.7 | 12.2 | 10.0 | 22.2 | 4.3 | 2.2 |
| 2006 | Adelaide | 32 | 17 | 44 | 26 | 158 | 87 | 245 | 102 | 18 | 2.6 | 1.5 | 9.3 | 5.1 | 14.4 | 6.0 | 1.1 |
| 2007 | Adelaide | 32 | 9 | 12 | 10 | 60 | 41 | 101 | 30 | 13 | 1.3 | 1.1 | 6.7 | 4.5 | 11.2 | 3.3 | 1.4 |
| Career | | | 312 | 292 | 222 | 3984 | 2585 | 6569 | 1369 | 538 | 0.9 | 0.7 | 12.8 | 8.3 | 21.1 | 4.4 | 1.7 |

== Honours and achievements ==
**Brownlow Medal votes**
| Season | Votes |
| 1993 | — |
| 1994 | 5 |
| 1995 | 5 |
| 1996 | — |
| 1997 | 18 |
| 1998 | 21 |
| 1999 | 1 |
| 2000 | 10 |
| 2001 | 7 |
| 2002 | 13 |
| **2003** | **22** |
| 2004 | 23 |
| 2005 | 11 |
| 2006 | 8 |
| 2007 | 2 |
| **Total** | **146** |
Key:
Green / **Bold** = Won

- **Team**
  - AFL Premiership (Adelaide): 1998
  - McClelland Trophy (Adelaide): 2005
- **Individual**
  - Brownlow Medal: 2003
  - All-Australian: 1994, 1997, 1998, 2000, 2002, 2003, 2004–2005 (captain)
  - Malcolm Blight Medal (Adelaide F. C. Best & Fairest): 1998, 2003, 2004
  - Adelaide F. C. Leading Club Goalkicker Award: 2006
  - Adelaide F. C. Captain: 2001–2007
  - AFLPA Best Captain Award: 2005, 2006
  - Showdown Medal: 2000, 2004, 2005
  - Australian Representative Honours in International Rules Football: 2000
  - **Italian Team of the Century - ruck-rover (captain)**
  - Australian Football Hall of Fame inductee: 2011
  - SA Football Hall of Fame Inductee: 2012
  - AFL Rising Star Nominee: 1993 (Round 16)
