= Luke Brown (footballer, born 1992) =

Australian rules footballer, born 1992

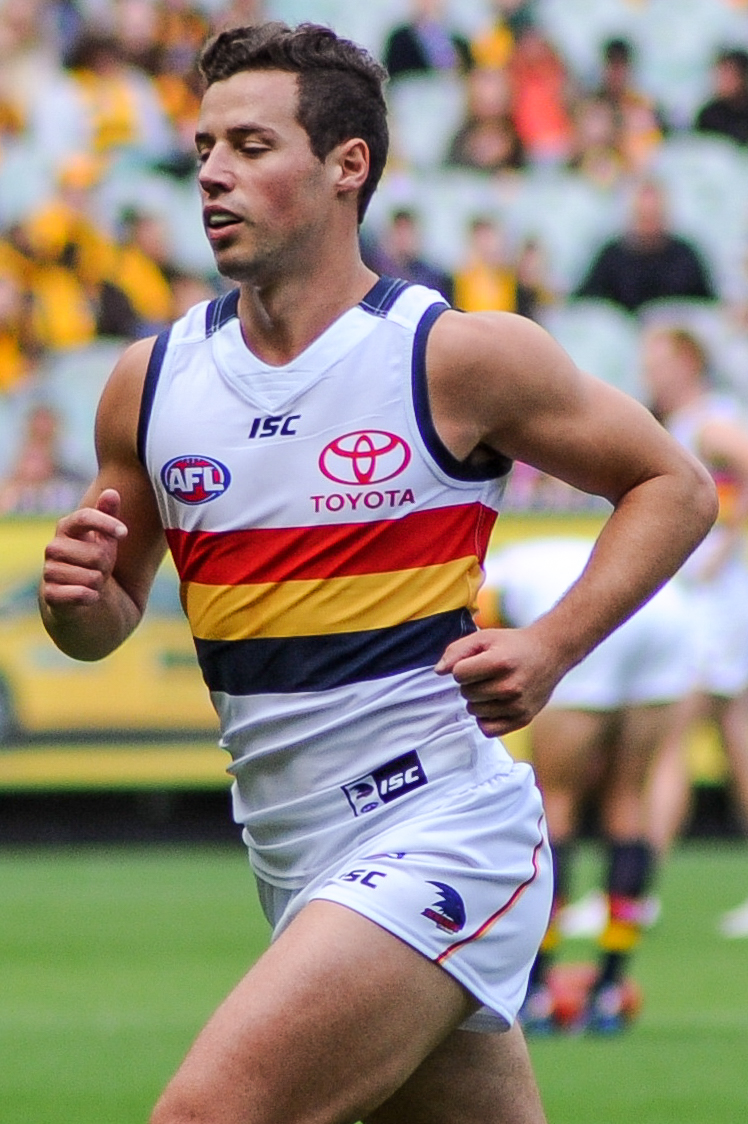
- Brown playing for Adelaide in April 2017

Personal information
- Full name: Luke Brown
- Born: 22 September 1992 (age 34)
- Original teams: Tea Tree Gully (SAAFL); Norwood (SANFL)
- Draft: 2011 pre-selection, Greater Western Sydney
- Debut: Round 16, 2012, Adelaide vs. Greater Western Sydney, at Sydney Showground Stadium
- Height: 181 cm (5 ft 11 in)
- Weight: 80 kg (176 lb)
- Position: Small defender

Playing career^{1}
Years	Club	Games (Goals)
2012–2022	Adelaide	189 (13)
- ^{1} Playing statistics correct to the end of 2021.

Career highlights
- 2013 AFL Rising Star nominee; SANFL premiership player: 2012

Luke Brown (born 22 September 1992) is a former professional Australian rules football player who played for the Adelaide Football Club in the Australian Football League (AFL). He was first recruited by incoming club Greater Western Sydney as a pre-selection and was then traded to Adelaide during the 2011 trade week.

== AFL career ==
After strong performances for Norwood in the SANFL, Brown was twice named an emergency for Adelaide in mid-2012. He ultimately made his debut in round 16, against Greater Western Sydney at Skoda Stadium, and went on to play three games for Adelaide that season as well as playing in the SANFL Grand Final for Norwood.

Brown established himself in Adelaide's team as a negating small defender in 2013, filling the role vacated by retired veteran Michael Doughty and playing 21 of a possible 22 games. He signed a two-year deal with the club early in the year, and was nominated for the 2013 AFL Rising Star award in the final round of the season. The young gun was rewarded for his breakout year with the Mark Bickley Award, awarded by the Adelaide Football Club to a first- or second-year player. Brown continued to play this role to great effect in 2014 and 2015, playing every game in both seasons, keeping the opposition's best small forward to a goal a game or less, and developing his attacking game with a disposal efficiency of 80.2% in 2015. During the year, Brown signed another two-year contract with Adelaide.

In 2020, in what was an otherwise forgettable year for the Crows who won their first wooden spoon, Brown finished third in the Malcolm Blight Medal.

During the finals series of the 2022 season, Brown announced his retirement after 189 AFL matches, which included being part of the 2017 losing team in the Grand Final.

== Statistics ==
Statistics are correct to end of 2022.

Legend
G	Goals	K	Kicks	D	Disposals	T	Tackles
B	Behinds	H	Handballs	M	Marks

Season	Team	No.	Games	Totals							Averages (per game)						
Season	Team	No.	Games	G	B	K	H	D	M	T	G	B	K	H	D	M	T
2012	Adelaide	16	3	0	0	12	7	19	9	2	0.0	0.0	4.0	2.3	6.3	3.0	0.7
2013	Adelaide	16	21	1	0	176	118	294	88	37	0.1	0.0	8.4	5.6	14.0	4.2	1.8
2014	Adelaide	16	22	1	1	138	148	286	55	54	0.1	0.1	6.3	6.7	13.0	2.5	2.5
2015	Adelaide	16	23	1	1	185	102	287	75	41	0.0	0.0	8.0	4.4	12.5	3.3	1.8
2016	Adelaide	16	22	5	2	232	133	365	90	63	0.2	0.1	10.6	6.1	16.6	4.1	2.9
2017	Adelaide	16	24	3	0	221	132	353	91	46	0.1	0.0	9.2	5.5	14.7	3.8	1.9
2018	Adelaide	16	20	1	2	214	88	302	83	43	0.1	0.1	10.7	4.4	15.1	4.2	2.2
2019	Adelaide	16	15	1	2	153	74	227	57	24	0.1	0.1	10.2	4.9	15.1	3.8	1.6
2020	Adelaide	16	17	0	1	141	56	197	46	35	0.0	0.1	8.3	3.3	11.6	2.7	2.1
2021	Adelaide	16	11	0	0	99	43	142	39	26	0.0	0.0	9.0	3.9	12.9	3.6	3.4
2022	Adelaide	16	11	0	0	86	60	146	38	21	0.0	0.0	7.8	5.5	13.3	3.5	1.9
Career			189	13	9	1657	961	2618	671	393	0.1	0.1	8.8	5.1	13.9	3.6	2.1

== Honours and achievements ==
Team

- McClelland Trophy (Adelaide): 2017
- SANFL premiership player (Norwood): 2012

Individual

- AFL Rising Star nominee: 2013
- Mark Bickley Award: 2013
