= Tyson Stenglein =

Australian rules footballer, born 1980

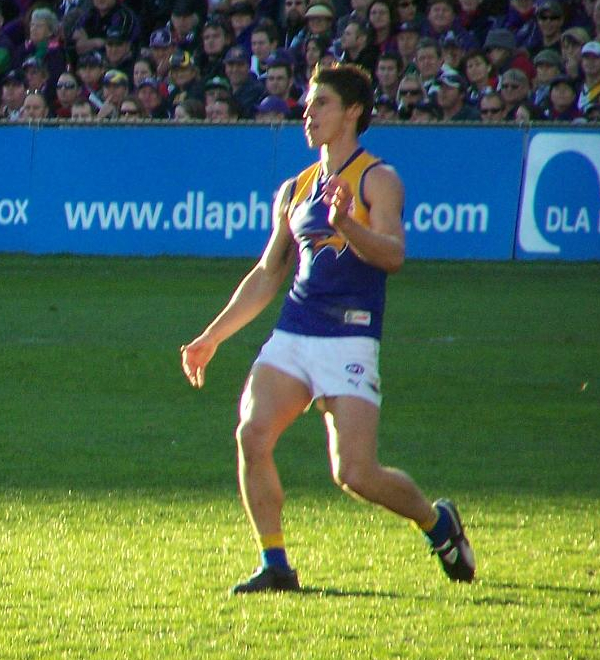

Personal information
- Full name: Tyson Steven Stenglein
- Born: 16 July 1980 (age 46)
- Original team: Subiaco (WAFL)
- Debut: Round 8, 16 May 1999, Adelaide Crows vs. West Coast Eagles, at Subiaco Oval
- Height: 189 cm (6 ft 2 in)
- Weight: 89 kg (196 lb)

Playing career^{1}
Years	Club	Games (Goals)
1999–2004	Adelaide	106 (26)
2005–2009	West Coast	102 (25)
Total		208 (51)
- ^{1} Playing statistics correct to the end of 2009.

Career highlights
- West Coast Eagles premiership side 2006

Tyson Steven Stenglein (born 16 July 1980) is an Australian rules footballer, who played for the Adelaide Crows and the West Coast Eagles in the Australian Football League (AFL).

== Adelaide career ==
Stenglein was originally recruited to the AFL by the Adelaide Crows at pick number 29 in the 1998 draft from the Subiaco Football Club in the WAFL, and debuted in his first season (1999) against the West Coast Eagles in round eight at Subiaco Oval in Perth.

After playing four games in his debut season, Stenglein became a regular in the Crows side the next year, playing nearly every game over a four-year period, becoming a highly rated player at the club, and indeed often touted as a potential club captain. After 106 games in six seasons at Adelaide he requested to be transferred back to a club in his home city of Perth, and was eventually traded to the Eagles in the trading period after the end of the 2004 season.

== West Coast Eagles career ==
Stenglein moved to West Coast leaving behind his strong fan base in Adelaide. At West Coast, Stenglein had an immediate impact, providing some hardness to a class midfield brigade, and almost immediately became a fixture in the team. In his first season, Stenglein was part of the Eagles' 2005 losing Grand Final team, a season in which he missed only three games.

During the turmoil of the West Coast Eagles 2006 pre-season, rumour suggested Stenglein was considered one of the possible choices to replace the disgraced Ben Cousins as club captain, but his lack of time at the club would have counted against him, and it was given to the obvious choice, champion Eagle Chris Judd. During the 2006 season, Stenglein played every match, eventually becoming an AFL Premiership player when selected in the West Coast Eagles Grand Final winning side.

After playing 11 games in 2009, the Eagles star announced his retirement on 11 September 2009 at the West Coast club champions awards night despite having a year left on his contract.

== Statistics ==
Legend
G	Goals	K	Kicks	D	Disposals	T	Tackles
B	Behinds	H	Handballs	M	Marks

Season	Team	No.	Games	Totals							Averages (per game)						
Season	Team	No.	Games	G	B	K	H	D	M	T	G	B	K	H	D	M	T
1999	Adelaide	20	4	0	1	21	6	27	7	3	0.0	0.3	5.3	1.5	6.8	1.8	0.8
2000	Adelaide	20	15	2	6	91	95	186	48	34	0.1	0.4	6.1	6.3	12.4	3.2	2.3
2001	Adelaide	20	21	4	6	148	98	246	68	32	0.2	0.3	7.0	4.7	11.7	3.2	1.5
2002	Adelaide	20	23	6	8	197	181	378	89	69	0.3	0.3	8.6	7.9	16.4	3.9	3.0
2003	Adelaide	20	21	7	2	151	122	273	48	67	0.3	0.1	7.2	5.8	13.0	2.3	3.2
2004	Adelaide	20	22	7	8	192	163	355	87	75	0.3	0.4	8.7	7.4	16.1	4.0	3.4
2005	West Coast	5	22	9	6	216	147	363	106	79	0.4	0.3	9.8	6.7	16.5	4.8	3.6
2006	West Coast	5	26	10	2	275	203	478	133	126	0.4	0.1	10.6	7.8	18.4	5.1	4.8
2007	West Coast	5	21	3	4	233	230	463	96	104	0.1	0.2	11.1	11.0	22.0	4.6	5.0
2008	West Coast	5	22	1	1	166	158	324	65	89	0.0	0.0	7.5	7.2	14.7	3.0	4.0
2009	West Coast	5	11	2	1	63	96	159	34	43	0.2	0.1	5.7	8.7	14.5	3.1	3.9
Career			208	51	45	1753	1499	3252	781	721	0.2	0.2	8.4	7.2	15.6	3.8	3.5
