= Rory Sloane =

Australian rules footballer (born 1990)

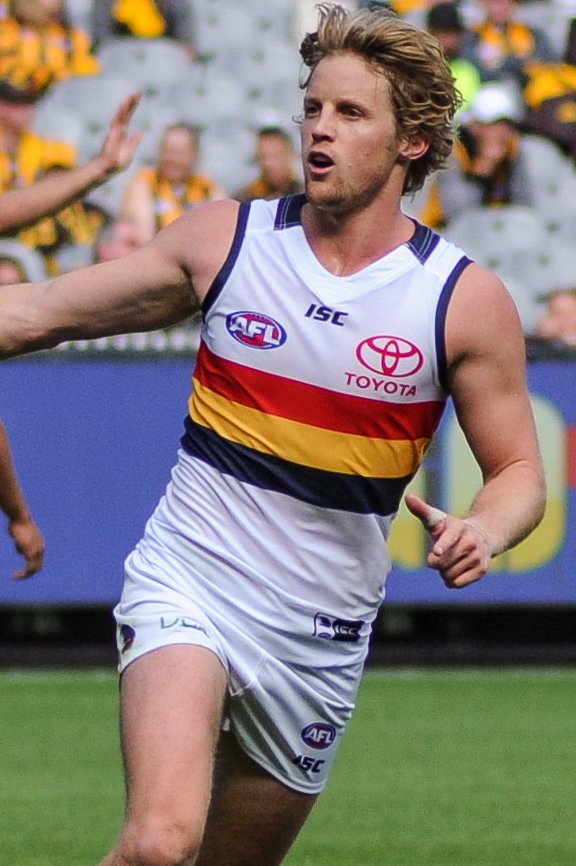
- Sloane playing for Adelaide in 2017

Personal information
- Full name: Rory Brandon Sloane
- Born: 17 March 1990 (age 36); Melbourne, Victoria
- Original team: Eastern Ranges (TAC Cup)
- Draft: No. 44, 2008 national draft
- Debut: Round 20, 2009, Adelaide vs. Hawthorn, at the Melbourne Cricket Ground
- Height: 183 cm (6 ft 0 in)
- Weight: 82 kg (181 lb)
- Position: Midfielder

Playing career
Years	Club	Games (Goals)
2009–2024	Adelaide	255 (136)

Representative team honours
Years	Team	Games (Goals)
2020	Victoria	1 (0)

International team honours
2017	Australia	2 (0)

Career highlights
- Adelaide Co-Captain: 2019; Captain: 2020–2022; All-Australian team: 2016; Malcolm Blight Medal: 2013, 2016; Robert Rose Award: 2017; Showdown Medal: 2017 (game 1); 22under22 team: 2012

Rory Brandon Sloane (born 17 March 1990) is a former professional Australian rules footballer who played for the Adelaide Football Club in the Australian Football League (AFL). Sloane is a dual Malcolm Blight Medallist, was selected in the All-Australian team in 2016, and won a Showdown Medal in 2017. Sloane served as Adelaide co-captain in 2019 and its sole captain from 2020 to 2022.

== Early life ==
Rory Brandon Sloane was born on 17 March 1990 in Victoria.

Growing up, Sloane supported the St Kilda Football Club. He was first part of TAC Cup side Eastern Ranges under-18 side when he was only 16, and went on to captain Eastern Ranges in 2008. He was drafted by Adelaide with pick 44 in the 2008 AFL draft.

== AFL career ==
=== 2009–2012: Early career ===
Sloane strained a medial ligament in his knee prior to the start of the 2009 season but upon returning quickly forced his way into the North Adelaide seniors in the SANFL and showed strong form, prompting Adelaide coach Neil Craig to comment, "He'll be an exciting player for us in the future…our supporters will like Rory Sloane." Sloane made his AFL debut in round 20 against Hawthorn. He did not record a kick but had seven tackles.

Sloane played his second game in round 1, 2010, but sustained a serious ankle injury during the clash against Fremantle which saw him out of the side for several weeks. He returned to play 14 matches for the season, averaging more than 15 disposals as a midfielder. He also signed a new contract with the Crows during the year.

For the second consecutive year, Sloane was injured in the first game in 2011, against Hawthorn, and was sidelined for several weeks with a fractured jaw and broken thumb. After returning, Sloane played out the remainder of the season, averaging 20 disposals and 5 tackles per game, including a 36-possession game against eventual premiers Geelong in round 21. He continued his emergence as a star midfielder in 2012, averaging 22 possessions and earning three Brownlow votes for best-on-ground in crucial wins over Sydney and Fremantle. Midway through the year, he revealed he had signed a three-year deal with the Crows, saying, "The way Brenton [Sanderson] and the rest of the coaching staff have gone about creating this really enjoyable environment for us to be involved in - I think that's a big reason why everyone wants to stay around". Sloane lifted his game yet again in 2013, averaging 23.5 possessions, winning the Malcolm Blight Medal for the best and fairest Crows player, and polling 15 votes in the Brownlow Medal.

=== 2013–2018: Personal and club success ===
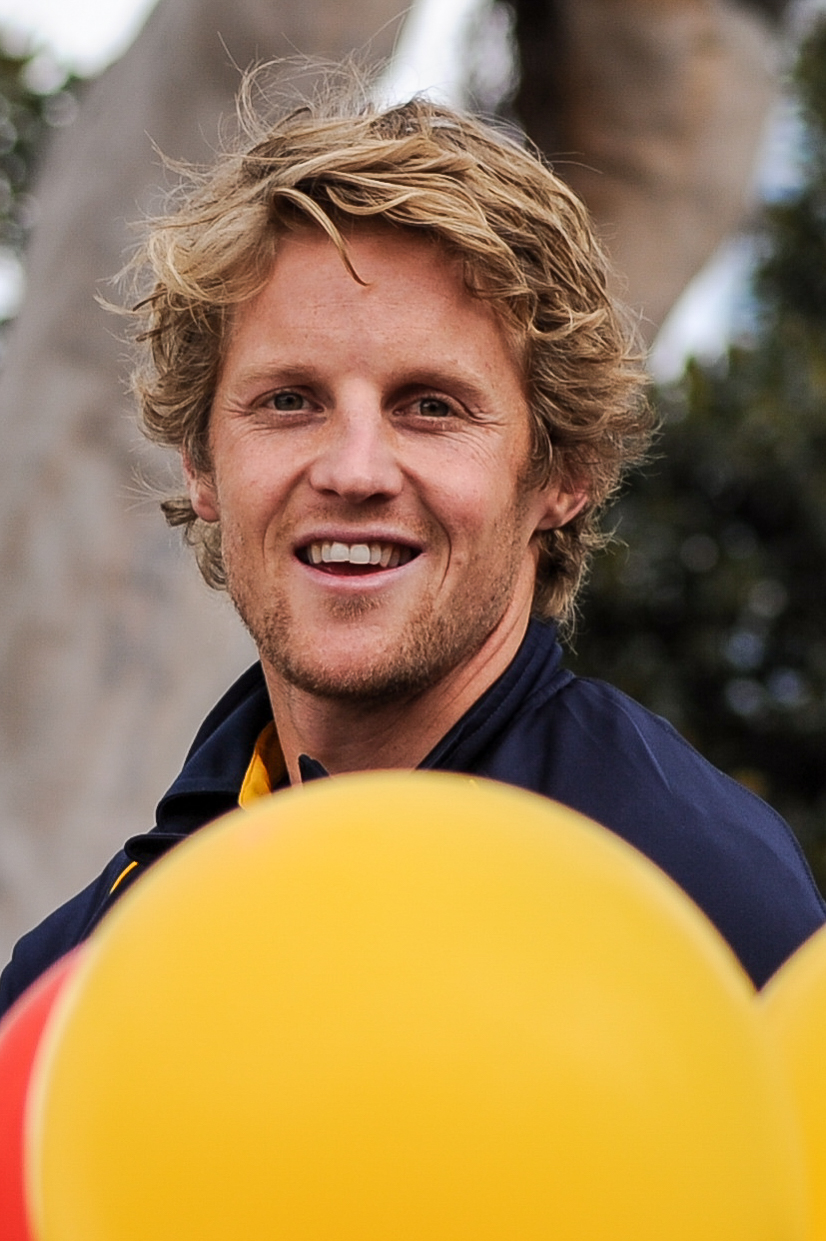
Sloane during the 2017 AFL Grand Final parade

Due to the season-ending Achilles injury sustained by captain Nathan van Berlo during pre-season training in 2014, Sloane and Patrick Dangerfield were named as acting co-captains of the Adelaide Football Club for the 2014 season. Sloane continued to thrive in 2014, finishing second in the Malcolm Blight Medal behind Daniel Talia. He played his 100th AFL game in round 23 against St Kilda.

In June 2015, Sloane signed a three-year contract extension with Adelaide, keeping him at the club until 2018. Sloane twice injured his cheekbone during the season, missing a total of five games, but despite that remained one of the club's elite players, finishing sixth in Adelaide's best and fairest.

Sloane had an outstanding year in 2016, averaging 25 disposals and leading the club in contested possessions and tackles. He was considered a contender for the Brownlow Medal before being suspended for rough conduct late in the season, rendering him ineligible for the award. Sloane was rewarded with his second Malcolm Blight Medal as the club's best and fairest player, and was also named vice-captain in the 2016 All-Australian team while being the runner-up in the AFLPA Most Valuable Player award.

Sloane had an outstanding start to 2017, winning the Showdown Medal in round 3 and averaging 29.5 disposals per game while the Crows remained undefeated in the first six rounds. He started to struggle when other teams began heavily tagging him, Melbourne notably playing ex-Crow Bernie Vince on him, causing the Crows to lose their next two matches. Sloane worked hard to improve against these tags, but again he struggled against Melbourne in round 17 when Vince kept him to just 8 possessions before he was knocked out in a Dean Kent tackle and sat out the rest of the game. Before Adelaide's qualifying final against Greater Western Sydney, Sloane had surgery to have his appendix removed and was forced to miss the match. Sloane's strong performances throughout the season were respected by his teammates, who nominated him for both the AFL Players' Association MVP Award and the Most Courageous Award.

Sloane's future was up in the air during the 2018 season as multiple clubs were eager to lure him back to his home state in Victoria, with Collingwood looming as a likely suitor. However, in a move that surprised many, Sloane re-signed for a further five years to commit the rest of his career to Adelaide.

=== 2019–2024: Captaincy and late career ===
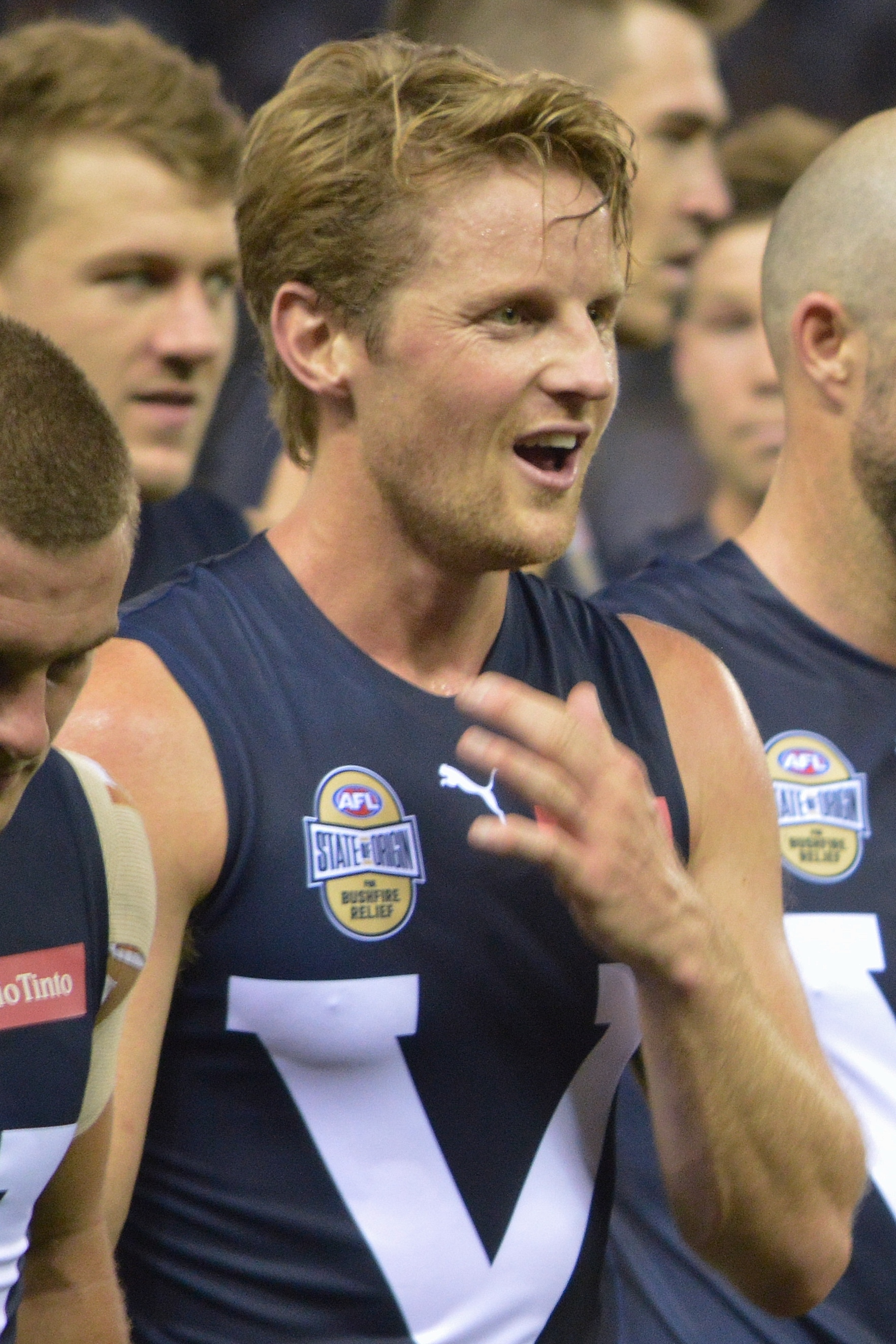
Sloane post-match with Victoria in 2020

In 2019, Sloane was appointed as co-captain of the Adelaide Football Club alongside Taylor Walker.

In 2020, Sloane assumed the sole captaincy and in round one played his 200th AFL game against the Sydney Swans at the Adelaide Oval, which the Crows lost by three points. Despite the club's least successful year in their history, Sloane continued to serve as captain during the majority of Adelaide's games and amassed 3 Brownlow votes.

Sloane injured his knee in Adelaide's win over Richmond in round 5 of the 2022 season; scans later confirmed a ruptured anterior cruciate ligament, forcing him to miss the rest of the season. The role of club captain was rotated between Tom Doedee, Ben Keays, Reilly O'Brien and Brodie Smith. Prior to the 2023 season, Sloane handed over the captaincy to emerging recruit Jordan Dawson and stepped down from the leadership group entirely. Sloane played his 250th game in a loss to Greater Western Sydney at the Adelaide Oval in 2023.

Following a mid-season surgery for the same issue in 2021, Sloane again went under surgery for a detached retina. Although his recovery appeared to be progressing better than in 2021, Sloane announced his retirement in April 2024, choosing to prioritise his long-term health and wellbeing. His 255th and final game was played in a narrow loss to Sydney in round 23 of the 2023 season. At the time of his retirement, Sloane had played the 10th-most games of any Adelaide player and amassed the fourth-most Brownlow Medal votes for Adelaide with 108.

== Media and post-playing career ==
Sloane featured in the 2021 fly-on-the-wall documentary TV series Making Their Mark, which showed the impact of the COVID-19 pandemic on several AFL clubs, players, and staff. Nic Naitanui and Eddie Betts were filmed almost continuously, with other players featured including Stephen Coniglio and Sloane, along with several coaches and other staff associated with the clubs.

In January 2025, it was announced that Sloane would join the Nine Network as a panellist on Footy Classified and The Sunday Footy Show. He also joined the South Australian National Football League (SANFL) in 2025 as the Juniors Ambassador.

== Personal life ==
Sloane has an older brother named Dylan and a younger sister named Shae, a former professional footballer for Melbourne and volleyballer for Australia.

Sloane has a strong friendship with fellow draftee Taylor Walker. They played 199 games together for Adelaide until Sloane's retirement in 2024. Their families are very close, with their children being similar ages.

Sloane is husband to wife Belinda Sloane, née Riverso. The couple married in October 2016. Rory and Belinda had four children together; Leo, Sonny, Bodhi, and Summer. Tragically, the couple's first son Leo was stillborn after the 34th week of pregnancy. Sloane's third son Bodhi has the middle name Leo to commemorate their first.

== Statistics ==
Legend
G	Goals	K	Kicks	D	Disposals	T	Tackles
B	Behinds	H	Handballs	M	Marks
†	Led the league for the season

Season	Team	No.	Games	Totals							Averages (per game)							Votes
Season	Team	No.	Games	G	B	K	H	D	M	T	G	B	K	H	D	M	T	Votes
2009	Adelaide	31	1	0	0	0	6	6	1	7	0.0	0.0	0.0	6.0	6.0	1.0	7.0	0
2010	Adelaide	31	14	7	8	88	124	212	44	49	0.5	0.6	6.3	8.9	15.1	3.1	3.5	0
2011	Adelaide	9	18	11	11	181	184	365	73	91	0.6	0.6	10.1	10.2	20.3	4.1	5.1	4
2012	Adelaide	9	24	19	6	301	222	523	113	101	0.8	0.3	12.5	9.3	21.8	4.7	4.2	11
2013	Adelaide	9	21	12	12	257	237	494	113	83	0.6	0.6	12.2	11.3	23.5	5.4	4.0	15
2014	Adelaide	9	22	13	9	269	252	521	105	147	0.6	0.4	12.2	11.5	23.7	4.8	6.7	10
2015	Adelaide	9	18	11	3	192	208	400	78	100	0.6	0.2	10.7	11.6	22.2	4.3	5.6	4
2016	Adelaide	9	23	13	10	271	309	580	88	163	0.6	0.4	11.8	13.4	25.2	3.8	7.1	24
2017	Adelaide	9	24	20	7	314	267	581	75	187^{†}	0.8	0.3	13.1	11.1	24.2	3.1	7.8	20
2018	Adelaide	9	12	5	5	126	137	263	33	75	0.4	0.4	10.5	11.4	21.9	2.8	6.3	6
2019	Adelaide	9	22	11	9	266	275	541	97	129	0.5	0.4	12.1	12.5	24.6	4.4	5.9	7
2020 (Note: The 2020 season was played with 17 home-and-away matches per team (down from 22) and 16-minute quarters with time on (down from 20-minute quarters with time on) due to the impact of the COVID-19 pandemic.)	Adelaide	9	12	5	3	92	97	189	15	49	0.4	0.3	7.7	8.1	15.8	1.3	4.1	3
2021	Adelaide	9	18	3	2	198	204	402	67	87	0.2	0.1	11.0	11.3	22.3	3.7	4.8	2
2022	Adelaide	9	4	0	1	36	36	72	12	17	0.0	0.3	9.0	9.0	18.0	3.0	4.3	0
2023	Adelaide	9	22	6	2	212	187	399	69	113	0.3	0.1	9.6	8.5	18.1	3.1	5.1	2
2024	Adelaide	9	0	—	—	—	—	—	—	—	—	—	—	—	—	—	—	0
Career			255	136	88	2803	2745	5548	983	1398	0.5	0.3	11.0	10.8	21.8	3.9	5.5	108

== Honours and achievements ==
Team

- McClelland Trophy/AFL minor premiership (Adelaide): 2017
- NAB Cup: 2012 (Adelaide)

Individual

- Adelaide co-captain: 2019; captain: 2020–2022
- All-Australian team: 2016
- 2× Malcolm Blight Medal: 2013, 2016
- Robert Rose Award: 2017
- Australia representative honours in international rules football: 2017
- Victoria representative honours in State of Origin for Bushfire Relief Match
- Showdown Medal: 2017 (game 1)
- 22under22 team: 2012
