= Mark Bickley =

Australian rules footballer, born 1969

Personal information
- Full name: Mark Alan Bickley
- Born: 4 August 1969 (age 57); Port Pirie, South Australia
- Original team: Solomontown Football Club
- Height: 178 cm (5 ft 10 in)
- Weight: 82 kg (181 lb)

Playing career^{1}
Years	Club	Games (Goals)
1989–1991	South Adelaide (SANFL)	53 (43)
1991–2003	Adelaide	272 (77)
Total		325 (120)

Representative team honours
Years	Team	Games (Goals)
	South Australia	7 (?)

International team honours
2002–03	Australia	3 (?)

Coaching career^{3}
Years	Club	Games (W–L–D)
2011	Adelaide	6 (3–3–0)
- ^{1} Playing statistics correct to the end of 2003.^{3} Coaching statistics correct as of 2011.

Career highlights
- Club: 2× AFL premiership captain (1997, 1998); Adelaide Captain 1997-2000; 3× Adelaide Football Club Best Team Man (1992, 1993, 2000); Adelaide Football Club Life Member; Adelaide Team of the Decade - Back Pocket; South Australian Football Hall of Fame; Australian Football Hall of Fame; Australian Football League Life Member; Adelaide Football Club Hall Of Fame; Representative: Australian National Football Carnival Championship: 1993

Mark Alan Bickley (born 4 August 1969) is a former Australian rules footballer who played for the Adelaide Football Club in the Australian Football League (AFL). Bickley was a player for the Crows from 1991 until 2003, captaining the team to both the 1997 and 1998 AFL premierships. He was a media commentator, most notably with Channel 9 in Adelaide as their sports presenter. In 2011 he had a brief coaching career as caretaker coach of the Crows after the retirement of Neil Craig.

== Playing career ==
=== Adelaide Crows ===
Recruited from South Australian National Football League (SANFL) club South Adelaide, Bickley made his AFL debut in 1991 against Essendon at Windy Hill, as an inaugural member of the Adelaide Crows squad. In 1997 he was appointed captain of the Adelaide Football Club, and captained the 1997 and 1998 premiership sides.

After retiring from the AFL in 2003, he began presenting the weekend sports report on Nine News Adelaide alongside Georgina McGuinness, and in 2004 he became a panellist on the Nine Network's Sunday Footy Show.

== Coaching career ==
In 2009, Bickley became an assistant coach at the Crows, thus ending his career on the Sunday Footy Show and Nine News.

=== Adelaide Crows ===
In the 2011 season, Bickley took over as caretaker senior coach at Adelaide after Neil Craig stepped down at the end of Round 18. His reign as Adelaide coach began with a convincing win over Port Adelaide in Showdown XXXI. It was just their fifth win of the season, and their second since the end of April. This was followed up with a narrow 5-point victory over the Brisbane Lions at the Gabba in Round 20, for the Crows' first win outside of Adelaide this season. Overall, Bickley coached Adelaide to three wins and three losses, the last of those a 96-point loss to West Coast. At the end of the 2011 season, Bickley was not retained as Adelaide Football Club senior coach and was replaced by Brenton Sanderson as the senior coach of Adelaide Crows.

In November 2014, Mark Bickley joined the 5AA talk radio station as a co-host of the top rating weeknight sports show.

Bickley stepped away from full-time radio in 2021, and currently coaches the Immanuel College, Adelaide First XVIII football side.

In December 2022, Bickley joined radio station SEN SA as co-host of the breakfast show.

In February 2024, Bickley was appointed “Club Engagement Officer” at Adelaide Football Club.

== Statistics ==
Legend
G	Goals	K	Kicks	D	Disposals	T	Tackles
B	Behinds	H	Handballs	M	Marks

Season	Team	No.	Games	Totals							Averages (per game)						
Season	Team	No.	Games	G	B	K	H	D	M	T	G	B	K	H	D	M	T
1991	Adelaide	26	18	3	7	168	142	310	47	19	0.2	0.4	9.3	7.9	17.2	2.6	1.1
1992	Adelaide	26	22	3	1	265	247	512	73	37	0.1	0.0	12.0	11.2	23.3	3.3	1.7
1993	Adelaide	26	23	13	9	297	266	563	93	63	0.6	0.4	12.9	11.6	24.5	4.0	2.7
1994	Adelaide	26	11	2	4	150	100	250	34	28	0.2	0.4	13.6	9.1	22.7	3.1	2.5
1995	Adelaide	26	22	2	4	217	178	395	52	42	0.1	0.2	9.9	8.1	18.0	2.4	1.9
1996	Adelaide	26	22	8	6	263	208	471	76	61	0.4	0.3	12.0	9.5	21.4	3.5	2.8
1997	Adelaide	26	26	12	21	351	197	548	84	80	0.5	0.8	13.5	7.6	21.1	3.2	3.1
1998	Adelaide	26	23	10	11	270	160	430	74	64	0.4	0.5	11.7	7.0	18.7	3.2	2.8
1999	Adelaide	26	18	7	4	174	152	326	54	25	0.4	0.2	9.7	8.4	18.1	3.0	1.4
2000	Adelaide	26	20	5	9	240	139	379	61	50	0.3	0.5	12.0	7.0	19.0	3.1	2.5
2001	Adelaide	26	23	2	5	285	149	434	74	62	0.1	0.2	12.4	6.5	18.9	3.2	2.7
2002	Adelaide	26	20	5	5	242	185	427	85	54	0.3	0.3	12.1	9.3	21.4	4.3	2.7
2003	Adelaide	26	24	5	4	241	191	432	79	73	0.2	0.2	10.0	8.0	18.0	3.3	3.0
Career			272	77	90	3163	2314	5477	886	658	0.3	0.3	11.6	8.5	20.1	3.3	2.4

== Head coaching record ==
Team	Year	Home and Away Season					Finals			
Team	Year	Won	Lost	Drew	%	Position	Won	Lost	Win %	Result
ADE	2011	3 (Note: Neil Craig resigned on July 25th 2011 following a 103-point shellacking at the hands of St Kilda in round 18 which dropped the Crows to 4-12 on the season. Bickley coached out the remainder of the season with a 3-3 record. Thus, the first 16 games are credited to Craig and the final 6 to Bickley.)	3	0	.500	14th out of 17	-	-	-	-
Total		3	3	0	.500		-	-	-	
