= History of the Adelaide Football Club =

The history of the Adelaide Football Club dates back to their founding in 1990, when the Australian Football League (AFL) approved a license application by the South Australian National Football League (SANFL) to base a new club out of Adelaide, South Australia in the expanding AFL competition. The club also operates a side in the AFL Women's competition, which held its first season in 2017.

== History ==
=== Formation ===
Throughout the 1980s, the Victorian Football League (VFL) began to expand outside of Victoria, firstly by the relocation of a team into New South Wales (Sydney Swans) in 1982, and then the expansion into Western Australia (West Coast Eagles) and Queensland (Brisbane Bears) in 1987. However, the SANFL was against a South Australian team joining the VFL under the financial terms offered throughout the 1980s. To circumvent this, the VFL negotiated directly with both the Port Adelaide and Norwood Football Clubs during the late 1980s, but did not come to an agreement.

After the VFL was renamed the AFL for the 1990 season, the SANFL clubs unanimously resolved, in May 1990, that a team would not be entered into the AFL until season 1993. The AFL refused to accept this, and revised negotiations with individual clubs Port Adelaide and Norwood. Two months later, the Port Adelaide Football Club reached terms of agreement with the AFL to enter a team into its competition in season 1991. The other nine SANFL clubs reacted strongly and entered into litigation in an endeavour to halt Port's bid.

As the terms offered were more favourable than previously offered, talks were resumed. On 19 September 1990, the AFL approved the bid for a new South Australian club to enter the league, rather than a single existing SANFL club.

=== 1990s: Beginnings and premiership success ===
==== 1991 season ====
The Adelaide Crows played their first season in the AFL in 1991. Their inaugural coach was Graham Cornes and their first captain was Chris McDermott.

Adelaide's first AFL game was against Hawthorn on Friday 22 March at their then home ground, Football Park (later renamed AAMI Stadium). The Crows defeated the eventual premiers by a hefty 86-point margin, winning 24.11 (155) to 9.15 (69). The Crows went on to finish in ninth place out of 15 teams on the AFL ladder, with 10 wins and 12 losses and a percentage of 89.44.

Mark Mickan won the club's first Club Champion award (later named the Malcolm Blight Medal) for the club's best and fairest player throughout the season, with Tony McGuinness finishing runner-up. Rod Jameson was the club's leading goalkicker with 49, while Nigel Smart was named in the AFL All-Australian team.

==== 1992 season ====
The Crows again finished in ninth place in 1992, with an 11–11 win–loss record and a percentage of 101.36.

Chris McDermott won the Club Champion award from Tony McGuinness, while Scott Hodges led the club's goalscoring with 48 goals, including a haul of 11 against Geelong in round 23. McDermott, McGuinness and defender Ben Hart were all named in the 1992 All-Australian team.

During the post-season trading period, Adelaide traded in future dual premiership player Matthew Robran from Hawthorn for pick 11 in the national draft, as well as receiving Sydney's Stuart Wigney for pick 71.

==== 1993 season ====
Adelaide finished fifth on the ladder after the home-and-away season in 1993, with 12 wins and 8 losses and a percentage of 117.83, including a home record of 9 wins out of 10 at Football Park. The Crows had to defeat Collingwood at home in the last match of the season to make the top six and thus qualify, and despite conceding six goals to one in the first quarter they did so by 24 points, 19.21 (135) to 17.9 (111).

Under the McIntyre final six system in use, Adelaide travelled to play against fourth-placed Hawthorn at the MCG the next week, in the First Elimination Final. With Nigel Smart kicking four goals, Adelaide won 16.14 (110) to 13.17 (95). Because sixth-placed West Coast had defeated third-placed North Melbourne, Adelaide progressed to the second semi-final against Carlton at Waverley Park, with a double-chance ensuring they would not be knocked out of the finals by a loss. The Crows lost to Carlton by 18 points, 13.8 (86) to 8.20 (68), and thus had to play Essendon in the Preliminary Final, with the winner to play Carlton in the grand final. Whilst technically a Crows home game, the match was played at the MCG due to an agreement with the Melbourne Cricket Club that a match had to be played at the MCG during every week of the finals. Against Essendon, the Crows led by 42 points at half-time before collapsing to lose by 11: 17.9 (111) to 14.16 (100). Adelaide player Mark Bickley later suggested that the players' poor performance during the second half may have been caused by the team's lack of concentration and resolve during the coach's half time address. The loss ended the Crows' season, while Essendon then went on to defeat Carlton a week later and thus win the Premiership.

Tony McGuinness won the Club Champion award from Mark Bickley, while full-forward Tony Modra kicked a club record 129 goals for the season, including finals, to be the club's leading goalkicker. Modra also was awarded the AFL Mark of the Year for his spectacular mark in round 8 against North Melbourne at Football Park. McGuinness, Modra, Greg Anderson, Ben Hart and Nigel Smart were all named in the All-Australian team for 1993. The AFL Rising Star award was also first awarded in 1993, with Mark Ricciuto being nominated for his 28-disposal performance against Richmond in round 16.

After the 1993 season, Adelaide traded in Hawthorn's Tony Hall and Collingwood's Brett Chalmers, in exchange for draft picks 17 and 34, respectively.

==== 1994 season ====
Adelaide started the 1994 season by making the final of the pre-season knockout competition. In the competition, then known as the Foster's Cup, they played Essendon in the final and lost, 15.12 (102) to 9.14 (68).

In 1994, Adelaide missed the finals for the third year out of four in the competition, finishing in 11th place with 9 wins and a draw from their 22 matches, and a percentage of 86.89. Adelaide's draw against St Kilda at Waverley Park in round 14 remains their only draw in the AFL to date.

Shaun Rehn was the club's Club Champion in 1994 with Tony McGuinness finishing runner-up. Tony Modra kicked 70 goals to finish as the club's leading goalscorer, while Rehn and Mark Ricciuto were both All-Australians, and Matthew Kluzek and Sean Wellman achieved Rising Star nominations. Following the season, coach Graham Cornes was sacked and replaced by Robert Shaw, while Tony McGuinness replaced Chris McDermott as captain.

During the off-season, Adelaide secured future champion Andrew McLeod in a trade with new club Fremantle, in exchange for Chris Groom. They also traded for Collingwood's Jason McCartney for draft picks 9 and 53, and West Coast's Matthew Connell for pick 44. The Crows also recruited future premiership players Peter Vardy (pick 7) and Tyson Edwards (pick 21) in the 1995 pre-season draft.

==== 1995 season ====
In 1995, Adelaide again made the final of the pre-season competition, by this stage known as the Ansett Cup. They defeated Geelong, West Coast and Sydney before losing to North Melbourne in the final, 14.9 (93) to 8.15 (63).

For the second successive season, Adelaide finished in 11th place on the AFL ladder, with a win–loss record of 9–13 and percentage of 80.08. Matthew Connell won the Club Champion award from Andrew Jarman, while Tony Modra again led the Crows' goalscoring with 42 goals. Modra also became the first Crow to kick the AFL Goal of the Year, achieving the feat against Richmond. No Crows were selected in the 1995 All-Australian team. Martin McKinnon and Andrew McLeod were both nominated for the Rising Star award.

In the post-season trading period, the Crows secured Hawthorn premiership player Darren Jarman, brother of Andrew Jarman, in a complicated deal that saw them give up national draft pick 25 to Hawthorn and Sean Wellman to Essendon. Adelaide also traded in Kym Koster (Footscray) for pick 9, Troy Bond (Carlton) for pick 63 and Peter Caven (Sydney) for Paul Rouvray, and drafted Kane Johnson (pick 27, national draft), Shane Ellen (pick 8, pre-season draft) and Simon Goodwin (pick 18, pre-season draft); all would become premiership players for the club.

==== 1996 season ====
Adelaide started the 1996 season in good form, winning their first four matches and six of their first eight. However, they won just two more matches for the season: home matches against the Brisbane Bears and Fitzroy. They finished the season in 12th position, with 8 wins, 14 losses and a percentage of 95.96. 7 of these wins were at home; away from home they defeated only last-placed Fitzroy, in round 2.

The Club Champion for 1996 was awarded to Matthew Liptak from Nigel Smart, while Darren Jarman was Adelaide's sole All-Australian representative. No Crows were nominated for the 1996 Rising Star award. For the fourth season in a row, Tony Modra topped Adelaide's goalkicking with 75. Ben Hart was awarded the AFL Mark of the Year for his mark against St Kilda in Round 8.

Coach Robert Shaw was replaced at the end of the season by former Woodville and North Melbourne player Malcolm Blight. Blight made an immediate impact upon arriving at the club, delisting captain Tony McGuinness and fan favourite Andrew Jarman in addition to retiring former captain Chris McDermott. Mark Bickley was appointed McGuinness' replacement as captain.

During the off-season, Adelaide traded in Brett James (Collingwood) for Jonathon Ross; Trent Ormond-Allen and Clay Sampson (Melbourne) for pick 83 and Nick Pesch; Tim Cook, Aaron Keating and Nick Laidlaw (Port Adelaide) for Scott Hodges and David Brown; and Barry Standfield (Footscray) for picks 32 and 47. Notable draftees included future premiership players Andrew Eccles (pick 60, national draft), Chad Rintoul (pick 69, national draft) and Ben Marsh (pick 5, rookie draft).

==== 1997 season ====
1997 marked the entry of a second South Australian club, Port Adelaide. The lingering resentment from the circumstances surrounding Adelaide's entry to the competition created a healthy rivalry between the teams, and clashes between them became known as Showdowns.

Adelaide started the 1997 season by defeating the newly formed Brisbane Lions (created by the merging of the Brisbane Bears and Fitzroy) but then lost three consecutive games, including an 11-point loss to Port Adelaide in the first Showdown in Round 4, 11.17 (83) to 11.6 (72). However, Adelaide rebounded to win 11 of their next 15 matches, including five in a row between rounds 7 and 11. After defeating Port Adelaide by 7 points in round 19, Adelaide were top of the ladder with three matches to play; however, they won just one of those three games and qualified for the finals in fourth place with a 13–9 record.

At the time the McIntyre final eight system was in use, meaning the Crows hosted fifth-placed West Coast in the First Elimination Final. In the first final ever to be played at Football Park, the Crows won 14.15 (99) to 9.12 (66). The next week, Adelaide hosted Geelong, who had come second but lost the previous week to North Melbourne, in the second semi-final, winning narrowly: 11.10 (76) to 9.14 (68). This set up an away Preliminary Final against the Western Bulldogs at the MCG. Despite losing Coleman Medallist Tony Modra, who had kicked 84 goals for the season, to an ACL injury in the first quarter and trailing by 31 points at half time, the Crows kicked four unanswered goals in the last quarter to record a two-point victory, 12.21 (93) to 13.13 (91), with Darren Jarman kicking a goal to put Adelaide in front with less than two minutes remaining. This allowed the Crows to qualify for their first AFL Grand Final, to be played against St Kilda at the MCG a week later.

St Kilda, chasing their second Premiership in VFL/AFL history, were warm favourites to win the Grand Final, having come first in the minor round and won both of their finals by margins of 46 and 31 points, against an Adelaide side without Tony Modra, Mark Ricciuto and goalsneak Peter Vardy due to injury. However, the Crows again overcame a half-time deficit, kicking 14 second-half goals to win by 31 points, 19.11 (125) to 13.16 (94). Darren Jarman kicked six goals, five of which came in the last quarter, whilst utility Shane Ellen kicked a career-best five and Troy Bond kicked four. Andrew McLeod, who gathered 31 possessions across half-back and in the midfield, won the Norm Smith Medal for the best player on-field in the grand final.

Andrew McLeod was the Crows' Club Champion in 1997, while Darren Jarman was runner-up. In addition to winning the Coleman Medal and being the club's leading goalkicker for the fifth straight season, Tony Modra was also awarded the AFL Mark of the Year for the second time, for his mark on the goal line over Mick Martyn against North Melbourne at Football Park in Round 12. Modra was also named at full-forward in the All-Australian team, while Mark Ricciuto was named on the interchange bench. Kane Johnson and Peter Vardy both achieved Rising Star nominations.

In the post-season trading period Adelaide received Nathan Bassett from Melbourne for Matthew Collins and Brent Williams, Mark Stevens from North Melbourne for Jason McCartney and Ian Downsborough from Port Adelaide for Brett Chalmers. The Crows drafted Lance Picioane with their first national draft pick at 17; he would play only 4 AFL games for the Crows and 77 in total. Other notable draftees included future premiership player James Thiessen at pick 33 and Ian Perrie at pick 49. Ben Marsh was also re-drafted as a rookie at pick 16.

==== 1998 season ====
For the second successive season, the Crows started slowly in 1998, winning just three of their first eight matches. From there they improved their win–loss record to 13–9, the same as the previous year. They did not seal their place in the top eight until the final round, when they defeated West Coast at Subiaco Oval by 25 points to clinch fifth place. Adelaide struggled throughout the season to win close matches; seven of their nine losses were by 13 points or less, compared to only three wins by corresponding margins.

The Crows travelled to face Melbourne at the MCG in the First Qualifying Final and were defeated easily, 17.13 (115) to 9.13 (67). However, as the highest-placed loser under the McIntyre final eight system they received a reprieve, and travelled to the SCG to play Sydney. With Peter Vardy kicking six goals, Adelaide won 14.10 (94) to 10.7 (67). This led them, for the second year in a row, to play the Western Bulldogs in a Preliminary Final at the MCG. In contrast to the thriller that took place the previous year, however, the Crows defeated the Bulldogs soundly, 24.17 (161) to 13.15 (93). Matthew Robran kicked six goals and Andrew McLeod, opposed to renowned tagger Tony Liberatore, booted seven.

Like the previous year, Adelaide went into the Grand Final as underdogs, playing against North Melbourne, who had won the Premiership in 1996 and had won eleven consecutive matches leading up to the grand final. North Melbourne led by 24 points at half-time, 6.15 (51) to 4.3 (27), with only their inaccurate goalkicking keeping Adelaide in the contest. However, as they had in the previous year, Adelaide dominated the second half to win by 35 points, 15.15 (105) to 8.22 (70). Darren Jarman kicked five goals, while Andrew McLeod won his second successive Norm Smith Medal, an unprecedented feat.

Mark Ricciuto won the Crows' Club Champion award in 1998, while Nigel Smart was runner-up. Ricciuto, Smart, Andrew McLeod and Shaun Rehn were all named in the All-Australian side, while Andrew Eccles was nominated for the AFL Rising Star award. Darren Jarman was Adelaide's leading goalkicker with 45. At the end of the season, Adelaide traded star forward Tony Modra to Fremantle, as well as Chad Rintoul to West Coast, for draft picks. In the national draft, Adelaide drafted future 100-game players Brett Burton (pick 16), Tyson Stenglein (pick 29) and Ken McGregor (pick 75).

==== 1999 season ====
The Crows made a good start to their premiership defence in 1999 with four wins in the first six rounds, before struggling for the rest of the season, winning only four more games. They eventually finished 13th with an 8–14 win–loss record, their lowest ever finish at the time, and the lowest finish by a reigning premier in VFL/AFL history.

Malcolm Blight resigned as coach at the end of the season, to be replaced by Gary Ayres, while popular defender (and inaugural leading goalkicker) Rod Jameson also played his final game in Adelaide's round 22 loss to the Kangaroos (newly renamed from North Melbourne). The Crows' Club Champion award, renamed the Malcolm Blight Medal in Blight's honour, was won by Ben Hart from Andrew McLeod. Hart was also Adelaide's only All-Australian representative. David Gallagher and Brett Burton both received AFL Rising Star nominations, while Darren Jarman led Adelaide's goalkicking for the second consecutive year with 58 goals.

In the off-season, Adelaide traded for Brisbane Lions ruckman Matthew Clarke, giving up picks 6 and 21, and the Kangaroos' Scott Welsh for pick 77, while trading Lance Picioane to Hawthorn for pick 79. Future stars Rhett Biglands (pick 36) and Robert Shirley (pick 67) were drafted in the 1999 national draft, and Michael Doughty was the club's first rookie selection at pick 4.

=== 2000s: Near misses ===
==== 2000 season ====
Adelaide lost their first five matches in 2000, placing them at the bottom of the AFL ladder at this stage. This continued after they had lost the last four games of the previous season; their nine-game losing streak overall remained a club record until the COVID-19 affected 2020 season. Adelaide then won seven of the next nine matches, improving their win–loss record to 7–7 after round 14, at which point they moved into the top eight. However, the Crows finished poorly, eventually finishing 11th with a 9–13 record. At the end of the season, Mark Bickley stepped down as captain, and Mark Ricciuto took over.

Simon Goodwin won the Malcolm Blight Medal in 2000, with Andrew McLeod finishing runner-up. Scott Welsh led the club's goalscoring with 47. Goodwin, McLeod and Ricciuto were named in the All-Australian team, while Ian Perrie was nominated for the Rising Star award. The Crows traded away premiership ruckman Shaun Rehn to Hawthorn at the end of the season, receiving draft pick 12 which they on-traded to Port Adelaide for Matthew Bode. Adelaide also traded pick 23 for the Kangaroos' Evan Hewitt. Indigenous 200-game defender Graham Johncock was drafted with Adelaide's final pick in the national draft, number 67 overall.

==== 2001 season ====
Adelaide showed inconsistent form in 2001; after losing their opening three matches, they won 12 of their next 18 to seal their first finals spot since 1998 with a round to spare. By defeating bottom-placed Fremantle, who had won just one match for the season, at Subiaco Oval in the final round, the Crows could have had a chance to host a final under the new top eight system implemented in 2000, but they lost by 37 points and finished in eighth place with a 12–10 record. Adelaide won just six matches at home in 2001, an equal club worst at the time, but won a club best six matches outside of South Australia.

Adelaide played fifth-placed Carlton at the MCG in the First Elimination Final. They had defeated Carlton twice during the year, but Carlton turned the tables by eliminating Adelaide, 17.16 (118) to 6.14 (50). Their 68-point loss was their worst losing margin of the season, and Darren Jarman announced his retirement after the match.

In addition to finishing runner-up to Jason Akermanis in the 2001 Brownlow Medal, Andrew McLeod won the Malcolm Blight Medal from Mark Stevens, becoming the Medal's first dual winner. Darren Jarman kicked 40 goals to top the Crows' goalkicking, while McLeod and Simon Goodwin were named in the All-Australian team. Adelaide did not receive any Rising Star nominations in 2001.

The 2001 off-season was a busy one for the Crows. They traded away premiership-winning small forward Peter Vardy to Melbourne for pick 56, on-trading that pick to Fremantle for Daniel Schell. They also received young key forward Ryan Fitzgerald from Sydney for pick 28, who would play only eight games for Adelaide due to injury, but would later become a popular radio and television personality and a high-profile supporter of the club. Finally, the Crows received Carlton's Kris Massie and Ben Nelson in exchange for Andrew Eccles and David Gallagher.

With Adelaide's first pick in the 2001 national draft, they drafted 200-game player Brent Reilly at pick 12. They also used their rookie picks particularly well in this year: Nathan Bock (pick 25), Ben Rutten (pick 40) and Martin Mattner (pick 51) would all become renowned players at AFL level. Finally, in the pre-season draft, the Crows chose Trent Hentschel at pick 5.

==== 2002 season ====
Adelaide won their first three matches in 2002, and despite a mid-season slump of three losses in a row (Rounds 12–14) they finished the season in third place with a 15–7 win–loss record, both club bests at the time. The Crows won all 13 of their matches against teams that did not make the finals, but only two out of nine matches against fellow top eight teams: a 7-point triumph over reigning (and eventual) Premiers the Brisbane Lions in Round 10 and a 48-point victory over Essendon in Round 19, both at Football Park.

Under the AFL final eight system, the Crows faced second-placed Brisbane at the Gabba in the Second Qualifying Final and lost by 71 points, 17.13 (115) to 5.14 (44). Due to finishing in the top four, Adelaide received a double chance and a "home" Semi-final against Melbourne, played at the MCG due to the MCC agreement. Adelaide led by 40 points at quarter time, before the Demons rallied, taking a 29-point lead late in the third quarter. However, the Crows responded with a final-quarter surge to win by 12 points, 20.10 (130) to 17.16 (118). The win gave them a Preliminary Final berth against Collingwood at the MCG. Adelaide led in the second quarter but Collingwood surged to win, 13.13 (91) to 9.9 (63), progressing to the grand final at Adelaide's expense. Collingwood would lose to Brisbane the following week in the first of successive Grand Finals to be contested by the two teams.

Ben Hart won his second Malcolm Blight Medal in 2002, with Tyson Edwards finishing runner-up. Brett Burton led the Crows' goalkickers with 51. Hart and Mark Ricciuto were both named as All-Australians, while for the second successive season, Adelaide had no Rising Star nominees.

In the off-season, Adelaide secured the services of champion centre half forward Wayne Carey in a trade with the Kangaroos. This was achieved by a three-way deal along with Richmond, where homesick midfielder Kane Johnson and several draft picks went to Richmond and Richmond's top two draft picks, 2 and 18, were traded to the Kangaroos. Adelaide also received Richmond defender Jason Torney as part of the deal. The Crows also traded for veteran Geelong small forward Ronnie Burns, giving up Ben Finnin in exchange. Robert Shirley was re-drafted by the club at pick 56 in the national draft, while Jason Porplyzia was drafted for the first time at pick 29 in the rookie draft.

==== 2003 season ====
Adelaide started 2003 by winning the pre-season competition for the first time in their history. They defeated Port Adelaide, West Coast and the Kangaroos before facing Collingwood in the final, which they won, 2.13.0.8 (104) to 1.9.1.7 (73). (An explanation of scoring is given on this page.)

Adelaide again made the finals in 2003, winning nine matches out of eleven between Rounds 9 and 19 to sit second on the ladder with a 13–6 record with three rounds to play. However, they lost all three of those matches to finish in sixth position. Eight of Adelaide's nine losses were by three goals or less, including a 5-point loss to Collingwood at the newly renamed AAMI Stadium in Round 7, where Chris Tarrant kicked the winning goal after the siren.

Adelaide faced seventh-placed West Coast at AAMI Stadium in the Second Elimination Final and won easily, 16.17 (113) to 8.9 (57). This set up an away Semi-final against the Brisbane Lions at the Gabba, which the Crows lost, 18.16 (124) to 12.10 (82): their greatest losing margin of the season. This game marked the final appearance for dual premiership captain Mark Bickley. Brisbane went on to defeat Sydney and then Collingwood to claim their third successive Premiership.

In 2003, Adelaide captain Mark Ricciuto became the first Crow to win the Brownlow Medal for the best and fairest player in the AFL in a three-way tie with Adam Goodes and Nathan Buckley. He also won his second Malcolm Blight Medal from Tyson Edwards, and was Adelaide's sole All-Australian for the year. Graham Johncock led the club's goalkicking with 30, one ahead of Wayne Carey who booted 29. For the third year in a row, no Crows were nominated for the Rising Star award in 2003. At the end of the season, Adelaide traded for Sydney key position player Scott Stevens, trading away picks 29 and 45. Their most notable draftee in that year's national draft was mature-aged ruckman Ben Hudson, taken at pick 58.

==== 2004 season ====
Adelaide lost their first four matches in 2004, at which point they sat on the bottom of the AFL ladder. Victories over Richmond, Port Adelaide and Hawthorn lifted them off the bottom but they failed to win successive matches in the first half of the season. Wayne Carey suffered a serious neck injury in Adelaide's Round 12 loss to West Coast at Subiaco Oval, which left them with a 3–9 record. Carey announced his retirement soon afterwards, having played 28 games and kicked 56 goals for the club. Nigel Smart, the last remaining player from Adelaide's inaugural match against Hawthorn in 1991, also announced he would retire after the following week's match against Western Bulldogs at AAMI Stadium. The Crows won the match by 32 points, after which coach Gary Ayres was told his contract would not be renewed at the end of the season. Ayres elected to resign immediately, and assistant coach Neil Craig was appointed caretaker coach for the remainder of the season.

In Craig's first match as senior coach, Adelaide thrashed Melbourne, at the time second on the ladder, by 72 points at AAMI Stadium. The Crows lost their next three matches, including a club record 141-point loss to the Brisbane Lions at the Gabba, but rebounded to win three of their last five. Ultimately the Crows finished 12th on the ladder with an 8–14 record, including 4-5 under Craig, who was appointed Adelaide's senior coach from 2005.

Mark Ricciuto was the Malcolm Blight Medal winner for the second consecutive year, and his third overall, while Tyson Stenglein finished runner-up. Ricciuto was also the team's only All-Australian representative for the second year running, and became the first Crow to be named All-Australian captain. Brent Reilly became Adelaide's first Rising Star nominee since 2000, for his performance in Adelaide's home loss to Fremantle in Round 16. Scott Welsh topped the club's goalkicking with 36.

During the off-season, Stenglein requested a trade to his home state, Western Australia, and was traded to West Coast for draft picks 12 and 28. Adelaide on-traded pick 12 to secure the services of young midfielder Scott Thompson from Melbourne. In the national draft, Adelaide selected future captain Nathan van Berlo with their second pick at 24 overall, and also drafted Ivan Maric (pick 40) and Chris Knights (pick 56).

==== 2005 season ====
2005 AFL Home & Away Season	W	L	D	Total	%
Adelaide	17	5	0	68	136.5
	Minor Premiers

2005 saw Adelaide have their best home and away season in the history of the club, finishing 17–5 and winning the club's first ever McClelland Trophy for finishing atop the ladder after the home-and-away season. The Crows had started promisingly after the disappointment of 2004 winning 4 of their first 6 matches, and gathered momentum as the season progressed, winning 10 matches in a row from rounds 13 to 22. The last of these was a stunning eight-point victory over hot premiership favourites West Coast at Subiaco Oval, in a match that saw them leapfrog the Eagles into top spot.

The Crows were brought crashing down to earth in their First Qualifying Final against fourth placed St Kilda at AAMI Stadium. In a tough, low-scoring contest Adelaide missed the leadership of captain Mark Ricciuto, suspended for striking Adam Selwood the previous week, and despite a late fightback they lost by eight points: 10.5 (65) to 8.9 (57). The loss set up a sudden death Semi-final against Port Adelaide, the reigning Premiers. The Crows regained Ricciuto, and in front of a crowd of 50,521 they defeated Port by a Showdown record margin of 83 points: 18.15 (123) to 5.10 (40). As a result, Adelaide faced a Preliminary Final match against West Coast at Subiaco, where they had won just three weeks before. In another tough game in windy conditions, West Coast broke away with five goals to one in a decisive third quarter, and again a final-quarter comeback was in vain as the Eagles ended Adelaide's season, 14.9 (93) to 11.11 (77). West Coast would then lose the grand final to Sydney the next week by just four points. Adelaide joined Essendon (1999) and Port Adelaide (2002 and 2003) as recent AFL minor premiers who had failed to make the grand final.

The Malcolm Blight Medallist for 2005 was Simon Goodwin, who won the award from Nathan Bassett, his second after having won it in 2000. For the second successive year, Scott Welsh led the goalscoring with 58 goals including finals. Ricciuto was All-Australian captain for the second year in a row, selected on a half-forward flank, while Ben Rutten was full-back and Goodwin was named on the interchange bench. No Crows were nominated for the Rising Star award. Adelaide traded Fergus Watts to St Kilda for pick 17 over the off-season. Notable players drafted in the 2006 national draft included future club champions Richard Douglas (pick 16) and Bernie Vince (pick 32), while Jason Porplyzia was drafted for the second time at pick 9 in the pre-season draft.

==== 2006 season ====
2006 saw the Crows start the season in dominant fashion. Narrow losses to West Coast in round 2 and Richmond in round 8 – the latter noted for Richmond's controversial but successful "keepings-off" tactics – were the only blips in the radar as Adelaide stormed to a 14–2 win–loss record, with eight of those wins by 50 points or more. At this stage their percentage of 172.38 was the best since West Coast in 1991. However, the Crows faded to lose four of their next five games, starting with an unexpected 82-point thumping by West Coast at Subiaco Oval. The sudden lapse was attributed in some part to injuries to several key players: Mark Ricciuto, Andrew McLeod, Ben Hart, Brett Burton and leading goalkicker Trent Hentschel; the last, after a breakout season, suffered a shocking knee injury against Port Adelaide in round 21 that would keep him out of the game for the next two seasons and curtail the rest of his career.

Adelaide did finish the home-and-away season on a positive note, winning their final game against Melbourne by 58 points and finishing the minor round in second place behind West Coast, with 16 wins and 6 losses. They thus entered the Second Qualifying Final at home against third-placed Fremantle, who had won their past nine games including a defeat of the Crows in Adelaide in round 19. There was to be no repeat however, as in blustery conditions with a strong breeze favouring Fremantle in the first quarter, Adelaide held the Dockers in check before running away with the game in the last quarter with the help of the wind, winning 10.16 (76) to 7.4 (46). Adelaide thus earned a week's rest before a Preliminary Final re-match against West Coast, this time to be played at AAMI Stadium. The Crows regained McLeod and Burton and started well, leading by 22 points at half-time, despite losing ruckman Rhett Biglands to a serious knee injury in the first quarter. However, a brilliant second-half performance by Ben Cousins saw West Coast come back to take the lead in the last quarter and hold on to win, 11.19 (85) to 11.9 (75), a bitter end to a year that had promised so much. For the second consecutive year, West Coast would face Sydney in a thrilling Grand Final: this time they won, by one point.

Simon Goodwin won his third Malcolm Blight Medal, and second in a row, while Tyson Edwards was runner-up. Goodwin, McLeod and Nathan Bassett were all named in the All-Australian team, while Ricciuto was the leading goalkicker with 44 goals. Again, Adelaide had no Rising Star nominees. Hart, who had become the Crows' first ever player to play 300 AFL games in round 2, was delisted at the end of the season. Draftees included Kurt Tippett at pick 32 in the national draft and David Mackay at pick 48.

==== 2007 season ====
The Crows showed patchy, inconsistent form throughout 2007, with previously successful coach Neil Craig criticised at times for his strict, inflexible game plan. The season had started with a shock home loss to Essendon, before Adelaide won six of their next eight games to sit in third place after round 9. This was followed by a steady slide, with just two wins in the next eight games causing Adelaide to fall to twelfth with five rounds remaining. An 8-point come-from-behind victory over eventual runners-up Port Adelaide proved the breakout; despite falling to dominant Geelong the next week, Adelaide then won their last three home-and-away matches, including a last-round win over top four contenders Collingwood at the Telstra Dome to secure eighth place and an away Elimination Final against Hawthorn, who they had defeated by 71 points during the season. In a high-scoring match, Adelaide led by 31 points in the second quarter but were reeled in by the Hawks and Lance Franklin. In a heartstopping finish, Franklin kicked his seventh goal from beyond 50 metres with only seconds left, giving Hawthorn victory, 15.15 (105) to 15.12 (102), and ending Adelaide's season.

Andrew McLeod won his third Malcolm Blight Medal in 2007, with Simon Goodwin finishing runner-up. McLeod was also Adelaide's only All-Australian representative, and was named captain. Scott Welsh was the Crows' leading goalscorer for the fourth time, kicking 49 for the season. The Crows had no Rising Star nominees, meaning they had had only one nomination since 2000 (Brent Reilly in 2004).

The off-season saw plenty of change to the Crows' squad. Captain Mark Ricciuto retired due to persistent injuries, with Goodwin succeeding him as skipper, while Welsh walked out on the club and was subsequently drafted by the Western Bulldogs in the pre-season draft. Jason Torney, Ian Perrie and Matthew Bode were among those delisted by the club. In the trade period, Martin Mattner was traded to Sydney for pick 28, which was on-traded to Port Adelaide for midfielder Brad Symes; John Meesen was traded to Melbourne for pick 37, later traded to North Melbourne for Brad Moran; and Ben Hudson went to the Bulldogs along with pick 43 for picks 30 and 38. Adelaide was successful in the 2007 national draft, drafting Patrick Dangerfield with pick 10, Andy Otten with pick 27 and New South Wales scholarship player Taylor Walker with their final pick, 75.

==== 2008 season ====
Adelaide started the 2008 season in promising form, and at the halfway mark they sat in fourth place on the table with an 8–3 win–loss record, led by a strong defensive unit of Ben Rutten, Nathan Bassett and Nathan Bock. However, a tiring midfield and injuries to key forwards Brett Burton and Jason Porplyzia resulted in a mid-season slide similar to the previous year, with the Crows falling out of the top eight after five consecutive losses. Again, though, Adelaide finished strongly with five wins in their last six home-and-away matches, including a shock round 22 victory over the third-placed Western Bulldogs which temporarily lifted the Crows into fourth position. A 108-point win by St Kilda over Essendon the next day saw the Saints overtake Adelaide on percentage; the Crows fell to fifth, costing them a double-chance and sending them into a sudden death Elimination Final against eighth-placed Collingwood at AAMI Stadium. This proved costly as, despite a six-goal performance from Scott Stevens, Collingwood dominated after half-time to win, 19.11 (125) to 14.10 (94).

Bock won the Malcolm Blight Medal in 2008 from Simon Goodwin, and was Adelaide's sole All-Australian representative at centre half back. Burton was Adelaide's leading goalkicker, with 34 goals in only 13 matches, and Kurt Tippett because Adelaide's first Rising Star nominee in four years with his four-goal performance against Melbourne in round 8. Nathan Bassett and Ken McGregor both retired at the end of the 2008 season, as well as Rhett Biglands who due to injury had not played since the 2006 Preliminary Final. Kris Massie was among those delisted by the club.

In the 2008 national draft, Adelaide drafted key position player Phil Davis with their first pick, number 10 overall. Other notable acquisitions included future club champion Rory Sloane at pick 44, and Ricky Henderson at pick 10 in the rookie draft.

==== 2009 season ====
After an indifferent start to the 2009 season, Adelaide hit form through the middle of the year, winning seven consecutive games between rounds 9 and 15. The catalyst was again their stingy defence, which held Melbourne (round 5) and Carlton (round 9) goalless to half-time, conceded just 3.6 (24) in their round 12 match against North Melbourne and restricted Fremantle to just 1.7 (13) in round 15 – the lowest score by a side in any VFL/AFL match since 1961. Losses to premiership contenders St Kilda, Geelong and Collingwood late in the season damaged Adelaide's top four hopes, and despite winning their last three matches they finished the season in fifth place for the second year running, with a 14–8 record.

Essendon visited AAMI Stadium in the first week of the finals for the First Elimination Final. After a close first quarter Adelaide dominated the match, winning 26.10 (166) to 10.10 (70) – their biggest ever finals win and third win in a row by more than 70 points. The win put the Crows into the first semi-final against Collingwood at the MCG. Adelaide continued their good form and led by 24 points at half-time before the Magpies responded to take the lead at three quarter time. In a thrilling final quarter, the lead changed several times before, for the second time in three years, Adelaide were sunk by a goal in the dying seconds: Jack Anthony converted a free kick from 40 metres on a slight angle, giving Collingwood a five-point win: 12.11 (83) to 11.12 (78).

Bernie Vince won the Malcolm Blight Medal in 2009 from leading goalkicker Jason Porplyzia. Sharpshooter Porplyzia kicked 57 goals for the season, with only 15 behinds. Simon Goodwin was named on a half back flank in the All Australian team. Young stars Patrick Dangerfield, Andy Otten and Taylor Walker were all nominated for the 2009 Rising Star award, with Otten finishing runner-up in the award to the Brisbane Lions' Daniel Rich. Veteran forward Brett Burton, who returned to the side late in the season having torn his ACL the previous year, took the Mark of the Year in round 22 against Carlton.

Adelaide drafted Daniel Talia (pick 13) and Jack Gunston (pick 29) with their first two selections in the national draft. They also picked up Matthew Wright (pick 33) and Matthew Jaensch (pick 46) in the rookie draft. Tagger Robert Shirley was delisted at the end of the season.

=== 2010s: Rebuilding, inconsistency and tragedy ===
==== 2010 season ====
Adelaide had a disastrous start to the 2010 season, losing their first six matches of the home and away season. This saw Adelaide second-last on the ladder only percentage above Richmond, and overtook their start of five losses in 2000 as the worst start to a season in the club's history. The sharp decline from their semi-final appearance in 2009 came due to a combination of poor form and injury troubles; no fewer than six players made their AFL debut in the first nine rounds of the season. Adelaide's form improved as the season wore on, and they won four successive games finishing with a round 16 win over reigning Premiers and league leaders Geelong. This would turn out to be the final career games of club stalwarts Andrew McLeod and Simon Goodwin. The Crows won just two of their last six games but continued their good form in pushing top four sides the Western Bulldogs and Collingwood to close margins and upsetting third-placed St Kilda in the final round. They finished 11th with nine wins and 13 losses, marking the first time under Neil Craig that the team did not make the finals.

The Malcolm Blight Medallist for 2010 was Richard Douglas, with Scott Thompson finishing runner-up. Kurt Tippett was Adelaide's leading goalscorer with 46 goals. No Crows made the All-Australian team, but Phil Davis was nominated for the Rising Star award. Besides McLeod and Goodwin, fellow stars Brett Burton, Tyson Edwards and Trent Hentschel all announced their retirements during the season, while Nathan Bock announced he was leaving the club to join new side Gold Coast.

In the trading period, Adelaide traded for maligned Richmond player Richard Tambling, giving up their compensation first-round pick for losing Bock and also pick 51, and for young Carlton ruckman Sam Jacobs, trading picks 34 and 67. They also traded Jonathon Griffin to Fremantle, receiving pick 61 in return. At the national draft, they selected Brodie Smith with their first pick, number 14 overall. Prior to the 2011 season, Nathan van Berlo was named Goodwin's successor as captain of Adelaide.

==== 2011 season ====
Without their retired stars, a young Adelaide side endured the worst season in their history in 2011. After upsetting a highly touted Hawthorn side in round 1 (in a re-match of the club's inaugural match 20 years earlier), the Crows lost 12 of their next 15 matches, including nine by margins of at least five goals. After a 103-point loss to fading champions St Kilda, the club's longest-serving coach Neil Craig stepped down, handing the reins to assistant coach and former premiership captain Mark Bickley as caretaker for the remainder of the season. Under Bickley the club won three of their next four games, but lost their final two to Richmond and West Coast, finishing in 14th place with 7 wins and 15 losses, both club worsts.

Scott Thompson won the Malcolm Blight Medal for 2011, with new skipper Nathan van Berlo finishing runner-up. Emerging forward Taylor Walker led the goalkicking with 32 goals in 13 games. No Crows were named in the All-Australian side or received Rising Star nominations in 2011. Scott Stevens retired during the season due to complications from multiple concussions, while Brad Moran also retired at the end of the season, and Phil Davis announced his defection to new club Greater Western Sydney.

Adelaide was active on the trade table in the 2011 off-season. Promising forward Jack Gunston requested a trade to Hawthorn, and got his wish via an exchange of draft picks: picks 53 and 71 also went to the Hawks, while Adelaide received picks 24, 46 and 64. Pick 24 was on-traded to Gold Coast for picks 27, 31 and 68; pick 31 was then on-traded to Essendon for rookie forward Josh Jenkins and pick 41, while pick 68 was traded along with pick 35 and Tony Armstrong for Sydney's Lewis Johnston. In other deals, Adelaide traded pick 10 and its first-round compensation pick for Davis to Greater Western Sydney for Luke Brown and pick 2 in the 17-year-old mini-draft, and also traded out ruckman Ivan Maric to Richmond for pick 37, which was on-traded to St Kilda for Tom Lynch.

With their mini-draft pick, Adelaide selected 17-year-old star Brad Crouch, who would not be eligible to play until 2013. Adelaide selected Sam Kerridge with their only top-40 pick in the national draft, pick 27, and drafted Rory Laird with pick 5 in the rookie draft.

Also in the off-season, the Adelaide board undertook a search for Craig's replacement as senior coach. Candidates for the role included Bickley, West Coast assistant coach Scott Burns and Geelong assistant Brenton Sanderson. Sanderson, a 200-game player and former best and fairest for Geelong who had played six games for the Crows at the start of his career, was hired for the role.

==== 2012 season ====
Under new coach Brenton Sanderson, Adelaide made an immediate impression the 2012 NAB Cup, defeating Carlton and Port Adelaide in a three-team lightning round-robin match and Brisbane Lions and Collingwood in full-length matches. They faced West Coast in the final at AAMI Stadium on 17 March, and won 2.10.17 (95) to 2.5.13 (61), with Bernie Vince winning the Michael Tuck Medal for best on ground. Adelaide continued their impressive form in the home-and-away season, performing consistently and never losing consecutive matches. They eventually finished second with 17 wins and 5 losses, equalling the club's best home-and-away record set in 2005 and only missing out on the minor premiership to Hawthorn by percentage.

The Crows hosted Sydney at AAMI Stadium in the Second Qualifying Final. Despite having more forward-50 entries Adelaide converted poorly and were comfortably beaten, 11.5 (71) to 5.12 (42). This sent them into a sudden-death Semi-final against Fremantle. Fremantle started well and led by 29 points early in the second quarter, but the Crows responded with Taylor Walker kicking five goals to seal a narrow win, 12.9 (81) to 11.5 (71). As a result, Adelaide faced minor premiers Hawthorn at the MCG in the First Preliminary Final. Hawthorn led for most of the match and despite Adelaide taking the lead with five minutes remaining, the Hawks responded to win the match by five points: 13.19 (97) to 14.8 (92). Hawthorn would go on to lose the grand final to Sydney by ten points the next week.

Scott Thompson won his second consecutive Malcolm Blight Medal in 2012, with fellow midfielder Patrick Dangerfield finishing runner-up. Thompson and Dangerfield both were named in the All-Australian team for that year, while Walker was the club's leading goalscorer for the second year running; his 63 goals were the most by a Crow since Tony Modra in 1997. Young key defender Daniel Talia became Adelaide's first ever Rising Star, having been nominated for his round 12 shutdown of St Kilda star Nick Riewoldt, while Sam Shaw was also nominated for the award.

At the end of the season Brad Symes was delisted and Chris Knights left as an unrestricted free agent to go to Richmond. During the trading period, Adelaide received ruckman Angus Graham from Richmond along with pick 54 in exchange for pick 42.

Also during the trading period, key forward Kurt Tippett requested a trade to Sydney, but this was denied when it emerged that Adelaide had offered money to Tippett outside of their salary cap (up to $200,000) and agreed to trade him to the club of his choice within his previous contract, signed at the end of 2009. As a result, the club was charged with eleven counts relating to salary cap regulation breaches and tampering with the draft. Prior to the AFL Commission hearing, Adelaide voluntarily forfeited their first two draft picks of the 2012 national draft, picks 20 and 54. At the hearing on 30 November 2014, the Crows were found guilty and fined $300,000, as well as losing their first and second round draft picks at the 2013 national draft. The Crows' CEO, Stephen Trigg, was fined $50,000 and banned from any club role for six months, while the general manager of football operations Phil Harper was suspended for two months and his predecessor John Reid was banned for 12 months. Tippett, who was drafted by Sydney in the pre-season draft with no compensation for Adelaide, was fined $50,000 and suspended for eleven matches. Tippett's own manager's accreditation was also revoked by the AFL Players' Association for a period of one year.

Without its first two draft picks, Adelaide's first pick in the 2012 draft was pick 62; they used this to select Sam Siggins, who ultimately did not play an AFL match in three years at the Crows. Kyle Hartigan was drafted with the club's first rookie draft pick, number 14.

==== 2013 season ====
The Crows suffered under the weight of expectations in an inconsistent 2013 season. Early in the season, key forward Taylor Walker injured his ACL, requiring a full reconstruction and a 12-month rehabilitation period. Walker's injury and Kurt Tippett's departure left the club without a proven key forward, and they struggled to regularly kick winning scores. Despite finishing the season promisingly with big victories over Melbourne and West Coast, Adelaide finished one win outside the top eight, in 11th place with ten wins and twelve losses. Their round 22 win over Melbourne was their final game at AAMI Stadium as the next year they would move to the remodelled, CBD-located Adelaide Oval.

During this year there was continual development of the Crows' young squad. Emerging midfielder Rory Sloane won the Malcolm Blight Medal from Richard Douglas, while Patrick Dangerfield was an All-Australian for the second year running. Tom Lynch led the club's goalscoring with 33 in 17 matches, including 10 goals in Adelaide's round 7 win over Greater Western Sydney; he became only the third player in Crows history to kick ten or more goals in a match. Sam Kerridge, Brad Crouch, Rory Laird and Luke Brown all received Rising Star nominations, the most Crows nominated in any season to date. Graham Johncock retired mid-season, while end-of-season delistings included Richard Tambling.

Having lost their first two draft picks due to the Tippett controversy the previous year, the Crows recruited aggressively over the off-season, securing veteran key forward James Podsiadly from Geelong in exchange for pick 64 and goalsneak Eddie Betts as a free agent from Carlton. The club also traded out former club champion Bernie Vince to Melbourne for pick 23 in the national draft. They used this pick to draft Matt Crouch, the younger brother of Brad, while Indigenous small forward Charlie Cameron was Adelaide's first rookie draft pick at 10.

==== 2014 season ====
The Crows sustained several injuries in the lead-up to the 2014 season. The most serious involved its captain, Nathan van Berlo, who ruptured his Achilles tendon during training. This sidelined him for the entire season, with Patrick Dangerfield and Rory Sloane acting as co-captains in his absence. Prior to the commencement of the regular season, strategy and innovation coach Dean Bailey died from lung cancer at the age of 47.

Adelaide lost their first three matches of the season, including heavy defeats to Port Adelaide and Sydney in their first two matches at Adelaide Oval. They won the next three, setting the tone for another inconsistent season. The move to Adelaide Oval paid dividends with a league-best average home crowd of 48,046, but performances on the field were poor as the club lost six out of twelve games at the venue. This ultimately proved costly as, for the second year running, the Crows narrowly missed the finals, this time finishing tenth with 11 wins and 11 losses.

Daniel Talia won the Malcolm Blight Medal in 2014 from Rory Sloane. Talia was also named at full-back in the All-Australian team, along with Brodie Smith on a half back flank. Eddie Betts led the goalscoring in his first year at Adelaide with a career-best 51 goals. Matt Crouch was nominated for the Rising Star award for his 28-possession effort against Greater Western Sydney in round 5. Long-time players Ben Rutten and Jason Porplyzia retired at the end of the 2014 season, with key defender Rutten kicking a goal – only the ninth of his career – with his final kick, in round 23 against St Kilda.

Adelaide did not take part in the 2014 trading period until the final minutes, when they obtained Kyle Cheney and Luke Lowden from Hawthorn amidst an exchange of draft picks (receiving 43, 47 and 59 in exchange for 31, 50 and 68). They then on-traded pick 47 along with their own pick 10 for Geelong's picks 14 and 35. In the draft they selected Jake Lever with their first pick at 14.

Shortly after the finish of the home-and-away season, on 17 September 2014, Brenton Sanderson was sacked as coach, with the club citing different perspectives on the team. Three weeks later, Port Adelaide assistant coach Phil Walsh was appointed as his replacement. On 14 January 2015, Taylor Walker was appointed the new captain of the Crows, replacing van Berlo ahead of widely tipped candidates Sloane and Dangerfield.

==== 2015 season ====
The 2015 season started successfully for the Adelaide Football Club with a 77-point win over reigning preliminary finalists North Melbourne. Adelaide won their first three games to sit top of the AFL ladder, before losing their next two setting up another inconsistent start to the season.

On 26 May 2015, the AFL launched an inquiry into Eddie Betts' signing with Adelaide after the 2013 season. This came after outgoing Carlton coach Mick Malthouse claimed to have been told by current Carlton and former Adelaide CEO Steven Trigg that Adelaide had illegally signed Betts 18 months prior to him departing Carlton. The club categorically denied the claim, as did Carlton and Betts' manager. Adelaide and Betts were subsequently cleared of any wrongdoing in the affair.

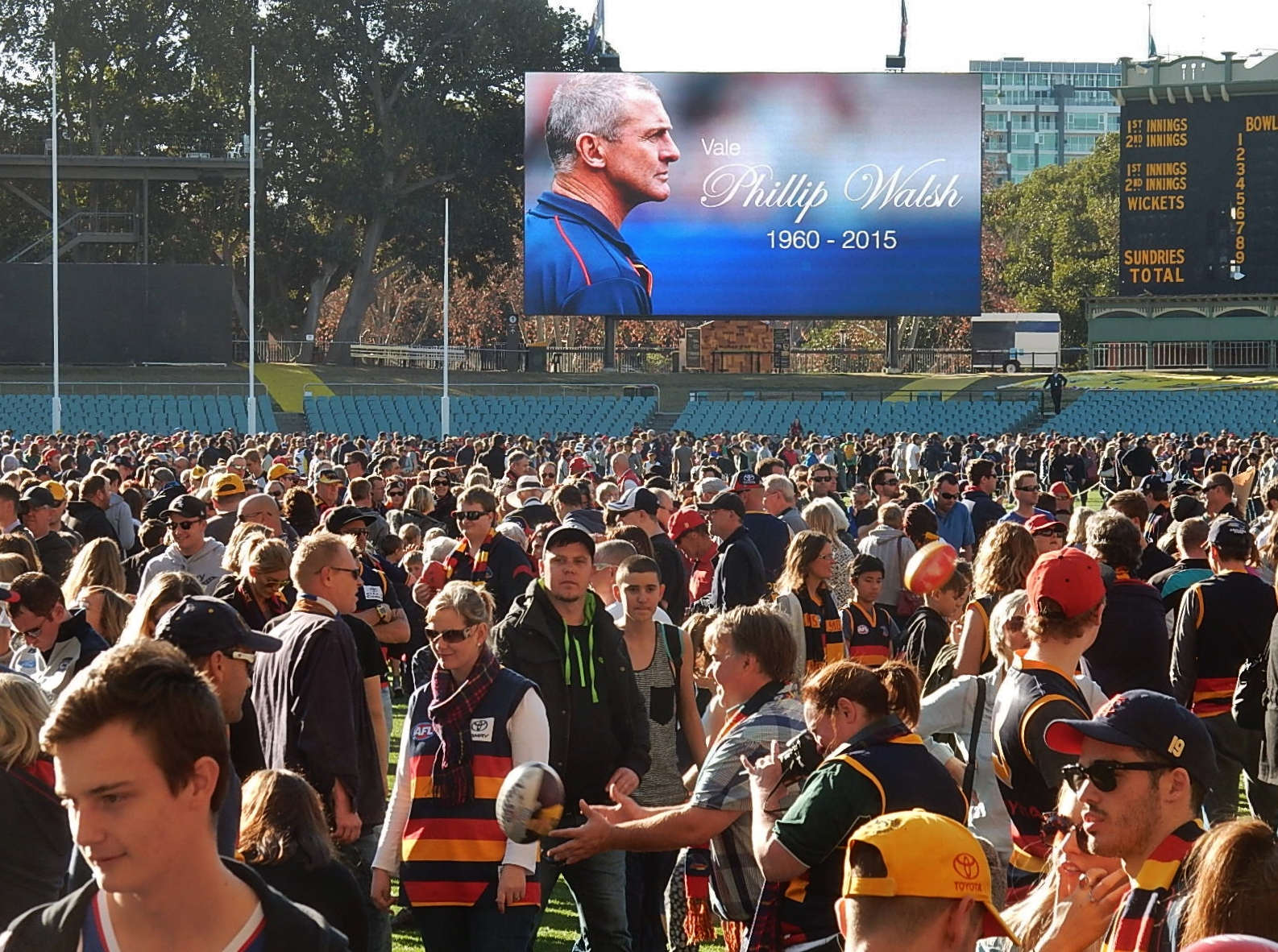
Fans gather at Adelaide Oval to pay tribute to Phil Walsh.

On 3 July, two days prior to Adelaide's then-scheduled round 14 match against Geelong, coach Phil Walsh was the victim of a domestic dispute and died from multiple stab wounds at the age of 55. The tragedy was followed by an outpouring of sympathy and tributes from the club's fans and the wider AFL community. The match against the Cats was cancelled, with both teams receiving two premiership points each. Adelaide's SANFL team's match against South Adelaide, scheduled for the next day, was postponed until later in the season. On 6 July, assistant coach Scott Camporeale was appointed interim coach for the remainder of the season, while West Coast premiership coach John Worsfold was hired as coaching director to support Camporeale.

The Crows returned to playing football in round 15 against West Coast at Domain Stadium, losing by 56 points. This loss saw Adelaide fall out of the top eight for the first time in the season, with a 7–6 win–loss record. However, the team rebounded to win six of their next seven games, culminating in a 57-point win over the Eagles in the return match, as they sealed their first finals appearance since 2012 with one round of the regular season to spare. Adelaide could have moved up to sixth place, hence earning a home elimination final, with a win over Geelong at Simonds Stadium, but they lost by 39 points, thus finishing 7th on the ladder with 13 wins, 8 losses and one abandoned game.

As per the AFL final eight system, the Crows faced the sixth-placed Western Bulldogs at the Melbourne Cricket Ground in the Second Elimination Final. The match, played on Saturday night, was a tight contest with neither side leading by more than 19 points at any stage, but a five-goal performance by Eddie Betts helped Adelaide to a 7-point win, 16.13 (109) to 14.18 (102). The victory earned Adelaide a Friday night Semi-final against reigning back-to-back premiers Hawthorn the following week at the same venue. Hawthorn dominated from start to finish to record a 21.9 (135) to 8.13 (61) victory; the 74-point margin was Adelaide's biggest ever loss in a final. The Hawks would go on to win their third consecutive premiership two weeks later.

Shortly after the conclusion of the season, star midfielder Patrick Dangerfield, a restricted free agent, announced his intention to return to Victoria, for family reasons. He finished his Adelaide career as a Malcolm Blight Medallist, winning the award from Rory Laird. Dangerfield (rover) and Eddie Betts (forward pocket) were both named in the All-Australian team; Betts led the club's goalkicking for the second straight year with 63, and kicked the AFL Goal of the Year against Fremantle in round 9 (fittingly, the AFL's Indigenous Round), kicking a left-foot torpedo punt from 50 metres out on the boundary line. Small forward Charlie Cameron and key defender Jake Lever were both nominated for the 2015 Rising Star award. Long-time Crow Brent Reilly retired mid-season, having suffered a career-ending and life-threatening fractured skull during pre-season training. James Podsiadly also retired, while Brodie Martin and Matthew Wright were notable delisted players.

Rather than allowing Dangerfield to leave as a free agent, Adelaide came to terms for a trade with his preferred club Geelong, trading Dangerfield and pick 50 for picks 9 and 26 and first-year player Dean Gore. Adelaide was an active player in the 2015 trade period besides the Dangerfield deal, obtaining Curtly Hampton (Greater Western Sydney) for a 2016 second-round pick, Paul Seedsman (Collingwood) for pick 32 and Troy Menzel (Carlton) for pick 28 and Sam Kerridge. In the draft Adelaide had two first round picks, ultimately picks 11 and 17 overall after the awarding of compensation picks and shifting due to academy selections. They used these picks to draft Wayne Milera and Tom Doedee respectively.

On 9 October Don Pyke, a former premiership player and assistant coach with West Coast who had also been an assistant coach at Adelaide from 2005 to 2006, was appointed Adelaide's senior coach for at least three years.

==== 2016 season ====
With the absence of Dangerfield, yet another new coach, a difficult draw and a perceived lack of squad depth, Adelaide was widely tipped to slide out of the finals in 2016. However, the Crows began the season well, navigating a run of difficult games to sit in seventh place at the bye with 8 wins and 4 losses. Their success was built largely on moving the ball quickly to create opportunities for their dangerous forward line: at that stage they were the highest-scoring team in the AFL and forward-line trio Taylor Walker, Eddie Betts and Josh Jenkins had kicked 99 goals between them and were all in the top 10 goalkickers in the AFL.

Entering the final round of the regular season, the Crows had the chance to secure a top-two finish, which would have guaranteed them two home finals. With eventual Malcolm Blight Medallist Rory Sloane receiving a suspension, Adelaide suffered a costly 29-point loss to the West Coast Eagles at home; this defeat dropped them to fifth on the ladder. As per the mechanisms of the finals system, the club then hosted North Melbourne in its home elimination final, winning by 62 points, before having their season ended by the Sydney Swans at the Sydney Cricket Ground by 36 points in the semi-final the week after.

==== 2017 season ====
2017 AFL Home & Away Season	W	L	D	Total	%
Adelaide	15	6	1	62	136.0
	Minor Premiers

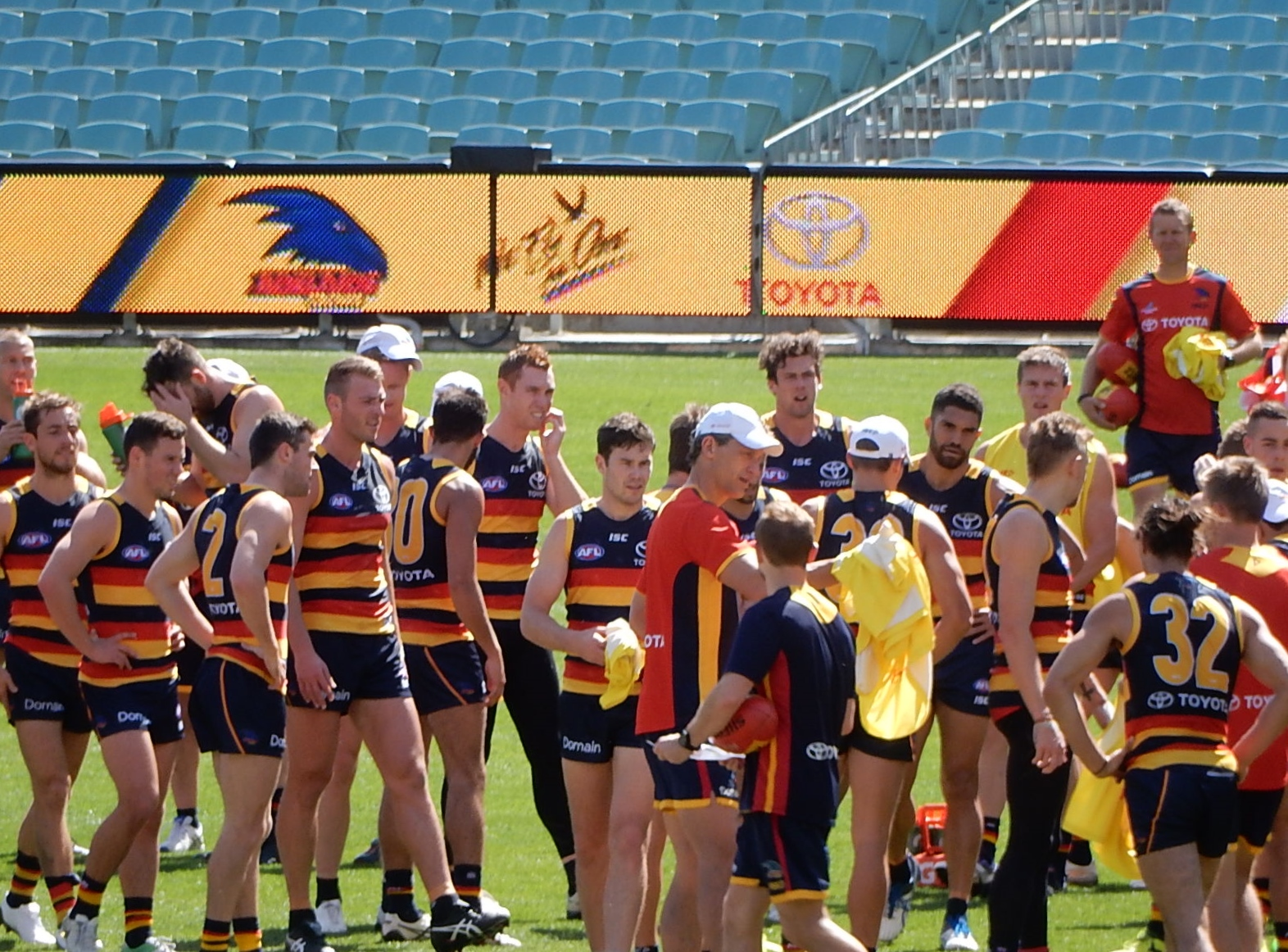
Players training before the 2017 AFL Grand Final

2017 began with six wins in a row, including a Showdown win, and the defeat of eventual premiers Richmond was one of three games in a row with 10-plus goal wins. A negative form reversal came when the Crows lost by 59 points to North Melbourne at Bellerive Oval, but they remained first on the ladder. Round 19 saw Adelaide's second-ever draw. A miraculous comeback from a 50-point deficit completed by a Mitch McGovern set shot after the siren secured a score of 103 points apiece against Collingwood. Finishing first on the ladder in 19 of the season's 23 rounds ensured the club's second McClelland Trophy.

A pre-finals injury to McGovern and an ACL injury to backman Brodie Smith during the qualifying final against Greater Western Sydney took a hit on Adelaide's squad. The club's winning preliminary final against Geelong remains the largest crowd at the redeveloped Adelaide Oval for a sporting event as of 2024. Two finals wins qualified Adelaide for their first Grand Final in nearly two decades. However, the Crows’ excellent season came undone at the finish as they suffered a demoralising 48-point defeat to Richmond in the grand final to finish runner-up. Young gun Matt Crouch won the Malcolm Blight Medal in his breakout year. Carlton midfielder Bryce Gibbs finally secured a trade home to South Australia along with North Melbourne veteran Sam Gibson.

Future All-Australians Charlie Cameron and Jake Lever departed the club through trades. Captain Taylor Walker criticised Lever in the media, accusing the defender of "choosing money over success". In an ironic twist of fate, Lever would go on to become a premiership player with Melbourne as the Crows dropped to the bottom of the ladder in 2021.

==== 2018 season ====
Adelaide were hoping to atone for their disappointing Grand Final performance in 2018, but a number of factors, such as player departures, injuries and a highly controversial preseason camp conspired to ruin the Crows’ season. They would miss the finals altogether despite a comeback victory against eventual premiers West Coast, ultimately finishing 12th on the ladder with 12 wins and 10 losses.

==== 2019 season ====
After a disappointing 2018, Adelaide regrouped and were expected to return to premiership favouritism in 2019. Despite a decent first half of the season, which saw them poised to return to the finals after an 8–5 win–loss record at the end of round 14, the Crows collapsed and won just twice in the last nine rounds of the year to miss the top eight once again, finishing 11th with a record of 10 wins and 12 losses. The poor finish to the season triggered a review of the club's operations, as well as the resignation of senior coach Don Pyke. Taylor Walker stepped down as co-captain of the club, leaving Rory Sloane as the club's sole captain for the following season.

A mass exodus of players followed Pyke, with key players such as Eddie Betts, Hugh Greenwood, Alex Keath, Josh Jenkins, Sam Jacobs and more landing at new clubs in the off-season.

=== 2020s: Rock-bottom and ladder-climbing ===
==== 2020 season ====
Former Port Adelaide and Greater Western Sydney assistant coach Matthew Nicks was appointed as Adelaide's new senior coach for the 2020 season. 2020 would be an all-time low for the Crows, winning just three matches and losing 14 in the shortened season to earn their maiden wooden spoon. The season would end surprisingly strong, however, as the Crows scored three consecutive victories in their final four matches.

Some reward for Adelaide's misery came in the 2020 national draft. Going into the night, the Crows had the number one pick of the draft, having finished last on the AFL ladder. However, as the Western Bulldogs matched Adelaide's bid on young forward Jamarra Ugle-Hagan, Adelaide turned to West Adelaide product Riley Thilthorpe as the second overall pick, their highest ever in the national draft.

==== 2021 season ====
The Crows won their first game of the 2021 AFL season, beating the reigning Grand Finalists Geelong in an upset victory. The Crows improved slightly over their disastrous 2020 campaign, losing only one of their first four games. Walker was banned from the AFL for six games between the 2021 and 2022 AFL seasons due to racist comments directed towards Robbie Young of North Adelaide during a SANFL match.

After requesting a move home to South Australia and subsequently nominating the Crows, high-value Sydney wingman Jordan Dawson was traded to Adelaide in the 2021 trade period. The trade would prove influential in Adelaide's rise out of the bottom four in 2022. Adelaide also drafted future rising stars Josh Rachele and Jake Soligo in the 2021 national draft.

==== 2022 season ====
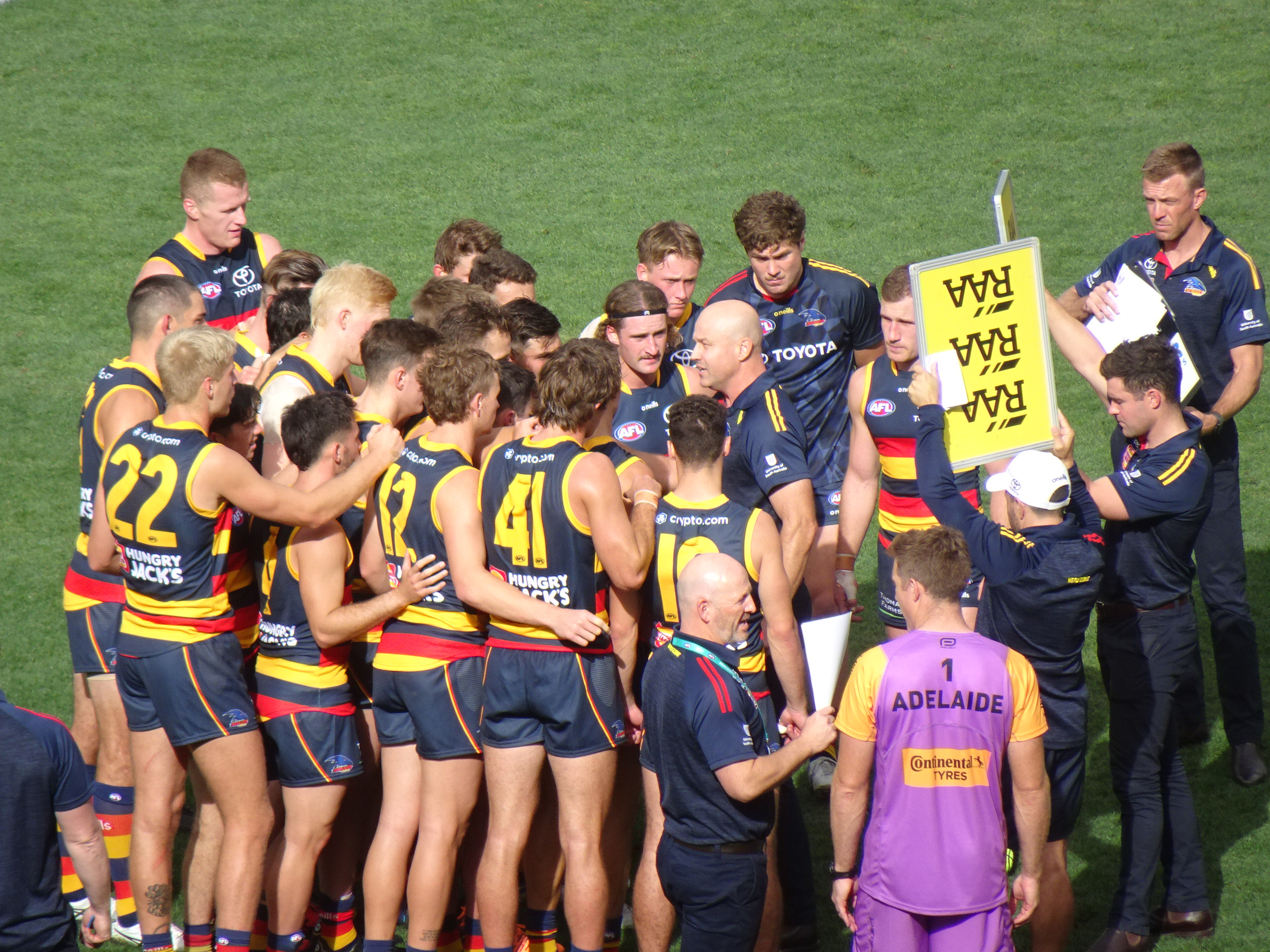
Coach Matthew Nicks addressing the team during a break in a 2022 match.

The Crows hosted the first-ever Friday night Showdown in Round 3, and claimed one of their best-ever wins via an after-the-siren bending kick from the recruit Dawson, who received best-on-ground honours. Captain Rory Sloane ruptured his ACL in round 5. In his absence, the role of captain rotated between Reilly O'Brien, Ben Keays, Brodie Smith, and Tom Doedee for the remainder of the season. Adelaide traded in Izak Rankine at a high price, leaving them no first-round draft picks in the 2022 AFL draft until they matched the bid for Max Michalanney, son of Jim as the club's first father–son pick at a national draft. Rory Laird equalled three other club greats by winning his third Malcolm Blight Medal.

==== 2023 season ====
The Crows headlined the first-ever Gather Round, as they had a return to form, defeating multiple top-eight teams. Some controversial finishes, including one in round 23 against Sydney, when a Ben Keays goal was mistakenly disallowed, cost the Crows their first AFL finals series in seven years. Adelaide finished 2023 in 10th on the ladder, their best position since 2017, in part due to the leadership of their new captain Jordan Dawson, who won his first Malcolm Blight Medal. Vice-captain Tom Doedee departed the club via a free agency move to Brisbane in what was a quiet player movement period for the Crows. Dawson and Taylor Walker became Adelaide's first All-Australian players since 2018 as Walker finished second in the Coleman Medal.

During the 2023 national draft, Adelaide made a live pick-swap with Greater Western Sydney to ensure that they could draft West Australian Dan Curtin with their first-round pick. Lacking key position depth, the Crows hoped that the young swingman could assist with the departure of Doedee.

==== 2024 season ====
Despite high expectations, 2024 was another disappointing year for the club, with a lack of on-field performance resulting in questions being raised around Nicks' coaching, particularly amid the choice to drop young forward Josh Rachele following a bitter Showdown loss. Famous away wins against Carlton and Essendon highlighted the season, while the Crows' clash with eventual premiers Brisbane resulted in their first-ever draw at home. Izak Rankine contended for his first All-Australian selection until he was on both sides of dangerous clashes, resulting in a long period of time away from football.

An eventful trade period brought in Alex Neal-Bullen, who became Adelaide's first premiership player since James Podsiadly more than ten years prior. Giants Isaac Cumming and James Peatling also joined the club to replace the retiring Rory Sloane. In another club first, there was a draw in Adelaide's best and fairest award. Captain Dawson and formerly delisted Lion Ben Keays shared the honour. Key forward Darcy Fogarty ended Taylor Walker's five-year run of leading goalkicker awards. One of the most promising South Australian products in recent years Sid Draper landed at Adelaide with the fourth overall pick in the 2024 national draft.

==== 2025 season ====
2025 AFL Home & Away Season	W	L	D	Total	%
Adelaide	18	5	0	72	139.3
	Minor Premiers

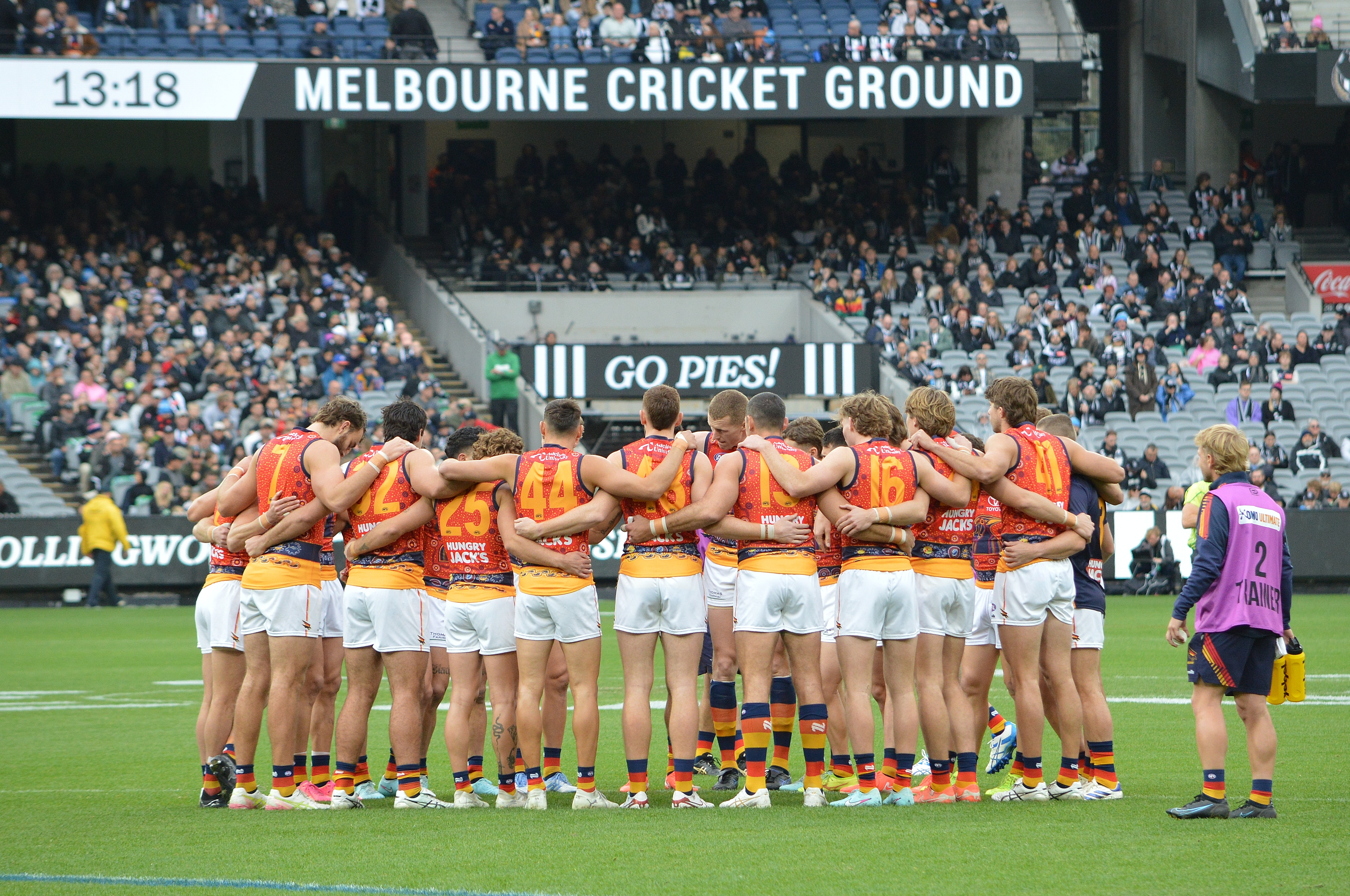
Adelaide players huddle before a 2025 match against Collingwood

In November 2024, Adelaide unveiled their new logo for the 2025 season. It features a swooping crow, reminiscent of the badge used by the club until 2010. Senior men's and women's teams adopted this logo. For the first time, the club's SANFL team will use the same logo as the senior sides. Slightly altered tri-colours also feature.

With their round 13 victory over Brisbane Lions, Adelaide improved on their 8-1-14 record from 2024. The Crows would go on to claim their first finals appearance and first minor premiership since 2017, officially securing first place following the round 24 win over North Melbourne. However, Adelaide would go on to lose both of their finals, becoming the first minor premiers in 42 years to exit the finals series in straight sets. Veteran forward Taylor Walker played his 300th game in the qualifying final against Collingwood, while former All-Australians Matt Crouch and Brodie Smith retired after 164 and 273 games respectively.

Captain Jordan Dawson had a historic individual year, setting the club record for the most Brownlow Medal votes in a season, becoming an All-Australian vice-captain, and winning the AFLPA best captain. He also set a record by winning his third consecutive Malcolm Blight Medal and drawing equal with four other players for the most wins in the award's history.

==== 2026 season ====
The beginning of the 2026 season was a wake-up call for the club, who won just one of its first four games – a streak-breaking win over Collingwood at the MCG – and losing the other three by a combined 16 points, coinciding with the trend of close losses under coach Nicks. Another trend emerged, in which the Crows were unable to start games on their terms and needing to comeback in the second half of matches. Even in a narrow win against St Kilda, Adelaide found themselves as much as 26 points down early in that match. The passing of captain Jordan Dawson's brother during this period sent shockwaves throughout the AFL community and may have impacted on-field performance. In Dawson's return game, he was Adelaide's best with 28 disposals and 2 goals, but Adelaide lost to reigning premiers Brisbane Lions by 52 points – their second-largest losing margin since 2022.

As the bye round arrived, Adelaide were being described as very "middle of the pack", losing to good teams, such as another narrow loss to Hawthorn in round 11, and beating bad teams, including a 10-goal quarter in the win over North Melbourne in round 10. Adelaide's form was epitomised with the form of Riley Thilthorpe, who, following his All-Australian year in 2025, kicked more than one goal in only three of his first ten games of the season while carrying a back injury.

Adelaide's form improved vastly after the bye when they beat Geelong for the first time since 2021. They also smashed the Western Bulldogs and Gold Coast, with a Showdown loss the only blemish on their form. The Crows won their away fixture to second-placed Sydney, in what was described as Matthew Nicks' greatest win as coach as his team continued to push for a top-four position. The win was soured with a three-game suspension of the best-on-ground Darcy Fogarty.

Adelaide finished the season sixth on the ladder, avoiding the inaugural wildcard finals to set up a home elimination final against the Western Bulldogs. The Crows came away 22-point victors in what would be Taylor Walker's last game at Adelaide Oval, setting up a semi-final against the reigning premiers Brisbane and purging a nine-year finals win drought.

== See also ==
- Adelaide Football Club
