= 2003 Wizard Home Loans Cup =

- Season: 2003
- Teams: 16
- Winners: Adelaide (1st title)
- Matches played: 15
- Attendance: 265,976 (average 17,732 per match)
- Michael Tuck Medallist: Andrew McLeod (Adelaide)

The 2003 Wizard Home Loans Cup was the Australian Football League competition played in its entirety before the Australian Football League's 2003 Premiership Season began. The AFL National Cup is also sometimes referred to as the pre-season cup because it is played in its entirety before the Premiership Season begins. The final was won by Adelaide for the first time in its history, defeating Collingwood by 31 points

The AFL introduced a range of innovations for this pre-season competition, the Wizard Home Loans Cup, to make the game faster and more exciting. Five new rules changes were trialled in the competition, which in itself resorts back to a knock-out format after three years as a round-robin series. In the most notable innovation, players were awarded nine points for goals kicked outside the 50-metre arc in a move designed to bring the game’s longer kickers into play. The player must have his back foot on or beyond the 50m arc if kicking on the run and the player on the mark must be on or beyond the 50m arc if the kicker is taking a set shot. The ball can still bounce through for a goal. With a running shot at goal, the ball must leave the player’s back foot planted on or outside the 50m line.

The other rules trialled included:

- teams will concede three points for rushed behinds instead of one point.
- umpires calling play-on, and not awarding a mark, for players kicking backwards to team-mates outside the attacking 50m arc,
- the centre square will be expanded from 45 metres to 50 metres,
- defenders will also be able to kick out after a behind straight away, rather than wait for the goal umpire to wave his flags, in a move designed to speed up the game.

In other changes, the field umpires wore orange shirts and black shorts instead of the traditional white, while goal umpires waved different coloured flags for the different scores. The new rules were used in conjunction with those incorporated last year: an expanded interchange bench, and the ball to be bounced only for the start of the match, and then thrown up.

== Games ==
=== Week 1 ===
	Week 1
Friday, 21 February (7:40pm)	Richmond 1.8.0.5 (62)	def. by	Melbourne 2.12.0.15 (105)	Telstra Dome (crowd: 16,990)
Friday, 21 February (7:10pm)	West Coast 1.13.0.13 (100)	def.	Fremantle 1.11.1.5 (83)	Subiaco Oval (crowd: 32,701)
Saturday, 22 February (2:40pm)	Essendon 0.8.0.9 (57)	def. by	Kangaroos 1.15.1.17 (119)	Manuka Oval (crowd: 8,041)
Saturday, 22 February (2:40pm)	Hawthorn 0.11.1.13 (82)	def.	St Kilda 1.7.0.8 (59)	York Park (crowd: 11,427)
Saturday, 22 February (7:40pm)	Brisbane Lions 0.14.1.6 (93)	def.	Sydney 0.9.0.7 (61)	Telstra Stadium (crowd: 8,276)
Saturday, 22 February (7:40pm)	Adelaide 1.10.0.9 (78)	def.	Port Adelaide 0.11.0.11 (77)	AAMI Stadium (crowd: 25,560)
Sunday, 23 February (2:40pm)	Western Bulldogs 4.7.0.9 (87)	def. by	Geelong 2.19.0.14 (146)	Skilled Stadium (crowd: 8,406)
Sunday, 23 February (6:10pm)	Carlton 0.14.0.8 (92)	def. by	Collingwood 4.16.1.13 (148)	Telstra Dome (crowd: 20,893)

=== Week 2 ===
	Week 2
Friday, 28 February (7:10pm)	West Coast 1.10.0.11 (80)	def. by	Adelaide 0.17.0.4 (106)	Marrara Oval (crowd: 9,404)
Saturday, 1 March (7:40pm)	Kangaroos 1.10.0.9 (78)	def.	Melbourne 1.8.0.8 (65)	Telstra Dome (crowd: 10,311)
Saturday, 1 March (7:40pm)	Geelong 2.9.0.7 (79)	def.	Brisbane Lions 1.9.0.8 (71)	Bundaberg Rum Stadium (crowd: 8,150)
Sunday, 2 March (6:10pm)	Collingwood 1.15.0.13 (112)	def.	Hawthorn 1.9.1.6 (72)	Telstra Dome (crowd: 19,556)

=== Semi finals ===
	Semi finals
Saturday, 8 March (6:10pm)	Collingwood 5.8.0.10 (103)	def.	Geelong 1.8.0.9 (66)	Telstra Dome (crowd: 24,728)
Saturday, 8 March (8:10pm)	Adelaide 1.9.0.10 (73)	def.	Kangaroos 0.10.0.9 (69)	AAMI Stadium (crowd: 17,962)

== Grand final ==
Grand Final
Saturday, 15 March, 7:45 PM	Adelaide	def.	Collingwood	Telstra Dome (crowd: 43,571)
0.4.0.1 (25); 1.8.0.3 (60); 1.9.0.4 (67); 2.13.0.8 (104)	Q1; Q2; Q3; Final	0.3.0.2 (20); 0.4.0.4 (28); 0.6.0.7 (43); 1.9.1.7 (73)	Umpires: Brett Allen, Darren Morris, Scott McLaren, Stephen McBurney; Michael Tuck Medal: Andrew McLeod (Adelaide); Television broadcast: Nine Network
Andrew McLeod, Rhett Biglands	Super Goals	Scott Burns
Ian Perrie 3, Mark Stevens 2, Rhett Biglands 2, Wayne Carey 2, Tyson Edwards, Chris Ladhams, Andrew McLeod, Graham Johncock	Goals	Alan Didak 2, Chris Tarrant 2, Jarrod Molloy, Rupert Betheras, Andrew Williams, Ryan Lonie, Shane Woewodin
Matthew Bode, Andrew McLeod, Matthew Clarke, Simon Goodwin, Brett Burton, Tyson Edwards, Mark Stevens	Best	Rhyce Shaw, Tarkyn Lockyer, Andrew Williams, Nathan Buckley
Nil	Injuries	Nil
Nil	Reports	Chris Tarrant (Col) for unduly rough play (charging) against Brent Reilly (Ade) in the third quarter. The charge against Tarrant was withdrawn by the AFL on the following Monday

== Exhibition Matches ==
	Indigenous All Stars
Saturday, 8 February (7:30pm)	ATSIC Chairman’s All Stars 19.16 (130)	def.	Carlton 8.9 (57)	Marrara Stadium (crowd: 17,500)	Report

	Practice Match
Sunday, 16 February (4:00pm)	Sydney 19.13 (127)	def.	Essendon 19.5 (119)	North Sydney Oval (crowd: 7,328)	Report

== Wizard Regional Challenge Series ==
	Week 1
Saturday, 1 March (1:30pm)	Sydney 5.9 (39)	def. by	Carlton 12.7 (79)	Coffs Harbour International Stadium (crowd: 2,537)
Saturday, 1 March (1:30pm)	Port Adelaide 10.9 (69)	def. by	Western Bulldogs 15.14 (104)	Centennial Park Oval, Nuriootpa (crowd: 5,129)
Saturday, 1 March (2:30pm)	St Kilda 11.9 (75)	def. by	Essendon 8.13 (61)	Optus Oval (crowd: 3,000 est.)
Saturday, 1 March (3:30pm)	Fremantle 13.11 (89)	def.	Richmond 6. 5 (41)	Wonthella Oval, Geraldton (crowd: 7,327)

	Week 2
Friday, 7 March (7:00pm)	Brisbane Lions 16.8 (104)	def.	St Kilda 11.6 (72)	Giffin Park, Coorparoo (crowd: 4,000)
Saturday, 8 March (1:00pm)	Sydney 14.7 (91)	def.	Melbourne 8.8 (56)	Manuka Oval (crowd: 2,324)
Saturday, 8 March (2:00pm)	Carlton 13.14 (92)	def. by	Richmond 20.5 (125)	Optus Oval (crowd: 4,598)
Saturday, 8 March (2:00pm)	Essendon 20.13 (133)	def.	Western Bulldogs 9.8 (62)	Queen Elizabeth Oval, Bendigo (crowd: 8,539)
Saturday, 8 March (4:00pm)	West Coast 5.4 (34)	def. by	Hawthorn 14.5 (89)	Subiaco Oval (crowd: 8,000)
Saturday, 8 March (7:00pm)	Fremantle 18.9 (117)	def.	Port Adelaide 10.8 (68)	Subiaco Oval (crowd: 10,930)

	Week 3
Friday, 14 March (4:00pm)	Melbourne 6.9 (45)	def. by	West Coast 7.14 (56)	Optus Oval (crowd: 500 est.)
Friday, 14 March (7:00pm)	Essendon 11.13 (79)	def. by	Geelong 12.12 (84)	Lavington Oval, Albury (crowd: 12,204)
Friday, 14 March (7:00pm)	Port Adelaide 13.14 (92)	def. by	Carlton 14.15 (99)	AAMI Stadium (crowd: 5,603)
Saturday, 15 March (1:00pm)	Sydney 15.13 (103)	def.	Richmond 8.14 (62)	SCG (crowd: 2,057)
Saturday, 15 March (2:00pm)	Western Bulldogs 12.14 (86)	def.	Brisbane Lions 9.14 (68)	Whitten Oval (crowd: 5,000 est.)
Saturday, 15 March (2:00pm)	St Kilda 5.7 (37)	def. by	Kangaroos 20.7 (127)	Northern Oval, North Ballarat (crowd: 5,000 est.)
Saturday, 15 March (4:00pm)	Hawthorn 10.9 (69)	def. by	Fremantle 10.11 (71)	Optus Oval (crowd: 2,500 est.)

== See also ==
- List of Australian Football League night premiers
- 2003 AFL season
