= Brent Williams =

Brent Williams may refer to:

- Brent Williams (American football) (born 1964), NFL footballer of the 1980s and 1990s
- Brent Williams (Australian footballer) (born 1978), Australian rules footballer for Adelaide
- Brent Langdon Williams (born 1972), American basketball coach
