= Nathan Bassett =

Australian rules footballer (born 1976)

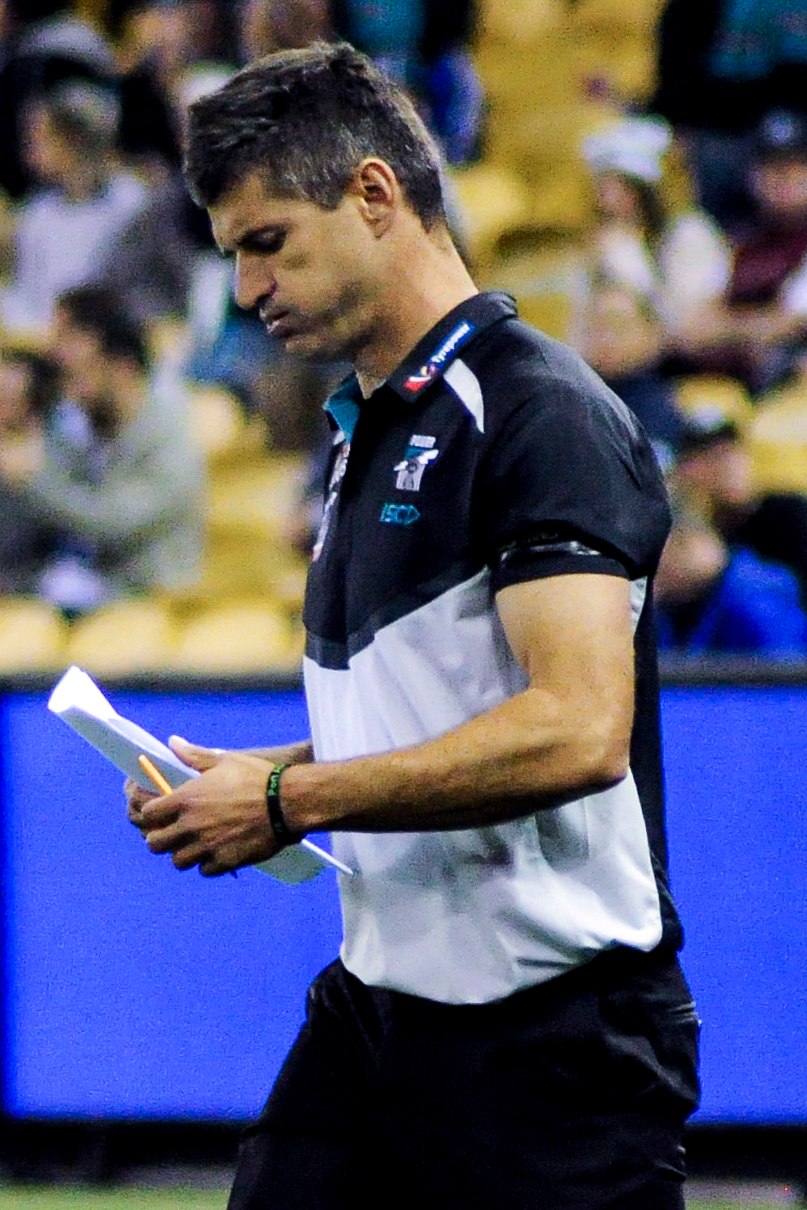
- Bassett coaching in April 2018.

Personal information
- Nicknames: The Hound, Bassy, Bruce, Fred Basset, Bassball
- Born: 7 December 1976 (age 49); Adelaide, South Australia
- Original team: Norwood (SANFL)
- Draft: No. 3, 1996 Rookie Draft
- Height: 190 cm (6 ft 3 in)
- Weight: 88 kg (194 lb)
- Position: Defender

Playing career^{1}
Years	Club	Games (Goals)
1997	Melbourne	0 (0)
1998–2008	Adelaide	210 (25)

Coaching career^{3}
Years	Club	Games (W–L–D)
2010–2013	Norwood	91 (68–23–0) 74.7%
2026–	West Adelaide	3 (1–1–1) 33.3%
Total		94 (69–24–1) 73.4%
- ^{1} Playing statistics correct to the end of 2013.^{3} Coaching statistics correct as of round 3, 2026.

Career highlights
- All-Australian team: 2006; 2× SANFL premiership coach: 2012, 2013

Nathan "Bassy" Bassett (born 7 December 1976) is a former Australian rules footballer for the Adelaide Football Club in the Australian Football League (AFL).

== Career ==
Bassett made his SANFL debut for Norwood in 1994, he finished sixth in the club best and fairest as a 19-year-old and was drafted at pick 3 by Melbourne Football Club in the inaugural AFL rookie draft.

=== Melbourne ===
Drafted with the third selection in the first AFL Rookie Draft by Melbourne in 1997, Bassett was elevated to the senior list after Round 4 in 1997 to replace Craig Turley but suffered a fractured sternum in the next Reserves game and was unable to make his AFL debut for the Demons. When he made his return to the reserves he played six more games at full forward but didn't see much of the ball and wasn't suited to the role. At the end of the season he was traded to Adelaide for Matthew Collins and Brent Williams.

=== Adelaide ===
Bassett impressed in the pre season and made his debut at 21 for the Crows in round 1 1998, showing promise in defence. He was hardly beaten in his debut season, finishing tenth in the Best and Fairest despite only playing 13 games and missing out on finals.

He played 210 games for Adelaide and topped off a great 2005 season by being named Best Team Man and coming runner up in the club's Best and Fairest award.

In 2006, Bassett was named in the 2006 All-Australian team, along with his teammates Andrew McLeod and Simon Goodwin.

== Statistics ==
Statistics correct to the end of the 2008 season

Legend
G	Goals	K	Kicks	D	Disposals	T	Tackles
B	Behinds	H	Handballs	M	Marks

Season	Team	No.	Games	Totals							Averages (per game)						
Season	Team	No.	Games	G	B	K	H	D	M	T	G	B	K	H	D	M	T
1998	Adelaide	8	13	1	0	90	33	123	34	19	0.1	0.0	6.9	2.5	9.5	2.6	1.5
1999	Adelaide	8	21	1	0	154	60	214	69	10	0.0	0.0	7.3	2.9	10.2	3.3	0.5
2000	Adelaide	8	18	4	4	159	62	221	79	26	0.2	0.2	8.8	3.4	12.3	4.4	1.4
2001	Adelaide	8	13	0	0	93	58	151	44	7	0.0	0.0	7.2	4.5	11.6	3.4	0.5
2002	Adelaide	8	20	9	3	136	73	209	52	30	0.5	0.2	6.8	3.7	10.5	2.6	1.5
2003	Adelaide	8	21	3	1	135	117	252	80	25	0.1	0.0	6.4	5.6	12.0	3.8	1.2
2004	Adelaide	8	21	1	0	133	96	229	82	27	0.0	0.0	6.3	4.6	10.9	3.9	1.3
2005	Adelaide	8	25	2	2	200	176	376	120	45	0.1	0.1	8.0	7.0	15.0	4.8	1.8
2006	Adelaide	8	22	2	0	248	149	397	172	41	0.1	0.0	11.3	6.8	18.0	7.8	1.9
2007	Adelaide	8	13	1	0	132	69	201	93	26	0.1	0.0	10.2	5.3	15.5	7.2	2.0
2008	Adelaide	8	23	1	0	188	179	367	127	39	0.0	0.0	8.2	7.8	16.0	5.5	1.7
Career			210	25	10	1668	1072	2740	952	295	0.1	0.0	7.9	5.1	13.0	4.5	1.4

== Coaching ==
Bassett was the senior coach of the Norwood Football Club which plays in the South Australian National Football League (SANFL). He coached them to the Grand Final in his first season in 2010, where they were runners up. He then led the Redlegs to their 28th SANFL premiership with a 12.7 (79) to 3.12 (30) win over West Adelaide in the 2012 Grand Final at AAMI Stadium. Back-to-back premiership success came in 2013 over North Adelaide. At the last match ever played at AAMI Stadium, in front of almost 37,000 fans, Norwood defeated North Adelaide 10.12 (72) to 4.8 (32).

On 17 October 2013, Bassett was confirmed as an assistant coach to Mark Thompson at Essendon. The move reunited Bassett with former Adelaide coach Neil Craig, who Bassett played under from 2004 to 2008. He remained an assistant at Essendon until the end of 2015.

On 18 September 2015, Bassett was announced as an assistant coach at the Port Adelaide Football Club. He later became an assistant coach at Melbourne.

In 2026, Bassett was appointed as the head coach of SANFL club West Adelaide, who had won seven of the previous ten wooden spoons.

== Personal life ==
Some of Bassett's nicknames include The Hound, Bassy, Bruce and Fred Basset – after the comic strip which appears in many Australian newspapers.

He was diagnosed with type 1 diabetes in 1997.
