= Ben Hart (Australian footballer) =

Australian rules footballer (born 1974)

Personal information
- Full name: Benjamin Hart
- Born: 9 July 1974 (age 52)
- Original team: North Adelaide (SANFL)
- Debut: Round 1, 1992, Adelaide vs. Footscray, at Football Park
- Height: 188 cm (6 ft 2 in)
- Weight: 85 kg (187 lb)
- Position: Defender

Playing career^{1}
Years	Club	Games (Goals)
1992–2006	Adelaide	311 (45)

Representative team honours
Years	Team	Games (Goals)
1993–1999	South Australia	

International team honours
1998–1999	Australia	
- ^{1} Playing statistics correct to the end of 2006.

Career highlights
- Club: 2× AFL Premiership player (1997, 1998); 4× All-Australian team: 1992-1993, 1999, 2002; 2× Malcolm Blight Medal 1999, 2002; AFL Mark of the Year 1996; Adelaide Team of the Decade - Back pocket; Australian Football Hall of Fame (inducted 2016); Representative: Australian National Football Carnival Championship: 1993

Benjamin Hart (born 9 July 1974) is a former professional Australian rules footballer who played for the Adelaide Football Club in the Australian Football League. He was an assistant coach with the Collingwood Football Club from 2012 to 2016.

== Early career ==
Ben Hart made his debut in the SANFL for North Adelaide in a semi final in 1990 at 16 years of age, he went on to combine his college commitments with those of the North Adelaide Roosters until he was selected by the Crows in 1992.

Hart was wearing his Rostrevor College uniform when the 16-year-old Year 12 student was first introduced to the media in 1991. A year later, in 1992, Hart made his debut in the Adelaide Crows side direct from the 1st XVIII Rostrevor College team, he became the youngest ever Crow on AFL debut (17 years, 256 days). Hart made an immediate impact as a defender, playing all 22 games (and booting 3 goals). The then 18-year-old Hart won All-Australian selection that year and repeated that feat in 1993.

== Records ==
In early 2005, Hart passed the Adelaide games record, overtaking Nigel Smart with 279 games. In early 2006 Hart reached another milestone, by becoming the first Adelaide Crows player to join the exclusive 300 games club. Hart had been in superb form early in 2006 but suffered his first major injury, a broken arm vs Richmond in Round 8 of 2006, making his return in Round 16. He was again injured in Round 21, ending his season and his career.

== Retirement ==
At the end of the 2006 season, Hart was delisted by the Crows due to the long-term injuries of Biglands and Hentschel and concerns over Hart's age and durability. On 18 November 2006, Hart nominated for the national draft but was overlooked by all clubs.

He played for North Adelaide in the SANFL in 2007, helping them reach a grand final in 2007, and after this he announced his retirement.

From 2008 to 2011, Hart was an assistant coach for the Adelaide Crows. He was then an assistant coach for the Collingwood Magpies from 2012 to 2016. In 2018, Hart returned to the Adelaide Crows, resuming his role as assistant coach. He later left in 2020 and returned to Melbourne. His current role is as assistant coach for the GWS Giants, specializing in midfield and stoppages. He joined the club in 2023 as part of the new-look coaching team led by head coach Adam Kingsley.

== Statistics ==
Legend
G	Goals	K	Kicks	D	Disposals	T	Tackles
B	Behinds	H	Handballs	M	Marks

Season	Team	No.	Games	Totals							Averages (per game)						
Season	Team	No.	Games	G	B	K	H	D	M	T	G	B	K	H	D	M	T
1992	Adelaide	34	22	4	2	169	91	260	54	20	0.2	0.1	7.7	4.1	11.8	2.5	0.9
1993	Adelaide	34	20	2	1	134	67	201	35	31	0.1	0.1	6.7	3.4	10.1	1.8	1.6
1994	Adelaide	34	22	4	4	255	97	352	78	36	0.2	0.2	11.6	4.4	16.0	3.5	1.6
1995	Adelaide	34	21	10	7	222	74	296	60	37	0.5	0.3	10.6	3.5	14.1	2.9	1.8
1996	Adelaide	34	22	4	4	190	112	302	57	24	0.2	0.2	8.6	5.1	13.7	2.6	1.1
1997	Adelaide	34	26	2	6	287	80	367	102	31	0.1	0.2	11.0	3.1	14.1	3.9	1.2
1998	Adelaide	34	26	5	3	213	76	289	76	61	0.2	0.1	8.2	2.9	11.1	2.9	2.3
1999	Adelaide	34	21	3	2	229	81	310	90	21	0.1	0.1	10.9	3.9	14.8	4.3	1.0
2000	Adelaide	34	22	2	2	209	68	277	79	33	0.1	0.1	9.5	3.1	12.6	3.6	1.5
2001	Adelaide	34	22	4	4	256	72	328	78	46	0.2	0.2	11.6	3.3	14.9	3.5	2.1
2002	Adelaide	34	25	2	2	302	97	399	110	43	0.1	0.1	12.1	3.9	16.0	4.4	1.7
2003	Adelaide	34	21	0	2	217	80	297	73	46	0.0	0.1	10.3	3.8	14.1	3.5	2.2
2004	Adelaide	34	6	0	0	57	21	78	29	6	0.0	0.0	9.5	3.5	13.0	4.8	1.0
2005	Adelaide	34	22	3	1	215	111	326	85	35	0.1	0.0	9.8	5.0	14.8	3.9	1.6
2006	Adelaide	34	13	0	0	131	59	190	76	12	0.0	0.0	10.1	4.5	14.6	5.8	0.9
Career			311	45	40	3086	1186	4272	1082	482	0.1	0.1	9.9	3.8	13.7	3.5	1.5
