= Chris Ladhams =

Australian rules footballer

Personal information
- Full name: Chris Ladhams
- Born: 24 October 1980 (age 46)
- Original team: North Adelaide
- Draft: 23rd, 1998 AFL draft
- Height: 179 cm (5 ft 10 in)
- Weight: 78 kg (172 lb)

Playing career^{1}
Years	Club	Games (Goals)
1998–2000	Essendon	0 (0)
2001–2004	Adelaide	54 (37)
- ^{1} Playing statistics correct to the end of 2004.

Chris Ladhams (born 24 October 1980) is an Australian rules footballer who played with Adelaide in the Australian Football League (AFL).

Essendon initially recruited Ladhams, in the 1998 AFL draft, but in three seasons on their list wasn't able to break into the seniors. He was let go by the club and picked up by Adelaide with the fifth pick of the 2000 Pre-Season Draft.

Ladhams, a left footer, played as a utility and appeared in the opening 12 rounds of the 2001 AFL season. He performed well in 2002 and was in good form leading into the finals, averaging 23 disposals from round 15.

In the 2003 pre-season, Ladhams was a match-winner when he kicked a checkside goal from the left forward pocket to defeat rivals Port Adelaide in the dying seconds of their Wizard Cup encounter. They went on to beat Collingwood in the grand final.

He spent much of the 2003 AFL season up forward and kicked 20 goals for the year but wasn't able to hold his spot in the team for the finals series.

Ladhams added just six further games in 2004 but put in some good performances in the SANFL for North Adelaide, his original club, to win their "Best and Fairest". After being de-listed he continued playing for North Adelaide, from 2005 to 2008.

He played for Nhill in 2009 and 2010, and spent the summer months in the Northern Territory where he made appearances for Nightcliff. Since then he has played in many country teams and now returns home to Gaza in 2020.
