= Chris Groom =

Australian rules footballer, born 1973

Personal information
- Full name: Christopher Thomas Groom
- Born: 28 August 1973 (age 53)
- Original teams: Christies Beach (SFL); South Adelaide (SANFL)
- Draft: Adelaide: Zone Selection, 1992; Fremantle: Trade for Andrew McLeod, 1994; North Melbourne: Selection 26, 1995
- Height: 194 cm (6 ft 4 in)
- Weight: 95 kg (209 lb)
- Position: Centre-half forward

Playing career^{1}
Years	Club	Games (Goals)
1993–1994	Adelaide	12 (8)
1995	Fremantle	7 (18)
1996–1998	North Melbourne	5 (1)
Total		24 (27)
- ^{1} Playing statistics correct to the end of 2008.

Christopher Thomas Groom (born 28 August 1973) is a former Australian rules footballer who played for the Adelaide Football Club, Fremantle Football Club and North Melbourne Football Club in the Australian Football League (AFL).

== Career ==
Born in Adelaide, Groom had a very successful junior career for South Australian National Football League (SANFL) club South Adelaide, including playing in the 1990 under-17 premiership and the 1991 reserves premiership.

Following Adelaide's entry into the Australian Football League, they recruited Groom as one of the 8 South Australian players they could recruit prior to the 1992 AFL draft.

Groom made his senior SANFL debut for South Adelaide aged 18 in Round 1, 1992, against Glenelg, kicking 5 goals. He finished the year with 42 goals from 25 games, helping South Adelaide make the finals.

In 1993, Groom made his AFL debut in round 1 against Richmond, kicking 2 goals. After being plagued by illness and injury he was traded to Fremantle for the 1995 season and played in Fremantle's first ever game, kicking 3 goals. In exchange for Groom, Fremantle traded the rights to Andrew McLeod to Adelaide, a move for which Fremantle have been roundly criticised, as a result of McLeod's glittering career when compared to Groom's.

Despite kicking 18 goals in 7 games for Fremantle, Groom was surprisingly dropped 4 times. When not selected he played for West Perth, kicking 70 goals in 14 games including 5 goals in their premiership win over Subiaco.

After being delisted by Fremantle at the end of the 1995 season, he was selected by North Melbourne in the 1995 AFL draft. However a week before the 1996 season started, he sustained a knee injury requiring a total knee reconstruction. Unfortunately 5 months later the same knee buckled again and a second reconstruction was required; this in a season which saw North Melbourne take out both the reserves and senior premiership.

He returned to play senior football with North Melbourne at the end of the 1997 season and was a member of the 1998 Ansett Australia Cup winning team. He retired from AFL football at the end of 1998 due to injuries but went on to play in lower level leagues. He firstly played for the West Preston Lakeside Football Club in the Diamond Valley League, and then the Melbourne University Football Club in the Victorian Amateur Football Association (VAFA).

In 2011, he came out of retirement to play three games for the Chicago United Football Club in the Mid American Australian League 2011 Madison Invitational Tournament. He played in games against the Milwaukee Bombers, Minnesota Freeze, and Cincinnati Dockers, finishing with 10 goals and at least 10 behinds, helping Chicago United to a 2-1 record and 3rd-place finish.
