= Andrew Eccles =

Australian rules footballer (born 1979)

Personal information
- Full name: Andrew Eccles
- Born: 1 June 1979 (age 47)
- Original team: Northern Knights
- Height: 187 cm (6 ft 2 in)
- Weight: 84 kg (185 lb)

Playing career^{1}
Years	Club	Games (Goals)
1998 – 2001	Adelaide	41 (22)
2002 – 2003	Carlton	13 (2)
Total		54 (24)
- ^{1} Playing statistics correct to the end of 2003.

Career highlights
- AFL Premiership player (1998); AFL Rising Star nominee (1998)

Andrew Eccles (born 1 June 1979) is a former Australian rules footballer who played in the Australian Football League.

Eccles played TAC Cup football for the Northern Knights, and was recruited to the AFL in the 1996 AFL draft by the Adelaide Football Club.

Eccles did not play an AFL game in his first season with the Crows, playing for Norwood in the SANFL where he was selected at pick 1 in the mini draft. The 17 year old Eccles played a majority of the season in Reserves for Norwood.

He made his AFL debut in the 1998 season, playing 18 games and earning a rising star nomination in round 19. Playing on the wing he was the youngest member of Adelaide's 1998 AFL Grand Final winning team.

Hamstring, knee and Achilles tendon injuries affected his performance over the next three seasons, playing only 22 AFL games.

He was traded to Carlton at the end of the 2001 season as a straight swap for Kris Massie. His time at Carlton was generally unsuccessful, and he was delisted at the end of 2003.

After being delisted, he played for North Ballarat in the VFL from 2004 until 2005. He was selected in the VFL Team of the Year in 2004.

== Career ==
- Adelaide: 1998–2001, 41 games, 22 goals.
- Carlton: 2002–03, 13 games, 2 goals.

== Statistics ==
Legend
G	Goals	K	Kicks	D	Disposals	T	Tackles
B	Behinds	H	Handballs	M	Marks

Season	Team	No.	Games	Totals							Averages (per game)						
Season	Team	No.	Games	G	B	K	H	D	M	T	G	B	K	H	D	M	T
1998†	Adelaide	33	18	13	7	112	57	169	40	26	0.7	0.4	6.2	3.2	9.4	2.2	1.4
1999	Adelaide	33	8	4	2	81	39	120	19	11	0.5	0.3	10.1	4.9	15.0	2.4	1.4
2000	Adelaide	33	10	4	5	103	43	146	43	12	0.4	0.5	10.3	4.3	14.6	4.3	1.2
2001	Adelaide	33	5	1	1	37	7	44	10	6	0.2	0.2	7.4	1.4	8.8	2.0	1.2
2002	Carlton	20	11	2	3	94	41	135	35	24	0.2	0.3	8.5	3.7	12.3	3.2	2.2
2003	Carlton	20	2	0	0	4	3	7	0	6	0.0	0.0	2.0	1.5	3.5	0.0	3.0
Career			54	24	18	431	190	621	147	85	0.4	0.3	8.0	3.5	11.5	2.7	1.6

== Player Honours ==
- 1998 Premiership Player
