= Matthew Collins (Australian footballer) =

Australian rules footballer, born 1977

Personal information
- Full name: Matthew Collins
- Born: 2 February 1977 (age 49)
- Original team: Macleod (DVFL)
- Draft: 38th Overall, 1994 AFL Draft
- Height: 186 cm (6 ft 1 in)
- Weight: 85 kg (187 lb)

Playing career^{1}
Years	Club	Games (Goals)
1996–1997	Adelaide	14 (2)
1998–2001	Melbourne	29 (5)
Total		43 (7)
- ^{1} Playing statistics correct to the end of 2001.

Matthew Collins (born 2 February 1977) is a former Australian rules footballer who played in the Australian Football League. He was well known for a large distinct Indian tattoo on his shoulder.

He played originally for the Macleod Football Club in Victoria.

== AFL career ==
=== Adelaide ===
Collins was drafted at pick 38 from Northern U18 where he was regarded as a promising running defender. Collins broke his leg playing for North Adelaide in the SANFL and missed out on AFL football in his first year. He made his AFL debut in round 10 1996, playing 8 games in his debut season. Groin injury hampered his 1997 season managing 6 games late in the season. He was omitted before finals and missed out on playing in the Crows first premiership. After the death of a close friend, Williams asked to move back to Melbourne, during his time with the Crows he had broken his leg, had three groin operations and had broken the same forearm twice. He was traded alongside Brent Williams for Nathan Bassett,

=== Melbourne ===
Collins made his debut for Melbourne in 1998 but missed the start of the season with a hernia, and broke his arm again. After only 2 games in 1999 Collins had a career best year in 2000. He played a full season of football without injury and played 14 AFL games, including the 2000 AFL Grand Final loss. Collins played 9 games in 2001 but a knee injury ruined his second half of the season and was delisted at seasons end.

Collins received interest from St Kilda but was not drafted, he played the 2002 season at Northern Bullants.
