= Andrew McLeod =

Australian rules footballer (born 1976)

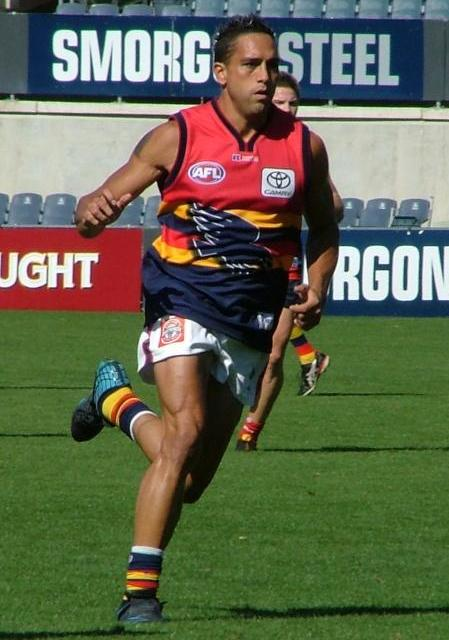
- McLeod playing for Adelaide in 2005

Personal information
- Full name: Andrew Luke McLeod
- Nicknames: Bunji, Macca
- Born: 4 August 1976 (age 50); Darwin, Northern Territory, Australia
- Original team: Darwin (NTFL)/Port Adelaide (SANFL)
- Draft: Traded from Fremantle, 1994 AFL draft
- Height: 181 cm (5 ft 11 in)
- Weight: 81 kg (179 lb)
- Positions: Half-back, half forward, midfield

Playing career^{1}
Years	Club	Games (Goals)
1994	Port Adelaide (SANFL)	23 (36)
1995–2010	Adelaide	340 (275)
Total		363 (311)

Representative team honours
Years	Team	Games (Goals)
1997	Allies	1 (0)
2008	Dream Team	1 (0)

International team honours
2000, 2001 & 2005(c)	Australia	6 (0)
- ^{1} Playing statistics correct to the end of Round 17, 2010.

Career highlights
- Australian Football Hall of Fame; 2× AFL premiership player (1997, 1998); 2× Norm Smith Medal (1997, 1998); Leigh Matthews Trophy (2001); 5× All-Australian team (1998, 2000, 2001, 2006, 2007(c)); 3× Malcolm Blight Medal (1997, 2001, 2007); Adelaide pre-season premiership (2003); Michael Tuck Medal (2003); International Rules Series captain (2007); Jim Stynes Medal (2005); Showdown Medal (2007); Polly Farmer Medal (2007); Adelaide Team of the Decade - Half Back flank; Dream Team captain (2008); AFL Rising Star nominee (1995); Indigenous Team of the Century; SANFL Premiership player: (1994); Northern Territory NEAFL premiership side (2011)

Andrew Luke McLeod (born 4 August 1976) is a former professional Australian rules footballer who played for the Adelaide Football Club in the Australian Football League (AFL). He is the games record holder for Adelaide, having played 340 games.

McLeod is considered by many as the greatest player to have played for the Adelaide Football Club. McLeod won two premierships for the Adelaide Football Club in 1997 and 1998. He was also awarded the Norm Smith Medal for best on ground in the 1997 and 1998 AFL Grand Finals.

== Childhood ==
McLeod was born in Darwin, Northern Territory. He is Indigenous with Aboriginal (Wardaman) and Torres Strait Islander (Wagadagam) descent from Badu and Mabuiag Islands through his mother, while his father Jock McLeod is of Scottish descent. McLeod had an older sister and older brother and was the family's youngest child. When McLeod was young, his family moved to Katherine, near Wardaman country, before returning to Darwin in early 1985. He was educated at St John’s College Darwin.

As a child, McLeod supported the Essendon Football Club, and he also had experiences with AFL player and Darwin local Michael McLean.

My idol was Michael Mclean, number 51. I loved watching him play. He always gave me time when he came home. Seeing him on TV on the Winners and then when he came home you got to sit down with him and have a chat. He'd talk about what training you needed to do and the big league. I still keep in touch with him.

— Andrew McLeod

== Early football career ==
McLeod played a variety of sports as a junior, including athletics, soccer, rugby union, rugby league and Australian rules football. His family had a long history of playing for the Darwin Football Club in the Northern Territory Football League, starting with his great-grandfather Put, down to his father, who had played over 200 games, so McLeod also began playing for their senior team in 1993. As a gifted player, he was selected to represent the Northern Territory in the Teal Cup, where he was voted best-on-ground in the team's win against Victoria.

Port Adelaide Football Club chief executive officer Brian Cunningham called McLeod's father Jock to offer McLeod a contract to play for Port Adelaide in the South Australian National Football League for $250 per game. Jock knew that moving to Adelaide to play football would be daunting for McLeod, so he secretly negotiated with Port Adelaide to drop his son off at in Adelaide and then leave. The pair drove to Adelaide and stayed in the home of the Duffield family, who were Port Adelaide supporters. McLeod wasn't told that he'd be staying behind until the morning that his father left him there. Despite the rough start, McLeod very quickly rose through the ranks of the Port Adelaide team. He started by playing one game in the Under-17s side, followed by one game in the Under-19s side and four games in the reserves side, then finishing the season with 14 consecutive games in the senior team, including becoming a premiership player by winning the 1994 SANFL Grand Final.

The Fremantle Football Club was entering the Australian Football League in the 1995 season, and as part of the recruitment concessions they have been given, they sought to recruit McLeod. When McLeod met with Fremantle, coach Gerard Neesham had not seen him play before and asked McLeod to stand up to show how tall he was. McLeod felt insulted and belittled and refused to play for Fremantle. Adelaide's recruiter Tim Johnson heard that the negotiations weren't going well, so Adelaide Football Club general manager Bill Sanders contacted McLeod's father to let him know the club was interested in recruiting him. Adelaide and Fremantle negotiated a trade the day before the trading deadline, with Fremantle receiving forward Chris Groom in return. The Crows had to compete for McLeod with Collingwood, who had offered an inducement to McLeod's father if he was able to convince McLeod to sign with them.

== AFL career ==
=== First years at Adelaide (1995–1996) ===
Adelaide players initially gave McLeod nickname "Hamburger" because he was seen as chubby, but soon adopted the nickname "Bunji" (which means "Brother") that he had been given while playing in Darwin. He made his AFL debut for the Crows in their Round 6 match against Melbourne, which the Crows won by 8 points, but McLeod spent most of the game on the interchange bench and only touched the ball four times through the game. McLeod was dropped after this game, then played his second game in Round 9 against Hawthorn. Adelaide trailed Hawthorn by 34 points at half time, but launched a comeback in the second half. They were still down by 4 points in the dying seconds of the game. The ball was kicked inside Adelaide's forward 50, and McLeod raced at the ball, competing with Hawk defender Ray Jencke. He was able to recover the ball, evade Jencke's attempts to tackle him, and kick a dribbling goal from a tight angle to win the game for Adelaide.

McLeod, somehow, miraculously gathers possession of this wet and slippery ball, arches his back, goes one way and then the other and leaves Jencke slipping and sliding in his wake. Then, against the pressure of time and finding himself in a position to somehow conceive a way to win, he calmly caresses the greasy ball onto and across his boot and dribbles it through the goals in an arc from the boundary.

— Robert Shaw, Adelaide coach

Later in the year, McLeod was nominated for the Norwich Rising Star award, but he discovered towards the end of the 1995 season that he had broken several bones in his feet, and he had to have injections in his feet to play the last seven rounds without pain. The injuries came as a result of McLeod being forced to wear boots made by Adidas, who were a Crows sponsor at the time. Adidas boots didn't fit McLeod's foot shape, so once it became apparent that the shoes were causing his injuries, McLeod started wearing Puma boots with Adidas stripes painted on them. This lasted until he signed an exclusive agreement with Adidas to have them custom-make shoes that would fit his feet from 1998 on.

=== Dual premierships and Norm Smith medals (1997–1999) ===
==== 1997 ====
McLeod's breakout year came in 1997 under Adelaide's new coach, Malcolm Blight. During pre-season training, Blight had the team doing a lot of running, which helped McLeod lose a significant amount of weight. Blight had first seen McLeod in the 1995 game against Hawthorn that saw him kick the winning goal, so Blight played him in the forward line until he had a discussion with Stephen Williams, who had been McLeod's coach at Port Adelaide in the SANFL. Williams said that he had been used at half-back, so Blight had McLeod play there for the rest of the season.

I said to Stephen: 'What about Andrew?'. He said, 'Well, we got him as a half-back flanker from Darwin'. And that was almost the light bulb moment for me. ... McLeod slotted in there beautifully. Some of the games he played there in '97, he was almost faultless, he could beat his man, and then set us up.

— Malcolm Blight

McLeod had a standout moment in Round 19 in Showdown II against Port Adelaide, kicking a difficult goal in the final minutes to give the Crows a 7-point lead that they carried to the end of the game.

In the preliminary final against the Western Bulldogs, McLeod, who had been playing primarily as a forward or half-back flanker, was placed into the midfield in the second half by Blight in an effort to spark the Crows side, who trailed by 31 points at half-time. It would be the first time in McLeod's career that he would play in the midfield; and, in a thrilling contest, McLeod and the Crows would win the match by two points to reach the Grand Final for the first time in the club's history.

In the Grand Final against St Kilda, McLeod would take his first significant step in his journey towards joining the game's elite. Accumulating 31 disposals and 11 marks, he was judged best on ground against the Saints, winning the prestigious Norm Smith Medal while helping his team win the AFL premiership. This was followed shortly thereafter with a gold jacket when he was named as the Crows Best and Fairest for the 1997 season.

Because of McLeod's success, the Brisbane Lions approached him with an offer to move clubs, but McLeod chose to stay with Adelaide.

==== 1998 ====
Having caught the eye of football followers with his magical feats in the 1997 finals, McLeod would continue to dazzle crowds with his pace and agility in 1998 before being named in the All-Australian team for the first time in his career despite only playing 15 games due to injury. He would also get 10 Brownlow Medal votes in 1998 after only 1 vote in 1997.

In a preliminary final rematch against the Bulldogs, McLeod would kick a career-high seven goals while being opposed to Tony Liberatore, who was reputed to be the most ferocious tagger in the game at the time. In the following game—against Grand Final favourites, the Kangaroos—the Crows would win by 35 points, with McLeod emulating his feats from a year earlier. Gathering 30 disposals and winning back-to-back Norm Smith Medals, McLeod became the first player to win two Norm Smith Medals since Gary Ayres in 1986 and 1988.

==== 1999 ====
Adelaide would not match the success of the two previous seasons in 1999 and would finish 13th; however, McLeod continued on progressing as one of Adelaide's young stars, gathering 7 Brownlow votes.

=== Playing under Gary Ayres (2000–2004) ===
==== 2000 ====
McLeod had an outstanding season in 2000, playing most of the season in the midfield. He averaged 24 disposals per game, an increase from 18 in 1999, and kicked 28 goals. He made the All-Australian team as a half-forward, narrowly finished second in Adelaide's Best and Fairest to Simon Goodwin, and polled 20 Brownlow Medal votes, finishing third behind Shane Woewodin and runner-up Scott West.

==== 2001 ====
McLeod had perhaps the finest season of his career in 2001, controversially being named runner-up in the Brownlow Medal Count. Having been made a permanent fixture in the Crows midfield by coach Gary Ayres, McLeod averaged a career-best 24.7 disposals. He would win the Leigh Matthews Trophy to be recognised as the Most Valuable Player in the league, according to a vote by his peers in the AFL Players Association, as well as his second best-and-fairest award from the club.

McLeod, however, would be denied the AFL's greatest individual honour in the 2001 Brownlow Medal. The Crows had arranged for McLeod's father Jock to come to the Brownlow count without his knowledge as a surprise for if McLeod won. Trailing by two votes in the last round to Jason Akermanis of the Brisbane Lions, he had amassed a season-high 37 disposals in Adelaide's final round loss to Fremantle; however, he was awarded no votes in that game, and he consequently finished second behind Akermanis. Akermanis later wrote, "I stole the Brownlow from Andrew McLeod," as McLeod was a raging favourite and won the majority of media awards for the year.

==== 2002 ====
McLeod had another fine season in 2002, but he was reported in round 4 for the first and only time in his career due to a late charge on Essendon's Matthew Lloyd. McLeod received a one-match ban for the incident, playing every other game of the season and amassing 16 Brownlow votes; however, he only finished equal 6th in the best and fairest.

==== 2003 ====
McLeod played every game of the home-and-away season in yet another superb year. He would lead the 2003 Brownlow medal count until round 15, remarkably having six best-on-ground performances up until that point, according to the officiating umpires of matches McLeod played in. However, McLeod never got any more votes and would finish 10th with 18 votes, although the margin was only 4 points between McLeod and the joint winners; teammate Mark Ricciuto was one of these players. He would finish 3rd in the Adelaide best and fairest.

==== 2004 ====
2004 was a disappointing year for Adelaide, and coach Gary Ayres would be sacked later in the year. McLeod only polled two votes in the Brownlow despite a season disposal average of 21.

=== Playing under Neil Craig (2005–2010) ===
==== 2005 ====
In 2005, under coach Neil Craig, McLeod made a return to the half-back line to provide his side with run and drive from defence using his sublime skills. McLeod polled 11 votes in the 2005 Brownlow Medal.

In October, McLeod was named co-captain of the Australian International rules football team against Ireland. In what became a somewhat spiteful match, Australia would win comfortably, while McLeod was named best player and awarded the Jim Stynes Medal.

In 2005, McLeod was named in the Indigenous Team of the Century in the position of ruck rover.

==== 2006 ====
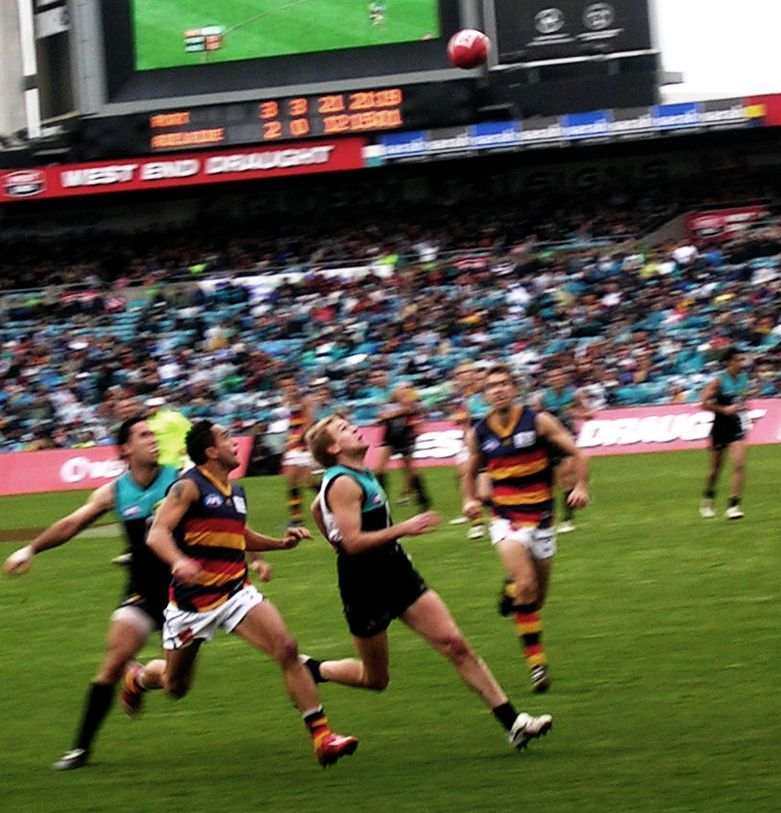
McLeod challenging a mark in a game against Port Adelaide

After a year under Neil Craig's system, McLeod would return to some of his best form, leading to his 4th All-Australian selection.

Against the Essendon Football Club in round 10 at AAMI Stadium, McLeod played his 250th AFL game, where he tallied 18 disposals while soaring for a spectacular mark in a 138-point demolition of the Bombers.

For much of the season, however, McLeod played with a bursa in his left foot. After round 16, the decision was made for him to undergo surgery to remove the bursa, an operation expected to keep him out for a few weeks.

McLeod made a relatively earlier-than-expected return to the side in round 19. However, by round 21, after a disappointing loss to Port Adelaide, his foot was heavily infected, and the club announced that he would require further surgery along with the disappointing news that he would more than likely miss the rest of the season and finals. McLeod's injury would later prove to be a huge blow to Adelaide's premiership chances.

Despite rating himself just a "two out of ten" chance to return for the finals, McLeod made a surprise return to the side in the preliminary final against the West Coast Eagles. After a promising first half, however, McLeod and the Crows were swamped by the West Coast midfield in the second half to eventually lose by ten points. McLeod only polled seven votes in the 2006 Brownlow Medal despite averaging 22 possessions and being named All-Australian. He finished 4th in Adelaide's best and fairest.

==== 2007 ====
Prior to the start of the AFL 2007 season, McLeod won the Polly Farmer Medal after being the best for the Indigenous All-Stars in a 50-point loss to Essendon. McLeod, the side's captain, kicked two goals to be his team's leading goalkicker.

McLeod played most of 2007 again as a half-back flanker, sweeping up loose balls and creating his trademark run out of defence with his smooth skills. McLeod, however, was well held in his final game of the season, finishing with just 12 disposals after being heavily tagged by Hawthorn's Richard Vandenberg in Adelaide's elimination final loss to the Hawks.

Nevertheless, McLeod had a fine season; his average of 23.9 disposals was his highest since finishing runner-up for the Brownlow Medal in 2001. This was duly acknowledged when he was announced as captain and a half-back flanker of the 2007 All-Australian team. McLeod polled 15 votes in the 2007 Brownlow Medal and won the club's Best and Fairest award.

==== 2008 ====
Four weeks after returning from a stint on the sidelines due to knee surgery, McLeod celebrated his 300-game milestone with a 63-point victory over Richmond in round 19. Andrew McLeod is just the second Aboriginal player to reach 300 games. After the season's conclusion, however, McLeod's knee flared up again, forcing him to have surgery during the off-season.

==== 2009 ====
On his return from injury, McLeod captained the Indigenous All-Stars in the 2009 pre-season. McLeod continued to perform consistently for the Crows, and in round 9 (fittingly, it was Indigenous Round) he played his 313th game, breaking the club games record held by former teammate and good friend Mark Ricciuto.

==== 2010 final season and retirements ====
McLeod began the 2010 season healthy and in decent form. However, in a round 11 match against Fremantle, he re-injured his troubled right knee, ultimately keeping him sidelined for a month. He returned on 16 July 2010 in a round 16 match against Geelong in which Adelaide won by 11 points. This would ultimately be McLeod's last game of AFL football, as his knee continued to have problems. On 23 August 2010, McLeod announced his retirement from AFL football. Andrew McLeod's retirement announcement:

"To the supporters of the Adelaide Football Club, I thank you for sharing my journey and making it a most memorable one. To all my coaches, I am eternally grateful for passing on your knowledge to make me a better player and a person, And finally to my teammates, past and present, without you guys, nothing I have achieved in footy would have been made possible if it weren't for all of you. Thanks for making it the most amazing journey, one I can only dream of"

Following his retirement, McLeod has been compared with Jason Akermanis and Ben Cousins as three greats of the AFL who all retired in 2010.

== Later career ==
In 2011, McLeod signed a part-time contract with the Northern Territory Football Club in the inaugural North East Australian Football League season, and played a total of eight games for the Thunder, including the finals series. McLeod was a part of the Thunder's Northern Conference and NEAFL premiership teams.

== Statistics ==
Legend
G	Goals	K	Kicks	D	Disposals	T	Tackles
B	Behinds	H	Handballs	M	Marks
#	Played in that season's premiership team

Season	Team	No.	Games	Totals							Averages (per game)							Votes
Season	Team	No.	Games	G	B	K	H	D	M	T	G	B	K	H	D	M	T	Votes
1995	Adelaide	23	15	17	12	101	61	162	20	18	1.1	0.8	6.7	4.1	10.8	1.3	1.2	0
1996	Adelaide	23	19	20	12	110	84	194	31	22	1.1	0.6	5.8	4.4	10.2	1.6	1.2	0
1997^{#}	Adelaide	23	26	10	8	287	151	438	96	51	0.4	0.3	11.0	5.8	16.8	3.7	2.0	1
1998^{#}	Adelaide	23	19	30	20	232	101	333	67	42	1.6	1.1	12.2	5.3	17.5	3.5	2.2	10
1999	Adelaide	23	22	21	13	281	127	408	82	35	1.0	0.6	12.8	5.8	18.5	3.7	1.6	7
2000	Adelaide	23	22	28	14	371	153	524	80	49	1.3	0.6	16.9	7.0	23.8	3.6	2.2	20
2001	Adelaide	23	23	29	27	408	160	568	71	63	1.3	1.2	17.7	7.0	24.7	3.1	2.7	21
2002	Adelaide	23	23	25	22	322	190	512	76	74	1.1	1.0	14.0	8.3	22.3	3.3	3.2	16
2003	Adelaide	23	24	29	14	327	172	499	45	65	1.2	0.6	13.6	7.2	20.8	1.9	2.7	18
2004	Adelaide	23	22	13	12	312	160	472	61	67	0.6	0.5	14.2	7.3	21.5	2.8	3.0	2
2005	Adelaide	23	25	13	13	301	155	456	73	51	0.5	0.5	12.0	6.2	18.2	2.9	2.0	11
2006	Adelaide	23	20	6	6	287	159	446	93	51	0.3	0.3	14.4	8.0	22.3	4.7	2.6	7
2007	Adelaide	23	23	6	5	373	177	550	81	40	0.3	0.2	16.2	7.7	23.9	3.5	1.7	15
2008	Adelaide	23	21	9	5	297	129	426	69	34	0.4	0.2	14.1	6.1	20.3	3.3	1.6	4
2009	Adelaide	23	24	10	10	310	212	522	76	60	0.4	0.4	12.9	8.8	21.8	3.2	1.7	7
2010	Adelaide	23	12	9	3	121	93	214	36	30	0.8	0.3	10.1	7.8	17.8	3.0	2.5	3
Career			340	275	196	4440	2284	6724	1057	752	0.8	0.6	13.1	6.7	19.8	3.1	2.2	142

== Honours and achievements ==
- AFL
  - Team
    - AFL Premiership (Adelaide): 1997, 1998
    - McClelland Trophy (Adelaide): 2005
    - Pre-Season Cup (Adelaide): 2003
  - Individual
    - VFLPA MVP Award (Later named the Leigh Matthews Trophy): 2001
    - Malcolm Blight Medal (Adelaide F.C. Best & Fairest): 1997, 2001, 2007
    - Norm Smith Medal: 1997, 1998
    - All-Australian: 1998, 2000, 2001, 2006, 2007 (C)
    - Australian Representative Honours in International Rules Football: 2001, 2002, 2005 (C)
    - Jim Stynes Medal: 2005
    - Indigenous All-Stars Representative Honours: 2003 (C), 2005, 2007 (C), 2009 (C)
    - Polly Farmer Medal: 2007
    - Dream Team Representative Honours in AFL Hall of Fame Tribute Match: 2008 (C)
    - Michael Tuck Medal: 2003
    - Showdown Medal: 2007 (Round 3)
    - AFL Rising Star Nominee: 1995 (Round 20)
    - 300 Game Player
    - Adelaide F.C. Games Record Holder: 340 Games
    - Indigenous Team of the Century - Ruck Rover
    - Merv Agars Medal: 2000, 2001
- SANFL
  - Team
    - SANFL Premiership (Port Adelaide): 1994
- NEAFL
  - Team
    - NEAFL Premiership (Northern Territory): 2011

== Controversies ==
In 2005, McLeod and former friend tennis player Lleyton Hewitt had a much publicised dispute over the use of footage shot at Aboriginal sacred sites in a DVD Hewitt was to release.

McLeod admitted in 2018 in a podcast that he doesn't feel welcome at his old club in the Crows saying "the Crows doesn't really have that vibe" referring to other clubs having players come to their former clubs and feel welcomed back.
