= Brent Williams (Australian footballer) =

Australian rules footballer

Personal information
- Full name: Brent Cameron Williams
- Born: 13 February 1978 (age 48)
- Original team: Prahran Dragons
- Draft: 18th, 1995 AFL draft
- Height: 190 cm (6 ft 3 in)
- Weight: 85 kg (187 lb)

Playing career^{1}
Years	Club	Games (Goals)
1997	Adelaide	7 (4)
1998	Melbourne	0 (0)
- ^{1} Playing statistics correct to the end of 1998.

Brent Cameron Williams (born 13 February 1978) is a former Australian rules footballer who played with Adelaide in the Australian Football League (AFL).

Williams came from Victoria and represented his state at Under-17 level, where he was an All-Australian. A forward, he came the way of Adelaide in the 1995 AFL draft, with a pick that they had received from Geelong in return for Martin McKinnon. After spending the 1996 season playing in the South Australian National Football League (SANFL) with West Adelaide, Williams appeared in the opening seven rounds for Adelaide in 1997.

He was traded, along with Matthew Collins, to Melbourne at the end of the year, in return for defender Nathan Bassett. Although he led the reserves' goal-kicking in 1998, he was unable to break into the seniors.

In both 2002 and 2004, Williams was the leading goal-kicker in the first division of the Eastern Football League, with Noble Park.
