= Mark Stevens (footballer) =

Australian rules footballer

Personal information
- Born: 25 October 1975 (age 51); Victoria, Australia
- Original team: Gippsland Power (TAC Cup) / Heyfield
- Debut: Round 10, 2 June 1995, North Melbourne vs. Essendon, at the MCG
- Height: 194 cm (6 ft 4 in)
- Weight: 88 kg (194 lb)

Playing career^{1}
Years	Club	Games (Goals)
1995–1997	North Melbourne	21 (20)
1998–2005	Adelaide	101 (103)
Total		122 (123)
- ^{1} Playing statistics correct to the end of 2005.

Career highlights
- AFL Premiership player (1998)

Mark Stevens (born 25 October 1975) is a former Australian rules footballer in the Australian Football League.

== Playing statistics ==
Legend
G	Goals	K	Kicks	D	Disposals	T	Tackles
B	Behinds	H	Handballs	M	Marks

Season	Team	No.	Games	Totals							Averages (per game)						
Season	Team	No.	Games	G	B	K	H	D	M	T	G	B	K	H	D	M	T
1995	North Melbourne	36	8	12	4	33	14	47	13	3	1.5	0.5	4.1	1.8	5.9	1.6	0.4
1996	North Melbourne	36	8	7	5	32	26	58	17	5	0.9	0.6	4.0	3.3	7.3	2.1	0.6
1997	North Melbourne	36	5	1	1	24	4	28	7	3	0.2	0.2	4.8	0.8	5.6	1.4	0.6
1998	Adelaide	19	20	8	12	139	69	208	51	27	0.4	0.6	7.0	3.5	10.4	2.6	1.4
1999	Adelaide	19	21	11	12	169	96	265	70	23	0.5	0.6	8.0	4.6	12.6	3.3	1.1
2000	Adelaide	19	2	0	1	7	4	11	3	0	0.0	0.5	3.5	2.0	5.5	1.5	0.0
2001	Adelaide	19	22	21	8	183	143	326	118	37	1.0	0.4	8.3	6.5	14.8	5.4	1.7
2002	Adelaide	19	23	38	29	204	125	329	106	42	1.7	1.3	8.9	5.4	14.3	4.6	1.8
2003	Adelaide	19	8	17	6	51	34	85	29	9	2.1	0.8	6.4	4.3	10.6	3.6	1.1
2004	Adelaide	19	3	8	4	23	7	30	11	7	2.7	1.3	7.7	2.3	10.0	3.7	2.3
2005	Adelaide	19	2	0	1	5	1	6	3	0	0.0	0.5	2.5	0.5	3.0	1.5	0.0
Career			122	123	83	870	523	1393	428	156	1.0	0.7	7.1	4.3	11.4	3.5	1.3
