= Rhett Biglands =

Australian rules footballer

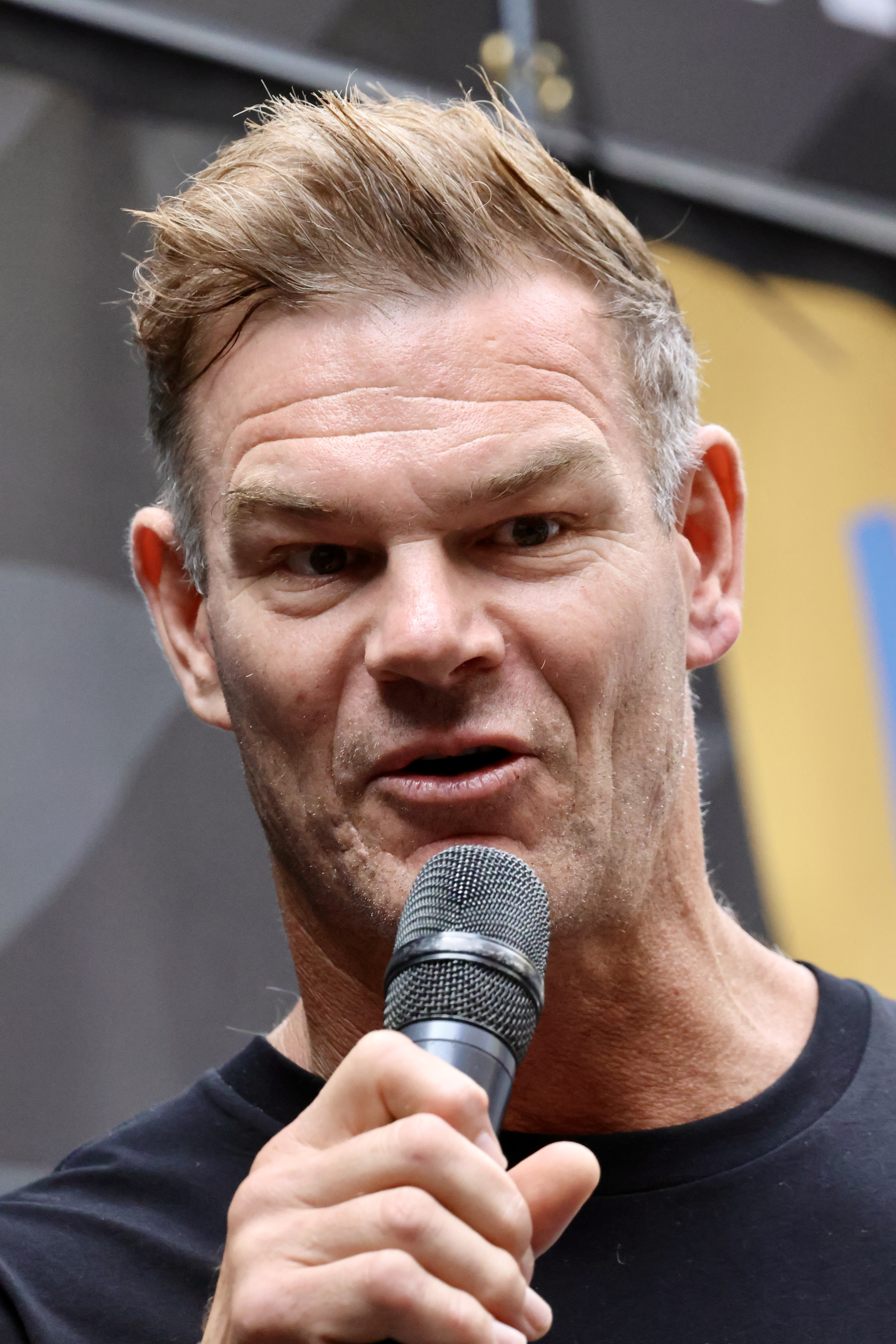
- Biglands at the 2026 Gather Round

Personal information
- Full name: Rhett Biglands
- Born: 4 September 1977 (age 49)
- Original team: Woodville-West Torrens (SANFL)
- Height: 200 cm (6 ft 7 in)
- Weight: 104 kg (229 lb)

Playing career^{1}
Years	Club	Games (Goals)
2000–2008	Adelaide	134 (59)
- ^{1} Playing statistics correct to the end of 2008.

Career highlights
- Pre-season premiership player, 2003

Rhett Biglands (born 4 September 1977) is a former Australian rules footballer in the Australian Football League.

== Career ==
He made his debut as an 18-year-old in the SANFL with Woodville West Torrens kicking 5 goals in his first match. He was then drafted by Port Adelaide Power and placed on their inaugural list in 1997. After two groin reconstructions in the one year he returned to the SANFL. In the 1999 season he was equal 3rd in the Magarey Medal, played for South Australia against Victoria on the MCG and made The Advertiser SANFL team of the Year.

Selected by the Crows with their first pick and debuting in the AFL in 2000 as a full back playing on Alistair Lynch, Biglands then made his name as a ruckman with the Adelaide Crows. He was one of the Crows’ best ruckmen for many years in a successful finals era for the club. He played in the 2003 pre season premiership side and amassed 134 games including 59 goals and 11 Finals appearances.

He suffered a serious knee injury in the second quarter of the 2006 preliminary final vs the West Coast Eagles at AAMI Stadium. Biglands and several other players dived for the ball in a desperate scramble in front of the interchange bench. As Biglands dived forward, his teammate Nathan Van Berlo dived heavily into his left leg snapping Biglands' left leg about 30 degrees causing him to clutch the knee and tearing the ACL inside his knee; he limped off and attempted to come back, but was to no avail. After missing the 2007 season due to reconstructive surgery of the knee, he sustained instability in the knee during a summer training session as the reconstructed ligament gave away. He had a second reconstruction on the knee in late February 2008.

On 18 August 2008, Biglands officially retired from AFL due to the prolonged recovery from the knee injury. He was given a lap of honour of AAMI Stadium, before the 2008 round 22 game against the Western Bulldogs.

Biglands then went on to work as a breakfast radio announcer with SAFM in Adelaide and is currently an AFL radio commentator with Triple M.

From 2008–2010, he worked full-time at the Adelaide Crows in the Commercial Operations department servicing corporate agreements and negotiating sponsorship contracts.

Since 2006 he has been a youth ambassador for "The Conservation Volunteers of Australia" and "Can Do for Kids" which is a charity helping children with visual and hearing impairments.

He was an assistant coach at Woodville West Torrens from 2010–2012 including the 2011 SANFL Premiership. In 2011, Biglands was named as first Ruck in The Eagles AFL team of two decades alongside the likes of Scott Camporeale and Matthew Pavlich.

In 2010, Biglands opened South Australia's first Nike store in Rundle Mall and in 2012 he opened his second store in Westfield Marion and is currently their managing director. In 2015, he worked for Triple M, co-hosting their Sunday Dead Set Legends program with former power Captain Dom Cassisi.
