= 1998 AFL finals series =

1998 AFL premiership season
- Teams: 8
- Premiers: Adelaide Football Club; 2nd premiership
- Minor premiers: North Melbourne Football Club; 10th minor premiership
- Matches played: 9

The Australian Football League's 1998 finals series began on Friday, 4 September 1998 and culminated with the 102nd AFL Grand Final at the Melbourne Cricket Ground on Saturday, 26 September 1998. Eight of the league's sixteen teams qualified for the finals based on the home-and-away season, and the finals were played under the McIntyre final eight system.

The series concluded with the grand final, which saw the Adelaide Crows (5th placed after the home-and-away season, 13–9) win its second consecutive premiership, defeating minor premiers North Melbourne (16–6) by 35 points. Adelaide was the lowest placed team after the home-and-away season to win the premiership since 1900.

== Final Ladder ==
(P)	Premiers
	Qualified for finals

#	Team	P	W	L	D	PF	PA	%	Pts
1	North Melbourne	22	16	6	0	2486	2117	117.4	64
2	Western Bulldogs	22	15	7	0	2353	2019	116.5	60
3	Sydney	22	14	8	0	2283	2143	106.5	56
4	Melbourne	22	14	8	0	2009	1956	102.7	56
5	Adelaide (P)	22	13	9	0	2172	1763	123.2	52
6	St Kilda	22	13	9	0	2148	2104	102.1	52
7	West Coast	22	12	10	0	1940	1773	109.4	48
8	Essendon	22	12	10	0	2250	2071	108.6	48
9	Richmond	22	12	10	0	2018	1926	104.8	48
10	Port Adelaide	22	9	12	1	1928	2017	95.6	38
11	Carlton	22	9	13	0	2018	2109	95.7	36
12	Geelong	22	9	13	0	1777	1963	90.5	36
13	Hawthorn	22	8	14	0	1992	2083	95.6	32
14	Collingwood	22	7	15	0	1968	2167	90.8	28
15	Fremantle	22	7	15	0	1739	2277	76.4	28
16	Brisbane Lions	22	5	16	1	1860	2453	75.8	22

Rules for classification: 1. premiership points; 2. percentage; 3. points for
Average score: 93.6
Source: AFL Tables

== Week One ==
=== Qualifying Finals ===
Home team	Score	Away team	Score	Venue	Attendance	Date
North Melbourne	11.16 (82)	Essendon	8.12 (60)	MCG	71,154	Friday, 4 September
Melbourne	17.13 (115)	Adelaide	9.13 (67)	MCG	60,817	Saturday, 5 September
Sydney	12.17 (89)	St Kilda	13.9 (87)	SCG	36,076	Saturday, 5 September
Western Bulldogs	18.13 (121)	West Coast	7.9 (51)	MCG	43,025	Sunday, 6 September

== Week Two ==
=== Semi finals ===
Home team	Score	Away team	Score	Venue	Attendance	Date
Melbourne	15.17 (107)	St Kilda	7.14 (56)	MCG	88,456	Saturday, 12 September
Sydney	10.7 (67)	Adelaide	14.10 (94)	SCG	37,498	Saturday, 12 September

== Week Three ==
=== Preliminary Finals ===
Home team	Score	Away team	Score	Venue	Attendance	Date
North Melbourne	17.12 (114)	Melbourne	12.12 (84)	MCG	73,719	Friday, 18 September
Western Bulldogs	13.15 (93)	Adelaide	24.17 (161)	MCG	67,557	Saturday, 19 September

North Melbourne won its eleventh consecutive match. Adelaide defeated the Western Bulldogs in a preliminary final for the second consecutive year.

== Grand final ==
Team	1	2	3	Final
Adelaide	3.2	4.3	9.11	15.15 (105)
North Melbourne	4.4	6.15	8.15	8.22 (70)

Date	Saturday, 26 September 1998, 2:30pm AEST
Coin Toss Winner	North Melbourne, chose Punt Road end.
Goals (Adel)	5: Jarman; 3: Smart; 2. Vardy; 1. James, Pittman, Johnson, Thiessen, Ricciuto
Goals (North)	1: Blakey, Pike, Abraham, Carey, Roberts, Bell, Allison, Simpson
Best	
Norm Smith Medal	Andrew McLeod - Adelaide
Injuries	
Reports	None
Venue	Melbourne Cricket Ground, Melbourne, VIC
Attendance	94,431
Umpires	Andrew Coates, Hayden Kennedy, Darren Goldspink
Metropolitan Free To Air TV audience	2,524,000 (Nationally)
