= 1998 AFL Grand Final =

Grand final of the 1998 Australian Football League season

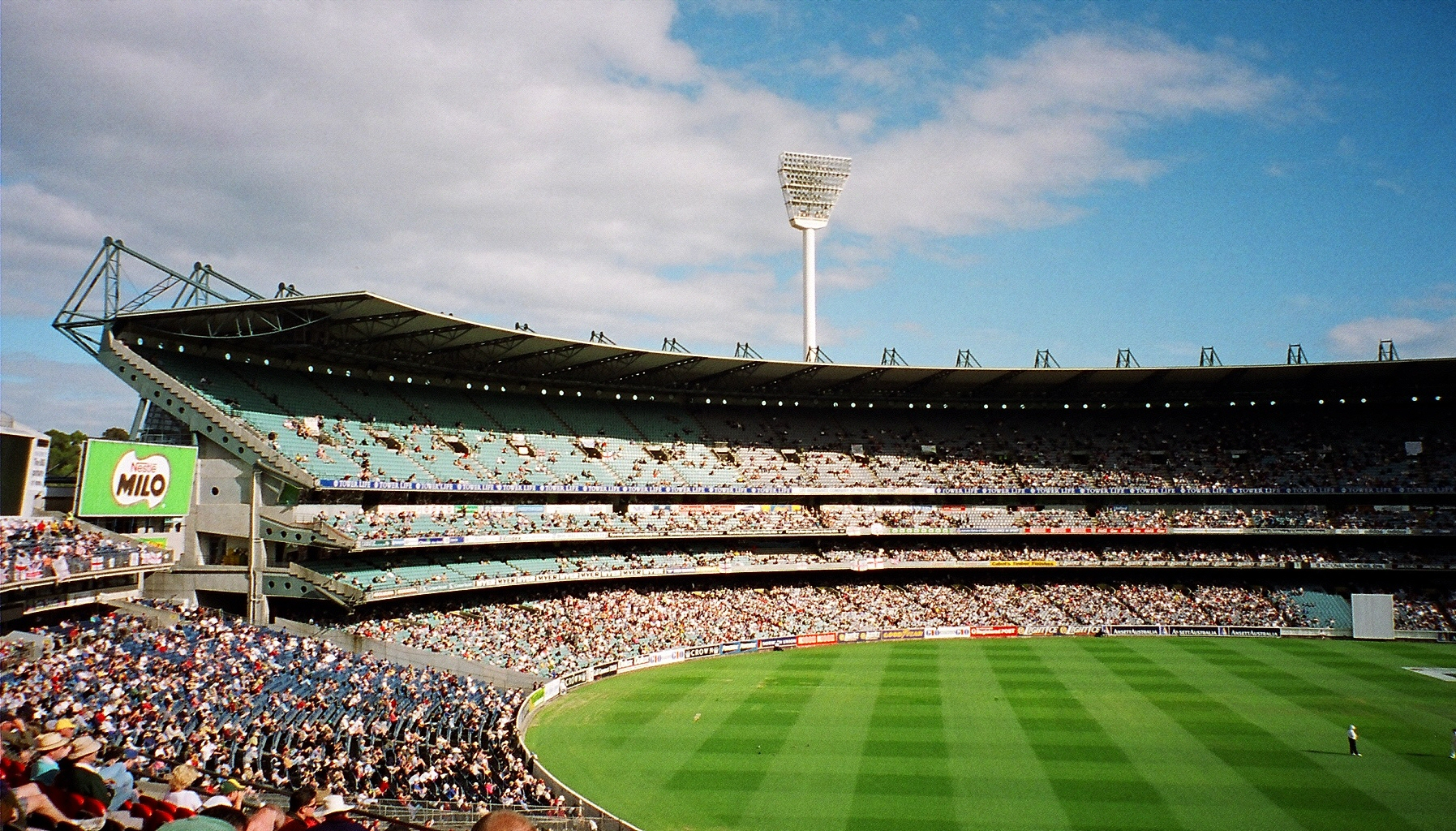
- The Melbourne Cricket Ground, where the 1998 AFL Grand Final took place.

Kangaroos	Adelaide
8.22 (70)	15.15 (105)
	1	2	3	4
KAN	4.4 (28)	6.15 (51)	8.15 (63)	8.22 (70)
ADE	3.2 (20)	4.3 (27)	9.11 (65)	15.15 (105)
- Date: 26 September 1998
- Stadium: Melbourne Cricket Ground
- Attendance: 94,431
- Favourite: Kangaroos
- Umpires: Andrew Coates (6), Hayden Kennedy (7), Darren Goldspink (32)
- Coin toss won by: Kangaroos
- Kicked toward: Punt Road End

Ceremonies
- Pre-match entertainment: Muhammad Ali, Mark Seymour, Rob Guest, Jane Scali and Michael Cormick
- National anthem: Rob Guest

Accolades
- Norm Smith Medallist: Andrew McLeod (Adelaide)
- Jock McHale Medallist: Malcolm Blight

Broadcast in Australia
- Network: Seven Network
- Commentators: Bruce McAvaney (host and commentator); Dennis Cometti (commentator); Sandy Roberts (commentator); Tim Watson (expert commentator); Leigh Matthews (expert commentator); Peter McKenna (“sharp shooter”); Robert DiPierdomenico (boundary rider); Neil Kerley (boundary rider)

The 1998 AFL Grand Final was an Australian rules football game contested between the Adelaide Crows and the North Melbourne Kangaroos, held at the Melbourne Cricket Ground in Melbourne on 26 September 1998. It was the 102nd annual grand final of the Australian Football League (formerly the Victorian Football League), staged to determine the premiers for the 1998 AFL season. The match, attended by 94,431 spectators, was won by Adelaide by a margin of 35 points. This was the second consecutive premiership for the Crows and to date their last premiership win.

== Background ==
This match saw the Kangaroos playing in their second grand final in three years, after their triumph in the 1996 AFL Grand Final. The Crows were competing in their second consecutive grand final, and were seeking back-to-back premierships after winning the 1997 AFL Grand Final. Craig Sholl for the Kangaroos was to play his 200th game.

At the conclusion of the home and away season, North Melbourne had finished first on the AFL ladder with 16 wins and 6 losses, winning the McClelland Trophy. They had won their last nine matches. Adelaide had a less dominant season and finished fifth with 13 wins and 9 losses.

Adelaide fell to a heavy loss in its qualifying final against Melbourne at the MCG by 48 points, but still progressed to play a semi-final against Sydney at the SCG, which they won by 27 points. Adelaide then progressed to the preliminary final against the Western Bulldogs at the MCG, and won convincingly by 68 points.

North Melbourne won its qualifying final against Essendon by 22 points at the MCG, sending them to a home preliminary final against Melbourne. They won that match by 30 points to progress to the grand final. These finals wins extended North Melbourne's winning streak to eleven matches entering the grand final. The Kangaroos entered the game as heavy favourites.

== Match summary ==
	1st	2nd	3rd	Final
Adelaide	3.2 (20)	4.3 (27)	9.11 (65)	15.15 (105)
North Melbourne	4.4 (28)	6.15 (51)	8.15 (63)	8.22 (70)

North Melbourne attacked constantly during the first half, however returned a wasteful 6.15 (51) for the first half to Adelaide's 4.3 (27). They led by just four goals despite having 21 scoring shots to just seven in the first half.

Adelaide then dominated the second half. A wasteful 5.8 to North Melbourne's 2.0 in the third quarter saw Adelaide lead by two points at three-quarter time. Then, Adelaide scored 6.4 in the final quarter, holding North Melbourne (0.7) goalless, to open a comfortable lead, and ultimately win the match by 35 points.

Adelaide became the first team since Hawthorn in 1988–1989 to win back-to-back premierships. In the end, both teams had 30 scoring shots, but the Crows converted at 50% and the Kangaroos at just 26%.

Darren Jarman was sensational with 5 goals and Andrew McLeod was awarded the Norm Smith Medal for being judged the best player afield, for the second straight year. He became only the second player (after Gary Ayres of Hawthorn) to win the medal twice, and the first player to win it in successive years.

Adelaide is one of just three clubs in modern times to have won the premiership after finishing lower than fourth on the premiership ladder after the home-and-away season, and the only club that has finished outside the top four but still won the premiership after losing their first finals game (The Melbourne Football Club won the premiership after finishing sixth after the fourteen-game home-and-away season in 1900, qualifying for the semi-finals after a strong performance in the three-week sectional round robin that followed the home-and-away season; the Western Bulldogs won the premiership after finishing seventh in the home-and-away season in 2016; the Brisbane Lions won the premiership after finishing fifth in the home-and-away season in 2024).

The finals system was changed in AFL season 2000 to the current format, where every club outside the top four has to win every final to progress.

== Pre-match entertainment ==
The 1998 Grand Final pre-match entertainment was particularly notable for the appearance of former World Heavyweight Boxing champion Muhammad Ali, as he did a lap of honour of the ground. Rob Guest performed This Is The Moment as the champion made his way around the ground. Guest later sang the national anthem.

Donna Fisk and Michael Cristian performed "Rock 'N Footy (Rock The G)".

The song performed at every grand final, Waltzing Matilda, was performed by Jane Scali and Michael Cormick.

== Teams ==
Kangaroos	Adelaide

Kangaroos
B:	11 Glenn Archer	4 Mick Martyn	37 Adam Simpson
HB:	28 Byron Pickett	5 Jason McCartney	8 Robert Scott
C:	34 David King	10 Anthony Stevens	15 Winston Abraham
HF:	22 Mark Roberts	18 Wayne Carey (Capt)	13 Martin Pike
F:	29 Brent Harvey	24 Craig Sholl	6 Shannon Grant
Foll:	31 Corey McKernan	12 John Blakey	26 Peter Bell
Int:	33 Brett Allison	16 Matthew Capuano	17 Glenn Freeborn
Int:	3 Anthony Rock		
Coach:	Denis Pagan		

Adelaide
B:	28 Kane Johnson	34 Ben Hart	26 Mark Bickley (Capt)
HB:	7 Nigel Smart	44 Peter Caven	13 Shane Ellen
C:	30 Peter Vardy	36 Simon Goodwin	29 James Thiessen
HF:	23 Andrew McLeod	10 Matthew Robran	11 Brett James
F:	32 Mark Ricciuto	15 David Pittman	9 Tyson Edwards
Foll:	52 Shaun Rehn	3 Darren Jarman	5 Kym Koster
Int:	14 Matthew Connell	19 Mark Stevens	31 Ben Marsh
Int:	33 Andrew Eccles		
Coach:	Malcolm Blight		

== Match details ==
1998 AFL Grand Final
Saturday, 26 September 2:30pm	Kangaroos	def. by	Adelaide	MCG (crowd: 94,431)
4.4 (28); 6.15 (51); 8.15 (63); 8.22 (70)	Q1; Q2; Q3; Final	3.2 (20); 4.3 (27); 9.11 (65); 15.15 (105)	Umpires: Coates (6), Kennedy (7), Goldspink (32); Norm Smith Medal: Andrew McLeod; Television broadcast: Seven Network; National anthem: Rob Guest
Blakey, Pike, Abraham, Carey, Roberts, Bell, Allison, Simpson	Goals	Jarman 5, Smart 3, Vardy 2, James, Pittman, Johnson, Thiessen, Ricciuto
Kangaroos won the coin toss and kicked to the Punt Road end in the first quarter

== See also ==
- 1998 AFL season
- 1998 AFL finals series
- It's the Crows Again song by Steve Dundon.
