= Brendon Lade =

Australian rules footballer, born 1976

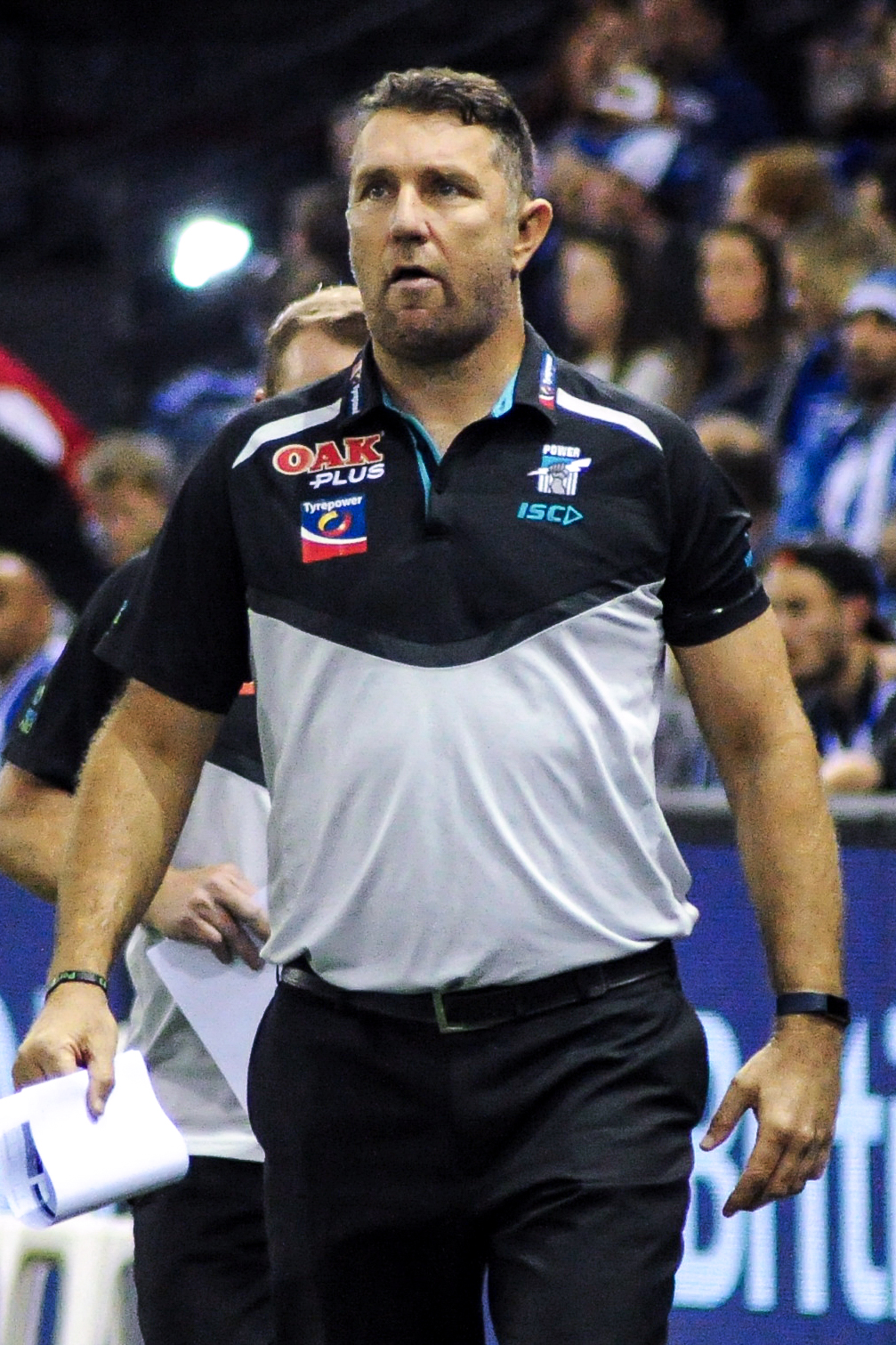
- Lade in April 2018

Personal information
- Full name: Brendon Lade
- Born: 10 July 1976 (age 50); Kangaroo Island, Australia
- Original team: South Adelaide (SANFL)
- Height: 199 cm (6 ft 6 in)
- Weight: 102 kg (225 lb)
- Position: Ruckman

Playing career^{1}
Years	Club	Games (Goals)
1997–2009	Port Adelaide	234 (182)
- ^{1} Playing statistics correct to the end of 2009.

Career highlights
- AFL premiership player: 2004; 2× All-Australian 2006, 2007; John Cahill Medal 2006; AFL Rising Star nominee: 1997; Peter Badcoe VC Medal: 2006

Brendon Lade (born 10 July 1976) is a former Australian rules footballer with the Port Adelaide Football Club in the Australian Football League (AFL). He is currently a senior assistant coach with the Western Bulldogs.

== AFL career ==
=== Early career (1992–1999) ===
Lade was born on Kangaroo Island and grew up playing football for the local Wisanger Football Club, where his father coached the A grade side. At the age of 8 Lade moved to the Wisanger sports club, where he played the remainder of his football until he turned 16. Able to play as both a relieving ruckman and forward, Lade played for South Australian National Football League club South Adelaide before his recruitment to Port Adelaide in the lead up to their inaugural season in the AFL in 1997. Lade made his senior AFL debut for Port Adelaide in Round 1, 1997, Port Adelaide's debut AFL match.

=== Injury (2000–2001) ===
Lade missed just one game in his first three years, before he suffered a serious leg injury in Round 2 of 2000 which sidelined him for the rest of the season and also caused him to miss the entire 2001 AFL season after a re-injury. However, he recovered from these injuries to become one of the best ruckmen in the league.

=== Career high (2004–2009) ===
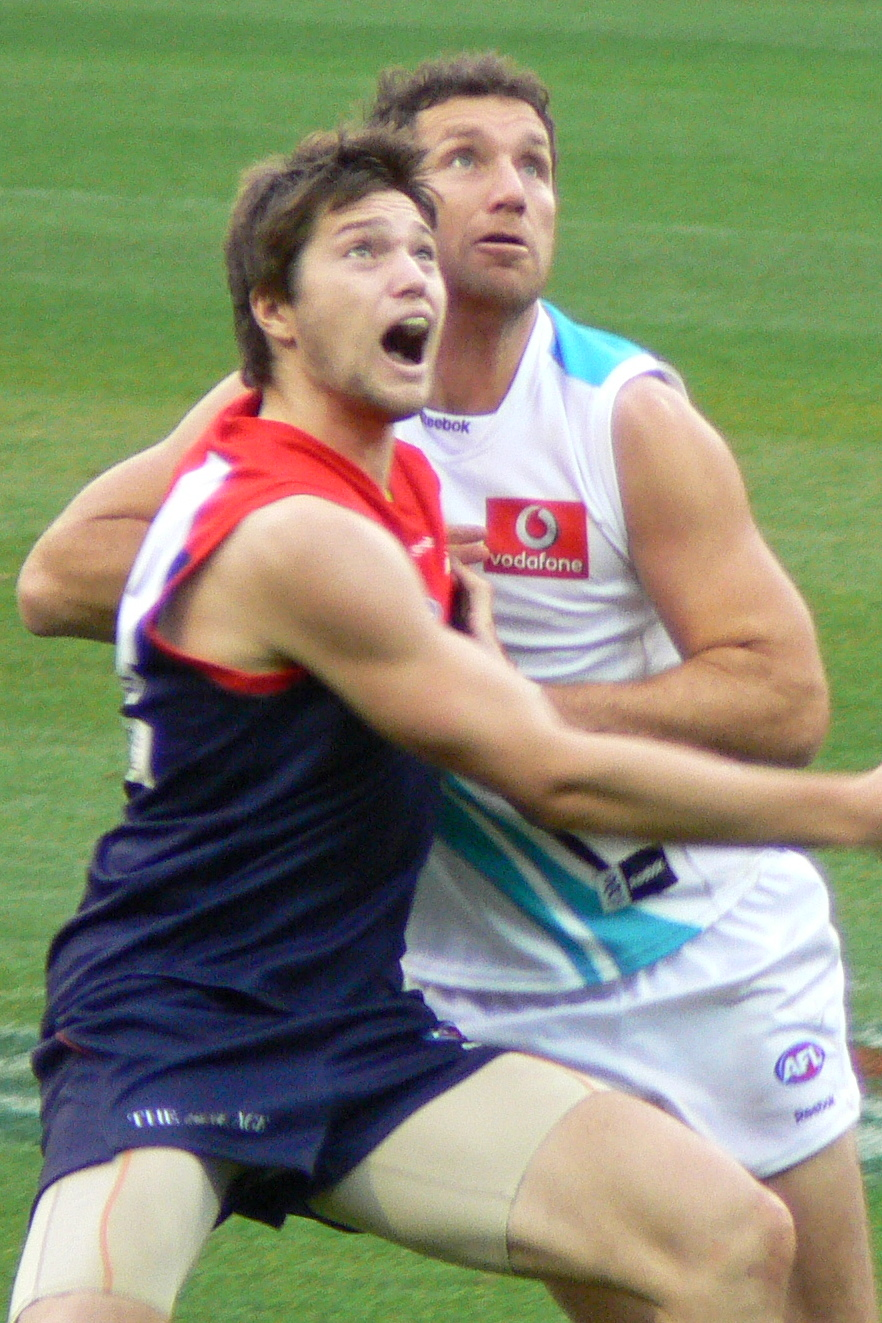
Lade (right) rucking against Melbourne's Stefan Martin in 2009

In 2004 Lade had a great year, leading the club's hitouts statistics in the absence of injured Port Adelaide ruckman Matthew Primus, finishing second in the goalkicking to Warren Tredrea, and capping it off with a premiership medal when Port Adelaide won its first AFL premiership, defeating the Brisbane Lions. In 2006 Lade won All-Australian selection and also took out the John Cahill Medal, Port Adelaide's Best and Fairest. In 2007 Lade continued his career-best form, winning another All-Australia selection, and earning a rare 2 year contract with the Power at 31 years old.

Lade retired at the end of the 2009 season. He and team-mate Peter Burgoyne, the last remaining members of Port Adelaide's inaugural AFL team, both played their final games in Round 22, 2009.

=== Coaching career (2010–present) ===
After ending his 234-game AFL career in 2009, Lade immediately joined Richmond Football Club to become the ruck coach, joining former Port Adelaide teammate Damien Hardwick, Richmond's senior coach. He later became the midfield stoppage coach, and held this position until the end of 2016, after which he returned to Port Adelaide as an assistant coach for the 2017 AFL season. At the end of the 2018 season, Lade returned to Melbourne to become the senior assistant coach for St Kilda Football Club after two seasons as an assistant with Port Adelaide. During the 2022 season, Lade temporarily stepped into the senior coaching chair with St Kilda senior coach Brett Ratten missing due to Coronavirus, leading the Saints to a win over Gold Coast in Round 5. At the end of the 2022 season, Lade joined the Western Bulldogs as an assistant coach.

== Statistics ==
Legend
G	Goals	K	Kicks	D	Disposals	T	Tackles
B	Behinds	H	Handballs	M	Marks	H/O	Hit-outs
#	Played in that season's premiership team

Season	Team	No.	Games	Totals								Averages (per game)							
Season	Team	No.	Games	G	B	K	H	D	M	T	H/O	G	B	K	H	D	M	T	H/O
1997	Port Adelaide	20	22	14	12	156	76	232	98	16	171	0.6	0.5	7.1	3.5	10.5	4.5	0.7	7.8
1998	Port Adelaide	20	22	20	14	182	97	279	115	28	239	0.9	0.6	8.3	4.4	12.7	5.2	1.3	10.9
1999	Port Adelaide	20	21	10	8	167	93	260	100	11	325	0.5	0.4	8.0	4.4	12.4	4.8	0.5	15.5
2000	Port Adelaide	20	2	0	1	3	3	6	3	0	11	0.0	0.5	1.5	1.5	3.0	1.5	0.0	5.5
2001	Port Adelaide	20	0	—	—	—	—	—	—	—	—	—	—	—	—	—	—	—	—
2002	Port Adelaide	5	14	12	6	57	25	82	33	8	139	0.9	0.4	4.1	1.8	5.9	2.4	0.6	9.9
2003	Port Adelaide	5	19	12	4	129	77	206	90	25	272	0.6	0.2	6.8	4.1	10.8	4.7	1.3	14.3
2004^{#}	Port Adelaide	5	24	31	10	156	120	276	110	41	382	1.3	0.4	6.5	5.0	11.5	4.6	1.7	15.9
2005	Port Adelaide	5	24	24	15	160	98	258	112	27	306	1.0	0.6	6.7	4.1	10.8	4.7	1.1	12.8
2006	Port Adelaide	5	22	18	12	253	102	355	187	32	436	0.8	0.5	11.5	4.6	16.1	8.5	1.5	19.8
2007	Port Adelaide	5	25	15	5	207	102	309	131	37	517	0.6	0.2	8.3	4.1	12.4	5.2	1.5	20.7
2008	Port Adelaide	5	17	10	12	121	73	194	91	25	349	0.6	0.7	7.1	4.3	11.4	5.4	1.5	20.5
2009	Port Adelaide	5	22	16	7	142	70	212	97	24	395	0.7	0.3	6.5	3.2	9.6	4.4	1.1	18.0
Career			234	182	106	1733	936	2669	1167	274	3542	0.8	0.5	7.4	4.0	11.4	5.0	1.2	15.1
