= 2004 AFL Grand Final =

Grand final of the 2004 Australian Football League season

- Match program cover

Port Adelaide	Brisbane Lions
17.11 (113)	10.13 (73)
	1	2	3	4
PA	4.5 (29)	6.6 (42)	12.8 (80)	17.11 (113)
BL	2.2 (14)	6.7 (43)	9.9 (63)	10.13 (73)
- Date: 25 September 2004, 2:30pm
- Stadium: Melbourne Cricket Ground
- Attendance: 77,671
- Favourite: Brisbane Lions
- Umpires: #5 Mathew James, #10 Brett Allen, #30 Shane McInerney
- Coin toss won by: Michael Voss (Brisbane Lions)
- Kicked toward: City End

Ceremonies
- Pre-match entertainment: Guy Sebastian, The Ten Tenors, David Hobson & Kath & Kim
- National anthem: Guy Sebastian

Accolades
- Norm Smith Medallist: Byron Pickett (Port Adelaide)
- Jock McHale Medallist: Mark Williams (Port Adelaide)

Broadcast in Australia
- Network: Network Ten
- Commentators: Anthony Hudson (Commentator); Tim Lane (Commentator); Robert Walls (Expert Commentator); Christi Malthouse (Boundary Rider); Andrew Maher (Boundary Rider); Stephen Quartermain (Host); Stephen Silvagni (Analyst); Mick Malthouse (Analyst)

The 2004 AFL Grand Final was an Australian rules football game contested between the Port Adelaide Football Club and the Brisbane Lions, held at the Melbourne Cricket Ground in Melbourne on 25 September 2004. It was the 108th annual grand final of the Australian Football League (formerly the Victorian Football League), staged to determine the premiers for the 2004 AFL season.

The match was won by Port Adelaide, marking that club's maiden AFL premiership victory. It was a closely fought match until midway through the third quarter, when Port Adelaide broke away and went on to win by 40 points. It was attended by 77,671 spectators. It was the first grand final in V/AFL history not to feature a Victorian club.

== Background ==
At the conclusion of the home and away season, Port Adelaide had finished first on the AFL ladder with 17 wins and 5 losses, winning the McClelland Trophy for the third successive year. At the start of the year, Port Adelaide's captain was ruckman Matthew Primus, however he was injured in Round 3 and missed the rest of the season, which meant that forward Warren Tredrea acted as captain. Port Adelaide beat Geelong by 55 points in the qualifying final at AAMI Stadium, which gave them a week off and a place in the preliminary final; Port Adelaide then defeated St Kilda by 6 points in a tight preliminary final to advance to the grand final.

Round-by-round ladder positions of the two teams during the season. View source data.

Brisbane finished second on the ladder with a record of 16 wins and 6 losses. Brisbane thrashed St Kilda by 80 points in the qualifying final at the Gabba, and then defeated Geelong by 9 points in the preliminary final at the Melbourne Cricket Ground – although Brisbane had earned a home preliminary final under the finals system in place, grounds contracts with the Melbourne Cricket Ground required one preliminary final to be staged at the ground, and as the lower-ranked team, Brisbane's was chosen.

It was Brisbane's fourth consecutive Grand Final; and, having won the previous three, was attempting to become the first club to win four consecutive premierships since Collingwood in 1927–30. Port Adelaide was appearing in its first ever AFL Grand Final, having gained a reputation as finals chokers for its previous three seasons – when two minor premierships and a third place home and away finish both ended in lower positions after finals.

The match was played at the Melbourne Cricket Ground, the capacity of which was reduced owing to construction work on the new northern grandstand ahead of the 2006 Commonwealth Games, resulting in the attendance being 77,671. This was the lowest at a grand final attendance since 1991, when it was held at Waverley Park, and the lowest at the MCG since the 1948 Grand Final Replay.

For the first time in VFL/AFL history, both competing grand finalists were clubs based outside the state of Victoria; and until the 2026 Grand Final which featured Brisbane and Fremantle, it was the only grand final featuring two teams who joined the league after 1986 as part of national expansion. In an article for the Herald Sun titled "Our misery is interstate joy – Invaders on the M.C.G.”, Kevin Healey stated that “Victorian footy fans’ worst nightmare finally came true last night – two interstate teams will contest the A.F.L. Grand Final.”

== Match summary ==
Jonathan Brown did not train with the Brisbane Lions players in their warm-up, but he did take to the field at the start of the game.

=== First quarter ===
Leading up to the opening bounce—and for large portions of the first quarter—there were scuffles between players. After Brisbane missed a couple of early shots at goal, Port Adelaide controlled the majority of the quarter, and Josh Carr kicked the first goal on the run after winning a contest at half-forward in the 8th minute. Two more goals soon followed, to Brendon Lade in the 12th minute and Warren Tredrea in the 16th minute to open a 19-point lead. Brisbane fought back through Jason Akermanis, who kicked goals in the 20th and 23rd minutes from long set shots to narrow the margin back to 8. At this point, a vicious brawl broke out between Brisbane full forward Alistair Lynch and Port Adelaide defender Darryl Wakelin; immediately after, Lynch limped off the ground under the blood rule, but also having torn his quadriceps earlier in the quarter, and he played very little part in the rest of the game. Port Adelaide continued to dominate general play throughout the quarter, and with a late goal from a boundary throw-in to Byron Pickett in the 28th minute, Port Adelaide extended its quarter time advantage to a well-deserved 15 points, Port Adelaide 4.5 (29) lead Brisbane 2.2 (14).

=== Second quarter ===
The second quarter continued to be rugged and absorbing. General play started to favour the Lions, but the Lions fell down in the forward line, kicking 0.4 (4) from several chances in the first ten minutes of the quarter; while Port Adelaide capitalised on a reversed free kick against Jason Akermanis in Brisbane's forward line to rebound the length of the ground, finishing with a goal against the run of play to Pickett, extending the Port Adelaide advantage to 19 points.

Brisbane then enjoyed a brief purple patch, kicking four goals in seven minutes to take the lead. The first, to Clark Keating in the 16th minute, came from a solid contested mark in the forward pocket; to Daniel Bradshaw in the 19th minute from a 40m set shot; to Akermanis in the 21st minute, with a snap shot from the boundary line after a boundary throw-in; and finally to Tim Notting in the 22nd minute after he roved a goal square marking contest. Toby Thurstans (Port Adelaide) kicked a steadying goal from a coast-to-coast play in the 26th minute, and Brisbane led the game by one point at half time, Brisbane 6.7 (43) led Port Adelaide 6.6 (42).

=== Third quarter ===
In an even start to the third quarter, Thurstans kicked his second goal in the 2nd minute of the third quarter to regain the lead for Port Adelaide, before Notting kicked two goals on the run in two minutes to regain a six-point lead for Brisbane. Pickett kicked his third goal in the 8th minute after winning a high tackle free kick at centre half-forward; and Daniel Bradshaw kicked another for Brisbane in the 10th minute from a 45m set shot to restore Brisbane's six-point lead. The two teams then settled into a tight arm wrestle, each kicking one behind over the following ten minutes.

Then, Port Adelaide enjoyed a strong end to the quarter, kicking four goals in the final ten minutes of the quarter to open up a three goal lead. Josh Mahoney kicked the first in the 22nd minute after marking 30m from goal; Gavin Wanganeen kicked the second in the 25th minute with a mark from the same position; Shaun Burgoyne kicked the third in the 28th minute after roving a ruck contest in the forward pocket; and Wanganeen kicked the fourth in the 30th minute on the run after marking in the forward pocket. Brisbane had one chance in the final minute, Akermanis missing a snap shot from the pocket, and Port Adelaide led by 17 points at three-quarter time, Port Adelaide 12.8 (80) led Brisbane 9.9 (63).

=== Fourth quarter ===
Mahoney having a very good quarter. Will it carry over the top – For Wanganeen! To put them three goals in front!

They are the winningest team in Australia. The old Port Adelaide have won 36 [SANFL] premierships. Today at the MCG may just be their finest hour.

— Tim Lane calling the last goal of the third quarter on Network Ten.

In the critical opening of the final quarter, Port Adelaide struck quickly, Gavin Wanganeen roving at full forward after Shaun Burgoyne created a turnover to kick his third goal in the second minute; and then Wanganeen again in the sixth minute to kick his fourth goal from 45m in general play. At this stage, Port Adelaide led by 29 points, having kicked six goals – four by Wanganeen – inside fifteen minutes either side of three quarter time. It was a premiership-winning burst against which Brisbane could not recover. Bradshaw kicked a goal in the 9th minute from a turnover to bring the margin back to 22 points, but after Thurstans kicked his third goal in the 13th minute, any Brisbane resistance ended. Port Adelaide kicked two more goals – to Stuart Dew in the 23rd minute and Adam Kingsley in the 25th minute – eventually winning by a comfortable 40 points, Port Adelaide 17.11 (113) d. Brisbane 10.13 (73).

=== Post-match ===
Following the match, Port Adelaide coach Mark Williams was quite animated, his celebrations including a speech on the dais in which he uttered the now-famous words "Allan Scott – you were wrong!", in reference to a comment made by Scott (the major sponsor of the Port Adelaide Football Club at the time), earlier in the 2004 season, that the club could not win a premiership under the coaching of Williams. Williams also made a mock choking gesture by holding his tie above his head like a noose as he stepped onto the arena, a reference to the breaking of Port Adelaide's reputation as "chokers" – which had been acquired after losing in the previous two finals series, despite dominating the home-and-away seasons in those years.

=== Norm Smith Medal ===
Byron Pickett, a premiership-winning defender with North Melbourne in 1999, turned into a match-winning on-baller for the Power, and he capped his day with being awarded the Norm Smith Medal for being judged the best player afield. His match statistics were 19 kicks, 1 handball, 8 marks, 2 tackles, 3 goals and 2 behinds.

Norm Smith Medal voting tally
Position	Player	Club	Total votes	Vote summary
1 (winner)	Byron Pickett	Port Adelaide	10	1, 3, 3, 3, 0
2	Gavin Wanganeen	Port Adelaide	7	3, 0, 0, 1, 3
3	Kane Cornes	Port Adelaide	6	0, 2, 2, 0, 2
4	Peter Burgoyne	Port Adelaide	5	2, 1, 1, 0, 1
5	Roger James	Port Adelaide	2	0, 0, 0, 2, 0

Voter	Role	3 Votes	2 Votes	1 Vote
Digby Beacham	Sunday Times, Perth	Gavin Wanganeen	Peter Burgoyne	Byron Pickett
Roger Vaughan	AAP	Byron Pickett	Kane Cornes	Peter Burgoyne
Clinton Grybas	3AW	Byron Pickett	Kane Cornes	Peter Burgoyne
Michael Turner	K-Rock	Byron Pickett	Roger James	Gavin Wanganeen
Bruce Abernethy	Triple M Adelaide	Gavin Wanganeen	Kane Cornes	Peter Burgoyne

=== Tribunal ===
Alastair Lynch was reported several times for his fight with Darryl Wakelin, and was ultimately suspended for 10 weeks and fined $15,000 – although, as he retired after the game, he did not end up serving the suspension. Lynch later noted that he mentally snapped after having injured his quad early in the game, and that his poor spectacle remains one of his greatest career regrets. Additionally, Jonathan Brown was suspended for five matches and fined $3000 for striking and wrestling with Josh Carr, Simon Black was suspended for a total of three matches on two separate striking charges, Darryl Wakelin was fined $5000 for wrestling with Lynch, and Josh Carr was fined $2400 for wrestling Brown.

Following this game, the AFL introduced doubled tribunal penalties for indiscretions in the grand final, in an attempt to protect the spectacle of the grand final to its global audience. As of 2025, the 2004 incidents remain the last major grand final brawls.

== Teams ==
Port Adelaide	Brisbane Lions

Port Adelaide
B:	21 Michael Wilson	2 Darryl Wakelin	19 Matthew Bishop
HB:	11 Damien Hardwick	35 Chad Cornes	3 Brett Montgomery
C:	22 Josh Mahoney	9 Josh Carr	18 Kane Cornes
HF:	15 Byron Pickett	16 Warren Tredrea (c)	7 Peter Burgoyne
F:	28 Toby Thurstans	5 Brendon Lade	4 Gavin Wanganeen
Foll:	20 Dean Brogan	38 Roger James	8 Shaun Burgoyne
Int:	29 Adam Kingsley	25 Domenic Cassisi	17 Stuart Dew
Int:	6 Jarrad Schofield		
Coach:	Mark Williams		

Brisbane Lions
B:	2 Chris Johnson	15 Mal Michael	33 Darryl White
HB:	22 Chris Scott	23 Justin Leppitsch	5 Brad Scott
C:	12 Jason Akermanis	44 Nigel Lappin	20 Simon Black
HF:	4 Craig McRae	16 Jonathan Brown	13 Martin Pike
F:	36 Daniel Bradshaw	11 Alastair Lynch	30 Robert Copeland
Foll:	27 Clark Keating	3 Michael Voss (c)	6 Luke Power
Int:	25 Dylan McLaren	14 Richard Hadley	8 Tim Notting
Int:	1 Blake Caracella		
Coach:	Leigh Matthews		

== Scorecard ==
2004 AFL Grand Final
Saturday, 25 September (2:30 pm)	Port Adelaide	def.	Brisbane Lions	MCG (crowd: 77,671)
4.5 (29); 6.6 (42); 12.8 (80); 17.11 (113)	Q1; Q2; Q3; Final	2.2 (14); 6.7 (43); 9.9 (63); 10.13 (73)	Umpires: James, Allen, McInerney; Norm Smith Medal: Byron Pickett (Port Adelaide); Television broadcast: Network Ten; National anthem: Guy Sebastian
Wanganeen 4 Pickett, Thurstans 3 S. Burgoyne, Carr, Dew, Kingsley, Lade, Mahoney, Tredrea 1	Goals	3 Akermanis, Bradshaw, Notting; 1 Keating
Pickett, P. Burgoyne, Wanganeen, Thurstans, K. Cornes	Best	Akermanis, Notting, Lappin, Bradshaw
Wakelin – Attempting to strike and wrestling Lynch; Carr – 2× wrestling	Reports	Lynch – Seven offences against Wakelin; Brown – Striking and wrestling Carr; Black – 2× striking
This was Port Adelaide's first premiership in the AFL.

== Media coverage ==
=== Radio ===
Station	Region	Play-by-play commentators	Analysts and boundary riders
Triple M	National	James Brayshaw; Brian Taylor	Sam Newman; Jason Dunstall
3AW	Melbourne, Victoria	Clinton Grybas; Rex Hunt	Gerard Healy; Terry Wallace; Robert Dipierdomenico
5AA	Adelaide, South Australia	KG Cunningham; Chris Dittmar	Russell Ebert
ABC	National	Dan Lonergan; Drew Morphett	Stephen Williams; Mark Maclure; Stan Alves; Caroline Wilson? Peter Brookby

== See also ==
- AFL Grand Final
- 2004 AFL season
