= Michael Wilson (Australian footballer) =

Australian rules footballer (born 1976)

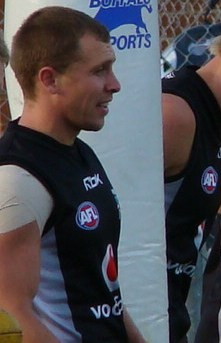

Personal information
- Nickname: Wilbur
- Born: 21 November 1976 (age 49)
- Original team: Port Adelaide (SANFL)
- Height: 179 cm (5 ft 10 in)
- Weight: 89 kg (196 lb)

Playing career^{1}
Years	Club	Games (Goals)
1995–1996, 2003	Port Adelaide (SANFL)	42 (10)
1997–2008	Port Adelaide (AFL)	192 (51)
Total		234 (61)

Representative team honours
Years	Team	Games (Goals)
1997	South Australia	1 (1)
- ^{1} Playing statistics correct to the end of 2008.

Career highlights
- 2× Port Adelaide SANFL premiership player; 1× AFL (2004); 2× SANFL (1995, 1996); Port Adelaide vice-captain (2006–2007); AFL Rising Star: 1997

Michael Robert Wilson (born 21 November 1976) is a former professional Australian rules footballer who played for Port Adelaide Football Club in the Australian Football League (AFL) and the South Australian National Football League (SANFL)

== AFL career ==
=== Success (1997–2006) ===
Affectionately known as 'Wilbur', Wilson was one of the talented crop of youngsters making the transition from the SANFL to the national league as part of Port Adelaide's inaugural AFL squad in 1997. Playing primarily as an onballer Wilson immediately made an impression and took out the 1997 AFL Rising Star award as the league's best young prospect in his debut season. From 1998 onward, Wilson played primarily as a medium-sized defender rotating through the midfield on occasion.

With a pair of SANFL premiership medallions already in his keeping by age 19, Wilson was able to add the AFL equivalent in 2004, capping a season with a sturdy performance in Port Adelaide's first AFL flag win over the thrice reigning premiers, the Brisbane Lions. His high level of play was all the more remarkable given he had required a double shoulder reconstruction for some time.

=== Injury and retirement (2007–2008) ===
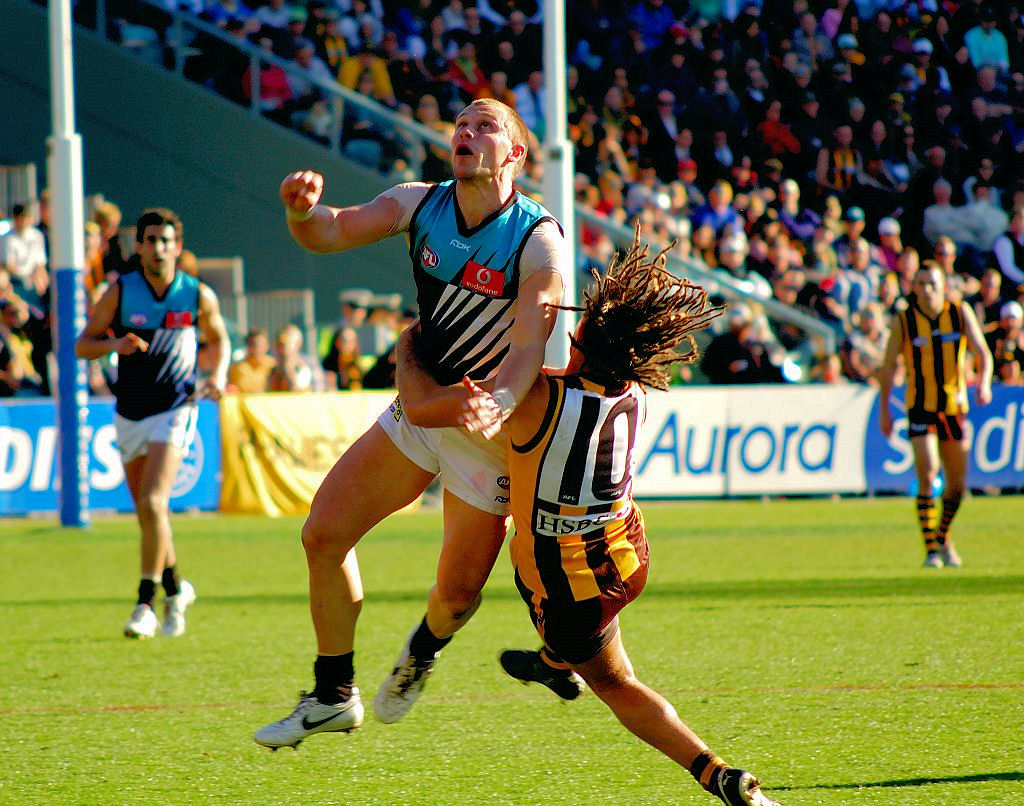
Michael Wilson during a match against Hawthorn in 2007.

Despite shoulder problems and further injuries, including two knee reconstructions,[3] Wilson remained part of the Port Adelaide side for another decade.

In 2007 Wilson snapped his achilles tendon in Port's win over North Melbourne in the Preliminary Final and missed the Grand Final against Geelong.

Wilson announced his retirement from AFL football on 5 August 2008.

== Playing statistics ==
Legend
G	Goals	K	Kicks	D	Disposals	T	Tackles
B	Behinds	H	Handballs	M	Marks

Season	Team	No.	Games	Totals							Averages (per game)						
Season	Team	No.	Games	G	B	K	H	D	M	T	G	B	K	H	D	M	T
1997	Port Adelaide	15	22	13	11	270	149	419	58	37	0.6	0.5	12.3	6.8	19.0	2.6	1.7
1998	Port Adelaide	15	21	8	5	221	120	341	68	39	0.4	0.2	10.5	5.7	16.2	3.2	1.9
1999	Port Adelaide	15	23	3	4	191	101	292	63	26	0.1	0.2	8.3	4.4	12.7	2.7	1.1
2000	Port Adelaide	15	21	6	2	198	88	286	47	38	0.3	0.1	9.4	4.2	13.6	2.2	1.8
2001	Port Adelaide	15	11	3	1	91	61	152	28	20	0.3	0.1	8.3	5.5	13.8	2.5	1.8
2002	Port Adelaide	15	0	—	—	—	—	—	—	—	—	—	—	—	—	—	—
2003	Port Adelaide	21	15	2	1	104	60	164	54	31	0.1	0.1	6.9	4.0	10.9	3.6	2.1
2004	Port Adelaide	21	23	9	8	228	167	395	93	62	0.4	0.3	9.9	7.3	17.2	4.0	2.7
2005	Port Adelaide	21	16	0	2	142	89	231	65	41	0.0	0.1	8.9	5.6	14.4	4.1	2.6
2006	Port Adelaide	21	16	3	4	120	80	200	68	33	0.2	0.3	7.5	5.0	12.5	4.3	2.1
2007	Port Adelaide	21	19	4	1	161	121	282	83	42	0.2	0.1	8.5	6.4	14.8	4.4	2.2
2008	Port Adelaide	21	5	0	0	37	22	59	13	8	0.0	0.0	7.4	4.4	11.8	2.6	1.6
Career			192	51	39	1763	1058	2821	640	377	0.3	0.2	9.2	5.5	14.7	3.3	2.0
