= Roger James (footballer) =

Australian rules footballer, born 1975

Personal information
- Born: 21 October 1975 (age 51)
- Original team: Norwood (SANFL)
- Debut: Round 5, 27 April 1997, Port Adelaide vs. Brisbane Lions, at Football Park

Playing career^{1}
Years	Club	Games (Goals)
1997–2005	Port Adelaide	147 (87)
- ^{1} Playing statistics correct to the end of 2005.

Career highlights
- Norwood premiership team, 1997 (SANFL); Port Adelaide premiership team, 2004 (AFL)

Roger James (born 21 October 1975) is a former Australian rules footballer who played for Port Adelaide Football Club in the Australian Football League (AFL).

James debuted during Port Adelaide's inaugural AFL season and made a name for himself as a tough midfielder. The brother of former Adelaide Crows player Brett James, Roger displayed immense talent throughout his career.

After suffering a succession of groin injuries throughout the 2003 AFL season, James returned early in the 2004 AFL season, playing every game from Round Seven onwards, and was one of the best players during Port Adelaide's maiden premiership win that year.

In 2005 things took a turn for the worse though, with James' knee cartilage deteriorating in condition after Round 18, limiting him to only 10 games for the season.

In late August 2005 Port Adelaide announced that due to the condition of the knee they would not be offering James a contract for the 2006 AFL season and on medical advice, James was forced to retire at only 29 years of age – "I’ve spoken to a couple of doctors and they’ve advised me that it is in my best interests to give football away now so that further down the track I’ll be able to live a normal life", he said.

== Playing statistics ==
Legend
G	Goals	K	Kicks	D	Disposals	T	Tackles
B	Behinds	H	Handballs	M	Marks

Season	Team	No.	Games	Totals							Averages (per game)						
Season	Team	No.	Games	G	B	K	H	D	M	T	G	B	K	H	D	M	T
1997	Port Adelaide	38	17	5	9	147	84	231	49	9	0.3	0.5	8.6	4.9	13.6	2.9	0.5
1998	Port Adelaide	38	6	5	2	37	31	68	14	7	0.8	0.3	6.2	5.2	11.3	2.3	1.2
1999	Port Adelaide	38	10	5	1	69	40	109	24	9	0.5	0.1	6.9	4.0	10.9	2.4	0.9
2000	Port Adelaide	38	20	17	15	230	164	394	73	41	0.9	0.8	11.5	8.2	19.7	3.7	2.1
2001	Port Adelaide	38	24	19	9	241	200	441	122	35	0.8	0.4	10.0	8.3	18.4	5.1	1.5
2002	Port Adelaide	38	24	13	6	244	192	436	86	54	0.5	0.3	10.2	8.0	18.2	3.6	2.3
2003	Port Adelaide	38	17	12	6	219	108	327	76	38	0.7	0.4	12.9	6.4	19.2	4.5	2.2
2004	Port Adelaide	38	19	9	6	212	141	353	58	52	0.5	0.3	11.2	7.4	18.6	3.1	2.7
2005	Port Adelaide	38	10	2	3	82	47	129	35	19	0.2	0.3	8.2	4.7	12.9	3.5	1.9
Career			147	87	57	1481	1007	2488	537	264	0.6	0.4	10.1	6.9	16.9	3.7	1.8
