= Brett James (footballer) =

Australian rules footballer (born 1972)

Personal information
- Full name: Brett James
- Born: 15 December 1972 (age 53)
- Original team: Norwood
- Height: 176 cm (5 ft 9 in)
- Weight: 77 kg (170 lb)

Playing career^{1}
Years	Club	Games (Goals)
1994–1996	Collingwood	42 (26)
1997–2000	Adelaide	76 (26)
Total		118 (52)
- ^{1} Playing statistics correct to the end of 2000.

Career highlights
- 2× AFL Premiership player (1997, 1998); South Australian Football Hall of Fame (2015 inductee)

Brett James (born 15 December 1972) is a former professional Australian rules footballer who played for the Collingwood Football Club and Adelaide Football Club in the Australian Football League (AFL).

In 2015, James was inducted into the South Australian Football Hall of Fame.

== Early career ==
James joined Norwood from Kersbrook from the Hills Football League in 1990. In the 1992 AFL draft Brett James was selected by Collingwood at pick 31, and would be joined by Norwood teammate Scott Burns who was selected at pick 90.

== AFL career ==
James joined Collingwood in 1994, a year after he was drafted. James would only play three seasons with Collingwood, often as a bench warmer and he was traded to Adelaide.

James was recruited by Adelaide to add depth to their list, often coming off the bench or playing back pocket. He played 17 games in his first season, including coming off the bench in the 1997 AFL Grand Final. After winning the grand final for Adelaide, James completed the unusual feat of winning two premierships in a week as he was also a part of the Norwood team that won the 1997 SANFL flag. James then developed into a valuable player for Adelaide as he was a part of the 1998 premiership. In 1999, James played every game but only played 14 games in 2000 and he was delisted.

== Playing statistics ==
Legend
G	Goals	K	Kicks	D	Disposals	T	Tackles
B	Behinds	H	Handballs	M	Marks

Season	Team	No.	Games	Totals							Averages (per game)						
Season	Team	No.	Games	G	B	K	H	D	M	T	G	B	K	H	D	M	T
1994	Collingwood	8	17	15	6	43	57	100	19	24	0.9	0.4	2.5	3.4	5.9	1.1	1.4
1995	Collingwood	8	15	9	7	82	99	181	17	25	0.6	0.5	5.5	6.6	12.1	1.1	1.7
1996	Collingwood	8	10	2	2	40	82	122	23	20	0.2	0.2	4.0	8.2	12.2	2.3	2.0
1997	Adelaide	11	17	3	3	126	154	280	23	38	0.2	0.2	7.4	9.1	16.5	1.4	2.2
1998	Adelaide	11	23	15	8	191	228	419	55	42	0.7	0.3	8.3	9.9	18.2	2.4	1.8
1999	Adelaide	11	22	2	10	181	210	391	57	20	0.1	0.5	8.2	9.5	17.8	2.6	0.9
2000	Adelaide	11	14	6	2	79	118	197	37	11	0.4	0.1	5.6	8.4	14.1	2.6	0.8
Career			118	52	38	742	948	1690	231	180	0.4	0.3	6.3	8.0	14.3	2.0	1.5

== Post-AFL ==
James continued playing with Norwood in 2002 and played there until 2006. Brett played a total of 219 premiership games for Norwood from 1990 to 1993 and 1997–2006. James also kicked 58 goals, was captain from 2002 to 2006, and won the best and fairest three times. Nowadays he works on his Kersbrook farm with his brother Roger, who also won the premiership in 1997 with Norwood alongside Brett and also with Port Adelaide in 2004. James also is captain coach of Kersbrook in the Hills Football League.
