= David Pittman =

Australian rules footballer, born 1969

Personal information
- Full name: David Pittman
- Born: 23 February 1969 (age 57)
- Original team: Norwood (SANFL)
- Height: 202 cm (6 ft 8 in)
- Weight: 98 kg (15 st 6 lb; 216 lb)
- Position: Ruckman / centre half-back

Playing career^{1}
Years	Club	Games (Goals)
1992–1999	Adelaide	131 (34)
- ^{1} Playing statistics correct to the end of 1999.

Career highlights
- 2× AFL premiership player (1997, 1998); Adelaide Team of the Decade — interchange; 5 State of Origin games for South Australia

David Pittman (born 23 February 1969) is a former Australian rules footballer who played for the Adelaide Crows in the Australian Football League (AFL).

Originally from South Australian National Football League (SANFL) club Norwood, Pittman was drafted by Essendon in the 1989 VFL Draft but played no games for them. He was traded to Adelaide in 1991 and made his AFL debut with Adelaide in 1992, playing as a ruckman.

Pittman is sometimes remembered for an incident early in the 1997 AFL season where Adelaide coach Malcolm Blight labelled his effort "pathetic" after a game at the MCG in Melbourne. The 1997 season turned out to be one of Pittman's most successful as he moved between centre half-back and the ruck playing an important part in the Crows' premiership side that year.

Pittman also played in the 1998 AFL Grand Final, winning his second premiership. At the end of 1999, Pittman retired having played 131 games for 34 goals and 5 games for South Australia.

== Statistics ==
Legend
G	Goals	K	Kicks	D	Disposals	T	Tackles
B	Behinds	H	Handballs	M	Marks	H/O	Hit-outs

Season	Team	No.	Games	Totals								Averages (per game)							
Season	Team	No.	Games	G	B	K	H	D	M	T	H/O	G	B	K	H	D	M	T	H/O
1992	Adelaide	15	1	0	0	1	3	4	1	0	13	0.0	0.0	1.0	3.0	4.0	1.0	0.0	13.0
1993	Adelaide	15	17	1	1	51	95	146	43	17	130	0.1	0.1	3.0	5.6	8.6	2.5	1.0	7.6
1994	Adelaide	15	20	1	2	78	85	163	61	12	69	0.1	0.1	3.9	4.3	8.2	3.1	0.6	3.5
1995	Adelaide	15	18	9	2	117	116	233	59	20	307	0.5	0.1	6.5	6.4	12.9	3.3	1.1	17.1
1996	Adelaide	15	19	8	8	119	132	251	83	10	338	0.4	0.4	6.3	6.9	13.2	4.4	0.5	17.8
1997	Adelaide	15	23	4	7	149	89	238	65	13	317	0.2	0.3	6.5	3.9	10.3	2.8	0.6	13.8
1998	Adelaide	15	18	5	4	75	59	134	36	10	229	0.3	0.2	4.2	3.3	7.4	2.0	0.6	12.7
1999	Adelaide	15	15	6	4	90	56	146	45	3	262	0.4	0.3	6.0	3.7	9.7	3.0	0.2	17.5
Career			131	34	28	680	635	1315	393	85	1665	0.3	0.2	5.2	4.8	10.0	3.0	0.6	12.7
