= Nigel Smart =

Australian rules footballer, born 1969

Personal information
- Full name: Nigel Smart
- Born: 21 May 1969 (age 57)
- Original teams: Christies Beach (SFL); South Adelaide (SANFL)
- Height: 188 cm (6 ft 2 in)
- Weight: 91 kg (14 st 5 lb; 201 lb)

Playing career^{1}
Years	Club	Games (Goals)
1988–1992, 2004	South Adelaide	78 (29)
1991–2004	Adelaide	278 (116)
Total		356 (145)

Representative team honours
Years	Team	Games (Goals)
- South Australia
- ^{1} Playing statistics correct to the end of 2004.

Career highlights
- Club: 2× AFL premiership player (1997, 1998); 3× All-Australian 1991, 1993, 1998; Adelaide Team of the Decade - Half back flank; Adelaide Football Club Hall Of Fame; Representative: National Football Carnival Championship: 1993

Nigel James Smart (born 21 May 1969) is a former Australian rules footballer who played for the Adelaide Football Club in the Australian Football League (AFL). Smart played as a defender, and he was part of Adelaide's inaugural team in the 1991 AFL season. He was a two-time premiership player, a three-time All-Australian, and the first person to play 250 matches for Adelaide.

Following his retirement, he worked in football administration. He was the Adelaide Football Club's chief operating officer from 2013 to 2020 and was part of the club's decision to move into eSports.

== Early life ==
Smart was raised in the southern suburbs of Adelaide, South Australia. He studied a Bachelor of Arts at Flinders University, majoring in geography and politics.

Smart made his senior football debut in 1988 while at university, playing for South Adelaide in the SANFL.

== AFL career ==
Smart was in the Adelaide Football Club's squad for their inaugural season in 1991. Smart was named at full-back for Adelaide's Round One match against Hawthorn, lining up against Hawthorn's full-forward Jason Dunstall. During the match, Smart had six kicks and nine handballs and took six marks. At the end of the 1991 season, Smart became Adelaide's first ever All-Australian, selected in the back pocket.

During the 1992 pre-season, Adelaide went on a pre-season camp in Rapid Bay. As part of the camp, a motivational speaker encouraged the players to walk over hot coals for each other. Smart was the first to do so, and suffered blisters and first-degree burns on the soles of his feet. Bob Hammond, the club's chairman, was present, and after seeing Smart's injuries from walking over the coals he called off the exercise. Smart recovered from the burns and played in a practice match less than a week later.

Smart was one of the key players in Adelaide's resurgence under coach Malcolm Blight. He was the team's vice captain (with Mark Bickley as the team's captain) in 1997 and 1998, when the team won back-to-back premierships. In the 1997 AFL Grand Final against St Kilda, he kicked the final goal of the match as Adelaide won their first AFL premiership. He also played in Adelaide's win in the 1998 AFL Grand Final, when the Crows became the first team to win back-to-back premierships since the competition was renamed to the AFL in 1990.

In the first part of Smart's career, he was not a full-time footballer. Through the Crows' premiership years, Smart trained with the teams three times a week and spent most of his time at day jobs to supplement his income. He worked in sales and management, first for South Australian Brewing Company, then for Toyota. Smart retired from football at the end of the 2004 AFL season.

=== AFL statistics ===
Legend
G	Goals	K	Kicks	D	Disposals	T	Tackles
B	Behinds	H	Handballs	M	Marks

Season	Team	No.	Games	Totals							Averages (per game)						
Season	Team	No.	Games	G	B	K	H	D	M	T	G	B	K	H	D	M	T
1991	Adelaide	7	20	2	1	139	123	262	47	28	0.1	0.1	7.0	6.2	13.1	2.4	1.4
1992	Adelaide	7	17	0	2	131	109	240	35	31	0.0	0.1	7.7	6.4	14.1	2.1	1.8
1993	Adelaide	7	22	23	17	220	136	356	81	38	1.0	0.8	10.0	6.2	16.2	3.7	1.7
1994	Adelaide	7	17	13	19	123	87	210	56	22	0.8	1.1	7.2	5.1	12.4	3.3	1.3
1995	Adelaide	7	22	14	6	189	152	341	59	49	0.6	0.3	8.6	6.9	15.5	2.7	2.2
1996	Adelaide	7	22	7	8	208	116	324	55	57	0.3	0.4	9.5	5.3	14.7	2.5	2.6
1997	Adelaide	7	22	13	8	253	88	341	84	47	0.6	0.4	11.5	4.0	15.5	3.8	2.1
1998	Adelaide	7	24	13	12	304	122	426	88	80	0.5	0.5	12.7	5.1	17.8	3.7	3.3
1999	Adelaide	7	21	12	10	217	117	334	69	30	0.6	0.5	10.3	5.6	15.9	3.3	1.4
2000	Adelaide	7	18	3	1	178	115	293	58	28	0.2	0.1	9.9	6.4	16.3	3.2	1.6
2001	Adelaide	7	23	7	11	223	133	356	78	43	0.3	0.5	9.7	5.8	15.5	3.4	1.9
2002	Adelaide	7	23	3	3	150	109	259	63	44	0.1	0.1	6.5	4.7	11.3	2.7	1.9
2003	Adelaide	7	21	3	5	133	125	258	57	36	0.1	0.2	6.3	6.0	12.3	2.7	1.7
2004	Adelaide	7	6	3	1	35	21	56	14	11	0.5	0.2	5.8	3.5	9.3	2.3	1.8
Career			278	0.4	0.4	2503	1553	4056	844	544	131	116	9.0	5.6	14.6	3.0	2.0

== After AFL ==
After his retirement from football, Smart lived for a period of time in Canada and France. He returned to Adelaide, and was an unsuccessful candidate for the Liberal Party for the electoral district of Norwood in the 2006 South Australian state election. After his failure in the election, he worked for a disability organisation called Disability Works, then returned to university to study a Master of Business Administration at the University of Adelaide.

Upon retiring from football, Smart also became a member of the Adelaide Football Club's board of directors in 2005. He served as deputy chairman to Bill Sanders in 2009 and in 2013 became the club's chief operating officer. In 2017, he was part of the club's decision to enter into eSports, which became a source of sponsorship for the club. Smart ceased working at the club in 2020.

In August 2021, Smart became the chief executive officer of Crime Stoppers South Australia.
