= It's the Crows Again =

Single by Steve Dundon
- Released: 1998
- Venue: Alleycat Recording Studios
- Length: 3:29
- Label: Alleycat Records
- Songwriters: Steve Dundon, Harvey Silver, Gary Adams, Des Dowling, Darren Sanicki

"It's the Crows Again" is the debut and only single by Australian singer Steve Dundon. The song was released following the Adelaide Football Club's back to back AFL Premierships in 1997 and 1998. The uses the melody of Willie Nelson's "On the Road Again". The song peaked at number 43 on the ARIA charts.

== Track listing ==
1. "It's The Crows Again" - 2:25
2. "Not The Crows Again (Victoria's Plea)" - 1:47
3. "Live & Kicking Theme" - 0:43
4. "Pride of South Australia" - 1:52

== Charts ==
Chart (1998)	Peak position
Australia (ARIA)	43
