= Peter Vardy (footballer) =

Australian rules footballer

Personal information
- Full name: Peter Vardy
- Born: 26 January 1976 (age 50)
- Original team: Central District (SANFL)
- Height: 181 cm (5 ft 11 in)
- Weight: 83 kg (183 lb)
- Position: Forward

Playing career^{1}
Years	Club	Games (Goals)
1996–2001	Adelaide	96 (150)
2002–2004	Melbourne	41 (56)
Total		137 (206)
- ^{1} Playing statistics correct to the end of 2004.

Career highlights
- AFL premiership player (1998); AFL Rising Star nominee (1997)

Peter Vardy (born 26 January 1976) is a former Australian rules footballer who played with the Adelaide Football Club and Melbourne Football Club in the Australian Football League (AFL).

A small forward, Vardy started his career at Adelaide where he was an AFL Rising Star nominee in 1997. A key member on the forward flank for the team, he broke his collarbone in the semi-final against Geelong, but managed to kick an extremely important goal in the process while riding a rough collision. This meant he was unable to participate in the last two finals of the Crows' first premiership. The following season he enjoyed another stellar year, accumulating 44 goals and being involved a premiership as the Crows won another premiership, kicking two goals from the wing in the grand final.

Vardy established himself as one of the league's most dangerous running forwards with regular consistent performances, however he fell out of favour with then-Adelaide coach Gary Ayres and at the end of 2001 was traded to Melbourne for draft pick number 56.

== Playing statistics ==
Legend
G	Goals	K	Kicks	D	Disposals	T	Tackles
B	Behinds	H	Handballs	M	Marks

Season	Team	No.	Games	Totals							Averages (per game)						
Season	Team	No.	Games	G	B	K	H	D	M	T	G	B	K	H	D	M	T
1996	Adelaide	30	7	5	4	53	18	71	18	8	0.7	0.6	7.6	2.6	10.1	2.6	1.1
1997	Adelaide	30	24	28	21	216	90	306	74	39	1.2	0.9	9.0	3.8	12.8	3.1	1.6
1998	Adelaide	30	18	44	23	163	67	230	58	32	2.4	1.3	9.1	3.7	12.8	3.2	1.8
1999	Adelaide	30	11	16	13	88	35	123	41	6	1.5	1.2	8.0	3.2	11.2	3.7	0.5
2000	Adelaide	30	20	39	17	140	58	198	52	19	2.0	0.9	7.0	2.9	9.9	2.6	1.0
2001	Adelaide	30	16	18	21	121	46	167	52	28	1.1	1.3	7.6	2.9	10.4	3.3	1.8
2002	Melbourne	19	21	39	31	151	72	223	77	32	1.9	1.5	7.2	3.4	10.6	3.7	1.5
2003	Melbourne	19	9	5	9	43	40	83	22	18	0.6	1.0	4.8	4.4	9.2	2.4	2.0
2004	Melbourne	19	11	12	16	70	36	106	35	14	1.1	1.5	6.4	3.3	9.6	3.2	1.3
Career			137	206	155	1045	462	1507	429	196	1.5	1.1	7.6	3.4	11.0	3.1	1.4
