= Tony Thiessen =

Australian rules footballer (1942–2019)

Personal information
- Full name: Anthony Thiessen
- Born: 25 May 1942
- Died: 3 September 2019 (aged 77)
- Original team: Sandy Bay (TANFL)
- Height: 183 cm (6 ft 0 in)
- Weight: 82 kg (181 lb)

Playing career^{1}
Years	Club	Games (Goals)
1963	Melbourne	7 (2)
1964	Carlton	13 (7)
1965	North Melbourne	4 (0)
Total		24 (9)
- ^{1} Playing statistics correct to the end of 1965.

Anthony Thiessen (25 May 1942 – 3 September 2019) was an Australian rules footballer who played with Melbourne, Carlton and North Melbourne in the Victorian Football League (VFL).

Thiessen was a key forward, recruited to Melbourne from Sandy Bay. He made seven appearances in the 1963 VFL season and was then delisted, missing out on a chance to be part of Melbourne's 1964 premiership. After playing for Carlton in 1964, he was cleared to North Melbourne where he would be used as a midfielder. It was his only year at North Melbourne, which gave him the unusual distinction of having played with three separate clubs in a three-season career. He also played with the Waverley Football Club, in the Victorian Football Association.

James Thiessen, his son, was a member of Adelaide's 1998 AFL premiership team.
