= Stefan Carey =

Australian rules footballer

Personal information
- Born: 25 January 1976 (age 50)
- Original team: Pennant Hills (Sydney)
- Height: 197 cm (6 ft 6 in)
- Weight: 104 kg (229 lb)

Playing career^{1}
| Years | Club | Games (Goals) |
| 1996–1999 | Sydney Swans | 45 (22) |
| 2000 | Brisbane Lions | 3 (1) |
| Total | | 48 (23) |
- ^{1} Playing statistics correct to the end of 2000.

Career highlights
- AFL Rising Star runner up: 1997

Stefan Carey (born 25 January 1976) is a former Australian rules footballer who played with the Sydney Swans and Brisbane Lions in the Australian Football League (AFL). He was runner-up in the Norwich Rising Star in 1997. His father George played five games with Fitzroy in 1966.

After just 18 months of playing Australian Rules for Pennant Hills, Stefan was selected in the All Australian Teal cup side in 1993. He was drafted to the Sydney Swans at the end of that year and played reserves during the 1994 season. In 1995, groin and pelvis surgery cut short his season. Stefan played his first senior match, Round 6, 1996 against Essendon where the match ended in a draw. In 1997, Stefan played 20 games including a State of Origin match again Western Australia. He earned 3 Brownlow medal votes against Collingwood in Round 9 after a breakout performance with 11 marks. He kicked 5 goals playing Centre-Half forward against West Coast in Round 16. Carey broke his leg in 1998 and had persistent back and groin issues in 1999 before being traded to Brisbane for the 2000 season where he played the first three games before fracturing his shoulder. He retired at the end of 2000.
