= 1997 AFL Rising Star =

Australian rules football award

1997 Norwich AFL Rising Star
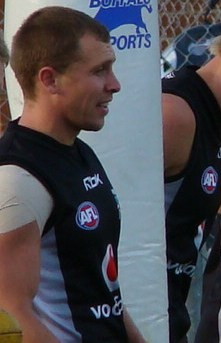
- Michael Wilson, winner of the 1997 AFL Rising Star award
- Sponsored by: Norwich
- Country: Australia
- Rising Star: Michael Wilson (Port Adelaide)

The Norwich AFL Rising Star award is given annually to a standout young player in the Australian Football League. The 1997 medal was won by Port Adelaide player Michael Wilson.

== Eligibility ==
Every round, an Australian Football League rising star nomination is given to a standout young player. To be eligible for the award, a player must be under 21 on 1 January of that year, have played 10 or fewer senior games and not been suspended during the season. At the end of the year, one of the 22 nominees is the winner of award.

== Nominations ==
Round	Player	Club
1	Lance Whitnall	Carlton
2	Joel Bowden	Richmond
3	Bowen Lockwood	Port Adelaide
4	Michael Wilson	Port Adelaide
5	Heath Black	Fremantle
6	Adam Houlihan	Geelong
7	Brendon Lade	Port Adelaide
8	Daniel Bradshaw	Brisbane Lions
9	Stefan Carey	Sydney
10	Shane Woewodin	Melbourne
11	Troy Cook	Sydney
12	Kane Johnson	Adelaide
13	Blake Caracella	Essendon
14	Michael Braun	West Coast
15	Peter Vardy	Adelaide
16	Carl Steinfort	Geelong
17	Brad Scott	Hawthorn
18	Mal Michael	Collingwood
19	Michael Gardiner	West Coast
20	Robert Powell	Richmond
21	Nathan Eagleton	Port Adelaide
22	Angelo Lekkas	Hawthorn
Source: AFL Record Season Guide 2015

== Final voting ==
	Player	Club	Votes
1	Michael Wilson	Port Adelaide	27
2	Blake Caracella	Essendon	15
2	Stefan Carey	Sydney	15
4	Joel Bowden	Richmond	10
5	Daniel Bradshaw	Brisbane Lions	7
5	Peter Vardy	Adelaide	7
7	Troy Cook	Sydney	3
7	Michael Gardiner	West Coast	3
9	Shane Woewodin	Melbourne	2
10	Brendon Lade	Port Adelaide	1
Source: AFL Record Season Guide 2015
