= Toby Thurstans =

Australian rules footballer

Personal information
- Full name: Toby Thurstans
- Born: 14 August 1980 (age 46)
- Original team: Dandenong Stingrays(TAC Cup)/Crib Point (VIC)
- Height: 196 cm (6 ft 5 in)
- Weight: 95 kg (209 lb)
- Position: Key Position Defender

Club information
- Current club: Port Adelaide
- Number: 28

Playing career^{1}
Years	Club	Games (Goals)
1999–2009	Port Adelaide	110 (55)
- ^{1} Playing statistics correct to the end of Round 22, 2009.

Career highlights
- SANFL Premiership player 2002 (Sturt); AFL Premiership player 2004

Toby Thurstans (born 14 August 1980) is a former Australian rules footballer who played for the Port Adelaide Football Club in the Australian Football League (AFL).

== Career ==
Thurstans was drafted to Port Adelaide, from the Dandenong Stingrays, at selection 39 in the 1998 National AFL Draft. He could not get a game and played in the South Australian National Football League (SANFL) for Sturt until his AFL debut for Port Adelaide in Round 1, 2003 versus West Coast Eagles at Subiaco. Thurstans won Port's best first year player award for season 2003. The following season he played all 25 games, kicked 28 goals, played in the 2004 AFL Grand Final and was one of three players to kick three or more goals in Port's 40 point Grand Final win over the Brisbane Lions.

In 2005 and 2006, Thurstans struggled to find the form he had in 2004 and was used as trade bait at the end of the 2006 season but remained with Port Adelaide.

Thurstans played all 25 games for Port in 2007, starring in his new role as a defender, getting back to the form he displayed in 2004.

== Retirement ==
Thurstans announced his retirement from Port Adelaide on Thursday 3 September 2009, after playing 110 games for the club since his debut in 2003. Thurstans retired as a Life Member of the Port Adelaide Football Club, citing his decision to retire had been coming for a while, despite some good form throughout the 2009 season: "The mental and physical rigours of an AFL season demand so much, and I am not the sort of person who is going to go on unless I think I can contribute 100 percent."

Port Adelaide coach Mark Williams says Toby's career highlights to young players how persistence can pay off. "Toby retires with an AFL premiership medal after waiting four years to play his first game," Williams said. "And he didn’t just play in that Grand Final – he played really well."

== Playing statistics ==
Legend
G	Goals	K	Kicks	D	Disposals	T	Tackles
B	Behinds	H	Handballs	M	Marks

Season	Team	No.	Games	Totals							Averages (per game)						
Season	Team	No.	Games	G	B	K	H	D	M	T	G	B	K	H	D	M	T
2003	Port Adelaide	28	10	4	2	49	24	73	31	13	0.4	0.2	4.9	2.4	7.3	3.1	1.3
2004	Port Adelaide	28	25	24	13	125	103	228	99	39	1.0	0.5	5.0	4.1	9.1	4.0	1.6
2005	Port Adelaide	28	10	7	1	56	34	90	49	16	0.7	0.1	5.6	3.4	9.0	4.9	1.6
2006	Port Adelaide	28	13	15	8	73	57	130	67	30	1.2	0.6	5.6	4.4	10.0	5.2	2.3
2007	Port Adelaide	28	25	0	1	145	162	307	124	56	0.0	0.0	5.8	6.5	12.3	5.0	2.2
2008	Port Adelaide	28	16	5	0	107	131	238	83	32	0.3	0.0	6.7	8.2	14.9	5.2	2.0
2009	Port Adelaide	28	11	0	5	87	103	190	61	26	0.0	0.5	7.9	9.4	17.3	5.5	2.4
Career			110	55	30	642	614	1256	514	212	0.5	0.3	5.8	5.6	11.4	4.7	1.9
