= Angelo Lekkas =

Australian rules footballer (born 1976)

Personal information
- Full name: Angelo Lekkas
- Born: 29 June 1976 (age 50); Williamstown, Melbourne Victoria
- Original team: Northern Knights
- Draft: 17th overall, 1993; Hawthorn
- Height: 187 cm (6 ft 2 in)
- Weight: 85 kg (187 lb)
- Position: Midfielder

Playing career^{1}
Years	Club	Games (Goals)
1994–2005	Hawthorn	180 (120)

Representative team honours
Years	Team	Games (Goals)
1999	Victoria	1 (2)

International team honours
2002	Australia	1 (1)
- ^{1} Playing statistics correct to the end of 2005.

Career highlights
- AFL Rising Star nominee: 1997

Angelo Lekkas (born 29 June 1976) is a former Australian rules footballer who played his entire professional career with the Hawthorn Football Club in the Australian Football League (AFL). After a stellar year playing in the TAC competition with the Northern knights in 1993 and winning the best and fairest, he was highly sought after by AFL clubs, being a first-round pick in the 1993 AFL draft and number 17 overall.

== Early life ==
Lekkas was born in 1976 to Greek parents and grew up in the northern suburbs of Melbourne. Raised by a single mother, he has often attributed a lot of his success to his mother's strong personality.

== AFL career ==
Lekkas was taken by Hawthorn at pick number 17 overall (Hawthorn's first pick) in the 1993 AFL draft which was a trade for Tony Hall (when Hall left the Hawks for Adelaide).

Arriving at the Hawthorn football club at a time of many great premiership players meant that Lekkas would spend the first couple years in the reserves while the team would transition into a rebuild.

Lekkas blossomed under coach Ken Judge. starting his career in the seniors as a defender with some midfield glimpses. Lekkas then evolved his game to be one of the main midfielders in the Hawks team being a dynamic midfielder who would regularly kick goals.

In 1999, he was a Victorian state representative In 2002, he represented Australia in the International Rules series.

After a practice match in February 2005, Lekkas suffered an apparent minor stroke and was told he might never play again. Losing some coordination, Lekkas committed himself to a rehabilitation program and inside 3 months fully recovered. He made a successful return to AFL football in round 14, 2005, against Geelong where he kicked 3 goals in the first half.

Lekkas shocked most at Hawthorn when he announced his early retirement from AFL football on 26 August 2005, his last game being played at the MCG against Sydney on 27 August 2005. In his retirement speech he told the media that the Hawthorn Football club was a blessing in his life and when asked if he felt like the unluckiest man in the world he responded, "for the good that has happened to me playing this game, I wouldn't touch it".

Lekkas finished his AFL career with 180 games and 120 goals to his credit and a career total of 14 Brownlow votes.

== Ambassadorial roles ==
Lekkas was named the 2005 stroke foundation Ambassador and in 2007 awarded the Australian Football League multicultural ambassador. Lekkas was selected to attend the 2005 Anzac presentation in Gallipoli, Turkey, to represent the AFL along with Australian Football Legend Ron Barassi. His AFL role would also take him to South Africa in 2007, where he would oversee a program to encourage the growth of Australian football.

== Return to Australian rules ==
After a period of disenchantment with the game, Angelo returned to work with the AFL in 2007 as part-time as a multicultural officer and AFL ambassador and also in a community liaison role at Hawthorn as part of the settlement with the club.

== Present day ==
Lekkas now currently runs his own private sports tuition company with a focus on helping fast track young footballers overall development. Saying that he is passionate about assisting in the development of the next generation of potential AFL players Lekkas also runs a mortgage brokering company based in Collins street, Melbourne.
