= James Thiessen =

Australian rules footballer

Personal information
- Born: 10 February 1974 (age 52)
- Original team: Glen Waverley
- Debut: Round 16, 1993, Richmond vs. Adelaide, at Football Park
- Height: 180 cm (5 ft 11 in)
- Weight: 80 kg (176 lb)

Playing career^{1}
Years	Club	Games (Goals)
1993	Richmond	7 (3)
1995–2000, 2002–03	Norwood	119 (150)
1998–2000	Adelaide	44 (21)
Total		170 (174)
- ^{1} Playing statistics correct to the end of 2000.

Career highlights
- AFL Premiership player: (1998); SANFL Premiership player: (1997); Fos Williams Medal: (1997)

James Thiessen (born 10 February 1974) is a former Australian rules footballer who played for the Richmond Football Club and Adelaide Football Club in the Australian Football League (AFL), as well as Norwood Football Club in the South Australian National Football League (SANFL). His father Tony had played league football three decades earlier.

Playing mainly on the wing, Thiessen started his AFL career at Richmond in 1993, debuting in a 139-point loss to his future club Adelaide, but was delisted after just one season. He spent the next four years with Norwood in the SANFL, playing in their 1997 premiership side and also winning a Fos Williams Medal that year for his performance for South Australia in an interstate match against the ACT.

Thiessen was recruited by the Adelaide Crows for the 1998 season and played in their winning Grand Final that year against North Melbourne. He remained with them for two more seasons before returning to Norwood.

== Playing statistics ==
Legend
G	Goals	K	Kicks	D	Disposals	T	Tackles
B	Behinds	H	Handballs	M	Marks

Season	Team	No.	Games	Totals							Averages (per game)						
Season	Team	No.	Games	G	B	K	H	D	M	T	G	B	K	H	D	M	T
1993	Richmond	46	7	3	8	83	34	117	21	4	0.4	1.1	11.9	4.9	16.7	3.0	0.6
1998	Adelaide	29	24	8	13	217	104	321	64	34	0.3	0.5	9.0	4.3	13.4	2.7	1.4
1999	Adelaide	29	18	13	8	160	84	244	62	19	0.7	0.4	8.9	4.7	13.6	3.4	1.1
2000	Adelaide	29	2	0	0	1	4	5	1	1	0.0	0.0	0.5	2.0	2.5	0.5	0.5
Career			51	24	29	461	226	687	148	58	0.5	0.6	9.0	4.4	13.5	2.9	1.1
