= Mark Roberts (Australian footballer) =

Australian rules footballer

Personal information
- Full name: Mark Roberts
- Born: 28 June 1965 (age 61)
- Original team: St George (Sydney)
- Height: 190 cm (6 ft 3 in)
- Weight: 92 kg (203 lb)

Playing career^{1}
Years	Club	Games (Goals)
1985–1986	Sydney Swans	18 (5)
1987–1990	Brisbane Bears	59 (14)
1991–1999	North Melbourne	125 (150)
Total		202 (169)
- ^{1} Playing statistics correct to the end of 1999.

Career highlights
- AFL Premiership: 1996

Mark Roberts (born 28 June 1965) is a former Australian rules footballer who played for the Sydney Swans, Brisbane Bears and North Melbourne in the Victorian/Australian Football League (VFL/AFL).

Nicknamed the "Fridge", he played 18 games in 2 seasons with Sydney Swans, 59 games in four seasons with Brisbane Bears and 125 with the North Melbourne Kangaroos. His height was 189 cm and his weight was 96 kg (formerly 104 kg).

He was recruited from the St George Football Club in Sydney.

In 2001, Roberts and former teammate David King were charged with assaulting a hot dog seller.

In 2006, Roberts was senior coach for the Labrador Football Club in the AFL Queensland.

== Statistics ==
Legend
G	Goals	K	Kicks	D	Disposals	T	Tackles
B	Behinds	H	Handballs	M	Marks	H/O	Hit-outs

Season	Team	No.	Games	Totals								Averages (per game)								Votes
Season	Team	No.	Games	G	B	K	H	D	M	T	H/O	G	B	K	H	D	M	T	H/O	Votes
1985	Sydney	51	6	4	4	31	9	40	13	—N/a	0	0.7	0.7	5.2	1.5	6.7	2.2	—N/a	0.0	0
1986	Sydney	27	12	1	1	87	43	130	23	—N/a	2	0.1	0.1	7.3	3.6	10.8	1.9	—N/a	0.2	3
1987	Brisbane Bears	27	14	0	0	77	47	124	29	11	0	0.0	0.0	5.5	3.4	8.9	2.1	0.8	0.0	0
1988	Brisbane Bears	27	8	1	1	52	18	70	13	3	3	0.1	0.1	6.5	2.3	8.8	1.6	0.4	0.4	0
1989	Brisbane Bears	27	19	5	3	166	83	249	61	17	3	0.3	0.2	8.7	4.4	13.1	3.2	0.9	0.2	0
1990	Brisbane Bears	27	18	8	11	162	88	250	66	15	9	0.4	0.6	9.0	4.9	13.9	3.7	0.8	0.5	0
1991	North Melbourne	22	12	8	6	116	81	197	41	13	14	0.7	0.5	9.7	6.8	16.4	3.4	1.1	1.2	0
1992	North Melbourne	22	1	0	2	6	1	7	2	1	0	0.0	2.0	6.0	1.0	7.0	2.0	1.0	0.0	0
1993	North Melbourne	22	21	47	14	223	103	326	66	21	38	2.2	0.7	10.6	4.9	15.5	3.1	1.0	1.8	0
1994	North Melbourne	22	10	23	18	116	54	170	43	9	3	2.3	1.8	11.6	5.4	17.0	4.3	0.9	0.3	0
1995	North Melbourne	22	21	16	14	152	81	233	52	8	30	0.8	0.7	7.2	3.9	11.1	2.5	0.4	1.4	1
1996†	North Melbourne	22	22	25	20	227	110	337	72	32	25	1.1	0.9	10.3	5.0	15.3	3.3	1.5	1.1	2
1997	North Melbourne	22	22	17	21	250	101	351	84	28	36	0.8	1.0	11.4	4.6	16.0	3.8	1.3	1.6	3
1998	North Melbourne	22	15	14	15	162	80	242	51	16	44	0.9	1.0	10.8	5.3	16.1	3.4	1.1	2.9	3
1999	Kangaroos	22	1	0	0	0	2	2	0	0	0	0.0	0.0	0.0	2.0	2.0	0.0	0.0	0.0	0
Career			202	169	130	1827	901	2728	616	174	207	0.8	0.6	9.0	4.5	13.5	3.0	0.9	1.0	12
