= Dan Lonergan =

Australian sports broadcaster

Dan Lonergan is a Melbourne-based sports commentator and writer for ABC Radio Grandstand.

From July 2016 until May 2017, when local programming was dropped, Lonergan hosted "The Lunch Box" on digital radio station EON Sports Radio.
