= 1998 AFL season =

102nd season of the Australian Football League (AFL)

1998 AFL premiership season
- Teams: 16
- Premiers: Adelaide; 2nd premiership
- Minor premiers: North Melbourne; 4th minor premiership
- Pre-season cup: North Melbourne; 2nd pre-season cup win
- Brownlow Medallist: Robert Harvey (St Kilda)
- Leading goalkicker: Tony Lockett (Sydney)

Attendance
- Matches played: 185
- Total attendance: 6,691,897 (36,172 per match)
- Highest: 94,431 (Grand Final, Adelaide vs. North Melbourne)

The 1998 AFL season was the 102nd season of the Australian Football League (AFL), the highest level senior Australian rules football competition in Australia, which was known as the Victorian Football League until 1989. The season featured sixteen clubs, ran from 27 March until 26 September, and comprised a 22-game home-and-away season followed by a finals series featuring the top eight clubs.

The premiership was won by the Adelaide Football Club for the second time and second time consecutively, after it defeated North Melbourne by 35 points in the 1998 AFL Grand Final.

== AFL draft ==
See 1998 AFL draft.

== Ansett Australia Cup ==
North Melbourne defeated St Kilda 14.13 (97) to 12.11 (83) in the final.

== Home-and-away season ==
=== Round 1 ===
Home team	Score	Away team	Score	Venue	Attendance	Date
North Melbourne	15.13 (103)	West Coast	15.11 (101)	MCG	27,150	Friday, 27 March
Carlton	10.13 (73)	Adelaide	9.9 (63)	Princes Park	20,957	Saturday, 28 March
Collingwood	18.15 (123)	Hawthorn	12.12 (84)	MCG	47,628	Saturday, 28 March
St Kilda	17.7 (109)	Geelong	13.13 (91)	Waverley Park	34,323	Saturday, 28 March
Brisbane Lions	10.12 (72)	Western Bulldogs	17.16 (118)	Gabba	18,788	Saturday, 28 March
Port Adelaide	17.15 (117)	Sydney	20.4 (124)	Football Park	31,230	Sunday, 29 March
Richmond	14.19 (103)	Essendon	13.11 (89)	MCG	70,200	Sunday, 29 March
Fremantle	13.6 (84)	Melbourne	8.13 (61)	Subiaco Oval	18,133	Sunday, 29 March

=== Round 2 ===
Home team	Score	Away team	Score	Venue	Attendance	Date
West Coast	17.14 (116)	Collingwood	8.8 (56)	Subiaco Oval	35,909	Friday, 3 April
Geelong	14.15 (99)	Richmond	11.14 (80)	Kardinia Park	26,669	Saturday, 4 April
Hawthorn	10.7 (67)	Port Adelaide	17.10 (112)	Waverley Park	18,698	Saturday, 4 April
Melbourne	19.11 (125)	North Melbourne	15.10 (100)	MCG	29,990	Saturday, 4 April
Sydney	20.15 (135)	Brisbane Lions	14.13 (97)	SCG	32,111	Saturday, 4 April
Adelaide	25.17 (167)	Fremantle	11.8 (74)	Football Park	40,602	Sunday, 5 April
Essendon	28.14 (182)	St Kilda	13.15 (93)	MCG	53,905	Sunday, 5 April
Western Bulldogs	22.8 (140)	Carlton	13.6 (84)	Princes Park	27,659	Sunday, 5 April

=== Round 3 ===
Home team	Score	Away team	Score	Venue	Attendance	Date
Richmond	15.13 (103)	Hawthorn	15.7 (97)	MCG	39,954	Saturday, 11 April
Western Bulldogs	16.23 (119)	Collingwood	13.7 (85)	Princes Park	26,518	Saturday, 11 April
Port Adelaide	10.9 (69)	North Melbourne	15.8 (98)	Football Park	28,167	Saturday, 11 April
St Kilda	12.10 (82)	Adelaide	8.12 (60)	Waverley Park	20,532	Sunday, 12 April
Sydney	24.16 (160)	Geelong	7.15 (57)	SCG	29,614	Sunday, 12 April
Fremantle	10.7 (67)	West Coast	14.10 (94)	Subiaco Oval	34,710	Sunday, 12 April
Brisbane Lions	12.15 (87)	Melbourne	15.10 (100)	Gabba	17,161	Monday, 13 April
Carlton	14.14 (98)	Essendon	14.15 (99)	MCG	68,177	Monday, 13 April

=== Round 4 ===
Home team	Score	Away team	Score	Venue	Attendance	Date
Collingwood	20.13 (133)	Richmond	12.16 (88)	MCG	78,259	Friday, 17 April
Geelong	11.13 (79)	Western Bulldogs	14.10 (94)	Kardinia Park	26,301	Saturday, 18 April
Hawthorn	18.13 (121)	St Kilda	20.9 (129)	Waverley Park	36,117	Saturday, 18 April
West Coast	14.15 (99)	Sydney	18.10 (118)	WACA	27,059	Saturday, 18 April
Port Adelaide	11.7 (73)	Adelaide	8.16 (64)	Football Park	41,476	Sunday, 19 April
Carlton	10.10 (70)	Melbourne	10.12 (72)	Princes Park	27,508	Sunday, 19 April
Essendon	11.10 (76)	Fremantle	14.16 (100)	Waverley Park	26,241	Sunday, 19 April
North Melbourne	21.11 (137)	Brisbane Lions	17.18 (120)	MCG	22,688	Sunday, 19 April

=== Round 5 ===
Home team	Score	Away team	Score	Venue	Attendance	Date
Richmond	12.14 (86)	West Coast	10.11 (71)	MCG	34,837	Friday, 24 April
Collingwood	15.18 (108)	Essendon	12.16 (88)	MCG	81,542	Saturday, 25 April
Hawthorn	18.16 (124)	Brisbane Lions	12.11 (83)	Waverley Park	22,366	Saturday, 25 April
Fremantle	16.8 (104)	North Melbourne	12.15 (87)	WACA	26,335	Saturday, 25 April
Melbourne	14.18 (102)	Port Adelaide	6.17 (53)	MCG	21,726	Sunday, 26 April
St Kilda	13.10 (88)	Carlton	9.12 (66)	Waverley Park	31,955	Sunday, 26 April
Sydney	14.15 (99)	Western Bulldogs	12.11 (83)	SCG	36,505	Sunday, 26 April
Adelaide	12.15 (87)	Geelong	8.13 (61)	Football Park	39,974	Sunday, 26 April

=== Round 6 ===
Home team	Score	Away team	Score	Venue	Attendance	Date
Brisbane Lions	13.8 (86)	Richmond	7.9 (51)	Gabba	19,219	Friday, 1 May
Carlton	9.13 (67)	Collingwood	14.12 (96)	Melbourne Cricket Ground	69,963	Saturday, 2 May
Geelong	13.12 (90)	Hawthorn	10.13 (73)	Kardinia Park	23,267	Saturday, 2 May
Western Bulldogs	13.19 (97)	Essendon	13.11 (89)	Princes Park	24,813	Saturday, 2 May
Port Adelaide	13.18 (96)	Fremantle	9.6 (60)	Football Park	30,519	Saturday, 2 May
North Melbourne	15.16 (106)	Adelaide	15.12 (102)	Melbourne Cricket Ground	23,041	Sunday, 3 May
Sydney	8.13 (61)	Melbourne	12.8 (80)	Sydney Cricket Ground	25,951	Sunday, 3 May
West Coast	18.11 (119)	St Kilda	18.13 (121)	Subiaco Oval	36,406	Sunday, 3 May

=== Round 7 ===
Home team	Score	Away team	Score	Venue	Attendance	Date
Collingwood	12.7 (79)	Sydney	18.7 (115)	Melbourne Cricket Ground	57,894	Friday, 8 May
Fremantle	8.9 (57)	Hawthorn	15.9 (99)	WACA	22,037	Friday, 8 May
Carlton	11.10 (76)	Port Adelaide	25.15 (165)	Princes Park	16,058	Saturday, 9 May
St Kilda	11.16 (82)	Brisbane Lions	15.9 (99)	Waverley Park	23,960	Saturday, 9 May
Essendon	11.4 (70)	Geelong	12.7 (79)	Melbourne Cricket Ground	56,093	Saturday, 9 May
Adelaide	11.13 (79)	West Coast	10.11 (71)	Football Park	39,057	Sunday, 10 May
Richmond	13.13 (91)	Melbourne	7.7 (49)	Melbourne Cricket Ground	46,217	Sunday, 10 May
Western Bulldogs	16.15 (111)	North Melbourne	12.11 (83)	Princes Park	22,058	Sunday, 10 May

=== Round 8 ===
Home team	Score	Away team	Score	Venue	Attendance	Date
Essendon	12.12 (84)	Brisbane Lions	8.22 (70)	Melbourne Cricket Ground	35,384	Friday, 15 May
Geelong	12.4 (76)	Fremantle	6.18 (54)	Kardinia Park	19,449	Saturday, 16 May
North Melbourne	15.15 (105)	Sydney	14.11 (95)	Melbourne Cricket Ground	43,400	Saturday, 16 May
St Kilda	10.12 (72)	Port Adelaide	5.15 (45)	Waverley Park	20,063	Saturday, 16 May
West Coast	12.20 (92)	Carlton	12.12 (84)	Subiaco Oval	37,361	Sunday, 17 May
Hawthorn	14.12 (96)	Western Bulldogs	21.10 (136)	Waverley Park	34,541	Sunday, 17 May
Melbourne	17.12 (114)	Collingwood	16.15 (111)	Melbourne Cricket Ground	57,425	Sunday, 17 May
Adelaide	11.13 (79)	Richmond	14.8 (92)	Football Park	40,559	Sunday, 17 May

=== Round 9 ===
Home team	Score	Away team	Score	Venue	Attendance	Date
Fremantle	14.21 (105)	St Kilda	13.12 (90)	WACA	22,803	Friday, 22 May
Carlton	10.14 (74)	North Melbourne	17.13 (115)	Princes Park	20,205	Saturday, 23 May
Geelong	5.14 (44)	West Coast	9.11 (65)	Kardinia Park	19,848	Saturday, 23 May
Melbourne	12.12 (84)	Essendon	18.14 (122)	Melbourne Cricket Ground	49,580	Saturday, 23 May
Western Bulldogs	13.10 (88)	Richmond	11.9 (75)	Waverley Park	36,428	Saturday, 23 May
Brisbane Lions	6.14 (50)	Adelaide	14.14 (98)	Gabba	19,509	Saturday, 23 May
Sydney	17.15 (117)	Hawthorn	11.14 (80)	Sydney Cricket Ground	31,420	Sunday, 24 May
Port Adelaide	11.14 (80)	Collingwood	9.9 (63)	Football Park	35,659	Sunday, 24 May

=== Round 10 ===
Home team	Score	Away team	Score	Venue	Attendance	Date
West Coast	16.17 (113)	Western Bulldogs	15.10 (100)	WACA	28,193	Friday, 29 May
Carlton	17.9 (111)	Brisbane Lions	12.15 (87)	Princes Park	18,317	Saturday, 30 May
Hawthorn	13.9 (87)	Essendon	13.15 (93)	Waverley Park	41,780	Saturday, 30 May
Richmond	13.19 (97)	Port Adelaide	9.13 (67)	Melbourne Cricket Ground	31,225	Saturday, 30 May
Sydney	8.5 (53)	St Kilda	24.10 (154)	Sydney Cricket Ground	36,180	Saturday, 30 May
Adelaide	17.9 (111)	Melbourne	8.10 (58)	Football Park	40,844	Sunday, 31 May
Collingwood	19.5 (119)	Fremantle	17.10 (112)	Victoria Park	23,188	Sunday, 31 May
North Melbourne	13.13 (91)	Geelong	17.12 (114)	Melbourne Cricket Ground	35,595	Sunday, 31 May

=== Round 11 ===
Home team	Score	Away team	Score	Venue	Attendance	Date
Essendon	24.16 (160)	Sydney	15.10 (100)	Melbourne Cricket Ground	62,866	Friday, 5 June
Geelong	12.8 (80)	Carlton	9.9 (63)	Melbourne Cricket Ground	41,222	Saturday, 6 June
Hawthorn	10.10 (70)	Melbourne	18.9 (117)	Waverley Park	31,365	Saturday, 6 June
Port Adelaide	7.13 (55)	West Coast	8.9 (57)	Football Park	28,284	Saturday, 6 June
Fremantle	17.19 (121)	Brisbane Lions	7.8 (50)	Subiaco Oval	17,452	Sunday, 7 June
Western Bulldogs	24.11 (155)	Adelaide	13.10 (88)	Princes Park	21,165	Sunday, 7 June
North Melbourne	19.12 (126)	Collingwood	13.19 (97)	Melbourne Cricket Ground	58,369	Monday, 8 June
St Kilda	21.11 (137)	Richmond	16.14 (110)	Waverley Park	71,488	Monday, 8 June

=== Round 12 ===
Home team	Score	Away team	Score	Venue	Attendance	Date
West Coast	19.9 (123)	Hawthorn	17.6 (108)	WACA	27,112	Friday, 12 June
Carlton	14.16 (100)	Sydney	11.8 (74)	Princes Park	23,226	Saturday, 13 June
Melbourne	7.4 (46)	Geelong	22.9 (141)	Melbourne Cricket Ground	41,567	Saturday, 13 June
Adelaide	15.18 (108)	Essendon	15.16 (106)	Football Park	40,700	Saturday, 13 June
Brisbane Lions	18.15 (123)	Port Adelaide	18.15 (123)	Gabba	15,924	Sunday, 14 June
Collingwood	11.16 (82)	St Kilda	17.15 (117)	Waverley Park	50,578	Sunday, 14 June
Richmond	19.13 (127)	North Melbourne	14.8 (92)	Melbourne Cricket Ground	43,497	Sunday, 14 June
Western Bulldogs	18.14 (122)	Fremantle	15.6 (96)	Princes Park	16,487	Sunday, 14 June

=== Round 13 ===
Home team	Score	Away team	Score	Venue	Attendance	Date
Essendon	11.6 (72)	West Coast	11.17 (83)	Melbourne Cricket Ground	45,277	Friday, 19 June
Collingwood	10.10 (70)	Adelaide	11.13 (79)	Melbourne Cricket Ground	34,630	Saturday, 20 June
Geelong	12.8 (80)	Brisbane Lions	15.16 (106)	Kardinia Park	21,833	Saturday, 20 June
Hawthorn	17.12 (114)	North Melbourne	17.10 (112)	Waverley Park	23,845	Saturday, 20 June
Port Adelaide	11.7 (73)	Western Bulldogs	5.9 (39)	Football Park	28,746	Saturday, 20 June
Melbourne	5.12 (42)	St Kilda	19.13 (127)	Melbourne Cricket Ground	35,055	Sunday, 21 June
Sydney	16.6 (102)	Richmond	13.13 (91)	Sydney Cricket Ground	28,445	Sunday, 21 June
Fremantle	10.16 (76)	Carlton	10.8 (68)	Subiaco Oval	23,899	Sunday, 21 June

=== Round 14 ===
Home team	Score	Away team	Score	Venue	Attendance	Date
North Melbourne	19.13 (127)	Essendon	16.13 (109)	Melbourne Cricket Ground	48,618	Friday, 26 June
Carlton	13.14 (92)	Hawthorn	11.10 (76)	Princes Park	25,529	Saturday, 27 June
Richmond	23.7 (145)	Fremantle	8.7 (55)	Melbourne Cricket Ground	25,723	Saturday, 27 June
St Kilda	12.15 (87)	Western Bulldogs	10.12 (72)	Waverley Park	49,706	Saturday, 27 June
Port Adelaide	13.13 (91)	Geelong	10.13 (73)	Football Park	32,431	Saturday, 27 June
Brisbane Lions	19.21 (135)	Collingwood	12.11 (83)	Gabba	17,275	Sunday, 28 June
Sydney	12.15 (87)	Adelaide	18.16 (124)	Sydney Cricket Ground	30,735	Sunday, 28 June
West Coast	11.13 (79)	Melbourne	14.12 (96)	Subiaco Oval	35,238	Sunday, 28 June

=== Round 15 ===
Home team	Score	Away team	Score	Venue	Attendance	Date
Richmond	20.12 (132)	Carlton	11.4 (70)	Melbourne Cricket Ground	66,287	Friday, 3 July
Essendon	16.12 (108)	Port Adelaide	12.9 (81)	Melbourne Cricket Ground	37,685	Saturday, 4 July
St Kilda	12.7 (79)	North Melbourne	22.13 (145)	Waverley Park	36,557	Saturday, 4 July
Western Bulldogs	12.11 (83)	Melbourne	9.11 (65)	Princes Park	20,782	Saturday, 4 July
Brisbane Lions	6.13 (49)	West Coast	11.10 (76)	Gabba	15,369	Saturday, 4 July
Adelaide	9.14 (68)	Hawthorn	4.11 (35)	Football Park	38,430	Sunday, 5 July
Collingwood	10.11 (71)	Geelong	9.7 (61)	Melbourne Cricket Ground	44,806	Sunday, 5 July
Fremantle	10.9 (69)	Sydney	13.4 (82)	Subiaco Oval	21,042	Sunday, 5 July

=== Round 16 ===
Home team	Score	Away team	Score	Venue	Attendance	Date
Adelaide	16.5 (101)	Carlton	16.9 (105)	Football Park	42,713	Friday, 17 July
Geelong	10.16 (76)	St Kilda	15.10 (100)	Kardinia Park	26,879	Saturday, 18 July
Melbourne	16.10 (106)	Fremantle	13.5 (83)	Melbourne Cricket Ground	20,365	Saturday, 18 July
Western Bulldogs	27.15 (177)	Brisbane Lions	13.8 (86)	Princes Park	16,131	Saturday, 18 July
Hawthorn	4.14 (38)	Collingwood	19.10 (124)	Waverley Park	39,325	Saturday, 18 July
Essendon	14.10 (94)	Richmond	10.15 (75)	Melbourne Cricket Ground	83,773	Sunday, 19 July
Sydney	18.10 (118)	Port Adelaide	12.12 (84)	Sydney Cricket Ground	29,325	Sunday, 19 July
West Coast	11.14 (80)	North Melbourne	13.16 (94)	Subiaco Oval	36,463	Sunday, 19 July

=== Round 17 ===
Home team	Score	Away team	Score	Venue	Attendance	Date
Fremantle	14.14 (98)	Adelaide	15.7 (97)	Subiaco Oval	18,876	Friday, 24 July
Carlton	29.11 (185)	Western Bulldogs	15.15 (105)	Princes Park	26,911	Saturday, 25 July
Collingwood	9.11 (65)	West Coast	13.8 (86)	Victoria Park	23,293	Saturday, 25 July
North Melbourne	22.20 (152)	Melbourne	13.9 (87)	Melbourne Cricket Ground	36,042	Saturday, 25 July
Port Adelaide	18.11 (119)	Hawthorn	15.8 (98)	Football Park	30,104	Saturday, 25 July
Brisbane Lions	14.5 (89)	Sydney	22.17 (149)	Gabba	15,475	Sunday, 26 July
Richmond	10.7 (67)	Geelong	8.10 (58)	Melbourne Cricket Ground	44,222	Sunday, 26 July
St Kilda	13.9 (87)	Essendon	14.6 (90)	Waverley Park	50,778	Sunday, 26 July

=== Round 18 ===
Home team	Score	Away team	Score	Venue	Attendance	Date
Collingwood	10.7 (67)	Western Bulldogs	16.14 (110)	Melbourne Cricket Ground	40,832	Friday, 31 July
Geelong	12.15 (87)	Sydney	19.7 (121)	Kardinia Park	23,137	Saturday, 1 August
Melbourne	22.19 (151)	Brisbane Lions	8.8 (56)	Melbourne Cricket Ground	16,518	Saturday, 1 August
North Melbourne	18.23 (131)	Port Adelaide	10.16 (76)	Manuka Oval	11,321	Saturday, 1 August
Adelaide	19.23 (137)	St Kilda	10.7 (67)	Football Park	40,670	Saturday, 1 August
Essendon	12.12 (84)	Carlton	11.12 (78)	Melbourne Cricket Ground	70,969	Sunday, 2 August
Hawthorn	10.10 (70)	Richmond	4.10 (34)	Waverley Park	37,297	Sunday, 2 August
West Coast	15.9 (99)	Fremantle	8.12 (60)	Subiaco Oval	37,145	Sunday, 2 August

=== Round 19 ===
Home team	Score	Away team	Score	Venue	Attendance	Date
Brisbane Lions	12.14 (86)	North Melbourne	15.23 (113)	Gabba	14,973	Friday, 7 August
Melbourne	16.17 (113)	Carlton	8.16 (64)	Melbourne Cricket Ground	39,704	Saturday, 8 August
St Kilda	10.9 (69)	Hawthorn	19.14 (128)	Waverley Park	32,286	Saturday, 8 August
Western Bulldogs	13.18 (96)	Geelong	14.13 (97)	Princes Park	17,535	Saturday, 8 August
Fremantle	12.14 (86)	Essendon	18.11 (119)	Subiaco Oval	28,444	Saturday, 8 August
Richmond	12.14 (86)	Collingwood	9.13 (67)	Melbourne Cricket Ground	57,303	Sunday, 9 August
Sydney	10.14 (74)	West Coast	9.14 (68)	Sydney Cricket Ground	30,934	Sunday, 9 August
Adelaide	22.12 (144)	Port Adelaide	10.10 (70)	Football Park	46,850	Sunday, 9 August

=== Round 20 ===
Home team	Score	Away team	Score	Venue	Attendance	Date
North Melbourne	22.19 (151)	Fremantle	7.5 (47)	Melbourne Cricket Ground	19,429	Friday, 14 August
Essendon	16.13 (109)	Collingwood	14.15 (99)	Melbourne Cricket Ground	64,480	Saturday, 15 August
Geelong	6.8 (44)	Adelaide	18.10 (118)	Kardinia Park	22,384	Saturday, 15 August
Western Bulldogs	15.9 (99)	Sydney	15.7 (97)	Waverley Park	32,577	Saturday, 15 August
Brisbane Lions	7.17 (59)	Hawthorn	13.16 (94)	Gabba	14,738	Saturday, 15 August
Port Adelaide	10.11 (71)	Melbourne	14.10 (94)	Football Park	28,660	Sunday, 16 August
Carlton	19.20 (134)	St Kilda	15.14 (104)	Melbourne Cricket Ground	42,120	Sunday, 16 August
West Coast	16.16 (112)	Richmond	11.7 (73)	Subiaco Oval	37,920	Sunday, 16 August

=== Round 21 ===
Home team	Score	Away team	Score	Venue	Attendance	Date
Essendon	13.12 (90)	Western Bulldogs	14.17 (101)	Melbourne Cricket Ground	67,157	Friday, 21 August
Richmond	24.11 (155)	Brisbane Lions	11.12 (78)	Melbourne Cricket Ground	27,912	Saturday, 22 August
St Kilda	9.9 (63)	West Coast	7.13 (55)	Waverley Park	26,895	Saturday, 22 August
Adelaide	13.14 (92)	North Melbourne	14.21 (105)	Football Park	43,297	Saturday, 22 August
Collingwood	8.15 (63)	Carlton	17.16 (118)	Melbourne Cricket Ground	60,741	Sunday, 23 August
Hawthorn	11.18 (84)	Geelong	8.15 (63)	Waverley Park	28,833	Sunday, 23 August
Fremantle	10.11 (71)	Port Adelaide	19.10 (124)	Subiaco Oval	20,412	Sunday, 23 August
Melbourne	17.12 (114)	Sydney	12.11 (83)	Melbourne Cricket Ground	52,614	Monday, 24 August

=== Round 22 ===
Home team	Score	Away team	Score	Venue	Attendance	Date
North Melbourne	17.11 (113)	Western Bulldogs	16.12 (108)	Melbourne Cricket Ground	68,050	Friday, 28 August
Geelong	19.13 (127)	Essendon	18.9 (117)	Melbourne Cricket Ground	61,089	Saturday, 29 August
Hawthorn	22.17 (149)	Fremantle	9.6 (60)	Waverley Park	39,735	Saturday, 29 August
West Coast	12.9 (81)	Adelaide	15.16 (106)	Subiaco Oval	37,388	Saturday, 29 August
Brisbane Lions	12.20 (92)	St Kilda	13.13 (91)	Gabba	14,993	Saturday, 29 August
Melbourne	19.19 (133)	Richmond	8.9 (57)	Melbourne Cricket Ground	76,387	Sunday, 30 August
Sydney	18.11 (119)	Collingwood	16.11 (107)	Sydney Cricket Ground	35,814	Sunday, 30 August
Port Adelaide	12.12 (84)	Carlton	21.12 (138)	Football Park	34,518	Sunday, 30 August

== Ladder ==
(P)	Premiers
	Qualified for finals

#	Team	P	W	L	D	PF	PA	%	Pts
1	North Melbourne	22	16	6	0	2486	2117	117.4	64
2	Western Bulldogs	22	15	7	0	2353	2019	116.5	60
3	Sydney	22	14	8	0	2283	2143	106.5	56
4	Melbourne	22	14	8	0	2009	1956	102.7	56
5	Adelaide (P)	22	13	9	0	2172	1763	123.2	52
6	St Kilda	22	13	9	0	2148	2104	102.1	52
7	West Coast	22	12	10	0	1940	1773	109.4	48
8	Essendon	22	12	10	0	2250	2071	108.6	48
9	Richmond	22	12	10	0	2018	1926	104.8	48
10	Port Adelaide	22	9	12	1	1928	2017	95.6	38
11	Carlton	22	9	13	0	2018	2109	95.7	36
12	Geelong	22	9	13	0	1777	1963	90.5	36
13	Hawthorn	22	8	14	0	1992	2083	95.6	32
14	Collingwood	22	7	15	0	1968	2167	90.8	28
15	Fremantle	22	7	15	0	1739	2277	76.4	28
16	Brisbane Lions	22	5	16	1	1860	2453	75.8	22

Rules for classification: 1. premiership points; 2. percentage; 3. points for
Average score: 93.6
Source: AFL Tables

== Progression by round ==
Numbers highlighted in green indicate that the team finished the round inside the top 8.
Numbers highlighted in blue indicates the team finished first on the ladder in that round.
Numbers highlighted in red indicates the team finished in last place on the ladder in that round.

Team ╲ Round	1	2	3	4	5	6	7	8	9	10	11	12	13	14	15	16	17	18	19	20	21	22
North Melbourne	4	4	8	12	12	16	16	20	24	24	28	28	28	32	36	40	44	48	52	56	60	64
Western Bulldogs	4	8	12	16	16	20	24	28	32	32	36	40	40	40	44	48	48	52	52	56	60	60
Sydney	4	8	12	16	20	20	24	24	28	28	28	28	32	32	36	40	44	48	52	52	52	56
Melbourne	0	4	8	12	16	20	20	24	24	24	28	28	28	32	32	36	36	40	44	48	52	56
Adelaide	0	4	4	4	8	8	12	12	16	20	20	24	28	32	36	36	36	40	44	48	48	52
St Kilda	4	4	8	12	16	20	20	24	24	28	32	36	40	44	44	48	48	48	48	48	52	52
West Coast	0	4	8	8	8	8	8	12	16	20	24	28	30	32	32	36	36	40	44	48	48	48
Essendon	0	4	8	8	8	8	8	12	16	20	24	24	24	24	28	32	36	40	44	48	48	48
Richmond	4	4	8	8	12	12	16	20	20	24	24	28	28	32	36	36	40	40	44	44	48	48
Port Adelaide	0	4	4	8	8	12	16	16	20	20	20	22	26	30	30	30	34	34	34	34	38	38
Carlton	4	4	4	4	4	4	4	4	4	8	8	12	12	16	16	20	24	24	24	28	32	36
Geelong	0	4	4	4	4	8	12	16	20	24	24	28	28	28	28	28	28	28	32	32	32	36
Hawthorn	0	0	0	0	4	4	8	8	8	8	8	8	12	12	12	12	12	16	20	24	28	32
Collingwood	4	4	4	8	12	16	16	16	16	20	20	20	20	20	24	28	28	28	28	28	28	28
Fremantle	4	4	4	8	12	12	12	12	16	16	20	20	24	24	24	24	28	28	28	28	28	28
Brisbane Lions	0	0	0	0	0	4	8	8	8	8	8	10	14	18	18	18	18	18	18	18	18	22

== Finals series ==
=== Qualifying finals ===
Home team	Score	Away team	Score	Venue	Attendance	Date
North Melbourne	11.16 (82)	Essendon	8.12 (60)	MCG	71,154	Friday, 4 September
Melbourne	17.13 (115)	Adelaide	9.13 (67)	MCG	60,817	Saturday, 5 September
Sydney	12.17 (89)	St Kilda	13.9 (87)	SCG	36,076	Saturday, 5 September
Western Bulldogs	18.13 (121)	West Coast	7.9 (51)	MCG	43,025	Sunday, 6 September

=== Semi finals ===
Home team	Score	Away team	Score	Venue	Attendance	Date
Melbourne	15.17 (107)	St Kilda	7.14 (56)	MCG	88,456	Saturday, 12 September
Sydney	10.7 (67)	Adelaide	14.10 (94)	SCG	37,498	Saturday, 12 September

=== Preliminary finals ===
Home team	Score	Away team	Score	Venue	Attendance	Date
North Melbourne	17.12 (114)	Melbourne	12.12 (84)	MCG	73,719	Friday, 18 September
Western Bulldogs	13.15 (93)	Adelaide	24.17 (161)	MCG	67,557	Saturday, 19 September

=== Grand final ===
Home team	Score	Away team	Score	Venue	Attendance	Date
Adelaide	15.15 (105)	North Melbourne	8.22 (70)	MCG	94,431	Saturday, 26 September

== Attendance ==
Team	Hosted	Average	Highest	Lowest	Total	Last season	+/-
Essendon	11	54,894	83,773	26,241	603,830	52,848	+ 2046
Collingwood	11	49,399	81,542	23,188	543,391	48,708	+ 691
Richmond	11	44,307	70,200	25,723	487,377	34,515	+ 9792
Adelaide	11	41,245	46,850	38,430	453,696	40,173	+ 1072
Melbourne	11	40,085	76,387	16,518	440,931	27,714	+ 12,371
St Kilda	11	36,231	71,488	20,063	398,543	35,232	+ 999
North Melbourne	11	35,791	68,050	11,321	393,703	32,520	+ 3271
West Coast Eagles	11	34,199	37,920	27,059	376,194	32,582	+ 1617
Carlton	11	32,634	69,963	16,058	358,971	33,634	1000
Hawthorn	11	32,173	41,780	18,698	353,902	32,380	207
Port Adelaide	11	31,799	41,476	28,167	349,794	35,829	4030
Sydney	11	31,549	36,505	25,951	347,034	35,818	4269
Geelong	11	28,371	61,089	19,449	312,078	28,324	+ 47
Western Bulldogs	11	23,832	36,428	16,131	262,153	19,335	+ 4497
Fremantle	11	23,104	34,710	17,452	254,143	21,982	+ 1122
Brisbane Lions	11	16,675	19,509	14,738	183,424	19,550	2875
Totals	176	34,768	83,773	11,321	6,119,164	33,197	+ 1571

Venue	Hosted	Average	Highest	Lowest	Total	Last season	+/-
MCG	55	47,585	83,773	16,518	2617,182	43,488	+ 4097
Football Park	22	36,522	46,850	28,167	803,490	38,001	1479
Waverley Park	26	34,549	71,488	18,698	898,269	33,806	+ 743
SCG	11	31,549	36,505	25,951	347,034	35,818	4269
Subiaco Oval	16	29,800	37,920	17,452	476,798	28,371	+ 1429
WACA	6	25,590	28,193	22,037	153,539	23,578	+ 2012
Kardinia Park	9	23,307	26,879	19,449	209,767	21,269	+ 2038
Victoria Park	2	23,241	23,293	23,188	46,481	24,473	1233
Optus Oval	17	21,874	27,659	16,058	371,859	20,781	+ 1093
Gabba	11	16,675	19,509	14,738	183,424	19,550	2875
Manuka Oval	1	11,321	11,321	11,321	11,321	N/A	N/A
Totals	176	34,768	83,773	11,321	6,119,164	33,197	1571

== Awards ==
- The Brownlow Medal was awarded to Robert Harvey of St Kilda
- The Leigh Matthews Trophy was awarded to Wayne Carey of North Melbourne
- The Coleman Medal was awarded to Tony Lockett of Sydney
- The Norm Smith Medal was awarded to Andrew McLeod of Adelaide
- The AFL Rising Star award was awarded to Byron Pickett of North Melbourne
- The Wooden Spoon was "awarded" to Brisbane Lions

== Notes ==
- Adelaide became the first club since the introduction of the final five in 1972 to win the premiership from outside the top four, despite losing their first final heavily against Melbourne.
- Sydney's 101-point loss to St Kilda in round 10 was, until round 21, 2024, the last time that the club had lost a premiership match by 100 points or more. The Swans enjoyed a 26-year run without a triple-figure margin loss in the intervention.
