= 2024 Adelaide Football Club season =

Adelaide Crows AFL season

Adelaide Football Club
2024 AFL season
- Coach: Matthew Nicks
- Captain: Jordan Dawson
- Home ground: Adelaide Oval
- Home & Away: 15th (8-1-14)
- Finals: DNQ
- Leading goalkicker: Darcy Fogarty (41 goals)
- Highest home attendance: 52,106 (round 8)
- Lowest home attendance: 29,802 (round 16)
- Average home attendance: 41,421

The 2024 Adelaide Football Club season was the club's 34th season of senior competition in the Australian Football League (AFL).

It was the Crows' second season captained by Jordan Dawson and their fifth year coached by Matthew Nicks. The senior men's season, held between March 16 and August 24, finished with only 8 wins from 23 matches, with the team failing to qualify for finals. The women's side played their ninth season in the AFLW in 2024, for the first time under co-captains Sarah Allan and Ebony Marinoff. The Crows won 8 of their 11 matches, but lost a preliminary final for the third consecutive year. The reserves side played their tenth season in the SANFL in 2024, and their first captained by Jack Madgen. After 8 wins, the SANFL side narrowly missed out on finals only a year after consecutive preliminary finals exits.

== Overview ==
Adelaide's 2024 season overview
| League | Captain | Coach | Home ground | W-D-L | Ladder | Finals | Best and fairest | Leading goalkicker |
|---|---|---|---|---|---|---|---|---|
| AFL | Jordan Dawson | Matthew Nicks | Adelaide Oval | 8-1-14 | 15th | DNQ | Jordan Dawson, Ben Keays | Darcy Fogarty (41) |
| AFLW | Sarah Allan, Ebony Marinoff | Matthew Clarke | Norwood Oval, Unley Oval | 8-0-3 | 4th | Preliminary finals | Ebony Marinoff | Caitlin Gould (20) |
| SANFL | Jack Madgen | Michael Godden | —N/a | 8-0-10 | 6th | DNQ | Kieran Strachan | Lachlan Gollant (29) |

=== Kits ===
Manufacturer: O'Neills
Sponsors: Toyota, Hungry Jack's, Crypto.com

| Home | Clash | Gather Round |

== Men's squad ==
Adelaide Football Club
| Senior list | | Rookie list | Coaching staff |
|---|---|---|---|
| 1 Chayce Jones; 2 Ben Keays (vc); 3 Sam Berry; 4 Lachlan Murphy; 5 Matt Crouch; 6 Daniel Curtin; 7 Riley Thilthorpe; 8 Josh Rachele; 9 Rory Sloane; 10 Luke Pedlar; 11 Charlie Edwards; 12 Jordan Dawson (c); 13 Taylor Walker; 14 Jake Soligo; 15 Brayden Cook; 16 Max Michalanney; 19 Zac Taylor; 20 Mitch Hinge; 21 Chris Burgess; 22 Oscar Ryan | 23 Izak Rankine; 24 Josh Worrell; 25 Ned McHenry; 26 Harry Schoenberg; 27 Luke Nankervis; 28 Nick Murray; 29 Rory Laird; 30 Wayne Milera; 31 Billy Dowling; 32 Darcy Fogarty; 33 Brodie Smith (vc); 34 Elliott Himmelberg; 38 Lachlan Sholl; 40 Hugh Bond; 41 Jordon Butts; 43 Reilly O'Brien (vc); 44 Lachlan Gollant; 45 Kieran Strachan; 48 Mark Keane | 17 Will Hamill; 35 James Borlase; 36 Karl Gallagher (B); 37 Patrick Parnell; 39 Toby Murray | Head coach: Matthew Nicks; Assistant coaches: Scott Burns (senior assistant & forwards); Nathan van Berlo (midfield); Jack Hombsch (defence); Sam Baulderstone (ruck); Michael Godden (SANFL coach); Matthew Wright (development); Matthew Panos (development); Chelsea Randall (development); Andrew McPherson (development); Legend: (c) Captain(s); (vc) Vice-captain(s); (B) - Category B rookie; italics - Inactive player list; Long-term injury; Updated: 13 June 2026; Source(s): Senior list, Rookie list, Coaching staff, Injuries |

=== Coaching staff ===
| Role | Name | Notes | Ref. |
|---|---|---|---|
| Head coach | Matthew Nicks | | |
| Assistant coaches | Scott Burns (forwards) | Senior assistant | |
| Assistant coaches | Nathan Van Berlo (midfielders) | | |
| Assistant coaches | Jack Hombsch (defence) | | |
| Assistant coaches | Sam Baulderstone (rucks) | | |
| Development coaches | Marco Bello | Head of development | |
| Development coaches | Michael Godden | Current head coach of Adelaide's SANFL team. | |
| Development coaches | Andrew McPherson | | |
| Development coaches | Chelsea Randall | Current player with Adelaide's women's team. | |
| Development coaches | Matthew Wright | Academy development | |

=== Squad changes ===
The following off-season changes were made to the squad prior to the 2024 season.

==== Out ====
| No. | Name | Position | New Club | via | Ref. |
|---|---|---|---|---|---|
| 3 | (Victoria (state)) Fischer McAsey | Key defender / utility | St Kilda City (SFNL) | Retirement | |
| 11 | (South Australia) Paul Seedsman | Wingman | —N/a | Retirement | |
| 39 | (Victoria (state)) Tom Doedee | Key defender | Brisbane Lions | Restricted free agent | |
| 23 | (Western Australia) Shane McAdam | Small forward | Melbourne | Trade | |
| 21 | (Victoria (state)) Tyler Brown | Midfielder | Box Hill (VFL) | Delisted | |
| 6 | (Australian Capital Territory) Jackson Hately | Midfielder | Essendon (VFL) | Delisted | |
| 36 | (Victoria (state)) Andrew McPherson | Defender | —N/a | Delisted | |
| 42 | (South Australia) Tariek Newchurch | Small forward | North Adelaide (SANFL) | Delisted | |
| 38 | (Egypt) James Borlase | Key defender | Adelaide | Delisted | |
| 17 | (Victoria (state)) Will Hamill | Half-back / wingman | Adelaide | Delisted | |

==== In ====
| No. | Name | Position | Previous club | via | Ref. |
|---|---|---|---|---|---|
| 21 | (South Australia) Chris Burgess | Key forward / utility | Gold Coast | Trade | |
| 6 | (Western Australia) Daniel Curtin | Key defender / utility | Claremont | No. 8, 2023 national draft, | |
| 11 | (Victoria (state)) Charlie Edwards | Midfielder | Sandringham Dragons | No. 21, 2023 national draft | |
| 22 | (Victoria (state)) Oscar Ryan | Medium defender | Murray Bushrangers | No. 27, 2023 national draft | |
| 17 | (Victoria (state)) Will Hamill | Half-back / wingman | Adelaide | No. 9, 2024 rookie draft | |
| 38 | (Egypt) James Borlase | Key defender | Adelaide | No. 20, 2024 rookie draft | |
| 36 | (Republic of Ireland) Karl Gallagher | Medium defender | Monaghan GAA | Category B rookie signing | |

== Men's AFL season ==
=== Pre-season matches ===
Adelaide's 2024 practice match and AFL Community Series fixtures
| Date and local time | Opponent | Scores | | | Venue | Ref. |
| Date and local time | Opponent | Home | Away | Result | Venue | Ref. |
|---|---|---|---|---|---|---|
| Friday, 23 February (5:00 pm) | Port Adelaide | 14.9 (93) | 14.9 (93) | Match drawn | Alberton Oval | |
| Saturday, 2 March (2:40 pm) | West Coast | 17.15 (117) | 7.8 (50) | Won by 67 points | Richmond Oval | |

=== Regular season ===
Adelaide's 2024 AFL season fixture
| Round | Date and local time | Opponent | Home | Away | Result | Venue | Attendance | Ladder position | Ref. |
| Round | Date and local time | Opponent | Scores | | | Venue | Attendance | Ladder position | Ref. |
| 0 | Bye | | | | | | | | |
|---|---|---|---|---|---|---|---|---|---|
| 1 | Saturday, 16 March (7:10 pm) | Gold Coast | 8.12 (60) | 8.6 (54) | Lost by 6 points | Carrara Stadium (A) | 11,466 | 10th | |
| 2 | Friday, 22 March (7:10 pm) | Geelong | 11.11 (77) | 14.12 (96) | Lost by 19 points | Adelaide Oval (H) | 44,758 | 13th ▼ | |
| 3 | Friday, 29 March (4:20 pm) | Fremantle | 9.15 (69) | 4.10 (34) | Lost by 35 points | Perth Stadium (A) | 51,037 | 15th ▼ | |
| 4 | Thursday, 4 April (7:10 pm) | Melbourne | 8.15 (63) | 10.18 (78) | Lost by 15 points | Adelaide Oval (N) | 48,020 | 15th | |
| 5 | Saturday, 13 April (4:35 pm) | Carlton | 14.14 (98) | 16.4 (100) | Won by 2 points | Docklands Stadium (A) | 46,284 | 14th ▲ | |
| 6 | Friday, 19 April (7:10 pm) | Essendon | 11.9 (75) | 10.18 (78) | Lost by 3 points | Adelaide Oval (H) | 46,700 | 15th ▼ | |
| 7 | Saturday, 27 April (1:45 pm) | North Melbourne | 12.9 (81) | 20.18 (138) | Won by 57 points | Bellerive Oval (A) | 4,727 | 12th ▲ | |
| 8 | Thursday, 2 May (7:00 pm) | Port Adelaide | 12.6 (78) | 5.18 (48) | Won by 30 points | Adelaide Oval (H) | 52,106 | 12th | |
| 9 | Sunday, 12 May (3:30 pm) | Brisbane Lions | 13.12 (90) | 13.12 (90) | Match drawn | Adelaide Oval (H) | 40,278 | 12th | |
| 10 | Saturday, 18 May (1:45 pm) | Collingwood | 12.6 (78) | 11.8 (74) | Lost by 4 points | Melbourne Cricket Ground (A) | 63,935 | 13th ▼ | |
| 11 | Sunday, 26 May (4:10 pm) | West Coast | 21.11 (137) | 5.8 (38) | Won by 99 points | Adelaide Oval (H) | 40,965 | 12th ▲ | |
| 12 | Saturday, 1 Jun (1:45 pm) | Hawthorn | 16.11 (106) | 12.8 (80) | Lost by 27 points | Melbourne Cricket Ground (A) | 36,086 | 14th ▼ | |
| 13 | Thursday, 6 June (7:00 pm) | Richmond | 10.11 (71) | 12.7 (79) | Lost by 8 points | Adelaide Oval (H) | 37,342 | 15th ▼ | |
| 14 | Saturday, 15 June (7:00 pm) | Sydney | 10.7 (67) | 16.13 (109) | Lost by 42 points | Adelaide Oval (H) | 41,535 | 15th | |
| 15 | Bye | | | | | | | 15th | Bye |
| 16 | Saturday, 29 June (7:00 pm) | Greater Western Sydney | 13.16 (94) | 12.6 (78) | Won by 16 points | Adelaide Oval (H) | 29,802 | 14th ▲ | |
| 17 | Sunday, 7 July (4:10 pm) | Brisbane Lions | 14.13 (97) | 13.8 (86) | Lost by 11 points | The Gabba (A) | 30,183 | 15th ▼ | |
| 18 | Saturday, 13 July (7:00 pm) | St Kilda | 10.11 (71) | 5.9 (39) | Won by 32 points | Adelaide Oval (H) | 34,549 | 14th ▲ | |
| 19 | Friday, 19 July (7:40 pm) | Essendon | 17.11 (113) | 17.13 (115) | Won by 2 points | Docklands Stadium (A) | 36,020 | 14th | |
| 20 | Sunday, 28 July (3:40 pm) | Hawthorn | 8.10 (58) | 19.10 (124) | Lost by 66 points | Adelaide Oval (H) | 41,823 | 15th ▼ | |
| 21 | Saturday, 3 August (4:35 pm) | Geelong | 13.12 (90) | 13.7 (85) | Lost by 5 points | Kardinia Park (A) | 28,000 | 15th | |
| 22 | Sunday, 11 August (3:40 pm) | Western Bulldogs | 17.9 (111) | 9.18 (72) | Won by 39 points | Adelaide Oval (H) | 39,177 | 15th | |
| 23 | Saturday, 17 August (7:00 pm) | Port Adelaide | 11.14 (80) | 8.10 (58) | Lost by 22 points | Adelaide Oval (A) | 52,459 | 15th | |
| 24 | Saturday, 24 August (7:40 pm) | Sydney | 18.13 (121) | 13.12 (90) | Lost by 31 points | Sydney Cricket Ground (A) | 36,491 | 15th | |

Home and away match summaries

==== Round 1 ====
Adelaide lost their first game of the 2024 AFL season to Gold Coast by 6 points in wet weather conditions. Gold Coast led for the entire match and Adelaide looked very poor, until a late fourth-quarter comeback spearheaded by Josh Rachele and former Sun Izak Rankine gave the Crows a glimpse of hope. Chris Burgess played his first game for the club after being traded from Gold Coast to Adelaide in the 2023 trade period.

Round 1
Saturday, 16 March (7:10 pm) | Gold Coast | def. | Adelaide | People First Stadium (crowd: 11,466) | Report
3.2 (20); 5.4 (34); 7.9 (51); 8.12 (60) | Q1; Q2; Q3; Final | 1.1 (7); 1.2 (8); 3.4 (22); 8.6 (54) | Umpires: Howorth, Meredith, Jones, McGinness; Brownlow Votes: 3 Rowell, 2 Miller, 1 Ballard; Television broadcast: Channel 7 (SA) / Fox Footy
2: Ainsworth, Rosas Jr; 1: Humphrey, Rowell, Anderson, T. Berry | Goals | 3: Rachele; 2: Keays, Rankine; 1: S. Berry
Flanders, Anderson, Miller, Rowell | Best | Crouch, Laird, Worrell, Rachele
Nil | Injuries | Pedlar (nose), Butts (foot)
Budarick (rough conduct), Rosas Jr (headbutt) | Reports | Nil
Chris Burgess club debut

==== Round 2 ====
Round 2 marked Adelaide's first game scheduled on a Friday in almost two years. Adelaide came into this game as favourites, despite losing their opening game and Geelong winning theirs. However, Adelaide lost by 19 points with another late comeback falling short due to wasted chances in front of goal.

Round 2
Friday, 22 March (7:10 pm) | Adelaide | def. by | Geelong | Adelaide Oval (crowd: 44,758) | Report
3.2 (20); 5.5 (35); 8.7 (55); 11.11 (77) | Q1; Q2; Q3; Final | 6.3 (39); 7.5 (47); 12.7 (79); 14.12 (96) | Umpires: Rosebury, Stephens, Fleer, Gianfagna; Brownlow Votes: 3 Stewart, 2 Miers, 1 Crouch; Television broadcast: Channel 7 / Fox Footy
2: Walker, Rankine, Fogarty, Burgess; 1: Soligo, Rachele, O'Brien | Goals | 4: Hawkins; 3: Miers; 2: O. Henry, Cameron; 1: Stengle, Mannagh, Close
Crouch, Dawson, Hinge, Laird, Worrell, O'Brien | Best | Stewart, Miers, Dangerfield, Hawkins, Blicavs, Holmes
Nil | Injuries | Dangerfield (hamstring)
Nil | Reports | Parfitt (tripping)
Lachlan Murphy 100th game

==== Round 3 ====
This was Adelaide's first time playing against Fremantle in Perth since 2019. Competitive for most of the game, Adelaide were overrun in the final quarter to lose by 35 points.

Round 3
Friday, 29 March (4:20 pm) | Fremantle | def. | Adelaide | Optus Stadium (crowd: 51,037) | Report
2.2 (14); 4.7 (31); 5.12 (42); 9.15 (69) | Q1; Q2; Q3; Final | 2.5 (17); 3.5 (23); 4.8 (32); 4.10 (34) | Umpires: Haussen, Deboy, Dore, Rebeschini; Brownlow Votes: 3 Young, 2 Pearce, 1 Ryan; Television broadcast: Channel 7 (SA) / Fox Footy
2: Amiss, Taberner, Walters; 1: Treacy, Frederick, Banfield | Goals | 1: Burgess, Sholl, McHenry, Keays
Young, Pearce, Ryan, Clark, Fyfe, Walters | Best | Crouch, Keane, Soligo, Laird, Dawson
Nil | Injuries | Milera (knee), Murphy (knee)
Brodie Smith 250th game

==== Round 4 ====
For the second consecutive year, Adelaide hosted the opening game of Gather Round, this time hosting Melbourne. The final margin of 15 points was flattering to the Crows, who were comprehensively defeated across the ground thanks to former Crow Simon Goodwin's coaching. Christian Petracca was the best player on the ground, while young Jake Soligo was impressive for Adelaide.

Round 4 (Gather Round)
Thursday, 4 April (7:10 pm) | Adelaide | def. by | Melbourne | Adelaide Oval (crowd: 48,020) | Report
2.5 (17); 3.8 (25); 6.9 (45); 8.15 (63) | Q1; Q2; Q3; Final | 2.0 (12); 6.7 (43); 10.13 (73); 10.18 (78) | Umpires: Meredith, Williamson, Fleer, Rodger; Brownlow Votes: 3 Petracca, 2 Fritsch, 1 Crouch; Television broadcast: Channel 7 / Fox Footy
2: Fogarty; 1: Rankine, Laird, Walker, Keays, Dawson, Rachele | Goals | 3: Fritsch; 2: Pickett, van Rooyen; 1: Petty, Petracca, Chandler
Soligo, Dawson, Laird, Keane | Best | Petracca, Gawn, May, Fritsch, McVee, Lever
Parnell (shoulder) | Injuries | Nil
Nil | Reports | van Rooyen (striking), Pickett (rough conduct)
Adelaide's winning record up to this point of the season is their worst since 2020.

==== Round 5 ====
Adelaide won their first game of the season in round 5, largely credited to Matthew Nicks and the variety in his midfield, rotating players such as Jordan Dawson and Rory Laird out and Jake Soligo and Izak Rankine in. Lachlan Gollant was substituted off for the fourth quarter and replaced by Sam Berry, who kicked the winning goal with just over a minute of regulation time remaining. This was Adelaide's first win in Melbourne since 2021.

Round 5
Saturday, 13 April (4:35 pm) | Carlton | def. by | Adelaide | Marvel Stadium (crowd: 46,283) | Report
5.1 (31); 8.2 (50); 11.9 (75); 14.14 (98) | Q1; Q2; Q3; Final | 4.0 (24); 7.2 (44); 12.3 (75); 16.4 (100) | Umpires: Rosebury, Williamson, Dore, Adair; Brownlow Votes: 3 Walsh, 2 Soligo, 1 Rankine; Television broadcast: Channel 7 (SA) / Fox Footy
4: Curnow; 2: McKay; 1: Pittonet, Owies, E. Hollands, Fantasia, Durdin, Cripps, Cottrell, Acres | Goals | 4: Walker; 3: Rankine, Keays; 2: Rachele; 1: Gollant, Dawson, Cook, Berry
Walsh, Curnow, McKay, Cripps, Acres | Best | Rankine, Soligo, Walker, Keays, Rachele, Hinge
Cerra (hamstring, replaced in side by Pittonet), Saad (hamstring), McGovern (hamstring) | Injuries | Butts (hamstring)
Nil | Reports | Dawson, Crouch (rough conduct)
Adelaide's first win in Melbourne since 2021.

==== Round 6 ====
For the third time in less than a year, a late non-decision from the umpires cost Adelaide a chance at winning the game (the first against Collingwood, and the second most famously against Sydney). The morning following the game, the AFL conceded that a free kick should have been awarded to Taylor Walker for a tackle laid on Sam Draper, giving Walker a chance to kick a goal after the siren and win the game. Walker acknowledged that the umpiring decision was frustrating, but also concedes that the Crows' performance was "unacceptable".

Round 6
Friday, 19 April (7:10 pm) | Adelaide | def. by | Essendon | Adelaide Oval (crowd: 46,700) | Report
2.2 (14); 5.4 (34); 9.5 (59); 11.9 (75) | Q1; Q2; Q3; Final | 2.4 (16); 5.9 (39); 8.14 (62); 10.18 (78) | Umpires: Haussen, Stevic, Toner, Adair; Brownlow Votes: 3 Merrett, 2 Martin, 1 Dawson; Television broadcast: Channel 7 / Fox Footy
2: Dawson, Keays; 1: Walker, Jones, Fogarty, Soligo, Rachele, McHenry, Rankine | Goals | 2: Jones, Langford; 1: Gresham, Parish, Hobbs, Stringer, Merrett, Martin
Dawson, Soligo, Hinge, O'Brien | Best | Merrett, Martin, Caldwell, Hobbs, Gresham
Berry (foot) | Injuries | None
Rankine (rough conduct), Keane (tripping), Dawson (umpire contact) | Reports | None

==== Round 7 ====
Round 7 (AFL ANZAC Appeal Round)
Saturday, 27 April (1:45 pm) | North Melbourne | def. by | Adelaide | Blundstone Arena (crowd: 4,727) | Report
2.3 (15); 6.4 (40); 7.7 (49); 12.9 (81) | Q1; Q2; Q3; Final | 5.5 (35); 11.9 (79); 16.12 (108); 20.18 (138) | Umpires: O'Gorman, Brown, Rebeschini, Jones; ANZAC Spirit Award: Jordan Dawson; Brownlow Votes: 3 Laird, 2 Dawson, 1 Rankine; Television broadcast: Channel 7 (SA) / Fox Footy
3: Zurhaar; 2: Larkey, Duursma; 1: Wardlaw, Tucker, Powell, Lazzaro, Davies-Uniacke | Goals | 4: Rankine; 3: Cook; 2: Walker, Keays, Himmelberg; 1: Sholl, Pedlar, McHenry, Laird, Jones, Fogarty, Dawson
Sheezel, McKercher, Davies-Uniacke, Xerri | Best | Dawson, Laird, Sholl, Cook, Walker
Nil | Injuries | Pedlar (shoulder)
Mitch Hinge 50th game

==== Round 8 ====
Draftee Dan Curtin made his long-awaited AFL debut, while Smith and Butts returned from injury. Prior to the game, the all-time Showdown record was tied at 27 apiece. The game commemorated Rory Sloane, who had announced his retirement earlier in the week. Adelaide's home attendance of 52,106 was their biggest home attendance since 2016.

Round 8 (Showdown LV)
Thursday, 2 May (7:00 pm) | Adelaide | def. | Port Adelaide | Adelaide Oval (crowd: 52,106) | Report
5.0 (30); 7.2 (44); 9.4 (58); 12.6 (78) | Q1; Q2; Q3; Final | 3.4 (22); 3.7 (25); 4.11 (35); 5.18 (48) | Umpires: Foot, Fisher, Stevic, Deboy; Showdown Medal: Jake Soligo; Brownlow Votes: 3 Soligo, 2 Butters, 1 Crouch; Television broadcast: Channel 7 / Fox Footy
3: Rankine; 2: Fogarty, Walker; 1: Cook, Keays, McHenry, Rachele, Sholl | Goals | 2: Horne-Francis; 1: Dixon, Marshall, Rioli
Soligo, Rankine, Crouch, Michalanney, Worrell, Walker | Best | Horne-Francis, Wines, Butters, Bergman
Nil | Injuries | Georgiades (knee), Jones (leg), Rozee (hamstring), Marshall (ankle)
Rachele (umpire contact) | Reports | Nil
Dan Curtin AFL debut; Matt Crouch 150th game

==== Round 9 ====
The last three minutes were played with scores level, and the game ended in a draw — the second of the 2024 AFL season. It was Adelaide's first draw since 2017 (which was against Collingwood at the MCG), their first at home, and the third in their history. It was Brisbane's first since 2009.

Round 9
Sunday, 12 May (3:30 pm) | Adelaide | drew with | Brisbane Lions | Adelaide Oval (crowd: 40,278) | Report
3.5 (23); 6.9 (45); 9.11 (65); 13.12 (90) | Q1; Q2; Q3; Final | 4.2 (26); 6.7 (43); 9.10 (64); 13.12 (90) | Umpires: Haussen, Fleer, Dore, McGinness; Brownlow Votes: 3 Rankine, 2 Dawson, 1 Zorko; Television broadcast: Channel 7 (SA) / Fox Footy
4: Fogarty; 3: Rankine; 2: Walker, Himmelberg; 1: Rachele, Sholl | Goals | 4: Ah Chee; 2: Morris; 1: Cameron, Hipwood, Lohmann, McCluggage, Daniher, Berry, Dunkley
Dawson, Rankine, Fogarty, Soligo, Crouch, Laird | Best | Andrews, McCluggage, Dunkley, Payne, Berry
Worrell (arm) | Injuries | Nil
Keane (striking) | Reports | Prior (umpire contact)
The draw marks the first drawn home game in the club's history, and the club's third draw overall.

==== Round 10 ====
Izak Rankine, who designed the Indigenous guernsey worn, starred with 30 disposals and a late goal of the year contender dribbled from the boundary, but a Jordan De Goey set shot was the winning score for Collingwood. With less than 30 seconds left, Rankine kicked the ball inside the forward 50, but was pinged for running too far. Controversy stirred as fans began to think it was the fourth game-costing decision in less than a year, but Fox Footy measured that Rankine did indeed run farther than his allocated 15 meters.

Round 10 (Sir Doug Nicholls Round)
Saturday, 18 May (1:45 pm) | Collingwood | v | Kuwarna | MCG (crowd: 63,935) | Report
4.2 (26); 8.2 (50); 11.4 (70); 12.6 (78) | Q1; Q2; Q3; Final | 3.1 (19); 6.3 (39); 8.5 (53); 11.8 (74) | Umpires: Donlon, Power, Toner, Heffernan; Brownlow Votes: 3 De Goey, 2 N. Daicos, 1 Noble; Television broadcast: Channel 7 (SA) / Fox Footy
2: Pendlebury, McInnes, De Goey; 1: Schultz, Richards, Noble, Hill, Hoskin-Elliot, Crisp | Goals | 2: Rachele, Fogarty; 1: Walker, Sholl, Murphy, Himmelberg, Cook, Rankine, Hinge
N. Daicos, Pendlebury, De Goey, Crisp, Noble, J. Daicos | Best | Rankine, Dawson, Crouch, Hinge, Keane, Soligo
Hoskin-Elliot (hamstring), McInnes (concussion) | Injuries | Rankine (hamstring)
Sullivan (umpire contact) | Reports | Crouch (umpire contact)
The attendance of 63,925 is Kuwarna's second highest-ever home-and-away attendance. Only the 2023 equivalent fixture against Collingwood at the MCG had a higher attendance.

==== Round 11 ====
Kuwarna dominated this match, and despite the effort and talent of number-one draft pick Harley Reid, Kuwarna dominated until the final siren, falling short of a 100-point margin by mere seconds.

Round 11 (Sir Doug Nicholls Round)
Saturday, 26 May (4:10 pm) | Kuwarna | def. | Waalitj Marawar | Adelaide Oval (crowd: 40,965) | Report
7.4 (46); 13.5 (83); 18.9 (117); 21.11 (137) | Q1; Q2; Q3; Final | 0.2 (2); 3.5 (23); 4.7 (31); 5.8 (38) | Umpires: Foot, Gavine, Whetton, Jones; Brownlow Votes: 3 Dawson, 2 O'Brien, 1 Laird; Television broadcast: Channel 7 (SA) / Fox Footy
3: Jones; 2: Walker, Rachele, Fogarty, Keays, Dawson, Cook; 1: Soligo, Sholl, Schoenberg, O'Brien, Murphy, Burgess | Goals | 1: J. Williams, Waterman, Reid, Darling, Cripps
Dawson, Sholl, Jones, Fogarty, Laird, Crouch | Best | Kelly, McGovern, Yeo, Reid, Barrass
Nil | Reports | Hough (tripping)

==== Round 12 ====
Hawthorn kicked the first four goals of the game, and the Crows were not able to regain a lead, extending their winless streak at the MCG (starting in 2017 and spanning nine games) until at least 2025. Matthew Nicks described the loss as "as bad as we've played all year".

Round 12
Saturday, 1 June (1:45 pm) | Hawthorn | def. | Adelaide | MCG (crowd: 36,086) | Report
5.4 (34); 7.5 (47); 12.9 (81); 16.11 (107) | Q1; Q2; Q3; Final | 2.2 (14); 2.6 (18); 7.6 (48); 12.8 (80) | Umpires: Dalgleish, Meredith, Dore, Bailes; Brownlow Votes: 3 Moore, 2 Newcombe, 1 Day; Television broadcast: Channel 7 (SA) / Fox Footy
5: Moore; 3: Gunston; 2: Ginnivan; 1: Reeves, Nash, Macdonald, Hardwick, Dear, Breust | Goals | 3: Cook, Burgess; 2: Fogarty; 1: Sholl, Schoenberg, Murphy, Jones
Moore, Day, Ginnivan, Newcombe, D'Ambrosio, Scrimshaw | Best | Crouch, Hinge, Soligo, Borlase, Sholl, O'Brien
Nil | Injuries | Walker (back), Crouch (shoulder)
Jiath (headbutt) | Reports | Nil

==== Round 13 ====
Debutant Billy Dowling, James Borlase, and Strachan all kicked their first AFL goals, but five goals in a row for the 17th-seeded Richmond in the third quarter was too much to overcome. The performance resulted in heavy scrutiny towards Matthew Nicks and the entire club. Leigh Montagna agreed with coach Nicks' comments that the Crow's performance was "clearly lacking confident after a disappointing showing."

Round 13
Thursday, 6 June (7:00 pm) | Adelaide | def. by | Richmond | Adelaide Oval (crowd: 37,342) | Report
2.4 (16); 5.6 (36); 7.8 (50); 10.11 (71) | Q1; Q2; Q3; Final | 3.4 (22); 5.5 (35); 11.6 (72); 12.7 (79) | Umpires: Haussen, Hosking, Fleer, Bailes; Brownlow Votes: 3 Dawson, 2 Bolton, 1 Short; Television broadcast: Channel 7 / Fox Footy
3: Fogarty; 2: Rachele; 1: Strachan, Schoenberg, Murphy, Dowling, Borlase | Goals | 3: Cumberland; 2: McIntosh, Mansell, Campbell; 1: Baker, Broad, Koschitzke
Michalanney, Nankervis, Dawson, Hinge, Keane, Fogarty | Best | Baker, Short, Nankervis, Brown, Balta, Bolton
Strachan (groin) | Injuries | Prestia (calf)
Nil | Reports | Koschitzke (striking)
Billy Dowling AFL debut; Jake Soligo 50th game

==== Round 14 ====
Joel Amartey of the Swans, whose previous best goal tally was four, kicked four in the second quarter to keep the Swans in the contest going into half time. He kicked another four in the third quarter, effectively leaving Adelaide behind in the contest. Amartey finished with a career-best nine goals, the most any player had kicked in a game up to that point in the season.

Round 14
Saturday, 15 June (7:00 pm) | Adelaide | def. by | Sydney | Adelaide Oval (crowd: 41,535) | Report
4.2 (26); 7.4 (46); 9.6 (60); 10.7 (67) | Q1; Q2; Q3; Final | 2.3 (15); 6.6 (42); 12.9 (81); 16.13 (109) | Umpires: O'Gorman, Deboy, Brown, Gavine; Brownlow Votes: 3 Amartey, 2 Gulden, 1 Grundy; Television broadcast: Channel 7 / Fox Footy
2: Fogarty, Rankine; 1: Cook, Dawson, Keays, Rachele, Soligo, Sholl | Goals | 9: Amartey; 2: Adams, Heeney; 1: McDonald, Papley, Ch. Warner
Laird, Hinge, Soligo, Rankine, Sholl | Best | Amartey, Grundy, Gulden, Heeney, Adams
Nil | Reports | McLean (rough conduct)

==== Round 15 ====
Bye

==== Round 16 ====
Following the mid-season bye, coach Nicks was confident for the clash against bogey-team Greater Western Sydney, who the Crows had only beaten once up to this point of Nicks' four-year tenure. When defender Chayce Jones suffered an injury at training the day before the game, a late change was made to include Zac Taylor in the game day squad for his debut. He was the substitute, and came on for Brayden Cook at three-quarter-time.

Round 16
Saturday, 29 June (7:00 pm) | Adelaide | def. | Greater Western Sydney | Adelaide Oval (crowd: 29,802) | Report
2.6 (18); 9.9 (63); 10.14 (74); 13.16 (94) | Q1; Q2; Q3; Final | 4.0 (24); 5.0 (30); 8.3 (51); 12.6 (78) | Umpires: Power, Haussen, Dalgleish, Bryce; Brownlow Votes: 3 Dawson, 2 Whitfield, 1 Keays; Television broadcast: Channel 7 (SA) / Fox Footy
3: Fogarty; 2: Keays, Rachele, Rankine, Walker; 1: Dowling, Sholl | Goals | 3: Greene; 2: Hogan, Kelly, Riccardi, Ward; 1: Cumming
Rankine, Keays, Hinge, Dawson, Fogarty, Rachele | Best | Whitfield, Kelly, Ward, Himmelberg, Green, Briggs
Berry (umpire contact) | Reports | Nil
Zac Taylor AFL debut

==== Round 17 ====
An incident involving Izak Rankine and Brandon Starcevich of the Brisbane Lions in the first quarter resulted in a concussion to Starcevich and a four-match ban to Rankine. Adelaide fell short despite a late charge, resulting in another close finish between the two clubs.

Round 17
Sunday, 7 July (4:10 pm) | Brisbane Lions | def. | Adelaide | The Gabba (crowd: 30,183) | Report
4.2 (26); 8.6 (54); 12.7 (79); 14.13 (97) | Q1; Q2; Q3; Final | 2.2 (14); 6.3 (39); 9.5 (59); 13.8 (86) | Umpires: Mollison, Whetton, Bryce, Strybos; Brownlow Votes: 3 Neale, 2 Rayner, 1 Dawson; Television broadcast: Channel 7 (SA) / Fox Footy
3: Neale, Rayner; 2: Cameron; 1: Morris, Lohmann, Hipwood, Dunkley, Ashcroft, Ah Chee | Goals | 4: Keays; 2: Walker, Rankine, Himmelberg, Fogarty; 1: Soligo
Neale, Dunkley, McInerney, Wilmot, Ashcroft | Best | Laird, Keays, Keane, Walker, Sholl, Rankine
Starcevich (concussion) | Injuries | Hinge (adductor)
Nil | Reports | Rankine (rough conduct), Laird, Keays (umpire contact), Keane (tripping)
Sam Berry 50th game; Josh Rachele 50th game

==== Round 18 ====
Adelaide stormed home on a rainy Adelaide night over St Kilda, who scored just one goal in the second half. Riley Thilthorpe, in his first game since being injured pre-season, kicked two final-quarter goals to seal the game.

Round 18
Saturday, 13 July (7:00 pm) | Adelaide | def. | St Kilda | Adelaide Oval (crowd: 34,549) | Report
2.1 (13); 5.5 (35); 6.10 (46); 10.11 (71) | Q1; Q2; Q3; Final | 3.3 (21); 4.7 (31); 5.8 (38); 5.9 (39) | Umpires: Brown, Nicholls, Jones, McGinness; Brownlow Votes: 3 Laird, 2 Dawson, 1 Steele; Television broadcast: Channel 7 / Fox Footy
2: Sholl, Thilthorpe; 1: Dowling, Fogarty, Himmelberg, Keays, Murphy, Rachele | Goals | 2: Sharman, Wood; 1: Phillipou
Dawson, Laird, Sholl, Keays, Taylor | Best | Marshall, Phillipou, Wanganeen-Milera, Clark
Nil | Injuries | Battle (leg)
Berry, Soligo (umpire contact), Rachele (kicking) | Reports | Clark, Jones, Steele (umpire contact)
Hugh Bond AFL debut; Nick Murray 50th game; Ben Keays 100 club games. This milestone also marks a club record, with Keays' 100th consecutive game overtaking Scott Thompson's record of 99 consecutive club games.

==== Round 19 ====
Zac Taylor kicked his first AFL goal as one of eight consecutive second-quarter goals for Adelaide. Essendon responded with the next five goals in a high-scoring affair. Ben Keays, who kicked a career-best five goals, assisted Josh Rachele in kicking a last-minute goal to lead by four points. Adelaide won by two points in an upset victory to keep their slim hopes for finals qualification alive.

Round 19
Friday, 19 July (7:40 pm) | Essendon | def. by | Adelaide | Marvel Stadium (crowd: 36,020) | Report
3.2 (20); 7.5 (47); 15.8 (98); 17.11 (113) | Q1; Q2; Q3; Final | 2.3 (15); 11.4 (70); 13.10 (88); 17.13 (115) | Umpires: Power, Gavine, Findlay, Wallace; Brownlow Votes: 3 Keays, 2 Merrett, 1 Durham; Television broadcast: Channel 7 / Fox Footy
3: Cox; 2: Jones, Caddy, Langford, Gresham; 1: Durham, Stringer, Draper, Caldwell, Merrett, Redman | Goals | 5: Keays; 4: Fogarty; 3: Rachele; 2: Thilthorpe; 1: Dowling, Taylor, Berry
Redman, Merrett, Durham, Langford, Cox | Best | Keays, Laird, Fogarty, Hinge, Soligo
Caldwell (head) | Injuries | Murray (knee), Butts (foot), Dawson (head)
Caddy, Guelfi (rough conduct) | Reports | Keays (rough conduct)
This marks the first time that Adelaide have beaten Essendon under coach Matthew Nicks, and the first time for the club since 2017.

==== Round 20 ====
Round 20
Sunday, 28 July (3:40 pm) | Adelaide | def. by | Hawthorn | Adelaide Oval (crowd: 41,823) | Report
5.6 (36); 6.6 (42); 6.8 (44); 8.10 (58) | Q1; Q2; Q3; Final | 5.0 (30); 9.3 (57); 13.8 (86); 19.10 (124) | Umpires: O'Gorman, Stephens, Brown, Fleer; Brownlow Votes: 3 Day, 2 Newcombe, 1 Macdonald; Television broadcast: Channel 7 (SA) / Fox Footy
3: Walker; 2: Thilthorpe; 1: Rachele, Keays, Murphy | Goals | 2: Watson, Newcombe, Dear, Chol, Sicily, Ginnivan, Breust, Macdonald; 1: Moore, Impey, Day
Soligo, Sholl, Laird, Walker | Best | Day, Newcombe, Impey, Nash, Macdonald
Nil | Injuries | Jiath (shoulder)
Michalanney (striking, melee), Jones, Nankervis (melee) | Reports | Macdonald, Maginness, Watson (melee)
Elliott Himmelberg 50th game

==== Round 21 ====
Round 21
Saturday, 3 August (4:35 pm) | Geelong | def. | Adelaide | Kardinia Park (crowd: 28,939) | Report
3.4 (22); 7.5 (47); 10.8 (68); 13.12 (90) | Q1; Q2; Q3; Final | 2.2 (14); 6.3 (39); 11.5 (71); 13.7 (85) | Umpires: Donlon, Johanson, Brown, Bailes; Brownlow Votes: 3 Cameron, 2 Soligo, 1 Stewart; Television broadcast: Channel 7 (SA) / Fox Footy
6: Cameron; 2: Mannagh; 1: Humphries, O. Henry, Neale, Bruhn, Stengle | Goals | 3: Thilthorpe, Rachele; 2: Walker; 1: Keays, Fogarty, Soligo, Murphy, Sholl
Cameron, Bruhn, Stewart, Atkins, Dangerfield | Best | Dawson, Soligo, Sholl, Rachele, Thilthorpe, O'Brien
De Koning (knee) | Injuries | Nil
Riley Thilthorpe 50th game

==== Round 22 ====
Round 22
Sunday, 11 August (3:40 pm) | Adelaide | def. | Western Bulldogs | Adelaide Oval (crowd: 39,177) | Report
5.2 (32); 9.6 (60); 14.7 (91); 17.9 (111) | Q1; Q2; Q3; Final | 1.4 (16); 4.10 (34); 6.14 (50); 9.18 (72) | Umpires: Haussen, Brown, Howorth, Whetton; Brownlow Votes: 3 Berry, 2 Fogarty, 1 Dawson; Television broadcast: Channel 7 (SA) / Fox Footy
5: Fogarty; 3: Keays; 2: Curtin, Thilthorpe, Rachele; 1: Walker, Rankine, Dawson | Goals | 2: Bontempelli; 1: Ugle-Hagan, Williams, Treloar, Richards, McNeil, English, Darcy
Dawson, Fogarty, Keays, Sholl, Crouch, O'Brien | Best | Bontempelli, Treloar, Liberatore, Darcy, English
Walker (eye) | Injuries | Nil
Nil | Reports | Bontempelli (umpire contact), Duryea (rough conduct)
Darcy Fogarty 100th game

==== Round 23 ====
Round 23 (Showdown LVI)
Saturday, 17 August (7:00 pm) | Port Adelaide | def. | Adelaide | Adelaide Oval (crowd: 52,459) | Report
2.3 (15); 4.9 (33); 6.12 (48); 11.14 (80) | Q1; Q2; Q3; Final | 2.5 (17); 6.6 (42); 6.10 (46); 8.10 (58) | Umpires: Johanson, Stevic, Chamberlain, Hefferman; Showdown Medal: Zak Butters; Brownlow Votes: 3 Butters, 2 Horne-Francis, 1 Crouch; Television broadcast: Channel 7 (SA) / Fox Footy
2: Horne-Francis, Rioli, F. Evans, Byrne-Jones; 1: Boak, Burgoyne, Butters | Goals | 2: Fogarty, Rankine; 1: Hinge, Keays, Rachele, Thilthorpe
Butters, Horne-Francis, Rozee, Wines, Burgoyne | Best | Dawson, Crouch, Hinge, Berry, Worrell
Jones (achilles) | Injuries | Rankine (concussion)
Houston, Ratugolea (rough conduct), Dixon (striking), Butters, Rozee, Mead (melee) | Reports | Crouch (striking), Rachele, Nankervis (melee)

==== Round 24 ====
Round 24
Saturday, 24 August (7:40 pm) | Sydney | def. | Adelaide | SCG (crowd: 36,491) | Report
7.4 (46); 13.6 (84); 17.10 (112); 18.13 (121) | Q1; Q2; Q3; Final | 6.3 (39); 7.5 (47); 9.9 (63); 13.12 (90) | Umpires: O'Gorman, Whetton, Jones, Jankovskis; Brownlow Votes: 3 Roberts, 2 Gulden, 1 Warner; Television broadcast: Channel 7 (SA) / Fox Footy
3: Parker, McDonald; 2: Gulden, Amartey, Blakey; 1: Warner, Rowbottom, Rampe, Melican, McLean, Florent | Goals | 3: Thilthorpe, Taylor; 2: Walker; 1: Curtin, Nankervis, Keays, Dawson, Berry
Gulden, Blakey, Parker, Roberts, Mills | Best | Dawson, Soligo, Thilthorpe, Keays, Taylor
Nil | Injuries | Nil
Nil | Reports | Nil

=== Ladder ===
| Pos | Team | Pld | W | L | D | PF | PA | PP | Pts | Qualification |
|---|---|---|---|---|---|---|---|---|---|---|
| 1 | Sydney | 23 | 17 | 6 | 0 | 2242 | 1769 | 126.7 | 68 | Finals series |
| 2 | Port Adelaide | 23 | 16 | 7 | 0 | 2011 | 1752 | 114.8 | 64 | Finals series |
| 3 | Geelong | 23 | 15 | 8 | 0 | 2164 | 1928 | 112.2 | 60 | Finals series |
| 4 | Greater Western Sydney | 23 | 15 | 8 | 0 | 2034 | 1864 | 109.1 | 60 | Finals series |
| 5 | Brisbane Lions (P) | 23 | 14 | 8 | 1 | 2130 | 1747 | 121.9 | 58 | Finals series |
| 6 | Western Bulldogs | 23 | 14 | 9 | 0 | 2171 | 1736 | 125.1 | 56 | Finals series |
| 7 | Hawthorn | 23 | 14 | 9 | 0 | 2090 | 1763 | 118.5 | 56 | Finals series |
| 8 | Carlton | 23 | 13 | 10 | 0 | 2151 | 1952 | 110.2 | 52 | Finals series |
| 9 | Collingwood | 23 | 12 | 9 | 2 | 1991 | 1943 | 102.5 | 52 | |
| 10 | Fremantle | 23 | 12 | 10 | 1 | 1964 | 1755 | 111.9 | 50 | |
| 11 | Essendon | 23 | 11 | 11 | 1 | 1892 | 2024 | 93.5 | 46 | |
| 12 | St Kilda | 23 | 11 | 12 | 0 | 1748 | 1758 | 99.4 | 44 | |
| 13 | Gold Coast | 23 | 11 | 12 | 0 | 1925 | 1943 | 99.1 | 44 | |
| 14 | Melbourne | 23 | 11 | 12 | 0 | 1785 | 1812 | 98.5 | 44 | |
| 15 | Adelaide | 23 | 8 | 14 | 1 | 1906 | 1923 | 99.1 | 34 | |
| 16 | West Coast | 23 | 5 | 18 | 0 | 1594 | 2339 | 68.1 | 20 | |
| 17 | North Melbourne | 23 | 3 | 20 | 0 | 1619 | 2550 | 63.5 | 12 | |
| 18 | Richmond | 23 | 2 | 21 | 0 | 1505 | 2364 | 63.7 | 8 | |

Source: afl.com.au
Rules for classification: 1) points; 2) percentage; 3) number of points for
(P) Premiers

== Men's summary ==
=== Awards and Milestones ===
==== AFL Awards ====
- 2024 22under22 team – Josh Rachele
- Jim Stynes Community Leadership Award – Reilly O'Brien

==== AFL Award nominations ====
- AFLPA MVP Nominees – Jordan Dawson, Ben Keays, Izak Rankine
- AFLPA Best First-Year Player Nominee – Dan Curtin
- AFLPA Best Captain Nominee – Jordan Dawson
- AFLPA Most Courageous Player Nominee – Max Michalanney
- 2024 AFL Rising Star Nomination – Luke Nankervis (Round 13)
- 2024 22under22 44 man squad – Max Michalanney
- 2024 22under22 44 man squad – Jake Soligo

==== Milestones ====
Debuts

- Round 1: Chris Burgess (club debut)
- Round 8: Daniel Curtin (AFL debut)
- Round 13: Billy Dowling (AFL debut)
- Round 16: Zac Taylor (AFL debut)
- Round 18: Hugh Bond (AFL debut)

Games

- Round 2: Lachlan Murphy (100 games)
- Round 3: Brodie Smith (250 games)
- Round 5: Jordan Dawson (50 club games)
- Round 7: Mitch Hinge (50 career games)
- Round 8: Matt Crouch (150 games)
- Round 13: Jake Soligo (50 games)
- Round 17: Sam Berry (50 games)
- Round 17: Josh Rachele (50 games)
- Round 18: Nick Murray (50 games)
- Round 18: Ben Keays (100 club games)
- Round 21: Riley Thilthorpe (50 games)
- Round 20: Elliott Himmelberg (50 games)
- Round 22: Darcy Fogarty (100 games)

Goals

- Round 5: Izak Rankine (100 career goals)
- Round 9: Josh Rachele (50 goals)
- Round 19: Darcy Fogarty (150 goals)
- Round 21: Riley Thilthorpe (50 goals)

== Women's squad ==
Updated to preliminary final vs Brisbane, 2024 (24 November)

| No. | Name | AFL debut | Games (2024) | Goals (2024) | Games (AFC) | Goals (AFC) | Games (AFL career) | Goals (AFL career) |
|---|---|---|---|---|---|---|---|---|
| 1 | Caitlin Gould | 2020 | 13 | **20** | 61 | 54 | 61 | 54 |
| 2 | Eloise Jones | 2018 | 3 | 2 | 69 | 43 | 69 | 43 |
| 3 | Brooke Boileau | 2024 | 4 | 0 | 4 | 0 | 4 | 0 |
| 4 | Zoe Prowse | 2022 ^{(S6)} | **14** | 0 | 33 | 2 | 33 | 2 |
| 5 | Rachelle Martin | 2020 | 13 | 2 | 59 | 16 | 59 | 16 |
| 6 | Hannah Munyard | 2020 (Western Bulldogs) | 12 | 3 | 44 | 5 | 47 | 6 |
| 7 | Keeley Kustermann | 2022 ^{(S7)} | 12 | 1 | 14 | 2 | 14 | 2 |
| 8 | Najwa Allen | 2020 | 1 | 0 | 45 | 0 | 45 | 0 |
| 9 | Deni Varnhagen | 2017 | 5 | 0 | 38 | 6 | 38 | 6 |
| 10 | Ebony Marinoff (c) | 2017 | **14** | 4 | 93 | 15 | 93 | 15 |
| 11 | Sarah Goodwin | 2022 ^{(S7)} (Port Adelaide) | **14** | 0 | 27 | 0 | 32 | 0 |
| 12 | Chelsea Biddell | 2020 | **14** | 1 | 62 | 5 | 62 | 5 |
| 13 | Kiera Mueller | 2022 ^{(S7)} | 10 | 0 | 27 | 0 | 27 | 0 |
| 14 | Stevie-Lee Thompson | 2017 | **14** | 1 | 88 | 25 | 88 | 25 |
| 15 | Danielle Ponter | 2019 | **14** | 16 | 72 | 82 | 72 | 82 |
| 16 | Taylah Levy | 2023 | 13 | 5 | 16 | 5 | 16 | 5 |
| 17 | Madison Newman | 2020 | **14** | 2 | 53 | 9 | 53 | 9 |
| 18 | Brooke Smith | 2023 | 2 | 0 | 3 | 0 | 3 | 0 |
| 19 | Jess Waterhouse | 2022 ^{(S7)} | 3 | 0 | 15 | 5 | 15 | 5 |
| 20 | Tamara Henry | – | 0 | 0 | 0 | 0 | 0 | 0 |
| 21 | Lily Tarlington | 2024 | 2 | 0 | 2 | 0 | 2 | 0 |
| 23 | Niamh Kelly | 2020 (West Coast) | **14** | 4 | 35 | 11 | 58 | 16 |
| 24 | Amy Boyle-Carr | 2024 | 6 | 0 | 6 | 0 | 6 | 0 |
| 25 | Teah Charlton | 2021 | 11 | 3 | 59 | 11 | 59 | 11 |
| 26 | Chelsea Randall | 2017 | **14** | 10 | 74 | 32 | 74 | 32 |
| 27 | Abbie Ballard | 2022 ^{(S6)} | 4 | 1 | 28 | 8 | 28 | 8 |
| 28 | Brooke Tonon | 2022 ^{(S6)} | 13 | 2 | 30 | 2 | 30 | 2 |
| 32 | Jess Allan | 2018 | 12 | 2 | 29 | 2 | 43 | 2 |
| 33 | Anne Hatchard | 2017 | **14** | 4 | 88 | 30 | 88 | 30 |
| 39 | Sarah Allan (c) | 2017 | **14** | 0 | 83 | 0 | 83 | 0 |

Bold: 2024 games and goals leaders

=== Coaching staff ===
| Role | Name | Notes | Ref. |
|---|---|---|---|
| Head coach | Matthew Clarke | Former AFL player for Adelaide | |
| Assistant coaches | Courtney Cramey | Midfield coach Former AFLW player for Adelaide | |
| Assistant coaches | Jack Madgen | Forward coach Current SANFL player for Adelaide | |
| Assistant coaches | Marijana Rajčić | Defense coach Former AFLW player for Adelaide | |
| Assistant coaches | Kieran Strachan | Ruck coach Current AFL player for Adelaide | |
| Development coaches | Hannah Button | Former AFLW player for Adelaide | |
| Development coaches | Renee Forth | Former AFLW player for Adelaide | |
| Development coaches | Emma Sampson | | |

=== Squad changes ===
The following off-season changes were made to the squad prior to the 2024 season.

==== Out ====
| No. | Name | Position | New Club | via | Ref. |
|---|---|---|---|---|---|
| 9 | (Western Australia) McKenzie Dowrick | Forward | Woodville-West Torrens | Delisted | |
| 3 | (South Australia) Amber Ward | Medium defender | North Adelaide | Delisted | |
| 31 | (Republic of Ireland) Yvonne Bonner | Forward | —N/a | Retired | |
| 22 | (South Australia) Lisa Whiteley | Utility | —N/a | Retired | |
| 21 | (South Australia) Montana McKinnon | Ruck | Richmond | Trade | |
| 6 | (South Australia) Hannah Button | Midfielder | West Adelaide | Delisted | |

==== In ====
| No. | Name | Position | Previous club | via | Ref. |
|---|---|---|---|---|---|
| 3 | (South Australia) Brooke Boileau | Medium defender | South Adelaide | No. 22, 2023 national draft | |
| 20 | (Victoria (state)) Tamara Henry | Midfielder | Western Jets | No. 28, 2023 national draft | |
| 21 | (Queensland) Lily Tarlinton | Key forward | Bond University | No. 34, 2023 national draft | |
| 24 | (Republic of Ireland) Amy Boyle-Carr | Midfielder | Sligo Rovers | 2023 rookie signing | |

== Women's AFLW season ==
=== Pre-season matches ===
Adelaide's 2024 match simulation and pre-season fixtures
| Date and local time | Opponent | Scores | | | Venue | Ref. |
| Date and local time | Opponent | Home | Away | Result | Venue | Ref. |
|---|---|---|---|---|---|---|
| Sunday, August 11 (1:00 pm) | Port Adelaide | 5.4 (34) | 8.10 (58) | Won by 24 points | Central Oval, Port Augusta | |
| Sunday, August 18 (1:00 pm) | Carlton | 7.8 (50) | 5.8 (32) | Won by 18 points | Unley Oval | |

=== Regular season ===
Adelaide's 2024 AFL Women's season fixture
| Week | Date and local time | Opponent | Home | Away | Result | Venue | Attendance | Ladder position | Ref. |
| Week | Date and local time | Opponent | Scores | | | Venue | Attendance | Ladder position | Ref. |
|---|---|---|---|---|---|---|---|---|---|
| 1 | Saturday, 31 August (7:15 pm) | Port Adelaide | 5.5 (35) | 7.7 (49) | Won by 14 points | Alberton Oval (A) | 5,194 | 7th | |
| 2 | Sunday, 8 September (3:05 pm) | Fremantle | 0.6 (6) | 5.9 (39) | Won by 33 points | Fremantle Oval (A) | 2,669 | 3rd ▲ | |
| 3 | Sunday, 15 September (12:35 pm) | Hawthorn | 9.4 (58) | 4.8 (32) | Won by 26 points | Unley Oval (H) | 3,142 | 2nd ▲ | |
| 4 | Sunday, 22 September (12:35 pm) | Essendon | 9.8 (62) | 4.5 (29) | Won by 33 points | Unley Oval (H) | 2,311 | 1st ▲ | |
| 5 | Sunday, 29 September (3:05 pm) | Brisbane Lions | 5.5 (35) | 5.3 (32) | Lost by 2 points | Springfield Central Stadium (A) | 6,102 | 3rd ▼ | |
| 6 | Friday, 4 October (7:15 pm) | St Kilda | 3.8 (26) | 3.4 (22) | Won by 4 points | Norwood Oval (H) | 2,994 | 5th ▼ | |
| 7 | Wednesday, 9 October (7:15 pm) | Melbourne | 1.8 (14) | 2.4 (16) | Lost by 2 points | Norwood Oval (H) | 2,586 | 5th | |
| 7 | Sunday, 13 October (5:05 pm) | Greater Western Sydney | 4.4 (28) | 14.8 (92) | Won by 64 points | Henson Park (A) | 1,061 | 4th ▲ | |
| 8 | Sunday, 20 October (5:05 pm) | Collingwood | 2.1 (13) | 8.8 (56) | Won by 43 points | Victoria Park (A) | 1,775 | 3rd ▲ | |
| 9 | Friday, 25 October (7:15 pm) | North Melbourne | 4.9 (33) | 6.5 (41) | Lost by 8 points | Norwood Oval (H) | 3,275 | 4th ▼ | |
| 10 | Friday, 1 November (7:15 pm) | Geelong | 4.4 (28) | 4.8 (32) | Won by 4 points | Kardinia Park (A) | 2,233 | 4th | |

=== Ladder ===
| Pos | Team | Pld | W | L | D | PF | PA | PP | Pts | Qualification |
|---|---|---|---|---|---|---|---|---|---|---|
| 1 | North Melbourne (P) | 11 | 10 | 0 | 1 | 656 | 208 | 315.4 | 42 | Finals series |
| 2 | Hawthorn | 11 | 10 | 1 | 0 | 597 | 309 | 193.2 | 40 | Finals series |
| 3 | Brisbane | 11 | 9 | 2 | 0 | 611 | 335 | 182.4 | 36 | Finals series |
| 4 | Adelaide | 11 | 8 | 3 | 0 | 494 | 285 | 173.3 | 32 | Finals series |
| 5 | Fremantle | 11 | 8 | 3 | 0 | 404 | 297 | 136.0 | 32 | Finals series |
| 6 | Port Adelaide | 11 | 7 | 4 | 0 | 431 | 364 | 118.4 | 28 | Finals series |
| 7 | Richmond | 11 | 6 | 4 | 1 | 442 | 337 | 131.2 | 26 | Finals series |
| 8 | Essendon | 11 | 6 | 4 | 1 | 376 | 359 | 104.7 | 26 | Finals series |
| 9 | Melbourne | 11 | 6 | 5 | 0 | 369 | 420 | 87.9 | 24 | |
| 10 | Geelong | 11 | 4 | 6 | 1 | 479 | 437 | 109.6 | 18 | |
| 11 | St Kilda | 11 | 4 | 7 | 0 | 379 | 396 | 95.7 | 16 | |
| 12 | Western Bulldogs | 11 | 4 | 7 | 0 | 291 | 461 | 63.1 | 16 | |
| 13 | West Coast | 11 | 4 | 7 | 0 | 320 | 509 | 62.9 | 16 | |
| 14 | Carlton | 11 | 4 | 7 | 0 | 266 | 532 | 50.0 | 16 | |
| 15 | Sydney | 11 | 3 | 8 | 0 | 395 | 538 | 73.4 | 12 | |
| 16 | Greater Western Sydney | 11 | 1 | 9 | 1 | 374 | 531 | 70.4 | 6 | |
| 17 | Gold Coast | 11 | 1 | 9 | 1 | 311 | 569 | 54.7 | 6 | |
| 18 | Collingwood | 11 | 1 | 10 | 0 | 245 | 553 | 44.3 | 4 | |

Source: afl.com.au
Rules for classification: 1) points; 2) percentage; 3) number of points for
(P) Premiers

=== Finals ===
Adelaide's 2024 AFL Women's Finals series
| Match | Date and local time | Opponent | Home | Away | Result | Venue | Attendance | Ref. |
| Match | Date and local time | Opponent | Scores | | | Venue | Attendance | Ref. |
|---|---|---|---|---|---|---|---|---|
| QF | Friday, 8 November (7:15 pm) | North Melbourne | 5.8 (38) | 5.1 (31) | Lost by 7 points | Princes Park | 3,689 | |
| SF | Saturday, 16 November (3:05 pm) | Fremantle | 7.7 (49) | 1.6 (12) | Won by 37 points | Norwood Oval | 2,011 | |
| PF | Saturday, 23 November (6:30 pm) | Brisbane | 7.8 (50) | 4.8 (32) | Lost by 18 points | Springfield Central Stadium | 4,519 | |

Finals match summaries

==== Week 1 ====
First qualifying final
Friday, 8 November (7:15 pm) | North Melbourne 5.8 (38) | def. | Adelaide 5.1 (31) | Princes Park (crowd: 3,689) | Report
2.1 (13); 2.1 (13); 5.4 (34); 5.8 (38) | Q1; Q2; Q3; Q4 | 2.0 (12); 3.0 (18); 4.0 (24); 5.1 (31)
2: Eddey; 1: T. Randall, Shierlaw, Smith | Goals | 2: Gould, C. Randall; 1: Ponter
Riddell, Garner, Eddey, King, Smith | Best | Marinoff, C. Randall, Gould, Goodwin, J. Allan

==== Week 2 ====
First semi-final
Saturday, 16 November (3:05 pm) | Adelaide 7.7 (49) | def. | Fremantle 1.6 (12) | Norwood Oval (crowd: 2,011) | Report; Stats
1.1 (7); 5.3 (33); 7.5 (47); 7.7 (49) | Q1; Q2; Q3; Q4 | 0.3 (3); 0.4 (4); 1.5 (11); 1.6 (12)
Ballard, Levy, Marinoff, Martin, Munyard, Ponter, Randall | Goals | Seth
Marinoff, J. Allan, Newman, Prowse, Randall, Hatchard | Best | Newton, O'Sullivan, McCarthy, O'Driscoll, Strom

==== Week 3 ====
Second preliminary final
Saturday, 23 November (6:30 pm) | Brisbane 7.8 (50) | def. | Adelaide 4.8 (32) | Brighton Homes Arena (crowd: 4,519) | Report; Stats
0.3 (3); 2.4 (16); 6.5 (41); 7.8 (50) | Q1; Q2; Q3; Q4 | 1.3 (9); 3.5 (23); 3.7 (25); 4.8 (32)
Davidson 2, Dawes, Ellenger, Hampson, Hodder, C. Svarc | Goals | Randall 2, Gould, Kustermann
Grider, O'Dwyer, Anderson, C. Svarc, Hodder, Davidson, Koenen | Best | Marinoff, Randall, Biddell, Hatchard, Ponter

== Reserves squad ==
Excludes AFL-listed players. Updated as of round 17, 2024.

| No. | Name | Games (2024) | Goals (2024) | SANFL games | SANFL goals |
|---|---|---|---|---|---|
| 12 | Jay Boyle | 14 | 5 | 60 | 26 |
| 14 | Hugh Haysman | 11 | 1 | 11 | 1 |
| 42 | Tyler Welsh | 8 | 5 | 8 | 5 |
| 46 | Jack Madgen (c) | 14 | 1 | 14 | 1 |
| 47 | Jayden Davis | 3 | 1 | 3 | 1 |
| 49 | Jarman Sigal | 4 | 0 | 4 | 0 |
| 50 | Darcy Clifford | 12 | 6 | 12 | 6 |
| 51 | Jacob Templeton | 1 | 0 | 56 | 27 |
| 52 | Steve Burton | 3 | 1 | 3 | 1 |
| 53 | Josh Smithson | 5 | 9 | 12 | 20 |
| 54 | Tate Coleman | 1 | 1 | 14 | 5 |
| 55 | Stephen Tahana | 16 | 0 | 31 | 0 |
| 56 | Austin McDonald | 7 | 1 | 7 | 1 |
| 57 | Sam Daniele | 6 | 1 | 6 | 1 |
| 58 | Dylan Whimpress | 5 | 0 | 5 | 0 |
| 59 | Lachlan Thomas | 7 | 0 | 7 | 0 |
| 60 | Harry Boyle | 12 | 2 | 12 | 2 |
| 61 | Jay O'Leary | 16 | 6 | 16 | 6 |

== Reserves SANFL season ==
=== Regular season ===
SANFL fixture Crowd numbers

Adelaide's 2024 SANFL season fixture
| Round | Date and local time | Opponent | Home | Away | Result | Venue | Attendance | Ladder position | Ref. |
| Round | Date and local time | Opponent | Scores | | | Venue | Attendance | Ladder position | Ref. |
|---|---|---|---|---|---|---|---|---|---|
| 1 | Friday, 29 March (2:10 pm) | South Adelaide | 14.7 (91) | 13.18 (96) | Won by 5 points | Hickinbotham Oval (A) | 2,080 | 5th | |
| 2 | Saturday, 13 April (2:30 pm) | Central District | 15.7 (97) | 5.12 (42) | Lost by 55 points | Elizabeth Oval (A) | 1,855 | 6th ▼ | |
| 3 | Saturday, 20 April (2:10 pm) | Glenelg | 16.10 (106) | 10.8 (68) | Lost by 38 points | Glenelg Oval (A) | 2,647 | 7th ▼ | |
| 4 | Saturday, 27 April (1:10 pm) | North Adelaide | 12.12 (84) | 10.8 (68) | Lost by 16 points | Prospect Oval (A) | 2,005 | 8th ▼ | |
| 5 | Thursday, 2 May (3:20 pm) | Port Adelaide | 16.7 (103) | 8.14 (62) | Won by 41 points | Adelaide Oval (H) | – | 7th ▲ | |
| 6 | Friday, 10 May (7:40 pm) | Norwood | 10.12 (72) | 7.12 (54) | Lost by 18 points | Norwood Oval (A) | 2,602 | 8th ▼ | |
| 7 | Saturday, 25 May (2:30 pm) | Sturt | 15.12 (102) | 6.5 (41) | Lost by 61 points | Unley Oval (A) | 2,997 | 8th | |
| 8 | Saturday, 1 June (2:10 pm) | West Adelaide | 11.8 (74) | 7.12 (54) | Lost by 20 points | Richmond Oval (A) | 1,102 | 8th | |
| 9 | Saturday, 8 June (1:10 pm) | South Adelaide | 8.14 (62) | 8.7 (55) | Lost by 7 points | Hickinbotham Oval (A) | 1,844 | 9th ▼ | |
| 10 | Saturday, 15 June (3:10 pm) | Woodville-West Torrens | 7.7 (49) | 15.12 (102) | Lost by 53 points | Adelaide Oval (H) | – | 9th | |
| 11 | Bye | | | | | | | 9th | Bye |
| 12 | Saturday, 29 June | Glenelg | 7.15 (57) | 15.6 (96) | Won by 39 points | Glenelg Oval (A) | 1,477 | 8th ▲ | |
| 13 | Saturday, 6 July | Central District | 5.9 (39) | 11.9 (75) | Won by 36 points | Elizabeth Oval (A) | 1,519 | 7th ▲ | |
| 14 | Saturday, 13 July | Norwood | 14.18 (102) | 5.9 (39) | Lost by 63 points | Norwood Oval (A) | 1,661 | 8th ▼ | |
| 15 | Saturday, 20 July | North Adelaide | 7.13 (55) | 14.9 (93) | Won by 38 points | Prospect Oval (A) | 1,291 | 8th | |
| 16 | Saturday, 27 July | Woodville-West Torrens | 8.12 (60) | 11.10 (76) | Won by 16 points | Woodville Oval (A) | – | 7th ▲ | |
| 17 | Sunday, 11 August (2:10 pm) | West Adelaide | 17.9 (111) | 6.7 (43) | Won by 68 points | Adelaide Oval (H) | – | 7th | |
| 18 | Saturday, 17 August | Port Adelaide | 6.11 (47) | 19.10 (124) | Won by 77 points | Adelaide Oval (A) | – | 6th ▲ | |
| 17 | Sunday, 24 August | Sturt | 7.18 (60) | 5.16 (46) | Lost by 14 points | Unley Oval (A) | 4,147 | 6th | |
