= Zac Taylor (Australian footballer) =

Australian rules footballer (born 2003)

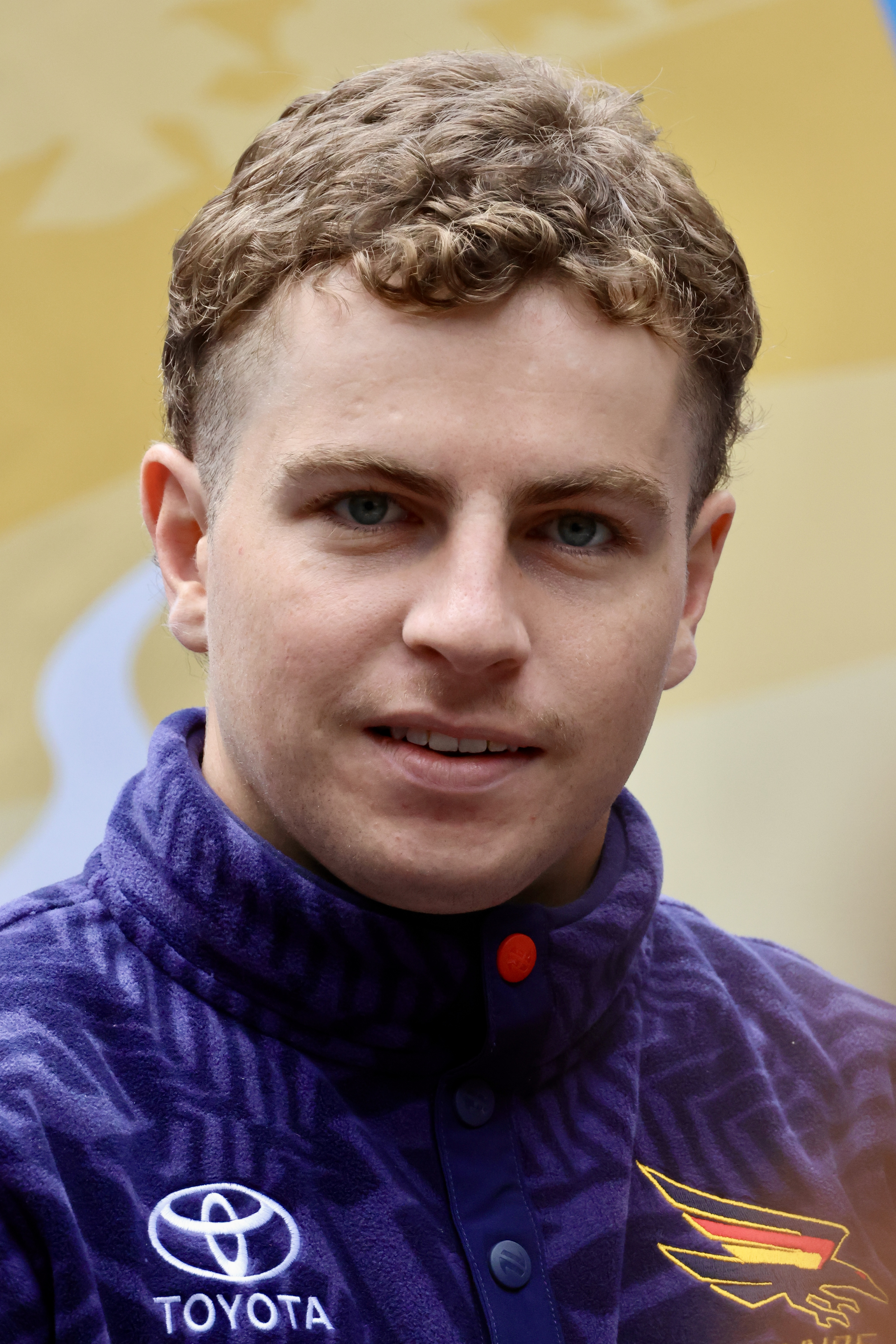
- Taylor at the 2026 Gather Round

Personal information
- Nickname: Milk
- Born: 31 January 2003 (age 23); Victoria, Australia
- Original teams: Calder Cannons (Talent League); Oak Park (Vic); Penola Catholic College (Vic)
- Draft: No. 44, 2021 national draft
- Debut: Round 16, 2024, Adelaide vs. Greater Western Sydney, at Adelaide Oval
- Height: 180 cm (5 ft 11 in)
- Position: Midfielder

Club information
- Current club: Adelaide
- Number: 19

Playing career^{1}
Years	Club	Games (Goals)
2022–	Adelaide	45 (19)
- ^{1} Playing statistics correct to the end of round 22, 2026.

Zac Taylor (born 31 January 2003) is an Australian rules footballer who plays for the Adelaide Football Club in the Australian Football League (AFL). Taylor was selected with the 44th pick in the 2021 national draft.

== Early life ==
Taylor played for Oak Park Football Club in Melbourne as a junior player, and was invited to play for the Calder Cannons in the Talent League. Taylor represented Vic Metro in the as an under-18 player, and briefly played matches for Essendon's VFL side. In 2021, Taylor won the best-and-fairest award at Calder as a contested midfielder.

Taylor was drafted at pick 44, in the third round of the 2021 national draft to Adelaide. To his surprise, he was drafted alongside Jake Soligo, with whom he had struck a friendship during their time playing for Vic Metro.

== AFL career ==
Taylor had a prolific period of form playing for Adelaide's reserve team in the SANFL, interrupted in his second year by a long-term foot injury. Early in the 2024 season, Taylor appeared to seriously injury his knee, but the injury was not as severe as initially expected.

Following a late injury to backman Chayce Jones, it was announced that Taylor would make his long-awaited debut in round 16 of 2024. As the tactical substitute, he replaced Brayden Cook and amassed four disposals in the final quarter of the win against Greater Western Sydney at Adelaide Oval. It was the first time that all of Adelaide's 2021-drafted players had played together – Taylor, Soligo, Josh Rachele, and pre-season draftee Luke Nankervis. Taylor was the sub again the following week, but made his first full appearance in round 18 against St Kilda. Taylor was named one of Adelaide's best on that night, with 8 tackles, 8 clearances, and 12 contested possessions.

In Taylor's second full game, and fourth overall, he kicked his first career goal from a set shot. The goal assisted Adelaide's stunning two-point win against Essendon.

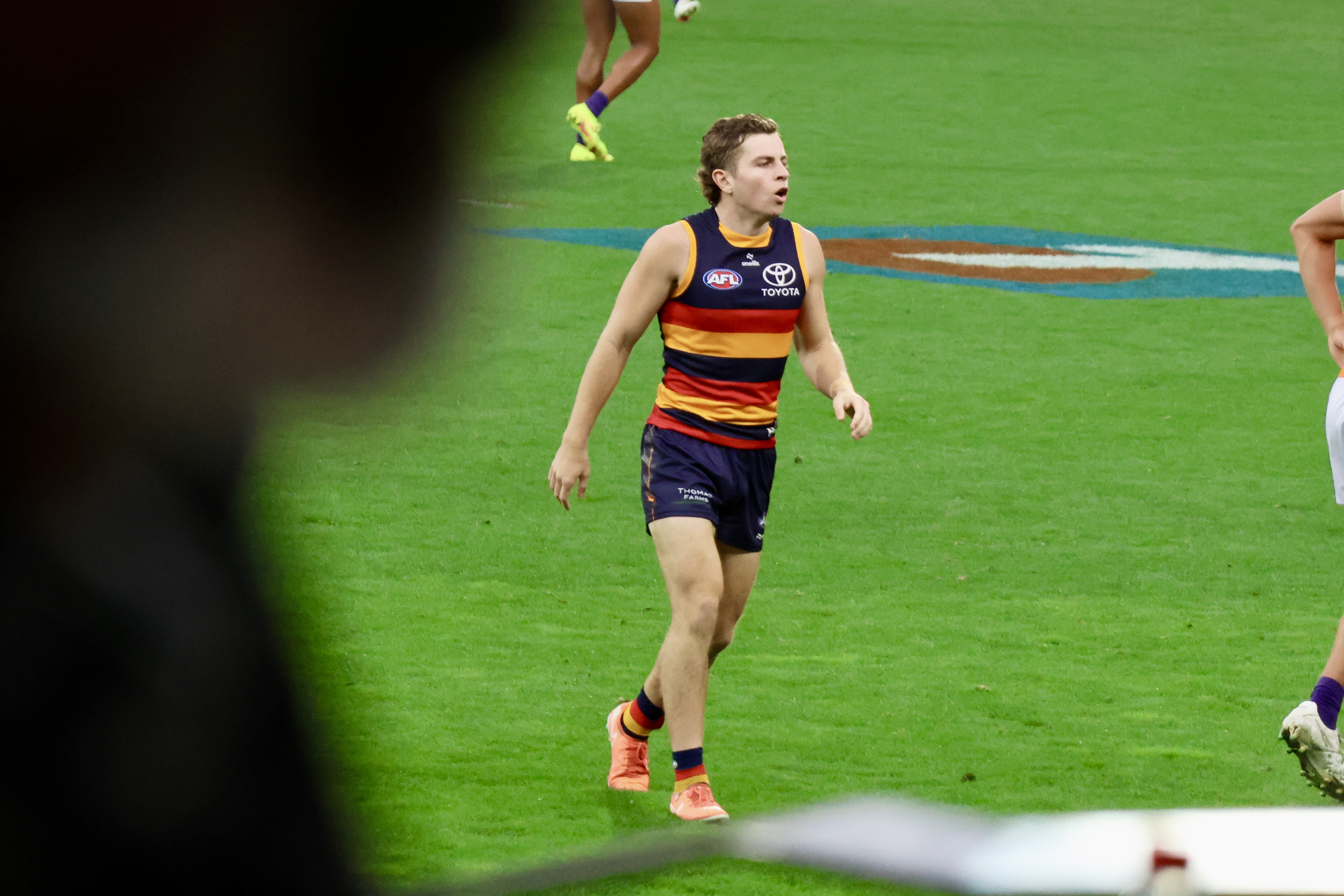
Taylor in a round 6 match against Greater Western Sydney in 2025

Taylor improved on his debut year when he made 17 senior appearance in 2025. He collected a career-best 20 disposals in round 22 against West Coast as the Crows finished first on the ladder. Following the conclusion of Adelaide's season, Taylor was rewarded with another one-year contract extension.

During the 2026 season, Taylor played in 21 of Adelaide's 23 regular season games, excelling in a half-forward flank role epitomised with a career-best performance against the Western Bulldogs in round 14. In round 24 against Greater Western Sydney, he strained his hamstring, placing his finals hopes in jeopardy. After missing the elimination final against the Western Bulldogs, the Crows rewarded Taylor by selecting him for the semi-final over veteran Isaac Cumming.

== Personal life ==
Taylor has two brothers, Bailey and Jedd, the former of which he would have played junior football with if not for a collarbone injury in the pair's first game together at Oak Park.

Taylor currently lives in Adelaide with Daniel Curtin and Hugh Bond, who both also made their debuts in 2024.

He grew up supporting North Melbourne in the AFL and also supports the Atlanta Hawks in the NBA.

== Statistics ==
Updated to the end of round 22, 2026.

Legend
G	Goals	K	Kicks	D	Disposals	T	Tackles
B	Behinds	H	Handballs	M	Marks

Season	Team	No.	Games	Totals							Averages (per game)							Votes
Season	Team	No.	Games	G	B	K	H	D	M	T	G	B	K	H	D	M	T	Votes
2022	Adelaide	19	0	—	—	—	—	—	—	—	—	—	—	—	—	—	—	0
2023	Adelaide	19	0	—	—	—	—	—	—	—	—	—	—	—	—	—	—	0
2024	Adelaide	19	9	4	4	44	45	89	13	28	0.4	0.4	4.9	5.0	9.9	1.4	3.1	0
2025	Adelaide	19	17	4	5	76	88	164	39	45	0.2	0.3	4.5	5.2	9.6	2.3	2.6	0
2026	Adelaide	19	19	11	5	119	114	233	57	53	0.6	0.3	6.3	6.0	12.3	3.0	2.8	0
Career			45	19	14	239	247	486	109	126	0.4	0.3	5.3	5.5	10.8	2.4	2.8	0
