= Hugh Bond =

Hugh Bond may refer to:

- Hugh Lennox Bond, United States circuit judge
- Hugh Bond (footballer), Australian rules footballer
