= Lachlan Murphy =

Australian rules footballer

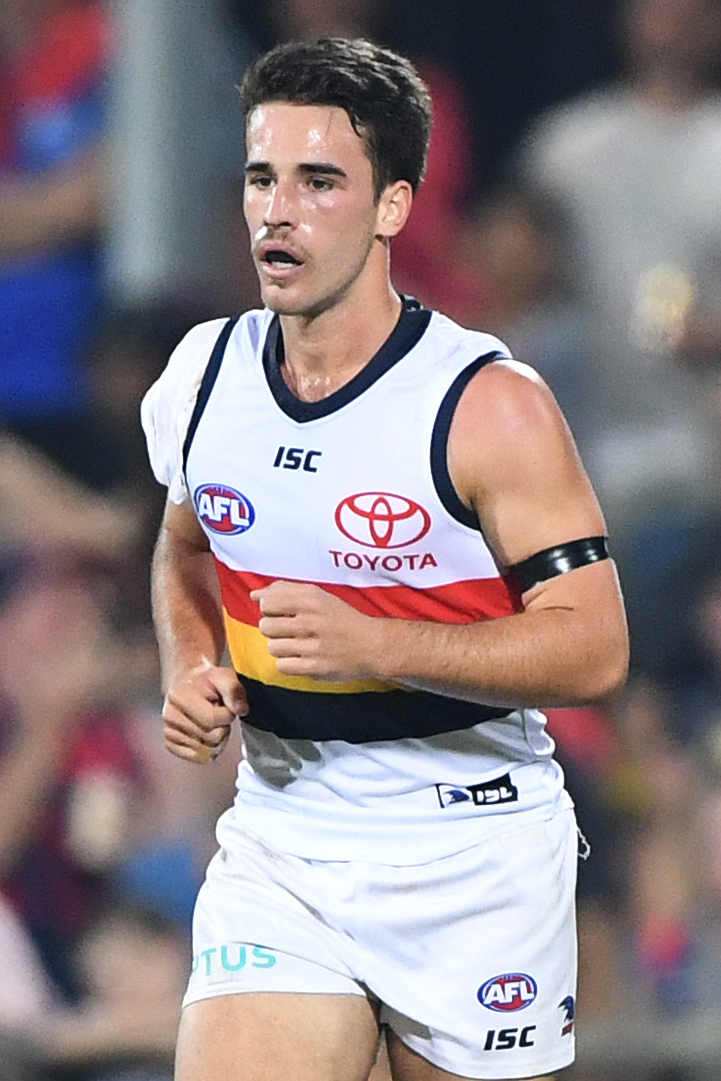
- Murphy in June 2019

Personal information
- Born: 4 December 1998 (age 27)
- Original teams: Adelaide (SANFL); Northern Knights (TAC Cup)
- Draft: No. 38, 2018 rookie draft
- Debut: Round 1, 2018, Adelaide vs. Essendon, at Etihad Stadium
- Height: 176 cm (5 ft 9 in)
- Weight: 83 kg (183 lb)
- Position: Half forward

Playing career
Years	Club	Games (Goals)
2018–2025	Adelaide	120 (75)

Lachlan Murphy (born 4 December 1998) is a former professional Australian rules footballer who last played for Adelaide in the Australian Football League (AFL). He was drafted by Adelaide with their third selection and thirty-eighth overall in the 2018 rookie draft. He made his debut in the twelve point loss to Essendon at Etihad Stadium in the opening round of the 2018 season.

== Early life ==
Murphy grew up in the Melbourne suburb of Diamond Creek. He started at Auskick level with Diamond Creek Junior Football Club and attended primary school at Sacred Heart in Diamond Creek, Victoria. He went to high school at Ivanhoe Grammar School. He grew up as a Collingwood supporter.

Murphy was the inaugural winner of the Brent Harvey Medal, awarded to the best and fairest player for the Northern Knights TAC Cup team in 2016.

Adelaide's reserves team signed Murphy in 2017 so that he could train with the AFL squad, and for the duration of the year played for the Crows in the South Australian National Football League (SANFL). He was drafted as a rookie the following year.

== AFL career ==
After debuting with Adelaide in 2018, Murphy became a regular in Adelaide's squad, eventually playing all but one game in Adelaide's 2023 season when the Crows were pushing for finals.

For his on-field perseverance, he was rewarded with an elevation into the senior side's leadership group prior to the 2024 season. He became the 60th Crow to play 100 games in round 2 of the same year.

== Personal life ==
While playing with Adelaide's reserves team in the SANFL, Murphy worked at Football Park's Crowmania store, the club's merchandise retailer.

In August 2024, Murphy announced his engagement to his partner Madison. The couple announced that they are expecting their first child in June 2025.

== Statistics ==
Legend
G	Goals	K	Kicks	D	Disposals	T	Tackles
B	Behinds	H	Handballs	M	Marks

Season	Team	No.	Games	Totals							Averages (per game)							Votes
Season	Team	No.	Games	G	B	K	H	D	M	T	G	B	K	H	D	M	T	Votes
2018	Adelaide	44	11	12	8	60	36	96	20	41	1.1	0.7	5.5	3.3	8.7	1.8	3.7	0
2019	Adelaide	44	21	19	15	133	92	225	58	68	0.9	0.7	6.3	4.4	10.7	2.8	3.2	0
2020 (Note: The 2020 season was played with 17 home-and-away matches per team (down from 22) and 16-minute quarters with time on (down from 20-minute quarters with time on) due to the impact of the COVID-19 pandemic.)	Adelaide	4	12	7	8	57	54	111	17	38	0.6	0.7	4.8	4.5	9.3	1.4	3.2	0
2021	Adelaide	4	15	9	15	100	76	176	25	34	0.6	1.0	6.7	5.1	11.7	1.7	2.3	0
2022	Adelaide	4	17	9	12	129	83	212	38	49	0.5	0.7	7.6	4.9	12.5	2.2	2.9	0
2023	Adelaide	4	22	12	8	190	139	329	67	67	0.5	0.4	8.6	6.3	15.0	3.0	3.0	0
2024	Adelaide	4	17	7	6	98	98	196	47	57	0.4	0.4	5.8	5.8	11.5	2.8	3.4	0
2025	Adelaide	4	5	0	2	18	22	40	6	12	0.0	0.4	3.6	4.4	8.0	1.2	2.4	0
Career			120	75	74	785	600	1385	278	366	0.6	0.6	6.5	5.0	11.5	2.3	3.1	0
