= Lachlan Sholl =

Australian rules footballer (born 2000)

Personal information
- Born: 7 March 2000 (age 26)
- Draft: No. 64, 2018 national draft
- Debut: 5 August 2020, Adelaide vs. Melbourne, at Adelaide Oval
- Height: 186 cm (6 ft 1 in)
- Weight: 80 kg (176 lb)
- Position: Midfielder

Club information
- Current club: Adelaide
- Number: 38

Playing career^{1}
Years	Club	Games (Goals)
2019–2026	Adelaide	79 (26)
- ^{1} Playing statistics correct to the end of the 2025 season.

Career highlights
- 2× AFL Rising Star nominee: 2020, 2021

Lachlan Sholl (born 7 March 2000) is an Australian rules footballer who last played for the Adelaide Crows in the Australian Football League (AFL). He was recruited by the Adelaide Crows with the 64th draft pick in the 2018 AFL draft. Sholl is the son of former Carlton player Brett Sholl, and nephew of former North Melbourne player Craig Sholl and former Geelong player Brad Sholl.

== Early football ==
Sholl is from Victoria and played junior football for the St Bernard's Football Club in Melbourne. He also played for the Calder Cannons in the NAB League. During his two seasons with the Cannons, Sholl played 28 games and kicked 9 goals. Sholl represented Vic Metro in the AFL Under 18 Championships in 2018, playing three games and recording a disposal average of 16.7 and disposal efficiency of 70%.

== AFL career ==
Sholl debuted in the Crows' 51-point loss to the Melbourne Football Club in the 10th round of the 2020 AFL season. On debut, Sholl recorded 10 disposals, one mark, one tackle and two clearances. After two impressive performances in Rounds 17 and 18 of the 2020 AFL season, where he collected a combined total of two goals, 43 disposals, nine marks and four clearances, he earned a Rising Star nomination in the final round of the season, after narrowly missing out the week before to Collingwood's Isaac Quaynor. Sholl earned praise from past footballers such as David King, who stated "I think this kid could be the best kick in the comp in the next 18 months, you watch him and he’s deadly by foot. Over the last six or seven games that we’ve seen him play – and it’s only very early – but his skills stand out already for the Adelaide Crows. I don’t see too many youngsters come in and inject themselves into the game like he has."

Sholl became just the 12th player in AFL history to receive two Rising Star nominations when he received a 2021 AFL Rising Star nomination for his inspired performance against North Melbourne, where he collected 31 disposals and a goal. He also became the fastest player two achieve this feat.

With his contract ending at the end of 2024, Sholl strung together some impressive form. Fresh off of receiving 6 of a possible 10 coaches votes against St Kilda in July 2024, he was awarded with a two-year contract extension, keeping him at Adelaide until at least the end of 2026.

== Statistics ==
Updated to the end of the 2026 season.

Legend
G	Goals	K	Kicks	D	Disposals	T	Tackles
B	Behinds	H	Handballs	M	Marks

Season	Team	No.	Games	Totals							Averages (per game)							Votes
Season	Team	No.	Games	G	B	K	H	D	M	T	G	B	K	H	D	M	T	Votes
2020 (Note: The 2020 season was played with 17 home-and-away matches per team (down from 22) and 16-minute quarters with time on (down from 20-minute quarters with time on) due to the impact of the COVID-19 pandemic.)	Adelaide	38	8	2	1	72	33	105	25	7	0.3	0.1	9.0	4.1	13.1	3.1	0.9	3
2021	Adelaide	38	19	3	7	208	126	334	78	21	0.2	0.4	10.9	6.6	17.6	4.1	1.1	2
2022	Adelaide	38	11	4	1	103	74	177	38	9	0.4	0.1	9.4	6.7	16.1	3.5	0.8	0
2023	Adelaide	38	16	4	5	175	100	275	78	31	0.3	0.3	10.9	6.3	17.2	4.9	1.9	0
2024	Adelaide	38	20	12	6	293	139	432	105	45	0.6	0.3	14.7	7.0	21.6	5.3	2.3	0
2025	Adelaide	38	5	1	0	42	28	70	22	4	0.2	0.0	8.4	5.6	14.0	4.4	0.8	0
2026	Adelaide	38	0	–	–	–	–	–	–	–	–	–	–	–	–	–	–	0
Career			79	26	20	893	500	1393	346	117	0.3	0.3	11.3	6.3	17.6	4.4	1.5	5
