= Ned McHenry =

Australian football league player

Personal information
- Full name: Edward McHenry
- Nickname: The Alpaca
- Born: 13 July 2000 (age 26); Melbourne, Victoria
- Original team: Geelong Falcons (NAB League)
- Draft: No. 16, 2018 AFL draft, Adelaide
- Debut: 13 June 2020, Adelaide vs. Port Adelaide, at Adelaide Oval
- Height: 179 cm (5 ft 10 in)
- Weight: 73 kg (161 lb)
- Position: Forward

Playing career
Years	Club	Games (Goals)
2019–2024	Adelaide	70 (32)

Ned McHenry is a former Australian rules footballer who played for the Adelaide Crows in the Australian Football League (AFL). He was recruited by the Adelaide Crows with the 16th draft pick in the 2018 AFL draft.

== Early football ==
McHenry played for the Geelong Falcons, and later for Vic Country in the AFL Under-18 Championships.

== AFL career ==
McHenry played 10 games in the SANFL in 2019, where he averaged 18.4 disposals. He had his best game for the year against Norwood in the semi-final, where he kicked 4 goals, had 17 disposals, took 4 marks and laid 5 tackles. Despite this, he was unable to break into the main side until 2020. McHenry debuted in the 2nd round of the 2020 AFL season, against the Port Adelaide Power. In his first game, he picked up 12 disposals and kicked two behinds.

McHenry showed promising signs of improvement in a pre-season match in February 2024, but following only 10 games in the 2024 season, McHenry was delisted by the club. Wearing number 25, McHenry played 70 games and kicked 32 goals for the club across his five years of playing at AFL level.

== Post-AFL career ==
Following his delisting from the Adelaide Crows in 2024, McHenry became a playing coach for Prince Alfred Old Collegians Football Club. Joining McHenry on the coaching panel of the local football club would be former Crows teammate Taylor Walker.

== Statistics ==
Legend
G	Goals	K	Kicks	D	Disposals	T	Tackles
B	Behinds	H	Handballs	M	Marks

Season	Team	No.	Games	Totals							Averages (per game)							Votes
Season	Team	No.	Games	G	B	K	H	D	M	T	G	B	K	H	D	M	T	Votes
2019	Adelaide	25	0	—	—	—	—	—	—	—	—	—	—	—	—	—	—	0
2020 (Note: The 2020 season was played with 17 home-and-away matches per team (down from 22) and 16-minute quarters with time on (down from 20-minute quarters with time on) due to the impact of the COVID-19 pandemic.)	Adelaide	25	8	0	4	31	42	73	17	23	0.0	0.5	3.9	5.3	9.1	2.1	2.9	0
2021	Adelaide	25	21	11	7	120	138	258	54	66	0.5	0.3	5.7	6.6	12.3	2.6	3.1	0
2022	Adelaide	25	20	13	6	116	132	248	47	66	0.7	0.3	5.8	6.6	12.4	2.4	3.3	0
2023	Adelaide	25	11	4	0	75	56	131	39	13	0.4	0.0	6.8	5.1	11.9	3.5	1.2	0
2024	Adelaide	25	10	4	2	59	39	98	33	20	0.4	0.2	5.9	3.9	9.8	3.3	2.0	0
2025	Adelaide	25	0	—	—	—	—	—	—	—	—	—	—	—	—	—	—	0
Career			70	32	19	401	407	808	190	188	0.5	0.3	5.7	5.8	11.5	2.7	2.7	0
