= Leigh Haussen =

Australian rules football umpire

Personal information
- Full name: Leigh Haussen
- Nickname
- Height: 180 cm (5 ft 11 in)
- Other occupation: Finance

Umpiring career
Years	League	Role	Games
2012–2014 2016–	AFL	Field umpire	12

Leigh Haussen is an Australian rules football umpire currently officiating in the Australian Football League.

He made his senior South Australian National Football League umpiring debut in 2010 and went on to umpire over 160 SANFL games, including the 2010, 2011, 2012, 2013, 2015, and 2016 grand finals. He was on the AFL umpiring rookie list from at least 2012 to 2014, officiating his first game, substituted on as an emergency umpire for Scott Jeffery, in 2014. He was not AFL-listed in 2015, before returning to the rookie list in 2016. In 2017, he was added to the senior umpiring list following Jordan Bannister's retirement, and made his debut as a non-emergency umpire that year, umpiring 11 matches that season.

In November 2024, he was banned for the rest of the season, after it turned up he dressed as the terrorist Osama bin Laden at the umpires' end of season function, an event that took place at a private room in a Melbourne restaurant.
