= Jye Caldwell =

Australian rules footballer

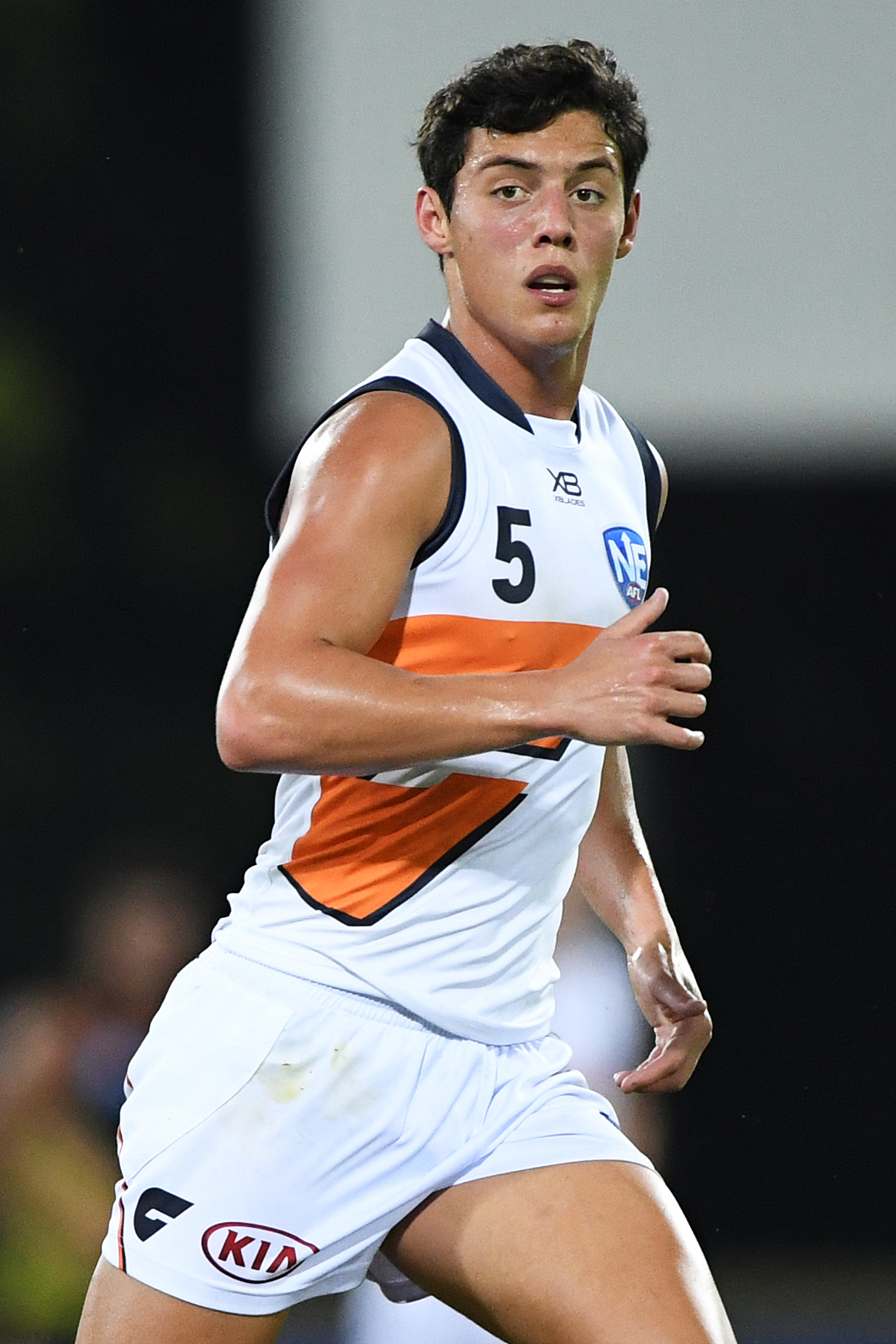
- Caldwell playing for Greater Western Sydney in 2019

Personal information
- Full name: Jye Caldwell
- Born: 28 September 2000 (age 26)
- Original team: Bendigo Pioneers (TAC Cup)/Geelong Grammar School (APS)
- Draft: No. 11, 2018 national draft
- Debut: Round 21, 2019, Greater Western Sydney vs. Hawthorn, at Manuka Oval
- Height: 183 cm (6 ft 0 in)
- Weight: 83 kg (183 lb)
- Position: Midfielder

Club information
- Current club: Essendon
- Number: 6

Playing career^{1}
Years	Club	Games (Goals)
2019–2020	Greater Western Sydney	11 (1)
2021–	Essendon	93 (36)
Total		103 (37)
- ^{1} Playing statistics correct to the end of round 22, 2026.

Jye Caldwell (born 28 September 2000) is a professional Australian rules footballer playing for the Essendon Football Club in the Australian Football League (AFL). He was recruited by the Greater Western Sydney Giants with pick 11 in the 2018 national draft.

== Early life ==
Caldwell participated in the Auskick program at Golden Square and played his junior football with Golden Square before progressing to the Bendigo Pioneers in the TAC Cup. He represented Victoria Country at the 2018 AFL Under 18 Championships. Apart from football Caldwell was also a talented junior boxer.

== AFL career ==
=== Greater Western Sydney ===
Caldwell was recruited by the Greater Western Sydney Giants with pick 11 in the 2018 national draft.

He made his senior debut in the 56-point loss against Hawthorn, in round 21 of the 2019 AFL season at Manuka Oval.

=== Essendon ===
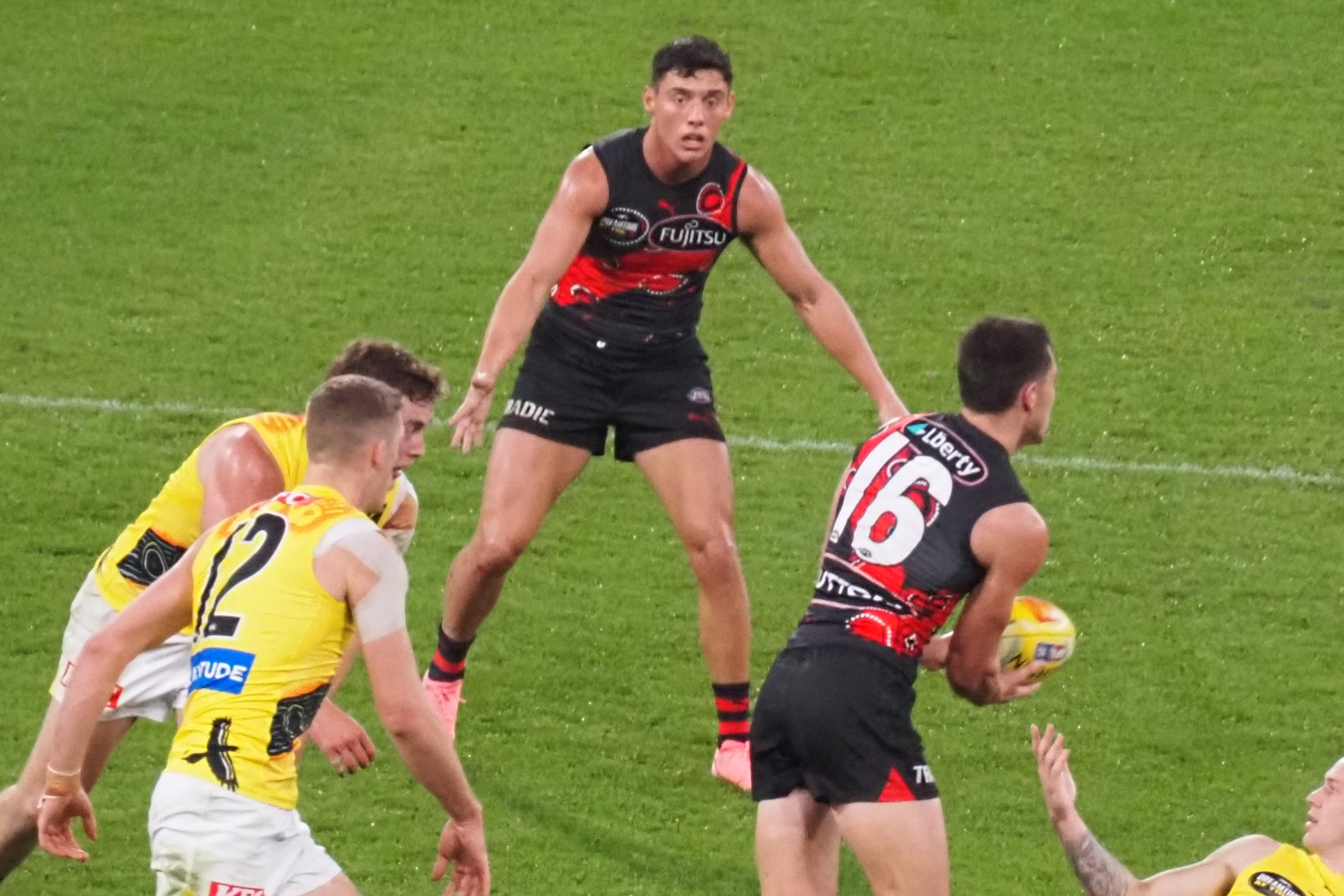
Caldwell (centre) playing for Essendon in 2025

At the conclusion of the 2020 AFL season, Caldwell requested a trade to Essendon. He was traded on November 12, the final day of trade period.

Caldwell made his debut for Essendon in their round 1 match against Hawthorn, however suffered a hamstring injury in round 2 and was ruled out for the rest of the home and away season. Caldwell returned for Essendon's elimination final defeat against the Western Bulldogs at York Park in Launceston.

In 2024, Caldwell had a "breakout season", getting more midfield time and thus becoming one of Essendon's best players and most important midfielders, including winning Essendon's player of the month award in June of that season. Caldwell played every game for the season and finished the season ranked 7th in the league for tackles, while also finishing ranked 1st for clearances at the Bombers. Caldwell capped off his fantastic season by re-signing with Essendon for a further four seasons.

== Statistics ==
Updated to the end of round 22, 2026.

Legend
G	Goals	K	Kicks	D	Disposals	T	Tackles
B	Behinds	H	Handballs	M	Marks

Season	Team	No.	Games	Totals							Averages (per game)							Votes
Season	Team	No.	Games	G	B	K	H	D	M	T	G	B	K	H	D	M	T	Votes
2019	Greater Western Sydney	5	2	0	0	13	10	23	7	9	0.0	0.0	6.5	5.0	11.5	3.5	4.5	0
2020 (Note: The 2020 season was played with 17 home-and-away matches per team (down from 22) and 16-minute quarters with time on (down from 20-minute quarters with time on) due to the impact of the COVID-19 pandemic.)	Greater Western Sydney	5	9	1	2	56	58	114	27	33	0.1	0.2	6.2	6.4	12.7	3.0	3.7	0
2021	Essendon	6	3	0	1	27	19	46	8	16	0.0	0.3	9.0	6.3	15.3	2.7	5.3	0
2022	Essendon	6	20	6	8	175	200	375	67	86	0.3	0.4	8.8	10.0	18.8	3.4	4.3	0
2023	Essendon	6	21	11	12	183	208	391	71	89	0.5	0.6	8.7	9.9	18.6	3.4	4.2	2
2024	Essendon	6	23	8	9	253	270	523	95	149	0.3	0.4	11.0	11.7	22.7	4.1	6.5	8
2025	Essendon	6	11	5	3	137	148	285	44	74	0.5	0.3	12.5	13.5	25.9	4.0	6.7	2
2026	Essendon	6	15	6	7	125	130	255	41	77	0.4	0.5	8.3	8.7	17.0	2.7	5.1	0
Career			104	37	42	969	1043	2012	360	533	0.4	0.4	9.3	10.0	19.3	3.5	5.1	12
