= Curtis Deboy =

Australian rules football umpire

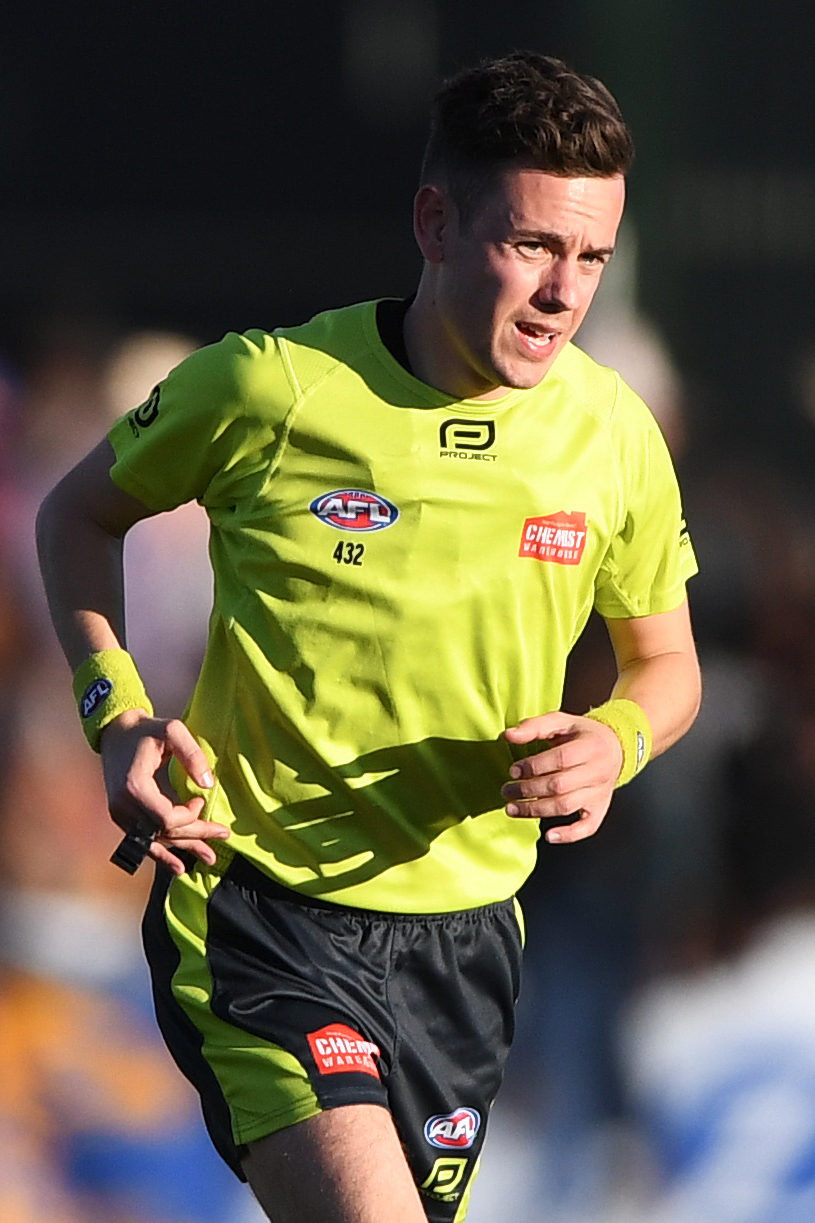
- Deboy in July 2019

Personal information
- Full name: Curtis Deboy
- Born: 28 March 1990 (age 36)
- Height: 174 cm (5 ft 9 in)
- Weight: 64 kg (141 lb)
- Other occupation: Sports operations/marketing

Umpiring career
Years	League	Role	Games
2014–Present	Australian Football League	Field Umpire	108 (4 finals appearances)

Career highlights
- SANFL Golden Whistle: 2013, 2014; SANFL Grand Final Umpire: 2012, 2013, 2014

Curtis Deboy is an Australian rules football umpire currently officiating in the Australian Football League. He is also the host of the Outback QB podcast where he discusses the NFL with co-hosts, Chris Hall and Matt Maidment.

He first umpired in the Central District Junior Football League in 2004. He made his umpiring debut in the South Australian National Football League in 2009 at the age of 19 and went on to umpire 119 SANFL games, including the 2012, 2013 and 2014 Grand Finals. He was on the AFL umpiring rookie list for 2013 and 2014, officiating his first game, substituted on as an emergency umpire, in 2014. In 2015, he was added to the senior umpiring list, and made his debut as a non-emergency umpire in Round 4 of that year, in a match between the Western Bulldogs and Adelaide at Docklands Stadium.

== Personal life ==
Deboy was born in Adelaide, South Australia and attended Eynesbury Senior College. He is married and resides in Melbourne, Australia.
