= Sam Durham =

Australian football league player

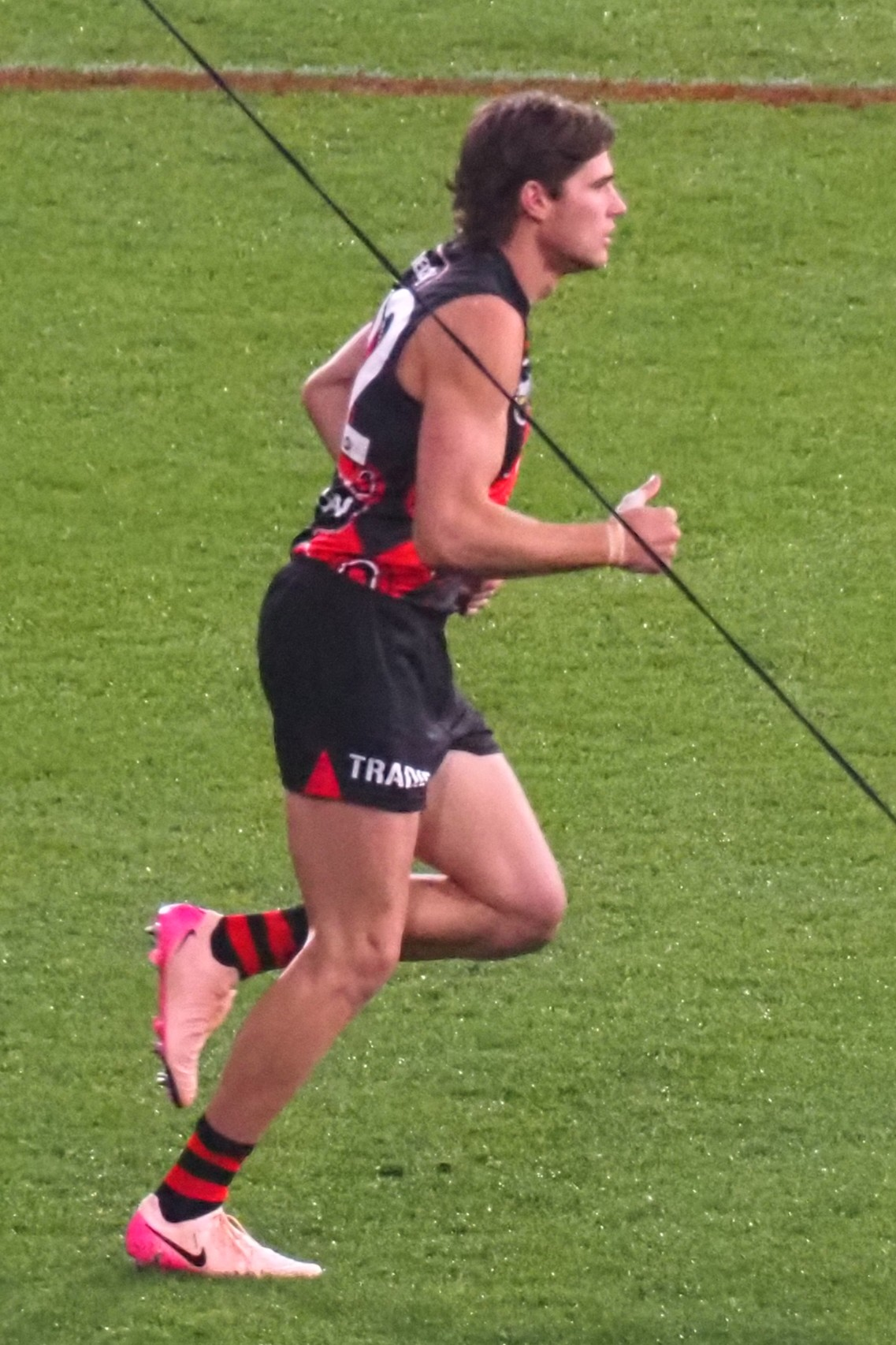
- Durham pre-match with Essendon in 2025

Personal information
- Full name: Sam Durham
- Nickname: Duz
- Born: 9 July 2001 (age 25)
- Original teams: Seymour, Murray Bushrangers, Richmond (VFL)
- Draft: No. 9, 2021 Mid season draft
- Height: 185 cm (6 ft 1 in)
- Weight: 84 kg (185 lb)
- Position: Midfielder

Club information
- Current club: Essendon
- Number: 22

Playing career^{1}
Years	Club	Games (Goals)
2021–	Essendon	111 (38)
- ^{1} Playing statistics correct to the end of round 22, 2026.

Sam Durham (born 09 July 2001) is an Australian rules footballer who plays for Essendon in the Australian Football League (AFL).

== AFL career ==
Durham was recruited by Essendon with the 9th draft pick in the 2021 mid-season draft. He made his debut in round 18 of the 2021 season against North Melbourne. He collected 11 disposals in an 18-point victory.

Durham was upgraded to Essendon's senior list for the 2023 season after a season and a half on the rookie list. Durham kicked the winning goal for Essendon with 7 seconds left, in the annual Dreamtime at the 'G match against Richmond. Durham also won Essendon's Player of the Month award in August of that season, to cap off a strong season.

Durham again rose to new heights in the 2024 season, having his true breakout season as he was deployed as a full time midfielder and established himself as one of Essendon's best and most important players. During the season, Durham also signed a 4-year contract extension with the Bombers, through to the end of 2028.

== Statistics ==
Updated to the end of round 22, 2026.

Legend
G	Goals	K	Kicks	D	Disposals	T	Tackles
B	Behinds	H	Handballs	M	Marks

Season	Team	No.	Games	Totals							Averages (per game)							Votes
Season	Team	No.	Games	G	B	K	H	D	M	T	G	B	K	H	D	M	T	Votes
2021	Essendon	42	7	1	2	47	52	99	31	9	0.1	0.3	6.7	7.4	14.1	4.4	1.3	0
2022	Essendon	22	20	5	6	140	161	301	91	35	0.3	0.3	7.0	8.1	15.1	4.6	1.8	0
2023	Essendon	22	22	5	2	178	185	363	107	47	0.2	0.1	8.1	8.4	16.5	4.9	2.1	0
2024	Essendon	22	22	10	5	235	235	470	88	97	0.5	0.2	10.7	10.7	21.4	4.0	4.4	6
2025	Essendon	22	20	8	7	201	236	437	59	82	0.4	0.4	10.1	11.8	21.9	3.0	4.1	4
2026	Essendon	22	20	9	6	189	213	402	72	79	0.5	0.3	9.5	10.7	20.1	3.6	4.0	0
Career			111	38	28	990	1082	2072	448	349	0.3	0.3	8.9	9.7	18.7	4.0	3.1	10
