= Robert O'Gorman =

Australian rules football umpire

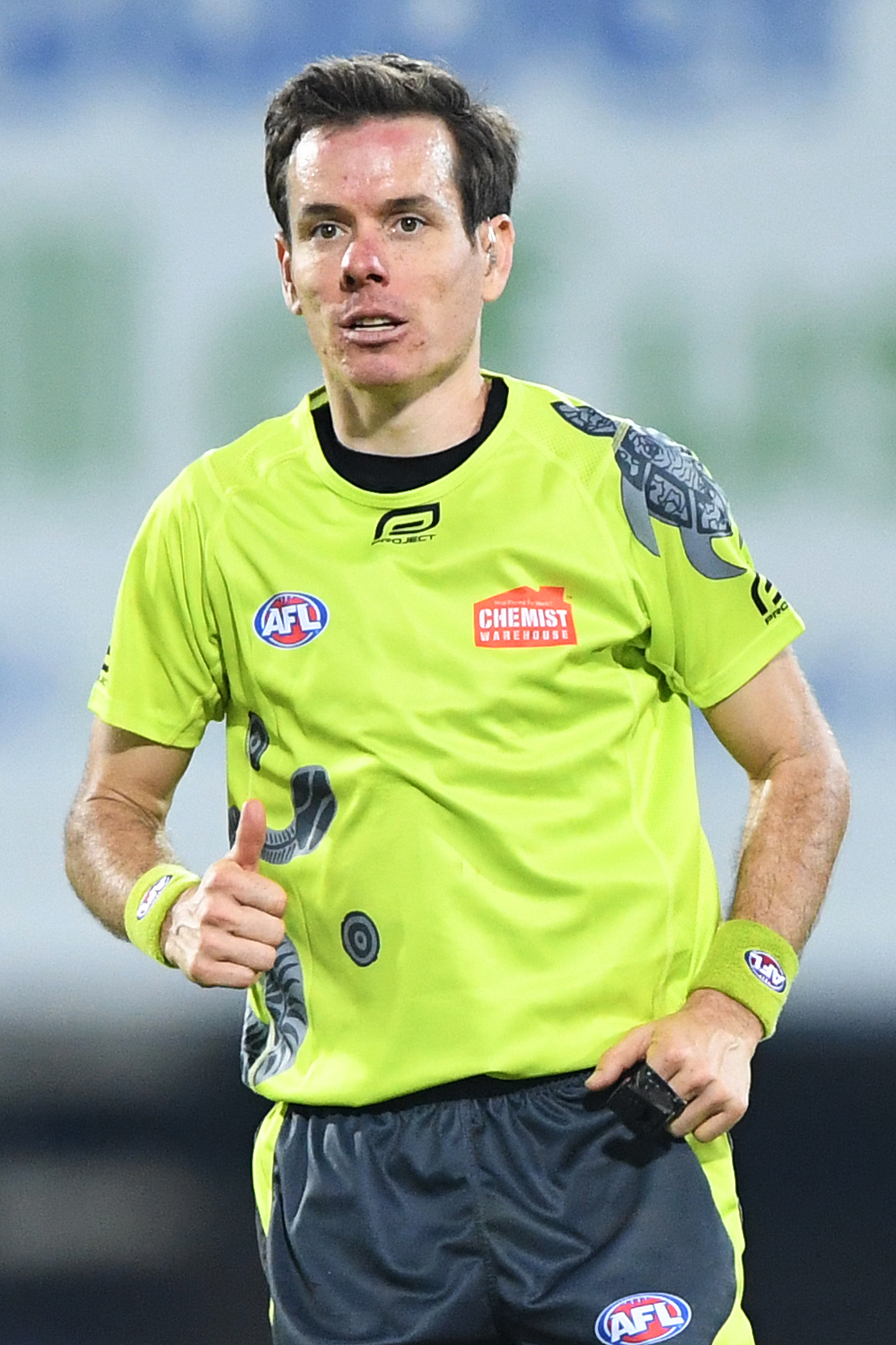
- O'Gorman in June 2019

Personal information
- Full name: Robert O'Gorman
- Other occupation: Manager Productions

Umpiring career
Years	League	Role	Games
2014–	AFL	Field umpire	204

Career highlights
- VFL Development League Grand Final: 2011; VFL Grand Final umpire: 2013

Robert O'Gorman is an Australian rules football umpire currently officiating in the Australian Football League.

He first umpired in the Moorabbin Saints Junior Football League in 2006. He has since umpired in a number of leagues, including the TAC Cup, the VFL Development League, and the Victorian Football League. In the latter two, he officiated in grand finals in 2011 and 2013, respectively. In 2014, he was added to the Australian Football League umpiring list, and made his debut in Round 7 of that year, in a match between Hawthorn and St Kilda at the Melbourne Cricket Ground. He umpired 14 matches in his debut season. He officiated in his 50th AFL game in Round 4, 2017, in Greater Western Sydney's 31-point win over Port Adelaide at Manuka Oval. In 2024, O'Gorman began umpiring every week as of round 7. He umpired his 200th game in the round 3 match between Essendon and St Kilda in 2024.
