= Billy Dowling =

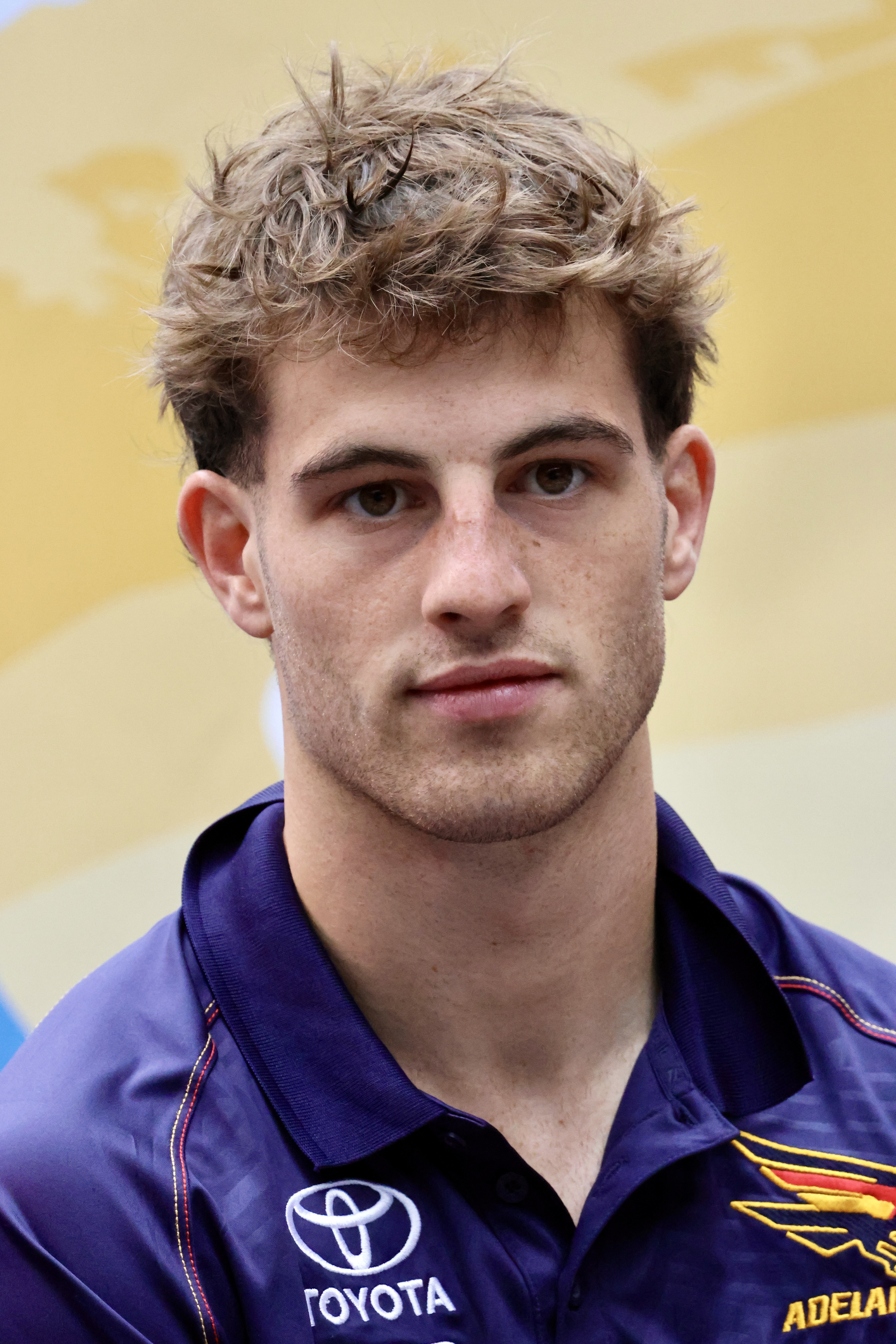
- Dowling at a 2026 Gather Round

Personal information
- Full name: William Edward Dowling
- Born: 1 July 2004 (age 22); Adelaide, Australia
- Original teams: North Adelaide (SANFL), Walkerville Football Club (Adelaide Footy League)
- Draft: No. 43, 2022 national draft
- Debut: Round 13, 2024, Adelaide vs. Richmond, at Adelaide Oval
- Height: 187 cm (6 ft 2 in)
- Weight: 80 kg (176 lb)
- Position: Midfielder

Club information
- Current club: Adelaide
- Number: 31

Playing career^{1}
Years	Club	Games (Goals)
2023–	Adelaide	13 (9)
- ^{1} Playing statistics correct to the end of round 22, 2026.

William Edward Dowling (born 1 July 2004) is a professional Australian rules footballer who was selected by the Adelaide Football Club as the number 43 pick in the 2022 AFL draft. He previously played for North Adelaide in the SANFL at amateur level.

== AFL career ==
Dowling was picked up by Adelaide at pick number 43 in the 2022 national draft from the North Adelaide Football Club.

He shone bright in the SANFL for Adelaide, but struggled to move forward into the senior side due to the strong midfield group of Jordan Dawson, Rory Laird, and Matt Crouch. In July 2023, Dowling added to his rookie contract by signing on until the end of 2026.

After an impressive run of form, and an injury to fellow on-baller Matt Crouch, Dowling's long-awaited debut was announced on 4 June 2024, two days prior to Adelaide's round 13 game against Richmond at the Adelaide Oval. Dowling debuted with 17 disposals, one goal, and nine marks, to finish as the sixth-highest rated Crow of the night (according to AFL Fantasy) in a disheartening loss for the club. After Dan Curtin, Dowling was the second Crow to make his AFL debut in 2024.

Dowling's opportunities at AFL level in 2025 were few as the Crows won the minor premiership. He made a single appearance in the round 24 match against North Melbourne, kicking two goals, but was left out of the squad for the finals series.

In 2026, Dowling capitalised on a late-season opportunity in the round 21 match against Essendon, kicking three goals from 18 disposals on the wing and earning coaches' votes in his 12th senior appearance.

== Statistics ==
Updated to the end of round 22, 2026.

Legend
G	Goals	K	Kicks	D	Disposals	T	Tackles
B	Behinds	H	Handballs	M	Marks

Season	Team	No.	Games	Totals							Averages (per game)							Votes
Season	Team	No.	Games	G	B	K	H	D	M	T	G	B	K	H	D	M	T	Votes
2023	Adelaide	31	0	—	—	—	—	—	—	—	—	—	—	—	—	—	—	0
2024	Adelaide	31	9	4	1	95	58	153	48	17	0.4	0.1	10.6	6.4	17.0	5.3	1.9	0
2025	Adelaide	31	1	2	0	6	8	14	2	0	2.0	0.0	6.0	8.0	14.0	2.0	0.0	0
2026	Adelaide	31	3	3	3	23	21	44	15	11	1.0	1.0	7.7	7.0	14.7	5.0	3.7	0
Career			13	9	4	124	87	211	65	28	0.7	0.3	9.5	6.7	16.2	5.0	2.2	0
