= Brayden Cook =

Australian rules footballer

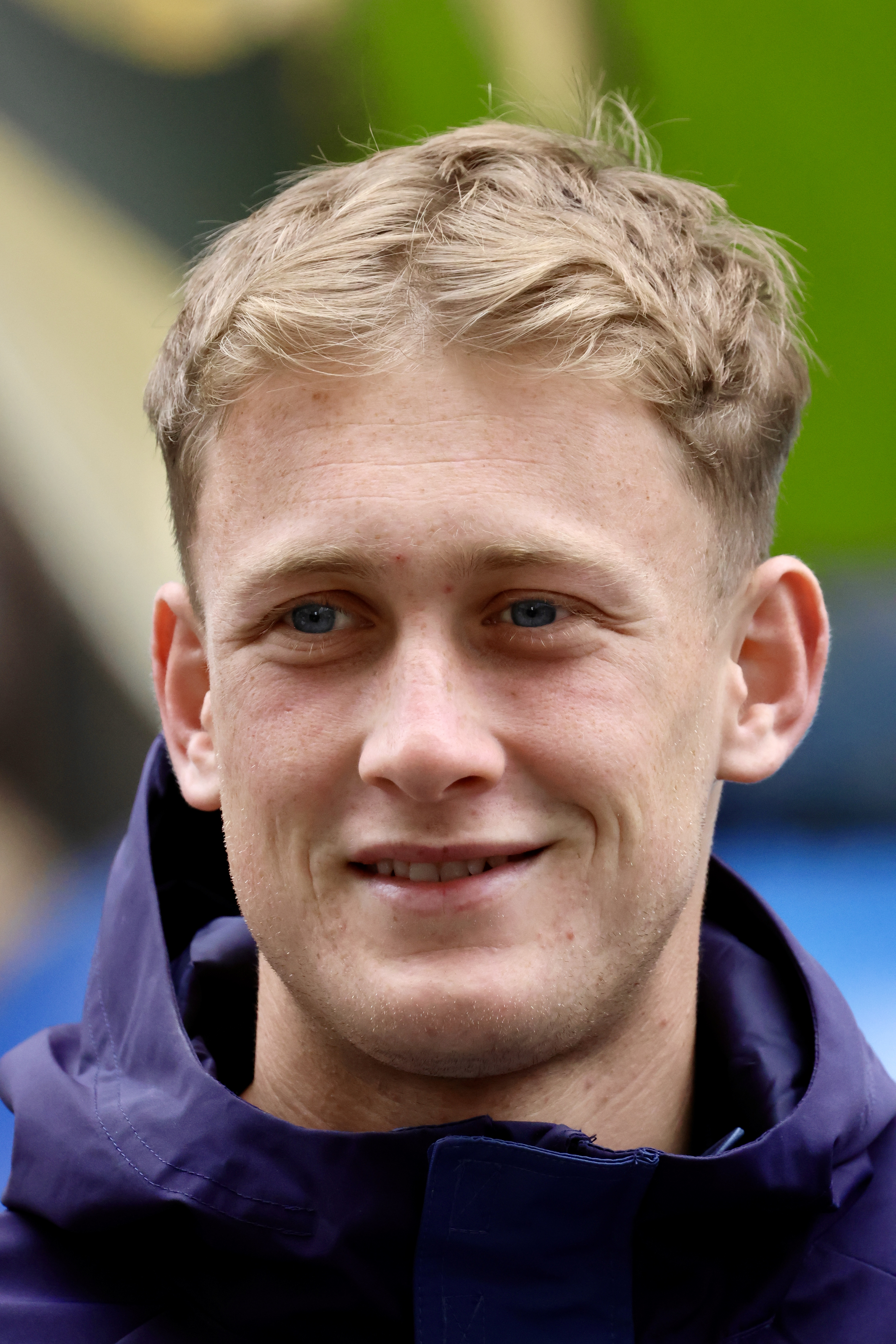
- Cook at the 2026 Gather Round

Personal information
- Nicknames: Chef, Cooky
- Born: 18 July 2002 (age 24); Mount Barker
- Original teams: South Adelaide (SANFL); Happy Valley (SFL)
- Draft: No. 25, 2020 national draft
- Debut: Round 21, 2021, Adelaide vs. Port Adelaide, at Adelaide Oval
- Height: 191 cm (6 ft 3 in)
- Weight: 85 kg (187 lb)
- Position: Wing / Forward

Club information
- Current club: Adelaide
- Number: 15

Playing career^{1}
Years	Club	Games (Goals)
2021–	Adelaide	53 (27)
- ^{1} Playing statistics correct to the end of Elimination Final, 2026.

Brayden Cook (born 18 July 2002) is a professional Australian rules footballer playing for the Adelaide in the Australian Football League (AFL).

== Early career ==
Cook was born in Mount Barker, his family moved to Woodcroft when he was 2. He attended Reynella East College and played his junior career with Happy Valley in the Southern Football League. Cook grew up supporting Adelaide in the AFL.

== AFL career ==
Cook was drafted by Adelaide with pick 25 in the 2020 national draft. He made his debut in round 21 2021 against Port Adelaide and played the final three games of the season. Cook kicked a crucial goal in Adelaide's comeback Showdown win against Port Adelaide in 2022. Cook was unable to perform consistently at the level until 2024, when he kicked a career-high three goals against North Melbourne at Bellerive Oval. He became one of the Crows' first-choice small forwards for the remainder of the year as Izak Rankine made a move to the midfield.

The start to the 2026 AFL season was electric for Cook, who displayed strong performances of kicking efficiency while playing across half-back and on a wing. He was nominated for Goal of the Year in round 6 for his score from the pocket against St Kilda. Two weeks later, Cook kicked the match-winning goal for the Crows with 12 seconds remaining in the Showdown against Port Adelaide in round 8, etching himself into club folklore.

In June 2026, Cook's breakout season was rewarded with a contract extension at the Crows, keeping him at the club until at least the end of 2028.

== Statistics ==
Updated to the end of round 22, 2026.

Legend
G	Goals	K	Kicks	D	Disposals	T	Tackles
B	Behinds	H	Handballs	M	Marks

Season	Team	No.	Games	Totals							Averages (per game)							Votes
Season	Team	No.	Games	G	B	K	H	D	M	T	G	B	K	H	D	M	T	Votes
2021	Adelaide	15	3	0	0	22	20	42	6	3	0.0	0.0	7.3	6.7	14.0	2.0	1.0	0
2022	Adelaide	15	8	3	2	56	27	83	13	14	0.4	0.3	7.0	3.4	10.4	1.6	1.8	0
2023	Adelaide	15	1	0	1	10	6	16	5	2	0.0	1.0	10.0	6.0	16.0	5.0	2.0	0
2024	Adelaide	15	15	12	5	83	56	139	33	22	0.8	0.3	5.5	3.7	9.3	2.2	1.5	0
2025	Adelaide	15	3	0	0	13	5	18	4	7	0.0	0.0	4.3	1.7	6.0	1.3	2.3	0
2026	Adelaide	15	20	8	5	223	115	338	90	36	0.4	0.3	11.2	5.8	16.9	4.5	1.8	0
Career			50	23	13	407	229	636	151	84	0.5	0.3	8.1	4.6	12.7	3.0	1.7	0
