= Will Hamill (footballer, born 2000) =

Australian football league player

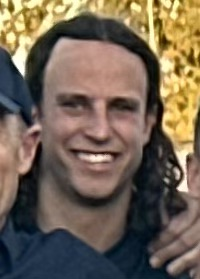
- Hamill in 2025

Personal information
- Born: 17 November 2000 (age 25); Dromana, Victoria
- Draft: No. 30, 2018 AFL draft (Adelaide); No. 9, 2024 rookie draft (Adelaide)
- Debut: 21 June 2020, Adelaide vs. Gold Coast, at Carrara Stadium
- Height: 187 cm (6 ft 2 in)
- Weight: 80 kg (176 lb)
- Position: Defender

Club information
- Current club: Frankston

Playing career
Years	Club	Games (Goals)
2019–2024	Adelaide	45 (1)

Will Hamill (born 17 November 2000) is an Australian rules footballer who currently plays for the Frankston Football Club in the Victorian Football League (VFL). He previously played for Adelaide in the Australian Football League (AFL) after being recruited with the 30th pick of the 2018 national draft.

== Early Football ==
Hamill represented Vic Country at the AFL Under 18 Championships for the 2018 season. He also played with the Dandenong Stingrays in the NAB League for two seasons, named as one of the best in their premiership in 2018.

== AFL career ==
Hamill debuted in the Crows' 53-point loss against the Gold Coast Suns in the third round of the 2020 AFL season. He collected 9 disposals, 2 marks and one tackle in his first game.

== Statistics ==
Legend
G	Goals	K	Kicks	D	Disposals	T	Tackles
B	Behinds	H	Handballs	M	Marks

Season	Team	No.	Games	Totals							Averages (per game)							Votes
Season	Team	No.	Games	G	B	K	H	D	M	T	G	B	K	H	D	M	T	Votes
2019	Adelaide	17	0	—	—	—	—	—	—	—	—	—	—	—	—	—	—	0
2020 (Note: The 2020 season was played with 17 home-and-away matches per team (down from 22) and 16-minute quarters with time on (down from 20-minute quarters with time on) due to the impact of the COVID-19 pandemic.)	Adelaide	17	8	0	0	33	35	68	15	14	0.0	0.0	4.1	4.4	8.5	1.9	1.8	0
2021	Adelaide	17	17	0	0	94	79	173	27	35	0.0	0.0	5.5	4.6	10.2	1.6	2.1	0
2022	Adelaide	17	13	1	0	59	64	123	23	24	0.1	0.0	4.5	4.9	9.5	1.8	1.8	0
2023	Adelaide	17	0	—	—	—	—	—	—	—	—	—	—	—	—	—	—	0
2024	Adelaide	17	7	0	0	54	28	82	20	15	0.0	0.0	7.7	4.0	11.7	2.9	2.1	0
2025	Adelaide	17	0	—	—	—	—	—	—	—	—	—	—	—	—	—	—	0
Career			45	1	0	240	206	446	85	88	0.0	0.0	5.3	4.6	9.9	1.9	2.0	0
