= Maddi Newman =

Australian rules footballer (born 2001)

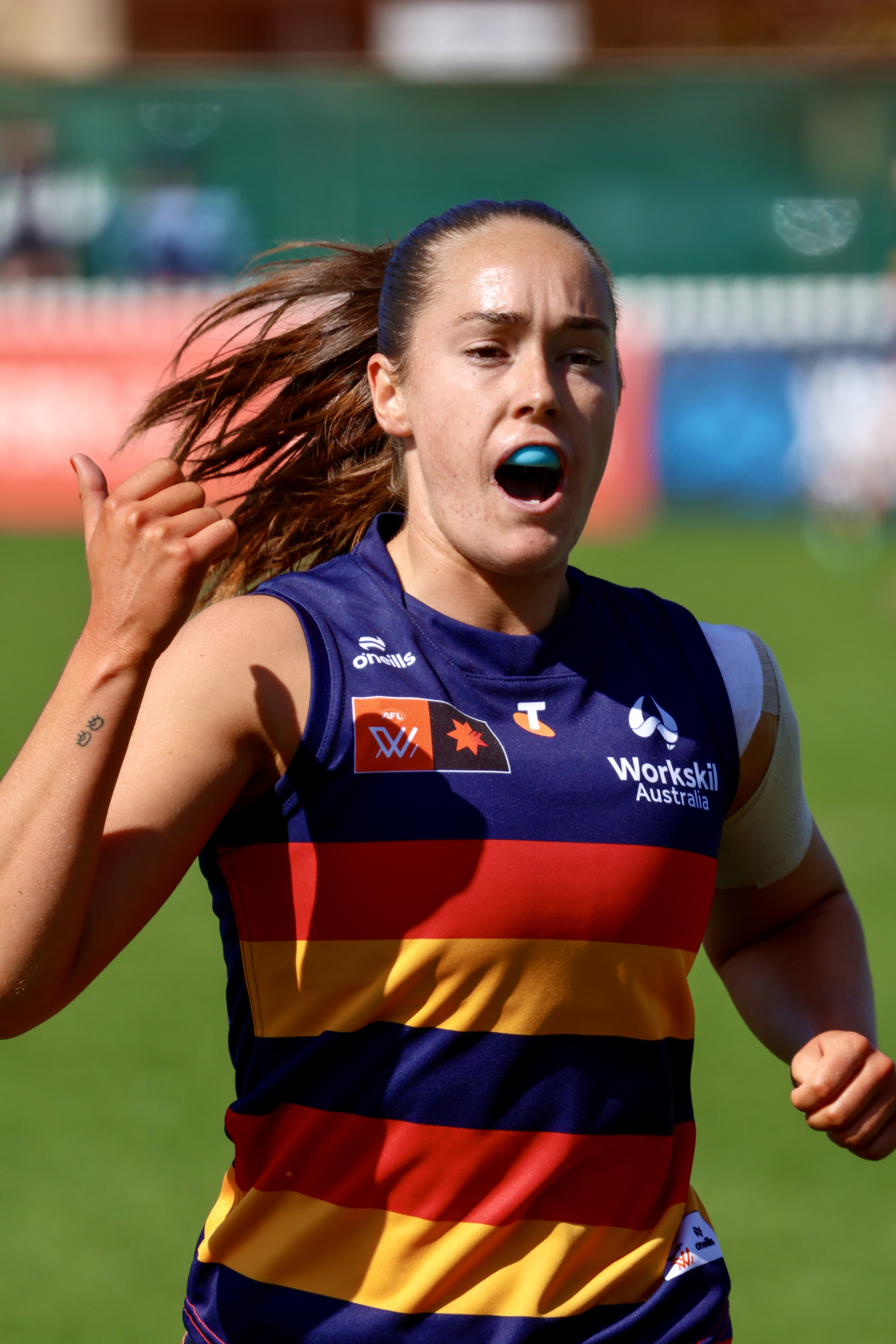
- Newman in August 2026

Personal information
- Full name: Madison Newman
- Born: 10 May 2001 (age 25)
- Original team: West Adelaide (SANFLW)
- Draft: No. 100, 2019 national draft
- Debut: Round 1, 2020, Adelaide vs. Brisbane, at Hickey Park
- Height: 170 cm (5 ft 7 in)
- Position: Midfielder

Club information
- Current club: Adelaide
- Number: 17

Playing career^{1}
Years	Club	Games (Goals)
2020–	Adelaide	68 (13)
- ^{1} Playing statistics correct to the end of round 1, 2026.

Madison Newman (born 10 May 2001) is an Australian rules footballer playing for the Adelaide Football Club in the AFL Women's (AFLW).

== AFL Women's career ==
Drafted with pick 100 in the 2019 AFL Women's draft, Newman didn't take long to debut for the Adelaide Crows, doing so in the first round of the 2020 season against Brisbane at Hickey Park.

Despite being drafted as a defender, a move to the wing in 2023 reignited Newman's young career. She had a break-out year in 2023 which included a career-best performance against Gold Coast, when she collected 25 disposals and nine marks. She bested herself the following season, amassing 27 disposals against Fremantle

Newman was among Adelaide's best in a 2024 match against Greater Western Sydney when the Crows beat the Giants by 64 points. She kicked a goal from her 17 disposals.

Following a successful 2024 campaign, Newman extended her contract at the Crows for an additional year. The midfielder averaged 19.4 disposals and finished eighth in the club's best & fairest.

== In the media ==
On February 8, 2022, Madison became the sixth guest to join sports journalism brand Featuring Faulks.

Along with twin sister Hallie, Newman owns a clothing label called Seeing Double. The sisters are also prolific on TikTok.
