= Hugh Bond (footballer) =

Australian rules footballer (born 2004)

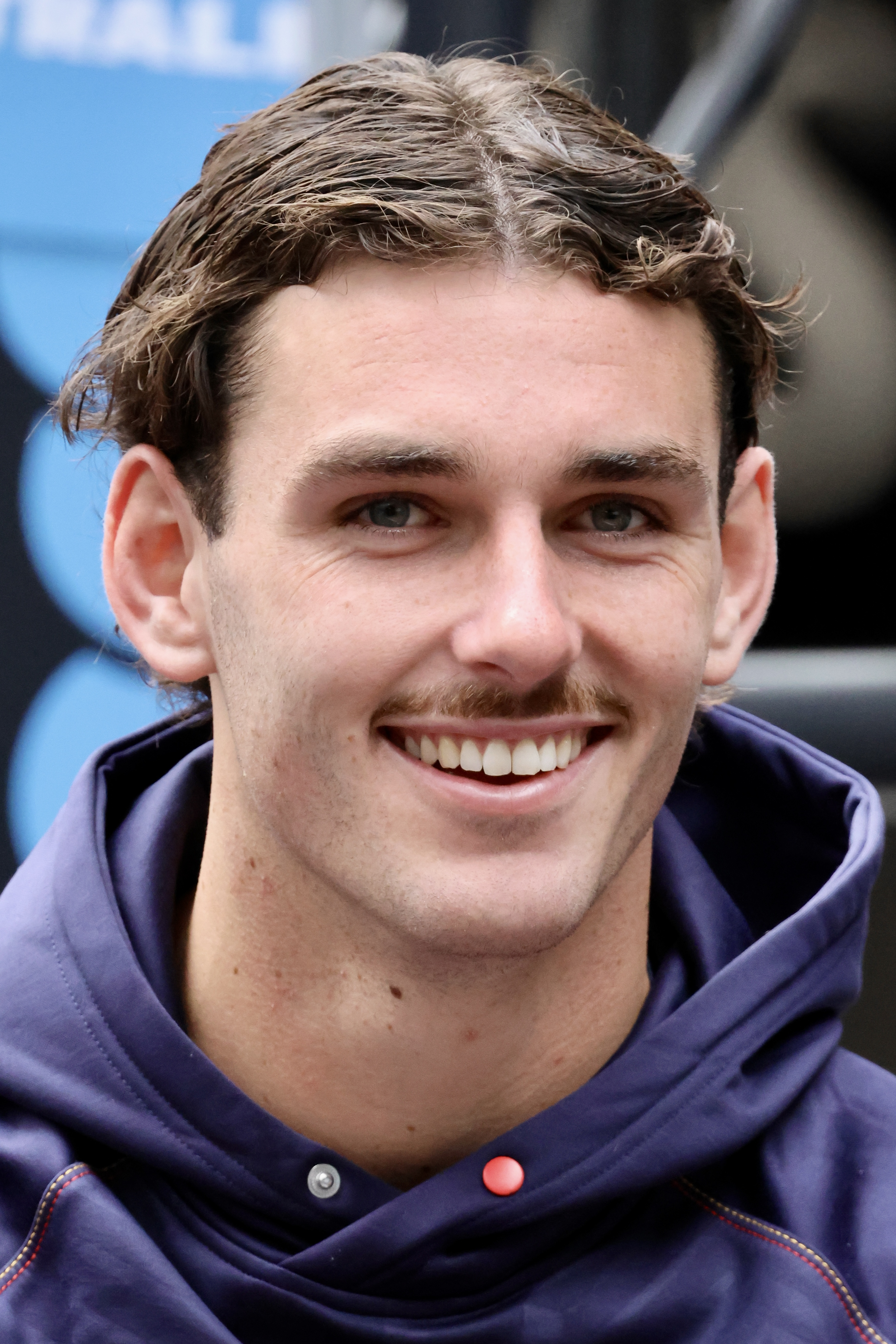
- Bond at the 2026 Gather Round

Personal information
- Full name: Hugh Bond
- Born: 25 September 2004 (age 22); Victoria, Australia
- Original teams: North Ballarat Football Club (Ballarat Football League), Greater Western Victoria Rebels (Talent League)
- Draft: No. 50, 2022 national draft
- Debut: Round 18, 2024, Adelaide vs. St Kilda, at Adelaide Oval
- Height: 185 cm (6 ft 1 in)

Club information
- Current club: Adelaide
- Number: 21

Playing career^{1}
| Years | Club | Games (Goals) |
| 2023– | Adelaide | 19 (0) |
- ^{1} Playing statistics correct to the end of round 22, 2026.

Hugh Bond (born 25 September 2004) is an Australian rules footballer who plays for the Adelaide Football Club in the Australian Football League (AFL). Bond was selected with the 50th pick in the 2022 national draft, and he made his AFL debut in 2024.

== Early life ==
Bond grew up on a 50-acre farm and begun his football career by joining Auskick in Horsham, Victoria. He went on to play for the North Ballarat Football Club in the Ballarat Football League.

In 2021, Bond represented Ballarat Grammar School and his home state of Victoria in rowing; however, a stress fracture due to the physical overload of both sports forced him to abandon rowing in favour of football.

In 2022, Bond played 12 games for the Greater Western Victoria Rebels in the Talent League and was noted for his ability to hunt the ball as well as his competitiveness. Bond also represented Victoria Country in the AFL U18 Championships.

== AFL career ==
Bond was selected by Adelaide at pick 50 in the 3rd round of the 2022 national draft from the Greater Western Victoria Rebels. Prior to his debut in the AFL side, Bond played 12 games for Adelaide's reserve team in the SANFL.

Bond's AFL debut was in round 18 of the 2024 season, making him the 264th capped player for the Adelaide Crows, and the club's 4th debutant for the year. Following his successful debut, Bond did not miss another match for the rest of the year, and coach Matthew Nicks credited Bond's "ruthless competitiveness", also saying that Bond makes his teammates "stand taller". When his contract expired at the end of 2024, Bond signed with Adelaide for an additional year.

Following an injury to defender Max Michalanney in 2025, Bond made his return to the AFL in round 21 against Hawthorn. He impressed early in the game with six first-quarter disposals. Bond played his first final a few weeks later against Collingwood, but was omitted from the team following the loss.

== Statistics ==
Updated to the end of round 22, 2026.

Legend
| G | Goals | K | Kicks | D | Disposals | T | Tackles |
| B | Behinds | H | Handballs | M | Marks |

| Season | Team | No. | Games | Totals | | | | | | | Averages (per game) | | | | | | | Votes |
| Season | Team | No. | Games | G | B | K | H | D | M | T | G | B | K | H | D | M | T | Votes |
|---|---|---|---|---|---|---|---|---|---|---|---|---|---|---|---|---|---|---|
| 2023 | Adelaide | 40 | 0 | — | — | — | — | — | — | — | — | — | — | — | — | — | — | 0 |
| 2024 | Adelaide | 40 | 7 | 0 | 0 | 22 | 33 | 55 | 9 | 27 | 0.0 | 0.0 | 3.1 | 4.7 | 7.9 | 1.3 | 3.9 | 0 |
| 2025 | Adelaide | 40 | 5 | 0 | 0 | 20 | 27 | 47 | 8 | 14 | 0.0 | 0.0 | 4.0 | 5.4 | 9.4 | 1.6 | 2.8 | 0 |
| 2026 | Adelaide | 21 | 7 | 0 | 1 | 53 | 24 | 77 | 22 | 17 | 0.0 | 0.1 | 7.6 | 3.4 | 11.0 | 3.1 | 2.4 | 0 |
| Career | | | 19 | 0 | 1 | 95 | 84 | 179 | 39 | 58 | 0.0 | 0.1 | 5.0 | 4.4 | 9.4 | 2.1 | 3.1 | 0 |
