= 2026 Adelaide Football Club season =

Adelaide Crows AFL season

Adelaide Football Club
2026 AFL season
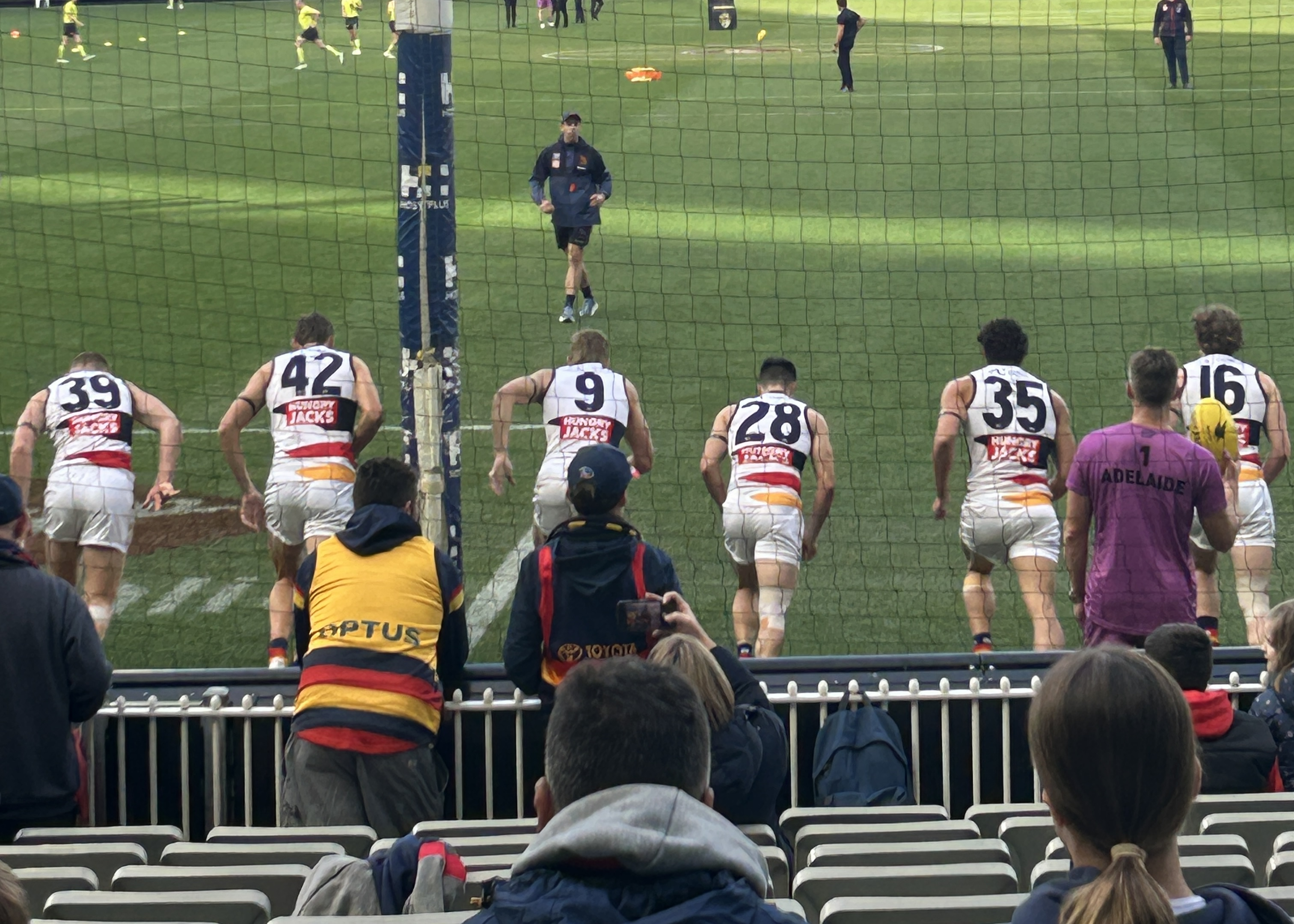
- Adelaide players warming up before the round nine match against Richmond
- Coach: Matthew Nicks
- Captain: Jordan Dawson
- Home ground: Adelaide Oval
- Home & Away: 6th
- Finals: Semi-finals
- Leading goalkicker: Josh Rachele (42)
- Highest home attendance: 53,045
- Lowest home attendance: 40,165
- Average home attendance: 46,771

The 2026 Adelaide Football Club season was the Adelaide Crows' 36th season of senior competition in the Australian Football League (AFL). Adelaide's women's team played their eleventh season in the AFLW, and the men's reserves team played their twelfth season in the South Australian National Football League (SANFL).

The Adelaide Crows women's team played their first season under head coach Ryan Davis following the departure of Matthew Clarke in 2025.

== Overview ==
Adelaide's 2026 board
CEO	Chairman	Deputy chair	Board							
Tim Silvers	John Olsen	Linda Fellows	Neil Balme	Shanti Berggren	Richard Fennell	James Gallagher	Graeme Goodings	Imelda Lynch	Grant Stevens	Stephen Roche

Adelaide's 2026 season overview
League	Captain	Coach	Home ground	W-D-L	Ladder	Finals	Best and fairest	Leading goalkicker
AFL	Jordan Dawson	Matthew Nicks	Adelaide Oval	15–0–8	6th	Semi Finals	Jordan Dawson	Josh Rachele (42)
AFLW	Ebony Marinoff	Ryan Davis	Unley Oval	5–0–7	11th	DNQ		Caitlin Gould (10)
SANFL	Kieran Strachan	Matthew Wright	—N/a	7–0–11	7th	DNQ	Blake Drury	Blake Drury (31)

=== Kits ===
Manufacturer: O'Neills
Sponsors: Toyota, Hungry Jack's, Adelaide University

Home	Clash	Gather Round

== Men's squad ==
Reflects the squad during the final game of their season.

Adelaide Football Club · AFL personnel
Senior list		Rookie list	Coaching staff
1 Chayce Jones; 2 Ben Keays (vc); 3 Sam Berry; 4 Callum Ah Chee; 5 Sid Draper; 6 Daniel Curtin; 7 Riley Thilthorpe; 8 Josh Rachele; 9 Nick Murray; 10 Luke Pedlar; 11 Charlie Edwards; 12 Jordan Dawson (c); 13 Taylor Walker; 14 Jake Soligo; 15 Brayden Cook; 16 Max Michalanney; 19 Zac Taylor; 20 Mitch Hinge; 21 Hugh Bond	22 Oscar Ryan; 23 Izak Rankine; 24 Josh Worrell; 25 James Peatling; 26 Mitchell Marsh; 27 Luke Nankervis; 28 Alex Neal-Bullen (vc); 29 Rory Laird; 30 Wayne Milera; 31 Billy Dowling; 32 Darcy Fogarty; 34 Archie Ludowyke; 36 Finnbar Maley; 38 Lachlan Sholl; 41 Jordon Butts; 43 Reilly O'Brien; 44 Isaac Cumming; 48 Mark Keane	17 Tyler Welsh; 33 Indy Cotton (B); 35 James Borlase; 39 Toby Murray; 40 Hugo Hall-Kahan; 42 Lachlan McAndrew	Head coach: Matthew Nicks; Assistant coaches: Murray Davis (director); Scott Burns (senior assistant & forwards); Nathan van Berlo (midfield); Jack Hombsch (defence); Sam Baulderstone (ruck); Michael Godden (head of development); Chelsea Randall (development); Andrew McPherson (development); Legend: (c) Captain(s); (vc) Vice-captain(s); (B) - Category B rookie; italics - Inactive player list; (ret.) - Retired; Long-term injury; Updated: 5 November 2026; Source(s): Senior list, Rookie list, Coaching staff, Injuries

=== Squad changes ===
The following off-season changes were made to the squad prior to the 2026 season.

==== Out ====
No.	Name	Position	New Club	via	Ref.
5	(Victoria (state)) Matt Crouch	Midfielder	—N/a	Retirement	
36	(Republic of Ireland) Karl Gallagher	Forward	Monaghan GAA	Delisted	
4	(South Australia) Lachlan Murphy	Forward	Port Noarlunga	Delisted	
45	(South Australia) Harry Schoenberg	Midfielder	West Coast	Delisted	
45	(Victoria (state)) Kieran Strachan	Ruck	Adelaide (SANFL)	Delisted	
33	(South Australia) Brodie Smith	Defender	Seaton Ramblers	Retirement	
21	(South Australia) Chris Burgess	Forward	West Adelaide; Paskeville FNC	Delisted	
17	(South Australia) Tyler Welsh	Forward	Adelaide	Delisted	

==== In ====
No.	Name	Position	Previous club	via	Ref.
33	(South Australia) Indy Cotton	Utility	BA Centre of Excellence	Category B rookie	
36	(Victoria (state)) Finnbar Maley	Forward	North Melbourne	Trade with North Melbourne	
26	(South Australia) Mitchell Marsh	Forward	West Adelaide	No. 22, 2025 national draft	
34	(Victoria (state)) Archie Ludowyke	Forward	Sandringham Dragons	No. 50, 2025 national draft	
4	(Western Australia) Callum Ah Chee	Utility	Brisbane Lions	No. 1, 2026 pre-season draft	
17	(South Australia) Tyler Welsh	Forward	Adelaide	No. 11, 2025 rookie draft	
40	(Victoria (state)) Hugo Hall-Kahan	Defender	Williamstown	No. 10, 2026 mid-season rookie draft	

Italics: Relisted as a rookie

== Men's AFL season ==
=== Pre-season matches ===
Adelaide's 2026 practice match and AFL Community Series fixtures
Date and local time	Opponent	Scores			Venue	Ref.
Date and local time	Opponent	Home	Away	Result	Venue	Ref.
Friday, 20 February (5:30 pm)	Port Adelaide	10.15 (75)	14.10 (94)	Won by 19 points	Alberton Oval	
Saturday, 28 February (3:10 pm)	Fremantle	12.12 (84)	9.14 (68)	Lost by 16 points	Rushton Park	

=== Regular season ===
Adelaide's 2026 AFL season fixture
Round	Date and local time	Opponent	Home	Away	Result	Venue	Attendance	Ladder position	Ref.
Round	Date and local time	Opponent	Scores			Venue	Attendance	Ladder position	Ref.
0	Bye							11th	Bye
1	Saturday, 14 March (7:35 pm)	Collingwood	11.13 (79)	13.15 (93)	Won by 14 points	Melbourne Cricket Ground (A)	62,482	5th ▲	
2	Friday, 20 March (7:10 pm)	Western Bulldogs	13.10 (88)	14.11 (94)	Lost by 6 points	Adelaide Oval (H)	49,185	8th ▼	
3	Thursday, 26 March (7:30 pm)	Geelong	9.14 (68)	9.6 (60)	Lost by 8 points	Kardinia Park (A)	20,403	12th ▼	
4	Friday, 3 April (6:45 pm)	Fremantle	11.10 (76)	11.12 (78)	Lost by 2 points	Adelaide Oval (H)	48,627	13th ▼	
5	Thursday, 9 April (7:10 pm)	Carlton	17.12 (114)	12.14 (86)	Won by 28 points	Adelaide Oval (N)	49,184	11th ▲	
6	Saturday, 18 April (7:05 pm)	St Kilda	15.13 (103)	15.12 (102)	Won by 1 point	Adelaide Oval (H)	45,854	10th ▲	
7	Saturday, 26 April (3:15;pm)	Brisbane Lions	19.13 (127)	11.9 (75)	Lost by 52 points	The Gabba (A)	32,629	13th ▼	
8	Friday, 1 May (7:40 pm)	Port Adelaide	11.10 (76)	11.9 (75)	Won by 1 point	Adelaide Oval (H)	53,045	11th ▲	
9	Sunday, 10 May (3:15 pm)	Richmond	9.7 (61)	14.14 (98)	Won by 37 points	Melbourne Cricket Ground (A)	22,123	8th ▲	
10	Saturday, 16 May (12:45 pm)	North Melbourne	20.13 (133)	9.11 (65)	Won by 68 points	Adelaide Oval (H)	41,313	8th	
11	Thursday, 21 May (7:30 pm)	Hawthorn	10.15 (75)	9.12 (66)	Lost by 9 points	York Park (A)	8,312	7th ▲	
12	Bye							8th ▼	Bye
13	Thursday, 4 June (7:00 pm)	Geelong	11.9 (75)	10.14 (74)	Won by 1 point	Adelaide Oval (H)	42,340	8th	
14	Thursday, 11 June (7:30 pm)	Western Bulldogs	9.10 (64)	19.7 (121)	Won by 57 points	Docklands Stadium (A)	22,761	6th ▲	
15	Saturday, 20 June (12:45 pm)	Melbourne	11.13 (79)	9.8 (62)	Won by 17 points	Adelaide Oval (H)	46,337	5th ▲	
16	Saturday, 27 June (7:05 pm)	Port Adelaide	13.19 (97)	11.5 (71)	Lost by 26 points	Adelaide Oval (A)	50,087	6th ▼	
17	Friday, 3 July (6:10 pm)	West Coast	11.8 (74)	15.9 (99)	Won by 25 points	Perth Stadium (A)	40,770	5th ▲	
18	Saturday, 11 July (7:40 pm)	Gold Coast	19.14 (128)	7.7 (49)	Won by 79 points	Adelaide Oval (H)	40,165	5th	
19	Friday, 17 July (7:40 pm)	Sydney	10.11 (71)	13.9 (87)	Won by 16 points	Sydney Cricket Ground (A)	33,413	5th	
20	Thursday, 23 July (7:00 pm)	Collingwood	11.8 (74)	16.12 (108)	Lost by 34 points	Adelaide Oval (H)	50,109	5th	
21	Saturday, 2 August (4:40 pm)	Essendon	11.7 (73)	23.7 (145)	Won by 72 points	Docklands Stadium (A)	20,518	4th ▲	
22	Saturday, 8 August (7:05 pm)	Richmond	9.9 (63)	7.12 (54)	Won by 9 points	Adelaide Oval (H)	42,762	5th ▼	
23	Friday, 14 August (7:40 pm)	Fremantle	16.16 (112)	13.10 (88)	Lost by 24 points	Perth Stadium (A)	55,010	7th ▼	
24	Saturday, 22 August (7:40 pm)	Greater Western Sydney	24.13 (157)	15.11 (101)	Won by 56 points	Adelaide Oval (H)	52,332	6th ▲	

Opening Round
Gather Round

=== Ladder ===
Pos	Team	Pld	W	L	D	PF	PA	PP	Pts	Qualification
1	Fremantle	23	19	4	0	2286	1666	137.2	76	Finals series
2	Sydney	23	18	5	0	2543	1869	136.1	72	Finals series
3	Brisbane Lions (P)	23	16	7	0	2499	2054	121.7	64	Finals series
4	Hawthorn	23	15	6	2	2260	1881	120.1	64	Finals series
5	Geelong	23	15	8	0	2355	1925	122.3	60	Finals series
6	Adelaide	23	15	8	0	2169	1849	117.3	60	Finals series
7	Melbourne	23	15	8	0	2301	2099	109.6	60	Finals series
8	Western Bulldogs	23	13	9	1	1901	1992	95.4	54	Finals series
9	Collingwood	23	12	9	2	2021	1974	102.4	52	Finals series
10	Carlton	23	12	10	1	2007	1978	101.5	50	Finals series
11	St Kilda	23	10	13	0	2030	1974	102.8	40	
12	Greater Western Sydney	23	10	13	0	2073	2095	98.9	40	
13	Gold Coast	23	9	14	0	2011	2128	94.5	36	
14	North Melbourne	23	9	14	0	1932	2175	88.8	36	
15	Port Adelaide	23	7	16	0	1804	2048	88.1	28	
16	West Coast	23	4	19	0	1615	2333	69.2	16	
17	Richmond	23	3	20	0	1483	2373	62.5	12	
18	Essendon	23	2	21	0	1601	2478	64.6	8	

Source: afl.com.au
Rules for classification: 1) points; 2) percentage; 3) number of points for
(P) Premiers

=== Finals ===
Adelaide's 2026 AFL Finals series
Match	Date and local time	Opponent	Home	Away	Result	Venue	Attendance	Ref.
Match	Date and local time	Opponent	Scores			Venue	Attendance	Ref.
EF	Saturday, 5 September (7:05 pm)	Western Bulldogs	14.6 (90)	9.14 (68)	Won by 22 points	Adelaide Oval (H)	51,370	
SF	Saturday, 12 September (7:35 pm)	Brisbane Lions	21.18 (144)	13.13 (91)	Lost by 53 points	The Gabba (A)	36,026	

== Men's summary ==
=== Milestones ===
Debuts

- Round 1: Ah Chee (club debut)
- Round 1: McAndrew (club debut)
- Round 1: T. Murray (AFL debut)
- Round 3: Maley (club debut)
- Round 6: Edwards (AFL debut)
- Round 13: Hall-Kahan (AFL debut)
- Round 21: Ludowyke (AFL debut)
- Round 21: Ryan (AFL debut)

Games milestones

- Round 4: Jones (100 games)
- Round 11: Dawson (100 club games)
- Round 18: Soligo (100 games)
- Round 20: Keays (150 club games)
- Round 20: Nicks (150 games coached)
- Round 22: Cook (50 games)

Goals milestones

- Round 1: Fogarty (200 goals)
- Round 2: Rachele (100 goals)
- Round 5: Rankine (100 club goals)
- Round 18: Keays (150 goals)
- Round 20: Walker (700 goals)
- Round 22: Dawson (100 goals)
- Round 23: Thilthorpe (150 goals)

AFL Life Membership

- Round 23: Laird (300 official matches)

=== AFL Awards & Nominations ===
2026 All-Australian team

- Final team: Dawson (vc), Milera
- Extended squad: Rankine

22under22 team

- Extended squad: Curtin

AFL Player's Association Awards

- Best captain winner: Dawson
- Most valuable player nominees: Berry, Dawson, Milera
- Best first-year player nominee: Ludowyke
- Most courageous player winner: Dawson

== Women's squad ==
Adelaide Football Club · AFL Women's personnel
Senior list		Rookie list	Coaching staff
1 Caitlin Gould; 2 Eloise Jones (vc); 3 Grace Egan; 4 Lily Tarlinton; 5 Chloe Bown; 6 Hannah Munyard; 7 Keeley Kustermann; 8 India Rasheed; 9 Hannah Ewings; 10 Ebony Marinoff (c); 11 Sarah Goodwin; 12 Chelsea Biddell; 13 Kiera Mueller; 14 Ava Stewart; 15 Danielle Ponter; 16 Georgia McKee; 17 Maddi Newman	18 Brooke Smith; 20 Grace Kelly; 21 Lucy Waye; 23 Niamh Kelly; 25 Teah Charlton; 27 Alicia Blizard; 28 Brooke Tonon; 30 Juliet Kelly; 31 Alice Tentye; 32 Jess Allan; 33 Olivia Gorman; 34 Jemmika Douglas; 39 Sarah Allan	19 Christina Leuzzi; 22 Kayleigh Cronin; 24 Amy Boyle-Carr	Head coach: Ryan Davis; Assistant coaches: Courtney Cramey (back line); Kieran Strachan (midfield); Marijana Randall (forward line); Emma Sampson (development); Legend: (c) Captain(s); (vc) Vice-captain(s); italics – Inactive; (ret) Retired; Pregnancy; Long-term injury; Updated: 5 November 2026; Source(s): Players, coaches, injuries

=== Squad changes ===
The following off-season changes were made to the squad prior to the 2026 season.

==== Out ====
No.	Name	Position	New Club	via	Ref.
27	(South Australia) Abbie Ballard	Forward	—N/a	Delisted	
5	(South Australia) Rachelle Martin	Midfielder	—N/a	Delisted	
14	(Queensland) Stevie-Lee Thompson	Midfielder	West Adelaide	Retirement	
33	(South Australia) Anne Hatchard	Midfielder	Gold Coast	Trade with Gold Coast	
4	(South Australia) Zoe Prowse	Defender	Essendon	Trade with Essendon	
3	(South Australia) Brooke Boileau	Midfielder	Carlton	Trade with Carlton and Brisbane	
26	(Western Australia) Chelsea Randall	Midfielder	—N/a	Retirement	

==== In ====
No.	Name	Position	Previous club	via	Ref.
3	(Victoria (state)) Grace Egan	Midfielder	Richmond	Trade with Richmond	
5	(Victoria (state)) Chloe Bown	Midfielder	Oakleigh Chargers	No. 5, 2025 national draft	
21	(South Australia) Lucy Waye	Forward	West Adelaide	No. 21, 2025 national draft	
33	(Victoria (state)) Olivia Gorman	Midfielder	Northern Knights	No. 25, 2025 national draft	
27	(Western Australia) Alicia Blizard	Forward	East Fremantle	No. 39, 2025 national draft	
14	(Western Australia) Ava Stewart	Utility	Swan Districts	No. 63, 2025 national draft	
30	(Western Australia) Juliet Kelly	Utility	Claremont	Replacement signing	
31	(South Australia) Alice Tentye	Midfielder	Woodville-West Torrens	Replacement signing	
34	(Victoria (state)) Jemmika Douglas	Utility	North Melbourne (VFLW)	Replacement signing	

== Women's AFLW season ==
=== Pre-season matches ===
Adelaide's 2026 practice match and match simulation fixtures
Date and local time	Opponent	Scores			Venue	Ref.
Date and local time	Opponent	Home	Away	Result	Venue	Ref.
Friday, 10 July (12:30 pm)	Fremantle	10.7 (67)	8.4 (52)	Lost by 15 points	Fremantle Oval	
Saturday, 18 July (2:00 pm)	West Coast	9.6 (60)	6.6 (42)	Won by 18 points	Football Park	
Saturday, 25 July (1:00 pm)	St Kilda	10.11 (71)	4.2 (26)	Won by 45 points	Unley Oval	
Sunday, 2 August	Port Adelaide			Won by 5 goals	Football Park	

=== Regular season ===
Adelaide's 2026 AFL Women's season fixture
Round	Date and local time	Opponent	Home	Away	Result	Venue	Attendance	Ladder position	Ref.
Round	Date and local time	Opponent	Scores			Venue	Attendance	Ladder position	Ref.
1	Sunday, 16 August (2:05 pm)	Sydney	7.11 (53)	9.7 (61)	Lost by 8 points	Unley Oval (H)	3,640	10th	
2	Sunday, 23 August (1:05 pm)	Carlton	7.8 (50)	3.5 (23)	Lost by 27 points	Princes Park (A)	2,012	14th ▼	
3	Sunday, 29 August (2:05 pm)	West Coast	9.6 (60)	6.7 (43)	Won by 17 points	Unley Oval (H)	2,764	13th ▲	
4	Sunday, 6 September (1:05 pm)	Hawthorn	5.9 (39)	10.7 (67)	Won by 28 points	Kennedy Community Centre (A)	3,424	10th ▲	
5	Saturday, 12 September (2:35 pm)	Geelong	6.10 (46)	8.9 (57)	Lost by 11 points	Unley Oval (H)	2,560	12th ▼	
6	Sunday, 20 September (5:05 pm)	Brisbane	4.6 (30)	5.9 (39)	Won by 9 points	Springfield Central Stadium (A)	2,936	11th ▲	
7	Sunday, 27 September (12:35 pm)	Fremantle	5.5 (35)	9.6 (60)	Lost by 25 points	Unley Oval (H)	2,312	11th	
8	Saturday, 3 October (6:45 pm)	Port Adelaide	5.6 (36)	2.10 (22)	Lost by 14 points	Alberton Oval (A)	5,441	12th ▼	
9	Saturday, 10 October (7:15 pm)	Richmond	4.6 (30)	9.8 (62)	Won by 32 points	Princes Park (A)	1,554	10th ▲	
10	Saturday, 17 October (12:35 pm)	Gold Coast	10.3 (63)	7.11 (53)	Won by 10 points	Unley Oval (H)	2,150	9th ▲	
11	Sunday, 25 October (1:05 pm)	North Melbourne	5.8 (38)	4.5 (29)	Lost by 9 points	North Hobart Oval (A)	935	9th	
12	Sunday, 1 November (2:35 pm)	Melbourne	3.11 (29)	6.11 (47)	lost by 18 points	Unley Oval (H)		11th ▼	

=== Ladder ===
Pos	Team	Pld	W	L	D	PF	PA	PP	Pts	Qualification
1	North Melbourne	12	11	1	0	789	320	246.6	44	Finals series
2	Geelong	12	11	1	0	871	484	180.0	44	Finals series
3	Melbourne	12	10	2	0	715	405	176.5	40	Finals series
4	Carlton	12	9	3	0	554	416	133.2	36	Finals series
5	Gold Coast	12	9	3	0	609	458	133.0	36	Finals series
6	Sydney	12	9	3	0	606	527	115.0	36	Finals series
7	Western Bulldogs	12	8	4	0	495	448	110.5	32	Finals series
8	Hawthorn	12	7	5	0	580	513	113.1	28	Finals series
9	Port Adelaide	12	6	6	0	422	454	93.0	24	
10	Fremantle	12	5	7	0	477	489	97.5	20	
11	Adelaide	12	5	7	0	528	544	97.1	20	
12	Brisbane	12	4	8	0	504	502	100.4	16	
13	West Coast	12	4	8	0	459	656	70.0	16	
14	Richmond	12	4	8	0	468	714	65.5	16	
15	Greater Western Sydney	12	2	10	0	479	691	69.3	8	
16	Essendon	12	2	10	0	386	646	59.8	8	
17	Collingwood	12	1	11	0	350	646	54.2	4	
18	St Kilda	12	1	11	0	332	711	46.7	4	

Source: afl.com.au
Rules for classification: 1) points; 2) percentage; 3) number of points for

== Women's summary ==
=== Milestones ===
Debuts

- Round 1: Bown (AFLW debut)
- Round 1: Egan (club debut)
- Round 1: Gorman (AFLW debut)
- Round 1: J. Kelly (AFLW debut)
- Round 2: Douglas (AFLW debut)
- Round 4: Waye (AFLW debut)
- Round 8: Tentye (AFLW debut)
- Round 9: Stewart (AFLW debut)

Games milestones

- Round 2: N. Kelly (50 club games)
- Round 2: Munyard (50 games)
- Round 4: Goodwin (50 games)
- Round 4: Charlton (75 games)
- Round 5: S. Allan (100 games)
- Round 5: Gould (75 games)
- Round 5: N. Kelly (75 games)
- Round 5: Munyard (50 club games)
- Round 6: J. Allan (50 club games)
- Round 8: Newman (75 games)
- Round 9: Egan (75 games)

=== AFLW Awards & Nominations ===
2026 AFL Women's All-Australian team

- 44-player squad: Biddell

22under22 team

- Extended squad: Bown, Douglas, Goodwin

== Reserves squad ==
Adelaide Football Club · SANFL personnel
Development squad		Coaching staff
2 Ned Atkinson; 4 Joseph Haines; 12 Jay Boyle; 14 Hugh Haysman; 16 Cameron Taheny; 37 Blake Drury; 47 James Richards; 45 Kieran Strachan (c); 46 Tom Bell; 49 Harry Boyle; 50 Darcy Clifford	50 William Crane; 51 Jay O'Leary; 53 Austin McDonald; 54 Tate Coleman; 55 Stephen Tahana; 55 Jaxon Bennett; 56 Saxon Evans; 57 Reuben Hill; 59 Lachlan Thomas; 60 Andrew McPherson	Head coach: Matthew Wright; Assistant coaches: Michael Godden (head of development); Andrew McPherson; Matthew Panos; Chelsea Randall; Legend: (c) Captain(s); (vc) Vice-captain(s); (i) Inactive; Updated: 5 November 2026; Source(s): Players, Coaches

== Reserves SANFL season ==
=== Pre-season matches ===
Adelaide's 2026 practice match fixtures
Date and local time	Opponent	Scores			Venue	Ref.
Date and local time	Opponent	Home	Away	Result	Venue	Ref.
Friday, 20 February (3:00 pm)	Port Adelaide	10.13 (73)	5.3 (33)	Lost by 40 points	Alberton Oval	
Friday, 27 February (6:15 pm)	Woodville-West Torrens	9.8 (62)	13.11 (89)	Lost by 27 points	Football Park	
Saturday, 14 March (3:20 pm)	Central District	14.13 (97)	10.11 (71)	Lost by 26 points	Elizabeth Oval	
Saturday, 21 March (2:10 pm)	South Adelaide	8.16 (64)	13.6 (84)	Won by 20 points	Noarlunga Oval	

=== Regular season ===
SANFL fixture Crowd numbers

Adelaide's 2026 SANFL season fixture
Round	Date and local time	Opponent	Home	Away	Result	Venue	Attendance	Ladder position	Ref.
Round	Date and local time	Opponent	Scores			Venue	Attendance	Ladder position	Ref.
1	Saturday, 28 March (2:10 pm)	West Adelaide	11.13 (79)	11.6 (72)	Lost by 7 points	Richmond Oval	1,151	8th ▼	
2	Thursday, 2 April (7:40 pm)	Woodville-West Torrens	12.12 (84)	10.7 (67)	Lost by 17 points	Woodville Oval	—N/a	9th ▼	
3	Saturday, 18 April (2:10 pm)	Central District	11.8 (74)	12.11 (83)	Won by 9 points	Elizabeth Oval	1,355	7th ▲	
4	Saturday, 25 April (2:10 pm)	North Adelaide	9.6 (60)	10.13 (73)	Won by 13 points	Prospect Oval	2,588	5th ▲	
5	Friday, 1 May (4:30 pm)	Port Adelaide	15.8 (98)	18.10 (118)	Lost by 20 points	Adelaide Oval	—N/a	7th ▼	
6	Saturday, 9 May (2:10 pm)	Sturt	18.9 (117)	10.9 (69)	Lost by 48 points	Unley Oval	2,438	9th ▼	
7	Saturday, 23 May (2:10 pm)	Glenelg	10.14 (74)	12.9 (81)	Won by 7 points	Glenelg Oval	4,128	6th ▲	
8	Bye							6th	Bye
9	Saturday, 6 June (2:10 pm)	South Adelaide	19.6 (66)	17.8 (110)	Won by 44 points	Noarlunga Oval	2,139	5th ▲	
10	Saturday, 6 June (2:10 pm)	North Adelaide	12.8 (80)	12.7 (79)	Lost by 1 point	Prospect Oval	1,262	6th ▼	
11	Sunday, 21 June (2:10 pm)	Norwood	19.7 (121)	7.13 (55)	Lost by 61 points	Norwood Oval	2,422	6th	
12	Saturday, 27 June (3:10 pm)	Port Adelaide	12.5 (77)	19.15 (129)	Won by 52 points	Adelaide Oval	—N/a	6th	
13	Saturday, 4 July (1:10 pm)	Central District	8.8 (56)	16.10 (106)	Won by 50 points	Elizabeth Oval	1,194	5th ▲	
14	Sunday, 12 July (2:10 pm)	Glenelg	8.13 (61)	8.10 (58)	Lost by 3 points	Glenelg Oval	2,479	5th	
15	Saturday, 18 July (2:10 pm)	West Adelaide	12.11 (83)	13.16 (94)	Won by 11 points	Richmond Oval	1,006	5th	
16	Saturday, 1 August (2:10 pm)	South Adelaide	16.7 (103)	13.7 (85)	Lost by 18 points	Noarlunga Oval	1,240	5th	
17	Sunday, 9 August (1:10 pm)	Woodville-West Torrens	11.11 (77)	10.10 (70)	Lost by 7 points	Woodville Oval	—N/a	6th ▼	
18	Friday, 14 August (7:40 pm)	Norwood	16.10 (106)	7.10 (52)	Lost by 54 points	Norwood Oval	1,817	6th	
19	Saturday, 22 August (2:30 pm)	Sturt	16.9 (105)	11.11 (77)	Lost by 28 points	Unley Oval	3,819	7th ▼	

=== Ladder ===
Pos	Team	Pld	W	L	D	PF	PA	PP	Pts	Qualification
1	Norwood (P)	18	15	3	0	1668	968	63.28	30	Finals series
2	Glenelg	18	15	3	0	1420	1076	56.89	30	Finals series
3	Sturt	18	13	5	0	1631	1200	57.61	26	Finals series
4	Woodville-West Torrens	18	10	8	0	1319	1245	51.44	20	Finals series
5	West Adelaide	18	8	9	1	1263	1276	49.74	17	Finals series
6	South Adelaide	18	8	10	0	1270	1479	46.20	16	
7	Adelaide (R)	18	7	11	0	1458	1541	48.62	14	
8	Central District	18	5	12	1	1213	1354	47.25	11	
9	North Adelaide	18	5	13	0	1101	1530	41.85	10	
10	Port Adelaide (R)	18	3	15	0	1124	1798	38.47	6	

Source: sanfl.com.au
Rules for classification: 1) points; 2) percentage; 3) number of points for.
(P) Premiers

== Reserves summary ==
=== Milestones ===
- Round 6: J. Boyle (100 games)

=== SANFL Awards & Nominations ===
- SANFL Team of the Year: Drury, O'Brien
