= 2023 Adelaide Football Club season =

Adelaide Crows AFL season

Adelaide Football Club
2023 season
- Coach: Matthew Nicks
- Captain: Jordan Dawson
- Home ground: Adelaide Oval
- Home & Away: 10th (11-12-0)
- Finals: DNQ
- Leading goalkicker: Taylor Walker (72 goals)
- Highest home attendance: 50,023 (round 20)
- Lowest home attendance: 33,118 (round 11)
- Average home attendance: 38,647

The 2023 Adelaide Football Club season was the club's 33rd season of senior competition in the Australian Football League (AFL). This is the Crows' first season captained by Jordan Dawson and their 4th year coached by Matthew Nicks. Adelaide finished 10th with 11 wins and 12 losses, therefore failing to qualify for the finals for a sixth consecutive season.

== Overview ==
Adelaide's 2023 season overview
Captain	Coach	Home ground	W-L-D	Ladder	Finals	Best and fairest	Leading goalkicker
Jordan Dawson	Matthew Nicks	Adelaide Oval	11-12-0	10th	DNQ	Jordan Dawson	Taylor Walker (76)

=== Kits ===
Manufacturer: O'Neills
Sponsors: Toyota, Hungry Jack's, Crypto.com

Home	Clash	Gather Round

== Squad ==
Players are listed by guernsey number, and 2023 statistics are for AFL regular season and finals series matches during the 2023 AFL season only. Career statistics include a player's complete AFL career, which, as a result, means that a player's debut and part or whole of their career statistics may be for another club. Statistics are correct as of round 23 of the 2023 season (27 August 2023) and are taken from AFL Tables.

No.	Name	AFL debut	Games (2023)	Goals (2023)	Games (AFC)	Goals (AFC)	Games (AFL career)	Goals (AFL career)
1	Chayce Jones	2019	18	7	76	17	76	17
**2**	**Ben Keays**	**2016 (Brisbane)**	**23**	**22**	**83**	**47**	**113**	**58**
3	Sam Berry	2021	4	0	39	8	39	8
4	Lachlan Murphy	2018	22	12	98	68	98	68
5	Matt Crouch	2014	7	2	143	30	143	30
6	Jackson Hately	2019 (GWS)	1	0	15	2	28	4
7	Riley Thilthorpe	2021	21	18	46	44	46	44
8	Josh Rachele	2022	21	23	34	40	34	40
9	Rory Sloane	2009	22	6	255	136	255	136
10	Luke Pedlar	2021	21	25	26	26	26	26
11	Paul Seedsman	2012 (Collingwood)	0	0	83	49	83	49
**12**	**Jordan Dawson (c)**	**2017 (Sydney)**	**23**	**6**	**45**	**16**	**109**	**50**
13	Taylor Walker	2009	22	76	260	612	260	612
14	Jake Soligo	2022	21	10	37	16	37	16
15	Brayden Cook	2021	1	0	12	3	12	3
16	Max Michalanney	2023	22	0	22	0	22	0
17	Will Hamill	2020	0	0	38	1	38	1
19	Zac Taylor	—	0	0	0	0	0	0
20	Mitch Hinge	2019 (Brisbane)	22	1	40	4	43	5
21	Tyler Brown	2020 (Collingwood)	1	0	1	0	28	4
22	Izak Rankine	2020 (Gold Coast)	20	36	20	36	68	93
23	Shane McAdam	2020	7	12	50	72	50	72
24	Josh Worrell	2021	12	0	17	0	17	0
25	Ned McHenry	2020	11	4	60	28	60	28
26	Harry Schoenberg	2020	11	2	57	19	57	19
27	Luke Nankervis	2023	4	0	4	0	4	0
28	Nick Murray	2021	17	0	46	1	46	1
29	Rory Laird	2013	22	3	224	28	224	28
30	Wayne Milera	2016	22	3	96	29	96	29
31	Billy Dowling	—	0	0	0	0	0	0
32	Darcy Forgarty	2018	21	34	79	117	79	117
33	Brodie Smith	2011	22	4	247	71	247	71
34	Elliott Himmelberg	2018	3	1	41	41	41	41
35	James Borlase	2023	4	0	4	0	4	0
36	Andrew McPherson	2020	0	0	28	0	28	0
37	Patrick Parnell	2022	5	0	16	0	16	0
38	Lachlan Sholl	2020	16	4	54	13	54	13
39	Tom Doedee	2018	11	0	82	3	82	3
40	Hugh Bond	—	0	0	0	0	0	0
41	Jordan Butts	2020	17	0	60	0	60	0
42	Tariek Newchurch	—	0	0	0	0	0	0
**43**	**Reilly O'Brien**	**2016**	**23**	**4**	**100**	**12**	**100**	**12**
44	Lachlan Gollant	2021	4	4	12	12	12	12
45	Kieran Strachan	2020	0	0	5	0	5	0
48	Mark Keane	2020 (Collingwood)	5	0	10	0	10	0

Bold = Played every game in 2023

=== Squad changes ===
==== In ====
No.	Name	Position	Previous club	via
22	(South Australia) Izak Rankine	Medium Forward	Gold Coast	trade
16	(South Australia) Max Michalanney	Defender	Norwood	AFL national draft, first round (pick No. 17)
31	(South Australia) Billy Dowling	Midfielder	North Adelaide U18	AFL national draft, third round (pick No. 43)
40	(Victoria (state)) Hugh Bond	Midfielder	GWV U18	AFL national draft, third round (pick No. 50)
11	(Victoria (state)) Paul Seedsman	Midfielder	Adelaide	AFL rookie draft, second round (pick No. 21)
36	(Victoria (state)) Andrew McPherson	Defender	Adelaide	AFL rookie draft, first round (pick No. 5)
21	(Victoria (state)) Tyler Brown	Midfielder	Collingwood	Pre-season supplemental selection
48	(Republic of Ireland) Mark Keane	Defender	Collingwood	Pre-season supplemental selection

==== Out ====
No.	Name	Position	New Club	via
22	(Western Australia) Billy Frampton	Ruck	Collingwood	trade
16	(South Australia) Luke Brown	Defender	-	retirement
31	(South Australia) James Rowe	Forward	Woodville-West Torrens	delisted
40	(New South Wales) Ben Davis	Forward	North Melbourne (VFL)	delisted
46	(South Australia) Brett Turner	Midfielder	Glenelg	delisted
11	(Victoria (state)) Paul Seedsman	Midfielder	-	delisted
36	(Victoria (state)) Andrew McPherson	Defender	-	delisted

== Season ==
=== Pre-season matches ===
Adelaide's 2023 practice match and AAMI Community Series fixtures
Date and local time	Opponent	Scores			Venue	Ref
Date and local time	Opponent	Home	Away	Result	Venue	Ref
Friday, 24 February (4:20 pm)	Fremantle	14.9 (93)	25.15 (165)	Won by 72 points	Victor George Kailis Oval [A]	
Friday, 3 March (7:40 pm)	West Coast	7.10 (52)	17.9 (111)	Won by 59 points	Mineral Resources Park [A]	

=== Regular season ===
Adelaide's 2023 AFL season fixture
Round	Date and local time	Opponent	Home	Away	Result	Venue	Attendance	Ladder position	Ref
Round	Date and local time	Opponent	Scores			Venue	Attendance	Ladder position	Ref
1	Saturday, 19 March (1:10 pm)	Greater Western Sydney	15.16.106	12.18.90	Lost by 16 points	Giants Stadium [A]	8,169	12th	
2	Saturday, 19 March (1:10 pm)	Richmond	10.16.76	17.6.108	Lost by 32 points	Adelaide Oval [H]	38,492	15th ▼	
3	Saturday, 1 April (7:30 pm)	Port Adelaide	13.8.86	18.9.117	Won by 31 points	Adelaide Oval [A]	48,962	11th ▲	
4	Saturday, 8 April (1:45 pm)	Fremantle	17.9.111	10.12.72	Won by 39 points	Adelaide Oval [H]	33,725	7th ▲	
5	Thursday, 13 April (7:40 pm)	Carlton	18.10.118	9.8.62	Won by 56 points	Adelaide Oval [H]	47,395	7th	
6	Sunday, 23 April (1:10 pm)	Hawthorn	11.10.76	11.13.79	Won by 3 points	UTAS Stadium [A]	10,119	5th ▲	
7	Sunday, 30 April (4:40 pm)	Collingwood	7.16.58	8.11.59	Lost by 1 point	Adelaide Oval [H]	43,942	8th ▼	
8	Saturday, 6 May (2:10 pm)	Geelong	14.14.98	11.6.72	Lost by 26 points	GMHBA Stadium [A]	21,415	10th ▼	
9	Sunday, 14 May (1:10 pm)	St Kilda	19.7.121	10.9.69	Won by 52 points	Adelaide Oval [H]	33,805	8th ▲	
10	Saturday, 20 May (2:10 pm)	Western Bulldogs	11.19.85	5.10.40	Lost by 45 points	Mars Stadium [A]	10,114	8th	
11	Sunday, 28 May (4:40 pm)	Brisbane Lions	14.11.95	10.18.78	Won by 17 points	Adelaide Oval [H]	33,188	7th ▲	
12	Saturday, 3 June (7:30 pm)	Gold Coast	16.16.112	13.9.87	Lost by 25 points	TIO Stadium [A]	10,772	9th ▼	
13	Saturday, 10 June (4:35 pm)	West Coast	27.12.174	8.4.52	Won by 122 points	Adelaide Oval [H]	39,450	7th ▲	
14	Bye							8th ▼	Bye
15	Sunday, 25 June (1:10 pm)	Collingwood	12.10.82	11.14.80	Lost by 2 points	MCG [A]	65,930	8th	
16	Saturday, 1 July (1:45 pm)	North Melbourne	21.12.138	11.6.72	Won by 66 points	Adelaide Oval [H]	35,226	7th ▲	
17	Sunday, 9 July (3:20 pm)	Essendon	17.13.115	15.7.97	Lost by 18 points	Marvel Stadium [A]	39,606	9th ▼	
18	Saturday, 15 July (7:40 pm)	Greater Western Sydney	8.9.57	10.11.71	Lost by 14 points	Adelaide Oval [H]	36.674	12th ▼	
19	Sunday, 23 July (3:20 pm)	Melbourne	14.13.97	13.15.93	Lost by 4 points	MCG [A]	33,122	13th ▼	
20	Saturday, 29 July (7:40 pm)	Port Adelaide	16.16.112	9.11.65	Won by 47 points	Adelaide Oval [H]	50,023	12th ▲	
21	Saturday, 5 August (2:10 pm)	Gold Coast	13.11.89	9.7.61	Won by 28 points	Adelaide Oval [H]	35,777	11th ▲	
22	Saturday, 12 August (4:35 pm)	Brisbane Lions	15.9.99	13.15.93	Lost by 6 points	The Gabba [A]	30,107	12th ▼	
23	Saturday, 19 August (7:40 pm)	Sydney	10.13.73	11.8.74	Lost by 1 point	Adelaide Oval [H]	44,817	13th ▼	
24	Saturday, 26 August (8:10 pm)	West Coast	12.6.78	17.21.123	Won by 45 points	Optus Stadium [A]	47,027	10th ▲	

=== Ladder ===
Pos	Team	Pld	W	L	D	PF	PA	PP	Pts	Qualification
1	Collingwood (P)	23	18	5	0	2142	1687	127.0	72	Finals series
2	Brisbane Lions	23	17	6	0	2180	1771	123.1	68	Finals series
3	Port Adelaide	23	17	6	0	2149	1906	112.7	68	Finals series
4	Melbourne	23	16	7	0	2079	1660	125.2	64	Finals series
5	Carlton	23	13	9	1	1922	1697	113.3	54	Finals series
6	St Kilda	23	13	10	0	1775	1647	107.8	52	Finals series
7	Greater Western Sydney	23	13	10	0	2018	1885	107.1	52	Finals series
8	Sydney	23	12	10	1	2050	1863	110.0	50	Finals series
9	Western Bulldogs	23	12	11	0	1919	1766	108.7	48	
10	Adelaide	23	11	12	0	2193	1877	116.8	44	
11	Essendon	23	11	12	0	1838	2050	89.7	44	
12	Geelong	23	10	12	1	2088	1855	112.6	42	
13	Richmond	23	10	12	1	1856	1983	93.6	42	
14	Fremantle	23	10	13	0	1835	1898	96.7	40	
15	Gold Coast	23	9	14	0	1839	2006	91.7	36	
16	Hawthorn	23	7	16	0	1686	2101	80.2	28	
17	North Melbourne	23	3	20	0	1657	2318	71.5	12	
18	West Coast	23	3	20	0	1418	2674	53.0	12	

Source: afl.com.au
Rules for classification: 1) points; 2) percentage; 3) number of points for
(P) Premiers

=== Awards and milestones ===
==== AFL Awards ====
- 2023 All-Australian Team - Taylor Walker (Half Forward)
- 2023 All-Australian Team - Jordan Dawson (Interchange)
- 2023 22under22 selection - Josh Rachele (Forward Pocket)

==== AFL Award nominations ====
- AFLPA MVP Nominees – Taylor Walker, Jordan Dawson, Rory Laird
- AFLPA Best first-year player Nominee – Max Michalanney
- AFLPA Best captain Nominee – Jordan Dawson
- 2023 AFL Rising Star Nomination – Max Michalanney (Round 5)
- 2023 AFL Rising Star Nomination – Luke Pedlar (Round 16)
- 2023 22under22 44 man squad – Nick Murrary
- 2023 22under22 44 man squad – Luke Pedlar
- 2023 22under22 44 man squad – Riley Thilthorpe

==== Milestones ====
- Round 1 - Max Michalanney (AFL Debut)
- Round 1 - Tyler Brown (Adelaide Debut)
- Round 1 - Izak Rankine (Adelaide Debut)
- Round 2 - Izak Rankine (50 AFL Games)
- Round 4 - Ned McHenry (50 Games)
- Round 7 - Harry Schoenberg (50 Games)
- Round 10 - Ben Keays (100 AFL Games)
- Round 12 - Darcy Forgarty (100 Goals)
- Round 13 - Taylor Walker (250 Games)
- Round 13 - Lachlan Sholl (50 Games)
- Round 15 - Jordan Dawson (100 AFL Games)
- Round 18 - Rory Sloane (250 Games)
- Round 19 - Luke Nankervis (AFL Debut)
- Round 21 - James Borlase (AFL Debut)
- Round 22 - Taylor Walker (600 Goals)
- Round 23 - Shane McAdam (50 Games)
- Round 24 - Reilly O'Brien (100 Games)
