= Charlie Edwards (Australian footballer) =

Australian rules footballer (born 2005)

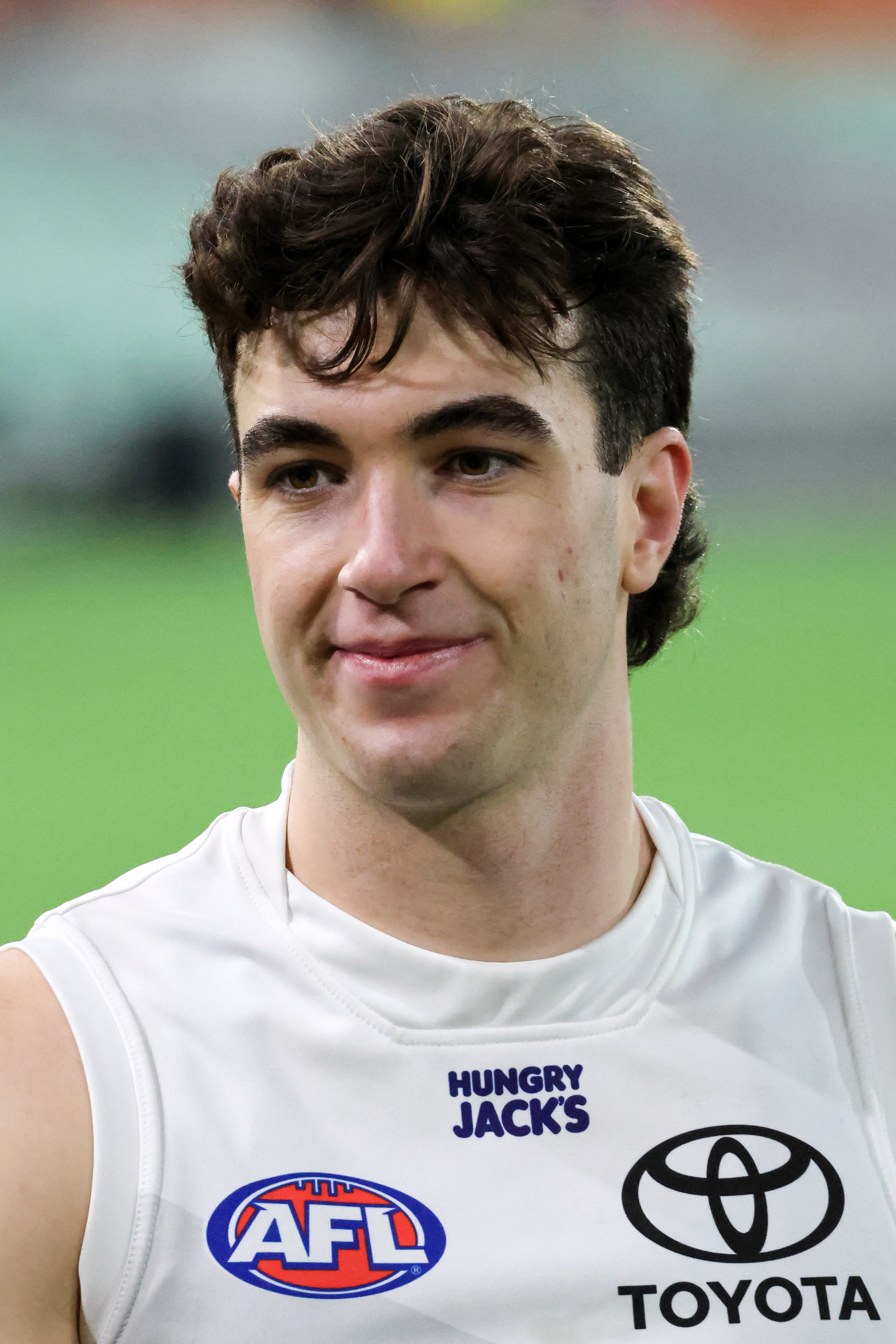
- Edwards in 2026

Personal information
- Full name: Charlie Edwards
- Nickname: Cheddar
- Born: 18 May 2005 (age 21); Victoria, Australia
- Original teams: Sandringham Dragons (Talent League); Melbourne Grammar (APS); Sandhurst (BFNL)
- Draft: No. 21, 2023 AFL draft
- Debut: Round 6, 2026, Adelaide vs. St Kilda, at Adelaide Oval
- Height: 191 cm (6 ft 3 in)
- Weight: 85 kg (187 lb)
- Position: Midfielder / defender

Club information
- Current club: Adelaide
- Number: 11

Playing career^{1}
Years	Club	Games (Goals)
2024–	Adelaide	2 (0)
- ^{1} Playing statistics correct to the end of round 22, 2026.

Charlie Edwards is a professional Australian rules footballer who was selected by the Adelaide Football Club at pick number 21 in the 2023 AFL draft.

== Early life ==
At amateur level, Edwards played junior football for Sandhurst in the Bendigo Football League before boarding at Melbourne Grammar School, where he was the vice-captain of both Football and Cricket, as well as the Captain of Perry House in his final year.

Edwards played for the Sandringham Dragons in the Talent League. Playing 12 games across the 2023 season, Edwards played as a midfielder in the 2023 Talent League Grand Final against Eastern Ranges, despite starting the season as a defender. He became a premiership player for the under-18 team, scoring a goal in the Final. Edwards' prolific finals series showcased his versatility as a young player, succeeding as a forward, defender, and midfielder.

Edwards, a bolter in the 2023 national draft, was taken by the Adelaide Crows at pick 21 in the first round.

== AFL career ==
Edwards wears the guernsey number 11, inheriting the locker number from the retiring Paul Seedsman. Playing as an inside midfielder for Adelaide in the South Australian National Football League (SANFL) in 2024, Edwards did not make his AFL debut in his first senior year. Alongside fellow draftee Oscar Ryan, Edwards extended his existing contract until the end of 2026.

Edwards continued to grow in the SANFL, taking up a positional role change as a half-back flanker in the 2025 season. The change was pivotal for the young Crow, who "embraced the chance to evolve". The successful move meant that he played all 20 of the Crows' SANFL games in 2025, averaging 19.5 disposals. He took extra steps early in 2026, collecting 17 disposals and five clearances in an AFL practice match against Fremantle and averaging 24.5 disposals in his first two SANFL games of the 2026 season.

He made his AFL debut in round 6 of the 2026 season, replacing midfielders Jordan Dawson and Jake Soligo against St Kilda.

== Personal life ==
Edwards, who is originally from Victoria, is studying a law and commerce degree. In October 2025, he took the challenge of the Kokoda Track in Papua New Guinea, raising money for the Adelaide Crows Foundation.

His girlfriend, Pippa, studies at the Australian National University in Canberra.

== Statistics ==
Updated to the end of round 22, 2026.

Legend
G	Goals	K	Kicks	D	Disposals	T	Tackles
B	Behinds	H	Handballs	M	Marks

Season	Team	No.	Games	Totals							Averages (per game)							Votes
Season	Team	No.	Games	G	B	K	H	D	M	T	G	B	K	H	D	M	T	Votes
2024	Adelaide	11	0	—	—	—	—	—	—	—	—	—	—	—	—	—	—	0
2025	Adelaide	11	0	—	—	—	—	—	—	—	—	—	—	—	—	—	—	0
2026	Adelaide	11	2	0	1	20	10	30	6	4	0.0	0.5	10.0	5.0	15.0	3.0	2.0	0
Career			2	0	1	20	10	30	6	4	0.0	0.5	10.0	5.0	15.0	3.0	2.0	0
