= Oscar Ryan =

Australian rules footballer (born 2005)

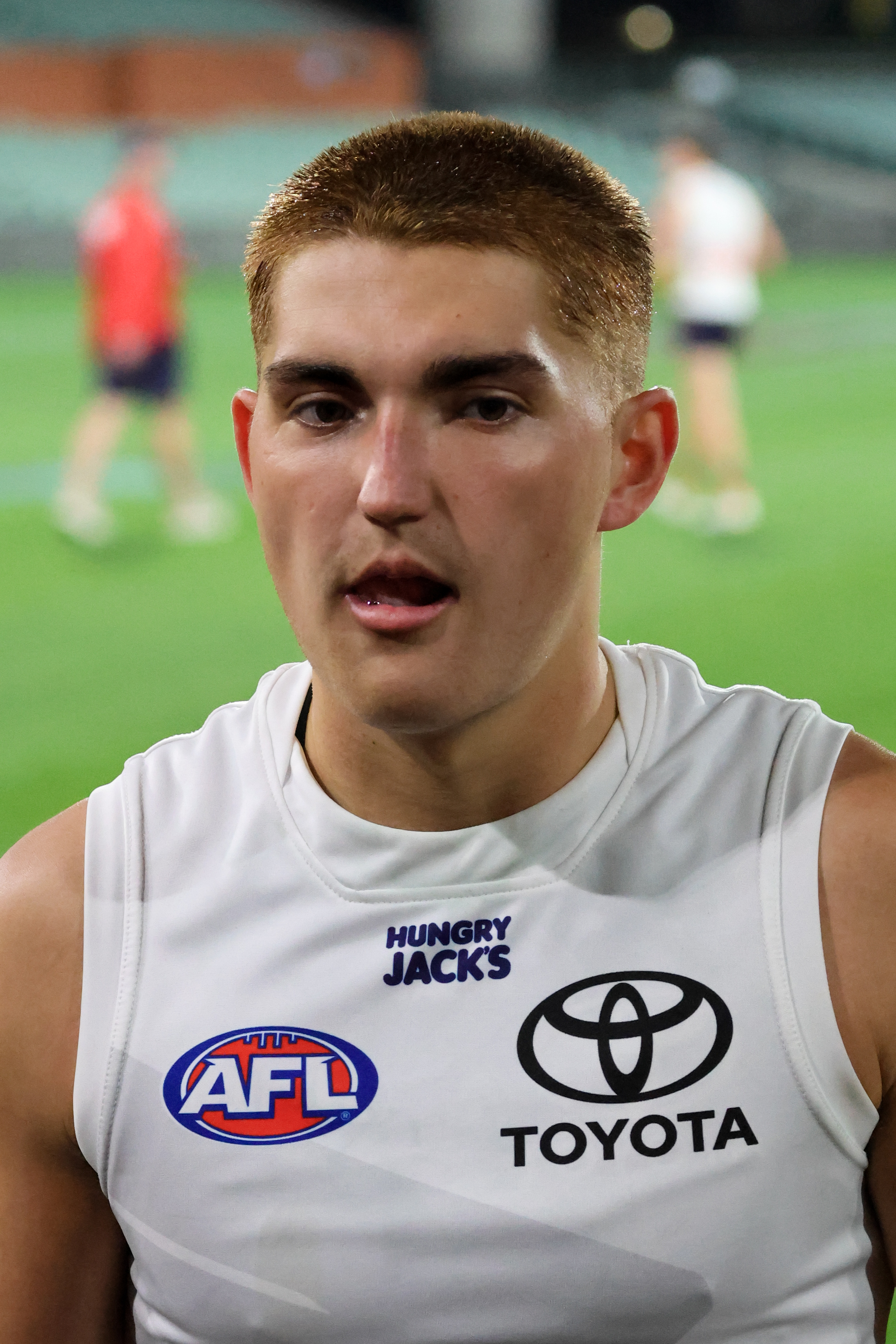
- Ryan in 2026

Personal information
- Full name: Oscar Ryan
- Born: 15 May 2005 (age 21); Victoria, Australia
- Original teams: Murray Bushrangers (Talent League); Shepparton United (Goulburn Valley League)
- Draft: No. 27, 2023 national draft
- Debut: Round 21, 2026, Adelaide vs. Essendon, at Docklands Stadium
- Height: 187 cm (6 ft 2 in)
- Weight: 77 kg (170 lb)
- Position: Defender

Club information
- Current club: Adelaide
- Number: 22

Playing career^{1}
Years	Club	Games (Goals)
2024–	Adelaide	2 (1)
- ^{1} Playing statistics correct to the end of round 22, 2026.

Oscar Ryan (born 15 May 2005) is an Australian rules footballer who plays for the Adelaide Football Club in the Australian Football League (AFL).

== Early life ==
Ryan previously played for the Shepparton United Football Club in the Goulburn Valley Football Netball League and the Murray Bushrangers in the Talent League. He later represented Vic Country in the AFL U18 National Championships in 2023. Ryan was selected with the 27th pick in the 2023 national draft, Adelaide's third pick of the draft.

== AFL career ==
Despite a late push of strong form in the South Australian National Football League (SANFL) for Adelaide, Ryan did not play an AFL game in his first senior season. He extended his existing contract until the end of 2026 alongside fellow draftee Charlie Edwards. Working under fellow running defender Wayne Milera, Ryan emerged as an early chance to debut in round 1 during the 2025 pre-season.

Made to bide his time, Ryan finally made his debut in round 21 of the 2026 AFL season alongside Archie Ludowyke, and replaced the injured Wayne Milera on half-back. He kicked a goal from his 19 disposals on debut in the win against Essendon, and credited the mentorship of Milera, Rory Laird, and the retired Brodie Smith for his stand-out performance.

== Statistics ==
Updated to the end of round 22, 2026.

Legend
G	Goals	K	Kicks	D	Disposals	T	Tackles
B	Behinds	H	Handballs	M	Marks

Season	Team	No.	Games	Totals							Averages (per game)							Votes
Season	Team	No.	Games	G	B	K	H	D	M	T	G	B	K	H	D	M	T	Votes
2026	Adelaide	22	2	1	0	21	11	32	8	6	0.5	0.0	10.5	5.5	16.0	4.0	3.0	0
Career			2	1	0	21	11	32	8	6	0.5	0.0	10.5	5.5	16.0	4.0	3.0	0
