= Josh Rachele =

Australian rules footballer (born 2003)

- Rachele in 2026

Personal information
- Full name: Joshua Jason Rachele
- Nicknames: Rash, Shelley, J-Rach
- Born: 11 April 2003 (age 23); Shepparton, Victoria, Australia
- Original teams: Murray Bushrangers (Talent League); Caulfield Grammar (APS); Shepparton Swans (GVFL)
- Draft: No. 6, 2021 AFL draft
- Debut: Round 1, 2022, Adelaide vs. Fremantle, at Adelaide Oval
- Height: 180 cm (5 ft 11 in)
- Weight: 84 kg (185 lb)
- Position: Forward

Club information
- Current club: Adelaide
- Number: 8

Playing career^{1}
Years	Club	Games (Goals)
2022–	Adelaide	95 (139)
- ^{1} Playing statistics correct to the end of semi final, 2026.

Career highlights
- Adelaide leading goalkicker: 2026; 3x 22under22 team: 2023, 2024, 2025; Rising Star nomination: 2022

Joshua Jason Rachele (/rəˈʃɛli/ rə-SHELL-ee; born 11 April 2003) is a professional Australian rules footballer who plays for the Adelaide Crows in the Australian Football League (AFL).

He was selected by the Adelaide Crows with their first pick, the sixth overall, in the 2021 AFL draft. He previously played for the Murray Bushrangers in the NAB League and the Shepparton Swans Football Club in the Goulburn Valley League. He was educated at Notre Dame College, Shepparton and Caulfield Grammar School.

Rachele had an opportunity to play soccer professionally but chose Australian rules football instead. He was part of the academy for Melbourne City FC and the under-17s Australian team.

He has Italian and Greek heritage.

== AFL career ==
Rachele made an immediate impact at the Crows, kicking five goals on debut against Fremantle in the opening round of the 2022 AFL season. In Round 4, Rachele received a Rising Star nomination in Adelaide's game against Essendon, in which Rachele took 9 marks, kicked 3 goals, and collected 19 disposals.

Rachele became known for his goal celebrations imitating the likes of Tim Cahill, Kylian Mbappé and later Kenan Yıldız. On June 21, 2023, Rachele signed a contract extension which would keep him at the club until 2029. At the time, this was the longest current-standing contract of any player at Adelaide, equal with fellow draftee Jake Soligo.

Rachele faced a lot of criticism from the media in the first half of 2024, particularly for a few missed opportunities against Essendon in round 6. The small forward redeemed himself against Essendon in round 19 when one of his three goals was a last-minute match-winner. His celebration, during which he ran to the crowd and hugged a fan, mimicked James Hird's celebration 20 years prior. Rachele was the center of controversy prior to the Showdown against Port Adelaide in round 23 when he jokingly used an offensive stereotype of Power fans on FIVEaa. Following the Showdown loss, Rachele received public criticism in the media for the comments, including Kane Cornes and teammate Rory Laird. In the following week, Rachele was named in the 22 Under 22 team for the second time and was omitted for the final game of the year. Despite the late-season omission, Rachele kicked a career-best 30 goals during the season, which was the third highest of any Crow.

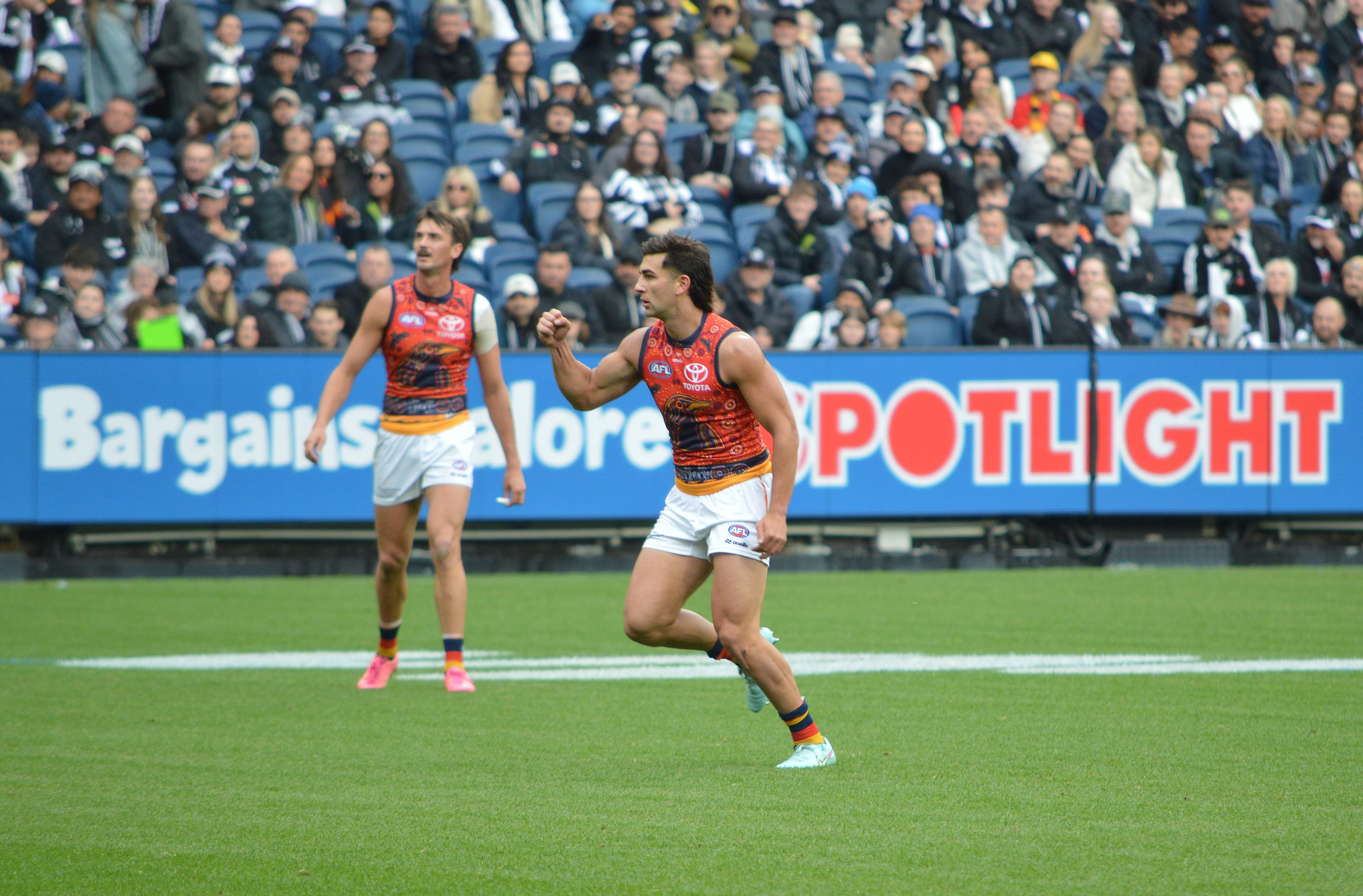
Rachele celebrates a goal against Collingwood in 2025

Following his controversial end to 2024, Rachele did not miss a beat in the 2025 pre-season, receiving public praise from coach Matthew Nicks and teammate Ben Keays. Rachele started the season in good form, kicking six goals and collecting 37 disposals from his first two games. In round 3, he collided with North Melbourne's Tristan Xerri and fractured three ribs, leaving the ground at quarter time and sitting on the sidelines in the following few weeks. Later in 2025, Rachele suffered a knee injury during a match against Melbourne. A few months later, he returned from injury to play in his first finals match against Hawthorn. He kicked two late goals in the loss.

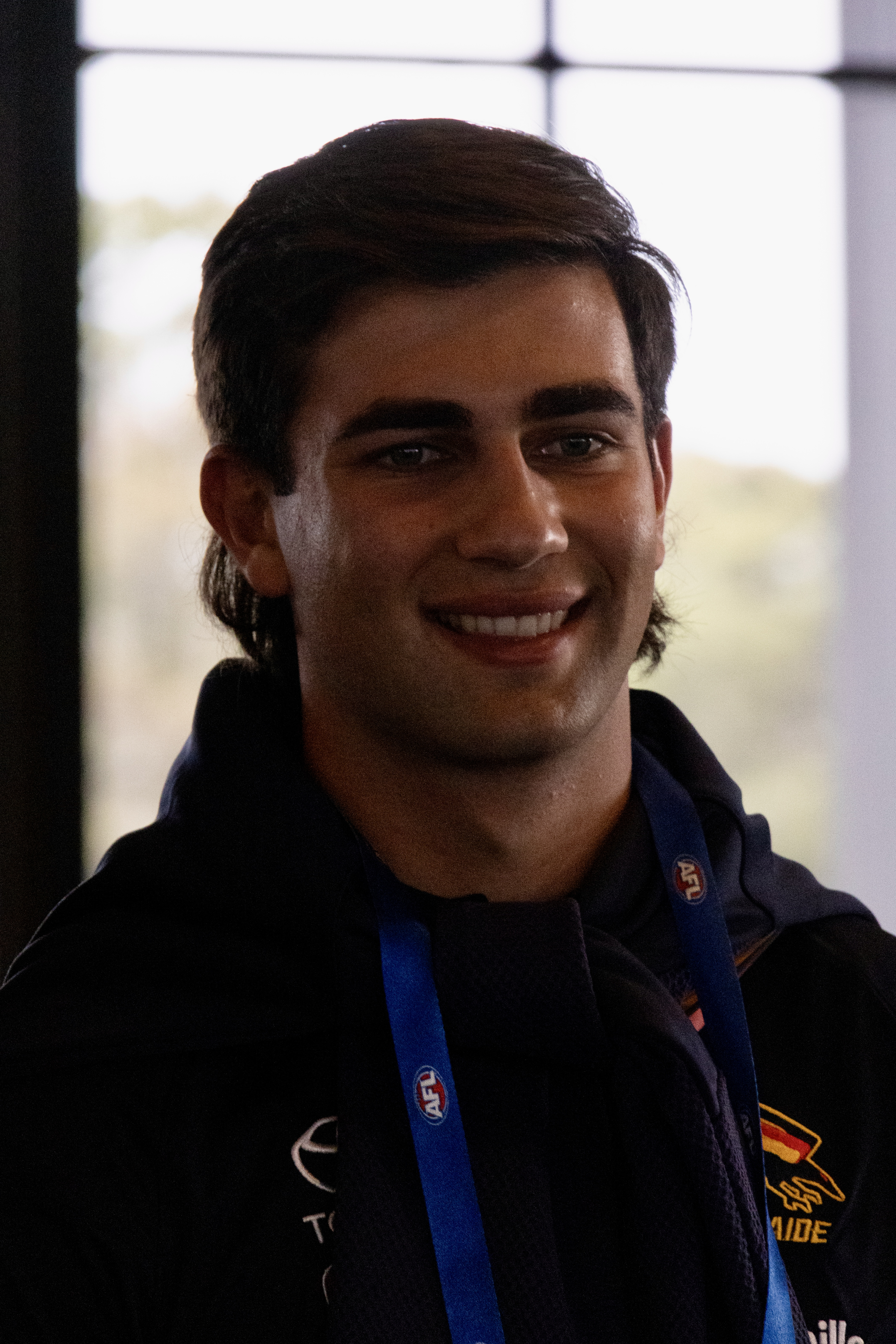
Rachele with Adelaide in 2025

Rachele began the 2026 season in career-best form, beginning to spend a majority of his time in the midfield, moving from approximately 10% midfield time to 68%. In the round 3 match against Geelong, Rachele collected a personal best 31 disposals, stepping up in the absence of captain Jordan Dawson. He improved again in round 5's Gather Round clash against Carlton, scoring four first-half goals from 26 total disposals and receiving a perfect ten coaches' votes. Rachele finished the home-and-away season with a career-best 23 appearances, and kicked three crucial goals in the elimination final win against the Western Bulldogs.

== Personal life ==
Since October 2022, Rachele has lived with fellow Victorians and current teammates Luke Nankervis and Jake Soligo. He has become a fan of the Adelaide 36ers in the NBL since his move to Adelaide. Rachele also has a close relationship with former Greater Western Sydney forward Cooper Hamilton, with whom he boarded with at Caulfield Grammar School.

Rachele's Italian and Greek heritage keep his family close knit. His parents are named Michelle and Jason, and he has two younger twin brothers. Jason Rachele works on the family-owned orchard in Shepparton.

== Statistics ==
Updated to the end of 2026.

Legend
G	Goals	K	Kicks	D	Disposals	T	Tackles
B	Behinds	H	Handballs	M	Marks

Season	Team	No.	Games	Totals							Averages (per game)							Votes
Season	Team	No.	Games	G	B	K	H	D	M	T	G	B	K	H	D	M	T	Votes
2022	Adelaide	8	13	17	11	93	53	146	36	24	1.3	0.8	7.2	4.1	11.2	2.8	1.8	1
2023	Adelaide	8	21	23	25	204	117	321	81	70	1.1	1.2	9.7	5.6	15.3	3.9	3.3	0
2024	Adelaide	8	22	30	17	202	109	311	79	51	1.4	0.8	9.2	5.0	14.1	3.6	2.3	0
2025	Adelaide	8	14	27	15	121	40	161	47	26	1.9	1.1	8.6	2.9	11.5	3.4	1.9	0
2026	Adelaide	8	25	42	21	266	125	391	79	57	1.7	0.8	10.6	5.0	15.6	3.2	2.3	8
Career			95	139	89	886	444	1330	322	228	1.5	0.9	9.3	4.7	14.0	3.4	2.4	9
