= Hugo Hall-Kahan =

Australian rules footballer (born 2003)

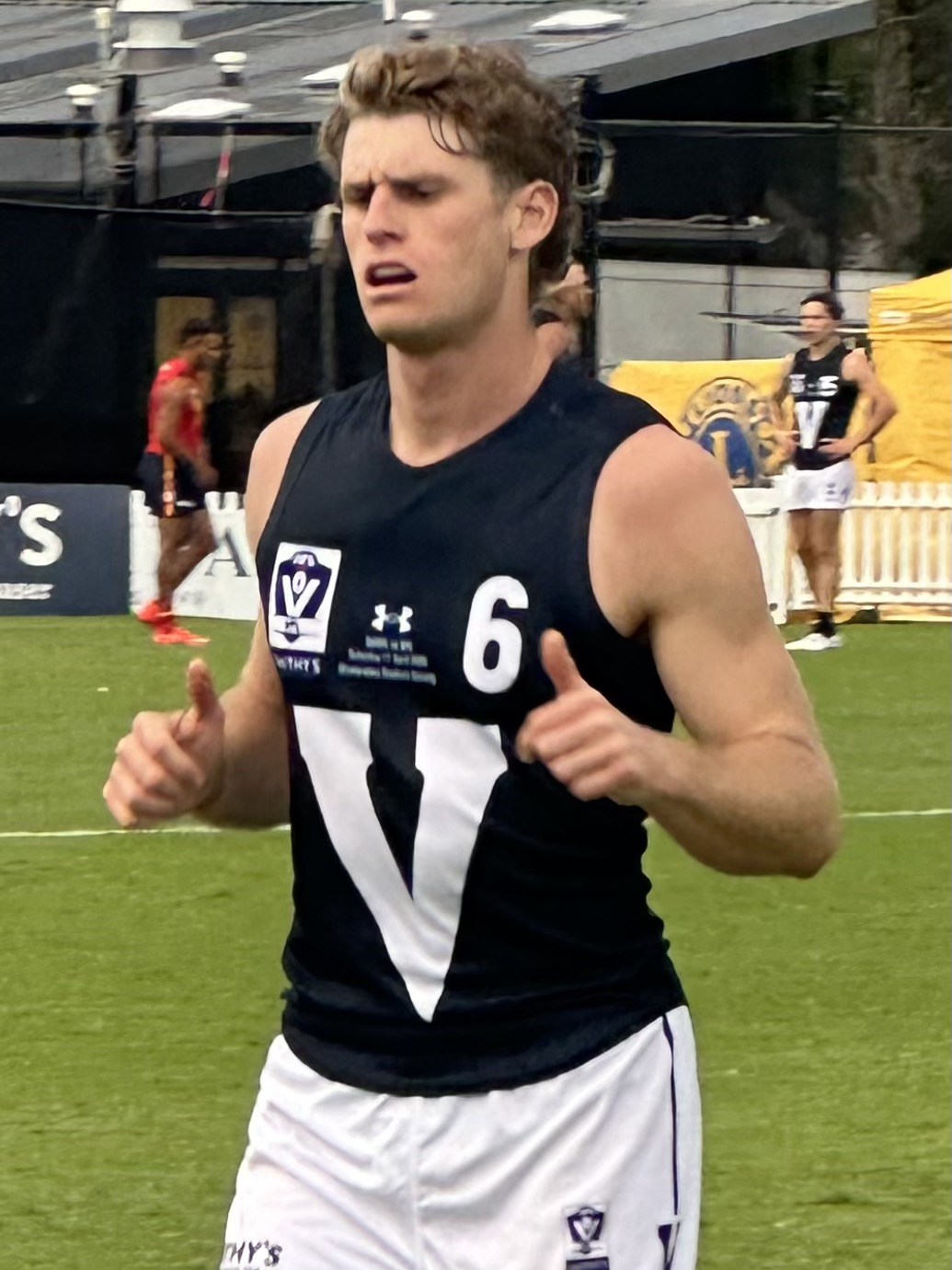
- Hall-Kahan representing the VFL in 2026

Personal information
- Born: 22 September 2003 (age 23); Victoria, Australia
- Original teams: Williamstown (VFL); Sandringham Dragons (Talent League); East Sandringham JFC (SMJFL)
- Draft: No. 11, 2022 mid-season rookie draft No. 10, 2026 mid-season rookie draft
- Debut: Round 13, 2026, Adelaide vs. Geelong, at Adelaide Oval
- Height: 188 cm (6 ft 2 in)
- Weight: 82 kg (181 lb)
- Position: Defender

Club information
- Current club: Adelaide
- Number: 1

Playing career^{1}
Years	Club	Games (Goals)
2022–2023	Sydney	0 (0)
2026–	Adelaide	9 (1)
- ^{1} Playing statistics correct to the end of round 22, 2026.

Hugo Hall-Kahan (born 22 September 2003) is a professional Australian rules footballer who plays for the Adelaide Football Club in the Australian Football League (AFL).

== Early life ==
Hall-Kahan was educated at Haileybury in Melbourne, Australia, where he struck a bond with future Adelaide Crows teammate Josh Worrell. He is the nephew of Melbourne Cup–winning trainer David Hall. He played his junior football at East Sandringham in the Southern Metro Junior Football League.

He played for the Sandringham Dragons in the Talent League prior to his AFL recruitment. He also played in the Young Guns representative side, but has noted that injuries in his junior career and the COVID-19 pandemic affected his football in the lead up to draft eligibility.

== AFL career ==
=== Sydney ===
Following an impressive start to the year with the Dragons, Hall-Kahan was drafted by the Sydney Swans through the 2022 mid-season rookie draft. He played 30 games for their reserves team in the Victorian Football League (VFL), kicking 29 goals. Following 18 months at the club, he was delisted by the Swans at the conclusion of the 2023 season.

=== VFL years ===
Hall-Kahan spent a year at the Sandringham Football Club, playing in the VFL during the 2024 season, before moving to Williamstown Football Club, where he played during the 2025 season and the first half of the 2026 season. Despite beginning his career as a forward, Hall-Kahan transitioned to the defence, where he averaged 27.7 disposals and six marks during his 2026 campaign with the Seagulls. He represented the VFL in the State Game match against the SANFL in April 2026 at Glenelg Oval.

=== Adelaide ===
Once again, Hall-Kahan was picked up by an AFL club through the 2026 mid-season rookie draft, this time selected by Adelaide. He became the second player to be drafted by two separate teams in mid-season rookie drafts, after Brynn Teakle. Only seven days after being drafted, Hall-Kahan was announced to be making his AFL debut in the round 13 clash against Geelong. He impressed on debut with 16 disposals, but he needed stitches on his nose after a collison with Toby Murray. He collected 23 disposals in each of the following weeks, and in round 21, he kicked his first career goal from a set shot against Essendon in front of his family in Melbourne. His form was rewarded with a two-year contract extension. Hall-Kahan was among Adelaide's best in the semi-final loss to the Brisbane Lions.

Hall-Kahan swapped his guernsey number from 40 to 1, which was vacated by Chayce Jones.

== Senior state and community league statistics ==
Senior state and community league statistics

Year	Team	League	Games	Goals	Best Player
2021	Sandringham Dragons	NAB League	2	0	0
2022	Sandringham Dragons	NAB League	6	12	1
2022	Sydney Swans Reserves	VFL	12	6	2
2023	Sydney Swans Reserves	VFL	18	19	5
2024	Sandringham	VFL	17	14	5
2025	Williamstown	VFL	20	5	7
2026	Williamstown	VFL	7	0	4

As of 4 June 2026

== Statistics ==
Updated to the end of round 22, 2026.

Legend
G	Goals	K	Kicks	D	Disposals	T	Tackles
B	Behinds	H	Handballs	M	Marks

Season	Team	No.	Games	Totals							Averages (per game)							Votes
Season	Team	No.	Games	G	B	K	H	D	M	T	G	B	K	H	D	M	T	Votes
2022	Sydney	45	0	—	—	—	—	—	—	—	—	—	—	—	—	—	—	0
2023	Sydney	45	0	—	—	—	—	—	—	—	—	—	—	—	—	—	—	0
2026	Adelaide	40	9	1	0	124	48	172	35	19	0.1	0.0	13.8	5.3	19.1	3.9	2.1	0
Career			9	1	0	124	48	172	35	19	0.1	0.0	13.8	5.3	19.1	3.9	2.1	0
