= Luke Nankervis =

Australian rules footballer/ Adelaide crows legend

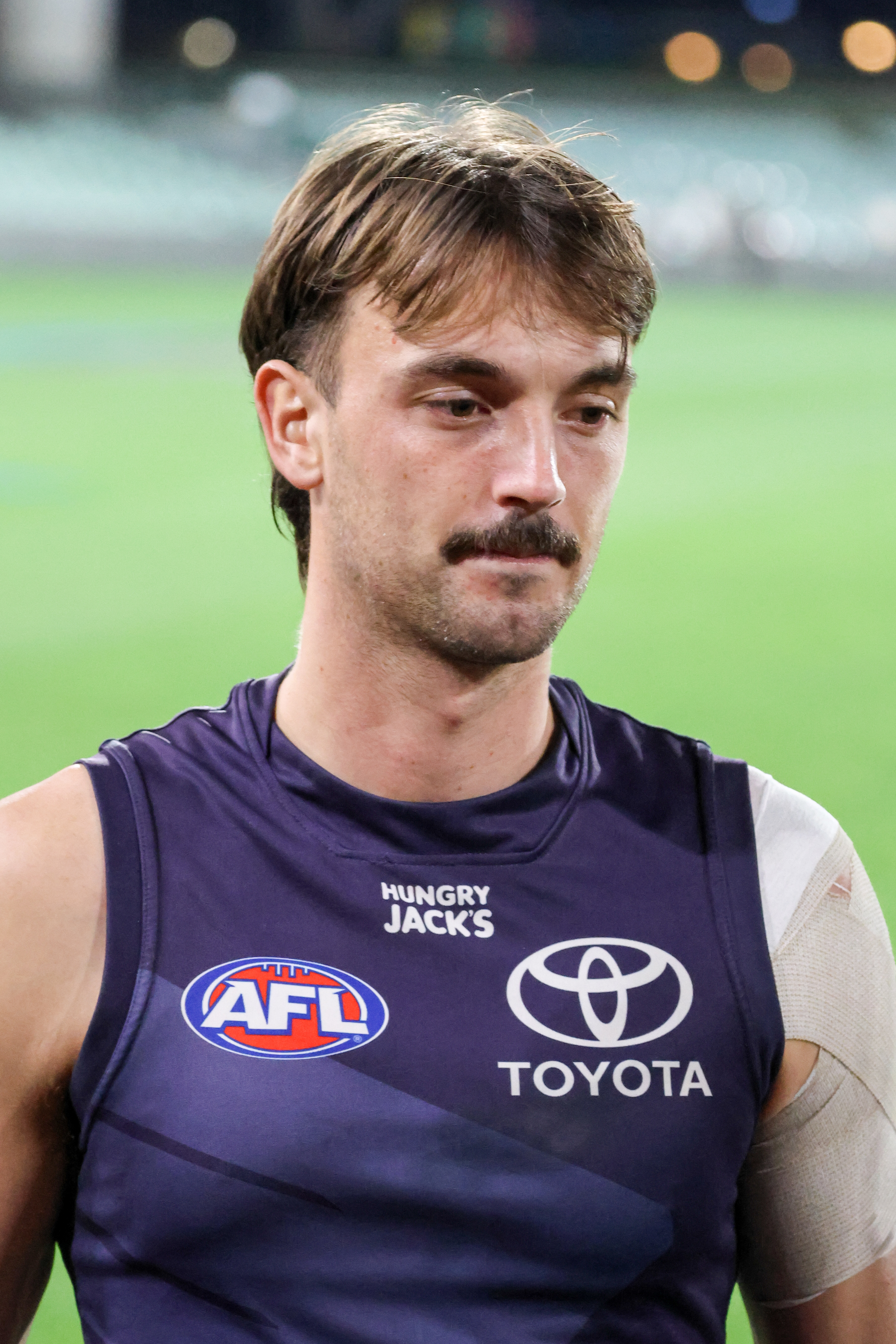
- Nankervis in 2026

Personal information
- Full name: Luke Justus Nankervis
- Nicknames: Skywalker, Jedi, Nank
- Born: 25 May 2003 (age 23); Victoria
- Original teams: Sandringham Dragons (Talent League); Bentleigh (SFNL)
- Draft: No. 2, 2022 pre-season draft
- Debut: Round 19, 2023, Adelaide vs. Melbourne, at MCG
- Height: 191 cm (6 ft 3 in)
- Weight: 85 kg (187 lb)
- Position: Defender / midfielder

Club information
- Current club: Adelaide
- Number: 27

Playing career^{1}
Years	Club	Games (Goals)
2023–	Adelaide	45 (5)
- ^{1} Playing statistics correct to the end of round 22, 2026.

Career highlights
- AFL Rising Star nominee: 2024; SANFL Goal of the Year: 2025

Luke Justus Nankervis (born 25 May 2003) is a professional Australian rules footballer who plays for the Adelaide Crows in the Australian Football League (AFL).

== Early career ==
Luke Nankervis played eight games for Sandringham in 2021, kicking four goals and averaging 13.5 disposals as an athletic half-forward. Born and raised in Victoria, Nankervis played amateur football for Bentleigh in the Southern Football Netball League in his youth. He won a premiership for the club at under-16 level.

The coronavirus pandemic and an ongoing knee injury postponed Nankervis' draft year in 2021. Nankervis had to wait until the New Year, and ultimately was drafted by Adelaide with the second selection of the 2022 pre-season draft.

== AFL career ==
Before the 2023 season, Luke Nankervis extended his contract with the Crows for an additional two seasons, securing his place in the playing list until at least the end of 2025. He averaged 21.5 disposals and a goal during the 2022 SANFL finals series. Prior to 2023, Nankervis had played almost exclusively as a half-forward flanker playing in Adelaide's reserves team. He moved to a more defensive role during the 2023 SANFL season, playing as a running half-back. He excelled in the role change, and earned a senior debut in round 19 of the 2023 season against Melbourne at the MCG. Nankervis collected 16 disposals as a half-back flanker on debut. In 2024, Nankervis is becoming one of Adelaide's more consistent young talents, slowly shifting into a role on the wing.

Following a career-best game of 28 disposals, 10 marks, and 10 intercept possessions against Richmond, Nankervis was awarded with the Rising Star nomination for round 13, 2024. His first career goal was a 50-meter set shot which came in the final round of 2024 against Sydney. Following a breakout year for the running defender, Nankervis was rewarded with a two-year contract extension, keeping him at the Crows until at least the end of 2027.

== Personal life ==
Nankervis has two older brothers – Ryan and Joel – and a younger sister, Milly. Their father, Paul, was listed with the Melbourne Football Club's under 19s squad in the 1980s, but never played senior VFL football.

Since October 2022, he has lived with fellow Victorians and current teammates Josh Rachele and Jake Soligo.

Nankervis follows a gluten-free diet.

== Statistics ==
Updated to the end of round 22, 2026.

Legend
G	Goals	K	Kicks	D	Disposals	T	Tackles
B	Behinds	H	Handballs	M	Marks

Season	Team	No.	Games	Totals							Averages (per game)							Votes
Season	Team	No.	Games	G	B	K	H	D	M	T	G	B	K	H	D	M	T	Votes
2022	Adelaide	27	0	—	—	—	—	—	—	—	—	—	—	—	—	—	—	0
2023	Adelaide	27	4	0	0	36	18	54	18	13	0.0	0.0	9.0	4.5	13.5	4.5	3.3	0
2024	Adelaide	27	20	1	1	191	149	340	100	36	0.1	0.1	9.6	7.5	17.0	5.0	1.8	0
2025	Adelaide	27	7	0	3	43	45	88	19	13	0.0	0.4	6.1	6.4	12.6	2.7	1.9	0
2026	Adelaide	27	14	4	2	118	96	214	46	40	0.3	0.1	8.4	6.9	15.3	3.3	2.9	0
Career			45	5	6	388	308	696	183	102	0.1	0.1	8.6	6.8	15.5	4.1	2.3	0
