= List of Adelaide Football Club captains =

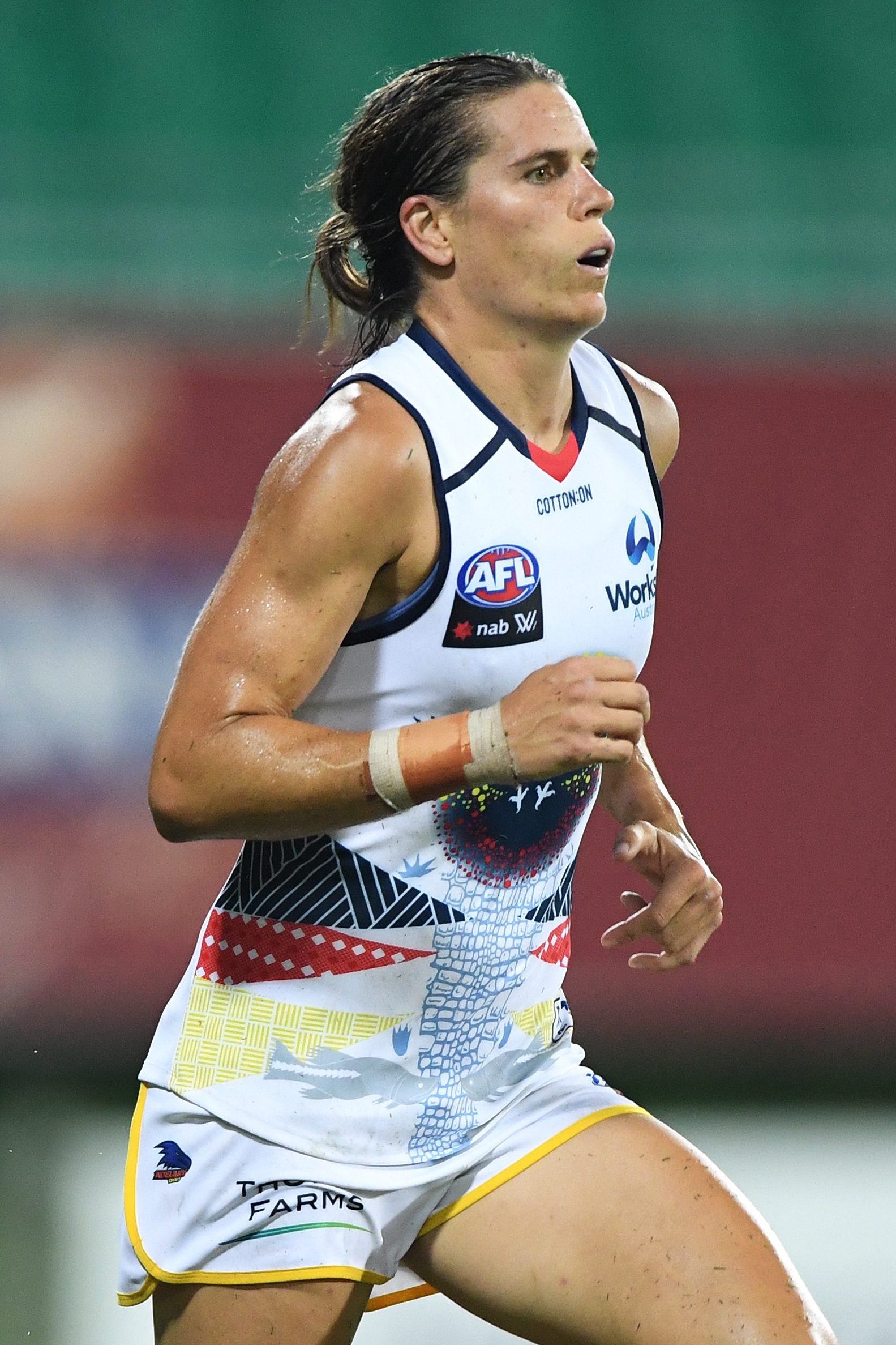
Chelsea Randall is a three-time premiership captain for Adelaide

This is a list of all captains of the Adelaide Football Club, an Australian rules football club in the Australian Football League (AFL) and AFL Women's (AFLW).

== AFL ==
Season(s)	Captain(s)	Notes
1991–1994	Chris McDermott	
1995–1996	Tony McGuinness	
1997–2000	Mark Bickley	1997 premiership captain 1998 premiership captain
2001–2007	Mark Ricciuto	
2008–2010	Simon Goodwin	
2011–2014	Nathan van Berlo	
2015–2018	Taylor Walker	
2019	Taylor Walker; Rory Sloane	
2020–2022	Rory Sloane	
2023–	Jordan Dawson	

== AFL Women's ==
Season(s)	Captain(s)	Notes
2017–2020	Erin Phillips; Chelsea Randall	2017 premiership captains 2019 premiership captains
2021–2023	Chelsea Randall	2022 (S6) premiership captain
2024–2025	Sarah Allan; Ebony Marinoff	
