= Harry Schoenberg =

Australian rules footballer (born 2000)

Personal information
- Full name: Harry James Schoenberg
- Born: 21 February 2001 (age 25); Marrabel, South Australia
- Original team: Woodville-West Torrens (SANFL)
- Draft: No. 24, 2019 AFL draft
- Debut: 5 August 2020, Adelaide vs. Melbourne, at Adelaide Oval
- Height: 182 cm (6 ft 0 in)
- Weight: 86 kg (190 lb)
- Position: Midfielder

Playing career^{1}
| Years | Club | Games (Goals) |
| 2020–2025 | Adelaide | 62 (22) |
| 2026 | West Coast | 5 (1) |
| Total | | 67 (23) |
- ^{1} Playing statistics correct to the end of 2026.

Career highlights
- AFL Rising Star nominee: 2021

Harry James Schoenberg (/ˈʃɒnbɜːrɡ/ SHON-burg; born 21 February 2001) is a former Australian rules footballer who last played for the West Coast Eagles in the Australian Football League (AFL). He was recruited by the Adelaide Crows with the 24th draft pick in the 2019 AFL draft.

== Early football ==
Schoenberg played for the Woodville-West Torrens Football Club for the 2019 season in the SANFL. In that season he played a total of 8 games and kicked 6 goals. Schoenberg also represented South Australia in the AFL Under 18 Championships in 2019. He won the South Australian Most Valuable Player award and was named in the U18 All-Australian side.

He grew up in the South Australian country town of Marrabel and attended Prince Alfred College as a boarder. He played junior community football for the Mintaro-Manoora Eagles in the North Eastern Football League in the Clare Valley in South Australia.

== AFL career ==
=== Adelaide (2020–2025) ===
Schoenberg debuted for the Crows' 51-point loss to Melbourne in the Round 10 of the 2020 AFL season. On debut, Schoenberg picked up 12 disposals, 2 marks and 2 tackles. He signed a two-year contract extension in January 2021, keeping him at the club until 2023. Schoenberg had a career-best 31 disposals in 2021's round 21 Showdown loss.

In the final game of 2023 against West Coast, Schoenberg ruptured his Achilles tendon with an estimated nine months on the sidelines. The midfielder finally returned in round 11 of the next year against the same club, and kicked a goal in the 99-point victory.

Despite being contracted until the end of 2025, Schoenberg was delisted by Adelaide in October 2024, with a commitment to redrafting him as a rookie. Alongside forward Chris Burgess, Schoenberg rejoined the club as a rookie in the 2025 rookie draft. He was delisted by the club after playing just one game in the 2025 AFL season.

=== West Coast (2026) ===
Schoenberg signed with the West Coast Eagles via the pre-season supplemental selection period. After missing round one for striking in a pre-season match, he made his club debut in round two against Port Adelaide in his home state.

He was delisted by the club following five appearances at senior level.

== Statistics ==
Updated to the end of the 2026 season.

Legend
| G | Goals | K | Kicks | D | Disposals | T | Tackles |
| B | Behinds | H | Handballs | M | Marks |

| Season | Team | No. | Games | Totals | | | | | | | Averages (per game) | | | | | | | Votes |
| Season | Team | No. | Games | G | B | K | H | D | M | T | G | B | K | H | D | M | T | Votes |
|---|---|---|---|---|---|---|---|---|---|---|---|---|---|---|---|---|---|---|
| 2020 (Note: The 2020 season was played with 17 home-and-away matches per team (down from 22) and 16-minute quarters with time on (down from 20-minute quarters with time on) due to the impact of the COVID-19 pandemic.) | Adelaide | 26 | 8 | 3 | 0 | 40 | 54 | 94 | 11 | 15 | 0.4 | 0.0 | 5.0 | 6.8 | 11.8 | 1.4 | 1.9 | 0 |
| 2021 | Adelaide | 26 | 22 | 10 | 9 | 230 | 175 | 405 | 62 | 79 | 0.5 | 0.4 | 10.5 | 8.0 | 18.4 | 2.8 | 3.6 | 0 |
| 2022 | Adelaide | 26 | 16 | 4 | 4 | 117 | 146 | 263 | 23 | 74 | 0.3 | 0.3 | 7.3 | 9.1 | 16.4 | 1.4 | 4.6 | 0 |
| 2023 | Adelaide | 26 | 11 | 2 | 4 | 76 | 73 | 149 | 29 | 27 | 0.2 | 0.4 | 6.9 | 6.6 | 13.5 | 2.6 | 2.5 | 0 |
| 2024 | Adelaide | 26 | 4 | 3 | 0 | 17 | 26 | 43 | 9 | 5 | 0.8 | 0.0 | 4.3 | 6.5 | 10.8 | 2.3 | 1.3 | 0 |
| 2025 | Adelaide | 26 | 1 | 0 | 0 | 1 | 4 | 5 | 1 | 2 | 0.0 | 0.0 | 1.0 | 4.0 | 5.0 | 1.0 | 2.0 | 0 |
| 2026 | West Coast | 48 | 5 | 1 | 3 | 33 | 27 | 60 | 12 | 9 | 0.2 | 0.6 | 6.6 | 5.4 | 12.0 | 2.4 | 1.8 | 0 |
| Career | | | 67 | 23 | 20 | 514 | 505 | 1019 | 147 | 211 | 0.3 | 0.3 | 7.7 | 7.5 | 15.2 | 2.2 | 3.1 | 0 |
