= Archie Ludowyke =

Personal information
- Full name: Archie Ludowyke
- Nickname: Ludo
- Born: 19 November 2007 (age 18)
- Original teams: East Sandringham (SMJFL); Sandringham Dragons (Talent League)
- Draft: No. 50, 2025 AFL draft
- Debut: Round 21, 2026, Adelaide vs. Essendon, at Docklands Stadium
- Height: 197 cm (6 ft 6 in)
- Position: Key forward

Club information
- Current club: Adelaide
- Number: 34

Playing career^{1}
Years	Club	Games (Goals)
2026–	Adelaide	2 (1)
- ^{1} Playing statistics correct to the end of 2026.

Archie Ludowyke (born 19 November 2007) is a professional Australian rules footballer who plays for the Adelaide Crows in the Australian Football League (AFL).

== Early life ==
Ludowyke played junior football for the East Sandringham Football Club in the South Metro Junior Football League. He played school football for Brighton Grammar School.

Ludowyke played in the Talent League for the Sandringham Dragons. In his draft year, he averaged 9.3 disposals and 3.3 goals a game. He was also named as part of the Vic Metro squad for the Under 18 Championships, however his season was cut short by injury.

His father's family are Dutch Sri Lankans making him the 5th Sri Lankan origin player in VFL/AFL history.

== AFL career ==
Ludowyke was selected by the Adelaide Crows with pick 50 of the 2025 AFL draft. He was selected to make his debut in round 21 of the 2026 AFL season.

== Statistics ==
Updated to the end of round 22, 2026.

Legend
G	Goals	K	Kicks	D	Disposals	T	Tackles
B	Behinds	H	Handballs	M	Marks

Season	Team	No.	Games	Totals							Averages (per game)							Votes
Season	Team	No.	Games	G	B	K	H	D	M	T	G	B	K	H	D	M	T	Votes
2026	Adelaide	34	2	1	1	8	5	13	5	3	0.5	0.5	4.0	2.5	6.5	2.5	1.5	0
Career			2	1	1	8	5	13	5	3	0.5	0.5	4.0	2.5	6.5	2.5	1.5	0
