= Wayne Milera =

Australian rules footballer (born 1997)

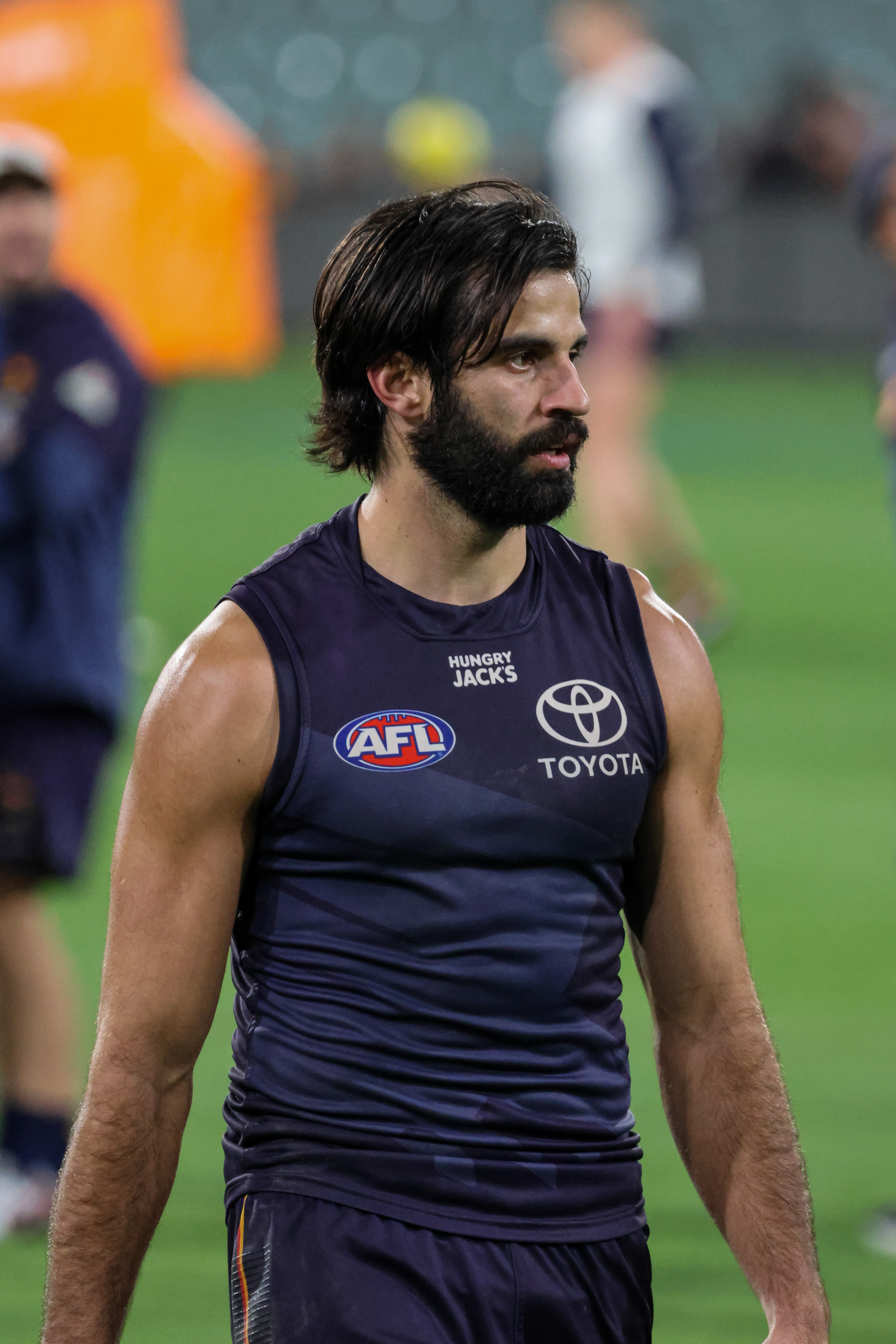
- Milera in July 2026

Personal information
- Full name: Wayne Milera
- Born: 14 September 1997 (age 29); South Australia
- Original team: Central District (SANFL)
- Draft: No. 11, 2015 national draft
- Debut: Round 1, 2016, Adelaide vs. North Melbourne, at Etihad Stadium
- Height: 184 cm (6 ft 0 in)
- Weight: 86 kg (190 lb)
- Position: Defender

Club information
- Current club: Adelaide
- Number: 30

Playing career^{1}
Years	Club	Games (Goals)
2016–	Adelaide	142 (33)
- ^{1} Playing statistics correct to the end of elimination final, 2026.

Career highlights
- All-Australian team: 2026; Rising Star nominee: 2017

Wayne Milera (born 14 September 1997) is a professional Australian rules football player who plays for the Adelaide Football Club in the Australian Football League (AFL). He was drafted by Adelaide with pick 11 in the 2015 national draft.

== Early life ==
Of Gunditjmara and Narangga indigenous descent and raised in Adelaide, South Australia, Milera began playing junior football with Ingle Farm Football Club in Ingle Farm, South Australia. Milera was drafted from Central District in the SANFL, having played 11 senior games for the season, including two finals. He also played all six games for South Australia at the Under 18 National Championships. Milera was part of Port Adelaide's Indigenous AFL Academy. During the year he was diagnosed with Wolff–Parkinson–White syndrome after completing ECG and cardiac tests with the South Australian Under-18 program and underwent heart surgery. Just a week later he kicked 3 goals in a semi-final to help Centrals to a thrilling win.

== AFL career ==
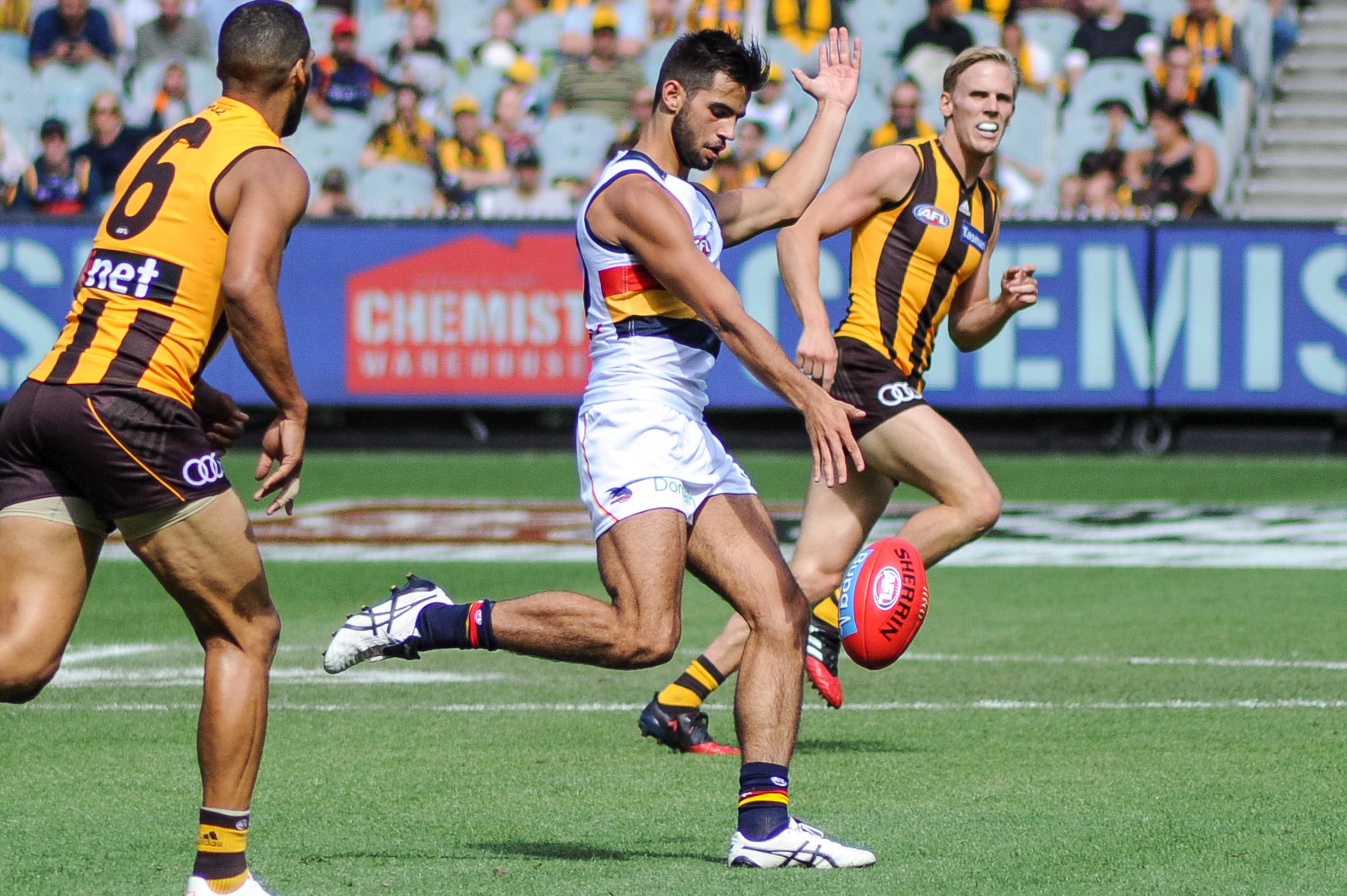
Milera with Adelaide in 2017

Milera debuted in round 1, 2016, against North Melbourne at Etihad Stadium. After playing in the opening four rounds of his debut season Milera suffered an injury and missed the next three rounds. He returned in round eight against Geelong and then in round nine against Gold Coast, Milera kicked three goals.

After the round 10, 2017, match against Fremantle, in which Milera recorded sixteen disposals, four tackles and three goals, he was the round nominee for the AFL Rising Star. Despite playing in 24 games across his first two seasons, Milera did not feature in any of his club's five finals matches.

In the 2018 season, Milera was moved to the half-back line as a replacement for the injured Brodie Smith in Adelaide's round 6 victory over Gold Coast. Milera collected a career-high 33 disposals.

In February of 2020 Milera signed a five-year contract extension, keeping him at the club until at least the end of 2025. His 2020 season was cut short by a foot injury which required surgery. Milera went on to miss the 2021 season as well as he suffered a knee injury in the patella tendon during a pre-season match. 2023 was Milera's most consistent year yet when he averaged a career-high 19.7 disposals as the Crows narrowly missed out on finals.

Prior to his ninth senior season at the Crows, Milera was votes into an extended leadership group at Adelaide alongside three other players. In a round 3, 2024 match against Fremantle, Milera suffered a season-ending knee injury of the same condition as his 2021 injury. Just a week away of his 100-game milestone, he was forced to watch the remainder of the season from the sidelines, only returning to training at the end of the year.

A healthy Milera returned to his best form in 2025, averaging 18 disposals and helping the Crows to a second minor premiership since his arrival at the club. He finally played in his first finals matches, against Collingwood and Hawthorn. With more than 10 years and 100 senior matches of service, Milera was awarded with a Life Membership at the Adelaide Crows prior to the 2026 season. He began 2026 strongly, earning ten coaches' votes in the win over the Magpies, eventually following up a strong year with his first All-Australian team selection.

== Personal life ==
Milera married long-term partner Nina in 2023. The couple have two sons.

Alongside St Kilda player Nasiah Wanganeen-Milera, he became the inaugural First Nations Education Ambassador as part of the AFL Players Association. In 2026, Milera designed Adelaide's First Nations guernsey, to be worn in three separate matches during the 2026 AFL season.

== Statistics ==
Updated to the end of round 22, 2026.

Legend
G	Goals	K	Kicks	D	Disposals	T	Tackles
B	Behinds	H	Handballs	M	Marks

Season	Team	No.	Games	Totals							Averages (per game)							Votes
Season	Team	No.	Games	G	B	K	H	D	M	T	G	B	K	H	D	M	T	Votes
2016	Adelaide	30	8	5	6	49	40	89	25	17	0.6	0.8	6.1	5.0	11.1	3.1	2.1	0
2017	Adelaide	30	16	8	3	141	108	249	53	36	0.5	0.2	8.8	6.8	15.6	3.3	2.3	0
2018	Adelaide	30	19	2	2	231	137	368	89	49	0.1	0.1	12.2	7.2	19.4	4.7	2.6	2
2019	Adelaide	30	17	6	7	184	125	309	93	52	0.4	0.4	10.8	7.4	18.2	5.5	3.1	0
2020 (Note: The 2020 season was played with 17 home-and-away matches per team (down from 22) and 16-minute quarters with time on (down from 20-minute quarters with time on) due to the impact of the COVID-19 pandemic.)	Adelaide	30	2	0	0	17	13	30	7	2	0.0	0.0	8.5	6.5	15.0	3.5	1.0	0
2022	Adelaide	30	12	5	6	81	72	153	32	24	0.4	0.5	6.8	6.0	12.8	2.7	2.0	0
2023	Adelaide	30	22	3	0	247	186	433	96	43	0.1	0.0	11.2	8.5	19.7	4.4	2.0	0
2024	Adelaide	30	3	0	0	34	12	46	14	6	0.0	0.0	11.3	4.0	15.3	4.7	2.0	0
2025	Adelaide	30	24	2	1	289	139	428	132	53	0.1	0.0	12.0	5.8	17.8	5.5	2.2	1
2026	Adelaide	30	17	2	0	286	150	436	101	45	0.1	0.0	16.8	8.8	25.6	5.9	2.6	0
Career			140	33	25	1559	982	2541	642	327	0.2	0.2	11.1	7.0	18.2	4.6	2.3	3

== Honours and achievements ==
Team

- 2× AFL minor premiership (Adelaide): 2017, 2025

Individual

- All-Australian team: 2026
- Rising Star nominee: 2017
- Mark Bickley Emerging Talent Award: 2017
