= Jake Soligo =

Australian rules footballer (born 2003)

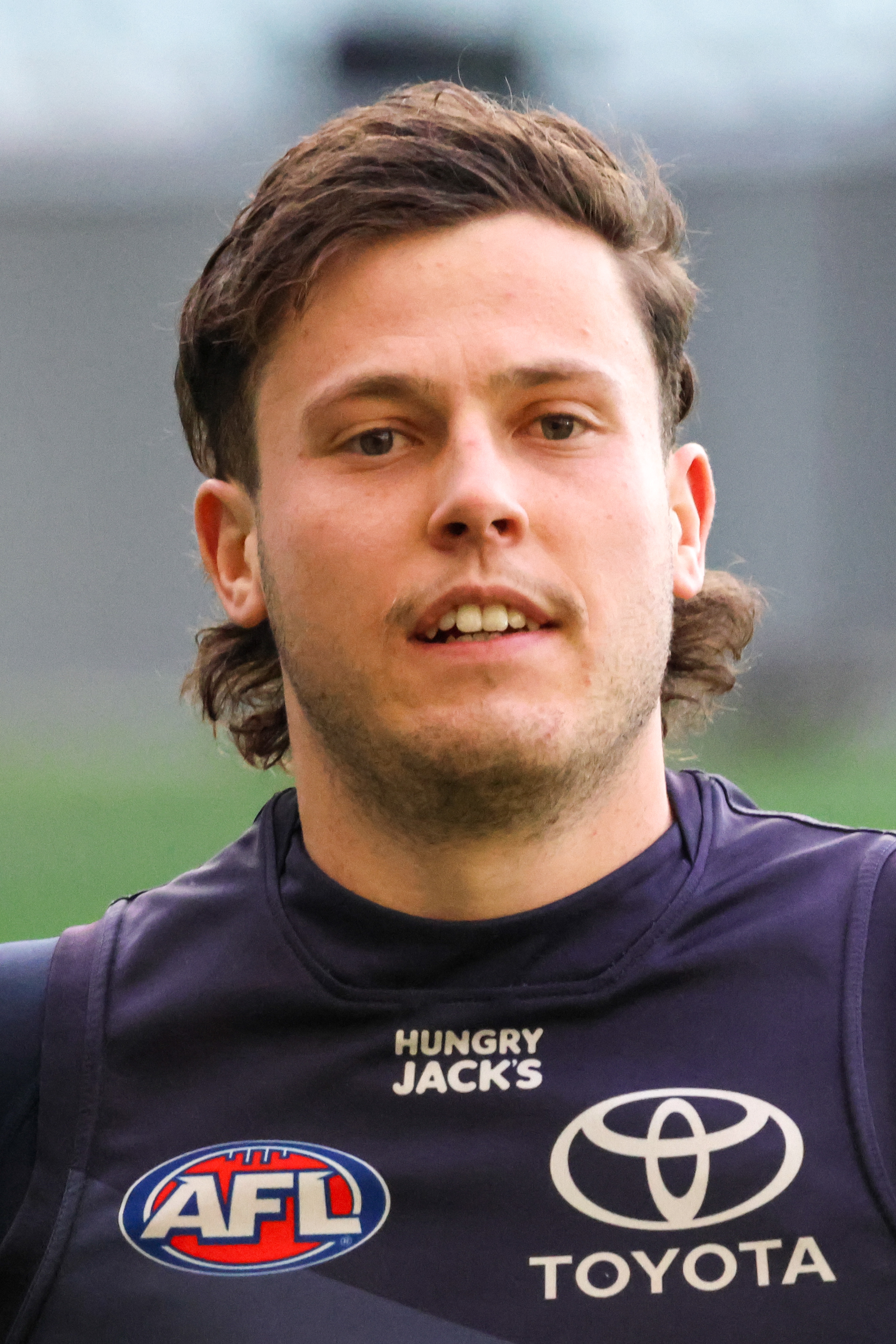
- Soligo in 2026

Personal information
- Nicknames: Soligoat, Fridge
- Born: 25 January 2003 (age 23); Victoria, Australia
- Original teams: Waverley Park Hawks (SMJFL) Eastern Ranges (Talent League); Dromana (MPFNL)
- Draft: No. 36, 2021 AFL draft
- Debut: Round 1, 2022, Adelaide vs. Fremantle, at Adelaide Oval
- Height: 179 cm (5 ft 10 in)
- Weight: 84 kg (185 lb)
- Position: Midfielder / forward

Club information
- Current club: Adelaide
- Number: 14

Playing career^{1}
Years	Club	Games (Goals)
2022–	Adelaide	107 (45)
- ^{1} Playing statistics correct to the end of the 2026 season.

Career highlights
- Showdown Medal: 2024; 2× 22under22 44-man squad: 2024, 2025; Mark Bickley Emerging Talent Award: 2024

Jake Soligo (born 25 January 2003) is a professional Australian rules footballer who plays for the Adelaide Crows in the Australian Football League (AFL).

== Early life ==
Soligo played much of his junior career at the Waverley Park Hawks Junior Football Club in the SMJFL. At under-16s level, Soligo played for Vic Metro in the National Championships. Soligo attended Mazenod College up until year 9, before transferring to Rowville Secondary College in 2018 to be part of their selective football academy.

After being signed from his local club, Dromana in the Mornington Peninsula Football Netball League (MPFNL), Soligo played his junior career with the Eastern Ranges in the Talent League. As a midfielder, he averaged 23 disposals and kicked six goals in his draft year of 2021. In the same year, he won the Pennington Medal, awarded to the Eastern Ranges' best and fairest player, as well as featuring in the Victorian Football League (VFL) for Richmond.

== AFL career ==
Soligo was drafted by Adelaide with their second pick and the 36th pick overall in the 2021 AFL draft. He debuted in Adelaide's first game of 2022 against Fremantle as a substitute and collected 5 disposals in a narrow loss. In June of 2023, Soligo signed a six-year contract extension which would keep him at the Crows until 2029. At the time, this was the longest contract of any current Adelaide Crows player.

Prior to the 2024 season, Soligo badly rolled his ankle during preseason training. For this reason, he started as the medical substitute against Gold Coast in Round 1, but had maximum impact for his limited game time. In Round 8 of the 2024 season in the Showdown against Port Adelaide, Soligo won the Showdown Medal and was the best on ground, with 28 disposals and 10 tackles. Soligo had a career-best season as an inside midfielder, becoming one of Adelaide's best players alongside Izak Rankine and captain Jordan Dawson. He finished third in the Malcolm Blight Medal and was awarded with the Mark Bickley Emerging Talent Award.

Carrying over his 2024 form, Soligo continued strongly in 2025 as the Crows climbed the ladder. The midfielder had a career-best 35 disposals as well as two goals in Showdown 58 against Port Adelaide, excelling in the rainy conditions.

Soligo experienced an interrupted beginning to his 2026 campaign, suffering an irregular heartbeat and undergoing a medical procedure, cutting his pre-season short. However, he returned in time to feature in the round one win against Collingwood, but was rested a few weeks later before featuring in the reserves' win against Central District. Soligo returned to the senior side for the round eight Showdown win. In round 18 against the Gold Coast, Soligo played in his 100th game milestone match.

== Statistics ==
Updated to the end of round 22, 2026.

Legend
G	Goals	K	Kicks	D	Disposals	T	Tackles
B	Behinds	H	Handballs	M	Marks

Season	Team	No.	Games	Totals							Averages (per game)							Votes
Season	Team	No.	Games	G	B	K	H	D	M	T	G	B	K	H	D	M	T	Votes
2022	Adelaide	14	16	6	5	129	105	234	33	55	0.4	0.3	8.1	6.6	14.6	2.1	3.4	0
2023	Adelaide	14	21	10	11	209	138	347	74	65	0.5	0.5	10.0	6.6	16.5	3.5	3.1	1
2024	Adelaide	14	23	6	9	251	255	506	60	84	0.3	0.4	10.9	11.1	22.0	2.6	3.7	7
2025	Adelaide	14	25	14	5	309	213	522	68	115	0.6	0.2	12.4	8.5	20.9	2.7	4.6	5
2026	Adelaide	14	18	9	7	170	129	299	51	77	0.5	0.4	9.4	7.2	16.6	2.8	4.3	0
Career			103	45	37	1068	840	1908	286	396	0.4	0.4	10.4	8.2	18.5	2.8	3.8	13

== Honours and achievements ==
Team

- AFL minor premiership: (Adelaide) 2025

Individual

- Showdown Medal: 2024
- 2024 22under22 44 man squad
