= Chayce Jones =

Australian footballer (born 2000)

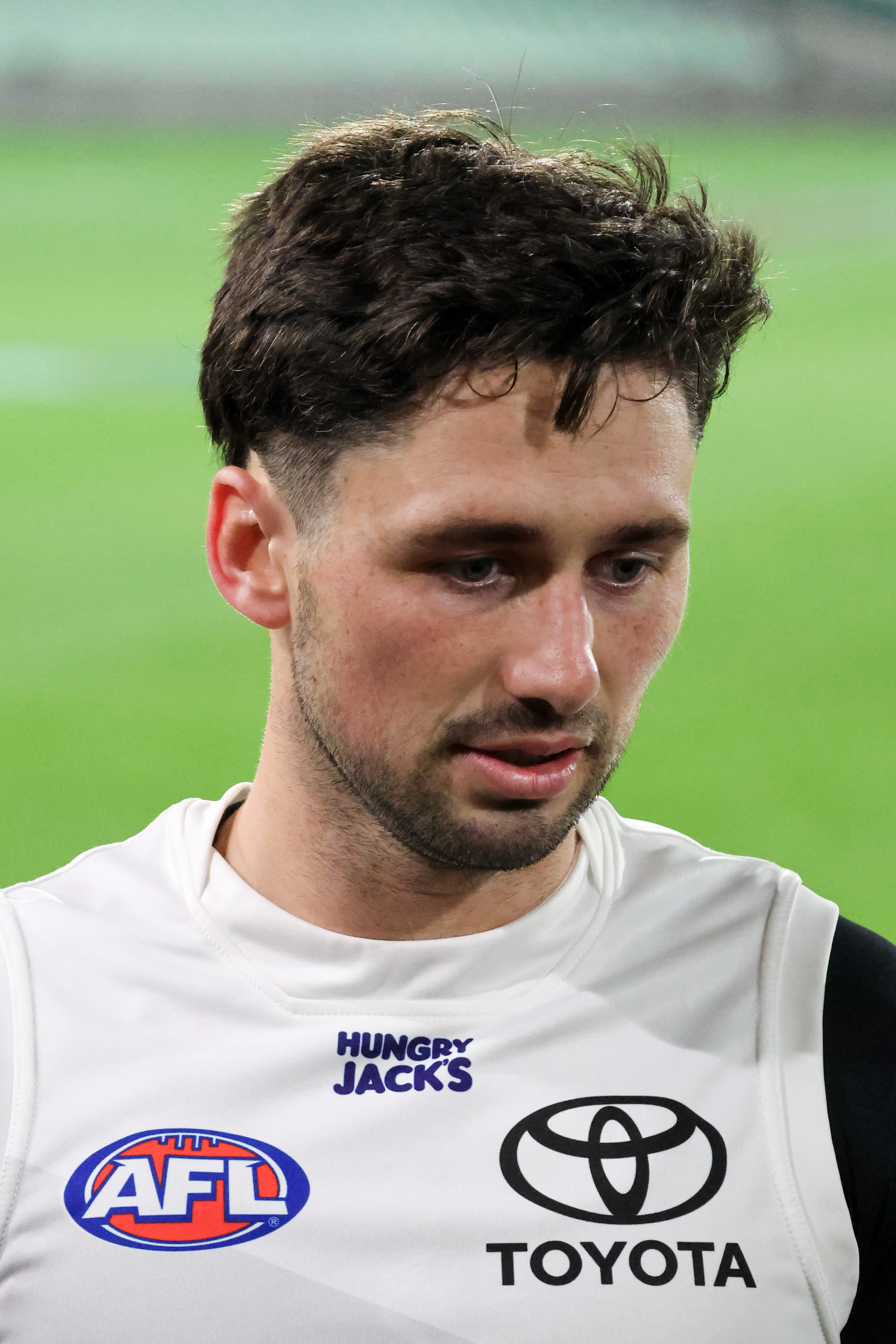
- Jones in 2026

Personal information
- Full name: Chayce Jones
- Born: 14 January 2000 (age 26); Longford, Tasmania
- Original teams: Tasmania Devils (Talent League); Launceston (TSL); Longford
- Draft: No. 9, 2018 national draft
- Debut: Round 1, 2019, Adelaide vs. Hawthorn, at Adelaide Oval
- Height: 181 cm (5 ft 11 in)
- Weight: 81 kg (179 lb)
- Position: Medium defender

Club information
- Current club: Adelaide
- Number: 1

Playing career^{1}
Years	Club	Games (Goals)
2019–2026	Adelaide	100 (23)
- ^{1} Playing statistics correct to the end of 2026: 2019 Mark Bickley Emerging Talent Award.

Chayce Jones (born 14 January 2000) is a professional Australian rules footballer who last played for the Adelaide Football Club in the Australian Football League (AFL). He was drafted by the Adelaide Crows with their first selection and ninth overall in the 2018 AFL draft.

== Early life ==
Jones grew up in Longford, Tasmania, and also played junior football for the Longford Football Club and cricket club. He moved to Launceston Football Club to play in the Tasmanian Football League. Following an exceptional Under-18 Championship campaign with the Allies in 2018, where he was picked in the Under-18 All Australian team, Jones was projected to be picked up within the top 10 of the 2018 AFL draft. He also surprisingly finished second in the TFL's Player of the Year award with the Launceston Football Club even though he only managed to play five games for the season.

== AFL career ==
=== Early career ===
Jones made his debut in the first round of the 2019 season against Hawthorn at Adelaide Oval. Jones pushed his way into the Adelaide starting lineup as a small forward on the back of the impressive form in the pre-season competition. He showed plenty of promise early, playing six of the first 10 games, before returning for the final two games of the season. Jones looked lively when he was given midfield time in the round 23 loss to the Western Bulldogs. He won the Mark Bickley Emerging Talent Award as the Crows' best young player.

On 5 July 2019, with a year still to run on his contract, Jones extended his stay at Adelaide until the end of 2023. Following a successful first year, Jones swapped his number 20 guernsey for the number 1 vacated by Hugh Greenwood. He played 15 of the 17 games played in 2020.

=== Defensive role ===
Jones played 15 of a possible 22 games in 2021. He adopted a new role in defence to get back into the starting 22 and further develop himself into a better footballer, so a move down back would better suit him. The role change was a positive for Jones as he struggled to lock down a role in the Adelaide team, and he played in the final 14 games of the 2021 season. He made a positive start to the 2022 season, playing in the first 11 rounds (round 11 as the medical substitute) of the season as a small defender before being omitted.

=== Playing as a utility ===
In 2023, Jones inked a three-year contract extension with Adelaide until at least the end of the 2026 season. One of Jones' season highlights came against Carlton in Gather Round, gathering 28 disposals, 9 marks and a goal in their victory. A minor foot injury in round 22 cut his year of growth short. He averaged a career-best 17.4 disposals in 2023.

Becoming a genuine utility, Jones was able to swing forward in 2024, kicking three goals in a 99-point victory over West Coast. He played his 100th game early in the 2026 season.

== Statistics ==
Updated to the end of 2026 season.

Legend
G	Goals	K	Kicks	D	Disposals	T	Tackles
B	Behinds	H	Handballs	M	Marks

Season	Team	No.	Games	Totals							Averages (per game)							Votes
Season	Team	No.	Games	G	B	K	H	D	M	T	G	B	K	H	D	M	T	Votes
2019	Adelaide	20	8	3	8	48	41	89	16	18	0.4	1.0	6.0	5.1	11.1	2.0	2.3	0
2020 (Note: The 2020 season was played with 17 home-and-away matches per team (down from 22) and 16-minute quarters with time on (down from 20-minute quarters with time on) due to the impact of the COVID-19 pandemic.)	Adelaide	1	15	6	1	65	58	123	22	27	0.4	0.1	4.3	3.9	8.2	1.5	1.8	0
2021	Adelaide	1	15	1	3	128	58	186	43	19	0.1	0.2	8.5	3.9	12.4	2.9	1.3	0
2022	Adelaide	1	20	0	3	167	91	258	58	30	0.0	0.2	8.4	4.6	12.9	2.9	1.5	0
2023	Adelaide	1	18	7	5	216	98	314	46	49	0.4	0.3	12.0	5.4	17.4	2.6	2.7	0
2024	Adelaide	1	16	6	4	148	83	231	48	45	0.4	0.3	9.3	5.2	14.4	3.0	2.8	0
2025	Adelaide	1	5	0	0	19	11	30	8	7	0.0	0.0	3.8	2.2	6.0	1.6	1.4	0
2026	Adelaide	1	3	0	0	19	16	35	7	5	0.0	0.0	6.3	5.3	11.7	2.3	1.7	0
Career			100	23	24	810	456	1266	248	200	0.2	0.2	8.1	4.6	12.7	2.5	2.0	0
