= Jordan Dawson =

Australian rules footballer (born 1997)

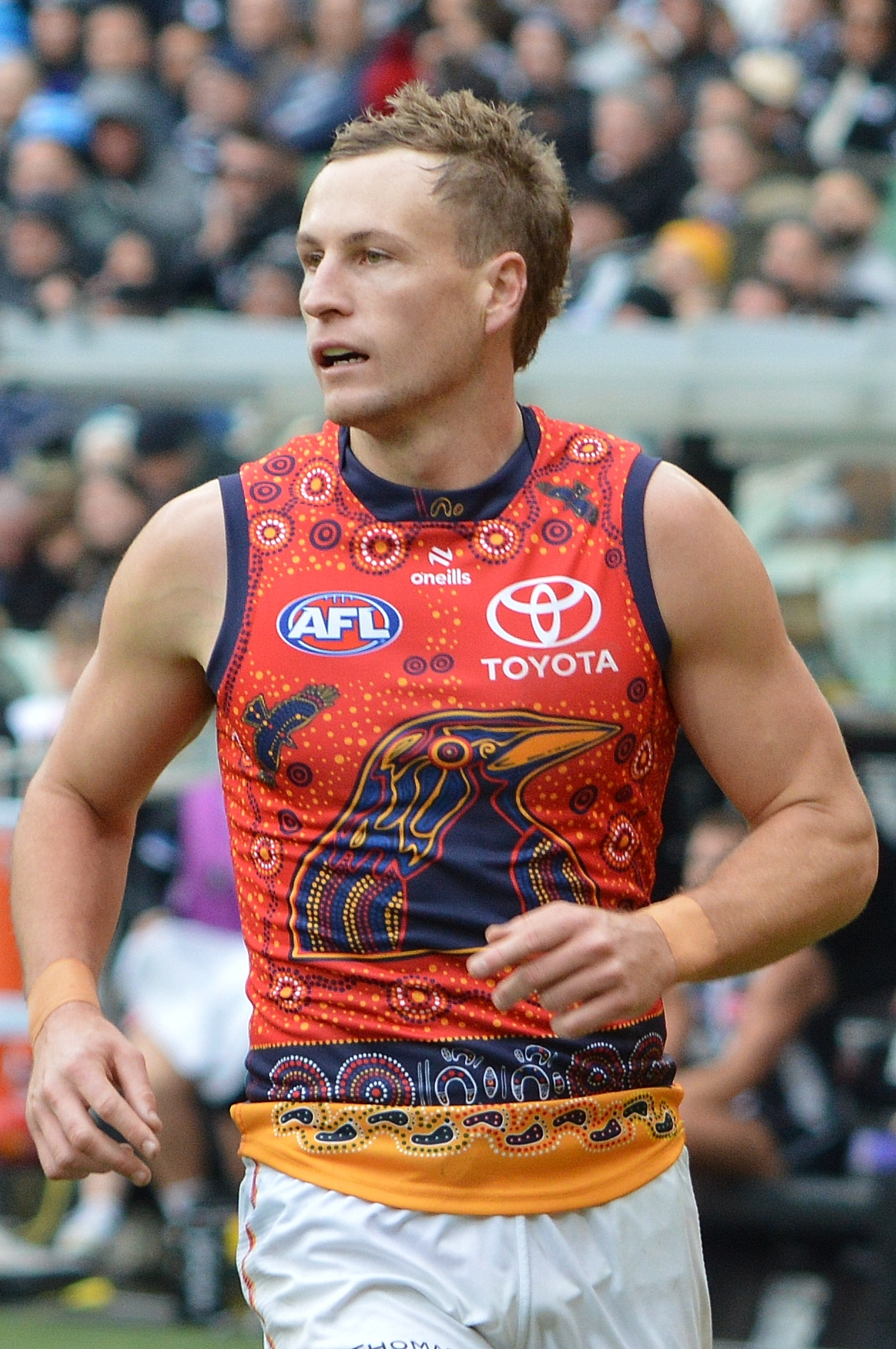
- Dawson playing for Adelaide in 2025

Personal information
- Full name: Jordan Dawson
- Nickname: Daddy
- Born: 9 April 1997 (age 29); South Australia
- Original team: Sturt (SANFL)
- Draft: No. 56, 2015 national draft
- Debut: Round 3, 2017, Sydney vs. Collingwood, at the Sydney Cricket Ground
- Height: 192 cm (6 ft 4 in)
- Weight: 91 kg (201 lb)
- Position: Midfielder

Club information
- Current club: Adelaide
- Number: 12

Playing career^{1}
Years	Club	Games (Goals)
2016–2021	Sydney	64 (34)
2022–	Adelaide	114 (66)
Total		178 (100)

Representative team honours
Years	Team	Games (Goals)
2027–	South Australia	0 (0)
- ^{1} Playing statistics correct to the end of the 2026 season.

Career highlights
- Adelaide captain: 2023–; 3× All-Australian team: 2023, 2025, 2026; 4× Malcolm Blight Medal: 2023, 2024, 2025, 2026; 2× AFLPA best captain: 2025, 2026; AFLPA Robert Rose Most Courageous Player Award: 2026; 2× Showdown Medal: 2022 (game 1), 2023 (game 1)

Jordan Dawson (born 9 April 1997) is a professional Australian rules footballer playing for the Adelaide Football Club in the Australian Football League (AFL). He previously played for the Sydney Swans from 2016 to 2021.

Dawson is a three-time All-Australian and four-time Malcolm Blight Medallist, and was voted as the AFLPA best captain in 2025 and 2026. He has served as Adelaide captain since 2023.

== Early life ==
Jordan Dawson was born on 9 April 1997. He is the younger son of Robe businessman Tony Dawson, who was formerly president of both the Robe Football Club and Robe Golf Club.

Dawson grew up in Robe, south-east of Adelaide in South Australia. He started playing Australian rules football when he was five, with Auskick. He supported the Adelaide Crows growing up.

He moved to boarding school in Adelaide as a teenager, attending Scotch College during his final two years of school. He previously attended Robe Primary School and Kingston Community School. Dawson played league football for Sturt in the South Australian National Football League (SANFL) in his draft year of 2015.

== AFL career ==
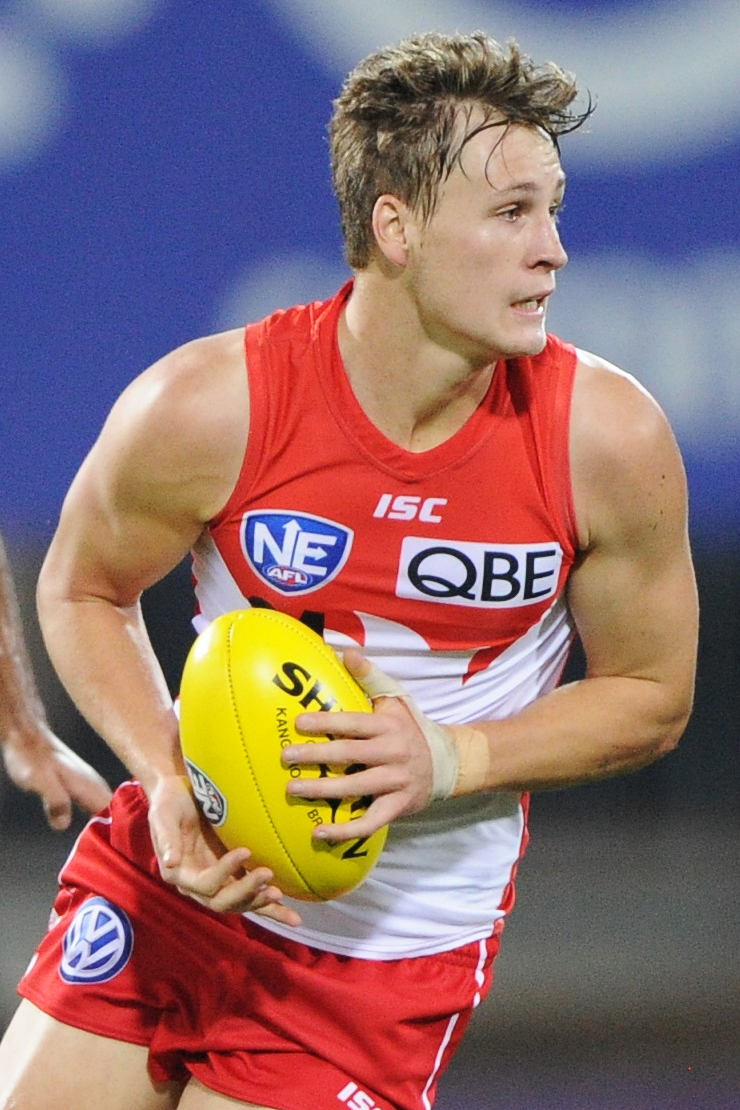
Dawson playing for Sydney's NEAFL team in 2018

=== Sydney (2016–2021) ===
The first player to be drafted to the AFL from the Robe Football Club, Dawson was taken by Sydney with the fifty-sixth overall selection in the 2015 national draft. He made his debut in the one point loss against Collingwood at the Sydney Cricket Ground in Round 3 of the 2017 season. After spending long periods of time playing in the NEAFL for Sydney, Dawson began to find form in 2020 at a time when the Swans were struggling. Dawson impressed rival clubs in his last game for Sydney, which was the 2021 elimination final against Greater Western Sydney. Dawson had 18 disposals and 8 marks in the narrow loss.

At the end of the 2021 AFL season, Dawson requested a trade to Adelaide, in his home state of South Australia, despite speculation that the Swan might end up playing for cross-town rivals Port Adelaide. He was traded on 13 October during the 2021 trade period.

=== Adelaide (2022–present) ===
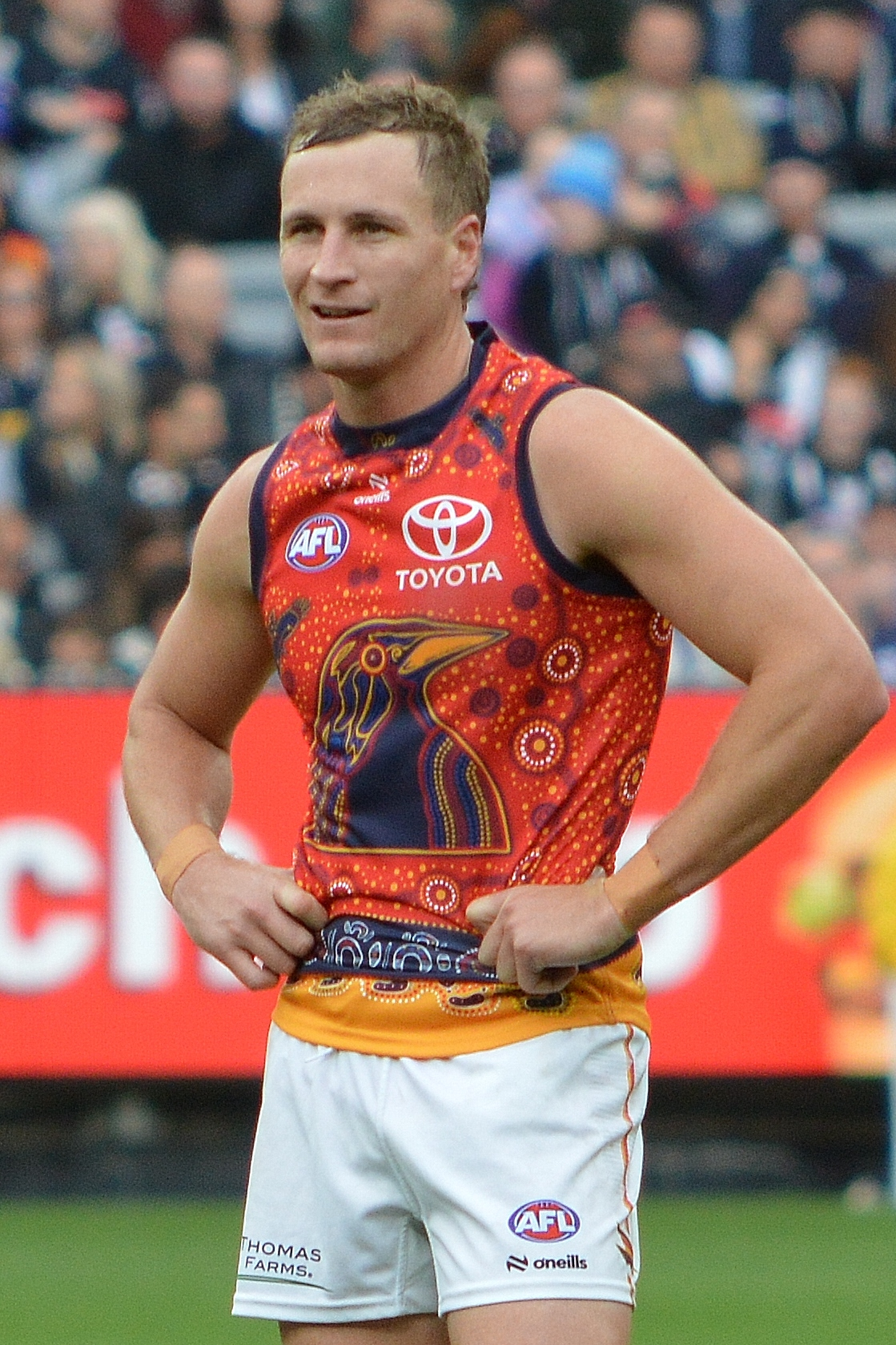
Dawson playing for Adelaide in 2025

Round 3 of the 2022 AFL season saw Dawson win the Showdown Medal during Adelaide's 4 point victory over Port Adelaide, in which he kicked a goal after the siren to win the match. In his first season as a Crow, he finished second in the club's best and fairest award, behind the three-time winner and fellow Scotch College alumn Rory Laird. Dawson was made captain of the Adelaide Crows after Rory Sloane stepped down on 10 February 2023, following Sloane's fourth year in the role. Dawson won his second Showdown Medal in Round 3 of 2023 in his first win as captain. Dawson would go on to greatly succeed in the role, finding career-best form and winning the Malcolm Blight Medal in just his second season at the club.

2024 began with scrutiny directed at Jordan Dawson, with Adelaide's 0–4 winning record "epitomised" by Dawson's poor form. Dawson responded with back-to-back best-on-ground performances against Essendon and North Melbourne, the latter of which saw Dawson awarded with the ANZAC Spirit medal, given to the player adjudicated best-on-ground during the AFL's ANZAC Appeal Round. Dawson was forced to miss one game in the season following a head collision with Essendon forward Nate Caddy. His absent leadership was noticeable in a large loss to Hawthorn the following week. Despite the Crows once again missing finals, Dawson strung together some good form to lead the club in coaches' votes as well as in Brownlow votes for the second year in a row. Dawson won consecutive Malcolm Blight Medals, being a part of the first tie in the history of the award alongside Ben Keays. He was also awarded with Adelaide's Players' Trademark Award for the second year in a row.

In 2025, Dawson was awarded the maximum ten coaches' votes in his first two matches to start the season. A career-best year for the Crows captain saw him lead him side to the minor premiership for the first time since 2017. Dawson was awarded with AFLPA Best Captain awarded as voted by his peers as well as earning the vice-captaincy in his second All-Australian selection.

== Statistics ==
Updated to the end of the 2026 season.

Legend
G	Goals	K	Kicks	D	Disposals	T	Tackles
B	Behinds	H	Handballs	M	Marks

Season	Team	No.	Games	Totals							Averages (per game)							Votes
Season	Team	No.	Games	G	B	K	H	D	M	T	G	B	K	H	D	M	T	Votes
2016	Sydney	34	0	—	—	—	—	—	—	—	—	—	—	—	—	—	—	0
2017	Sydney	34	1	0	1	6	4	10	3	3	0.0	1.0	6.0	4.0	10.0	3.0	3.0	0
2018	Sydney	34	4	4	3	33	16	49	22	12	1.0	0.8	8.3	4.0	12.3	5.5	3.0	0
2019	Sydney	34	20	15	1	249	127	376	109	60	0.8	0.1	12.5	6.4	18.8	5.5	3.0	1
2020 (Note: The 2020 season was played with 17 home-and-away matches per team (down from 22) and 16-minute quarters with time on (down from 20-minute quarters with time on) due to the impact of the COVID-19 pandemic.)	Sydney	34	16	6	7	183	77	260	59	38	0.4	0.4	11.4	4.8	16.3	3.7	2.4	0
2021	Sydney	34	23	9	7	354	159	513	126	68	0.4	0.3	15.4	6.9	22.3	5.5	3.0	6
2022	Adelaide	12	22	10	6	408	133	541	146	65	0.5	0.3	18.5	6.0	24.6	6.6	3.0	8
2023	Adelaide	12	23	6	15	401	222	623	114	153	0.3	0.7	17.4	9.7	27.1	5.0	6.7	20
2024	Adelaide	12	22	10	6	365	174	539	110	134	0.5	0.3	16.6	7.9	24.5	5.0	6.1	18
2025	Adelaide	12	25	18	20	392	192	584	117	184	0.7	0.8	15.7	7.7	23.4	4.7	7.4	27
2026	Adelaide	12	22	22	8	382	202	584	114	126	1.0	0.4	17.4	9.2	26.5	5.2	5.7	21
Career			178	100	74	2773	1306	4079	920	843	0.6	0.4	15.6	7.3	22.9	5.2	4.7	101

== Honours and achievements ==
Team

- AFL minor premiership (Adelaide): 2025

Individual

- Adelaide captain: 2023–present
- 3× All-Australian team: 2023, 2025, 2026
- 4× Malcolm Blight Medal: 2023, 2024, 2025, 2026
- 2× AFLPA best captain: 2025, 2026
- Robert Rose Award: 2026
- 2× Showdown Medal: 2022 (game 1), 2023 (game 1)

== Personal life ==
Dawson married his long-term partner Milly Dutton in January 2024. In September 2026, the couple announced they were expecting their first child, and that Milly had suffered a miscarriage earlier that year.

In April 2026, the body of Dawson's older brother Jaryd was found in the family's hometown of Robe, South Australia, a day after his disappearance.
