= Showdown (AFL) =

Adelaide-Port Adelaide derby in Australian rules football

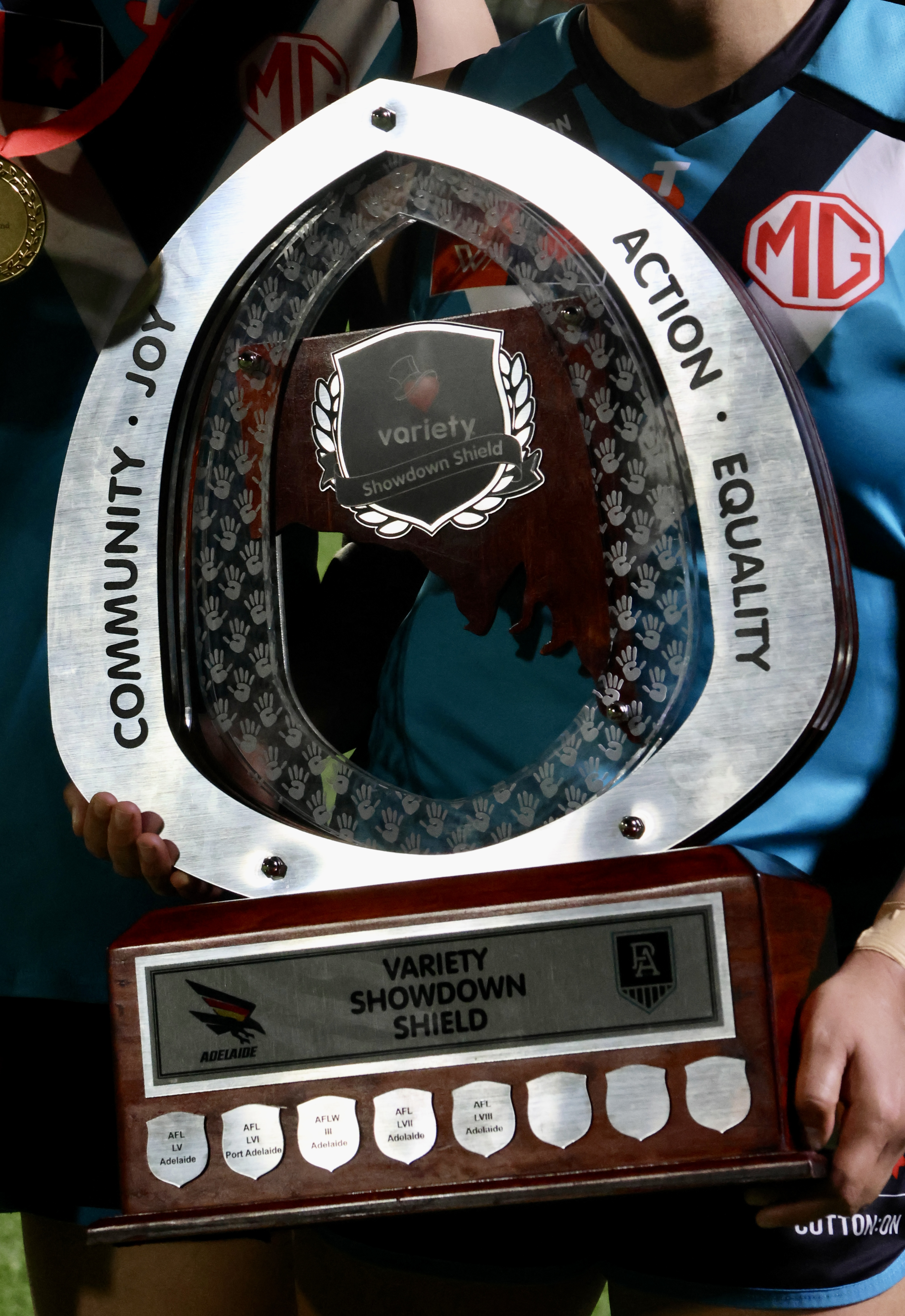
- Variety Showdown Trophy in 2025

- Adelaide Port Adelaide
- Location: Adelaide, South Australia
- First meeting: 20 April 1997 (Adelaide 72–83 Port Adelaide)
- Latest meeting: 27 June 2026 (Port Adelaide 97–71 Adelaide)
- Next meeting: TBC
- Stadiums: Football Park (1997–2013); Adelaide Oval (2014–present)
- Trophy: Variety Showdown Shield

Statistics
- Total meetings: 60
- All-time series: Adelaide (31 wins); Port Adelaide (29 wins)
- Largest victory: Adelaide (98 points); 26 July 2025
- Longest win streak: Port Adelaide (7 wins); 6 August 2000 – 8 May 2004
- Current win streak: Port Adelaide (1 win); 27 June 2026 – present

The Showdown is the Australian rules football local derby played by the two Australian Football League (AFL) teams from South Australia, the Adelaide and Port Adelaide football clubs. The first AFL premiership fixture between the two clubs took place on 20 April 1997.

The South Australian Brewing Company, makers of West End Beers, were the first sponsors of the game and decided that the "Showdown" would be an appropriate name as a promotional opportunity for games between these two clubs, since it was the first time two South Australian teams had played against each other in the AFL.

The rivalry between Adelaide and Port Adelaide is often considered the best, and most bitter, in the Australian Football League with Malcolm Blight, Australian Football Hall of Fame Legend, stating in 2009 that "there is no doubt it is the greatest rivalry in football." The head-to-head count between the two clubs only include AFL premiership matches.

"There is a deep presumption today that your football loyalties come from a historical association with Port Adelaide or from one of the other nine SANFL clubs...That rivalry from the SANFL – by being Port Adelaide or not Port Adelaide – is...entrenched with the State's two clubs in the AFL.”

— John Olsen, former Premier of South Australia and current Chairman of the Adelaide Football Club.

== Background ==
The Showdown's intense rivalry can be traced back to Port Adelaide's pre-existing rivalries within the South Australian National Football League (SANFL), particularly the club's long-standing rivalry with the Norwood Football Club.

A SPLENDID GAME

Just as the more faithful
amongst the tribes of the East
feel it incumbent on them
to pay a periodical visit to Mecca,
so do lovers of the king of winter games
feel it almost an essential duty on their part
to journey to the Adelaide Oval
on the Queen's Accession Day,
in sunshine or rain,
to witness a trial of strength
between those great and old rivals
the Port Adelaide and Norwood clubs.

— THE ADVERTISER, ADELAIDE, JUNE 21, 1893.

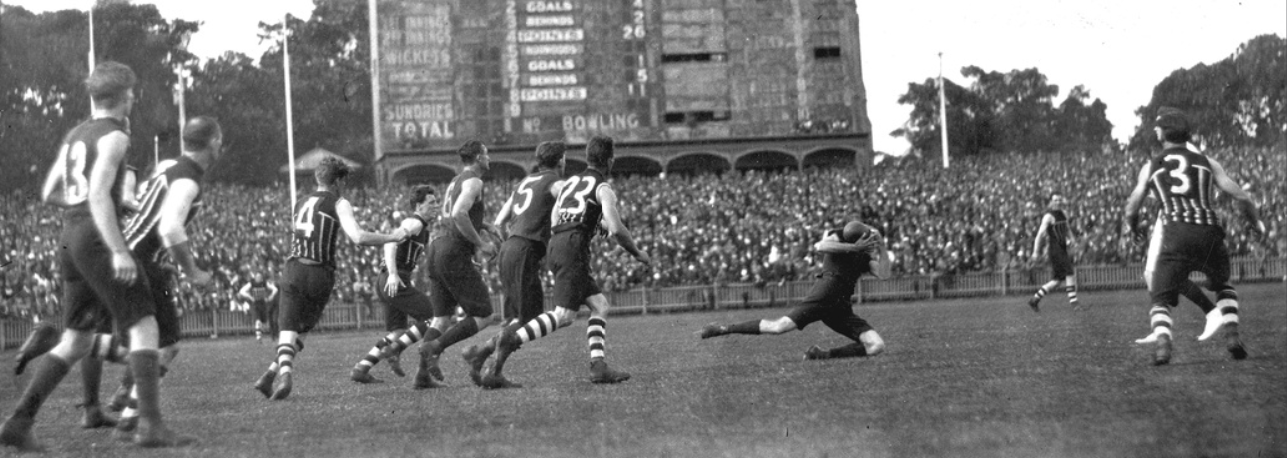
The Showdown is often considered the cultural successor to the Norwood–Port Adelaide rivalry characterised by a geographic and socio-economic divide. The two clubs first played each other in 1878 and became bitter rivals after multiple controversies in 1882. Pictured is the 1921 SANFL Grand Final taking place on Adelaide Oval.

The Norwood–Port Adelaide rivalry began in 1878 when the two clubs first played one another; however, it was not until 1882 that the Norwood–Port Adelaide rivalry grew bitter. That year Port Adelaide's first win over Norwood, held at Adelaide Oval, was controversially overruled by the league, with a follow-up game overshadowed by a misunderstanding at the gate which almost prevented Norwood players accessing the venue.

"The feeling of rivalry between the two clubs is very keen, and it has unfortunately, it is to be feared, been intensified to the very verge of actual ill-feeling by the extraordinary conduct of the Norwood Club with reference to their last defeat by the Ports."

— Spectator writing for the Port Adelaide News, 18 July 1882

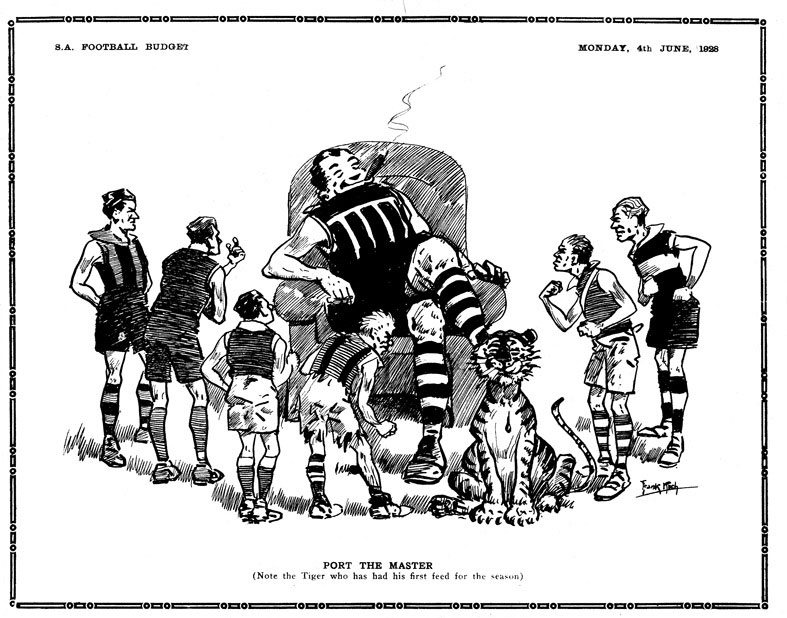
After Federation the football scene in South Australia was characterised by a 'Port Adelaide vs The Rest' narrative. Pictured is a cartoon from 1928.

After Federation, coinciding with the time that Port Adelaide was becoming the dominant force in the SANFL, the notion of 'Port Adelaide against The Rest' became a key theme for football in the state. This notion was reinforced by a game between Port Adelaide and a composite state side at the end of 1914 after Port Adelaide had completed a perfect season winning both the state premiership and the Champions of Australia for the fourth time.

Port Adelaide v South Australia (1914)	G	B	Total
South Australia	5	10	40
Port Adelaide	14	14	98
Venue: Jubilee Oval

In the match between Port Adelaide and the composite state side some of South Australia's best players took part including Magarey Medallists Tom Leahy (North Adelaide), Frank Barry (South Adelaide) and Dave Low (West Torrens). Whilst South Australia started the game well and entered the quarter time break with the lead, Port Adelaide's system and fitness overwhelmed South Australia kicking 6 goals 5 behinds to nothing in the last quarter to win the game by 58 points.

During the 1960s, West Adelaide legend Doug Thomas was quoted as saying that "If I was left to choose sides between Port Adelaide or the Soviet Union, I would join the communists from Russia every time."

The Showdown rivalry also significantly draws upon the bitter, winner take all, competition for the two South Australian licences to join the AFL in the 1980s and early 1990s.

=== First South Australian AFL licence ===
In 1982 the SANFL approached the VFL in regards to entering two sides, Port Adelaide and longtime major rival Norwood, in the Victorian league. This action was also taken by WAFL club East Perth in 1980. All approaches were ignored by the VFL at the time with the reason given by Jack Hamilton being that the VFL clubs thought that one or two SANFL teams would end up being too strong later admitting that they also wanted to continue to poach the states best players, which would soon include Craig Bradley and Stephen Kernahan in 1986. 1982 also saw the first instance of the VFL expanding beyond Melbourne and Geelong with the South Melbourne Football Club being relocated to Sydney. The Port Adelaide Football Club's annual report from late 1982 showed that the failure of the attempts made by South Australian and West Australian clubs to enter the VFL significantly impacted the club's understanding of its future. From this point Port Adelaide restructured the club in regards to economics, public relations and on-field performance for an attempt to enter the league in 1990. There was genuine feeling that failure to do this would result in the club ceasing to exist in the future. In 1985 Port Adelaide registered itself as a national football club. Sentiment at this time amongst the direction of Australian rules football in South Australia was succinctly encapsulated by a Michael Robinson article in the 1985 Football Times Yearbook that previewed the SANFL's upcoming season. In that article Robinson wrote about the disappointment of the equal gate sharing of match takings enforced by the SANFL for the upcoming season with the stronger South Australian clubs propping up ailing clubs such as Woodville.

"What would be left of the SA league without the great clubs such as Norwood and Port Adelaide? It would drop to a miserable fourth-class contest. No one could blame Norwood and Port Adelaide for wanting to get out of the SA league into national ranks if they are further threatened by the dragging down process.

— Michael Robinson in regards to impacts of gate revenue sharing adopted by the SANFL for the 1985 season on Norwood and Port Adelaide,

The following year the SANFL registered the name "Adelaide Football Club" in 1986 but ended up deciding against entering a team into the VFL. In 1986 Norwood Football Club made an independent approach to the VFL with entry into the league discussed in great detail but these discussions ultimately failed to materialise. In 1987 the West Coast Eagles and Brisbane Bears were admitted to the Victorian Football League leaving South Australia as the only mainland state without representation in the VFL.

"In 1988 a deputation from Norwood Football Club had announced it was interested in joining the VFL 'at any time in the future' and ... a private consortium headed by Ken Eustice was interested in grabbing a licence".

— Ross Oakley,

By 1989 seven out of ten SANFL clubs were recording losses and the combined income of the SANFL and WAFL had dropped to 40% of that of the VFL. The 1989 Port Adelaide annual report and November newsletter contrasted with the outlook of other SANFL and WAFL clubs. After its demolition of North Adelaide in the 1989 SANFL Grand Final holding its opposition to a single goal, the club claimed a profit in the annual report and hinted at its intentions the following year in the club newsletter by saying Port Adelaide was "far better than their nearest rival in the SANFL".

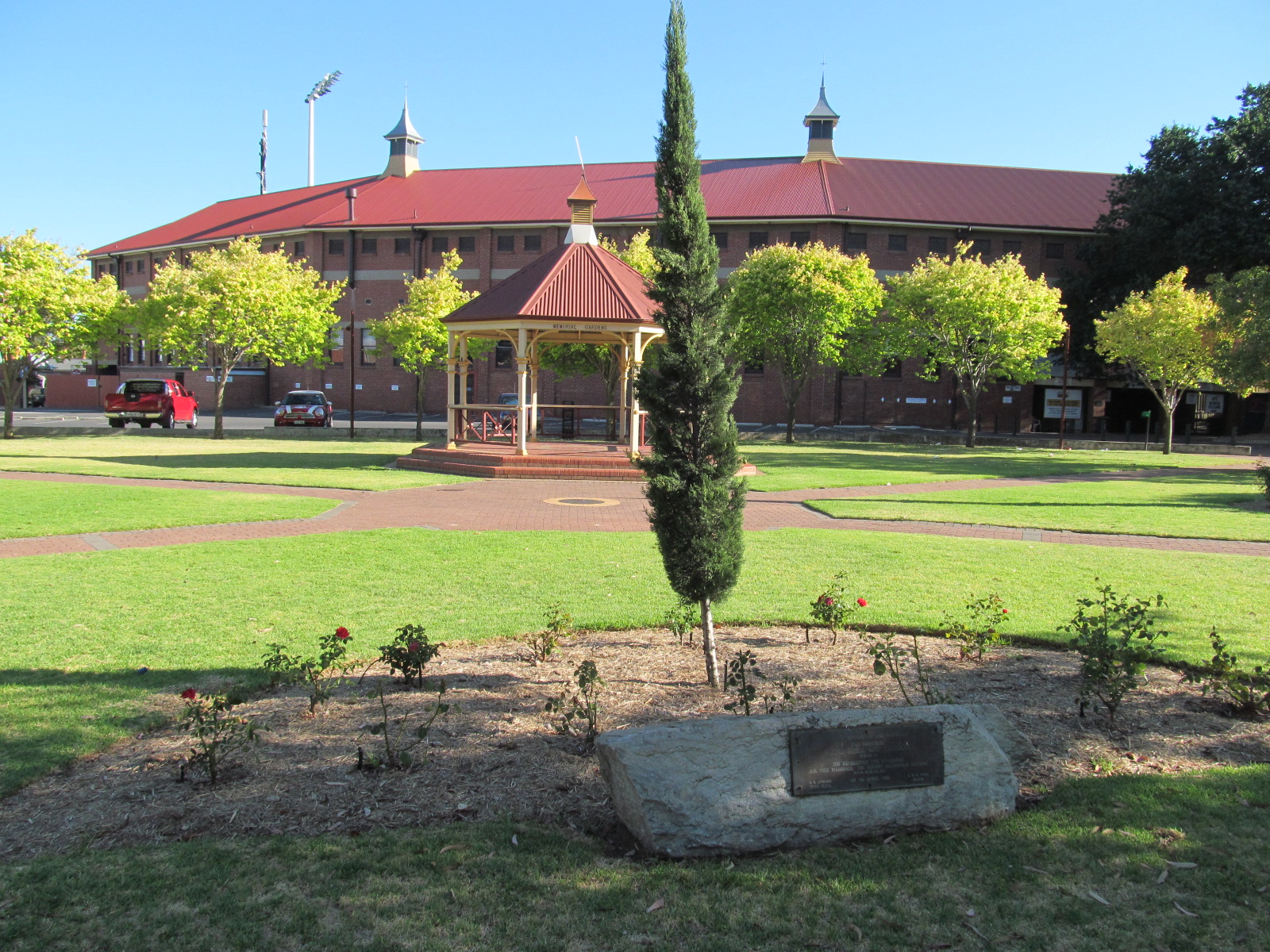
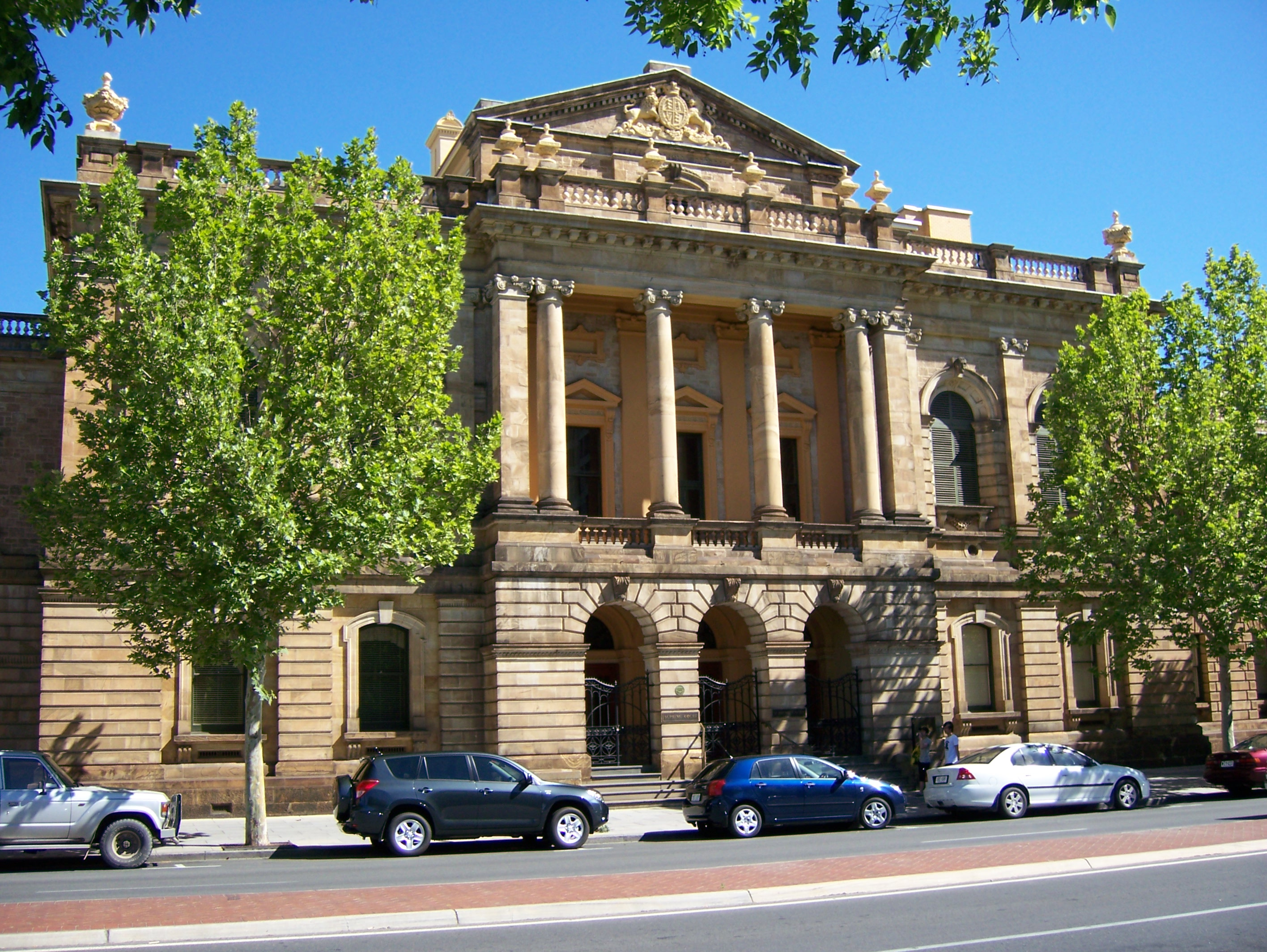
Top Left: On 9 August 1990 it was revealed Norwood had been in discussions with the AFL to join in 1991. However, after seeing the local media response to Port Adelaide's bid they sided with the SANFL. Norwood would again try to gain a licence during 1994 in a merger with Sturt.
Top Right: An injunction was won in the Supreme Court of South Australia preventing Port Adelaide from continuing its discussions with the AFL after 12 August 1990.
Bottom: Cartoon by Michael Atchison for the Adelaide Advertiser on 1 August 1990 equating the tensions between the SANFL and Port Adelaide over the latter's attempt to join the AFL with the then concurrent Iraqi invasion of Kuwait.

During early 1990 the SANFL had decided to wait three years before making any further decision. Frustrated with lack of progress, Port Adelaide were having secret negotiations in the town of Quorn for entry in 1991. A practice match organised by Port Adelaide and Geelong on 25 February at Football Park attracted at over 30,000 spectators and illustrated the potential of a South Australian side in the newly renamed national competition. Around the same time AFL was also seeking Norwood to join the national competition in 1990. However Norwood would eventually side with the SANFL after seeing the media reaction to Port Adelaide's attempts.

"They [the SANFL clubs] are not going to make that decision until they are at the lowest possible ebb. They'd be voting themselves into obscurity [opting for a composite team] in their state."

— Ross Oakley in regards to the other SANFL clubs opposing Port Adelaide's entry

When the knowledge of Port Adelaide Football Club's negotiations to gain an AFL licence were made public, the other SANFL clubs saw it as an act of treachery. Subsequently, the SANFL clubs, led by Glenelg and Norwood, urged Justice Olssen to make an injunction against the bid, which he agreed to. The SANFL promptly created a composite team to beat Port Adelaide's bid. The Adelaide Football Club gained what was very close to being Port Adelaide's licence to the AFL and began playing in 1991. The new Adelaide club would adopt the name "the Crows" after the states inhabitants often used the nickname "Crow-eaters". During this time the SANFL began suing people involved with Port Adelaide, including people volunteering in unpaid positions, with the AFL quickly stepping in to guarantee the protection of the club and associated people. In 2014 during an interview with the Adelaide Advertiser, Ross Oakley revealed that "In desperation to force (the SANFL's) hand...we began dealing directly with two powerhouse clubs of the SANFL, Norwood and Port Adelaide...we were changing the league's name to AFL – and we could not go without a team from Adelaide."

1990 SANFL Grand Final; Last game without AFL in SA.	G	B	Total
Glenelg	13	15	93
Port Adelaide	16	12	108
Venue: Football Park	Crowd: 50,589

"These twenty blokes, everyone who has helped us, are sensational people and all the views that you have read in the press the one thing that really matters is that there will always be a Port Adelaide Football Club."

— George Fiacchi upon accepting the 1990 Jack Oatey Medal for best on ground at the 1990 SANFL Grand Final

"I want to tell you that you want to enjoy this moment for what it is because the good times are well and truly gone. Apart from Jack (John Cahill) and the players there are a couple of individuals out there who are responsible for that and make sure you enjoy tonight because the good times will not happen again."

— Glenelg coach and inaugural Adelaide coach Graham Cornes's address to the Port Adelaide change-rooms post the 1990 SANFL Grand Final

The front runners for the coaching job at the newly created club were both involved in the last SANFL game played in South Australia before the advent of a local AFL team, the 1990 SANFL Grand Final. In that game Port Adelaide, coached by John Cahill defeated Glenelg, coached by Graham Cornes, by 15 points. Graham Cornes ended up being selected to coach Adelaide for the 1991 AFL season. Cornes compiled a club list of the best players from South Australia, with few originating from other states, in what was almost a state side in the first year. Chris McDermott, captain of Glenelg in the 1990 SANFL Grand Final, was designated as the Crows inaugural captain. Despite Port Adelaide being SANFL premiers in 1990, only 5 players from the team became part of the Adelaide squad of 52. Those players being Bruce Abernethy, Simon Tregenza, David Brown, Darren Smith and Scott Hodges, with the last three joining Port Adelaide's inaugural AFL squad in 1997.

In 1992 Port Adelaide played a young Adelaide side in a pre-season match at Football Park on February 1 in what was the first meeting between the two clubs.

=== Second South Australian AFL licence ===
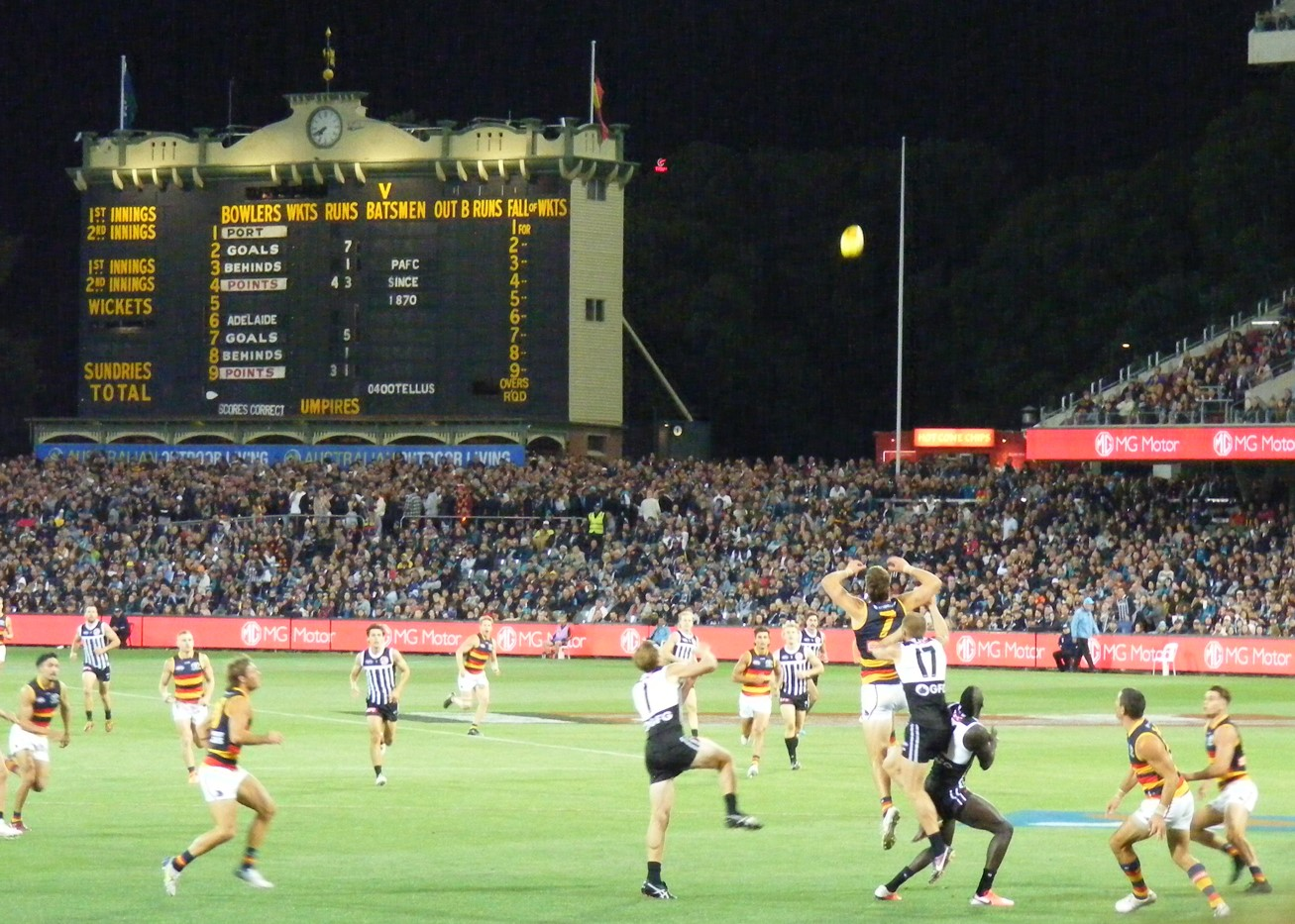
Players competing in a marking contest during Showdown 53

The admission of Adelaide to the AFL had a devastating impact on the league's attendances with the SANFL recording a 45% drop between 1990 and 1993. Port Adelaide defied this trend of falling SANFL attendances recording an increase of 13% from 1990 to 1993.

"I only hope petty jealousies and fears within the S.A.N.F.L. don't short circuit a Port Adelaide proposal which clearly seems better than any other"

— Tony Greenberg, Inside Football, June 1994,

In 1994 the AFL announced that South Australia would receive a licence for a second team based in the state. The major bids competing with Port Adelaide this time around were from merger club proposals in Norwood-Sturt, and Glenelg-South. On 15 June the SANFL handed down a report recommending the second license go to a team formed from the amalgamation of two clubs.

"The sub-licence should be granted to an amalgamation of two SANFL clubs"

— SANFL, Report on the Future Direction of Football in South Australia, 15 June 1994,

On 16 June it was reported in The Age by Stephen Linnell that "the League's preference was for a single, established club to join the league". The final tenders were submitted to the SANFL on 14 September 1994 including Port Adelaide's second application, Norwood–Sturt's merged club bid with the remaining application coming from Woodville–West Torrens.

"In my opinion coming second [not getting the second South Australian AFL licence] means you die"

— Michael Aish, Norwood champion, August 1994,

On 2 October Port Adelaide won the 1994 SANFL Grand Final, its fifth in seven years. On 13 December Port Adelaide won the tender for the second SA license over its various state rivals; however, it was prevented from entering the competition before 1996 as stipulated in the Adelaide license agreement. In 1995 after an SANFL game at Football Park the Adelaide Crows began carrying out a training session which was interrupted by a large horde of Port Adelaide supporters chanting "We're coming to get you". Adelaide coach Robert Shaw was the only Adelaide official to confront the horde. In 1996 Port Adelaide was left to wait again as a vacancy was required in the league.

It was announced on 27 October 1995 that Port Adelaide would be participating in the 1997 AFL season, one season later than initially planned and seven years after the club's first failed bid in 1990.

== Other contributing factors to rivalry ==
Along with the circumstances of the two clubs entries into the national competition are numerous other factors that fuel the rivalry.

=== Lingering resentment ===
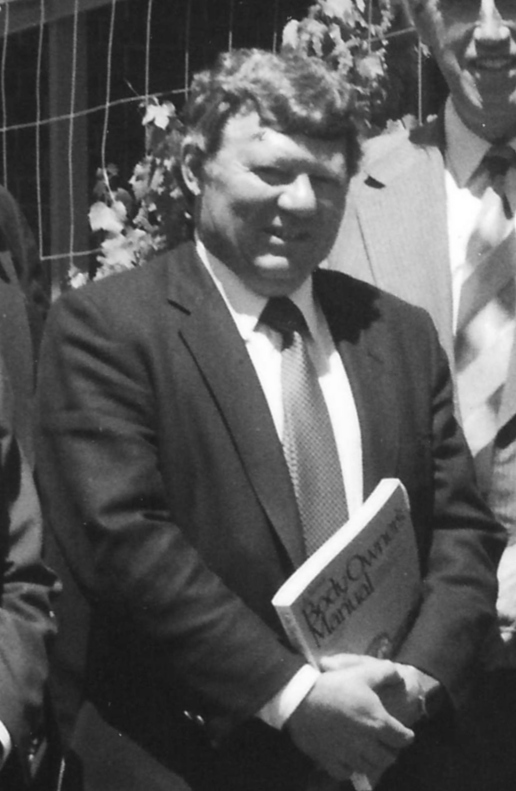
Labor politician and Norwood/Crows supporter Gordon Bilney said he would barrack for the Liberals before barracking for Port Adelaide.

Many supporters of traditionally strong South Australian clubs other than Port Adelaide, such as Norwood, Sturt, Glenelg and North Adelaide, were left frustrated that Port Adelaide were the only SANFL club to make the transition to the AFL.

"I cannot even begin to imagine the joy of seeing Norwood players run on to the MCG in an AFL final – or even a home and away game...We would never again see some of the country's best players slip on our club's jumper while in their prime."

— David Washington, InDaily, 2014

"Victorians say they hate Collingwood in the way that people say they hate snails getting into their garden and eating their lettuces. Let's call a spade a spade. If Port Adelaide were the last team on earth and they were playing a scratch outfit made up of child molesters, axe murderers, failed entrepreneurs and Liberal politicians, I'd barrack for the Liberals...Norwood people especially loathe Port Adelaide with a passion. Can I speak too badly of them? No, I can't."

— Gordon Bilney, The Age, 2002

=== Player recruitment ===
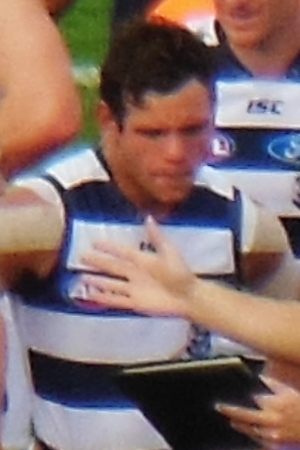
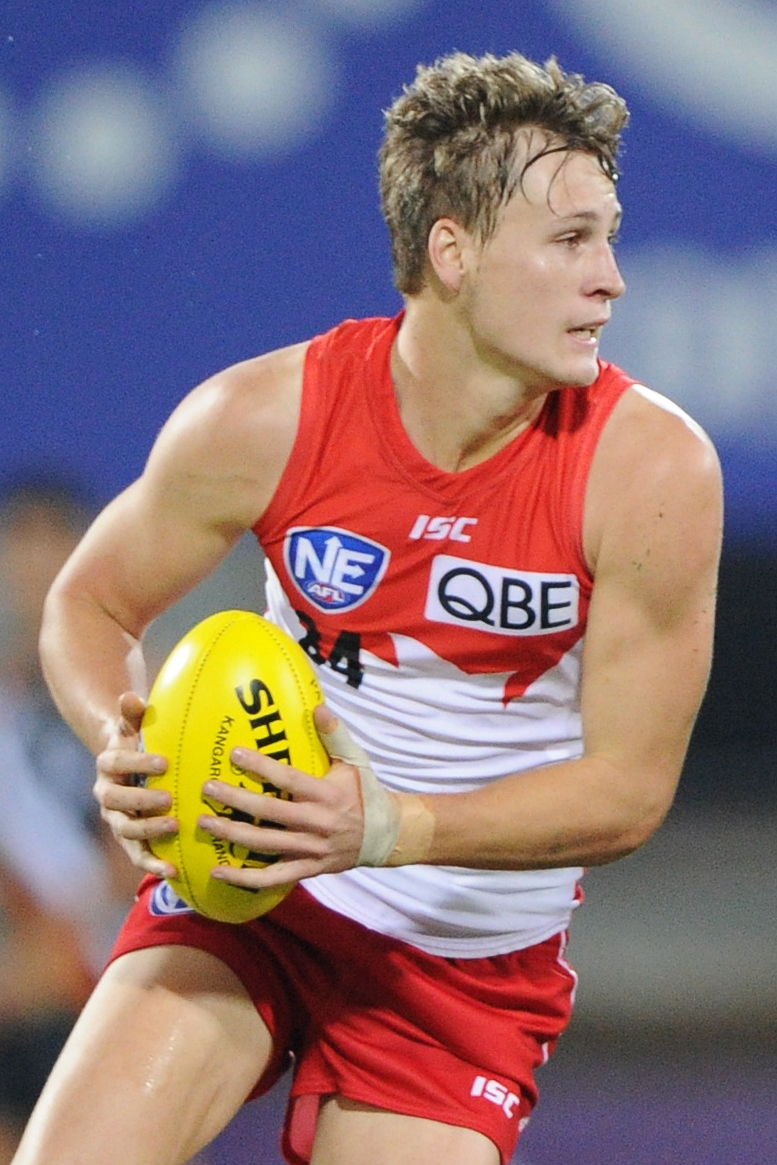
Steven Motlop (left) and Jordan Dawson (right) were the subject of bidding wars between Adelaide and Port Adelaide. Both kicked match winning goals in their first Showdown appearances.

Due to the inherent nature of being the only two South Australian clubs in the competition, when a player seeks to move to the state both clubs often vigorously compete for the players signature. This also applies during the AFL draft when both clubs will jostle for position to gain local talent. Two notable examples of this characteristic were the bidding wars between the two clubs for Steven Motlop and Jordan Dawson. Both players in their first Showdown appearances, Motlop for Port Adelaide after leaving Geelong and Dawson for Adelaide after leaving Sydney, kicked match winning goals for their new clubs.

=== Guernsey issues ===
In 2005 for the AFL's Heritage Round, Adelaide decided to wear an iteration of the South Australian state guernsey, with the 'AFC' monogram instead of the 'SA' monogram, which was originally worn in 1930. During the same match Port Adelaide were blocked by the AFL from wearing the club's Prison Bar guernsey.

"The Adelaide football team and the SA state side are two separate identities – and they should not be confused."

— John Halbert, The Advertiser, 2005

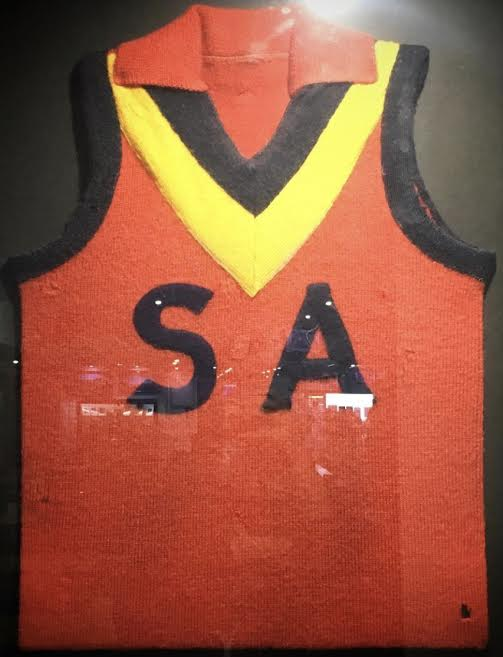
Bob Quinn's 1947 South Australian state football team guernsey is on display at Alberton Oval. The state guernsey was a point of controversy in 2014.

In February 2014, Adelaide announced that they would wear the South Australian state guernsey in the first Showdown at Adelaide Oval. This left Port Adelaide fans particularly aggrieved as many of their greats had worn the South Australia guernsey in the past. Port Adelaide released a statement at the time saying that the state guernsey was "a symbol of South Australian football unification, not division". Others commented that it would be misappropriation to use a State guernsey for a club based competition with players who came from interstate being forced to wear a symbol of South Australia.

My father wore that state jumper to represent SA. So did I. So did many others. That jumper is sacred in my books...I spoke to Eddie McGuire today and suggested Carlton might wear the Big V in a heritage game. You can imagine the reaction. Clubs don't get to wear state jumpers...

— Stephen Kernahan comments on the South Australian state guernsey

Shortly after unveiling the guernsey, Adelaide were denied permission to wear it by the SANFL. Port Adelaide meanwhile were granted permission by the AFL to wear their traditional "Prison Bar" guernsey for the only Showdown in 2020, as part of the club's 150th anniversary celebrations. The club requested it wear the guernsey in all future matches between the teams, which was rejected by Collingwood and the AFL. The club negotiated an agreement with Collingwood to return the guernsey for the 2023 home Showdown match; an agreement which has since been extended to include all future home showdown matches in both the AFL and AFL Women's competitions.

== Notable matches ==
Round 4, 1997
The build up to the inaugural Showdown was described by Malcolm Blight as being akin to a Grand Final. Having won their first match in the AFL against Geelong the week before, a pumped up Port jumped the Crows in the first half and managed to hold on in the final quarter as the Crows mounted a comeback. Port Adelaide eventually defeated Adelaide by 11 points. The game notably also featured a fight between Port's Scott Cummings and Adelaide's Rod Jameson.

The battle of Adelaide has been fought and won. They brought with them a mountain of tradition, there's no denying that. A bonafide club, as distinct from the other. A club forged over many years. What an impact. There are a few chameleons in the crowd. I think a few changed during the course of the game. They found their roots.

— Dennis Cometti immediately after the siren had sounded signifying the end of the game

Dennis Cometti, commentator for the inaugural Showdown, later elaborated on his chameleon comment saying that when Adelaide entered the AFL some Port Adelaide supporters began to follow the new team as it was the only South Australian club competing on the national stage, but six years after their original club attempted to do the same, they reverted to supporting Port Adelaide after they won the first showdown.

Showdown I
Sunday, 20 April (3:10 pm)	Adelaide	def. by	Port Adelaide	Football Park (crowd: 47,256)
1.1 (7); 3.4 (22); 5.5 (35); 11.6 (72)	Q1; Q2; Q3; Final	1.6 (12); 5.10 (40); 9.14 (68); 11.17 (83)	Showdown Medal: Not Awarded; Brownlow Votes: 3 Mead, 2 Breuer, 1 Lade; Television broadcast: Seven Network
7: Modra; 2: Rintoul; 1: Standfield, Vardy	Goals	4: Cummings; 2: Breuer, Downsborough; 1: Burgoyne, Francou, Wilson
Modra, Ricciuto	Best	Mead, Breuer, Lade, Wilson
Jameson	Reports	Cummings

Round 5, 2002

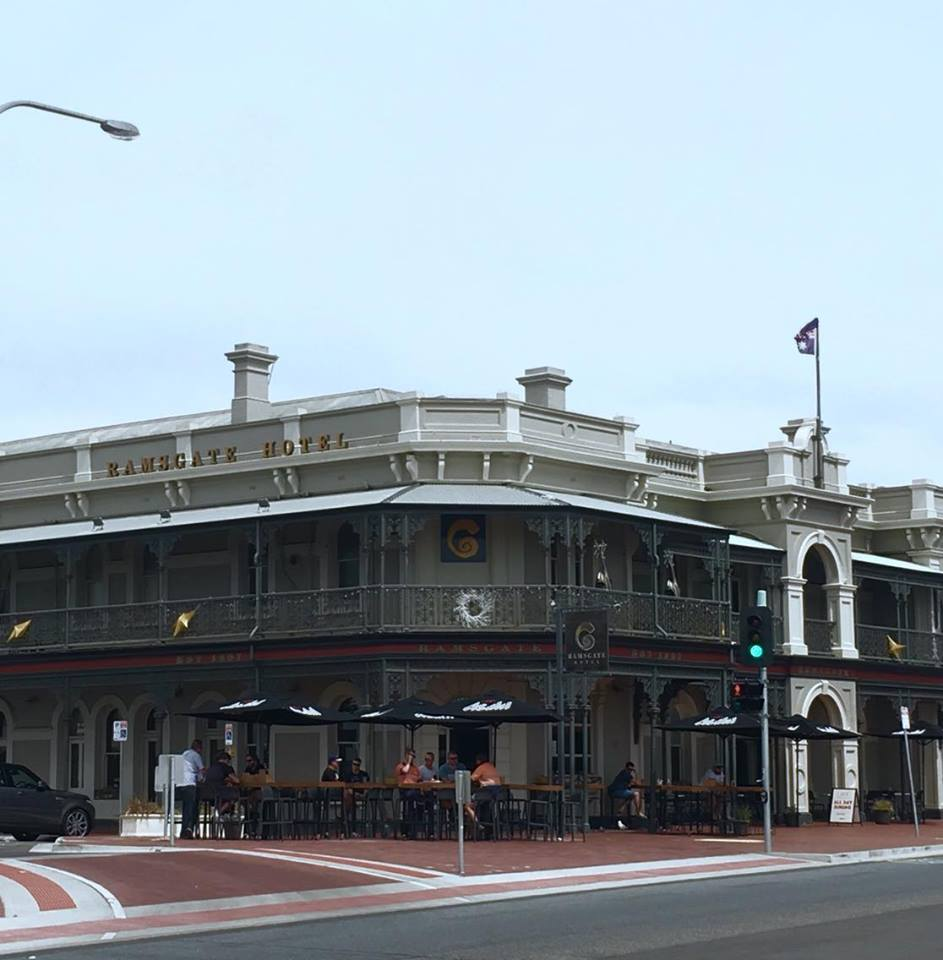
The Ramsgate Hotel was the location of an altercation between the two sides in 2002.

The round 5, 2002 Showdown was the second time in a row Port Adelaide had won by 8 points. After the game about six players from both sides coincidentally came across each other at the Ramsgate Hotel in Henley Beach. During the match Josh Carr had been tagging Mark Ricciuto holding him to only 6 kicks (for comparison Ricciuto averaged 13 over his career). When the groups of players met at the Ramsgate Hotel, the two aforementioned players started an argument, and with the assistance of alcohol, a brawl between the two groups broke out. No one was badly injured. The publicity of this incident resulted in consecutive Showdown crowds in excess of 50,000 at Football Park. John Reid, former head of Adelaide Football Operations, was required (like his Port Adelaide counterpart) by the AFL to provide his players with a formal lecture regarding how the incident was unacceptable which upon completion he famously quipped "And I hope you won the fight!”.

Showdown XI
Saturday, 27 April (7:10pm)	Adelaide	def. by	Port Adelaide	Football Park (crowd: 49,513)
6.1 (37); 9.4 (58); 11.8 (74); 12.10 (82)	Q1; Q2; Q3; Final	3.0 (18); 6.0 (36); 10.3 (63); 14.6 (90)	Showdown Medal: Jarrad Schofield; Brownlow Votes: 3 Schofield, 2 French, 1 Doughty; Television broadcast: Network Ten
2: Stevens, Welsh, Burton, Johncock; 1: Bickley, Bode, Goodwin, Stenglein	Goals	3: C. Cornes; 2: Burgoyne, Wanganeen; 1: Cockatoo-Collins, Guerra, James, Kingsley, Lade, Poulton, Tredrea

Round 7, 2004

Showdown XV is memorable for the magnitude of the upset that Adelaide pulled off and the fact that it ended Port Adelaide's 7 game winning streak in Showdowns. At the start of the game Port Adelaide had won 5 of its first 6 games whilst Adelaide had only managed one. The gambling markets had Adelaide at $5 to win the match, the longest odds offered in any Showdown at the time. Port Adelaide entered the first break with a 6-point lead but Adelaide coach Gary Ayres gave his side a spray and subsequently ran away with the game to cause arguably the biggest upset in Showdown history.

Showdown XV
Saturday, 8 May (7:10 pm)	Port Adelaide	def. by	Adelaide	Football Park (crowd: 44,733)
5.2 (32); 7.3 (45); 9.7 (61); 13.9 (87)	Q1; Q2; Q3; Final	4.2 (26); 11.6 (72); 14.14 (98); 17.17 (119)	Showdown Medal: Mark Ricciuto; Brownlow Votes: 3 Stenglein, 2 Ricciuto, 1 Clarke; Television broadcast: Network Ten
7: Tredrea; 2: Ebert; 1: Burgoyne, Cassisi, Cornes, Brogan	Goals	4: Johncock; 3: Carey, McGregor; 2: Jericho; 1: Edwards, Welsh, Bock, Massie, Stenglein

2005 semi-final

In the 2005 AFL Finals Series, Adelaide and Port Adelaide met in a semi-final, the first time, and thus far only time in their history they had played against each other in a finals game. The stakes of a showdown had never been higher and South Australia experienced an unprecedented high anticipation to the game in the week leading up to the match. The match was known in the buildup as "The Ultimate Showdown". The first half of the game was an intense, defensive contest with the Crows leading 4.7 (31) to 3.6 (24) at the main break. Tempers almost boiled over in the second quarter after Adelaide ruckman Rhett Biglands was stretchered from the ground after a Byron Pickett shirtfront. However Biglands would return in the second half and the incident would eventually be deemed legal. After half time, Adelaide thrashed Port Adelaide outscoring them by 76 points cruising home for an 83-point win, ending Port Adelaide's season. This remains as the only final played between the two sides and the only final the two would ever play at Football Park. 2005 was also the only time one of the clubs had defeated the other side in 3 Showdowns in the same AFL season.

Showdown XIX
Saturday, 10 September (7:00 pm)	Adelaide	def.	Port Adelaide	Football Park (crowd: 50,521)
3.4 (22); 4.7 (31); 12.9 (81); 18.15 (123)	Q1; Q2; Q3; Final	2.1 (13); 3.6 (24); 4.6 (30); 5.10 (40)	Umpires: Michael Vozzo, Brett Allen, Scott McLaren; Showdown Medal: Not Awarded; Television broadcast: Network Ten
4: Welsh; 3: Goodwin, Perrie; 2: McGregor; 1: Hentschel, Edwards, McLeod, Ricciuto, Rutten, Shirley	Goals	1: Mahoney, S.Burgoyne, Pearce, Pettigrew, Wanganeen
Edwards, Goodwin, Ricciuto, Clarke, Rutten, Bassett, Burton, McLeod	Best	C.Cornes, K.Cornes, Montgomery, Wakelin
Johncock (calf), Biglands, Shirley (head knock)	Injuries	Wilson (hamstring)
Nil	Reports	Nil

Round 3, 2008

Showdown 24 is often cited as the most physical meeting of the two clubs. Prior to Showdown 24 Port Adelaide had lost their two opening games of the 2008 AFL season and, coupled with their disastrous 2007 AFL Grand Final, Mark Williams demanded throughout the week at training leading up to the game that his players bring tough and physical brand of football to their next match. Early in the game, and a sign of things to come, Matt Thomas knocked out Nathan Bassett. Not long after Luke Jericho was bruised after a heavy collision with Port Adelaide ruckman Dean Brogan. In the last quarter Adelaide had four injured players on the bench resulting in Port Adelaide gaining all the momentum, kicking the last three goals of the match, with Daniel Motlop bringing the margin to 6 points with two minutes remaining. Despite this Adelaide managed to just hold on, despite losing a significant number of players, and limp to the siren for a win. The final 6-point margin was, at the time, the smallest in Showdown history and the result evened the ledger for the first time since 2000.

"Brogan has put Jericho down!...Gee that is a big hip-and-shoulder. Jericho has not moved."

— Dwayne Russell's call of the incident between Dean Brogan and Luke Jericho.

Showdown XXIV
Sunday, 6 April (4:10 pm)	Adelaide	def.	Port Adelaide	Football Park (crowd: 45,524)
2.3 (15); 4.8 (32); 8.11 (59); 12.13 (85)	Q1; Q2; Q3; Final	2.3 (15); 4.7 (31); 7.12 (54); 11.13 (79)	Showdown Medal: Bernie Vince; Brownlow Votes: 3 Vince, 2 Thompson, 1 Rodan; Television broadcast: Nine Network
3: Douglas; 2: Vince, Goodwin; 1: Edwards, McLeod, Burton, Griffin	Goals	4: S. Burgoyne; 2: C. Cornes; 1: Motlop, Rodan, Boak, Brogan
Vince, Johncock, Edwards, Rutten, Goodwin, Douglas, Thompson	Best	P. Burgoyne, Brogan, C. Cornes, Surjan, Cassisi, S. Burgoyne
Bassett (concussion), Jericho (back), Porplyzia (shoulder), Massie (hamstring)	Injuries	Nil
Nil	Reports	Thomas

Round 19, 2013

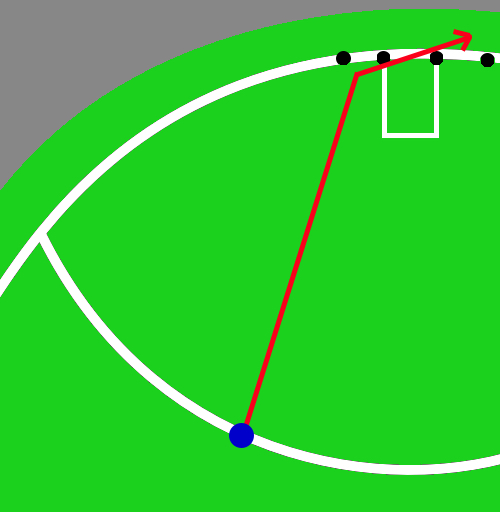
Diagram of Angus Monfries' goal kicked on the 50-metre line that bounced before the left behind line, significantly changed direction right, and crossed the goal line to bring Port Adelaide within 2 points of Adelaide with 87 seconds remaining

In 2013 Port Adelaide beat Adelaide in the final Showdown to be played at Football Park. The game was also memorable for Port Adelaide's late final quarter charge, coming back from 20 points in the last 6 minutes of the game. This included a goal by Angus Monfries from outside 50 that landed just in front of the Port Adelaide's point line, bounced at right angles and went through for a goal. Chad Wingard kicked his fifth goal in the last 28 seconds to hand Port Adelaide the lead and win. Port Adelaide winning this match meant the club had won the first, last and most Showdowns played at Football Park.

"Monfries has kicked a goal, unbelievable! That makes up for Robbie Gray in the first quarter...It's gone at right angles, right angles Tim! I haven't seen anything like that, if Pythagoras is watching, explain that!"

— Dennis Cometti's reaction to Angus Monfries' goal

Showdown XXXV
Sunday, 4 August (2:50 pm)	Adelaide	def. by	Port Adelaide	Football Park (crowd: 43,368)	Report
3.2 (20); 5.6 (36); 12.10 (82); 15.13 (103)	Q1; Q2; Q3; Final	2.1 (13); 9.3 (57); 11.4 (70); 17.5 (107)	Umpires: Stewart, Ryan, Jeffery; Showdown Medal: Chad Wingard; Brownlow Votes: 3 Wingard, 2 Crouch, 1 Dangerfield; Television broadcast: Seven Network, Fox Footy (simulcast)
4: Johnston, Dangerfield; 2: Petrenko, Wright; 1: Grigg, Henderson, Brown	Goals	5: Wingard; 3: Gray, Hartlett; 2: Schulz, Monfries; 1: Butcher, Colquhoun
Crouch, Dangerfield, Johnston, Mackay, Grigg, Vince	Best	Wingard, Hartlett, Gray, Boak, Cornes, Schulz
Nil	Injuries	Stewart (broken wrist)
Nil	Reports	Nil

Round 2, 2014

The round 2, 2014 Showdown on 29 March 2014 saw the first Showdown played at Adelaide Oval along with the first game of Australian rules football at the venue since its extensive redevelopment. Port Adelaide led from the start, with Matthew Lobbe kicking the first goal in an Adelaide Oval Showdown but Adelaide mounted a comeback and claimed the lead briefly in the third. After the halfway mark of the third quarter, Port Adelaide ran away with the game winning by 54 points.

"Port Adelaide will own this moment in history forever!"

— Dwayne Russell's statement as the siren sounded for the first Showdown at Adelaide Oval.

Showdown XXXVI
Saturday, 29 March (4:15 pm)	Port Adelaide	def.	Adelaide	Adelaide Oval (crowd: 50,397)	Report
5.4 (34); 7.8 (50); 12.11 (83); 19.13 (127)	Q1; Q2; Q3; Final	1.1 (7); 5.2 (32); 8.5 (53); 11.7 (73)	Umpires: Fleer, Schmitt, Pannell; Showdown Medal: Hamish Hartlett; Brownlow Votes: 3: Cornes, 2: Wingard. 1: Ebert; Television broadcast: Fox Footy, Seven Network (simulcast); National anthem: Hugh Sheridan
4: Wingard; 3: Schulz; 2: Gray, Wines, White; 1: Ebert, Hartlett, Boak, Butcher, Lobbe, Westhoff	Goals	4: Betts; 3: Grigg; 1: Smith, Podsiadly, Douglas, Kerridge, Johnston
Hartlett, Ebert, Cornes, Wingard, Schulz, Polec	Best	Sloane, Douglas, Betts, Thompson, Smith, Grigg
Polec (cut head)	Injuries	Shaw (wrist), Crouch (lower leg)
Nil	Reports	Nil

Round 16, 2015

The round 16, 2015 Showdown on 19 July 2015 had added significance due to the recent death of Crows senior coach Phil Walsh, who spent ten years as an assistant in two stints with Port Adelaide, including their 2004 premiership. The game lived up to expectation, with the Crows holding on desperately in the last quarter to win by three points, the closest margin in a Showdown. The game was played in front of 54,468, the largest attendance at the venue since the 1973 SANFL Grand Final. Scott Thompson was awarded the one off Phillip Walsh Medal, presented by Walsh's daughter Quinn.

Showdown XXXIX
Sunday, 19 July (2:50 pm)	Port Adelaide	def. by	Adelaide	Adelaide Oval (crowd: 54,468)
3.4 (22); 8.4 (52); 13.6 (84); 17.11 (113)	Q1; Q2; Q3; Final	6.1 (37); 11.3 (69); 18.6 (114); 18.8 (116)	Umpires: Deboy, Schmitt, Ryan; Phil Walsh Medal: Scott Thompson; Brownlow Votes: 3 Thompson, 2 Boak, 1 Jacobs; Television broadcast: Seven Network, Fox Footy (simulcast)
3: Ryder, Wingard, Gray, Schulz; 2: Lobbe, Boak; 1: Monfries	Goals	3: Jenkins, Walker; 2: Cameron, Lynch; 1: Crouch, Laird, Henderson, Martin, Douglas, Knight, Betts, Wright, Thompson
Boak, Wingard, Ryder, Gray, Broadbent, Hartlett	Best	Jacobs, Thompson, Douglas, Walker, Dangerfield, Crouch, Laird, Henderson
Nil	Injuries	Talia (concussion)
Nil	Reports	Nil

Round 8, 2018

The round 8, 2018 Showdown held on 12 May 2018 was played at Adelaide Oval in front of a Port Adelaide home-crowd of 50,967. Despite Adelaide leading by 21 points at half-time, Port Adelaide managed to cut Adelaide's margin back to single figures with 5 minutes left in the third quarter. Robbie Gray kicked 2 goals late (his fourth and fifth of the quarter) to give Port Adelaide the lead at three-quarter time. The final quarter was largely played in Adelaide's forward half but they could not trouble the scoreboard. With less than three minutes to go, the game looked all-but over, but that was not the case. Adelaide managed three goals in little over 2 minutes to regain the lead with 42 seconds on the clock through a Mitch McGovern set shot. One last turn would see off-season Port Adelaide recruit Steven Motlop kick the winning goal with 21 seconds left. The celebration of Port Adelaide coach Ken Hinkley at the conclusion of the game, where he referenced the end of the Adelaide's five Showdown win streak, garnered significant media attention. Robbie Gray claimed a third Showdown Medal for his best on ground display. He managed 6 goals (5 of which in the third quarter).

"Flashpoint! Stevie Motlop, what a time!...He is floating on air now!"

— Anthony Hudson's call as Steven Motlop kicked the game winning goal.

Showdown XLIV
Saturday, 12 May (4:40 pm)	Port Adelaide	def.	Adelaide	Adelaide Oval (crowd: 50,967)
1.3 (9); 4.6 (30); 11.11 (77); 14.11 (95)	Q1; Q2; Q3; Final	4.2 (26); 8.3 (51); 10.5 (65); 14.6 (90)	Umpires: Donlon, Haussen, Meredith; Showdown Medal: Robbie Gray; Brownlow Votes: 3 R. Gray, 2 Atkins, 1 Rockliff; Television broadcast: Fox Footy, Seven Network (simulcast)
6: R.Gray; 2: Wingard, Ryder; 1: S.Gray, Motlop, Boak, Powell-Pepper	Goals	3: Betts; 2: Walker, Ellis-Yolmen, McGovern; 1: Atkins, Jenkins, Douglas, Seedsman, Lynch
Gray, Jonas, Ryder, Rockliff, Powell-Pepper, Polec	Best	Laird, Atkins, Crouch, Talia, Gibbs, Ellis-Yolmen
Nil	Injuries	Walker (glute), Jacobs (back spasms), McGovern (ankle)
Powell-Pepper (2)	Reports	Crouch

Round 20, 2018

Showdown 45 was a tight contest for the entire game apart from the opening where the Crows kicked the first three goals of the match. Second gamer Kane Farrell kicked three goals to close out the first interval with the quarter time scores level and the margin thereafter never again reaching three goals. Late in the final quarter Ollie Wines had the opportunity to seal the game with a set shot from a tight angle but his banana kick was ineffective. Minutes after Wines shot, Josh Jenkins snapped and his score was referred to the goal review umpire to clarify whether it hit the post. The score was quickly ruled a goal by the goal review umpire despite Josh Jenkins calling his teammates to set up for a kick out. He later stated his doubt in a post game interview. Robbie Gray was awarded a record fourth Showdown Medal becoming just the third player, after Graham Johncock and Shaun Burgoyne, to win the honour coming from the losing side. After the match Port Adelaide challenged the AFL Score Review system questioning the short amount of time taken for the review (23 seconds) and the lack of camera angles available to the umpires. The AFL affirmed the decision that it was a goal.

"My grandma raised me not to tell fibs. I think it hit the post...but I'm pretty happy they didn't think so."

— Josh Jenkins during a post-game interview

Showdown XLV
Saturday, 4 August (4:05 pm)	Adelaide	def.	Port Adelaide	Adelaide Oval (crowd: 50,377)
5.3 (33); 7.8 (50); 9.14 (68); 13.18 (96)	Q1; Q2; Q3; Final	5.3 (33); 9.5 (59); 10.9 (69); 14.9 (93)	Umpires: Rosebury, Nicholls, Mitchell; Showdown Medal: Robbie Gray; Brownlow Votes: 3 Gray, 2 Bonner, 1 Rockliff; Television broadcast: Fox Footy, Seven Network (simulcast)
3: Jenkins; 2: Sloane; 1: Walker, Betts, Murphy, Gallucci, Greenwood, Lynch, Doedee, Crouch	Goals	4: Gray, Wingard; 3: Farrell; 2: Boak; 1: Byrne-Jones
Crouch, Gibbs, Jenkins, Sloane, Atkins, Doedee	Best	Gray, Polec, Wingard, Ryder, Byrne-Jones, Boak
Talia (right calf)	Injuries	Nil

Round 3, 2022

Showdown 51 was the first edition of the fixture to be played on Friday night, the AFL's marquee time-slot, although this match partially overlapped with a match between Melbourne and Essendon that was played simultaneously that night and was not broadcast free-to-air nationally. Entering the match both Adelaide and Port Adelaide were winless having lost their first two games. In the lead up to the game Adelaide director Mark Ricciuto publicly noted, regarding his players, that "They can't kick, they can't handball, they can't kick a goal, they've given away free kicks, they really can't do anything worse.” Also during the lead up to the game Kane Cornes called for Todd Marshall to be dropped from Port Adelaide's AFL side. Marshall would go on to kick a career best five goals during the match. Two minutes before the game ended Travis Boak had the opportunity to push the margin to 7 points but missed his shot, registering a behind and leaving the margin at two points. In the last minute of the game a late high contact free kick was paid to Lachlan Murphy against Port Adelaide's Sam Mayes approximately 45m out from goal. Murphy was unable to take the kick and the set shot was given to Jordan Dawson meaning that a kick after the siren would be required for Adelaide to win the game. The kick looked like it was heading straight for a behind until it swung left very late, going through for a goal. Dawson's goal gave the Crows their first win after the siren since Rod Jameson kicked the winner in 1991 against Fitzroy after the siren to win the game. This was also the first time that a Showdown had been decided after the siren.

"...It's coming back!"

— Jason Dunstall's live call of the flight of Jordan Dawson's game winning set shot.

Showdown LI
Friday, 1 April (7:50 pm)	Adelaide	def.	Port Adelaide	Adelaide Oval (crowd: 39,190)
2.1 (13); 7.3 (45); 10.5 (65); 15.6 (96)	Q1; Q2; Q3; Final	5.2 (32); 9.7 (61); 11.12 (78); 13.14 (92)	Showdown Medal: Jordan Dawson; Brownlow Votes: 3 Dawson, 2 Boak, 1 Marshall; Television broadcast: Fox Footy, Seven Network (simulcast)
Himmelberg, Gollant – 4 Dawson – 2 Schoenberg, Sholl, Rachele, McHenry, Cook – 1	Goals	5 – Marshall; 2 – Mayes, Georgiades; 1 – Motlop, Drew, Lycett, Frederick
Dawson, Schoenberg, O'Brien, Himmelberg	Best	Boak, Burton, Wines, Amon
Murphy (neck)	Injuries	Skinner (ankle)

Round 8, 2026
Showdown 59 was played in Round 8 of the 2026 AFL season at Adelaide Oval on 1 May 2026. The match was attended by 53,045 spectators and was the first Showdown to be decided by a single point. Adelaide led for much of the match and held a lead of as much as 21 points early in the final quarter before Port Adelaide mounted a comeback. With 46 seconds remaining, Port Adelaide's Joe Berry kicked a goal to give his side a five-point lead. Following the next centre bounce, Adelaide's Izak Rankine won a free kick and moved the ball forward, where teammate Dan Curtin handballed to Brayden Cook. Cook kicked a goal from approximately 45 metres out with around 10 seconds remaining, giving Adelaide a one point lead. Port Adelaide was unable to score again, with Adelaide winning 11.10 (76) to 11.9 (75). Adelaide midfielder Sam Berry was awarded the Showdown Medal after recording 29 disposals and 19 tackles. The victory gave Adelaide a 31–28 lead in the overall Showdown win–loss record.

“Here's Cook! For the win!”

— Dwayne Russell's commentary when Brayden Cook kicked the winning goal.,

Showdown LIX
Friday, 1 May (7:40 pm)	Adelaide	def.	Port Adelaide	Adelaide Oval (crowd: 53,045)
1.2 (8); 3.4 (22); 8.9 (57); 11.10 (76)	Q1; Q2; Q3; Final	3.2 (20); 4.4 (28); 7.7 (49); 11.9 (75)	Showdown Medal: Sam Berry; Television broadcast: Fox Footy, Seven Network (simulcast)
Keays – 3 Rachele, Murray – 2 Cook, Pedlar, Rankine, Thilthorpe – 1	Goals	3 – Georgiades; 2 – Berry, Durdin; 1 – Butters, Visentini, Whitlock, Wines
Milera, Berry, Rachele, Murray, Rankine, Cook, Peatling	Best	Aliir, Georgiades, Horne-Francis, Butters, Bergman, Wines
Walker (hamstring), Butts (adductor)	Injuries

== Results ==
=== AFL Showdown results ===
The two clubs sometimes meet in preseason fixtures, such as the first meeting between the two clubs in 1992; however, these are not official Showdowns and do not contribute to the official statistics of the fixture. While the AFL draw is not a complete double round robin it is designed each year to include two Showdowns in recognition of its significance and gate drawing power. For the 2020 season only, there was only one Showdown due to the premiership season being shortened to 17 rounds due to the COVID-19 pandemic.

	Year	Date	Timeslot	Rd	Home Team	Score	Away Team	Score	Ground	Crowd	Result/Winner	M	HRT	H2H
1	1997	20/4	Sun 3:10	4	Adelaide	11.6 (72)	Port Adelaide	11.17 (83)	Football Park	47,256	Port Adelaide	11	L	+1
2	1997	10/8	Sun 3:10	19	Port Adelaide	9.4 (58)	Adelaide	9.11 (65)	Football Park	45,498	Adelaide	7	W	
3	1998	19/4	Sun 2:10	4	Port Adelaide	11.7 (73)	Adelaide	8.16 (64)	Football Park	41,476	Port Adelaide	9	L	+1
4	1998	9/8	Sun 3:20	19	Adelaide	22.12 (144)	Port Adelaide	10.10 (70)	Football Park	46,405	Adelaide	74	W	
5	1999	2/5	Sun 2:10	6	Adelaide	18.7 (115)	Port Adelaide	12.15 (87)	Football Park	45,585	Adelaide	28	W	+1
6	1999	22/8	Sun 2:10	21	Port Adelaide	13.14 (92)	Adelaide	9.14 (68)	Football Park	42,669	Port Adelaide	24	W	
7	2000	23/4	Sun 1:40	7	Port Adelaide	13.13 (91)	Adelaide	14.14 (98)	Football Park	41,173	Adelaide	7	W	+1
8	2000	6/8	Sun 2:10	22	Adelaide	14.8 (92)	Port Adelaide	20.19 (139)	Football Park	42,659	Port Adelaide	47	L	
9	2001	15/4	Sun 1:40	3	Adelaide	13.10 (88)	Port Adelaide	23.15 (153)	Football Park	40,296	Port Adelaide	65	W	+1
10	2001	5/8	Sun 1:40	18	Port Adelaide	16.11 (107)	Adelaide	15.9 (99)	Football Park	49,846	Port Adelaide	8	W	+2
11	2002	27/4	Sat 7:10	5	Adelaide	12.10 (82)	Port Adelaide	14.6 (90)	Football Park	49,513	Port Adelaide	8	L	+3
12	2002	18/8	Sun 2:10	20	Port Adelaide	12.12 (84)	Adelaide	11.10 (76)	Football Park	50,275	Port Adelaide	8	W	+4
13	2003	26/4	Sat 7:10	5	Adelaide	9.12 (66)	Port Adelaide	12.6 (78)	Football Park	51,140	Port Adelaide	12	L	+5
14	2003	31/8	Sun 1:10	22	Port Adelaide	14.10 (94)	Adelaide	12.6 (78)	Football Park	48,131	Port Adelaide	16	W	+6
15	2004	8/5	Sat 7:10	7	Port Adelaide	13.9 (87)	Adelaide	17.17 (119)	Football Park	44,733	Adelaide	32	L	+5
16	2004	29/8	Sun 12:40	22	Adelaide	9.6 (60)	Port Adelaide	12.13 (85)	Football Park	45,473	Port Adelaide	25	W	+6
17	2005	10/4	Sun 12:40	3	Adelaide	18.16 (124)	Port Adelaide	8.8 (56)	Football Park	44,807	Adelaide	68	W	+5
18	2005	13/8	Sat 7:10	20	Port Adelaide	12.9 (81)	Adelaide	13.10 (88)	Football Park	45,199	Adelaide	7	W	+4
19	2005	10/9	Sat 7:00	SF	Adelaide	18.15 (123)	Port Adelaide	5.10 (40)	Football Park	50,521	Adelaide	83	W	+3
20	2006	6/5	Sat 7:10	6	Adelaide	15.13 (103)	Port Adelaide	8.5 (53)	Football Park	42,723	Adelaide	50	W	+2
21	2006	27/8	Sun 12:40	21	Port Adelaide	14.11 (95)	Adelaide	11.15 (81)	Football Park	41,549	Port Adelaide	14	L	+3
22	2007	14/4	Sat 2:40	3	Port Adelaide	8.15 (63)	Adelaide	13.9 (87)	Football Park	36,959	Adelaide	24	L	+2
23	2007	4/8	Sat 7:10	18	Adelaide	9.19 (73)	Port Adelaide	10.5 (65)	Football Park	42,335	Adelaide	8	L	+1
24	2008	6/4	Sun 4:10	3	Adelaide	12.13 (85)	Port Adelaide	11.13 (79)	Football Park	45,524	Adelaide	6	W	
25	2008	20/7	Sun 2:40	16	Port Adelaide	13.14 (92)	Adelaide	11.14 (80)	Football Park	31,662	Port Adelaide	12	L	+1
26	2009	2/5	Sat 7:10	6	Port Adelaide	15.15 (105)	Adelaide	12.7 (79)	Football Park	41,558	Port Adelaide	26	W	+2
27	2009	26/7	Sun 4:10	17	Adelaide	19.18 (132)	Port Adelaide	9.8 (62)	Football Park	46,859	Adelaide	70	W	+1
28	2010	1/5	Sat 2:40	6	Adelaide	10.14 (74)	Port Adelaide	14.13 (97)	Football Park	40,371	Port Adelaide	23	W	+2
29	2010	25/7	Sun 4:10	17	Port Adelaide	13.10 (88)	Adelaide	9.15 (69)	Football Park	36,788	Port Adelaide	19	L	+3
30	2011	16/4	Sat 7:10	4	Port Adelaide	14.14 (98)	Adelaide	9.12 (66)	Football Park	33,143	Port Adelaide	32	L	+4
31	2011	31/7	Sun 4:10	19	Adelaide	16.15 (111)	Port Adelaide	11.13 (79)	Football Park	40,586	Adelaide	32	W	+3
32	2012	29/4	Sun 4:10	5	Adelaide	16.14 (110)	Port Adelaide	14.7 (91)	Football Park	41,649	Adelaide	19	W	+2
33	2012	7/7	Sat 7:10	15	Port Adelaide	8.10 (58)	Adelaide	17.14 (116)	Football Park	34,829	Adelaide	58	W	+1
34	2013	14/4	Sun 4:10	3	Port Adelaide	17.16 (118)	Adelaide	16.13 (109)	Football Park	40,707	Port Adelaide	9	W	+2
35	2013	4/8	Sun 2:50	19	Adelaide	15.13 (103)	Port Adelaide	17.5 (107)	Football Park	43,368	Port Adelaide	4	W	+3
36	2014	29/3	Sat 4:15	2	Port Adelaide	19.13 (127)	Adelaide	11.7 (73)	Adelaide Oval	50,397	Port Adelaide	54	W	+4
37	2014	29/6	Sun 3:40	15	Adelaide	14.15 (99)	Port Adelaide	10.16 (76)	Adelaide Oval	50,552	Adelaide	23	L	+3
38	2015	3/5	Sun 4:10	5	Adelaide	13.13 (91)	Port Adelaide	18.7 (115)	Adelaide Oval	49,735	Port Adelaide	24	L	+4
39	2015	19/7	Sun 2:50	16	Port Adelaide	17.11 (113)	Adelaide	18.8 (116)	Adelaide Oval	53,518	Adelaide	3	W	+3
40	2016	2/4	Sat 1:15	2	Adelaide	22.12 (144)	Port Adelaide	11.20 (86)	Adelaide Oval	50,555	Adelaide	58	L	+2
41	2016	20/8	Sat 7:10	22	Port Adelaide	14.10 (94)	Adelaide	15.19 (109)	Adelaide Oval	49,541	Adelaide	15	W	+1
42	2017	8/4	Sat 7:10	3	Port Adelaide	12.11 (83)	Adelaide	15.10 (100)	Adelaide Oval	53,698	Adelaide	17	L	
43	2017	6/8	Sun 4:10	20	Adelaide	18.22 (130)	Port Adelaide	7.4 (46)	Adelaide Oval	45,028	Adelaide	84	W	+1
44	2018	12/5	Sat 4:40	8	Port Adelaide	14.11 (95)	Adelaide	14.6 (90)	Adelaide Oval	50,967	Port Adelaide	5	L	
45	2018	4/8	Sat 4:05	20	Adelaide	13.18 (96)	Port Adelaide	14.9 (93)	Adelaide Oval	50,377	Adelaide	3	L	+1
46	2019	11/5	Sat 7:10	8	Port Adelaide	9.14 (68)	Adelaide	13.10 (88)	Adelaide Oval	49,675	Adelaide	20	W	+2
47	2019	6/7	Sat 4:05	16	Adelaide	5.14 (44)	Port Adelaide	15.11 (101)	Adelaide Oval	50,544	Port Adelaide	57	L	+1
48	2020	13/6	Sat 7:10	2	Port Adelaide	17.8 (110)	Adelaide	5.5 (35)	Adelaide Oval	2,240 (Note: Crowd numbers impacted by COVID-19 restrictions)	Port Adelaide	75	W	
49	2021	8/5	Sat 7:10	8	Port Adelaide	12.15 (87)	Adelaide	5.8 (38)	Adelaide Oval	43,069	Port Adelaide	49	W	+1
50	2021	7/8	Sat 7:10	21	Adelaide	7.9 (51)	Port Adelaide	7.13 (55)	Adelaide Oval	14,376	Port Adelaide	4	W	+2
51	2022	1/4	Fri 7:50	3	Adelaide	15.6 (96)	Port Adelaide	13.14 (92)	Adelaide Oval	39,190	Adelaide	4	W	+1
52	2022	20/8	Sat 7:00	23	Port Adelaide	16.15 (111)	Adelaide	7.13 (55)	Adelaide Oval	50,090	Port Adelaide	56	W	+2
53	2023	1/4	Sat 7:00	3	Port Adelaide	13.8 (86)	Adelaide	18.9 (117)	Adelaide Oval	48,962	Adelaide	31	L	+1
54	2023	29/7	Sat 7:10	20	Adelaide	16.16 (112)	Port Adelaide	9.11 (65)	Adelaide Oval	50,023	Adelaide	47	L	
55	2024	2/5	Thu 7:00	8	Adelaide	12.6 (78)	Port Adelaide	5.18 (48)	Adelaide Oval	52,106	Adelaide	30	L	+1
56	2024	17/8	Sat 7:00	23	Port Adelaide	11.14 (80)	Adelaide	8.10 (58)	Adelaide Oval	52,459	Port Adelaide	22	W	
57	2025	10/5	Sat 7:40	9	Port Adelaide	12.12 (84)	Adelaide	13.11 (89)	Adelaide Oval	53,117	Adelaide	5	W	+1
58	2025	26/7	Sat 7:40	20	Adelaide	20.13 (133)	Port Adelaide	5.5 (35)	Adelaide Oval	46,018	Adelaide	98	W	+2
59	2026	1/5	Fri 7:40	8	Adelaide	11.10 (76)	Port Adelaide	11.9 (75)	Adelaide Oval	53,045	Adelaide	1	L	+3
60	2026	27/6	Sat 7:05	16	Port Adelaide	13.19 (97)	Adelaide	11.5 (71)	Adelaide Oval	50,087	Port Adelaide	26	L	+2

=== AFLW Showdown results ===
	Year	Date	Timeslot	Rd	Home Team	Score	Away Team	Score	Ground	Crowd	Result/Winner	M	HRT	H2H
1	2022 (S7)	30/9	Fri 7:30	6	Port Adelaide	0.3 (3)	Adelaide	8.15 (63)	Adelaide Oval	20,652	Adelaide	60	W	+1
2	2023	2/9	Sat 2:35	1	Adelaide	8.10 (58)	Port Adelaide	4.4 (28)	Norwood Oval	8,722	Adelaide	30	-	+2
3	2024	31/8	Sat 7:15	1	Port Adelaide	5.5 (35)	Adelaide	7.7 (49)	Alberton Oval	5,194	Adelaide	14	-	+3
4	2025	24/10	Fri 6:45	11	Adelaide	6.9 (45)	Port Adelaide	7.10 (52)	Norwood Oval	5,434	Port Adelaide	7	L	+2
5	2026	23/10	Fri 6:45	8	Port Adelaide	5.6 (36)	Adelaide	2.10 (22)	Alberton Oval	5,441	Port Adelaide	14	L	+1

=== SANFL Showdown results ===
	Year	Date	Timeslot	Rd	Home Team	Score	Away Team	Score	Ground	Crowd	Result/Winner	M	HRT	H2H
1	2014	5/4	Sun 2:10	5	Adelaide	13.9 (87)	Port Adelaide	20.12 (132)	Clare Oval	5,312	Port Adelaide	45	W	+1
2	2014	26/7	Sat 2:10	14	Port Adelaide	15.16 (106)	Adelaide	7.12 (54)	Alberton Oval	6,196	Port Adelaide	52	-	+2
3	2015	17/5	Sat 2:10	7	Adelaide	15.9 (99)	Port Adelaide	20.14 (134)	Balaklava Oval	2,034	Port Adelaide	35	-	+3
4	2015	28/6	Sat 2:10	11	Port Adelaide	10.9 (69)	Adelaide	13.11 (89)	Alberton Oval	4,864	Adelaide	20	-	+2
5	2016	2/4	Sun 1:40	2	Adelaide	15.14 (104)	Port Adelaide	10.14 (74)	Mannum Oval	2,323	Adelaide	30	-	+1
6	2016	31/7	Sat 2:10	18	Port Adelaide	12.7 (79)	Adelaide	16.8 (104)	Alberton Oval	2,289	Adelaide	25	-	
7	2017	29/4	Sun 1:10	4	Adelaide	8.11 (59)	Port Adelaide	14.10 (90)	Woodville Oval	1,348	Port Adelaide	31	W	+1
8	2017	8/7	Sat 2:40	12	Port Adelaide	17.10 (112)	Adelaide	8.6 (54)	Alberton Oval	2,235	Port Adelaide	58	W	+2
9	2018	31/3	Sat 2:40	1	Port Adelaide	19.14 (128)	Adelaide	4.9 (33)	Alberton Oval	2,451	Port Adelaide	95	-	+3
10	2018	15/7	Sun 1:40	14	Adelaide	17.14 (116)	Port Adelaide	8.12 (60)	Kadina Oval	—N/a	Adelaide	56	L	+2
11	2019	26/7	Sat 2:10	7	Port Adelaide	16.9 (105)	Adelaide	18.13 (121)	Alberton Oval	6,196	Adelaide	52	W	+1
12	2019	13/7	Sat 2:40	13	Adelaide	10.9 (69)	Port Adelaide	15.9 (99)	Port Pirie Oval	3,460	Port Adelaide	30	L	+2
13	2019	31/8	Sat 7:05	QF	Port Adelaide	12.13 (85)	Adelaide	8.7 (55)	Adelaide Oval	12,473	Port Adelaide	30	L	+3
	2020	No Showdowns due to COVID-19. Adelaide and Port Adelaide did not take part in the premiership season.												
14	2021	8/5	Sat 4:05	6	Port Adelaide	13.9 (87)	Adelaide	10.13 (73)	Adelaide Oval	1,582	Port Adelaide	14	W	+4
15	2021	7/8	Sat 4:05	16	Adelaide	13.4 (82)	Port Adelaide	10.9 (69)	Adelaide Oval	—N/a	Adelaide	13	L	+3
16	2022	4/1	Sat 4:10	1	Adelaide	18.15 (123)	Port Adelaide	8.13 (61)	Adelaide Oval	—N/a	Adelaide	62	-	+2
17	2022	20/8	Sat 3:20	19	Port Adelaide	11.9 (75)	Adelaide	10.12 (72)	Adelaide Oval	—N/a	Port Adelaide	3	W	+3
18	2023	1/4	Sat 3:10	1	Port Adelaide	6.10 (46)	Adelaide	19.10 (124)	Adelaide Oval	—N/a	Adelaide	78	-	+2
19	2023	7/7	Sun 2:10	15	Adelaide	14.8 (96)	Port Adelaide	2.15 (27)	Adelaide Oval	—N/a	Adelaide	69	W	+1
20	2024	2/5	Sat 3:20	5	Adelaide	16.7 (103)	Port Adelaide	8.13 (61)	Adelaide Oval	—N/a	Adelaide	42	W	
21	2024	17/8	Sat 3:20	18	Port Adelaide	6.11 (47)	Adelaide	19.10 (124)	Adelaide Oval	—N/a	Adelaide	77	W	+1
22	2025	10/5	Sat 3:10	6	Port Adelaide	5.13 (43)	Adelaide	13.10 (88)	Adelaide Oval	—N/a	Adelaide	45	W	+2
23	2025	27/7	Sat 4:00	15	Adelaide	12.22 (94)	Port Adelaide	12.7 (79)	Adelaide Oval	—N/a	Adelaide	15	W	+3
24	2026	1/5	Fri 4:30	5	Adelaide	15.8 (98)	Port Adelaide	18.10 (118)	Adelaide Oval	—N/a	Port Adelaide	20	L	+2
25	2026	27/6	Sat 3:10	12	Port Adelaide	12.5 (77)	Adelaide	19.15 (129)	Adelaide Oval	—N/a	Adelaide	52	W	+3

== Showdown Medal ==
The Showdown Medal is the medal awarded to the player adjudged best on ground in the Showdown AFL match.

== Shared history ==
=== Shared players ===
Below is a list of players who have played a senior game of football representing both Adelaide and Port Adelaide.
Only two male players, Matthew Bode and Brett Chalmers, and two female players, Sarah Goodwin and Ashleigh Woodland, have appeared in Showdowns for both clubs.

==== Men ====
#	Player	Adelaide AFL: 1991–present	Port Adelaide AFL: 1997–present	Port Adelaide SANFL: pre 1997
1	Darren Smith	1991–1992		1984–1990, 1991–1992*, 1993–1996
1	Simon Tregenza	1991–1998		1988–1990, 1991–1996*
3	Scott Hodges	1991–1993		1987–1990, 1991–1993*, 1996–1997
4	Bruce Abernethy	1991–1992		1979–1981, 1987–1990, 1991–1992*
4	Danny Hughes	1991		1981–1983, 1991*, 1992–1993
6	David Brown	1991–1996		1987–1990, 1991–1996*, 1997–1998
7	Greg Anderson	1993–1996		1983–1987, 1995–1996
8	Brett Chalmers	1994–1997	1998–1999	1991–1992, 1994–1997, 1998–1999
9	Andrew McLeod	1995–2010		1994, 1995–1996
10	Troy Bond	1996–1999		1991–1993
11	Ian Downsborough	1998–1999	1997	
12	Bryan Beinke	1999–2002		1993–1996
13	Matthew Bode	2001–2007	1998–2000	
14	Brad Symes	2008–2012	2004–2007	
15	Billy Frampton	2020–2022	2018–2019	
16	Rory Atkins	2013–2020	2025	
*Years underlined indicate periods where players were on Adelaide's AFL list but played for Port Adelaide between 1991 and 1996 when the club's senior team was still in the SANFL. Where names are bold, the player participated in a Showdown for both clubs.

==== Women ====
#	Player	Adelaide AFLW: 2017–present	Port Adelaide AFLW: 2022 (S7)–present
1	Ange Foley	2017–2022^{S6}	2022^{S7}–2024
1	Justine Mules-Robinson	2017–2022^{S7}	2022^{S7}–2026
1	Erin Phillips	2017–2022^{S6}	2022^{S7}–2023
5	Sarah Goodwin	2023–present	2022^{S7}
5	Ashleigh Woodland	2021–2022^{S7}	2023–present
6	Jasmine Simmons	2022^{S6}–2022^{S7}	2023
7	Hannah Ewings	2025–present	2022^{S7}–2024
*Where names are bold, the player participated in a Showdown for both clubs.

=== AFL trades ===
Below is a list of AFL sanctioned trades between the two clubs. Only five trades have ever been orchestrated between the two clubs. There were no trades for ten years between 2008 and 2018.

#	Year	Player	Traded from	Traded to
1	1997	Ian Downsborough	Port Adelaide	Adelaide
1	1997	Brett Chalmers	Adelaide	Port Adelaide
2	2000	Matthew Bode	Port Adelaide	Adelaide
2	2000	Pick No. 12 (Shaun Burgoyne)	Adelaide	Port Adelaide
3	2007	Brad Symes	Port Adelaide	Adelaide
3	2007	Pick No. 28 (Marlon Motlop)	Adelaide	Port Adelaide
4	2019	Billy Frampton	Port Adelaide	Adelaide
4	2019	2020 4th Round Pick (Melbourne)	Adelaide	Port Adelaide
5	2026	Luke Pedlar	Adelaide	Port Adelaide
5	2026	Pick No. 34	Adelaide	Port Adelaide
5	2026	Pick No. 32	Port Adelaide	Adelaide
5	2026	2027 4th Round Pick (Richmond)	Port Adelaide	Adelaide

== Attendances and timeslots ==
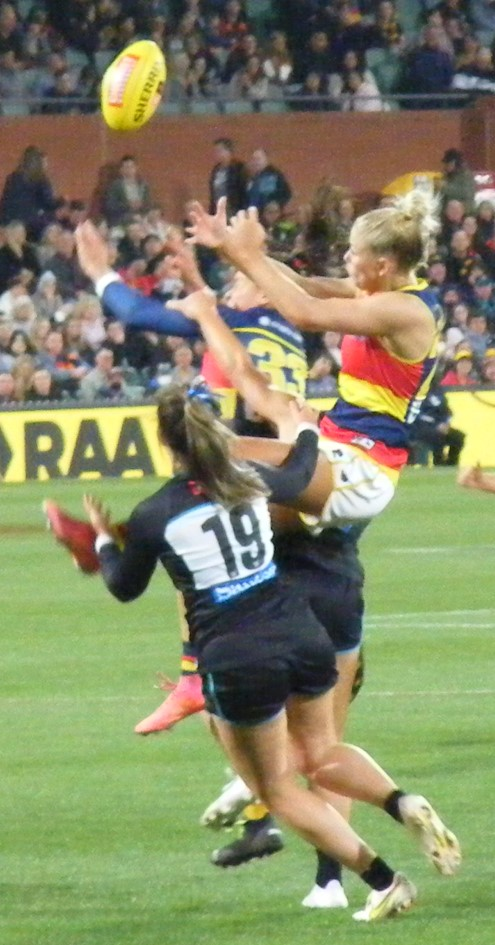
The inaugural AFL Women's Showdown attracted 20,625 spectators. Pictured is Ashleigh Woodland attempting a spectacular mark during that match.

The Showdown has the highest average attendances of all intrastate derby matches.

In the 45 Showdowns to 2018, a total of 2,017,918 people have attended the matches: an average attendance per match of 44,893.

The record attendance in a Showdown was 53,698 in Showdown XLII (round 3, 2017, a Port Adelaide home match). The lowest attendance was 2,240 in Showdown XLVIII (round 2, 2020, a Port Adelaide home match), due to the impacts of the COVID-19 pandemic at the time. Showdown XXV (Round 16, 2008, a Port Adelaide home match), which drew a crowd of 31,662, is the lowest attended Showdown that was not impacted by COVID-19.

A total of 1,053,674 people have attended Adelaide's 23 home Showdowns (including the 2005 Semi Final), an average of 45,812. Their attendances have ranged from 40,296 (Showdown IX) to 51,140 (Showdown XIII).

A total of 966,484 people have attended Port Adelaide's 23 home Showdowns, an average of 42,021. Their attendances range from 2,240 (Showdown XLVIII) to 53,698 (Showdown XLII).

=== Minor round fixturing ===
Due to the length of the AFL premiership season requiring five double up matches and the commercial strength of the Showdown there have always been two Showdowns fixtured for the minor round, with the exception of 2020 which saw only one Showdown scheduled due to the COVID-19 pandemic. Generally the gap between the two Showdown fixtures is maximised to preserve the game's reverence.

Duration between fixtures
Within minor round	Shortest turnaround	8 rounds	2019
Within minor round	Longest turnaround	20 rounds	2016, 2022
Between seasons	Shortest turnaround	231 days	2016–2017
Between seasons	Longest turnaround	343 days	2019–2020

=== Highest attendances ===
#	Crowd	Year	Date	Rd	Hosting club	Ground
42	53,698	2017	8/4	3	Port Adelaide	Adelaide Oval
39	53,518	2015	19/7	16	Port Adelaide	Adelaide Oval
57	53,117	2025	10/5	9	Port Adelaide	Adelaide Oval
59	53,045	2026	1/5	8	Adelaide	Adelaide Oval
56	52,459	2024	17/8	23	Port Adelaide	Adelaide Oval
55	52,106	2024	2/5	8	Adelaide	Adelaide Oval
13	51,140	2003	26/4	5	Adelaide	Football Park
44	50,967	2018	12/5	8	Port Adelaide	Adelaide Oval
40	50,555	2016	2/4	2	Adelaide	Adelaide Oval
47	50,554	2019	6/7	16	Adelaide	Adelaide Oval
37	50,552	2014	29/6	15	Adelaide	Adelaide Oval
19	50,521	2005	10/9	SF	Adelaide	Football Park

== Club records ==
=== Highest score ===
Highest score in a Showdown.

==== Showdown (men) ====
#	Club	Year	Round	Goals	Behinds	Total
1	Port Adelaide	2001	3	23	15	153
2	Adelaide	1998	19	22	12	144
2	Adelaide	2016	2	22	12	144

==== Showdown (women) ====
#	Club	Year	Round	Goals	Behinds	Total
1	Adelaide	2022	6	8	15	63
2	Port Adelaide	2025	11	7	10	52

=== Lowest score ===
Lowest score for each club in all Showdowns.

==== Showdown (men) ====
#	Club	Year	Round	Goals	Behinds	Total
1	Adelaide	2020	2	5	5	35
2	Port Adelaide	2025	20	5	5	35

==== Showdown (women) ====
#	Club	Year	Round	Goals	Behinds	Total
1	Port Adelaide	2022	6	0	3	3
2	Adelaide	2026	11	2	10	22

=== Greatest winning margins ===
Greatest winning margin for each club in the Showdown.

==== Showdown (men) ====
#	Club	Year	Round	Winning score	Losing Score	Margin
1	Adelaide	2025	20	20.13 (133)	5.5 (35)	98
2	Port Adelaide	2020	2	17.8 (110)	5.5 (35)	75

==== Showdown (women) ====
#	Club	Year	Round	Winning score	Losing Score	Margin
1	Adelaide	2022	6	8.15 (63)	0.3 (3)	60
2	Port Adelaide	2026	8	5.6 (36)	2.10 (22)	14

=== Smallest winning margins ===
Smallest winning margin for each club in the Showdown.

==== Showdown (men) ====
#	Club	Year	Round	Winning score	Losing Score	Margin
1	Adelaide	2026	8	11.10 (76)	11.9 (75)	1
2	Port Adelaide	2013	19	17.5 (107)	15.13 (103)	4
2	Port Adelaide	2021	21	7.13 (55)	7.9 (51)	4
Updated to Showdown LIX (59).

==== Showdown (women) ====
#	Club	Year	Round	Winning score	Losing Score	Margin
1	Port Adelaide	2025	11	7.10 (52)	6.9 (45)	7
2	Adelaide	2024	1	7.7 (49)	5.5 (35)	14

=== Winning streak ===
==== Showdown (men) ====
#	Club	Winning Streak	Showdowns
1	Port Adelaide	7	8–14
2	Adelaide	5	39–43

==== Showdown (women) ====
#	Club	Winning Streak	Showdowns
1	Adelaide	3	1–3
2	Port Adelaide	2	4-current

=== Clean sweeps ===
Seasons when one club has won all Showdown fixtures. There was only one AFL Showdown in 2020 due to the COVID-19 pandemic. There has yet to be more than one AFLW Showdown in a season.

#	Club	Clean Sweeps	Total
1	Adelaide	2005, 2007, 2012, 2016, 2017, 2023, 2025	7
2	Port Adelaide	2001, 2002, 2003, 2010, 2013, 2021	6
Updated to Showdown LVIII (58).

Includes the 2005 semi-final. This is the only (as of 2025) time that either side has won all three Showdowns in the one season (including finals).

=== Brownlow votes ===
#	Club	Total votes	Unique Players
1	Port Adelaide	176 votes	40
2	Adelaide	166 votes	40
Updated to Showdown LVIII (58).

== Player records ==
=== Games played ===
Showdown appearances (Men)
Travis Boak has played the most Showdowns (33) of any player.
#	Player	Club	Showdowns
1	Travis Boak	Port Adelaide	33
2	Kane Cornes	Port Adelaide	27
2	Andrew McLeod	Adelaide	27
2	Taylor Walker	Adelaide	27
5	Justin Westhoff	Port Adelaide	25
5	Scott Thompson	Adelaide	25
Updated to Showdown LX (60).

Showdown appearances (Women)
#	Player	Club	Showdowns
1	Chelsea Biddell	Adelaide	5
1	Brooke Tonon	Adelaide	5
1	Eloise Jones	Adelaide	5
1	Ebony Marinoff	Adelaide	5
1	Madison Newman	Adelaide	5
1	Ashleigh Woodland	Adelaide & Port Adelaide	5
1	Sarah Goodwin	Port Adelaide & Adelaide	5
1	Ella Boag	Port Adelaide	5
1	Amelie Borg	Port Adelaide	5
1	Abbey Dowrick	Port Adelaide	5
1	Cheyenne Hammond	Port Adelaide	5
1	Ebony O'Dea	Port Adelaide	5
1	Justine Mules-Robinson	Port Adelaide	5
1	Updated to AFLW Showdown V (5).		

=== Goalkickers ===
==== Most goals kicked in one Showdown ====
Most goals in one Showdown (Men)
#	Player	Club	Fixture	Goals
1	Tony Modra	Adelaide	1997 R4	7
1	Peter Vardy	Adelaide	1998 R19	7
1	Warren Tredrea	Port Adelaide	2004 R7	7
1	Taylor Walker	Adelaide	2023 R20	7
5	Gavin Wanganeen	Port Adelaide	2001 R3	6
5	Taylor Walker	Adelaide	2012 R5	6
5	Ricky Henderson	Adelaide	2012 R15	6
5	Tom Lynch	Adelaide	2016 R2	6
5	Robbie Gray	Port Adelaide	2018 R8	6
Updated to Showdown LX (60).

Most goals in one Showdown (Women)
#	Player	Club	Fixture	Goals
1	Chelsea Randall	Adelaide	2022	3
2	Yvonne Bonner	Adelaide	2023	2
2	Ashleigh Woodland	Port Adelaide	2023	2
2	Jessica Allan	Adelaide	2024	2
2	Eloise Jones	Adelaide	2024	2
2	Grace Kelly	Adelaide	2025	2
2	Gemma Houghton	Port Adelaide	2025	2
2	Indy Tahau	Port Adelaide	2025	2
Updated to AFLW Showdown V (5).

==== Most Showdown career goals ====
Most career Showdown goals (Men)
#	Player	Club	Goals	Games
1	Taylor Walker	Adelaide	56	27
2	Robbie Gray	Port Adelaide	40	22
3	Eddie Betts	Adelaide	35	12
4	Justin Westhoff	Port Adelaide	32	25
5	Warren Tredrea	Port Adelaide	30	23
Updated to Showdown LX (60).

Most career Showdown goals (Women)
#	Player	Club	Goals	Games
1	Gemma Houghton	Port Adelaide	5	4
2	Ashleigh Woodland	Adelaide & Port Adelaide	4	5
3	Eloise Jones	Adelaide	4	5
4	Abbey Dowrick	Port Adelaide	3	5
4	Caitlin Gould	Adelaide	3	4
4	Chelsea Randall	Adelaide	3	3
4	Anne Hatchard	Adelaide	3	4
Updated to AFLW Showdown V (5).

=== Career Brownlow votes ===
#	Player	Club	Votes	Games
1	Josh Francou	Port Adelaide	14	15
1	Travis Boak	Port Adelaide	14	28
3	Robbie Gray	Port Adelaide	12	22
4	Mark Ricciuto	Adelaide	11	18
5	Gavin Wanganeen	Port Adelaide	10	17
5	Andrew McLeod	Adelaide	10	27
5	Patrick Dangerfield	Adelaide	10	13
5	Sam Jacobs	Adelaide	10	15
5	Zak Butters	Port Adelaide	10	13
Updated to Showdown LX (60).

#	Player	Club	Votes	Games
1	Abbey Dowrick	Port Adelaide	6	4
1	Anne Hatchard	Adelaide	6	4
1	Ebony Marinoff	Adelaide	6	4
3	Niamh Kelly	Adelaide	3	3
3	Chelsea Randall	Adelaide	3	3
5	Matilda Scholz	Port Adelaide	2	3
Updated to AFLW Showdown IV (4).

=== Disposals ===
==== Most career Showdown disposals ====
Most career Showdown disposals (Men)
#	Player	Club	Disposals	Games
1	Travis Boak	Port Adelaide	745	33
2	Scott Thompson	Adelaide	614	25
3	Ollie Wines	Port Adelaide	601	24
4	Rory Laird	Adelaide	594	24
5	Kane Cornes	Port Adelaide	580	27
Updated to Showdown LX (60).

Most career Showdown disposals (Women)
#	Player	Club	Disposals	Games
1	Ebony Marinoff	Adelaide	133	5
2	Anne Hatchard	Adelaide	101	4
3	Abbey Dowrick	Port Adelaide	88	5
4	Madison Newman	Adelaide	73	4
5	Sarah Goodwin	Port Adelaide & Adelaide	68	5
Updated to AFLW Showdown V (5).

==== Most disposals in one Showdown ====
Most disposals in one Showdown (Men)
#	Player	Club	Fixture	Disposals
1	Zak Butters	Port Adelaide	2024 R23	42
2	Mark Ricciuto	Adelaide	2000 R7	41
2	Peter Burgoyne	Port Adelaide	2008 R3	41
2	Tom Rockliff	Port Adelaide	2019 R8	41
5	Simon Goodwin	Adelaide	2007 R18	39
5	Patrick Dangerfield	Adelaide	2012 R5	39
Updated to Showdown LX (60).

Most disposals in one Showdown (Women)
#	Player	Club	Fixture	Disposals
1	Ebony Marinoff	Adelaide	2025	34
2	Ebony Marinoff	Adelaide	2023	32
3	Anne Hatchard	Adelaide	2023	30
4	Ebony Marinoff	Adelaide	2024	29
5	Niamh Kelly	Adelaide	2023	28
Updated to AFLW Showdown V (5).

=== Hitouts ===
==== Most career Showdown hitouts ====
#	Player	Club	Hitouts	Games
1	Sam Jacobs	Adelaide	536	15
2	Reilly O'Brien	Adelaide	482	13
3	Brendon Lade	Port Adelaide	347	22
4	Matthew Lobbe	Port Adelaide	288	11
5	Dean Brogan	Port Adelaide	253	16
Updated to Showdown LX (60).

#	Player	Club	Hitouts	Games
1	Matilda Scholz	Port Adelaide	75	4
2	Jessica Allan	Adelaide	61	3
3	Montana McKinnon	Adelaide	33	2
4	Olivia Levicki	Port Adelaide	31	3
5	Caitlin Gould	Adelaide	24	4
Updated to AFLW Showdown V (5).

==== Most hitouts in one Showdown ====
Most hitouts in one Showdown (Men)
#	Player	Club	Fixture	Hitouts
1	Sam Jacobs	Adelaide	2012 R15	61
2	Sam Jacobs	Adelaide	2015 R16	51
3	Reilly O'Brien	Adelaide	2022 R23	50
4	Paddy Ryder	Port Adelaide	2017 R3	48
5	Reilly O'Brien	Adelaide	2022 R3	45
5	Jordon Sweet	Port Adelaide	2024 R23	45
5	Reilly O'Brien	Adelaide	2025 R20	45
5	Jordon Sweet	Port Adelaide	2025 R20	45
Updated to Showdown LX (60).

Most hitouts in one Showdown (Women)
#	Player	Club	Fixture	Hitouts
1	Jessica Allan	Adelaide	2024	30
3	Matilda Scholz	Port Adelaide	2025	23
3	Montana McKinnon	Adelaide	2022	21
4	Olivia Levicki	Port Adelaide	2024	20
5	Jessica Allan	Adelaide	2026	19
5	Matilda Scholz	Port Adelaide	2024	19
5	Matilda Scholz	Port Adelaide	2026	19
Updated to AFLW Showdown V (5).

=== Clearances ===
==== Most career Showdown clearances ====
Most career Showdown clearances (Men)
#	Player	Club	Clearances	Games
1	Travis Boak	Port Adelaide	141	33
2	Ollie Wines	Port Adelaide	136	24
3	Scott Thompson	Adelaide	124	25
4	Robbie Gray	Port Adelaide	100	22
5	Matt Crouch	Adelaide	88	14
Updated to Showdown LX (60).

Most career Showdown clearances (Women)
#	Player	Club	Clearances	Games
1	Ebony Marinoff	Adelaide	22	5
2	Abbey Dowrick	Port Adelaide	21	5
3	Anne Hatchard	Adelaide	13	4
4	Jessica Allan	Adelaide	10	2
5	Chelsea Randall	Adelaide	9	3
Updated to AFLW Showdown V (5).

==== Most clearances in one Showdown ====
Most clearances in one Showdown (Men)
#	Player	Club	Fixture	Clearances
1	Patrick Dangerfield	Adelaide	2015 R5	14
2	Josh Francou	Port Adelaide	1999 R21	13
2	Patrick Dangerfield	Adelaide	2015 R16	13
2	Scott Thompson	Adelaide	2015 R16	13
2	Zak Butters	Port Adelaide	2026 R16	13
Updated to Showdown LX (60).

Most clearances in one Showdown (Women)
#	Player	Club	Fixture	Clearances
1	Abbey Dowrick	Port Adelaide	2026	11
2	Ebony Marinoff	Adelaide	2023	7
2	Chelsea Randall	Adelaide	2022	7
2	Jessica Allan	Adelaide	2024	7
2	Danielle Ponter	Adelaide	2024	7
2	Sarah Goodwin	Adelaide	2025	7
2	Niamh Kelly	Adelaide	2026	7
Updated to Showdown V (5).

=== Contested possessions ===
==== Most career Showdown contested possessions ====
Most career Showdown contested possessions (Men)
#	Player	Club	Contested possessions	Games
1	Travis Boak	Port Adelaide	324	33
2	Ollie Wines	Port Adelaide	288	24
3	Scott Thompson	Adelaide	267	25
4	Rory Laird	Adelaide	235	24
5	Robbie Gray	Port Adelaide	228	22
Updated to Showdown LX (60).

Most career Showdown contested possessions (Women)
#	Player	Club	Contested possessions	Games
1	Abbey Dowrick	Port Adelaide	60	5
2	Ebony Marinoff	Adelaide	57	5
3	Anne Hatchard	Adelaide	54	4
4	Ashleigh Woodland	Adelaide & Port Adelaide	39	5
5	Matilda Scholz	Port Adelaide	32	3
Updated to Showdown V (5).

==== Most contested possessions in one Showdown ====
Most contested possessions in one Showdown (Men)
#	Player	Club	Fixture	Contested possessions
1	Rory Sloane	Adelaide	2017 R3	24
2
2	Zak Butters	Port Adelaide	2026 R16	23
2	Tom Rockliff	Port Adelaide	2019 R8	23
4	Robbie Gray	Port Adelaide	2016 R2	22
4	Scott Thompson	Adelaide	2015 R16	22
4	Patrick Dangerfield	Adelaide	2014 R15	22
Updated to Showdown LX (60).

Most contested possessions in one Showdown (Women)
#	Player	Club	Fixture	Contested possessions
1	Abbey Dowrick	Port Adelaide	2026	22
2	Anne Hatchard	Adelaide	2025	16
3	Anne Hatchard	Adelaide	2022	15
3	Ebony Marinoff	Adelaide	2024	15
3	Niamh Kelly	Adelaide	2026	15
Updated to Showdown V (5).

=== Contested Marks ===
==== Most career Showdown contested marks ====
Most career Showdown contested marks (Men)
#	Player	Club	Contested Marks	Games
1	Chad Cornes	Port Adelaide	42	24
2	Warren Tredrea	Port Adelaide	36	23
3	Taylor Walker	Adelaide	35	27
4	Justin Westhoff	Port Adelaide	32	25
4	Charlie Dixon	Port Adelaide	32	14
Updated to Showdown LX (60).

Most career Showdown contested marks (Women)
#	Player	Club	Contested Marks	Games
1	Anne Hatchard	Adelaide	7	3
2	Matilda Scholz	Port Adelaide	6	4
3	Chelsea Biddell	Adelaide	4	4
3	Chelsea Randall	Adelaide	4	4
3	Gemma Houghton	Port Adelaide	4	4
Updated to AFLW Showdown V (5).

==== Most contested marks in one Showdown ====
#	Player	Club	Fixture	Contested Marks
1	Chad Cornes	Port Adelaide	2004 R7	6
1	Kurt Tippett	Adelaide	2011 R4	6
1	Justin Westhoff	Port Adelaide	2011 R4	6
1	Charlie Dixon	Port Adelaide	2023 R20	6
5	Trent Henschel	Adelaide	2005 SF	5
5	Taylor Walker	Adelaide	2017 R20	5
5	Aliir Aliir	Port Adelaide	2021 R21	5
5	Riley Thilthorpe	Adelaide	2022 R23	5
5	Riley Thilthorpe	Adelaide	2025 R9	5
Updated to Showdown LX (60).

#	Player	Club	Fixture	Contested Marks
1	Anne Hatchard	Adelaide	2022	6
2	10 occurrences			2
Updated to AFLW Showdown V (5).

=== Tackles ===
==== Most career Showdown tackles ====
Most career Showdown tackles (Men)
#	Player	Club	Tackles	Games
1	Scott Thompson	Adelaide	141	25
2	Travis Boak	Port Adelaide	140	33
3	Ollie Wines	Port Adelaide	128	23
4	Rory Sloane	Adelaide	110	20
5	Domenic Cassisi	Port Adelaide	109	20
Updated to Showdown LX (60).

Most career Showdown tackles (Women)
#	Player	Club	Tackles	Games
1	Ebony Marinoff	Adelaide	52	5
2	Abbey Dowrick	Port Adelaide	34	5
3	Anne Hatchard	Adelaide	25	4
4	Teah Charlton	Adelaide	22	4
5	Justine Mules-Robinson	Port Adelaide	21	5
Updated to AFLW Showdown V (5).

==== Most tackles in one Showdown ====
Most tackles in one Showdown (Men)
#	Player	Club	Fixture	Tackles
1	Sam Berry	Adelaide	2026 R8	19
2	Domenic Cassisi	Port Adelaide	2008 R16	13
2	Hugh Greenwood	Adelaide	2017 R20	13
2	Rory Sloane	Adelaide	2019 R8	13
2	Rory Laird	Adelaide	2023 R20	13
Updated to Showdown LX (60).

Most tackles in one Showdown (Women)
#	Player	Club	Fixture	Tackles
1	Ebony Marinoff	Adelaide	2025	15
1	Ebony Marinoff	Adelaide	2026	15
2	Anne Hatchard	Adelaide	2024	12
3	Ebony Marinoff	Adelaide	2022	11
5	Ebony Marinoff	Adelaide	2024	9
5	Jasmine Sowden	Port Adelaide	2025	9
5	Maria Moloney	Port Adelaide	2026	9
5	Piper Window	Port Adelaide	2026	9
Updated to AFLW Showdown V (5).

=== Player winning record ===
Showdown players ranked by win percentage (minimum 10 Showdowns).

Player winning percentage (Men)
#	Player	Club	Win	Loss	Win %
1	Josh Carr	Port Adelaide	10	0	100.0
2	Jarrad Schofield	Port Adelaide	8	2	80.0
3	Wayne Milera	Adelaide	8	3	72.7
4	Matt Crouch	Adelaide	10	4	71.4
5	Nick Stevens	Port Adelaide	7	3	70.0
Updated to Showdown LIX (59).

Player winning percentage (Women)
#	Player	Club	Win	Loss	Win %
Nil

== Coaching records ==
Showdown coaches are ranked by total wins followed by win percentage.

Former Port Adelaide coach Ken Hinkley currently holds the record for most Showdown matches coached.

=== Showdown coaching record ===
Showdown coaching record (men)
Current Adelaide coach Matthew Nicks (left) and current Port Adelaide coach Josh Carr (right)
#	Coach	Club	Win	Loss	Win %
1	Mark Williams	Port Adelaide	13	11	54.2
2	Ken Hinkley	Port Adelaide	11	15	42.3
3	Neil Craig	Adelaide	8	7	53.3
4	Matthew Nicks	Adelaide	8	6	57.1
5	Don Pyke	Adelaide	6	2	75.0
6	Malcolm Blight	Adelaide	3	3	50.0
6	Brenton Sanderson	Adelaide	3	3	50.0
8	John Cahill	Port Adelaide	2	2	50.0
9	Matthew Primus	Port Adelaide	2	3	40.0
10	Gary Ayres	Adelaide	2	7	22.2
11	Scott Camporeale	Adelaide	1	0	100
11	Mark Bickley	Adelaide	1	0	100
13	Josh Carr	Port Adelaide	1	1	50.0
14	Phil Walsh	Adelaide	0	1	0.0
Updated to Showdown LVIII (58).

Showdown coaching record (women)
Current Adelaide Women's coach Ryan Davis (left) and Port Adelaide Women's coach Glenn Strachan (right)
#	Coach	Club	Win	Loss	Win %
1	Matthew Clarke	Adelaide	3	1	75.0
2	Glenn Strachan	Port Adelaide	1	0	100.0
3	Lauren Arnell	Port Adelaide	1	3	25.0
4	Ryan Davis	Adelaide	0	1	0.0
Updated to AFLW Showdown IV (4).

== Naming rights sponsors ==
Since the first Showdown in 1997 the fixture has always had a naming rights sponsor.

=== West End (1997–2007) ===
The first naming rights sponsor was the South Australian Brewing Company (SABC) who utilised the fixture to promote West End Draught. SABC was responsible for the coining of the 'Showdown' name for the rivalry.

=== Balfours (2008–2017) ===
Balfours, a South Australian wholesale bakery, became the naming rights sponsor for the Showdown in 2008. As part of their efforts in promoting the game Balfours began, and continue, to produce donuts in the colors of the two competing teams.

=== Variety (2018–present) ===
Variety, a charity for disadvantaged children, became the current naming rights sponsor for the Showdown in 2018.

== Spin-offs ==
=== Cricket ===
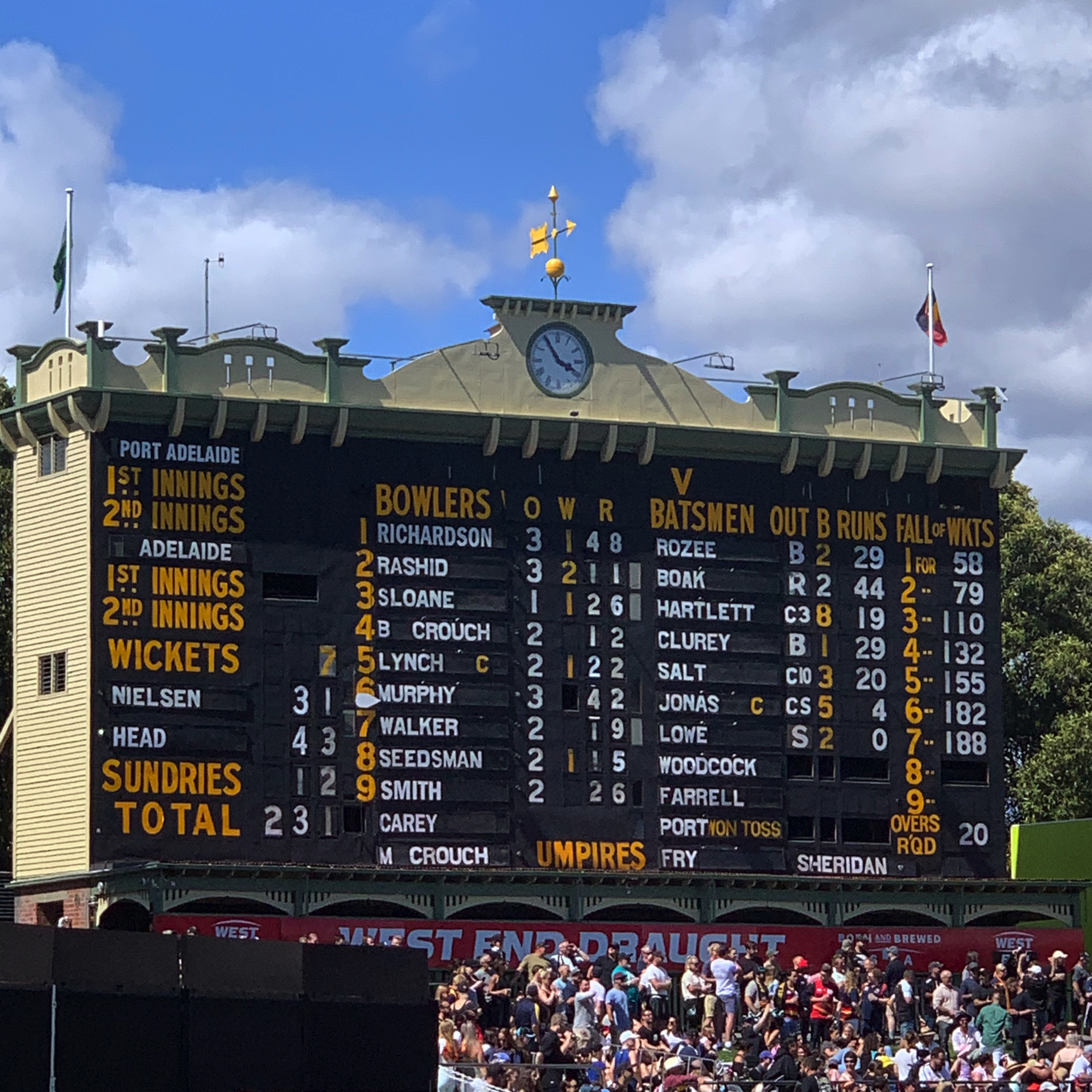
Adelaide Oval scoreboard during the Bushfire T20 Showdown

Two Showdowns have taken place as Twenty20 cricket matches doubling as charity fundraisers for bushfire relief. In 2009, the two clubs played at Football Park what was dubbed as SA Footy's Bushfire Bash For Cash. In the aftermath of the 2019–20 Australian bushfire season which severely impacted Kangaroo Island and parts of the Adelaide Hills, the two clubs played another such game, this time at Adelaide Oval. Dubbed the Bushfire T20 Showdown, it also included members of the Adelaide Strikers of the Big Bash League participating including Australian internationals Alex Carey, who was also previously W. Sydney's TAC Cup captain, and Strikers captain Travis Head. The game proved a success with 34,219 spectators collectively raising $1,015,239 by the end of the match for the South Australian Bushfire Appeal. Seven Network broadcast the match with commentators including James Brayshaw, Greg Blewett, Mark Soderstrom and Jason Gillespie.

Sunday, 2 February 2020
Scorecard

Port Adelaide	v	Adelaide
231/7 (20 overs); Travis Boak 44 (23); Hamish Hartlett 2/9 (2 overs)		217/8 (20 overs); Tom Lynch 38 (24); Rashid Khan 2/11 (3 overs)

Port Adelaide won by 14 runs
Adelaide Oval, Adelaide

- Port Adelaide won the toss and elected to bat.

=== Slowdown ===
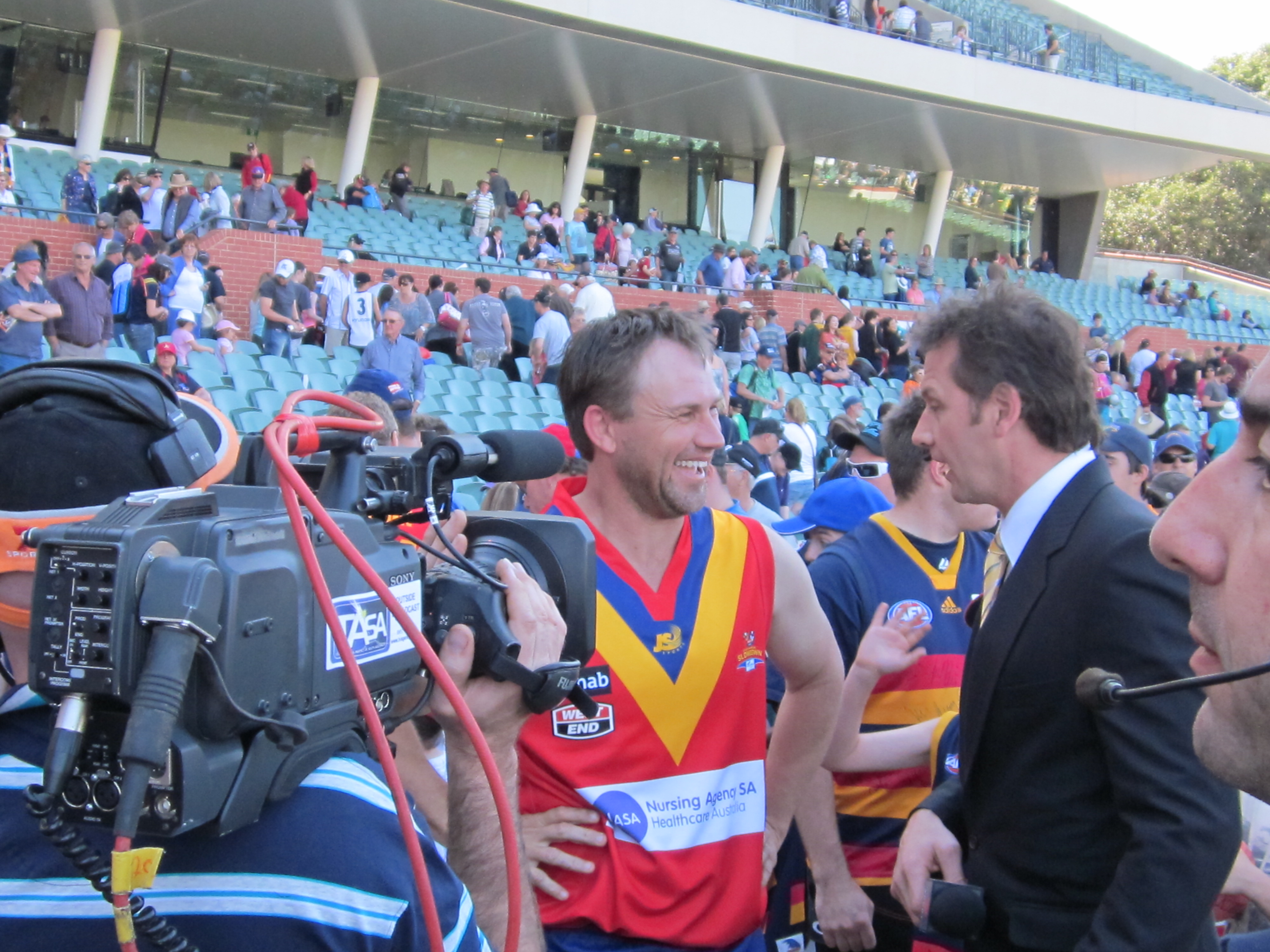
Tony Modra being interviewed after the 2011 Slowdown

A charity spin off of the Showdown also included an annual 'Slowdown' that raised money for various charities. Slowdown's often featured retired Adelaide, Port Adelaide and SANFL players along with local celebrities.

== See also ==
- QClash
- Sydney Derby (Battle Of The Bridge)
- Western Derby
