= Luke Jericho =

Australian rules footballer

Personal information
- Born: 18 October 1984 (age 42)
- Original team: West Adelaide (SANFL)
- Debut: Round 4, 2004, Adelaide vs. St Kilda, at AAMI Stadium
- Height: 190 cm (6 ft 3 in)
- Weight: 86 kg (190 lb)

Playing career^{1}
Years	Club	Games (Goals)
2004–2008	Adelaide	33 (31)
- ^{1} Playing statistics correct to the end of 2008.

Luke Jericho (born 18 October 1984) is an Australian rules footballer, formerly for Adelaide in the AFL. He was recruited as a second round pick in the 2002 AFL draft, selection number 32 overall. He made his debut in 2004, against St Kilda, and kicked a goal on debut. He ended up playing 15 games for the year, and scoring 10 goals. Jericho now plays for Norwood in the SANFL.

In 2005, he played just the 5 games, scoring 5 goals, including a four-goal haul against Essendon in Round 11. In the 2006 season, he could not break into the team, and opted to have a shoulder reconstruction in July, meaning he would be sure to miss the rest of the season.

In 2007, he once again found himself on the outer. With injuries to Brett Burton and Mark Ricciuto, he was called up to play against the Brisbane Lions at the Gabba. As injuries kept occurring through the team, Luke played 6 straight games, including scoring 3 goals against Carlton in round 9, and picking up 16 possessions. He credited Adelaide coach Neil Craig for helping him get his career back on track. He was then dropped after round 12, and played one more game for the season, against Geelong in Round 19, scoring 1 goal.

At the end of the 2007 season, he was surprisingly left on the playing list, despite only playing 11 games in 3 years, ahead of players such as Jason Torney and Matthew Bode, who were delisted.

He was officially delisted by the club after the 2008 season.

Jericho now plays for Norwood in the SANFL.
