= Sarah Goodwin =

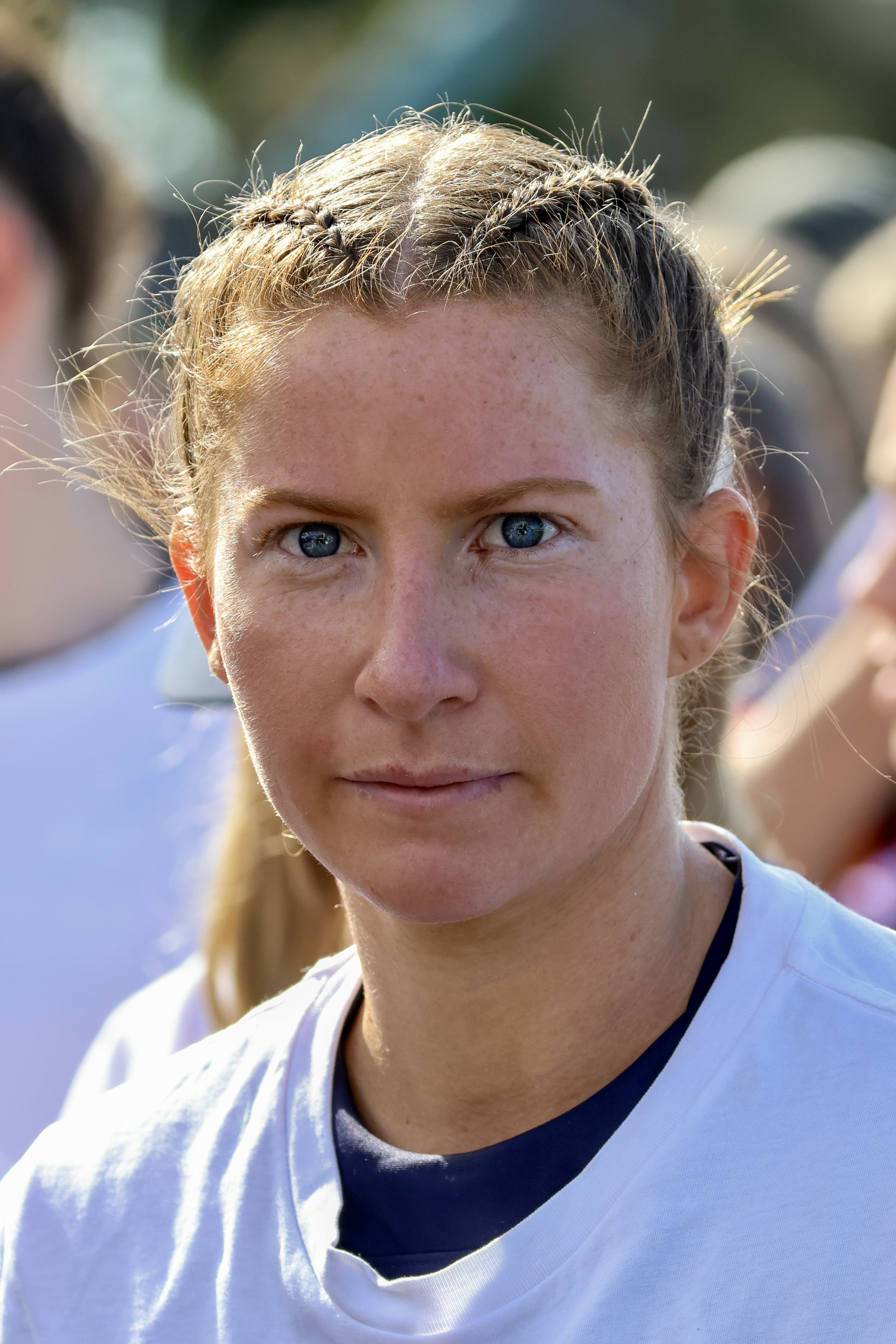
- Goodwin with Adelaide in 2026

Personal information
- Born: 9 July 2004 (age 22)
- Original teams: Glenelg (SANFL); Goodwood (Adelaide Footy League)
- Draft: No. 7, 2022 draft
- Debut: Round 4, 2022 ^{(S7)}, Port Adelaide vs. Sydney, at Alberton Oval
- Height: 168 cm (5 ft 6 in)
- Position: Defender/midfielder

Club information
- Current club: Adelaide
- Number: 11

Playing career^{1}
Years	Club	Games (Goals)
2022 ^{(S7)}	Port Adelaide	5 (0)
2023–	Adelaide	40 (0)
Total		45 (0)
- ^{1} Playing statistics correct to the end of elimination final, 2025.

Career highlights
- 2× 22under22 team: 2024, 2025

Sarah Goodwin (born 9 July 2004) is a professional Australian rules football player who currently plays for the Adelaide Crows in the AFL Women's (AFLW). She was initially drafted to Port Adelaide in the 2022 AFL Women's draft.

== Early life ==
Goodwin grew up supporting Adelaide in the Australian Football League, and played in their Next Generation Academy in her youth.

Goodwin played her junior football for the Goodwood Saints in the Adelaide Footy League until she was scouted by Glenelg to play in the SANFL Women's League (SANFLW). Also representing the South Australian state team, Goodwin was named in the under-18 All-Australian team in 2022, as well as The Advertiser's SANFLW team of the year. Her endurance was ranked fifth nationally, recording a 7min 31sec time in the 2 km test prior to the 2022 draft.

Goodwin was drafted with Port Adelaide's second pick of their debut AFLW draft, and the seventh pick overall.

== AFL Women's career ==
=== Port Adelaide ===
A member of Port Adelaide's inaugural AFLW squad, Goodwin played 5 games for the club in her first season, making her debut in round four against Sydney at Alberton Oval. The Power won this game convincingly by 66 points. After only one season, Goodwin departed the club to join cross-town rivals Adelaide.

=== Adelaide ===
Goodwin was traded to the Adelaide Crows during 2023's sign and trade period. The trade involved a player-swap, with Goodwin joining the Crows and Jasmine Simmons joining the Power. Goodwin played her first game for the club in the second-ever AFLW Showdown against her old team, taking place in the first round of the 2023 season at Norwood Oval. Goodwin played every game of Adelaide's season and became a consistent performer for the team. The Crows' season concluded in a preliminary final exit to North Melbourne at Ikon Park.

Prior to the 2024 season, Goodwin extended her contract with the Crows until at least the end of 2026. She received a coaches' vote for her 17 disposals in a week 7 clash against Greater Western Sydney. Prior to the club's fifth consecutive preliminary final, Goodwin was selected in the representative 22under22 team alongside three Adelaide teammates. Goodwin has not missed a game for the Crows since her trade.
