= Matthew Lobbe =

Australian rules footballer (born 1989)

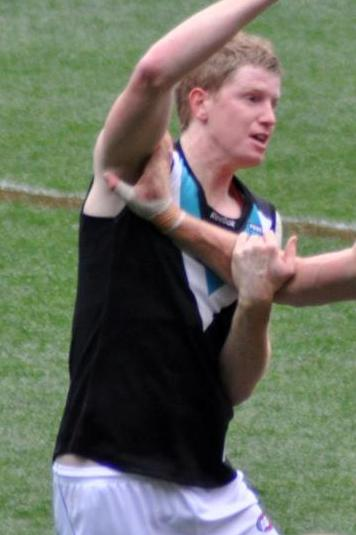
- Lobbe rucking for Port Adelaide in 2011

Personal information
- Born: 12 February 1989 (age 37)
- Original team: Eastern Ranges
- Height: 200 cm (6 ft 7 in)
- Weight: 100 kg (220 lb)
- Position: Ruckman

Club information
- Current club: Carlton
- Number: 27

Playing career^{1}
Years	Club	Games (Goals)
2007–2017	Port Adelaide	92 (21)
2018–2019	Carlton	8(1)
Total		100 (22)
- ^{1} Playing statistics correct to the end of Round 5, 2019.

Matthew Lobbe (/ˈloʊbi/ LOH-bee; born 12 February 1989) is a former professional Australian rules footballer who played for the Carlton Football Club in the Australian Football League (AFL). He previously played for the Port Adelaide Football Club from 2010 to 2017.

Lobbe grew up in Emerald, Victoria.

The Power's first pick (16) in the 2007 AFL draft spent all of 2008 in the SANFL reserves with the Port Adelaide Magpies. During the 2009 preseason, he put on an additional 8 kg and was seen as a future ruckman. Later on in the 2009 season, he was transferred from the Port Adelaide Magpies to the West Adelaide Bloods in a bid to play regular league football games. This was successful, as Lobbe became a regular first ruck for the Bloods.

Lobbe made his debut for the Power in Round 5, 2010 in an upset win over the top-placed St Kilda. He had a quiet debut in terms of disposals (only 3). However he was serviceable in the ruck, winning a total of 10 hit-outs against the experienced St Kilda ruck duo of Michael Gardiner and Steven King. The following week he also had 10 hit-outs against the Adelaide Crows in the Showdown. Lobbe returned to the side in round 12 against Sydney at AAMI Stadium and got 15 hit-outs.

Throughout Port Adelaide's largely successful 2014 campaign, Lobbe was the number 1 ruckman and played a pivotal role in the centre without support from other full-time rucks.

During the 2017 AFL trade season, Port Adelaide traded Lobbe to Carlton. He played two seasons at Carlton, playing eight senior games as a back-up ruckman, before being delisted at the end of the 2019 season.

Lobbe will serve as a playing assistant coach at the Werribee Football Club in the Victorian Football League in 2020.
