= Taylor Walker =

Taylor Walker may refer to:

- Taylor Walker (footballer) (born 1990), Australian rules footballer
- Taylor Walker (Days of our Lives), a character in the US television series Days of our Lives
- Taylor Walker Pubs, a pub chain part of Spirit Pub Company, demerged from Punch Taverns
- Taylor Walker & Co, a brewery, now part of Allied Breweries
