= Matthew Bode =

Australian rules footballer, born 1979

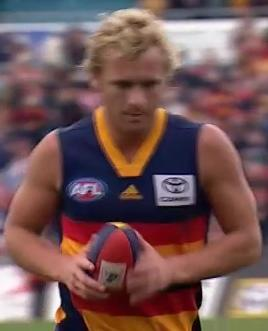

Personal information
- Born: 29 June 1979 (age 47)
- Original team: Glenelg (SANFL)
- Debut: Round 1, 1998, Port Adelaide vs. Sydney Swans, at Football Park
- Height: 178 cm (5 ft 10 in)
- Weight: 77 kg (170 lb)

Playing career^{1}
Years	Club	Games (Goals)
1998–2000	Port Adelaide	29 (25)
2001–2007	Adelaide	79 (71)
Total		108 (96)
- ^{1} Playing statistics correct to the end of 2007.

Career highlights
- AFL Rising Star nominee: 1999

Matthew Bode (born 29 June 1979) is a former professional Australian rules footballer who played for the Port Adelaide Football Club and the Adelaide Football Club in the Australian Football League (AFL).

Recruited from Glenelg Football Club in the South Australian National Football League (SANFL), Bode made his AFL debut in 1998 with Port Adelaide Football Club, playing as a small forward before moving to the Adelaide Football Club in 2001. Bode played just one game that year due to injury before having what was easily his best season in 2002, which saw him kick 22 goals and play all 25 games. He followed this with another solid year in 2003.

Bode had an injury-affected season in 2004, while in 2005 AFL season he had shoulder surgery which sidelined him after Round 2. In 2006 he found a niche in the side as Adelaide's main small forward at the start of the premiership season, kicking 9 goals in the first 5 rounds. Bode played 23 games for the year, scoring a total of 32 goals.

In 2007, Bode managed just one game, against the Western Bulldogs in Round 2. In this match, he suffered a knee injury that forced him to miss the rest of the season. He was delisted at the end of the season. Bode returned to play for Glenelg in the 2008 season.
