= Divine Mother =

Divine Mother or Mother Divine may refer to:

- Adi Parashakti, a goddess in the Hindu religion
- Bhagavathi, female goddesses in Hinduism, especially in Kerala
- Blessed Virgin Mary (Roman Catholic), of Roman Catholicism religion
- Wives of American religious leader Father Divine
  - Edna Rose Ritchings (c. 1925–2017)
  - Peninniah
- Hindu mother goddess
- Lady Master Venus, a goddess in Ascended Master Teachings
- Maharishi Vedic Education Development Corporation, which claims this term as a trademark of own
- Mirra Alfassa (1878–1973), known as "The Mother" in Hindu or Neo-Hindu context
- Mother goddess, a term used to refer to certain genre of goddess
- Shekhinah, feminine attributes of the presence of God

== See also ==
- God the Mother (disambiguation)
- Goddess worship (disambiguation)
- Magna Mater (disambiguation)
