= Great Mother =

Great Mother may refer to:

== Goddesses ==
- Mother goddesses of various traditions, representing motherhood, fertility, creation, or the bounty of the Earth:
  - Nammu, Sumerian creation goddess.
  - Cybele, Roman goddess with the title Magna Mater (Latin for "Great Mother")
  - Đạo Mẫu, in Vietnamese tradition
  - Maia (mythology), Roman goddess
  - Prajñāpāramitā Devi in Mahayana Buddhism, known as the "mother of Buddhas" or "Great Mother" (Tibetan: Yun Chenmo)
  - Great Mother, an archetypal image in Analytical psychology

== Other uses ==
- The Great Mother, a book by psychologist Erich Neumann
- Great Mother (Dungeons & Dragons), a deity character in the Dungeons & Dragons role-playing game
- Great Father and Great Mother, titles used in North America during the 19th century in interactions with indigenous peoples to refer to various heads of state

== See also ==
- Goddess, a female deity
- Great Goddess, the concept of an almighty goddess or mother goddess, or a matriarchal religion
- Magna Mater (disambiguation)
