= Mater Dei High School =

Mater Dei High School, after a title of Mary (Latin for Mother of God), may refer to:

- Mater Dei High School (Breese, Illinois)
- Mater Dei Catholic High School (Chula Vista, California)
- Mater Dei High School (Evansville, Indiana)
- Mater Dei High School (New Jersey) (1961-2023) in Middletown Township, New Jersey
- Mater Dei High School (Santa Ana, California)
- Mater Dei High School (Toowoomba) (1955-1974) in Queensland, Australia

== See also ==
- Mater Dei Academy, secondary school in Cork, Ireland
- Mater Dei Institute of Education, Dublin, Ireland
- Mater Dei Catholic College in Wagga Wagga, New South Wales, Australia
- Mater Dei (disambiguation)
- Mater Dei College (disambiguation)
