= Mother of God (disambiguation) =

Mother of God often refers to:

- Theotokos, in Eastern/Greek Orthodox Christianity
- Deipara, Latin for the Mother of God (Roman Catholic)
  - Deiparae Virginis Mariae, a 1946 encyclical of Pope Pius XII relating to the Assumption of the Blessed Virgin

== Art ==
- The Mother of God, a painting by Fyodor Bronnikov
- Mother of God of Trakai, an icon

== Books ==
- Mother of God, a novel by David Ambrose 1995
- The Mother of God, a book by Luna Tarlo
- Die Gottesmutter (novel), a German novel by Leopold Sacher-Masoch
- Mother of God: One Man’s Journey to the Uncharted Depths of the Amazon Rainforest, by Paul Rosolie
- Mother of God: A History of the Virgin Mary, by Miri Rubin
- On the Mother of God, by Jacob of Serug

== Churches ==
- Mother of God Church, Chotyniec
- Mother of God Church, Vettukad
- Mother of God Church, Vladivostok
- Mother of God Roman Catholic Church (Covington, Kentucky)

== Other uses ==
- Mother of God Community, Washington DC
- Mother of God Primary School, Primary School in Ivanhoe East, Victoria

== See also ==
- Mother of the Gods (disambiguation)
- Church of the Mother of God (disambiguation)
- God the Mother (disambiguation)
- Mater Dei (disambiguation)
