= Mater Dei College (disambiguation) =

Mater Dei College is a Roman Catholic institution located in Tubigon, Bohol, Philippines.

Mater Dei College may also refer to:

- Mater Dei Catholic College, Wagga Wagga, New South Wales, Australia
- One of the colleges that formed St Peter's Catholic College, Tuggerah, New South Wales, Australia
- Mater Dei College (Edgewater), a high school in Edgewater, Western Australia
- Mater Dei College (New York), a former school in Ogdensburg, New York

== See also ==
- Mater Dei (disambiguation)
- Mater Dei High School (disambiguation)
