= Mater Dei =

Mater Dei (Latin for Mother of God) is a title of Mary. It may refer to:

== Educational institutions ==
- Mater Dei College (disambiguation)
- Mater Dei High School (disambiguation)

=== Australia ===
- Mater Dei Catholic Primary School, Ashgrove, Queensland
- Mater Dei Primary School in Toowoomba, Queensland
- Mater Dei Special School in Camden, New South Wales

=== Ireland ===
- Mater Dei Academy, secondary school in Cork
- Mater Dei Institute of Education (1999–2016), Dublin

=== United States ===
- Mater Dei High School (Santa Ana, California), a Catholic high school in Santa Ana, California
- Mater Dei School (Bethesda, Maryland)
- Mater Dei Seminary, in Omaha, Nebraska; see Mark Pivarunas
- Mater Dei Academy, a Catholic K-8 school in Wickliffe, Ohio
- Mater Dei Catholic School, Lansdale, Pennsylvania

=== Other places ===
- Mater Dei Hospital, Msida, Malta
- Mater Dei School, New Delhi, India
- Mater Dei School (Thailand), Bangkok, Thailand

== Other uses ==
- Sancta Maria, mater Dei, a 1777 composition by Wolfgang Amadeus Mozart
- Mater dei (1950 film), an Italian drama film directed by Emilio Cordero
- Mater dei (2000 film), a Brazilian film by Enio Mainardi starring Gabriel Braga Nunes, Milhem Cortaz and Carolina Ferraz
- Mater dei (2004 film), a Brazilian short movie by Renato Rama starring Nívea Stelmann and Mário Frias
- Mater dei (2018 film), a Cuban documentary by Eliecer Jiménez Almeida

== See also ==
- Mother of God (disambiguation)
