= MDHS =

MDHS can refer to any of the following:

== High schools ==
- Markham District High School, Markham, Ontario, Canada
- Mater Dei High School (disambiguation)
- Medical District High School, Memphis, Tennessee, USA
- Monsignor Donovan High School, Toms River, New Jersey, USA
- Mount Douglas High School, Saanich, British Columbia, Canada
- Milton District High School, Milton, Ontario, Canada
- Myungduk High School, Gangseo District, Seoul, South Korea

== Other ==
- MDHS100, a standard for Surveying, sampling and assessment of asbestos containing materials produced by the UK Health and Safety Laboratory
- Majlis Daerah Hulu Selangor, a local authority in Kuala Kubu Bharu in Malaysia
- Maryland Historical Society, abbreviated as "MdHS"
- The University of Melbourne Faculty of Medicine, Dentistry and Health Sciences
- Mississippi Department of Human Services
- MDHS, the Delhi Metro station code for Mandi House metro station, New Delhi, India
