= Garden of One Thousand Buddhas =

Buddhist monument and retreat center in Montana, United States

Coordinates: 47°11′30″N 114°05′23″W

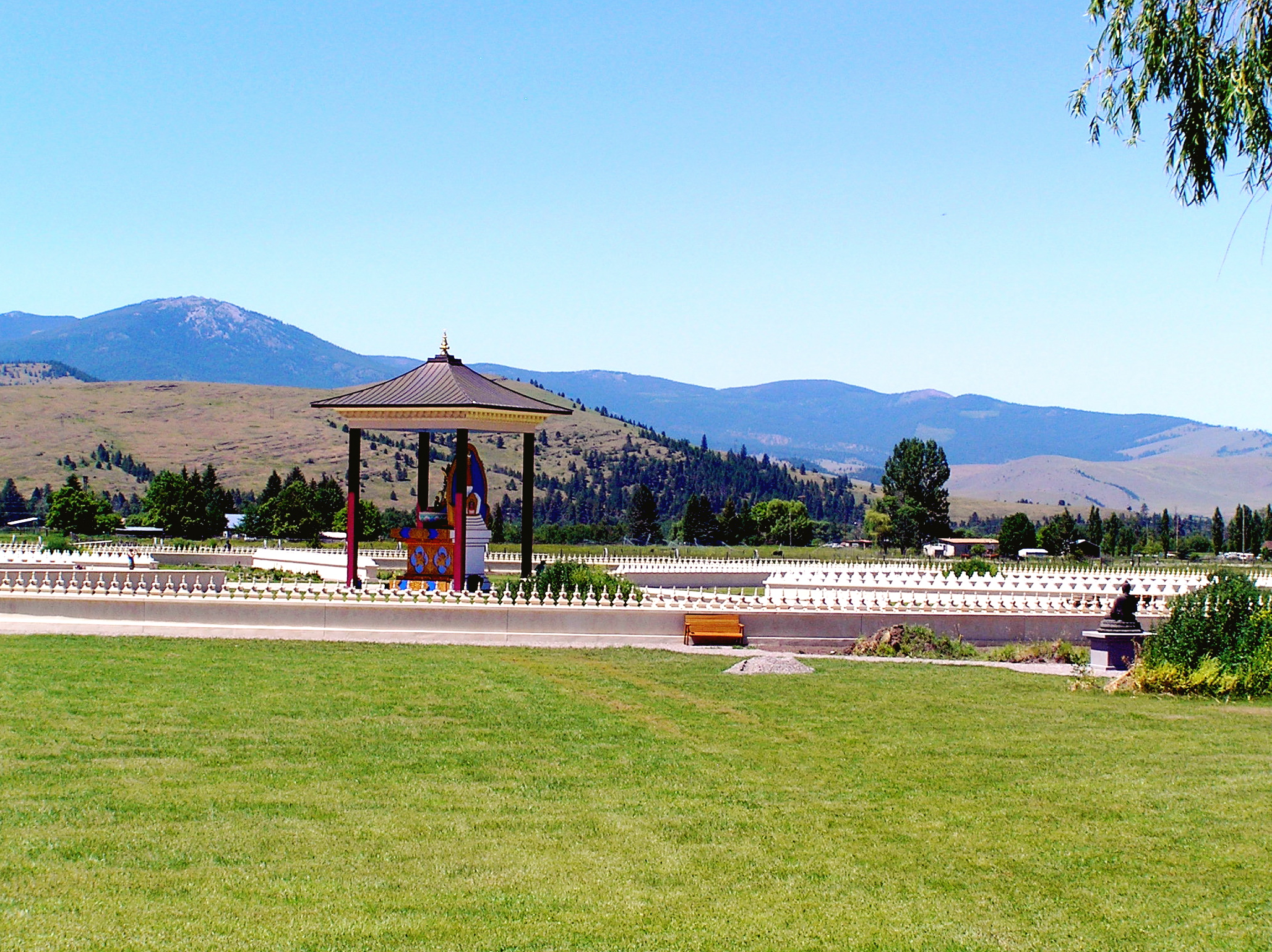
Garden of One Thousand Buddhas dharmacakra, looking to the northwest

The Garden of One Thousand Buddhas is a spiritual site near Arlee, Montana, within the Flathead Indian Reservation in Lake County, Montana, United States. The monument portion of the site is 750 square feet (70 m^{2}) in area and the surrounding garden is spread across 10 acres (4.0 ha) of land. It is intended to be a pilgrimage destination for the Western hemisphere and a major place of worship for people of many faiths. The garden is free to the public and open all year round.

== History ==
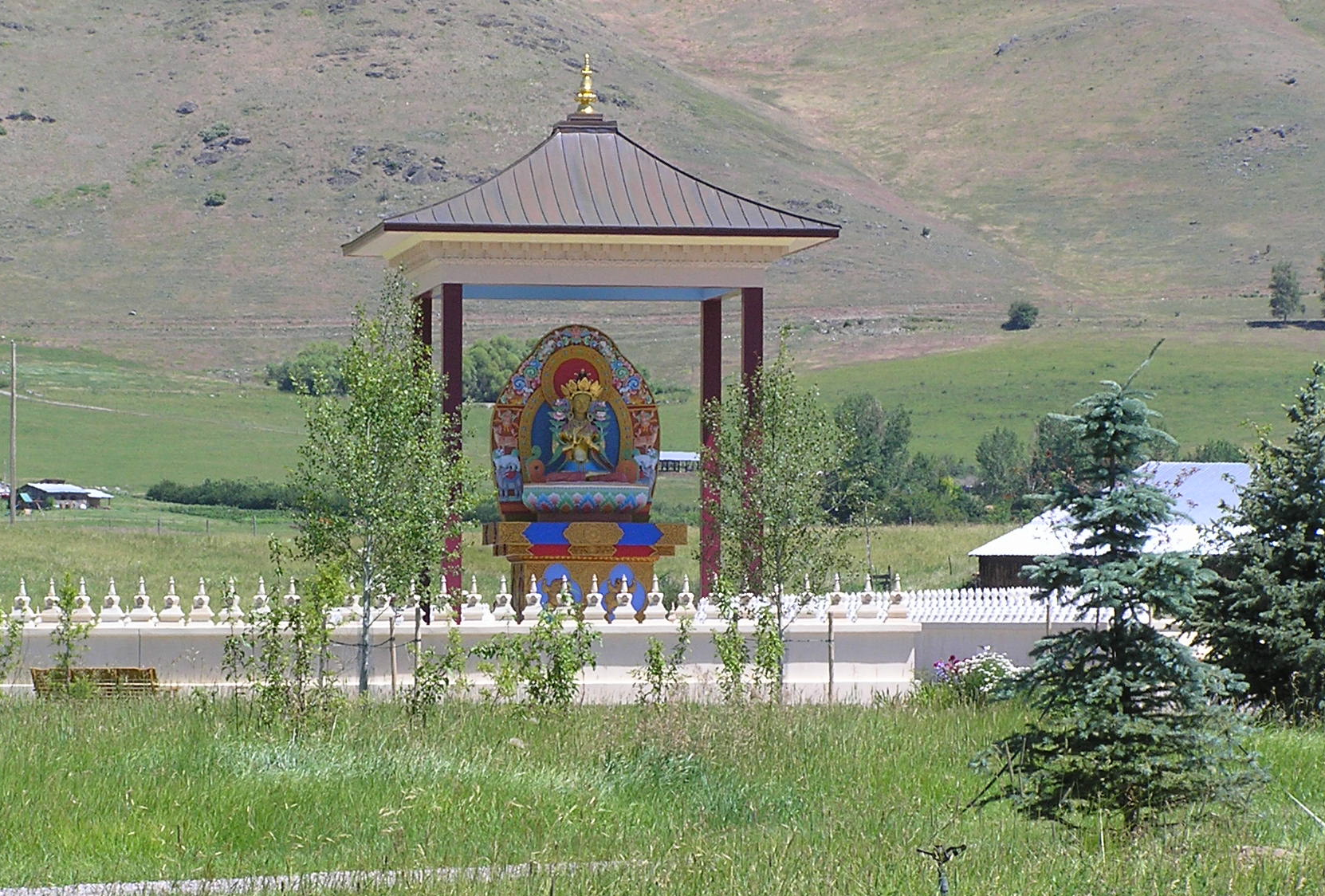
Pavilion and stupas

The garden was founded by Gochen Tulku Sang-ngag Rinpoche, a Tibetan master of the Nyingma school of Buddhism. Following a traditional Buddhist method, Sang-Ngag claimed to have chosen the location immediately upon seeing it, recalling a prophetic dream from his youth which corresponded to the garden's landscape. Subsequently, Sang-ngag's non-profit organization, Ewam, received the land in an anonymous donation by one of the Rinpoche's disciples, and construction began in 2000.

In 2015 the final Buddha was placed, reaching the goal of 1000 Buddhas and 1000 stupas. On October 7, 2023, Rabjam Rinpoche officially consecrated the garden.

== Design and symbolism ==
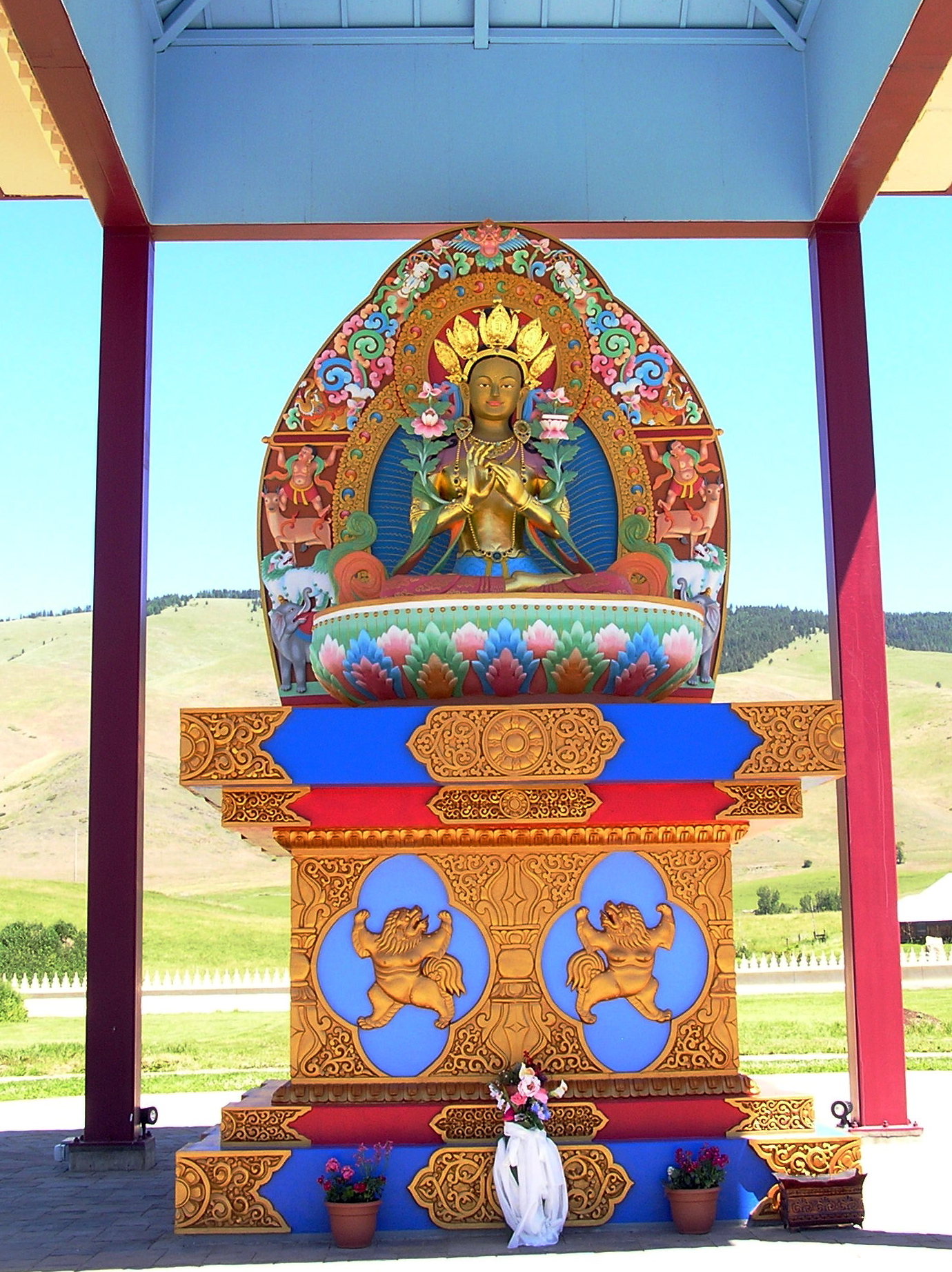
Yum Chenmo - Prajnaparamita - The Great Mother

=== Dharmachakra ===
Set in the Jocko Valley, the monument itself is a footpath in the shape of a dharmachakra (trns. "Wheel of Dharma"), a central symbol of Buddhism with manifold meanings. It represents the teachings of the Buddha, specifically the Noble Eightfold Path and the cycle of life, death, and rebirth. As a form of mandala, it can also be said to represent existence in its entirety. Five hundred feet in diameter, the path is composed of an outer ring and eight symmetrical lines stemming from the central statue of Yum Chenmo.

=== Yum Chenmo, Prajnaparamita ===
The deity Prajnaparamita Devi represents the pinnacle of an enlightened woman: a yogini who has, through mastery of wisdom, become a dakini, or female supernatural being. She advocates wisdom through realization of the "empty," or ephemeral nature of the sensual world. She is also known as Yum Chenmo, Mahamaya, Prajnaparamita (the symbolic mother of all Buddhas). Her statue features an ornamental base with traditional Buddhist motifs and is twenty-four feet tall. There is a six foot deep vault underneath her holding Buddhist relics and prayers.

=== 1,000 Buddhas ===
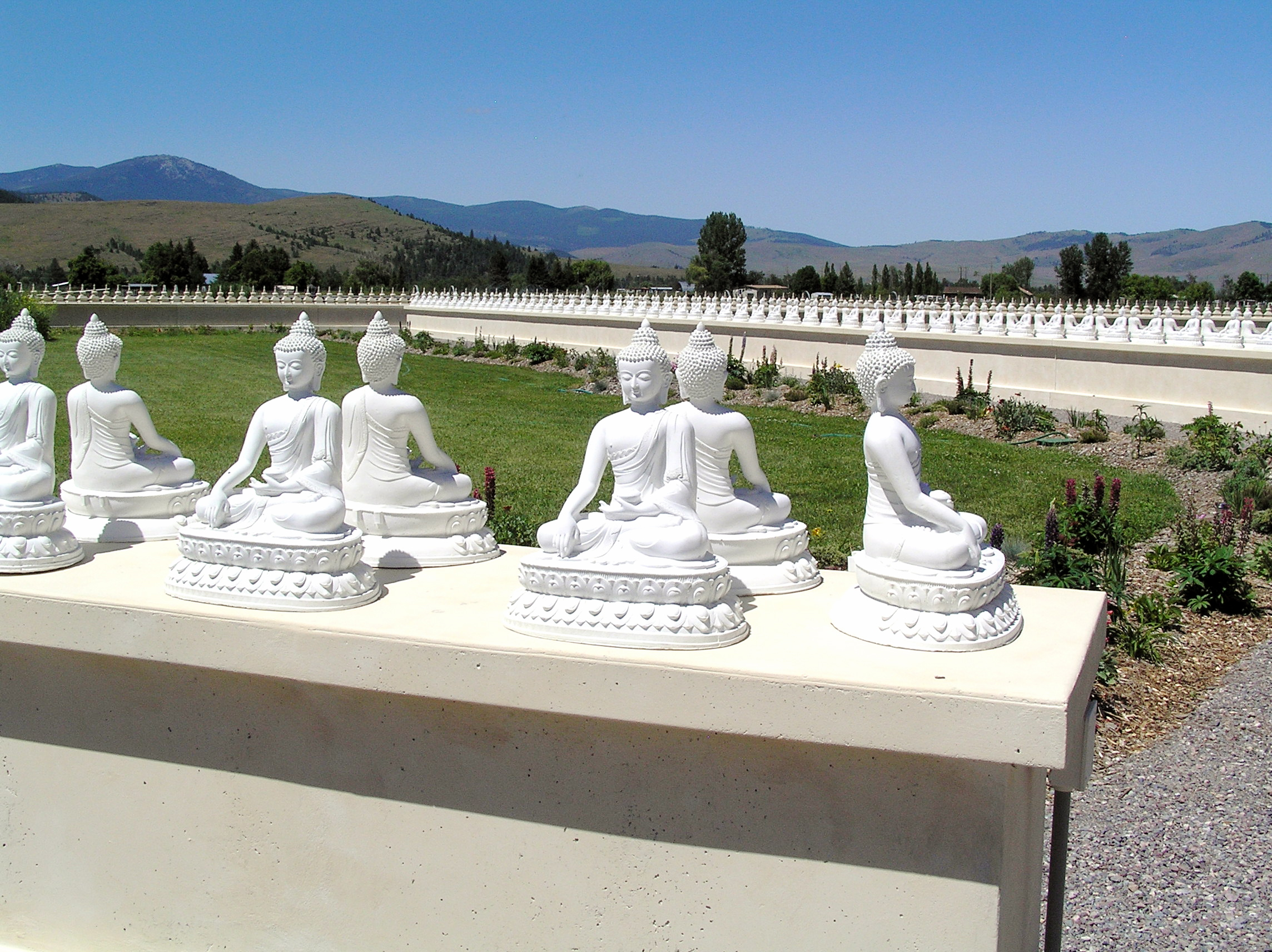
Detail of 1000 Buddhas

Each spoke of the Dharmachakra is lined with 125 two-foot statues of male Buddhas, representing the 1,000 avatars written of in Buddhist texts who are destined to redeem the world in successive eras, of which Gautama Buddha was only the fourth.

=== Landscaping ===
The garden area will feature many flowering plants, particularly lavender, and 1,000 planted trees. A pond and four prayer wheels are additional features.

== Purpose and usage ==
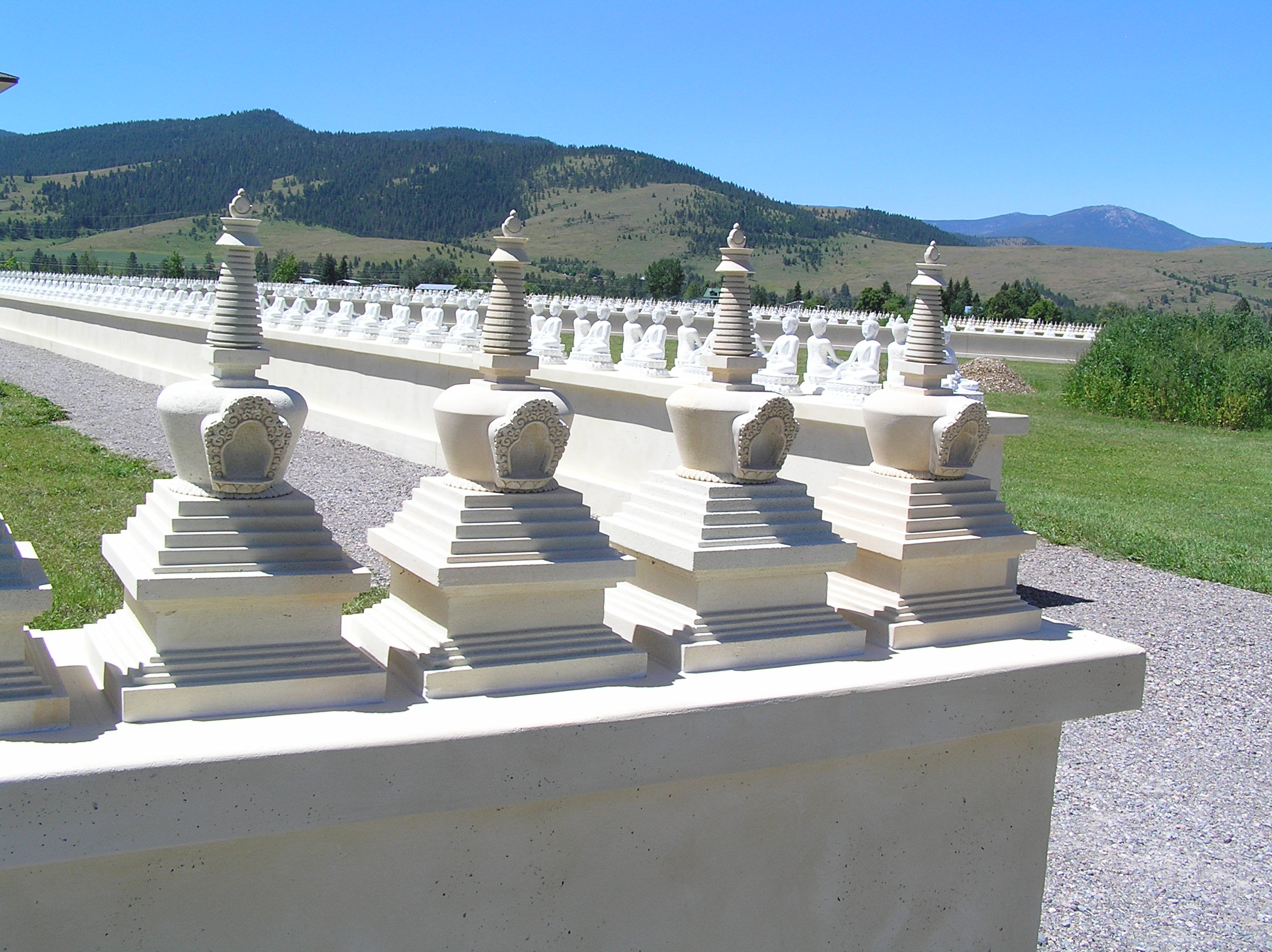
Detail of stupas

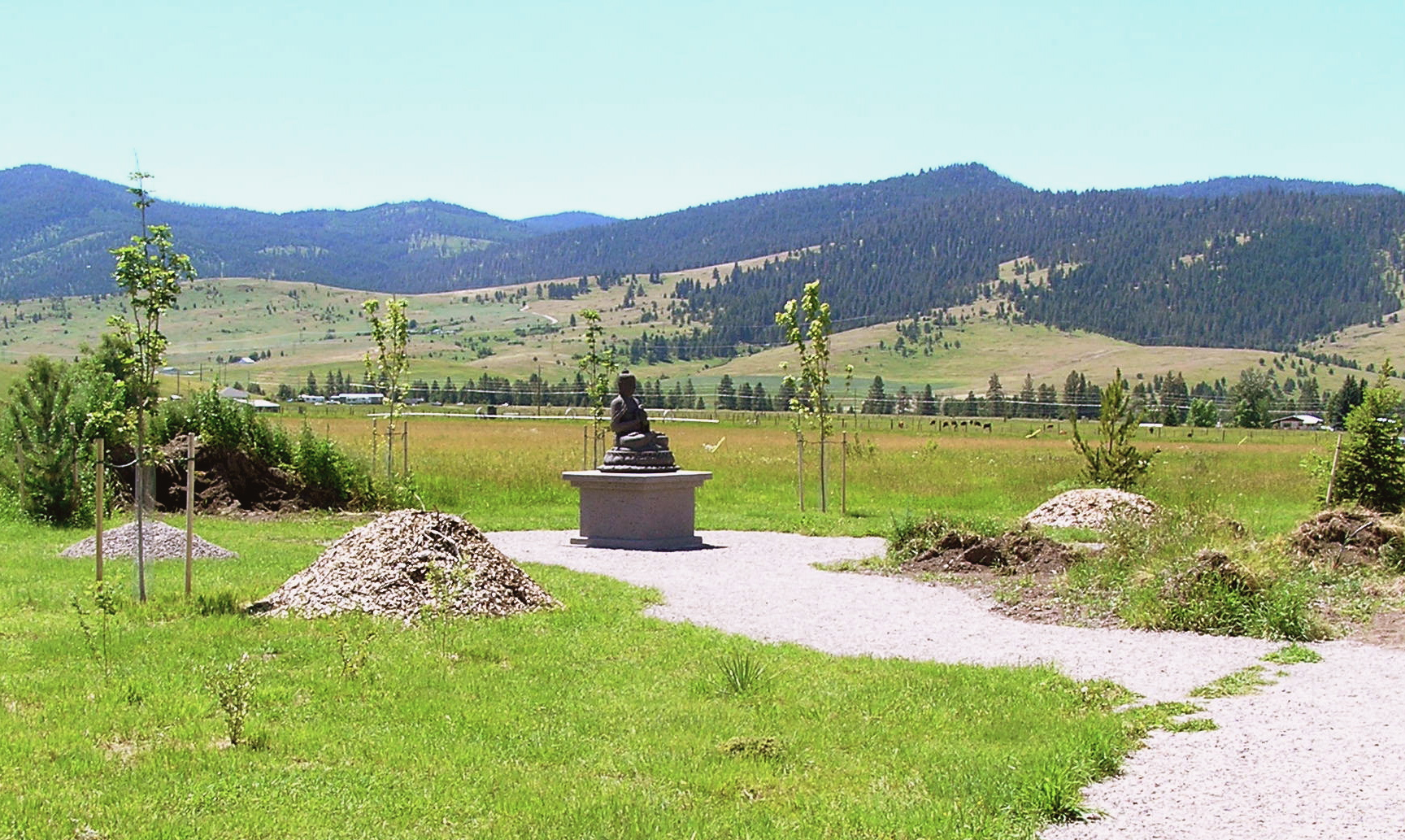
Buddhas anchoring the four compass points

It is Sang-ngag's intention that the garden will inspire Buddhist ideals of joy, wisdom, and compassion in a place where Eastern philosophy is not widely known, thus bringing all beings closer to enlightenment: the sworn goal of Bodhisattvas.

The garden's center is for ceremonial gatherings, and has been used as a venue for mass or individual prayer, speeches, musical performances, and shared spiritual practices with the local Salish-Kootenai people. A 2011 interview quoted tribal officials as grateful for the open and nondenominational nature of the garden, a welcome difference from other immigrant cultures which have been allowed to purchase tribal land because of a 1910 act that permits non-tribal settlement. Certain similar beliefs, and a shared history of persecution in their native lands have been described as uniting factors between the Buddhists and people of the Confederated Salish Kootenai Tribes. Sang-ngag himself was imprisoned during the Chinese Invasion of Tibet for ten years.

The outer rim is to be used for the practice of circumambulation, walking clockwise around a sacred location while meditating on the cyclical nature of existence.

== See also ==
- Bhadrakalpika Sūtra c. 200-250 CE, which gives names of 1002 Buddhas
