= Harry Himmelberg =

Australian rules footballer

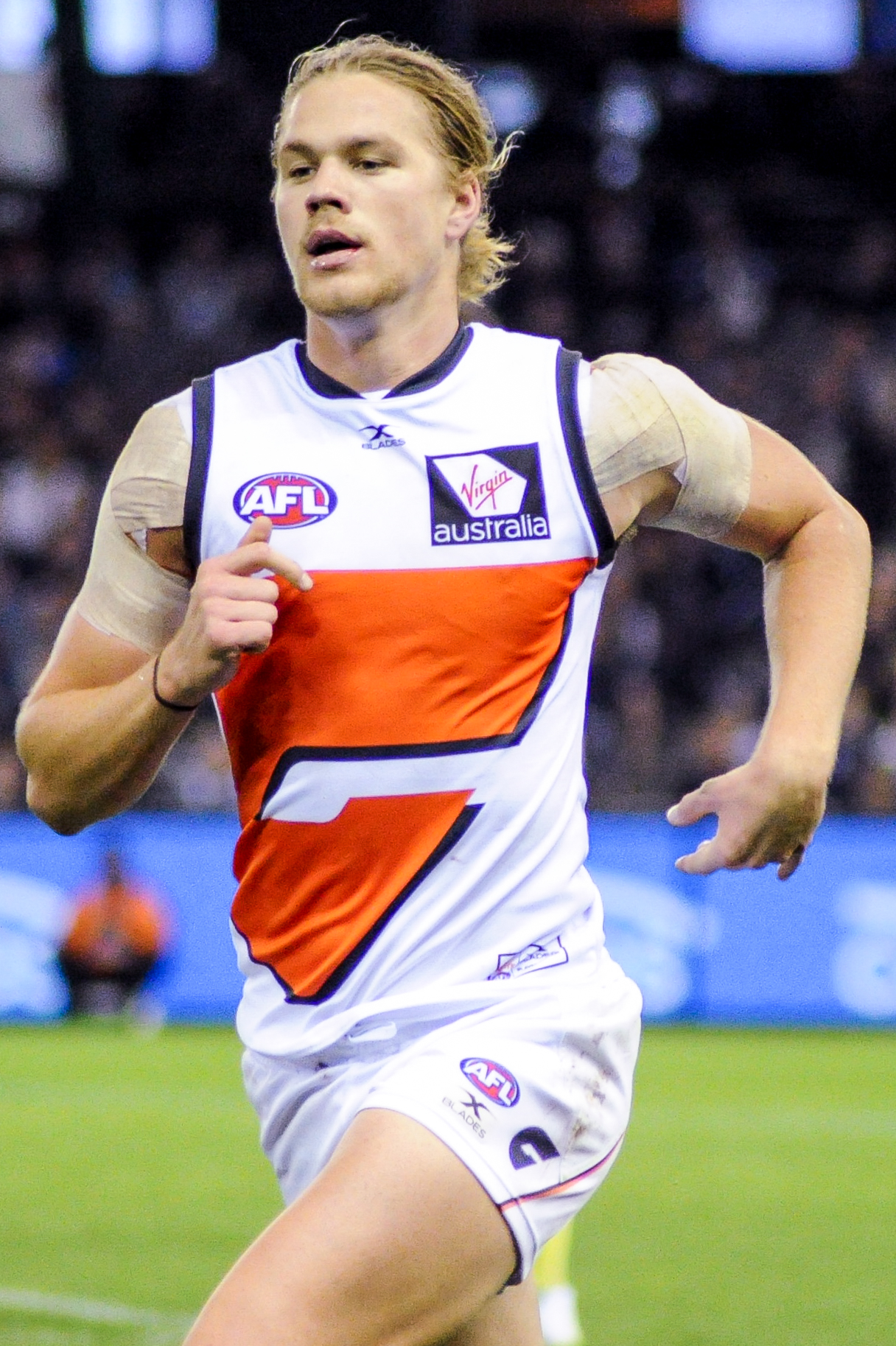
- Himmelberg playing for Greater Western Sydney in June 2017

Personal information
- Full name: Harrison George Himmelberg
- Born: 8 May 1996 (age 30); Wagga Wagga, New South Wales
- Original team: Mangoplah (RFNL)/Canberra Demons (NEAFL)
- Draft: No. 16, 2015 national draft
- Debut: Round 17, 2016, Greater Western Sydney vs. Brisbane Lions, at The Gabba
- Height: 195 cm (6 ft 5 in)
- Weight: 94 kg (207 lb)
- Positions: Key Forward, Key Defender

Club information
- Current club: Greater Western Sydney
- Number: 27

Playing career^{1}
Years	Club	Games (Goals)
2016–	Greater Western Sydney	224 (166)
- ^{1} Playing statistics correct to the end of 2026.

Career highlights
- AFL Mark of the Year: 2023

Harrison George Himmelberg (born 8 May 1996) is a professional Australian rules footballer playing for the Greater Western Sydney Giants in the Australian Football League (AFL).

== Early life ==
Himmelberg was born in Wagga Wagga in the Riverina and spent one year of his childhood living in New York City where his American father was working.

Upon returning to Wagga, he participated in the Auskick program at Mangoplah Cookardinia United Eastlakes Football & Netball Club in Mangoplah and began playing his junior football at the club in the Riverina Football League.

Himmelberg moved to Canberra at 17 years of age to further his development with the GWS Giants developmental academy and the NSW/ACT Rams in the elite TAC Cup under-18 competition. He was drafted by Greater Western Sydney with their third selection and sixteenth overall in the 2015 national draft.

He was educated at Wagga Wagga's Mater Dei Primary and Mater Dei Catholic College.

His younger brother Elliott also plays professional football for the Gold Coast Suns.

== AFL career ==
Himmelberg made his AFL debut in the seventy-nine point win against the Brisbane Lions in round 17, 2016 at the Gabba.

In 2023, Himmelberg received two nominations for Mark of the Year, winning the award for his mark against Adelaide at Giants Stadium in round one.

== Statistics ==
Updated to the end of round 22, 2026.

Legend
G	Goals	K	Kicks	D	Disposals	T	Tackles
B	Behinds	H	Handballs	M	Marks

Season	Team	No.	Games	Totals							Averages (per game)							Votes
Season	Team	No.	Games	G	B	K	H	D	M	T	G	B	K	H	D	M	T	Votes
2016	Greater Western Sydney	27	4	0	1	34	19	53	14	5	0.0	0.3	8.5	4.8	13.3	3.5	1.3	0
2017	Greater Western Sydney	27	12	9	6	60	71	131	35	32	0.8	0.5	5.0	5.9	10.9	2.9	2.7	0
2018	Greater Western Sydney	27	24	29	21	166	139	305	93	53	1.2	0.9	6.9	5.8	12.7	3.9	2.2	0
2019	Greater Western Sydney	27	25	38	12	169	128	297	105	48	1.5	0.5	6.8	5.1	11.9	4.2	1.9	1
2020 (Note: The 2020 season was played with 17 home-and-away matches per team (down from 22) and 16-minute quarters with time on (down from 20-minute quarters with time on) due to the impact of the COVID-19 pandemic.)	Greater Western Sydney	27	16	15	4	97	57	154	43	27	0.9	0.3	6.1	3.6	9.6	2.7	1.7	1
2021	Greater Western Sydney	27	24	36	19	194	107	301	108	46	1.5	0.8	8.1	4.5	12.5	4.5	1.9	0
2022	Greater Western Sydney	27	22	22	6	274	121	395	132	49	1.0	0.3	12.5	5.5	18.0	6.0	2.2	5
2023	Greater Western Sydney	27	25	12	7	291	165	456	121	44	0.5	0.3	11.6	6.6	18.2	4.8	1.8	0
2024	Greater Western Sydney	27	25	0	2	331	189	520	157	55	0.0	0.1	13.2	7.6	20.8	6.3	2.2	0
2025	Greater Western Sydney	27	24	3	1	281	162	443	170	44	0.1	0.0	11.7	6.8	18.5	7.1	1.8	0
2026	Greater Western Sydney	27	21	2	1	206	150	356	117	30	0.1	0.0	9.8	7.1	17.0	5.6	1.4	0
Career			222	166	80	2103	1308	3411	1095	433	0.7	0.4	9.5	5.9	15.4	4.9	2.0	7
