= God the Mother =

God the Mother may refer to:

- Mother goddess
- Zahng Gil-jah
- Heavenly Mother (Mormonism)

== See also ==
- Divine Mother (disambiguation)
- Mother of God (disambiguation)
