= Mother of the Gods =

Mother of the Gods may refer to:

- Rhea (mythology) in Greek mythology
- Cybele in Roman mythology

== See also ==
- Mother of God (disambiguation)
