= Die Gottesmutter =

The Mother of God is a novel, originally the work of the Austrian author Leopold von Sacher-Masoch (1836–1895), that was published in 1886 as "Die Gottesmutter" and then in French as La Mère de Dieu. The present English translation, released by William Holmes in January 2015, is the only known version in that language.

== Plot ==
The novel features the story of Sabadil, a simple peasant farmer living in Eastern Europe in the late nineteenth century. After a chance encounter in a forest with a beautiful but mysterious woman, his life changes forever. Driven by infatuation, he traces her to a village where it transpires that she heads a quasi-Christian cult, the members of which pay her unquestioning devotion. Blinded by unrequited love, the farmer is drawn into a web of manipulation, cruelty and violence from which there is no escape.

== Notes ==
The translator, William Holmes, felt that Masoch's original text ended rather "up in the air", so he penned a further three chapters to bring the book to what he regards as a more satisfactory conclusion. Other material has been added in the form of explanatory notes where the meanings of certain words or situations are obscure.
