= Mater Dei Catholic College =

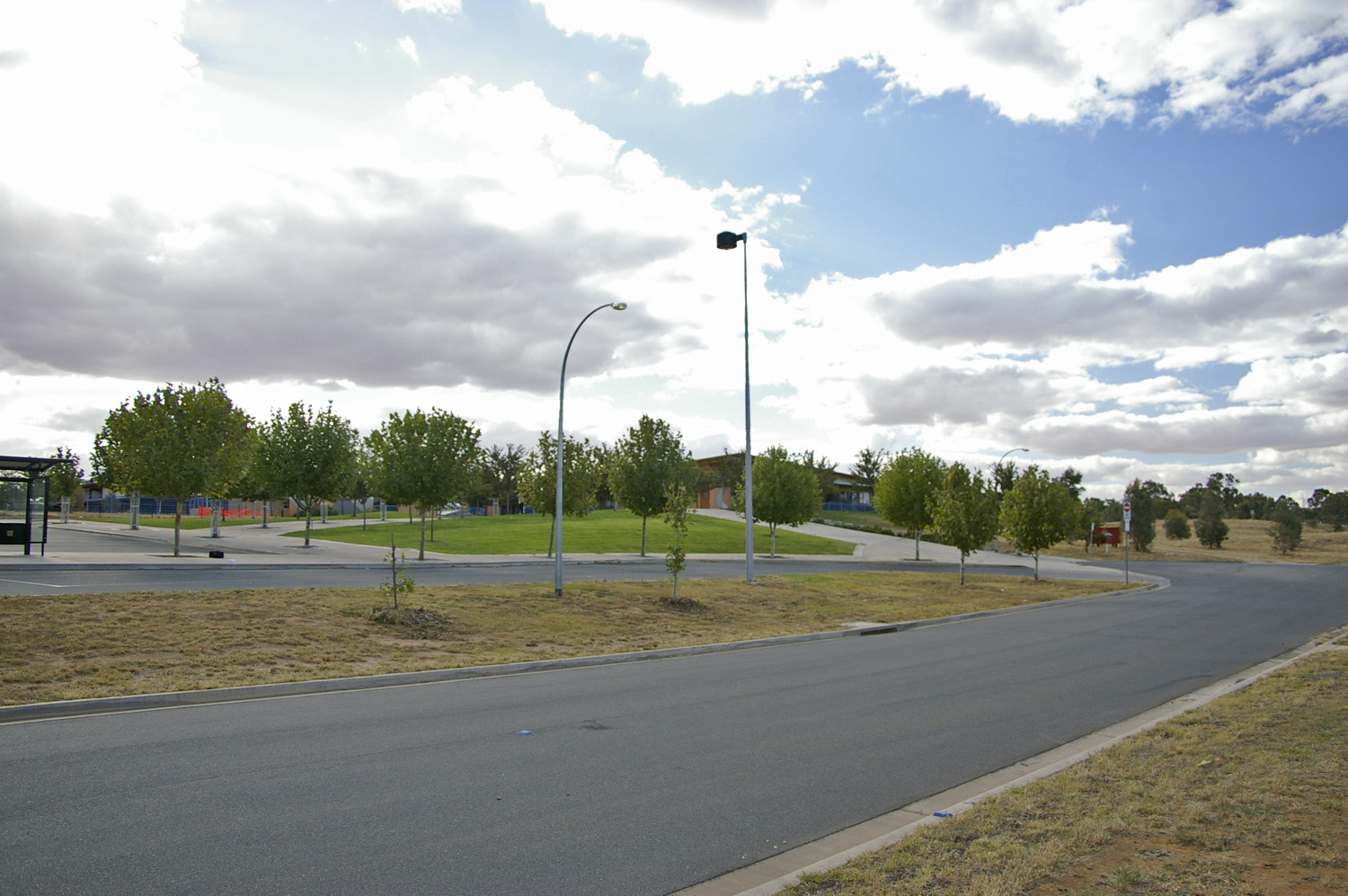

Location
- Wagga Wagga, New South Wales; Australia; 35°10′32″S 147°21′50″E

Information
- Type: Independent co-educational secondary day school
- Motto: Live God's message
- Denomination: Roman Catholic
- Established: December 2003; 22 years ago
- Oversight: Roman Catholic Diocese of Wagga Wagga
- Principal: Val Thomas
- Years: 7–12
- Colours: Maroon, navy blue, yellow and white
- Website: mdccww.catholic.edu.au

Mater Dei Catholic College is a Catholic co-educational secondary day school catering for students in Year 7 to Year 12, located in the Wagga Wagga suburb of Lake Albert, in New South Wales, Australia. Weekday boarding is available though Mount Erin Boarding.

== History ==
Mater Dei Catholic College was established in 2003 by Wagga Wagga Diocesan Catholic Schools Office as part of the decision in 1999 to establish two Catholic co-educational colleges from Years 7 to 12. Prior to this, there was two 7–10 Catholic High schools, one for boys (Saint Michael's Regional High School, Wagga) and one for girls (Mount Erin High School, Wagga). Then, in years 11 and 12, both schools merged to Trinity Senior High School, located at the current site of Kildare Catholic College, Wagga.

== Overview ==
The school is a Catholic secondary school in the Wagga Wagga Denerary and Diocese. It has five houses which are each named after significant people in the college's history. Kennedy (Blue), after Graham Kennedy, Rosarie (Red), after Sister Rosarie, Webber (Green), after Sister Webber, Caroll (Purple) House after Bishop Carroll and Sherrin (Gold) after Brother Carl Sherrin, principal of Trinity Senior High from 1988 to 1993.

== Principals ==
The following individuals have served as College Principal:

| Ordinal | Officeholders | Term start | Term end | Time in office | Notes |
|---|---|---|---|---|---|
| 1 | Clem Welch | 2004 | 2007 | 2–3 years | |
| 2 | Greg Miller | 2008 | 2014 | 5–6 years | |
| 3 | Val Thomas | 2015 | incumbent | 10–11 years | |

== Notable alumni ==
- Harrison Himmelberg – AFL Footballer
- Matthew Kennedy – AFL Footballer
- Harry Cunningham – AFL Footballer
- Elliott Himmelberg – AFL Footballer

== See also ==
- List of Catholic schools in New South Wales
- List of schools in the Riverina
- Catholic education in Australia
