= Goddess worship =

Goddess worship may refer to:

== Historical and polytheistic traditions ==
- Worship of goddesses in polytheistic religions, such as:
  - Ancient Egyptian religion
  - Ancient Greek religion
  - Mesopotamian religion

== Living movements and religious traditions ==
- Goddess movement, a modern spiritual movement rooted in feminist theology and Neopaganism
- Shaktism, a major tradition of Hinduism that venerates the divine feminine as the supreme being
- Thelema, a spiritual philosophy that venerates Nuit, goddess of infinite space and stars, as the central divine principle
- Wicca, a contemporary Pagan religion that often includes worship of a goddess, either as part of a duotheistic pair or polytheistically
  - Dianic Wicca, a feminist tradition within Wicca that focuses exclusively on the worship of the Goddess

== Scholarly theories ==
- Great Goddess hypothesis, a scholarly theory proposing a widespread prehistoric worship of a singular goddess
