= Elliott Himmelberg =

Australian rules footballer

Personal information
- Nicknames: Big Easy, Dragon
- Born: 4 June 1998 (age 28); Wagga Wagga, New South Wales
- Original team: Redland (NEAFL)
- Draft: No. 51, 2016 national draft No. 63, 2026 national draft
- Debut: Round 23, 2018, Adelaide vs. Carlton, at Docklands Stadium
- Height: 200 cm (6 ft 7 in)
- Weight: 99 kg (218 lb)
- Position: Key forward

Club information
- Current club: Gold Coast
- Number: 12

Playing career^{1}
Years	Club	Games (Goals)
2017–2024	Adelaide	50 (49)
2025–	Gold Coast	0 (0)
Total		50 (49)
- ^{1} Playing statistics correct to the end of 2026.

Elliott Himmelberg (born 4 June 1998) is a professional Australian rules footballer playing for the Gold Coast Suns in the Australian Football League (AFL), having previously played for Adelaide.

Himmelberg is the younger brother of Greater Western Sydney player Harry.

== Early life ==
Himmelberg grew up in Wagga Wagga, New South Wales. He moved to Brisbane in Queensland in 2016 where he began playing with Redland. Himmelberg was selected to play for Queensland and the Allies in the 2016 AFL Under 18 Championships. He suffered a broken leg, which stopped him from attending the AFL Draft Combine, and missed the rest of the 2016 season. He was involved with the Lions Academy but was not eligible for exclusive selection in the 2016 AFL draft because he had not spent enough time in Queensland. Himmelberg was selected by Adelaide with pick 51 in the 2016 national draft, their third selection.

== AFL career ==
=== Adelaide ===
In 2017, Himmelberg played 13 South Australian National Football League (SANFL) games, kicking 19 goals, including four in round 12 against the Port Adelaide Magpies. He suffered a foot injury in July which kept him out for the remainder of the season. In 2018, Himmelberg signed a two-year contract extension, tying him to Adelaide until 2020. He was named in the Adelaide squad for the inaugural AFLX tournament, and as an emergency for the JLT Community Series. He played more often as a ruckman in the SANFL, as fellow key-position players Paul Hunter and Reilly O'Brien suffered injuries. Himmelberg made his AFL debut in round 23 against Carlton at Docklands Stadium. He recorded 13 disposals and five marks, and kicked his first goal with a banana shot. Coach Don Pyke said, "He's performed really well and didn't look out of place at all."

Himmelberg had a career-best game against Port Adelaide in the Showdown in which Jordan Dawson kicked a goal after the siren. The forward kicked four goals, two of which came in the last quarter in the comeback victory.

=== Gold Coast ===
Himmelberg moved to Gold Coast as a free agent following the 2024 AFL season, signing a three-year deal.

In May 2025, Himmelberg tore his ACL during a VFL match.

== Statistics ==
Updated to the end of the 2025 season.

Legend
G	Goals	K	Kicks	D	Disposals	T	Tackles
B	Behinds	H	Handballs	M	Marks

Season	Team	No.	Games	Totals							Averages (per game)							Votes
Season	Team	No.	Games	G	B	K	H	D	M	T	G	B	K	H	D	M	T	Votes
2017	Adelaide	34	0	—	—	—	—	—	—	—	—	—	—	—	—	—	—	0
2018	Adelaide	34	1	1	1	5	8	13	5	3	1.0	1.0	5.0	8.0	13.0	5.0	3.0	0
2019	Adelaide	34	7	8	4	38	29	67	24	23	1.1	0.6	5.4	4.1	9.6	3.4	3.3	0
2020 (Note: The 2020 season was played with 17 home-and-away matches per team (down from 22) and 16-minute quarters with time on (down from 20-minute quarters with time on) due to the impact of the COVID-19 pandemic.)	Adelaide	34	11	9	10	58	48	106	33	21	0.8	0.9	5.3	4.4	9.6	3.0	1.9	0
2021	Adelaide	34	8	8	6	42	29	71	25	8	1.0	0.8	5.3	3.6	8.9	3.1	1.0	0
2022	Adelaide	34	11	14	5	59	50	109	34	19	1.3	0.5	5.4	4.5	9.9	3.1	1.7	0
2023	Adelaide	34	3	1	0	18	8	26	11	4	0.3	0.0	6.0	2.7	8.7	3.7	1.3	0
2024	Adelaide	34	9	8	5	53	35	88	29	16	0.9	0.6	5.9	3.9	9.8	3.2	1.8	0
2025	Adelaide	34	0	—	—	—	—	—	—	—	—	—	—	—	—	—	—	0
Career			50	49	31	273	207	480	161	94	1.0	0.6	5.5	4.1	9.6	3.2	1.9	0
