= Magna Mater (disambiguation) =

Magna Mater, or Cybele, is an Anatolian mother goddess.

Magna Mater may also refer to:

- Maia, one of the Pleiades and the mother of Hermes in the ancient Greek religion
- Rhea, a deity in Greek mythology
- "Magna Mater" (short story), 1974, by Joyce Carol Oates

== See also ==
- Great Mother (disambiguation)
