= Prajñāpāramitā Devī =

Buddha of Transcendent Wisdom

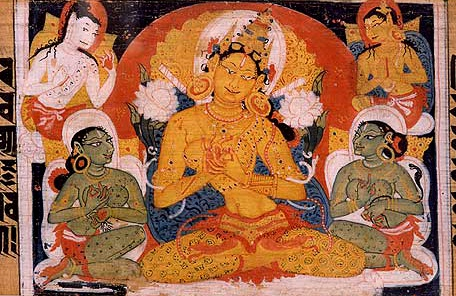
Prajñāpāramitā Devī in an illustrated Sanskrit Aṣṭasāhasrikā Prajñāpāramitā Sūtra manuscript from Nalanda (Bihar, India), circa 700–1100 CE

Prajñāpāramitā Devī (Sanskrit: प्रज्ञापारमिता देवी, lit. 'Perfection of Wisdom Goddess'; Tibetan: ཤེས་རབ་ཀྱི་ཕ་རོལ་ཏུ་ཕྱིན་མ, abbr. ཤེར་ཕྱིན་མ, Wylie: shes rab kyi pa rol tu chin ma abbr. sher chin ma) is a female Buddha that symbolizes and embodies Prajñāpāramitā, the perfection of transcendent wisdom. This is the highest kind of wisdom in Mahayana and Vajrayana, which leads to Buddhahood and is the spontaneous source of Buddhahood. This is the essence of the Prajñāpāramitā sutras of which there are thousands. As such, Prajñāpāramitā Devī is a samboghakaya Buddha, and is known as "Mother of Buddhas" (Sanskrit: बुद्धमातृ, romanized: Buddhamātṛ) or "The Great Mother" (Tibetan: ཡུམ་ཆེན་མོ, Wylie: Yum chen mo).

She is a central figure in Vajrayana and appears in various sutra and tantra Buddhist sources, like the Heart Sutra, Sādhanamāla, Niṣpannayogāvali, the Caṇḍamahāroṣaṇa tantra, Dhāranisamuccaya, Mañjusrimūlakalpa, and the Vairocanābhisaṃbodhi Sūtra.

Prajñāpāramitā Devī was widely depicted in Indian Buddhist art from around the 9th to 12th centuries, particularly in the art of the Pala Empire. She is also widely found in the Buddhist art of other regions like Java, Cambodia, Tibet and in the Himalayas. Himalayan and Tibetan art may depict her as either a bodhisattva or as a Buddha.

== In India ==
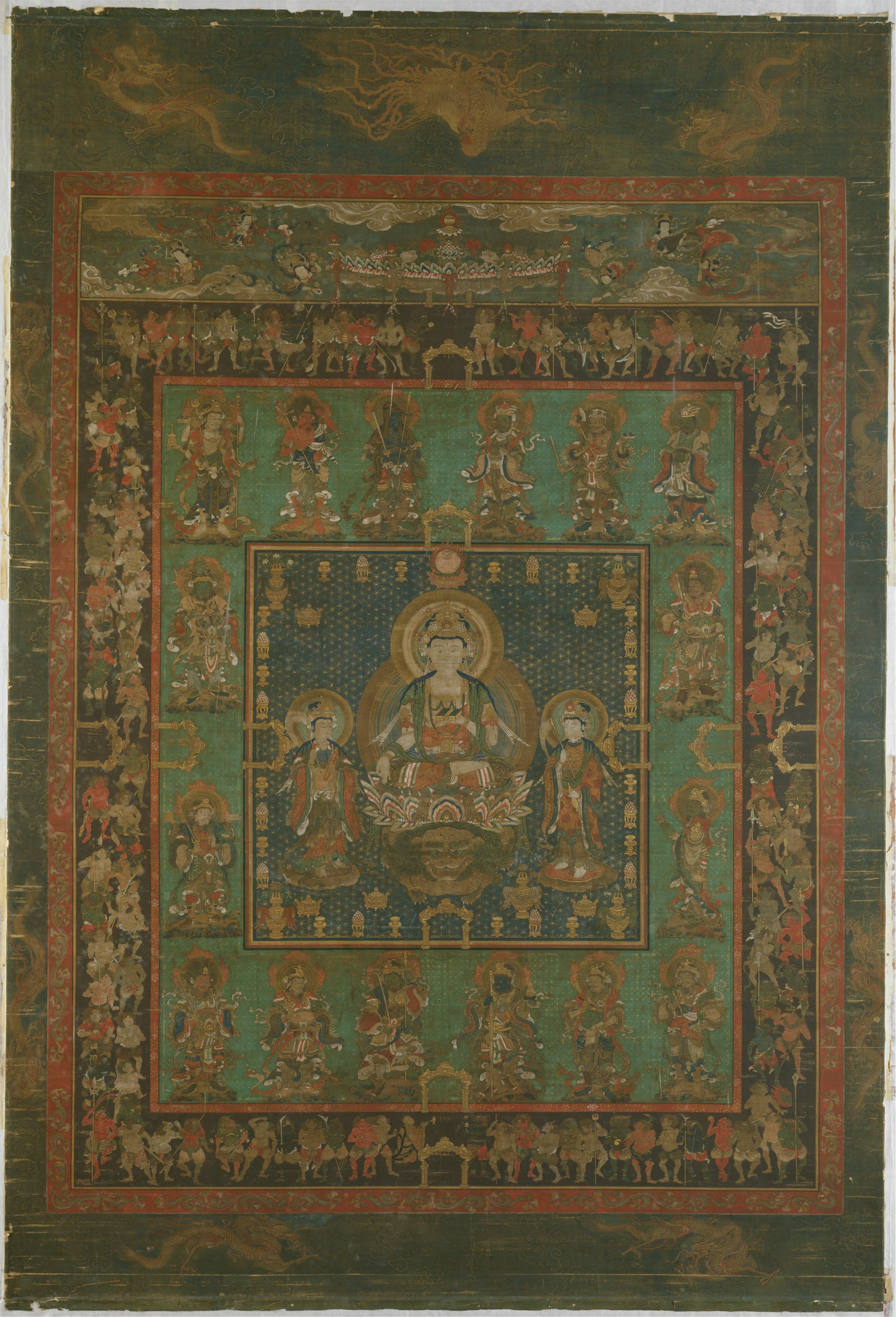
Japanese mandala of Prajñāpāramitā bodhisattva (Jp: Hannya bosatsu), 14th century, MET.

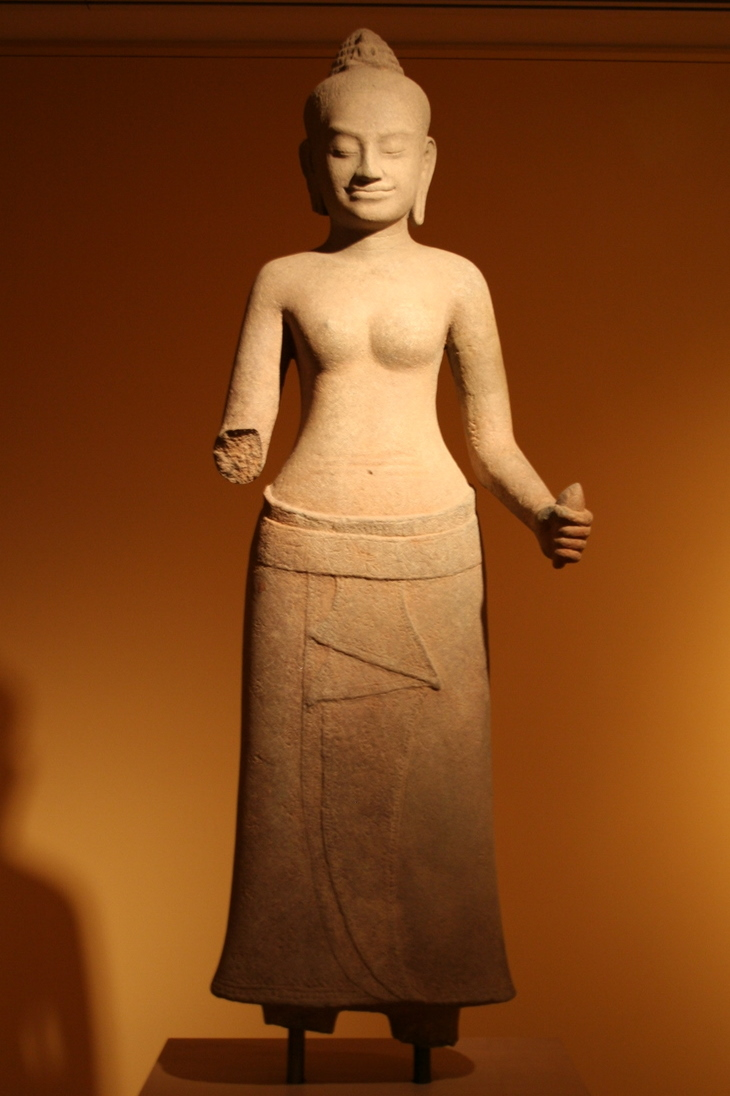
Prajñāpāramitā, Cambodia, Bayon style, ca. 1200, Sandstone

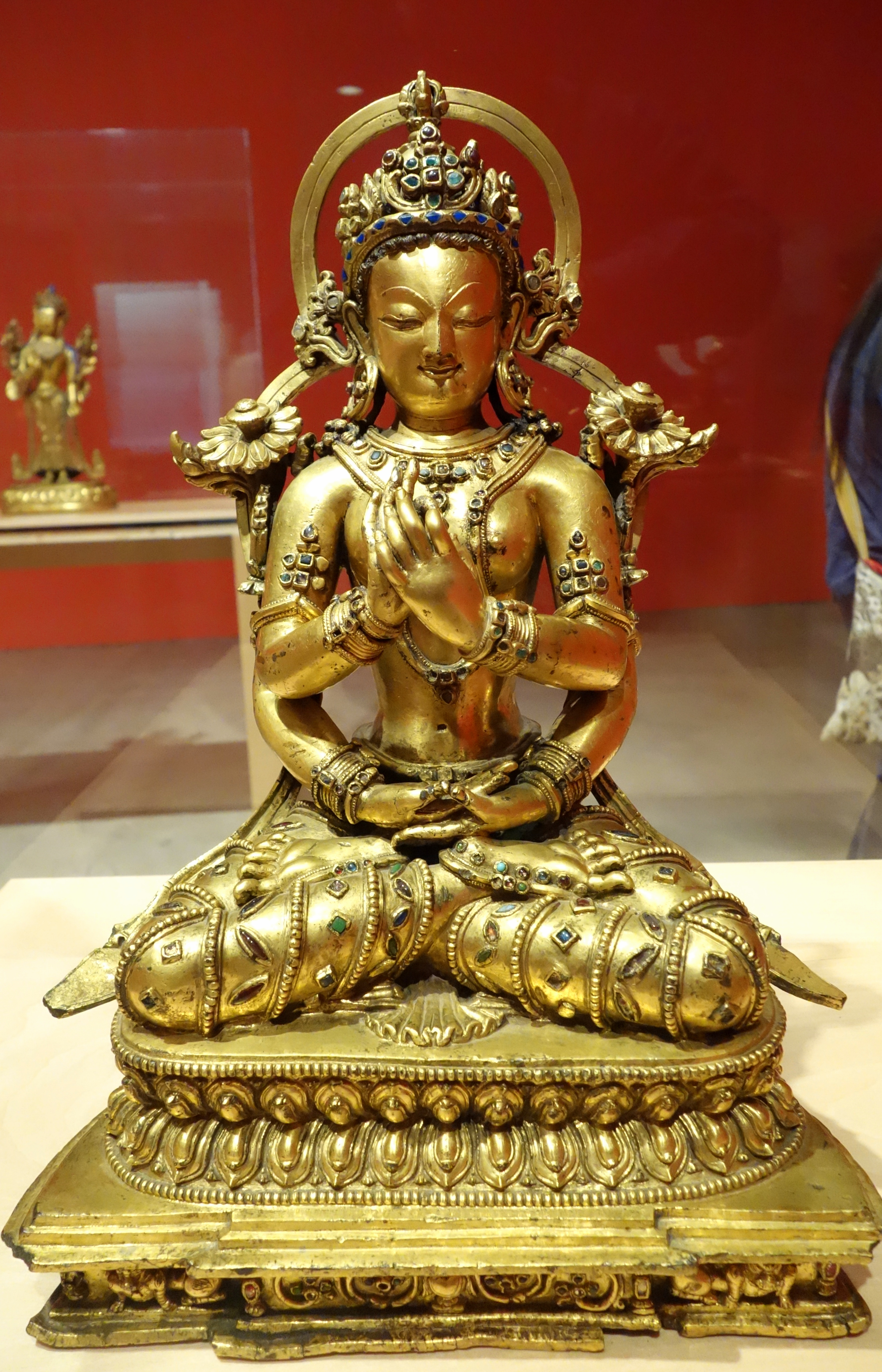
Prajñāpāramitā, Tibet, 15th century, gilt bronze, Berkeley Art Museum

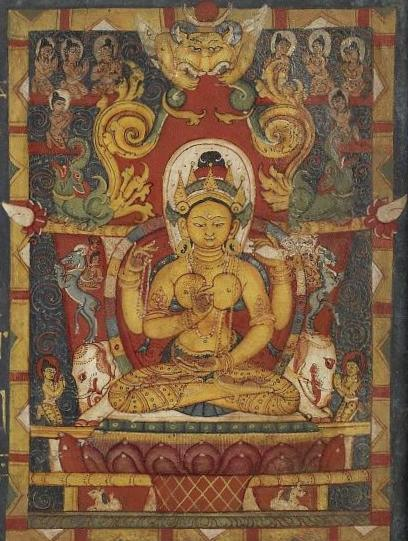
Illustration of Prajñāpāramitā Devi in a 13th century Tibetan manuscript

In Indian Mahayana Buddhism, worship of the Prajñāpāramitā sutras (in the form of books, Sanskrit: pustaka) was already an important element which is found in the sutras themselves. The Aṣṭasāhasrikā Prajñāpāramitā Sūtra teaches the worship of the sutra on an altar with flowers, lamps, incense and so forth. The Prajñāpāramitā sutras also reference themselves as the highest object of study and worship, claiming that studying, reciting, and worshiping them is superior to worshiping stupas, Buddha relics, and other objects. This is because Prajñāpāramitā, the transcendent knowledge that sees all phenomena as illusory and unborn, is the true source of Buddhahood, the "mother" of all Buddhas and bodhisattvas.

According to Jacob Kinnard, these sutras even present the physical book form of a Prajñāpāramitā sutra as akin to the Buddha's rūpakāya (physical form to be worshiped, like his relics) as well as his dharmakāya (which contains the Dharma, the Buddha's teachings).

A further development in this form of worship occurred when the Prajñāpāramitā scriptures, along with the concept of Prajñāpāramitā itself (a transcendent and perfect wisdom that leads to Buddhahood) became personified as a specific bodhisattva-devi (female bodhisattva-goddess) called Prajñāpāramitā Devī (beginning circa 7th to 8th century CE).

=== In Buddhist texts ===
According to Miranda Shaw, the Aṣṭasāhasrikā Prajñāpāramitā contains verses which seem to personify the concept of "the perfection of wisdom" (which in Sanskrit is a feminine noun - prajña) as a mother and teacher:

She is the Perfect Wisdom that never comes into being, and therefore never goes out of being.

She is known as the Great Mother....She is the Perfect Wisdom who gives birthless birth to all Buddhas.

And through these sublimely Awakened Ones, it is Mother Prajñāpāramitā alone who turns the wheel of true teaching."

As Lamotte notes, the Aṣṭasāhasrikā Prajñāpāramitā presents Prajñāpāramitā as a mother figure in the following passage:

O Subhūti, it is like a woman who has many sons; if she falls sick, all her sons expend great effort to remove all danger of death from their mother. Why? Because, they say, we have been brought up by her; she has accomplished difficult tasks for us; for us she is the giver of life and the revealer of the Loka (taken here in the sense of ‘world’). Similarly, O Subhūti, the Tathāgatas have the same regard for this Prajñāpāramitā. Why? Because she is the mother, the parent of the Tathāgatas; for us she is the indicator of Omniscience and the revealer of the Loka (lokasaṃdarśayitrī, a designation here of the five skandhas).... The five skandhas, as long as they are not broken or disintegrated, are designated here by the Prajñāpāramitā by the name of Loka. What does that say? They are designated as not breaking up and not disintegrating. Indeed, O Subhūti, since the five skandhas do not exist in inherent nature, they have emptiness as nature, and this very emptiness does not break up, does not disintegrate. Thus the Prajñāpāramitā of the Tathāgatas is the revealer of the Loka [understood in this way]. And the signlessness, the wishlessness, the inactivity, the non-arising, the non-existing, the fundamental element, they also, do not break up, do not disintegrate. Therefore, O Subhūti, the Prajñāpāramitā of the Tathāgatas is the revealer of the Loka [understood in this way].

According to Shaw, Prajñāpāramitā was "regarded as the 'mother' of all beings who attain enlightenment, for it is her wisdom that engenders liberation. She is the supreme teacher and eternal font of revelation...Even Buddhas and bodhisattvas pay homage to her, because to her they owe their omniscience." As such, one of her main titles is "Mother of All Buddhas" (sarva-buddha-mata) and is said to be "the genetrix, the mother of the victorious ones" (jinas, i.e. all Buddhas) in the Aṣṭasāhasrikā.

The Aṣṭasāhasrikā even states that Buddhas "owe their existence" to her and claims that worshiping her is superior to worshiping stupas or Buddha relics.

The idea of the perfection of wisdom as a being like a mother is also mentioned in the Dà zhìdù lùn (Great Prajñāpāramitā Commentary) translated by Kumarajiva. The text states:

Moreover, the prajñāpāramitā is the mother of the Buddhas (buddhamātṛ). The task (yatna, śrama) of the mother is greater than that of the father. This is why the Buddha considers prajñā as his mother, and the Pratyutpannasamādhi as his father.

=== Worship ===
Worship of the goddess may have been witnessed in India by the Chinese pilgrim Faxian (337–422 CE) who mentions that Mahayanists worshiped Prajñāpāramitā, Manjusri and Avalokiteshvara. However, it is not clear what Faxian saw in India, and some scholars argue this passage is a reference to the worship of the sutra, not an image of the goddess. The earliest images of the deity are from Ellora Caves and date to the 7th century.

An early source on Prajñāpāramitā as a devi is Rāhulabhadra's Prajñāpāramitā stotra which is quoted by the Dà zhìdù lùn (The Treatise on the Great Prajñāpāramitā). This stotra (ode) describes the devi as follows:

Between you who are so rich in holy qualities and the Buddha, the teacher of the world, honest people see no more difference than between the moon and the light of the moon. Of all the heroes who have dedicated themselves to the good of others, you are the nourisher, the generator and the tender mother. Since the Buddhas, the compassionate teachers of the world, are your own sons, you are, thus, O virtuous one, the grandmother of all beings. Singular although multiform, you are invoked everywhere under various names by the Tathāgatas, in the presence of beings to be converted. Like dew-drops in contact (with starlight) at the blazing rays, the faults and opinions of the theoreticians dissolve at your touch. In your terrifying aspect, you give rise to fear among fools; in your friendly aspect, you give rise to faith in the wise. If he who is clasped to you is not recognized as your husband, how, O mother, would he experience love or hate for another object? You do not come from anywhere and you do not go anywhere; in whatever place there may be, you are not seen by the wise. The person who sees you is fettered, the person who does not see you is also fettered; the person who sees you is liberated, the person who does not see you is also liberated. Oh! You are astounding, you are profound and glorious; you are very difficult to cognize; like a magic show, you are seen and you are not seen.

As a fully developed goddess, she appears in the Sādhanamālā (late eleventh or early twelfth century) which describes various forms of the devi.

=== Iconography ===
Shaw describes the common way that the devi is depicted in Indian art as follows:

Prajñāpāramitā is envisioned most often as golden in color and alternately as white. She appears with either two arms or four. As is typical of Mahayana goddesses, Prajñāpāramitā is decked in divine raiment, gems, and a jeweled diadem. Her tiara is sometimes described as a five-Buddha crown, signifying that she encompasses all aspects of enlightened knowledge. She sits in the cross-legged posture of meditative equipoise. Her hands are typically brought together at her heart in a teaching gesture known as vyākhyāna mudrā. The thumb and forefinger of her left hand form a circle, representing the wheel of Dharma. Some portion of her right hand touches the wheel, signifying its turning and thus symbolizing the revelation of religious truths. Her identifying attribute is the Perfection of Wisdom text that she bears, supported on a lotus or clasped in an upraised hand. A popular manner of envisioning and portraying the goddess, in India and beyond, is the two-armed form in which she makes a teaching gesture and clasps the stem of a lotus in each hand. The lotuses blossom above her shoulders and support a pair of Perfection of Wisdom scriptures.

=== In Tantric Buddhism ===
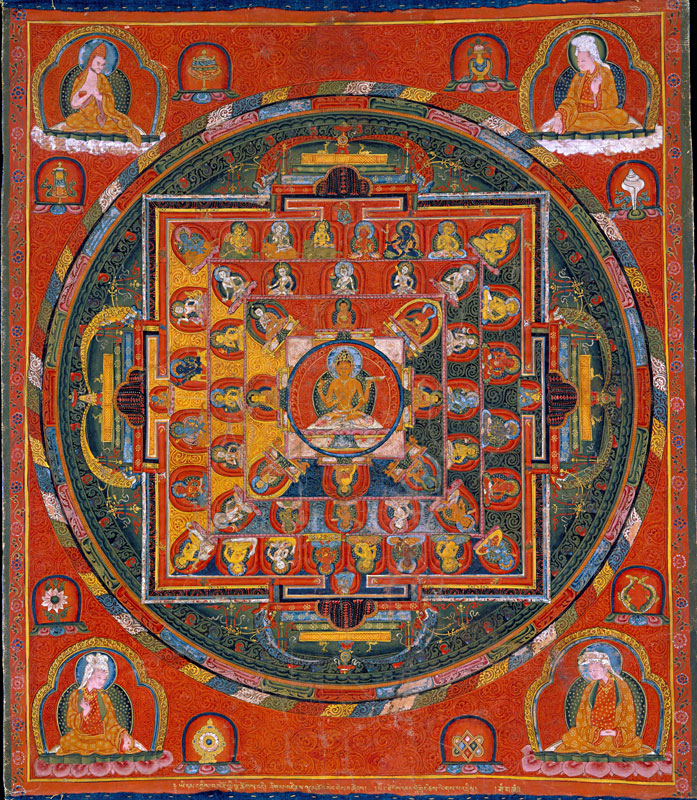
Tibetan tantric mandala of Prajñaparamita Devi

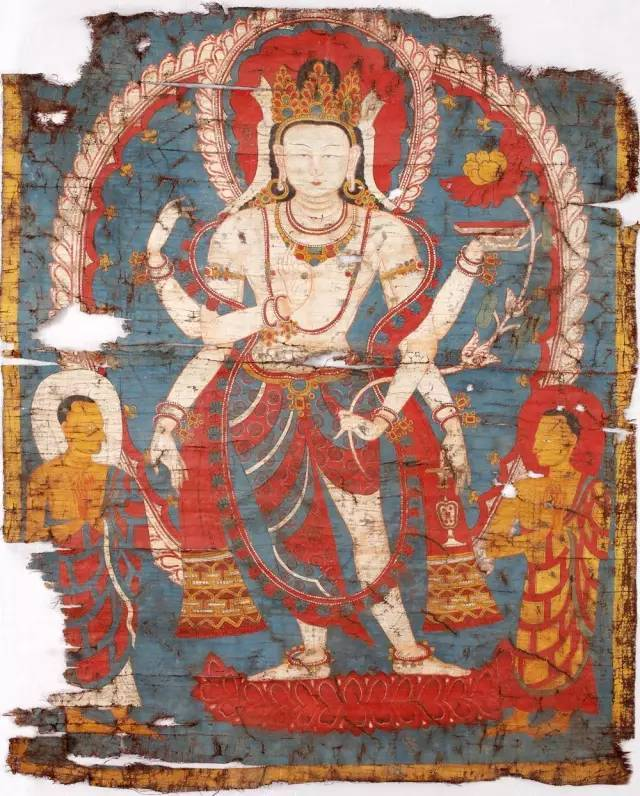
Ancient painting of Six-Armed Prajnaparamita

In Tantric Buddhism (Vajrayana) the concept of Prajñāpāramitā (and the feminine deity) took on further esoteric associations. According to James B. Apple, in Vajrayana, Prajñāpāramitā Devī "represented the prototype and essence of all the female figures in Tantric interplay". She is represented by the ritual bell (ghanta), lotus (padma) and by yoginis (female yogis). In tantric contemplative rites called sādhanās ("means of achievement"), a yogi would visualize the deity and recite mantras.

Tantric Buddhism also saw Prajñāpāramitā as being present in all women and promoted an attitude of respect and veneration for the feminine form. As such, all women were seen as embodiments of Prajñāpāramitā. This attitude is promoted by the mahasiddha Laksminkara in her Adhvayasiddhi which states:

One must not denigrate women, in whatever social class they are born, for they are Lady Perfection of Wisdom (Prajñāpāramitā), embodied in the phenomenal realm.

The Sādhanamālā, an important compendium of contemplative rites, contains nine Prajñāpāramitādevi sādhanās (meditative rituals with mantras and visualizations of deities). Asanga is said to have composed a Sadhana for her.

In the Sādhanamālā, Prajñāpāramitādevi appears in three main forms:

- Sitaprajñāpāramitā - A white skinned goddess with Akṣobhya Buddha on her crown. She sits in the Vajraparyankasana pose on a white lotus, and carries a red lotus in one hand and a scripture in the other.
- Pītaprajñāpāramitā - A yellow skinned goddess with Akṣobhya Buddha on her crown. She makes the Vyākhyānamudrā gesture with both hands. A lotus rising up in her left side holds the Prajñāpāramitā scripture.
- Kanakaprajñāpāramitā - Golden in color, she is identical to the above depiction but her two hands make the Dharmacakra mudra.

In later sources like the 11th-century Niṣpannayogāvalī of Abhayākaragupta, she retains a golden color but appears with four arms.

Later tantric sadhanas written for the Heart Sutra are often focused on Prajñāpāramitādevi.

Depictions of Prajñāpāramitā Devī are most common in the art of the north Indian Pala Empire (r. 750–1161 CE). According to Kinnard, when it comes to this era, "images of Prajñāpāramitā have been discovered at virtually all of the monastic sites in northeastern India." Depictions of Prajñāpāramitā Devī are also found in Tibetan art, East Asian Buddhist art, Javanese art and Cambodian art.

=== Mantras ===
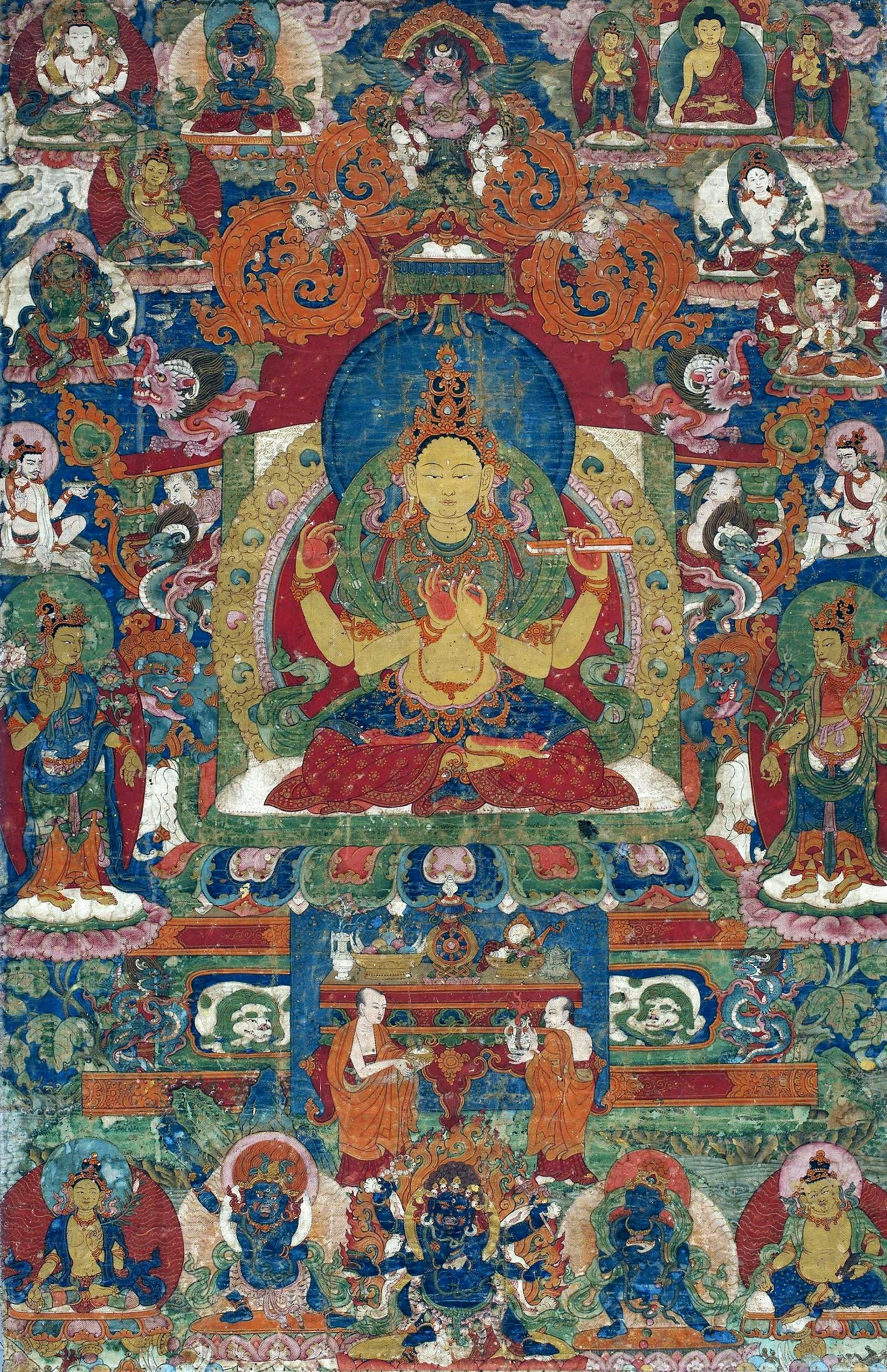
Nepalese thangka of the devi holding a sutra and a mala (prayer beads) used to recite mantras, c. 17–18th century

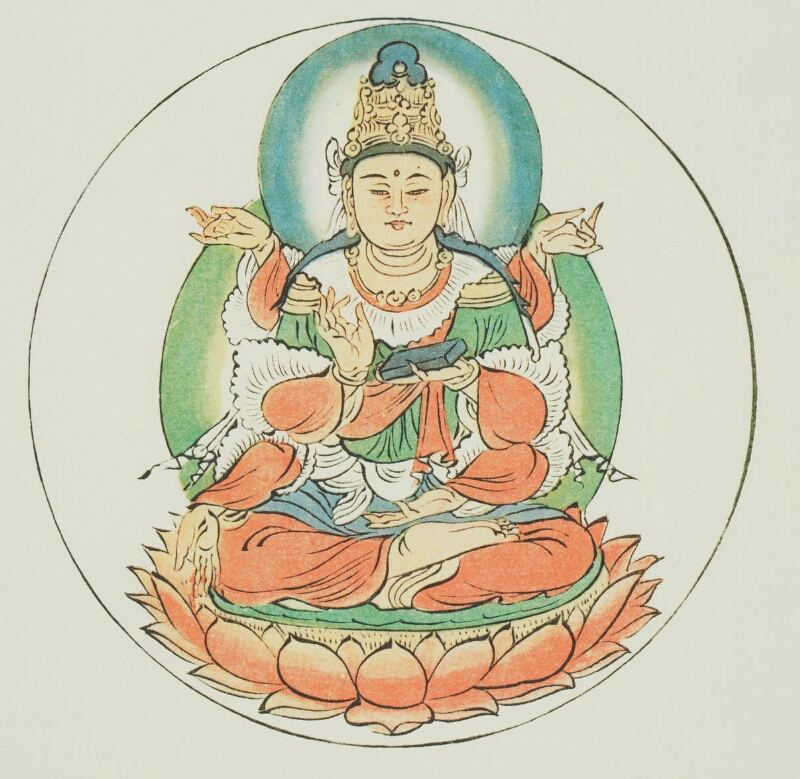
East Asian style Prajñāpāramitā with six arms

Various Prajñāpāramitā sūtras contain mantras for the devi, for example, the Candragarbha prajñāpāramitā contains the following mantra:

oṃ prajñe prajñe mahāprajñe candra-prajñe sarvaśāsakari svāhā

Oṃ Wisdom Wisdom Great Wisdom Moon Wisdom Ruler of All Svāhā

Various sutras like the Saptaśatikā prajñāpāramitā begin with the following invocation mantra:

oṃ namo bhagavatyai āryaprajñāpāramitāyai

oṃ homage to the blessed noble perfection of wisdom

The Ekaślokikā prajñāpāramitā contains the following homage and mantra:

namo bhagavatyai āryaprajñāpāramitāyai (sa)kalamahāyānāgryadharmatāyai ||

tadyathā | oṃ dhīḥ hṛīḥ śrīḥ śruti-smṛti-vijaye svāhā |

The mantra here (after tadyathā - "thus", "namely" which indicates the beginning of the mantra) is made up of seed syllables (bijas), such as the bija of wisdom (dhīḥ) and the bija of compassion (hrīḥ) along with the words "śruti" (hearing), "smṛti" (mindfulness/remembering), and "vijaye" (victorious).

The Kauśikaprajñāpāramitā contains many mantras, such as:

- gaṅgā gaṅgā na tīrāvabhāsa gaṅgā svāhā
- śrīye śrīye muni śrīye śrīyase svāhā
- oṃ vajra-bale svāhā
- oṃ hrī śrī dhī śruti smṛti mati gati vijaye svāhā
- gate gate pāragate pārasaṃgate bodhi svāhā

The last mantra is also found in the famous Heart Sutra and is perhaps the most famous prajñāpāramitā mantra.

There are various mantras listed in the Sādhanamālā (SM) for Prajñāpāramitādevi. Her bija mantra is most commonly DHĪḤ. The most common mantra in the SM for the deity is: oṃ dhīḥ śruti smṛti vijaye svāhā (which is also found in a work by Amoghavajra, Taisho no. 1151). Another common PP devi mantra in these sadhanas (SM151 to SM160) is:

oṁ picu picu prajñāvardhani jvala jvala medhāvardhani dhiri dhiri buddhivardhani svāhā

Oṁ, picu, picu! Increaser of wisdom, burn, burn! Increaser of knowledge, dhiri, dhiri! Increaser of intelligence, svāhā!

This mantra is also found in the Caṇḍamahāroṣaṇa tantra. This mantra is also given in sadhanas to Vajra Saraswati in the Sādhanamālā. Saraswati is an Indian goddess associated with speech, eloquence and wisdom which was also venerated by Buddhists. According to Sarah Shaw, she shares an affinity with Prajñāpāramitādevi.

The Sādhanamālā also contains a sadhana which is said to be by Asanga, it gives the following seed syllable based mantra for Prajñāpāramitādevi:

OṂ ĀḤ DHĪḤ HUṂ SVĀ HĀ.

The Vasudhārādhāraṇī and the Saṃpuṭatantra both contain the following Prajñāpāramitā Devi mantra: oṃ prajñe mahāprajñe śrutismṛtivijaye svāhā.

== Related deities ==
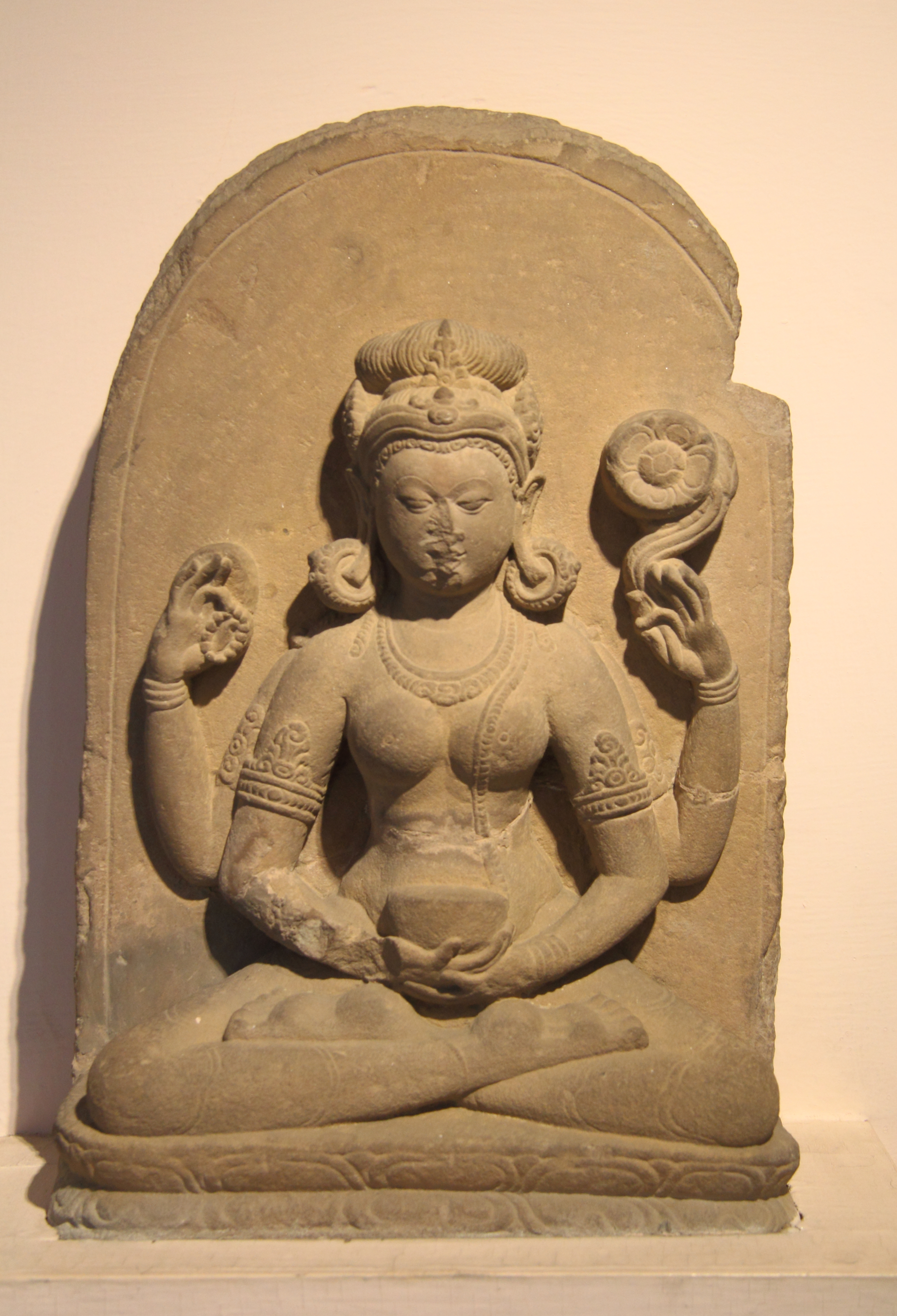
Prajñāpāramitā or Cundā (the statue is difficult to disambiguate) from Sarnath (Uttar Pradesh), 11th century CE.

Some scholars have called attention to the similarities between Prajñāpāramitā Devi and other Buddhist deities such as Cundā (Cundī), and Tara. Kinnard sees Prajñāpāramitā Devi as being part of a set of deities he terms "prajñā deities", deities associated with wisdom, like Mañjuśrī and Cundā. Prajñā deities are usually depicted with sutras in the form of books (pustakas) and they often make the dharmacakrapravartana (turning the dharmawheel) mudrā.

Cundā, also a wisdom deity, is often called "mother of the seventy million Buddhas" (saptakoṭibuddhamatṛ) and as such shares the "mother of Buddhas" moniker with Prajñāpāramitā Devi. Her artistic depictions are often indistinguishable from Prajñāpāramitā Devi, and scholars like Kinnard argue that this ambiguity may have been intentional.

Sometimes, other female deities may share a mantra with the devi, like Saraswati (see above) and Vasudhara (the Vasudhārādhāraṇī contains two mantras which name Prajñāpāramitā Devi, e.g.: oṃ śrīprajñāpāramite svāhā). Regarding the Buddhist Saraswati, in some depictions, she is said to be carrying a Prajñāpāramitā sutra.

Likewise, Mañjuśrī, he is depicted with similar symbols as Prajñāpāramitā Devi, such as a book, lotuses topped with books, and a sword (representing the sharpness of wisdom). In some sources, Prajñāpāramitā and Mañjuśrī are paired together, such as in the mandala of the Jñānapada Guhyasamājatantra tradition.

Tara is often considered to be an emanation of Prajñāpāramitā Devī in Tibetan Buddhism. She is also often called "mother of all tathagatas" in some sources, such as in the Tantra Which is the Source for All the Functions of Tara, Mother of All the Tathagatas.

== In Indo-Tibetan Buddhism ==
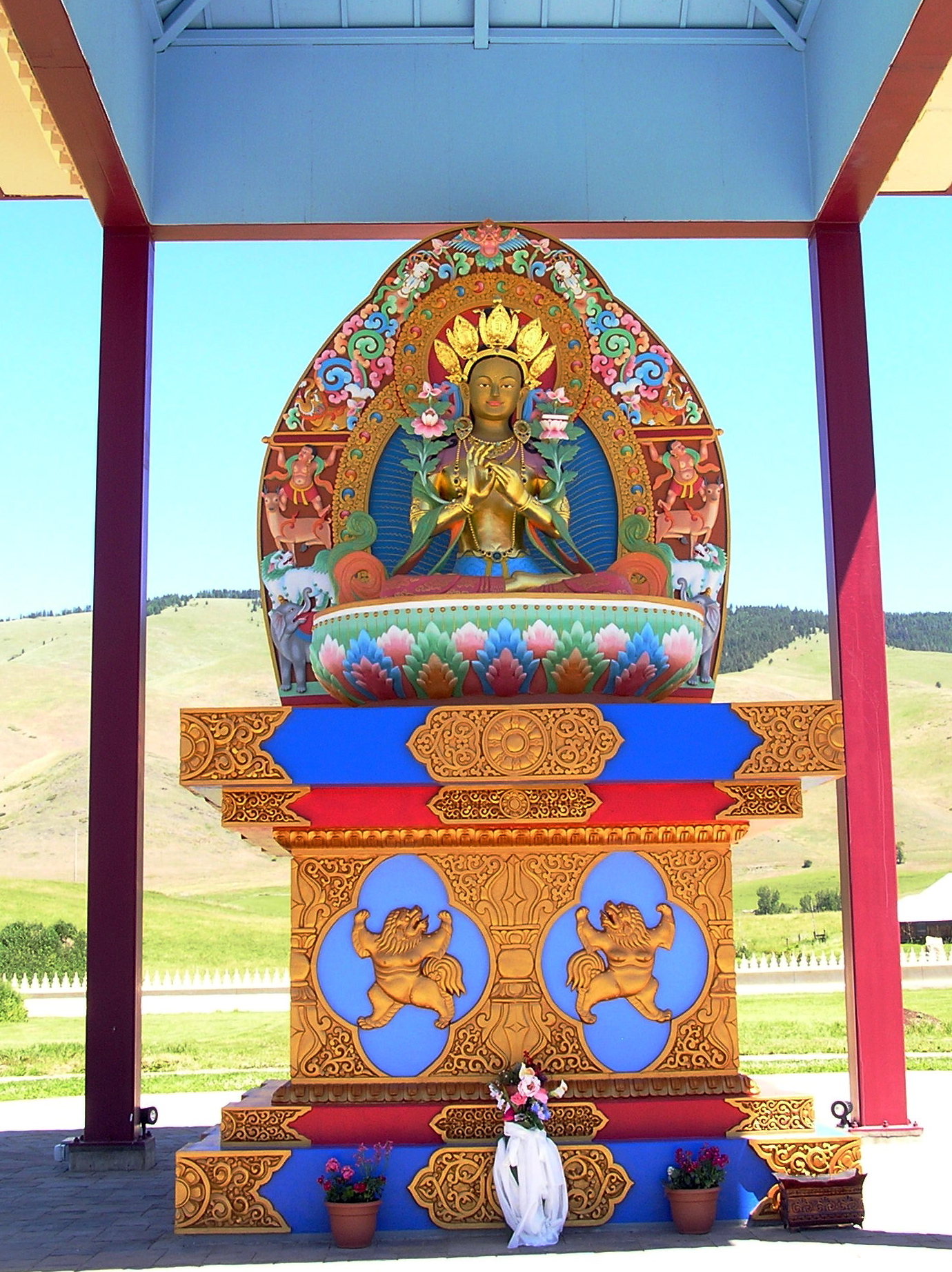
Tibetan style statue of Prajñāpāramitā at the Garden of One Thousand Buddhas, Montana, US

In the Indo-Tibetan Buddhism of the Himalayan region, Prajñāpāramitā Devī (Tibetan: ཤེས་རབ་ཀྱི་ཕ་རོལ་ཏུ་ཕྱིན་མ, abbr. ཤེར་ཕྱིན་མ, Wylie: shes rab kyi pha rol tu phyin ma, abbr. sher phyin ma) is "the great mother of dharmakaya, the female Buddha". According to Tulku Urgyen, she is the feminine aspect of the Adi-Buddha, ultimate truth, called Samantabhadri, the "empty quality of luminous wakefulness."

According to Shaw, meditation and ritual practices centering on Prajñāpāramitā are still common in Tibetan Buddhism, especially among the Sarma (New Translation) schools.

Out of the Dharmakaya Prajñāpāramitā emanate five female Buddhas: Dhatvishvari, Mamaki, Buddhalocana, Pandaravasini, and Samayatara. Vajravarahi is also another female Buddha which is considered to be a sambhoghakaya emanation from Prajñāpāramitā Devī."

The goddess Tara is also considered a nirmanakaya emanation body from Prajñāpāramitā. Indeed, the Dharmakaya as Prajñāpāramitā Devī is the ground of all female Buddhas and all dakinis (sacred feminine deities), including the great Tibetan yogini Yeshe Tsogyal.

As such, she is called the "mother" (Tibetan: ཡུམ, Wylie: yum), and is an important deity in the Chöd lineage of the Tibetan female lama Machig Labdrön (circa 1055–1149). According to Jerome Edou "In the biography of Machig, Prajnaparamita is called Yum Chenmo, the Great Mother, spontaneous Dharmakaya free of origination, existence and cessation. She appears as a four-armed deity, seated in meditation posture, adorned with many attributes..."

Machig Labdrön describes Prajñāpāramitā Devī as follows:

The Primordial Mother, Yum Chenmo, is the ultimate nature of all phenomena, emptiness, suchness [Skt. dharmata], free from the two veils. She is the pure essence of the sphere of emptiness, the insight of the non-self. She is the matrix who gives birth to all the Buddhas of the three times. However, to give beings the opportunity to accumulate spiritual merits, she manifests herself as an object of veneration.

== In Nepalese Buddhism ==
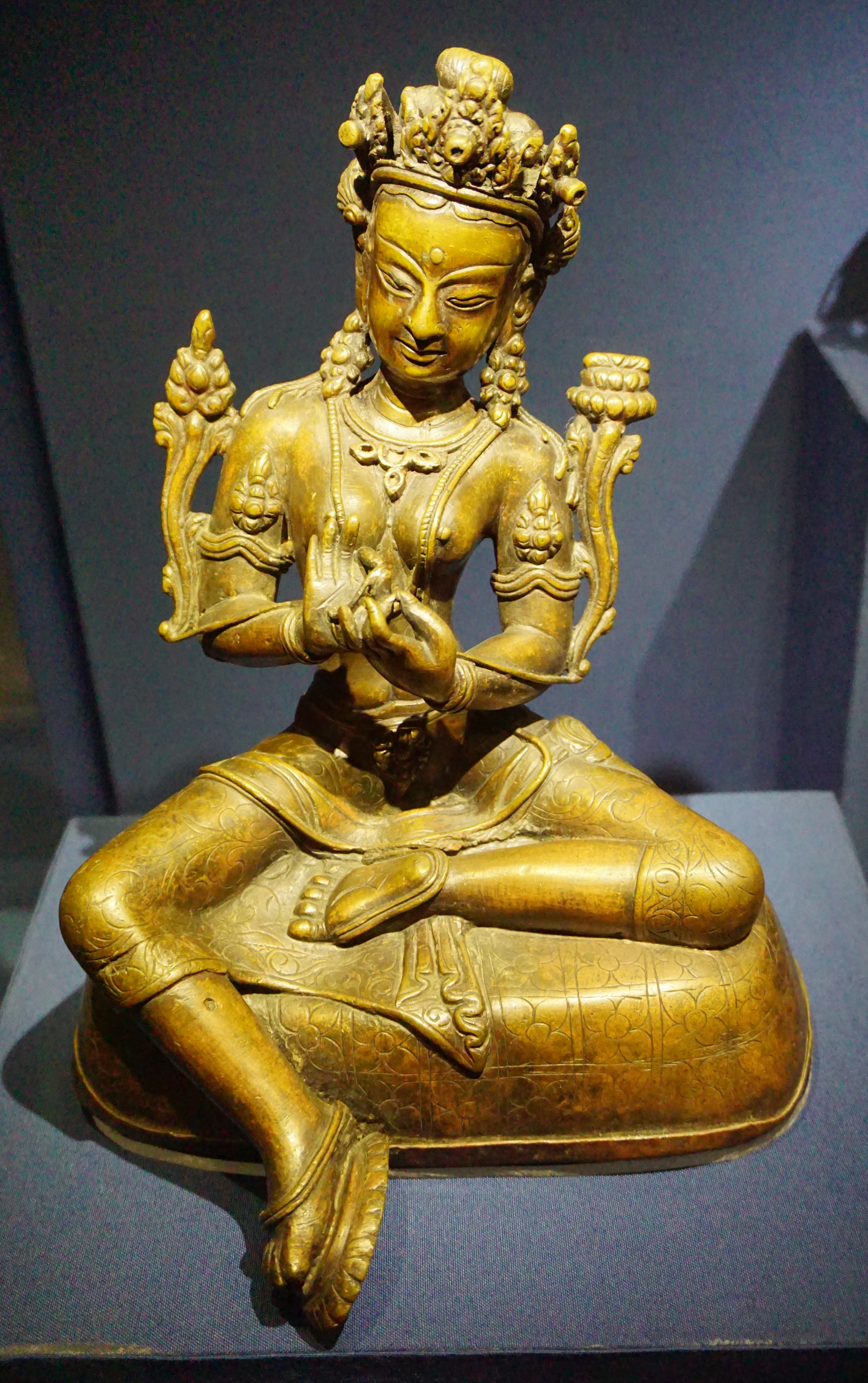
Nepalese statue of Prajñāpāramitā devi, 17th century

Prajñāpāramitā Devī remains an important object of worship in the Newar Buddhism of Nepal. In Newar Buddhism, Prajñāpāramitā devi is commonly worshiped through the ritual reading of the Prajñāpāramitā sutras along with votive offerings which are often done to Prajñāpāramitā manuscripts.

Prajñāpāramitā Devī as is a central object of devotion at the Hiraṇyavarṇa Mahāvihāra (Gold-colored Great Monastery, also known as Kwa Baha) in Lalitpur, Nepal. Here, she is worshiped throughout the year in the form of a large lavish 13th century copy of the Aṣṭasāhasrikā Prajñāpāramitā Sūtra. According to Shaw, "David Gellner, who conducted extensive field research at Kwa Baha, was advised that "the goddess herself is present" in the text and observes that the text is revered "as a goddess in the minds of her devotees."

Nepalese devotees worship the goddess seeking healing, success in education and business and for positive (karmic) merit.

== In Cambodia ==
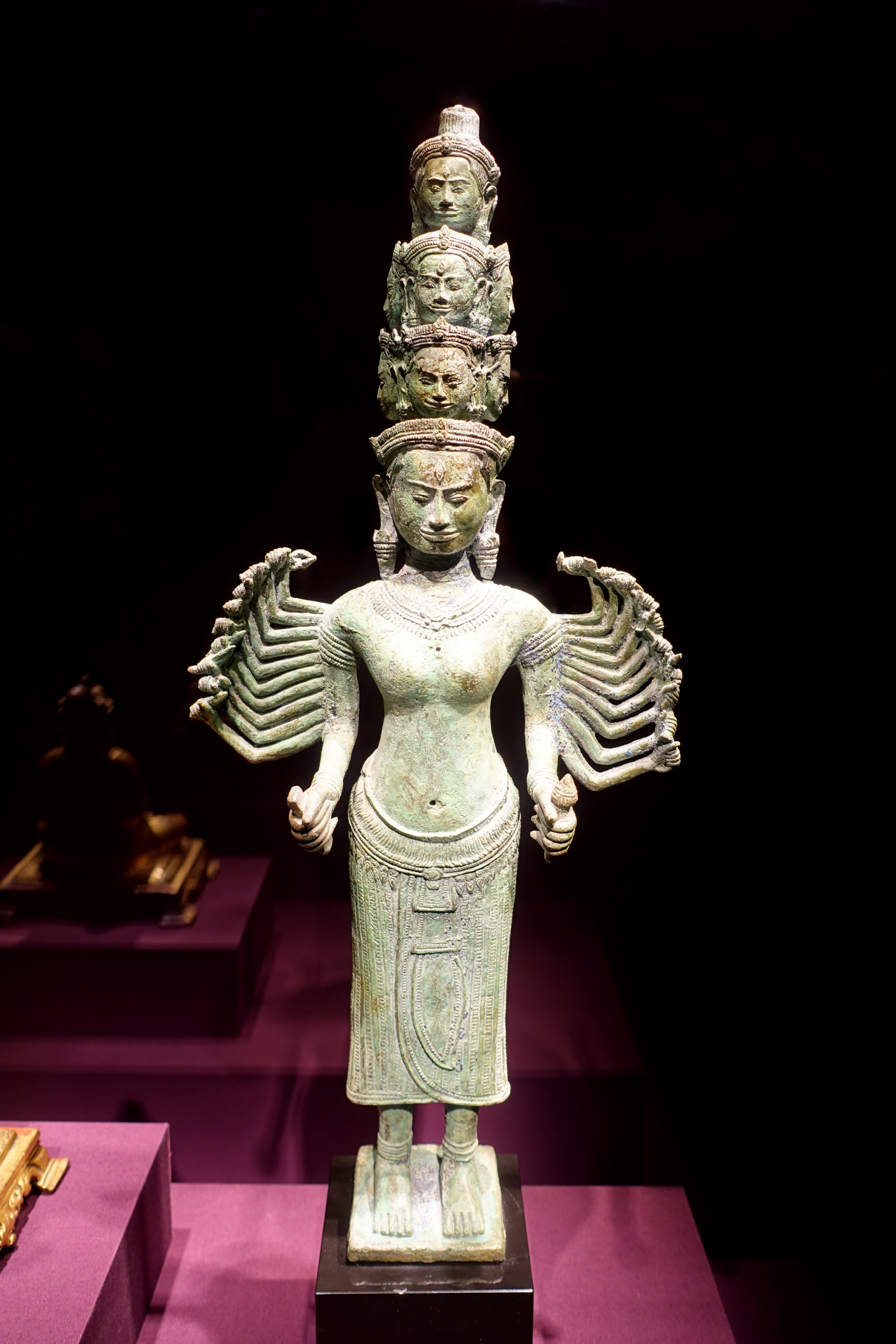
Cambodian Prajñāpāramitā, Bayon style, Angkor period, c. 1200 CE

Prajñāpāramitā Devī was a popular deity in the Mahāyāna Buddhism of Cambodia's Khmer Empire (c. 802–1431), a Southeast Asian empire which supported Mahāyāna for generations.

Numerous Prajñāpāramitā Devī statues survive in Cambodia and many of them are quite different from the South Asian depictions of the deity. Some of them seem to show a more "esoteric" form of the deity, often with many arms (one specimen sports 22 arms). Cambodian Prajñāpāramitās are often found in a triad with the Buddha and Avalokiteśvara.

Other evidence for the importance of the devi in Cambodia comes from hymns to her, often found at the beginning of inscriptions. Some of these call her the mother of the Buddhas and depict her as being able to bestow insight and liberation.

== In Ancient Indonesia ==
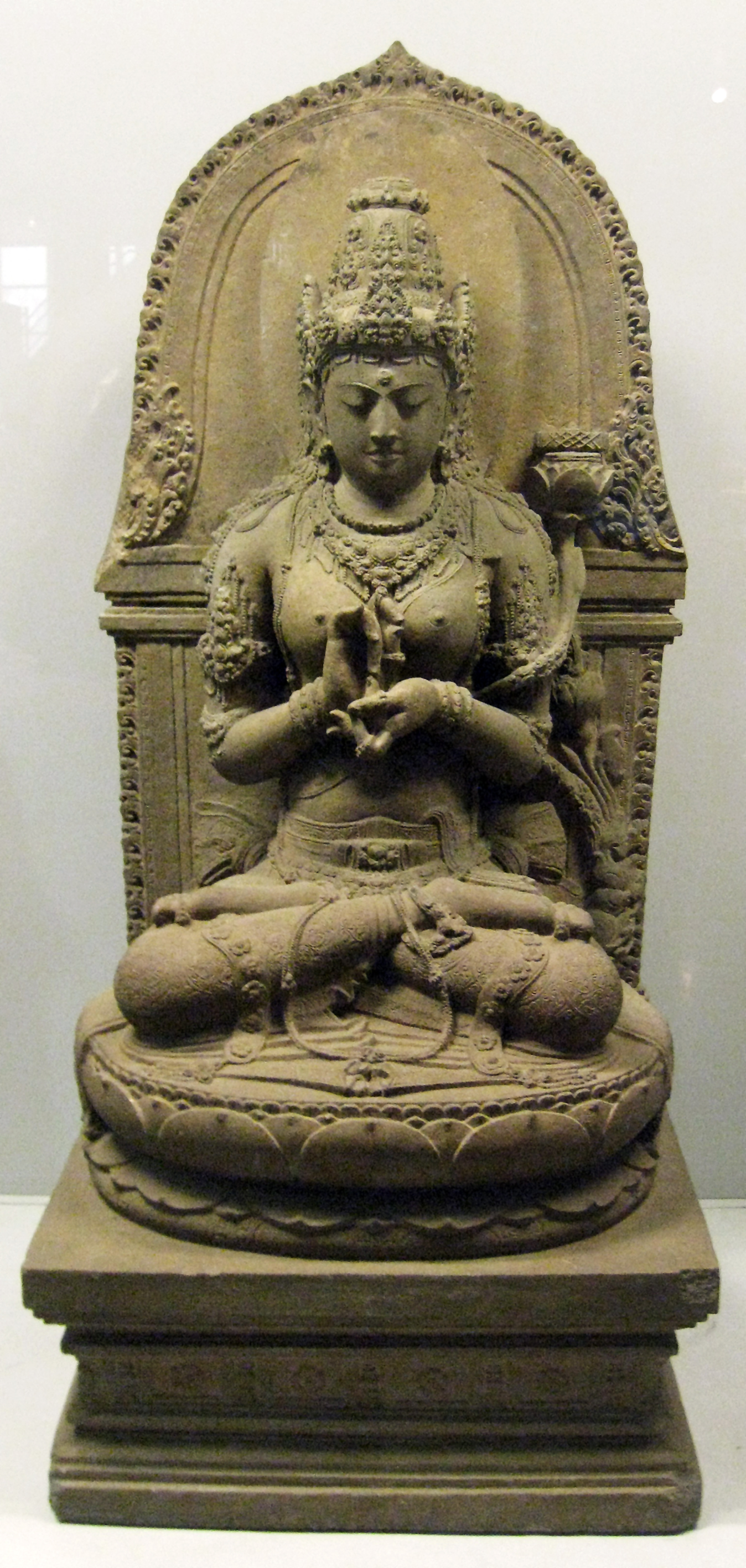
The famed Prajñāpāramitā of Java

Mahayana Buddhism took root in Java during the Sailendra dynasty (8th century CE). The 8th-century Kalasan temple in Central Java contains an image that has been identified as the related goddess Tara, which shares some similarities with Prajñāpāramitā Devi, such as being deemed mother of Buddhas.

The Sailendra dynasty was also the ruling family of Srivijaya in Sumatra. During the reign of the third Pala king Devapala (815–854) in India, Srivijaya Maharaja Balaputra of Sailendras also constructed one of Nalanda's main monasteries in India itself. Thereafter manuscript editions of the Aṣṭasāhasrikā Prajñāpāramitā Sūtra circulating in Sumatra and Java instigated the cult of Prajñāpāramitā Devī.

In the 10th century, bronze sculptors produced several statues of Prajñāpāramitā in East Java, often paired with statues of Vairocana.

In the 13th century, Tantric Buddhism gained royal patronage of king Kertanegara of Singhasari. During the Singhasari and Majapahit eras, various statues of Prajñāpāramitā Devī statues were produced in Java and Sumatra. Several large statues have been found and studied by modern archeologists and scholars, indicating the importance of the deity in Java and Sumatra during the Singhasari and Majapahit eras.

Surviving examples include the Prajñāpāramitā of Singhasari in East Java and Prajñāpāramitā of Muaro Jambi, Sumatra. Both of East Java and Jambi Prajñāpāramitās bear resemblance in style as they were produced in same period; however, Prajñāpāramitā of Jambi is headless and was discovered in poor condition.

The Prajñāpāramitā of Java is probably the most famous depiction of the goddess of transcendental wisdom, and is considered the masterpiece of classical ancient Java Hindu-Buddhist art in Indonesia. It was discovered in the Cungkup Putri ruins near Singhasari temple, Malang, East Java. Today the statue is displayed on 2nd floor Gedung Arca, National Museum of Indonesia, Jakarta. In 1911, British art historian E.B. Havell described the statue as:

deserving to be considered as one of the highest spiritual creations of all art: sitting on the lotus throne, the symbol of purity and divine birth. In the pose of the yogini - her face has the ineffable expression of heavenly grace, like the Madonnas of Giovanni Bellini - Prajñāpāramitā, has the consort of the Adibuddha, would be seen as the mother of the universe.

== Interfaith links ==
Through comparative religious studies, modern scholars found that the concept of Prajnaparamita in Buddhism has many similarities with the concept of Wisdom(Sophia) in the Old Testament, as both are considered to be the true nature of all phenomena, the true essence of all existences, the eternal mother that gives birth to all beings, and the transcendental wisdom leading to the ultimate Truth.

== See also ==
- Adi Parashakti - supreme feminine principle in Hinduism
- Sophia - the transcendental wisdom as a feminine principle
- Tao - East Asian philosophy concept that represents the Ultimate Reality.
- Saraswati - Indian goddess of wisdom also worshiped in Buddhism
- Benzaiten - the Japanese Saraswati
- Mother goddess
- Athena - Greek wisdom goddess
- Minerva - Roman wisdom goddess
- Ultimate reality - the highest truth in different cultures and belief systems
