= Mater Dei Academy =

Location
- Farranferris Education and Training Campus, Redemption Road, Cork; Ireland
- Coordinates: 51.91177°N 8.47778°W

Information
- Type: Independent
- Motto: Latin: Vias tuas Domine demonstra mihi (Lord teach me thy ways)
- Religious affiliation: Roman Catholic
- Established: 2020
- Principal: Geraldine Heffernan
- Gender: Mixed
- Enrollment: 50 (2024)
- Website: materdeiacademy.ie

Mater Dei Academy is an independent Catholic secondary school in Cork, Ireland. As of 2024, it had 50 students enrolled, and was based in the Farranferris Education and Training Campus. The academy, which is funded by a Catholic foundation based in Virginia in the United States, also runs a home-schooling initiative known as "Mater Dei Education". The independent and private school, which is run by parents, is not subject to inspection by the Department of Education, and the volunteers that teach in the school are not required to hold any teaching qualifications.

== Background ==
Founded on 6 January 2020, the school opened in September 2020 and had 12 students in its first scholastic year. The school, which is parent-run, was originally based at St. Mary's Dominican Church and Priory on Popes Quay, Cork. In 2022, it moved to the Farranferris Education and Training Campus at the site of the former St Finbarr's College. The campus is also "home to a number of [other] education projects".

The school, being independent, does not receive Irish Government funding. It is funded by donations, including from the Saints and Scholars Foundation which is based in Front Royal, Virginia, USA. The Saints and Scholars Foundation, which describes the school as its main project, is associated with the American religious conservative political activist Connie Marshner. According to its founder, Mater Dei has also received some support from the Diocese of Cork and Ross and the Dominican Order in Cork.

Mater Dei Academy is not subject to governance or inspection by the Department of Education, and the volunteers who teach at the school are not required to hold teaching qualifications. It is registered, under the Alternative Education Assessment and Registration Service (AEARS), by the Child and Family Agency (Tusla).

In April 2023, Geraldine Heffernan was appointed principal of the school.

== Curriculum ==
Mater Dei's students take courses in theology, philosophy, the Irish language, English, Latin, mathematics, science, history and culture, geography, music, and art. At the Junior Cycle, the school follows the programme and takes the examinations of the Cambridge International General Certificate of Secondary Education (Cambridge IGCSE). Mater Dei is the only recognised Cambridge school in Ireland. According to its website, students from Mater Dei Academy can "sit the Irish Leaving Certificate examination as external candidates".

Alongside the academy, a home-schooling initiative was also established in 2020. This "Mater Dei Education" initiative was created to support parents who educate their primary-aged children at home. It provides lesson plans, learning resources, and also produces textbooks.
