= 2017 Adelaide Football Club season =

Adelaide Football Club
2017 season
- President: Andrew Fagan
- Coach: Don Pyke (AFL) (2nd season); Bec Goddard (AFLW) (1st season)
- Captains: Taylor Walker (AFL) (3rd season); Erin Phillips (AFLW) (1st season); Chelsea Randall (AFLW) (1st season)
- Home grounds: Adelaide Oval (AFL) (Capacity: 53,583); Marrara Oval (AFLW) (Capacity: 14,000); Norwood Oval (AFLW) (Capacity: 22,000); Thebarton Oval (AFLW) (Capacity: 15,000)
- AFL season: 1st
- Finals: 2nd
- Highest home attendance: 100,021 vs. Richmond (Grand Final)
- Lowest home attendance: 41,948 vs. Western Bulldogs (Round 16)

The 2017 Adelaide Football Club season was the 27th season in the Australian Football League and the first season in the AFL Women's competition contested by the Adelaide Football Club.

== AFL ==
=== List changes ===
Matthew Jaensch, who suffered a knee injury in round 7 of 2015, had not played a game for the rest of that season and decided to retire from AFL at the beginning of the 2016 season. Former captain Nathan van Berlo also decided to retire at the end of 2016 after struggling to get a spot in the AFL team. He finished out the season playing in the SANFL finals campaign. The Crows also delisted Luke Lowden and Keenan Ramsey at the end of the season.

The only trade that the Crows were involved in was that of midfielder Jarryd Lyons, who was traded to Gold Coast. After the trade period they delisted two more players: midfielder Mitch Grigg and utility Ricky Henderson. Henderson went on to be signed as a delisted free agent by Hawthorn. The final player to be dropped off of the senior list was Sam Shaw, who retired due to the effects concussion was having on his career. He was later re-drafted in the rookie draft to give him access to welfare assistance.

With the Crows' first pick in the national draft they selected Jordan Gallucci, a midfielder from Eastern Ranges in the TAC Cup. Originally this was selection 13, but it dropped to 15 due to bids made on academy players. Son of two-time Crows premiership player Darren Jarman, Ben Jarman, was eligible for the Crows to select him as a father–son selection. The Crows decided not to use this to select him in the national draft, but Jarman was overlooked and, when no club opted to take part in the 2017 pre-season draft, the Crows were able to select him automatically with their final selection in the rookie draft.

==== Retirements and delistings ====
**Player**	**Date**	**Reason**	**Career games**	**Career goals**	**Ref.**
Matthew Jaensch	26 February 2016	Retired	74	25	
Nathan van Berlo	5 September 2016	Retired	205	68	
Luke Lowden	23 September 2016	Delisted	1	3	
Keenan Ramsey	23 September 2016	Delisted	0	0	
Mitch Grigg	31 October 2016	Delisted	20	15	
Ricky Henderson	31 October 2016	Delisted	90	43	
Sam Shaw	9 November 2016	Retired (Note: Shaw retired due to ongoing concussion issues but was redrafted in the Rookie Draft for administrative reasons)	24	0	

==== Trades ====
**Date**	**Gained**	**From**	**Lost**	**Ref.**
20 October	Pick 43; Pick 67	Gold Coast	Jarryd Lyons; Pick 71	

==== National draft ====
**Round**	**Pick**	**Player**	**Recruited from**	**League**	**Ref.**
1	15	Jordan Gallucci	Eastern Ranges	TAC Cup	
3	44	Myles Poholke	Dandenong Stingrays	TAC Cup	
3	51	Elliott Himmelberg	Redland	NEAFL	
4	62	Matthew Signorello	Northern Knights	TAC Cup	
5	75	Ben Davis	UNSW	Sydney AFL	

==== Rookie draft ====
**Round**	**Pick**	**Player**	**Recruited from**	**League**	**Ref.**
1	13	Sam Shaw (Note: Shaw retired due to ongoing concussion issues but was redrafted in the Rookie Draft for administrative reasons)	Adelaide	AFL	
2	30	Passed			
3	45	Ben Jarman (Note: Ben Jarman was a father–son selection (son of Darren Jarman))	North Adelaide	SANFL	

=== Squad ===
Adelaide Football Club
Senior list		Rookie list	Coaching staff
2 Brad Crouch; 3 Riley Knight; 4 Josh Jenkins; 5 Scott Thompson (ret); 6 Jake Lever; 7 Jordan Gallucci; 8 Jake Kelly; 9 Rory Sloane (vc); 10 Harrison Wigg; 11 Paul Seedsman; 12 Daniel Talia; 13 Taylor Walker (c); 14 David Mackay; 15 Kyle Hartigan; 16 Luke Brown; 17 Curtly Hampton; 18 Eddie Betts; 21 Rory Atkins; 22 Andy Otten; 23 Charlie Cameron	24 Sam Jacobs; 25 Kyle Cheney; 26 Richard Douglas; 27 Tom Lynch; 28 Cam Ellis-Yolmen; 29 Rory Laird; 30 Wayne Milera; 31 Myles Poholke; 32 Troy Menzel; 33 Brodie Smith; 34 Elliott Himmelberg; 35 Matthew Signorello; 36 Dean Gore; 38 Harry Dear; 39 Tom Doedee; 40 Ben Davis; 41 Mitch McGovern; 43 Reilly O'Brien; 44 Matt Crouch	1 Jono Beech; 20 Hugh Greenwood (B); 37 Paul Hunter; 42 Alex Keath (B); 45 Ben Jarman; - Sam Shaw (ret)	**Head coach**: Don Pyke; **Assistant coaches**: Scott Camporeale (midfield); David Teague (forwards); Matthew Clarke (ruck); James Podsiadly (defensive); Heath Younie (development manager); Ryan O'Keefe (SANFL coach and midfield development); Tate Kaesler (team defence specialist coach); Paul Thomas (defensive development); Nathan van Berlo (forwards development); Legend: (c) Captain(s); (vc) Vice-captain(s); Long-term injury list; Upgraded rookie(s); (B) Category B rookie; (ret) Retired

=== Season summary ===
==== Pre-season ====
**Rd**	**Date and local time**	**Opponent**	**Scores** (Adelaide's scores indicated in **bold**)			**Venue**	**Attendance**	**Report**
**Rd**	**Date and local time**	**Opponent**	Home	Away	Result	**Venue**	**Attendance**	**Report**
1	Friday, 24 February (7:40 pm)	Richmond	0.14.8 (92)	**0.10.13 (73)**	Lost by 19 points	Etihad Stadium (A)	7,262	Report
2	Sunday, 5 March (1:350 pm)	Geelong	**1.9.7 (70)**	1.7.13 (64)	Won by 6 points	Richmond Oval (H)	3,800	Report
3	Saturday, 11 March (3:40 pm)	Brisbane Lions	**1.20.13 (142)**	1.15.4 (103)	Won by 39 points	Hickinbotham Oval (H)	4,350	Report

===== Week 1 =====
Round 1
Friday, 24 February 7:40 pm	**Richmond**	def.	Adelaide	Etihad Stadium (crowd: 7,262)	Report
0.1.2 (8); 0.4.6 (30); 0.9.7 (61); 0.14.8 (92)	**Q1; Q2; Q3; Final**	0.3.3 (21); 0.5.5 (35); 0.8.8 (56); 0.10.13 (73)	Umpires: Hosking, Rosebury, Hay, Harris
Nil	**Super Goals**	Nil
Castagna 3, Riewoldt 3, Lloyd, Griffiths, Vlastuin, Butler, Nankervis, McIntosh, Martin, Caddy	**Goals**	Jenkins 4, Hampton 2, Beech, Kelly, Betts, Douglas
Caddy, Prestia, Ellis, Astbury, Castagna, Cotchin, Nankervis	**Best**	Laird, Wigg, Crouch, Smith, Lynch, Cameron, Otten, Jenkins
Nil	**Injuries**	Jacobs (stiff back), Ellis-Yolmen (knee), McGovern (knee), Beech (calf)
Nil	**Reports**	Nil

===== Week 2 =====
Round 2
Sunday, 5 March 1:35 pm	**Adelaide**	def.	Geelong	Richmond Oval (crowd: 3,800)	Report
1.1.0 (15); 1.4.0 (33); 1.9.7 (70); 1.9.7 (70)	**Q1; Q2; Q3; Final**	0.2.3 (15); 1.4.8 (41); 1.4.9 (42); 1.7.13 (64)	Umpires: Haussen, Kamolins, Fleer, Mitchell
Atkins	**Super Goals**	Menzel
Walker 2, Atkins 2, Cameron 2, Smith, T Menzel, Dear	**Goals**	Menzel, Stanley, Parfitt, Tuohy, Cockatoo, Lang, Horlin-Smith
Atkins, M Crouch, Hampton, Hartigan, Laird, Walker	**Best**	Tuohy, Henderson, Horlin-Smith, Lang, Guthrie, Menegola
Gore (head knock)	**Injuries**	McCarthy (shoulder)
Nil	**Reports**	Nil

===== Week 3 =====
Round 3
Saturday, 11 March 3:40 pm	**Adelaide**	def.	Brisbane Lions	Hickinbotham Oval (crowd: 4,350)	Report
0.6.1 (37); 0.13.5 (83); 0.17.10 (112); 1.20.13 (142)	**Q1; Q2; Q3; Final**	0.3.0 (18); 0.9.1 (55); 1.9.2 (65); 1.15.4 (103)	Umpires: Rosebury, Deboy, Hosking
Jenkins	**Super Goals**	Martin
Jenkins 4, McGovern 4, Walker 3, Betts 3, Douglas 2, Menzel, Atkins, Laird, Lynch	**Goals**	Bell 3, Rich 2, Hipwood 2, Hammelmann 2, Lester, Beams, Robinson, Taylor, Cox, Barrett
Laird, Walker, Hampton, McGovern, Otten, Atkins	**Best**	Beams, Martin, Gardiner, Robertson, Bell
Knight (achilles) was replaced in squad by Greenwood	**Injuries**	Nil
Nil	**Reports**	Nil

==== Home and Away season ====
The Crows began the season undefeated for the first five rounds after beating premiership favourites Greater Western Sydney, winning their first match against Hawthorn since 2011, squaring up the Showdown ledger and beating both Essendon and Gold Coast by more than ten goals each. After five rounds, they were one of three undefeated teams, along with Geelong and Richmond, making their Round 6 match against Richmond a blockbuster. Richmond failed to meet expectations and the Crows won by 76 points. Undefeated after six games, the Crows were on top of the ladder with their best start to any season.

Now premiership favourites, the Crows expected an easy win against North Melbourne, who had only won one game and were on the bottom of the ladder. They were then shell-shocked when North Melbourne kept them scoreless for the first quarter and won the game by 59 points. The Crows tried to bounce back the next week against Melbourne, and the led by 28 points halfway through the second quarter, but Melbourne went on to kick the next nine goals and won by 41 points. The Crows then got a chance to play themselves back into form with an 80-point win over Brisbane Lions and a 100-point win over Fremantle. This set up another top-of-the-table clash, this time with Geelong at Geelong's home ground, Simonds Stadium. Geelong led from start to finish and ended up winning by 22 points, Geelong's tenth win in a row against Adelaide at Simonds Stadium. The Crows then went into the bye after beating St Kilda by 57 points on top of the ladder with 9 wins and 3 losses.

After losing to Hawthorn, the Crows did not lose a game for almost two months. First, they won four games against Carlton, the Western Bulldogs, Melbourne and Geelong. After this, they played against Collingwood at the MCG. The Crows went into the game as clear favourites to win, but after a slow start they were trailing by 38 points at half-time. When Collingwood kicked two quick goals to start the third quarter, the lead was extended to 50 points. Adelaide kicked 9 of the next 10 goals to bring the margin back to 3 points early in the final quarter, but they were unable to take the lead. Collingwood kicked three goals in a row to take the margin back out to 21 points, but the Crows came back again and in the dying seconds Collingwood's lead had been diminished to 6 points. Mitch McGovern took a huge pack mark for the Crows seconds before the siren went, and he kicked a goal after the siren to draw the game. This was the Crows' first draw since 1994. Adelaide followed this up with a record-breaking 84-point win in the second Showdown of the season, and a 43-point win over Essendon, guaranteeing them a top two spot and a home Qualifying Final.

In Round 22, they played against Sydney, who after starting winless had won 13 of their last 15 games and were challenging for a spot in the top four. They had another slow start, but fought back to lead in the second half. The Crows were inaccurate in front of goals, so in spite of having seven more scoring shots than the Swans, they lost by three points. In their final game the Crows played West Coast in the final ever AFL game at Domain Stadium, where the Crows lost by 29 points. This was enough for West Coast to make the top eight, beating Melbourne on percentage by half a percent, and because Geelong had beaten the Giants, the Crows finished minor premiers in spite of losing their last two games.

**Rd**	**Date and local time**	**Opponent**	**Scores** (Adelaide's scores indicated in **bold**)			**Venue**	**Attendance**	**Ladder** **position**	**Report**
**Rd**	**Date and local time**	**Opponent**	Home	Away	Result	**Venue**	**Attendance**	**Ladder** **position**	**Report**
1	Sunday, 26 March (2:45 pm)	Greater Western Sydney	**22.15 (147)**	14.7 (91)	Won by 56 points	Adelaide Oval (H)	43,993	1st	Report
2	Saturday, 1 April (1:45 pm)	Hawthorn	13.11 (89)	**16.17 (113)**	Won by 24 points	MCG (A)	37,420	2nd ▼	Report
3	Saturday, 8 April (7:10 pm)	Port Adelaide	12.11 (83)	**15.10 (100)**	Won by 17 points	Adelaide Oval (A)	53,698	1st ▲	Report
4	Saturday, 15 April (7:10 pm)	Essendon	**24.9 (153)**	13.10 (88)	Won by 65 points	Adelaide Oval (H)	47,492	1st	Report
5	Saturday, 22 April (4:35 pm)	Gold Coast	13.8 (86)	**23.15 (153)**	Won by 67 points	Metricon Stadium (A)	12,672	1st	Report
6	Sunday, 30 April (4:10 pm)	Richmond	**21.14 (140)**	10.4 (64)	Won by 76 points	Adelaide Oval (H)	51,069	1st	Report
7	Saturday, 6 May (1:45 pm)	North Melbourne	22.13 (145)	**13.8 (86)**	Lost by 59 points	Blundstone Arena (A)	10,064	1st	Report
8	Saturday, 13 May (7:10 pm)	Melbourne	**9.12 (66)**	17.5 (107)	Lost by 41 points	Adelaide Oval (H)	47,882	1st	Report
9	Saturday, 20 May (7:25 pm)	Brisbane Lions	7.18 (60)	**21.14 (140)**	Won by 80 points	Gabba (A)	13,802	1st	Report
10	Saturday, 27 May (7:10 pm)	Fremantle	**20.23 (143)**	6.7 (43)	Won by 100 points	Adelaide Oval (H)	42,415	1st	Report
11	Friday, 2 June (7:50 pm)	Geelong	13.18 (96)	**10.14 (74)**	Lost by 22 points	Simonds Stadium (A)	30,468	2nd ▼	Report
12	Friday, 9 June (7:20 pm)	St Kilda	**16.15 (111)**	7.12 (54)	Won by 57 points	Adelaide Oval (H)	46,082	1st ▲	Report
13	Bye								
14	Thursday, 22 June (7:20 pm)	Hawthorn	**12.10 (82)**	14.12 (96)	Lost by 14 points	Adelaide Oval (H)	45,312	2nd ▼	Report
15	Saturday, 1 July (2:10 pm)	Carlton	12.5 (77)	**13.11 (89)**	Won by 12 points	MCG (A)	33,433	2nd	Report
16	Friday, 7 July (7:20 pm)	Western Bulldogs	**16.8 (104)**	5.15 (45)	Won by 59 points	Adelaide Oval (H)	41,948	1st ▲	Report
17	Saturday, 15 July (7:10 pm)	Melbourne	10.10 (70)	**17.14 (116)**	Won by 46 points	TIO Stadium (A)	12,104	1st	Report
18	Friday, 21 July (7:20 pm)	Geelong	**13.13 (91)**	10.10 (70)	Won by 21 points	Adelaide Oval (H)	50,464	1st	Report
19	Sunday, 30 July (3:20 pm)	Collingwood	15.13 (103)	**16.7 (103)**	Match drawn	MCG (A)	33,269	1st	Report
20	Sunday, 6 August (4:10 pm)	Port Adelaide	**18.22 (130)**	7.4 (46)	Won by 84 points	Adelaide Oval (H)	45,028	1st	Report
21	Saturday, 12 August (7:25 pm)	Essendon	12.8 (80)	**18.15 (123)**	Won by 43 points	Etihad Stadium (A)	38,487	1st	Report
22	Friday, 18 August (7:20 pm)	Sydney	**11.14 (80)**	13.5 (83)	Lost by 3 points	Adelaide Oval (H)	51,466	1st	Report
23	Sunday, 27 August (2:40 pm)	West Coast	15.10 (100)	**10.11 (71)**	Lost by 29 points	Domain Stadium (A)	39,367	1st	Report

===== Round 1 =====
Round 1
Sunday, 26 March (2:45 pm)	**Adelaide**	def.	Greater Western Sydney	Adelaide Oval (crowd: 43,993)	Report
2.3 (15); 7.9 (51); 15.14 (104); 22.15 (147)	**Q1; Q2; Q3; Final**	4.5 (29); 6.7 (43); 11.7 (73); 14.7 (91)	Umpires: Fisher, Stephens, Jeffery
Betts 4, Atkins 3, Jenkins 3, McGovern 2, Cameron 2, Douglas 2, Knight 2, Mackay, Menzel, Smith, Milera	**Goals**	Cameron 4, Smith 3, Scully 2, Greene, Lobb, Kennedy, Johnson, Patton
Laird, Cameron, Atkins, Douglas, Milera, Betts	**Best**	Kelly, Shiel, Williams, Cameron
Walker (hamstring) replaced in the selected side by Knight	**Injuries**	Mzungu (hamstring)
Nil	**Reports**	Nil
Debut(s) for Adelaide: Troy Menzel (Carlton), Curtly Hampton (Greater Western Sydney); This was Andy Otten's first AFL match in 960 days.

===== Round 2 =====
Round 2
Saturday, 1 April (1:45 pm)	Hawthorn	def. by	**Adelaide**	MCG (crowd: 37,420)	Report
6.2 (38); 8.3 (51); 11.10 (76); 13.11 (89)	**Q1; Q2; Q3; Final**	2.2 (14); 5.8 (38); 11.14 (80); 16.17 (113)	Umpires: Margets, Nicholls, Mitchell
Breust 4, Puopolo 3, Roughead 2, Mitchell, Shiels, Vickery, Rioli	**Goals**	Betts 3, Mackay 3, Walker 2, Lynch, Jacobs, Cameron, Atkins, McGovern, Otten, Sloane, Brown
Mitchell, O'Meara, Puopolo, Gunston, Burgoyne	**Best**	Jacobs, Sloane, Smith, Mackay, Crouch, Betts, Talia
Shiels (left leg), Smith (leg), Birchall (jaw)	**Injuries**	Jenkins (ribs)
Nil	**Reports**	Nil

===== Round 3 =====
Round 3 (Showdown)
Saturday, 8 April (7:10 pm)	Port Adelaide	def. by	**Adelaide**	Adelaide Oval (crowd: 53,698)	Report
4.6 (30); 6.6 (42); 9.8 (62); 12.11 (83)	**Q1; Q2; Q3; Final**	3.3 (21); 7.9 (51); 11.10 (76); 15.10 (100)	Umpires: Dagleigh, Meredith, Williamson; Showdown Medal: Rory Sloane
Wines 2, Wingard 2, R Gray 2, Westhoff, Impey, Dixon, Boak, Eddy, Powell-Pepper	**Goals**	Walker 4, Betts 3, Otten 2, Knight 2, Lynch 2, Mackay, Sloane
Wines, Ryder, Ebert, Byrne-Jones, Hartlett, Boak	**Best**	Sloane, Douglas, Walker, Otten, Laird, Lynch, Knight
Nil	**Injuries**	McGovern (hamstring)
Ryder (striking)	**Reports**	Nil

===== Round 4 =====
Round 4
Saturday, 15 April (7:10 pm)	**Adelaide**	def.	Essendon	Adelaide Oval (crowd: 47,492)	Report
9.2 (56); 15.6 (96); 17.7 (109); 24.9 (153)	**Q1; Q2; Q3; Final**	3.2 (20); 7.2 (44); 10.9 (69); 13.10 (88)	Umpires: Deboy, Schmitt, Kamolins
Betts 6, Walker 5, Otten 2, Atkins 2, Sloane 2, Lynch 2, Cameron, Menzel, Laird, Douglas	**Goals**	McDonald-Tipungwuti 4, Colyer 3, Langford, Daniher, Fantasia, Zaharakis
Walker, Betts, Sloane, Laird, Jacobs, Smith	**Best**	Colyer, Merrett, Goddard, Kelly, Zaharakis, Daniher
Kelly (eye)	**Injuries**	Nil
Nil	**Reports**	McKenna (head high contact)

===== Round 5 =====
Round 5
Saturday, 22 April (4:35 pm)	Gold Coast	def. by	**Adelaide**	Metricon Stadium (crowd: 12,672)	Report
2.2 (14); 4.3 (27); 8.5 (53); 13.8 (86)	**Q1; Q2; Q3; Final**	7.6 (48); 11.9 (75); 17.12 (114); 23.15 (153)	Umpires: Findlay, O'Gorman, Mitchell
Ah Chee 5, Lynch 2, Hall 2, Matera 2, Sexton, Swallow	**Goals**	Betts 3, Lynch 3, Hampton 2, Cameron 2, Knight 2, Walker 2, Menzel 2, Otten 2, Crouch, Sloane, Atkins, Brown, Smith
Ablett, Saad, Ah Chee, Barlow	**Best**	Atkins, Sloane, Crouch, Laird, Lynch, Crouch
Nil	**Injuries**	Talia (hamstring), Knight (hamstring)
Nil	**Reports**	Nil

===== Round 6 =====
Round 6
Sunday, 30 April (4:10 pm)	**Adelaide**	def.	Richmond	Adelaide Oval (crowd: 51,069)	Report
5.0 (30); 11.6 (72); 18.11 (119); 21.14 (140)	**Q1; Q2; Q3; Final**	6.3 (39); 7.3 (45); 8.3 (51); 10.4 (64)	Umpires: Rosebury, Stephens, Hosking
Walker 5, Lynch 3, Sloane 3, Cameron 2, Jenkins, Betts, Douglas, Jacobs, Smith, M Crouch, Otten	**Goals**	Rioli 2, Riewoldt 2, Oleg Markov 2, Butler, Martin, Lambert, Houli
Sloane, M Crouch, Jacobs, Lynch, Walker, Laird	**Best**	Cotchin, Martin, Lambert, Nankervis
Nil	**Injuries**	Nil
Nil	**Reports**	Nil

===== Round 7 =====
Round 7
Saturday, 6 May (1:45 pm)	**North Melbourne**	def.	Adelaide	Blundstone Arena (crowd: 10,064)	Report
10.4 (64); 12.6 (78); 17.12 (114); 22.13 (145)	**Q1; Q2; Q3; Final**	0.0 (0); 5.6 (36); 9.7 (61); 13.8 (86)	Umpires: Chamberlain, Fleer, Mollison
Waite 6, Higgins 2, Dumont 2, Wood 2, Brown 2, Cunnington 2, Ziebell, Clarke, Turner, McDonald, Hrovat, Atley	**Goals**	Betts 3, Cameron 2, Jenkins 2, Douglas 2, Lever, Walker, Jacobs, Atkins
Waite, Cunnington, Wood, Tarrant, Thompson, Goldstein	**Best**	M Crouch, Douglas, Laird, Jacobs
Wagner (ankle)	**Injuries**	Lynch (concussion)
Nil	**Reports**	Nil

===== Round 8 =====
Round 8
Saturday, 13 May (7:10 pm)	Adelaide	def. by	**Melbourne**	Adelaide Oval (crowd: 47,882)	Report
1.4 (10); 6.7 (49); 7.8 (50); 9.12 (66)	**Q1; Q2; Q3; Final**	2.2 (14); 5.3 (33); 12.5 (77); 17.5 (107)	Umpires: Kamolins, Fleer (replaced in second quarter by Hundertmark), Ryan
Walker 2, Betts 2, Jenkins 2, Laird, Atkins, Smith	**Goals**	Pedersen 3, McDonald 2, Bugg 2, Jones 2, Garlett 2, Kent 2, Viney, Oliver, Petracca, Hannan
Laird, Jacobs, Atkins	**Best**	Viney, McDonald, Salem, Oliver, Vince, Petracca, Jones, Hibberd
Nil	**Injuries**	Hunt (concussion)
Nil	**Reports**	Nil

===== Round 9 =====
Round 9
Sunday, 20 May (7:25 pm)	Brisbane Lions	def. by	**Adelaide**	The Gabba (crowd: 13,802)	Report
3.6 (24); 4.11 (35); 5.12 (42); 7.18 (60)	**Q1; Q2; Q3; Final**	3.3 (21); 10.5 (65); 17.9 (111); 21.14 (140)	Umpires: Deboy, Kamolins, Harris
Barrett 2, Zorko 2, Hammelmann, Walker, McCluggage	**Goals**	Cameron 4, Betts 3, Walker 3, Lynch 3, Greenwood 3, Otten 2, Milera, B Crouch, Gallucci
D Beams, Rich, Taylor, Zorko	**Best**	Lynch, Laird, Sloane, Cameron, Crouch, Walker
C Beams (hamstring)	**Injuries**	Hampton (ankle)
Nil	**Reports**	Nil

===== Round 10 =====
Round 10
Saturday, 27 May (7:10 pm)	**Adelaide**	def.	Fremantle	Adelaide Oval (crowd: 42,415)	Report
5.9 (39); 9.18 (72); 16.21 (117); 20.23 (143)	**Q1; Q2; Q3; Final**	1.0 (6); 2.1 (13); 4.2 (26); 6.7 (43)	Umpires: Foot, Hosking, McInerney
Otten 4, Jenkins 3, Milera 3, Betts 3, Cameron 3, Sloane 2, Walker, Jacobs	**Goals**	Tucker 2, Weller 2, McCarthy, Fyfe
M Crouch, Sloane, Otten, Atkins, B Crouch, Lever	**Best**	Weller, Blakely, Hamling, Spurr
Nil	**Injuries**	Nil
Nil	**Reports**	Nil

===== Round 11 =====
Round 11
Friday, 2 June (7:50 pm)	**Geelong**	def.	Adelaide	Simonds Stadium (crowd: 30,468)	Report
3.6 (24); 9.10 (64); 12.13 (85); 13.18 (96)	**Q1; Q2; Q3; Final**	2.3 (15); 5.5 (35); 7.9 (51); 10.14 (74)	Umpires: Kamolins, Meredith, Harris, Ryan
Dangerfield 3, Menzel 3, Hawkins 2, Taylor 2, J Selwood, Motlop, Parsons	**Goals**	Walker 3, Lynch 2, Jenkins 2, Cameron, Betts, Otten
J Selwood, Dangerfield, Selwood, Henderson, Smith, Stewart, Tuohy	**Best**	Lever, M Crouch, Lynch, Crouch, Greenwood
J Selwood (cut head)	**Injuries**	Lever (ankle)
Nil	**Reports**	Nil

===== Round 12 =====
Round 12
Friday, 9 June (7:20 pm)	**Adelaide**	def.	St Kilda	Adelaide Oval (crowd: 46,082)	Report
5.6 (36); 8.9 (57); 11.11 (77); 16.15 (111)	**Q1; Q2; Q3; Final**	1.1 (7); 2.4 (16); 3.10 (28); 7.12 (54)	Umpires: Rosebury, Hosking, Schmitt, Mollison
Lynch, Jenkins, Walker 3, Betts 2, Sloane, Otten, Milera, Smith, Beech	**Goals**	Bruce 4, Stevens, Billings, McCartin
Lynch, Jacobs, Atkins, Douglas, Laird, Lever, Smith	**Best**	Ross, Stevens, Newnes, Geary, Bruce
Nil	**Injuries**	Weller (ankle), Carlisle (hamstring), Brown (hamstring)
Nil	**Reports**	Nil

===== Round 14 =====
Round 14
Thursday, 22 June (7:20 pm)	Adelaide	def. by	**Hawthorn**	Adelaide Oval (crowd: 45,312)	Report
4.2 (26); 9.4 (58); 10.6 (66); 12.10 (82)	**Q1; Q2; Q3; Final**	4.2 (26); 6.4 (40); 9.7 (61); 14.12 (96)	Umpires: Fisher, Margetts, Meredith
Jenkins 3, Walker 2, Greenwood 2, Cameron, B Crouch, Betts, Lynch, Otten	**Goals**	O'Brien 2, Burton 2, Puopolo 2, Henderson 2, Burgoyne 2, Roughead, Langford, Hartung, Mitchell
M Crouch, Greenwood, Laird, Talia, Lynch	**Best**	Henderson, Mitchell, Burgoyne, Birchall, Burton, Hardwick
Milera (knee), Brown (ankle)	**Injuries**	Nil
Nil	**Reports**	Nil

===== Round 15 =====
Round 15
Saturday, 1 July (2:10 pm)	Carlton	def. by	**Adelaide**	MCG (crowd: 33,433)	Report
1.0 (6); 5.1 (31); 8.2 (50); 12.5 (77)	**Q1; Q2; Q3; Final**	4.0 (24); 6.1 (37); 9.7 (61); 13.11 (89)	Umpires: Dalgleish, Harris, Pannell
Gibbs 2, Casboult 2, Cuningham, Cripps, Silvagni, Kerridge, Sumner, Curnow, Wright, Thomas	**Goals**	Jenkins 3, Betts 2, Knight 2, Smith, McGovern, Sloane, Walker, Jacobs, M Crouch
Gibbs, Cripps, Jones, Kreuzer, Kerridge, Curnow	**Best**	M Crouch, Smith, B Crouch, Jenkins, Douglas, Lever
Marchbank (right shoulder), Plowman (dislocated finger), Weitering (ankle)	**Injuries**	Hartigan (hamstring)
Nil	**Reports**	Nil

===== Round 16 =====
Round 16
Friday, 7 July (7:20 pm)	**Adelaide**	def.	Western Bulldogs	Adelaide Oval (crowd: 41,948)	Report
2.2 (14); 5.5 (35); 12.5 (77); 16.8 (104)	**Q1; Q2; Q3; Final**	2.4 (16); 4.8 (32); 4.11 (35); 5.15 (45)	Umpires: Chamberlain, Fleer, Meredith
Jenkins 4, Walker 3, Betts 2, Knight, Sloane, Atkins, M Crouch, B Crouch, Douglas, Cameron	**Goals**	Stringer, Redpath, Suckling, Dale, Dahlhaus
Walker, Jenkins, Sloane, Lever, Otten, Laird, M Crouch	**Best**	McLean, Bontempelli, Hunter
Nil	**Injuries**	Nil
Nil	**Reports**	Nil

===== Round 17 =====
Round 17
Saturday, 15 July (7:10 pm)	Melbourne	def. by	**Adelaide**	TIO Stadium (crowd: 12,104)	Report
1.3 (9); 5.3 (33); 9.7 (61); 10.10 (70)	**Q1; Q2; Q3; Final**	7.2 (44); 11.6 (72); 12.11 (83); 17.14 (116)	Umpires: Donlon, Rosebury, Ryan
Melksham 3, Kent, Petracca, Neal-Bullen, Oliver, Gawn, Hunt, T McDonald	**Goals**	Walker 4, Lynch 3, Mackay 2, McGovern 2, Betts 2, Knight, B Crouch, Jacobs, Jenkins
Hibberd, Vince, Lewis, Kennedy Harris, Hunt, Neal-Bullen	**Best**	B Crouch, Walker, Lynch, Laird, M Crouch, Cameron
Kent (left shoulder)	**Injuries**	Sloane (concussion), Lever (hamstring)
Vince (rough conduct)	**Reports**	Walker (striking)

===== Round 18 =====
Round 18
Friday, 21 July (7:20 pm)	**Adelaide**	def.	Geelong	Adelaide Oval (crowd: 50,464)	Report
5.2 (32); 9.5 (59); 13.9 (87); 13.13 (91)	**Q1; Q2; Q3; Final**	1.4 (10); 4.6 (30); 7.8 (50); 10.10 (70)	Umpires: Hosking, Chamberlain, Ryan
Douglas 4, Sloane 3, Greenwood, Cameron, Jenkins, Lynch, Brown, Walker	**Goals**	Taylor 5, Duncan, Hawkins, Blicavs, Dangerfield, Menzel
Sloane, Douglas, Jenkins, Talia, B Crouch, M Crouch, Greenwood, Kelly	**Best**	Taylor, Dangerfield, Henderson, Selwood, Duncan, Bews
B Crouch (fractured cheekbone)	**Injuries**	Stanley (corked calf), Blicavs (ankle)
Nil	**Reports**	Nil

===== Round 19 =====
Round 19
Sunday, 30 July (3:20 pm)	Collingwood	drew with	Adelaide	MCG (crowd: 33,269)	Report
4.3 (27); 9.6 (60); 12.9 (81); 15.13 (103)	**Q1; Q2; Q3; Final**	2.1 (13); 3.4 (22); 10.4 (64); 16.7 (103)	Umpires: Margetts, Meredith, Ryan
Adams 3, Wells 3, Reid 2, Blair 2, Hoskin-Elliott, Thomas, Elliott, Moore, Treloar	**Goals**	McGovern 4, Jenkins 3, Otten 2, Lynch, Seedsman, Walker, Cameron, Mackay, Knight, Smith
Wells, Sidebottom, Adams, Howe, Moore	**Best**	M Crouch, Walker, Smith, McGovern, Douglas, Jenkins, Mackay
Blair (nose)	**Injuries**	Keath (wrist)
Nil	**Reports**	Nil

===== Round 20 =====
Round 20 (Showdown)
Sunday, 6 August (4:10 pm)	**Adelaide**	def.	Port Adelaide	Adelaide Oval (crowd: 45,028)	Report
1.9 (15); 5.15 (45); 12.18 (90); 18.22 (130)	**Q1; Q2; Q3; Final**	1.1 (7); 1.3 (9); 4.4 (28); 7.4 (46)	Umpires: Stevic, Stevens, Dalgleish; Showdown Medal: Sam Jacobs
Jenkins 4, Betts 4, Walker 3, Jacobs 2, Laird, Greenwood, B Crouch, Lynch, Sloane	**Goals**	Dixon 2, Westhoff, Polec, Gray, Ebert, Hombsch
Jacobs, Walker, Sloane, B Crouch, Lynch, Laird, Betts, M Crouch	**Best**	Gray, Boak, Dixon
Mackay (corked thigh), Talia (groin)	**Injuries**	Nil
Nil	**Reports**	Nil

===== Round 21 =====
Round 21
Saturday, 12 August (7:25 pm)	Essendon	def. by	**Adelaide**	Etihad Stadium (crowd: 38,487)	Report
2.2 (14); 5.4 (34); 9.7 (61); 12.8 (80)	**Q1; Q2; Q3; Final**	5.3 (33); 10.6 (66); 14.9 (93); 18.15 (123)	Umpires: Dalgleish, Williamson, Pannell
Hooker 4, Daniher 3, Stewart 2, McKenna, Watson, Colyer	**Goals**	Jenkins 3, McGovern 3, Douglas 2, Walker 2, Smith 2, Greenwood, Lynch, Knight, Atkins, Mackay, B Crouch
Hurley, McGrath, Hooker, Daniher, Zaharakis, Leuenberger	**Best**	M Crouch, Douglas, Smith, Jenkins, Atkins, Sloane
Daniher (finger)	**Injuries**	Walker (ankle), Sloane (left leg)
Nil	**Reports**	Nil

===== Round 22 =====
Round 22
Friday, 18 August (7:20 pm)	Adelaide	def. by	**Sydney**	Adelaide Oval (crowd: 51,466)	Report
2.2 (14); 5.5 (35); 8.10 (58); 11.14 (80)	**Q1; Q2; Q3; Final**	5.1 (31); 7.1 (43); 11.3 (69); 13.5 (83)	Umpires: Deboy, Donlon, Pannell
McGovern 4, Betts 2, Sloane, M Crouch, Lynch, Walker, Jenkins	**Goals**	Franklin 3, Rohan 2, Reid 2, Tippett, Kennedy, Jack, Jones, McVeigh, Papley
Sloane, M Crouch, Laird, Lynch, McGovern, Jacobs	**Best**	Franklin, Kennedy, Rampe, Hannebery, McVeigh, Smith
Talia (ankle)	**Injuries**	Nil
Nil	**Reports**	Jones (rough conduct)

===== Round 23 =====
Round 23
Sunday, 27 August (2:40 pm)	**West Coast**	def.	Adelaide	Domain Stadium (crowd: 39,367)	Report
4.1 (25); 8.4 (52); 13.5 (83); 15.10 (100)	**Q1; Q2; Q3; Final**	1.1 (7); 5.5 (35); 7.10 (52); 10.11 (71)	Umpires: D.Margetts, N.Williamson, S.Ryan
Cripps 3, Hutchings 2, LeCras 2, Vardy, Redden, Gaff, Shuey, Kennedy, Petrie, Jetta, Darling	**Goals**	Betts 2, McGovern 2, Milera, Smith, Jenkins, M Crouch, Seedsman, Cameron
Mitchell, Gaff, Hurn, Shuey, Priddis, Cripps	**Best**	M Crouch, B Crouch, Sloane, Laird, Jacobs, Hartigan
Nil	**Injuries**	Nil
Nil	**Reports**	Nil

==== Finals ====
When Rory Sloane had surgery to have his appendix removed before the finals, the Crows were forced to play without him in the first week. Without Sloane, the Crows still thrived in wet conditions, keeping Greater Western Sydney to just 11 points, the lowest half-time score in a final since the 1960 VFL Grand Final. The Crows went on to win by 36 points after leading at half time by 44 points, setting up a home preliminary final. This came at the cost of defender Brodie Smith, who tore his ACL in the first quarter, ending his season and putting into question whether he'd play in 2018.

Due to the bye week before the finals, there was concern that the Crows would have trouble after only playing two games in the month leading up to the preliminary final. After having the week off and Geelong beating Sydney in the Second Semi-Final, it was announced that Adelaide would be playing Geelong on Friday night at Adelaide Oval. To prepare during the week off, the Crows played a match simulation. At this simulation, key forward Mitch McGovern injured his hamstring.

At the preliminary final, Sloane returned from his appendicitis and Andy Otten was brought into the team to replace McGovern. The Crows had another fast start, scoring six goals to one in the first quarter and leading by 48 points early in the second quarter on their way to a 61-point win. This win put them through to their first grand final since their 1998 premiership.

Adelaide played in the 2017 AFL Grand Final against Richmond. They led at quarter time by 11 points, but Richmond went on to kick the next seven goals and win the match by 48 points, their first premiership since 1980.

**Rd**	**Date and local time**	**Opponent**	**Scores** (Adelaide's scores indicated in **bold**)			**Venue**	**Attendance**	**Report**
**Rd**	**Date and local time**	**Opponent**	Home	Away	Result	**Venue**	**Attendance**	**Report**
QF1	Thursday, 7 September (7:20 pm)	Greater Western Sydney	**12.12 (84)**	6.12 (48)	Won by 36 points	Adelaide Oval (H)	52,805	Report
PF1	Friday, 22 September (7:20 pm)	Geelong	**21.10 (136)**	10.15 (75)	Won by 61 points	Adelaide Oval (H)	53,817	Report
GF	Saturday, 30 September (2:30 pm)	Richmond	**8.12 (60)**	16.12 (108)	Lost by 48 points	Melbourne Cricket Ground	100,021	Report

===== First Qualifying Final =====
First Qualifying Final
Thursday, 7 September(7:20 pm)	**Adelaide**	def.	Greater Western Sydney	Adelaide Oval (crowd: 52,805)	Report
3.4 (22); 8.7 (55); 12.8 (80); 12.12 (84)	**Q1; Q2; Q3; Final**	1.4 (10); 1.5 (11); 5.7 (37); 6.12 (48)	Umpires: Dalgleish, Rosebury, Ryan
Betts 3, Douglas 2, Smith, Seedsman, McGovern, Walker, Jenkins, Lynch, B. Crouch	**Goals**	Coniglio 2, Himmelberg, Ward, Greene, de Boer
Betts, M. Crouch, Lynch, B. Crouch, Jacobs, Brown, Greenwood	**Best**	Kelly, Coniglio, Scully, de Boer, Ward
Smith (knee)	**Injuries**	Cameron (hamstring)
Nil	**Reports**	Nil

===== First Preliminary Final =====
First Preliminary Final
Friday, 22 September (7:20 pm)	**Adelaide**	def.	Geelong	Adelaide Oval (crowd: 53,817)	Report
6.3 (39); 11.7 (73); 14.10 (94); 21.10 (136)	**Q1; Q2; Q3; Final**	1.2 (8); 5.8 (38); 8.11 (59); 10.15 (75)	Umpires: Rosebury, Stevic, Schmitt
Cameron 5, Jenkins 4, Walker 2, Betts 2, Lynch 2, Seedsman 2, Jacobs, Otten, Crouch, Knight	**Goals**	Dangerfield 2, Cockatoo, Duncan, J Selwood, Lang, Hawkins, Motlop, Henderson, Menegola
Laird, Cameron, Crouch, Seedsman, Crouch, Talia	**Best**	J Selwood, Motlop, Taylor, Mackie, Dangerfield
Nil	**Injuries**	S Selwood (hamstring), Lonergan (corked quad), J Selwood (groin)
Nil	**Reports**	Nil

===== Grand Final =====
2017 AFL Grand Final
30 September (2:30 pm)	Adelaide	def. by	**Richmond**	Melbourne Cricket Ground (crowd: 100,021)	Report
4.2 (26); 4.7 (31); 5.10 (40); 8.12 (60)	**Q1; Q2; Q3; Final**	2.3 (15); 6.4 (40); 11.8 (74); 16.12 (108)	Umpires: Stevic, Meredith, Ryan; Norm Smith Medal: Dustin Martin; National anthem: Dami Im
Sloane 2, Walker 2, Betts, Greenwood, B Crouch, Cameron	**Goals**	Graham 3, Townsend 2, Martin 2, Riewoldt 2, Caddy, Houli, Grigg, Lambert, Castagna, Prestia, Butler
M Crouch, Jacobs, B Crouch, Sloane, Laird	**Best**	Martin, Rance, Houli, Astbury, Prestia, Edwards, Graham, Grimes
Nil	**Injuries**	Rioli (ankle)
Nil	**Reports**	Nil

=== Ladder ===
Pos	Team	Pld	W	L	D	PF	PA	PP	Pts	Qualification
**1**	Adelaide	**22**	**15**	**6**	**1**	**2415**	**1776**	**136.0**	62	2017 finals
2	Geelong	22	15	6	1	2134	1818	117.4	62	2017 finals
3	Richmond (P)	22	15	7	0	1992	1684	118.3	60	2017 finals
4	Greater Western Sydney	22	14	6	2	2081	1812	114.8	60	2017 finals
5	Port Adelaide	22	14	8	0	2168	1671	129.7	56	2017 finals
6	Sydney	22	14	8	0	2093	1651	126.8	56	2017 finals
7	Essendon	22	12	10	0	2135	2004	106.5	48	2017 finals
8	West Coast	22	12	10	0	1964	1858	105.7	48	2017 finals
9	Melbourne	22	12	10	0	2035	1934	105.2	48	
10	Western Bulldogs	22	11	11	0	1857	1913	97.1	44	
11	St Kilda	22	11	11	0	1925	1986	96.9	44	
12	Hawthorn	22	10	11	1	1864	2055	90.7	42	
13	Collingwood	22	9	12	1	1944	1963	99.0	38	
14	Fremantle	22	8	14	0	1607	2160	74.4	32	
15	North Melbourne	22	6	16	0	1983	2264	87.6	24	
16	Carlton	22	6	16	0	1594	2038	78.2	24	
17	Gold Coast	22	6	16	0	1756	2311	76.0	24	
18	Brisbane Lions	22	5	17	0	1877	2526	74.3	20	

Source: AFL
Rules for classification: 1) points; 2) percentage; 3) number of points for.
(P) Premiers

== AFL Women's ==
After finishing second in the ladder, Adelaide won the first AFLW grand final by defeating Brisbane Lions 4.11 (31) to 4.5 (25).

The Crows started the first-ever AFL Women's season strongly, winning their first four matches, and spending three of the first four rounds at the top of the ladder. Adelaide then faced a crucial home match against Brisbane, the other undefeated team, and narrowly lost at home in front of over 10,000. A win in the next game, played in Darwin, would seal a finals appearance for the Crows, but after being down 14 points late in the fourth quarter two late goals were not enough to overcome Melbourne. Needing a win in their final against Collingwood to make the grand final, the Crows came back to win. After being down at three-quarter time by 7 points, the Crows scored 32 points in the final quarter while holding the Magpies to only a behind.

Adelaide started the grand final strongly with a goal only 20 seconds into the match by Kellie Gibson. In front the whole match after that kick, the Crows weathered a late comeback to win the first-ever AFLW final by six points.

=== 2017 Squad ===
Adelaide Football Club (AFL Women's)
Senior list		Rookie list	Coaching staff
1 Abbey Holmes; 2 Kellie Gibson; 3 Ange Foley (vc); 4 Georgia Bevan; 5 Jenna McCormick; 6 Talia Radan; 7 Rachael Killian; 8 Sally Riley (vc); 9 Deni Varnhagen; 10 Ebony Marinoff; 11 Rhiannon Metcalfe; 14 Stevie-Lee Thompson; 15 Tayla Thorn	16 Sophie Armitstead; 17 Jess Sedunary; 18 Monique Hollick; 19 Heather Anderson; 21 Lauren O'Shea; 22 Courtney Cramey; 23 Justine Mules; 26 Chelsea Randall (c); 28 Sarah Perkins; 31 Dayna Cox; 33 Anne Hatchard; 39 Sarah Allan	12 Jasmine Anderson; 13 Erin Phillips (c)	Head coach: Bec Goddard; Assistant coach: Andrew Hodges; Legend: (c) Captain(s); (vc) Vice-captain(s); Long-term injury; Updated: 14 February 2017; Source(s): Players, Coaches

=== Regular season ===
Adelaide's 2017 AFL Women's season fixture
Round	Date and local time	Opponent	Home	Away	Result	Venue	Attendance	Ladder position	Ref
Round	Date and local time	Opponent	Scores^{[a]}			Venue	Attendance	Ladder position	Ref
1	Saturday, 4 February (4:35 pm)	Greater Western Sydney	7.6 (48)	1.6 (12)	Won by 36 points	Thebarton Oval [H]	—N/a	2nd	
2	Friday, 10 February (7:35 pm)	Western Bulldogs	2.11 (23)	7.6 (48)	Won by 25 points	VU Whitten Oval [A]	—N/a	1st ▲	
3	Sunday, 19 February (11:35 am)	Carlton	2.5 (17)	2.5 (14)	Won by 3 points	Thebarton Oval [H]	9,006	1st	
4	Sunday, 26 February (4:05 pm)	Fremantle	3.5 (23)	6.10 (46)	Won by 23 points	Fremantle Oval [A]	—N/a	1st	
5	Saturday, 4 March (10:35 am)	Brisbane	4.6 (30)	5.3 (33)	Lost by 3 points	Norwood Oval [H]	10,676	2nd ▼	
6	Saturday, 11 March (5:40 am)	Melbourne	5.2 (32)	5.4 (34)	Lost by 2 points	TIO Stadium [H]	—N/a	2nd	
7	Sunday, 19 March (1:35 pm)	Collingwood	7.4 (46)	10.10 (70)	Won by 24 points	Olympic Park Oval [H]	2,500	2nd	

=== Ladder ===
Pos	Team	Pld	W	L	D	PF	PA	PP	Pts	Qualification
1	Brisbane	7	6	0	1	224	148	151.4	26	Grand Final
2	Adelaide (P)	7	5	2	0	291	185	157.3	20	Grand Final
3	Melbourne	7	5	2	0	258	183	141.0	20	
4	Carlton	7	3	3	1	261	232	112.5	14	
5	Collingwood	7	3	4	0	224	262	85.5	12	
6	Western Bulldogs	7	2	5	0	237	232	102.2	8	
7	Fremantle	7	1	5	1	191	298	64.1	6	
8	Greater Western Sydney	7	1	5	1	157	303	51.8	6	

Source: AFL.com.au
Rules for classification: 1) points; 2) percentage; 3) number of points for.
(P) Premiers

=== 2017 Grand Final ===
2017 AFL Women's Grand Final
Saturday, 25 March (1:00pm)	Brisbane	v	Adelaide	Metricon Stadium (crowd: 15,610)
1.0 (6); 2.1 (13); 3.3 (21); 4.5 (29)	Q1; Q2; Q3; Final	2.1 (13); 2.7 (19); 4.9 (33); 4.11 (35)	Umpires: Rodger, Bryce, Cheeve; Best on Ground: Erin Phillips; Television broadcast: 7mate & Fox Footy; National anthem: Megan Washington
Wuetschner 2, Frederick-Traub, Harris	Goals	Phillips 2, Gibson, McCarthy
Bates, Hunt, Frederick-Traub, Wuetschner, Virgo	Best	Phillips, Randall, Cramey, Bevan, Marinoff
Injuries	Anderson

== SANFL ==
This is the 4th season in the South Australian National Football League contested by the Adelaide Football Club.

=== Ladder ===
Pos	Team	Pld	W	L	D	PF	PA	PP	Pts
1	Woodville-West Torrens	18	14	4	0	1379	1132	54.92	28
2	Port Adelaide	18	13	5	0	1834	1226	59.93	26
3	Sturt (P)	18	12	5	1	1535	1263	54.86	25
4	Norwood	18	10	7	1	1539	1482	50.94	21
5	Central District	18	8	10	0	1477	1433	50.76	16
6	South Adelaide	18	8	10	0	1314	1404	48.34	16
7	Glenelg	18	8	10	0	1372	1535	47.20	16
8	Adelaide	18	7	11	0	1359	1527	47.09	14
9	West Adelaide	18	5	13	0	1210	1666	42.07	10
10	North Adelaide	18	4	14	0	1280	1631	43.97	8

Source: australianfootball.com
Rules for classification: 1) points; 2) percentage; 3) number of points for.
(P) Premiers
