= 2015 Adelaide Football Club season =

Adelaide Football Club
2015 season
- Coach: Phil Walsh (round 1–13); Scott Camporeale (round 15–Semi Final)
- Captain: Taylor Walker
- Home ground: Adelaide Oval (Capacity: 53,583)
- AFL season: 7th
- Finals series: 6th
- Malcolm Blight Medal: Patrick Dangerfield
- Leading goalkicker: Eddie Betts (64 goals)
- Highest home attendance: 53,445 (Round 22 v West Coast)
- Lowest home attendance: 42,656 (Round 17 v Gold Coast)
- Average home attendance: 47,273
- Club membership: 60,328

The Adelaide Football Club's 2015 season was its 25th season in the Australian Football League (AFL). The club also fielded a reserves team in the South Australian National Football League (SANFL). Adelaide's 2015 season was tragically interrupted midway through by the murder of coach Phil Walsh in July.

== Squad ==
Adelaide Football Club
Senior list		Rookie List	Coaching staff
1 James Podsiadly; 2 Brad Crouch; 3 Brent Reilly; 4 Josh Jenkins; 5 Scott Thompson; 6 Jake Lever; 7 Nathan van Berlo; 8 Mitch Grigg; 9 Rory Sloane; 10 Matthew Jaensch; 11 Matthew Wright; 12 Daniel Talia; 13 Taylor Walker (c); 14 David Mackay; 15 Kyle Hartigan; 16 Luke Brown; 17 Sam Kerridge; 18 Eddie Betts; 20 Sam Siggins; 21 Rory Atkins	22 Andy Otten; 23 Charlie Cameron; 24 Sam Jacobs; 25 Kyle Cheney; 26 Richard Douglas; 27 Tom Lynch; 28 Cam Ellis-Yolmen; 29 Rory Laird; 31 Jarryd Lyons; 32 Patrick Dangerfield; 33 Brodie Smith; 34 Sam Shaw; 35 Harrison Wigg; 36 Brodie Martin; 38 Harry Dear; 39 Riley Knight; 40 Luke Lowden; 41 Mitch McGovern; 44 Matt Crouch; 45 Ricky Henderson	30 Jack Osborn (B); 42 Reilly O'Brien; 43 Keenan Ramsay; 46 Anthony Wilson; 47 Jake Kelly	Head coach: Scott Camporeale (interim); Assistant coaches: David Teague (forwards); Matthew Clarke (ruck/stoppages); Scott Camporeale (midfield); Ryan O'Keefe (midfield development); Darren Milburn (defence); Darren Glass (leadership program); John Worsfold (director of coaching); Legend: (c) Captain(s); (vc) Vice-captain(s); Long-term injury list; Upgraded rookie(s); (vet) Veteran list; (B) Category B rookie; Updated: End of season Source(s):

== AFL season ==
**Rd**	**Date and local time**	**Opponent**	**Scores** (Adelaide's scores indicated in **bold**)			**Venue**	**Attendance**
**Rd**	**Date and local time**	**Opponent**	Home	Away	Result	**Venue**	**Attendance**
1	Sunday, 5 April (2:50pm)	North Melbourne	**21.14 (140)**	9.9 (63)	Won by 77 points	Adelaide Oval (H)	46,491
2	Saturday, 11 April (4:35pm)	Collingwood	9.9 (63)	**12.18 (90)**	Won by 27 points	Etihad Stadium (A)	33,771
3	Saturday, 18 April (1:40pm)	Melbourne	**12.8 (80)**	7.13 (55)	Won by 25 points	Adelaide Oval (H)	43,713
4	Sunday, 26 April (4:40pm)	Western Bulldogs	18.17 (125)	**10.8 (68)**	Lost by 57 points	Etihad Stadium (A)	19,915
5	Sunday, 3 May (4:10pm)	Port Adelaide	**13.13 (91)**	18.7 (115)	Lost by 24 points	Adelaide Oval (H)	49,735
6	Saturday, 9 May (5:10pm)	Gold Coast	11.12 (78)	**18.11 (119)**	Won by 41 points	Metricon Stadium (A)	12,464
7	Saturday, 16 May (1:15pm)	St Kilda	**18.11 (119)**	10.13 (73)	Won by 46 points	Adelaide Oval (H)	43,532
8	Saturday, 23 May (2:10pm)	Greater Western Sydney	16.12 (108)	**12.12 (84)**	Lost by 24 points	Spotless Stadium (A)	9,481
9	Saturday, 30 May (7:10pm)	Fremantle	**7.15 (57)**	10.8 (68)	Lost by 11 points	Adelaide Oval (H)	45,518
10	Saturday, 6 June (1:40pm)	Carlton	14.6 (90)	**14.15 (99)**	Won by 9 points	Melbourne Cricket Ground (A)	32,035
11	Bye						
12	Thursday, 18 June (7:20pm)	Hawthorn	**12.13 (85)**	17.12 (114)	Lost by 29 points	Adelaide Oval (H)	50,023
13	Saturday, 27 June (4:35pm)	Brisbane Lions	10.9 (69)	**11.16 (82)**	Won by 13 points	The Gabba (A)	18,146
14	Match against Geelong cancelled due to the death of senior coach Phil Walsh						
15	Saturday, 11 July (5:40pm)	West Coast	22.15 (147)	**14.7 (91)**	Lost by 56 points	Domain Stadium (A)	38,133
16	Sunday, 19 July (2:50pm)	Port Adelaide	17.11 (113)	**18.8 (116)**	Won by 3 points	Adelaide Oval (A)	54,468
17	Saturday, 25 July (1:40pm)	Gold Coast	**19.11 (125)**	12.8 (80)	Won by 45 points	Adelaide Oval (H)	42,656
18	Saturday, 1 August (4:35pm)	Sydney	17.15 (117)	**9.11 (65)**	Lost by 52 points	Sydney Cricket Ground (A)	38,690
19	Friday, 7 August (7:20pm)	Richmond	**11.22 (88)**	8.4 (52)	Won by 36 points	Adelaide Oval (H)	50,094
20	Saturday, 15 August (1:45pm)	Essendon	8.11 (59)	**27.9 (171)**	Won by 112 points	Etihad Stadium (A)	25,914
21	Saturday, 22 August (7:10pm)	Brisbane Lions	**20.11 (131)**	6.8 (44)	Won by 87 points	Adelaide Oval (H)	47,527
22	Saturday, 30 August (12:40pm)	West Coast	**19.12 (126)**	10.9 (69)	Won by 57 points	Adelaide Oval (H)	53,445
23	Saturday, 5 September (1:05pm)	Geelong	17.17 (119)	**11.14 (80)**	Lost by 39 points	Simonds Stadium (A)	26,128

== Ladder ==
2015 AFL ladder
Pos	Team	Pld	W	L	D	PF	PA	PP	Pts	
1	Fremantle	22	17	5	0	1857	1564	118.7	68	Finals series
2	West Coast	22	16	5	1	2330	1572	148.2	66	Finals series
3	Hawthorn (P)	22	16	6	0	2452	1548	158.4	64	Finals series
4	Sydney	22	16	6	0	2006	1578	127.1	64	Finals series
5	Richmond	22	15	7	0	1930	1568	123.1	60	Finals series
6	Western Bulldogs	22	14	8	0	2101	1825	115.1	56	Finals series
7	Adelaide	21	13	8	0	2107	1821	115.7	54 (Note: The round 14 match between Adelaide and Geelong was cancelled due to the death of Adelaide coach Phil Walsh, and both teams were awarded two premiership points each.)	Finals series
8	North Melbourne	22	13	9	0	2062	1937	106.5	52	Finals series
9	Port Adelaide	22	12	10	0	2002	1874	106.8	48	
10	Geelong	21	11	9	1	1853	1833	101.1	48	
11	Greater Western Sydney	22	11	11	0	1872	1891	99.0	44	
12	Collingwood	22	10	12	0	1972	1856	106.3	40	
13	Melbourne	22	7	15	0	1573	2044	77.0	28	
14	St Kilda	22	6	15	1	1695	2162	78.4	26	
15	Essendon	22	6	16	0	1580	2134	74.0	24	
16	Gold Coast	22	4	17	1	1633	2240	72.9	18	
17	Brisbane Lions	22	4	18	0	1557	2306	67.5	16	
18	Carlton	22	4	18	0	1525	2354	64.8	16	

Rules for classification: 1) points; 2) percentage; 3) number of points for.
(P) Premiers

== AFL finals series ==
**Rd**	**Date and local time**	**Opponent**	**Scores** (Adelaide's scores indicated in **bold**)			**Venue**	**Attendance**
**Rd**	**Date and local time**	**Opponent**	Home	Away	Result	**Venue**	**Attendance**
EF2	Saturday 12 September (7:50pm)	Western Bulldogs	14.18 (102)	**16.13 (109)**	Won by 7 points	Melbourne Cricket Ground (A)	60.782
SF2	Friday 19 September (7:50pm)	Hawthorn	21.9 (135)	**8.13 (61)**	Lost by 74 points	Melbourne Cricket Ground (A)	70,879

== Match Review Panel ==
Player	Round	Charge category	Verdict	Result	Victim	Club	Ref(s)
Rory Sloane	3	Instigating a melee	Guilty	$1,500 fine		Melbourne	
Scott Thompson	3	Engaging in a melee	Guilty	$1,500 fine		Melbourne	
Josh Jenkins	3	Engaging in a melee	Guilty	$1,000 fine		Melbourne	
Matthew Jaensch	3	Engaging in a melee	Guilty	$1,000 fine		Melbourne	
Taylor Walker	3	Engaging in a melee	Guilty	$1,000 fine		Melbourne	
Taylor Walker	10	Striking	N/A	Cleared	Cameron Wood	Carlton	
Richard Douglas	17	Rough conduct	Guilty	$1,000 fine	Matt Shaw	Gold Coast	
