= Matt Crouch (footballer) =

Australian rules footballer

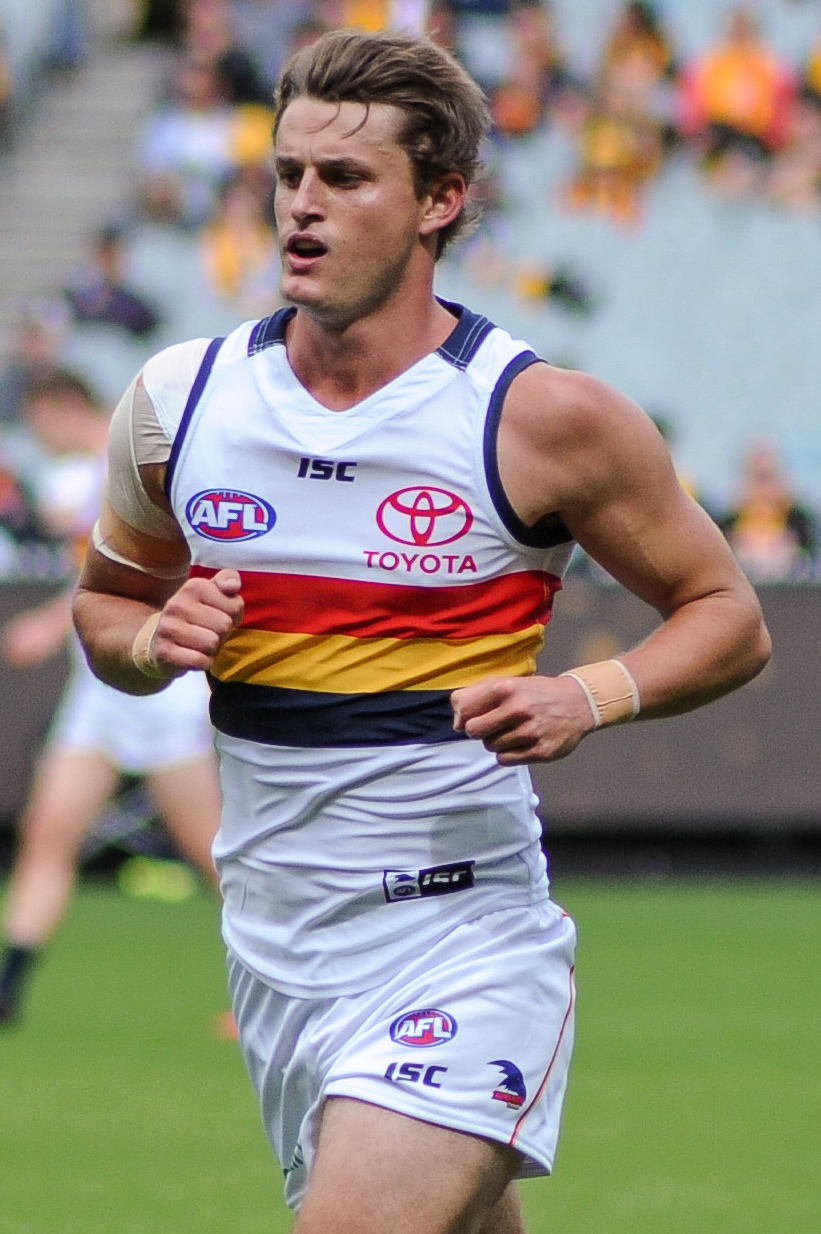
- Crouch playing for Adelaide in April 2017

Personal information
- Full name: Matthew Crouch
- Born: 21 April 1995 (age 31); Ballarat, Victoria, Australia
- Original teams: Ballarat Football Club (Junior Football); Beaufort (CHFL); North Ballarat Rebels (TAC Cup)
- Draft: No. 23, 2013 national draft
- Debut: Round 3, 2014, Adelaide vs. Sydney, at Adelaide Oval
- Height: 181 cm (5 ft 11 in)
- Weight: 80 kg (176 lb)
- Position: Midfielder

Playing career
Years	Club	Games (Goals)
2014–2025	Adelaide	164 (31)

Career highlights
- Malcolm Blight Medal: 2017; All Australian Team: 2017; Showdown Medal: Round 22, 2016; 22under22 team: 2017; 2014 AFL Rising Star nominee

Matt Crouch (born 21 April 1995) is a former professional Australian rules footballer who played for the Adelaide Football Club in the Australian Football League (AFL). He was recruited by the Adelaide Football Club with pick 23 in the 2013 national draft. Crouch won the Malcolm Blight Medal in 2017, a year where Adelaide finished first on the ladder. He is the younger brother of former teammate Brad Crouch.

== AFL career ==
=== Early career ===
Crouch made his AFL debut for the Crows in round 3 of the 2014 season, collecting 18 disposals in a heavy loss to Sydney. Crouch earned a nomination for the AFL Rising Star after having 28 disposals to three quarter time against Greater Western Sydney, at which point he was substituted out of the game. In total Crouch played eight matches in his first year in the AFL, and averaged 33 possessions and 8 clearances in ten matches for Adelaide's reserves side, polling 12 votes in the Magarey Medal.

Crouch had an interrupted 2015 pre-season due to an ankle injury suffered just prior to Christmas. He recovered to have a breakout year, playing 17 games including Adelaide's two finals and averaging 21 possessions. At the end of the season he was rewarded with the club's Mark Bickley Emerging Talent Award. He also signed a three-year contract with Adelaide after the 2015 season, keeping him at the club until 2018.

=== Prime years ===
In 2017, Crouch lifted his game to a new level, averaging 33 disposals per game and finishing second in the AFL for disposals after the regular season, and during the finals broke Dane Swan's AFL record for most disposals in a complete season with 825. He was selected in the 2017 All-Australian team and nominated by his club for the AFL Players Association MVP Award. Crouch was Adelaide's best player in the 2017 AFL Grand Final loss to Richmond, collecting 37 disposals, which at the time was an equal-second Grand Final record. In late August, Crouch was named The Age's Player of the Year and won the Malcolm Blight Medal as Adelaide Football Club's best and fairest winner for 2017. In January 2018 Crouch re-signed with the Crows until the end of 2021.

=== Injuries and retirement ===
Crouch sat out the 2021 AFL season due to a groin injury, needed surgery only a year after undergoing hip surgery. After speculation that Matt Crouch would depart the Crows with his free agency rights, Crouch re-signed at Adelaide for two years, keeping him at the club until the end of 2023. Crouch returned to the AFL in round one of the 2022 AFL season against the Fremantle Dockers and did so with great success, collecting a cool 30 disposals.

In 2024, Crouch was back to his best form, averaging 30 disposals for the year. His season looked to be cut short after requiring shoulder surgery from an injury sustained in the round 12 loss to Hawthorn. However, Crouch made a miraculous recovery and returned to the side in round 21 against Geelong. Following the Crows' loss to Port Adelaide in the round 23 Showdown, Crouch was seen on video knocking off the hat of a supporter. A police investigation was conducted regarding allegations that the interaction could be classed as assault, but all charges were dropped.

Early in the 2025 season, Crouch's hip soreness returned following his surgery in 2020. He missed one game against Gold Coast, but not long after his return he re-injured his hip, this time ruling him out for up to six weeks.

In August 2025, following an injury-riddled 2025 campaign, Crouch announced his retirement from AFL football effective immediately.

== Honours & Achievements ==
Team

- AFL minor premiership: (Adelaide) 2017, 2025
- McClelland Trophy: (Adelaide) 2017

Individual

- All-Australian team: 2017
- Malcolm Blight Medal: 2017
- Showdown Medal: Round 22, 2016
- 22under22 team: 2017
- 2014 AFL Rising Star nominee

== Statistics ==
Legend
G	Goals	K	Kicks	D	Disposals	T	Tackles
B	Behinds	H	Handballs	M	Marks

Season	Team	No.	Games	Totals							Averages (per game)							Votes
Season	Team	No.	Games	G	B	K	H	D	M	T	G	B	K	H	D	M	T	Votes
2014	Adelaide	44	8	3	2	63	69	132	26	26	0.4	0.3	7.9	8.6	16.5	3.3	3.3	0
2015	Adelaide	44	17	2	6	145	212	357	45	57	0.1	0.4	8.5	12.5	21.0	2.6	3.4	0
2016	Adelaide	44	22	5	3	250	359	609	75	100	0.2	0.1	11.4	16.3	27.7	3.4	4.5	7
2017	Adelaide	44	25	7	7	345	480	825^{†}	76	119	0.3	0.3	13.8	19.2	33.0	3.0	4.8	11
2018	Adelaide	5	18	2	3	249	331	580	69	70	0.1	0.2	13.8	18.4	32.2	3.8	3.9	8
2019	Adelaide	5	19	7	4	270	350	620	77	65	0.4	0.2	14.2	18.4	32.6	4.1	3.4	8
2020 (Note: The 2020 season was played with 17 home-and-away matches per team (down from 22) and 16-minute quarters with time on (down from 20-minute quarters with time on) due to the impact of the COVID-19 pandemic.)	Adelaide	5	16	2	3	163	256	419	44	74	0.1	0.2	10.2	16.0	26.2	2.8	4.6	3
2022	Adelaide	5	11	0	0	115	186	301	39	44	0.0	0.0	10.5	16.9	27.4	3.5	4.0	0
2023	Adelaide	5	7	2	0	55	132	187	18	35	0.3	0.0	7.9	18.9	26.7	2.6	5.0	0
2024	Adelaide	5	15	0	2	155	294	449	62	79	0.0	0.1	10.3	19.6^{†}	29.9	4.1	5.3	4
2025	Adelaide	5	6	1	0	48	106	154	18	24	0.2	0.0	8.0	17.7	25.7	3.0	4.0	1
Career			164	31	30	1858	2775	4633	549	693	0.2	0.2	11.3	16.9	28.3	3.3	4.2	42
