= Tom Lynch (Australian footballer, born 1990) =

Australian rules footballer (born 1990)

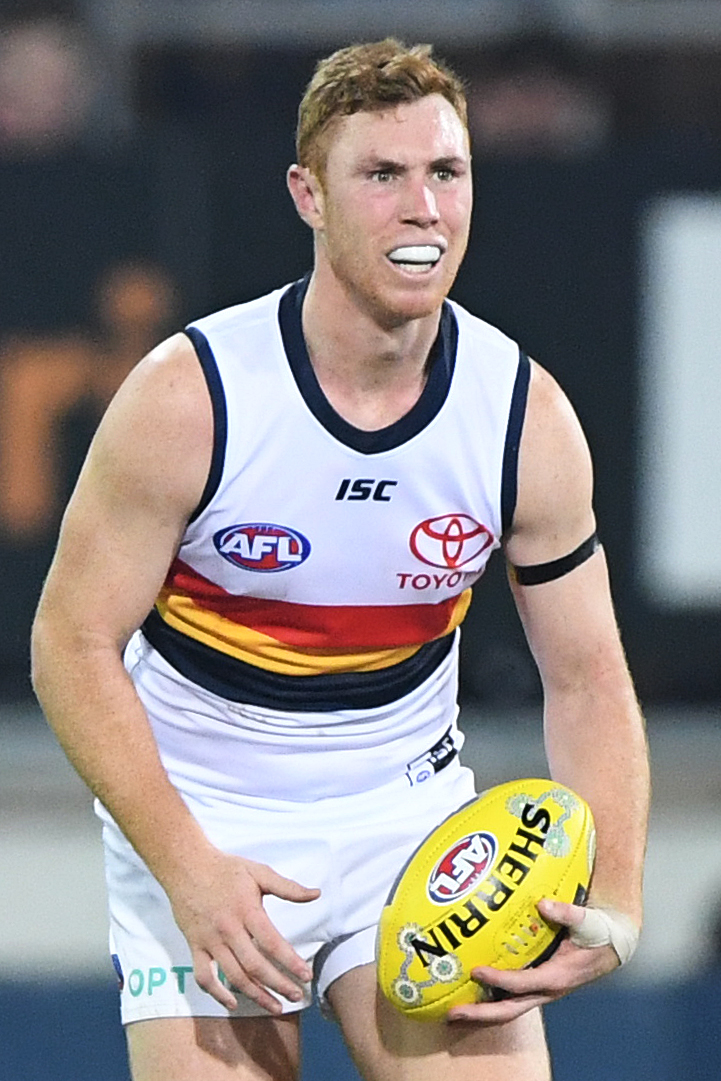
- Lynch playing for Adelaide in June 2019

Personal information
- Full name: Thomas Telford Lynch
- Nicknames: Tig, The Chief
- Born: 15 September 1990 (age 36)
- Original teams: Beaumaris; Haileybury College; Sandringham Dragons (TAC Cup)
- Draft: No. 13, 2008 national draft
- Debut: Round 18, 2010, St Kilda vs. Essendon, at Etihad Stadium
- Height: 191 cm (6 ft 3 in)
- Weight: 87 kg (192 lb)
- Position: Key forward

Playing career^{1}
Years	Club	Games (Goals)
2009–2011	St Kilda	6 (4)
2012–2021	Adelaide	158 (199)
2022	North Melbourne	0 (0)
Total		164 (203)

Coaching career^{3}
Years	Club	Games (W–L–D)
2023–	North Melbourne (VFL)	19 (10–9–0)
- ^{1} Playing statistics correct to the end of round 11, 2026.^{3} Coaching statistics correct as of 2023.

Career highlights
- Adelaide leading goalkicker (2013); Showdown Medal (round 2, 2016)

Thomas Telford Lynch (born 15 September 1990) is a former professional Australian rules football player who played for St Kilda Football Club, Adelaide Football Club and North Melbourne Football Club in the Australian Football League (AFL).

Lynch was recruited by St Kilda from Sandringham Dragons Under 18 TAC Cup team with pick 13 in the 2008 National Draft.

== AFL career ==
=== St Kilda (2009–2011) ===
Although Lynch was St Kilda's first pick in the 2008 AFL draft, he did not play senior football in 2009. He made his AFL debut in round 18 of the 2010 season against Essendon. He had five disposals and was dropped for the following week's match.

Lynch played five games in 2011 and kicked four goals, including two in a game against North Melbourne. At the end of the season, Lynch was traded from St Kilda to Adelaide as part of a three-way deal with Richmond, who received ruckman Ivan Maric from Adelaide whilst trading pick 37 to St Kilda.

=== Adelaide (2012–2021) ===
Lynch played his first game for the Crows in the first round of the 2012 season. He went on to play six games in his first season at the Crows, but he became a regular member of the team in the 2013 season, playing 17 matches and leading Adelaide's goalkicking with 33 goals. This included a 10-goal game against Greater Western Sydney, making Lynch only the third player to score ten or more goals in a game for Adelaide. In 2014, however, Lynch suffered a wretched run of injuries, including a dislocated shoulder in a pre-season trial game; a broken jaw in a collision with Melbourne's Jack Viney in round 7; and, after a late-season return, a season-ending fractured neck in a collision against the Brisbane Lions in Round 20. In total, he played eight games, and only one where he was available and uninjured for the whole game: a 25-disposal, two-goal effort against the Western Bulldogs in Round 6.

Lynch established himself in Adelaide's forward line in 2015, playing all 23 games, kicking 32 goals and having 30 goal assists, the most for the season by any player. Late in the season he signed a new three-year contract with the Crows.

In Round 7 of 2017, he was tackled to the ground heavily by North Melbourne player Jarrad Waite in the second quarter, getting concussed and not being able to return to the ground for the rest of the match. Later in the season, Lynch was hospitalized with viral meningitis, but he bounced back from it in Round 17 against Melbourne, managing 27 possessions, 11 marks and three goals for the match.

He was not offered a contract by Adelaide for the 2022 season and was delisted at the conclusion of the 2021 season.

=== North Melbourne (2022) ===
After being delisted by Adelaide, Lynch joined North Melbourne as a development coach in November 2021. He was later signed to the club's list ahead of the 2022 AFL season as part of the supplemental selection period (SSP). Lynch officially retired from playing on 31 May 2022 to make space for the mid-season draft.

In October 2022, Lynch was awarded the full-time VFL senior coaching position of the North Melbourne Football Club.

== Personal life ==
Lynch has served as an ambassador for the RSPCA greyhound adoption plan.

== Statistics ==
Statistics are correct to end of season 2022

Legend
G	Goals	K	Kicks	D	Disposals	T	Tackles
B	Behinds	H	Handballs	M	Marks

Season	Team	No.	Games	Totals							Averages (per game)						
Season	Team	No.	Games	G	B	K	H	D	M	T	G	B	K	H	D	M	T
2010	St Kilda	29	1	0	1	3	2	5	3	0	0.0	1.0	3.0	2.0	5.0	3.0	0.0
2011	St Kilda	29	5	4	1	28	26	54	16	13	0.8	0.2	5.6	5.2	10.8	3.2	2.6
2012	Adelaide	27	6	7	5	50	9	59	31	8	1.2	0.8	8.3	1.5	9.8	5.2	1.3
2013	Adelaide	27	17	33	20	199	95	294	125	31	1.9	1.2	11.7	5.6	17.3	7.4	1.8
2014	Adelaide	27	8	7	7	68	41	109	35	13	0.9	0.9	8.5	5.1	13.6	4.4	1.6
2015	Adelaide	27	23	32	16	292	143	435	158	43	1.4	0.7	12.7	6.2	18.9	6.9	1.9
2016	Adelaide	27	23	42	21	277	171	448	150	45	1.8	0.9	12.0	7.4	19.4	6.5	2.0
2017	Adelaide	27	23	31	23	297	175	472	163	50	1.4	1.0	12.9	7.6	20.5	7.1	2.2
2018	Adelaide	27	17	16	8	201	131	332	97	28	0.9	0.5	11.8	7.7	19.5	5.7	1.6
2019	Adelaide	27	16	17	13	213	113	326	116	29	1.1	0.8	13.3	7.1	20.4	7.3	1.8
2020 (Note: The 2020 season was played with 17 home-and-away matches per team (down from 22) and 16-minute quarters with time on (down from 20-minute quarters with time on) due to the impact of the COVID-19 pandemic.)	Adelaide	27	13	6	5	144	78	222	53	13	0.5	0.2	11.1	6.0	17.1	4.1	1.0
2021	Adelaide	27	16	17	13	213	113	326	116	29	1.1	0.8	13.3	7.1	20.4	7.3	1.8
2022	North Melbourne	–	0	–	–	–	–	–	–	–	–	–	–	–	–	–	–
Career			164	203	129	1901	1070	2971	1011	281	1.2	0.8	11.6	6.5	18.1	6.2	1.7
