= David Mackay (footballer) =

Australian rules footballer (born 1988)

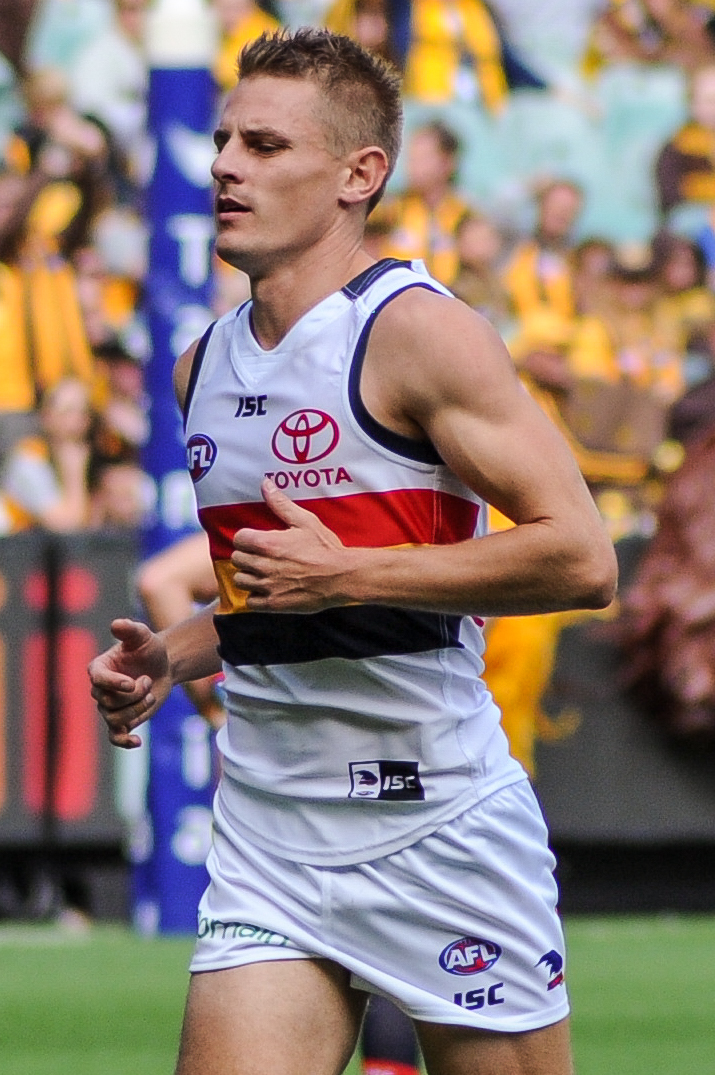
- Mackay playing for Adelaide in April 2017

Personal information
- Full name: David Mackay
- Nickname: D-Mac
- Born: 25 July 1988 (age 38)
- Original teams: Beverley Hills (YJFL); Trinity Grammar School (AGSV); Oakleigh Chargers (TAC Cup)
- Draft: No. 48, 2006 national draft
- Debut: Round 1, 2008, Adelaide vs. Western Bulldogs, at Telstra Dome
- Height: 181 cm (5 ft 11 in)
- Weight: 78 kg (172 lb)
- Position: Midfield/Half-back

Playing career^{1}
Years	Club	Games (Goals)
2007–2021	Adelaide	248 (68)
- ^{1} Playing statistics correct to the end of 2021.

David Mackay (born 25 July 1988) is a retired professional Australian rules football player who played for the Adelaide Football Club in the Australian Football League (AFL). He was drafted by the club at pick 48 in the 2006 National Draft and stayed with the team until he retired at the end of the 2021 season. He played 248 games for Adelaide and was part of their team in the 2017 AFL Grand Final.

== Pre-AFL career ==
Mackay played his junior football for Beverley Hills JFC before progressing to the Oakleigh Chargers. He appeared in the 2006 Victorian U/18 Metro side where he was inspirational in the grand final. He attended Trinity Grammar School, noted for producing star footballers including Wayne Schwass and Luke Power, and was House Captain of the school's Hindley House. Fellow 2006 draft pick Todd Goldstein was vice-captain of the same house.

== AFL career ==
After a 2007 ruined by a recurring hamstring injury, Mackay made his debut for Adelaide in round 1 of the 2008 AFL season, in a loss to the Western Bulldogs. He played 19 games for the season, missing only four, and kicked his first AFL goal in round 17 against Sydney. He again was a regular for the side in 2009, playing 20 matches, and by this early stage of his career was rated a vital part of the Crows' young midfield. He played 16 games in 2010.

In the first round of 2011, Mackay suffered a shoulder injury and underwent surgery that kept him out for three months. He returned late in the season and showed good form, impressing both with his offensive running and defensive pressure. Mackay benefited from improved strength and durability the next season, playing 23 games and averaging 17 possessions and four tackles per game, while playing both in the midfield and across half-back. At the end of the year he signed a three-year contract extension.

Much like the team as a whole, Mackay struggled for consistency in 2013. He recaptured his best form in 2014, playing 19 games, averaging 18 disposals and kicking a personal best 11 goals for the year. He signed a four-year contract extension midway through the season.

Mackay started 2015 in good form, laying a career-best 13 tackles along with 23 disposals against Melbourne in wet conditions in round 3. However, his old inconsistency resurfaced resulting in him being dropped late in the year. He returned to the side to play in Adelaide's two finals. At the end of 2016 he was made a life member of the Adelaide Football Club. As part of his preparation for the 2017 season, Mackay spent as much time in the backline over the pre-season as he did in the midfield due to coach Don Pyke’s emphasis on flexibility.

Against Hawthorn in round 2, Mackay tackled Paul Puopolo to the ground in the third quarter. Though the tackle appeared fair, the pair of players continued rolling, ending up with Mackay lying on Puopolo’s back and a free kick was paid against Mackay for a push in the back. The free kick was seen as questionable and prompted divided reaction on social media. In the Showdown the next week, he kicked one of the goals of his career, snapping from the boundary line, bringing the Crows back within a goal of Port Adelaide in a pivotal moment of the game.

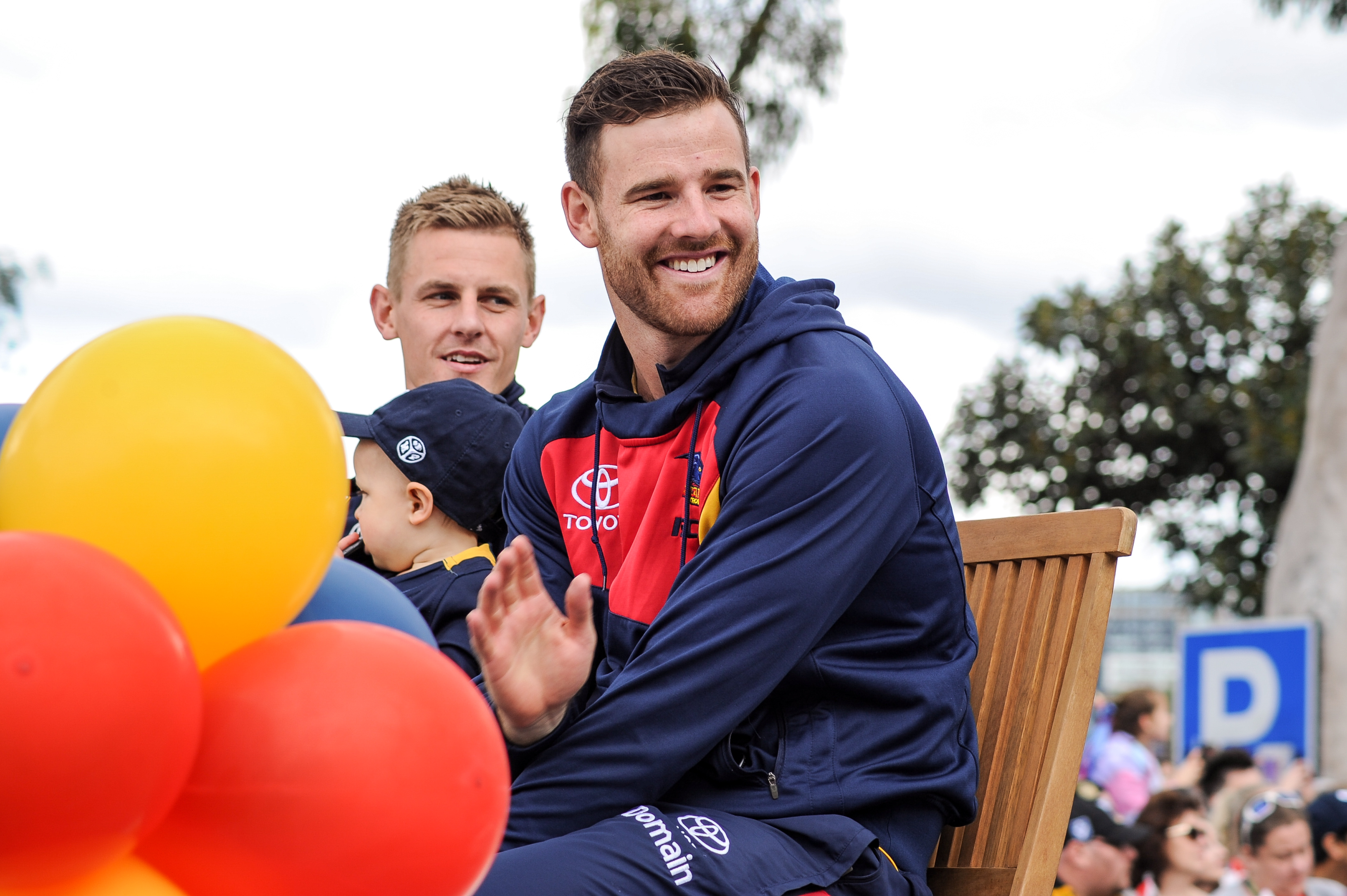
Mackay and Andy Otten during the 2017 AFL Grand Final parade

Mackay was dropped from several matches throughout the season and played for the reserves in the SANFL, where he was told to work on his toughness at the contest. When he came back to the AFL side, the result was he increased the number of tackles he made per game from three to five. When teammate Brodie Smith injured his anterior cruciate ligament, Mackay had to shift from his usual position on the wing to half-back to replace the former All-Australian in the finals. Mackay ended up playing in Adelaide's first grand final since 1998, which they lost to Richmond by 48 points.

In June 2021, Mackay was sent to the AFL Tribunal for a collision with St Kilda player Hunter Clark. Mackay and Clark clashed while competing for the ball on the ground. Clark suffered a broken jaw as a result of the collision and underwent surgery on multiple jaw fractures in the following week. The injury meant Clark was not expected to be able to play for at least six weeks. Mackay was not reported for the incident by the game umpires, but the AFL's match review officer, Michael Christian, referred the incident directly to the tribunal. This went against the precedent set earlier in the season where similar incidents, also resulting in head injuries, were not referred to the tribunal because the players involved were contesting the ball. Christian did not grade the incident on the table of offences, meaning the incident served as a test case for future incidents. The AFL argued that Mackay been careless and unreasonable in his conduct, leading to Clark's injury, while Mackay's lawyer argued that it was an accidental collision and Mackay had done what he needed to protect himself. The tribunal ruled Mackay was not guilty.

Mackay retired from football at the end of the 2021 season, having played 248 AFL games. At the time, this was the ninth-most games of any player for the Adelaide Crows.

== Statistics ==
Statistics are correct to the end of the 2021 AFL season.

Legend
G	Goals	K	Kicks	D	Disposals	T	Tackles
B	Behinds	H	Handballs	M	Marks

Season	Team	No.	Games	Totals							Averages (per game)						
Season	Team	No.	Games	G	B	K	H	D	M	T	G	B	K	H	D	M	T
2008	Adelaide	14	19	4	2	136	106	242	72	31	0.2	0.1	7.2	5.6	12.7	3.8	1.6
2009	Adelaide	14	20	7	4	184	220	404	74	56	0.4	0.2	9.2	11.0	20.2	3.7	2.8
2010	Adelaide	14	16	1	4	146	156	302	55	33	0.1	0.3	9.1	9.8	18.9	3.4	2.1
2011	Adelaide	14	8	3	3	77	48	125	19	25	0.4	0.4	9.6	6.0	15.6	2.4	3.1
2012	Adelaide	14	23	9	6	211	178	389	89	96	0.4	0.3	9.2	7.7	16.9	3.9	4.2
2013	Adelaide	14	19	6	7	172	143	315	67	66	0.3	0.4	9.1	7.5	16.6	3.5	3.5
2014	Adelaide	14	19	11	7	168	174	342	58	77	0.6	0.4	8.8	9.2	18.0	3.1	4.1
2015	Adelaide	14	20	3	3	154	122	276	43	72	0.2	0.2	7.7	6.1	13.8	2.2	3.6
2016	Adelaide	14	19	2	12	197	179	376	49	82	0.1	0.6	10.4	9.4	19.8	2.6	4.3
2017	Adelaide	14	22	9	8	227	144	371	66	76	0.4	0.4	10.3	6.5	16.9	3.0	3.5
2018	Adelaide	14	17	2	6	180	103	283	57	46	0.1	0.4	10.6	6.1	16.7	3.4	2.7
2019	Adelaide	14	18	3	1	185	125	310	57	50	0.2	0.1	10.3	6.9	17.2	3.2	2.8
2020	Adelaide	14	10	2	2	73	82	155	25	16	0.2	0.2	7.3	8.2	15.5	2.5	1.6
2021	Adelaide	14	18	6	6	147	93	240	42	40	0.3	0.3	8.2	5.2	13.3	2.3	2.2
Career			248	68	17	2257	1873	4130	773	766	0.3	0.3	9.1	7.6	16.7	3.1	3.1

== After AFL ==
After retiring from playing, Mackay joined the Hawthorn Football Club and their VFL affiliate Box Hill Football Club as part of their coaching staff. In 2022 he had a coaching role in the VFL program and was the midfield coach of Hawthorn's women's team. In 2023, he became Hawthorn's development coach. Ahead of the 2024 season, Mackay became the assistant coach of the Midfield.

== Personal life ==
In 2014, Mackay married his longtime partner Sarah Endersbee.
