= Brad Crouch =

Australian rules footballer (born 1994)

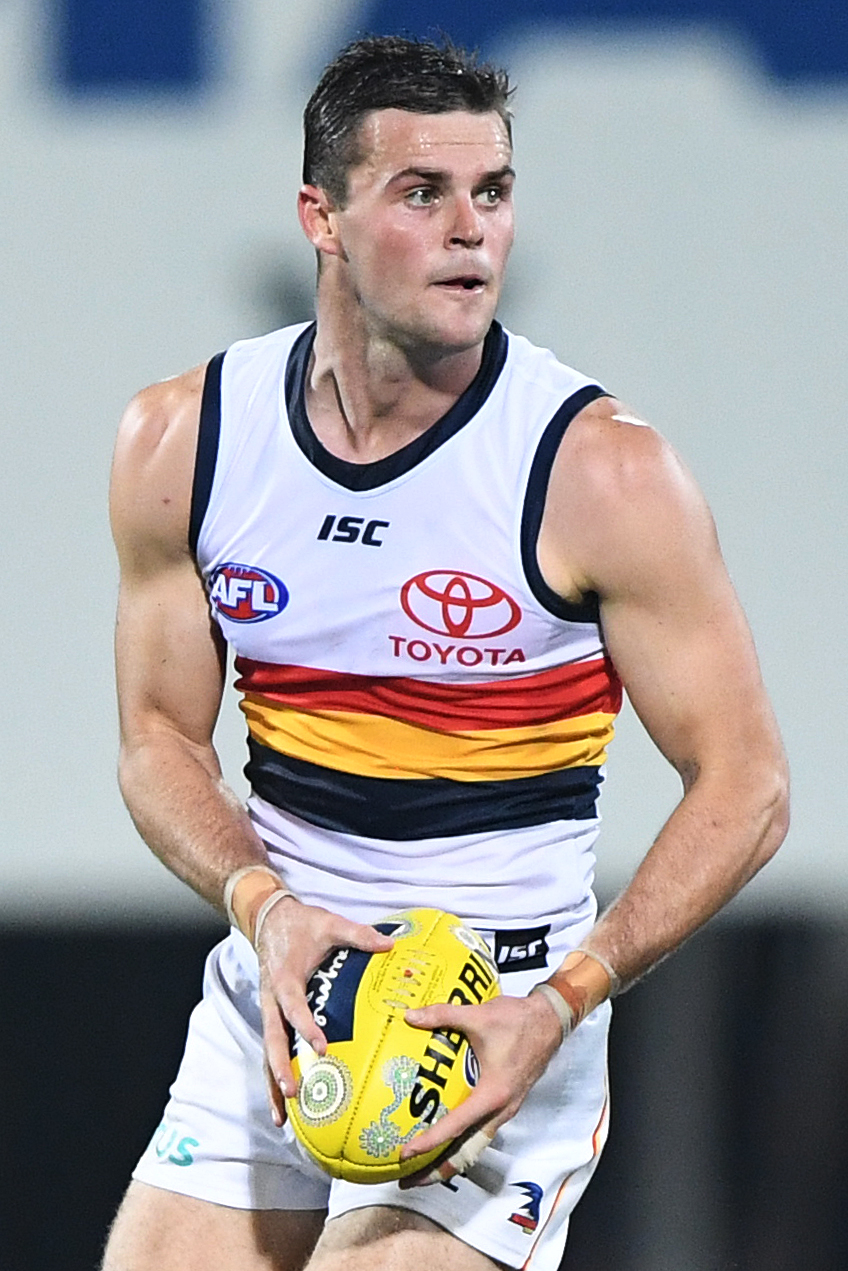
- Crouch playing in June 2019.

Personal information
- Full name: Bradley Crouch
- Born: 14 January 1994 (age 32)
- Original team: North Ballarat Rebels (TAC Cup)
- Draft: No. 2, 2011 mini-draft
- Height: 186 cm (6 ft 1 in)
- Weight: 86 kg (190 lb)
- Position: Midfielder

Playing career
Years	Club	Games (Goals)
2013–2020	Adelaide	95 (34)
2021–2024	St Kilda	66 (22)
Total		161 (56)

Career highlights
- Malcolm Blight Medal: 2019; Ian Stewart Medal: 2022; Silk Miller Medal: 2023; 2013 AFL Rising Star: nominee

Bradley Crouch (born 14 January 1994) is a former professional Australian rules footballer who played for the Adelaide Football Club and the St Kilda Football Club in the Australian Football League (AFL). He was recruited by the Adelaide Football Club with the second selection in the 2011 mini-draft. He is the older brother and former teammate of Matt Crouch. Crouch and his family are from Beaufort, near Ballarat in Victoria.

== AFL career ==
=== Early Adelaide career ===
Playing for Vic Country in the 2011 AFL Under 18 Championships, Crouch was named in the Under-18 All-Australian side as a half-back flanker. After this, he was drafted a year earlier than usual under the 2011 mini-draft rules, and was not permitted to play in 2012. Instead, he played for West Adelaide in the SANFL. However, he did get special clearance from the AFL to play one pre-season game for Adelaide against the Brisbane Lions in Alice Springs. During the season he injured his hamstring and missed out on two months of football.

Despite playing a major role in the 2013 pre-season, Crouch did not play in the Crows' first game for the season. After impressing in the SANFL, Crouch made his AFL debut in Round 2, 2013, against the Brisbane Lions at the Gabba. After struggling with hamstring injuries early in the season, he played the last 10 games in succession, immediately establishing himself as one of the club's premier midfielders, and winning an AFL Rising Star nomination in round 14 after a breakout performance against Gold Coast which included 31 possessions and a game-high 6 tackles. He finished second in the Rising Star award to then Gold Coast youngster and current Fremantle midfielder Jaeger O'Meara, and also won Adelaide's Emerging Talent Award. At the end of 2013, Crouch signed a three-year contract extension, keeping him at the Crows until the end of 2016, and his brother Matt Crouch was drafted in the 2013 AFL draft to join him at the club.

Crouch continued to struggle with injury over the next couple of years. In 2014 he suffered a fractured leg in the round two Showdown, which allowed his brother Matt Crouch to make his debut the next week. The two brothers played together at senior level for the first time in the SANFL for the Crows' reserves side in Round 9 when Crouch had recovered from his latest injury. He returned to the AFL side in Round 15, coincidentally for the next Showdown, and went on to play the final nine games of the year, before a foot injury prevented him from playing a game in 2015.

=== 2016 ===
After Crows star Patrick Dangerfield left the club to play for Geelong, there was pressure on Crouch to help fill the void in the club's midfield in 2016, compounded by the fact that there were still question marks on whether his body would stay fit enough to play consistently. Even worse for Crouch in the pre-season, he was dropped to the reserves before the season had even begun for disciplinary reasons. He was able to make his way into the senior side for the first round and played well, but he was pulled from the side in Round 3 due to hamstring soreness. This injury forced him to stay out of the side for two weeks before he returned to the reserves side with an impressive 36 possessions and 10 clearances. He returned to the AFL for the Crows' Round 7 clash with the Western Bulldogs, but was dropped from the side again two weeks later. His form improved over the next month in the reserves and he forced his way back into the side in Round 14. He again recaptured his best form towards the end of the season, playing the final 12 games during which he averaged 25 disposals. Despite speculation during the season that Crouch would reject new contract offers from Adelaide and ask for a trade to another club, he accepted a four-year extension worth approximately $2.4 million towards the end of the season, keeping him at the club until 2020.

=== 2017 and grand final appearance ===
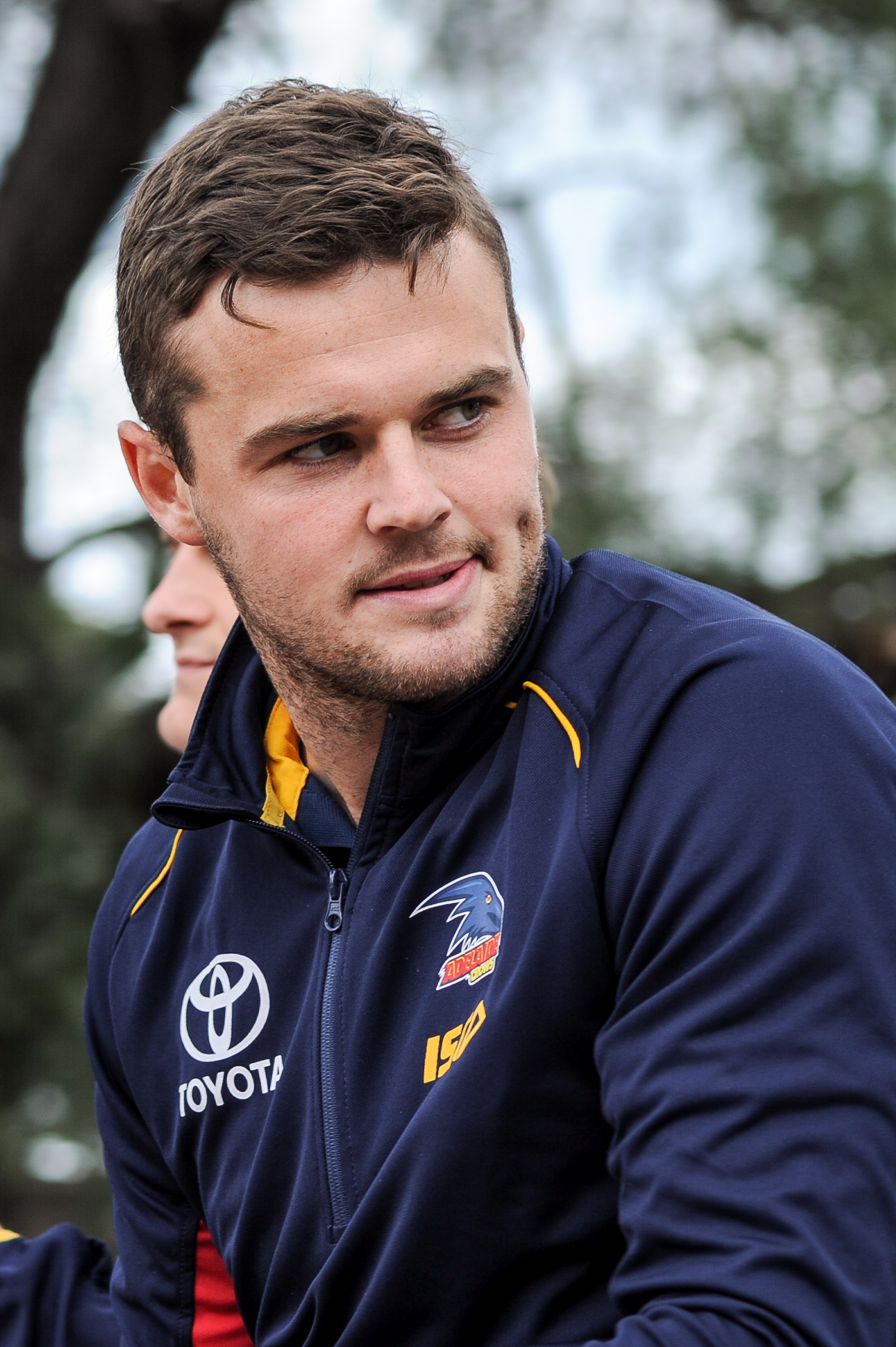
Crouch at the 2017 AFL Grand Final parade

Crouch suffered a hamstring injury in 2017 that ruled him out of the entire pre-season and put him in doubt for round 1 of the regular season. He played in the SANFL for the first few rounds of the season due to concerns that he would struggle in the AFL after missing a large amount of the pre-season. His SANFL form, 40 and 31 disposals in back to back games, warranted his return to the AFL side in Round 5 against the Gold Coast Suns, where he amassed 22 disposals to half time and 33 for the match in a 67-point win. His form continued to improve, as did his brother's. In the Crows' Round 18 match against Geelong, Crouch fractured his cheekbone in the third quarter, but fought through the pain and played out the rest of the match. He had to have surgery and missed out on the next game. In the final round of the home and away season in the last AFL game ever played at Subiaco Oval, Crouch and his brother needed a combined 60 disposals to break a record for the most disposals in an AFL season by brothers, previously held by Kane Cornes and Chad Cornes from cross-town rivals Port Adelaide. By half-time, they already had 50 disposals between them. They passed the Cornes brothers late in the third quarter and had a total of 87 disposals by the end of the match, making the new record 1,202 disposals. He finished the season playing in the 2017 AFL Grand Final against Richmond, which the Crows lost by 48 points.

=== 2019–2020 ===
After missing the entire 2018 season with a groin injury, Crouch went on to become one of seven Crows to play all 22 games in 2019. He averaged 30 disposals a game and won the Malcolm Blight Medal as the Crows' best and fairest. Crouch received a season-high 18 of a possible 20 medal votes in Adelaide’s win over Richmond in Round 13, collecting a career-high 43 disposals, 11 clearances, six inside-50s and four rebound-50s. Crouch averaged a career-best 30.2 disposals (ranked eighth across the AFL home and away season) and finished second at the Club for clearances and tackles with totals of 117 and 111. The midfielder also made 86 inside-50s - the most of any Crow that season - to go with 11 goals. He also collected 14 Brownlow votes, and received the maximum three votes in two games - Round 11 and Round 13. At the conclusion of the season, Crouch's management explored potential suitors at rival clubs which eventually culminated in a requested a trade to the Gold Coast Suns following interest from St Kilda and Geelong. Crouch sought a move to a club willing to pay a $5 million contract over five seasons. Late in the Trade Period Crouch approached the Suns and lowered his asking price in a bid to complete a trade. The Gold Coast board ultimately blocked the deal given the high draft pick cost of completing the trade and their commitment to securing the services of Matt Rowell and Noah Anderson in the upcoming draft.

Crouch played the first eight rounds of the shortened 2020 season before sustaining a hamstring injury. Crouch rejoined the side in round 15 and played the final four games of the season. In shortened 16-minute quarters and a 17-game season due to the Coronavirus Pandemic, Crouch averaged 22 disposals a game, collecting a season-high 31 disposals in the Crows' upset win over GWS in round 16. Crouch, along with former teammate Tyson Stengle was reprimanded in October 2020 for 'conduct unbecoming' after both were searched by South Australian Police on 28 September and found to be in possession of an illicit substance. The AFL elected to ban the pair for matches in 2021 (as the season had concluded) with Stengle banned for four matches and Crouch banned for two. The conduct of Stengle and Crouch’s constitutes a notifiable adverse finding under the AFL’s Illicit Drugs Policy.

=== St Kilda: 2021–2024 ===
On 21 October, Crouch nominated St Kilda as his preferred destination during the Free Agency Period following a contract offer from the club. Crouch was a restricted free agent under AFL rules, meaning the Crows were able to match the contract offer from the Saints to force a trade. Crouch had also attracted interest from Geelong, Richmond and Port Adelaide, although it is understood that only the Saints were prepared to offer a five-year contract. On 1 November, the Saints lodged the paperwork for Crouch, with the Crows having three days to decide whether or not to match the bid. Crouch himself spoke publicly of his desire for the Crows not to match the bid, stating that "I want them to not match. I've told St Kilda I'm fully committed to them, so I want to see that out. At this stage I just want to be at St Kilda and the decision I've made I'm fully committed to them." He officially joined St Kilda on 4 November after Adelaide decided not to match at the deadline of 5 pm. Adelaide received draft pick number 23 as compensation. On deciding on St Kilda, Crouch stated that “I think the main thing that attracted me to the Saints was the history. We haven’t won a flag in a long time and it would be pretty cool to be a part of that if we could get one over the line in the next few years. I think that really excited me in comparison to going to one of the teams that have been successful in the last five to 10 years and chasing the flag with them."

Following his two-game suspension, Crouch made his debut for St Kilda in Round 3, 2021, against Essendon. He played his 100th AFL game in Round 7 against Hawthorn and had 32 disposals and 7 clearances. In round 12 against the Swans, Crouch had a prolific game collecting 38 disposals, 14 contested possessions, 7 clearances, 7 tackles and 12 score involvements. At the mid-point of the season, Crouch had strongly embedded himself in the Saints' best 22. Despite missing the first two games of the season, Crouch was second for St Kilda's disposals, centre clearances and contested possessions and third for effective disposals. Between round 6 and 13, Crouch averaged 30 disposals a game. Against his former club Adelaide in round 13, Crouch had 36 disposals, 6 tackles, f5 clearances and 19 contested possessions, the second week in a row he had greater than 35 disposals. Crouch ultimately played 20 games (all consecutive), missing just the two opening rounds with suspension. He finished the season second for St Kilda’s total disposals (527), handballs (279), contested possessions (224), ground-ball gets (147), clearances (98), tackles (109) and effective disposals (345). He averaged 27 disposals, 5 clearances and 6 tackles per game. He finished equal fifth in the Saints' best and fairest, the Trevor Barker Award.

=== Retirement ===
After being delisted at the end of the 2024 season, Crouch was re-drafted through the Rookie Draft, however subsequently announced his immediate retirement on 26 November due to degenerative knee issues.

== Statistics ==
Legend
G	Goals	K	Kicks	D	Disposals	T	Tackles
B	Behinds	H	Handballs	M	Marks

Season	Team	No.	Games	Totals							Averages (per game)							Votes
Season	Team	No.	Games	G	B	K	H	D	M	T	G	B	K	H	D	M	T	Votes
2013	Adelaide	2	14	4	5	158	185	343	61	62	0.3	0.4	11.3	13.2	24.5	4.4	4.4	6
2014	Adelaide	2	11	5	6	125	147	272	26	61	0.5	0.5	11.4	13.4	24.7	2.4	5.5	0
2015	Adelaide	2	0	—	—	—	—	—	—	—	—	—	—	—	—	—	—	0
2016	Adelaide	2	16	4	1	155	213	368	26	102	0.3	0.1	9.7	13.3	23.0	1.6	6.4	4
2017	Adelaide	2	20	8	10	237	324	561	56	137	0.4	0.5	11.9	16.2	28.1	2.8	6.9	3
2018	Adelaide	2	0	—	—	—	—	—	—	—	—	—	—	—	—	—	—	0
2019	Adelaide	2	22	11	12	338	327	665	65	111	0.5	0.5	15.4	14.9	30.2	3.0	5.0	14
2020 (Note: The 2020 season was played with 17 home-and-away matches per team (down from 22) and 16-minute quarters with time on (down from 20-minute quarters with time on) due to the impact of the COVID-19 pandemic.)	Adelaide	2	12	2	1	136	127	263	20	44	0.2	0.1	11.3	10.6	21.9	1.7	3.7	1
2021	St Kilda	5	20	7	5	248	279	527	56	109	0.4	0.3	12.4	14.0	26.4	2.8	5.5	5
2022	St Kilda	5	21	7	3	270	301	571	73	149	0.3	0.1	12.9	14.3	27.2	3.5	7.1	10
2023	St Kilda	5	24	8	6	292	359	651	90	142	0.3	0.3	12.2	15.0	27.1	3.8	5.9	18
2024	St Kilda	5	1	0	0	6	9	15	2	4	0.0	0.0	6.0	9.0	15.0	2.0	4.0	0
2025	St Kilda	5	0	—	—	—	—	—	—	—	—	—	—	—	—	—	—	0
Career			161	56	49	1965	2271	4236	475	921	0.3	0.3	12.2	14.1	26.3	3.0	5.7	61
