= Andy Otten =

Australian rules footballer

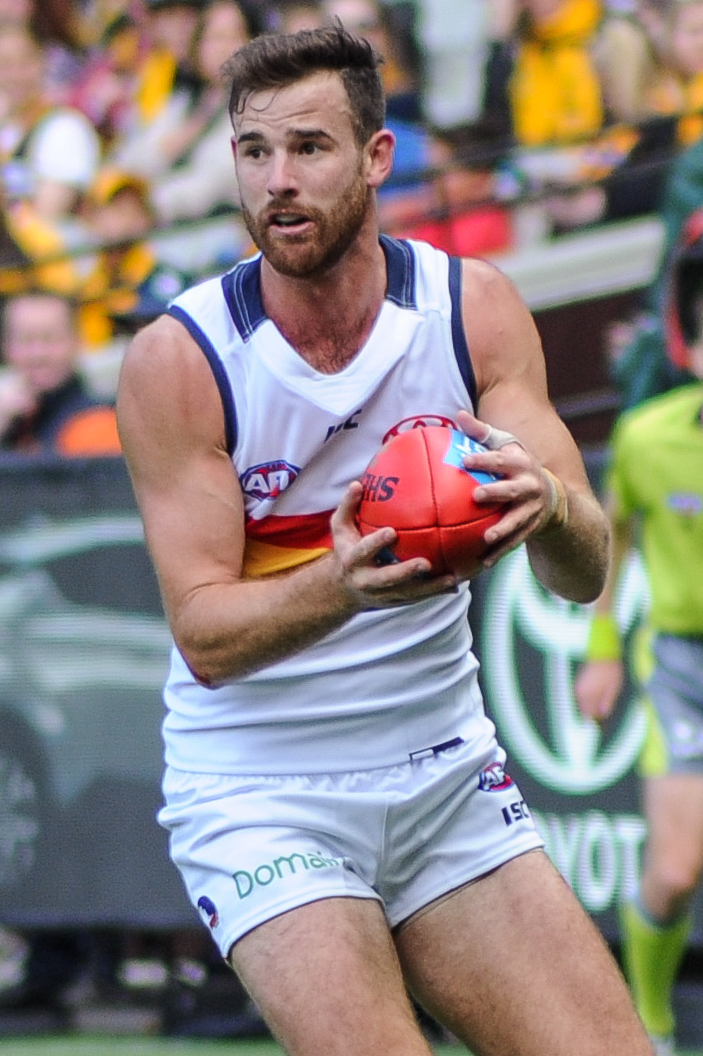
- Otten playing for Adelaide in April 2017

Personal information
- Full name: Andrew Otten
- Nickname: Otto
- Born: 15 May 1989 (age 37); Melbourne, Victoria
- Original team: Oakleigh Chargers (TAC Cup)
- Draft: No. 27, 2007 national draft
- Debut: Round 12, 2008, Adelaide vs. Hawthorn, at AAMI Stadium
- Height: 192 cm (6 ft 4 in)
- Weight: 92 kg (203 lb)
- Position: Utility

Playing career^{1}
Years	Club	Games (Goals)
2008–2019	Adelaide	109 (38)
- ^{1} Playing statistics correct to the end of 2019.

Career highlights
- 2009 AFL Rising Star nominee

Andrew Otten (born 15 February 1989) is a former professional Australian rules football player who played for the Adelaide Football Club in the Australian Football League (AFL). Otten was Adelaide’s second selection in the 2007 National Draft, pick 27 overall, having recorded strong results at the 2007 NAB AFL Draft Camp ranking in the top 2% for the vertical leap (92 cm), top ten for agility and the top 20% for the beep test (14.2).

== Early life ==
Otten attended Whitefriars College in Donvale, graduating in 2007. He played junior football for YJFL club Whitehorse Colts, located in Box Hill North. Otten played basketball in his teen years.

== AFL career ==
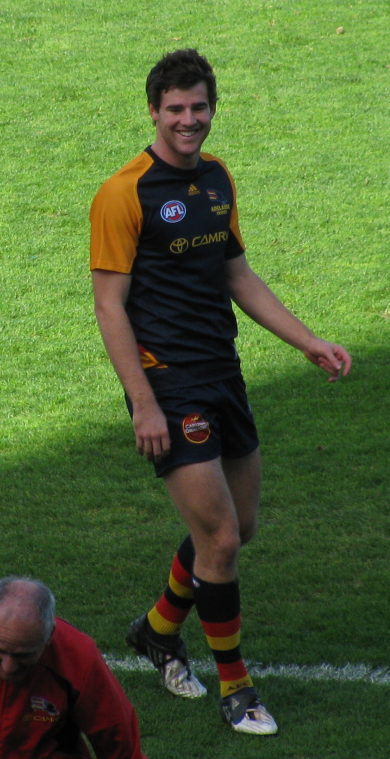
Otten in May 2009

Otten made his debut in round 12 against eventual premiers Hawthorn, and played one more game for the 2008 season. The next season, he exploded onto the AFL scene, playing a consistent role as Adelaide's third tall in defence and being likened to former defender Nathan Bassett. Otten won an AFL Rising Star nomination in round 9 for his performance against Carlton, in which he collected 23 possessions and kicked a goal, and at the end of the season was voted the runner-up in the ward to Daniel Rich. Otten also scored three votes in the 2009 Brownlow Medal count.

In his 2010 pre-season training, Otten ruptured his left ACL and missed the entire 2010 season as a result. He returned successfully in 2011, playing 15 games in defence and in the midfield. In 2012, however, he struggled with injuries and form, playing six games for the season including the Preliminary Final loss to Hawthorn.

Otten re-established himself in the side in 2013, playing every game and spending time up forward, where he kicked 15 goals, and in the ruck as well as his usual defence position. He was rewarded with the Coach's Award for his willingness to fill any role in the team as needed, and also finished in the top five in the Malcolm Blight Medal for the club's best and fairest player. He also signed a new two-year deal with the Crows at the end of the season. After hyper-extending his left knee in a 2014 pre-season trial game, Otten missed the first nine games of the 2014 season, then played eleven consecutive games before tearing his right ACL in round 20 against the Brisbane Lions, the opposite knee compared to the one he had reconstructed in 2010. This ruled him out of the game for another 12 months.

Otten made his return in Adelaide's SANFL reserves side in July 2015. He played out the year there, often featuring in the side's best players. At the end of the season he signed another two-year contract keeping him at the club until 2017.

Otten returned to AFL football for the first time in 960 days in Round 1, 2017 against Greater Western Sydney. In the next match, when teammate Josh Jenkins was taken from the ground in the first quarter due to a rib injury, Otten had to take over his role as a part-time ruckman and a key forward, kicking one goal. His stint in the forward line was extended when teammate Mitch McGovern suffered a hamstring injury in the last quarter of the Round 3 Showdown. This enabled him to become a key player in the Crows side as a third tall forward, and he kicked a career-high four goals in the Crows' Round 10 match against Fremantle, where they won by 100 points.

His brother, Max, was rookie listed with Sydney in 2010, but did not play an AFL game.

== Coaching career ==
After Otten's playing career ended, he moved to the Box Hill Hawks and became an assistant coach for the Victorian Football League (VFL) side. He moved to the Collingwood Football Club in 2022, becoming an assistant and development coach in the club's VFL program. Ahead of the 2025 season, Otten was appointed head coach of Collingwood's VFL team, taking over from former Collingwood player Josh Fraser.

== Statistics ==
Statistics are correct to end of 2016 season

Legend
G	Goals	K	Kicks	D	Disposals	T	Tackles
B	Behinds	H	Handballs	M	Marks

Season	Team	No.	Games	Totals							Averages (per game)						
Season	Team	No.	Games	G	B	K	H	D	M	T	G	B	K	H	D	M	T
2008	Adelaide	22	2	0	2	7	6	13	4	3	0.0	1.0	3.5	3.0	6.5	2.0	1.5
2009	Adelaide	22	24	1	1	160	293	453	139	45	0.0	0.0	6.7	12.2	18.9	5.8	1.9
2011	Adelaide	22	15	2	2	115	152	267	74	46	0.1	0.1	7.7	10.1	17.8	4.9	3.1
2012	Adelaide	22	6	0	0	44	34	78	30	15	0.0	0.0	7.3	5.7	13.0	5.0	2.5
2013	Adelaide	22	22	15	4	166	147	313	102	50	0.7	0.2	7.6	6.7	14.2	4.6	2.3
2014	Adelaide	22	10	0	0	63	56	119	33	20	0.0	0.0	6.3	5.6	11.9	3.3	2.0
Career			79	18	9	555	688	1243	382	179	0.2	0.1	7.0	8.7	15.7	4.8	2.3
