= Rory Atkins =

Australian rules footballer

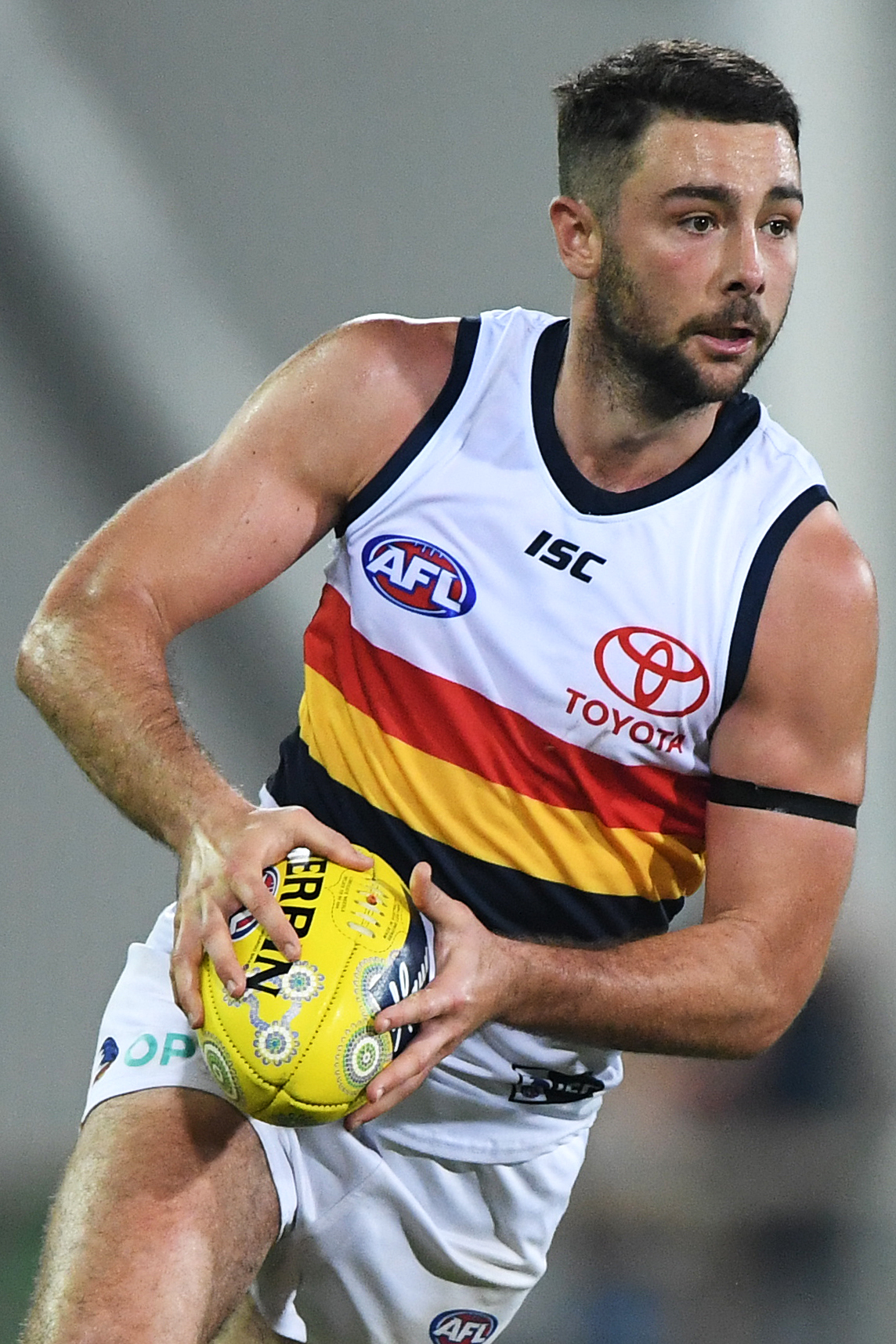
- Atkins in June 2019

Personal information
- Full name: Rory Atkins
- Nicknames: Rat, Kenny
- Born: 12 July 1994 (age 32)
- Original teams: Maribrynong Park; Calder Cannons (TAC Cup)
- Draft: No. 81, 2012 national draft
- Debut: Round 16, 2015, Adelaide vs. Port Adelaide, at Adelaide Oval
- Height: 186 cm (6 ft 1 in)
- Weight: 85 kg (187 lb)
- Position: Midfielder

Playing career
Years	Club	Games (Goals)
2013–2020	Adelaide	101 (47)
2021–2024	Gold Coast	37 (5)
2025	Port Adelaide	3 (0)
Total		141 (52)

Rory Atkins (born 12 July 1994) is a former professional Australian rules football player who played for Port Adelaide in the Australian Football League (AFL). He has previously played for Adelaide and for the Gold Coast.

== AFL career ==
=== Adelaide ===
Atkins played seven matches for SANFL club Sturt in 2013, and twelve matches for Sturt's reserves team. The following season, Adelaide's reserves team was introduced into the SANFL and Atkins played in their first ever game, kicking a classy goal in the second quarter of a 47-point loss to North Adelaide. Atkins performed impressively throughout the season, averaging 19 disposals and six marks per match, twice being named as an emergency for the Crows' senior AFL side, and finishing 6th in the reserves team's Club Champion award.

In February 2015, Atkins injured the posterior cruciate ligament in his right knee, resulting in him being sidelined for three months. He made a successful return to the SANFL with a career-best 32 disposals and 10 clearances in a 20-point loss to Central District. After continuing to show good form, Atkins was selected in the AFL team's 25-man squad for the match against Geelong, but the match was cancelled due to the death of coach Phil Walsh. After returning to the reserves team the next week, Atkins finally made his debut against Port Adelaide the week after. He went on to play eight AFL games in the latter part of the season, making an impact with his pace and left-foot kicking.

Atkins played his 100th AFL game in round 3, 2020, against Gold Coast at Metricon Stadium, but the milestone was not to be remembered as the Crows lost the match by 53 points. In October 2020, Atkins exercised his rights as a free agent and joined Gold Coast on a four-year deal.

=== Gold Coast ===
While struggling for selection at Gold Coast, Atkins was transformed into a rebounding defender under coaches Stuart Dew and Damien Hardwick. Following the departure of Dew as head coach, Atkins found good form, averaging 24.1 disposals in the last seven games of 2023.

In 2024, Rory Atkins prominently played in the VFL for Gold Coast's reserves. He finished second in the JJ Liston Trophy and was selected in the VFL Team of the Year. Despite being contracted until the end of 2025, Atkins was officially traded away from the Suns in the 2024 trade period as part of a three-way trade involving Dan Houston, John Noble, Jack Lukosius, and Joe Richards.

=== Port Adelaide ===
Atkins played three senior games for Port Adelaide, before retiring at the end of the 2025 season after one season at the club.

== Statistics ==
Legend
G	Goals	K	Kicks	D	Disposals	T	Tackles
B	Behinds	H	Handballs	M	Marks

Season	Team	No.	Games	Totals							Averages (per game)							Votes
Season	Team	No.	Games	G	B	K	H	D	M	T	G	B	K	H	D	M	T	Votes
2013	Adelaide	21	0	—	—	—	—	—	—	—	—	—	—	—	—	—	—	0
2014	Adelaide	21	0	—	—	—	—	—	—	—	—	—	—	—	—	—	—	0
2015	Adelaide	21	8	4	0	62	41	103	26	9	0.5	0.0	7.8	5.1	12.9	3.3	1.1	0
2016	Adelaide	21	24	11	12	262	230	492	103	39	0.5	0.5	10.9	9.6	20.5	4.3	1.6	1
2017	Adelaide	21	25	11	8	307	229	536	118	61	0.4	0.3	12.3	9.2	21.4	4.7	2.4	10
2018	Adelaide	21	20	13	8	264	140	404	98	46	0.7	0.4	13.2	7.0	20.2	4.9	2.3	3
2019	Adelaide	21	20	6	9	296	135	431	115	31	0.3	0.5	14.8	6.8	21.6	5.8	1.6	1
2020 (Note: The 2020 season was played with 17 home-and-away matches per team (down from 22) and 16-minute quarters with time on (down from 20-minute quarters with time on) due to the impact of the COVID-19 pandemic.)	Adelaide	21	4	2	0	20	17	37	4	8	0.5	0.0	5.0	4.3	9.3	1.0	2.0	0
2021	Gold Coast	2	8	2	2	47	41	88	16	9	0.3	0.3	5.9	5.1	11.0	2.0	1.1	0
2022	Gold Coast	2	9	0	0	58	31	89	15	8	0.0	0.0	6.4	3.4	9.9	1.7	0.9	0
2023	Gold Coast	2	17	3	3	241	104	345	87	19	0.2	0.2	14.2	6.1	20.3	5.1	1.1	0
2024	Gold Coast	2	3	0	1	23	14	37	9	1	0.0	0.3	7.7	4.7	12.3	3.0	0.3	0
2025	Port Adelaide	32	3	0	0	23	15	38	9	2	0.0	0.0	7.7	5.0	12.7	3.0	0.7	0
Career			141	52	43	1603	997	2600	600	233	0.4	0.3	11.4	7.1	18.4	4.3	1.7	15
