= Sam Shaw (footballer) =

Australian rules footballer

Personal information
- Full name: Sam Shaw
- Nickname: Shawry
- Born: 5 April 1991 (age 35)
- Original teams: Xavier College (APS); Oakleigh Chargers (TAC Cup)
- Draft: No. 45, 2009 national draft
- Debut: Round 4, 2012, Adelaide vs. Greater Western Sydney, at AAMI Stadium
- Height: 193 cm (6 ft 4 in)
- Weight: 90 kg (14 st 2 lb; 198 lb)
- Position: Key defender

Club information
- Current club: Adelaide
- Number: 34

Playing career^{1}
| Years | Club | Games (Goals) |
| 2012–2017 | Adelaide | 24 (0) |
- ^{1} Playing statistics correct to the end of 2016.

Career highlights
- 2012 AFL Rising Star nominee

Sam Shaw (born 5 April 1991) is a former professional Australian rules footballer who played for the Adelaide Football Club in the Australian Football League (AFL). He was recruited with pick 45 in the 2009 national draft from Xavier College and the Oakleigh Chargers.

== Playing career ==
Shaw's first two seasons in the AFL, 2010 and 2011, were ravaged by multiple injuries that prevented him from playing consecutive SANFL games until late in 2011. After a strong 2012 pre-season, Shaw finally made his AFL debut in round 4 against Greater Western Sydney, and impressed with 13 possessions, three marks and six rebound 50s. Despite further injuries including an unlucky eye injury mid-season and a hamstring injury in Adelaide's Semi Final win over Fremantle, Shaw established himself as a tall defender in tandem with Daniel Talia when fit, earning an AFL Rising Star nomination in round 21. During the season he signed a two-year contract extension with Adelaide.

Injuries continued to haunt Shaw over the next few seasons. In early 2013, he suffered a grade-two hamstring tear keeping him out of football for two months. He returned to play two more AFL games late in the year. Shaw then played in five of the first seven games in 2014 before again being struck down by hamstring issues, returning for one more game in round 21. At the end of the season he underwent major hamstring surgery to correct his chronic issues, requiring a six-month rehabilitation period that ruled him out of the start of the 2015 season. He made his return via the SANFL and played two more AFL games for Adelaide late in the season. In November 2016, he retired from AFL football citing ongoing concussion issues. He was, however, re-drafted by the Adelaide in the 2017 rookie draft in an administrative decision related to his ongoing welfare. In April 2019 he launched legal action against the Adelaide Football Club and its medical staff due to alleged mistreatment of the injury that ended his career.

== Coaching career ==
In 2019, he was the head coach of his high school alma mater, Xavier College. He was appointed later in 2019 as the backline assistant coach for the Richmond Football Club's senior women's side in the AFL Women's competition. As of August 2022, he is an assistant coach for the Collingwood AFLW side.

== AFL playing statistics ==
Statistics are correct to end of 2015 season

Legend
| G | Goals | K | Kicks | D | Disposals | T | Tackles |
| B | Behinds | H | Handballs | M | Marks |

| Season | Team | No. | Games | Totals | | | | | | | Averages (per game) | | | | | | |
| Season | Team | No. | Games | G | B | K | H | D | M | T | G | B | K | H | D | M | T |
|---|---|---|---|---|---|---|---|---|---|---|---|---|---|---|---|---|---|
| 2012 | Adelaide | 34 | 14 | 0 | 1 | 134 | 31 | 165 | 56 | 23 | 0.0 | 0.1 | 9.6 | 2.2 | 11.8 | 4.0 | 1.6 |
| 2013 | Adelaide | 34 | 2 | 0 | 0 | 15 | 6 | 21 | 7 | 5 | 0.0 | 0.0 | 7.5 | 3.0 | 10.5 | 3.5 | 2.5 |
| 2014 | Adelaide | 34 | 6 | 0 | 0 | 39 | 26 | 65 | 18 | 14 | 0.0 | 0.0 | 6.5 | 4.3 | 10.8 | 3.0 | 2.3 |
| 2015 | Adelaide | 34 | 2 | 0 | 0 | 12 | 9 | 21 | 7 | 2 | 0.0 | 0.0 | 6.0 | 4.5 | 10.5 | 3.5 | 1.0 |
| Career | | | 24 | 0 | 1 | 200 | 72 | 272 | 88 | 44 | 0.0 | 0.0 | 8.3 | 3.0 | 11.3 | 3.7 | 1.8 |
