= Riley Knight =

Australian rules footballer

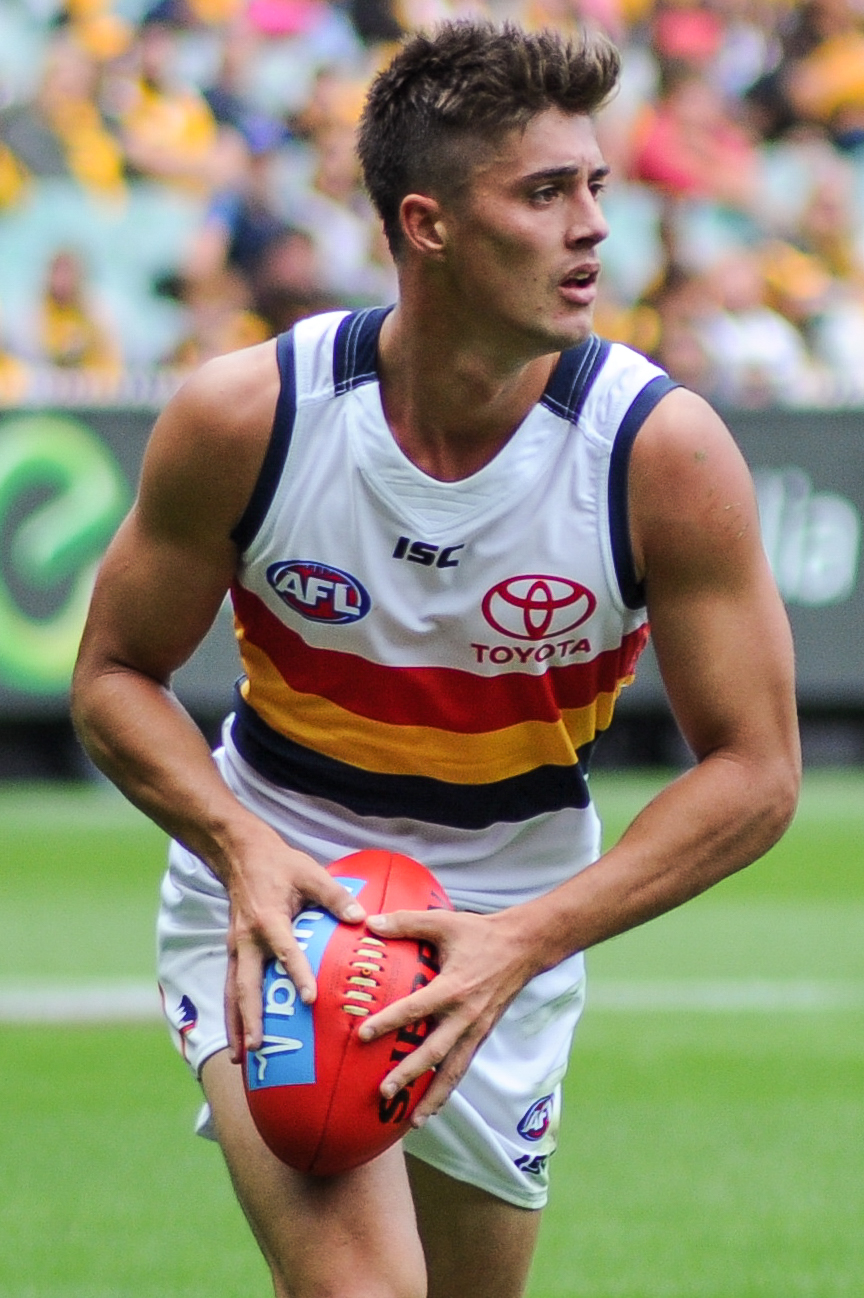
- Knight playing for Adelaide in April 2017

Personal information
- Full name: Riley Knight
- Nickname: Boogie
- Born: 27 March 1995 (age 31)
- Original teams: South Clare /Woodville-West Torrens (SANFL)
- Draft: No. 46, 2013 national draft
- Debut: Round 15, 2015, Adelaide vs. West Coast, at Patersons Stadium
- Height: 181 cm (5 ft 11 in)
- Weight: 77 kg (170 lb)
- Position: Small forward

Playing career^{1}
Years	Club	Games (Goals)
2014–2020	Adelaide	55 (37)
- ^{1} Playing statistics correct to the end of 2020.

Career highlights
- SANFL premiership player: 2021

Riley Knight (born 27 March 1995) is a former professional Australian rules football player who played for the Adelaide Football Club in the Australian Football League (AFL). Knight was drafted with pick 46 of the 2013 National Draft.

== AFL career ==
Knight did not play in 2014, but played all 18 games for Adelaide's SANFL team. He impressed in the 2015 pre-season and was tipped to debut in the first round before an ankle injury sidelined him for three months. On returning he showed strong form in the SANFL and was rewarded with a call up to the side to play against Geelong, but the match was cancelled due to the death of coach Phil Walsh. He made his debut the next week, against West Coast, and kicked two goals from 13 disposals. Knight held his place in the side for the rest of the season, starring in Adelaide's elimination final win over the Western Bulldogs with two goals from 15 disposals.

Knight played just one game in 2016, against Richmond in round 3, missing most of the season through an ankle injury before playing the last six games for Adelaide's SANFL side. He signaled his intentions to break into a regular role in the side in 2017, winning the club's 2 km time trial in November.

Knight returned to the AFL side in Round 1 of 2017 when Crows' captain Taylor Walker was injured and Knight replaced him in the team, scoring 2 goals. In the Showdown against Port Adelaide in Round 3, received a punch to the jaw from Port Adelaide ruckman Paddy Ryder in the final quarter of the match and had to finish the game on the interchange bench, but he was not injured by the incident and returned to training that week. He was struck again the next week by Essendon player Conor McKenna. In Round 5, Knight, along with fellow Adelaide player Daniel Talia, suffered a hamstring injury, the eighth of the year for the Crows. In Round 16 he was given the job of tagging Western Bulldogs player and 2016 Norm Smith Medallist Jason Johannisen. He kept Johannisen to 16 disposals and the Crows won by 59 points. At the end of the season he played in the 2017 AFL Grand Final as part of the Crows' losing team. Knight was delisted at the conclusion of the 2020 AFL season.

== Statistics ==
Statistics are correct to end of the 2017 season.

Legend
G	Goals	K	Kicks	D	Disposals	T	Tackles
B	Behinds	H	Handballs	M	Marks

Season	Team	No.	Games	Totals							Averages (per game)						
Season	Team	No.	Games	G	B	K	H	D	M	T	G	B	K	H	D	M	T
2015	Adelaide	39	11	8	5	62	74	136	36	26	0.7	0.5	5.6	6.7	12.4	3.3	2.4
2016	Adelaide	3	1	0	0	2	8	10	2	1	0.0	0.0	2.0	8.0	10.0	2.0	1.0
2017	Adelaide	3	19	13	7	123	156	279	76	76	0.7	0.4	6.5	8.2	14.7	4.0	4.0
Career			31	21	12	187	238	425	114	103	0.7	0.4	6.0	7.7	13.7	3.7	3.3
