= Josh Jenkins =

Australian rules footballer (born 1989)

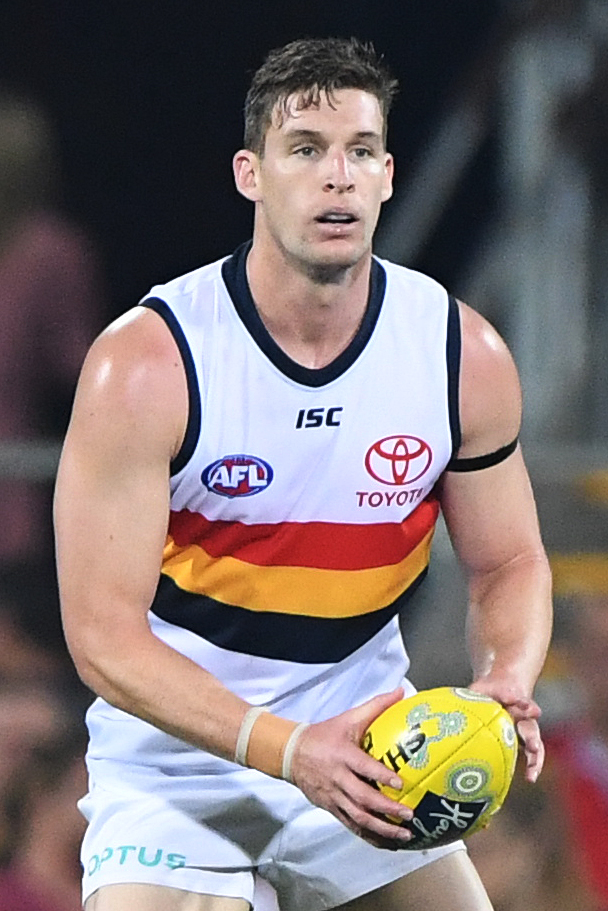
- Jenkins playing for Adelaide in 2019

Personal information
- Full name: Joshua Jenkins
- Nicknames: JJ, Jenko
- Born: 8 February 1989 (age 37); Swan Hill, Victoria
- Original team: Tyntynder (CMFL)
- Draft: No. 12, 2010 rookie draft
- Debut: Round 7, 2012, Adelaide vs. Geelong, at AAMI Stadium
- Height: 200 cm (6 ft 7 in)
- Weight: 108 kg (238 lb)
- Position: Key forward / ruckman

Playing career^{1}
Years	Club	Games (Goals)
2011	Essendon	0 (0)
2012–2019	Adelaide	147 (296)
2020–2021	Geelong	2 (0)
Total		149 (296)
- ^{1} Playing statistics correct to the end of 2021.

Career highlights
- Adelaide leading goalkicker: 2018

Joshua Jenkins (born 8 February 1989) is a former professional Australian rules footballer. He last played for the Geelong Football Club in the Australian Football League (AFL). He previously played for the Adelaide Football Club from 2012 to 2019 and was on the Essendon Football Club's list in 2011 without playing a senior game.

== Basketball career ==
As a junior Jenkins mainly played basketball and was a development player with the Townsville Crocodiles in the Australian National Basketball League. He had previously played with the Townsville Heat and Mackay Meteors in the QABL, a second-tier league within Australia. As a shooting guard, he attended Townsville State High School and led the team to 7th place at the State titles. In 2007 he toured the United States with the Australian junior team.

== AFL career ==
=== Essendon (2011) ===
In 2010 he was invited to attend a training camp for the Australian rules football expansion team, Greater Western Sydney, after switching away from basketball to play football in Lake Boga, Victoria. At the end of the year, he was drafted by Essendon with pick 12 in the 2010 Rookie Draft.

Jenkins spent the 2011 season playing for Essendon's VFL affiliate, the Bendigo Bombers, but was highly sought after in the 2011 trading period. Despite initially seeking a trade to another Victorian club, Jenkins was traded to Adelaide along with national draft pick 41, in exchange for pick 31.

=== Adelaide (2012–2019) ===
Jenkins made his AFL debut in round 7, 2012, against Geelong at AAMI Stadium, and kicked a goal with his first kick. He played 11 matches in his first year and kicked 11 goals. In 2013 Jenkins switched his guernsey number from number 20 to 4, vacated by Kurt Tippett after his controversial departure from the club, and was dubbed as Tippett's replacement in the key forward position. Provided extra responsibility by Tippett's loss and Taylor Walker's injury, Jenkins kicked 24 goals in 17 games in 2013 before a fractured ankle ended his season. He finished third in the club's goalkicking that year.

Jenkins signed a new two-year contract with Adelaide in May 2014. He proceeded to have his best season to date, kicking 40 goals in 20 games, including five against Hawthorn in round 17. He improved even further in 2015, kicking 46 goals and taking more contested marks than any other Adelaide player.

In round 7, 2016, Jenkins kicked a career-high eight goals in the Crows' 15-point loss to the Western Bulldogs at Etihad Stadium. He went on to kick 62 goals in the season, a career high, and was named in the All-Australian squad of 40. It was reported during the season that rival club Brisbane Lions had offered Jenkins a five-year deal worth $750,000 per season; however, he ultimately rejected other offers to sign a five-year contract extension with Adelaide in July.

In round 2, 2017, Jenkins suffered bruised ribs after a collision with Hawthorn player Teia Miles only 10 minutes into the game. He was unable to play the rest of the game, and though he was expected to return the next week, he was eventually ruled out due to his injury being more serious than originally thought. He returned to the side after his injury, but in round 9 he was dropped to the SANFL due to poor form. He returned to the senior side immediately in round 10 against Fremantle, and kicked three goals. His form improved and he continued to add more facets to his game, managing 12 tackles in a hard-fought contest against Carlton in Round 15. Against the Western Bulldogs in round 16, Jenkins kicked four goals and took 11 marks, helping to dominate along with captain Taylor Walker. At the end of the season he played in the 2017 AFL Grand Final as part of the Crows' losing team.

=== Geelong (2020–2021) ===
He was traded to Geelong at the conclusion of the 2019 AFL season after requesting to leave Adelaide.

Jenkins retired at the end of the 2021 AFL season after only managing to play two games in two years at Geelong.

== Statistics ==
Statistics are correct to end of the 2021 season

Legend
G	Goals	K	Kicks	D	Disposals	T	Tackles
B	Behinds	H	Handballs	M	Marks	H/O	Hit-outs

Season	Team	No.	Games	Totals								Averages (per game)								Votes
Season	Team	No.	Games	G	B	K	H	D	M	T	H/O	G	B	K	H	D	M	T	H/O	Votes
2011	Essendon	46	0	–	–	–	–	–	–	–	–	–	–	–	–	–	–	–	–	–
2012	Adelaide	20	11	11	3	74	43	117	50	24	61	1.0	0.3	6.7	3.9	10.6	4.5	2.2	5.5	0
2013	Adelaide	4	17	24	24	142	59	201	78	29	61	1.4	1.4	8.4	3.5	11.8	4.6	1.7	3.6	0
2014	Adelaide	4	20	40	26	170	64	234	86	27	55	2.0	1.3	8.5	3.2	11.7	4.3	1.4	2.8	3
2015	Adelaide	4	21	46	21	173	68	241	108	28	79	2.2	1.0	8.2	3.2	11.5	5.1	1.3	3.8	3
2016	Adelaide	4	24	62	29	195	95	290	122	46	135	2.6	1.2	8.1	4.0	12.1	5.1	1.9	5.6	8
2017	Adelaide	4	21	45	22	189	88	277	110	52	109	2.1	1.1	9.0	4.2	13.2	5.2	2.5	5.2	2
2018	Adelaide	4	22	46	27	200	83	283	111	61	97	2.1	1.2	9.1	3.8	12.9	5.0	2.8	4.4	3
2019	Adelaide	4	11	22	17	100	36	136	56	18	68	2.0	1.5	9.1	3.3	12.4	5.1	1.6	6.2	0
2020 (Note: The 2020 season was played with 17 home-and-away matches per team (down from 22) and 16-minute quarters with time on (down from 20-minute quarters with time on) due to the impact of the COVID-19 pandemic.)	Geelong	11	1	0	0	8	6	14	3	4	7	0.0	0.0	8.0	6.0	14.0	3.0	4.0	7.0	0
2021	Geelong	11	1	0	2	5	3	8	2	2	3	0.0	2.0	5.0	3.0	8.0	2.0	2.0	3.0	0
Career			149	296	171	1256	545	1801	726	291	675	2.0	1.1	8.4	3.7	12.1	4.9	2.0	4.5	19
