= Australian rules football records at the Adelaide Oval =

The records included in this article cover senior Australian rules football at Adelaide Oval, located in Adelaide, South Australia, for both men and women. The records include the South Australian league football (first known as the South Australian Football Association, then South Australian Football League, and later South Australian National Football League) from 1877, when the first premiership matches were held at the ground, until the end of the 1990 SANFL season, the last year that the competition was the highest level of Australian rules football in South Australia.

== History ==
The first senior league Australian rules football match was played on Adelaide Oval in 1877 between the original Adelaide club and the Bankers club.

In 1991 the newly created Adelaide Crows entered the Australian Football League, subsequently playing the highest level of football in the state. Port Adelaide joined the Australian Football League in 1997.

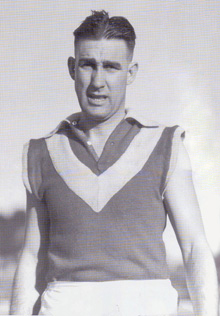
Ken Farmer
(North Adelaide) Most goals outright (347) and equal most goals alongside Neil Hawke (Port Adelaide) in a single match (15).

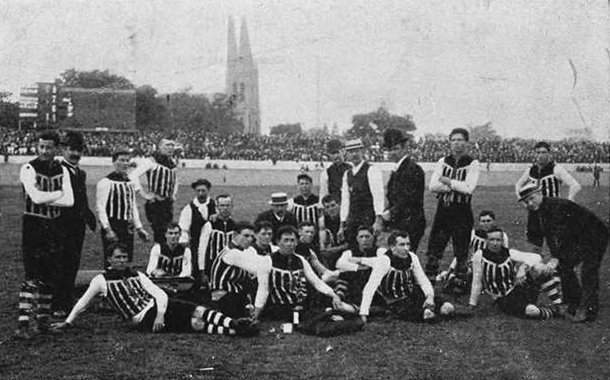
Port Adelaide
The Port Adelaide Football Club won 20 Grand Finals and four Championship of Australia titles at Adelaide Oval.

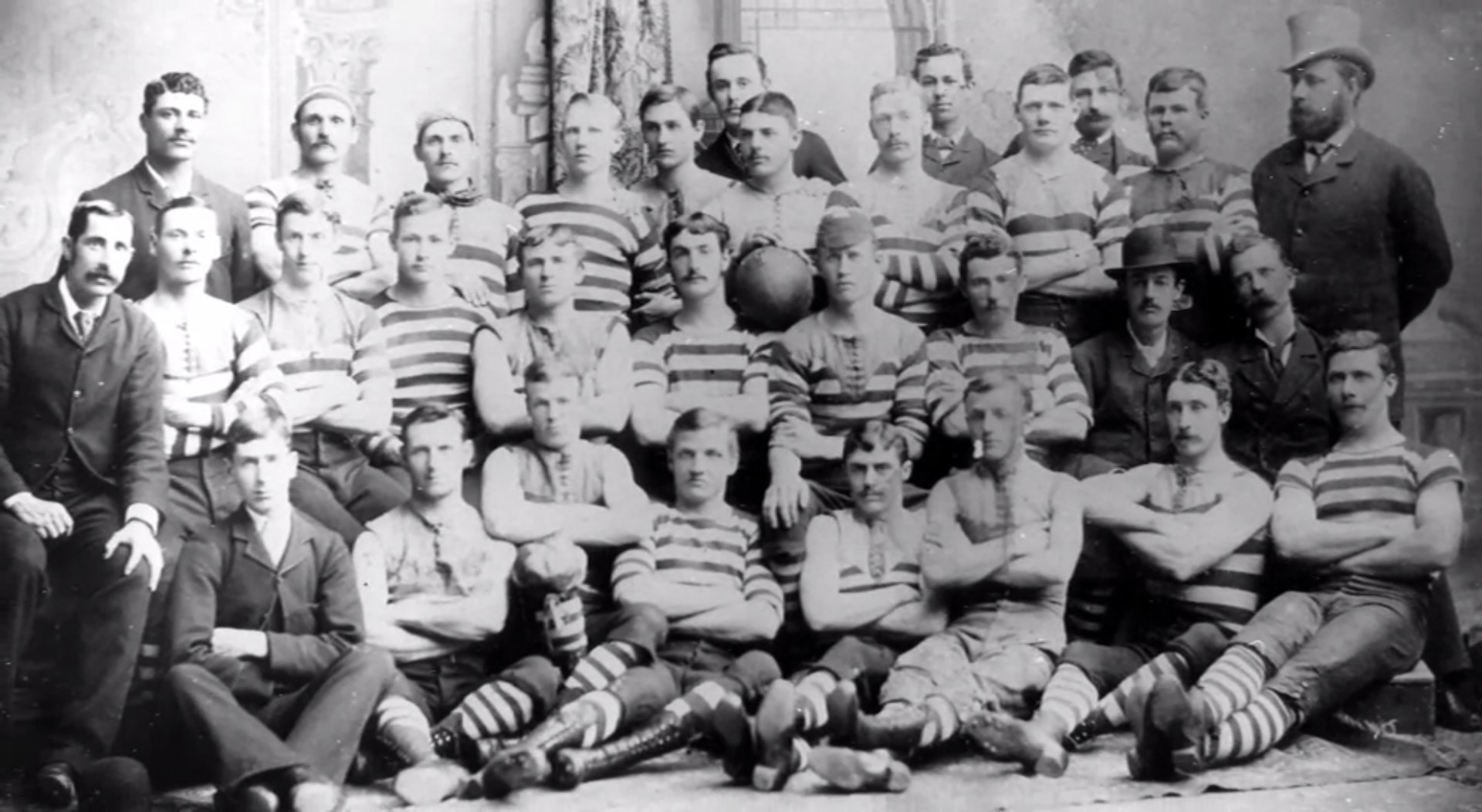
South Adelaide
The South Adelaide Football Club used Adelaide Oval as its home ground for over 100 years between 1882 and 1903 and 1905–1994.

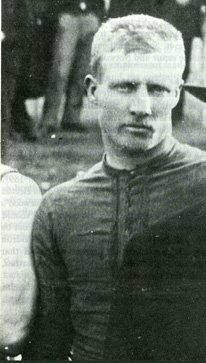
Alfred Waldron
(Norwood) Alfred Waldron was captain of Norwood for the 1889 SAFA Grand Final, the first Grand Final in a major Australian rules football competition.

=== Individual (Men) ===
==== Most goals in a game by a player ====
Australian Football League (1991–present)
Goals	Player	Club	Year
10	Taylor Walker	Adelaide	2023
9	Joel Amartey	Sydney	2024
8	Jay Schulz	Port Adelaide	2014
7	Jay Schulz	Port Adelaide	2014
7	Taylor Walker	Adelaide	2015
7	Josh Kennedy	West Coast	2016
7	Josh Jenkins	Adelaide	2016
7	Taylor Walker	Adelaide	2023
Last update from 2024, round 14.

South Australian league football (1877–1990)
Goals	Player	Club	Year
15	Ken Farmer	North Adelaide	1936
15	Neil Hawke	Port Adelaide	1957
14	Bruce Schultz	Norwood	1940
14	Bruce Schultz	Norwood	1941
13	Ken Farmer	North Adelaide	1934
Final SANFL standings as of 1990, round 20.

==== Most career goals by a player ====
Australian Football League (1991–present)
Goals	Player	Club	Games
252	Taylor Walker	Adelaide	109
174	Eddie Betts	Adelaide; Carlton	73
153	Charlie Dixon	Port Adelaide; Gold Coast	84
139	Josh Jenkins	Adelaide; Geelong	65
133	Robbie Gray	Port Adelaide	94
Last updated round 6, 2024.

South Australian league football (1877–1990)
Goals	Player	Club	Games
347	Ken Farmer	North Adelaide	54
~292	Bos Daly	Norwood	~107
Final SANFL standings as of 1990, round 20.

==== Most career games by a player ====
Australian Football League (1991–present)
Games	Player	Club	Years
120	Travis Boak	Port Adelaide	2011–
115	Rory Laird	Adelaide	2014–
115	Ollie Wines	Port Adelaide	2014–
109	Taylor Walker	Adelaide	2014–
107	Brodie Smith	Adelaide	2011–
Last updated round 6, 2024.

South Australian league football (1877–1990)
Games	Player	Club	Years
~144	Stuart Palmer	South Adelaide	1969–85
Final SANFL standings as of 1990, round 20.

=== Team (men) ===
==== Most consecutive wins by a club at the ground ====
Australian Football League (1991–present)
Streak	Club	Span
10	Collingwood	2018–2025
10	Adelaide	2025–
8	Port Adelaide	2011–14
8	Adelaide	2015–16
7	Adelaide	2016
6	Port Adelaide	2020
6	Port Adelaide	2023
Last update from 2025, round 24.

South Australian league football (1877–1990)
Streak	Club	Span
18	Port Adelaide	1956–59
14	Port Adelaide	1913–15
11	North Adelaide	1905–06
11	Sturt	1968–70
11	Glenelg	1973–75
Final SANFL standings as of 1990, round 20.

==== Highest team score ====
Australian Football League (1991–present)
Score	Club	Year
27.15 (177) vs Brisbane Lions	Adelaide	2016
27.12 (174) vs West Coast	Adelaide	2023
24.15 (159) vs Brisbane Lions	Port Adelaide	2014
24.9 (153) vs Essendon	Adelaide	2017
23.14 (152) vs Port Adelaide	Brisbane Lions	2024
Last update from 2024, round 15.

South Australian league football (1877–1990)
Score	Club	Year
34.22 (226) vs South Adelaide	North Adelaide	1972
34.18 (222) vs South Adelaide	Port Adelaide	1990
33.23 (221) vs South Adelaide	West Adelaide	1959
34.15 (219) vs South Adelaide	West Torrens	1950
34.12 (216) vs South Adelaide	Central District	1973
Final SANFL standings as of 1990, round 20.

==== Largest single-quarter score ====
Australian Football League (1991–present)
Score	Club	Year
Q4 – 9.3 (57) vs. Carlton	Port Adelaide	2021
Q1 – 9.3 (57) vs. Hawthorn	Port Adelaide	2023
Q1 – 9.2 (56) vs. Essendon	Adelaide	2017
Q3 – 9.2 (56) vs. Gold Coast	Port Adelaide	2023
Q3 – 8.5 (53) vs. GWS Giants	Adelaide	2017
Last update from 2023, round 17.

South Australian league football (1877–1990)
Score	Club	Year
Q4 – 14.10 (94) vs. North Adelaide	West Adelaide	1940
Q4 – 14.3 (87) vs. Sturt	Port Adelaide	1990
Q2 – 13.6 (84) vs. South Adelaide	Port Adelaide	1974
Q3 – 13.5 (83) vs. West Torrens	Central District	1981
Q2 – 13.3 (81) vs. Central District	South Adelaide	1969
Final SANFL standings as of 1990, round 20.

==== Largest winning margin ====
Australian Football League (1991–present)
Margin	Club	Opponent	Year
138	Adelaide	Brisbane Lions	2016
122	Adelaide	West Coast	2023
115	Port Adelaide	Gold Coast	2017
113	Port Adelaide	Brisbane Lions	2014
103	Port Adelaide	Carlton	2014
Last updated 2024

South Australian league football (1877–1990)
Margin	Club	Opponent	Year
180*	Norwood	Adelaide	1893
178	North Adelaide	South Adelaide	1972
175	West Adelaide	South Adelaide	1959
162*	South Adelaide	Adelaide	1892
153	Port Adelaide	South Adelaide	1957
Final SANFL standings as of 1990, round 20.

- Before 1897 behinds were not included in the final score. During these matches the margins were 30 and 27 goals.

==== Lowest team score ====
Australian Football League (1991–present)
Score	Club	Opponent	Year
3.2 (20)	Gold Coast	Port Adelaide	2017
2.14 (26)	Western Bulldogs	Adelaide	2018
3.11 (29)	GWS Giants	Port Adelaide	2022
4.5 (29)	Essendon	Port Adelaide	2020
4.9 (33)	Adelaide	Richmond	2020
4.9 (33)	West Coast	Port Adelaide	2022
Last update from 2022, round 18.

South Australian league football (1877–1990)
Score	Club	Opponent	Year
0.0 (0)	West Adelaide	North Adelaide	1897
0.1 (1)	West Adelaide	South Adelaide	1898
0.5 (5)	West Adelaide	Sturt	1901
0.8 (8)	West Torrens	South Adelaide	1913
0.8 (8)	West Torrens	West Adelaide	1901

=== Individual (women) ===
==== Most goals in a game ====
Australian Football League Women (2019–present)
Goals	Player	Club	Year
3	Chelsea Randall	Adelaide	S7 (2022)
3	Danielle Ponter	Adelaide	2019
3	Danielle Ponter	Adelaide	2019
2	Ashleigh Woodland	Adelaide	2022
2	Danielle Ponter	Adelaide	2022
2	Erin Phillips	Adelaide	2019
2	Erin Phillips	Adelaide	2019
2	Ebony Marinoff	Adelaide	2019
2	Chloe Scheer	Adelaide	2019
2	Courtney Hodder	Brisbane Lions	2021
2	Jess Wuetschner	Brisbane Lions	2021
Last update from 2022 (S7)

==== Most goals in a career ====
Australian Football League Women (2019–present)
Goals	Player	Club	Year
8	Danielle Ponter	Adelaide	2019–2022
5	Erin Phillips	Adelaide	2019–2022
3	Chloe Scheer	Adelaide	2019–2022
2	Ebony Marinoff	Adelaide	2019–2022
2	Courtney Hodder	Brisbane Lions	2021–2021
2	Jess Wuetschner	Brisbane Lions	2021–2021
2	Stevie-Lee Thompson	Adelaide	2019–2022
Last update 2022 AFLW Preliminary Final.

=== Team (women) ===
==== Highest team score ====
Australian Football League Women (2019–present)
Score	Club	Year
11.7 (73) vs Geelong	Adelaide	2019
10.3 (63) vs Carlton	Adelaide	2019
8.15 (63) vs Port Adelaide	Adelaide	S7 (2022)
6.4 (40) vs Fremantle	Adelaide	2022
6.2 (38) vs Adelaide	Brisbane Lions	2021
