= List of Adelaide Football Club leading goalkickers =

The following list details all of the major goalkicking records relating specifically to Adelaide, including each season highs, career highs, and game highs for both the Australian Football League (formerly the Victorian Football League) and AFL Women's. Since the inclusion of Adelaide into the AFL, Tony Modra is the only Adelaide player to win the Coleman Medal, which he achieved in 1997 with 81 goals for the home-and-away season.

== Adelaide leading goalkickers ==
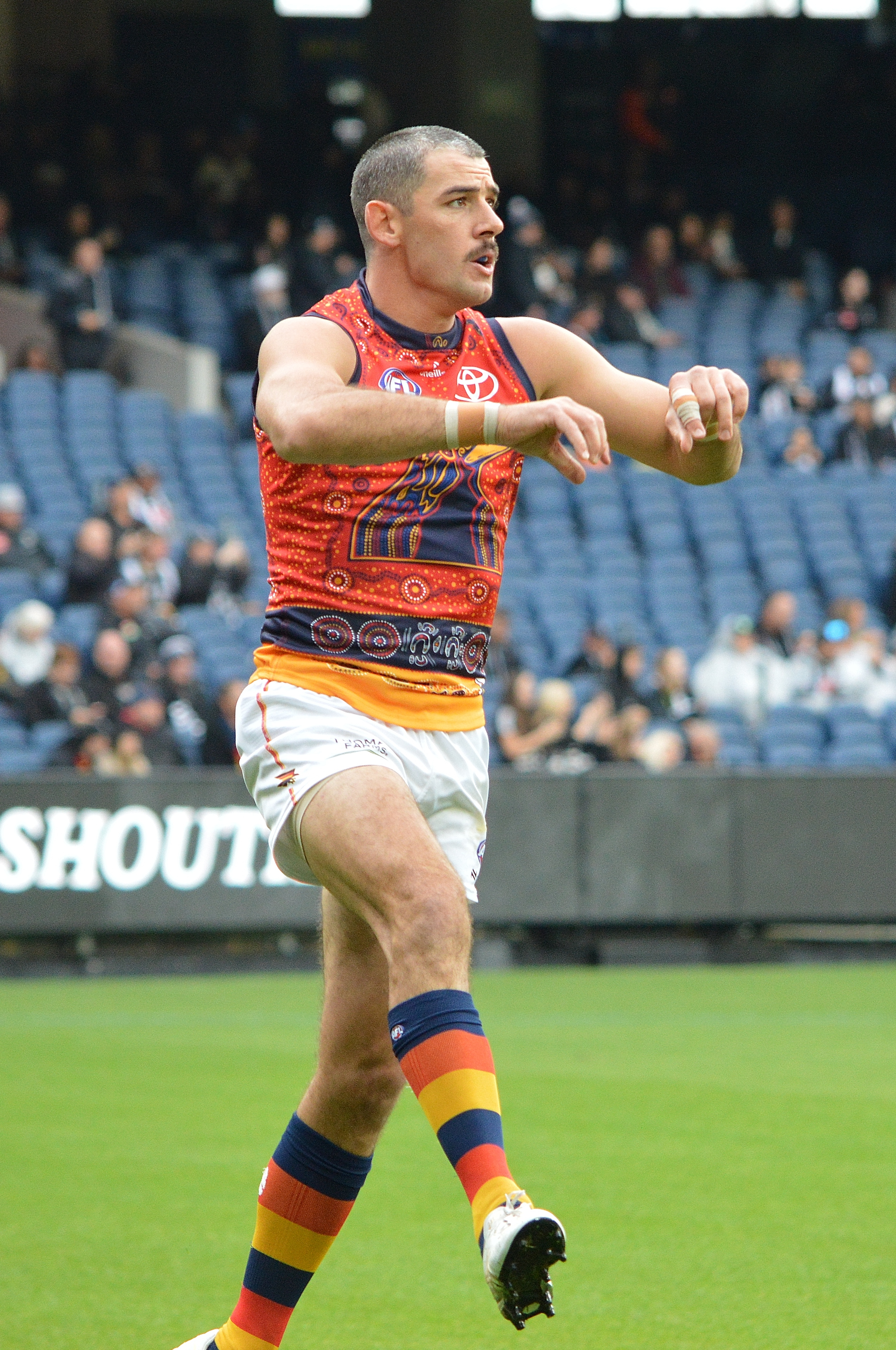
Taylor "Tex" Walker is a seven-time leading goalkicker for Adelaide, more than any other Adelaide player. He also holds the club record for career goals.

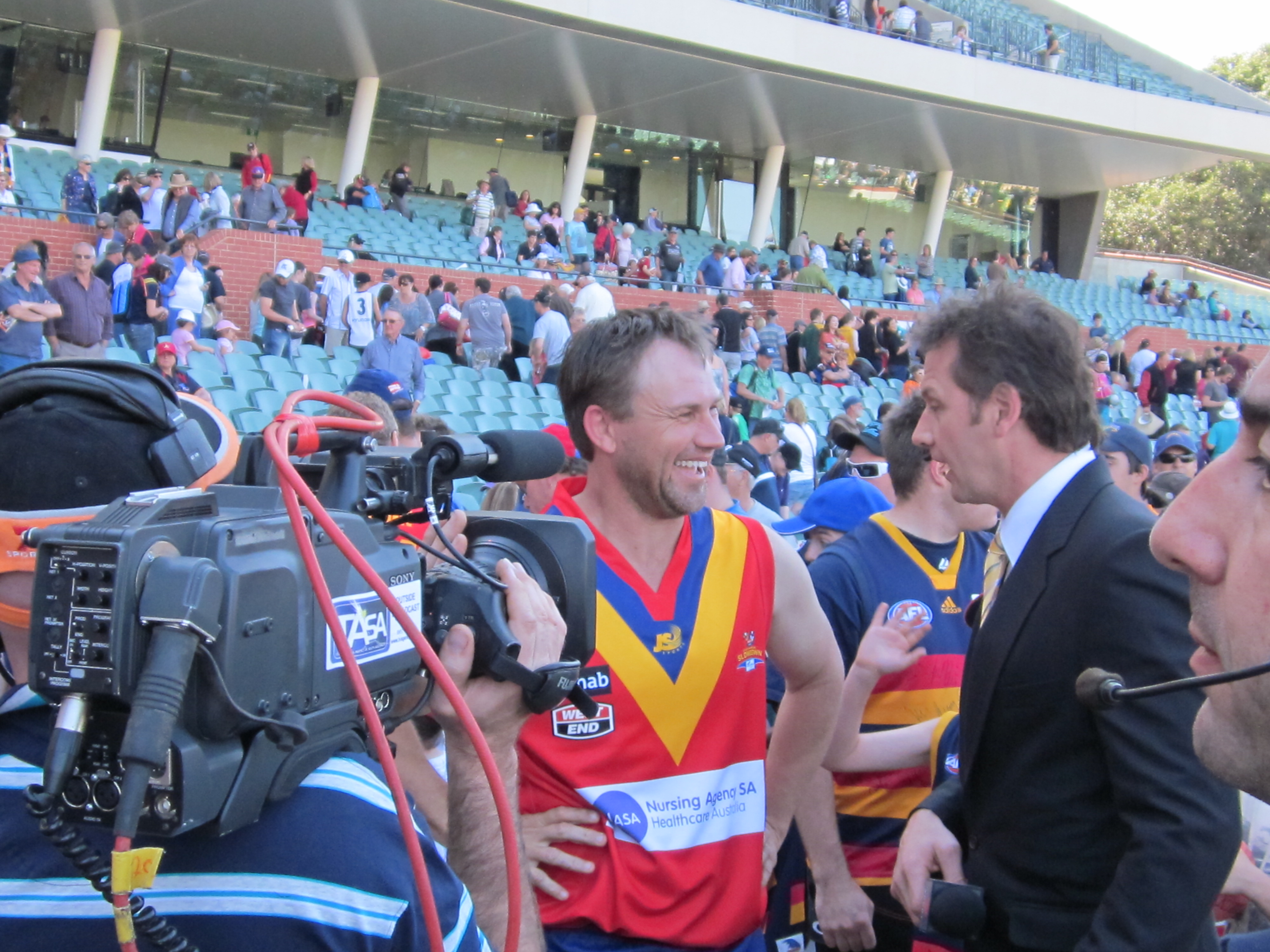
Tony Modra (centre of image) is a five-time leading goalkicker at Adelaide and a cult figure notable for his spectacular marks. He kicked a 13-goal haul on two occasions, two clear of any other Adelaide player as of 2023.

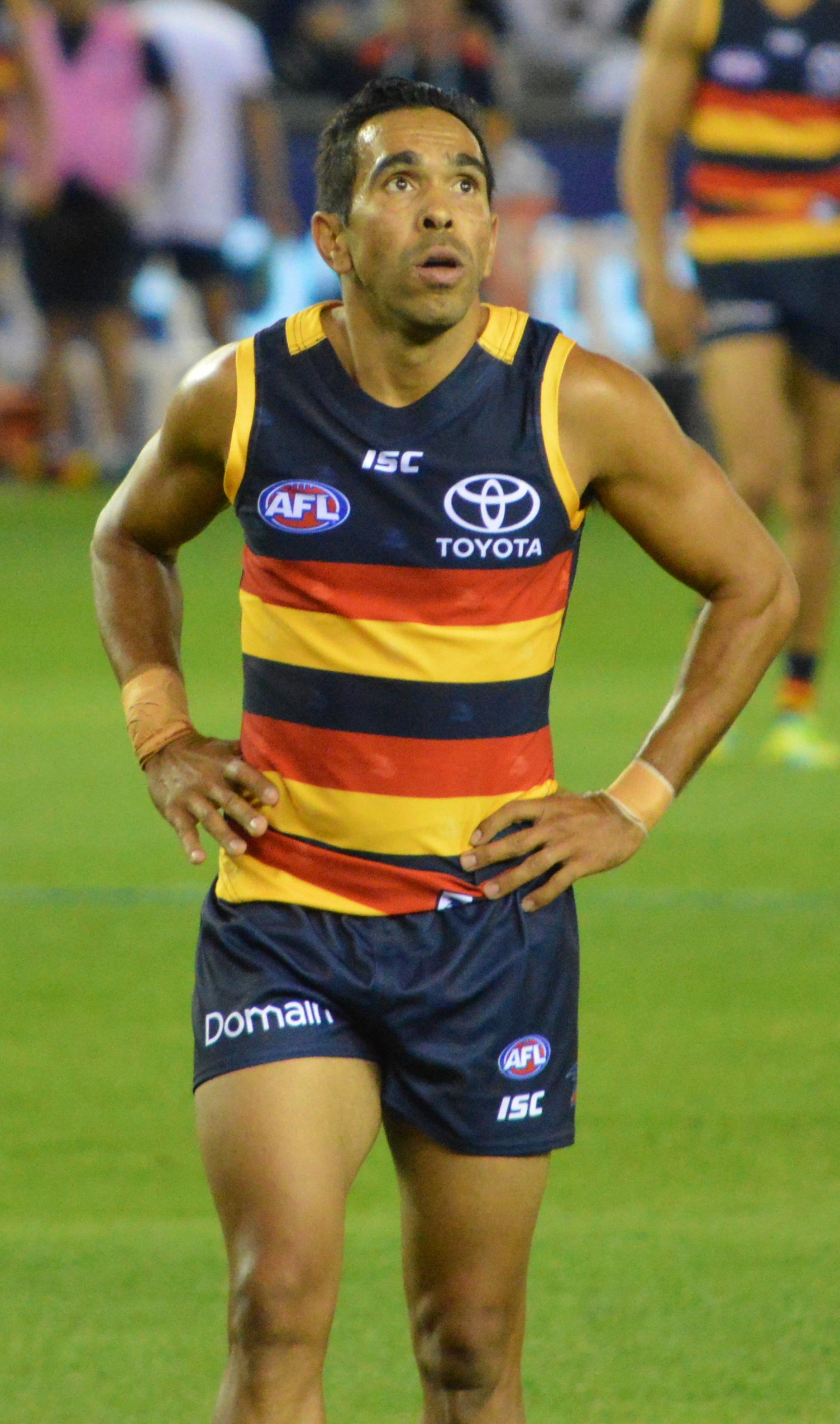
Eddie Betts was the second Crow to lead the goalkicking four years in a row, preceded by Modra and succeeded by Walker.

^	Denotes current player
+	Player won Coleman Medal in same season
†	Team played finals (which count for the tally)

Season	Leading goalkicker	Goals
1991	Rod Jameson	49
1992	Scott Hodges	48
1993	Tony Modra	129†
1994	Tony Modra (2)	70
1995	Tony Modra (3)	42
1996	Tony Modra (4)	75
1997	Tony Modra+ (5)	84†
1998	Darren Jarman	45†
1999	Darren Jarman (2)	58
2000	Scott Welsh	47
2001	Darren Jarman (3)	40†
2002	Brett Burton	51†
2003	Graham Johncock	30†
2004	Scott Welsh (2)	36
2005	Scott Welsh (3)	58†
2006	Mark Ricciuto	44†
2007	Scott Welsh (4)	49†
2008	Brett Burton (2)	34†
2009	Jason Porplyzia	57†
2010	Kurt Tippett	46
2011	Taylor Walker	32
2012	Taylor Walker (2)	63†
2013	Tom Lynch	33
2014	Eddie Betts	51
2015	Eddie Betts (2)	63†
2016	Eddie Betts (3)	75†
2017	Eddie Betts (4)	55†
2018	Josh Jenkins	46
2019	Taylor Walker (3)	43
2020	Taylor Walker (4)	15
2021	Taylor Walker (5)	48
2022	Taylor Walker (6)	47
2023	Taylor Walker (7)	76
2024	Darcy Fogarty^	41
2025	Riley Thilthorpe^	60†
2026	Josh Rachele^	42†

=== Multiple winners ===
Player	Wins	Seasons
Taylor Walker	7	2011, 2012, 2019, 2020, 2021, 2022, 2023
Tony Modra	5	1993, 1994, 1995, 1996, 1997
Eddie Betts	4	2014, 2015, 2016, 2017
Scott Welsh	4	2000, 2004, 2005, 2007
Darren Jarman	3	1998, 1999, 2001
Brett Burton	2	2002, 2008

=== Leading career goalkickers for Adelaide ===
Player	Adelaide goals	Average
Taylor Walker	715	2.24
Tony Modra	440 (588 AFL total)	3.73
Eddie Betts	310 (640 AFL total)	2.35
Josh Jenkins	296	2.01
Mark Ricciuto	292	0.94
Andrew McLeod	275	0.81
Scott Welsh	270 (363 AFL total)	2.09
Darren Jarman	264 (597 AFL total)	2.18
Brett Burton	264	1.49

=== Most goals in a game ===
Goals	Player	Opponent	Round	Year	Venue
13.4	Tony Modra	Richmond	16	1993	Football Park
13.3	Tony Modra	Carlton	1	1994	Football Park
11.4	Scott Hodges	Geelong	23	1992	Football Park
10.3	Tony Modra	Richmond	1	1993	MCG
10.2	Taylor Walker	West Coast Eagles	13	2023	Adelaide Oval
10.2	Tom Lynch	Greater Western Sydney	7	2013	Sydney Showground Stadium
10.1	Tony Modra	North Melbourne	8	1993	Football Park
9.4	Taylor Walker	West Coast Eagles	24	2023	Perth Stadium
9.0	Darren Jarman	Melbourne	13	1999	MCG

== AFL Women's leading goalkickers ==
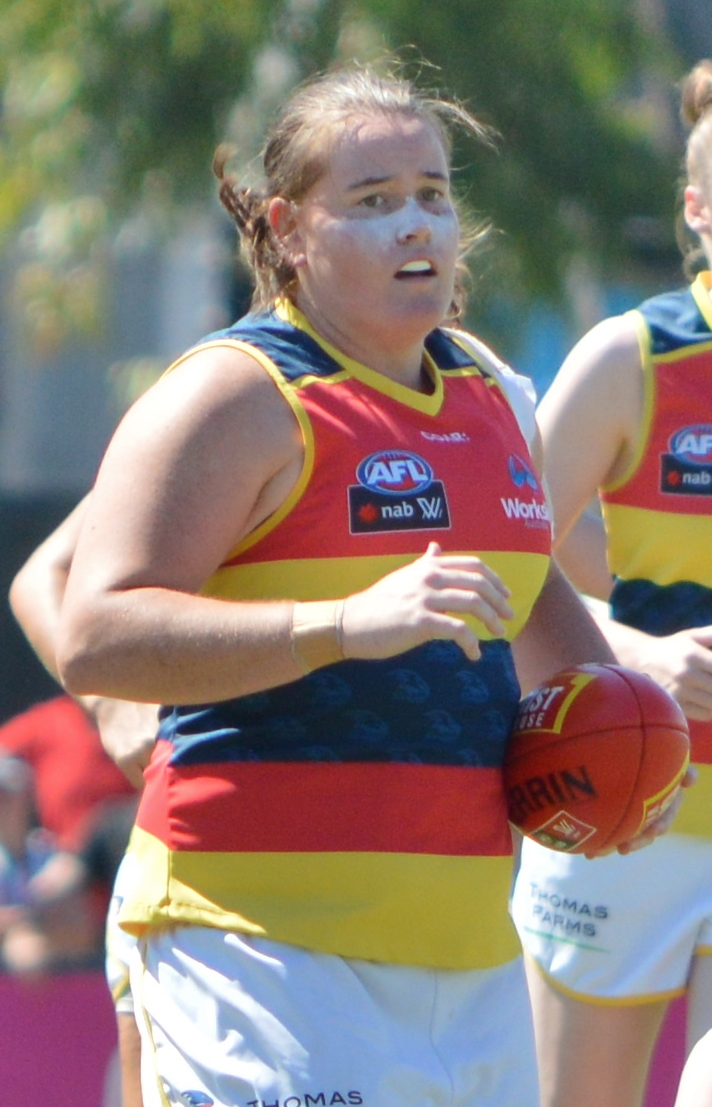
Sarah Perkins was Adelaide's inaugural leading goalkicker.

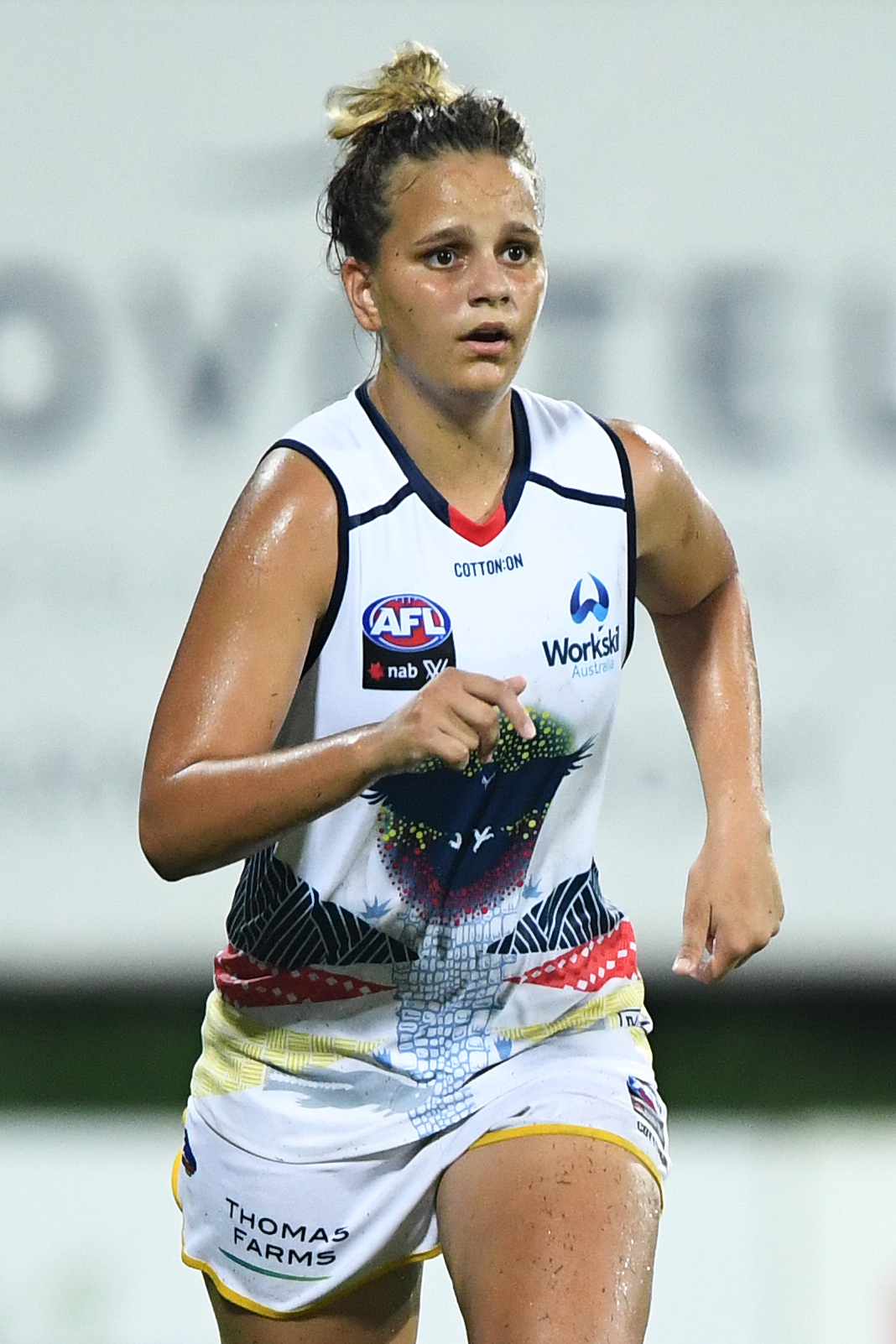
Danielle Ponter was Adelaide's leading goalkicker in 2020 and 2023.

Season	Leading goalkicker	Goals
2017	Sarah Perkins	11†
2018	Erin Phillips	7
2018	Ruth Wallace	7
2019	Stevie-Lee Thompson+	14†
2020	Danielle Ponter^	5
2021	Erin Phillips (2)	14†
2022 ^{(S6)}	Ashleigh Woodland+	21†
2022 ^{(S7)}	Ashleigh Woodland (2)	14†
2023	Danielle Ponter^ (2)	20†
2024	Caitlin Gould^	20†
2025	Eloise Jones^	15†
2026	Caitlin Gould^ (2)	10

=== Multiple winners ===
Player	Wins	Seasons
Erin Phillips	2	2018, 2021
Ashleigh Woodland	2	2022 ^{(S6)}, 2022 ^{(S7)}
Danielle Ponter^	2	2020, 2023
Caitlin Gould^	2	2024, 2026

=== Leading career goalkickers for Adelaide ===
Player	Adelaide goals	Average
Danielle Ponter^	91	1.07
Caitlin Gould^	74	0.90
Eloise Jones^	62	0.66
Erin Phillips	50 (53 AFLW total)	1.10
Ashleigh Woodland	44 (77 AFLW total)	1.22

=== Most goals in a game ===
Goals	Player	Opponent	Round	Year	Venue
5.2	Danielle Ponter^	Hawthorn	3	2024	Unley Oval
4.3	Danielle Ponter^	Gold Coast	6	2021	Norwood Oval
4.3	Sarah Perkins	Collingwood	7	2017	Olympic Park Oval
4.2	Erin Phillips	Western Bulldogs	3	2018	Norwood Oval
4.0	Stevie-Lee Thompson	Carlton	2	2019	Princes Park

== See also ==
- List of Adelaide Football Club records and statistics
- VFL/AFL goalkicking records
- Adelaide Honour Roll
