= Darcy Fogarty =

Australian rules footballer (born 1999)

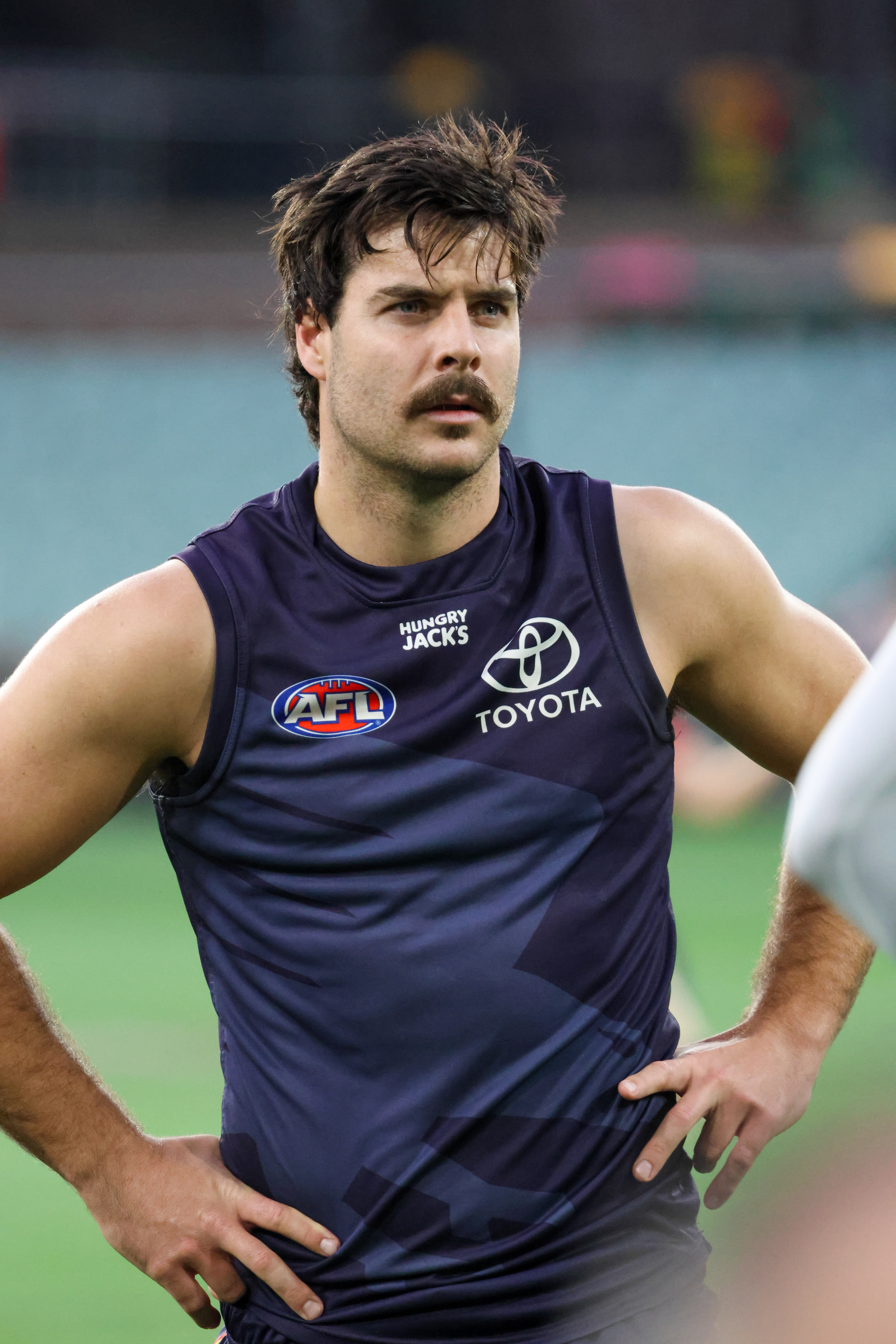
- Fogarty in 2026

Personal information
- Full name: Darcy Fogarty
- Born: 25 September 1999 (age 27); Portland, Victoria
- Original teams: Glenelg (SANFL); Lucindale Roos (KNTFL)
- Draft: No. 12, 2017 national draft
- Debut: Round 1, 2018, Adelaide vs. Essendon, at Docklands Stadium
- Height: 192 cm (6 ft 4 in)
- Weight: 100 kg (220 lb)
- Position: Full-forward

Club information
- Current club: Adelaide
- Number: 32

Playing career^{1}
Years	Club	Games (Goals)
2018–	Adelaide	142 (233)
- ^{1} Playing statistics correct to the end of the 2026 season.

Career highlights
- Adelaide leading goalkicker: 2024

Darcy Fogarty (born 25 September 1999) is a professional Australian rules footballer playing for the Adelaide Football Club in the Australian Football League (AFL). He is a full-forward, and is currently one of Adelaide's top goalscorers. He is known for his set-shot accuracy and his on-field leadership.

== Early life ==
Fogarty grew up at Lucindale in the southeast of South Australia, though he was born in Portland, Victoria. He grew up playing for local club Lucindale Roos in the Kowree-Naracoorte-Tatiara Football League. Fogarty completed his high school education at Rostrevor College in Adelaide as a boarding student. He played for Glenelg in his draft year as well as school football. He was drafted by Adelaide Crows with its first selection and twelfth overall in the 2017 national draft.

== AFL career ==
=== Early career (2018–2022) ===
Darcy Fogarty wears the 32 guernsey for the Crows, previously worn by club legends Mark Ricciuto and Patrick Dangerfield.

Fogarty made his debut in the 12-point loss to Essendon at Etihad Stadium in the opening round of the 2018 season. He struggled to break into the AFL side throughout his first few years at the club. Fogarty gained a reputation in the SANFL for being a rough player, receiving multiple reports during his time in the reserves side, including rough conduct involving Jack Hayes and Mitch Grigg. Fogarty struck good form towards the end of 2019, kicking nine goals in the last four games of the season. This return included a break-out game at Optus Stadium against West Coast, when Fogarty kicked 5 of his team's 12 goals.

Fogarty, just like the Crows and the rest of the forward line, struggled throughout the 2020 season. Playing 10 of a possible 17 games due to COVID-19, Fogarty kicked 8 goals for the year. Fogarty improved from his 2020 campaign, kicking 24 and 33 goals in the 2021 and 2022 seasons. A career-high disposal count of 20 in round 15, 2022 against North Melbourne included 4 goals and a Mark of the Year contender.

=== Breaking out (2023–2024) ===
Fogarty equalled his career-high 5 goals in 2023 during the inaugural Gather Round against Carlton. The next week, Fogarty kicked the last goal of the game against Hawthorn to lead by three points following an Izak Rankine dribbler. The goal, kicked from one of the tightest set-shot angles on the field, gave Adelaide a fourth win in a row for the first time since 2019.

In 2024, Fogarty became Adelaide's top target in the forward line, due to the absences of Riley Thilthorpe and Taylor Walker through various injuries. He also captained the Crows in the absence of Jordan Dawson in round 19, despite three vice captains ahead of him. Fogarty kicked an equal career-high five goals in round 22 against Western Bulldogs in his 100th game, and became Adelaide's first leading goalkicker other than Walker since 2018. As one of the most accurate forwards of the year, Fogarty kicked 41 goals and only 16 behinds. A career-best year was capped off with a contract extension until the end of 2031, with Fogarty turning his back on 2025 free agency.

=== Finals contention (2025–present) ===
Fogarty took a backseat to the breakout All-Australian Thilthorpe in 2025 as the Crows won the minor premiership, but Fogarty still equalled his 2024 tally with 41 goals of his own. He experienced an interrupted start to the 2026 season, experiencing an ongoing back issue, only featuring in five of Adelaide's first eleven matches. In the round 13 match against Geelong, Fogarty went goalless but kicked the match-winning behind to secure a one-point victory.

Fogarty experienced an interrupted first half to the 2026 season, suffering an ongoing back injury which saw him miss six consecutive games. His form improved following the mid-season bye, and he kicked five goals against Port Adelaide and four against West Coast. Another four-goal haul came in the away win against Sydney in what was a best-on-ground performance. However, during the match, Fogarty struck Swan Harry Cunningham, resulting in a three-match suspension.

== Statistics ==
Updated to the end of round 22, 2026.

Legend
G	Goals	K	Kicks	D	Disposals	T	Tackles
B	Behinds	H	Handballs	M	Marks

Season	Team	No.	Games	Totals							Averages (per game)							Votes
Season	Team	No.	Games	G	B	K	H	D	M	T	G	B	K	H	D	M	T	Votes
2018	Adelaide	32	10	9	3	57	27	84	32	20	0.9	0.3	5.7	2.7	8.4	3.2	2.0	0
2019	Adelaide	32	4	9	1	28	14	42	22	2	2.3	0.3	7.0	3.5	10.5	5.5	0.5	1
2020 (Note: The 2020 season was played with 17 home-and-away matches per team (down from 22) and 16-minute quarters with time on (down from 20-minute quarters with time on) due to the impact of the COVID-19 pandemic.)	Adelaide	32	10	8	1	41	33	74	19	22	0.8	0.1	4.1	3.3	7.4	1.9	2.2	0
2021	Adelaide	32	17	24	12	95	42	137	53	21	1.4	0.7	5.6	2.5	8.1	3.1	1.2	0
2022	Adelaide	32	17	33	14	113	54	167	75	31	1.9	0.8	6.6	3.2	9.8	4.4	1.8	2
2023	Adelaide	32	21	34	23	157	80	237	102	41	1.6	1.1	7.5	3.8	11.3	4.9	2.0	3
2024	Adelaide	32	23	41	16	165	85	250	111	35	1.8	0.7	7.2	3.7	10.9	4.8	1.5	2
2025	Adelaide	32	24	41	16	186	83	269	115	26	1.7	0.7	7.8	3.5	11.2	4.8	1.1	0
2026	Adelaide	32	12	25	10	96	45	141	57	27	2.1	0.8	8.0	3.8	11.8	4.8	2.3	0
Career			138	224	96	938	463	1401	586	225	1.6	0.7	6.8	3.4	10.2	4.2	1.6	8
