= Sarah Perkins =

Australian rules footballer (born 1993)

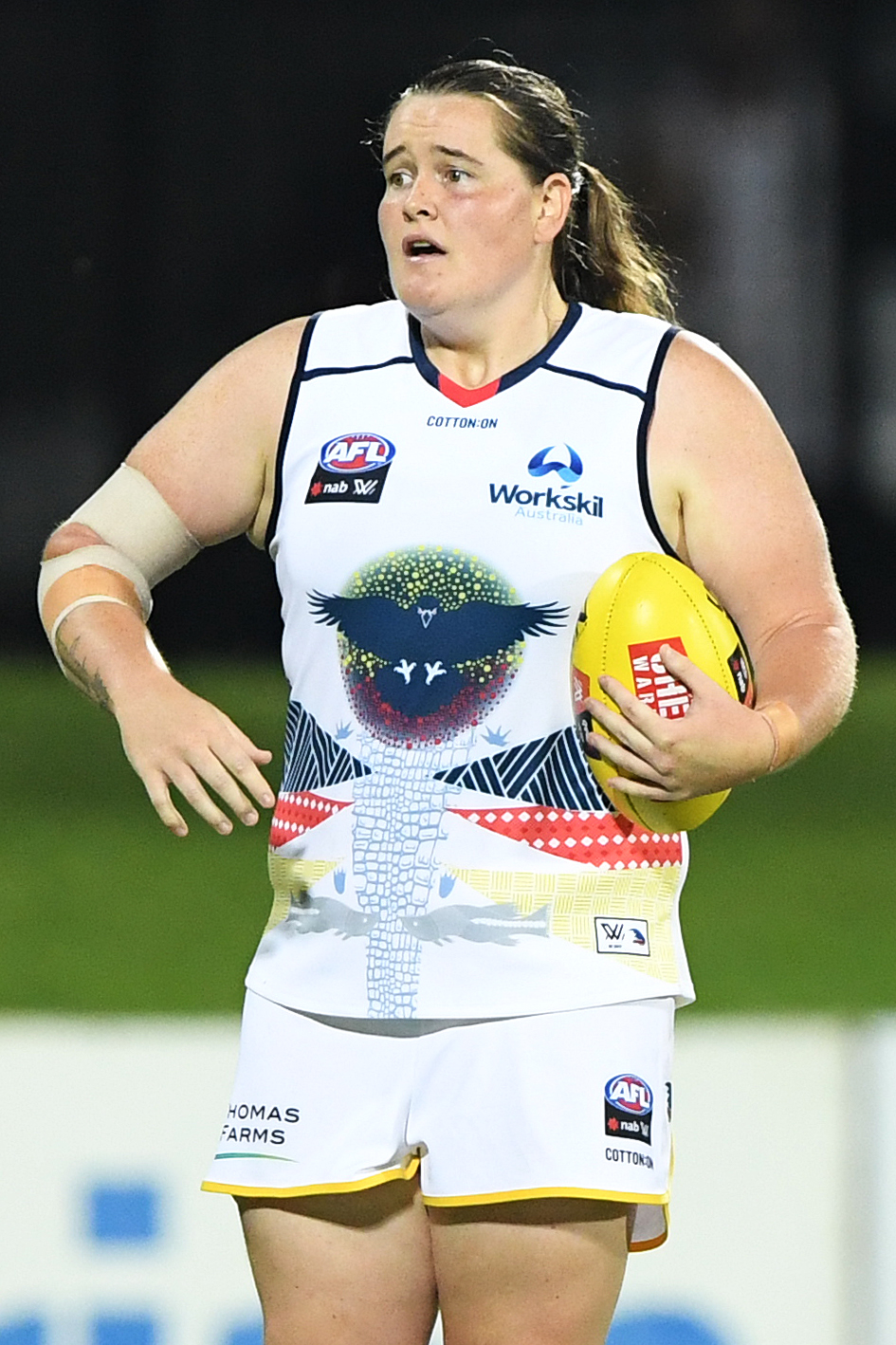
- Perkins playing for Adelaide in January 2019

Personal information
- Full name: Sarah Perkins
- Nicknames: Tex, Tank
- Born: 26 July 1993 (age 33)
- Original team: East Burwood (YJFL)
- Draft: 2016 free agent: Adelaide
- Debut: Round 1, 2017, Adelaide vs. Greater Western Sydney, at Thebarton Oval
- Height: 173 cm (5 ft 8 in)
- Position: Full-forward / ruck

Playing career^{1}
Years	Club	Games (Goals)
2017–2019	Adelaide	17 (13)
2020	Melbourne	3 (3)
2021–2022 (S6)	Gold Coast	15 (9)
2022 (S7)–2023	Hawthorn	5 (1)
Total		40 (26)

Representative team honours^{2}
Years	Team	Games (Goals)
2017	Victoria	1 (0)
- ^{1} Playing statistics correct to the end of 2023.^{2} Representative statistics correct as of 2017.

Career highlights
- AFLW premiership player: 2017; AFLW All-Australian team: 2017; Adelaide leading goalkicker: 2017; Gold Coast leading goalkicker: 2021; VFLW premiership player: 2018

Sarah Perkins (born 26 July 1993) is a former Australian rules footballer who formerly played for Adelaide, Melbourne, Gold Coast and Hawthorn in the AFL Women's competition. She was the first AFLW player to appear at 4 AFLW clubs.

== Early life and state league career ==
Raised in Melbourne, Perkins played netball and soccer before playing Australian rules football. At thirteen, Perkins was told she would no longer be able to play contact sports due to a spinal disc herniation, so she concentrated on netball for the next three years.

At the age of sixteen, she decided to start playing Australian rules football, joining the East Burwood Devils (later known as the Eastern Devils) youth side in 2009 and becoming a two-time Victorian under-18 representative. In 2011, she won the best-and-fairest medal in the inaugural Yarra Junior Football League (YJFL) Youth Girls season.

In 2012, she joined the Devils' senior side in the Victorian Women's Football League (VWFL) in 2012. In 2016, she kicked fifty-two goals and finished third in the leading goalkicker award, behind Moana Hope and Katie Brennan, and was named in the VWFL team of the year. In the eighteen months before being recruited, she lost 40 kilograms (88 lb) to fulfill her dream of playing AFL football, reducing her BMI from 45.1 to just 31.7.

== AFL Women's career ==
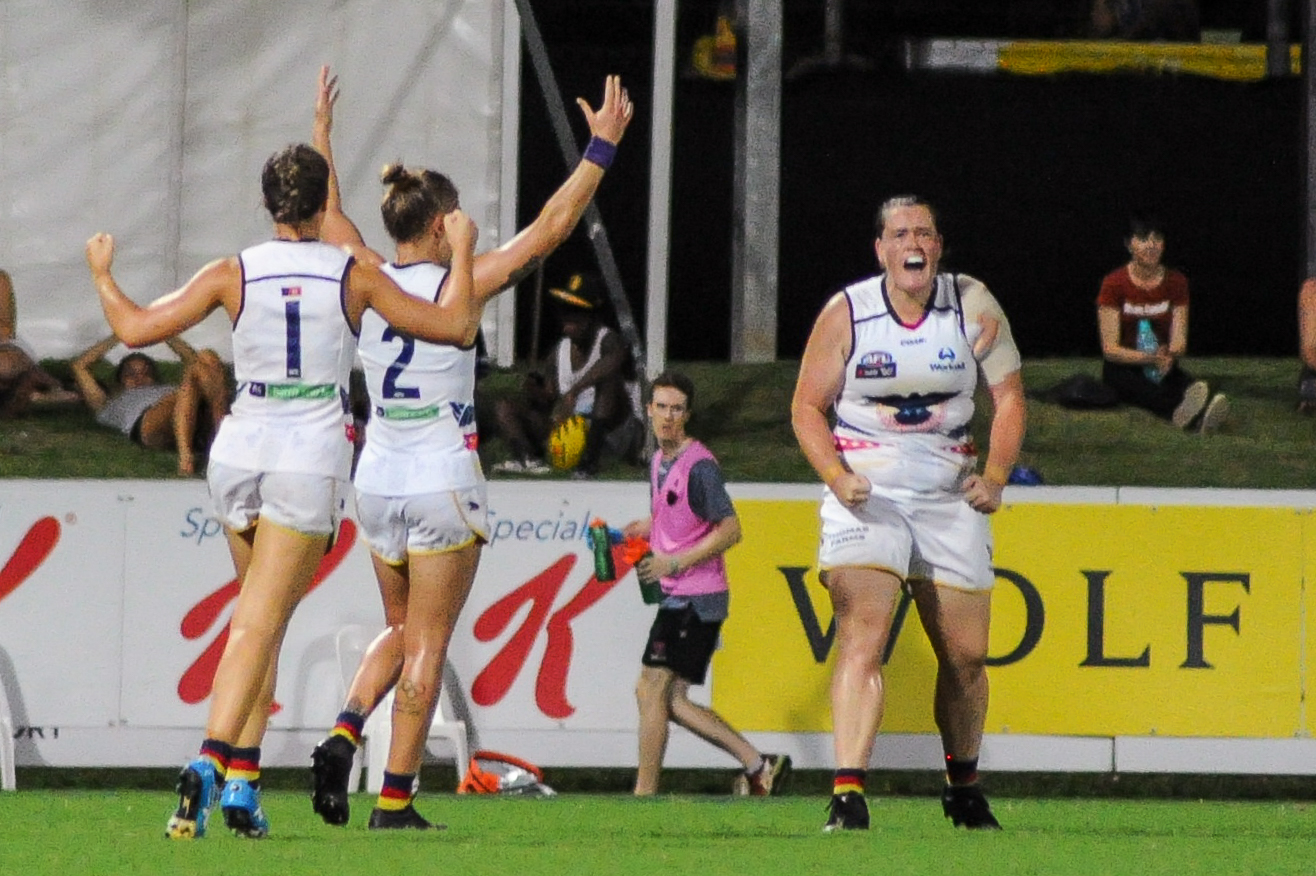
Perkins celebrating a goal in the round 6, 2017 match against Melbourne.

After being overlooked in the 2016 AFL Women's draft, Perkins was recruited by the Adelaide Football Club as a free-agent. She debuted in the thirty-six point win over Greater Western Sydney at Thebarton Oval in the opening round of the 2017 AFLW season. Labelled as the league's first cult hero by the ABC, she recorded eight disposals, three marks and a long-range goal, and earned the nickname "Tex" after The Cruel Sea lead singer, Tex Perkins. In addition, her performance in the match drew comparisons to Adelaide captain and full-forward, Taylor Walker, who is also nicknamed "Tex".

In her second match, she kicked two goals to help Adelaide defeat the Western Bulldogs at VU Whitten Oval by twenty-five points; her skills in the match led to Herald Sun journalist, Eliza Sewell, writing "she leads well and takes a strong grab...she uses her body well and a set-shot goal from forty-five metres impressed even the Bulldogs fans," Furthermore, Fox Sports Australia journalist, Sarah Olle, wrote "Perkins' leading patterns are terrific. She’s quick off the mark, uses her size to great effect, has a monstrous kick and loves a celebration" and the Australian edition of The Huffington Post said she is a player people need to know about and she is as strong as she is inspirational.

Perkins kicked four goals and created scoring opportunities for her teammates in the seventh round win against Collingwood, leading to her being named Player of the Week by the AFL Players Association.

On 25 March 2017 Perkins and the Adelaide Crows defeated the Brisbane Lions at Metricon Stadium to become the inaugural AFLW premiers. Perkins played an instrumental role in the Crows' success, and was named on the forward line in the 2017 All-Australian team.

On 18 May 2017, Adelaide signed Perkins for the 2018 AFLW season. In 2019, Sarah was delisted from Adelaide. In 2020, Sarah was added as an injury replacement player to the Melbourne list. In the 2020 AFLW Draft, Sarah was selected at pick 23 to the Gold Coast Suns.

== Statistics ==
Updated to the end of 2023.

Legend
G	Goals	K	Kicks	D	Disposals	T	Tackles
B	Behinds	H	Handballs	M	Marks	H/O	Hit-outs
#	Played in that season's premiership team

Season	Team	No.	Games	Totals								Averages (per game)								Votes
Season	Team	No.	Games	G	B	K	H	D	M	T	H/O	G	B	K	H	D	M	T	H/O	Votes
2017^{#}	Adelaide	28	8	11	8	43	24	67	18	24	21	1.4	1.0	5.4	3.0	8.4	2.3	3.0	2.6	6
2018	Adelaide	28	7	1	4	23	9	32	4	15	4	0.1	0.6	3.3	1.3	4.6	0.6	2.1	0.4	0
2019	Adelaide	28	2	1	1	6	3	9	3	5	1	0.5	0.5	3.0	1.5	4.5	1.5	2.5	0.5	0
2020	Melbourne	33	3	3	0	14	8	22	6	9	7	1.0	0.0	4.7	2.7	7.3	2.0	3.0	2.3	0
2021	Gold Coast	28	5	3	0	29	3	32	9	5	12	0.6	0.0	5.8	0.6	6.4	1.8	1.0	2.4	0
2022 (S6)	Gold Coast	28	10	6	12	53	13	66	18	14	12	0.6	1.2	5.3	1.3	6.6	1.8	1.4	1.2	0
2022 (S7)	Hawthorn	23	4	1	1	15	3	18	3	6	3	0.3	0.3	3.8	0.8	4.5	0.8	1.5	0.8	0
2023	Hawthorn	23	1	0	2	5	1	6	4	5	0	0.0	2.0	5.0	1.0	6.0	4.0	5.0	0.0	0
Career			40	26	28	188	64	252	65	83	60	0.6	0.7	4.7	1.6	6.3	1.6	2.1	1.5	6

== Honours and achievements ==
Team

- AFLW premiership player (Adelaide): 2017
- VFLW premiership player (Hawthorn): 2018

Individual

- AFLW All-Australian team: 2017
- Adelaide leading goalkicker: 2017
- Gold Coast leading goalkicker: 2021
- Victoria Australian rules football team: 2017
