= 2013 Adelaide Football Club season =

Adelaide Football Club
2013 season
- Coach: Brenton Sanderson
- Captain: Nathan van Berlo
- Home ground: AAMI Stadium
- Pre-season competition: 11th
- AFL season: 11th
- Malcolm Blight Medal: Rory Sloane
- Leading goalkicker: Tom Lynch (33)

The 2013 AFL season was the 22nd season in the Australian Football League contested by the Adelaide Crows.

== Season summary ==
=== Pre-season matches ===
2013 NAB Cup

**Rd**	**Date and local time**	**Opponent**	**Scores** (Adelaide's scores indicated in **bold**)			**Venue**	**Attendance**
**Rd**	**Date and local time**	**Opponent**	Home	Away	Result	**Venue**	**Attendance**
1	Sunday, 17 February (4:10 pm)	St Kilda	**0.3.6 (24)**	0.8.2 (50)	Lost by 26 points	AAMI Stadium (H)	
1	Sunday, 17 February (6:20 pm)	Port Adelaide	**0.6.7 (43)**	0.4.3 (27)	Won by 16 points	AAMI Stadium (H)	8,966
2	Saturday, 2 March (2:40 pm)	Geelong	2.16.12 (126)	**1.8.6 (63)**	Lost by 63 points	Simonds Stadium (A)	5,000
3	Friday, 8 March (8:10 pm)	Carlton	**4.11.7 (109)**	2.13.10 (106)	Won by 3 points	AAMI Stadium (H)	7,511

=== Home and away season ===
**Rd**	**Date and local time**	**Opponent**	**Scores** (Adelaide's scores indicated in **bold**)			**Venue**	**Attendance**	**Ladder** **position**
**Rd**	**Date and local time**	**Opponent**	Home	Away	Result	**Venue**	**Attendance**	**Ladder** **position**
1	Friday, 22 March (8:10 pm)	Essendon	**11.16 (82)**	18.9 (117)	Lost by 35 points	AAMI Stadium (H)	42,218	16th
2	Saturday, 6 April (3:40 pm)	Brisbane Lions	10.17 (77)	**14.12 (96)**	Won by 19 points	Gabba (A)	21,308	10th
3	Sunday, 14 April (4:10 pm)	Port Adelaide	17.16 (118)	**16.13 (109)**	Lost by 9 points	AAMI Stadium (A)	40,707	11th
4	Saturday, 21 April (2:50 pm)	Western Bulldogs	**12.8 (80)**	4.4 (28)	Won by 52 points	AAMI Stadium (H)	24,684	8th
5	Saturday, 27 April (4:40 pm)	Carlton	17.13 (115)	**12.11 (83)**	Lost by 32 points	MCG (A)	44,711	10th
6	Saturday, 4 May (4:10 pm)	Hawthorn	**11.12 (78)**	13.11 (89)	Lost by 11 points	AAMI Stadium (H)	37,324	12th
7	Sunday, 12 May (1:10 pm)	Greater Western Sydney	7.10 (52)	**29.13 (187)**	Won by 135 points	Skoda Stadium (A)	5,830	9th
8	Sunday, 19 May (4:10 pm)	St Kilda	**12.15 (87)**	6.11 (47)	Won by 40 points	AAMI Stadium (H)	34,605	9th
9	Sunday, 26 May (3:20 pm)	North Melbourne	19.10 (124)	**18.17 (125)**	Won by 1 point	Etihad Stadium (A)	23,033	7th
10	Saturday, 1 June (1:40 pm)	Fremantle	**8.11 (59)**	10.6 (66)	Lost by 7 points	AAMI Stadium (H)	27,684	9th
11	Saturday, 8 June (4:10 pm)	Sydney Swans	**6.14 (50)**	19.13 (127)	Lost by 77 points	AAMI Stadium (H)	38,374	10th
12	Saturday, 15 June (1:40 pm)	Richmond	16.14 (110)	**10.12 (72)**	Lost by 38 points	MCG (A)	43,615	11th
13	Bye							11th
14	Saturday, 29 June (1:40 pm)	Gold Coast	11.17 (83)	**16.15 (111)**	Won by 28 points	Metricon Stadium (A)	13,791	11th
15	Saturday, 6 July (7:10 pm)	West Coast Eagles	**9.15 (69)**	11.9 (75)	Lost by 6 points	AAMI Stadium (H)	26,426	12th
16	Friday, 12 July (7:50 pm)	Collingwood	17.9 (111)	**12.12 (84)**	Lost by 27 points	MCG (A)	54,790	12th
17	Sunday, 21 July (2:50 pm)	Geelong	**14.10 (94)**	14.8 (92)	Won by 2 points	AAMI Stadium (H)	28,603	11th
18	Saturday, 27 July (5:40 pm)	Fremantle	11.9 (75)	**7.11 (53)**	Lost by 22 points	Patersons Stadium (A)	28,765	12th
19	Sunday, 4 August (2:50 pm)	Port Adelaide	**15.13 (103)**	17.5 (107)	Lost by 4 points	AAMI Stadium (H)	43,368	13th
20	Sunday, 11 August (2:40 pm)	North Melbourne	**11.13 (79)**	10.10 (70)	Won by 9 points	AAMI Stadium (H)	31,801	13th
21	Sunday, 18 August (4:40 pm)	Western Bulldogs	20.11 (131)	**17.12 (114)**	Lost by 17 points	Etihad Stadium (A)	17,159	13th
22	Saturday, 24 August (1:15 pm)	Melbourne Football Club	**18.12 (120)**	7.10 (52)	Won by 68 points	AAMI Stadium (H)	35,643	12th
23	Saturday, 31 August (6:10 pm)	West Coast Eagles	5.13 (43)	**19.15 (129)**	Won by 86 points	Patersons Stadium (A)	29,416	11th

==== Ladder ====
2013 AFL ladder
Pos	Team	Pld	W	L	D	PF	PA	PP	Pts	
1	Hawthorn (P)	22	19	3	0	2523	1859	135.7	76	Finals series
2	Geelong	22	18	4	0	2409	1776	135.6	72	Finals series
3	Fremantle	22	16	5	1	2035	1518	134.1	66	Finals series
4	Sydney	22	15	6	1	2244	1694	132.5	62	Finals series
5	Richmond	22	15	7	0	2154	1754	122.8	60	Finals series
6	Collingwood	22	14	8	0	2148	1868	115.0	56	Finals series
7	Port Adelaide	22	12	10	0	2051	2002	102.4	48	Finals series
8	Carlton	22	11	11	0	2125	1992	106.7	44	Finals series
9	Essendon	22	14	8	0	2145	2000	107.3	56 (Note: Essendon was relegated to ninth due to irregularities in its supplements program during the 2012 season.)	
10	North Melbourne	22	10	12	0	2307	1930	119.5	40	
**11**	Adelaide	**22**	**10**	**12**	**0**	**2064**	**1909**	**108.1**	40	
12	Brisbane Lions	22	10	12	0	1922	2144	89.6	40	
13	West Coast	22	9	13	0	2038	2139	95.3	36	
14	Gold Coast	22	8	14	0	1918	2091	91.7	32	
15	Western Bulldogs	22	8	14	0	1926	2262	85.1	32	
16	St Kilda	22	5	17	0	1751	2120	82.6	20	
17	Melbourne	22	2	20	0	1455	2691	54.1	8	
18	Greater Western Sydney	22	1	21	0	1524	2990	51.0	4	

Source: AFL Tables
Rules for classification: 1) points; 2) percentage; 3) number of points for.
(P) Premiers
