= 2014 Adelaide Football Club season =

Adelaide Football Club
2014 season
- Coach: Brenton Sanderson
- Captain: Nathan van Berlo
- Home ground: Adelaide Oval
- AFL season: 10th
- Malcolm Blight Medal: Daniel Talia
- Leading goalkicker: Eddie Betts (51)
- Highest home attendance: 50,552 vs. Port Adelaide (round 15)
- Lowest home attendance: 44,216 vs. Melbourne (round 7)
- Average home attendance: 48,046
- Club membership: 54,249

The 2014 AFL season was the 23rd season in the Australian Football League contested by the Adelaide Crows.

== Squad ==
Adelaide Football Club
Senior list		Rookie List	Coaching staff
1 James Podsiadly; 2 Brad Crouch; 3 Brent Reilly; 4 Josh Jenkins; 5 Scott Thompson; 6 Luke Thompson; 7 Nathan van Berlo(c); 8 Lewis Johnston; 9 Rory Sloane (vc); 10 Matthew Jaensch; 11 Matthew Wright; 12 Daniel Talia; 13 Taylor Walker; 14 David Mackay; 15 Angus Graham; 16 Luke Brown; 17 Sam Kerridge; 18 Eddie Betts; 20 Sam Siggins; 21 Rory Atkins	22 Andy Otten; 23 Jared Petrenko; 24 Sam Jacobs; 25 Ben Rutten (ret.); 26 Richard Douglas; 27 Tom Lynch; 28 Cam Ellis-Yolmen; 29 Rory Laird; 31 Jarryd Lyons; 32 Patrick Dangerfield (vc); 33 Brodie Smith; 34 Sam Shaw; 35 Shaun McKernan; 36 Brodie Martin; 38 Mitchell Grigg; 39 Riley Knight; 40 Jason Porplyzia; 41 Kyle Hartigan; 44 Matt Crouch; 45 Ricky Henderson	30 Jack Osborn (B); 42 Charlie Cameron; 43 James Battersby; 46 Alex Spina; 47 Jake Kelly	Head coach: Brenton Sanderson; Assistant coaches: Mark Bickley (Senior Assistant/Forwards); Matthew Clarke (Ruck/Stoppages); Scott Camporeale (Midfield); Darren Milburn (Defence); Legend: (c) Captain(s); (vc) Vice-captain(s); Long-term injury list; Upgraded rookie(s); (vet) Veteran list; (B) Category B Rookie; Updated: 4 August 2014; Source(s): Senior list, Rookie list, Coaches

== Playing list changes ==
The following summarises all player changes between the conclusion of the 2013 season and the conclusion of the 2014 season.

=== In ===
Player	Previous club	League	via
(South Australia) Eddie Betts	Carlton Football Club	AFL	Free Agency
(Victoria (state)) James Podsiadly	Geelong Football Club	AFL	Trade
(Victoria (state)) Matt Crouch	North Ballarat Football Club	TAC Cup	AFL National Draft, second round (No. 23 overall)
(South Australia) Riley Knight	Woodville-West Torrens	SANFL	AFL National Draft, third round (No. 46 overall)
(Western Australia) Charlie Cameron	Swan Districts	WAFL	AFL Rookie Draft, first round (No. 7 overall)
(South Australia) James Battersby	Sturt	SANFL	AFL Rookie Draft, second round (No. 24 overall)
(Victoria (state)) Jake Kelly	Oakleigh (U18)	TAC Cup	AFL Rookie Draft, third round (No. 40 overall)
(South Australia) Alex Spina	North Adelaide	SANFL	AFL Rookie Draft, fourth round (No. 52 overall)

=== Out ===
Player	New Club	League	via
(South Australia) Graham Johncock	Mallee Park	Port Lincoln FL	Retired
(South Australia) Tim McIntyre	Central District	SANFL	Delisted
(South Australia) Tim Klaosen	Sturt Sabres	Central Australian Basketball League	Delisted
(South Australia) Dylan Orval	Collingwood reserves	VFL	Delisted
(South Australia) Ian Callinan	Adelaide reserves	SANFL	Delisted
(South Australia) Nick Joyce			Delisted
(Northern Territory) Richard Tambling	Sturt	SANFL	Delisted
(New South Wales) Aidan Riley	Melbourne	AFL	Delisted
(New South Wales) Ben Dowdell	Hamley Bridge	Adelaide Plains FL	Delisted

=== List management ===
Player	Change
(Victoria (state)) Kyle Hartigan	Promoted from the rookie list to the senior list during AFL National Draft, fifth round (No. 76 overall)
(South Australia) Rory Laird	Promoted from the rookie list to the senior list during AFL National Draft, sixth round (No. 86 overall)

== Season summary ==
=== Pre-season matches ===
2014 NAB Challenge

**Rd**	**Date and local time**	**Opponent**	**Scores** (Adelaide's scores indicated in **bold**)			**Venue**	**Attendance**
**Rd**	**Date and local time**	**Opponent**	Home	Away	Result	**Venue**	**Attendance**
1	Sunday, 16 February (4:10 pm)	Port Adelaide	**0.18.11 (119)**	0.9.5 (59)	Won by 60 points	Richmond Oval (H)	8,765
2	Monday, 24 February (7:10 pm)	Carlton	0.9.7 (61)	**1.13.12 (99)**	Won by 38 points	Etihad Stadium (A)	7,617
3	Friday, 7 March (2:00 pm)	Greater Western Sydney	11.8 (74)	**12.10 (82)**	Won by 8 points	Blacktown Olympic Park (A)	

=== Home and away season ===
**Rd**	**Date and local time**	**Opponent**	**Scores** (Adelaide's scores indicated in **bold**)			**Venue**	**Attendance**	**Ladder** **position**
**Rd**	**Date and local time**	**Opponent**	Home	Away	Result	**Venue**	**Attendance**	**Ladder** **position**
1	Thursday, 20 March (7:10 pm)	Geelong	18.11 (119)	**12.9 (81)**	Lost by 38 points	Simmonds Stadium (A)	23,622	13th
2	Saturday, 29 March (4:10 pm)	Port Adelaide	19.13 (127)	**11.7 (73)**	Lost by 54 points	Adelaide Oval (A)	50,397	16th ▼
3	Saturday, 5 April (1:40 pm)	Sydney	**9.17 (71)**	21.8 (134)	Lost by 63 points	Adelaide Oval (H)	47,426	17th ▼
4	Sunday, 13 April (3:20 pm)	St Kilda	7.8 (50)	**20.16 (136)**	Won by 86 points	Etihad Stadium (A)	22,923	15th ▲
5	Sunday, 20 April (12:40 pm)	Greater Western Sydney	**21.11 (137)**	10.12 (72)	Won by 65 points	Adelaide Oval (H)	44,770	12th ▲
6	Sunday, 27 April (1:10 pm)	Western Bulldogs	12.11 (83)	**13.14 (92)**	Won by 9 points	Etihad Stadium (A)	17,404	10th ▲
7	Saturday, 3 May (4:10 pm)	Melbourne	**9.13 (67)**	11.4 (70)	Lost by 3 points	Adelaide Oval (H)	44,216	11th ▼
8	Bye							11th
9	Thursday, 15 May (7:20 pm)	Collingwood	**10.16 (76)**	7.13 (55)	Won by 21 points	Adelaide Oval (H)	50,051	10th ▲
10	Sunday, 25 May (4:40 pm)	Carlton	12.9 (81)	**10.16 (76**	Lost by 5 points	Melbourne Cricket Ground (A)	32,419	10th
11	Sunday, 1 June (12:40 pm)	Gold Coast	**16.13 (109)**	11.11 (77)	Won by 32 points	Adelaide Oval (H)	49,069	9th ▲
12	Sunday, 8 June (2:10 pm)	Fremantle	12.18 (90)	**7.8 (50)**	Lost by 40 points	Patersons Stadium (A)	35,389	10th ▼
13	Saturday, 14 June (7:10 pm)	North Melbourne	**16.13 (109)**	10.13 (73)	Won by 36 points	Adelaide Oval (H)	47,205	10th
14	Saturday, 21 June (7:40 pm)	Essendon	15.11 (101)	**14.8 (92)**	Lost by 9 points	Etihad Stadium (A)	30,948	11th ▼
15	Sunday, 29 June (3:40 pm)	Port Adelaide	**14.15 (99)**	10.16 (76)	Won by 23 points	Adelaide Oval (H)	50,552	9th ▲
16	Saturday, 5 July (2:10 pm)	Greater Western Sydney	9.18 (72)	**20.20 (140)**	Won by 68 points	GIANTS Stadium (A)	8,383	9th
17	Friday, 11 July (7:20 pm)	Hawthorn	**14.8 (92)**	15.14 (104)	Lost by 12 points	Adelaide Oval (H)	50,321	10th ▼
18	Sunday, 27 July (4:40 pm)	Collingwood	12.10 (82)	**14.14 (98)**	Won by 16 points	Melbourne Cricket Ground (A)	41,486	**8th** ▲
19	Saturday, 2 August (1:10 pm)	West Coast	**16.9 (105)**	20.16 (136)	Lost by 31 points	Adelaide Oval (H)	49,470	10th ▼
20	Sunday, 10 August (1:10 pm)	Brisbane Lions	9.9 (63)	**25.18 (168)**	Won by 105 points	The Gabba (A)	19,657	**7th** ▲
21	Saturday, 16 August (7:10 pm)	Richmond	**9.15 (69)**	10.19 (79)	Lost by 10 points	Adelaide Oval (H)	50,459	**8th** ▼
22	Saturday, 23 August (1:45 pm)	North Melbourne	14.17 (101)	**13.16 (94)**	Lost by 7 points	Bellerive Oval (A)	10,702	11th ▼
23	Sunday, 31 August (2:50 pm)	St Kilda	**22.9 (141)**	9.8 (62)	Won by 79 points	Adelaide Oval (H)	44,969	10th ▲

== Individual awards and records ==
Milestones

- Round 3 - Matt Crouch (debut)
- Round 5 - Scott Thompson (250 career games), Matthew Jaensch (50 career games)
- Round 6 - Eddie Betts (300 career goals)
- Round 9 - Charlie Cameron (debut)
- Round 12 - Cam Ellis-Yolmen (debut)
- Round 13 - Brent Reilly (200 career games)
- Round 17 - Eddie Betts (200 career games)
- Round 18 - Richard Douglas (150 career games), James Podsiadly (100 career games)
- Round 19 - Sam Jacobs (100 career games)
- Round 23 - Rory Sloane (100 career games)

All-Australian Team

- Daniel Talia - Full-back
- Brodie Smith - Half-back flank
- Eddie Betts (nominated)
- Sam Jacobs (nominated)

AFL Rising Star

The following Adelaide players were nominated for the 2014 NAB AFL Rising Star award:

- Round 5 – Matt Crouch (nominated)

22 Under 22 team

- Daniel Talia - Full-back
- Brodie Smith - Half-back flank
