= Brenton Sanderson =

Australian rules footballer, born 1974

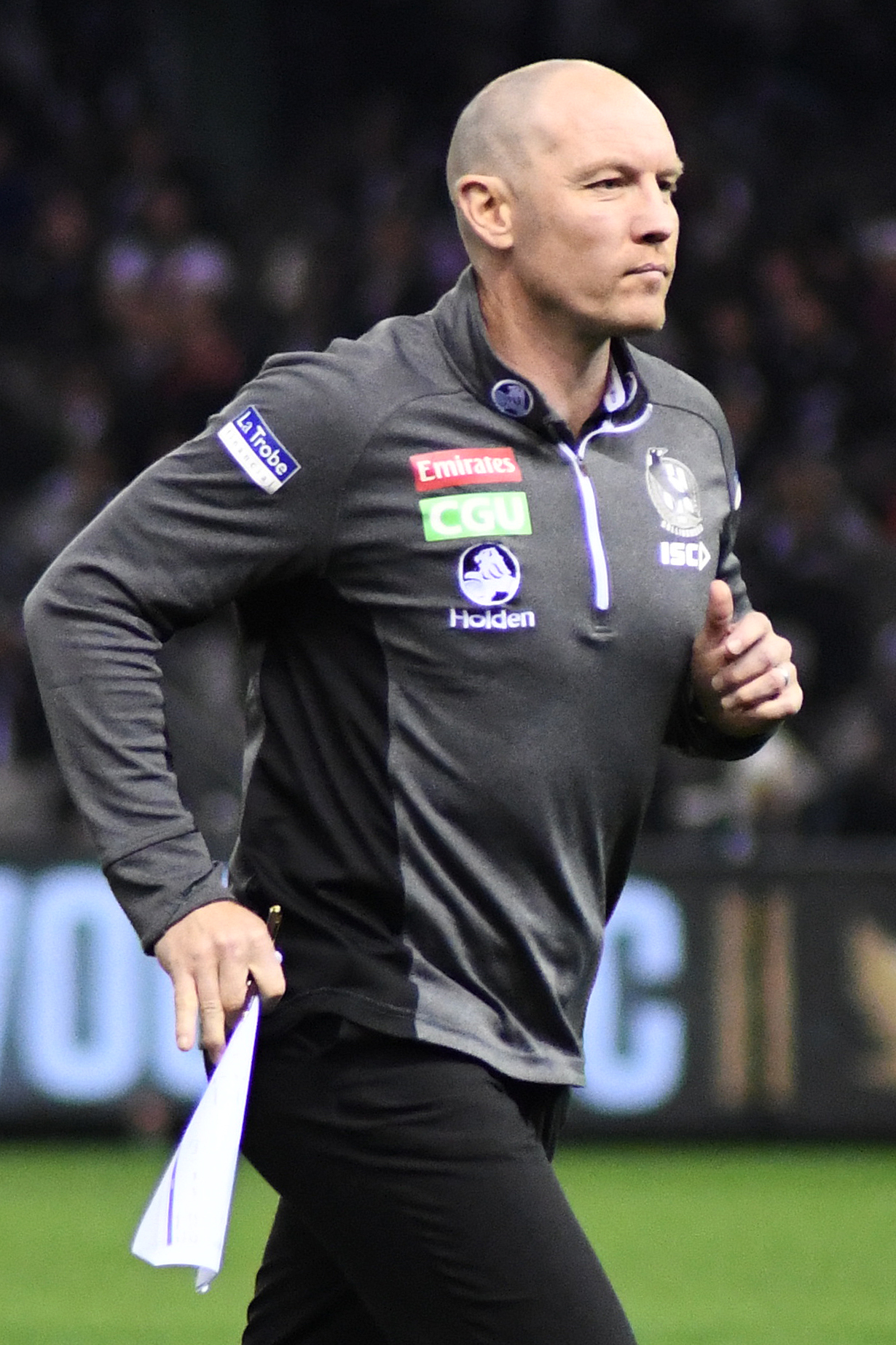
- Sanderson in August 2018

Personal information
- Full name: Brenton James Sanderson
- Born: 27 February 1974 (age 52); Adelaide, South Australia
- Original team: Sturt (SANFL)

Playing career^{1}
Years	Club	Games (Goals)
1992–1993	Adelaide	6 (4)
1994	Collingwood	4 (1)
1995–2005	Geelong	199 (29)
Total		209 (34)

Coaching career^{3}
Years	Club	Games (W–L–D)
2012–2014	Adelaide	69 (39–30–0)
- ^{1} Playing statistics correct to the end of 2005.^{3} Coaching statistics correct as of 2014.

Career highlights
- Club: Geelong Best & Fairest (2001); Coaching: NAB Cup (2012)

Brenton James Sanderson (born 27 February 1974) is a former Australian rules football player and is the former senior coach of the Adelaide Football Club in the Australian Football League (AFL).

== Career ==
=== Early career ===
Originally from Adelaide, South Australia, Sanderson moved from Sturt to Adelaide as one of their 10 concession picks. While at Sturt he injured his right leg and had to learn to kick left footed, this subsequently became his primary kicking foot. He finally made his debut in 1992 but had limited opportunities and played just 6 games until he moved to Collingwood. He played just 4 games with the club following two hamstring injuries during the year, but Sanderson once said he learned a lot about the right attitude to preparation and training, as he learned from living with Nathan Buckley.

=== Geelong ===
In 1995 Sanderson moved to Geelong and reinvented himself as a half-back flanker, generating a lot of run out of defence. He had his best season in 2001, when he took out the Carji Greeves Medal as well as earning International rules selection.

In 2005 before the finals series, Sanderson announced he would be retiring from AFL football. His last match was the semi-final loss to the Sydney Swans at the SCG.

== Coaching career ==
=== Port Adelaide Football Club assistant coach (2005–2007) ===
Immediately after Sanderson's retirement from playing he moved back to Adelaide to become an assistant coach at Port Adelaide Football Club in 2005 under senior coach Mark Williams,

=== Geelong Football Club assistant coach (2007–2011) ===
Sanderson then headed back to Geelong to become an assistant coach under senior coach Mark Thompson in 2007.

=== Adelaide Football Club senior coach (2012–2014) ===
On Monday 19 September 2011, Sanderson was appointed senior coach of the Adelaide Football Club ahead of red hot favourite Scott Burns and premiership captain Mark Bickley. Sanderson replaced caretaker senior coach Mark Bickley, who replaced Neil Craig after Craig resigned in the middle of the 2011 season.

After getting to within a goal of reaching the AFL Grand Final in 2012, the Crows underachieved in the ensuing two years, finishing 11th and 10th respectively and therefore failing to make the finals. As a result, on 17 September 2014 (almost three years to the day since he was appointed) Sanderson was sacked as senior coach of the Adelaide Crows. He left the Crows having won 39 of his 69 games in charge – a 56.5 per cent success rate – the second-best of any Crows coach to date. Sanderson was then replaced by Phil Walsh as Adelaide Football Club senior coach.

=== AFL National Academy Head coach (2015–2016) ===
Sanderson was Head Coach at the AFL National Academy from 2015 to 2016.

=== Collingwood Football Club assistant coach (2016–2021) ===
In 2016, Sanderson was appointed as a Senior Assistant Coach at the Collingwood Football Club under senior coach Nathan Buckley, overseeing forward line and ball movement. Sanderson left the Collingwood Football Club at the end of the 2021 season.

== Personal life ==
Sanderson was at the Sari Club, just hours before the 2002 Bali bombings killed 202 people. He is also a qualified pilot.

== Statistics ==
=== Playing statistics ===
Legend
G	Goals	K	Kicks	D	Disposals	T	Tackles
B	Behinds	H	Handballs	M	Marks

Season	Team	No.	Games	Totals							Averages (per game)						
Season	Team	No.	Games	G	B	K	H	D	M	T	G	B	K	H	D	M	T
1992	Adelaide	36	4	3	2	25	26	51	9	3	0.8	0.5	6.3	6.5	12.8	2.3	0.8
1993	Adelaide	36	2	1	1	11	13	24	7	2	0.5	0.5	5.5	6.5	12.0	3.5	1.0
1994	Collingwood	17	4	1	0	20	17	37	9	3	0.3	0.0	5.0	4.3	9.3	2.3	0.8
1995	Geelong	27	13	2	0	60	57	117	42	7	0.2	0.0	4.6	4.4	9.0	3.2	0.5
1996	Geelong	27	21	2	2	224	124	348	101	23	0.1	0.1	10.7	5.9	16.6	4.8	1.1
1997	Geelong	27	21	8	6	205	81	286	84	29	0.4	0.3	9.8	3.9	13.6	4.0	1.4
1998	Geelong	27	22	5	3	291	98	389	102	33	0.2	0.1	13.2	4.5	17.7	4.6	1.5
1999	Geelong	27	15	4	5	204	55	259	81	14	0.3	0.3	13.6	3.7	17.3	5.4	0.9
2000	Geelong	27	23	1	0	247	102	349	107	29	0.0	0.0	10.7	4.4	15.2	4.7	1.3
2001	Geelong	27	22	2	1	240	98	338	104	29	0.1	0.0	10.9	4.5	15.4	4.7	1.3
2002	Geelong	27	12	1	1	105	40	145	48	24	0.1	0.1	8.8	3.3	12.1	4.0	2.0
2003	Geelong	27	22	2	0	264	120	384	116	38	0.1	0.0	12.0	5.5	17.5	5.3	1.7
2004	Geelong	27	17	1	0	147	74	221	76	21	0.1	0.0	8.6	4.4	13.0	4.5	1.2
2005	Geelong	27	11	1	2	93	77	170	64	20	0.1	0.2	8.5	7.0	15.5	5.8	1.8
Career			209	34	23	2136	982	3118	950	275	0.2	0.1	10.2	4.7	14.9	4.5	1.3

== Head coaching record ==
Team	Year	Home and Away Season					Finals			
Team	Year	Won	Lost	Drew	%	Position	Won	Lost	Win %	Result
ADE	2012	17	5	0	.773	2nd out of 18	1	2	.333	Lost to Hawthorn in Preliminary Final
ADE	2013	10	12	0	.455	11th out of 18	—	—	—	—
ADE	2014	11	11	0	.500	10th out of 18	—	—	—	—
Total		38	28	0	.576		1	2	.333	
