= Stuart Palmer (footballer) =

Personal information
- Full name: Stuart Palmer
- Born: 20 May 1951 (age 75); Nelson, England
- Height: 193 cm (6 ft 4 in)
- Weight: 86 kg (190 lb)

Playing career
Years	Club	Games (Goals)
1969-1985	South Adelaide	337 (28)

Stuart Palmer was an Australian rules footballer for the South Adelaide Football Club in the SANFL. Palmer holds the games record for South Adelaide.
