= Riley Thilthorpe =

Australian rules football player

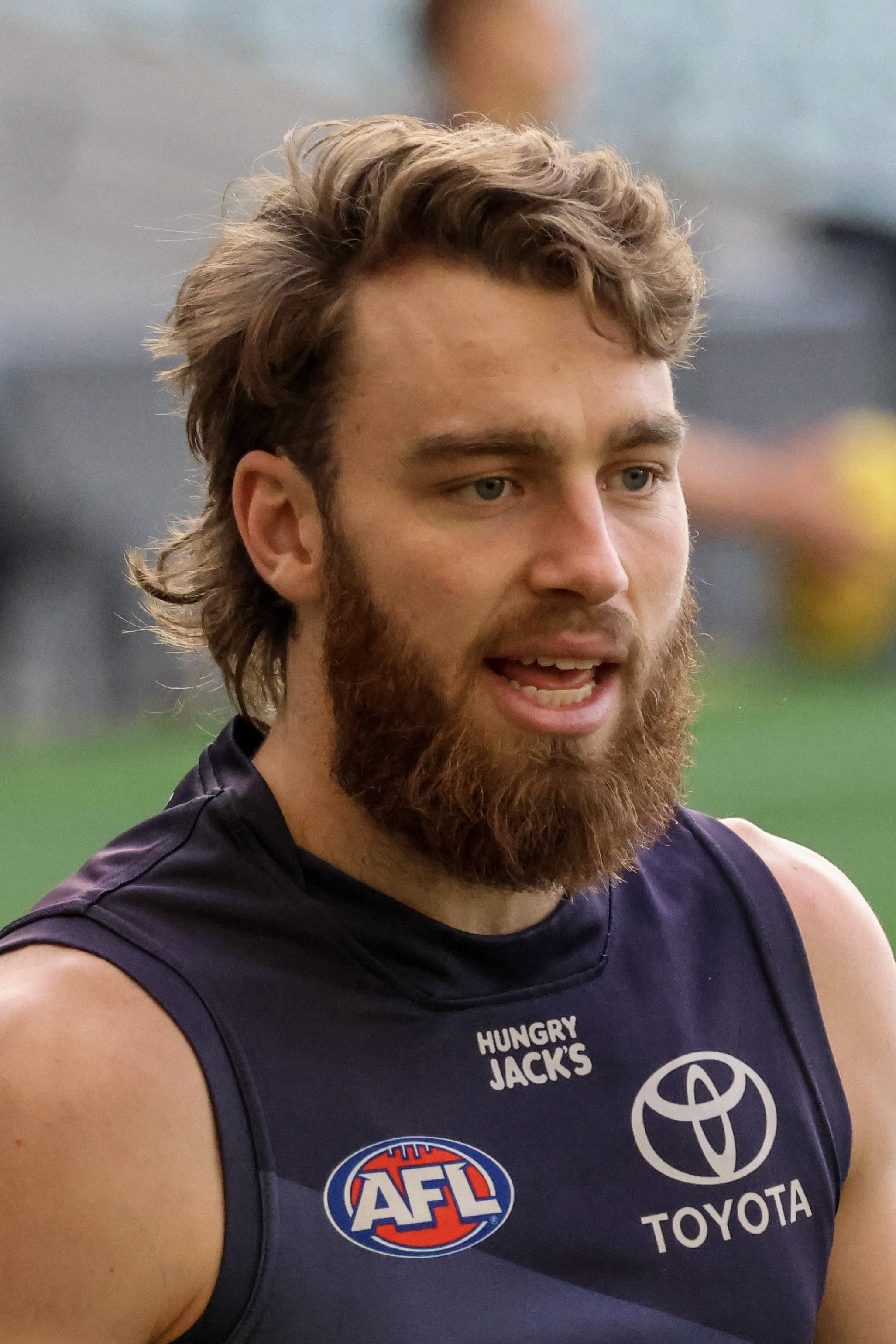
- Thilthorpe in 2026

Personal information
- Full name: Riley James Thilthorpe
- Nickname: Filthy
- Born: 7 July 2002 (age 24); Adelaide, South Australia
- Original teams: West Adelaide (SANFL); Goodwood Saints (AdFL)
- Draft: No. 2, 2020 AFL draft
- Debut: Round 6, 2021, Adelaide vs. Hawthorn, at University of Tasmania Stadium
- Height: 201 cm (6 ft 7 in)
- Weight: 105 kg (231 lb)
- Position: Key Forward

Club information
- Current club: Adelaide
- Number: 7

Playing career^{1}
Years	Club	Games (Goals)
2021–	Adelaide	97 (150)
- ^{1} Playing statistics correct to the end of round 23, 2026.

Career highlights
- All-Australian team: 2025; Adelaide leading goalkicker: 2025; Showdown Medal: 2025; Rising Star nomination: 2021

Riley James Thilthorpe (born 7 July 2002) is an Australian rules footballer who plays for the Adelaide Football Club in the Australian Football League (AFL). He was recruited by the Adelaide Football Club with the 2nd draft pick in the 2020 AFL draft.

== Early life ==
Born in Adelaide, Thilthorpe grew up a fan of the Adelaide Crows. His father, Ben, was an Australian ice hockey player, and as such Riley played the sport in his youth, representing South Australia until under-11 level.

Thilthorpe originally played for the Goodwood Saints in the Adelaide Footy League. He made his league debut with West Adelaide in the South Australian National Football League (SANFL) in 2019 as a 17-year-old. Across 2019 and his draft year of 2020 he played 15 league games for the Bloods. In his second senior game, Thilthorpe kicked three goals against Sturt and 15 disposals, 8 marks and two goals the following week against Central District. He also impressed with his performance in the NAB AFL Futures match before the 2019 AFL Grand Final.

The Adelaide Crows held the overall number one pick in the 2020 national draft after finishing 18th on the ladder in 2020. After their bid for Jamarra Ugle-Hagan was matched by the Western Bulldogs, the Crows selected Thilthorpe at pick two, their highest-ever pick in a national draft.

== AFL career ==
Thilthorpe debuted in round 6 of the 2021 AFL season, as he was impressive with 16 disposals and kicked 5 goals. His 5 goals is the highest ever by a Crows debutant, tied with Josh Rachele, who matched the record a year later. Jason Dunstall noted the performance as "the emergence of a future star."

In Round 13, against St Kilda, Thilthorpe kicked the match-winning goal over his head on his opposite boot in the last minute of the game. It completed Adelaide's 36-point comeback. Thilthorpe was rewarded with the NAB AFL Rising Star nomination for Round 13.

After a strong off-season prior to 2024, Thilthorpe sustained a knee injury in a pre-season match against West Coast. He had surgery and missed more than four months of football. Thilthorpe finally made his return in July 2024, coming on as the substitute in the fourth quarter against St Kilda and kicking two match-winning goals. He played his 50th game just a few weeks later against Geelong, and kicked three goals in the same game, the first of which was his 50th career goal. Following a successful return from injury in the latter half of the season, Thilthorpe signed a contract extension until the end of 2028.

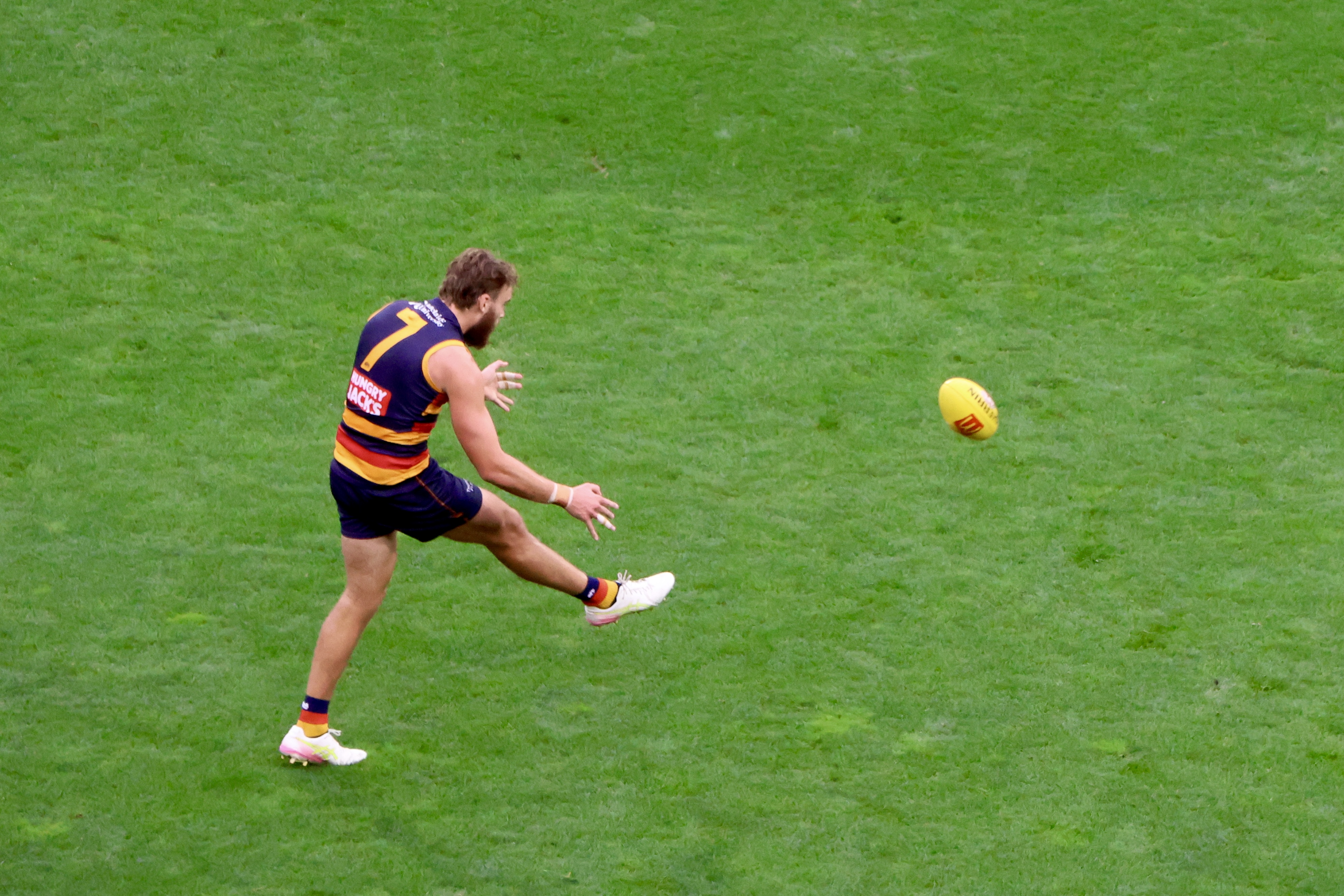
Thilthorpe kicks during the round 6, 2025 match against Greater Western Sydney

Thilthorpe enjoyed career-best form at the start of the 2025 season. Across his first four games, he kicked 14 goals to lead the Coleman Medal count in Round 4 and at that point was the highest-rated player in the competition over the previous 10 regular season rounds. An equal career-high five goals in a narrow loss to Gold Coast earned the forward 10 coaches votes. He improved his personal best later in the year against the Western Bulldogs when he kicked six goals in a high-scoring affair. The following week, Thilthorpe kicked his 100th career goal in the Round 19 win over Gold Coast. He produced a best-on-ground performance against Port Adelaide in Showdown 58 despite heavy rain, winning his first Showdown Medal.

== Statistics ==
Updated to the end of round 22, 2026.

Legend
G	Goals	K	Kicks	D	Disposals	T	Tackles
B	Behinds	H	Handballs	M	Marks

Season	Team	No.	Games	Totals							Averages (per game)							Votes
Season	Team	No.	Games	G	B	K	H	D	M	T	G	B	K	H	D	M	T	Votes
2021	Adelaide	7	14	18	10	94	58	152	44	19	1.3	0.7	6.7	4.1	10.9	3.1	1.4	0
2022	Adelaide	7	11	8	7	70	43	113	49	24	0.7	0.6	6.4	3.9	10.3	4.5	2.2	0
2023	Adelaide	7	21	18	9	126	97	223	74	31	0.9	0.4	6.0	4.6	10.6	3.5	1.5	2
2024	Adelaide	7	7	15	6	53	25	78	32	12	2.1	0.9	7.6	3.6	11.1	4.6	1.7	0
2025	Adelaide	7	25	60	29	241	102	343	138	52	2.4	1.2	9.6	4.1	13.7	5.5	2.1	14
2026	Adelaide	7	18	29	22	150	80	230	98	30	1.6	1.2	8.3	4.4	12.8	5.4	1.7	0
Career			96	148	83	734	405	1139	435	168	1.5	0.9	7.6	4.2	11.9	4.5	1.8	16
