= Stevie-Lee Thompson =

Australian rules footballer

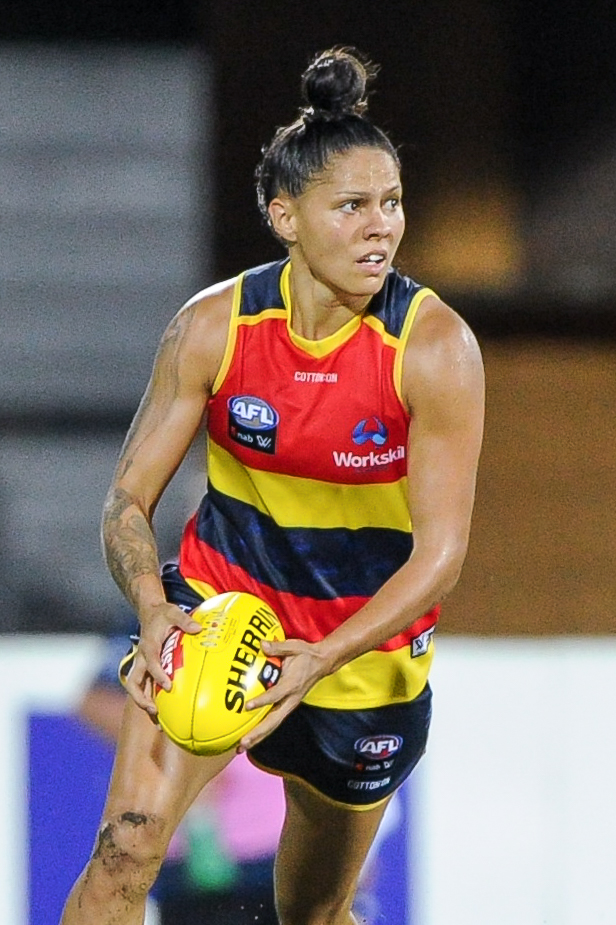
- Thompson playing for Adelaide in January 2018

Personal information
- Born: 23 March 1992 (age 34); Brisbane, Queensland
- Original team: Wanderers (NTFL)
- Draft: No. 106, 2016 AFL Women's draft
- Debut: Round 1, 2017, Adelaide vs. Greater Western Sydney, at Thebarton Oval
- Height: 169 cm (5 ft 7 in)
- Position: Defender / Forward

Playing career^{1}
Years	Club	Games (Goals)
2017–2025	Adelaide	97 (27)

Representative team honours^{2}
Years	Team	Games (Goals)
2017	The Allies	1 (0)
- ^{1} Playing statistics correct to the end of 2025.^{2} Representative statistics correct as of the 2018 season.

Career highlights
- 3× AFL Women's premiership player: 2017, 2019, 2022 (S6); Adelaide leading goalkicker: 2019; AFL Women's leading goalkicker: 2019; All-Australian team: 2019

Stevie-Lee Thompson (born 23 March 1992) is a former Australian rules footballer who played for the Adelaide Football Club in the AFL Women's competition.

== Early life and state football ==
Thompson was born in Brisbane but was raised in Hawke's Bay, New Zealand, from age 4, not returning to Brisbane with her family until age 11. She was a star in touch rugby before suffering a car crash; after that, she picked up Australian rules football. In 2015, after moving to Darwin, she started playing the game with the Wanderers Football Club in the local Northern Territory Football League (NTFL). From 2018, Thompson represented NT Thunder in the VFL Women's (VFLW), kicking 5 goals in 10 games for the club over two seasons.

== AFL Women's career ==
Thompson was drafted by Adelaide with their fourteenth selection and 106th overall in the 2016 AFL Women's draft. She made her debut in the 36-point win against Greater Western Sydney at Thebarton Oval in the opening round of the 2017 season. She was a part of Adelaide's premiership side after the club defeated Brisbane by six points at Metricon Stadium in the AFL Women's Grand Final. She played every match in her debut season to finish with eight matches. At the end of 2017, Thompson represented the Allies in the AFLW State of Origin match. Adelaide signed Thompson for the 2018 season during the trade period in May 2017. After living and training in Darwin during her first season, Thompson relocated to Adelaide from the 2018 season. The 2019 season was very successful for Thompson. Following a switch from playing as a defender to playing as a forward, she was Adelaide's leading goalkicker and the league's leading goalkicker after kicking 13 goals in the regular season. She also kicked a goal for Adelaide as they claimed their second premiership, beating Carlton at Adelaide Oval in the 2019 Grand Final. After the season, Thompson was selected for the 2019 AFL Women's All-Australian team.

Following the 2025 AFL Women's season, Thompson retired from the AFLW. She left the Crows as a three-time premiership player across her 97 games.

== Personal life ==
Thompson grew up in Brisbane as part of a large family, with eight brothers and sisters, after her family moved from Hawke's Bay in New Zealand. Thompson lives with her partner Tegan and works as a support officer at Adelaide High School in Adelaide, South Australia
