= Taylor Walker (footballer) =

Australian rules footballer (born 1990)

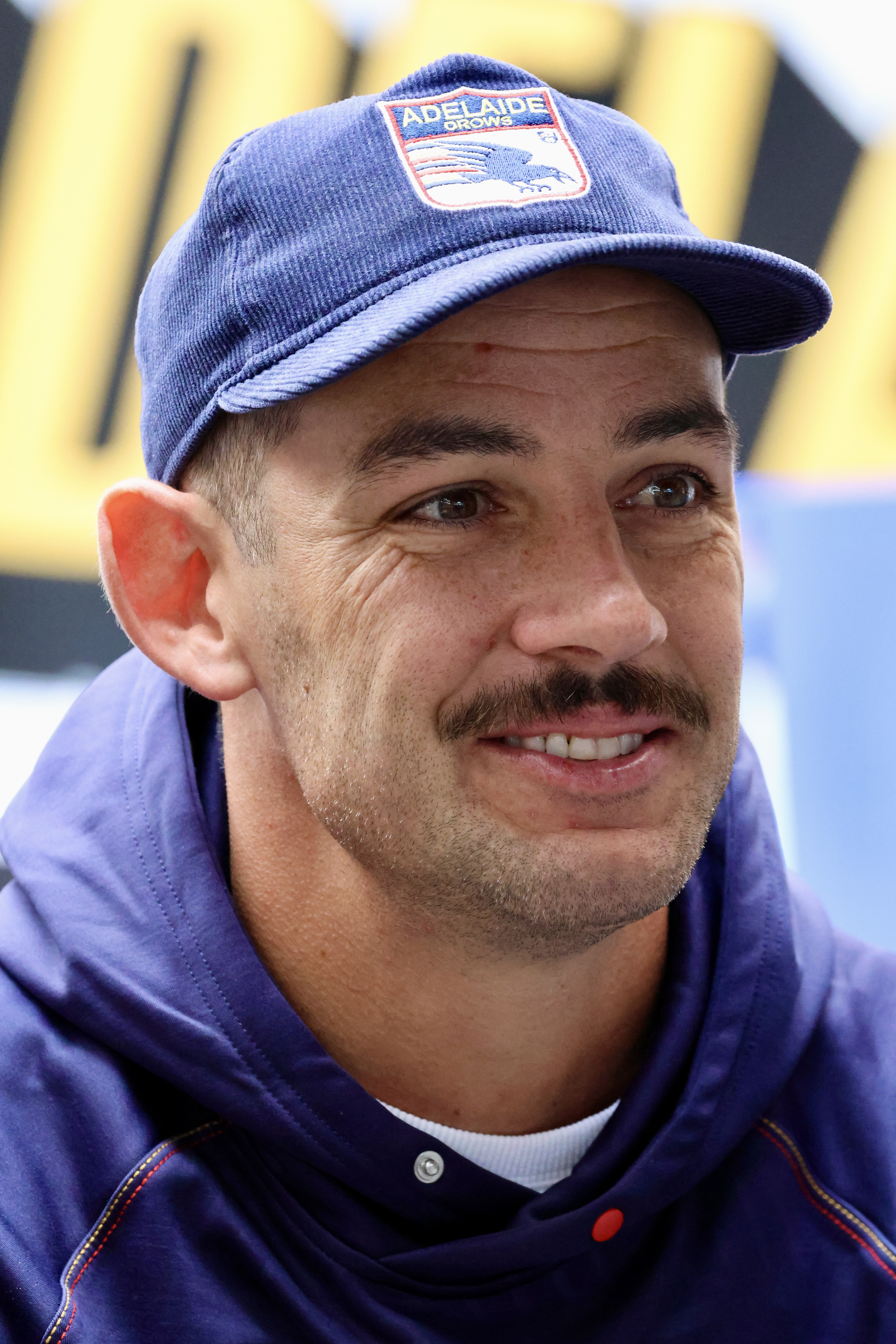
- Walker at the 2026 Gather Round

Personal information
- Full name: Taylor Walker
- Nicknames: Tex, The Texan
- Born: 25 April 1990 (age 36); Adelaide, South Australia, Australia
- Original teams: North Broken Hill (BHFL); NSW/ACT Rams (TAC Cup)
- Draft: No. 75 (NSW SP), 2007 national draft
- Debut: Round 1, 2009, Adelaide vs. Collingwood, at MCG
- Height: 195 cm (6 ft 5 in)
- Weight: 100 kg (220 lb)
- Position: Key forward

Playing career^{1}
Years	Club	Games (Goals)
2008–2026	Adelaide	319 (715)

Representative team honours
Years	Team	Games (Goals)
2020	All Stars	1 (0)
- ^{1} Playing statistics correct to the end of 2026.

Career highlights
- Adelaide captain: 2015–2018; co-captain: 2019; All-Australian team: 2023; Adelaide all-time leading goal kicker; 7× Adelaide leading goalkicker: 2011, 2012, 2019, 2020, 2021, 2022, 2023; Showdown Medal: 2023; 2× AFLPA best captain: 2016, 2017; 22under22 team: 2012; AFL Rising Star nominee: 2009; Signature

Taylor Walker (born 25 April 1990) is a former professional Australian rules footballer who played his entire career for the Adelaide Football Club in the Australian Football League (AFL). He was drafted with pick 75 in the 2007 national draft and captained Adelaide from 2015 to 2019.

In 2020, Walker became Adelaide's all-time leading goalkicker. Walker kicked a career-high 76 goals in 2023, making the All-Australian team for the first time.

== Early life ==
Taylor Walker was born on 25 April 1990 at the Adelaide Medical Centre for Women and Children in Adelaide, South Australia and was raised in Broken Hill to Wayne and Margaret Walker as the youngest of three siblings. Walker attended Willyama High School. His father, Wayne, was a prominent footballer in Broken Hill who played more than 350 games. Wayne wasn't an especially gifted or natural player but trained very hard and became a highly respected centreman for the Centrals in Broken Hill. In 2006, Walker accepted a NSW Scholarship contract with Adelaide at the age of 16. However, he continued to play for his senior local amateur league team, North Broken Hill, in the Broken Hill Football League, leading them to the 2007 premiership with a seven-goal, best-on-ground performance, playing at centre half-forward.

== Football career ==
=== Early career (2008–2011) ===
Walker was drafted with pick 75 in the 2007 national draft.

Walker spent his first year at the Crows playing for Norwood in the SANFL, kicking more than 50 goals in the 2008 season. He made his AFL debut in round 1 the next season, against Collingwood, and held his place in the side for the next 12 rounds. This included a five-goal performance against reigning premiers Hawthorn in round 10, which earned him an AFL Rising Star nomination. However, only three weeks later he was dropped from the senior side and played just one more match for the season, with coach Neil Craig wanting him to work on deficiencies in his game.

Walker returned to the side in 2010 and showed fluctuating form, showing glimpses of brilliance alongside some poor performances. He was dropped from the side on a number of occasions throughout the year, sparking rumours that he and head coach Neil Craig were not seeing eye to eye and that Craig was using Walker as a scapegoat for Adelaide's poor form throughout the year. Again, Walker was accused of not showing enough defensive pressure in the forward line. He finished with 35 goals for the season from 18 games, including two sets of four goals against Fremantle and then Geelong.

Early in 2011, Walker was dropped once again and was seen drinking a beer on live television at a SANFL game, sparking speculation that he 'didn't care' and may have signed a contract with incoming expansion team Greater Western Sydney, with whom Walker had been previously strongly linked. However, late in the season, Walker re-signed with the Crows for a further four years. Despite inconsistent form and injuries, Walker was the club's leading goalkicker in 2011, booting 32 goals from only 13 games, at an average of 2.5 per game, ranked sixth in the AFL.

=== Improvement (2012–2014) ===
In 2012, Walker improved under new coach Brenton Sanderson. By Round 8, Walker led the Coleman Medal count before two separate suspensions for rough tackles cost him the chance to lead the league's goalscoring. However, Walker returned to finish the season in good form, booting five goals in Adelaide's come-from-behind Semi-Final win over Fremantle, and four goals the next week in the Crows' Preliminary Final loss to Hawthorn. In total, Walker kicked 63 goals for the season and averaged 3.3 goals per game, second in the AFL behind Lance Franklin.

In Round 5, 2013, against Carlton, Walker hyperextended his right knee and suffered an anterior cruciate ligament injury requiring a full reconstruction and 12-month rehabilitation period. In the meantime, Walker made headlines by appearing on The Footy Show and agreeing to shave his famous mullet to raise money for the Leukaemia Foundation. He then went on to raise a total of $66,672.45 for the foundation before having his head shaved by TV personality and former Geelong player Sam Newman.

Walker made his return to competitive football early in the 2014 season in the Adelaide Crows reserves' side, kicking three goals in a 37-point loss to Glenelg. He made his return to the AFL against Collingwood in Round 9 at the Adelaide Oval, and played every game for the remainder of the season, kicking multiple goals in 11 games and a career-best six against the Brisbane Lions. He finished with 34 goals in 15 games, and averaged a career-high 14.7 disposals per game. In November, Walker extended his contract with the Crows for three further years, until the end of 2018.

=== Captaincy (2015–2019) ===
In January 2015, Walker was appointed captain of Adelaide. He returned to his best form in that year, finishing fourth in the Coleman Medal with 55 goals in the home-and-away season and leading the club inspirationally as they overcame the death of senior coach Phil Walsh to make the semi-finals. He played his 100th AFL game in round 18 against the Sydney Swans at the Sydney Cricket Ground, fittingly in his home state of New South Wales.

In 2016, he was voted the AFL Player's Association captain of the year.

Walker went into his third season as captain with a full pre-season of training, but when the season began there were concerns that a hamstring strain suffered in a JLT Series match against Brisbane Lions could rule him out of the Crows’ first match against Greater Western Sydney. He worked hard to recover, going to extra training sessions in the week leading up to the match, but was ultimately left out of the team. He returned in the second round against Hawthorn. Walker began the season with great form, starring with five goals and four goal assists in the first half against Essendon in the absence of fellow key forwards Josh Jenkins and Mitch McGovern. He kicked 18 goals in his first five games while Adelaide remained undefeated, but he began to struggle, only kicking 16 in his next seven with the Crows losing five of those games. Though he was still contracted to play for the club until 2018, Walker signed a contract extension to the end of 2021. In a match against the Western Bulldogs, Walker bumped defender Jason Johannisen into a goal post. Johannisen went on to play the rest of the match, but the incident was looked at by the Match Review Panel, who charged Walker with misconduct and fined him $1,000. Walker missed the final match of the home and away season against West Coast due to a toe injury.

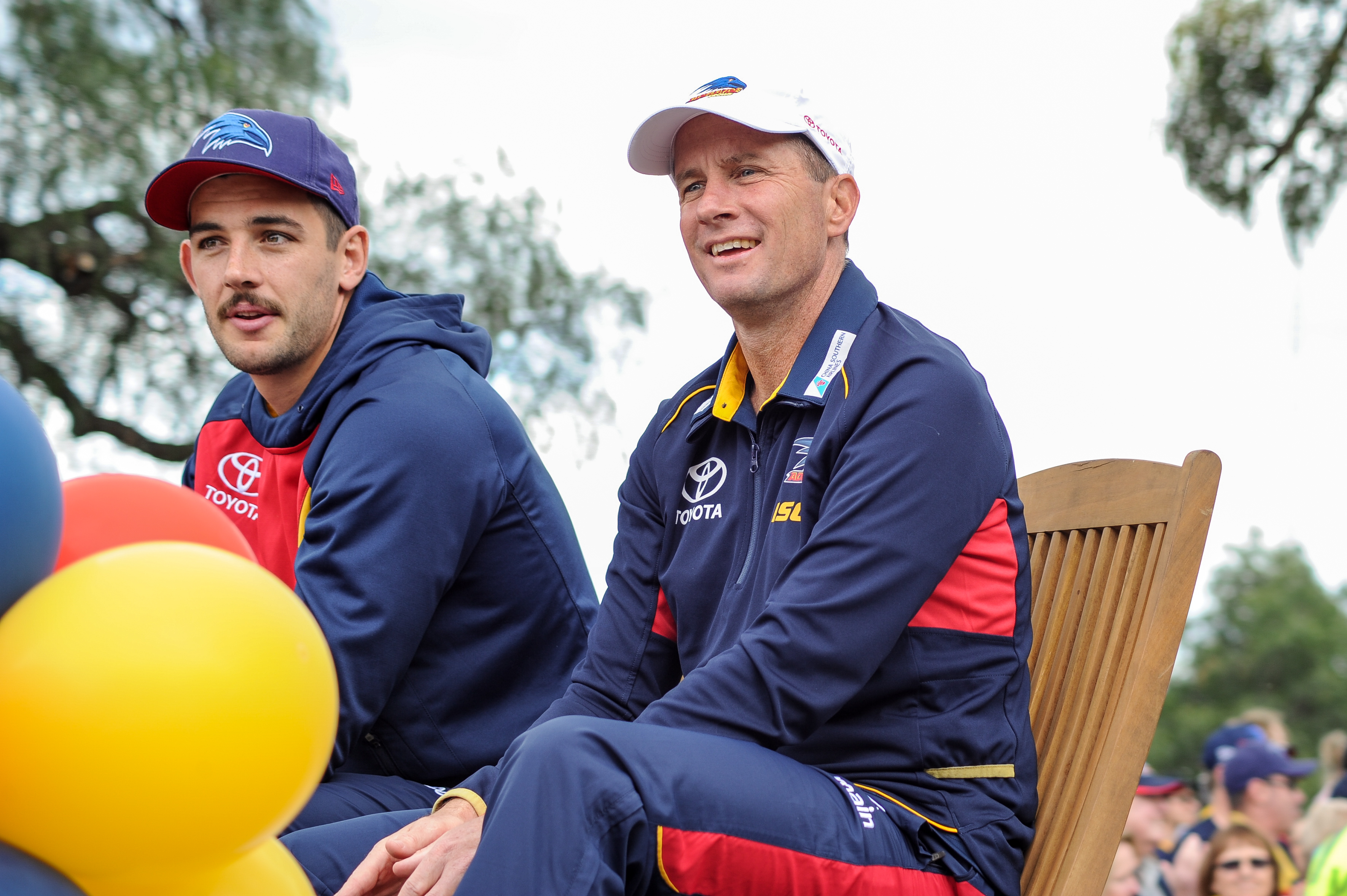
Walker and coach Don Pyke at the 2017 AFL Grand Final parade

Walker captained Adelaide in the 2017 AFL Grand Final, which they lost to Richmond by 48 points . Walker performed underwhelmingly and admitted that he was one of the players who didn’t play their role well enough. After the match he was criticised over the brevity of his post-match speech. When teammate Jake Lever requested a trade from Adelaide to Melbourne, Walker was again criticised for saying that Lever was “choosing money over success”. Weeks later Bryce Gibbs was traded to Adelaide from Carlton and Walker was accused of holding double standards, which he denied saying that Gibbs had come to Adelaide to spend time with family and accepted a pay cut.

On 4 September 2019, Walker stepped down as the club's captain, following a season sharing the role with Rory Sloane. The change in captaincy coincided with a change in coaching, as Don Pyke stepped aside for Matthew Nicks.

=== Post-captaincy, racism controversy (2020–2021) ===
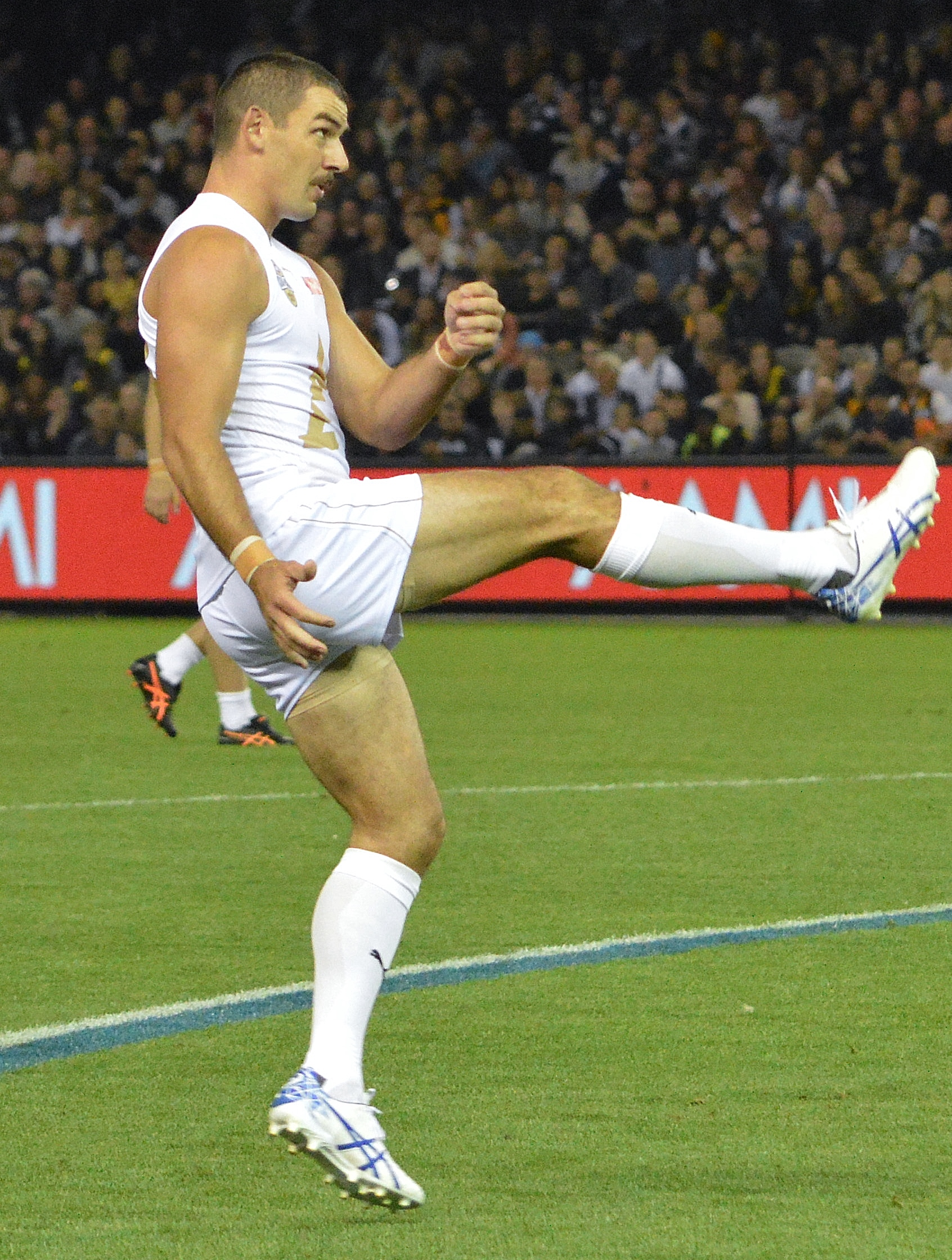
Walker kicking for goal while playing for the All-Stars

Prior to the 2020 AFL season, Walker represented the All-Stars in the State of Origin for Bushfire Relief Match, and also played for the Crows in a one-off T20 Showdown match against Port Adelaide. Both events raised funds for the recovery efforts following the bushfire season. On 19 September 2020, Walker became the all-time leading goalkicker for the Adelaide Crows. He scored his 441st goal for the club in Round 18 of the shortened 2020 season against Richmond, surpassing Tony Modra's previous record of 440. He was also Adelaide's leading goalkicker for the COVID-shortened 2020 season, scoring 15 goals; this was the lowest tally for any club's highest scorer since Jack James totalled 13 goals for St Kilda in the 1920 season (exactly 100 years prior).

Walker started the 2021 season in resurgent form, kicking 17 goals in his first three games and beating his 2020 tally in the process, finishing the year with 48 goals, his highest return since 2017. He joined Jonathan Brown as the second AFL player since 1993 to kick five or more goals in each of the first three rounds of a season. He was widely lauded for returning to near career-best form in 2021, after a disappointing 2020 season where many commentators were questioning his future in the game. His return to form was highlighted with a match-winning goal against the previously unbeaten Melbourne in round 10, resulting in a one-point victory labelled as the "upset of the season".

Before the Round 21 Showdown match with Port Adelaide, news broke of Walker having made a racist comment about North Adelaide SANFL player Robbie Young. After an AFL investigation, Walker was suspended for six matches. He was also ordered to donate $20,000 to a South Australian Indigenous program, undergo a racial sensitivity education program, and apologise to all Adelaide and North Adelaide players. Walker made an apology video over the incident with Young in frame. Young accepted Walker's apology in the ABC interview, although the apology was criticised by some Indigenous leaders in the AFL community.

=== All-Australian recognition and Coleman contention (2022–2024) ===
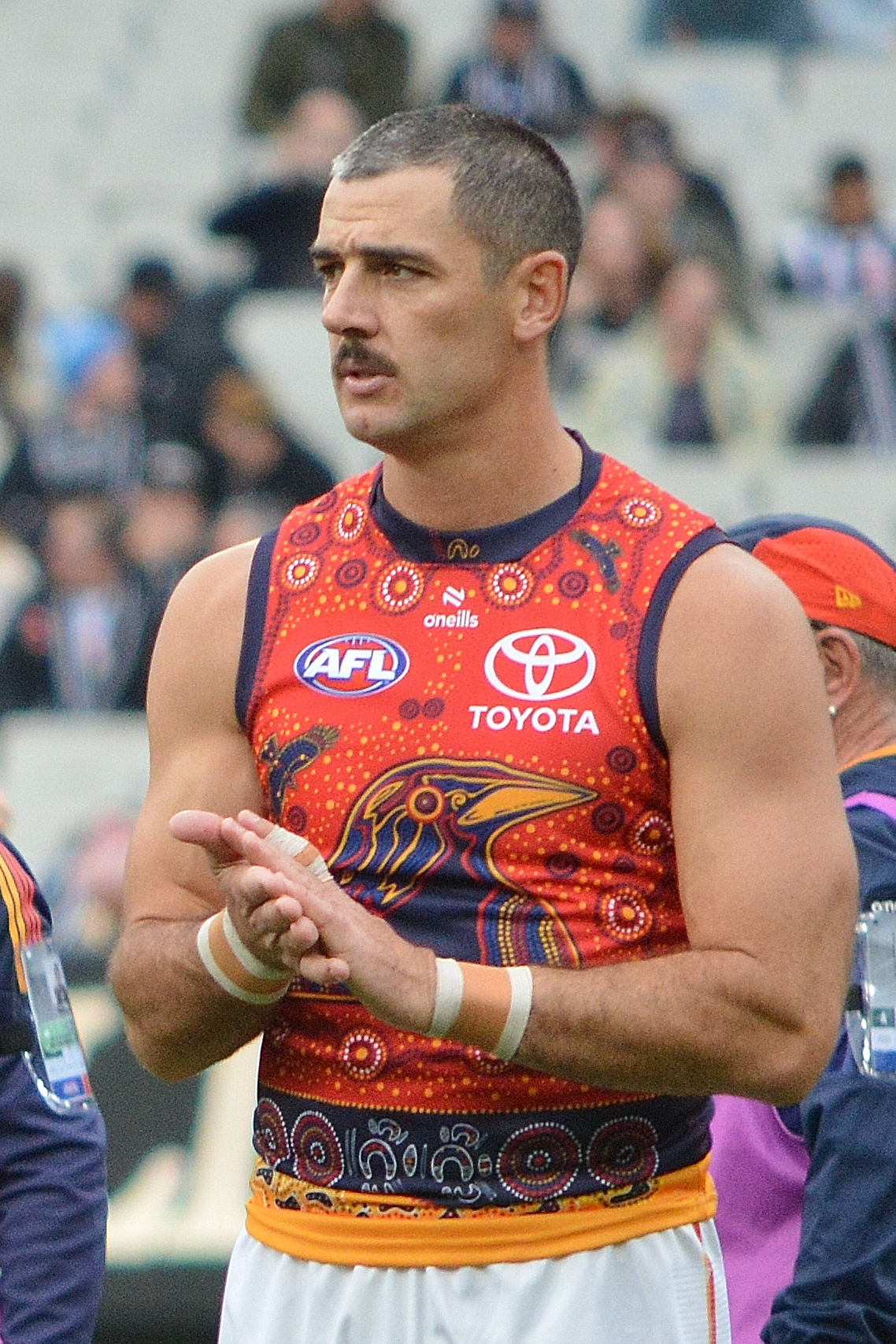
Walker during a match against Collingwood in 2025

Walker had another outstanding season in 2022, being Adelaide's leading goalkicker for a record sixth time with 47 goals for the year, breaking the record set by Tony Modra in 1997, the year Adelaide won the premiership. Walker kicked four goals in his return game from suspension against Essendon in Round 4. He kicked bags of five goals against Richmond in Round 5 and Collingwood in Round 18, as well as a bag of six against North Melbourne in Round 15. Walker was named in the All Australian squad of 40, but did not make the final team.

Walker had a somewhat quiet start to the 2023 season, kicking only three goals in the first three games. He returned to form in Round 4, kicking four goals against Fremantle. In his 250th match in Round 13, 2023, Walker would go on to kick a career-high 10 goals against an undermanned West Coast side, crushing his previous personal best of seven goals against the Brisbane Lions in 2015. In Showdown LIV in Round 20, Walker was awarded the Showdown Medal after a major seven goal haul. After kicking another nine goals against West Coast in the final round of the season, Walker temporarily led the Coleman Medal tally until Charlie Curnow kicked three goals in Carlton's final game to take the medal from Taylor Walker. Regardless, Walker's final tally of 76 goals in a season is the most of any Crow since Tony Modra in 1997, when he won the Coleman Medal. Walker capped off his career-best season with his first selection in the All-Australian team and a personal-best 16 Brownlow votes.

Walker missed the first game of the 2024 season against Gold Coast due to injury. In round 8, Walker kicked two goals to overtake Brendan Fevola in the all-time goalkicking category, totalling 624 goals and sitting in 33rd place. Following five consecutive leading goalkicker awards at Adelaide, Walker's forward dominance was finally relinquished by the rise of young Darcy Fogarty in 2024. Following the conclusion of Adelaide's season, the out-of-contract Walker signed on for another year, despite rumours that he could finish his career at a rival club. Greater Western Sydney free agent Isaac Cumming chose Adelaide as his club of destination in the off-season, citing Walker as an influence due to their shared Broken Hill roots.

=== Late career (2025–present) ===
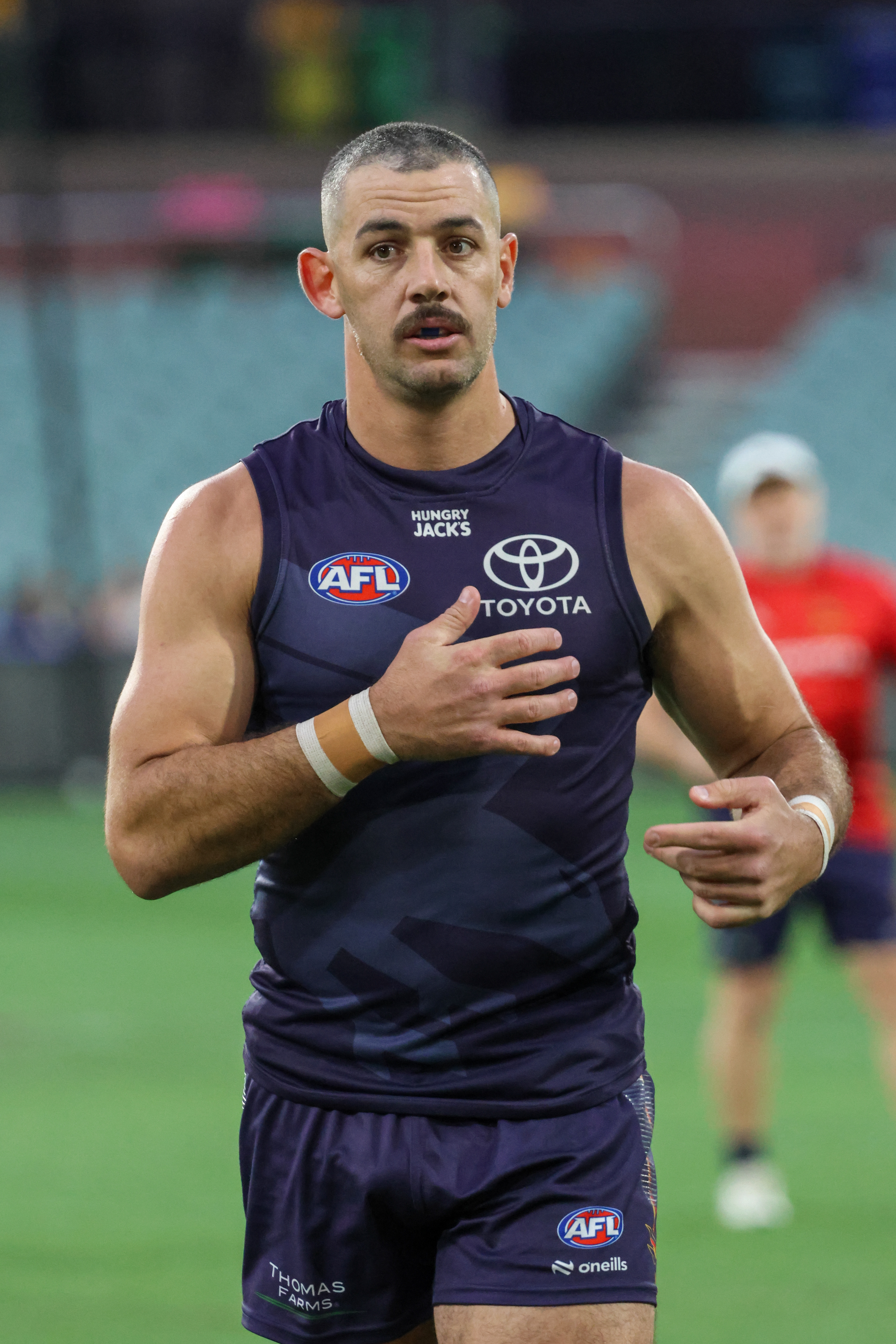
Walker training at Adelaide Oval in July 2026

In 2025, the Crows won the minor premiership for the first time since 2017. Walker kicked 39 goals from 23 appearances, including Adelaide's first in a finals match since Charlie Cameron in the 2017 Grand Final, but the Crows would go on to bow out of the finals series with consecutive losses at home. The qualifying final against Collingwood was also Walker's 300th AFL match.

Walker returned to form in the 2026 clash against St Kilda. His match winning performance, which included his first five-goal haul since 2023, was rewarded with a perfect ten coaches' votes and came a week before his 36th birthday. That week, Walker broke the record for the most goals kicked in VFL/AFL history outside of Victoria. Early in the round eight Showdown, Walker strained his hamstring, ruling him out of the match and the following few weeks. He returned through the reserves, making his first SANFL appearance since 2014, and kicked five goals to go with a mark of the year contender against Glenelg. After going goalless in his previous two matches, Walker kicked five goals in round 18 against Gold Coast. He rued missed chances, kicking 5.4 on the night to fall just one short of a 700-goal career milestone. He notched up his 700th goal against Collingwood in round 20, becoming just the 28th player in VFL/AFL history to do so.

In August 2026, Walker announced he would be retiring at the end of the 2026 season. His career was celebrated by the club in the round 24 clash against Greater Western Sydney, which was his last regular season home game. Walker farewelled more than 52,000 fans by kicking six goals in an "emotional" night on the eve of the finals series.

== Statistics ==
Legend
G	Goals	K	Kicks	D	Disposals	T	Tackles
B	Behinds	H	Handballs	M	Marks

Season	Team	No.	Games	Totals							Averages (per game)							Votes
Season	Team	No.	Games	G	B	K	H	D	M	T	G	B	K	H	D	M	T	Votes
2009	Adelaide	13	14	23	19	88	22	110	57	25	1.6	1.4	6.3	1.6	7.9	4.1	1.8	1
2010	Adelaide	13	18	35	28	144	69	213	84	30	1.9	1.6	8.0	3.8	11.8	4.7	1.7	1
2011	Adelaide	13	13	32	13	85	61	146	61	9	2.5	1.0	6.5	4.7	11.2	4.7	0.7	0
2012	Adelaide	13	19	63	35	191	82	273	128	28	3.3	1.8	10.1	4.3	14.4	6.7	1.5	7
2013	Adelaide	13	5	10	6	40	21	61	23	8	2.0	1.2	8.0	4.2	12.2	4.6	1.6	0
2014	Adelaide	13	15	34	22	138	82	220	84	24	2.3	1.5	9.2	5.5	14.7	5.6	1.6	5
2015	Adelaide	13	23	59	45	253	73	326	171	31	2.6	2.0	11.0	3.2	14.2	7.4	1.3	10
2016	Adelaide	13	23	47	37	235	97	332	155	34	2.0	1.6	10.2	4.2	14.4	6.7	1.5	6
2017	Adelaide	13	23	54	35	236	105	341	146	44	2.3	1.5	10.3	4.6	14.8	6.3	1.9	7
2018	Adelaide	13	14	26	17	106	55	161	59	30	1.9	1.2	7.6	3.9	11.5	4.2	2.1	5
2019	Adelaide	13	22	43	22	175	89	264	112	32	2.0	1.0	8.0	4.0	12.0	5.1	1.5	3
2020 (Note: The 2020 season was played with 17 home-and-away matches per team (down from 22) and 16-minute quarters with time on (down from 20-minute quarters with time on) due to the impact of the COVID-19 pandemic.)	Adelaide	13	14	15	9	74	31	105	36	14	1.1	0.6	5.3	2.2	7.5	2.6	1.0	0
2021	Adelaide	13	17	48	29	155	72	227	90	23	2.8	1.7	9.1	4.2	13.4	5.3	1.4	9
2022	Adelaide	13	18	47	23	168	87	255	94	36	2.6	1.3	9.3	4.8	14.2	5.2	2.0	14
2023	Adelaide	13	22	76	34	226	60	286	124	29	3.5^{†}	1.5	10.3	2.7	13.0	5.6	1.3	16
2024	Adelaide	13	18	29	20	143	49	192	100	25	1.6	1.1	7.9	2.7	10.7	5.6	1.4	0
2025	Adelaide	13	23	39	27	196	85	281	112	26	1.7	1.2	8.5	3.7	12.2	4.9	1.1	1
2026	Adelaide	13	18	35	20	140	53	193	85	21	1.9	1.1	7.8	2.9	10.7	4.7	1.2	3
Career			319	715	441	2793	1193	3986	1721	469	2.2	1.4	8.8	3.7	12.5	5.4	1.5	88

== Honours and achievements ==
Club

- AFL minor premership: (Adelaide; 2017, 2025)
- NAB Cup (Adelaide; 2012)
- McClelland Trophy (Adelaide; 2017)

Individual

- Adelaide all-time leading goalkicker (691)
- Adelaide captain: 2015–2019
- 7× Adelaide leading goalkicker: 2011, 2012, 2019–2023
- 2× AFLPA best captain: 2016, 2017
- All-Australian: 2023
- Showdown Medal: 2023
- 22under22 team: 2012
- AFL Rising Star nominee: 2009

== In the media ==
Walker has a weekly segment on Triple M Adelaide's Breakfast Radio hosted by Mark Ricciuto, Chris Dittmar, and Laura O'Callaghan.
