= List of Adelaide Football Club coaches =

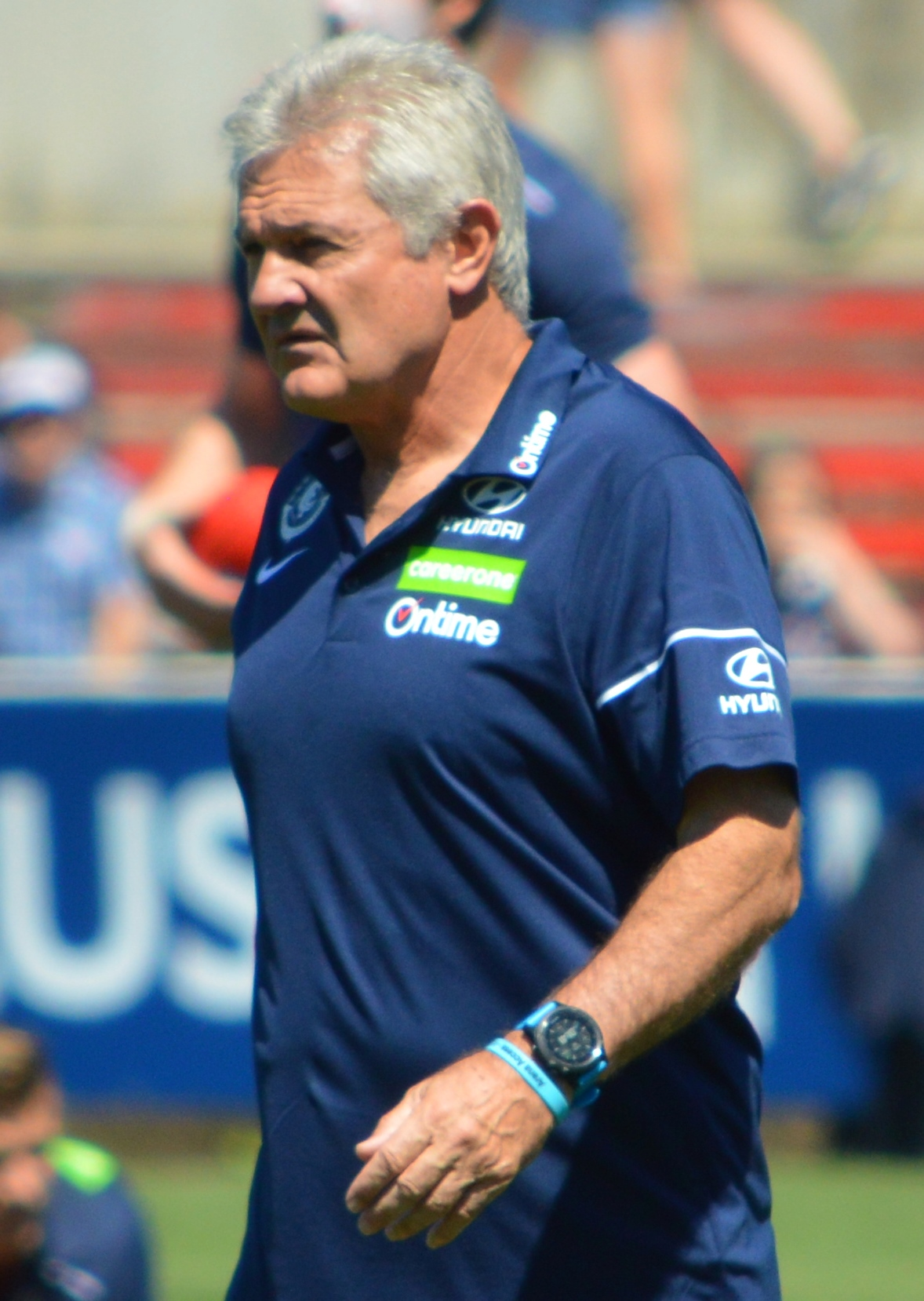
Neil Craig coached a record 166 games for the Crows.

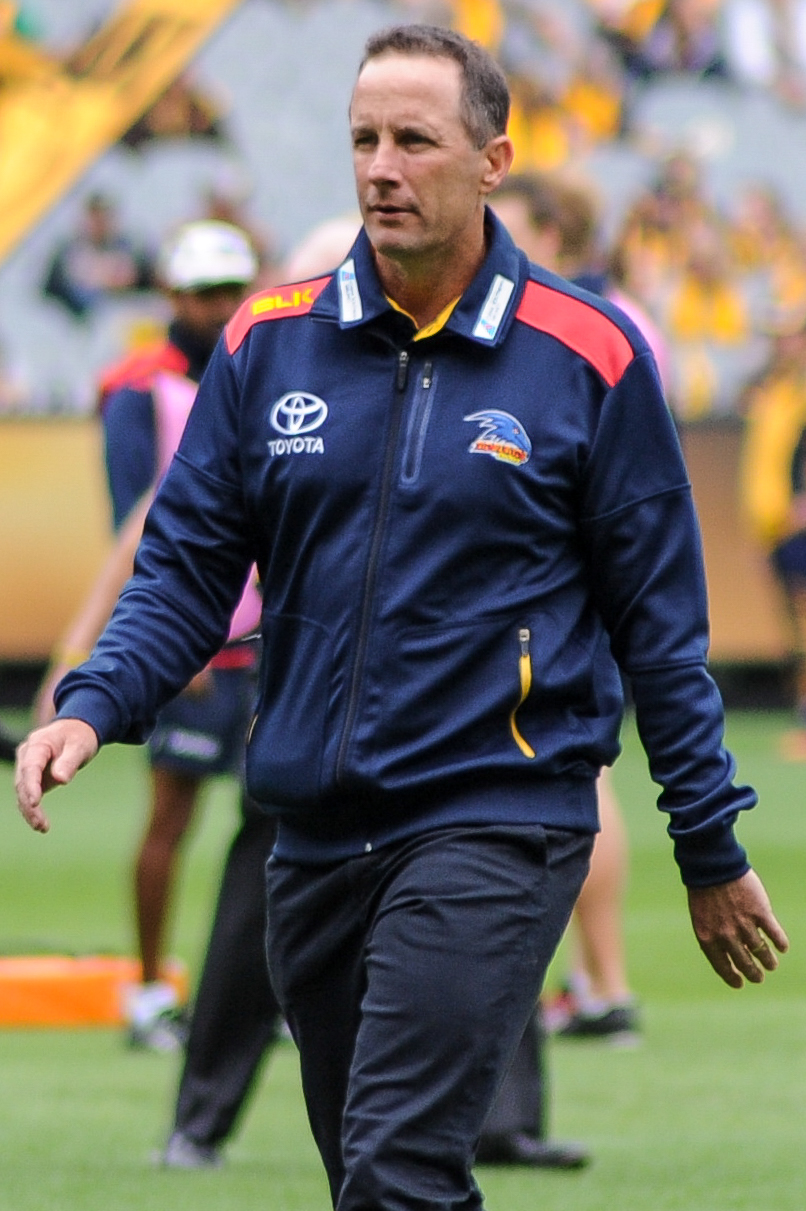
Don Pyke coached the Crows to a Grand Final.

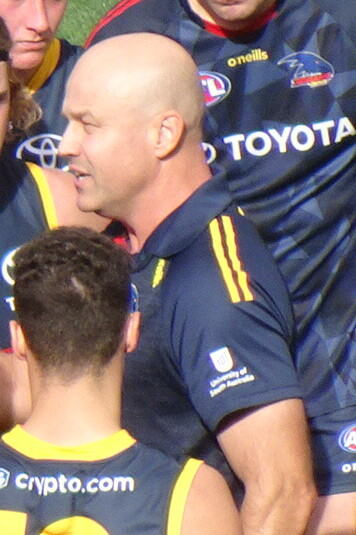
Matthew Nicks has been Adelaide's coach since 2020.

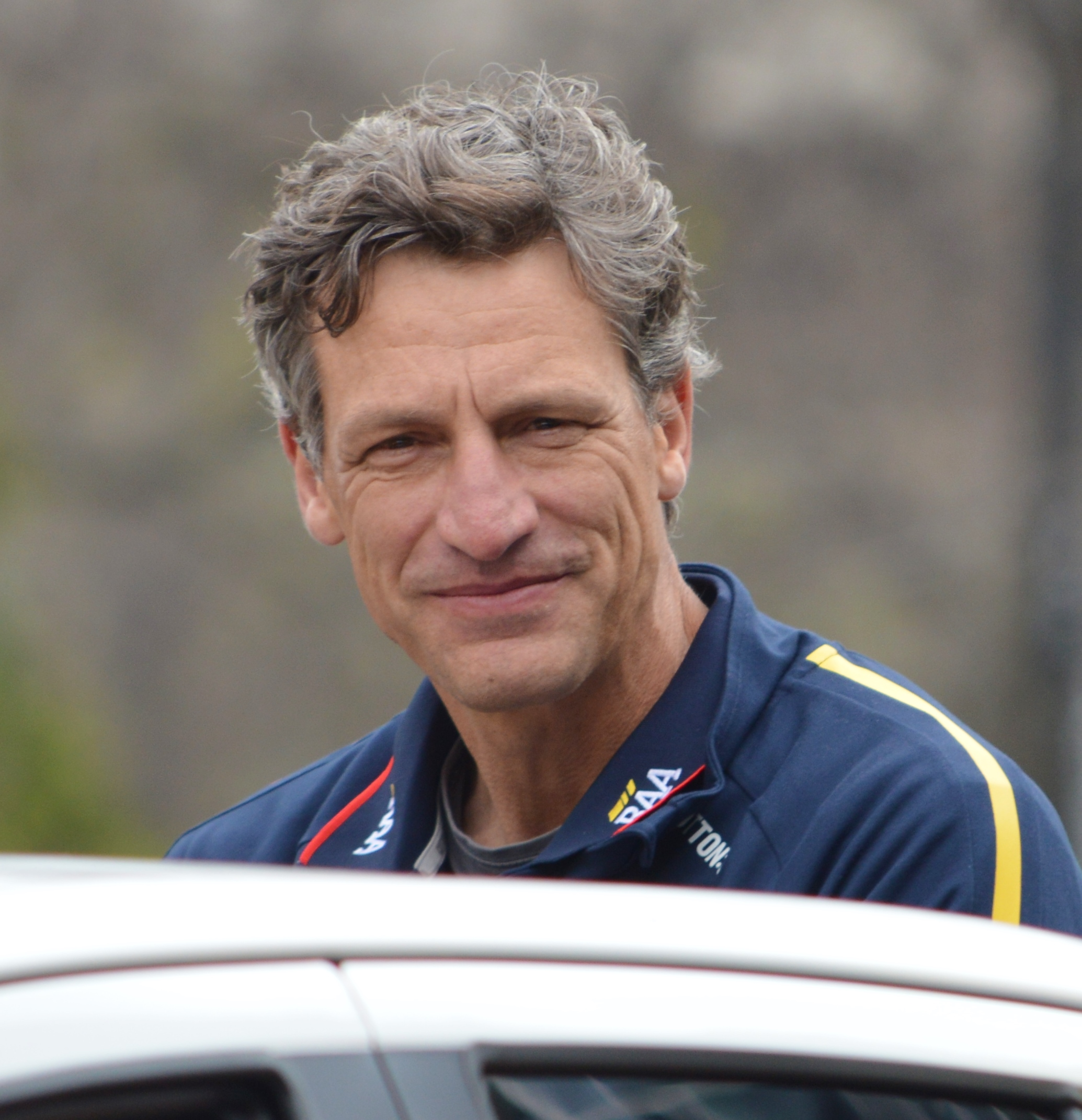
Matthew Clarke won two premierships with Adelaide's women's team.

The Adelaide Football Club is an Australian rules football club based in Adelaide, South Australia, which fields teams in the Australian Football League (AFL) and AFL Women's (AFLW). It has been in the AFL since 1991 and AFLW since 2017, and (as of 2023) has had 11 AFL coaches and two AFLW coaches.

In the AFL, two of these (Mark Bickley and Scott Camporeale) were interim coaches. Bickley coached the remainder of 2011 after the resignation of Neil Craig, and Camporeale coached the remainder of 2015 after the death of Phil Walsh. Craig was also an interim coach, after Gary Ayres resigned in 2004, but then secured the full-time role the next year. In 2022, coach Matthew Nicks missed a match due to COVID-19, and Scott Burns replaced Nicks for the match.

#	Number of coaches (Note: A running total of the number of Adelaide coaches in each league.)
GC	Games coached
W	Wins
L	Losses
D	Draws
Win%	Winning percentage

== AFL ==
Updated to the end of the 2025 season.

#	Name	Seasons	Stats					Reference
#	Name	Seasons	GC	W	L	D	W%	Reference
1	Graham Cornes	1991–1994	89	43	45	1	48.31	
2	Robert Shaw	1995–1996	44	17	27	0	38.64	
3	Malcolm Blight	1997–1999	74	41	33	0	55.41	
4	Gary Ayres	2000–2004	107	55	52	0	51.40	
5	Neil Craig	2004–2011	166	92	74	0	55.42	
6	Mark Bickley	2011	6	3	3	0	50.00	
7	Brenton Sanderson	2012–2014	69	39	30	0	56.52	
8	Phil Walsh	2015	12	7	5	0	58.33	
9	Scott Camporeale	2015	11	7	4	0	63.64	
10	Don Pyke	2016–2019	93	56	36	1	60.22	
11	Matthew Nicks	2020–present	129	55	74	1	42.64	
12	Scott Burns	2022	1	0	1	0	0.00	

== AFL Women's ==
Updated to the end of the 2025 season.

#	Name	Seasons	Stats					Reference
#	Name	Seasons	GC	W	L	D	W%	Reference
1	Bec Goddard	2017–2018	15	9	5	1	60.00	
2	Matthew Clarke	2019–2025	92	65	27	0	70.65	
3	Ryan Davis	2026–	0	0	0	0	00.00	
