= Adelaide Football Club =

Australian rules football club

Names
- Full name: Adelaide Football Club Limited, trading as Adelaide Crows
- Nickname(s): Crows; Indigenous rounds: Kuwarna
- Former nickname: Camry Crows
- Motto: We Fly As One; Made From South Australia
- Club song: "The Pride of South Australia"

2026 season
- After finals: AFL: 6th AFLW: DNQ; SANFL: DNQ
- Home-and-away season: AFL: 6th AFLW: 11th SANFL: 7th
- Leading goalkicker: AFL: Josh Rachele (42); AFLW: Caitlin Gould (10); SANFL: Blake Drury (31)
- Best and fairest: AFL: Jordan Dawson; AFLW: TBA; SANFL: Blake Drury

Club details
- Founded: 12 September 1990
- Colours: Navy blue, red, gold
- Competition: AFL: Senior men AFLW: Senior women SANFL: Reserves men
- Chairperson: John Olsen
- CEO: Tim Silvers
- Coach: AFL: Matthew Nicks; AFLW: Ryan Davis; SANFL: Michael Godden
- Captain(s): AFL: Jordan Dawson; AFLW: Ebony Marinoff; SANFL: Kieran Strachan
- Premierships: AFL (2): 1997; 1998; AFLW (3): 2017; 2019; 2022 (S6)
- Ground: AFL: Adelaide Oval (53,500); AFLW: Unley Oval (10,000)
- Former ground: AFL: Football Park (1991–2013); AFLW: Norwood Oval (2017–2025); Thebarton Oval (2017)
- Training ground: Football Park

Uniforms
Home	Clash	Gather Round

Other information
- Official website: afc.com.au

The Adelaide Football Club, nicknamed the Crows, is a professional Australian rules football club based in Adelaide, South Australia that was founded in 1990. The Crows have fielded a men's team in the Australian Football League (AFL) since 1991, and a women's team in the AFL Women's (AFLW) competition since 2017. The club's offices and training facilities are located in the western Adelaide suburb of West Lakes, at the site of the club's former home ground Football Park. Since 2014 Adelaide have played home matches at the Adelaide Oval, a 53,500-seat stadium located on the northern bank on the River Torrens in North Adelaide.

The Crows were formed in 1990 as the de facto state team representing South Australia in the AFL. They were originally owned by the South Australian National Football League (SANFL), though they gained administrative independence in 2014. They played their first season in 1991 and finished in 9th place, the highest ranking of any expansion club in the AFL in a debut year. The men's team won both the 1997 and 1998 grand finals, and have appeared in 15 finals series in their 33-year history. Adelaide is the most successful team in the AFL Women's competition, and is one of two clubs (the other being Brisbane) that have won multiple premierships; winning in 2017, 2019 and 2022 (S6). It also fields a reserves team in the South Australian National Football League (SANFL), along with the other South Australian football team in the Port Adelaide Football Club.

The men's team is currently coached by Matthew Nicks and is captained by Jordan Dawson.

== History ==
Chart of yearly ladder positions for Adelaide in AFL

=== 1990s: Foundation and back-to-back triumph ===
After the VFL was renamed the AFL for the 1990 season, the SANFL clubs unanimously resolved, in 1990, that a team would not be entered into the AFL until 1992. The AFL refused to accept this, and revised negotiations with individual clubs Port Adelaide and Norwood. Two months later, the Port Adelaide Football Club reached terms of agreement with the AFL to enter a team into its competition in season 1991. The other nine SANFL clubs reacted strongly and entered into litigation in an endeavour to halt Port's bid. As the terms offered were more favourable than previously offered, talks were resumed. On 19 September 1990, the AFL approved the bid for a new South Australian club to enter into the league rather than a single existing SANFL club.

The Adelaide Crows played their first season in the AFL in 1991. Inaugural coach Graham Cornes and captain Chris McDermott led Adelaide to a respectable ninth place out of 15 in the league, with 10 wins and 12 losses and a percentage of 89.44. Adelaide's first AFL game was against Hawthorn on Friday 22 March at their then home ground, Football Park. The Crows defeated the eventual premiers by a hefty 86-point margin, winning 24.11 (155) to 9.15 (69).

The 1992 preseason saw Nigel Smart get his feet burned in an infamous firewalking incident (that he had suggested in the first place). Smart was nicknamed "Not So" after the incident. Adelaide would again finish 9th place, this time with 11 wins and 11 losses and a percentage of 101.4.

The club reached its first finals series in the 1993 AFL season, eventually losing to Essendon in the preliminary final.

==== Premiership glory in 1997 and 1998 ====
The year 1997 marked the entry of a second South Australian club, Port Adelaide. The Crows finished fourth to qualify for its first finals series since 1993, and hosted fifth-placed West Coast in the First Elimination Final. In the first final ever to be played at Football Park, the Crows won 14.15 (99) to 9.12 (66). The next week, Adelaide benefited from the finals system in use at the time and hosted the higher ranked Geelong, who had finished two places above the Crows but were forced to play away due to losing the previous week to North Melbourne. The Crows won narrowly in a controversial match, where a clear forward 50 mark to Geelong's Leigh Colbert during a critical stage of the third quarter was not awarded by field umpire Grant Vernon, with the game concluding with the final scores as Adelaide 11.10 (76) to Geelong's 9.14 (68). This set up an away Preliminary Final against the Western Bulldogs at the MCG. Despite losing Coleman Medallist Tony Modra, who had kicked 84 goals for the season, to an ACL injury in the first quarter and trailing by 31 points at half time, the Crows kicked four unanswered goals in the last quarter to record a two-point victory, 12.21 (93) to 13.13 (91). Darren Jarman kicked a goal to put Adelaide in front with less than two minutes remaining, this qualified the Crows for their first AFL Grand Final, to be played against St Kilda at the MCG a week later.

St Kilda, chasing just their second premiership in VFL/AFL history, were warm favourites to win the Grand Final, having topped the ladder and won both of their finals by margins of 46 and 31 points, respectively, against an Adelaide side without Tony Modra, Mark Ricciuto and goalsneak Peter Vardy due to injury. However, the Crows again overcame a half-time deficit, kicking 14 second-half goals to win by 31 points, 19.11 (125) to 13.16 (94). Darren Jarman kicked six goals, five of which came in the last quarter, whilst utility Shane Ellen kicked a career-best five, while Troy Bond kicked four. Andrew McLeod, who gathered 31 possessions across half-back and in the midfield, won the Norm Smith Medal for the best player on-field in the Grand Final. The win is arguably one of the finest moments in South Australian sporting history.

Few expected the Crows to successfully defend their premiership the following year. Adelaide often struggled in close matches during the 1998 AFL season; seven of their nine losses were by 13 points or less, compared to only three wins by corresponding margins (they finished the regular season fifth on the ladder, with a record of 13–9). The Crows were well beaten by Melbourne in the qualifying final at the MCG by 48 points, and at the time, looked far from a premiership threat. Since season 2000, a loss in the finals by a team outside the top four would result in instant elimination, but the Crows benefited from a quirk in the McIntyre finals system that was in use during the 90's and still progressed to the second week, drawn to play a semi final against the Sydney Swans at the SCG. The Crows bounced back from their disappointing first finals loss and recorded a comprehensive upset 27-point win against the Swans in the wet, which set up a Preliminary Final rematch against the Western Bulldogs. Despite going into the match as underdogs, the Crows played some of their best football of the year to soundly beat the Dogs by 68 points: 24.17 (161) to 13.15 (93). It was a complete contrast to the thriller that took place the previous year, with Matthew Robran kicking six goals and Andrew McLeod, opposed to renowned tagger Tony Liberatore, booting seven.

Like the previous year, Adelaide went into the Grand Final as underdogs, playing against North Melbourne, who had won the premiership in 1996 and had won eleven consecutive matches leading up to the Grand Final. North Melbourne led by 24 points at half-time, 6.15 (51) to 4.3 (27), with only their inaccurate goalkicking keeping Adelaide in the contest. However, as they had in the previous year, Adelaide dominated the second half to win by 35 points, 15.15 (105) to 8.22 (70), the result making Adelaide the only club during the decade of the 1990s to achieve the feat of winning back-to-back AFL premierships. Darren Jarman kicked five goals, while Andrew McLeod won his second successive Norm Smith Medal, an unprecedented feat. Club legend Mark Ricciuto won the Crows' Club Champion award in 1998. Following a disappointing year in 1999, premiership coach Malcolm Blight resigned from the role, and the Crows entered the new millennium with two premierships under their belt.

=== 2000s: Finals and near misses ===
The Crows next made the finals in 2001 AFL season, though they lost their opening three matches for the season. Adelaide played fifth-placed Carlton at the MCG in the First Elimination Final and were roundly defeated, 17.16 (118) to 6.14 (50). High-profile forward Darren Jarman announced his retirement after the match. Adelaide's impressive 2002 AFL season (in which they achieved a 15–7 win–loss record) came undone at the penultimate stage, losing to Collingwood in the Preliminary Final at the MCG. Ben Hart won his second Malcolm Blight Medal in 2002, with Tyson Edwards finishing runner-up. Brett Burton led the Crows' goalkickers with 51. Hart and Mark Ricciuto were both named as All-Australians. Adelaide then exacted some revenge by defeating Collingwood in the pre-season competition in 2003, the club's first win in that competition. The Crows' impressive 2003 season was eventually halted by the Brisbane Lions at the Gabba in the semi-finals. That season, Adelaide captain Mark Ricciuto became the first and (as of 2024) only Crow to win the Brownlow Medal for the best and fairest player in the AFL in a three-way tie with Adam Goodes and Nathan Buckley. The Crows returned to finals in 2005 and recorded a famous win in what remains the only Showdown match against rivals Port Adelaide in the semi-finals. They then lost once more at the penultimate stage (preliminary final), to the West Coast Eagles at Subiaco Oval by 16 points. This was repeated in 2006 when they again lost to West Coast in the preliminary final, this time at home and by an even smaller margin of 10 points.

Adelaide would qualify for finals for each of the remaining seasons in the 2000s, falling short at the elimination or semi-final on each occasion. Collingwood proved to be the biggest hurdle, knocking the Crows out of the finals race successively in 2008 and 2009. Andrew McLeod and Bernie Vince won the club's best and fairest awards in that time.

Adelaide's finals runs in the 2000s

Year	Lost in	Opponent	Margin of defeat
2001	Elimination Final	Carlton	68 points
2002	Preliminary Final	Collingwood	28 points
2003	Semi Final	Brisbane Lions	42 points
2005	Preliminary Final	West Coast	16 points
2006	Preliminary Final	West Coast	10 points
2007	Elimination Final	Hawthorn	3 points
2008	Elimination Final	Collingwood	31 points
2009	Semi Final	Collingwood	5 points

=== 2010s: Rebuilding and tragedy ===
The Crows had their biggest rebrand in the club's history on the eve of the 2010 season, shifting their logo to an entirely new design. Adelaide had a disastrous start to the 2010 season, losing their first six matches of the home and away season. They did recover to some extent in the back half of the year, finishing 11th with nine wins and thirteen losses, the first time under coach Neil Craig that the team did not make the finals. The season marked a turning point, with the likes of McLeod, Simon Goodwin and fellow stars Brett Burton, Tyson Edwards and Trent Hentschel all announcing their retirements during the season. Long-term defender and club stalwart Nathan Bock announced he was leaving the club to join new side Gold Coast. These changes led to a disastrous 2011 campaign, which became the worst season in the club's history to that point. After a 103-point loss to fading champions St Kilda, the club's longest-serving coach Neil Craig stepped down, handing the reins to assistant coach and former premiership captain Mark Bickley as caretaker for the remainder of the season.

Under Bickley the club won three of their next four games, but lost their final two to Richmond and West Coast, finishing in 14th place with 7 wins and 15 losses. Scott Thompson won the Malcolm Blight Medal (best and fairest award) for the season. New coach Brenton Sanderson began his era at the club with a pre-season premiership in 2012 and followed up that success with an above-expectations regular season; the Crows finishing 17-5 and never once losing consecutive matches. Adelaide eventually qualified to face minor premiers Hawthorn at the MCG in the First Preliminary Final. Hawthorn led for most of the match and despite Adelaide taking the lead with five minutes remaining, the Hawks responded to win the match by five points, in yet another heart-breaking finals series loss for the Crows. Adelaide would then fall down the ladder in the following 2013 and 2014 seasons, narrowly missing the top 8 on both occasions. Failing to reach the finals led to Sanderson being sacked at the end of the 2014 season. The club would move its home matches to the newly redeveloped Adelaide Oval at the start of the 2014 season, though to this day the Crows retain their training and administrative headquarters at their old home stadium, Football Park.

==== 2012: Scandal and investigation ====
At the end of 2012, it was revealed that Adelaide had been found guilty of breaching the salary cap and tampering with the draft. As a sign of cooperation with the AFL, Adelaide forfeited themselves from the first two rounds of the 2012 draft. At a hearing at AFL House in Melbourne, both the Adelaide Crows and CEO at the time, Steven Trigg, were fined $300,000 and $50,000 respectively. The Adelaide Football Club were also suspended from participating in the first two rounds of the 2013 draft. It's widely accepted to be the league's biggest salary cap and list management scandal since Carlton in 2002.

==== 2014: Death of Dean Bailey, transfer of SANFL licence ====
In March 2014, over one week prior to the commencement of the new season, assistant coach Dean Bailey died of lung cancer, following a short illness.

On the eve of the new season, the South Australian Football Commission announced it had struck a deal with the Adelaide Football Club which required the SANFL to transfer its ownership of the Crows' licence to the club, in exchange for payments totalling $11.326 million between 2013 and 2028. The arrangement marked the first time the Adelaide Football Club had independent control of its own administration and came in conjunction with measures designed to solidify the SANFL's control of game development and the sport in South Australia.

==== 2015: Death of Phil Walsh ====
The 2015 season started incredibly successfully for the Adelaide Football Club with a 77-point win over reigning preliminary finalists North Melbourne. Newly appointed coach Phil Walsh oversaw a rapidly improving team that became known for their skilled ball use and ability to grind out wins. During the season, Adelaide was cleared of any wrongdoing by the AFL in the Eddie Betts affair, which became newsworthy following an allegation that Betts's transfer to the Crows from Carlton had been illegally signed and approved as much as 18 months prior to his move.

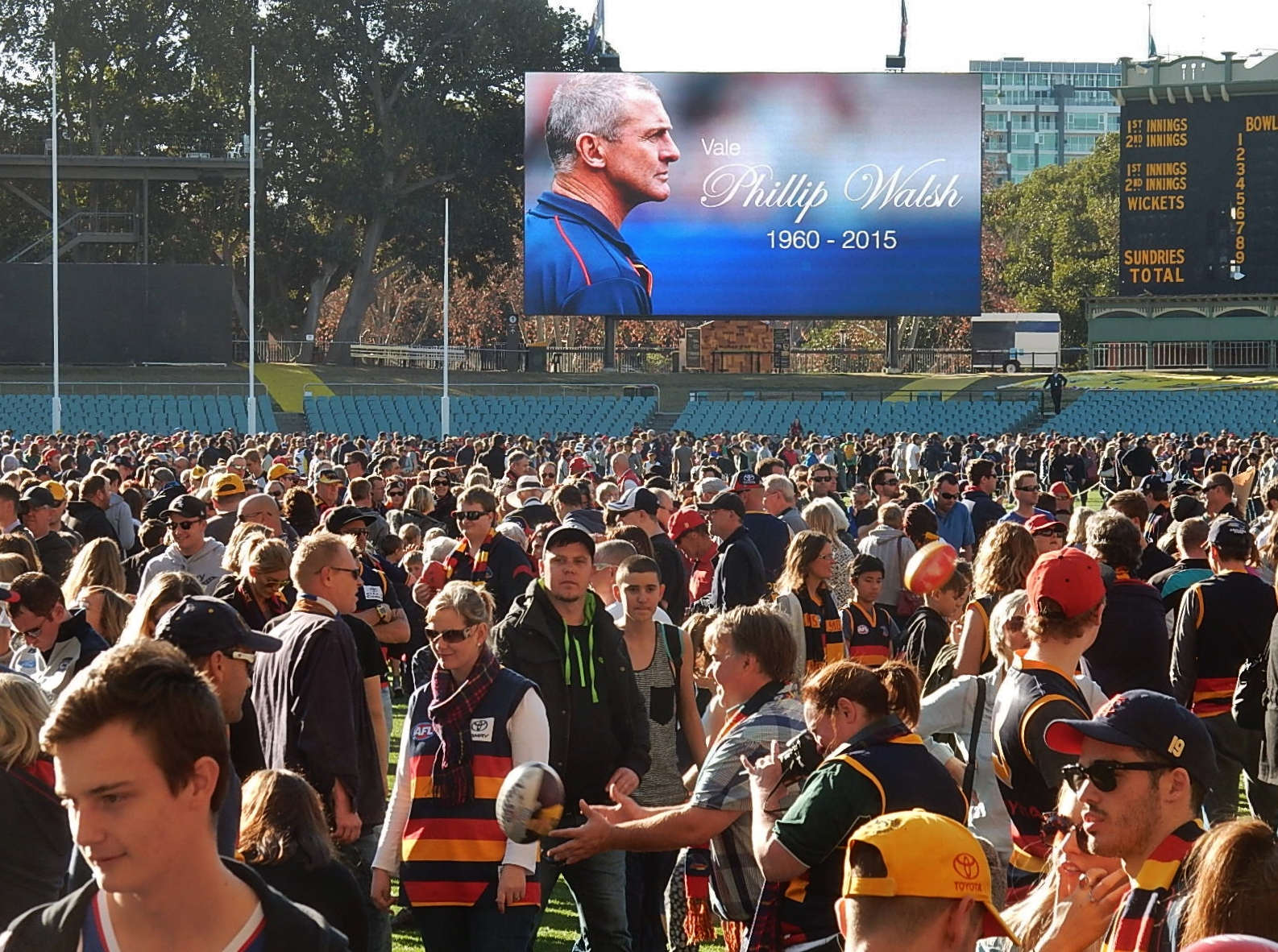
Fans gather at Adelaide Oval to pay tribute to Phil Walsh.

Tragically, on 3 July, two days prior to Adelaide's then-scheduled round 14 match against Geelong, coach Phil Walsh was stabbed to death by his son at the age of 55 in his Somerton Park home. His son Cy Walsh would later be found not guilty of murder due to mental incompetence and placed under a lifetime psychiatric supervision licence, ordering that he be detained indefinitely in a secure psychiatric facility. The tragedy was followed by an outpouring of sympathy and tributes from the club's fans and the wider AFL community. The match against the Cats was cancelled, with both teams receiving two premiership points each. Adelaide's SANFL team's match against South Adelaide, scheduled for the next day, was postponed until later in the season.

On 6 July, assistant coach Scott Camporeale was appointed interim coach for the remainder of the season, while West Coast premiership coach John Worsfold was hired as coaching director to support Camporeale. Inspiringly, the team rebounded to win six of their next seven games and qualify for the 2015 finals series, where they defeated the Western Bulldogs by seven points in a thrilling elimination final at the MCG. Their season ended when they lost to eventual premiers Hawthorn the next week.

==== 2016–2019: Don Pyke era ====
Star midfielder for many years Patrick Dangerfield left the club at the end of the 2015 season (a season in which he won the club's best and fairest) and Don Pyke, a former premiership player and assistant coach with West Coast who had also been an assistant coach at Adelaide from 2005 to 2006, was appointed Adelaide's senior coach for at least three years. Adelaide was widely tipped to slide out of the finals in 2016 but the Crows proved to be one of the successes of the season, comfortably qualifying for a home elimination final and defeating North Melbourne by 62 points, before being eliminated the next week by eventual beaten grand finalists, Sydney in the semi-finals. The club had a dominant 2017 season, winning their opening six games and never falling below second place for the entire season. Adelaide claimed their second McClelland Trophy as minor premiers. The Adelaide Crows entered the 2017 finals series as favourites for the premiership; they defeated Greater Western Sydney and Geelong by 36 and 61 points respectively to qualify for the Grand Final, their first since 1998, where they faced Richmond. Despite starting as rampaging hot favourites, the Crows lost the match by 48 points and finished runners-up for the first time in their history.

The club struggled to replicate its 2017 form in the 2018 AFL season. Prior to the season, Adelaide players went on a controversial pre-season camp that led to a decline in morale among the club's players. Adelaide struggled with injuries during the year, including Captain Taylor Walker, Rory Sloane, Brad Crouch, Tom Lynch, Rory Laird, and Richard Douglas. Combined with the loss of Cameron and Lever, the Crows struggled throughout the year but held on to win twelve games, including against 2017 Premiers Richmond and soon-to-be 2018 Premiers West Coast. The club finished 12th on the ladder with 12 wins, 10 losses, and a percentage of 104.1, and below crosstown rivals Port Adelaide who finished 10th, but with 3.5 more percentage points. This put Adelaide out of the finals for the first time since 2014. One highlight towards the end of the year was Rory Sloane who, despite rumours of a trade home to Victoria, signed a five-year contract and went on to play out his time as a one-club player.

There were lofty aspirations going into 2019, with many expecting them to play finals or even in the premiership. Despite fewer injuries, the club failed to meet these lofty expectations of finals, finishing 11th with 10 wins, 12 losses, and 100.9 percentage points. There was much media coverage given to the team throughout the season, with concerns raised about player retention and the coaching staff, especially with players like Bryce Gibbs, Josh Jenkins, and Eddie Betts dropped on and off throughout the season due to issues of form. Following the end of their season, the club began an external review of their football operations, with many musing about the future of players and coaching staff. Prior to the conclusion of the review, co-captain Taylor Walker resigned his captaincy after four years to focus on his football and family. A week later, Coach Don Pyke stepped down, a decision unrelated to the reviews that were occurring.

===== 2018 Adelaide Crows pre-season camp =====
The 2018 Adelaide Crows pre-season camp was a summer camp undertaken by players of the Adelaide Football Club from 29 January to 2 February in the lead-up to the 2018 AFL season. In Eddie Betts' biography, he released details of what happened at the camp. These revelations caused many to question what had been said to that point regarding the camp. Following the release of Eddie Betts' biography, Josh Jenkins released a statement with further details from the camp. His opposition to aspects of the camp led to him being ostracised and was the reason he left the club.

=== 2020–present: Matthew Nicks era ===
==== 2020–2021: COVID-affected seasons ====
Former Port Adelaide and Greater Western Sydney assistant coach Matthew Nicks was appointed as Adelaide's senior coach on 15 October 2019, replacing the outgoing Pyke. Under new coach Nicks, the Crows lost the first 13 matches of the coronavirus-affected 2020 AFL season and ultimately claimed their first wooden spoon in club history. However, the Crows' disastrous season did end with some optimism, as the Crows broke the drought in round 15 against Hawthorn and won three matches in a row towards the season's conclusion. The Crows received their highest-ever draft pick at the 2020 AFL draft, used to draft Riley Thilthorpe.

The Crows won their first game of the 2021 AFL season, beating the reigning Grand Finalists Geelong in an upset victory. The Crows improved slightly over their disastrous 2020 campaign, losing only one of their first four games. Walker was banned from the AFL for six games between the 2021 and 2022 AFL seasons due to racist comments directed towards Robbie Young of North Adelaide during a SANFL match. After requesting a move home to South Australia and subsequently nominating the Crows, high-value Sydney wingman Jordan Dawson was traded to Adelaide in the 2021 trade period. The trade would prove influential in Adelaide's rise out of the bottom four in 2022.

==== 2022–present: Resurgence under Nicks ====
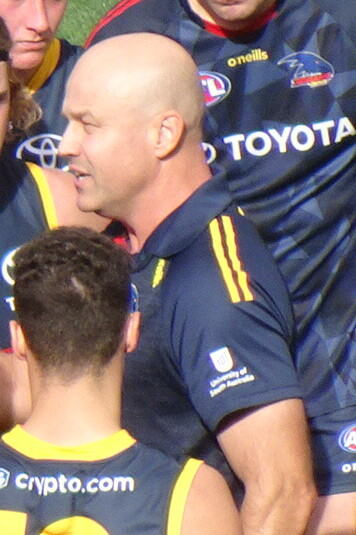
Matthew Nicks coaching in 2022.

The Crows hosted the first-ever Friday night Showdown in Round 3, and claimed one of their best-ever wins via an after-the-siren bending kick from the recruit Dawson, who received best-on-ground honours. Captain Rory Sloane ruptured his ACL in round 5. In his absence, the role of captain rotated between Reilly O'Brien, Ben Keays, Brodie Smith, and Tom Doedee for the remainder of the season. Adelaide traded in Izak Rankine at a high price, leaving them no first-round draft picks in the 2022 AFL draft until they matched the bid for Max Michalanney, son of Jim as the club's first father–son pick.

The Crows headlined the first-ever Gather Round, as they had a return to form, defeating multiple top-eight teams. Some controversial finishes, including one in round 23 against Sydney, when a Ben Keays goal was mistakenly disallowed, cost the Crows their first AFL finals series in seven years. Adelaide finished 2023 in 10th on the ladder, their best position since 2017, in part due to the leadership of their new captain Jordan Dawson. Despite high expectations, 2024 was another disappointing year for the club, with a lack of on-field performance resulting in questions being raised around Nicks' coaching, particularly amid the choice to drop young forward Josh Rachele. The club rocketed up the ladder in the 2025 season, going on a nine-game winning streak in the back half of the season to finish in first and claim the club's third minor premiership. Despite this, the Crows were eliminated from the finals series after home losses to Collingwood and Hawthorn, becoming the first minor premier to suffer a straight-sets finals exit since 1983.

Although stung by the end to their 2025 campaign, Adelaide continued their solid form into the 2026 season and would remain a premiership aspirant: finishing sixth on the ladder with a 15–8 record and avoiding a disadvantageous wildcard placing merely by percentage. The Crows won their first final since their 2017 preliminary final victory after defeating the Western Bulldogs by 22 points in the elimination final, but they would again bow out on semi final weekend after a comprehensive 53-point loss to reigning premier Brisbane. Club great Taylor Walker would retire immediately after the match, ending a 319-game career.

== Club symbols ==
=== Nickname and mascot ===
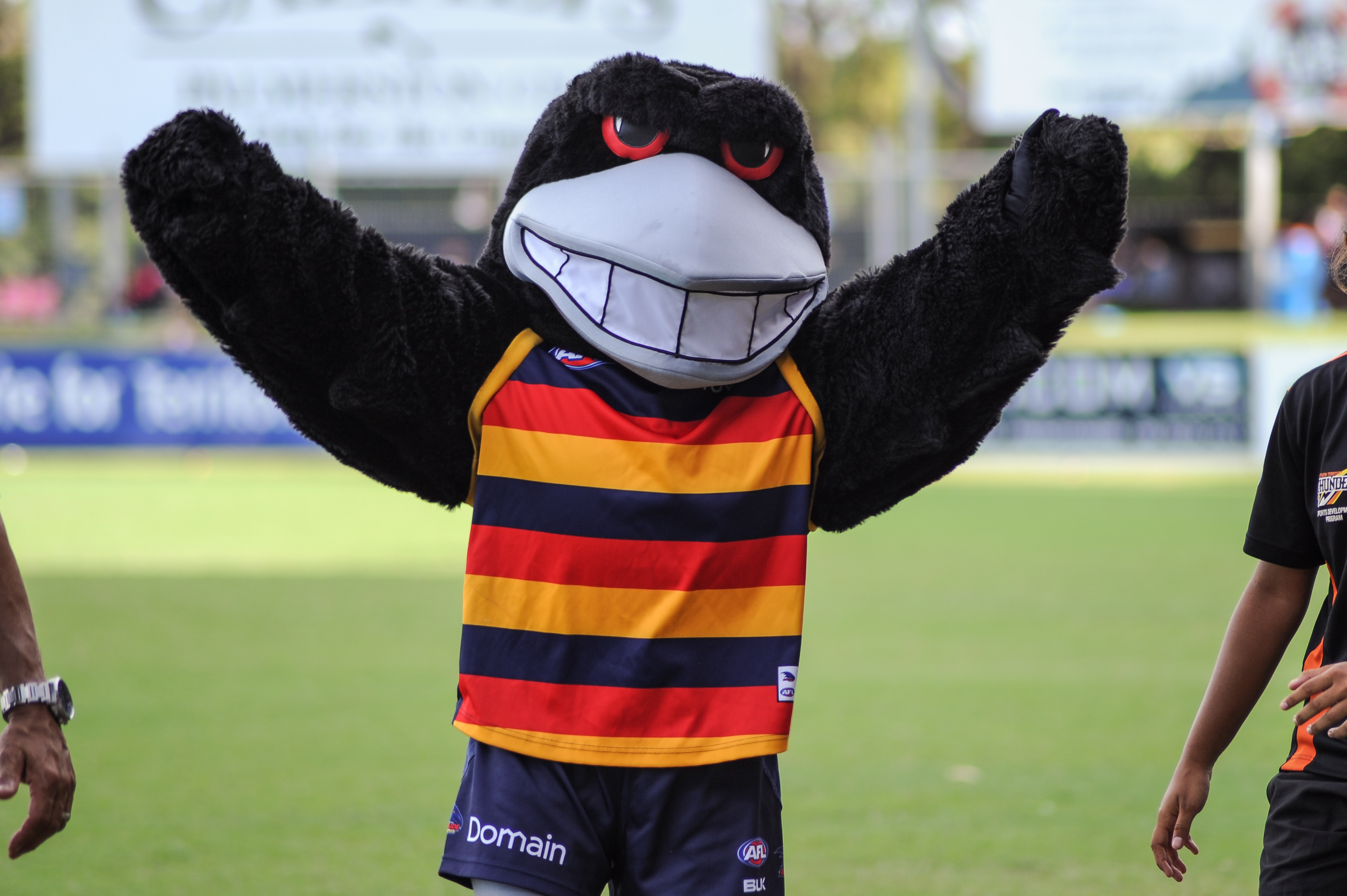
Claude "Curls" Crow, Adelaide's mascot

The club is nicknamed the Crows in reference to "croweaters", an affectionate colloquial term for South Australians.

The official club mascot, Claude "Curls" Crow, is named after South Australian football legend Neil Kerley.

=== Guernsey ===
Adelaide currently has three guernsey designs which are used in different matches throughout the season. The club's guernseys are currently supplied by Irish sportswear company O'Neills.

==== Present ====
The home guernsey features navy blue, red and gold hoops. It is worn at all matches designated as home games for the club as well as in selected away games (currently only Geelong, Port Adelaide, Western Bulldogs, and Sydney). The jumper is worn with navy shorts at all home and away games, except for away Showdowns, where it is paired with white shorts. It has had only minor variations through its history since debuting with the club in 1991, including adding a white outline to the numbers from 1996 to 2020 which has now been removed since the start of the 2021 season, and the removal of yellow cuffs and addition of navy blue panels down the sides (due to manufacturers template design) in 2006. In 2009 the yellow cuffs and full hoops returned. In 2010 the hoops were cut off again at the sides. For 2016, the club removed the side panels, returning to the full hoops of the original design. The original base design/idea has never changed in the club's 30-year history.

Adelaide's clash guernseys have historically used red or yellow bases, so that it will not clash with other team's guernseys in cases where the blue-based home guernsey is not appropriate. 2025's clash guernsey is predominantly red with singular yellow and blue stripes across the middle. Paired with white shorts, the clash guernsey features the club's new logo across the chest with a yellow outline.

The club's Indigenous guernsey has been a rotating design since it was first introduced in during the 2013 season vs. North Melbourne. The first iteration of the Adelaide Indigenous guernsey was a simple swap from Navy to Black, representing the colours in the Australian Aboriginal flag. Since 2014 however, they guernsey has featured art on a navy base from a wide number of indigenous artists and past players, such as Andrew McLeod and Ben Davis. The 2023 edition of these guernseys was the first to be shared between the women's and the men's teams.

The club wore their first commemorative ANZAC guernsey in 2024. The guernsey features the chevrons of the sergeant rank insignia of the Australian Army, and a soldier with a bugle. It marks a new design trend not before seen in Adelaide's guernseys, with chevrons used rather than the traditional hoops, and the use of a gradient. The guernsey was worn in round 7 against North Melbourne. The proceeds of the auctioned player-issue guernseys will be donated to the RSL.

==== Past ====
In previous seasons, the Crows have had variations of alternate guernseys.

The club briefly used an alternate design in the pre-season competition. It was still in the club colours, but featured the club logo prominently on the front and continuing over onto the back. This design would go on to inspire multiple clash guernseys and the Gather Round guernsey.

The away guernsey was originally intended for use in all matches designated as away games, except finals. The design had changed several times over the years since it was first used in 1999. From 2006 the red was removed from the top of the guernsey, moving it closer to the home guernsey. Its usage had waned since the introduction of the "clash" guernsey, to the point where it was only used twice in 2007, against the Western Bulldogs in round 2 and Collingwood in round 22. In a few away matches that year, the club also continued to use the traditional "home" guernsey, something which had rarely been done since the away strip was introduced. In response to this, a new away guernsey was introduced in 2008 featuring more red and yellow with a flying crow on the front – similar in design to the mid-90s pre-season jumper.

The clash guernsey was first introduced for season 2006 and was radically different from the "home" and "away" designs at the time. It was worn at all away games where the AFL deemed there to be a clash with the home team's guernsey design. Initially, the only clubs officially on the "clash list" were Carlton, Essendon, Fremantle, Melbourne and Richmond. Despite this, the AFL forced the club to wear it against other teams, such as Hawthorn and St Kilda in 2007, West Coast in 2008 and the Brisbane Lions in 2008 and 2009. Eventually, the clash jumper was required to be worn in nearly all away games.

The first clash guernsey was red, and was worn from 2006 to 2009. The club first adopted a white clash guernsey in 2010. It featured the club logo on the front with stylised curves in club colours on the front and back with navy stripes down the sides. The design continued to be changed a number of times over the years, but remained predominantly white until the end of the 2020 season.

There were yellow and red clash guernseys for 2021, before solely moving to the red guernsey for 2022 and 2023. These designs were similar to the alternative guernsey used from 2016 to 2017. In 2024, Adelaide wore a retro-style design for their clash guernsey. It features the flying crow found on the club's old logo. The crow is in blue, the above background yellow and the below background red. The design derives from the 1996 preseason design, also found in the club's away guernsey from 2008 to 2009. A key factor behind this change is the popularity for the club's Gather Round guernsey, which debuted in 2023 and featured the same crow design in a "stealth" style.

The alternative guernsey, worn in 2016 and 2017 was the same design as the white clash guernsey of the time, but with a gold base. It was worn in away games in which it provided a greater contrast with the home team than either the home or white clash guernseys. Those teams were North Melbourne, Carlton, Fremantle and Western Bulldogs football clubs. It was always worn with white shorts.

During the mid-2000s, the Crows adopted three different guernsey designs to wear during the AFL's Heritage Round. The 2004 iteration featured the tri-colour home guernsey but with the AFC crest on the chest and removal of white stroke to the numbers. All heritage guernseys featured each player's name and debut number above the manufacturer's jock tag. Controversially during the 2005 heritage round, the Crows wore an adaptation of a 1930s South Australian state guernsey, with the AFC monogram replacing the SA monogram, which prompted outrage from Port Adelaide coach Mark Williams. The club returned to a similar home design for the 2006 and 2007 Heritage Rounds, with the left panel of the guernsey featuring the colours of all SANFL clubs, before the Heritage Round was scrapped by the AFL.

=== Club song ===
The club song of the Adelaide Football Club is "The Pride of South Australia", and is sung to the tune of US Marines Hymn. The lyrics to "The Pride of South Australia" were written by the inaugural CEO Bill Sanders.

The first club song, and the song used in the club's inaugural AFL game and victory against Hawthorn, was "Here We Go Camry Crows".

=== Headquarters and training facilities ===
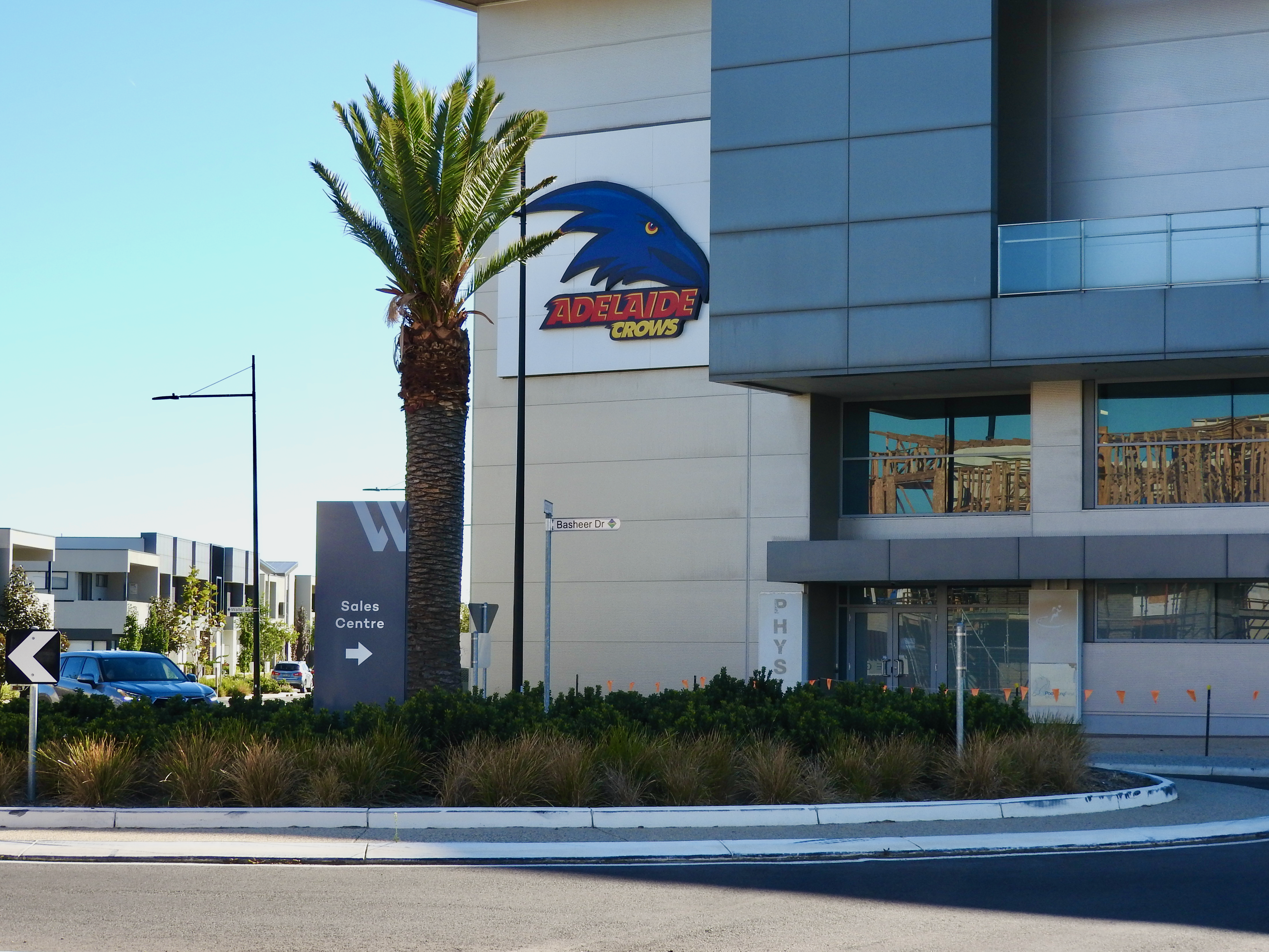
Adelaide's facilities at West Lakes

Since inception in late 1990, Adelaide's training and administrative facilities have been located at Football Park in West Lakes. The club held their first training session at the ground on 29 October 1990. Initially the club's offices were restricted to small space under the SANFL members' grandstand, before being moved to a new brick building at the southern end of the stadium in 1992. Between 1993 and 1995 a $2.3 million player and training facility was constructed behind the eastern grandstands, featuring several sports training facilities described at the time as “the best in the league”. Additional offices were constructed at the northern end of the ground, and a $21 million renovation was concluded in 2009, which featured a 2500sq metre “Shed” for gatherings of fans and members, and upgrades to the indoor training and administrative facilities. When Football Park stopped hosting premiership matches at the end of the 2013 season, the grandstands were progressively torn down and the club's game-day facilities were merged with the administration offices, whilst the general public were granted access to the oval outside of Crows' training sessions.

In 2024, following prolonged negotiations with the local council and SANFL, the Adelaide Football Club announced it would move its training and administrative headquarters to an upgraded Thebarton Oval, which will feature a 150m, two-storey wrap-around building and upgraded grandstands and new facilities for the club's AFL, AFLW and SANFL teams.

== Club teams ==
=== AFL Men’s team ===
==== Current playing list and coaching staff ====
Adelaide Football Club · AFL personnel
Playing list		Inactive list	Coaching staff
2 Ben Keays (vc); 3 Sam Berry; 4 Callum Ah Chee; 5 Sid Draper; 6 Daniel Curtin; 7 Riley Thilthorpe; 8 Josh Rachele; 9 Nick Murray; 11 Charlie Edwards; 12 Jordan Dawson (c); 14 Jake Soligo; 15 Brayden Cook; 16 Max Michalanney; 19 Zac Taylor; 20 Mitch Hinge; 21 Hugh Bond; 22 Oscar Ryan; 23 Izak Rankine; 24 Josh Worrell	25 James Peatling; 26 Mitchell Marsh; 27 Luke Nankervis; 28 Alex Neal-Bullen (vc); 29 Rory Laird; 30 Wayne Milera; 31 Billy Dowling; 32 Darcy Fogarty; 33 Indy Cotton (B); 34 Archie Ludowyke; 35 James Borlase; 36 Finnbar Maley; 39 Toby Murray; 40 Hugo Hall-Kahan (A); 42 Lachlan McAndrew (A); 43 Reilly O'Brien; 44 Isaac Cumming; 48 Mark Keane		Senior coach: Matthew Nicks; Assistant coaches: Ben Jacobs (back line); Nathan van Berlo (midfield); Matthew Wright (forward line); Sam Jacobs (ruck/stoppages); Jack Hombsch (development – back line); Andrew McPherson (development – midfield); Jarrod Lienert (development – forward line); Legend: (c) captain; (vc) vice-captain; (A) Category A rookie; (B) Category B rookie; Updated: 16 November 2026; Sources: Players (rookies); coaches

==== Season summaries ====
Adelaide AFL Honour Roll
Season	Ladder	W–L–D	Finals	Coach	Captain(s)	Club Champion	Leading goalkicker
1991	9th	10–12–0	DNQ	Graham Cornes	Chris McDermott	Mark Mickan	Rod Jameson (49)
1992	9th	11–11–0	DNQ	Graham Cornes	Chris McDermott	Chris McDermott	Scott Hodges (48)
1993	5th	12–8–0	Preliminary Finals	Graham Cornes	Chris McDermott	Tony McGuinness	Tony Modra (129)
1994	11th	9-12–1	DNQ	Graham Cornes	Chris McDermott	Shaun Rehn	Tony Modra ^{(2)} (70)
1995	11th	8–12–0	DNQ	Robert Shaw	Tony McGuinness	Matthew Connell	Tony Modra ^{(3)} (42)
1996	12th	8–14–0	DNQ	Robert Shaw	Tony McGuinness	Matthew Liptak	Tony Modra ^{(4)} (75)
1997	4th	13–9–0	Premiers	Malcolm Blight	Mark Bickley	Andrew McLeod	Tony Modra ^{(5)} (84) ✪
1998	5th	13–9–0	Premiers	Malcolm Blight	Mark Bickley	Mark Ricciuto	Darren Jarman (45)
1999	13th	8–14–0	DNQ	Malcolm Blight	Mark Bickley	Ben Hart	Darren Jarman ^{(2)} (58)
2000	11th	9–13–0	DNQ	Gary Ayres	Mark Bickley	Simon Goodwin	Scott Welsh (47)
2001	8th	12–10–0	Elimination Finals	Gary Ayres	Mark Ricciuto	Andrew McLeod ^{(2)}	Darren Jarman ^{(3)} (40)
2002	3rd	15–7–0	Preliminary Finals	Gary Ayres	Mark Ricciuto	Ben Hart ^{(2)}	Brett Burton (51)
2003	6th	13-9-0	Semi Finals	Gary Ayres	Mark Ricciuto	Mark Ricciuto ^{(2)} ★	Graham Johncock (30)
2004	12th	8–14–0	DNQ	Gary Ayres & Neil Craig	Mark Ricciuto	Mark Ricciuto ^{(3)}	Scott Welsh ^{(2)} (36)
2005	1st	17–5–0	Preliminary Finals	Neil Craig	Mark Ricciuto	Simon Goodwin ^{(2)}	Scott Welsh ^{(3)} (58)
2006	2nd	16–6–0	Preliminary Finals	Neil Craig	Mark Ricciuto	Simon Goodwin ^{(3)}	Mark Ricciuto (44)
2007	8th	12–10–0	Elimination Finals	Neil Craig	Mark Ricciuto	Andrew McLeod ^{(3)}	Scott Welsh ^{(4)} (49)
2008	5th	13–9–0	Elimination Finals	Neil Craig	Simon Goodwin	Nathan Bock	Brett Burton ^{(2)} (34)
2009	5th	14–8–0	Semi Finals	Neil Craig	Simon Goodwin	Bernie Vince	Jason Porplyzia (57)
2010	11th	9–13–0	DNQ	Neil Craig	Simon Goodwin	Richard Douglas	Kurt Tippett (46)
2011	14th	7–15–0	DNQ	Neil Craig & Mark Bickley	Nathan van Berlo	Scott Thompson	Taylor Walker (32)
2012	2nd	17–5–0	Preliminary Finals	Brenton Sanderson	Nathan van Berlo	Scott Thompson ^{(2)}	Taylor Walker ^{(2)} (63)
2013	11th	10–12–0	DNQ	Brenton Sanderson	Nathan van Berlo	Rory Sloane	Tom Lynch (63)
2014	10th	11–11–0	DNQ	Brenton Sanderson	Nathan van Berlo	Daniel Talia	Eddie Betts (51)
2015	7th	13–8–0	Semi Finals	Phil Walsh & Scott Camporeale	Taylor Walker	Patrick Dangerfield	Eddie Betts ^{(2)} (63)
2016	5th	16–6–0	Semi Finals	Don Pyke	Taylor Walker	Rory Sloane ^{(2)}	Eddie Betts ^{(3)} (75)
2017	1st	15–6–1	Runners-Up	Don Pyke	Taylor Walker	Matt Crouch	Eddie Betts ^{(4)} (55)
2018	12th	12–10–0	DNQ	Don Pyke	Taylor Walker	Rory Laird	Josh Jenkins (46)
2019	11th	10–12–0	DNQ	Don Pyke	Taylor Walker & Rory Sloane	Brad Crouch	Taylor Walker ^{(3)} (43)
2020	18th	3–14–0	DNQ	Matthew Nicks	Rory Sloane	Reilly O'Brien	Taylor Walker ^{(4)} (15)
2021	15th	7–15–0	DNQ	Matthew Nicks	Rory Sloane	Rory Laird ^{(2)}	Taylor Walker ^{(5)} (48)
2022	14th	8–14–0	DNQ	Matthew Nicks	Rory Sloane	Rory Laird ^{(3)}	Taylor Walker ^{(6)} (47)
2023	10th	11–12–0	DNQ	Matthew Nicks	Jordan Dawson	Jordan Dawson	Taylor Walker ^{(7)} (76)
2024	15th	8–14–1	DNQ	Matthew Nicks	Jordan Dawson	Jordan Dawson^{(2)} & Ben Keays	Darcy Fogarty (41)
2025	1st	18–5–0	Semi Finals	Matthew Nicks	Jordan Dawson	Jordan Dawson ^{(3)}	Riley Thilthorpe (60)
2026	6th	15–8–0	Semi Finals	Matthew Nicks	Jordan Dawson	Jordan Dawson ^{(4)}	Josh Rachele (42)
★ = Brownlow Medallist / ✪ = Coleman Medallist / ^{(x)} = Multiple Best & Fairest or Leading Goal Kicker

=== AFL Women's team ===
Adelaide players celebrate a goal against Hawthorn in 2026

The Adelaide AFLW team is the club's women's team in the AFL Women's league. A founding member of the AFLW, the football club launched a bid to enter a team in the 2017 AFL Women's season in April 2016. The bid was constructed in partnership with AFL Northern Territory, with the club to share resources and facilities between its Adelaide base and AFLNT's Darwin location. The bid became a success in June of that year when the league announced they had been awarded one of eight inaugural licences.

Under inaugural coach Bec Goddard, the team won the first ever AFLW premiership in 2017. The season was also a highlight for individual success, with co-captain Erin Phillips winning the league most valuable player and best on ground in the grand final. Missing the finals in 2018, Goddard quit as coach and was replaced by Matthew Clarke for the 2019 season. Winning six out of the seven home-and-away games, the club returned to finals and won its second premiership with a 45-point win against Carlton. Erin Phillips repeated her individual success by winning the league MVP for the second time and the grand final best on ground despite leaving the ground injured in the third quarter. It was announced in August 2019 that the partnership between Adelaide and AFLNT would not continue. During the COVID-19-interrupted 2020 season, the Crows slumped to only two wins and failed to reach the finals. The club quickly rose back up the following year and won seven of nine home-and-away matches, and they claimed the minor premiership for the 2021 season before going down to Brisbane by 18 points in the 2021 grand final. Adelaide bounced back the next year to win the 2022 AFL Women's season 6 Grand Final by 13 points, earning their third premiership, the most of any club in the league.

In 2022, AFL rivals Port Adelaide were introduced into the women's competition. The two teams met in the first-ever AFLW Showdown on the 30th of September. The occasion drew in a crowd of 20,652 at Adelaide Oval, which was the highest attendance for any game in 2022 season 7. Following their historic back-to-back premierships, Adelaide had consecutive preliminary final exits in season 7 and 2023, with loses to eventual runners-up Brisbane and North Melbourne respectively. Despite this, Adelaide finished 1st in the 2023 home-and-away season, becoming the first team to achieve this on four occasions. Ebony Marinoff and Sarah Allan became the club's new co-captains in 2024. Another top-four finish ended in a bittersweet manner, as the Crows lost to both eventual grand finalists Brisbane and North Melbourne, but Marinoff was crowned the league's best and fairest.

==== Current playing list and coaching staff ====
Adelaide Football Club · AFL Women's personnel
Playing list		Inactive list	Coaching staff
1 Caitlin Gould; 2 Eloise Jones (vc); 3 Grace Egan; 4 Lily Tarlinton; 5 Chloe Bown; 6 Hannah Munyard; 7 Keeley Kustermann; 8 India Rasheed; 10 Ebony Marinoff (c); 11 Sarah Goodwin; 12 Chelsea Biddell; 14 Ava Stewart; 15 Danielle Ponter; 17 Maddi Newman; 19 Christina Leuzzi*	20 Grace Kelly; 21 Lucy Waye; 22 Kayleigh Cronin*; 23 Niamh Kelly; 24 Amy Boyle-Carr*; 25 Teah Charlton; 27 Alicia Blizard; 28 Brooke Tonon; 30 Juliet Kelly; 31 Alice Tentye; 32 Jess Allan; 33 Olivia Gorman; 34 Jemmika Douglas; 39 Sarah Allan		Senior coach: Ryan Davis; Assistant coaches: Courtney Cramey (back line); Kieran Strachan (midfield); Marijana Randall (forward line); Emma Sampson (development); Legend: (c) captain; (vc) vice-captain; * rookie; Updated: 16 November 2026; Sources: Players, coaches

==== Season summaries ====
Adelaide AFLW Honour Roll
Season	Ladder	W–L–D	Finals	Coach	Captain(s)	Club Champion	Leading goalkicker
2017	2nd	5–2–0	Premiers	Bec Goddard	Erin Phillips & Chelsea Randall	Erin Phillips ★	Sarah Perkins (11)
2018	5th	3–3–1	DNQ	Bec Goddard	Erin Phillips & Chelsea Randall	Chelsea Randall	Erin Phillips & Ruth Wallace (7)
2019	1st ^	6–1–0	Premiers	Matthew Clarke	Erin Phillips & Chelsea Randall	Erin Phillips ^{(2)} ★	Stevie-Lee Thompson (14) ✪
2020	11th ^	2–4–0	DNQ	Matthew Clarke	Erin Phillips & Chelsea Randall	Anne Hatchard	Danielle Ponter (5)
2021	1st	7–2–0	Runners-up	Matthew Clarke	Chelsea Randall	Ebony Marinoff	Erin Phillips ^{(2)} (14)
2022 (S6)	1st	9–1–0	Premiers	Matthew Clarke	Chelsea Randall	Anne Hatchard ^{(2)}	Ashleigh Woodland (21) ✪
2022 (S7)	3rd	8–2–0	Preliminary Finals	Matthew Clarke	Chelsea Randall	Anne Hatchard ^{(3)}	Ashleigh Woodland ^{(2)} (14)
2023	1st	9–1–0	Preliminary Finals	Matthew Clarke	Chelsea Randall	Ebony Marinoff ^{(2)}	Danielle Ponter ^{(2)} (20)
2024	4th	8–3–0	Preliminary Finals	Matthew Clarke	Sarah Allan & Ebony Marinoff	Ebony Marinoff ^{(3)} ★	Caitlin Gould (20)
2025	6th	7–5–0	Semi Finals	Matthew Clarke	Sarah Allan & Ebony Marinoff	Ebony Marinoff ^{(4)}	Eloise Jones (15)
2026	11th	5–7–0	DNQ	Ryan Davis	Ebony Marinoff	TBA	Caitlin Gould ^{(2)} (10)
★ = AFLW Best & Fairest award / ✪ = AFLW Leading Goalkicker award / ^{(x)} = Multiple Club Champion or Leading Goal Kicker

^ Denotes the ladder was split into two conferences. Figure refers to the club's overall finishing position in the home-and-away season.

=== SANFL team ===
The Adelaide Crows were granted a licence to field a stand-alone reserves men's team in the South Australian National Football League (SANFL) in 2014. Prior to this date AFL-listed players at the club were drafted to SANFL clubs, and would play for them when not selected for the AFL team. A fairly unsuccessful history thus far, the Crows finished last in 2018 but have appeared in four preliminary finals. Ruckman Kieran Strachan has won the most best and fairest awards, with three to his name.

== Rivalries ==
Adelaide has a fierce rivalry with fellow South Australian AFL team Port Adelaide. Matches between the two teams are known as the Showdown. The Showdown rivalry significantly draws upon the bitter, winner take all, competition for the two South Australian licences to join the AFL in the 1980s and early 1990s. The Showdown is often considered the best, and most bitter, in the Australian Football League with Malcolm Blight, Australian Football Hall of Fame Legend, stating in 2009 that "there is no doubt it is the greatest rivalry in football".

== Membership base and sponsorship ==
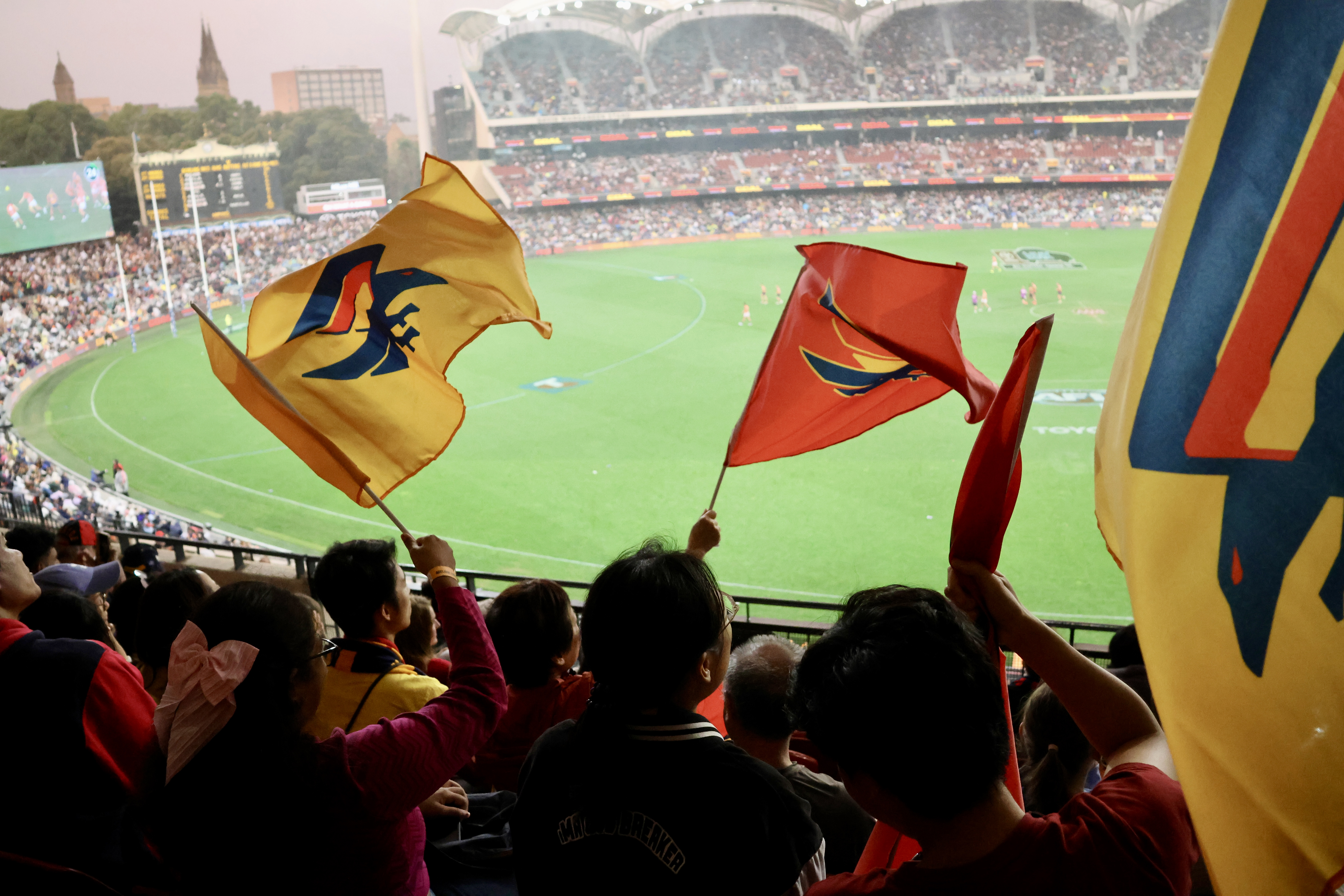
Adelaide supporters at a home ground match

In 2006, the club made history becoming the first club in VFL/AFL history to have more than 50,000 members (with 50,138). They broke that record in 2007, signing up 50,146 members after only round one of the season. The club failed to continue this record run and subsequently signed 48,720 members in 2008, barely maintaining their pole position, before slipping to 45,515 in 2010; however, the trend reversed and later breached all-time highs in 2014 when they signed 54,249, although five other clubs had surpassed their membership base by this point, with Collingwood leading with nearly 80,000 members by this point. Adelaide's membership peaked for the 2019 season with 64,437, and their 2022 membership was 63,009.

The club has enjoyed a long-standing partnership with Toyota since its inception, leading the club to be known in promotional materials as the "Camry Crows".

Two-time Grand Slam tennis champion Lleyton Hewitt was made the club's number-one ticket holder in December 2002. International pop singer Guy Sebastian became the number-one ticket holder in April 2024. Former federal politician Kate Ellis is the number-one female ticket holder, while Greg Champion, a musician and radio broadcaster, is the Melbourne number-one ticket holder. Australian golfer Adam Scott is also an honorary member of the club.

=== Season figures ===
Year	Membership		AFL				AFL Women's			
Year	Membership		Ladder finish		Average home crowd		Ladder finish		Average home crowd	
Year	Figure	Change	H&A	Finals	Figure	Change	H&A	Finals	Figure	Change
1991	25,087	—N/a	9th	—	40,479	—N/a				
1992	38,673	▲	9th	—	38,275	▼				
1993	40,100	▲	5th	3rd	46,128	▲				
1994	40,611	▲	11th	—	42,864	▼				
1995	41,654	▲	11th	—	38,552	▼				
1996	42,283	▲	12th	—	39,428	▲				
1997	41,395	▼	4th	Premiers	40,116	▲				
1998	41,985	▲	5th	Premiers	41,203	▲				
1999	42,120	▲	13th	—	39,386	▼				
2000	42,896	▲	11th	—	38,447	▼				
2001	42,014	▼	8th	8th	39,627	▲				
2002	46,620	▲	3rd	4th	43,068	▲				
2003	47,097	▲	6th	5th	44,524	▲				
2004	45,642	▼	12th	—	39,879	▼				
2005	43,256	▼	1st	3rd	42,336	▲				
2006	50,138	▲	2nd	3rd	42,329	▼				
2007	50,976	▲	8th	8th	42,042	▼				
2008	48,720	▼	5th	7th	40,678	▼				
2009	46,472	▼	5th	5th	38,801	▼				
2010	45,545	▼	11th	—	35,773	▼				
2011	46,520	▲	14th	—	35,020	▼				
2012	45,105	▼	2nd	3rd	36,829	▲				
2013	46,405	▲	11th	—	33,703	▼				
2014	54,249	▲	10th	—	48,046	▲				
2015	52,920	▼	7th	6th	46,487	▼				
2016	54,307	▲	5th	6th	47,056	▲				
2017	56,865	▲	1st	Runners-up	47,675	▲	2nd	Premiers	8,876	—N/a
2018	64,739	▲	12th	—	45,417	▼	5th	—	6,037	▼
2019	64,437	▼	11th	—	44,514	▼	1st (A) (Note: For the 2019 season, the AFLW was split into two conferences with separate ladders. Adelaide was in conference A. Had the ladders been combined, Adelaide would have finished 1st of 10 teams.)	Premiers	14,698	▲
2020	54,891	▼	18th	—	10,927 (Note: Average home crowd for 2020 taken from the nine home games played with limited crowds due to the COVID-19 pandemic.)	▼	6th (A) (Note: For the 2020 season, the AFLW was split into two conferences with separate ladders. Adelaide was in conference A. Had the ladders been combined, Adelaide would have finished 11th of 14 teams.)	—	6,857 (Note: Average home crowd for 2020 taken from the two home games played with limited crowds due to the COVID-19 pandemic.)	▼
2021	60,232	▲	15th	—	24,786	▲	1st	Runners-up	5,811	▼
2022	63,099	▲	14th	—	31,429	▲	1st (Note: There were two AFLW seasons held in 2022. The first set of statistics given here are for 2022 season 6, and the second are for 2022 season 7.)	Premiers	4,731	▼
2022	63,099	▲	14th	—	31,429	▲	3rd	3rd	2,529	▼
2023	68,536	▲	10th	—	39,376	▲	1st	3rd	4,181	▲
2024	75,477	▲	15th	—	41,421	▲	4th	3rd	2,720	▼
2025	81,067	▲	1st	5th	45,553	▲	6th	5th	2,805	▲
2026	86,307	▲	6th	6th	46,771	▲	11th	—		

=== Sponsorship ===
==== AFL ====
Year	Kit manufacturer	Major sponsor	Shorts sponsor	Bottom rear sponsor	Top rear sponsor	Collar sponsor
1991–93	Sekem	Toyota	—N/a	—N/a	—N/a	—N/a
1994–95	Sekem	Toyota	Toyota / SAFM	—N/a	—N/a	—N/a
1996	Sekem	Toyota	Toyota / SAFM	Toyota	—N/a	—N/a
1997–2000	Adidas	Toyota	Toyota	Toyota	—N/a	—N/a
2001	Fila	Toyota	Toyota	Toyota	—N/a	—N/a
2002	Fila	Toyota	The Ghan	Toyota	—N/a	—N/a
2003–04	Russell Athletic	Toyota	The Ghan	Toyota	—N/a	—N/a
2005	Russell Athletic	Toyota	Carlton Draught	Toyota	—N/a	—N/a
2006–07	Adidas	Toyota	Carlton Black	Toyota	—N/a	—N/a
2008–09	Adidas	Toyota	Carlton Draught	Toyota	—N/a	—N/a
2010	Reebok	Toyota	Fielders	Toyota	—N/a	—N/a
2011–12	Reebok	Toyota	Crompton Lighting	Toyota	—N/a	—N/a
2013	Puma	Toyota	Adelaide Casino	Toyota	—N/a	—N/a
2014	Puma	Toyota	OTR	Toyota	—N/a	—N/a
2015–16	BLK	Toyota	Domain	Toyota	—N/a	—N/a
2017–18	ISC	Toyota	Domain	Toyota	—N/a	—N/a
2019	ISC	Toyota	Optus	Optus	—N/a	—N/a
2020	ISC	Toyota	Optus	Optus	Optus	—N/a
2021	O'Neills	Toyota	Optus	Optus	Optus	—N/a
2022–24	O'Neills	Toyota	Thomas Foods	Hungry Jack's	Crypto.com	—N/a
2025	O'Neills	Toyota	Thomas Foods	Hungry Jack's	Adelaide University	—N/a
2026–	O'Neills	Toyota	Thomas Foods	Hungry Jack's	Adelaide University	Hungry Jack's

==== AFL Women's ====
Year	Kit manufacturer	Major sponsor	Shorts sponsor	Bottom rear sponsor	Top rear sponsor
2017	Cotton On	Workskil Australia	Thomas Farms	Harris Scarfe	—N/a
2018–19	Cotton On	Workskil Australia	Thomas Farms	BHP	—N/a
2020–21	Cotton On	Workskil Australia	Optus	BHP	—N/a
2022–24	Cotton On	Workskil Australia	Thomas Farms	BHP	Crypto.com
2025–	Cotton On	Workskil Australia	Thomas Farms	BHP	Adelaide University

==== Other sponsors ====
Major Partner	Toyota					
Principal Partner	Hungry Jack's					
Premier Partners	Adelaide University	Balfours	Bendigo Bank	Bridgestone	Coopers	Foodland
Premier Partners	LiSTNR	RAA	Rite Price	SAFM	Thomas Foods	Triple M
Official Partners	Bird in Hand	Cool Ridge	Country Blinds	Farmer's Union Iced Coffee	Flight Centre	Gatorade
Official Partners	Hentley Farm	Here For The Game	Hoka	Jones Radiology	Mitre 10	O'Neills
Official Partners	OpSys	Pepsi Max	Ray White	San Remo	Seven Network	Sterling Homes
Official Partners	Think! Road Safety	Thomson Geer Lawyers	V	Variety SA	Viatek	Viterra

== Honours and records ==
=== Club achievements ===
Premierships
Competition	Level	Wins	Years won
Australian Football League	Seniors	2	1997, 1998
AFL Women's	Seniors	3	2017, 2019, 2022 (S6)
Other titles and honours
AFL pre-season competition	Seniors	2	2003, 2012
AFLX Tournament	Seniors	1	2018
McClelland Trophy	Various	2	2005, 2017
Finishing positions
Australian Football League	Minor premiership	3	2005, 2017, 2025
Australian Football League	Grand Finalist	1	2017
Australian Football League	Wooden spoons	1	2020
AFL Women's	Minor premiership	3	2021, 2022 (S6), 2023
AFL Women's	Grand Finalist	1	2021
AFL Women's	Wooden spoons	0	Nil
SANFL	Minor premiership	0	Nil
SANFL	Grand Finalist	0	Nil
SANFL	Wooden spoons	1	2018

=== Hall of Fame ===
The Adelaide Football Club established their Hall of Fame in 2015, for its 25th year in the AFL. It honours the greatest contributors to the club and specifically includes members who have made a "profound" impact. 18 members have been inducted, including 12 AFL players, one AFLW player, three administrators, the interim board, and a coach.

Adelaide Football Club
**Hall of Fame**
**Individuals**

Bill Sanders
**Andrew McLeod**
Tyson Edwards
Shaun Rehn

**Bob Hammond**
**Simon Goodwin**
Nigel Smart
**Erin Phillips**

**Mark Ricciuto**
**Malcolm Blight**
Interim Board (Note: Max Basheer, Bob Lee, Adrian Sutter, Rick Allert, Ed Betro, Leigh Whicker, Bob Hammond)
**Darren Jarman**

**Ben Hart**
Chris McDermott
Barrie Downs

Tony Modra
**Mark Bickley**
Scott Thompson

Players listed in **bold** are inductees in the Australian Football Hall of Fame.
Players listed in **bold and italics** are legends in the Australian Football Hall of Fame.

=== Records ===
Highest Score For	30.8 (188) v Essendon, Round 10, 2006, Football Park
Lowest Score For	2.9 (21) v Essendon, Round 17, 2021, Docklands Stadium
Highest Score Against	32.18 (210) v Geelong, Round 8, 1992, Kardinia Park
Lowest Score Against	1.7 (13) v Fremantle, Round 15, 2009, Football Park
Highest Aggregate Score	44.33 (297) v Geelong, Round 8, 1992, Kardinia Park
Lowest Aggregate Score	11.19 (85) v Melbourne, Round 5, 2009, Melbourne Cricket Ground, 12.13 (85) v Fremantle, Round 7, 2019, Adelaide Oval
Lowest Winning Score	6.12 (48) v Collingwood, Round 21, 1997, Football Park
Highest Losing Score	19.11 (125) v Kangaroos, Round 9, 2000, Football Park
Highest Quarter Score	14.2 (86) v Fitzroy, 2nd Quarter, Round 9, 1996, Football Park
Greatest Winning Margin	139 points v Richmond, Round 16, 1993, Football Park
Greatest Losing Margin	141 points v Brisbane Lions, Round 17, 2004, The Gabba
Longest Winning Streak	10 matches from 18 June 2005 (Round 13, v Richmond, Telstra Dome) to 27 August 2005 (Round 22, v West Coast, Subiaco Oval)
Longest Losing Streak	16 matches from 11 August 2019 (Round 21, v West Coast, Optus Stadium) to 23 August 2020 (Round 13, v Geelong, Adelaide Oval)
Longest Winning Streak Against An Opponent	13 matches v Gold Coast from 14 May 2011 (Round 8, Football Park) to 13 July 2019 (Round 17, Metricon Stadium)
Longest Losing Streak Against An Opponent	10 matches v Collingwood from 13 April 2018 (Round 4, Adelaide Oval) to 17 May 2025 (Round 10, Melbourne Cricket Ground)
Largest Home Attendance	54,283 v Collingwood, Round 23, 2025, Adelaide Oval
Largest Away Non-Finals Attendance	67,697 v Collingwood, Round 10, 2025, Melbourne Cricket Ground
Largest Attendance	100,021 v Richmond, Grand Final, 2017, Melbourne Cricket Ground
Most goals in a match by an individual	13 – Tony Modra v Richmond, Round 16, 1993, Football Park, Tony Modra v Carlton, Round 1, 1994 Football Park
Most disposals in a match by an individual	51 – Scott Thompson v Gold Coast, Round 22, 2011, Metricon Stadium

=== AFL finishing positions (1991–present) ===
Finishing Position	Year (Finals in Bold)	Tally
Premiers	**1997**, **1998**	2
Runner-Up	**2017**	1
3rd	**1993**, **2005**, **2006**, **2012**	4
4th	**2002**	1
5th	**2003**, **2009**, **2025**	3
6th	**2015**, **2016**	2
7th	**2008**	1
8th	**2001**, **2007**	2
9th	1991, 1992	2
10th	2014, 2023	2
11th	1994, 1995, 2000, 2010, 2013, 2019	6
12th	1996, 2004, 2018	3
13th	1999	1
14th	2011, 2022	2
15th	2021, 2024	2
16th	nil	0
17th	nil	0
18th	2020	1

=== Premierships ===
1997 AFL Grand Final
Saturday, 27 September (2:30 pm)	St Kilda	def. by	**Adelaide**	MCG (crowd: 99,645)
3.6 (24); 7.11 (53); 9.13 (67); 13.16 (94)	**Q1; Q2; Q3; Final**	3.8 (26); 5.10 (40); 11.11 (77); 19.11 (125)	Umpires: Kennedy (7), Sheehan (9), Nash (14); Norm Smith Medal: Andrew McLeod (Adelaide); Television broadcast: Seven Network; National anthem: Marina Prior
Heatley 3, Hall 3, Loewe 2, Jones, Burke, Winmar, Peckett, Harvey	**Goals**	Jarman 6, Ellen 5, Bond 4, Smart, Goodwin, Rintoul, Caven
Harvey, Jones, Burke, Hall, Cook, Keogh	**Best**	McLeod, Jarman, Johnson, Ellen, Goodwin, Caven
St Kilda won the coin toss and kicked to the Punt Road end in the first quarter.

1998 AFL Grand Final
Saturday, 26 September (2:30pm)	**Adelaide**	def.	North Melbourne	MCG (crowd: 94,431)
3.2 (20); 4.3 (27); 9.11 (65); 15.15 (105)	**Q1; Q2; Q3; Final**	4.4 (28); 6.15 (51); 8.15 (63); 8.22 (70)	Umpires: Coates (6), Kennedy (7), Goldspink (32); Norm Smith Medal: Andrew McLeod; Television broadcast: Seven Network; National anthem: Rob Guest
Jarman 5, Smart 3, Vardy 2, James, Pittman, Johnson, Thiessen, Ricciuto	**Goals**	Blakey, Pike, Abraham, Carey, Roberts, Bell, Allison, Simpson
McLeod, Hart, Jarman, Johnson, Rehn, Caven, Bickley	**Best**	Pickett, Stevens, Martyn, Abraham
North Melbourne won the coin toss and kicked to the Punt Road end in the first quarter.

==== Premiership teams ====
1997 Premiership Team
B:	Ben Hart	Rod Jameson	Peter Caven
HB:	Andrew McLeod	David Pittman	Simon Goodwin
C:	Kym Koster	Kane Johnson	Matthew Connell
HF:	Troy Bond	Matthew Robran	Nigel Smart
F:	Chad Rintoul	Shane Ellen	Clay Sampson
Foll:	Shaun Rehn	Mark Bickley (Capt.)	Darren Jarman
Int:	Tyson Edwards	Aaron Keating	Brett James
Coach:	Malcolm Blight		

1998 Premiership Team
B:	Tyson Edwards	Ben Hart	David Pittman
HB:	Simon Goodwin	Peter Caven	Nigel Smart
C:	Kym Koster	Darren Jarman	Andrew Eccles
HF:	Peter Vardy	Matthew Robran	Andrew McLeod
F:	Mark Bickley (Capt.)	Mark Stevens	Shane Ellen
Foll:	Shaun Rehn	Mark Ricciuto	Kane Johnson
Int:	Matthew Connell	Brett James	Ben Marsh
Int:	James Thiessen		
Coach:	Malcolm Blight		

=== "Team of the Decade" ===
While some sides named their "Team of the Century" to coincide with the AFL centenary celebrations in 1996, Adelaide only joined the league in 1991, and so later on named their "Team of the Decade", covering the period from 1991 to 2000. As well as earning selection in the team, Mark Ricciuto was named 'Player of the Decade' and Mark Bickley 'Team Man of the Decade.'

Adelaide Team of the Decade
B:	Ben Hart	Rod Jameson	Mark Bickley
HB:	Nigel Smart	Peter Caven	Andrew McLeod
C:	Greg Anderson	Andrew Jarman	Simon Tregenza
HF:	Kane Johnson	Matthew Robran	Mark Ricciuto
F:	Darren Jarman	Tony Modra	Matthew Liptak
Foll:	Shaun Rehn	Chris McDermott	Tony McGuinness
Int:	Mark Mickan	Simon Goodwin	Rodney Maynard
Int:	David Pittman		
Coach:	Malcolm Blight		

=== Pre-season competition ===
2003 Wizard Cup Grand Final	SG	G	B	Total
Adelaide	**2**	**13**	**8**	**104**
Collingwood	1	9	10	73
Venue: Telstra Dome, Melbourne	Crowd: 43,571

2012 NAB Cup Grand Final	SG	G	B	Total
Adelaide	**2**	**10**	**17**	**95**
West Coast	2	5	13	61
Venue: Football Park, Adelaide	Crowd: 27,376

2018 AFLX Group 1 Grand Final	SG	G	B	Total
Adelaide	**3**	**3**	**7**	**55**
Geelong	2	4	3	47
Venue: Coopers Stadium, Adelaide	Crowd: 10,253

== Player achievements ==
Brownlow Medal (AFL best and fairest)

- 2003 – Mark Ricciuto

Coleman Medal (AFL leading goalkicker)

- 1997 – Tony Modra (81)

AFLCA Champion Player of the Year

- 2006 – Simon Goodwin

AFL Rising Star

- 2012 – Daniel Talia

Norm Smith Medal (AFL Grand Final best on ground)

- 1997 – Andrew McLeod
- 1998 – Andrew McLeod

AFL Women's best and fairest

- 2017 – Erin Phillips
- 2019 – Erin Phillips
- 2024 – Ebony Marinoff

AFL Women's leading goalkicker

- 2019 – Stevie-Lee Thompson (13)
- 2022 (S6) – Ashleigh Woodland (19)

AFLCA Women's Champion Player of the Year

- 2018 – Chelsea Randall
- 2019 – Erin Phillips
- 2024 – Ebony Marinoff

AFL Women's Rising Star

- 2017 – Ebony Marinoff

=== All-Australians ===
An All-Australian team is considered a "best-of" selection of players for each calendar year, with each player represented in their team position. Captains and vice-captains, indicated with (c) and (vc) respectively, are awarded to players who displayed leadership and excellence on the field during the season. Each team is selected by a panel of experts.

AFL Men

- Nigel Smart – 1991, 1993, 1998
- Ben Hart – 1992, 1993, 1999, 2002
- Tony McGuiness – 1992, 1993
- Chris McDermott – 1992
- Greg Anderson – 1993
- Tony Modra – 1993, 1997
- Shaun Rehn – 1994, 1998
- Mark Ricciuto – 1994, 1997, 1998, 2000, 2002, 2003, 2004 (c), 2005 (c)
- Darren Jarman – 1996
- Andrew McLeod – 1998, 2000, 2001, 2006, 2007 (c)
- Simon Goodwin – 2000, 2001, 2005, 2006, 2009
- Ben Rutten – 2005
- Nathan Bassett – 2006
- Nathan Bock – 2009
- Patrick Dangerfield – 2012, 2013, 2015
- Scott Thompson – 2012
- Brodie Smith – 2014
- Daniel Talia – 2014, 2016
- Eddie Betts – 2015, 2016, 2017
- Rory Sloane – 2016 (vc)
- Matt Crouch – 2017
- Rory Laird – 2017, 2018
- Jordan Dawson – 2023, 2025 (vc), 2026 (vc)
- Taylor Walker – 2023
- Riley Thilthorpe – 2025
- Wayne Milera – 2026

AFL Women

- Courtney Cramey – 2017
- Chelsea Randall – 2017, 2018 (c), 2019 (vc), 2022 (S7), 2024
- Erin Phillips – 2017 (vc), 2019 (c), 2021
- Sarah Perkins – 2017
- Ebony Marinoff – 2017, 2019, 2021, 2022 (S6), 2022 (S7), 2023, 2024 (vc)
- Stevie-Lee Thompson – 2019
- Anne Hatchard – 2019, 2020, 2022 (S6), 2022 (S7)
- Sarah Allan – 2020, 2021, 2022 (S6)
- Ashleigh Woodland – 2022 (S6)
- Chelsea Biddell – 2022 (S7), 2023, 2024
- Niamh Kelly – 2023
- Danielle Ponter – 2023
- Caitlin Gould – 2024

== See also ==
- Adelaide Football Club coaches
- List of Adelaide Football Club players
- Australian rules football in South Australia
- History of the Adelaide Football Club
- Sport in Australia
- Sport in South Australia
- Category:Adelaide Football Club players
