= Scott Burns (footballer) =

Australian rules footballer, born 1974

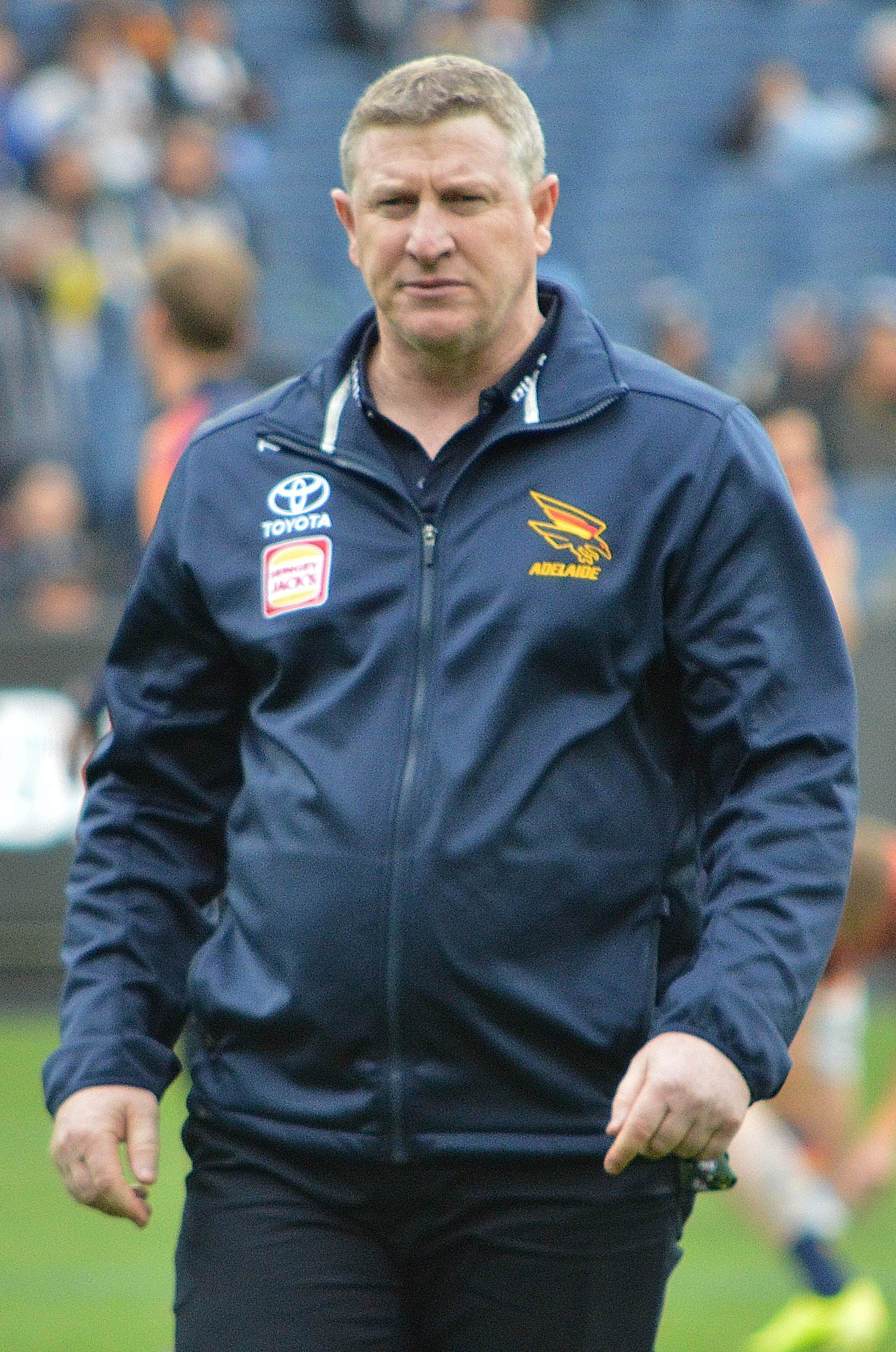
- Burns with Adelaide in May 2025

Personal information
- Full name: Scott Burns
- Born: 23 December 1974 (age 51); South Australia
- Original team: Norwood (SANFL)
- Debut: Round 1, 1995, Collingwood vs. Carlton, at MCG
- Height: 181 cm (5 ft 11 in)
- Weight: 85 kg (187 lb)

Playing career^{1}
Years	Club	Games (Goals)
1992–1994	Norwood (SANFL)	63 (12)
1995–2008	Collingwood	265 (149)
Total		328 (161)

Coaching career^{3}
Years	Club	Games (W–L–D)
2022	Adelaide	0 (0–1–0)
- ^{1} Playing statistics correct to the end of 2008.^{3} Coaching statistics correct as of round 8, 2022.

Career highlights
- Harry Collier Trophy: 1995; Wrecker Award: 1996; Collingwood captain: 2008

Scott Burns (born 23 December 1974) is a former Australian rules footballer who played for and captained the Collingwood Football Club in the Australian Football League (AFL). Burns currently serves as the Senior Assistant Coach of the Adelaide Football Club.

== Playing career ==
Originally from Norwood Football Club in the South Australian National Football League, Burns was drafted by the Collingwood Football Club with the 90th selection in the 1992 National draft. He made his début in 1995, two years after being drafted, after moving from South Australia and played every game except one for the season. In 1996 he was second in Collingwood's best and fairest award and also represented South Australia in State of Origin. In 1997 a groin injury restricted him to fourteen games and in 1998 he missed most of the first half of the season due to a broken arm.

He was appointed vice captain in 1999. In 2001 he was again forced out with recurrent hamstring injuries and was limited to eight games. Collingwood made the Grand Final in 2002 and Burns played a magnificent season, coming runner-up in the best and fairest once again. As a veteran of the club, he was only experiencing his first final when he played against Port Adelaide. He had 505 disposals for the season and was a dominant midfielder and forward, kicking twenty eight goals in the season. In 2003 he came third in the best and fairest. Injuries once again got hold of Burns in 2004 but he still managed to play nineteen games. He played every game in the 2005 season.

In March 2008, Scott Burns was appointed Collingwood captain for the 2008 season, replacing Nathan Buckley.

On 22 September 2008 Burns announced his retirement from AFL due to injury problems. He played a total of 265 games kicking 149 goals in his 14-year career.

== Coaching career ==
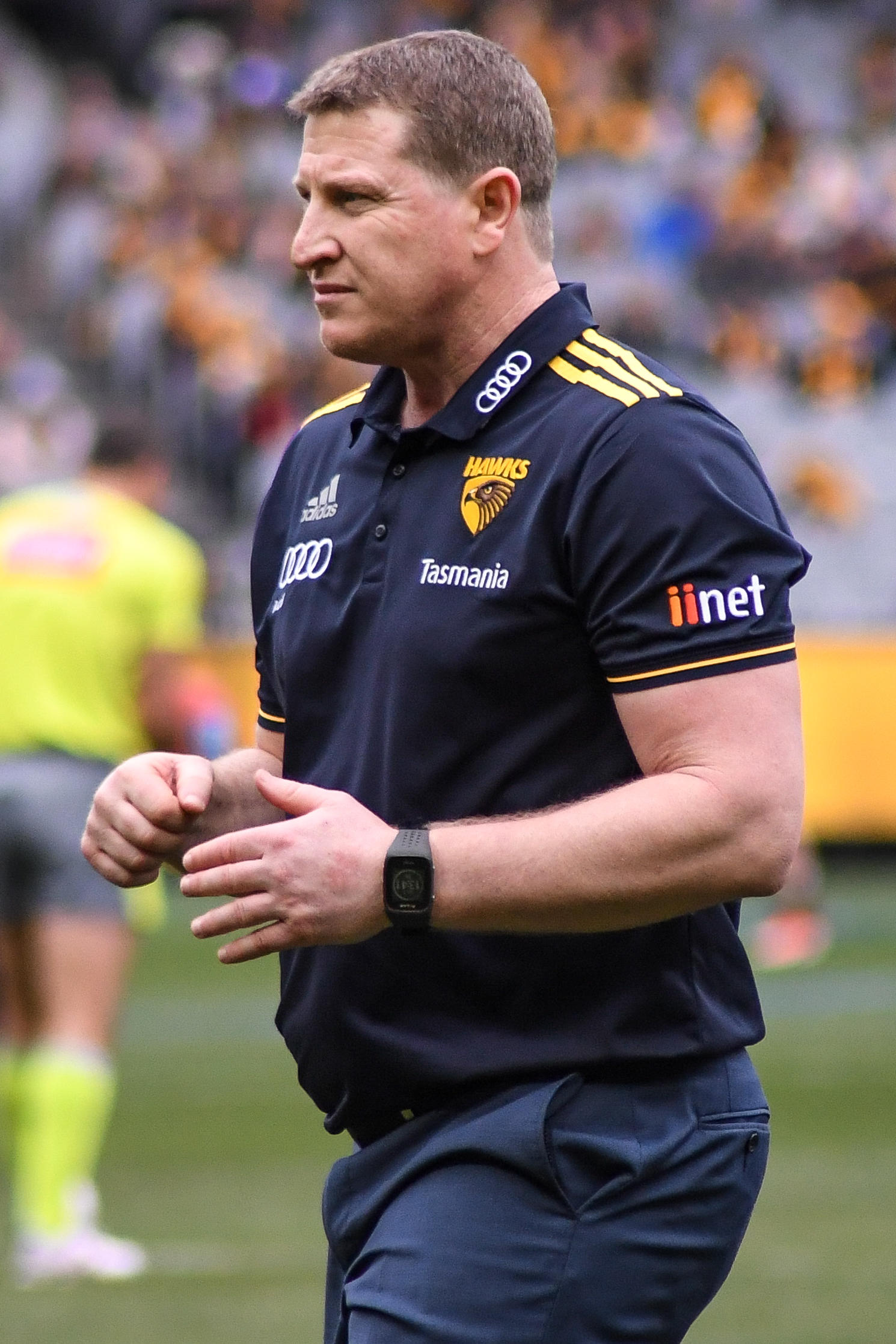
Burns with Hawthorn in August 2018

He was an assistant coach of the West Coast Eagles from 2008 to 2013. On 8 October 2013, after missing out on the West Coast Eagles head coach job to Adam Simpson he accepted an offer to return to Collingwood as an assistant coach under head coach Nathan Buckley. After four years as Collingwood's midfield coach, Burns accepted an assistant coach position at Hawthorn. After serving as Hawthorn's midfield coach for the 2018 AFL season, Burns served as Hawthorn's forwards coach for the 2019 AFL season. Despite rumours that Burns would become the new head coach at Adelaide for the departing Don Pyke, Burns continued with the Hawks in the 2020 season.

On 23 September 2020, it was announced that Burns would take on the role of senior assistant coach for the Adelaide Football Club. Burns acted as head coach for a 2022 match against Carlton following coach Matthew Nicks's unavailability due to COVID-19.

== Statistics ==
Updated to the end of the 2008 AFL season.

Legend
G	Goals	K	Kicks	D	Disposals	T	Tackles
B	Behinds	H	Handballs	M	Marks

Season	Team	No.	Games	Totals							Averages (per game)						
Season	Team	No.	Games	G	B	K	H	D	M	T	G	B	K	H	D	M	T
1995	Collingwood	17	21	2	2	149	130	279	59	42	0.1	0.1	7.1	6.2	13.3	2.8	2.0
1996	Collingwood	17	22	8	7	243	147	390	107	49	0.4	0.3	11.0	6.7	17.7	4.9	2.2
1997	Collingwood	17	14	6	1	153	84	237	70	27	0.4	0.1	10.9	6.0	16.9	5.0	1.9
1998	Collingwood	17	14	9	4	185	122	307	63	32	0.6	0.3	13.2	8.7	21.9	4.5	2.3
1999	Collingwood	17	15	10	5	199	128	327	83	29	0.7	0.3	13.3	8.5	21.8	5.5	1.9
2000	Collingwood	17	20	10	7	220	135	355	123	33	0.5	0.4	11.0	6.8	17.8	6.2	1.7
2001	Collingwood	17	8	4	1	53	74	127	31	11	0.5	0.1	6.6	9.3	15.9	3.9	1.4
2002	Collingwood	17	25	13	5	250	211	461	115	95	0.5	0.2	10.0	8.4	18.4	4.6	3.8
2003	Collingwood	17	23	28	19	266	239	505	126	82	1.2	0.8	11.6	10.4	22.0	5.5	3.6
2004	Collingwood	17	19	17	10	163	145	308	83	41	0.9	0.5	8.6	7.6	16.2	4.4	2.2
2005	Collingwood	17	22	14	9	200	192	392	110	45	0.6	0.4	9.1	8.7	17.8	5.0	2.0
2006	Collingwood	17	20	11	5	213	216	429	123	47	0.6	0.3	10.7	10.8	21.5	6.2	2.4
2007	Collingwood	17	25	12	11	243	229	472	109	102	0.5	0.4	9.7	9.2	18.9	4.4	4.1
2008	Collingwood	17	17	5	4	179	164	343	81	71	0.3	0.2	10.5	9.6	20.2	4.8	4.2
Career			265	149	90	2716	2216	4932	1283	706	0.6	0.3	10.2	8.4	18.6	4.8	2.7
