= Matthew Connell =

Australian rules footballer, born 1972

Personal information
- Full name: Matthew Denney Connell
- Born: 3 August 1972 (age 54)
- Original team: Subiaco (WAFL)
- Height: 181 cm (5 ft 11 in)
- Weight: 76 kg (168 lb)

Playing career^{1}
Years	Club	Games (Goals)
1993	West Coast	3 (0)
1995–2000	Adelaide	96 (28)
Total		99 (28)
- ^{1} Playing statistics correct to the end of 2000.

Career highlights
- 2× AFL premiership player (1997, 1998); Malcolm Blight Medal (1995)

Matthew Denney Connell (born 3 August 1972) is a former Australian rules footballer who played in the Australian Football League for the Adelaide Crows and West Coast Eagles. Educated at Newman College, he has now returned there as a teacher.

Drafted by West Coast from Western Australian Football League (WAFL) club Subiaco with pick 29 of the 1991 AFL draft, Connell played three games for West Coast in 1993 without making an impact.

Transferring to Adelaide in 1995, Connell had a brilliant season, winning the Crows Best and Fairest and a position in the Western Australian State of Origin side. In 1996 Connell suffered a thigh injury early in the season and when he returned he could not recapture his 1995 form.

Connell played in Adelaide's 1997 and 1998 Premierships before retiring at the end of the 2000 AFL season.

He coached the Great Britain Bulldogs Australian rules football team in the 2005 International Cup, held in Melbourne, guiding the team to a 6th place finish.

== Playing statistics ==
Legend
G	Goals	K	Kicks	D	Disposals	T	Tackles
B	Behinds	H	Handballs	M	Marks

Season	Team	No.	Games	Totals							Averages (per game)						
Season	Team	No.	Games	G	B	K	H	D	M	T	G	B	K	H	D	M	T
1993	West Coast	42	3	0	1	17	1	18	5	0	0.0	0.3	5.7	0.3	6.0	1.7	0.0
1994	West Coast	42	0	—	—	—	—	—	—	—	—	—	—	—	—	—	—
1995	Adelaide	14	21	6	9	329	152	481	109	18	0.3	0.4	15.7	7.2	22.9	5.2	0.9
1996	Adelaide	14	14	4	3	171	99	270	46	14	0.3	0.2	12.2	7.1	19.3	3.3	1.0
1997	Adelaide	14	17	6	0	215	62	277	71	25	0.4	0.0	12.6	3.6	16.3	4.2	1.5
1998	Adelaide	14	21	7	3	232	87	319	77	27	0.3	0.1	11.0	4.1	15.2	3.7	1.3
1999	Adelaide	14	10	2	3	141	38	179	39	9	0.2	0.3	14.1	3.8	17.9	3.9	0.9
2000	Adelaide	14	13	3	2	196	60	256	84	11	0.2	0.2	15.1	4.6	19.7	6.5	0.8
Career			99	28	21	1301	499	1800	431	104	0.3	0.2	13.1	5.0	18.2	4.4	1.1

== Honors ==
- 1995 Adelaide best and fairest
- 1997 premiership player
- 1998 premiership player
