= Thomsons =

Australian law firm

- Headquarters: Level 14, 60 Martin Place; Sydney, Australia
- No. of offices: 6
- Major practice areas: Full service commercial law
- Date founded: 1885
- Company type: Partnership
- Website: www.thomsons.com.au

Thomsons is a major independent Australian commercial law firm founded in 1885. Predecessor firm Thomson Geer changed its name to Thomsons on 26 May 2026, with other predecessor firms including Thomson Geer, Thomsons Lawyers and Herbert Geer. The firm operates a full commercial law service as a fully integrated national firm with offices in Sydney, Melbourne, Brisbane, Perth, Adelaide and Canberra. It is one of the top ten firms in the country by revenue, and the ninth largest firm in Australia by headcount.

== Leadership ==
Thomsons' Chief Executive Partner is Adrian Tembel, who has been leading the firm since 2009. He is one of the longest-serving major law firm leaders in Australia. Loretta Reynolds was appointed as the Chair of the Board of Partners in 2007, making her the first female Chair in the firm's history.

== History ==
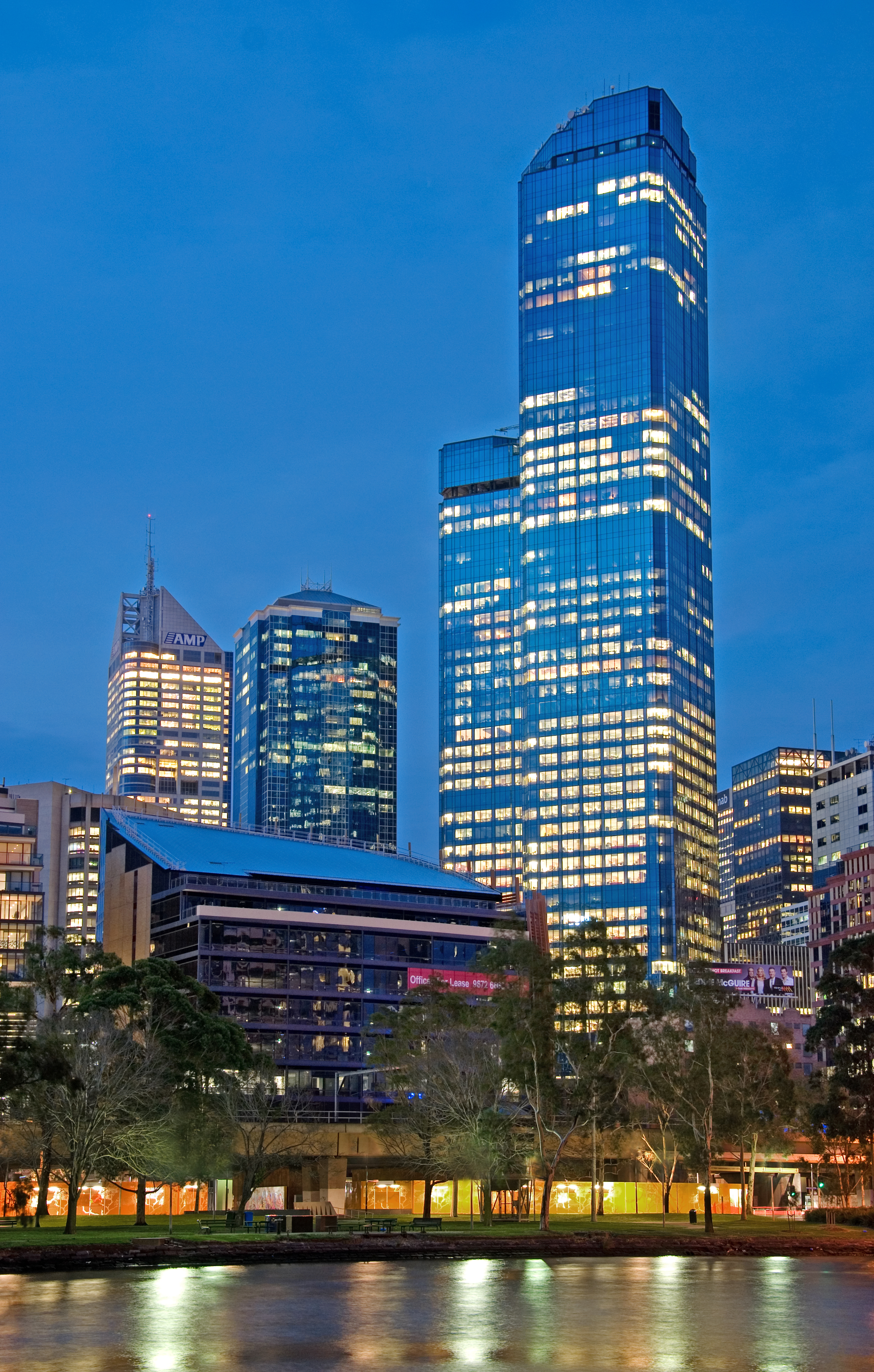
Rialto Towers, Thomson Geer’s Melbourne office

On 25 May 2026, the firm changed its name to Thomsons from Thomson Geer. The change was to reflect the evolution of the firm and position it to have a sharper identity and clearer role, with Thomsons being trusted by companies, governments and other institutions on important legal assignments where complexity, consequence and scrutiny converge. At the same time, Thomsons announced spinout TG Legal and Technology was to be now be known as Faculti Lawyers, which focusses on business-as-usual legal portfolios with the optimal use of technology.

=== Thomson Geer ===
Thomson Geer was formed on 31 March 2014 as a merger of two mid-tier Australian practices, Thomson Lawyers and Herbert Geer. The result was a firm with annual revenue in excess of $120 million, and the seventh largest firm in Australia by headcount.

=== Thomsons Lawyers ===
Thomsons Lawyers was an incarnation of a number of prominent boutique firms throughout Australia that merged. The firm's origins date back to 1885 when Hiram Wentworth Varley and Griffith Mostyn Evan began practice under the name of 'Varley & Evan'. In 1913 they were joined by Harry Thomson KC, and the name changed to 'Varley Evan & Thomson', the first of a succession of 'Thomson' firms, such as Thomsons Solicitors & Barristers, Thomson Simmons & Co and later, Thomson Playford.

In 2006, Thomson Playford established a Sydney practice by merging with Cowley Hearne a North Sydney-based boutique founded in the 1960s. In 2008, Thomson Playford merged with Sydney CBD based boutique, Cutler, Hughes & Harris, becoming Thomson Playford Cutlers. Later that year, the firm controversially poached the entire Melbourne practice of national mid-tier firm, Dibbs Abbott Stillman. This prompted Dibbs Abbott Stillman to rename itself to Dibbs Barker. In 2010, the firm rebranded to Thomsons Lawyers.

In 2011, Thomsons Lawyers expanded to Brisbane, with 10 partners and 51 professional and support staff defecting from DLA Phillips Fox to establish the Brisbane practice.

Prior to the 2014 merger with Herbert Geer, Thomsons experienced significant growth since 2009, with revenue and average profit per partner, tripling.

=== Herbert Geer ===
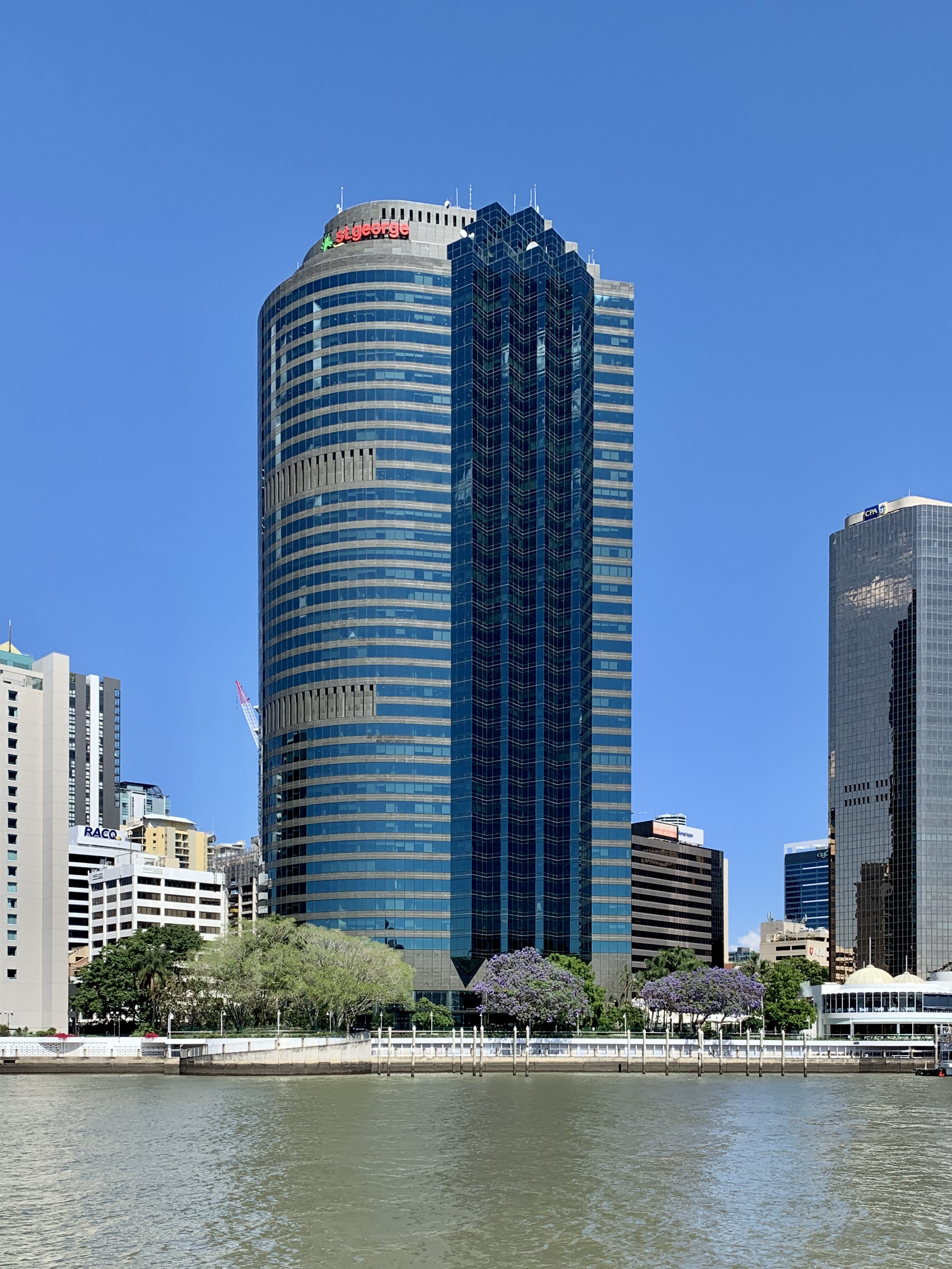
Waterfront Place, Brisbane, Thomson Geer’s Brisbane offices

Herbert Geer was a Melbourne-based law firm founded in 1939 when Keith Geer commenced his sole practice in Bank Place, off Collins Street, Melbourne. Temporarily suspending practice during the Second World War, he was joined by Geoffrey Herbert in 1946. In 1950 the partnership expanded further with the addition of Eric Rundell and in 1960 it assumed the name, Herbert Geer & Rundle. In 1962, the Melbourne office relocated to 113 William Street, taking with it a total of ten partners and staff. Between 1962 and 1970, three small practices were absorbed into Herbert Geer & Rundle; Farmer & Ramsay, William & Matthews and the office of Cyril Brooks.

The firm achieved publicity in the early 1970s by handling the defendant’s litigation for all workers' compensation claims arising from the West Gate Bridge collapse. Further office relocations occurred with moves to Owen Dixon Chambers and BHP House before arriving at the State Bank Building in 1983 when the firm had 12 partners and 110 staff. In April 1999, Herbert Geer & Rundle opened a Sydney office and expanded to Brisbane in early 2001.

In 2008 the firm rebranded as Herbert Geer. At the same time it joined with Brisbane firm Nicol Robinson Halletts Lawyers, as well as the boutique construction firm RDK in Sydney.

Prior to the merger with Thomson Lawyers, Herbert Geer’s partnership had fallen by 28% from 53 partners to 38 in the preceding 3 years, due to lateral defections.

== Significant legal work ==
In 2022, Thomsons successfully defended former Prime Minister Scott Morrison, the 46th NSW Premier Dominic Perrottet, Liberal Party federal president John Olsen and others in the Federal Liberal Party intervention regarding the management of its NSW Division. These cases were heard in the Supreme Court of NSW, the NSW Court of Appeal and the High Court of Australia. Notably, the ruling of the New South Wales Court of Appeal is the leading precedent in Australia on the justiciability of disputes arising out of the constitutions of unincorporated political parties.

In 2015, Thomsons defended iiNet and other ISPs such as Telstra and Optus in Dallas Buyers Club LLC v iiNet Limited, a case brought in the Federal Court of Australia by Dallas Buyers Club for breach of copyright laws. The case set legal precedence in Australia, whereby copyright holders can gain access to the details of internet users who illegally obtain their copyright material. This will lead to individuals in breach of copyright be liable to damages by copyright holders. Thomsons successfully argued that any damages must only be compensatory and not exemplary, like in the United States.

In 2013, Thomsons successfully acted for the Plaintiffs in the Maiden Civil Case in Australia under the Personal Property Securities Act 2009 (Cth) (PPSA). The case established that the nemo dat rule has been displaced in Australia where the PPSA applies, and businesses that lease personal property must declare their interests under the Personal Property Securities Register, to maintain a priority.

In 2011, Thomsons advised the Mitchell Group on the $1.2 billion Fitzroy Coal Terminal Project, which created coal chain supply infrastructure capable to transporting 22 million tonnes of coal per annum to and from Central Queensland. The project created significant concerns about potential damage to the Great Barrier Reef, and in 2014 the project was indefinitely put on hold

In 2010, Herbert Geer successfully argued that State Parliaments cannot prevent State Supreme Courts from issuing prerogative relief for jurisdictional error, in the landmark High Court case of Kirk v Industrial Court of New South Wales. The case set a significant precedent in administrative and constitutional law that s 71 of the Constitution of Australia protects the integrity of State Supreme Courts.

== Offices ==
Thomsons has six offices across Australia. The firm is headquartered in Sydney, at 60 Martin Place. The Melbourne office is located at Rialto Towers on 525 Collins Street, the Brisbane office is in Waterfront Place, the Adelaide office is on 19 Gouger Street, the Perth office is locate at Central Park Tower, St Georges Terrace, and the Canberra office is located at Civic Quarter, Northbourne Avenue.
