= Matthew Nicks =

Australian rules footballer

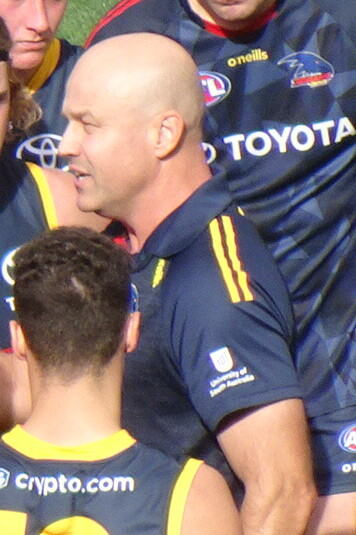
- Nicks addressing Adelaide players, 2022

Personal information
- Born: 13 May 1975 (age 51); Adelaide, South Australia
- Original team: West Adelaide (SANFL)
- Draft: No. 21, 1994 draft
- Debut: Round 3, 1996, Sydney vs. Collingwood, at SCG
- Height: 187 cm (6 ft 2 in)
- Weight: 88 kg (194 lb)
- Position: Forward

Playing career^{1}
Years	Club	Games (Goals)
1996–2005	Sydney Swans	175 (125)

International team honours
Years	Team	Games (Goals)
2001	Australia	2 (0)

Coaching career^{3}
Years	Club	Games (W–L–D)
2020–	Adelaide	156 (71–84–1)
- ^{1} Playing statistics correct to the end of 2005.^{3} Coaching statistics correct as of 2026.

Matthew Nicks (born 13 May 1975) is a former professional Australian rules footballer and the current senior coach of the Adelaide Crows in the Australian Football League (AFL). Recruited from West Adelaide in the 1994 national draft, Nicks spent his entire playing career with the Sydney Swans between 1996 and 2005.

Following his retirement, Nicks has had an extensive coaching career. From 2011 to 2018, he was an assistant coach at Port Adelaide and the Greater Western Sydney Giants in 2019. He was appointed the senior coach of Adelaide in October 2019. Under Nicks, the Crows completed the most significant turnaround in AFL history, rising from a 15th-placed finish in 2024 to claiming the minor premiership in the 2025 season.

== Playing career ==
=== Sydney Swans ===
Nicks made his Australian Football League debut in 1996 for the Sydney Swans and played a total of 175 games over the next 10 seasons. He retired from AFL football in 2005 after prolonged struggles with injury and illness, including a broken leg in 1995, pneumonia in 2000, a broken finger in 2001 and a stress fracture in his leg in 2005. He played his last game in Round 11 of 2005, and was unable to break back into the side which ultimately won the 2005 premiership.

== Coaching career ==
=== Port Adelaide Football Club assistant coach (2011–2018) ===
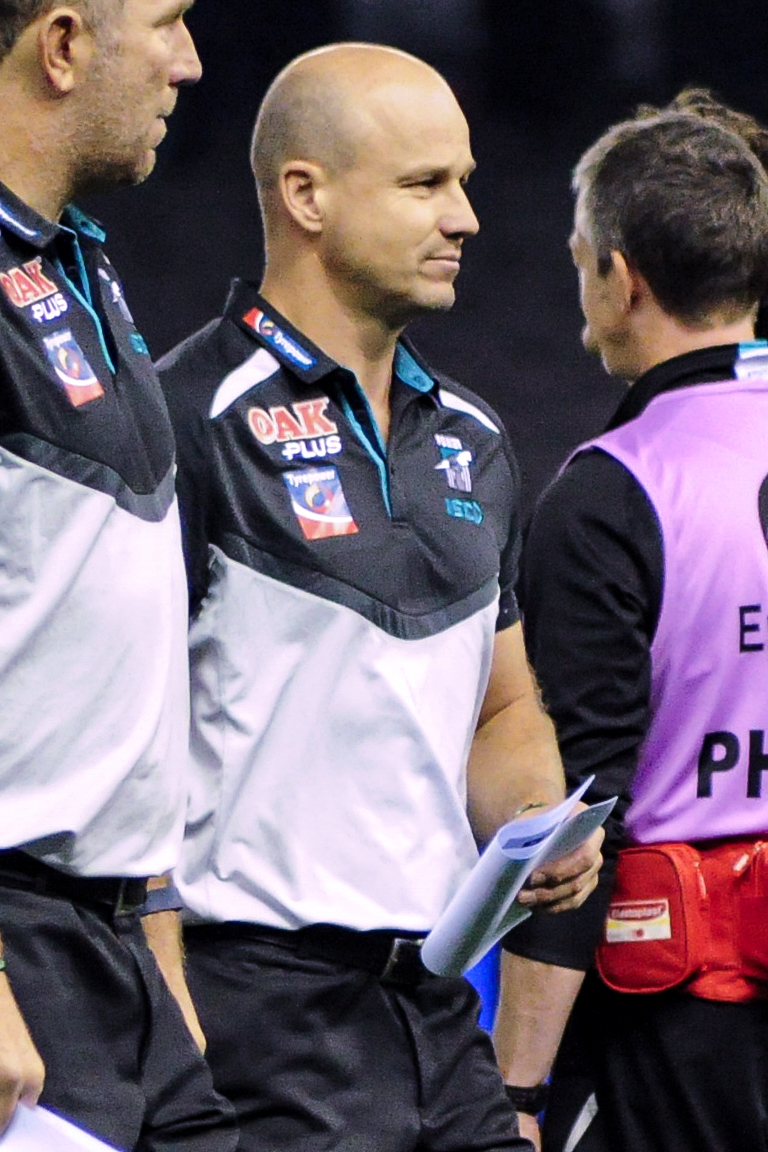
Nicks coaching for Port Adelaide in 2018

Nicks joined the Port Adelaide Football Club in 2011 as a club development coach in an assistant coaching position under senior coach Matthew Primus until the end of 2012 season, during which time the Power struggled towards the bottom part of the ladder, finishing 16th and 14th in 2011 and 2012 respectively. From 2013 to 2015, he served as the club's backline coach under senior coach Ken Hinkley and in 2016, he served as the forwards coach under senior coach Hinkley. In 2017, Nicks was named as Port Adelaide's senior assistant coach under senior coach Hinkley. Nicks left the Port Adelaide Football Club at the end of the 2018 season.

=== Greater Western Sydney Giants assistant coach (2019) ===
Nicks joined the GWS Giants as a senior assistant coach under senior coach Leon Cameron for the 2019 season. Nicks helped the club reach its first Grand Final appearance under Cameron.

=== Adelaide Football Club senior coach (2020–present) ===
In October 2019, Nicks was appointed senior coach of the Adelaide Football Club, shortly after previous senior coach Don Pyke announced his departure. Due to a variety of reasons, including the COVID-19 pandemic, the club entering a rebuild at his arrival, and the lack of experienced assistant coaches at Adelaide, the Crows under Nicks slumped to a 0–13 start to the 2020 season, leading to Nicks being called “the least supported coach” in Adelaide’s history. He won his first game as Adelaide Football Club senior coach when the Crows defeated Hawthorn by 35 points in round 15, 2020.

Nicks contracted COVID-19 in May of 2022. Senior assistant coach Scott Burns took his place for the round eight clash against Carlton.

In 2025, he guided the club to its first minor premiership since 2017 and also its first finals appearance since that very same season. However, the Crows did not win a quarter against either Collingwood or Hawthorn and became the first minor premiers since 1983 to exit the finals in straight sets. The following year Adelaide slipped to sixth on the ladder, and reports suggested that he would lose his job should the Crows fail to beat the Western Bulldogs in the elimination final. Adelaide won that game, but were eliminated in the semi-final the following week.

== Player statistics ==
Statistics are correct to end of career

Legend
G	Goals	K	Kicks	D	Disposals	T	Tackles
B	Behinds	H	Handballs	M	Marks

Season	Team	No.	Games	Totals							Averages (per game)							Votes
Season	Team	No.	Games	G	B	K	H	D	M	T	G	B	K	H	D	M	T	Votes
1996	Sydney	36	6	2	1	25	11	36	12	8	0.3	0.2	4.2	1.8	6.0	2.0	1.3	0
1997	Sydney	23	20	6	3	150	99	249	59	26	0.3	0.2	7.5	5.0	12.5	3.0	1.3	0
1998	Sydney	23	24	10	5	291	138	429	104	42	0.4	0.2	12.1	5.8	17.9	4.3	1.8	9
1999	Sydney	23	23	9	5	263	123	386	106	26	0.4	0.2	11.4	5.3	16.8	4.6	1.1	4
2000	Sydney	23	19	13	13	229	86	315	107	29	0.7	0.7	12.0	4.5	16.6	5.6	1.5	6
2001	Sydney	23	18	16	21	186	70	256	89	32	1.4	1.2	10.3	3.9	14.2	4.9	1.8	9
2002	Sydney	23	21	28	18	186	72	258	86	51	1.3	0.9	8.9	3.4	12.3	4.1	2.4	3
2003	Sydney	23	18	16	11	125	57	182	62	34	0.9	0.6	6.9	3.2	10.1	3.4	1.9	0
2004	Sydney	23	17	14	5	128	56	184	65	36	0.8	0.3	7.5	3.3	10.8	3.8	2.1	0
2005	Sydney	23	9	1	2	58	27	85	26	22	0.1	0.2	6.4	3.0	9.4	2.9	2.4	0
Career			175	125	84	1641	2380	2023	716	306	0.7	0.5	9.4	4.2	13.6	4.1	1.7	31

== Coaching statistics ==
Statistics are correct to the end of the 2026 season

Team	Year	Home and Away Season					Finals			
Team	Year	Won	Lost	Drew	Win %	Position	Won	Lost	Win %	Result
ADE	2020	3	14	0	.176	18th out of 18	-	-	-	-
ADE	2021	7	15	0	.318	15th out of 18	-	-	-	-
ADE	2022	8	13	0	.381	14th out of 18	-	-	-	-
ADE	2023	11	12	0	.478	10th out of 18	-	-	-	-
ADE	2024	8	14	1	.348	15th out of 18	-	-	-	-
ADE	2025	18	5	0	.783	1st out of 18	0	2	-	Lost to Hawthorn in the Semi Final
ADE	2026	15	8	0	.652	6th out of 18	1	1	.500	Lost to Brisbane Lions in the Semi Final
Total		70	81	1	.464	–	1	3	.250	

== Notes ==
1.Matthew Nicks missed the round 8 game against Carlton due to contracting COVID-19, senior assistant coach Scott Burns was appointed interim senior coach in his absence.
