= Thomas Foods International =

South Australian meat processor

- Company type: Private
- Industry: Livestock procurement; Meat processing; Meat production & value add; Distribution; Wholesale; Foodservice; Retail
- Predecessors: T and R Pastoral
- Founded: 1988; 38 years ago in South Australia, Australia
- Founders: Chris Thomas, Bob Rowe
- Key people: Darren Thomas
- Products: Red meat, beef, lamb, mutton, goat
- Website: thomasfoods.com; www.thomasfarms.com.au

Thomas Foods International (TFI) is Australia’s largest 100% family-owned red meat processor, headquartered in South Australia. The company is led by Darren Thomas, Managing Director and son of co-founder, Chris Thomas.

TFI is a fully vertically-integrated business, with the full supply chain in-house and employing over 3,000 people globally. Today, TFI own farms across Southern Australia for both livestock and cropping, have an extensive livestock procurement team across Australia, own a cattle feedlot near Tintinara, have five processing plants, with offices and/or further processing facilities in 9 countries. With an extensive distribution network, TFI supplies Australian beef, lamb, mutton and goat to over 85 countries.

== History ==
The company was founded as T and R Pastoral (T&R) by Chris Thomas and Bob Rowe in 1988. The company originally traded livestock and grew to include feedlots and outsourced meat processing. T&R bought the Murray Bridge meat processing facility in 1999 before then acquiring the Lobethal meat processing facility in 2004. In 2006, T&R also bought an abattoir in Western Australia and a defunct one in Port Pirie at which time it was the sixth-largest meat processor in Australia.

The Thomas family took outright ownership of T&R in 2008. In 2009, TFI merged with established US importer Foodcomm. In 2010, T&R bought Country Fresh, acquiring meat processing facilities in Tamworth, NSW and Wallangarra, QLD. Wallangarra was closed in 2016, however, Tamworth remains a key facility to TFI operations.

In 2012, T&R bought a 50% share in Holco, a premium meat distributor to wholesalers and retailers in Australia. A year later, T&R rebranded the company from T&R to Thomas Foods International. TFI eventually rebranded Foodcomm to Thomas Foods International USA and acquiring full ownership in 2017.

The company added one of Australia's largest potato processors, Mondello Farms in 2013. That business was renamed to Thomas Foods International Fresh Produce in 2014. In 2020, the potato processing business was sold to a competitor, Mitolo Family Farms.

In 2014, TFI bought into the Iranda Beef Feedlot in Tintinara, South Australia. The feedlot's capacity was initially 3,500 head, before TFI invested in an expansion taking capacity to 15,000. TFI took full ownership in 2017 and in 2023 completed another expansion. The feedlot, now known as Southern Cross Feedlot (SCF), has a 28,000 head capacity.

TFI took full ownership of Holco in 2018, rebranding the business to Thomas Foods International Australia (TFIA) in 2020. Today, TFIA provide expert protein solutions to wholesale, foodservice and retail customers.

In 2020, TFI bought 50% ownership of Frew Foods International, a meat processing facility and wholesaler in Stawell, Victoria. A year later, TFI bought the meat processing facility in Bourke, NSW, opening in 2022. TFI took full ownership of Frew Foods International in 2023 and rebranded the company to Thomas Foods International Stawell.

TFI processes over 160,000 head of smallstock a week between its facilities at Lobethal, Stawell, Tamworth and Bourke, and 5,000 head of beef cattle between Murray Bridge and service providers.

== Murray Bridge ==
A fire at the Murray Bridge abattoir in January 2018 destroyed the meat processing line. Over the following months, production was increased at Lobethal in the Adelaide Hills and at Tamworth in New South Wales. Darren Thomas, Managing Director, vowed to come back 'bigger, better, stronger.' In June 2019, Thomas Foods International announced that rather than rebuilding at the existing site in Murray Bridge, it would build a replacement on a new site eight kilometres away.

Construction of the new facility at Murray Bridge began in December 2020. With a $24million investment from the South Australian and Federal Governments, the new facility at Murray Bridge was completed in May 2023.

== Processing Facilities ==
- Murray Bridge, South Australia
- Lobethal, South Australia
- Stawell, Victoria
- Tamworth, New South Wales
- Bourke, New South Wales

== Office Locations ==
- Australia
- Canada
- China
- Japan
- Netherlands
- Middle-East (Dubai)
- South-East Asia (Singapore)
- United Kingdom
- United States of America

== See also ==
- List of South Australian manufacturing businesses
- South Australian food and drink
