= List of Adelaide Football Club records and statistics =

This article contains records and statistics for the Adelaide Football Club (Adelaide Crows) who have played in the Australian Football League since 1991. The information on this article does not take into consideration games played against non-AFL teams.

This article is correct to the end of the 2026 AFL season unless otherwise stated.

Main sources of information: afltables.com and afl.com.au

== Win–loss records ==
=== Active teams ===
Team	Games	Wins	Losses	Draws	Win%
Brisbane Lions	43	19	23	1	44.1%
Carlton	47	26	21	0	55.3%
Collingwood	55	17	37	1	30.9%
Essendon	47	22	25	0	46.8%
Fremantle	47	24	23	0	51.1%
Geelong	54	22	32	0	40.7%
Gold Coast	22	17	5	0	77.3%
Greater Western Sydney	20	13	7	0	65.0%
Hawthorn	53	23	30	0	43.4%
Melbourne	48	28	20	0	58.3%
North Melbourne	54	32	22	0	59.3%
Port Adelaide	60	31	29	0	51.7%
Richmond	47	29	18	0	61.7%
St Kilda	51	33	17	1	64.7%
Sydney	49	27	22	0	55.1%
West Coast	59	29	30	0	49.2%
Western Bulldogs	54	26	28	0	48.1%

=== Discontinued teams ===
Team	Games	Wins	Losses	Draws	Win%
Brisbane Bears	9	7	0	2	77.78%
Fitzroy	9	6	0	3	66.67%

== Score records ==
=== Highest scores ===
Highest score in a game by Adelaide Crows
Highest score	G.B	Opponent	Opp. Score	G.B	Venue	Game
188	30.8	Essendon	50	6.14	Football Park	round 10, 2006
187	29.13	Greater Western Sydney	52	7.10	Sydney Showground Stadium	round 7, 2013
185	29.11	Richmond	48	7.6	Football Park	round 17, 1997
180	28.12	North Melbourne	107	16.11	Football Park	round 24, 1991
178	27.16	Greater Western Sydney	59	8.11	Sydney Showground Stadium	round 16, 2012
178	28.10	Richmond	84	12.12	MCG	round 1, 1993
177	27.15	Brisbane Lions	39	6.3	Adelaide Oval	round 20, 2016
176	27.14	Carlton	104	16.8	Docklands Stadium	round 22, 2009
174	27.12	West Coast	52	8.4	Adelaide Oval	round 13, 2023
171	27.9	Essendon	59	8.11	Docklands Stadium	round 20, 2015
171	26.15	Richmond	32	4.8	Football Park	round 16, 1993
169	24.25	Geelong	78	11.12	Football Park	round 23, 1992
168	25.18	Brisbane Lions	63	9.9	The Gabba	round 20, 2014
167	25.17	Fremantle	74	11.8	Football Park	round 2, 1998
166	26.10	Essendon	70	10.10	Football Park	elimination final, 2009
166	26.10	Fitzroy	67	9.13	Football Park	round 17, 1996
165	26.9	Carlton	61	8.13	Docklands	round 23, 2018
163	24.19	Richmond	53	7.11	MCG	round 20, 1992
162	25.12	North Melbourne	100	15.10	Docklands Stadium	round 20, 2001
161	25.11	Essendon	100	15.10	MCG	round 2, 2025
161	24.17	Western Bulldogs	93	13.15	MCG	preliminary final, 1998
161	23.23	Essendon	65	9.11	Football Park	round 4, 1996

=== Lowest scores ===
Lowest Score in a game by Adelaide Crows
Lowest Score	G.B	Opponent	Opp. Score	G.B	Venue	Game
21	2.9	Essendon	84	11.18	Docklands Stadium	round 17, 2021
24	3.6	St Kilda	127	19.13	Docklands Stadium	round 18, 2011
29 (Note: The 2020 season was played with 17 home-and-away matches per team (down from 22) and 16-minute quarters with time on (down from 20-minute quarters with time on) due to the impact of the COVID-19 pandemic.)	4.5	Gold Coast	82	12.10	Carrara Stadium	round 3, 2020
31	4.7	St Kilda	162	24.18	Moorabbin Oval	round 7, 1991
32	4.8	Hawthorn	88	12.16	MCG	round 13, 2018
33	4.9	Richmond	77	12.5	Adelaide Oval	round 18, 2020
34	4.10	Fremantle	69	9.15	Perth Stadium	round 3, 2024
34	4.10	Footscray	118	17.16	Western Oval	round 20, 1994
34	4.10	Fremantle	54	8.6	Carrara Stadium	round 5, 2020
34	5.4	West Coast	67	10.7	The Gabba	round 6, 2020
35	5.5	Port Adelaide	110	17.8	Adelaide Oval	round 2, 2020
37	5.7	Collingwood	160	23.22	Victoria Park	round 15, 1991
37	5.7	Melbourne	88	13.10	Adelaide Oval	round 10, 2020
37	5.7	Geelong	65	9.11	Adelaide Oval	round 13, 2020
38	5.8	Geelong	91	13.13	Kardinia Park	round 19, 1994
38	5.8	Collingwood	62	10.2	Adelaide Oval	round 11, 2020
38	5.8	Port Adelaide	87	12.15	Adelaide Oval	round 8, 2021
39	4.15	Greater Western Sydney	106	15.16	Adelaide Oval	round 7, 2021

=== Biggest wins ===
Biggest winning margins by Adelaide Crows
Margin	G.B	Score	Opponent	G.B	Opp. Score	Venue	Game
139	26.15	171	Richmond	4.8	32	Football Park	round 16, 1993
138	27.15	177	Brisbane Lions	6.3	39	Adelaide Oval	round 20, 2016
138	30.8	188	Essendon	6.14	50	Football Park	round 10, 2006
137	29.11	185	Richmond	7.6	48	Football Park	round 17, 1997
135	29.13	187	Greater Western Sydney	7.10	52	Sydney Showground Stadium	round 7, 2013
122	27.12	174	West Coast	8.4	52	Adelaide Oval	round 13, 2023
119	27.16	178	Greater Western Sydney	8.11	59	Sydney Showground Stadium	round 16, 2012
117	19.16	130	Fremantle	1.7	13	Football Park	round 15, 2009
112	27.9	171	Essendon	8.11	59	Docklands Stadium	round 20, 2015
110	22.19	151	Collingwood	5.11	41	Football Park	round 21, 2005
110	24.19	163	Richmond	7.11	53	MCG	round 20, 1992
105	25.18	168	Brisbane Lions	9.9	63	The Gabba	round 20, 2014
104	26.9	165	Carlton	8.13	61	Docklands Stadium	round 23, 2018
100	20.23	143	Fremantle	6.7	43	Adelaide Oval	round 10, 2017

=== Biggest losses ===
Biggest losing margins by Adelaide Crows
Margin	G.B	Score	Opponent	G.B	Opp. Score	Venue	Game
141	6.12	48	Brisbane Lions	29.15	189	The Gabba	round 17, 2004
135	5.12	42	West Coast	26.21	177	Subiaco Oval	round 19, 1995
131	4.7	31	St Kilda	24.18	162	Moorabbin Oval	round 7, 1991
123	12.15	87	Geelong	32.18	210	Kardinia Park	round 8, 1992
123	5.7	37	Collingwood	23.22	160	Victoria Park	round 15, 1991
122	8.12	60	Essendon	27.20	182	MCG	round 14, 1995
118	5.11	41	Sydney	25.9	159	SCG	round 20, 1999
114	10.13	73	West Coast	29.13	187	WACA Ground	round 4, 2000
103	3.6	24	St Kilda	19.13	127	Docklands Stadium	round 18, 2011

=== Biggest upsets ===
Biggest upset wins by Adelaide Crows based on previous 20 games
Form	Score	Opponent	Opp. Form	Opp. Score	Venue	Game
4W 0D 16L	15.13 (103)	Geelong	14W 0D 6L	13.13 (91)	Adelaide Oval	round 1, 2021
3W 0D 17L	8.11 (59)	Greater Western Sydney	12W 0D 8L	7.5 (47)	Adelaide Oval	round 16, 2020
5W 0D 15L	15.6 (96)	Port Adelaide	13W 0D 7L	13.14 (92)	Adelaide Oval	round 3, 2022
7W 0D 13L	15.6 (96)	Melbourne	15W 0D 5L	14.11 (95)	Adelaide Oval	round 10, 2021
7W 1D 12L	7.14 (56)	West Coast	15W 0D 5L	6.10 (46)	Football Park	round 4, 1995

=== Biggest comebacks ===
Best wins from deficit by Adelaide Crows
Largest deficit	Score	Opponent	Opp. Score	Venue	Game
42	14.14 (98)	Port Adelaide	13.13 (91)	Football Park	round 7, 2000
39	18.17 (125)	North Melbourne	19.10 (124)	Docklands Stadium	round 9, 2013
36	9.12 (66)	St Kilda	8.12 (60)	Cazaly's Stadium	round 13, 2021
34	9.6 (60)	Hawthorn	7.16 (58)	Football Park	round 9, 1995
33	17.4 (106)	Richmond	13.9 (87)	Football Park	round 14, 2012

=== Biggest collapses ===
Worst losses from lead by Adelaide Crows
Largest lead	Score	Opponent	Opp. Score	Venue	Game
42	14.16 (100)	Essendon	17.9 (111)	MCG	preliminary final, 1993
37	15.9 (99)	Port Adelaide	16.11 (107)	Football Park	round 18, 2001
35	13.9 (87)	Gold Coast	16.16 (112)	Marrara Oval	round 12, 2023
34	9.12 (66)	Port Adelaide	14.14 (98)	Football Park	round 4, 2011
33	10.13 (73)	West Coast	13.7 (87)	Adelaide Oval	round 10, 2019

== Coaching records ==
^	Denotes current coach

Adelaide Crows Coaching Record
Coach	Seasons	Games	Wins	Draws	Losses	Win percentage	Grand finals
Neil Craig	2004–2011	166	92	0	74	55.42%	0
Matthew Nicks^	2020–	152	70	1	81	46.38%	0
Gary Ayres	2000–2004	107	55	0	52	51.40%	0
Don Pyke	2016–2019	93	56	1	36	60.75%	1
Graham Cornes	1991–1994	89	43	1	45	48.88%	0
Malcolm Blight	1997–1999	74	41	0	33	55.41%	2
Brenton Sanderson	2012–2014	69	39	0	30	56.52%	0
Robert Shaw	1995–1996	44	17	0	27	38.64%	0
Phil Walsh	2015	12	7	0	5	58.33%	0
Scott Camporeale	2015	11	7	0	4	63.64%	0
Mark Bickley	2011	6	3	0	3	50.00%	0
Scott Burns	2022	1	0	0	1	0.00%	0

== Attendances ==
=== Highest crowds ===
Adelaide Crows Highest Home Crowds
Attendance	Opponent	Venue	Game
54,283	Collingwood	Adelaide Oval	round 23, 2025
53,141	Geelong	Adelaide Oval	round 8, 2019
53,045	Port Adelaide	Adelaide Oval	round 8, 2026
52,460	West Coast	Adelaide Oval	round 2, 2015
52,332	Greater Western Sydney	Adelaide Oval	round 24, 2026

Adelaide Crows Highest Away Crowds
Attendance	Opponent	Venue	Game
67,697	Collingwood	MCG	round 10, 2025
65,920	Collingwood	MCG	round 11, 2023
63,925	Collingwood	MCG	round 15, 2024
62,482	Collingwood	MCG	round 1, 2026
55,010	Fremantle	Perth Stadium	round 23, 2026

=== Lowest crowds ===
Adelaide Crows Lowest Home Crowds (2025) (Note: Excludes COVID-19 affected crowds of 2020 and 2021.)
Attendance	Opponent	Venue	Game
22,859	West Coast	Adelaide Oval	round 12, 2022
23,063	Sydney	Football Park	round 15, 2011
24,684	Western Bulldogs	Football Park	round 4, 2013
25,597	Fitzroy	Football Park	round 19, 1992
26,426	West Coast	Football Park	round 15, 2013

Adelaide Crows Lowest Away Crowds (2025)
Attendance	Opponent	Venue	Game
4,603	Brisbane Bears	Carrara Oval	round 21, 1992
5,072	North Melbourne	Bellerive Oval	round 15, 2022
5,365	North Melbourne	Bellerive Oval	round 7, 2024
5,830	Greater Western Sydney	Sydney Showground Stadium	round 7, 2013
6,989	Melbourne	Traeger Park	round 10, 2018

=== Highest finals crowds ===
Adelaide Crows Highest Finals Crowds (2025)
Attendance	H/A	Opponent	Venue	Game
100,021	—N/a	Richmond	MCG	GF, 2017
99,645	—N/a	St Kilda	MCG	GF, 1997
94,431	—N/a	North Melbourne	MCG	GF, 1998
88,960	A	Collingwood	MCG	PF, 2002
76,380	A	Essendon	MCG	PF, 1993

=== Lowest finals crowds ===
Adelaide Crows Lowest Finals Crowds (2025)
Attendance	H/A	Opponent	Venue	Game
31,742	H	Fremantle	Football Park	SF, 2012
31,854	A	Brisbane Lions	The Gabba	QF, 2002
32,432	A	Brisbane Lions	The Gabba	SF, 2003
36,026	A	Brisbane Lions	The Gabba	SF, 2026
36,534	A	Hawthorn	Docklands Stadium	EF, 2007

== Venues ==
^	Denotes active AFL venue as of 2026.

Adelaide's win–loss records by venue (2025)
Venue	Played	Wins	Draws	Losses	Win percentage
Football Park	280	180	0	100	64.29%
Adelaide Oval^	162	97	1	64	64.3%
MCG^	84	33	1	50	39.9%
Docklands Stadium^	76	39	0	37	51.32%
Subiaco Oval	34	12	0	22	35.29%
The Gabba^	29	13	0	18	41.9%
Kardinia Park^	25	3	0	22	12.0%
SCG^	25	15	0	10	60.0%
Princes Park	23	6	0	17	26.09%
Carrara Stadium^	19	12	0	7	63.16%
Waverley Park	14	5	1	8	39.29%
Perth Stadium^	10	4	0	6	40.0%
York Park^	9	2	0	7	22.2%
Sydney Showground Stadium^	6	3	0	3	50.00%
Victoria Park	6	0	0	6	0%
Bellerive Oval^	4	2	0	2	50.00%
Eureka Stadium	4	1	0	3	25.00%
Western Oval	4	1	0	3	25.00%
Marrara Oval^	3	2	0	1	66.67%
Manuka Oval^	2	0	0	2	0%
Moorabbin Oval	2	0	0	2	0%
WACA Ground	2	0	0	2	0%
Cazaly's Stadium	1	1	0	0	100.00%
Traeger Park^	1	0	0	1	0%
Windy Hill	1	0	0	1	0%
Totals	828	431	3	394	52.23%

== Streaks ==
=== Consecutive games won ===
Games	Commenced		Concluded	
Games	Opponent	Round	Opponent	Round
10	Richmond	round 13, 2005	West Coast	round 22, 2005
9	Richmond	round 16, 2025	North Melbourne	round 24, 2025
8	Gold Coast	round 9, 2016	Collingwood	round 17, 2016
8	Carlton	round 9, 2006	North Melbourne	round 16, 2006
7	Carlton	round 9, 2009	Fremantle	round 15, 2009

=== Consecutive games lost ===
Games	Commenced		Concluded	
Games	Opponent	Round	Opponent	Round
16	West Coast	round 19, 2019	Geelong	round 13, 2020
9	Brisbane Lions	round 19, 1999	Brisbane Lions	round 5, 2000
7	Collingwood	semi final, 2009	Port Adelaide	round 6, 2010
6	Brisbane Lions	round 20, 2000	Port Adelaide	round 3, 2001
6	Collingwood	round 9, 2011	Geelong	round 14, 2011

=== Consecutive games scoring 100+ ===
Games	Commenced		Concluded	
Games	Opponent	Round	Opponent	Round
7	Gold Coast	round 9, 2016	Carlton	round 16, 2016
6	Greater Western Sydney	round 1, 2017	Richmond	round 6, 2017
5	Sydney	round 1, 1996	North Melbourne	round 5, 1996
5	St Kilda	round 12, 2006	North Melbourne	round 16, 2006

=== Consecutive games conceding 100+ ===
Games	Commenced		Concluded	
Games	Opponent	Round	Opponent	Round
6	North Melbourne	round 22, 1999	Brisbane Lions	round 5, 2000
6	Collingwood	round 9, 2011	Geelong	round 14, 2011
5	West Coast	round 10, 1992	Essendon	round 14, 1992
5	Footscray	round 9, 1996	Melbourne	round 13, 1996

== Player records ==
=== Most games played ===
^	Denotes current player

Rank	Player	Games	Kicks	Marks	Handballs	Disposals	Goals	Behinds
1	Andrew McLeod	340	4440	1057	2284	6724	275	196
2	Tyson Edwards	321	3758	1441	2336	6094	192	125
3	Taylor Walker	319	2793	1721	1193	3986	715	441
4	Mark Ricciuto	312	3984	1369	2585	6569	292	222
5	Ben Hart	311	3086	1082	1186	4272	45	40
6	Rory Laird^	289	3712	1384	3989	7695	32	47
7	Nigel Smart	278	2503	844	1553	4056	116	104
8	Simon Goodwin	275	3326	1098	2417	5743	162	135
9	Brodie Smith	273	3486	1152	1785	5271	74	79
10	Mark Bickley	272	3163	886	2314	5477	77	90

=== Players by age ===
Oldest

Player	Age	Round
Taylor Walker	36 years, 140 days	24, 2026
Nigel Smart	35 years, 30 days	13, 2004
Darren Jarman	34 years, 223 days	EF, 2001
Scott Thompson	34 years, 115 days	16, 2017
Mark Bickley	34 years, 39 days	SF, 2003

Youngest

Player	Age	Round
Ben Hart	17 years, 257 days	1, 1992
Lance Picioane	17 years, 294 days	1, 1998
Mark Ricciuto	17 years, 326 days	1, 1993
Hayden Skipworth	18 years, 35 days	1, 2001
Brenton Sanderson	18 years, 59 days	6, 1992

=== Players by height ===
Tallest

Player	Height	Appearances
Lachlan McAndrew^	210 cm	2026–present
Romano Negri	204 cm	1991–1992
Kieran Strachan	204 cm	2020–2024
Shaun Rehn	203 cm	1991–2000
Reilly O'Brien^	202 cm	2016–present

Shortest

Player	Height	Appearances
Eddie Hocking	168 cm	1991
Ian Callinan	171 cm	2011–2013
Joshua Mail	172 cm	1994
Tyson Stengle	172 cm	2019–2020
David Brown	172 cm	1991–1996

== Goalkicking records ==
=== Leading career goalkickers for Adelaide ===
Player	Adelaide goals	Average
Taylor Walker	715	2.24
Tony Modra	440 (588 AFL total)	3.73
Eddie Betts	310 (640 AFL total)	2.35
Josh Jenkins	296	2.01
Mark Ricciuto	292	0.94
Andrew McLeod	275	0.81
Scott Welsh	270 (363 AFL total)	2.09
Darren Jarman	264 (597 AFL total)	2.18
Brett Burton	264	1.49
Darcy Fogarty^	233	1.64

=== Most goals in a game ===
Goals	Player	Opponent	Round	Year	Venue
13.4	Tony Modra	Richmond	16	1993	Football Park
13.3	Tony Modra	Carlton	1	1994	Football Park
11.4	Scott Hodges	Geelong	23	1992	Football Park
10.3	Tony Modra	Richmond	1	1993	MCG
10.2	Taylor Walker	West Coast Eagles	13	2023	Adelaide Oval
10.2	Tom Lynch	Greater Western Sydney	7	2013	Sydney Showground Stadium
10.1	Tony Modra	North Melbourne	8	1993	Football Park
9.4	Taylor Walker	West Coast Eagles	24	2023	Perth Stadium
9.0	Darren Jarman	Melbourne	13	1999	MCG

=== Most goals in a season ===
Goals	Player	Games	Average	Year
129	Tony Modra	23	5.61	1993
84	Tony Modra	25	3.36	1997
76	Taylor Walker^	22	3.45	2023
75	Eddie Betts	24	3.13	2016
75	Tony Modra	19	3.95	1996

== Statistical records ==
^	Denotes current player
#	Denotes AFL record

=== Disposals ===
Rank	Most Career Disposals		Most Disposals in a Season			Most Disposals in a Game		
Rank	Player	Disposals	Player	Disposals	Year	Player	Disposals	Round
1	Rory Laird^	7,695	Matt Crouch	825	2017	Scott Thompson	51	22, 2011
2	Scott Thompson	6,752	Scott Thompson	737	2012	Matt Crouch	47	23, 2019
3	Andrew McLeod	6,724	Rory Laird^	736	2017	Matt Crouch	46	22, 2018
4	Mark Ricciuto	6,569	Chris McDermott	720	1992	Matt Crouch	45	23, 2017
5	Tyson Edwards	6,093	Rory Laird^	704	2021	Mark Bickley	44	11, 1993

=== Kicks ===
Rank	Most Career Kicks		Most Kicks in a Season			Most Kicks in a Game		
Rank	Player	Kicks	Player	Kicks	Year	Player	Kicks	Round
1	Andrew McLeod	4,440	Tony McGuinness	477	1993	Darren Jarman	31	10, 1996
2	Mark Ricciuto	3,984	Scott Thompson	410	2012	Tony McGuinness	31	23, 1992
3	Tyson Edwards	3,758	Jordan Dawson^	408	2022	Simon Tregenza	30	18, 1991
4	Rory Laird^	3,712	Andrew McLeod	408	2001	Brett Burton	30	13, 2003
5	Scott Thompson	3,499	Jordan Dawson^	401	2023	Matthew Connell	30	18, 2000

=== Handballs ===
Rank	Most Career Handballs		Most Handballs in a Season			Most Handballs in a Game		
Rank	Player	Handballs	Player	Handballs	Year	Player	Handballs	Round
1	Rory Laird^	3,984	Matt Crouch	480	2017	Matt Crouch	35#	22, 2018
2	Scott Thompson	3,253	Rory Laird^	390	2021	Scott Thompson	30	22, 2011
3	Matt Crouch	2,775	Rory Laird^	375	2023	Rory Laird^	30	14, 2022
4	Rory Sloane	2,745	Rory Laird^	375	2022	Rory Laird^	29	17, 2022
5	Mark Ricciuto	2,585	Rory Laird^	369	2017	Brad Crouch	29	23, 2017

=== Marks ===
Rank	Most Career Marks		Most Marks in a Season			Most Marks in a Game		
Rank	Player	Marks	Player	Marks	Year	Player	Marks	Round
1	Taylor Walker	1,721	Nathan Bassett	172	2006	Nathan Bassett	22	18, 2006
2	Tyson Edwards	1,441	Taylor Walker	171	2015	Daniel Talia	17	11, 2016
3	Rory Laird^	1,384	Tom Lynch	163	2017	Nathan Bock	16	8, 2010
4	Mark Ricciuto	1,369	Tony Modra	163	1993	Nathan Bock	16	12, 2008
5	Ben Rutten	1,205	Nathan Bock	162	2008	Ben Rutten	16	8, 2010

=== Tackles ===
Rank	Most Career Tackles		Most Tackles in a Season			Most Tackles in a Game		
Rank	Player	Tackles	Player	Tackles	Year	Player	Tackles	Round
1	Rory Sloane	1,397	Rory Sloane	186	2017	Rory Laird^	20#	18, 2022
2	Scott Thompson	1,312	Jordan Dawson^	184	2025	Sam Berry^	19	8, 2026
3	Rory Laird^	1,127	Rory Laird^	175	2023	Sam Berry^	17	18, 2022
4	Richard Douglas	870	Sam Berry^	171	2022	Rory Laird^	16	11, 2023
5	Tyson Edwards	830	Sam Berry^	167	2026	Brad Crouch	16	17, 2019

=== Hit-outs ===
Rank	Most Career Hit-outs		Most Hit-outs in a Season			Most Hit-outs in a Game		
Rank	Player	Hit-outs	Player	Hit-outs	Year	Player	Hit-outs	Round
1	Sam Jacobs	6,273	Sam Jacobs	996	2017	Sam Jacobs	74	8, 2017
2	Reilly O'Brien^	5,237	Reilly O'Brien^	972	2025	Reilly O'Brien^	63	10, 2023
3	Matthew Clarke	2,356	Reilly O'Brien^	898	2024	Sam Jacobs	61	15, 2012
4	Shaun Rehn	2,026	Reilly O'Brien^	888	2023	Reilly O'Brien^	58	23, 2024
5	Rhett Biglands	1,987	Sam Jacobs	859	2015	Reilly O'Brien^	56	10, 2024

== Brownlow records ==
Updated to the end of 2025

^	Denotes current player

=== Brownlow Medal winners ===
- 2003: Mark Ricciuto (22 votes, tied with Nathan Buckley and Adam Goodes)

=== Most prolific Brownlow pollers ===
Total votes

Rank	Player	Total votes
1	Scott Thompson	152
2	Mark Ricciuto	146
3	Andrew McLeod	144
4	Rory Sloane	108
5	Rory Laird^	105

Average votes

Rank	Player	Average votes per game
1	Jordan Dawson^	0.74
2	Patrick Dangerfield	0.66
3	Scott Thompson	0.60
4	Shaun Rehn	0.54
5	Mark Ricciuto	0.49

=== Most votes in a season ===
Rank	Player	Votes	Year
1	Jordan Dawson^	27	2025
2	Scott Thompson	25	2012
3	Rory Sloane	24	2016
4	Mark Ricciuto	23	2004
4	Patrick Dangerfield	23	2012
