= Jack Viney =

Australian rules footballer (born 1994)

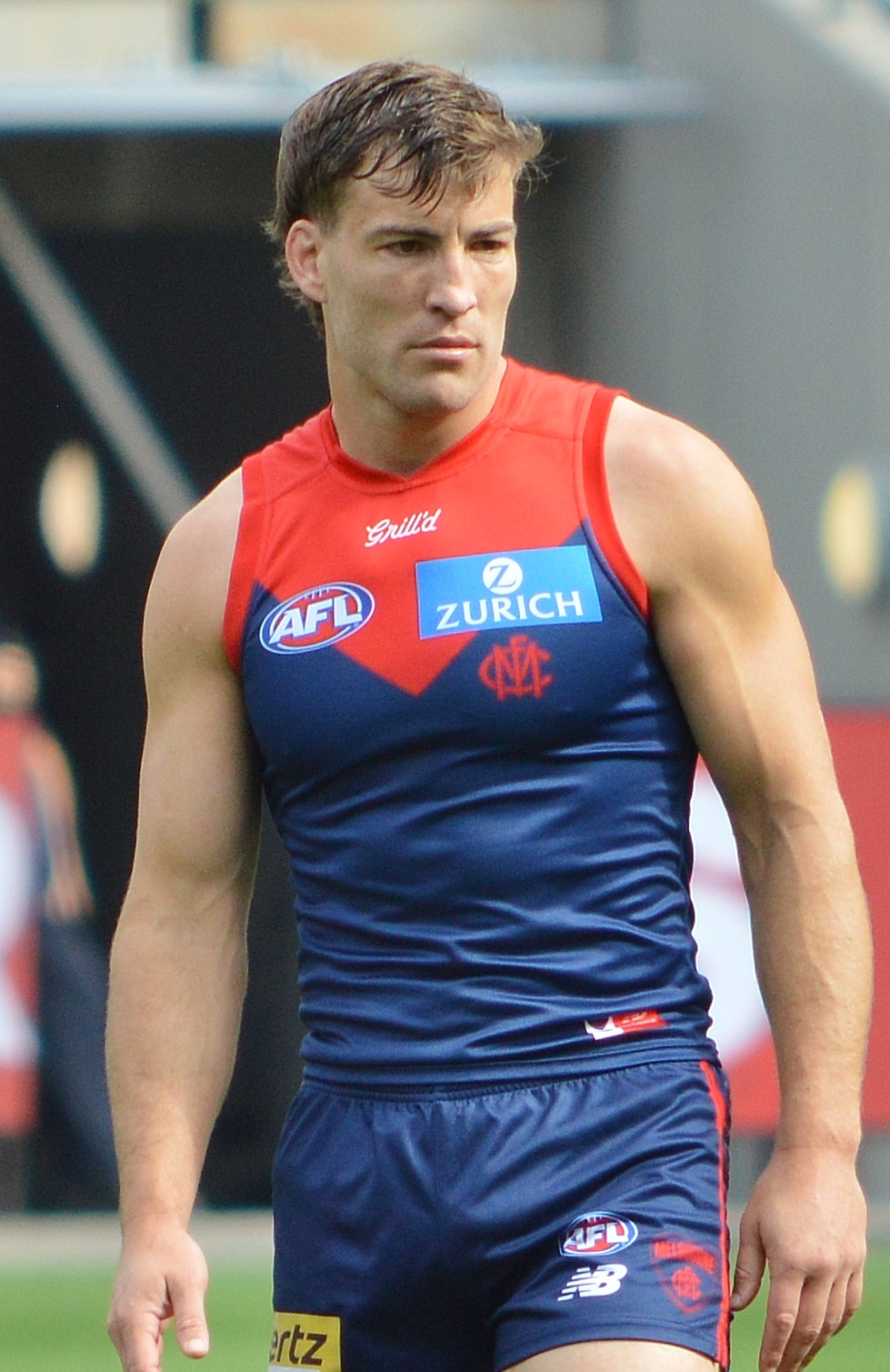
- Viney playing for Melbourne in 2025

Personal information
- Full name: Jack Viney
- Born: 13 April 1994 (age 32); Melbourne, Victoria
- Original team: Casey Scorpions (VFL)
- Draft: No. 26 (F/S), 2012 national draft
- Debut: Round 1, 2013, Melbourne vs. Port Adelaide, at the Melbourne Cricket Ground
- Height: 179 cm (5 ft 10 in)
- Weight: 84 kg (185 lb)
- Position: Midfielder

Club information
- Current club: West Coast
- Number: 15

Playing career^{1}
Years	Club	Games (Goals)
2013–2026	Melbourne	238 (70)
2027–	West Coast	0 (0)
Total		238 (70)
- ^{1} Playing statistics correct to the end of the 2026 season.

Career highlights
- AFL premiership player: 2021; Melbourne co-captain: 2017–2019; 2x Keith 'Bluey' Truscott Trophy: 2016, 2024; Neale Daniher Trophy: 2023; Frank 'Checker' Hughes Medal: 2023; AFL Rising Star nominee: 2013

Jack Viney (born 13 April 1994) is a professional Australian rules footballer playing for the West Coast Eagles in the Australian Football League (AFL). A midfielder, 1.78 metres (5 ft 10 in) tall and weighing 86 kilograms (190 lb), Viney is capable of contributing as both an inside and outside midfielder. He played top-level football at a young age playing in the first XVIII at Prince Alfred College at fifteen and was a bottom-aged player in the TAC Cup for the Oakleigh Chargers. His father, Todd Viney, is a former Melbourne captain and Jack followed in his footsteps when he was drafted by Melbourne with the twenty-sixth pick in the 2012 AFL draft under the father–son rule. He made his debut in 2013, receiving a nomination for the AFL Rising Star and was awarded the Harold Ball Memorial Trophy. He was named as Melbourne's best and fairest player in 2016 and 2024, winning the Keith 'Bluey' Truscott Trophy. In 2017, he became Melbourne co-captain alongside Nathan Jones, captaining the club for three seasons.

== Early life ==
Viney was born to Todd and Meg Viney in Melbourne, Victoria; his father played 233 games with the Melbourne Football Club and is a former captain, two-time Keith 'Bluey' Truscott Medallist, Melbourne Hall of Fame member, a part of Melbourne's Team of the Century and a one-time caretaker coach for five matches in 2011. He played his junior football with the Ashburton Redbacks and would often play in the grade above his age group due to being "too rough". He played alongside future AFL stars Toby Greene and Tom Mitchell. He also spent part of his childhood in Echuca, where he befriended future Brownlow Medal winner Ollie Wines.

Viney moved to Adelaide, South Australia in 2009 after his father became an assistant coach at the Adelaide Football Club and he attended Prince Alfred College for years nine and ten. In his first year at Prince Alfred, he was invited to train with the first XVIII football team and he became only the second year-nine student to play with the first XVIII in the school's 147-year history. He received state-honours in the 2010 under-16 championships by representing South Australia and captained the side to the winning title, he was also named the state's most valuable player. Through the AFL elite talent junior pathways, he received a scholarship with the Australian Institute of Sport (AIS) as part of the AIS-AFL Academy in the 2010 intake and travelled to Europe in April 2011 as part of 30-man squad. In November 2010, he signed a five-year contract with Melbourne ensuring he would be drafted by them in the 2012 AFL draft under the father–son rule.

At his age, not many boys have that real aggressive streak and that unwavering competitive level.

— Greg Doyle, Oakleigh Chargers coach

Returning to the city of Melbourne in 2011, Viney attended Carey Baptist Grammar School and played for the Oakleigh Chargers in the TAC Cup as a bottom-aged player. He represented Victoria Metro in the 2011 AFL Under 18 Championships and despite being one of the youngest players, he was lauded for his leadership on and off the field. He played eight matches for Oakleigh in 2011 including the losing grand final to the Sandringham Dragons, in which he was named best-on-ground; his coach, Greg Doyle, praised Viney for his physicality and readiness to play senior football at seventeen years of age. He was named in the level two squad for the 2011 intake in the AIS-AFL Academy, and was commended for his performance in the Academy match against the Box Hill at the Melbourne Cricket Ground in March 2012, after recording sixteen disposals, including ten contested, six tackles and six clearances.

Viney received permission to play in the Victorian Football League (VFL) in 2012 for Melbourne's affiliate team, the Casey Scorpions; he suffered a broken jaw in two places during his debut match after a high-bump from then-Geelong player, David Wojcinski; in a separate incident, Wojcinski was charged with striking Viney, which resulted in an overall four-match suspension. Viney received mid-year state honours and represented Victoria Metro in the 2012 AFL Under 18 Championships, he missed the start of the championships through his jaw injury and played in the final two rounds of the championships, including the winning final against Western Australia.

== AFL career ==
=== 2013 season ===
He's a tenacious, fearless, hard player...He's going to bring a lot of people a lot of joy at this footy club

— Neil Craig, former Melbourne caretaker coach

Viney was rated by recruiters as the "sixth to eight best player" heading into the 2012 AFL draft, however, under the father–son bidding system, speculation grew that the Gold Coast Football Club would bid their first round pick in the draft, the second overall, forcing Melbourne to match the bid with the third overall selection. Gold Coast ultimately chose not to bid pick two on Viney, and after the Port Adelaide Football Club bid their first round selection on him, Melbourne matched the bid with their second round pick, and recruited him with their second selection and twenty-sixth overall in the 2012 national draft. Viney made his debut in the first round of 2013 against Port Adelaide at the Melbourne Cricket Ground, despite losing the match by seventy-nine points and the team being labelled as "embarrassing", Viney was praised by the media for his performance in the match and his leadership on and off the field. After the ninety-five point loss against Fremantle in round twenty-one at the Melbourne Cricket Ground, he received the round nomination for the Rising Star where he recorded twenty-eight disposals, five tackles, five marks, four clearances and a goal. He was praised by then-Melbourne caretaker coach, Neil Craig, for his competitive mindset and Craig drew comparisons between Viney's mindset and 2016 Brownlow Medallist, Patrick Dangerfield's. He managed thirteen matches in his debut season after missing eight matches in the middle of the season through a toe injury. His season was rewarded with the Harold Ball Memorial Trophy as Melbourne's best young player and he finished fourteenth overall in the best and fairest count.

=== 2014 season ===
Viney had a delayed start to the 2014 season after having an injury-interrupted pre-season due to foot and hip issues. He played his first match for the season in the thirty-two point loss against Greater Western Sydney in round three at Spotless Stadium. He received widespread news coverage during the season after an incident in round seven where he collided with Adelaide player, Tom Lynch, resulting in a broken jaw to Lynch. Viney was referred directly to the AFL Tribunal, bypassing the match review panel and the opportunity of an early plea. He was initially suspended for two-weeks with the rationale given by AFL legal counsel, Jeff Gleeson, that he could have "spun out" of the impending collision, rather than brace for contact. The outcome sparked backlash among past and present players and fans, including Australian Football Hall of Fame member, Dermott Brereton, who protested he would boycott the Hall of Fame events that year due to the "fundamentally wrong" direction the game was taking. The AFL chief executive officer at the time, Andrew Demetriou, weighed into the debate by stating Viney was very unlucky to be suspended. Melbourne announced their intention to appeal the ban and successfully had the suspension overturned, becoming only the second time an appeal was successful under the 2005–2014 AFL Tribunal system. The AFL released a statement two-weeks after the appeal stating the reason behind the overturned suspension was "because he didn’t bump Adelaide’s Tom Lynch but instead braced for contact." He played twenty matches for the season and finished eleventh in Melbourne's best and fairest count.

=== 2015 season ===
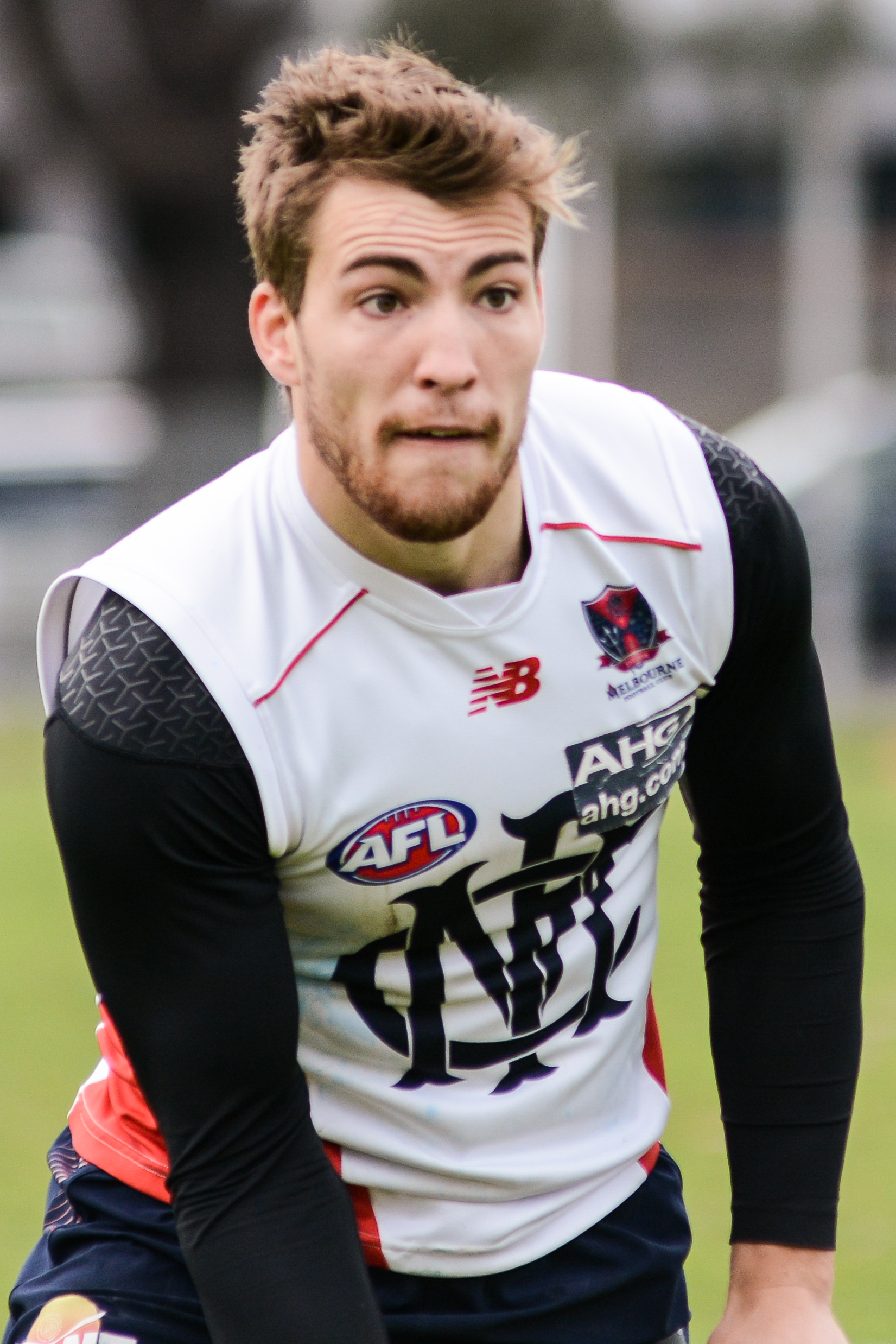
Viney at training in July 2015

He's a good little player...tough to play on. To be honest he's a real competitor. I've played with a few of them and he's the sort of player you want to play with.

— Joel Selwood, Geelong captain

Viney played in the first two matches for 2015 before fracturing his fibula in the round two loss to Greater Western Sydney at StarTrack Oval. He returned in round nine against Port Adelaide at TIO Traeger Park and played the remainder of the season. The season saw him move into a loose-tagging role and he was lauded for restricting the impact of Gary Ablett in the round one win against Gold Coast, and Joel Selwood in the round twelve win against Geelong, with the latter drawing praise from Gerard Healy who labelled Viney as the "new Brett Kirk". His season was rewarded with a second-place finish in the Keith 'Bluey' Truscott Medal, finishing one vote behind the winner, Bernie Vince, despite playing six less matches, he also received the Norm Smith Memorial Trophy (coaches award) and James McDonald Trophy (heart and spirit award) and it was labelled as his breakout season by Fox Sports Australia journalist, Adam Baldwin.

=== 2016 season ===
Heading into the 2016 season, Viney was added into Melbourne's leadership group and he stated his leadership style was to "lead by actions". In the opening round match against Greater Western Sydney, he played his fiftieth AFL match, in which he was named the best player on the ground by then-Melbourne coach Paul Roos, AFL Media and the Herald Sun, and recorded thirty-two disposals (fourteen contested), six tackles, five marks and four clearances in a two-point win. His first half of the season saw him in strong form, whereby he was placed fourth in the AFL Coaches Association champion player of the year leader board after round eight, he had featured in the AFL Media's team of the week in three out of four weeks between rounds four and seven, he had one of the largest rises in the league in the official AFL player ratings, he was named in The Age journalist Rohan Connolly's unofficial mid year All-Australian team, and was highly praised within the industry for his form. His performances in the first half of the season saw him sign a contract extension in May, linking him to the club until the end of 2020.

In the forty-five point loss in round ten against Port Adelaide at Traeger Park, Viney was suspended for one match for striking Port Adelaide midfielder, Brad Ebert, and in a separate incident, he fractured a knuckle bone which initially ruled him out for one month. After missing just the one week, he returned to the team in the forty-six point win against Collingwood in the annual Queen's Birthday clash in round twelve, in which he recorded thirty disposals, six marks, four tackles and a goal. He finished the season playing in twenty-one out of a possible twenty-two matches and averaged a career high 26.1 disposals, six clearances and seven tackles and ranked fourth in the AFL for tackles, sixth in centre clearances and eleventh in overall clearances. His season was rewarded with the Keith 'Bluey' Truscott Medal as the club best and fairest, finishing eight votes ahead of club captain, Nathan Jones and he was the recipient of the Ron Barassi Jnr Trophy (leadership award). In addition, he was named as one of the ruck rovers in the 22under22 team, he was selected in AFL Media's team of the week five times, he was labelled as a "premium midfielder" by ESPN journalists, Niall Seewang and Jake Michaels, and Nathan Jones, noted he was the "obvious choice" to be his successor as Melbourne captain.

=== 2017 season ===
Jack certainly plays in the same vein [as Joel Selwood]. You could argue his leadership credentials are probably stronger than Selwood's at the same age.

— Brad Sewell, two-time Hawthorn premiership player

Viney had a delayed start to the 2017 pre-season after requiring surgery on his hip at the end of the 2016 home and away season. On the eve of the JLT Community Series, he was announced as the co-captain of Melbourne alongside Nathan Jones with senior coach, Simon Goodwin, noting he is "a very talented player who role models exactly the core values we want in our playing group." With his father, Todd Viney, captaining the club in 1998 and 1999, it was the first time in club history a father and son have held the position on a permanent basis. The move to elevate Viney to co-captain was questioned by the media and public considering Viney's young age and the only other time Melbourne had co-captains was during very poor performed years from 2012 to 2014.

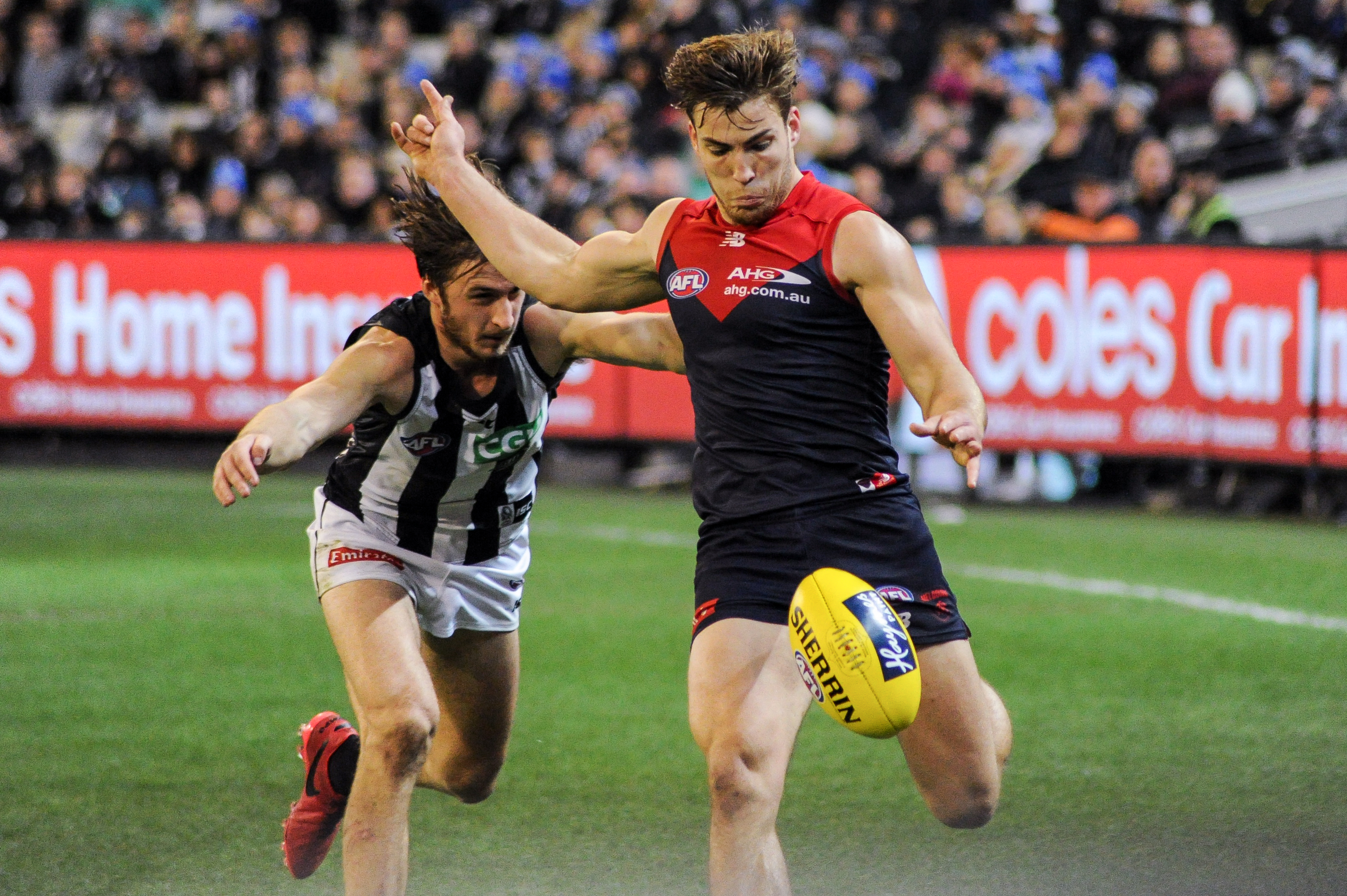
Viney kicking away from Tom Phillips during the Queen's Birthday match in round 12, 2017.

Following his strong 2016 season, AFL Media named him inside the top fifty players in the league and Fox Sports Australia journalist, Anna Harrington, predicted he would continue his linear improvement and is "the gun player" of Melbourne. Despite the positive expectation on him, he struggled for form early in the season and was criticised by former player and media personality, David King, for his performance in the thirteen point loss to Richmond at the Melbourne Cricket Ground in the Anzac Day eve match due to wasting energy with his aggression towards opposition players off the ball. Soon after, he found form and was named in AFL Media's team of the week in rounds seven, eight and twelve. He was praised in particular for his match against Collingwood in the Queen's Birthday clash, in which he recorded twenty disposals, ten contested possessions, three clearances and seven tackles to be named one of Melbourne's best players by Anna Harrington.

Two weeks later, he was the sole captain of Melbourne for the first time after Nathan Jones injured himself the week before and Viney helped the club defeat West Coast in Perth for the first time in fifteen seasons with a three point win. His performance in the match was labelled "the stuff of legend" by AFL Media's, David Reed. Despite injuring his shoulder in the third term and missing most of the quarter, he finished the match with thirty-eight disposals, twenty six contested possessions, nine clearances and a goal. His leadership drew high praise, with Simon Goodwin saying "he's just an incredible player around the contest and he was unbelievable as our skipper" and Viney drew comparisons to Joel Selwood and Michael Voss by Garry Lyon, Dennis Cometti and Brad Sewell. He received the maximum three Brownlow Medal votes in the match, meaning he was adjudged the best player on the ground by the field umpires and was named in AFL Media's team of the week. The next week in the thirty-five point loss to Sydney at the Melbourne Cricket Ground, he injured his foot which required surgery to his plantar fascia and he was ruled out of playing football for four to six weeks.

Viney missed just two matches and returned in the twenty-three point win against Port Adelaide at the Melbourne Cricket Ground in round eighteen, recording a game-high ten clearances, in addition to twenty-five disposals, seven tackles and six inside 50s which led to teammate, Dom Tyson, saying "he's just so important, he's our captain and you just walk that little bit taller when he's on the field with you" and he was named in AFL Media's team of the week for the fifth time in the season. He played the next three matches before pulling up sore in his foot during the twenty-four point win against St Kilda at the Melbourne Cricket Ground in round twenty-one. He was forced to miss the remaining two games of the season after the club missed finals by 0.5 percentage points. Playing eighteen matches for the season, he finished second in the club best and fairest and received the Ron Barassi Jnr Trophy (leadership award) for the second consecutive year. Despite the early season criticisms of Viney becoming co-captain, he received continual praise throughout the season for his leadership with Cameron Mooney predicting he could become one of the Melbourne's greatest captains and AFL Media journalist, Damien Barrett, said the choice to appoint co-captains was paying off.

== Personal life ==
Viney is currently studying a Bachelor of Commerce at Deakin University. In 2021, Viney was named as Deakin University's Male Sportsperson of the Year.

== Statistics ==
Updated to the end of the 2025 season.

Legend
G	Goals	K	Kicks	D	Disposals	T	Tackles
B	Behinds	H	Handballs	M	Marks
#	Played in that season's premiership team

Season	Team	No.	Games	Totals							Averages (per game)							Votes
Season	Team	No.	Games	G	B	K	H	D	M	T	G	B	K	H	D	M	T	Votes
2013	Melbourne	7	13	3	4	118	109	227	37	54	0.2	0.3	9.1	8.4	17.5	2.8	4.2	2
2014	Melbourne	7	20	5	7	187	210	397	56	87	0.3	0.4	9.4	10.5	19.9	2.8	4.4	0
2015	Melbourne	7	16	3	4	141	210	351	31	105	0.2	0.3	8.8	13.1	21.9	1.9	6.6	3
2016	Melbourne	7	21	8	2	224	324	548	72	148	0.4	0.1	10.7	15.4	26.1	3.4	7.0	14
2017	Melbourne	7	18	6	5	151	264	415	44	126	0.3	0.3	8.4	14.7	23.1	2.4	7.0	9
2018	Melbourne	7	10	2	2	87	158	245	25	59	0.2	0.2	8.7	15.8	24.5	2.5	5.9	4
2019	Melbourne	7	21	4	4	210	234	444	68	110	0.2	0.2	10.0	11.1	21.1	3.2	5.2	3
2020 (Note: The 2020 season was played with 17 home-and-away matches per team (down from 22) and 16-minute quarters with time on (down from 20-minute quarters with time on) due to the impact of the COVID-19 pandemic.)	Melbourne	7	16	5	4	167	150	317	40	68	0.3	0.3	10.4	9.4	19.8	2.5	4.3	6
2021^{#}	Melbourne	7	15	4	7	162	173	335	37	106	0.3	0.5	10.8	11.5	22.3	2.5	7.1	3
2022	Melbourne	7	22	8	3	256	309	565	62	126	0.4	0.1	11.6	14.0	25.7	2.8	5.7	7
2023	Melbourne	7	24	8	5	315	300	615	73	142	0.3	0.2	13.1	12.5	25.6	3.0	5.9	24
2024	Melbourne	7	23	10	4	258	226	484	60	143	0.4	0.2	11.2	9.8	21.0	2.6	6.2	8
2025	Melbourne	7	18	4	6	182	212	394	47	122	0.2	0.3	10.1	11.8	21.9	2.6	6.8	8
Career			237	70	57	2458	2879	5337	652	1396	0.3	0.2	10.4	12.1	22.5	2.8	5.9	91

== Honours and achievements ==
Team

- AFL premiership player (Melbourne): 2021
- AFL minor premiership (Melbourne): 2021
- McClelland Trophy (Melbourne): 2021, 2023

Individual

- Keith 'Bluey' Truscott Trophy: 2016
- Melbourne co-captain: 2017–2019
- 22under22 team: 2016
- 3× Sid Anderson Memorial Trophy (Melbourne B&F Runner-Up): 2015, 2017, 2019
- Harold Ball Memorial Trophy: 2013
- AFL Rising Star nominee: 2013 (Round 21)
