= Brodie Grundy =

Australian rules footballer (born 1994)

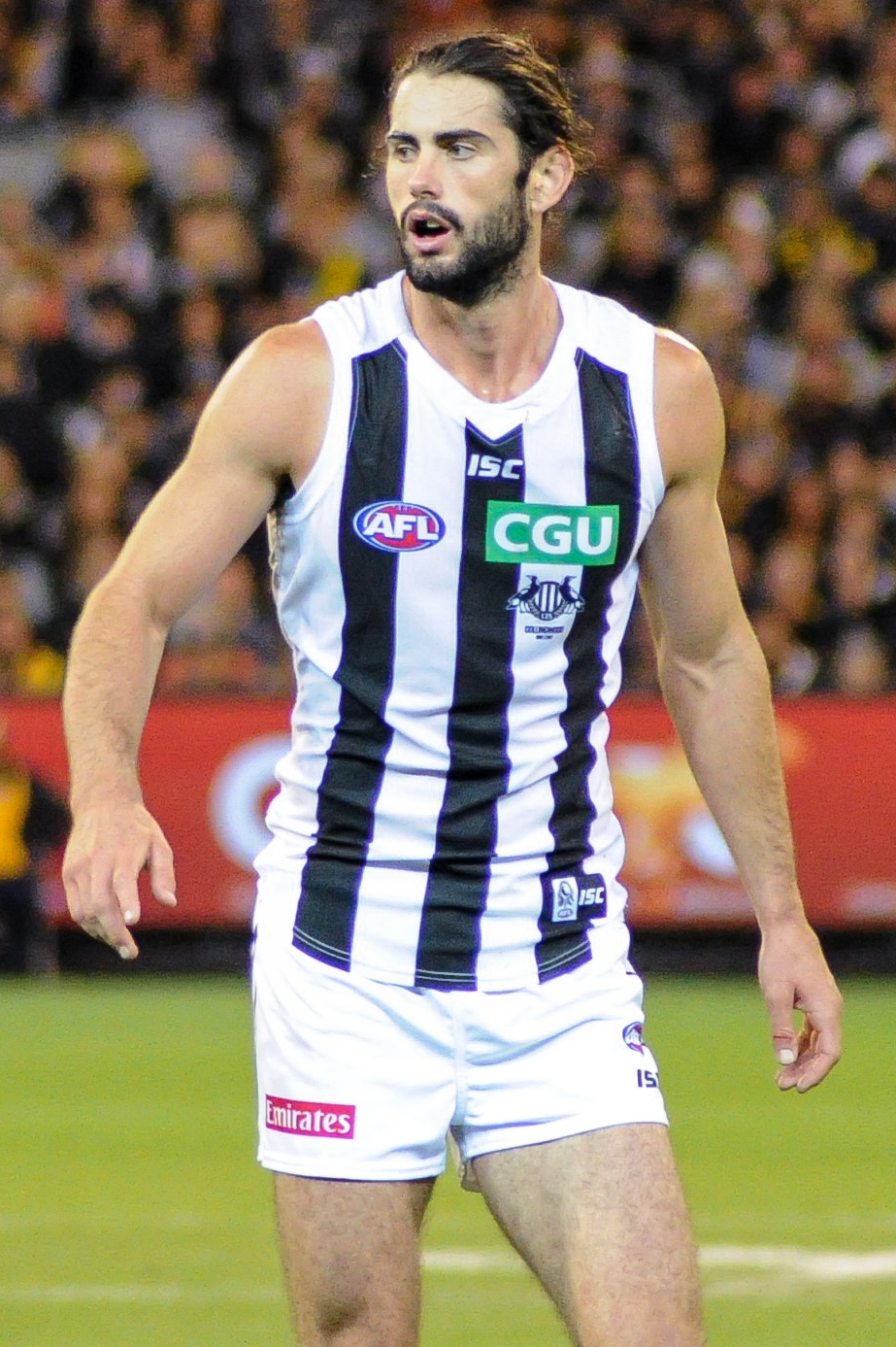
- Grundy playing for Collingwood in March 2017

Personal information
- Full name: Brodie Grundy
- Born: 15 April 1994 (age 32); Adelaide, South Australia
- Original team: Sturt (SANFL)
- Draft: No. 18, 2012 AFL draft, Collingwood
- Height: 202 cm (6 ft 8 in)
- Weight: 108 kg (238 lb)
- Position: Ruck

Club information
- Current club: Sydney
- Number: 4

Playing career^{1}
Years	Club	Games (Goals)
2013–2022	Collingwood	177 (60)
2023	Melbourne	17 (10)
2024–	Sydney	67 (18)
Total		260 (88)

Representative team honours
Years	Team	Games (Goals)
2020	All Stars	1 (0)
- ^{1} Playing statistics correct to the end of round 22, 2026.

Career highlights
- 2× All-Australian team: 2018, 2019; 2× Copeland Trophy: 2018, 2019; Herald Sun Player of the Year: 2018; 2× 22under22 team: 2015, 2016; 2013 AFL Rising Star nominee; Goodes–O'Loughlin Medal: 2026

Brodie Grundy (born 15 April 1994) is a professional Australian rules footballer playing for the Sydney Swans in the Australian Football League (AFL). He was previously an All-Australian and best-and-fairest winner with Collingwood, having been selected with the 18th draft pick in the 2012 AFL draft, as well as a player for Melbourne.

== Early life and junior football ==
Grundy was born in Adelaide, South Australia and attended Cabra Dominican College, a private Catholic high school in the southern suburbs of the city, graduating in 2011. A former basketball player, Grundy switched to Australian rules football in 2010. A premiership player for the Unley Jets Football club in the Under 16.5's 2010 Grand Final win over Edwardstown. Brodie has a younger brother, Riley, who was drafted to Port Adelaide with pick 73 in the 2018 draft.

== AFL career ==
=== Collingwood ===
Following a successful season playing as a ruckman with South Australian National Football League (SANFL) club Sturt's junior teams, Grundy was recruited by Collingwood with draft pick #18 in the 2012 AFL draft.

Grundy was the Round 22 nomination for the 2013 AFL Rising Star award.

In March 2014, Grundy signed a three-year contract extension lasting until the end of the 2017 AFL season.

In 2018 he won the Herald Sun Player of the Year award with 27 votes, one clear of Melbourne ruck Max Gawn and Hawthorn midfielder Tom Mitchell. Grundy also won the Copeland medal for Collingwood's best and fairest in 2018, drawing with Steele Sidebottom.

After another All-Australian season in 2019, Grundy signed a seven-year, $1 million per-year deal with Collingwood. However, Grundy struggled to recapture his All-Australian form in subsequent years, with his salary criticised by some media figures.

=== Melbourne ===
At the end of the 2022 AFL season, Collingwood traded Grundy to Melbourne for salary cap relief.

During the 2023 season, Grundy was often used by Melbourne as a forward in efforts to be able to play him and Max Gawn in the same lineup, a role Grundy, as a ruck, was unfamiliar and dissatisfied with. In the latter half of the year he was dropped to the VFL to play with the Casey Demons and was not selected in either of Melbourne's finals games.

=== Sydney Swans ===
Grundy sought a trade to the Sydney Swans at the conclusion of the season, despite only being in the first year of a five-year contract at the Demons. He was traded on 11 October.

Grundy had a successful 2025 season recapturing previous All-Australian form, recording more than 45 hitouts on 5 occasions including a 62 hitout performance in Round 19. Therefore talks in the media started about him, former teammate Max Gawn, and Tristan Xerri around the competition for the All-Australian ruck position. Grundy and Gawn made the All Australian squad however Grundy failed to reach the final All Australian team with Max Gawn taking out the ruck spot.

== Playing style ==
Despite playing as ruckman, Grundy is able to follow up his ruckwork and win the ball himself and apply tackles. He has been labelled as a ‘fourth midfielder’ by his teammates. In the 2018 season, he averaged 20.2 disposals per match; 525 for the season (48th in the AFL), easily the highest amongst ruckmen.

== Personal life ==
In December 2020, Grundy graduated from La Trobe University with a Bachelor of Health Sciences. He has since competed an MBA from Melbourne University.

== Statistics ==
Updated to the end of round 22, 2026.

Legend
G	Goals	K	Kicks	D	Disposals	T	Tackles
B	Behinds	H	Handballs	M	Marks	H/O	Hit-outs

Led the league after finals only
Led the league after season and finals

Season	Team	No.	Games	Totals								Averages (per game)								Votes
Season	Team	No.	Games	G	B	K	H	D	M	T	H/O	G	B	K	H	D	M	T	H/O	Votes
2013	Collingwood	35	7	1	3	35	53	88	18	22	151	0.1	0.4	5.0	7.6	12.6	2.6	3.1	21.6	0
2014	Collingwood	4	15	3	8	73	79	152	36	51	272	0.2	0.5	4.9	5.3	10.1	2.4	3.4	18.1	0
2015	Collingwood	4	19	8	3	156	137	293	66	85	462	0.4	0.2	8.2	7.2	15.4	3.5	4.5	24.3	0
2016	Collingwood	4	21	11	8	190	197	387	81	92	548	0.5	0.4	9.0	9.4	18.4	3.9	4.4	26.1	7
2017	Collingwood	4	20	4	5	166	201	367	73	78	714	0.2	0.3	8.3	10.1	18.4	3.7	3.9	35.7	2
2018	Collingwood	4	26	9	8	206	319	525	92	134	1039	0.3	0.3	7.9	12.3	20.2	3.5	5.2	40.0	17
2019	Collingwood	4	24	7	11	237	274	511	105	104	1022	0.3	0.5	9.9	11.4	21.3	4.4	4.3	42.6	23
2020 (Note: The 2020 season was played with 17 home-and-away matches per team (down from 22) and 16-minute quarters with time on (down from 20-minute quarters with time on) due to the impact of the COVID-19 pandemic.)	Collingwood	4	19	3	3	105	168	273	57	69	598	0.2	0.2	5.5	8.8	14.4	3.0	3.6	31.5	6
2021	Collingwood	4	20	12	6	185	197	382	72	84	647	0.6	0.3	9.3	9.9	19.1	3.6	4.2	32.4	9
2022	Collingwood	4	6	2	0	53	48	101	15	23	182	0.3	0.0	8.8	8.0	16.8	2.5	3.8	30.3	1
2023	Melbourne	6	17	10	4	100	143	243	46	49	349	0.6	0.2	5.9	8.4	14.3	2.7	2.9	20.5	0
2024	Sydney	4	26	2	3	180	289	469	59	121	837	0.1	0.1	6.9	11.1	18.0	2.3	4.7	32.2	1
2025	Sydney	4	22	7	5	160	268	428	74	85	807	0.3	0.2	7.3	12.2	19.5	3.4	3.9	36.7	6
2026	Sydney	4	19	9	7	133	246	379	39	76	670	0.5	0.4	7.0	12.9	19.9	2.1	4.0	35.3	0
Career			261	88	74	1979	2619	4598	833	1073	8298	0.3	0.3	7.6	10.0	17.6	3.2	4.1	31.8	72

== Honours and achievements ==
Team

- Minor Premiership (Sydney): (2024)
- 2x McClelland Trophy (Melbourne): (2023), (Sydney): (2026)

Individual

- Herald Sun Player of the Year: 2018
- 2× Copeland Trophy: 2018, 2019
- 2× All-Australian team: 2018, 2019
- All Stars Representative Honours in Bushfire Relief Match: 2020
- AFL Rising Star nominee: 2013 (round 22)
- Goodes–O'Loughlin Medal: 2026
