= Sam Mayes =

Australian rules footballer (born 1994)

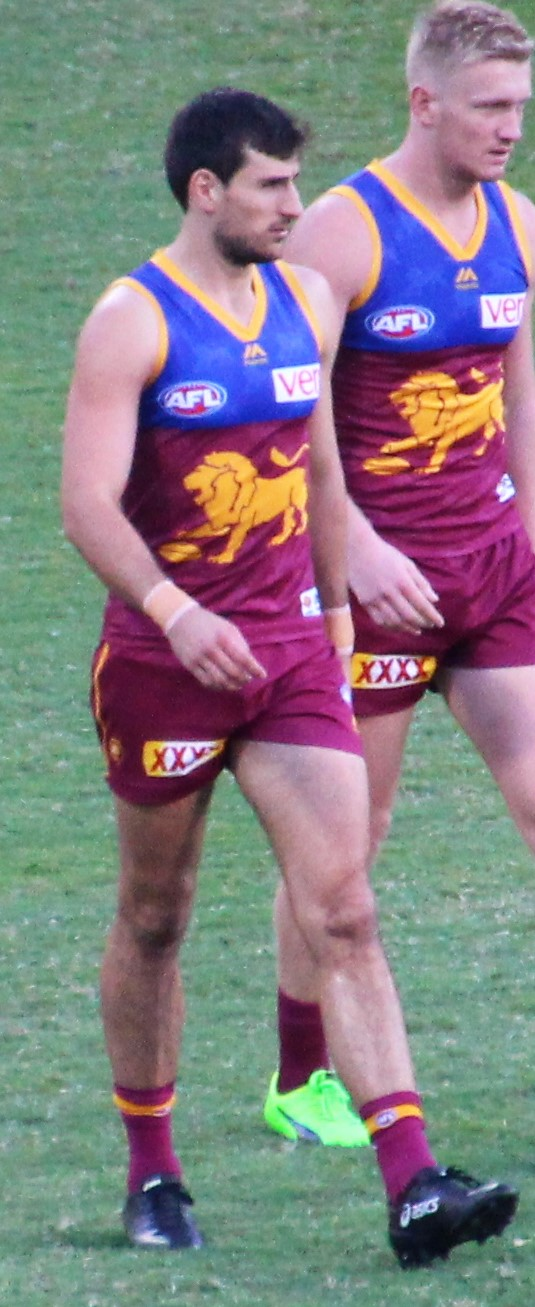
- Mayes (left) with Brisbane in April 2017

Personal information
- Born: 20 May 1994 (age 32); Port Pirie, South Australia, Australia
- Original team: North Adelaide (SANFL)
- Draft: No. 8, 2012 national draft
- Height: 187 cm (6 ft 2 in)
- Weight: 86 kg (13 st 8 lb; 190 lb)
- Position: Midfielder

Playing career^{1}
Years	Club	Games (Goals)
2013–2018	Brisbane Lions	101 (26)
2019–2022	Port Adelaide	20 (8)
Total		121 (34)
- ^{1} Playing statistics correct to the end of 2022.

Career highlights
- Rising Star nominee: 2013

Sam Mayes (born 20 May 1994) is a former Australian rules footballer who played with the Brisbane Lions and the Port Adelaide Football Club in the Australian Football League (AFL).

== AFL career ==
=== Brisbane (2013–2018) ===
Mayes made his AFL debut for Brisbane in the Round 3 match against Gold Coast in the 2013 AFL season. Mayes was nominated for the 2013 AFL Rising Star after his performance in round 12 against Fremantle, and the following week featured in the famous "Miracle on Grass" match against Geelong. He kicked a career-high four goals against the Cats in 2014.

At the conclusion of the 2018 season, Mayes sought a trade back to South Australia, and was traded to Port Adelaide on 17 October.

=== Port Adelaide (2019–2022) ===
After failing to perform in 2019, Mayes did not appear for the Power in his first season at the club. However, he helped the Port Adelaide Magpies to the 2019 SANFL Grand Final while playing for Port Adelaide's reserves team.

Mayes played his first game for Port Adelaide in Round 7 of the 2020 AFL season in a win against Carlton. He was suspended for one game for a bump on Western Bulldogs's Josh Dunkley a few weeks later.

Despite being delisted at the end of the 2021 season, Mayes was taken in the rookie draft by the Power to remain on the AFL list. In the round 3, 2022 Showdown against Adelaide, Mayes kicked two goals, but in the dying seconds conceded the free kick which led to Jordan Dawson's goal after the siren to sink the Power. Mayes was not offered a new contract at the conclusion of the 2022 AFL season.

== Statistics ==
Statistics are correct to end of 2022

Legend
G	Goals	K	Kicks	D	Disposals	T	Tackles
B	Behinds	H	Handballs	M	Marks

Season	Team	No.	Games	Totals							Averages (per game)							Votes
Season	Team	No.	Games	G	B	K	H	D	M	T	G	B	K	H	D	M	T	Votes
2013	Brisbane Lions	32	18	12	5	198	103	301	87	45	0.7	0.3	11.0	5.7	16.7	4.8	2.5	5
2014	Brisbane Lions	32	21	11	11	192	159	351	92	47	0.5	0.5	9.1	7.6	16.7	4.4	2.2	0
2015	Brisbane Lions	32	14	2	5	108	94	202	68	28	0.1	0.4	7.7	6.7	14.4	4.9	2.0	0
2016	Brisbane Lions	32	21	1	1	239	132	371	88	45	0.0	0.0	11.4	6.3	17.7	4.2	2.1	0
2017	Brisbane Lions	32	21	0	1	270	170	440	127	38	0.0	0.0	12.9	8.1	21.0	6.0	1.8	0
2018	Brisbane Lions	32	6	0	1	51	46	97	24	9	0.0	0.2	8.5	7.7	16.2	4.0	1.5	0
2019	Port Adelaide	32	0	–	–	–	–	–	–	–	–	–	–	–	–	–	–	–
2020	Port Adelaide	32	6	1	2	50	32	82	20	17	0.2	0.3	8.3	5.3	13.7	3.3	2.8	0
2021	Port Adelaide	32	11	5	3	35	35	70	17	20	0.5	0.3	3.2	3.2	6.4	1.6	1.8	0
2022	Port Adelaide	32	3	2	4	9	4	13	5	3	0.7	1.3	3.0	1.3	4.3	1.7	1.0	0
Career			121	34	33	1152	775	1927	528	252	0.3	0.3	9.5	6.4	15.9	4.3	2.1	5
