= Sam Berry (footballer) =

Australian rules footballer

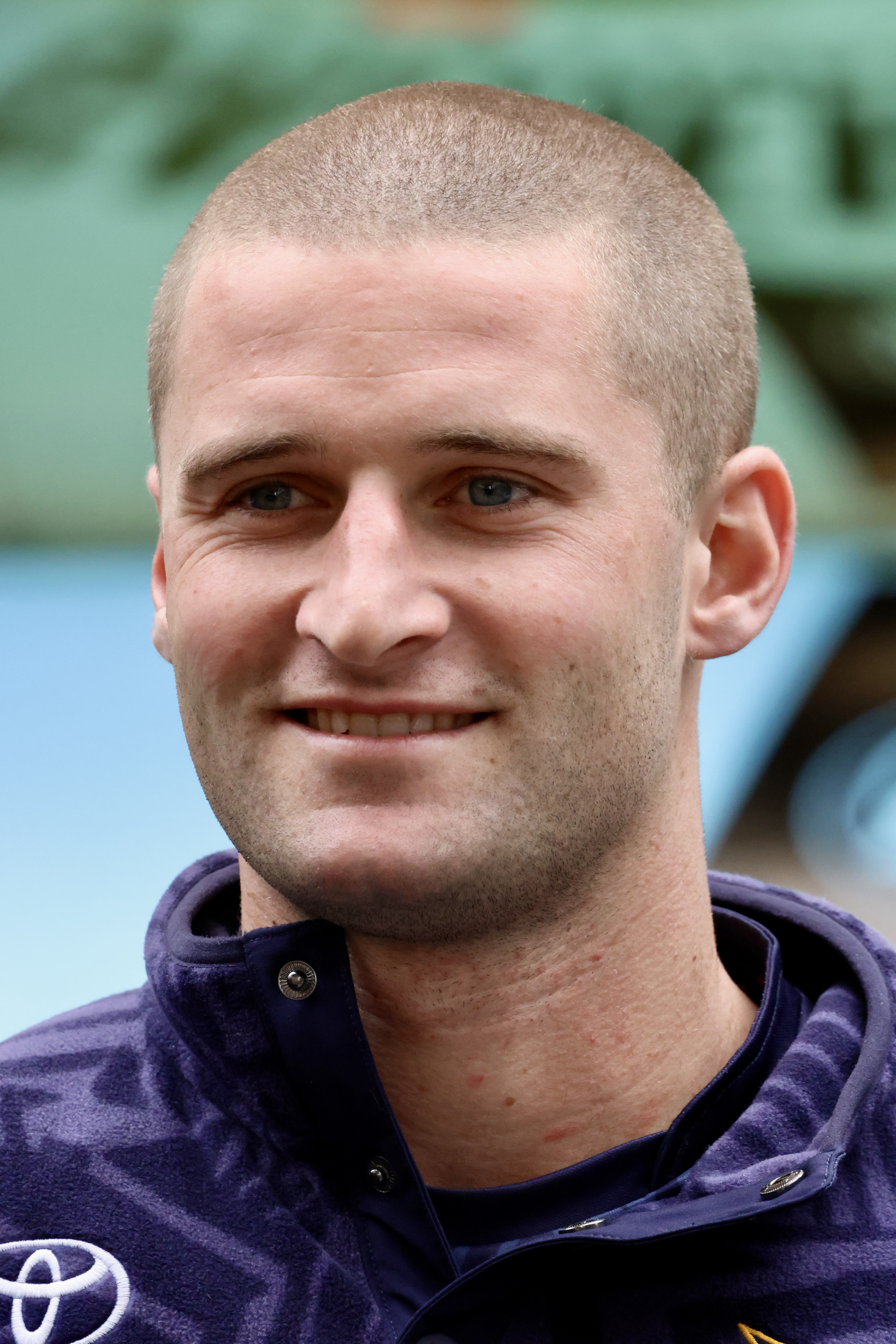
- Berry at the 2026 Gather Round

Personal information
- Full name: Samuel Berry
- Nicknames: Bez, Dingle
- Born: 12 February 2002 (age 24); Gippsland, Victoria
- Original teams: Gippsland Power (NAB League); Melbourne Grammar (APS); Maffra Eagles
- Draft: No. 28, 2020 national draft
- Debut: Round 1, 2021, Adelaide vs. Geelong, at Adelaide Oval
- Height: 181 cm (5 ft 11 in)
- Weight: 83 kg (183 lb)
- Position: Midfielder

Club information
- Current club: Adelaide
- Number: 3

Playing career^{1}
Years	Club	Games (Goals)
2021–	Adelaide	96 (20)
- ^{1} Playing statistics correct to the end of round 22, 2026.

Career highlights
- Showdown Medal: 2026

Sam Berry (born 12 February 2002) is a professional Australian rules footballer who plays for the Adelaide Football Club in the Australian Football League (AFL). He was drafted with the 28th selection in the 2020 AFL draft.

== Early life ==
Growing up in Maffra in country Victoria, Berry played for the Gippsland Power at junior level. He averaged 17.7 disposals, 9.8 contested possessions and 6.5 tackles in 10 games at the Gippsland Power.

== AFL career ==
Berry made his AFL debut in the opening round of the 2021 AFL season, when Adelaide defeated Geelong in an upset victory. He played 17 games in his debut season.

In 2022, Berry led the league for tackles collecting 171 for the year over 18 games for the Crows. He also had the highest average for tackles per game with an average of 9.5 a game. Berry struggled for form in 2023, but regained a spot in the team after kicking the match-winning goal against Carlton, coming on as the substitute for Adelaide's first win of 2024. Berry polled three Brownlow votes for the first time in his career for the round 23 win over the Western Bulldogs. At the end of the 2024 season, after delayed contract talks, Berry signed with Adelaide until the end of 2026.

In 2025, he started the season in the medical substitute role, often coming into games in the third or fourth quarters. He got his first start of the season in round 11 against West Coast, and he collected a career-best 26 disposals. He improved upon that record early in 2026, when he collected 29 disposals in the Gather Round win over Carlton.

Berry starred in the round 8, 2026 Showdown win against Port Adelaide, collecting 29 disposals and a career-best 19 tackles in the thrilling win against the cross-town rivals to earn his first Showdown Medal. His tally of 19 tackles stands as the second-most ever in a single game, one shy of the 20-tackle record set by teammate Rory Laird. Berry found career-best form in 2026, collecting his personal record of 29 disposals for the third time in the season, which included seven centre clearances in round 14 against the Western Bulldogs.

== Statistics ==
Updated to the end of round 22, 2026.

Legend
G	Goals	K	Kicks	D	Disposals	T	Tackles
B	Behinds	H	Handballs	M	Marks
†	Led the league for the season

Season	Team	No.	Games	Totals							Averages (per game)							Votes
Season	Team	No.	Games	G	B	K	H	D	M	T	G	B	K	H	D	M	T	Votes
2021	Adelaide	21	17	5	9	60	94	154	27	69	0.3	0.5	3.5	5.5	9.1	1.6	4.1	0
2022	Adelaide	21	18	3	2	156	161	317	33	171^{†}	0.2	0.1	8.7	8.9	17.6	1.8	9.5^{†}	2
2023	Adelaide	3	4	0	1	27	13	40	6	19	0.0	0.3	6.8	3.3	10.0	1.5	4.8	0
2024	Adelaide	3	18	4	2	123	125	248	26	91	0.2	0.1	6.8	6.9	13.8	1.4	5.1	3
2025	Adelaide	3	19	6	3	164	115	279	31	78	0.3	0.2	8.6	6.1	14.7	1.6	4.1	1
2026	Adelaide	3	20	2	8	232	228	460	54	150^{†}	0.1	0.4	11.6	11.4	23.0	2.7	7.5^{†}	0
Career			96	20	25	762	736	1498	177	578	0.2	0.3	7.9	7.7	15.6	1.8	6.0	6
