= 2013 AFL Rising Star =

Australian rules football award

2013 NAB AFL Rising Star
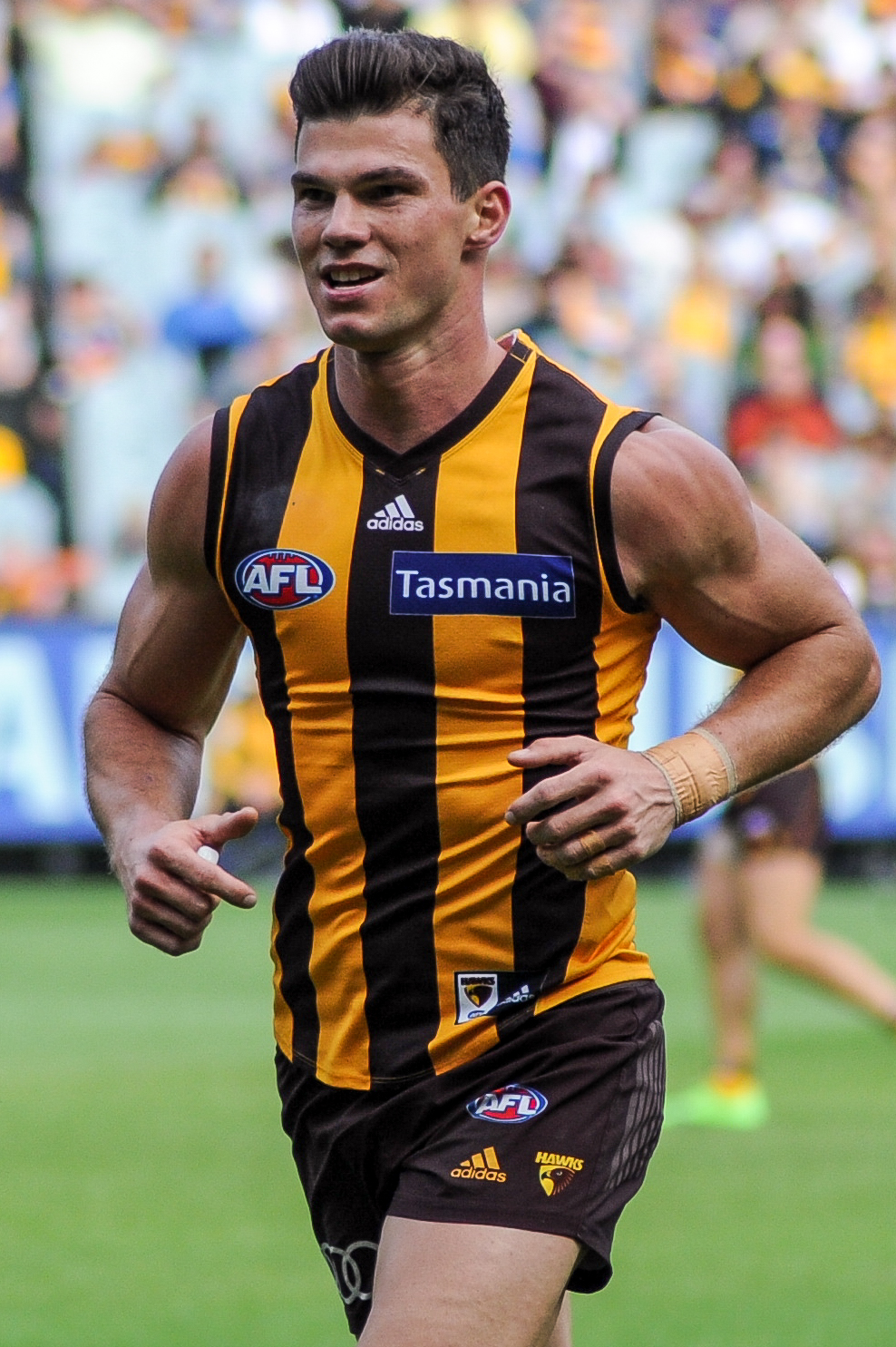
- Jaeger O'Meara, winner of the 2013 Rising Star, playing with Hawthorn in April 2017
- Sponsored by: National Australia Bank
- Date: 4 September
- Country: Australia
- Ron Evans medallist: Jaeger O'Meara (Gold Coast)

The NAB AFL Rising Star award is given annually to a stand out young player in the Australian Football League. The winner for 2013 was Jaeger O'Meara.

== Eligibility ==
Every round, an Australian Football League rising star nomination is given to a stand out young player. To be eligible for nomination, a player must be under 21 on 1 January of that year and have played 10 or fewer senior games before the start of the season; a player who is suspended may be nominated, but is not eligible to win the award. At the end of the year, one of the 23 nominees is the winner of award.

== Nominations ==
| Round | Player | Club | Ref. |
|---|---|---|---|
| 1 | Ollie Wines | Port Adelaide | |
| 2 | Aaron Mullett | North Melbourne | |
| 3 | Jed Anderson | Hawthorn | |
| 4 | George Horlin-Smith | Geelong | |
| 5 | Jaeger O'Meara | Gold Coast | |
| 6 | Bradley Hill | Hawthorn | |
| 7 | Nick Vlastuin | Richmond | |
| 8 | Jackson Macrae | Western Bulldogs | |
| 9 | Sam Kerridge | Adelaide | |
| 10 | Lachie Whitfield | Greater Western Sydney | |
| 11 | Tom Mitchell | Sydney | |
| 12 | Sam Mayes | Brisbane Lions | |
| 13 | Jake Neade | Port Adelaide | |
| 14 | Brad Crouch | Adelaide | |
| 15 | Michael Talia | Western Bulldogs | |
| 16 | Tom Nicholls | Gold Coast | |
| 17 | Adam Tomlinson | Greater Western Sydney | |
| 18 | Marley Williams | Collingwood | |
| 19 | Zac Williams | Greater Western Sydney | |
| 20 | Rory Laird | Adelaide | |
| 21 | Jack Viney | Melbourne | |
| 22 | Brodie Grundy | Collingwood | |
| 23 | Luke Brown | Adelaide | |

== Final voting ==
| | Player | Club | Votes |
|---|---|---|---|
| 1 | Jaeger O'Meara | Gold Coast | 44 |
| 2 | Brad Crouch | Adelaide | 31 |
| 3 | Ollie Wines | Port Adelaide | 26 |
| 4 | Tom Mitchell | Sydney | 11 |
| 4 | Aaron Mullett | North Melbourne | 11 |
| 6 | Nick Vlastuin | Richmond | 7 |
| 7 | Lachie Whitfield | Greater Western Sydney | 3 |
| 8 | Brodie Grundy | Collingwood | 1 |
| 8 | Sam Mayes | Brisbane Lions | 1 |
Source: AFL Record Season Guide 2015
