= Adam Tomlinson =

Australian rules footballer (born 1993)

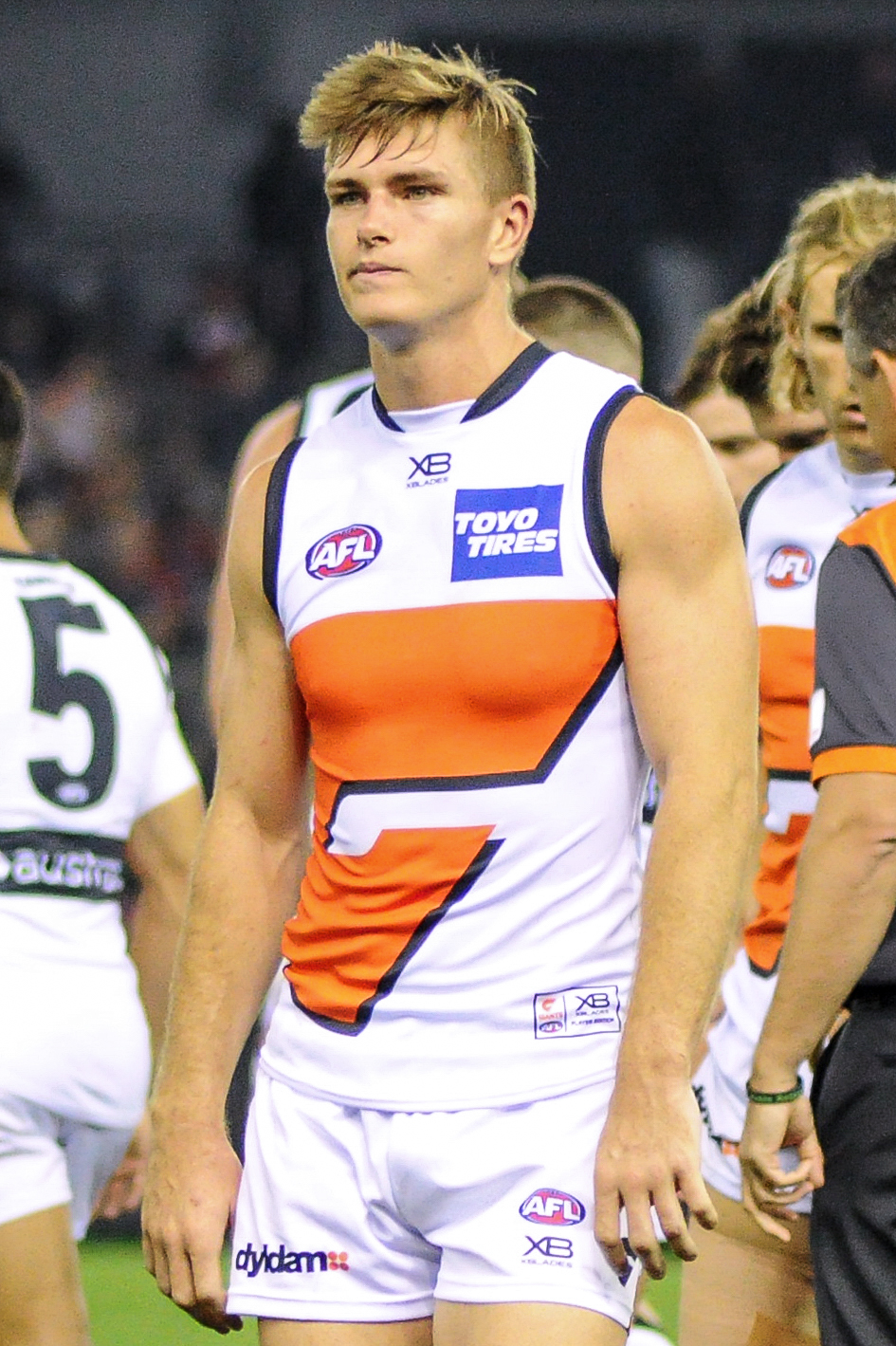
- Tomlinson playing for Greater Western Sydney in April 2018

Personal information
- Full name: Adam Tomlinson
- Born: 10 August 1993 (age 33)
- Original team: Oakleigh Chargers (TAC Cup)
- Draft: No. 9, 2011 national draft
- Height: 194 cm (6 ft 4 in)
- Weight: 96 kg (212 lb)
- Position: Key Defender

Playing career
Years	Club	Games (Goals)
2012–2019	Greater Western Sydney	140 (35)
2020–2024	Melbourne	45 (0)
Total		185 (35)

Career highlights
- Inaugural Greater Western Sydney team; 2013 AFL Rising Star nominee; VFL premiership player: 2022

Adam Tomlinson (born 10 August 1993) is a former professional Australian rules footballer who previously played for Greater Western Sydney and Melbourne in the Australian Football League (AFL).

== AFL career ==
=== Greater Western Sydney ===
Tomlinson was recruited by Greater Western Sydney with their seventh selection and ninth overall in the 2011 national draft. He made his debut in the sixty-three-point loss against Sydney at ANZ Stadium in Greater Western Sydney's inaugural match in round one.

In his second season, he was the round 17 nominee for the AFL Rising Star where he recorded twenty-three disposals, nine marks, four tackles and a goal in the thirty-nine-point loss against Essendon at Škoda Stadium. He was educated at Trinity Grammar School in Kew, Victoria.

Tomlinson had to wait until round 19, 2013, to experience his first win in an AFL match, when the Greater Western Sydney Giants defeated Melbourne by 37 points.

Tomlinson played in the Giants' 2019 Grand Final team, which lost to Richmond by 89 points. The Grand Final turned out to be his final match for the Giants, announcing he would be leaving as a free agent in the aftermath.

=== Melbourne ===
Tomlinson moved to Melbourne as a free agent ahead of the 2020 season.

Tomlinson played 45 games over 5 seasons at the Demons, before being delisted at the end of the 2024 season, the end of his initial 5 year contract.

== Personal life ==
Tomlinson currently studies a Bachelor of Property and Real Estate/Bachelor of Commerce at Deakin University.

Tomlinson grew up in the Melbourne suburb of Mont Albert. He played junior football for Canterbury Cobras and Camberwell Sharks in the Yarra Junior Football League.

== Statistics ==
Legend
G	Goals	K	Kicks	D	Disposals	T	Tackles
B	Behinds	H	Handballs	M	Marks

Season	Team	No.	Games	Totals							Averages (per game)							Votes
Season	Team	No.	Games	G	B	K	H	D	M	T	G	B	K	H	D	M	T	Votes
2012	Greater Western Sydney	20	9	2	1	56	43	99	31	16	0.2	0.1	6.2	4.8	11.0	3.4	1.8	0
2013	Greater Western Sydney	20	17	5	6	179	89	268	127	27	0.3	0.4	10.5	5.2	15.8	7.5	1.6	0
2014	Greater Western Sydney	20	19	8	6	181	126	307	127	47	0.4	0.3	9.5	6.6	16.2	6.7	2.5	0
2015	Greater Western Sydney	20	8	2	3	70	40	110	50	13	0.3	0.4	8.8	5.0	13.8	6.3	1.6	0
2016	Greater Western Sydney	20	14	1	3	110	70	180	66	21	0.1	0.2	7.9	5.0	12.9	4.7	1.5	0
2017	Greater Western Sydney	20	24	1	0	228	102	330	119	39	0.0	0.0	9.5	4.3	13.8	5.0	1.6	0
2018	Greater Western Sydney	20	24	12	4	255	144	399	129	63	0.5	0.2	10.6	6.0	16.6	5.4	2.6	0
2019	Greater Western Sydney	20	25	4	3	274	151	425	155	64	0.2	0.1	11.0	6.0	17.0	6.2	2.6	0
2020 (Note: The 2020 season was played with 17 home-and-away matches per team (down from 22) and 16-minute quarters with time on (down from 20-minute quarters with time on) due to the impact of the COVID-19 pandemic.)	Melbourne	20	13	0	1	106	56	162	56	22	0.0	0.1	8.2	4.3	12.5	4.3	1.7	0
2021 (Note: 2021 statistics include one game in which Tomlinson was substituted out of the game due to injury (round 7).)	Melbourne	20	7	0	0	61	23	84	38	9	0.0	0.0	8.7	3.3	12.0	5.4	1.3	0
2022 (Note: 2022 statistics include one game in which Tomlinson was an unused medical substitute (round 16).)	Melbourne	20	8	0	0	61	26	87	38	7	0.0	0.0	7.6	3.3	10.9	4.8	0.9	0
2023	Melbourne	20	9	0	1	91	30	121	39	15	0.0	0.1	10.1	3.3	13.4	4.3	1.7	0
2024	Melbourne	20	8	0	0	81	38	119	37	13	0.0	0.0	10.1	4.8	14.9	4.6	1.6	0
Career			185	35	28	1753	938	2691	1012	356	0.2	0.2	9.5	5.1	14.5	5.5	1.9	0
