= Zac Williams (Australian footballer) =

Australian rules footballer (born 1994)

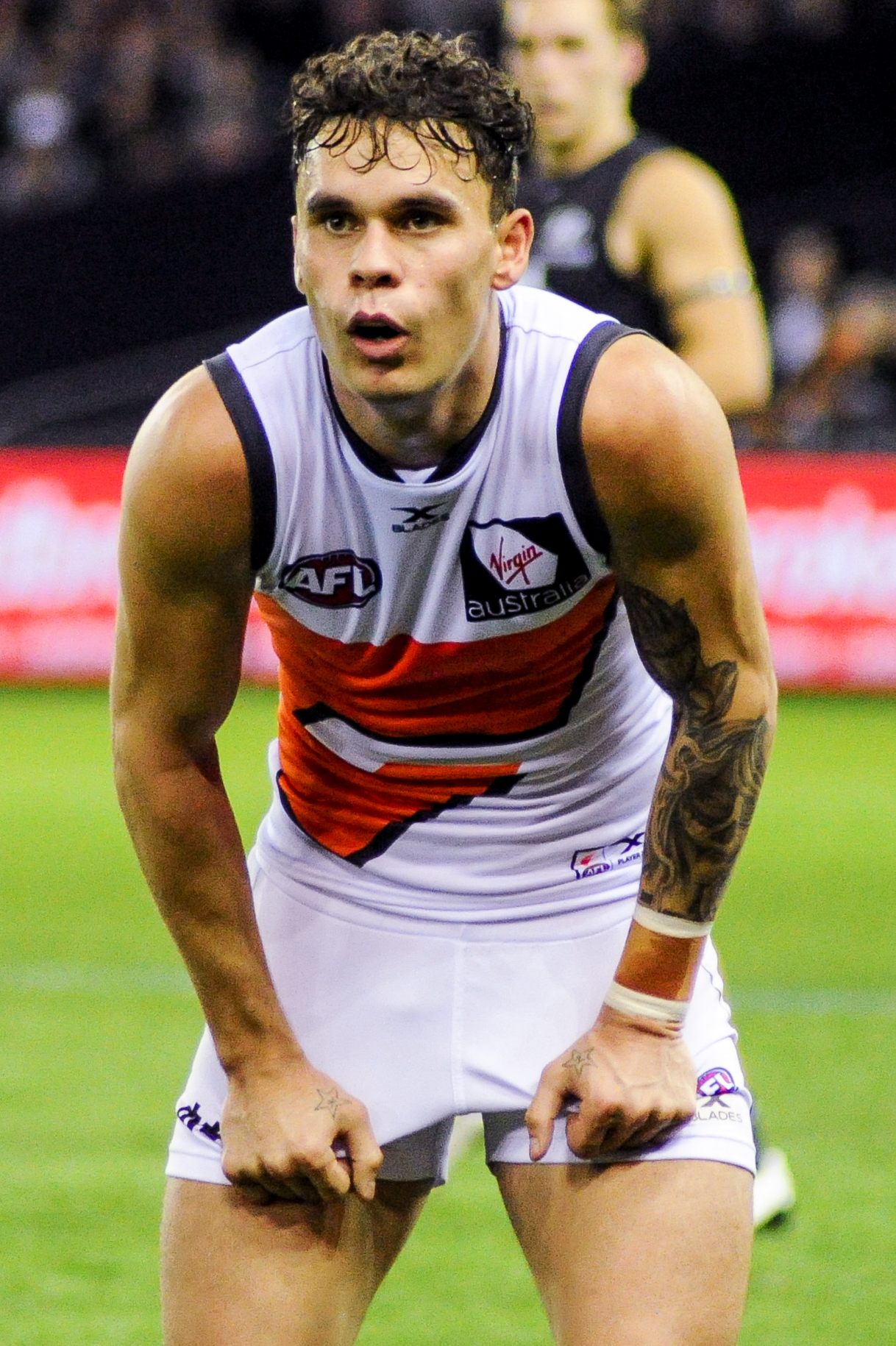
- Williams playing for Greater Western Sydney in June 2017

Personal information
- Full name: Zachary Williams
- Born: 20 September 1994 (age 32); Narrandera, New South Wales
- Original team: Narrandera (Riverina Football League)/GWS Giants Academy
- Draft: No. 54, 2013 rookie draft
- Debut: Round 5, 2013, Greater Western Sydney vs. Gold Coast, at Manuka Oval
- Height: 185 cm (6 ft 1 in)
- Weight: 86 kg (190 lb)
- Position: Defender / midfielder

Playing career^{1}
Years	Club	Games (Goals)
2013–2020	Greater Western Sydney	113 (27)
2021–2026	Carlton	70 (44)
Total		183 (71)

Representative team honours
Years	Team	Games (Goals)
2025	Indigenous All-Stars	1 (0)
- ^{1} Playing statistics correct to the end of the 2026 season.

Career highlights
- 2013 AFL Rising Star nominee; 22under22 team: 2016

Zachary Williams (born 20 September 1994) is a former professional Australian rules footballer who played for the GWS Giants Football Club and the Carlton Football Club in the Australian Football League (AFL). A utility, 1.85 metres tall and weighing 84 kilograms, Williams also played as a defender and midfielder. During Williams' time at the Greater Western Sydney Football Club, he played 113 games over eight seasons from 2013 to 2020. He was recruited by Greater Western Sydney as the 54th pick in the 2012 AFL Rookie Draft, making his debut in round five of the 2013 AFL season. Williams earned a nomination for the 2013 AFL Rising Star award and has played the 23rd most games for Greater Western Sydney Club. At the end of the 2020 season, Williams signed with Carlton as a restricted free agent.

== Early life and family ==
Williams was born and raised in Narrandera, New South Wales, to Steven Williams and Joy O'Hara. Williams is of Aboriginal Australian (Wiradjuri) descent on his father's side and of Irish descent on his mother's side. His father died when he was six years old, and his mother was left to raise him as well as his older sister Samantha. His Indigenous father's heritage remains a profound influence on Williams.

Williams attended Narrandera High School and grew up playing an array of sports, including basketball, rugby league, and AFL. Williams' father grew up playing rugby league, but chose to enrol Williams in Auskick as soon as he was old enough. His father believed he was more suited for the game. For financial reasons, William's mother asked him to pick just one sport at age 15. Williams chose AFL over basketball and rugby league, despite preferring basketball at the time, as he believed he was not tall enough to play professionally. His role models were fellow AFL players Adam Goodes and Michael O'Loughlin.

== Junior career ==
Growing up, Williams' main focus became Australian Rules Football. He played junior football for the Narrandera Eagles in the Riverina Football Netball League. At the age of 15, Williams joined Greater Western Sydney's academy program. The club's academy program allowed Williams to develop as a footballer and experience what professional football would be like. At age 17, Williams represented NSW in the AFL U18's Championship. Williams played in the 2012 Riverina Football League grand final, and was recognised as the best afield. Williams was unsuccessful in the 2012 National draft selection. Later, he was chosen by Greater Western Sydney Giants in the 2012 Rookie Draft as pick 55.

== AFL career ==
=== 2013 season ===
In April 2013, Williams was promoted from the rookie list to the senior list. He became the first academy graduate to join GWS's list. In round five of the 2013 AFL season, Williams made his debut at age 18, representing Greater Western Sydney Giants against the Gold Coast Suns at Manuka Oval. Williams went on to play 11 games that season, and earned the round 19 nomination for the 2013 AFL Rising Star award.

=== 2014 season ===
Prior to the start of the 2014 season, Williams changed from number 51 Guernsey to number 29, following the departure of Dom Tyson.

=== 2015 season ===
On 30 May 2015, the Greater Western Sydney Giants wore specially designed Indigenous themed guernseys in their game against the Western Bulldogs to commemorate the 2015 Indigenous Round. Williams was one of six Indigenous players on the team. In the second half of the 2015 season, Williams shifted positions and played as an attacking Backman.

=== 2016 season ===
Williams represented the 22 under 22 team in the 2016 season, playing as a back. He received the unofficial title of Most Underrated player in 2016, given by champion data. He was seventh in line for the best and fairest award for Greater Western Sydney Giants in 2016. Williams received his first two Brownlow Medal votes in round two against Gold Coast Suns. This game was Williams' best performance of the season with disposals (31), total kicks (20) and inside 50s (9). Williams had a career high season in 2016, averaging 22 possessions per game.

=== 2017 season ===
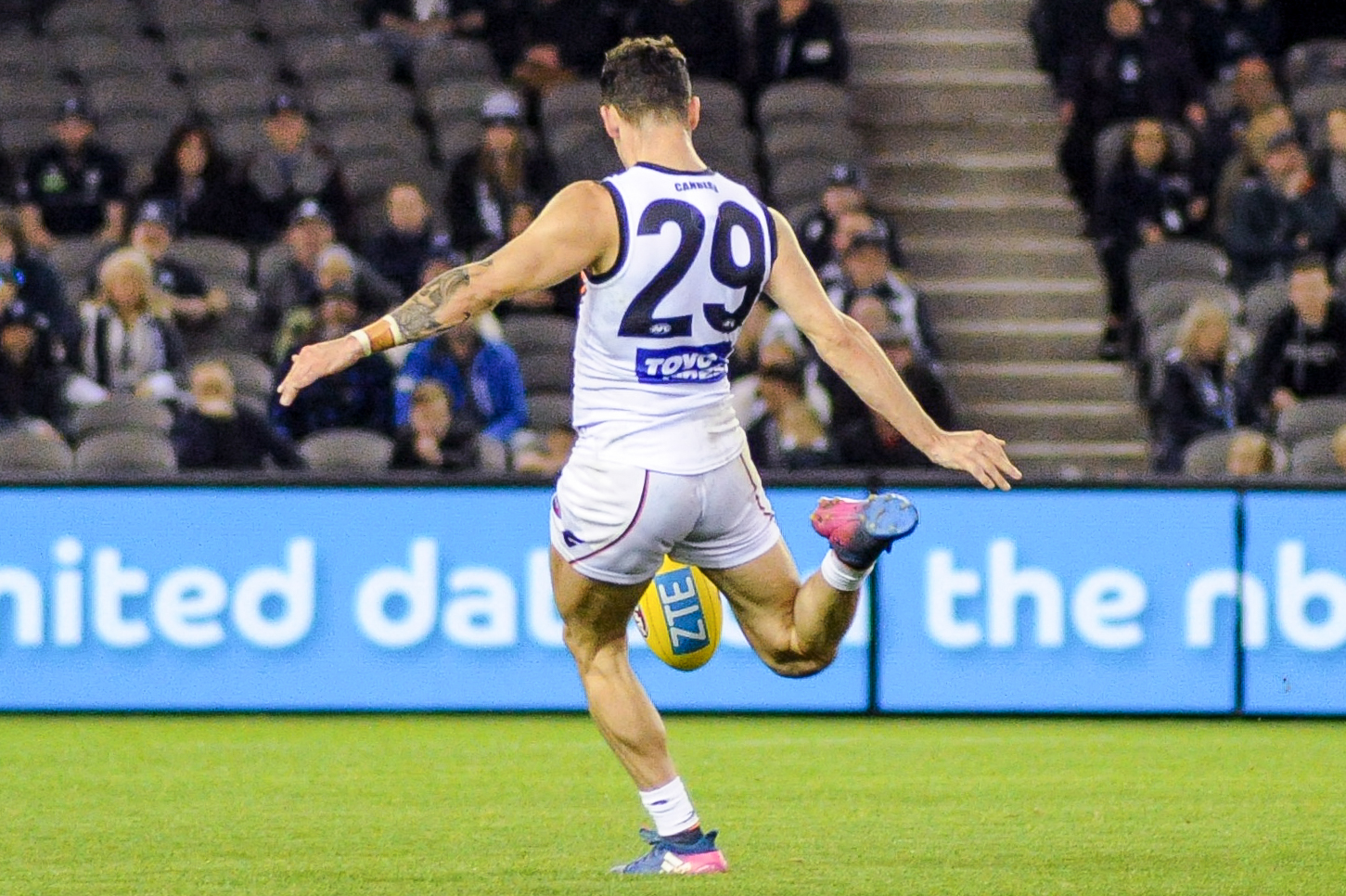
Williams playing for Greater Western Sydney on 11 June 2017 at Etihad Stadium in Melbourne, Victoria.

On 24 May 2017, it was announced that Williams would wear number 67 on his guernsey rather than his usual 29, for the round 10 Sir Doug Nicholls Indigenous Round game against West Coast. This was to commemorate the 1967 referendum (which allowed Indigenous Australians to be counted with the general population in the national census). Earlier in the year, Williams signed a contract extension with Greater Western Sydney Giants, and was to represent them until the contract finishes at the end of the 2020 season. Several Greater Western Sydney players suffered injuries in the 2017 season. A reshuffling of positions after injuries placed Williams in as a midfielder. He achieved 28 possessions and six clearances. Following injuries of Steve Johnson and Devon Smith, Williams then played as a forward and responded with three goals against Essendon in round 11. Towards the end of the season Williams resumed his usual position as a defender, and dominated in round 21 against Western Bulldogs with 27 disposals and 10 rebound 50s.

=== 2018 season ===
Williams was unable to play the majority of the 2018 season after rupturing his Achilles tendon in a training session, which required surgery. Williams returned to the season in the 2018 elimination-final against Sydney Swans, with disposables (23) and kicks (20).

=== 2019 season ===
Williams played 21 games in the 2019 season, only missing two due to a hamstring issue. His 100th game the 2019 season semi final against Brisbane Lions. He averaged a career high 24 disposals in the season and was fifth in line for the best and fairest award for Greater Western Sydney Giants. Williams played in Greater Western Sydney Club's first ever grand final against Richmond, with disposals (21), highballs (10) and uncontested possessions (13).

=== 2020 season ===
At the end of the 2020 season, Williams was at the end of a three-year contract with Greater Western Sydney Giants. Williams declined a multi-year extension contract from Greater Western Sydney club. After playing for eight seasons with Greater Western Sydney Club, Williams was classified a restricted free agent, which meant Greater Western Sydney club had the authority to match contract offers from rival clubs. On 30 September 2020, Williams accepted a six-year contract, valued at $900,000 a season from Carlton Football Club, after Greater Western Sydney Giants chose to not match the bid. Williams plans on playing as a midfielder in his career with Carlton, after showing great potential in the 2019 preliminary final against Collingwood.

=== 2021 season ===
On 20 January, Williams was given his new guernsey number at Carlton, the no.6, previously worn by Kade Simpson. Williams missed the Round 1 opener against Richmond after a bump in a preseason match landed him a one match ban for rough conduct.

== Retirement ==
Williams announced his retirement from the AFL on the 8th of November 2026, having played 183 games over 14 seasons at 2 clubs.

== Statistics ==
Updated to the end of the 2026 season.

Legend
G	Goals	K	Kicks	D	Disposals	T	Tackles
B	Behinds	H	Handballs	M	Marks

Season	Team	No.	Games	Totals							Averages (per game)							Votes
Season	Team	No.	Games	G	B	K	H	D	M	T	G	B	K	H	D	M	T	Votes
2013	Greater Western Sydney	51	11	2	1	71	78	149	28	33	0.2	0.1	6.5	7.1	13.5	2.5	3.0	0
2014	Greater Western Sydney	29	8	2	3	63	52	115	28	21	0.3	0.4	7.9	6.5	14.4	3.5	2.6	0
2015	Greater Western Sydney	29	12	5	3	104	83	187	51	31	0.4	0.3	8.7	6.9	15.6	4.3	2.6	0
2016	Greater Western Sydney	29	22	4	4	289	167	456	96	67	0.2	0.2	13.1	7.6	20.7	4.4	3.0	2
2017	Greater Western Sydney	29	23	7	8	302	208	510	75	88	0.3	0.3	13.1	9.0	22.2	3.3	3.8	6
2018	Greater Western Sydney	29	2	0	0	33	9	42	11	7	0.0	0.0	16.5	4.5	21.0	5.5	3.5	0
2019	Greater Western Sydney	29	24	5	3	416	152	568	123	75	0.2	0.1	17.3	6.3	23.7	5.1	3.1	5
2020 (Note: The 2020 season was played with 17 home-and-away matches per team (down from 22) and 16-minute quarters with time on (down from 20-minute quarters with time on) due to the impact of the COVID-19 pandemic.)	Greater Western Sydney	29	11	2	2	135	50	185	38	25	0.2	0.2	12.3	4.5	16.8	3.5	2.3	1
2021	Carlton	6	14	5	4	201	63	264	55	26	0.4	0.3	14.4	4.5	18.9	3.9	1.9	0
2022	Carlton	6	9	0	0	136	40	176	37	11	0.0	0.0	15.1	4.4	19.6	4.1	1.2	1
2023	Carlton	6	0	—	—	—	—	—	—	—	—	—	—	—	—	—	—	0
2024	Carlton	6	19	15	7	178	67	245	71	43	0.8	0.4	9.4	3.5	12.9	3.7	2.3	1
2025	Carlton	6	19	22	10	180	101	281	55	35	1.2	0.5	9.5	5.3	14.8	2.9	1.8	0
2026	Carlton	6	9	2	3	100	57	157	26	26	0.2	0.3	11.1	6.3	17.4	2.9	2.9	0
Career			183	71	48	2208	1127	3335	694	488	0.4	0.3	12.1	6.2	18.2	3.8	2.7	16

== Honours and achievements ==
Individual

- AFL Rising Star nominee: 2013
- Indigenous All-Stars team: 2013
- 22under22 team: 2016

== Personal life ==
Williams married partner Rachel Lucas on 4 January 2024. The couple have a daughter.
