= Aaron Mullett =

Australian rules football player

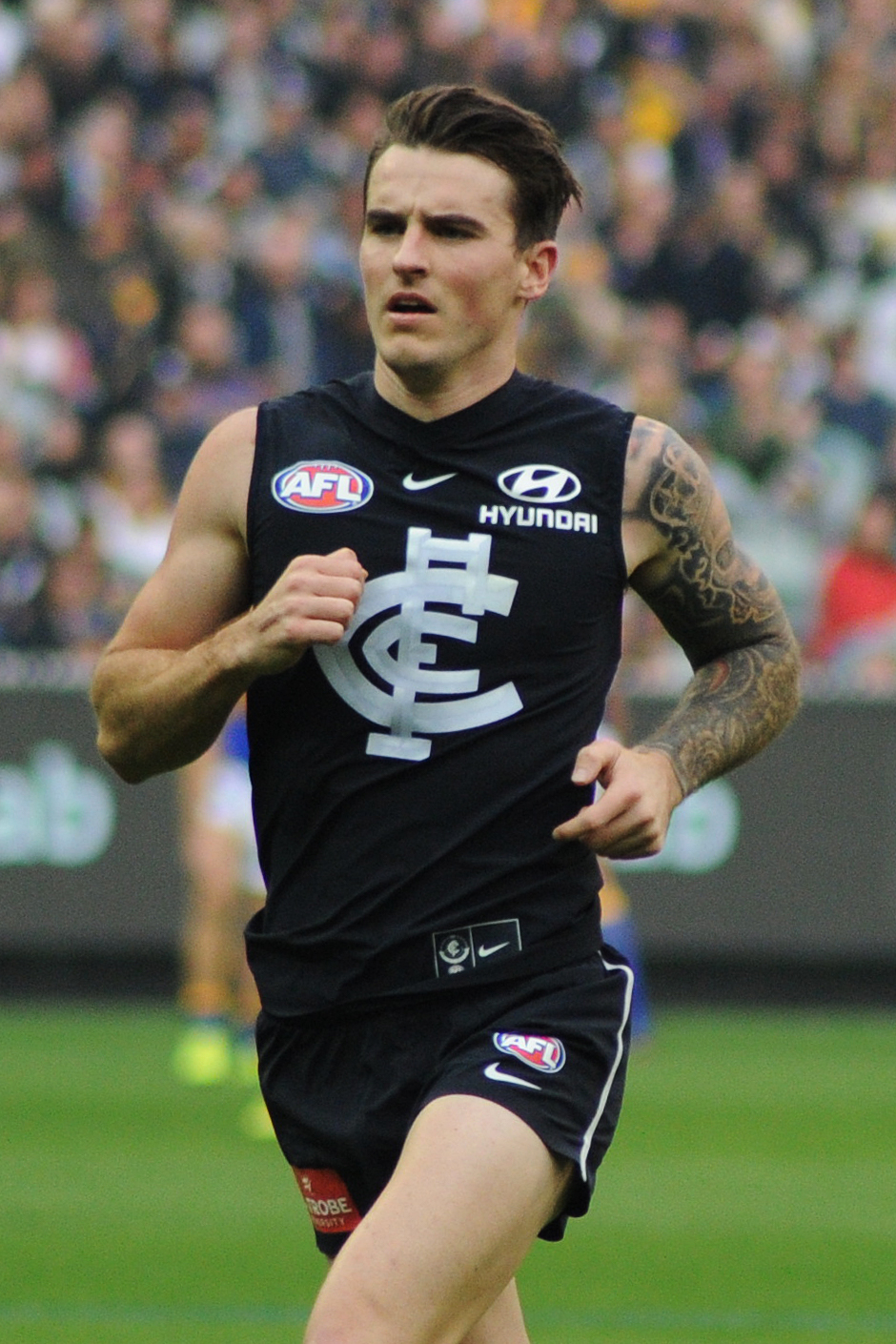
- Mullett playing for Carlton in April 2018

Personal information
- Full name: Aaron Mullett
- Born: 23 February 1992 (age 34)
- Original team: Eastern Ranges (TAC Cup)
- Draft: No. 34, 2011 rookie draft
- Height: 184 cm (6 ft 0 in)
- Weight: 82 kg (181 lb)
- Position: Midfielder

Club information
- Current club: Carlton
- Number: 18

Playing career^{1}
Years	Club	Games (Goals)
2011–2017	North Melbourne	85 (31)
2018	Carlton	13 (2)
Total		98 (33)
- ^{1} Playing statistics correct to the end of 2018.

Career highlights
- 22under22 team: 2013; AFL Rising Star nominee: 2013

Aaron Mullett (born 23 February 1992) is a former professional Australian rules footballer who played for the Carlton Football Club in the Australian Football League (AFL). He also played for the North Melbourne Football Club from 2011 to 2017.

He was the 34th selection in the 2011 AFL Rookie Draft.

Originally from Mooroolbark, in Melbourne's outer eastern suburbs, he showed potential as a junior playing for the Mooroolbark Mustangs in the Eastern Football League. He then moved clubs where his playing ability for Vermont Football Club saw him progress to the Eastern Ranges, where he played as a winger.

He was elevated to North Melbourne's senior list in August 2011, after playing well for North Ballarat in the Victorian Football League and was named to make his AFL debut in Round 22 of the 2011 AFL season against Fremantle.

Mullett made his debut against Fremantle in number 41 and impressed with 17 touches.

Mullet was the round 2 nomination for the 2013 AFL Rising Star after a 20 possession and a goal against Geelong.

He later pulled in a career-high 31 disposals in round 10 later that year against St.Kilda.

Mullett was selected in the AFL Players' Association's inaugural 22under22 team in 2013.

At the conclusion of the 2017 season, Mullett was delisted by North Melbourne. He subsequently signed with Carlton as a delisted free agent. He played thirteen games for Carlton during 2018, then was delisted at the end of the season.

As of 2023, Mullet plays locally in the Outer East Football Netball League For the Wandin Bulldogs.
