= Rory Laird =

Australian rules footballer (born 1993)

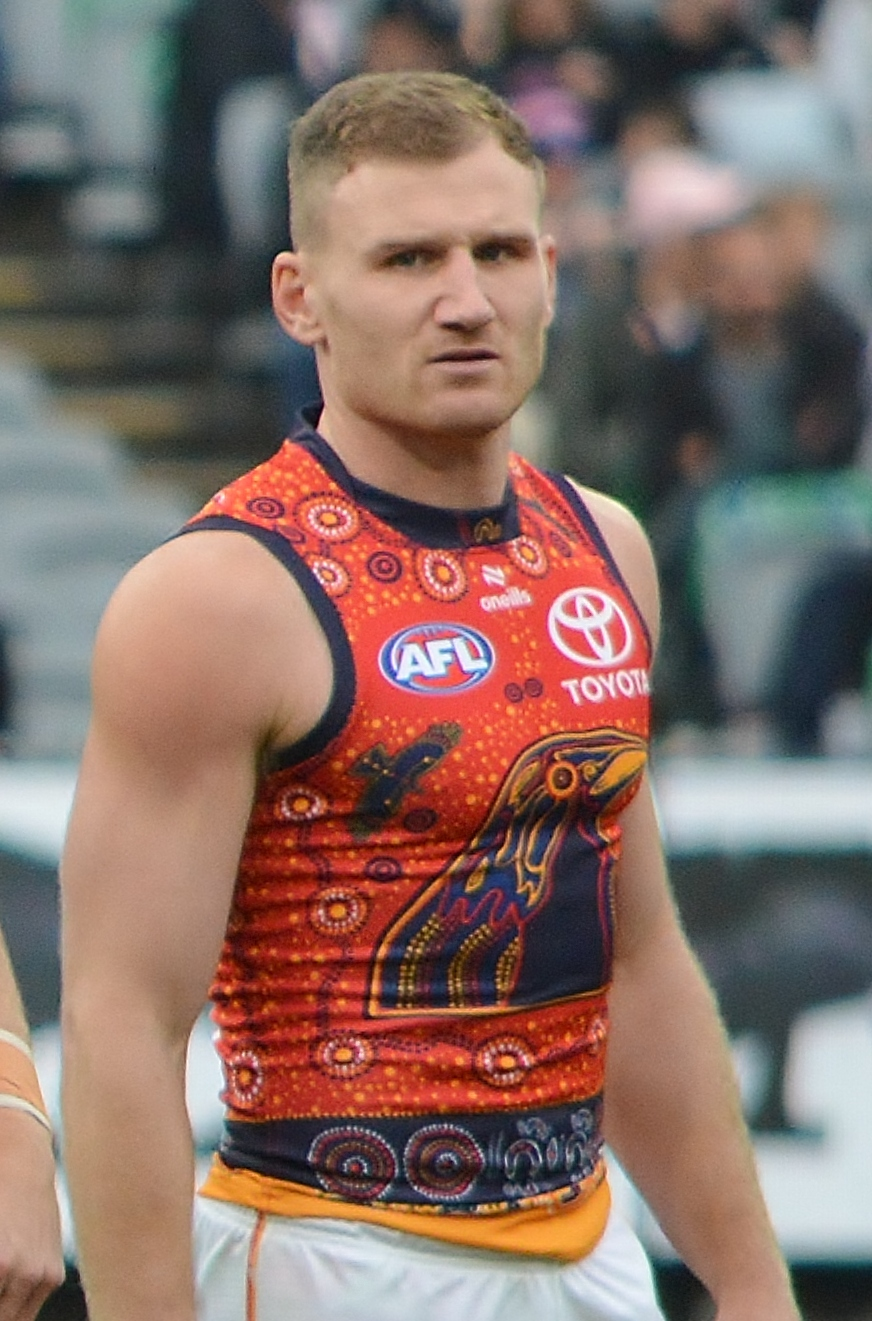
- Laird playing for Adelaide in May 2025

Personal information
- Full name: Rory Laird
- Nicknames: Desk, Stump
- Born: 29 December 1993 (age 32); South Australia
- Original teams: West Adelaide (SANFL); Kenilworth (SAAFL)
- Draft: No. 5, 2011 rookie draft
- Debut: Round 4, 2013, Adelaide vs. Western Bulldogs, at AAMI Stadium
- Height: 178 cm (5 ft 10 in)
- Weight: 78 kg (172 lb)
- Position: Defender

Club information
- Current club: Adelaide
- Number: 29

Playing career^{1}
Years	Club	Games (Goals)
2012–	Adelaide	285 (31)

Representative team honours
Years	Team	Games (Goals)
2020	All Stars	1 (0)

International team honours
2017	Australia	2 (0)
- ^{1} Playing statistics correct to the end of round 22, 2026.

Career highlights
- 2× All-Australian team: 2017, 2018; 3× Malcolm Blight Medal: 2018, 2021, 2022; 2× 22under22 team: 2015, 2016; 2013 AFL Rising Star nominee

Rory Laird (born 29 December 1993) is a professional Australian rules football player who plays for the Adelaide Football Club in the Australian Football League (AFL). He was drafted by Adelaide with pick 5 in the 2012 rookie draft.

== Early life ==
Laird grew up in the suburb of Eden Hills, South Australia. He attended Colonel Light Gardens Primary School and Scotch College, Adelaide in his teenage years, where he was coached by Brownlow Medalist Gavin Wanganeen and future Crows coach Matthew Nicks.

Laird played soccer until making the switch to Australian rules football at age 10. Only two years later, he was invited to join the West Adelaide Football Club's junior program.

Laird played club football for the Kenilworth Football Club in the South Australian Amateur Football League as well as playing for West Adelaide in the South Australian National Football League (SANFL) reserves. In the lead up to the AFL drafts in 2011, Laird was interviewed by Adelaide and trained with Essendon in Melbourne, Victoria. After missing out on the 2011 AFL national draft, he was drafted by the Adelaide Crows with pick 5 of the rookie draft a few weeks later.

== AFL career ==
=== Early career ===
In his first season in the AFL, Laird did not play for Adelaide. He played 18 consecutive games for West Adelaide in the SANFL, including three finals, but was dropped from the team that played in the 2012 SANFL Grand Final.

The Crows elevated Laird to the senior list as a replacement for the injured and out of form Sam Shaw in April 2013, and he made his AFL debut against the Western Bulldogs in round 4 of the season helping them to an easy victory He immediately became a regular in the side, missing only one further game in the season through injury, and averaging 18.5 disposals per game as a small defender. Laird received the Round 20 nomination for the 2013 AFL Rising Star award, following a 24-possession game against North Melbourne, and signed a two-year contract with the club in the same week. Laird played 16 games in 2014 despite injury issues, playing in defence and occasionally in the midfield. He was dropped to the SANFL late in the season but responded with a 42-possession game to earn a recall.

=== All-Australian years ===
Laird had a breakout year in 2015, playing every game and averaging 24.4 disposals in defence while blanketing his opponents, which earned him a place on the 40-man shortlist for the All-Australian team. During the year, he signed a three-year contract extension with the club. In 2016, he was named in the 40-man All-Australian squad but did not make the team. He improved even more on his form in 2017, starting the season with a 40-possession game against Greater Western Sydney. His form continued to stay at an elite level throughout the season, including a 34-possession game against St Kilda in Round 12. His consistency was rewarded with both an All-Australian selection and being nominated by his team for the AFL Players' Association MVP Award.

In 2018, Laird won the Malcolm Blight Medal as the Crows' best and fairest player. He was also selected in the All-Australian team for the second season in a row.

=== Midfield move ===
Following a move to the midfield in 2020 and a second-place finish in the Malcolm Blight medal, Laird signed a five-year contract extension with the Crows in March 2021. He continued his success in his new position, winning back-to-back Malcolm Blight Medals in 2021 and 2022. A highlight of his 2022 campaign came against Collingwood as he broke the AFL's record for tackles in a single game, collecting 20. Laird starred in his 200th game against West Coast in round 22 as he collected 36 disposals and kicked 2 goals in the victory.

Laird had another successful year in 2023 as he was again the runner-up in the Malcolm Blight Medal. In Gather Round against Carlton, Laird had 37 disposals, nine clearances and a goal, ultimately being awarded with three Brownlow votes for his performance. He finished the year with a career-best 20 Brownlow votes.

=== Late career ===
To begin the 2025 season, Laird returned to the backline. He starred with 32 disposals off of half-back in his 250th game against North Melbourne. During the same game, Laird also broke the record for the most disposals by a Crow, overtaking Scott Thompson's 6,752 disposals. Laird continued to find success in his defensive return, allowing young players such as Izak Rankine and Sam Berry to spend more game time in the midfield.

As of June 2026, Laird hold the record for the most AFL games played at Adelaide Oval with 144 appearances, and has the sixth most AFL appearances of any Crow with 279.

== Personal life ==
Growing up in the southern suburbs of Adelaide, South Australia, Laird shared a close bond with younger sister Mia. Laird's nephew and Mia's son Joel joined Laird as he ran out for his 250th AFL game in 2025.

Laird is currently engaged to fiancé Ellie. The couple announced their engagement in October 2024.

== Statistics ==
Updated to the end of round 22, 2026.

Legend
G	Goals	K	Kicks	D	Disposals	T	Tackles
B	Behinds	H	Handballs	M	Marks
†	Led the league for the season

Season	Team	No.	Games	Totals							Averages (per game)							Votes
Season	Team	No.	Games	G	B	K	H	D	M	T	G	B	K	H	D	M	T	Votes
2012	Adelaide	46	0	—	—	—	—	—	—	—	—	—	—	—	—	—	—	0
2013	Adelaide	46	18	1	2	180	153	333	74	51	0.1	0.1	10.0	8.5	18.5	4.1	2.8	0
2014	Adelaide	29	16	2	2	126	129	255	65	37	0.1	0.1	7.9	8.1	15.9	4.1	2.3	0
2015	Adelaide	29	23	2	4	289	273	562	133	58	0.1	0.2	12.6	11.9	24.4	5.8	2.5	2
2016	Adelaide	29	19	1	1	251	270	521	127	40	0.1	0.1	13.2	14.2	27.4	6.7	2.1	11
2017	Adelaide	29	25	3	1	367	369	736	143	55	0.1	0.0	14.7	14.8	29.4	5.7	2.2	9
2018	Adelaide	29	20	3	4	319	325	644	124	43	0.2	0.2	16.0	16.3	32.2	6.2	2.2	19
2019	Adelaide	29	22	0	1	322	301	623	125	47	0.0	0.0	14.6	13.7	28.3	5.7	2.1	2
2020 (Note: The 2020 season was played with 17 home-and-away matches per team (down from 22) and 16-minute quarters with time on (down from 20-minute quarters with time on) due to the impact of the COVID-19 pandemic.)	Adelaide	29	17	3	1	186	203	389	46	70	0.2	0.1	10.9	11.9	22.9	2.7	4.1	4
2021	Adelaide	29	22	3	8	314	390	704	82	130	0.1	0.4	14.3	17.7	32.0	3.7	5.9	16
2022	Adelaide	29	20	7	8	284	375	659	53	162	0.4	0.4	14.2	18.8^{†}	33.0	2.7	8.1	10
2023	Adelaide	29	22	3	10	262	375	637	67	175	0.1	0.5	11.9	17.0	29.0	3.0	8.0	20
2024	Adelaide	29	23	2	5	271	364	635	83	132	0.1	0.2	11.8	15.8	27.6	3.6	5.7	7
2025	Adelaide	29	22	1	0	286	245	531	131	78	0.0	0.0	13.0	11.1	24.1	6.0	3.5	5
2026	Adelaide	29	16	0	0	216	162	378	108	41	0.0	0.0	13.5	10.1	23.6	6.8	2.6	0
Career			285	31	47	3673	3934	7607	1361	1119	0.1	0.2	12.9	13.8	26.7	4.8	3.9	105
